= Prizefighter series =

Boxing competitions

The Prizefighter series was a professional boxing tournament created by boxing promoter Barry Hearn and aired on Sky Sports. The format has an initial eight fighters, who compete in four quarter-finals of 3 x 3 minute rounds (number and length of the rounds is same as in amateur boxing) followed by two semi-finals and one final all on the same night. The total prize money of the tournament is £80,000 with the winner of the tournament taking home £32,000, a figure that has increased from the initial top prize of £25,000 when the tournament first aired in April 2008. There have been 34 Prizefighter tournaments so far featuring 14 different weight divisions. The last tournament was held in 2015.

In 2024 a new Prizefighter tournament was announced. This time promoted by Eddie Hearn, the tournament would include eight fighters in the middleweight division. Unlike in the previous tournaments, this time the fights would be 10-rounders and the tournament isn't completed in a single evening. The quarter-finals were held on July 15, 2024 in Osaka, Japan.

== Prizefighter 1: The Heavyweights ==
The first Prizefighter took place at York Hall, Bethnal Green in April 2008. The event was televised live on Sky Sports and saw 8 heavyweight fighters compete for the title. Competitors for the first series were Martin Rogan, David Dolan, Dave Ferguson, Billy Bessey, Alex Ibbs, Darren Morgan, Paul Butlin and Colin Kenna.

Martin Rogan and David Dolan met in the final each boasting unbeaten records of 9–0. Rogan won after three rounds of boxing in which Dolan had been knocked down twice. Dolan was possibly still feeling the effects of a gruelling first round fight in which a punishing left hook from Darren Morgan had him out on his feet and holding on.

Quarter-finals
Dave Ferguson	U-PTS
Billy Bessey
Martin Rogan	TKO 2
Alex Ibbs
Paul Butlin	TKO 2
Colin Kenna
David Dolan	U-PTS
Darren Morgan

Semi-finals
Dave Ferguson
Martin Rogan	U-PTS
Paul Butlin
David Dolan	U-PTS

Final
Martin Rogan	U-PTS
David Dolan

== Prizefighter 2: The Heavyweights II ==
The second tournament was held at the Telewest Arena in Newcastle in September 2008, and involved Sam Sexton, Pele Reid, Luke Simpkin, Dave Ferguson, Chris Burton, David Ingleby, Lee Swaby and Darren Morgan. The draw for the first round of fights was made by reigning British champion Danny Williams. Speaking before the tournament, competitor Luke Simpkin said "This could change my life if I win it", initially a substitute he was brought in to replace Ian Millarvie who had sustained an injury. Of his tactics for the tournament Simpkin said "There’s no tactics involved in my game and attack is the best form of defence so I will just attack. You haven’t got much time to plan anything so I will just go out there, have a good time and try my best".

"At 24-years-old I still haven't got my man strength as yet, and I know I can keep improving, hopefully next year I can get a shot at British title, I will keep getting stronger and stronger."

— Sam Sexton, winner of the 2nd Prizefighter tournament

On the night it was the Norwich heavyweight Sam Sexton who came out on top with wins over Pelé Reid in the quarter-final, Luke Simpkin in the semi-finals and the hometown favourite Chris Burton in the final. After the win Sexton praised his tactics saying "The night went exactly how we planned it, we had a gameplan for each fight worked out before we came tonight". On his future aspirations he added "At 24-years-old I still haven't got my man strength as yet, and I know I can keep improving, hopefully next year I can get a shot at British title, I will keep getting stronger and stronger."

Quarter-finals
Sam Sexton	U-PTS
Pele Reid
Luke Simpkin	S-PTS
Dave Ferguson
Chris Burton	U-PTS
David Ingleby
Lee Swaby	U-PTS
Darren Morgan

Semi-finals
Sam Sexton	U-PTS
Luke Simpkin
Chris Burton	U-PTS
Lee Swaby

Final
Sam Sexton	TKO 3
Chris Burton

== Prizefighter 3: The Welterweights ==
Prizefighter 3 took place on 24 October 2008 back at the York Hall and featured a different weight class to the previous two events with welterweights competing for the main prize. Fighters taking part in the competition were former European champion Ted Bami; English champions Nigel Wright and Ross Minter; Former ABA champion Michael Lomax; Commonwealth challenger Craig Dickson; Midlands Area champion Mark Lloyd; Former IBO light middleweight champion Steven Conway, and Andrew Ferrans.

"Hopefully this will be the break my career needs and as I said afterwards this wasn't about the money I won, but the glory I have enjoyed from this competition"

— Michael Lomax, winner of the 3rd Prizefighter tournament

Michael Lomax won the tournament with wins over Craig Dickson, Nigel Wright and Ted Bami in the final. Lomax had been confident before the tournament had even begun despite not being the favourite to lift the trophy saying "I am confident I'll win...no one is as dedicated as me, what you put in is what you get out". He claimed that it was the best night of his career so far and raised hopes that this was the launchpad for his career saying "Hopefully this will be the break my career needs and as I said afterwards this wasn't about the money I won, but the glory I have enjoyed from this competition." The result wasn't without controversy however as many people watching at ringside as well as the commentators on Sky thought that Lomax had actually lost his semi-final against Nigel Wright. The judges however thought differently and scored a split decision win for the eventual champion. A shocked Wright speaking after the bout said "I'm absolutely disgusted – how could they rob me like that...One judge gave Lomax all three which is unbelievable...I can't remember Michael hitting me with a clean shot."

Quarter-finals
Ted Bami	TKO 1
Andrew Ferrans
Mark Lloyd	U-PTS
Steven Conway
Michael Lomax	U-PTS
Craig Dickson
Nigel Wright	U-PTS
Ross Minter

Semi-finals
Ted Bami	U-PTS
Mark Lloyd
Michael Lomax	U-PTS
Nigel Wright

Final
Ted Bami
Michael Lomax	U-PTS

== Prizefighter 4: The Middleweights ==
Prizefighter 4 took place again at the York Hall this time on 21 November 2008. The tournament featured Middleweights Paul Samuels, Danny Butler, Max Maxwell, Steve Ede, Cello Renda, Danny Thornton, Joe Rea and Martin Murray. It also formed part of a Sky Box Office show featuring the Ricky Hatton fight with Paulie Malignaggi as the main event.

Martin Murray won the tournament and the £25,000 prize money following wins over Joe Rea, Danny Butler and then in the final Cello Renda. The final itself saw Renda getting knocked down and with both fighters coming out swinging and fighting toe to toe.

Quarter-finals
Max Maxwell	S-PTS
Steve Ede
Cello Renda	TKO 2
Danny Thornton
Danny Butler	U-PTS
Paul Samuels
Martin Murray	U-PTS
Joe Rea

Semi-finals
Max Maxwell
Cello Renda	U-PTS
Danny Butler
Martin Murray	S-PTS

Final
Cello Renda
Martin Murray	S-PTS

== Prizefighter 5: The Light Heavyweights ==
The fifth instalment of the Prizefighter franchise took place on 20 February 2009 with the weight division on this occasion being light heavyweight. Boxers taking part in the competition were Courtney Fry, Shon Davies, Tony Oakey, Billy Boyle, Bob Ajisafe, Carl Dilks, Darren Stubbs and Steve Spartacus. Former British champion Tony Oakey eventually won the tournament having defeated Billy Boyle and Courtney Fry on the way to a final win over Stubbs.

Quarter-finals
Courtney Fry	U-PTS
Shon Davies
Tony Oakey	U-PTS
Billy Boyle
Bob Ajisafe
Carl Dilks	U-PTS
Darren Stubbs	TKO
Steve Spartacus

Semi-finals
Courtney Fry
Tony Oakey	U-PTS
Carl Dilks
Darren Stubbs	S-PTS

Final
Tony Oakey	U-PTS
Darren Stubbs

== Prizefighter 6: The Lightweights ==
The sixth installment of the Prizefighter franchise took place on 24 March 2009 at the Kelvin Hall, Scotland with the weight division on this occasion being lightweight. Boxers taking part in the competition were Ryan Brawley, Ben Murphy, Paul Holborn, Charlie King, Gary McArthur, Steve Saville, Stephen Burke and Stuart Green. Brawley won the tournament with victories over Murphy, Holborn and Burke in the final.

Quarter-finals
Ryan Brawley	U-PTS
Ben Murphy
Charlie King
Paul Holborn	U-PTS
Gary McArthur	U-PTS
Steve Saville
Stephen Burke	U-PTS
Stuart Green

Semi-finals
Ryan Brawley	S-PTS
Paul Holborn
Gary McArthur
Stephen Burke	TKO

Final
Ryan Brawley	U-PTS
Stephen Burke

== Prizefighter 7: The Cruiserweights ==
The seventh instalment of the Prizefighter franchise took place on 19 May 2009 at Earls Court Exhibition Centre, London with the weight division on this occasion being cruiserweight. Boxers taking part in the competition were Darren Corbett, Terry Dunstan, Dean Francis, John Keeton, Ovill McKenzie, Bruce Scott, Neil Simpson and Mickey Steeds. Mark Krence was originally drafted in, but replaced by McKenzie after he was forced to withdraw due to injury. McKenize went on to win the title scoring wins over Dunstan, Corbett and Keeton in the final.

Quarter-finals
Dean Francis	TKO
Neil Simpson
John Keeton	U-PTS
Bruce Scott
Terry Dunstan
Ovill McKenzie	U-PTS
Mickey Steeds
Darren Corbett	U-PTS

Semi-finals
Dean Francis
John Keeton	TKO
Ovill McKenzie	TKO
Darren Corbett

Final
John Keeton
Ovill McKenzie	U-PTS

== Prizefighter 8: The Heavyweights III ==
The eighth tournament was held on 2 October 2009, it was originally due to be held at the York Hall in Bethnal Green, but was moved to the larger ExCeL London due to demand for tickets, increasing the potential attendance by 5,000. The boxers involved initially were Danny Williams, Audley Harrison, Michael Sprott, Scott Gammer, Scott Belshaw, Michael Holden, Coleman Barrett and Danny Hughes.

Carl Baker was eventually drafted in to take the place of Michael Holden after the BBBofC refused permission for Holden to fight after voicing concerns over his lack of activity over recent years in the ring. Sprott withdrew following a family bereavement and was replaced by Neil Perkins.

The quarter final draw took place on 11 September at the Mandalay Bay Resort and Casino in Las Vegas, Nevada by Mike Tyson alongside Matchroom Sports chairman Barry Hearn.

Former Olympic gold medalist Audley Harrison eventually won the title having defeated Scott Belshaw, Danny Hughes and Coleman Barrett. Reigning British heavyweight champion Danny Williams, lost in the first round to substitute boxer Carl Baker, with Baker knocking him down four times over the course of the three round contest. The defeat to Baker also meant that Williams would be stripped of his British title.

Quarter-finals
Scott Gammer
Coleman Barrett	U-PTS
Danny Williams
Carl Baker	U-PTS
Audley Harrison	KO
Scott Belshaw
Neil Perkins
Danny Hughes	KO

Semi-finals
Coleman Barrett	U-PTS
Carl Baker
Audley Harrison	U-PTS
Danny Hughes

Final
Coleman Barrett
Audley Harrison	RSF

== Prizefighter 9: The Light Welterweights ==
On 4 December 2009, the tournament saw the light welterweight's competing for the first time. Amongst the contestants was Gavin Rees, the first former World champion to compete in the tournament's history. The competition also had a number of European champions competing with Colin Lynes, Jason Cook and Ted Bami, a man who had also reached the final of the Welterweight prizefighter tournament in October 2008. Former British champions David Barnes and Young Mutley also took part as did unbeaten fighter Michael Grant and Welshman Barrie Jones. The draw for the competition was conducted by Floyd Mayweather Jr.

Gavin Rees, who was supported at ringside by Joe Calzaghe, eventually picked up the trophy and £32,000 prize money after defeating all three former European champions in Ted Bami, Jason Cook and Colin Lynes in the final.

Quarter-finals
Michael Grant
Jason Cook	TKO
Ted Bami
Gavin Rees	U-PTS
Colin Lynes	SD
David Barnes
Barrie Jones
Young Mutley	U-PTS

Semi-finals
Jason Cook
Gavin Rees	U-PTS
Colin Lynes	SD
Young Mutley

Final
Gavin Rees	U-PTS
Colin Lynes

== Prizefighter 10: The Light Middleweights ==
On 26 February 2010, Prizefighter returned to the York Hall and featured the first outing for the light middleweight division. Among the contestants were former British champion Neil Sinclair and former Commonwealth champion Bradley Pryce. The tournament also featured former middleweight semi finalist Danny Butler, Midlands Area champion Martin Concepcion, unbeaten boxers Steve O'Meara and Brett Flournoy as well as George Hillyard and Prince Arron.

In a tournament that proved difficult to predict, Droylsden boxer Prince Arron scored an upset win after beating Hillyard in the quarter-final, Pryce in the semis and then knocking down the unbeaten former ABA champion Flournoy in the final.

Quarter-finals
George Hillyard
Prince Arron	U-PTS
Neil Sinclair
Bradley Pryce	SD
Brett Flournoy	U-PTS
Danny Butler
Martin Concepcion
Steve O'Meara	U-PTS

Semi-finals
Prince Arron	U-PTS
Bradley Pryce
Brett Flournoy	SD
Steve O'Meara

Final
Prince Arron	U-PTS
Brett Flournoy

== Prizefighter 11: The Cruiserweights II ==
On 30 April 2010, Prizefighter was at the York Hall once again and featured the second outing for the cruiserweight division. The main contender was two-time WBO world heavyweight champion Herbie Hide. Also in contention were former Commonwealth champion Darren Corbett and unbeaten prospect Jon-Lewis Dickinson. The tournament also featured former English heavyweight champion Mark Krence as well as novices Leon Williams, Zahid Kahut, John Anthony and Wayne Brooks.

Hide comfortably won his quarter-final against Brooks but suffered a cut after a clash of heads in the bout. He was forced to withdraw and was replaced by reserve Nick Okoth, a firefighter, who had been at work earlier in the day. He won a coin toss against Preston's Paul Morris to replace Hide. Journeyman Okoth, who had a record of 8-27-5 going into the tournament, pulled off the biggest win of his career with a UD victory against Corbett and faced Dickinson in the final who had knocked out Krence in his semi final bout. Dickinson dominated the final and knocked out Okoth in the final round to take the trophy and £32,000 cash prize.

Quarter-finals
Mark Krence	U-PTS
Zahid Kahut
Leon Williams
Jon-Lewis Dickinson	SD
John Anthony
Darren Corbett	U-PTS
Wayne Brooks
Herbie Hide	U-PTS

Semi-finals
Mark Krence
Jon-Lewis Dickinson	RTD
Darren Corbett
Nick Okoth	U-PTS

Final
Jon-Lewis Dickinson	KO
Nick Okoth

== Prizefighter 12: The Super Bantamweights ==
On 29 May 2010, Prizefighter was at the York Hall once again and featured the first outing for the super-bantamweight division. The original line-up included former WBC world bantamweight champion Wayne McCullough, former British, Commonwealth and European champion Esham Pickering, former English champion Mark Moran and unbeaten prospects Craig Lyon and Ricky Owen. Josh Wale, Chris Riley and Gavin Reid completed the line up. McCullough, Lyon and Riley withdrew in the weeks leading up to the tournament and were replaced by 2002 Commonwealth Games gold medallist Jamie Arthur, undefeated Irishman Willie Casey, and Robbie Turley.

The opening bout between Moran and Casey was the only one to finish inside the distance. The remaining quarter-finals were all decided on split decisions with Pickering being the main casualty, being defeated by Josh Wale. In the semi-finals, Casey defeated Wale in a thrilling contest in which 532 punches were thrown in just three rounds. Owen maintained his unbeaten record with a victory over Jamie Arthur, however he was unable to progress to the final after injuries sustained in the fight. He was forced to withdraw and was replaced by young Paul McElhinney, a Scotsman who was undefeated in four fights and won a coin toss against Slough's Ian Bailey to replace Owen. Despite having already fought two bouts Casey was able to win the final by unanimous decision.

Quarter-finals
Mark Moran
Willie Casey	TKO
Esham Pickering
Josh Wale	SD
Robbie Turley
Jamie Arthur	SD
Gavin Reid
Ricky Owen	SD

Semi-finals
Willie Casey	SD
Josh Wale
Jamie Arthur
Ricky Owen	U-PTS

Final
Willie Casey	U-PTS
Paul McElhinney

== Prizefighter 13: The Super Middleweights ==
On 30 June 2010, the first ever super middleweights Prizefighter took place in York Hall, London. The original line up featured former British champions Tony Dodson and Tony Quigley, former English champion Paul David, former BBofC Celtic champion Stevie McGuire, former British Masters champion Eddie McIntosh, as well as Daniel Cadman and Peter Fedorenko. For the first time, it was decided that the eighth competitor would be decided by an online public vote. The winner of the vote was former BBofC Southern Area champion Tony Salam. In the buildup to the event, Dodson, McGuire, Quigley and Salam all withdrew, and were replaced by Gambia-born Patrick Mendy, who at 19 years old was the youngest ever Prizefighter contender, former Midlands Area champion Sam Horton, former Western Area champion Carl Drake, and unbeaten Welshman Jeff Evans.

Mendy was the eventual winner of the tournament, breaking the record for fastest Prizefighter knockout when he defeated Sam Horton after 82 seconds, and then became the youngest Prizefighter winner as well as competitor when he defeated Paul David in the final.

Quarter-finals
Sam Horton
Patrick Mendy	TKO
Daniel Cadman	U-PTS
Eddie McIntosh
Jeff Evans	SD
Peter Fedorenko
Carl Drake
Paul David	KO

Semi-finals
Patrick Mendy	U-PTS
Daniel Cadman
Jeff Evans
Paul David	U-PTS

Final
Patrick Mendy	U-PTS
Paul David

== Prizefighter 14: The Heavyweights IV ==
On 9 October 2010, the York Hall played host to the fourth outing for the heavyweights as part of the Prizefighter series. Contestants taking part included the former British, European and Commonwealth champion Matt Skelton and the former British and Commonwealth champion Michael Sprott. Other boxers taking part included Kevin McBride, the last man to beat Mike Tyson, Franklin Egobi, Ali Adams, Shane McPhilbin, Declan Timlin and Danny Hughes. The tournament was won by Sprott who beat Danny Hughes in the quarter-finals, Shane McPhilbin in the semis and Matt Skelton in the final. The fight against Skelton in particular was notable for Sprott in that it was the third time the two had met in the ring with Skelton having won the previous two fights. Sprott himself was also coming into the tournament on the back of a defeat in a European title challenge to Audley Harrison, the winner of the previous Prizefighter tournament featuring heavyweights.

Quarter-finals
Ali Adams
Matt Skelton	U-PTS
Kevin McBride	U-PTS
Franklin Egobi
Shane McPhilbin	RSF
Declan Timlin
Danny Hughes
Michael Sprott	U-PTS

Semi-finals
Matt Skelton	U-PTS
Kevin McBride
Shane McPhilbin
Michael Sprott	U-PTS

Final
Matt Skelton
Michael Sprott	U-PTS

== Prizefighter 15: The Super Featherweights ==
On 21 November 2010, again at the York Hall, the 15th installment of the Prizefighter competition showcased boxers from the super featherweight division for the first time. Contestants taking part included the reigning British champion Gary Sykes and a former British and European title challenger in Gary Buckland. Ben Murphy and Gary McArthur had both previously contested the lightweight installment of the Prizefighter tournament on 24 March 2009. Choi Tseveenpurev, the WBU title holder, Derry Mathews, the former WBU title holder, Stevie Bell and Scott Lawton made up the rest of the competitors.

The competition resulted in a win for Gary Buckland who met Derry Mathews in the final and scored a second-round KO over the Liverpool man. Buckland had fought his way to the final beating the likes of Stevie Bell in the quarters and Gary Sykes in the semis. The win over Sykes in particular was notable in that the reigning British champion had chosen to compete in the tournament only to suffer a shock first-round knockout.

Quarter-finals
Stevie Bell
Gary Buckland	U-PTS
Gary Sykes	U-PTS
Scott Lawton
Choi Tseveenpurev	U-PTS
Ben Murphy
Gary McArthur
Derry Mathews	KO

Semi-finals
Gary Buckland	KO
Gary Sykes
Choi Tseveenpurev
Derry Mathews	U-PTS

Final
Gary Buckland	KO
Derry Mathews

== Prizefighter 16: The Light Heavyweights II ==
On 29 January 2011, at the Olympia, London, the 16th installment of the Prizefighter competition showcased boxers from the light heavyweight division for the second time. Former British champion Tony Dodson was the biggest name involved.

The winner of the tournament was Travis Dickinson, whose brother Jon-Lewis Dickinson won Prizefighter at cruiserweight in April 2010. Dickinson beat Llewellyn Davies, Justin Jones and Sam Couzens to win the title - Jones and Couzens stepping in as reserves after the withdrawals of Dodson and Jack Morris due to injury.

Quarter-finals
Billy Slate
Jack Morris	SD
Travis Dickinson	U-PTS
Llewellyn Davies
Tony Dodson	U-PTS
Michael Banbula
Joe Smyth
Menay Edwards	TKO

Semi-finals
Justin Jones
Travis Dickinson	U-PTS
Tony Dodson	KO
Menay Edwards

Final
Travis Dickinson	KO
Tony Dodson

== Prizefighter 17: The Super Middleweights II ==
The second version of the super middleweight tournament took place in Liverpool on 23 March 2011 and saw a hometown winner in Rocky Fielding. Fielding became the first man to win the tournament by scoring three stoppages in a row beating the likes of Patrick J Maxwell (stoppage in the 2nd), Joe Ainscough (stoppage in the 1st) and Tobias Webb (stoppage in the 1st).

Quarter-finals
Patrick J Maxwell
Rocky Fielding	TKO 2
Joe Ainscough	SD
Wayne Reed
Tobias Webb	U-PTS
Robin Reid
Carl Dilks
Jahmaine Smyle	SD

Semi-finals
Rocky Fielding	TKO 1
Joe Ainscough
Tobias Webb	U-PTS
Jahmaine Smyle

Final
Rocky Fielding	RTD 1
Tobias Webb

== Prizefighter 18: The International Heavyweights ==
On 7 May 2011, at Alexandra Palace, London, the 18th installment of the Prizefighter competition showcased an international field of boxers from heavyweight division for the first time.

The winner of the tournament was Mike Perez. Perez beat Kertson Manswell, Gregory Tony and Tye Fields to win the title - dispatching both opponents in the semi-final and final, Tony and Fields respectively, by first round stoppage.

Quarter-finals
Mike Perez	U-PTS
Kertson Manswell
Gregory Tony	SD
Evgeny Orlov
Tye Fields	SD
Michael Sprott
Lucian Bot
Konstantin Airich	U-PTS

Semi-finals
Mike Perez	TKO 1
Gregory Tony
Tye Fields	TKO 1
Konstantin Airich

Final
Mike Perez	TKO 1
Tye Fields

== Prizefighter 19: The Welterweights II ==
On 7 June 2011, at York Hall, Bethnal Green, the 19th installment of the Prizefighter competition showcased a field of boxers from the welterweight division for the second time that included former world champion Junior Witter.

Moroccan fighter Yassine El maachi won the tournament, beating Peter McDonagh, Colin Lynes and pre-tournament favourite Junior Witter by unanimous, split and majority decisions respectively to claim the Prizefighter trophy.

El Maachi suffered a serious knee injury and has not boxed since.

Quarter-finals
Kevin McIntyre	U-PTS
John Wayne Hibbert
Junior Witter	U-PTS
Nathan Graham
Bobby Gladman
Colin Lynes	U-PTS
Peter McDonagh
Yassine El maachi	U-PTS

Semi-finals
Kevin McIntyre
Junior Witter	U-PTS
Colin Lynes
Yassine El maachi	SD

Final
Junior Witter
Yassine El maachi	MD

== Prizefighter 20: The Light Middleweights II ==
On 15 September 2011, at York Hall, Bethnal Green, the 20th installment of the Prizefighter competition showcased a field of boxers from the light middleweight division.

Robert Lloyd-Taylor won the tournament, beating Takaloo by split decision in the quarter-finals, Peter Vaughan by TKO 15 seconds from the end of the semi-final and earned a unanimous points victory over Liverpudlian Nick Quigley in the final.

Quarter-finals
Robert Lloyd-Taylor	SD
Takaloo
Wayne Goddard
Peter Vaughan	SD
Jeff Thomas
Kris Agyei-Dua	D^
Steve Harkin
Nick Quigley	U-PTS

Semi-finals
Robert Lloyd-Taylor	TKO3
Peter Vaughan
Kris Agyei-Dua
Nick Quigley	U-PTS

Final
Robert Lloyd-Taylor	U-PTS
Nick Quigley

^ Kris Agyei-Dua won 29–28 on referee Terry O'Connor's card after the judges scored the contest a majority draw.

== Prizefighter 21: The Super Flyweights ==
On 12 October 2011, at the Liverpool Olympia, the 21st installment of the Prizefighter competition showcased a field of boxers from the super flyweight division for the first time.

Lee Haskins won the tournament, getting through all his fights by unanimous decision. He beat Terry Broadbent in the quarter-final, Ryan Farrag in the semi-final and overcame Don Broadhurst in the final.

Quarter-finals
Don Broadhurst	U-PTS
Usman Ahmed
Mike Robinson	U-PTS
Nathan Reeve
Lee Haskins	U-PTS
Terry Broadbent
Ryan Farrag	U-PTS
Craig Lyon

Semi-finals
Don Broadhurst	SD
Mike Robinson
Lee Haskins	U-PTS
Ryan Farrag

Final
Don Broadhurst
Lee Haskins	U-PTS

== Prizefighter 22: The Featherweights ==
On 29 October 2011, at York Hall, Bethnal Green, the 22nd installment of the Prizefighter competition showcased another weight division first, this time it was a field of boxers from the featherweight division.

Mongolian veteran Choi Tseveenpurev won the tournament, with the fan-favorite beating Lee Glover in the quarter-final with a second-round KO, before eliminating George Jupp in the semi-final and overcoming Welshman Rhys Roberts in the final.

Quarter-finals
Choi Tseveenpurev	KO2
Lee Glover
George Jupp	TKO2
Lee Jennings
Rhys Roberts	U-PTS
Ian Bailey
Troy James	U-PTS
Barrington Brown

Semi-finals
Choi Tseveenpurev	U-PTS
George Jupp
Rhys Roberts	U-PTS
Troy James

Final
Choi Tseveenpurev	U-PTS
Rhys Roberts

== Prizefighter 23: The Light Welterweights II ==
On 11 February 2012, at Civic Hall, Wolverhampton, the 23rd installment of the Prizefighter competition showcased fighters from the light-welterweight division for the second time.

Rising star Adil Anwar won the tournament, winning all three of his fights by unanimous decision. Anwar beat Barry Morrison in the quarter-final, before eliminating the heavily supported John Watson in the semi-final and overcame a spirited effort from Tyrone Nurse in the final to lift the Prizefighter trophy.

Quarter-finals
Young Mutley	SD
Mark Lloyd
Tyrone Nurse	TKO3
Dale Miles
Adil Anwar	U-PTS
Barry Morrison
John Watson	TKO1
Dean Harrison

Semi-finals
Young Mutley
Tyrone Nurse	U-PTS
Adil Anwar	U-PTS
John Watson

Final
Tyrone Nurse
Adil Anwar	U-PTS

== Prizefighter 24: All-Irish Middleweights ==
On 5 May 2012, the Prizefighter series went to Belfast for the first time. At the King's Hall, Belfast, the 24th installment of the Prizefighter competition showcased Irish fighters from the middleweight division. It was the first Prizefighter event that Betfair were title sponsors.

Former amateur star Eamonn O'Kane won the tournament to the crowd's delight. He beat Anthony Fitzgerald by split decision in the quarter-final, before eliminating Ryan Greene in the semi-final with a brutal first-round knockout and overcame the long reach of JJ McDonagh in the final to take home the £32,000 winners cheque.

Quarter-finals
Eamonn O'Kane	SD
Anthony Fitzgerald
Ryan Greene	U-PTS
Ciaran Healy
JJ McDonagh	U-PTS
Darren Cruise
Joe Rea	U-PTS
Simon O'Donnell

Semi-finals
Eamonn O'Kane	TKO1
Ryan Greene
JJ McDonagh	U-PTS
Joe Rea

Final
Eamonn O'Kane	U-PTS
JJ McDonagh

== Prizefighter 25: The International Heavyweights II ==
On 20 June 2012, at York Hall, Bethnal Green, the 25th installment of the Prizefighter competition showcased an international field of fighters from the heavyweight division for the second time. In a first for Prizefighter, grime star Clement Marfo performed his single 'Champion' in the ring before the action begun.

American Tor Hamer shocked the bookies when he beat the pre-tournament favorite, Kevin Johnson, in the final to win the £32,000. Hamer, who holds a university degree, had beaten the Brazilian big hitter Marcelo Nascimento in the quarters and the Englishman Tom Dallas in the semis to reach the last two.

Quarter-finals
Albert Sosnowski	SD
Maurice Harris
Kevin Johnson	TKO1
Noureddine Meddoune
Tor Hamer	U-PTS
Marcelo Nascimento
Tom Dallas	TKO3
Tom Little

Semi-finals
Albert Sosnowski
Kevin Johnson	SD
Tor Hamer	TKO1
Tom Dallas

Final
Kevin Johnson
Tor Hamer	U-PTS

== Prizefighter 26: The Lightweights II ==
On 6 October 2012, at Liverpool Olympia, the 26th installment of the Prizefighter competition showcased field of Liverpudlian and Mancunian fighters from the lightweight division. Dubbed 'Rocky and the Betfair Prizefighters', previous Prizefighter winner Rocky Fielding took on Carl Dilks for the vacant English super-middleweight title after the Prizefighter tournament. The eight man line-up was described by many in the build-up as the best ever and included former British title holders Derry Mathews, Gary Sykes and Anthony Crolla.

Mancunian Terry Flanagan defied the odds to maintain his unbeaten record and win the coveted Betfair Prizefighter trophy. Flanagan, a 10-1 shot at the start of the night, claimed the £32,000 winner's cheque with a split decision victory over Gary Sykes in the final, having overcome Patrick Liam Walsh in his quarter-final and a bloodied Derry Mathews in the semi-final.

Quarter-finals
Derry Mathews	U-PTS
Jamie Spence
Terry Flanagan	U-PTS
Liam Patrick Walsh
Anthony Crolla	U-PTS
Stephen Jennings
Gary Sykes	U-PTS
Tommy Coyle

Semi-finals
Derry Mathews
Terry Flanagan	U-PTS
Anthony Crolla
Gary Sykes	SD

Final
Terry Flanagan	SD
Gary Sykes

== Prizefighter 27: The Light Middleweights III ==
On 3 November 2012, at York Hall, Bethnal Green, the 27th installment of the Prizefighter competition showcased a field of fighters from the light middleweight division. The eight participants were: Craig McEwan 21(10)-2, Navid Mansouri 8(3)-0-1, Curtis Valentine 5(4)-2, Terry Carruthers 11(1)-13-6, Kris Carslaw 16(4)-2, Ryan Toms 11(6)-3-1, Larry Ekundayo 2(1)-0 and Peter Vaughan 6(1)-1-1.

In the buildup to the competition promoter Eddie Hearn announced that he had added a new knockout bonus, with £2,000 handed out for every stoppage on the night. "I think the new knockout bonus will make things very interesting," said Hearn. "The last Prizefighter in Liverpool was a cracker but we didn't have one stoppage or KO in the event. It's what the fans want to see and with this incentive, I believe the fighters will be more inclined to get their opponent out of there before the final bell."

Local fighter Larry Ekundayo, coming into the competition with only two fight's experience, defied the odds to win the coveted Betfair Prizefighter trophy. Ekundayo, who became his manager Spencer Fearon's second Prizefighter champ after Choi won last year, claimed the £32,000 winner's cheque plus a £2,000 KO bonus with a stoppage victory over Terry Carruthers in the final. He had previously beaten two Scot's to get there with a win over the pre-tournament favourite, Craig McEwan, in the opening quarter-final and Kris Carslaw in the semi.

Quarter-finals
Larry Ekundayo	SD
Craig McEwan
Kris Carslaw	SD
Ryan Toms
Terry Carruthers	UD
Peter Vaughan
Navid Mansouri	SD
Curtis Valentine

Semi-finals
Larry Ekundayo	SD
Kris Carslaw
Terry Carruthers	SD
Navid Mansouri

Final
Larry Ekundayo	TKO3
Terry Carruthers

== Prizefighter 28: The Welterweights III ==
On 19 January 2013, at the Civic Hall, Wolverhampton, the 28th installment of the Prizefighter competition showcased a field of fighters from the welterweight division. The tournament saw the greatest number of unbeaten fighters enter, with six men starting the night with their '0' intact. The eight participants were: Mark Thompson 24(14)-2, Rob Hunt 16(1)-1-2, Sam Eggington 3(0)-0, Dale Evans 4(3)-0-1, Chad Gaynor 9(4)-0, Calum Cooper 4(0)-0, Steven Pearce 6(1)-0 and Glenn Foot 7(4)-0.

Sunderland fighter Glenn Foot maintained his unbeaten record to win the new-look Betfair Prizefighter trophy. Foot claimed the £32,000 winner's cheque as well as the £2,000 stoppage bonus the 24-year-old earned after a second-round TKO victory over Steven Pearce in the quarter-final. Foot overcome Chad Gaynor in an absorbing semi-final contest before edging out Welsh 21-year-old Dale Evans in the final.

Quarter-finals
Mark Thompson	TKO3
Rob Hunt
Dale Evans	UD
Sam Eggington
Chad Gaynor	TKO1
Calum Cooper
Glenn Foot	TKO2
Steven Pearce

Semi-finals
Mark Thompson
Dales Evans	UD
Chad Gaynor
Glenn Foot	UD

Final
Dale Evans
Glenn Foot	SD

== Prizefighter 29: The International Heavyweights III ==
On 23 February 2013, at York Hall in Bethnal Green, London, the 29th installment of the Prizefighter competition showcased an international field of eight heavyweight fighters from five different countries.

The tournament saw two fighters hoping to become second time Prizefighter champions, Audley Harrison and Martin Rogan. The other six participants were: Derric Rossy, Ian Lewison, Travis Walker, Albert Sosnowski, Claus Bertino and Timo Hoffmann.

Audley Harrison, 2000 Olympics gold medalist, rolled back the years to become the first ever two-time Prizefighter champion and win the new-look Betfair Prizefighter trophy. He claimed the £32,000 winner's cheque as well as £4,000 in stoppage bonuses the 41-year-old earned after TKO victories in the quarter-final and the final. Harrison overcome Martin Rogan, keeping the Belfast fighter at the end of his jab, in an absorbing semi-final contest before stopping American Derric Rossy in the second round of the final.

Quarter-finals
Martin Rogan	TKO 3
Albert Sosnowski
Audley Harrison	TKO 1
Claus Bertino
Ian Lewison	TKO 1
Timo Hoffmann
Derric Rossy	SD
Travis Walker

Semi-finals
Martin Rogan
Audley Harrison	UD
Ian Lewison
Derric Rossy	SD

Final
Audley Harrison	TKO 2
Derric Rossy

== Prizefighter 30: The Cruiserweights III ==
On 18 May 2013, at York Hall in Bethnal Green, London, the 30th installment of the Prizefighter competition showcased a field of eight Cruiserweight fighters from the UK.

The tournament saw one of the most inexperienced fields seen in Prizefighter. Danny McIntosh (13-4), coming down from light-heavyweight, with 17 bouts on his record was the veteran of the group. The other six participants were: Wadi Camacho (6-1), Conall Carmichael (4-0), Tony Conquest (10-1), Neil Dawson (11-1), Shane McPhilbin (8-6), Nathan Owens (5-0-1) and Hari Miles (7-7).

Quarter-finals
Wadi Camacho	UD
Martyn Grainger
Nathan Owens	SD
Shane McPhilbin
Hari Miles	UD
Conall Carmichael
Danny McIntosh	UD
Neil Dawson

Semi-finals
Wadi Camacho	UD
Nathan Owens
Hari Miles	UD
Danny McIntosh

Final
Wadi Camacho	KO 2
Hari Miles

== Prizefighter 31: The Light Welterweights III ==
On 6 July 2013, at York Hall in Bethnal Green, London, the 31st installment of the Prizefighter competition showcased a field of eight light-welterweight fighters from the UK.

The tournament saw an almost exclusive field of London-based fighters take part in this edition of Prizefighter. Eventual winner, Welshman Chris Jenkins (7-0), came in to replace injured Chris Evangelou to buck the cockney trend. The other seven participants were: Southern Area champ Danny Connor (8-5-1), Southern Area lightweight belt holder Liam Shinkwin (6-0-1), Charlie Rice (6-0), Ryan Taylor (7-1-1), Matty Tew (12-1), Eren Arif (3-0) and Tony Owen (14-1).

Quarter-finals
Danny Connor	UD
Charlie Rice
Ryan Taylor	UD
Matty Tew
Eren Arif	UD
Liam Shinkwin
Chris Jenkins	UD
Tony Owen

Semi-finals
Danny Connor	UD
Ryan Taylor
Eren Arif
Chris Jenkins	UD

Final
Danny Connor
Chris Jenkins	TKO 2

== Prizefighter 32: UK vs. USA International Heavyweights ==
On 14 November 2013, at York Hall in Bethnal Green, London, the 32nd installment of the Prizefighter competition showcased a field of eight heavyweight fighters from the UK and the USA.

The tournament saw a field of eight fighters, four from the UK and four from the US, take part in this special edition of Prizefighter.

Former Prizefighter finalist Michael Sprott was joined by Hackney's Larry Olubamiwo, Milton Keynes’ Matt Legg and Hertfordshire's Tom Little in Team UK, who faced up to a Team USA boasting former three-weight World Champion James Toney in its ranks. Toney was joined in the US quartet by Californian Damian Wills, former World Cruiserweight challenger Brian Minto and Florida's Jason Gavern.

In the Prizefighter prospect slots, Olympic Gold medalist Anthony Joshua MBE fought Croatian Hrvoje Kisicek in his third pro fight while Cruiserweight prospect Ben Ileyemi clashed with Moses Matovu in his second pro outing.

Quarter-finals
Jason Gavern	UD
Larry Olubamiwo
James Toney	TKO 3
Matt Legg
Michael Sprott	UD
Damian Wills
Brian Minto	SD
Tom Little

Semi-finals
Jason Gavern	MD
James Toney
Michael Sprott	UD
Brian Minto

Final
Jason Gavern
Michael Sprott	UD

== Prizefighter 33: The Lightweights III ==
On 6 December 2014, at York Hall in Bethnal Green, London, the 33rd installment of the Prizefighter competition showcased a field of eight lightweight fighters from the UK and Ireland.

The tournament competitors were: Stephen Foster, Michael Devine, Danny Connor, Gary Buckland, Lee Martin, Floyd Moore, Jono Carroll and Craig Whyatt.

Quarter-finals
Jono Carroll	SD
Stepher Foster
Gary Buckland	UD
Floyd Moore
Michael Devine	UD
Danny Connor
Lee Martin	SD
Craig Whyatt

Semi-finals
Jono Carroll	SD
Gary Buckland
Michael Devine	TKO 1
Lee Martin

Final
Jono Carroll	UD
Michael Devine

== Prizefighter 34: The Welterweights IV ==
On 5 April 2014, at York Hall in Bethnal Green, London, the 34th installment of the Prizefighter competition showcased a field of eight welterweight fighters from the UK.

The tournament competitors were: Dean Byrne (17-3-1), Jason Cook (30-5-1), Johnny Coyle (3-0-1), Mark Douglas (8-3), Sam Eggington (8-1), Paddy Gallagher (4-0), Johnny Garton (11-0) and Erick Ochieng (14-0).

Quarter-finals
Erick Ochieng	UD
Paddy Gallagher
Mark Douglas	UD
Dean Byrne
Sam Eggington	TKO 2
Johnny Garton
Johnny Coyle	UD
Jason Cook

Semi-finals
Paddy Gallagher	TKO 1
Mark Douglas
Sam Eggington
Johnny Coyle	SD

Final
Paddy Gallagher
Johnny Coyle	UD

== Prizefighter 35: The Middleweights III ==
On 14 February 2015, at the Winter Gardens in Blackpool, the 35th installment of the Prizefighter competition showcased a field of eight middleweight fighters from the UK.

The tournament competitors were: Jack Arnfield (17-0), Liam Conroy (7-2-0), Luke Crowcroft (8-1), Craig Cunningham (11-0), Tom Doran (11-0), Mick Hall (11-0), Luke Keeler (7-0) and Cello Renda (25-10-2) .

Quarter-finals
Cello Renda	TKO 1
Liam Conroy
Jack Arnfield	SD
Mick Hall
Luke Keeler	UD
Luke Crowcoft
Tom Doran	UD
Craig Cunningham

Semi-finals
Cello Renda	SD
Jack Arnfield
Luke Keeler
Tom Doran	UD

Final
Cello Renda
Tom Doran	TKO 3

== Tournament summary ==
Tournament Date	Venue	Weight Category	Winner	Runner-Up
11 April 2008	York Hall, Bethnal Green	Heavyweight	Martin Rogan	David Dolan
12 September 2008	Metro Radio Arena, Newcastle	Heavyweight	Sam Sexton	Chris Burton
24 October 2008	York Hall, Bethnal Green	Welterweight	Michael Lomax	Ted Bami
21 November 2008	York Hall, Bethnal Green	Middleweight	Martin Murray	Cello Renda
20 February 2009	York Hall, Bethnal Green	Light heavyweight	Tony Oakey	Darren Stubbs
24 March 2009	Kelvin Hall, Glasgow	Lightweight	Ryan Brawley	Stephen Burke
19 May 2009	Earls Court, London	Cruiserweight	Ovill McKenzie	John Keeton
2 October 2009	ExCeL, London	Heavyweight	Audley Harrison	Coleman Barrett
4 December 2009	Olympia, London	Light welterweight	Gavin Rees	Colin Lynes
26 February 2010	York Hall, Bethnal Green	Light middleweight	Prince Arron	Brett Flournoy
30 April 2010	York Hall, Bethnal Green	Cruiserweight	Jon-Lewis Dickinson	Nick Okoth
29 May 2010	York Hall, Bethnal Green	Super bantamweight	Willie Casey	Paul McElhinney
30 June 2010	York Hall, Bethnal Green	Super middleweight	Patrick Mendy	Paul David
9 October 2010	York Hall, Bethnal Green	Heavyweight	Michael Sprott	Matt Skelton
21 November 2010	York Hall, Bethnal Green	Super featherweight	Gary Buckland	Derry Mathews
29 January 2011	Olympia, London	Light heavyweight	Travis Dickinson	Sam Couzens
23 March 2011	Olympia, Liverpool	Super middleweight	Rocky Fielding	Tobias Webb
7 May 2011	Alexandra Palace, London	International Heavyweight	Mike Perez	Tye Fields
7 June 2011	York Hall, Bethnal Green	Welterweight	Yassine El maachi	Junior Witter
15 September 2011	York Hall, Bethnal Green	Light middleweight	Robert Lloyd-Taylor	Nick Quigley
12 October 2011	Olympia, Liverpool	Super flyweight	Lee Haskins	Don Broadhurst
29 October 2011	York Hall, Bethnal Green	Featherweight	Choi Tseveenpurev	Rhys Roberts
11 February 2012	Civic Hall, Wolverhampton	Light welterweight	Adil Anwar	Tyrone Nurse
5 May 2012	Kings Hall, Belfast	Irish Middleweight	Eamonn O'Kane	JJ McDonagh
20 June 2012	York Hall, Bethnal Green	International Heavyweight	Tor Hamer	Kevin Johnson
6 October 2012	Olympia, Liverpool	Lightweight	Terry Flanagan	Gary Sykes
3 November 2012	York Hall, Bethnal Green	Light middleweight	Larry Ekundayo	Terry Carruthers
19 January 2013	Civic Hall, Wolverhampton	Welterweight	Glenn Foot	Dale Evans
23 February 2013	York Hall, Bethnal Green	International Heavyweight	Audley Harrison	Derric Rossy
18 May 2013	York Hall, Bethnal Green	Cruiserweight	Wadi Camacho	Hari Miles
6 July 2013	York Hall, Bethnal Green	Welterweight	Chris Jenkins	Danny Connor
14 November 2013	York Hall, Bethnal Green	UK vs USA Heavyweight	Michael Sprott	Jason Gavern
5 April 2014	York Hall, Bethnal Green	Welterweight	Johnny Coyle	Paddy Gallagher
6 December 2014	York Hall, Bethnal Green	Lightweight	Jono Carroll	Michael Devine
14 February 2015	Winter Gardens, Blackpool	Middleweight	Tom Doran	Cello Renda
