= Jon-Lewis Dickinson =

British boxer

Personal information
- Nationality: British
- Born: 3 May 1986 (age 40) Durham, England
- Height: 6 ft 4 in (193 cm)
- Weight: Cruiserweight

Boxing career
- Stance: Orthodox

Boxing record
- Total fights: 22
- Wins: 17
- Win by KO: 5
- Losses: 5

Jon-Lewis Dickinson (born 3 May 1986) is from Edmondsley in County Durham and is a British former professional boxer who competed from 2008 to 2016. He held the British cruiserweight title from 2012 to 2014 and challenged once for the Commonwealth cruiserweight title in 2014.

In his early fights he beat journeymen Paul Bonson and Hastings Rasani on points, before winning the Prizefighter series in April 2010 beating Leon Williams, Mark Krence and Nick Okoth. In July, however, he suffered a shock knockout loss to Tyrone Wright, and followed it up by retiring on his stool against Richard Turba, after suffering a badly broken jaw, which prevented him boxing for the following 12 months.

Dickinson returned in July 2011 with a win over 2002 Commonwealth Games gold medallist David Dolan before beating Chris Burton in February 2012. He won the English cruiserweight title in March 2012 with a UD10 win over Matty Askin, in a fight that was also a British title eliminator. Dickinson won the British Cruiserweight title in October 2012, beating former champion Shane McPhilbin by unanimous decision, in a challenge for the vacant title at the Echo Arena Liverpool. After three successful defences, which saw him retain the Lord Lonsdale belt outright, he lost the title in June 2014 at the Metro Radio Arena when he was stopped in the second round by Ovill McKenzie. He KO’d Scotland’s Stephen Simmons to take the WBC Continental silver title.

His younger brother Travis Dickinson is also a professional boxer who fights at light-heavyweight, and also won Prizefighter in January 2011. The pair are the only brothers ever to win Prizefighter.

== Professional boxing record ==
22 fights	17 wins	5 losses
By knockout	5	3
By decision	12	2

No.	Result	Record	Opponent	Type	Round, time	Date	Location	Notes
22	Loss	17–5	Tommy McCarthy	UD	10	28 May 2016	The SSE Hydro, Glasgow, Scotland	
21	Win	17–4	Jiri Svacina	PTS	6	26 Mar 2016	Gateshead Leisure Centre, Gateshead, England	
20	Win	16–4	Stephen Simmons	TKO	8 (10)	4 Apr 2015	Metro Radio Arena, Newcastle, England	Won WBC International Silver cruiserweight title
19	Loss	15–4	Courtney Fry	PTS	10	29 Nov 2014	Gateshead Leisure Centre, Gateshead, England	
18	Loss	15–3	Ovill McKenzie	TKO	2 (12)	7 Jun 2014	Metro Radio Arena, Newcastle, England	Lost British cruiserweight title; For Commonwealth cruiserweight title
17	Win	15–2	Neil Dawson	TKO	10 (12)	29 Mar 2014	Metro Radio Arena, Newcastle, England	Retained British cruiserweight title
16	Win	14–2	Mike Stafford	UD	12	19 Apr 2013	Rainton Meadows Arena, Houghton-le-Spring, England	Retained British cruiserweight title
15	Win	13–2	David Dolan	UD	12	15 Feb 2013	Rainton meadows Arena, Houghton-le-Spring, England	Retained British cruiserweight title
14	Win	12–2	Shane McPhilbin	UD	12	13 Oct 2012	Echo Arena, Liverpool, England	Won vacant British cruiserweight title
13	Win	11–2	Matty Askin	UD	10	21 Apr 2012	Oldham Sports Centre, Oldham, England	Won vacant English cruiserweight title
12	Win	10–2	Chris Burton	TKO	2 (10)	25 Feb 2012	Aberdeen Exhibition and Conference Centre, Aberdeen, Scotland	
11	Win	9–2	David Dolan	PTS	10	3 Jul 2011	Stadium of Light, Sunderland, England	Won vacant Northern Area cruiserweight title
10	Loss	8–2	Richard Turba	RTD	3 (6)	11 Sep 2010	Rainton Meadows Arena, Houghton-le-Spring, England	
9	Loss	8–1	Tyrone Wright	TKO	3 (6)	23 Jul 2010	Rainton Meadows Arena, Houghton-le-Spring, England	
8	Win	8–0	Nick Okoth	KO	3 (3)	30 Apr 2010	York Hall, London, England	Prizefighter: The Cruiserweights II - Final
7	Win	7–0	Mark Krence	RTD	1 (3)	30 Apr 2010	York Hall, London, England	Prizefighter: The Cruiserweights II - Semi-final
6	Win	6–0	Leon Williams	SD	3	30 Apr 2010	York Hall, London, England	Prizefighter: The Cruiserweights II - Quarter-final
5	Win	5–0	Martyn Grainger	PTS	4	16 Oct 2009	Seaburn Centre, Sunderland, England	
4	Win	4–0	Hastings Rasani	PTS	4	10 Jul 2009	Seaburn Centre, Sunderland, England	
3	Win	3–0	Nick Okoth	PTS	4	2 May 2009	Crowtree Leisure Centre, Sunderland, England	
2	Win	2–0	John Anthony	PTS	4	23 Jan 2009	Fenton Manner Sports Complex, Stoke-on-Trent, England	
1	Win	1–0	Paul Bonson	PTS	4	7 Nov 2008	Robin Park Centre, Wigan, England	
