= Chas Symonds =

English boxer (born 1982)

Personal information
- Nickname: The Bomb
- Nationality: (England) English
- Born: Chas Symonds; 8 July 1982 (age 44) Croydon, England
- Years active: 2003–2015 (Boxing); 2021–present (Bare-knuckle boxing)
- Height: 5 ft 6 in (1.68 m)
- Weight: Welterweight

Boxing career
- Stance: Orthodox

Boxing record
- Total fights: 27
- Wins: 18
- Win by KO: 5
- Losses: 9
- Draws: 0
- No contests: 0

Chas 'Chasa' Symonds (born 8 July 1982) is a former English professional welterweight boxer. He is the former two time BBBofC Southern Area welterweight title holder.

He currently fights bare-knuckle for the BKFC.

== Personal life ==
Symonds was born and raised in Croydon, United Kingdom. He has spoken openly on his issues with drug addiction. He has now been sober for several years.

== Career ==
=== Boxing ===
Symonds initially retired from professional boxing in 2005 following his English Southern area welterweight title defeat, to Ross Minter by TKO but returned to the ring in June 2008 to defeat Paul Morby. He retired for a second time in 2015 after 27 fights, winning 18 and losing 9.

=== Bare-knuckle boxing ===
Symonds began bare-knuckle boxing in 2021. He is coached by Jason Matthews. He is currently signed to Conor McGregor's Bare Knuckle Fighting Championship.

=== Actor ===
In 2021, Symonds starred in Rise of the Footsoldier: Origins as DJ Brandon Block alongside Vinnie Jones.

== Professional boxing record ==
27 fights	18 wins	9 losses
By knockout	5	4
By decision	13	5

Key to abbreviations used for results
DQ	Disqualification	RTD	Corner retirement
KO	Knockout	SD	Split decision / split draw
MD	Majority decision / majority draw	TD	Technical decision / technical draw
NC	No contest	TKO	Technical knockout
PTS	Points decision	UD	Unanimous decision / unanimous draw

Boxing record
No.	Result	Record	Opponent	Type	Round(s), time	Date	Location	Notes
27	Loss	18-9	Michael Lomax	TKO	7	Mar 2015	York Hall, Bethnal Green	
26	Loss	18-8	Michael Lomax	PTS	10	Sept 2014	York Hall, Bethnal Green	
25	Win	18-7	Liam Griffiths	PTS	4	Mar 2014	York Hall, Bethnal Green	
24	Loss	17-7	Steve O'Meara	PTS	6	Mar 2014	Wembley Arena, Wembley	
23	Loss	17-6	Bradley Skeete	TKO	4	Apr 2013	ExCel Arena, Dockland	Lost BBBofC Southern Area Welterweight Title
22	Win	17-5	Darryl Still	PTS	10	Dec 2012	Coronet Theatre, Elephant & Castle, Southwark	Won vacant BBBofC Southern Area Welterweight Title
21	Win	16-5	Sergejs Volodins	PTS	4	Apr 2012	The Troxy, Limehouse	
20	Loss	15-5	Gavin Tait	PTS	10	Mar 2012	Coronet Theatre, Elephant & Castle, Southwark	Lost vacant BBBofC Southern Area Welterweight Title
19	Win	15-4	Jason Nesbitt	PTS	4	Sep 2011	York Hall, Bethnal Green	
18	Loss	14-4	Badru Lusambya	TK0	4	May 2011	York Hall, Bethnal Green	
17	Loss	14-3	Tom Glover	PTS	8	Mar 2009	Aston Events Centre, Birmingham	
16	Loss	14-2	Tomas Grublys	PTS	4	Nov 2008	York Hall, Bethnal Green	
15	Win	14-1	Alex Spitko	TKO	3	Jul 2008	Goresbrook Leisure Centre, Dagenham	
14	Win	13-1	Paul Morby	PTS	6	Jun 2008	Mountbatten Centre, Portsmouth	
13	Loss	12-1	Ross Minter	TKO	3	Apr 2005	Elephant & Castle Centre, Southwark	Lost BBBofC Southern Area Welterweight Title
12	Win	12-0	Peter Dunn	PTS	4	Feb 2005	Conference Centre, Wembley	Retained BBBofC Southern Area Welterweight Title
11	Win	11-0	Keith Jones	PTS	10	Sep 2004	York Hall, Bethnal Green	Retained BBBofC Southern Area Welterweight Title
10	Win	10-0	Brett James	TKO	4	Jun 2004	York Hall, Bethnal Green	Won BBBofC Southern Area Welterweight Title
9	Win	9-0	Robert Lloyd-Taylor	RTD	5	May 2004	York Hall, Bethnal Green	
8	Win	8-0	Geraint Harvey	PTS	4	Apr 2004	Rivermead Leisure Centre, Reading	
7	Win	7-0	David Wakefield	TKO	5	Feb 2004	York Hall, Bethnal Green	
6	Win	6-0	Ernie Smith	PTS	6	Nov 2003	York Hall, Bethnal Green	
5	Win	5-0	Ben Hudson	PTS	6	Sept 2003	York Hall, Bethnal Green	
4	Win	4-0	Peter Buckley	PTS	6	Jul 2003	York Hall, Bethnal Green	
3	Win	3-0	Arv Mittoo	PTS	6	Jun 2003	York Hall, Bethnal Green	
2	Win	2-0	Lee Bedell	PTS	4	Apr 2003	York Hall, Bethnal Green	
1	Win	1-0	Darren Goode	TKO	2	Feb 2003	York Hall, Bethnal Green	Pro debut for Symonds

== Bare knuckle record ==
Professional record breakdown
4 matches	1 win	3 losses
By knockout	1	2
By decision	0	1

Res.	Record	Opponent	Method	Event	Date	Round	Time	Location	Notes
Loss	1–3	Aaron Chalmers	KO	BKFC 72 Dubai: Day 2	April 5, 2025	3	0:55	Dubai, United Arab Emirates	
Loss	1–2	Franco Tenaglia	TKO	BKFC 27	August 20, 2022	2	1:58	London, England	
Win	1–1	Wes O'Neill	KO	BKB 21	August 14, 2021	1	1:52	London, England	
Loss	0–1	Jonny Lawson	Decision (majority)	BKB Lockdown 2	March 27, 2021	4	2:00	London, England	
