= Tom Doran (boxer) =

Welsh boxer

Personal information
- Nickname: Dazzlin'
- Nationality: Welsh
- Born: 7 August 1987 (age 38) Connah's Quay, Flintshire, Wales
- Height: 5 ft 10 in (178 cm)
- Weight: Middleweight

Boxing career
- Reach: 70 in (178 cm)
- Stance: Orthodox

Boxing record
- Total fights: 18
- Wins: 17
- Win by KO: 7
- Losses: 1

Tom Doran (born 7 August 1987) is a Welsh professional boxer. He held the WBC International middleweight title in 2016, and has challenged once for the British middleweight title in the same year. Outside of boxing, Doran works as an aircraft maintenance technician.

== Amateur career ==
Doran fought as an amateur for Shotton Amateur Boxing Club, in the welterweight division.

== Professional career ==
On 23 May 2009, Doran made his professional debut in a four-round points decision victory over Alex Spitko. After defeating Max Maxwell via first-round stoppage on 20 May 2011, Doran would not fight for three years. He returned to the ring on 24 May 2014 to score a six-round points decision over Harry Matthews. On 14 February 2015, Doran won the Prizefighter middleweight tournament, earning £32,000 after stopping Cello Renda in the third round of the final.

Doran won his first regional championship—the vacant WBC International middleweight title—in an action-packed two rounds against Luke Keeler on 2 April 2016. In round one, both fighters scored knockdowns; Doran went on to finish Keeler in the second round with two further knockdowns. On 25 June 2016, Doran faced British middleweight champion Chris Eubank Jr. on the undercard of Anthony Joshua vs. Dominic Breazeale, but was stopped (and knocked down four times) after four one-sided rounds.

== Professional boxing record ==
18 fights	17 wins	1 loss
By knockout	7	1
By decision	10	0

No.	Result	Record	Opponent	Type	Round, time	Date	Location	Notes
18	Loss	17–1	Chris Eubank Jr.	TKO	4 (12), 2:35	25 Jun 2016	The O2 Arena, London, England	For British middleweight title
17	Win	17–0	Luke Keeler	TKO	2 (10), 1:37	2 Apr 2016	Echo Arena, Liverpool, England	Won vacant WBC International middleweight title
16	Win	16–0	Rod Smith	KO	3 (10), 1:15	7 Nov 2015	Echo Arena, Liverpool, England	
15	Win	15–0	Mike Byles	TKO	5 (6), 2:37	26 Jun 2015	Echo Arena, Liverpool, England	
14	Win	14–0	Cello Renda	TKO	3 (3), 1:16	14 Feb 2015	Winter Gardens, Blackpool, England	Prizefighter 35: middleweight final
13	Win	13–0	Luke Keeler	UD	3	14 Feb 2015	Winter Gardens, Blackpool, England	Prizefighter 35: middleweight semi-final
12	Win	12–0	Craig Cunningham	UD	3	14 Feb 2015	Winter Gardens, Blackpool, England	Prizefighter 35: middleweight quarter-final
11	Win	11–0	Harry Matthews	PTS	6	24 May 2014	Deeside Leisure Centre, Queensferry, Wales	
10	Win	10–0	Max Maxwell	TKO	1 (10), 2:42	20 May 2011	Deeside Leisure Centre, Queensferry, Wales	
9	Win	9–0	Jamie Boness	TKO	1 (6), 1:27	26 Mar 2011	Robin Park Arena and Sports Centre, Wigan, England	
8	Win	8–0	Dee Mitchell	PTS	6	5 Dec 2010	Racecourse, Chester, England	
7	Win	7–0	Terry Adams	TKO	1 (4), 1:56	6 Nov 2010	Castle Leisure Centre, Bury, England	
6	Win	6–0	Jonny Musgrave	PTS	6	29 May 2010	Castle Leisure Centre, Bury, England	
5	Win	5–0	Janis Cernauskis	PTS	4	26 Mar 2010	Goresbrook Leisure Centre, London, England	
4	Win	4–0	Darren Gethin	PTS	6	28 Nov 2009	Deeside Leisure Centre, Queensferry, Wales	
3	Win	3–0	Ryan Clark	PTS	4	26 Sep 2009	Deeside Leisure Centre, Queensferry, Wales	
2	Win	2–0	Craig Tomes	PTS	6	25 Jul 2009	Sutton Leisure Centre, St Helens, England	
1	Win	1–0	Alex Spitko	PTS	4	23 May 2009	Deeside Leisure Centre, Queensferry, Wales	

Sporting positions
Regional boxing titles
Vacant Title last held by Jorge Sebastian Heiland	WBC International middleweight champion 2 April 2016 – October 2016; Vacated	Vacant Title next held by Craig Cunningham
Honorary boxing titles
Previous: Rocky Fielding	Prizefighter 35: middleweight tournament champion 14 February 2015	Incumbent
