= Matty Askin =

English boxer (born 1988)

Personal information
- Nickname: Assassin
- Nationality: British
- Born: Matthew Askin; 24 December 1988 (age 37) Barnsley, Yorkshire, England
- Height: 6 ft 4 in (193 cm)
- Weight: Cruiserweight

Boxing career
- Reach: 77 in (196 cm)
- Stance: Orthodox

Boxing record
- Total fights: 28
- Wins: 23
- Win by KO: 15
- Losses: 4
- Draws: 1

Matthew Askin (born 24 December 1988) is a British former professional boxer who competed from 2008 to 2018. He held the British cruiserweight title from 2017 to 2018 and challenged once for the Commonwealth cruiserweight title in 2015.

== Amateur career ==
Askin boxed for the Pool of Life Amateur Boxing Club and was crowned the 2008 Senior ABA champion at cruiserweight.

== Professional career ==
Askin turned professional in November 2008 after signing with promoter Steve Wood and defeated Paul Bonson at The Tower Ballroom in Blackpool.

In January 2009 he signed with promoter Ricky Hatton and has since taken his record to 11 wins without defeat.

During 2011 Sky Sports short listed Askin as a prospect to watch in 2011.

In March 2011 he won his first title as a professional by knocking out Neil Dawson in six rounds in Wigan. Askin is the former undefeated Central Area Cruiserweight Champion.

=== Askin vs. Glowacki ===
In November 2012 Askin has lost by KO to WBO Cruiserweight champion Krzysztof Glowacki.

=== Askin vs. Edwards ===
In March 2014, Askin successfully defended his English Cruiserweight title against Londoner Menay Edwards.

=== Askin vs. Kennedy ===
On 26 May 2017, Askin stopped Craig Kennedy in the sixth round to become British cruiserweight champion.

=== Askin vs. Simmons ===
In his next fight, Askin defended his British cruiserweight title against Stephen Simmons. Askin finished Simmons within two rounds.

=== Askin vs. Okolie ===
In his following fight, Askin fought undefeated contender Lawrence Okolie, who was ranked #15 by the WBA at the time. Okolie won the fight on all three scorecards, 116-110, 114-113 and 114-112.

== Professional boxing record ==
28 fights	23 wins	4 losses
By knockout	15	1
By decision	8	3
Draws	1	

No.	Result	Record	Opponent	Type	Round, time	Date	Location	Notes
28	Loss	23–4–1	Lawrence Okolie	UD	12	22 Sep 2018	Wembley Stadium, London, England	Lost British cruiserweight title
27	Win	23–3–1	Stephen Simmons	TKO	2 (12), 1:53	17 Mar 2018	York Hall, London, England	Retained British cruiserweight title
26	Win	22–3–1	Craig Kennedy	TKO	6 (12), 2:13	26 May 2017	Motorpoint Arena, Cardiff, Wales	Won British cruiserweight title
25	Win	21–3–1	Tommy McCarthy	UD	12	19 Nov 2016	Victoria Warehouse, Manchester, England	
24	Win	20–3–1	Simon Barclay	TKO	2 (10), 1:18	12 Mar 2016	Echo Arena, Liverpool, England	Retained English cruiserweight title
23	Win	19–3–1	Jiri Svacina	RTD	5 (8), 3:00	12 Dec 2015	Winter Gardens, Blackpool, England	
22	Draw	18–3–1	Lawrence Bennett	TD	1 (10)	17 Oct 2015	York Hall, London, England	Retained English cruiserweight title; Fight stopped when Askin suffered back injury after both boxers fell out of ring
21	Win	18–3	Tamas Bajzath	TKO	2 (6), 2:45	25 Jul 2015	Ellesmere Sports Village, Ellesmere Port, England	
20	Loss	17–3	Ovill McKenzie	MD	12	27 Mar 2015	York Hall, London, England	For British and Commonwealth cruiserweight titles
19	Win	17–2	Menay Edwards	TKO	9 (10), 2:06	29 Mar 2014	Winter Gardens, Blackpool, England	Retained English cruiserweight title
18	Win	16–2	Tayar Mehmed	PTS	6	14 Dec 2013	Robin Park Centre, Wigan, England	
17	Win	15–2	China Clarke	UD	10	20 Apr 2013	Winter Gardens, Blackpool, England	Won English cruiserweight title
16	Loss	14–2	Krzysztof Glowacki	KO	11 (12), 1:16	17 Nov 2012	Hilton Warsaw Hotel, Warsaw, Poland	For WBO Inter-Continental cruiserweight title
15	Win	14–1	Paul Morris	PTS	4	5 Oct 2012	Winter Gardens, Blackpool, England	
14	Loss	13–1	Jon-Lewis Dickinson	UD	10	21 Apr 2012	Oldham Sports Centre, Oldham, England	For vacant English cruiserweight title
13	Win	13–0	Attilo Palko	TKO	2 (6), 1:59	4 Feb 2012	De Vere Whites Hotel, Bolton, England	
12	Win	12–0	Roman Kracik	TKO	3 (10), 2:11	12 Nov 2011	Oldham Sports Centre, Oldham, England	
11	Win	11–0	Juan Manuel Garay	TKO	4 (8), 2:10	19 Aug 2011	Tower Circus, Blackpool, England	
10	Win	10–0	Neil Dawson	TKO	6 (10), 2:48	26 Mar 2011	Robin Park Centre, Wigan, England	Won vacant Central Area cruiserweight title
9	Win	9–0	Mitchell Balker	TKO	3 (6), 3:00	26 Nov 2010	De Vere Whites Hotel, Bolton, England	
8	Win	8–0	John Anthony	PTS	6	2 Oct 2010	De Vere Whites Hotel, Bolton, England	
7	Win	7–0	Lee Kellett	TKO	1 (4), 2:56	16 Jul 2010	Bolton Arena, Bolton, England	
6	Win	6–0	Mathew Ellis	KO	1 (6), 1:50	16 Apr 2010	Robin Park Centre, Wigan, England	
5	Win	5–0	Hastings Rasani	PTS	6	15 Jan 2010	Leisure Centre, Altrincham, England	
4	Win	4–0	Bobby Scott	TKO	2 (4), 0:49	27 Nov 2009	Robin Park Centre, Wigan, England	
3	Win	3–0	Mark Nilsen	TKO	4 (6), 3:00	11 Jul 2009	Leisure Centre, Altrincham, England	
2	Win	2–0	Nick Okoh	PTS	4	24 Jan 2009	Tower Circus, Blackpool, England	
1	Win	1–0	Paul Bonson	PTS	4	22 Nov 2008	Tower Circus, Blackpool, England	
