= Bertino =

Bertino is an Italian surname. Notable people with the surname include:

- Al Bertino (1912–1996), American animator
- Bryan Bertino (born 1977), American film director, producer and screenwriter
- Claus Bertino (born 1980), Danish boxer
- Elisa Bertino, Italian computer scientist
- Joseph R. Bertino (1930–2021), American researcher in the cancer pharmacology program
- Marie-Helene Bertino, American novelist and short story writer
- Tom Bertino, American animator
- Anthony W. "Chip" Bertino, Jr., American Publisher and elected official

== See also ==
- Jennifer Bertino-Tarrant
- Niia (born Niia Bertino), American singer, pianist, and songwriter
