= Johnny Garton =

English boxer

Personal information
- Nickname: The Pexican
- Born: 26 March 1987 (age 39) London, England
- Height: 5 ft 8 in (173 cm)
- Weight: Welterweight

Boxing career
- Stance: Orthodox

Boxing record
- Total fights: 27
- Wins: 24
- Win by KO: 10
- Losses: 2
- Draws: 1

Johnny Garton (born 26 March 1987) is an English former professional boxer from 2011 to 2019. who held the British welterweight title from 2018 to 2019.

== Early life ==
Garton grew up on the Clifton housing estate in Peckham, London, living with his mother and sister in one of the estate's tower blocks. He attended Peckham Park Primary School and then Hatcham Wood secondary school in Brockley. After leaving school he attended college to study car mechanics. Garton first started boxing at age 18 when he went along with a friend to Lynn AC boxing club in Camberwell, London.

== Professional career ==
Garton made his professional debut on 20 October 2011, scoring a four-round points decision (PTS) victory over Danny Donchev at the York Hall in London.

After remaining unbeaten in 11 fights, he took part in the 34th instalment of the Prizefighter series on 5 April 2014 at the York Hall. Garton faced off against Sam Eggington in the quarterfinal, losing via second-round technical knockout (TKO).

On 13 December 2014, he fought Adam Battle at the York Hall for the vacant Southern Area welterweight title, winning by TKO in round eight. He successfully defended the title twice, firstly against Nathan Weise with a fifth-round TKO on 14 March 2015 and against Martin Welsh on 16 May, retaining his title through a points draw.

Following a sixth-round TKO win in a rematch with Welsh in September and a PTS win over Casey Blair in December, Garton faced Ryan Fields for the vacant English welterweight title on 7 May 2016 at the York Hall. Garton won the fight along with the English title with a fourth-round TKO. He defended the title on 17 September 2016 against Tyler Goodjohn, scoring a ten-round unanimous decision (UD) victory. Two judges scored the bout 99–91 while the third scored it 98–92.

After a PTS victory against Geiboord Omier in November 2016 and a sixth-round TKO win over Ivica Gogosevic in April 2017, he went on to defeat Mihail Orlov by tenth-round TKO on 9 December 2017 at the Copper Box Arena in London to capture the vacant IBF European welterweight title.

After defeating Nelson Altamirano in his next outing by second-round knockout (KO) in a stay-busy fight on 23 June 2018, Garton faced former world title challenger Gary Corcoran for the vacant British welterweight title on 20 October, at the Brentwood Centre in Essex. In a bloody fight, which saw Garton suffer a deep cut on the forehead resulting from a clash of heads in the round six, Garton captured the vacant British title via eleventh-round TKO after referee Steve Gray deemed Corcoran unfit to continue following a barrage of unanswered punches. The first defence of his British title came on 8 March 2019 against Chris Jenkins at the Royal Albert Hall in London. Garton lost the title by unanimous decision with the judge's scorecards reading 119–109, 117–112 and 116–112.

== Professional boxing record ==
27 fights	24 wins	2 losses
By knockout	10	1
By decision	14	1
Draws	1	

No.	Result	Record	Opponent	Type	Round, time	Date	Location	Notes
27	Win	24–2–1	Jordan Grannum	PTS	6	14 Dec 2019	York Hall, London, England	
26	Loss	23–2–1	Chris Jenkins	UD	12	8 Mar 2019	Royal Albert Hall, London, England	Lost British welterweight title
25	Win	23–1–1	Gary Corcoran	TKO	11 (12)	20 Oct 2018	Brentwood Centre, Brentwood, England	Won vacant British welterweight title
24	Win	22–1–1	Nelson Altamirano	TKO	3 (8)	23 Jun 2018	The O2 Arena, London, England	
23	Win	21–1–1	Mihail Orlov	KO	10 (12)	8 Dec 2017	Copper Box Arena, London, England	Won vacant IBF European welterweight title
22	Win	20–1–1	Ivica Gogosevic	TKO	6 (6)	22 Apr 2017	York Hall, London, England	
21	Win	19–1–1	Geiboord Omier	PTS	6	18 Nov 2016	Wembley Arena, London, England	
20	Win	18–1–1	Tyler Goodjohn	UD	10	17 Sep 2016	York Hall, London, England	Retained English welterweight title
19	Win	17–1–1	Ryan Fields	TKO	5 (10)	7 May 2016	York Hall, London, England	Won vacant English welterweight title
18	Win	16–1–1	Casey Blair	PTS	6	5 Dec 2015	York Hall, London, England	
17	Win	15–1–1	Martin Welsh	TKO	6 (10)	19 Sep 2015	York Hall, London, England	
16	Draw	14–1–1	Martin Welsh	PTS	10	16 May 2015	York Hall, London, England	Retained Southern Area welterweight title
15	Win	14–1	Nathan Weise	TKO	5 (10)	14 Mar 2015	York Hall, London, England	Retained Southern Area welterweight title
14	Win	13–1	Adam Battle	TKO	8 (10)	13 Dec 2014	York Hall, London, England	Won vacant Southern Area welterweight title
13	Win	12–1	Vasil Vasilev	TKO	5 (6)	11 Oct 2014	York Hall, London, England	
12	Loss	11–1	Sam Eggington	TKO	2 (3)	5 Apr 2014	York Hall, London, England	Prizefighter: The Welterweights IV - Quarterfinal
11	Win	11–0	Stanislav Nenkov	PTS	6	7 Dec 2013	York Hall, London, England	
10	Win	10–0	Laszlo Fazekas	PTS	8	20 Sep 2013	Medway Park Sports Centre, Gillingham, England	
9	Win	9–0	Ivan Godor	PTS	8	5 Jul 2013	Camden Centre, London, England	
8	Win	8–0	Gareth Piper	PTS	6	19 Apr 2013	Britannia International Hotel, London, England	
7	Win	7–0	Kevin McCauley	PTS	6	24 Feb 2013	York Hall, London, England	
6	Win	6–0	Jay Morris	PTS	6	23 Nov 2012	Coronet Theatre, London, England	
5	Win	5–0	Matt Seawright	PTS	4	6 Jul 2012	Coronet Theatre, London, England	
4	Win	4–0	Bheki Moyo	TKO	4 (4)	20 Apr 2012	Coronet Theatre, London, England	
3	Win	3–0	Liam Griffiths	PTS	4	2 Mar 2012	The Troxy, London, England	
2	Win	2–0	Jason Nesbitt	PTS	4	25 Nov 2011	Coronet Theatre, London, England	
1	Win	1–0	Danny Donchev	PTS	4	21 Oct 2011	York Hall, London, England	

Sporting positions
Regional boxing titles
Vacant Title last held by Ahmet Patterson	Southern Area welterweight champion 13 December 2014 – May 2015; Vacated	Vacant Title next held by Tamuka Mucha
Vacant Title last held by Adam Little	English welterweight champion 7 May 2016 – March 2017; Vacated	Vacant Title next held by John O'Donnell
New title	IBF European welterweight champion 9 December 2017 – June 2018; Vacated	Vacant Title next held by Larry Ekundayo
Vacant Title last held by Bradley Skeete	British welterweight champion 20 October 2018 – 8 March 2019	Succeeded by Chris Jenkins
