= Darren Stubbs =

Personal information
- Nickname: Stubby
- Nationality: British
- Born: 1971 (age 54–55) Oldham, England
- Weight: Light-heavyweight

Boxing career
- Stance: Orthodox

Boxing record
- Total fights: 28
- Wins: 21
- Win by KO: 1
- Losses: 7
- Draws: 0

Darren Stubbs (born 1971), better known by the nickname "Stubby", is an English former professional boxer who competed in the light-heavyweight division. Stubbs is best known for reaching the final of the Prizefighter tournament in 2009, which was broadcast nationally on Sky Sports. During his professional career spanning from 2002 to 2011, he held both the UK and International Masters light-heavyweight titles.

== Career ==
Stubbs only began boxing at the age of 29, following a difficult childhood, including suffering abuse. His debut came in June 2002, defeating Adam Cale by TKO. He lost his second bout to Dean Cockburn shortly after.

He finished his career with a record of 21–7–0, retiring following a 2011 loss to Tony Dodson.

== Prizefighter Tournament ==
The most notable fights of Stubbs' professional career came in the nationally televised Prizefighter tournament. Televised on Sky Sports, Stubbs won through to the final of the one-night tournament, besting Steve Spartacus and Carl Dilks. He was originally announced as losing to Dilks, only for the result to be overturned following the discovery of a mistake made on the scorecards. He lost in the final to Tony Oakey.

No.	Result	Opponent	Type	Round	Date	Location
24	Loss	Tony Oakey	PTS	3	20 February 2009	York Hall, London (United Kingdom)
23	Won	Carl Dilks	PTS	3	20 February 2009	York Hall, London (United Kingdom)
22	Won	Steve Spartacus	KO	2	20 February 2009	York Hall, London (United Kingdom)

== Fight Record ==
No.	Result	Opponent	Match Result Type	Round End	Date	Location
4	Won	Jamie Wilson	PTS	6	29 Nov 2002	Myton Suite, Hull (United Kingdom)
5	Won	Martin Thompson	TKO	3	9 March 2003	Tara Leisure Centre, Shaw (United Kingdom)
6	Won	Jamie Hearn	TKO	3	18 March 2003	Rivermead Leisure Centre, Reading (United Kingdom)
7	Loss	Danny Grainger	TKO	2	8 June 2003	Tara Leisure Centre, Shaw (United Kingdom)
8	Won	Paul Wesley	PTS	6	19 October 2003	Tara Leisure Centre, Shaw (United Kingdom)
9	Won	Patrick Cito	PTS	6	29 February 2004	Tara Leisure Centre, Shaw (United Kingdom)
10	Loss	Alan Page	PTS	4	10 April 2004	M.E.N. Arena, Manchester (United Kingdom)
11	Won	Paul Owen	PTS	6	20 April 2004	Octagon Centre, Sheffield (United Kingdom)
12	Won	Nick Okoth	PTS	6	31 October 2004	Tara Leisure Centre, Shaw (United Kingdom)
13	Won	Paul Bonson	PTS	6	20 November 2005	Tara Leisure Centre, Shaw (United Kingdom)
14	Won	Howard Clarke	PTS	6	2 April 2006	Tara Leisure Centre, Shaw (United Kingdom)
15	Loss	Amer Khan	PTS	10	18 June 2006	George Carnall Leisure Centre, Davyhulme, Manchester (United Kingdom)
16	Won	Hastings Rasani	TKO	5	11 March 2007	Tara Leisure Centre, Shaw (United Kingdom)
17	Won	Jon Ibbotson	TKO	4	3 May 2007	Don Valley Stadium, Sheffield (United Kingdom)
18	Won	Hastings Rasani	PTS	6	7 October 2007	Tara Leisure Centre, Shaw (United Kingdom)
19	Won	Simeon Cover	PTS	6	2 December 2007	Tara Leisure Centre, Shaw (United Kingdom)
20	Won	Simeon Cover	RTD	7	20 April 2008	Tara Leisure Centre, Shaw (United Kingdom)
21	Won	Mark Nilsen	PTS	10	16 November 2008	Tara Leisure Centre, Shaw (United Kingdom)
22	Won	Steve Spartacus	KO	2	20 February 2009	York Hall, London (United Kingdom)
23	Won	Carl Dilks	SD	3	20 February 2009	York Hall, London (United Kingdom)
24	Loss	Tony Oakey	UD	3	20 February 2009	York Hall, London (United Kingdom)
25	Won	Carl Wild	PTS	10	24 May 2009	Tara Leisure Centre, Shaw (United Kingdom)
26	Won	Hastings Rasani	PTS	10	28 March 2010	Tara Leisure Centre, Shaw (United Kingdom)
27	Loss	Bob Ajisafe	TKO	3	16 July 2011	Sports Centre, Lord Street, Oldham (United Kingdom)
28	Loss	Tony Dodson	RTD	7	8 October 2011	Greenbank Sports Academy, Liverpool (United Kingdom)

== After boxing ==
Following his retirement, Stubbs set up a community boxing gym in his hometown of Oldham, sending a number of fighters to amateur championships.
