= Yassine El Maachi =

British boxer

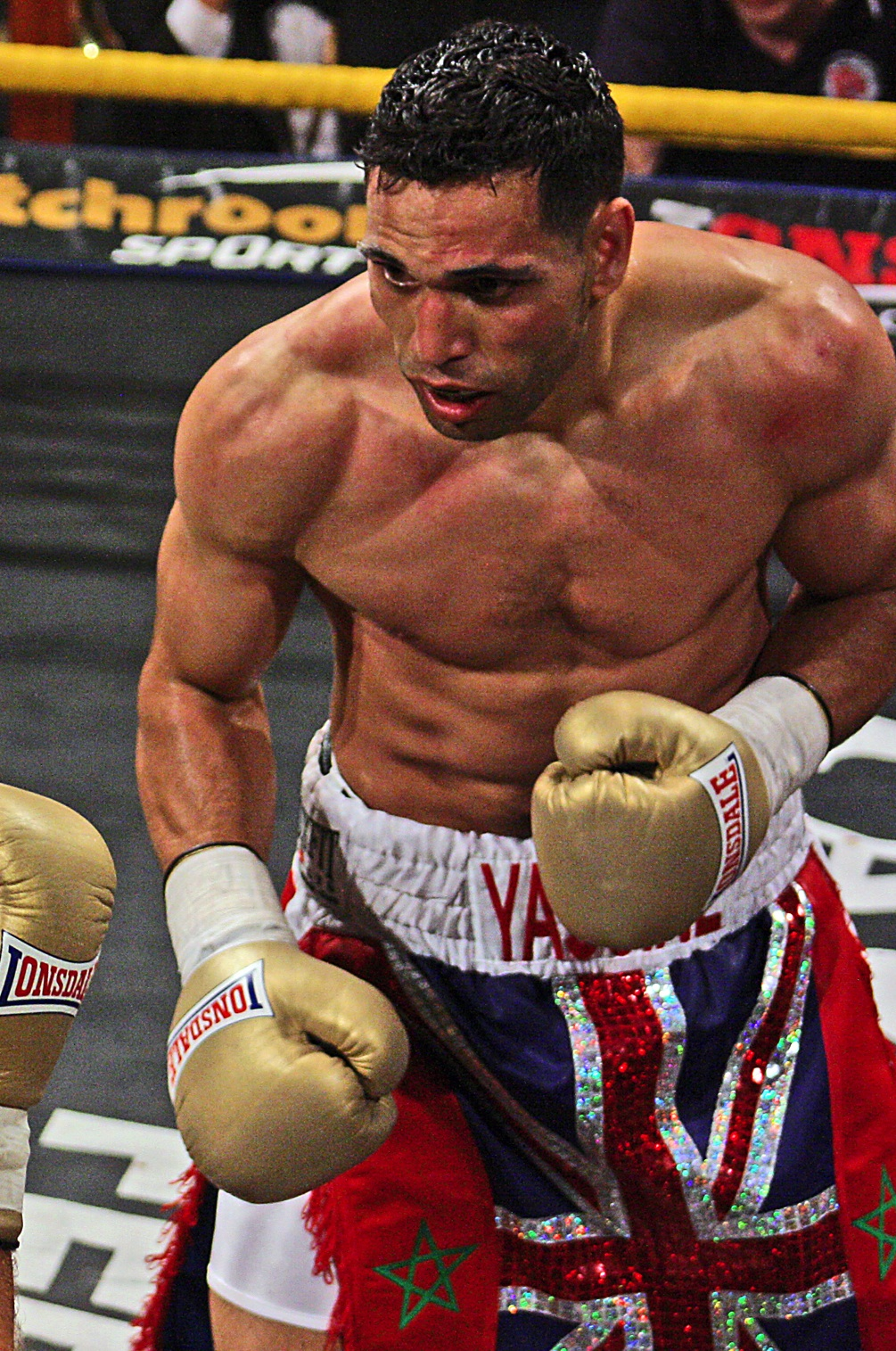

Personal information
- Nickname: The Showman
- Nationality: Moroccan, British
- Born: 19 September 1979 (age 46) Rabat (Morocco)
- Height: 1.72 m (5 ft 8 in)
- Weight: Light-middleweight

Boxing career
- Stance: Southpaw stance

Boxing record
- Total fights: 21
- Wins: 17
- Win by KO: 0
- Losses: 4

Yassine El Maachi (born 19 September 1979, Rabat, Morocco ), also known as "The Showman", is Moroccan-British professional boxer. He is the former International Master champion. He won the Prizefighter series Welterweight in June 2011. After his victory, he became the first boxer ever to beat two world champions on the same night, whom are Colin Lynes and Junior Witter. He is also known by his flashy slick style, which made him the most avoided boxer in Great Britain. He is fluent in four languages: Arabic, Dutch, English and Italian. He became British citizen in 2012

== Biography ==
=== Early life ===
Yassine El Maachi grew up in Rabat, Morocco. He is the youngest kid of a 10 members family. He began boxing at the age of six, thanks to his older brother El Ouafi who was an amateur boxer.

=== Amateur career ===
Shortly after getting involved in boxing, he started his amateur career and won several titles, including two Moroccan Boxing Amateur titles (1997 and 1999) and the National Full Contact title in 1998. He was in store for representing Morocco at the 2000 Summer Olympics in Sydney, but he was dropped out from the list due to an internal issue between his own club FUS de Rabat and the Moroccan Boxing Federation.

=== Professional career ===
Yassine El Maachi finished his amateur career on a successful record (31-0-0) He turned pro by the end of 2000 and made his professional debut one year later in The Hague, Netherlands. His flashy entertaining style pushed plenty of Dutch and European boxers to avoid him. Due to the lack of support he was obliged to give up at an early age but returned to business once he left Netherlands for Great Britain. In 2007, after meeting his current trainer Don Charles, he made a successful comeback winning 10 consecutive fights, including a win over Bertrand Aloa, when he became in 2010, the International Master Champion. He defended later his title against French champion and Europe N.4 Jimmy Collas.

El Maachi won on 7 June 2011, at York Hall, Bethnal Green the Prizefighter series welterweight, after 3 consecutive victories over Peter McDonagh, former British champion and IBO world champion Colin Lynes, and former British champion and World Boxing Council (WBC) world champion Junior Witter. After winning the Prizefighter, he became the first boxer ever to beat two world champions on the same night.

=== Injury ===
Shortly after winning the Prizefighter, El Maachi sustained a complicated knee injury that made him not able to compete. He underwent 7 surgeries between September 2011 and March 2013. He was allowed by his medical staff to restart training in May 2013 to prepare his comeback.
