= Travis Dickinson =

English boxer

Personal information
- Nickname: Tasty
- Nationality: (United Kingdom) British
- Born: Travis Dickinson; 19 March 1988 (age 38) Durham
- Height: 6’4
- Weight: light heavyweight

Boxing career
- Stance: Orthodox

Boxing record
- Total fights: 19
- Wins: 17
- Win by KO: 7
- Losses: 2
- Draws: 0

Travis Dickinson (born 19 March 1988) is an English boxer who fights in the light heavyweight division. He is from Edmondsley in County Durham.

Travis was English Light-Heavyweight champion and also won the light-heavyweight version of the Prizefighter title on 29 January 2011 with victories over Llewellyn Davies, Justin Jones and Sam Couzens at the Olympia in London. Dickinson followed the footsteps of his brother Jon-Lewis Dickinson who was British Cruiserweight champion and had also previously won the Cruiserweight version of the Prizefighter tournament. These are the only pair of brothers ever to win Prizefighter.

Dickinson made his boxing debut on 6 May 2009 beating Patrick Mendy over four rounds at the Robin Park Arena in Wigan and is unbeaten. He beat Matty Clarkson in The maxi-Nutrition tournament, winning him the English Light-Heavyweight title, stopping him in an unbelievable fight. This bout was nominated for The fight of the year and was an eliminator for the British Light-Heavyweight title.

== Bare-knuckle boxing ==
Dickinson was scheduled to make his Bare Knuckle Fighting Championship debut against Kevin Masirika on 8 February 2025 at BKFC Fight Night 20. The opponent was changed to Rowan Gregory for unknown reasons. He won the fight by technical knockout at the end of the second round.

== Bare-knuckle record ==
Professional record breakdown
1 match	0 wins	1 loss
By knockout	0	1

Res.	Record	Opponent	Method	Event	Date	Round	Time	Location	Notes
Win	1–0	Rowan Gregory	TKO	BKFC Fight Night Newcastle: Thompson vs. Boardman	8 February 2025	2	2:00	Newcastle upon Tyne, England	
