= Tony Oakey =

British boxer (born 1976)

Personal information
- Nickname: Oakey Kokey
- Nationality: British
- Born: 2 January 1976 (age 50) Portsmouth, England
- Height: 5 ft 8 in (173 cm)
- Weight: Light heavyweight

Boxing career
- Reach: 69 in (175 cm)
- Stance: Orthodox

Boxing record
- Total fights: 36
- Wins: 29
- Win by KO: 8
- Losses: 6
- Draws: 1

Tony Oakey (born 2 January 1976) is a former British professional boxer who competed from 1998 to 2010. He held the Commonwealth light heavyweight title in 2001 and the British light heavyweight title from 2007 to 2008.

On Friday 20 February 2009 Tony won the Prizefighter Contest winning £25,000 after scoring wins over Billy Boyle, Courtney Fry and Darren Stubbs.

== Professional boxing record ==
36 fights	29 wins	6 losses
By knockout	8	2
By decision	21	4
Draws	1	

No.	Result	Record	Opponent	Type	Round, time	Date	Location	Notes
36	Loss	29–6–1	(Poland) Michal Banbula	PTS	10	21 May 2010	(United Kingdom) Mountbatten Centre, Portsmouth, England	
35	Loss	29–5–1	(United Kingdom) Danny McIntosh	KO	2 (10)	19 Feb 2010	(United Kingdom) Fenton Manor Sports Complex, Stoke-on-Trent, England	For English light heavyweight title
34	Win	29–4–1	(United Kingdom) Shon Davies	TKO	4 (10)	27 Jun 2009	(United Kingdom) Mountbatten Centre, Portsmouth, England	
33	Win	28–4–1	(United Kingdom) Darren Stubbs	UD	3	20 Feb 2009	(United Kingdom) York Hall, London, England	Prizefighter: The Light Heavyweights - Final
32	Win	27–4–1	(United Kingdom) Courtney Fry	UD	3	20 Feb 2009	(United Kingdom) York Hall, London, England	Prizefighter: The Light Heavyweights - Semi-final
31	Win	26–4–1	(United Kingdom) Billy Boyle	UD	3	20 Feb 2009	(United Kingdom) York Hall, London, England	Prizefighter: The Light Heavyweights - Quarter-final
30	Loss	25–4–1	(Wales) Nathan Cleverly	UD	12	10 Oct 2008	(United Kingdom) Everton Park Sports Centre, Liverpool, England	For vacant Commonwealth light heavyweight title
29	Loss	25–3–1	(United Kingdom) Dean Francis	TKO	9 (12)	13 Jun 2008	(United Kingdom) Mountbatten Center, Portsmouth, England	Lost British light heavyweight title; For Commonwealth light heavyweight title
28	Win	25–2–1	(United Kingdom) Peter Haymer	KO	9 (12)	1 Feb 2008	(United Kingdom) York Hall, London, England	Retained British light heavyweight title
27	Draw	24–2–1	(Republic of Ireland) Brian Magee	MD	12	28 Aug 2007	(Republic of Ireland) The Point, Dublin, Ireland	Retained British light heavyweight title
26	Win	24–2	(United Kingdom) Steven Spartacus	TKO	12 (12)	18 May 2007	(United Kingdom) ExCeL Arena, London, England	Won vacant British light heavyweight title
25	Win	23–2	(United Kingdom) Josip Jalusic	PTS	6	7 Mar 2007	(United Kingdom) Goresbrook Leisure Centre, Dagenham, England	
24	Win	22–2	(United Kingdom) Simeon Cover	PTS	6	28 Oct 2006	(United Kingdom) York Hall, London, England	
23	Win	20–2	(Wales) Nathan King	PTS	6	13 May 2006	(United Kingdom) York Hall, London, England	
22	Win	20–2	(Czech Republic) Radek Seman	PTS	8	1 Apr 2006	(United Kingdom) York Hall, London, England	
21	Loss	19–2	(United Kingdom) Peter Haymer	PTS	10	15 Jun 2005	(United Kingdom) York Hall, London, England	For English light heavyweight title
20	Win	19–1	(United Kingdom) Varujan Davtyan	RTD	5 (8)	12 Feb 2005	(United Kingdom) Mountbatten Centre, Portsmouth, England	
19	Loss	18–1	(United Kingdom) Matthew Barney	SD	12	11 Oct 2003	(United Kingdom) Mountbatten Centre, Portsmouth, England	Lost WBU light heavyweight title
18	Win	18–0	(United Kingdom) Neil Linford	UD	12	29 Mar 2003	(United Kingdom) Mountbatten Centre, Portsmouth, England	Retained WBU light heavyweight title
17	Win	17–0	(Estonia) Andrej Karsten	UD	12	12 Oct 2002	(United Kingdom) York Hall, London, England	Retained WBU light heavyweight title
16	Win	16–0	(United Kingdom) Neil Simpson	UD	12	25 May 2002	(United Kingdom) Mountbatten Centre, Portsmouth, England	Retained WBU light heavyweight title
15	Win	15–0	(Ukraine) Kostyantyn Shvets	UD	12	2 Mar 2002	(United Kingdom) York Hall, London, England	Won vacant WBU light heavyweight title
14	Win	14–0	(United Kingdom) Chris Davies	PTS	12	20 Oct 2001	(United Kingdom) Mountbatten Centre, Portsmouth, England	Retained Commonwealth light heavyweight title
13	Win	13–0	(Ukraine) Kostiantyn Okhrei	TKO	4 (6)	9 Sep 2001	(United Kingdom) Elephant & Castle Centre, London, England	
12	Win	12–0	(United Kingdom) Hastings Rasani	TKO	10 (12)	8 May 2001	(United Kingdom) Metrodome Leisure Complex, Barnsley, England	Won vacant Commonwealth light heavyweight title
11	Win	11–0	(United Kingdom) Butch Lesley	PTS	10	26 Mar 2001	(United Kingdom) Conference Centre, London, England	Won British Southern Area light heavyweight title
10	Win	10–0	(Wales) Nathan King	PTS	6	22 Jan 2001	(United Kingdom) York Hall, London, England	
9	Win	9–0	(United Kingdom) Darren Ashton	PTS	4	21 Oct 2000	(United Kingdom) Conference Centre, London, England	
8	Win	8–0	(United Kingdom) Martin Jolley	PTS	6	13 Mar 2000	(United Kingdom) York Hall, London, England	
7	Win	7–0	(United Kingdom) Darren Ashton	PTS	4	21 Feb 2000	(United Kingdom) Elephant & Castle Centre, London, England	
6	Win	6–0	(United Kingdom) Michael Pinnock	PTS	4	1 Oct 1999	(United Kingdom) York Hall, London, England	
5	Win	5–0	(United Kingdom) Jimmy Steel	PTS	4	10 Jul 1999	(United Kingdom) Elephant & Castle Centre, London, England	
4	Win	4–0	(United Kingdom) Mark Lee	PTS	4	6 Mar 1999	(United Kingdom) Elephant & Castle Centre, London, England	
3	Win	3–0	(United Kingdom) Jimmy Steel	PTS	4	16 Jan 1999	(United Kingdom) York Hall, London, England	
2	Win	2–0	(United Kingdom) Zak Chelli	TKO	1 (4)	21 Nov 1998	(United Kingdom) Elephant & Castle Centre, London, England	
1	Win	1–0	(United Kingdom) Smokey Enison	TKO	2 (4)	12 Sep 1998	(United Kingdom) York Hall, London, England	
