= Robert Norton (boxer) =

British former professional boxer (born 1972)

Rob Norton
Personal information
- Nationality: British
- Born: Robert Norton; 20 January 1972 (age 54) Dudley, England
- Height: 6 ft 2 in (188 cm)
- Weight: Cruiserweight

Boxing career
- Stance: Southpaw

Boxing record
- Total fights: 39
- Wins: 32
- Win by KO: 19
- Losses: 5
- Draws: 2

Robert Norton (born 20 January 1972) is a British former professional boxer who competed from 1993 to 2011. He held the British and Commonwealth cruiserweight titles between 2008 and 2011. Once beaten by Pat Mallen

== Early career ==
Norton started his professional career in September 1993, with a 2nd round win over Stuart Fleet in Walsall. By April 1997 he had compiled an unbeaten record of 17 wins against no defeats and only one draw (against Chris Woollas) and had earned a shot at the Commonwealth cruiserweight title. He travelled to Northern Ireland to challenge holder Darren Corbett in December 1997 and lasted the full 12 rounds in what was to be an unsuccessful attempt. The defeat to Corbett was to be his first as a professional.

== WBU champion ==
Norton bounced back from his first career defeat to register two back to back wins before lining himself up for a shot at the World Boxing Union's version of the cruiserweight title. He challenged the reigning champion South African Jacob Mofokeng and registered a majority decision over 12 rounds to lift his first career title. The reign would not last for long however as a challenge by another South African fighter Sebastiaan Rothmann, in his first defence ended in a new champion and a second career defeat for the man from the Midlands after the fight was stopped in the 8th round.

== British and Commonwealth title challenger ==
In response to losing the title Norton took a year out and returned in September 2000 with a win over journeyman Tony Booth. Three more victories followed against Darron Griffiths, Lee Swaby and Paul Bonson before lining himself up for a second tilt at the commonwealth cruiserweight title against current champion Mark Hobson. Also up for grabs during the fight in September 2003 was the vacant British title. However, when Norton tried to challenge at championship level he came up short and Hobson won the fight with a unanimous decision over the full 12 rounds.

== Route back to contention ==
Following the Hobson defeat, Norton returned to the ring in April 2004 with a win over journeyman Greg Scott-Briggs. A victory over former opponent Chris Woollas followed before in December 2004 he met experienced Paul Bonson for the second time in a challenge for the British Masters cruiserweight title. Norton claimed his second career title after stopping Bonson in the 6th round.

One fight only in 2005 and one fight in 2006 saw two further victories against journeyman opponents before in March 2007 Norton challenged Tommy Eastwood for the vacant English cruiserweight crown at the Mercia Park Leisure Centre in Coventry. The fight was won when the referee stopped the contest in the 8th round handing victory and a third career title to Norton

== British and Commonwealth champion ==
Norton's next fight after being declared English champion was in December 2007 when he travelled to Switzerland to fight Serbian Enad Licina. The fight resulted in a fourth career defeat for the Englishman as he lost a unanimous decision over eight rounds. It wasn't until October 2008 that Norton fought again, this time in a challenge for the vacant British cruiserweight title previously held by recently retired Mark Hobson. The fight took place in the Meadowside Leisure Centre in Burton-on-Trent and saw Norton claim the title at the second attempt against London's Micky Steeds.

In February 2009, Norton defended the belt for the first time against David Dolan. The fight at the Aston Leisure Centre in Birmingham was also for the now vacant commonwealth title belt. In an exciting fight which saw a total of five knockdowns, Norton became a two belt champion as he earned the judges votes via a unanimous decision. On 13 November 2009 Norton defeated former European title challenger Ismail Abdoul in a non-title fight before meeting Dolan again on 15 January 2010 at the leisure centre in Altrincham. In another close fight, Norton once again managed to hold on to the title when the judges scored the contest a draw.

Norton chose to give up his Commonwealth title when it was felt he would not be able to meet his mandatory challenge against Australian Dominic Vea. The fight, due to take place on Vea's home turf in Australia, did not appeal to Norton who said “Does anybody want to go 12,000 miles to fight? Especially when I was the man with the title and they should have come here to face me." Norton chose instead to concentrate on his British title saying that the most important thing for him was to "win the lonsdale belt outright".

After 21 months of inactivity, Norton defended his British title against Leon Williams in October 2011. Williams took a highly controversial split decision. This was Norton's final fight.

Preceded by Mark Hobson; Retired	British Cruiserweight Champion; 3 October 2008 – 21 October 2011	Succeeded by Leon Williams
Preceded by Troy Ross vacated	Commonwealth Cruiserweight Champion; 6 February 2009 – 2010	Succeeded by vacated Dominic Vea
Preceded by Jacob Mofokeng	WBU Cruiserweight Champion; 1 April 1999 – 24 September 1999	Succeeded by Sebastiaan Rothmann
