= Darren Morgan (boxer) =

British boxer (born 1976)

Personal information
- Nickname: The Beast from Bonymaen
- Born: 26 October 1976 (age 50) Swansea, Wales
- Height: 6 ft 1 1/2 in (187 cm)
- Weight: Heavyweight

Boxing career
- Stance: Orthodox

Boxing record
- Total fights: 13
- Wins: 8
- Win by KO: 6
- Losses: 5
Medal record
Men's amateur boxing
Representing Wales
Four Nations Championships
Gold medal – first place	2004 Glasgow	Super-heavyweight
Welsh National Championships
Gold medal – first place	2004 Ebbw Vale	Super-heavyweight

Darren Morgan (born 26 October 1976) is a British former professional boxer who competed between 2005 and 2014. As an amateur, he won the WABA super-heavyweight title and a gold medal at the Four Nations Championship in 2004.

== Amateur career ==
Morgan competed in the 2003 European Union Amateur Championships, losing on points to eventual bronze medalist, Ahmet Aksu, in the quarterfinals. Later that year, Morgan competed in an international dual match between Wales and Norway, winning by stoppage.

Morgan won the 2004 WABA super heavyweight title, after defeating David Maes in the final. Morgan competed in the 2004 European Amateur Championships, losing by stoppage, in the preliminaries. Morgan won a gold medal at the Four Nations Championships. Morgan competed in the Chowdhry Cup, which served as an olympic qualifier, losing on points, in the preliminaries. Morgan competed in the 2004 European Union Amateur Championships, losing by stoppage to eventual bronze medalist, Sergey Rozhnov, in the quarterfinals.

== Professional career ==
=== Early career ===
Morgan turned professional under Frank Warren's Queensberry Promotions banner. Morgan made his professional debut on 21 January 2005 at the Bridgend Leisure Centre in Bridgend, beating Gambian Ebrima Secka by a technical knockout (TKO) in the first round. Morgan's second fight was against English heavyweight Dave Clarke at the MEN Arena in Manchester on 4 June 2005, on the undercard of Ricky Hatton's successful IBF and The Ring junior welterweight title challenge against Kostya Tszyu, winning via first-round TKO. Morgan's third fight was at the International Arena in Cardiff against Englishman Tony Booth (45–48–8, 9 KOs) on 10 September 2005, winning a points decision (PTS), by 39–35.

In February 2006, Morgan scored a third-round TKO victory over Radcliffe Green at the ExCeL, to take his record to 4–0. In March that year, Morgan defeated István Kecskés, winning on points after four rounds.

=== Consecutive defeats ===
In May 2006, Morgan came up against the toughest test of his career in undefeated Irish heavyweight prospect, Martin Rogan (3–0, 2 KOs) in Belfast, losing a points decision.

Morgan's next fight was at the York Hall in London against undefeated heavyweight Derek Chisora (2–0, 1 KO) on 13 October 2007, losing on points after four rounds. Chisora stated in 2022 that Morgan was the hardest puncher he has ever faced in his career.

In January 2008, in his first fight over six rounds, Morgan faced undefeated heavyweight Sam Sexton (6–0, 2 KOs) in London, losing by PTS.

=== Prizefighters ===
On 11 April 2008, Morgan was a competitor in the inaugural Prizefighter series on Sky Sports. Morgan faced David Dolan in the quarter-final, losing by unanimous decision with scores of 30–26, 30–27, and 30–27. A punishing left hook from Morgan had Dolan out on his feet and holding on in the final round.

On 12 September 2008, Morgan once again competed in the second Prizefighter series on Sky Sports. Morgan faced Lee Swaby in the quarter-final, losing by unanimous decision with scores of 30–27, 30–27, and 30–27.

=== Return to the ring ===
Morgan made his ring return on 14 September 2013 at the Oceana in Swansea. He fought Egyptian Adel Badawy, winning via TKO at 26 seconds in the first round. Morgan followed this victory up with another first-round stoppage win against Lithuanian Remigijus Ziausys two months later.

On 24 October 2014, Morgan defeated Mateusz Gatek, scoring a TKO victory at 10 seconds in the opening round, achieving his third knockout (KO) victory in a row.

== Personal life ==
Morgan, also known by his ring name “Daz”, hails from Ystradgynlais and has been candid about a traumatic past that has deeply influenced both his life and boxing career. In a decision that broke a long-held silence, Morgan disclosed that he and a close friend were subjected to prolonged sexual abuse beginning when they were just six years old. The perpetrator, a family friend who was later adjudicated for his actions, abused their trust over several decades. Morgan’s choice to waive his legal entitlement to anonymity was driven by a desire to empower other victims and to bring broader attention to the issue of child sexual abuse.

Morgan has attributed many of his early adult struggles—notably bouts of uncontrolled aggression—to the unresolved impact of those experiences. This inner turmoil was, in part, channeled into his boxing, where he gained recognition on the amateur and semi-professional circuits under the moniker “Bonymaen Beast.” Despite his commitment to the sport, the lingering emotional burden ultimately played a role in his decision to retire from boxing, as he felt that the personal scars prevented him from realizing his full potential.

In addition to his experiences of abuse, Morgan has faced significant personal loss, having lost his father and older brother within a few months of each other. These compounded hardships have informed his public disclosures and advocacy, as he seeks not only to reconcile with a painful past but also to foster dialogue on issues of victim support and early intervention. His revelation, coming after the conviction of his alleged abuser on multiple charges related to indecent assault, has resonated with those who remain hesitant to speak out about sexual abuse.

== Professional boxing record ==
13 fights	8 wins	5 losses
By knockout	6	0
By decision	2	5

No.	Result	Record	Opponent	Type	Round, time	Date	Location	Notes
13	Win	8–5	Mateusz Gatek	TKO	1 (4), 0:10	24 Oct 2014	Leisure Centre, Merthyr Tydfil, Wales	
12	Win	7–5	Remigijus Ziausys	TKO	1 (4), 1:04	29 Nov 2013	Oceana, Swansea, Wales	
11	Win	6–5	Adel Badawy	TKO	1 (6), 0:26	14 Sep 2013	Oceana, Swansea, Wales	
10	Loss	5–5	Lee Swaby	UD	3	12 Sep 2008	Metro Radio Arena, Newcastle, England	Prizefighter Series: heavyweight - quarter final
9	Loss	5–4	David Dolan	UD	3	11 Apr 2008	York Hall, London, England	Prizefighter Series: heavyweight - quarter final
8	Loss	5–3	Sam Sexton	PTS	6	12 Jan 2008	York Hall, London, England	
7	Loss	5–2	Derek Chisora	PTS	4	13 Oct 2007	York Hall, London, England	
6	Loss	5–1	Martin Rogan	PTS	4	20 May 2006	King's Hall, Belfast, Northern Ireland	
5	Win	5–0	István Kecskés	PTS	4	11 Mar 2006	Newport Centre, Newport, Wales	
4	Win	4–0	Radcliffe Green	TKO	3 (4), 1:37	25 Feb 2006	ExCeL, London, England	
3	Win	3–0	Tony Booth	PTS	4	10 Sep 2005	International Arena, Cardiff, Wales	
2	Win	2–0	Dave Clarke	TKO	1 (4), 1:34	4 Jun 2005	MEN Arena, Manchester, England	
1	Win	1–0	Ebrima Secka	TKO	1 (4), 2:11	21 Jan 2005	Leisure Centre, Bridgend, Wales	

== Mixed martial arts record ==
Professional record breakdown
1 match	0 wins	1 loss
By submission	0	1

Res.	Record	Opponent	Method	Event	Date	Round	Time	Location	Notes
Loss	0–1	Ashley Pollard	Submission (Calf Slicer)	PFN - Predator Fight Night	9 November 2008	1	0:59	Swansea, Wales	

Sporting positions
Amateur boxing titles
Previous: Kevin Evans	WABA super-heavyweight champion 2004	Next: Allan Kasongo
Previous: Kevin Evans	Four Nations super-heavyweight champion 2004	Next: David Price
