= Dave Ferguson (boxer) =

English boxer

Personal information
- Born: David Mark Ferguson; 28 February 1976 (age 50) North Shields, England
- Height: 6 ft 4 in (1.93 m)
- Weight: Heavyweight

Boxing career
- Stance: Orthodox

Boxing record
- Total fights: 8
- Wins: 7
- Win by KO: 2
- Losses: 1
- Draws: 0
- No contests: 0

David Mark Ferguson (born 28 February 1976) is a British former professional boxer who competed from 2007 to 2010.

== Professional career ==
Ferguson competed in the "Prizefighter" competition at York Hall, Bethnal Green. He beat Billy Bessey in the opening round, before losing to Martin Rogan, the eventual winner, in the semi-final.

He also competed in the second "Prizefighter" competition in Newcastle upon Tyne on 12 September 2008. He went out on a split decision to Luke Simpkin in the opening round.
