= Luke Simpkin =

British boxer (born 1979)

Personal information
- Born: Luke Simpkin; 5 May 1979 (age 47) Derby, England
- Height: 6 ft 2 in (1.88 m)
- Weight: Heavyweight

Boxing career
- Stance: Orthodox

Boxing record
- Total fights: 46
- Wins: 11
- Win by KO: 8
- Losses: 32
- Draws: 3
- No contests: 0

Luke Simpkin (born 5 May 1979 in Derby) is a British former professional boxer who competed from 1998 to 2008.

== Professional career ==
Simpkin competed in the "Prizefighter" competition in Newcastle upon Tyne on 12 September 2008. Defeating Dave Ferguson in the opening round, Simpkin went on to fight Sam Sexton. Sexton subsequently took Simpkin out of contention winning the match by unanimous decision and continued on to win the competition.
