= Ryan Brawley =

Scottish boxer

Personal information
- Nationality: British
- Born: Ryan Brawley; 2 February 1986 (age 40) Irvine, Scotland
- Weight: Lightweight

Boxing career
- Stance: Southpaw

Boxing record
- Total fights: 19
- Wins: 18
- Win by KO: 1
- Losses: 1
- Draws: 0

Ryan Brawley (born 2 February 1986) is a Scottish professional boxer fighting in the lightweight division. He was the winner of the sixth Prizefighter tournament featuring boxers in the lightweight category.

As an amateur Brawley fought for Springside amateur boxing club under the guidance of John Mullen. He won 50 out of 58 fights and won 5 Scottish titles 2 British titles and won the 4 nations. Brawley represented Scotland in the 2003 junior European championships one of only two representatives from Scotland, David Ellis being the other. Both boxers lost in their opening bouts.

== Professional career ==
Brawley's professional debut came on 19 September 2005 with a victory over Peter Buckley at the St. Andrews sporting Club in Glasgow. He fought once more that year to finish 2005 with a record of 2-0. Brawley boxed seven more times over the next three years, winning on each occasion. Victories which included wins over the then unbeaten Hungarian Zsolt Jonas in May 2007 and former British champion and Commonwealth title challenger Jamie McKeever in June 2008.

=== Prizefighter win ===
On 24 March 2009 and with an unbeaten record of 9-0 Brawley took part in the sixth installment of the Prizefighter series franchise televised live on Sky Sports. The tournament was the first to include boxers from the lightweight category and took place at the Kelvin Hall in Glasgow, the first time the tournament had been held in Scotland. Brawley went on to win the tournament and claim the first prize of £25,000 with wins over Ben Murphy in the quarter finals, Paul Holborn in the semi's and the then unbeaten Stephen Burke in the final.

Since the Prizefighter win, Brawley boxed twice more in 2009 defeating Daniel Thorpe in June, and Jason Nesbitt in October. His first fight of 2010 saw him defeat Arek Malek in January over 8 rounds in Glasgow followed by a trip to Huddersfield in March and a win over French fighter Sebastien Cornu.

=== Scottish title challenge ===
On 24 January 2011 Brawley challenged Stuart Green for the Scottish Area light-welterweight title at the Radisson Hotel in Glasgow, losing for the first time 96-95 over ten rounds. Speaking of his first defeat Brawley said "You don’t enjoy a fight when you get beaten – especially when you’ve only got yourself to blame". He added "I let myself get suckered into fighting on Green’s terms and ended up in a battle when I should just have concentrated on my boxing abilities".
