= Luke Keeler =

Irish boxer

Personal information
- Born: 27 April 1987 (age 39) Dublin, Ireland
- Height: 5 ft 11 1/2 in (182 cm)
- Weight: Middleweight

Boxing career
- Stance: Orthodox

Boxing record
- Total fights: 21
- Wins: 17
- Win by KO: 5
- Losses: 3
- Draws: 1

Luke Keeler (born 27 April 1987) is an Irish professional boxer who challenged for the WBO middleweight title in 2020. He participated in the 35th and final edition of the Prizefighter series in 2015, losing in the semi-final.

== Professional career ==
Keeler made his professional debut on 3 May 2013, scoring a first-round stoppage victory against Mihaly Voros at the Carlton Hotel in Dublin, Ireland.

After his win over Luis Arias, Keeler stated he wanted to fight the best the division had to offer.

In August 2018, Keeler said he got a phone call from Conor McGregor and said McGregor yelled at him and challenged him to a boxing match. “There was just talk over a phone, a shouting match. Far fetched, I know, but his bout with Mayweather would’ve been further fetched so you never know.”

== Professional boxing record ==
| 23 fights | 19 wins | 3 losses |
|---|---|---|
| By knockout | 7 | 2 |
| By decision | 12 | 1 |
| Draws | 1 | |

| No. | Result | Record | Opponent | Type | Round, time | Date | Location | Notes |
|---|---|---|---|---|---|---|---|---|
| 23 | Win | 19–3–1 | Godfey Paulo Kamata | TKO | 6 (8), 2:06 | 16 Mar 2024 | Salthill Leisureland Complex, Galway, Ireland | |
| 22 | Win | 18–3–1 | Jiri Kroupa | TKO | 4 (4), 0:35 | 3 Nov 2023 | Warehouse at The Red Cow, Dublin, Ireland | |
| 21 | Loss | 17–3–1 | Demetrius Andrade | TKO | 9 (12), 2:59 | 30 Jan 2020 | Meridian at Island Gardens, Miami, Florida, US | For WBO middleweight title |
| 20 | Win | 17–2–1 | Luís Arias | PTS | 10 | 3 Aug 2019 | Falls Park, Belfast, Northern Ireland | |
| 19 | Win | 16–2–1 | Conrad Cummings | UD | 10 | 29 Mar 2019 | Ulster Hall, Belfast, Northern Ireland | Retained WBO European middleweight title |
| 18 | Win | 15–2–1 | Dwain Grant | PTS | 8 | 18 Aug 2018 | Windsor Park, Belfast, Northern Ireland | |
| 17 | Win | 14–2–1 | Conrad Cummings | UD | 10 | 21 Apr 2018 | The SSE Arena, Belfast, Northern Ireland | Won vacant WBO European middleweight title |
| 16 | Draw | 13–2–1 | Adam Jones | PTS | 4 | 10 Feb 2018 | Devenish Complex, Belfast, Northern Ireland | |
| 15 | Win | 13–2 | Darren Cruise | PTS | 10 | 24 Jun 2017 | National Stadium, Dublin, Ireland | Won vacant BUI Ireland National middleweight title |
| 14 | Win | 12–2 | Lewis Taylor | PTS | 8 | 25 Feb 2017 | National Stadium, Dublin, Ireland | |
| 13 | Win | 11–2 | Bradley Pryce | PTS | 8 | 5 Nov 2016 | National Stadium, Dublin, Ireland | Won vacant BUI Celtic middleweight title |
| 12 | Loss | 10–2 | Tom Doran | TKO | 2 (10), 1:37 | 2 Apr 2016 | Echo Arena, Liverpool, England | For vacant WBC International middleweight title |
| 11 | Win | 10–1 | Adam Jones | PTS | 6 | 5 Mar 2016 | Genting Arena, Solihull, England | |
| 10 | Win | 9–1 | Jason Ball | PTS | 6 | 5 Sep 2015 | First Direct Arena, Leeds, England | |
| 9 | Loss | 8–1 | Tom Doran | UD | 3 | 14 Feb 2015 | Winter Gardens, Blackpool, England | Prizefighter: The Middleweights III – Semi-final |
| 8 | Win | 8–0 | Luke Crowcroft | UD | 3 | 14 Feb 2015 | Winter Gardens, Blackpool, England | Prizefighter: The Middleweights III – Quarter-final |
| 7 | Win | 7–0 | Gary Boulden | TKO | 1 (6), 2:17 | 15 Nov 2014 | 3Arena, Dublin, Ireland | |
| 6 | Win | 6–0 | Laszlo Kovacs | PTS | 6 | 12 Sep 2014 | Red Cow Moran Hotel, Dublin, Ireland | |
| 5 | Win | 5–0 | Festim Lama | TKO | 4 (6), 2:57 | 6 Jun 2014 | Holiday Inn, Belfast, Northern Ireland | |
| 4 | Win | 4–0 | Edgars Sniedze | TKO | 2 (6), 2:06 | 15 Feb 2014 | National Stadium, Dublin, Ireland | |
| 3 | Win | 3–0 | Janos Lakatos | TKO | 1 (4), 2:24 | 2 Nov 2013 | Our Lady's Hall, Dublin, Ireland | |
| 2 | Win | 2–0 | Tommy Tolan | PTS | 4 | 12 July 2013 | Fairways Hotel, Dundalk, Ireland | |
| 1 | Win | 1–0 | Mihaly Voros | RTD | 1 (4), 3:00 | 3 May 2013 | Carlton Hotel, Dublin, Ireland | |
