= Shane McPhilbin =

British professional boxer

Personal information
- Born: Nottingham, England
- Height: 6 ft 0 in (1.83 m)
- Weight: Cruiserweight; Heavyweight

Boxing career

Boxing record
- Total fights: 18
- Wins: 8
- Win by KO: 5
- Losses: 9
- Draws: 1

Shane McPhilbin is a British former professional boxer who competed from 2009 to 2014. He held the British cruiserweight title in 2012.

== Career ==
From Bulwell, Nottingham, McPhilbin's professional career started in 2009. In October 2010 he competed in the Prizefighter tournament, losing to Michael Sprott in the heavyweight semi-final. He beat Rhys Davies in June 2011 to take the vacant Midlands-area heavyweight title and in January 2012 challenged Leon Williams for his British cruiserweight title; McPhilbin won with a 12th round stoppage to become British champion. He lost the title in his first defence against Enzo Maccarinelli two months later on points, despite putting Maccarinelli down twice. Maccarinelli was ordered to give McPhilbin an immediate rematch due to timekeeping errors, with round 1 ended 47 seconds early after Maccarinelli had been knocked down, but vacated the title after a doping violation and McPhilbin fought for it again in October against Jon-Lewis Dickinson, losing to a unanimous points verdict.

In January 2013, McPhilbin fought Chris Keane for the vacant Midlands-area cruiserweight title, losing in the third round after being knocked down three times. Three defeats (including a loss to Hughie Fury) and a draw followed before he challenged for the vacant Midlands-area heavyweight title, this time against Paul Butlin, losing after being disqualified in the fourth round for hitting on the break.
