= Ian Lewison =

English boxer

Personal information
- Nickname: Lay Em Out
- Born: Ian Jason Lewison; 23 September 1981 (age 45) East Dulwich, London, England
- Height: 6 ft 2 in (188 cm)
- Weight: Heavyweight

Boxing career
- Stance: Orthodox

Boxing record
- Total fights: 17
- Wins: 12
- Win by KO: 8
- Losses: 4
- Draws: 1

Ian Jason Lewison (born 23 September 1981) is a British former professional boxer who competed from 2009 to 2017. He challenged once for the British heavyweight title in 2016.

== Professional career ==
Lewison travelled to Nanning, China to face Zhu Yu Wu on 24 June 2016 for the vacant WBO Asia Pacific heavyweight title, winning by a knockout in the second round. He then went on to fight Dillian Whyte in Glasgow at The SSE Hydro for the vacant BBBofC British heavyweight title on 7 October. Lewison was forced to retire at the end of the 10th round. Having sustained a broken nose he was pulled from the fight by his trainer, Don Charles.

== Professional boxing record ==
17 fights	12 wins	4 losses
By knockout	8	2
By decision	4	2
Draws	1	

No.	Result	Record	Opponent	Type	Round, time	Date	Location	Notes
17	Loss	12–4–1	Joe Joyce	TKO	8 (10), 2:35	20 Oct 2017	indigo at The O2, London, England	
16	Loss	12–3–1	Dillian Whyte	RTD	10 (12), 3:00	7 Oct 2016	The SSE Hydro, Glasgow, Scotland	For vacant British heavyweight title
15	Win	12–2–1	Zhu Yu Wu	KO	2 (10), 2:20	24 Jun 2016	Guangxi Sports Center Gymnasium, Nanning, China	Won vacant WBO Asia Pacific heavyweight title
14	Win	11–2–1	Tomas Mrazek	KO	1 (6)	30 Apr 2014	York Hall, London, England	
13	Win	10–2–1	Hrvoje Kisicek	PTS	4	19 Jul 2014	Camden Centre, London, England	
12	Win	9–2–1	Kreso Bogdanovic	RTD	2 (6), 3:00	9 Jun 2014	Radisson Blu Hotel, Glasgow, Scotland	
11	Win	8–2–1	Tom Dallas	TKO	2 (10), 1:18	7 Sep 2013	York Hall, London, England	Won vacant Southern Area heavyweight title
8	Loss	7–2–1	Derric Rossy	SD	3	23 Feb 2013	York Hall, London, England	Prizefighter: The International Heavyweights III – Semi-final
9	Win	7–1–1	Timo Hoffmann	TKO	1 (3), 2:02	23 Feb 2013	York Hall, London, England	Prizefighter: The International Heavyweights III – Quarter-final
8	Win	6–1–1	Dorian Darch	TKO	4 (6), 1:34	8 Dec 2012	Brentwood Centre, Brentwood, England	
7	Win	5–1–1	Istvan Ruzsinszky	PTS	4	7 Jul 2012	York Hall, London, England	
6	Loss	4–1–1	Colin Kenna	PTS	4	21 Nov 2011	Big Top, London, England	
5	Win	4–0–1	Remigijus Ziausys	PTS	4	1 Jun 2011	Millennium Hotel, London, England	
4	Win	3–0–1	Declan Timlin	TKO	1 (4)	17 Nov 2010	Royal Lancaster Hotel, London, England	
3	Win	2–0–1	Igoris Borucha	KO	1 (4)	20 Jun 2010	York Hall, London, England	
2	Draw	1–0–1	Pavels Dolgovs	PTS	4	18 Nov 2009	Royal Lancaster Hotel, London, England	
1	Win	1–0	Jason Callum	PTS	6	20 Mar 2009	York Hall, London, England	
