= David Dolan (boxer) =

English boxer (born 1979)

Personal information
- Nickname: Dolo
- Nationality: British (English)
- Born: 7 October 1979 (age 46) England, England
- Height: 6 ft 0 in (1.83 m)
- Weight: Heavyweight

Boxing career
- Club: Plains Farm ABC, Sunderland

Boxing record
- Total fights: 22
- Wins: 16
- Win by KO: 5
- Losses: 5
- Draws: 1
- No contests: 0
Medal record
Men's amateur boxing
Commonwealth Games
Representing England
Gold medal – first place	2002 Manchester	Super heavyweight

David Dolan (born 7 October 1979) is a British former professional boxer who competed from 2006 to 2013. At regional level, he challenged twice for the British cruiserweight title in 2009 and 2013, and once for the Commonwealth title in 2009. As an amateur, he won a gold medal at the 2002 Commonwealth Games.

== Boxing career ==
=== Amateur career ===
Dolan was a three-time winner of the prestigious British heavyweight title in 2000, 2001 and 2002.

Dolan represented the 2002 English team at the 2002 Commonwealth Games in Manchester, England, where he competed in the super heavyweight division. He won the gold medal after beating Jerry Butler of the Bahamas, Star Tauasi of Niue and Kevin Evans of Wales before winning the final against David Cadieux of Canada, winning 27-20.

Dolan then dropped down again to 201 lbs where he lost in the second round of the World Championships to hard-punching southpaw Viktar Zuyev, who knocked him down twice. Later in the year he split a pair of fights with American star Matt Godfrey. At the World Championships in 2005, he lost to eventual runner up Elchin Alizade.

=== Early professional career ===
Dolan begun his professional career competing at heavyweight and had his first professional contest in May 2006 scoring a four round points victory over Nabil Haciani. Over the next two years he fought six more times scoring wins over experienced journeymen Paul King, Luke Simpkin, Tony Booth and Lee Swaby.

=== Prizefighter tournament ===
On 11 April 2008, with a record of 7-0, Dolan appeared in the first edition of the Prizefighter series on Sky Sports, beating Darren Morgan on points in the quarter-final. Before defeating Paul Butlin in the semi-final to set up a final showdown with Martin Rogan, which he lost by a unanimous decision after being knocked down two times.

=== Move to Cruiserweight ===
Following the tournament Dolan decided to begin campaigning at the cruiserweight level as he often found himself giving weight away to other heavyweights. In July 2008 he won his first fight at the weight against the Brazilian Elvicio Sobral and then in October 2008 beat the French fighter Rachid El Hadak to set himself up for a shot at the full British cruiserweight title held by Robert Norton.

=== British title challenge ===
On 6 February 2009, Dolan fought Norton for the British title with the vacant commonwealth belt also on the line. The fight took place in the Aston Events Center in Birmingham and saw a total of five knockdowns before ending with a unanimous points victory for the champion handing Dolan only the second defeat of his career.
