= Cello Renda =

English boxer

Personal information
- Nickname: Dangerous
- Nationality: English
- Born: Marcello Renda; 4 June 1985 (age 41) Peterborough, England
- Height: 5 ft 11 in (180 cm)
- Weight: Middleweight; Super-middleweight

Boxing career
- Stance: Orthodox

Boxing record
- Total fights: 44
- Wins: 29
- Win by KO: 13
- Losses: 13
- Draws: 2

Marcello 'Cello' Renda (born 4 June 1985) is an English former professional boxer who competed from 2004 to 2018. He competed in two editions of the middleweight Prizefighter series tournament, reaching the finals in the 4th edition of the series in 2008 as well as the 35th and final edition in 2015.

== Biography ==
Renda was born in Peterborough; he has four brothers and one sister. His favourite boxer is Sugar Ray Leonard and his favourite football team is A.C. Milan.

== Professional career ==
Renda made his professional debut on 30 September 2004, where he defeated the previously unbeaten Mark Ellwood in a second-round technical knockout.

Two months later, Renda was himself knocked out by the debuting Joey Vegas in the third-round of his second fight. In September 2007, Renda defeated Steve Ede to win the British Masters middleweight title.

=== English Title ===
On 8 March 2008, Renda challenged the undefeated Paul Smith, who was a contestant in The Contender 3, for the vacant English middleweight title. Renda was stopped in the sixth round of the ten-round contest.

=== Prizefighter 4: The Middleweights ===
On 22 November 2008, Renda was given the opportunity to fight for the £25,000 winners' prize in the 4th Prizefighter tournament. He defeated Danny Thornton by second-round knockout and Max Maxwell on points on his way to the final. In the final Renda faced tournament favourite Martin Murray who defeated him by a close points decision. In 2009 he was involved in a rare double knockdown against Paul Samuels.

== Championships Held ==
- British Masters Middleweight title

International Master light heavyweight title Southern Area super Middleweight title
