= Rhys Roberts =

English boxer

Personal information
- Nationality: English (England)
- Born: 3 June 1989 (age 37) Manchester, United Kingdom
- Weight: Super-bantamweight

Boxing career
- Stance: Orthodox

Boxing record
- Total fights: 19
- Wins: 16
- Win by KO: 2
- Losses: 2
- Draws: 1

Rhys Roberts is a former super-bantamweight boxer from Manchester, England, who was active between 2007 and 2012. He was signed to Ricky Hatton's Hatton Promotions.

Roberts made his professional debut in 2007, defeating Delroy Spencer on points after six completed rounds. He had 16 victories in his 19 professional fights. These included a victory over Georgian George Gachechiladze for the vacant International Masters featherweight title in 2010. He suffered two losses, the first being against Daniel Kodjo Sassou when he sustained a hand injury in the opening round and was forced to retire on his stool.
