= Ovill McKenzie =

Jamaican boxer

Personal information
- Nickname: The Upsetter
- Nationality: British
- Born: 26 November 1979 (age 46) Kingston, Jamaica
- Height: 6 ft 0 in (183 cm)
- Weight: Light heavyweight; Cruiserweight

Boxing career
- Stance: Orthodox

Boxing record
- Total fights: 38
- Wins: 25
- Win by KO: 13
- Losses: 12
- Draws: 1

Ovill McKenzie (born 26 November 1979) is a Jamaican-British former professional boxer who competed from 2003 to 2015. He challenged once for the IBF cruiserweight title in 2015. At regional level, he held the Commonwealth light heavyweight title twice between 2006 and 2013, and the British and Commonwealth cruiserweight titles from 2014 to 2015.

== Professional career ==
McKenzie's professional career begun on 6 March 2003, with a victory over fellow debutant Leigh Alliss at Ashton Gate the home of Bristol City. He followed this victory up 10 April 2003, with a win over Welshman Nathan King in Wales. However, three straight defeats followed his initial winning start and he registered losses to Pinky Burton, Peter Haymer and Courtney Fry before finishing 2003 with a victory over Edwin Cleary to finish his inaugural year as a pro, with a record of 3-3.

His second year of professional boxing saw another set of mixed results, fighting five times in 2004, he lost on three occasions, albeit to some significant opposition which included the likes of future WBO super middleweight champion Denis Inkin, future WBA light heavyweight champion Stipe Drews and future double English title challenger Tommy Eastwood. One significant result during the year however saw him score a shock upset win over the then undefeated English champion Steven Spartacus in a fight which was only over six rounds and did not have the title on the line.

=== Commonwealth champion ===
Over the course of 2005 and 2006, McKenzie was able to maintain an eight fight winning run culminating in a successful challenge against Peter Haymer for the vacant Commonwealth light heavyweight title on 24 November 2006. The run also saw McKenzie register a win over undefeated Courtney Fry on 13 May 2005, and take the unbeaten record from Hungarian, Gyorgy Hidvegi in the fight before. McKenzie's reign as champion would not last long as he lost the belt on 9 February 2007, in his first defence to Dean Francis after being knocked out in the first round. McKenzie regrouped from the defeat with a win against undefeated Mark Nilsen in his next fight but then lost once more to Tony Salem at the Doncaster Dome on 19 October 2007.

=== Prizefighter win ===
McKenzie returned to action a year and a half later following the loss to Salem only to once again drop a close points decision this time to Bob Ajisafe at the Leigh Indoor Sports Center on 17 April 2009. On 19 May 2009, he moved up a weight to cruiserweight and scored a victory in the seventh installment of the Prizefighter tournament. With only two weeks notice, McKenzie entered the competition after one of the original boxers, Mark Krence was forced to withdraw through injury. He defeated former European champion Terry Dunstan in the first round, former Commonwealth and Irish champion Darren Corbett in the semi-final, and former British champion John Keeton in the final to take the main prize of £25,000.

=== Title fights ===
McKenzie followed up his success on the Prizefighter with a win over Billy Boyle on 5 February 2010 before, on 9 December 2010, earning a challenge for his old Commonwealth light heavyweight title at the Echo Arena in Liverpool. The champion, Tony Bellew had already made one successful defence against common opponent Bob Ajisafe, winning a hard fought fight over 12 rounds. McKenzie managed to put the champion down in both the first and second rounds, before Bellew began to take over in the later rounds with the fight eventually being stopped in the eighth resulting in a 10th career defeat for McKenzie. The two met once again on 16 July 2011 at the same venue with the fight this time lasting the full 12 rounds and with the vacant British title also being on the line with Bellew winning once again although this time via 12 round decision. McKenzie fought for the Commonwealth title once again on 11 November 2011 after Tony Bellew vacated the belt beating Welsh champion Jeff Evans in just 15 seconds. The win, in Halifax, meant that McKenzie lifted the title for the second time in his career to become a two-time champion having won the title for the first time in 2006. On 4 February 2012 he defended the Commonwealth title against former British Champion Tony Dodson with a third round TKO. He again defended the belt against former world champion Enzo Maccarinelli with a second round TKO 9 November 2012, ultimately losing the title to Maccarinelli in a rematch by 11th round TKO on 17 August 2013.
