= Michael Lomax (boxer) =

British boxer (born 1978)

Personal information
- Nickname: The Look
- Nationality: British
- Born: Michael Lomax; 25 September 1978 (age 47) United Kingdom
- Height: 6 ft 0 in (1.83 m)
- Weight: Welterweight

Boxing career
- Stance: Southpaw

Boxing record
- Total fights: 30
- Wins: 22
- Win by KO: 2
- Losses: 7
- Draws: 1

Michael Lomax (born 25 September 1978) is a British Welterweight boxer. Nicknamed "The Look", Lomax is a former ABA champion and was the winner of Prizefighter 3: The Welterweights

== Early career ==
In July 2005, at the age of 25, Lomax began his professional boxing career with a decision victory over journeyman Ernie Smith. Lomax boxed his way to a 10–0 record before a points draw with Silence Saheed ended his winning run in March 2007. On 6 July 2007, Lomax was outclassed on his way to a points defeat to Craig Watson.

== Prizefighter ==
During the Prizefighter tournament held on 23 October 2008, Lomax suffered two cuts in his first bout with Craig Dickson. He received two stitches to a cut in his forehead before going on to defeat former British light-welterweight champion Nigel Wright on a close points decision. Lomax had previously lost to Wright during his amateur career. In the final he defeated former European light-welterweight champion Ted Bami to claim the £25,000 prize.
