= Larry Ekundayo =

Nigerian boxer (born 1982)

Personal information
- Nickname: The Natural
- Nationality: South African
- Born: 13 June 1982 (age 44) Lagos, Nigeria
- Height: 1.75 cm (1 in)
- Weight: Welterweight

Boxing career
- Reach: 66 1/2 in (169 cm)
- Stance: Orthodox

Boxing record
- Total fights: 17
- Wins: 16
- Win by KO: 3
- Losses: 1

Larry Ekundayo (born Olanrewaju Ekundayo on 13 June 1982) is a Nigerian professional boxer. He held the African welterweight title from 2015 to 2016 and the IBF European welterweight title from 2018 to 2019.

== Career ==
Ekundayo was born in Lagos, Nigeria on 13 June 1982. He started boxing for self defense at the age of 12. In 1998, he won the Nigerian Amateur Bantamweight Championship and participated in the 1999 All-Africa Games in South Africa. He made a career switch from bantamweight to welterweight and won the Nigerian Amateur Welterweight Championship in year 2000. He participated in the 2002 Commonwealth Games in Manchester, UK and finished as a quarter-finalist.

In 2006 and 2007, he won the championship title of the London Regional Amateur Boxing Association (ABA) championship. As an amateur, he won 110 of 125 fights he was engaged in.

Larry’s career as a professional boxer started in November 2012 when he defeated three boxers in one night to become the Light Middleweight Prizefighter champion in London. He was the first boxer in the competition to be given a £2,000 knockout bonus.

On 30 October 2016, he defended his African Boxing Union’s Welterweight title by beating Ghanaian boxer, Joseph ‘The Double Horror’ Lamptey.

On 13 July 2018, he won the IBF European title by defeating John Thain in London in a fight that lasted 12 rounds.

== Professional boxing record ==
17 fights	16 wins	1 loss
By knockout	3	0
By decision	13	1

No.	Result	Record	Opponent	Type	Round, time	Date	Location	Notes
17	Win	16–1	Nathan Hardy	PTS	6	15 Feb 2020	York Hall, London, England	
16	Win	15–1	Louis Greene	UD	10	14 Dec 2018	York Hall, London, England	Retained IBF European welterweight title
15	Win	14–1	John Thain	UD	12	13 Jul 2018	York Hall, London, England	Won vacant IBF European welterweight title
14	Win	13–1	Adam Grabiec	PTS	6	3 Mar 2018	Brentwood Centre, Essex, England	
13	Loss	12–1	Gary Corcoran	SD	12	8 Jul 2017	Copper Box Arena, London, England	For vacant WBO Inter-Continental welterweight title
12	Win	12–0	Arvydas Trizno	PTS	6	9 Dec 2016	Tolworth Recreation Centre, London, England	
11	Win	11–0	Joseph Lamptey	UD	12	30 Oct 2015	The Troxy, London, England	Won vacant African welterweight title
10	Win	10–0	William Warburton	PTS	6	25 Jul 2015	Olympia, Liverpool, England	
9	Win	9–0	Dale Evans	TKO	5 (10), 2:38	14 Mar 2015	York Hall, London, England	
8	Win	8–0	Stanislav Nenkov	PTS	10	11 Oct 2014	York Hall, London, England	Won vacant International Masters Silver welterweight title
7	Win	7–0	Samet Hyuseinov	PTS	6	12 Jul 2014	York Hall, London, England	
6	Win	6–0	Howard Cospolite	PTS	8	18 May 2013	York Hall, London, England	
5	Win	5–0	Terry Carruthers	TKO	3 (3), 2:36	3 Nov 2012	York Hall, London, England	Prizefighter: The Light Middleweights III – Final
4	Win	4–0	Kris Carslaw	UD	3	3 Nov 2012	York Hall, London, England	Prizefighter: The Light Middleweights III – Semi-final
3	Win	3–0	Craig McEwan	SD	3	3 Nov 2012	York Hall, London, England	Prizefighter: The Light Middleweights III – Quarter-final
2	Win	2–0	Lewis Byrne	PTS	4	20 Jun 2012	York Hall, London, England	
1	Win	1–0	Ben Deghani	TKO	3 (4), 1:09	23 Mar 2012	The Troxy, London, England	
