= Mark Lloyd (boxer) =

English Welterweight boxer (born 1975)

Personal information
- Nickname: Lloydy
- Nationality: British
- Born: Mark Lloyd; 21 September 1975 (age 50) Walsall, West Midlands, England
- Height: 5 ft 10 in (1.78 m)
- Weight: Welterweight

Boxing career
- Stance: Orthodox

Boxing record
- Total fights: 23
- Wins: 15
- Win by KO: 3
- Losses: 8
- Draws: 0
- No contests: 0

Mark Lloyd (born 21 September 1975) is an English Welterweight boxer.

Lloyd made his professional Boxing debut against Davy Jones which he won in his residence town of Telford. Lloyd has appeared several times on TV's Prizefighter.

== Personal life ==
Lloyd is married and has three children; they live in the town of Telford.

15 Win (3 knockout, 12 decision), 7 Losses, 0 Draws
Res.	Opponent	Type	Rd., Time	Date	Location	Notes
Win	(England) Dennis Corpe	PTS		2005-09-16	(United Kingdom) Oakengates Theatre, Telford	Lloyds Pro Debut
Win	(Latvia) Gatis Skuja	PTS		2005-12-04	(United Kingdom) Oakengates Theatre, Telford	
Win	(England) Davy Jones	PTS		2006-02-16	(United Kingdom) Dudley Town Hall, England	
Win	(England) Ben Hudson	PTS		2006-04-14	(United Kingdom) Oakengates, Telford, England	
Win	(Wales) Tommy Jones	PTS		2006-05-03	Sutton Leisure Complex, Sutton-in-Ashfield, Nottinghamshire, England	
Win	(Wales) Tommy Jones	PTS		2006-06-29	Dudley Town Hall, England	
Win	(England) Terry Jones	TKO		2006-10-06	(United Kingdom) Dunstall Racetrack, Wolverhampton	
Win	(England) Neil Bonner	PTS		2007-06-28	Dudley Town Hall, England	
Win	(Ukraine) Volodymyr Borovskyy	PTS		2007-09-15	(England) International Convention Centre, Birmingham	
Win	(England) Martin Marshall	RTD		2007-12-01	(England) Oakengates Theatre, Telford	
Lose	(England) Adnan Amar	PTS		2008-05-10	(England) Nottingham Arena	
Win	(England) A.A Lowe	TKO		2008-06-20	(England) Civic Centre Wolverhampton	
Lose	(Republic of the Congo) Ted Bami	UD		2008-10-24	(England) York Hall, London	
Win	(England) Steve Conway	UD		2008-10-24	(United Kingdom) York Hall, London	
Win	(England) Jamie Cox	TKO		2009-04-24	(England) Civic center Wolverhampton	
Win	(England) Matt Scriven	PTS		2010-02-22	(England) Birmingham	
Win	(Latvia) Alex Spitko	PTS		2010-05-24	(England) Birmingham	
Win	(England) Luke Osman	PTS		2010-10-04	(England) Birmingham	
Lose	(Italy) Licaino Abis	TD		2011-04-15	Italy	
Lose	(England) Young Mutley	SD		2012-02-11	(England) Civic Hall Wolverhampton	
Lose	(Canada) Pier Oliver Cote	TKO		2012-05-26	(England) Nottingham Arena	
Lose	(England) Nasser Al Harbi	PTS		2012-10-12	(England) Manchester	
