= Darren Corbett =

Irish boxer

Personal information
- Nickname: Raging Bull
- Nationality: Northern Irish
- Born: Darren Corbett; 9 July 1972 (age 54) Belfast, Northern Ireland
- Weight: Cruiserweight

Boxing career
- Stance: Orthodox

Boxing record
- Total fights: 38
- Wins: 29
- Win by KO: 16
- Losses: 8
- Draws: 1
- No contests: 0

Darren Corbett (born 9 July 1972 in Belfast, Northern Ireland), nicknamed Raging Bull, is a Northern Irish professional boxer. Corbett's weight fluctuated significantly throughout his career and although he had some fights at both heavyweight and light-heavyweight, the bulk of his contests and his success came at cruiserweight.

== Amateur ==
Corbett boxed for Ireland as an amateur before turning professional in December 1994, winning his first fight at the G-Mex Leisure Centre, Manchester, England, in which he knocked out Donaster's David Jules on a card that included Eamonn Loughran and Chris Eubank.

== Professional ==
Corbett won his first title belt, the vacant Irish cruiserweight title, in November 1996 with 5th round knockout win over Dubliner Ray Kane at the Ulster Hall in Belfast, Northern Ireland. After successfully defending that title against Nigel Rafferty and Noel Magee, Corbett added the Commonwealth cruiserweight championship to his resume with a win over the then-undefeated Chris Okoh.

Corbett successfully defended that belt against another undefeated fighter, and a man who would go on to hold the Title himself some 11 years later, Robert Norton. In addition to this, Corbett also won the lightly regarded IBO (International Boxing Organization) Inter-Continental Cruiserweight Championship. In his next fight after winning the IBO Title, however, Corbett lost his Commonwealth Championship by 10th Round TKO in a unification fight with British Champion Bruce Scott on 28 November 1998.

In March 1999, Corbett's next fight saw him also lose his IBO Inter-Continental Championship to a relative novice in Stephane Allouane, but he rebounded later that year by defeating future British & Commonwealth Light-Heavyweight Champion Neil Simpson to win the IBO Inter-Continental Light-Heavyweight Title, a belt he never lost in the ring.

Corbett retired from the sport in 2004 but made his comeback in 2008 with a 6-rounds points win in Dublin. On 19 May 2009 he competed in the first cruiserweight instalment of the 'Prizefighter' series, defeating the former Southern Area Heavyweight Champion Micky Steeds on a 3-round points decision in the quarter-finals before losing on a 2nd-Round stoppage to the unfancied Ovill McKenzie in the semi-finals.

He returned a year later for the second cruiserweight instalment of the 'Prizefighter' series. Again he won his first bout, this time against John Anthony, but he suffered a shock points defeat in the semi-final to journeyman Nick Okoth, who had record of 8-27-5 going into the bout. Okoth started the tournament as a reserve and only came into the tournament after an injury to Herbie Hide.

Corbett returned in April 2012, losing over 6 rounds to Michael Sweeney.
