= Sam Horton =

British boxer

Personal information
- Nickname: The Man
- Nationality: British
- Weight: Super middleweight

Boxing career
- Stance: Orthodox

Boxing record
- Total fights: 18
- Wins: 15
- Win by KO: 2
- Losses: 3
- Draws: 0

Sam "The Man" Horton (born 20 August 1985) is an English professional boxer who competes in the super middleweight division.

Horton turned Pro in 2006 after fighting as an amateur. Horton is the Midlands and International Masters super middleweight champion.

In May 2010 Horton fought Olympic gold medallist James DeGale at Upton Park.

In June 2010 Horton fought in the Prizefighter competition at York Hall, Bethnal Green, London but was knocked out of the competition at the quarter-final stage by Patrick Mendy who went on to win the competition. The fight was stopped after 92 seconds when referee Ian John-Lewis stepped in. Many believed that the stoppage was unnecessary as Horton was not hurt. Glenn McCrory, the former world cruiserweight champion, said on Sky Sports: "I thought it was premature. Horton should feel aggrieved.".

Horton is currently trained by Errol Johnson and is managed by London promoter Michael Helliet.
