= Robert Lloyd-Taylor =

English boxer

Personal information
- Nationality: English
- Born: 1 September 1980 (age 45) Perivale, England
- Height: 5 ft 11.25 in (1.81 m)
- Weight: Light Middleweight

Boxing career
- Stance: orthodox

Boxing record
- Total fights: 27
- Wins: 19
- Win by KO: 5
- Losses: 8
- Draws: 0

Robert Lloyd-Taylor (born 1 September 1980) is an English welterweight boxer.
