= Claus Bertino =

Danish boxer

Personal information
- Nationality: Danish
- Born: 2 June 1980 (age 38) Frederiksberg, Denmark
- Weight: heavyweight

Boxing career
- Stance: Orthodox

Boxing record
- Total fights: 19
- Wins: 15
- Win by KO: 8
- Losses: 4

Claus Bertino (born 2 June 1980) is a Danish former professional boxer.

== Amateur career ==
Bertino won a silver medal at the 2002 Acropolis Cup, held from May 29 to June 3 in Athens, Greece. Competing in the Super heavyweight category, Bertino was defeated by Roberto Cammarelle of Italy in the final.

== Professional career ==
Bertino turned professional winning his first fight in Brondbyhallen, Copenhagen, Denmark, when he beat Zoltan Komlosi by knockout.

=== Title fight ===
Bertino has only performed in one fight for a title belt, when he participated for the vacant Danish Heavyweight title, in December 2006 at the Antvorskovhallen, Slagelse, Denmark.

Bertino was the victor with a spectacular first-round knockout win over Steffen Nielsen.

In his next fight he lost to a knockout defeat at the hands of little known fighter Humberto Evora and that effectively ended his world dreams.
