= Leon Williams (boxer) =

English boxer

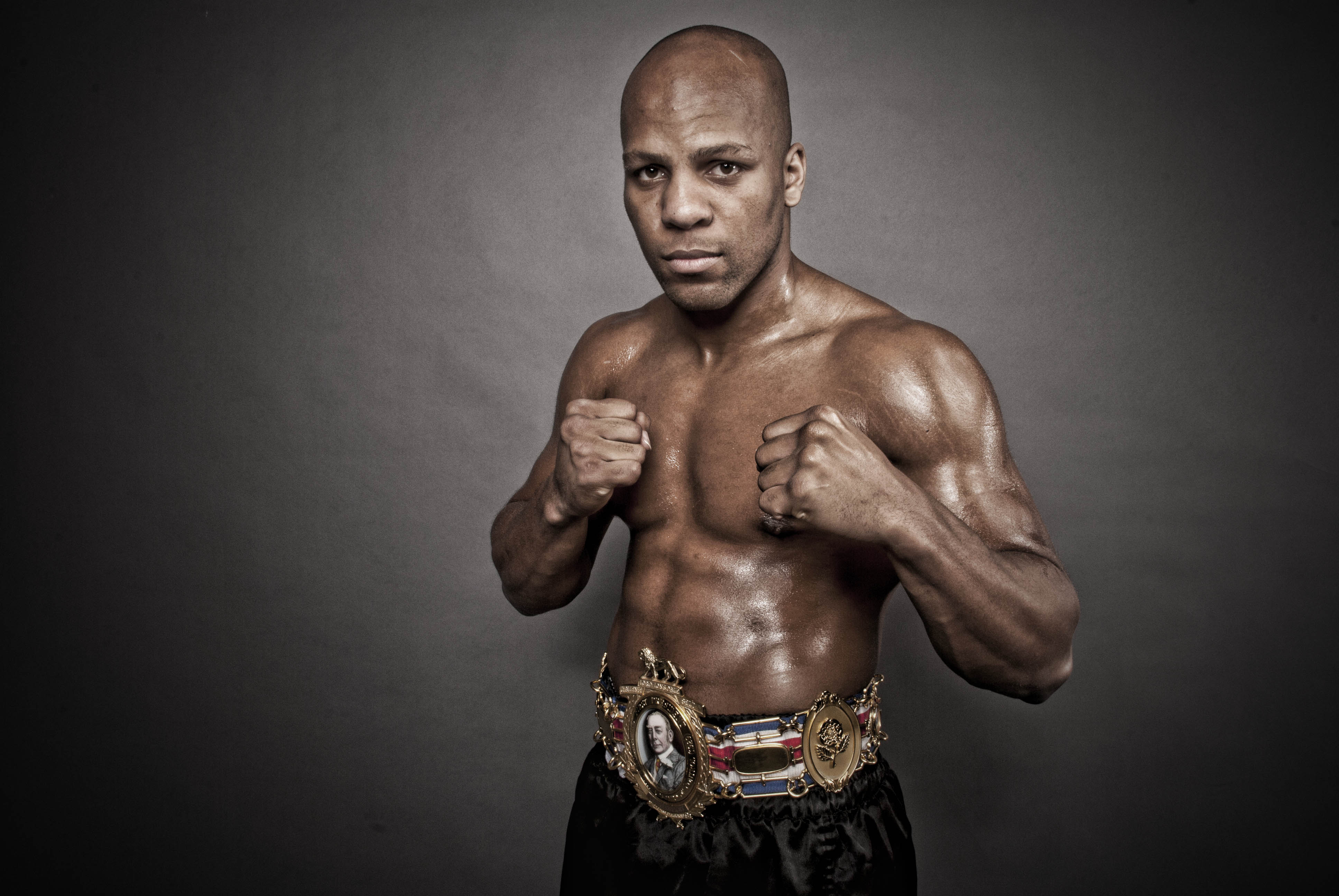

Personal information
- Nickname: Leon 'Solid' Williams
- Nationality: British
- Born: 6 November 1983 (age 42) London, UK
- Height: 5’10
- Website: www.teamsolidtraining.com

Boxing career
- Weight class: Cruiserweight
- Stance: orthodox

Boxing record
- Total fights: 15
- Wins: 9
- Win by KO: 4
- Losses: 6

Leon "Solid" Williams (born 6 November 1983) is a British former professional boxer who competed from 2009 to 2012. He held the British Cruiserweight title from 2011 to 2012.

Williams won the Southern Area title in October 2010 with a points win over JJ Ojuederie. This was followed by a second-round knockout loss to Richard Turba.

Williams became British cruiserweight champion following his controversial defeat of Robert Norton on 21 October 2011. Most observers had Norton comfortably winning the fight. Williams later returned to TRAD TKO Gym in Canning Town, proudly carrying the Lonsdale Belt and told gymmates: “I’m not letting that belt go … No one is great – they’re just normal and can be beaten, they can all be dominated by me.”

Williams lost the British title in January 2012 when he was stopped in the final round by Shane McPhilbin. This time, Williams was well ahead on the cards and had dropped McPhilbin earlier in the fight, but a late barrage saw the fight stopped.

Prior to facing Tony Conquest in July 2012, Williams described their relationship, saying: “We’re really good friends but that’s on hold until after the fight … Then I want a shot at getting back my British title.” In an interview published just before the fight, he reflected on the McPhilbin loss, saying: “We didn’t get hurt in any other round … It’s all history now. I’ll have a title around my waist again very soon.”

Williams fought Tony Conquest in July 2012 in an attempt to regain his Southern Area title. Conquest stopped Williams in the first round.

== Coaching and gym ownership ==
After retiring from professional competition, Williams remained involved in boxing through coaching and fitness training. In July 2025, he opened a new boxing and fitness gym called Team Solid Training in South Croydon. The facility offers boxing classes for all ages and abilities, including women-only, junior, and children’s classes, as well as high-intensity interval training and strength training sessions.

== Amateur and professional beginnings ==
Williams began boxing as a teenager, inspired by watching Mike Tyson fight Frank Bruno. He joined Balham Amateur Boxing Club at around age 15, then moved to Fitzroy Lodge in Kennington, where he competed in approximately 17 amateur bouts. He fought twice in the London ABA Championships, including a memorable bout against Ricky Newlands featuring three knockdowns, and scored an amateur knockout victory over future opponent Tony Conquest.

Williams made his professional debut on 21 June 2009, defeating Mark Nilsen on points. He began 2010 with a second-round knockout of Tyrone Wright and added a points win over John Anthony, before winning the Southern Area cruiserweight title by defeating JJ Ojuederie in October 2010.

In late 2010, he transitioned to the Ultrachem TKO Gym in Canning Town under coach Johnny Eames, who helped develop his aggressive, power-punching style and led to improved performances in knockouts over Danny Couzens and Nick Okoth.

Preceded by Robert Norton	British Cruiserweight Champion; 21 October 2011 – 13 January 2012	Succeeded by Shane McPhilbin
