= Dean Francis =

English boxer

Personal information
- Nickname: Star
- Nationality: British
- Born: Dean Temius Francis; 23 January 1974 Basingstoke, England
- Died: 25 May 2018 (aged 44)
- Height: 5 ft 10 in (178 cm)
- Weight: Super Middleweight; Light Heavyweight; Cruiserweight

Boxing career
- Stance: Orthodox

Boxing record
- Total fights: 40
- Wins: 34
- Win by KO: 26
- Losses: 5
- Draws: 1

Dean Temius Francis (23 January 1974 – 25 May 2018) was a British professional boxer who competed from 1994 to 2014. He held the British super middleweight title from 1997 to 1998; the EBU European super middleweight title in 1997; the Commonwealth light heavyweight title from 2007 to 2008; and the British light heavyweight title in 2008.

Following a debilitating shoulder injury in 1998, Francis broke off his career, returning in 2002 and continuing to box until 2014. He was diagnosed with terminal cancer of the bowel in January 2017, and fought a sixteen-month battle, before his death from the disease on 25 May 2018. He was 44 years old. Tributes paid by boxing promoters Barry Hearn and Eddie Hearn, as well as former world champions Tony Bellew and Anthony Crolla. He was nicknamed "Star".
