= Junior Witter =

British boxer (born 1974)

Personal information
- Nickname: The Hitter
- Nationality: British
- Born: 10 March 1974 (age 52) Bradford, West Yorkshire, England
- Height: 5 ft 7 in (170 cm)
- Weight: Light welterweight; Welterweight

Boxing career
- Reach: 67 in (170 cm)
- Stance: Orthodox; Southpaw

Boxing record
- Total fights: 53
- Wins: 43
- Win by KO: 23
- Losses: 8
- Draws: 2

Junior Witter (born 10 March 1974) is a British former world champion professional boxer who competed from 1997 to 2015. He held the WBC light welterweight world title from 2006 to 2008 and challenged once for the IBF light welterweight title in 2000. At regional level, he held the British and Commonwealth light welterweight title from 2002 to 2005; the EBU European Union light welterweight title in 2003; and the EBU European light welterweight title from 2004 to 2005; and the British welterweight title in 2012. Witter is Bradford's first World Boxing Champion.

== Professional career ==
=== Early professional years ===
Witter's first fight as a professional took place in January 1997 and scored a draw over Cameron Raeside at the Green Bank Leisure Centre in Derbyshire. He scored his first win as a professional in his next fight, travelling to Yarm to beat John Green over six rounds. Five more fights happened in 1997 (all wins) for Witter to end the year with a record of 6-0-1. Witter's next year as a professional started in the same way as his first, with a draw over Mark Grundy. Despite this he fought four more times during the year meaning that at the end of only his second year as a pro he had compiled of record of 12-0-2 scoring decent wins along the way over the likes of Jan Piet Bergman (35-1) and Mark Winters (13-1). The beginning of 1999 begun with a two-round win over Malcolm Melvin.

=== IBF light-welterweight title challenge ===
Witter gained four more victories, then in June 2000, with a record of 15-0-2, he was given a late-notice shot at a world title against American Zab Judah. The fight, which took place in Glasgow in Scotland on the undercard of Mike Tyson's fight with Lou Savarese, ended with first career defeat for the Englishman. Witter lasted the distance but lost on points to the champion. Speaking of the fight later on in his career and when he himself had finally won a World title, Witter said "It was a shot in the dark. During my first few years as a pro, I was struggling like mad financially, so when the shot came about it meant a really big payday. I thought: if I don't take it, I've got nothing - all my savings were gone and all my loans were on top of me. As far as the fight went, I didn't have enough experience. I wasn't even British champion and I had nine days to prepare for a shot at Judah, one of the best fighters in the world. I lost on points, but I learned so much. It taught me that I deserved to be at that level."

=== British, Commonwealth and European champion ===
Witter's response to his first defeat was to go the traditional route towards another crack at a World belt. Witter fought six more times since the Judah defeat, beating the likes of Steve Conway (TKO 4) and Colin Mayisela (TKO 2) before, in March 2002, meeting Alan Bosworth for the vacant British light welterweight title, claiming the belt with a stoppage in the third round. Witter's next fight saw him pick up the vacant Commonwealth title with a win over Ghanaian Laatekwei Hammond. Two more fights in 2002 saw him beat Lucky Sambo in a non-title fight and Italian Giuseppe Lauri in an eliminator for the WBO light welterweight title.

Only two fights in 2003 saw the double champion add to his collection when in April 2003 he beat Belgian Jurgen Haeck for the European Union title. A first defence of his Commonwealth title took place in September at the MEN Arena in Manchester with a win in the 2nd round giving victory over Kenyan Fred Kinuthia. Witter finally challenged for the full European title in June 2004 beating Italian Salvatore Battaglia at the Ice Arena in Nottingham. The year ended for Witter with a first defence of his European crown at the Conference Center in Wembley beating Polish fighter Krzyztof Bienias.

=== Route to a second world title challenge ===
In February 2005, Witter travelled to Los Angeles for a WBC Light Welterweight eliminator against Australian-based Lovemore N'dou. The fight which also doubled as a further defence of his Commonwealth title ended with a 12-round points decision win for the man from Bradford. In July of the same year Witter returned to the Ice Arena in Nottingham to score a win over Ukrainian Andriy Kotelnik in a close fought fight which was also a defence of his European title. Witter finished the year with a win over fellow Brit Colin Lynes in a fight which saw his British, Commonwealth and European titles all on the line at the same time. The fight, this time at the York Hall in London, ended with another points victory over 12 rounds for Witter.

=== WBC light-welterweight champion ===
September 2006 finally saw Witter win a world title when he challenged American Demarcus Corley for the vacant WBC light welterweight belt at the Alexandra Palace in Wood Green. Eighteen fights and eighteen wins since losing to Zab Judah in 2000 Witter had finally achieved the pinnacle of his career so far. Two defences of the title followed in 2007 with wins over Mexican Arturo Morua (TKO 9) and Guyanese Vivian Harris (KO 7) before on 10 May 2008, losing the belt to mandatory challenger Timothy Bradley via split decision. Following his loss to Bradley, Witter declared he would continue fighting at a professional level and vowed to return to the ring to reclaim his WBC crown. Bradley commented that he would be happy to offer Witter a rematch if the money was right.

=== Comeback ===
Following the Bradley defeat Witter returned to the ring on 8 November 2008 and scored a third-round knockout of Argentinian Victor Hugo Castro. He knocked his opponent down in the second but was unable to finish it due to the bell instead finishing the fight early in the following round. Witter was then given the chance to fight for his old WBC title when in May 2009, Timothy Bradley was stripped of the belt for choosing not to fight his mandatory challenger Devon Alexander. This handed Witter an opportunity to fight Alexander for the now vacant belt. The contest took place in California on 1 August 2009 with Alexander proving too strong for the former champion with Witter, claiming an elbow injury in round four, having to retire at the end of round eight. The injury meant that Witter did not fight again til 19 February 2011, a year and a half since the loss to Alexander. The fight, this time in Ontario, Canada, resulted in another loss for Witter as he was beaten over 10 rounds by Romanian boxer Victor Puiu for the WBC International silver welterweight title. On 7 June 2011, Witter entered the welterweight version of the Prizefighter tournament at the York Hall in London and defeated Nathan Graham and Kevin McIntyre on the way to the final. In the final, Witter lost a majority points decision to Moroccan born fighter Yassine El maachi.

On 16 November 2013, Witter faced Albanian upcoming boxer Timo Schwarzkopf. He lost by majority decision.

== Personal life ==
Witter studied at Carlton Bolling College, a high school located in Bradford, West Yorkshire.

== Early life ==
Witter trained at the Bradford Police Boys amateur boxing club in Girlington, Bradford, under Mr Allan (Pop Allan).

== Professional boxing record ==
53 fights	43 wins	8 losses
By knockout	23	1
By decision	20	7
Draws	2	

No.	Result	Record	Opponent	Type	Round, time	Date	Location	Notes
53	Loss	43–8–2	Ahmed El Mousaoui	SD	12	17 Apr 2015	La Palestre, Le Cannet, France	For European Union welterweight title
52	Win	43–7–2	Arvydas Trizno	TKO	4 (6), 0:41	17 May 2014	Town Hall, Leeds, England	
51	Win	42–7–2	Max Maxwell	PTS	6	22 Mar 2014	Ponds Forge, Sheffield, England	
50	Loss	41–7–2	Festim Kryeziu	MD	10	16 Nov 2013	MHPArena, Ludwigsburg, Germany	
49	Loss	41–6–2	Frankie Gavin	UD	12	12 Nov 2012	York Hall, London, England	Lost British welterweight title
48	Win	41–5–2	Colin Lynes	UD	12	12 May 2012	Hillsborough Leisure Centre, Sheffield, Yorkshire	Won British welterweight title
47	Win	40–5–2	Arvydas Trizno	PTS	6	7 Sep 2011	King's Hall, Belfast, Northern Ireland	
46	Loss	39–5–2	Yassine El maachi	MD	3	7 Jun 2011	York Hall, London, England	Prizefighter 19: welterweight final
45	Win	39–4–2	Kevin McIntyre	UD	3	7 Jun 2011	York Hall, London, England	Prizefighter 19: welterweight semi-final
44	Win	38–4–2	Nathan Graham	UD	3	7 Jun 2011	York Hall, London, England	Prizefighter 19: welterweight quarter-final
43	Loss	37–4–2	Victor Lupo Puiu	UD	10	19 Feb 2011	Hershey Centre, Mississauga, Ontario, Canada	For vacant WBC Silver International welterweight title
42	Loss	37–3–2	Devon Alexander	RTD	8 (12), 3:00	1 Aug 2009	Agua Caliente Casino Resort Spa, Rancho Mirage, California, US	For vacant WBC light-welterweight title
41	Win	37–2–2	Victor Hugo Castro	KO	3 (10), 1:10	8 Nov 2008	York Hall, London, England	
40	Loss	36–2–2	Timothy Bradley	SD	12	10 May 2008	Nottingham Arena, Nottingham, England	Lost WBC light-welterweight title
39	Win	36–1–2	Vivian Harris	KO	7 (12), 1:00	7 Sep 2007	The Dome Leisure Centre, Doncaster, England	Retained WBC light-welterweight title
38	Win	35–1–2	Arturo Morua	TKO	9 (12), 2:12	20 Jan 2007	Alexandra Palace, London, England	Retained WBC light-welterweight title
37	Win	34–1–2	DeMarcus Corley	UD	12	15 Sep 2006	Alexandra Palace, London, England	Won vacant WBC light-welterweight title
36	Win	33–1–2	Colin Lynes	UD	12	21 Oct 2005	York Hall, London, England	Retained European, British, and Commonwealth light-welterweight titles
35	Win	32–1–2	Andreas Kotelnik	UD	12	9 Jul 2005	Nottingham Arena, Nottingham, England	Retained European light-welterweight title
34	Win	31–1–2	Lovemore N'dou	UD	12	19 Feb 2005	Staples Center, Los Angeles, California, US	
33	Win	30–1–2	Krzysztof Bienias	TKO	2 (12), 2:04	12 Nov 2004	Wembley Conference Centre, London, England	Retained European light-welterweight title
32	Win	29–1–2	Salvatore Battaglia	TKO	2 (12), 1:18	2 Jun 2004	Nottingham Arena, Nottingham, England	Won vacant European light-welterweight title
31	Win	28–1–2	Oscar Hall	TKO	3 (10), 2:41	16 Apr 2004	Pennington's, Bradford, England	
30	Win	27–1–2	Fred Kinuthia	KO	2 (12), 2:51	27 Sep 2003	MEN Arena, Manchester, England	Retained Commonwealth light-welterweight title
29	Win	26–1–2	Jurgen Haeck	RTD	4 (10), 3:00	5 Apr 2003	MEN Arena, Manchester, England	Won European Union light-welterweight title
28	Win	25–1–2	Giuseppe Lauri	TKO	2 (12), 1:21	23 Nov 2002	Storm Arena, Derby, England	
27	Win	24–1–2	Lucky Sambo	TKO	2 (8), 2:52	19 Oct 2002	Braehead Arena, Glasgow, Scotland	
26	Win	23–1–2	Laatekwei Hammond	TKO	2 (12), 1:56	8 Jul 2002	Grosvenor House, London, England	Won vacant Commonwealth light-welterweight title
25	Win	22–1–2	Alan Bosworth	TKO	3 (12)	16 Mar 2002	Royal & Derngate, Northampton, England	Won vacant British light-welterweight title
24	Win	21–1–2	Colin Mayisela	TKO	2 (12), 0:45	27 Oct 2001	MEN Arena, Manchester, England	WBU International light-middleweight title
23	Win	20–1–2	Alan Temple	KO	5 (6), 2:25	27 Oct 2001	Ponds Forge, Sheffield, England	
22	Win	19–1–2	Brice Faradji	TKO	1 (6)	22 May 2001	Telde, Spain	
21	Win	18–1–2	David Kirk	TKO	2 (4), 1:10	10 Mar 2001	York Hall, London, England	
20	Win	17–1–2	Christopher Henry	TKO	3 (8)	25 Nov 2000	Wythenshawe Forum, Manchester, England	
19	Win	16–1–2	Steve Conway	TKO	4 (8)	20 Oct 2000	Ulster Hall, Belfast, Northern Ireland	
18	Loss	15–1–2	Zab Judah	UD	12	24 Jun 2000	Hampden Park, Glasgow, Scotland	For IBF light-welterweight title
17	Win	15–0–2	Arv Mittoo	PTS	4	8 Apr 2000	York Hall, London, England	
16	Win	14–0–2	Mihai Iorgu	TKO	1 (8)	21 Mar 2000	Telde, Spain	
15	Win	13–0–2	Harry Butler	PTS	6	6 Nov 1999	Kingsway Leisure Centre, Widnes, England	
14	Win	12–0–2	Isaac Cruz	PTS	8	17 Jul 1999	The Dome Leisure Centre, Doncaster, England	
13	Win	11–0–2	Malcolm Melvin	TKO	2 (12), 1:33	13 Feb 1999	Telewest Arena, Newcastle, England	Won vacant WBF (Federation) light-welterweight title
12	Win	10–0–2	Karl Taylor	PTS	4	28 Nov 1998	Hillsborough Leisure Centre, Sheffield, England	
11	Win	9–0–2	Mark Winters	PTS	8	5 Sep 1998	Ice Rink, Telford, England	
10	Win	8–0–2	Jan Piet Bergman	PTS	6	18 Apr 1998	NYNEX Arena, Manchester, England	
9	Win	7–0–2	Brian Coleman	PTS	6	5 Mar 1998	Royal Armouries Museum, Leeds, England	
8	Draw	6–0–2	Mark Ramsey	PTS	6	7 Feb 1998	Grundy Park Leisure Centre, Cheshunt, England	
7	Win	6–0–1	Michael Alexander	PTS	4	4 Oct 1997	Stadionsporthalle, Hanover, Germany	
6	Win	5–0–1	Brian Coleman	PTS	4	2 Aug 1997	Metrodome, Barnsley, England	
5	Win	4–0–1	Andreas Panayi	TKO	5 (6)	15 May 1997	Rivermead Leisure Centre, Reading, England	
4	Win	3–0–1	Trevor Meikle	PTS	6	25 Apr 1997	Golf and Country Club, Mere, England	
3	Win	2–0–1	Lee Molyneux	TKO	6 (6), 1:43	20 Mar 1997	The Willows, Salford, England	
2	Win	1–0–1	John Green	PTS	6	4 Mar 1997	Tall Trees Hotel, Yarm, England	
1	Draw	0–0–1	Cam Raeside	PTS	6	18 Jan 1997	Green Bank Leisure Centre, Swadlincote, England	

Sporting positions
Regional boxing titles
Vacant Title last held by Ricky Hatton	British light-welterweight champion 16 March 2002 – 2006; Vacated	Vacant Title next held by Lenny Daws
Vacant Title last held by Eamonn Magee	Commonwealth light-welterweight champion 8 July 2002 – 2006; Vacated	Vacant Title next held by Ajose Olusegun
Vacant Title last held by Oktay Urkal	European light-welterweight champion 2 June 2004 – 2006; Vacated	Vacant Title next held by Ted Bami
Preceded by Colin Lynes	British welterweight champion 12 May 2012 – 1 November 2012	Succeeded by Frankie Gavin
Minor world boxing titles
Vacant Title last held by Ricky Quiles	WBF (Federation) light-welterweight champion 13 February 1999 – June 2000; Vacated	Vacant Title next held by Johnny Bizzarro
Major world boxing titles
Vacant Title last held by Floyd Mayweather Jr.	WBC light-welterweight champion 15 September 2006 – 10 May 2008	Succeeded by Timothy Bradley
