= Kevin Anderson (boxer) =

Scottish boxer (born 1983)

Personal information
- Born: 26 April 1983 (age 43) Kirkcaldy, Scotland
- Height: 5 ft 8 1/2 in (174 cm)
- Weight: Welterweight

Boxing career
- Stance: Orthodox

Boxing record
- Total fights: 23
- Wins: 20
- Win by KO: 12
- Losses: 3
- Draws: 0

Kevin Anderson (born 26 April 1983) is a Scottish professional boxer who competed from 2003 to 2008. He held the Commonwealth welterweight title from 2005 to 2007 and the British welterweight title from 2006 to 2008.

== Early professional career ==
Anderson's first fight as a professional took place during April 2003 at the York Hall in Bethnal Green winning his fight in the second round against Paul Mcllwaine. An explosive beginning to his pro career saw him stop each of his next three opponents before going the distance for the first time against Sergey Starkov the tough Russian journeyman. One more points win that year against Frenchman Alban Mothie saw Anderson finish his debut year with an impressive record of 6–0. The fight against Mothie was also notable for the fact that it was the first time Anderson had fought in his native Scotland as a professional boxer. All his previous fights that year having been south of the border.

A further six fights and six wins were had during 2004 taking the young prospects record up to 12-0 by the end of that year. The reward for this came in January 2005 when Anderson would fight for the Celtic welterweight title in Glasgow, taking on and beating Northern Ireland's Glenn McClarnon who had just challenged David Barnes for the full British title in his previous fight. The bout ended in the 4th round when a clash of heads caused a cut above McClarnon's eye and forced the stoppage handing victory and a first career title to Anderson.

== British & Commonwealth champion ==
The new Celtic champion fought once more that year before meeting reigning champion Joshua Okine for the Commonwealth welterweight crown at the Ice Rink in Kirkcaldy, Anderson's home town. The fight was Anderson's toughest test to date with the Scot scoring a split decision win over the man from Ghana who had just beaten British champion Barnes in his previous fight. In March 2006 Anderson defended his newly won title with a victory over fellow Scot Craig Dickson. In June 2006, Anderson travelled south to the Aston Villa Leisure Centre in order to meet British title holder Young Mutley in a unification clash and according to some reports produced one of the comebacks of the year in order to take both belts home. Anderson had been put down in the 2nd round and suffered a nasty cut in the 4th and both fighters were taking some heavy punches before a left hook from Anderson left Mutley reeling in the 10th round. A punch that eventually led to the referee stopping the fight. The man from Kirkcaldy was the new unified British and Commonwealth title holder. One more non-title fight that year saw Anderson finish 2006 with two belts and an unbeaten record of 18–0.

== Defeat to Nuumbembe ==
Former soldier Ali Nuumbembe was the first man to defeat the Scot in a professional ring. The man from Namibia challenged for the Commonwealth title in February 2007 and ran out a close split decision winner in a fight which took place in Anderson's backyard, the Ice Rink in Kirkcaldy. Despite still have the consolation of holding the British belt Anderson was left fuming by the scoring of the fight made by one of the judges saying "It was ridiculous. It was like fighting in Italy...I thought I won six out of the first seven and was a round ahead by the time we went into the 12th round...I thought I nicked that round so I couldn't believe that scorecard. But I will come back, I have plenty of time on my side." He was however himself considered fortunate by some to get through the 8th after a cut above his left eye left Anderson struggling to get through the round.

== British champion ==
Anderson's next fight saw him defend his British title against Irishman and former WBU champion Eamonn Magee with Anderson claiming that the fight was a great improvement on his last saying "It was a great win. The key was just getting my head right...I was on my toes for the whole 12 rounds. It's a great achievement." In September 2007 he followed the win up with another defence against England's Francis Jones in a fight that proved to be a lot tougher than might have first been thought. Anderson had Jones down in the 10th round before the referee stepped in to stop the fight in the 12th. Speaking after what was now his second defence of his title Anderson said "I was giving him some of my best shots but, to be fair to him, he kept taking them and coming back for more...I thought as the fight went into the later stages that his corner might have pulled him out but he kept coming back for more and more, so all credit to the lad. He gave it everything."

== Fights with Kevin McIntyre ==
Fellow Scot Kevin McIntyre stunned the British boxing in November 2007 when in what was to be Kevin Anderson's third defence of the title he found himself thoroughly outboxed and put down a number of times by the challenger. McIntyre himself had suffered a number of defeats in his boxing career and was thought to have found his level before winning a unanimous eventual decision to claim the title. An immediate rematch clause was applied and the two boxers found themselves facing each other once again in February 2008. The fight ended in another win for a delighted McIntyre who said after claiming another points win "I needed to prove the last fight wasn't a fluke...Anderson showed that he might have been under par in the first fight but he wasn't tonight, he showed that he was a tough fighter"

The back to back defeats to McIntyre left Anderson needing to refocus and saw the former champion take some time off from the sport. Speaking to Boxing News about his break from the ring he said "I needed some time away, to spend with my two kids, to get my head right and around the McIntyre fights. I moved house, had a kid, moved house again, had another kid. I needed the break"

Preceded by Joshua Okine; SD 12	Commonwealth Welterweight Champion; 30 September 2005 – 16 February 2007; L SD 12	Succeeded by Ali Nuumbembe
Preceded by Young Mutley; TKO 10	British Welterweight Champion; 1 June 2006 – 2 November 2007; L PTS 12	Succeeded by Kevin McIntyre

== See also ==
- List of British welterweight boxing champions
