= Víctor Castro =

Víctor Castro may refer to:

- Víctor Castro (landowner) (1820–1900), landowner in California
- Víctor Castro (weightlifter) (born 1992), Spanish weightlifter
- Víctor Castro (weightlifter, born 1977), Peruvian weightlifter
- Víctor Castro (Mexican politician), Mexican politician from Baja California Sur
- Victor Hugo Castro (born 1975), boxer from Argentina
- Víctor Manuel Castro (1924–2011), Mexican actor, screenwriter and film director
