= Michael Jennings (boxer) =

British former professional boxer (born 1977)

Personal information
- Nickname: The Lurcher
- Nationality: British
- Born: 9 September 1977 (age 48) Preston, England
- Height: 5 ft 9 1/2 in (177 cm)
- Weight: Welterweight

Boxing career
- Reach: 69 in (175 cm)
- Stance: Orthodox

Boxing record
- Total fights: 39
- Wins: 36
- Win by KO: 17
- Losses: 3

Michael "The Lurcher" Jennings (born 9 September 1977) is a British former professional boxer who competed from 1999 to 2010. He challenged once for the vacant WBO welterweight title in 2009. At regional level, he held the British welterweight title from 2005 to 2006. He has 2 sons, Mikey and Jack, and a daughter, Macy.

== Professional career ==
Jennings turned with a 1st-round knockout of Tony Smith. Jennings in his early fights, with victories over journeyman fighters such as Lee Molyneux, Brian Coleman and Paul Denton. In May, 2003, Jennings won his first title when he defeated Jimmy Gould for the minor WBU International welterweight title. On 1 October 2004, he won the English welterweight championship with a 5th round stoppage of Chris Saunders.

=== British Title ===
In July 2005, he won the vacant British welterweight title with a 1st-round knockout of Jimmy Vincent. On 25 October 2005, Jennings recovered from a 1st round knockdown to go on to defeat Bradley Pryce on points in a defence of his British title. In January 2006, Jennings lost the title via a close split decision defeat to Young Mutley in his second title defence. Following the defeat to Mutley, Jennings returned to the ring in September 2006 to knockout Slovakian Rastislav Kovac in 3 rounds.

=== WBU title ===
On 7 April 2007, Jennings defeated Mehrdud Takaloo via a unanimous points decision to win the WBU welterweight title. The fight was held at the Millennium Stadium, Cardiff on the undercard of Joe Calzaghe's fight with Peter Manfredo Jr. On 2 February 2008, Jennings stopped Ross Minter, son of former World champion Alan Minter, in the 9th of a 12-round contest round en route to defending his WBU title.

=== Vs Miguel Cotto ===
On 21 February 2009 Jennings was defeated via 5th-round TKO by the now retired five-time, 3 weight world champion Miguel Cotto for the vacant WBO Welterweight Title in New York's, Madison Square Garden.

== Championships held ==
- British Weltwerweight title
- English Welterweight title
- WBU International Welterweight title

== Notable bouts ==
Result	Opponent	Type	Rd., Time	Date	Location	Notes
Loss	(United Kingdom) Kell Brook	TKO	5 (12)	18 September 2010		
Loss	(Puerto Rico) Miguel Cotto	TKO	5 (12), 2.36	21 February 2009	New York City, United States	Lost fight for vacant WBO Welterweight title.
Win	(United Kingdom) Ross Minter	KO	9 (12), 2.59	2 February 2008	London, England	Defended WBU Welterweight title.
Win	(Iran) Mehrdud Takaloo	Decision (unanimous)	12	7 Apr 2007	(United Kingdom) Cardiff, Wales	Won WBU Welterweight title.
Loss	(United Kingdom) Young Mutley	Decision (Split)	12	28 January 2006	(United Kingdom) Nottingham, England	Lost British Welterweight title.
Win	(United Kingdom) Bradley Pryce	Decision (unanimous)	12	25 October 2005	(United Kingdom) Preston, England	Defended British Welterweight title.
Win	(United Kingdom) Jimmy Vincent	KO	1 (12), 3.10	16 July 2005	(United Kingdom) Bolton, England	Won vacant British Welterweight title.
Win	(United Kingdom) Chris Saunders	TKO	5 (12)	1 October 2004	(United Kingdom) Manchester, England	Won BBBofC English welterweight title.

== See also ==
- List of British welterweight boxing champions

Preceded by Chris Saunders	BBBofC English Welterweight Champion; 1 October 2004 – 10 December 2005; Vacated	Succeeded by Ross Minter; Vacated
Preceded by David Barnes; Vacated	BBBofC British Welterweight Champion; 16 July 2005 – 28 January 2006	Succeeded by Young Mutley
Preceded by Mehrdud Takaloo	WBU Welterweight Champion; 7 April 2007 – 2008; Vacated	Succeeded by Vacant
