= David Barnes (boxer) =

English boxer (born 1981)

Personal information
- Nationality: British
- Born: David Smith; 16 January 1981 (age 45) Manchester, England
- Height: 5 ft 8 1/2 in (174 cm)
- Weight: Light welterweight; Welterweight

Boxing career
- Reach: 72 in (183 cm)
- Stance: Southpaw

Boxing record
- Total fights: 34
- Wins: 29
- Win by KO: 11
- Losses: 3
- Draws: 1

David Barnes (born David Smith, 16 January 1981) is a British former professional boxer who competed from 2001 to 2015. He held the British welterweight title from 2003 to 2004 and the British super lightweight title in 2008.

== Career ==
Barnes made his professional debut in July 2001 when at the Manchester Velodrome he stopped Trevor Smith in the second round of their four-round match. After compiling an undefeated ledger of 12-0 he was just two years later in July 2003 given the opportunity to fight for the vacant British Welterweight title against the experienced Jimmy Vincent. Barnes claimed victory with a narrow score of 115-114 from the referee John Keane in what was described by commentators as "an excellent match from start to finish". Barnes early career suffered a hiccup when the boxer was forced to spend six weeks at an army detention centre in Colchester. Unknown to his promoters and after seven straight victories on Sky the boxer had been absent without official leave from the army for a total of 18 months until a passport check by promoter Frank Warren revealed he had deserted from the army. Speaking of the experience to The Daily Telegraph in January 2003 Barnes said "I hated nearly every minute" having joined up as a restless 15-year-old.

Now the full British champion and still relatively inexperienced with a record of 13-0 Barnes set about defending his title and trying to claim the Lonsdale belt outright. He re-entered the ring in December 2003 to defend for the first time against Scotsman Kevin McIntyre at the MEN Arena in Manchester winning when the fight was stopped after the eighth round. He followed up the win with further defences against Northern Ireland's Glenn McClarnon and England's James Hare which gave him the Lonsdale belt for keeps.

Barnes kept busy after the win over Hare with a victory over future European title challenger Juho Tolppola from Finland before meeting the Glossop based Namibian Ali Nuumbembe for the WBO Inter-continental welterweight title. The fight was very close and ended up with the match being declared a draw.

In June 2005, Barnes fought Ghana's Commonwealth champion Joshua Okine, where he was put down in the fifth round and stopped in the 12th. It was his first career defeat. In choosing to fight Okine, Barnes had not allowed himself enough time to defend his British title and so had to give it up.

Barnes fought five times over the next two years competing against a host of journeymen. In March 2008 he was given the opportunity to fight for a championship again—the British light welterweight version. The opponent at the George Carnall Center in Davyhulme was former European champion Ted Bami and Barnes ran out a comfortable points winner becoming the first man to have held the British title at welter and light welterweight. In July 2008 he defended the title for the first time against former champion Barry Morrison from Scotland again winning on points over 12. Barnes was stripped of the title after he pulled out of a mandatory defence against former champion Colin Lynes. Barnes did not fight again until 4 December 2009 when he competed in the light welterweight version of the Prizefighter series and ironically was drawn to face the man he should have defended his British title against, Colin Lynes in the quarter finals. The fight over three rounds resulted in a split decision win for Lynes and handed Barnes only his second defeat.

Preceded by Colin Lynes vacated	British Light welterweight Champion; 14 March 2008 – 5 December 2008 stripped	Succeeded by Paul McCloskey
Preceded by Neil Sinclair vacated	British Welterweight Champion; 17 July 2003 – 16 July 2005 vacated	Succeeded by Michael Jennings
