= Nigel Wright (boxer) =

British boxer

Personal information
- Nationality: (United Kingdom) British
- Born: Nigel Wright; 22 June 1979 (age 47) Bishop Auckland, England
- Weight: Light Welterweight

Boxing career
- Stance: Southpaw

Boxing record
- Total fights: 31
- Wins: 24
- Win by KO: 10
- Losses: 6
- Draws: 1
- No contests: 0

Nigel Wright (born 22 June 1979 in Bishop Auckland, England) is a professional boxer, fighting out of Crook, County Durham. He is a southpaw fighter standing at 175 centimetres (69 in), with a record of 24-6-1, with 10 KOs and is a three-time English light welterweight champion and a two-time challenger for both the British and the Commonwealth titles.

Prior to his professional career he beat M. Lomax on 30 March 2000 in the National ABA Championships at the Metrodome in Barnsley, to become ABA (light welterweight) Champion.

== Professional boxing career ==
=== Early professional career ===
Nigel made his professional debut on 10 February 2001 defeating Keith Jones at the Kingway Leisure Centre in Widnes. He won his next four fights establishing an unbeaten record of 5-0 before suffering a first career defeat at the hands of future British champion Kevin McIntyre. Wright rebounded from the setback to score a string of seven further victories and so setting up a challenge for the English light welterweight title having established a record of 12-1.

=== English champion ===
The fight for the English belt on 11 March 2005 took place at the Doncaster Dome and saw the unbeaten Dean Hickman (12-0) in the opposite corner. Wright won the contest with a knock out in the 7th round and so claimed a first career title. One successful defence followed against Alan Bosworth on 27 May 2005 and this was followed up by a revenge win over Scotsman Kevin McIntyre on 5 November 2005, stopping him in the first round.

One more win followed before Wright challenged Lenny Daws for the vacant British title on 12 May 2006 at the York Hall in Bethnal Green. The challenge was to end in disappointment with Wright suffering a second career defeat, losing over 12 rounds. Compensation for the defeat came in his very next fight on 4 November 2006, picking up the now vacant English belt, beating Gary Reid to become a two-time English champion.

=== Tournaments ===
Wright followed up the Reid win with a victory over American Jonathon Nelson as part of the UK vs USA Contender challenge at the Metro Arena in Newcastle and then fought former British champion Lenny Daws for his English belt, this time keeping hold of the belt by scoring a draw. On 8 February 2008 he challenged Ajose Olusegun for the Commonwealth belt only to lose for the third time in his career. A further defeat followed in his very next fight, travelling to Limerick and losing to Paul McCloskey over 10 rounds.

On 24 October 2008, Wright moved up a weight division to take part in the Prizefighter tournament featuring the welterweights. He defeated another former English champion, Ross Minter, in the quarter-finals only to lose to eventual tournament winner Michael Lomax in a controversial semi. Wright rebounded from the defeat to Lomax with a victory over journeyman Arek Malek. The fight set him up for a further crack at the British and Commonwealth titles now both held by former opponent Ajose Olusegun on 12 June 2009 at the Olympia in Liverpool, only to lose once again via a points decision.

=== Win against Arthur and English title ===
On 5 December 2009 Wright returned to action and bounced back from the defeat to Olusegan with his biggest win to date, beating former WBO super-featherweight champion Alex Arthur in an 8-round points decision. The fight, on the undercard of Amir Khan's WBA world title defence against Dmitriy Salita was a step up for Wright who rose to the challenge to cause a major upset and have Arthur questioning his future in the sport. On 23 July 2010 Wright claimed the English title, for the third time beating Dean Harrison over 10 rounds and despite being given a count in the 7th round after touching down. Wright had stated before the fight that should he win the contest with Harrison, another shot at the British title would be his main aim, a title which at the time was held by old rival Lenny Daws. On 12 February 2011 Wright beat the undefeated Jamie Speight in a six-round contest at the Olympia in Liverpool, winning by stoppage in the 5th round. On 28 May 2011 he defeated Nicki Smedley over 10 rounds in Hillsborough Leisure Centre, Sheffield to defend his English title.
