= Mutley =

Mutley or Muttley can refer to:

- Young Mutley (born 1976), British boxer and former British welterweight champion
- Mutley railway station, a former railway station in Plymouth, UK
- Muttley, a cartoon character created by Hanna-Barbera

== See also ==
- Mutley Plain, a street and surrounding area in Plymouth
