= Colin Lynes =

English boxer (born 1977)

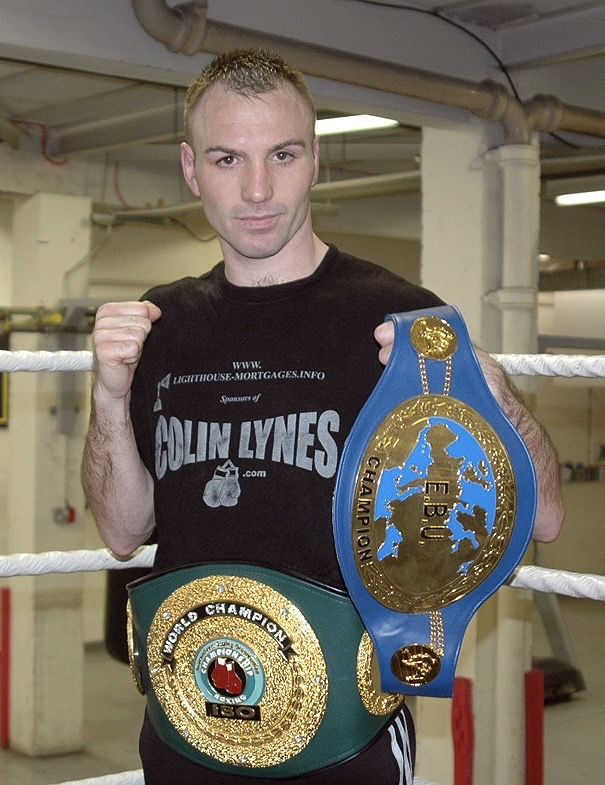
- Colin Lynes with IBO world and European title

Personal information
- Nationality: British
- Born: 26 November 1977 (age 48) Whitechapel, London, England
- Height: 5 ft 7 1/2 in (171 cm)
- Weight: Light welterweight; Welterweight

Boxing career
- Reach: 69 in (175 cm)
- Stance: Orthodox

Boxing record
- Total fights: 51
- Wins: 39
- Win by KO: 12
- Losses: 12

Colin Lynes (born 26 November 1977) is a British former professional boxer who competed from 1998 to 2017. He held the International Boxing Organization super lightweight title from 2004 to 2005. At regional level, he held the British super lightweight title in 2007; the European Boxing Union European super lightweight title from 2007 to 2008; and the British welterweight title from 2011 to 2012.

== Boxing career ==
=== Early professional career ===
Lynes begun his pro career in June 1998 with a 1st-round knockout of Lee Frost at the Broadway Theatre in Barking, London. He continued with 3 more quick victories over Ram Singh, Brian Coleman and Trevor Smith before finally completing the distance against Marc Smith. However hand problems in his next fight against Dennis Griffin forced him to develop an effective counter punching style. After compiling an unbeaten ledger of 20–0 he found himself in December 2002 competing for the IBO inter-continental light welterweight title, winning by 9th round tko against American Richard Kiley. He lost the title however in his next fight, when at the York Hall he was stopped in the 8th round by South African Samuel Malinga.

=== Championship fights ===
Following the defeat Lynes regrouped by winning his next three fights setting himself up for a shot at the full IBO light welterweight champion Argentinian Daniel Sarmiento. The fight at the Goresbrook Leisure Center in Dagenham in May 2005 ended with a split decision victory for the Englishman. This time he made his first defence a successful one when in Brentwood, Essex he met American Juaquin Gallardo winning by majority decision.

In October 2005 Lynes met fellow Brit Junior Witter for the British, Commonwealth and European titles losing a 12-round decision. He followed this defeat by losing again, this time to Lenny Daws still a 12–0 prospect for the English Southern Area title. The fight which ended with Lynes being stopped in the 9th round also doubled as an eliminator for the full British title with Daws going on to win the full crown.

=== British and European Champion ===
Lynes regrouped from his back to back defeats with two wins before in June 2007 he met Scotsman Barry Morrison for the full British title. The fight which took place at the Civic Center in Motherwell ended with Lynes claiming victory after 12 rounds. He defended the title in his next fight which also saw Lynes compete for the vacant European title. The opponent was Wolverhampton's Young Mutley, the former British Welterweight champion, the fight ended with an 8th round win for Lynes who was now a double champion. The Finnish fighter Juho Tolppola was next in line for Lynes for his first defence of his European crown with the fight ending in another 12 round win for the Englishman.

An Italian job was next for Lynes as he met mandatory challenger Gianluca Branco in Italy for his next defence. To defend against the Italian he had to give up his British belt which was subsequently won by Manchester's David Barnes. The fight itself ended in disappointment for Lynes as he lost a close split decision to the former World title challenger despite putting his opponent down in the 2nd round. Following the loss to Branco, Lynes was next in line to fight for his old British title against David Barnes. With one week to go Barnes pulled out of the fight and was stripped of the title leaving Lynes to fight for the now vacant title against Northern Irishman Paul McCloskey. McCloskey ended up winning the fight when Lynes retired in the 9th round.

The victory for McCloskey over Lynes meant that he became the mandatory challenger for Lynes' old European belt which was now vacant, only for a hand injury to rule the Irishman out only two weeks before the fight. McCloskeys lost opportunity was Lynes gain as he was drafted in to fight for the title against Frenchman Souleymane M'baye, a former WBA world champion in Paris on 3 July 2009. The fight was another close one for the former champion as he lost via split decision.

=== Prizefighter and Commonwealth title challenge ===
On 4 December 2009 Lynes competed in Sky's Prizefighter knock out style tournament. The competition included a number of successful British light welterweight boxers from recent years with Lynes winning two contests to reach the final. The draw for the competition which had been made by Floyd Mayweather pitted Lynes against David Barnes, the man who had succeeded Lynes as British champion in the quarter-finals. A split decision win over Barnes moved Lynes into the semi's to meet former victim Young Mutley and emerge victorious for the second time against the man from Wolverhampton via another split decision. The final saw Lynes compete with Newbridge's Gavin Rees, a man who had briefly held the World WBA light welterweight championship in 2007 and who was supported at ringside by former stablemate Joe Calzaghe. Rees, who had knocked out former European champions Ted Bami and Jason Cook on the way the final, won with a unanimous decision over Lynes, himself a former European champion.

Lynes return to the ring following the Prizefighter tournament saw him compete on the undercard of David Hayes world heavyweight title defence against John Ruiz at the MEN Arena in Manchester. His opponent, Ajose Olusegun, a Nigerian with British nationality was undefeated in 27 fights and was ranked at number 2 by the WBC. The fight, on 3 April 2010, resulted in Olusegun retaining his title after a stomach problem caused by a series of body shots had Lynes gasping for breath and him been counted out in the 8th round. Following the fight Lynes blamed the problems recovering from the shots on problems he had making the weight for the fight and said he would consider moving up a weight.

=== Move to Welterweight ===
Lynes moved up a weight division in his next fight on 12 February 2012 against Bradley Pryce, defeating the Welshman in a close 8 round contest in Liverpool with the referee handing victory to Lynes 78–77. On 7 June 2011 Lynes once again took part in the Prizefighter tournament although this time it was the welterweight version at the York Hall in Bethnal Green. He reached the semi-finals beating his stablemate Bobby Gladman in the quarter-finals but losing to eventual winner Yassine El Maachi with a controversial split decision in the semi's. On 9 November 2011 Lynes challenged Lee Purdy for the British welterweight championship, winning after 12 rounds via majority decision.

== Professional boxing record ==
51 fights	39 wins	12 losses
By knockout	12	3
By decision	27	9

No	Result	Record	Opponent	Type	Round, time	Date	Location	Notes
51	Loss	39–12	Michael McKinson	TKO	6 (10)	25 November 2017	Mountbatten Centre, Portsmouth, England	For vacant WBC International Silver welterweight title
50	Win	39–11	Mario Petrov	PTS	8 (8)	19 May 2017	Brentwood Centre, Essex, England	
49	Win	38–11	Nathan Hardy	PTS	6 (6)	17 March 2017	Brentwood Centre, Essex, England	
48	Loss	37–11	Bradley Skeete	UD	10 (10)	30 November 2013	Copper Box Arena, Queen Elizabeth Olympic Park, Hackney Wick, England	For vacant English welterweight title
47	Win	37–10	Beka Sutidze	DQ	6 (8)	1 June 2013	York Hall, Bethnal Green, England	Sutidze disqualified for repeated head clashes
46	Loss	36–10	Junior Witter	UD	12 (12)	12 May 2012	Hillsborough Leisure Centre, Sheffield, England	Lost British welterweight title
45	Win	36–9	Lee Purdy	MD	12 (12)	9 November 2011	York Hall, Bethnal Green, England	Won British welterweight title
44	Loss	35–9	Yassine El Maachi	SD	3 (3)	7 June 2011	York Hall, Bethnal Green, England	Prizefighter welterweight semi-final
43	Win	35–8	Bobby Gladman	UD	3 (3)	7 June 2011	York Hall, Bethnal Green, England	Prizefighter welterweight quarter-final
42	Win	34–8	Bradley Pryce	PTS	8 (8)	12 February 2011	Olympia, Liverpool, England	
41	Loss	33–8	Ajose Olusegun	KO	8 (12)	3 April 2010	M.E.N. Arena, Manchester, England	For Commonwealth super-lightweight title
40	Loss	33–7	Gavin Rees	UD	3 (3)	4 December 2009	Olympia, Kensington, England	Prizefighter light-welterweight final
39	Win	33–6	Young Mutley	SD	3 (3)	4 December 2009	Olympia, Kensington, England	Prizefighter light-welterweight semi-final
38	Win	32–6	David Barnes	SD	3 (3)	4 December 2009	Olympia, Kensington, England	Prizefighter light-welterweight quarter-final
37	Loss	31–6	Souleymane M'Baye	SD	12 (12)	3 July 2009	Palais des Sport Marcel Cerdan, Levallois-Perret, France	For European super-lightweight title
36	Loss	31–5	Paul McCloskey	RTD	9 (12)	5 December 2008	Goresbrook Leisure Centre, Dagenham, England	For vacant British super-lightweight title
35	Loss	31–4	Gianluca Branco	SD	12 (12)	16 May 2008	PalaRuffini, Torino, Italy	Lost European super-lightweight title
34	Win	31–3	Juho Tolppola	UD	12 (12)	25 January 2008	Goresbrook Leisure Centre, Dagenham, England	Retained European super-lightweight title
33	Win	30–3	Young Mutley	TKO	8 (12)	20 July 2007	Civic Hall, Wolverhampton, England	Retained British super-lightweight title; won vacant European super-lightweight title
32	Win	29–3	Barry Morrison	UD	12 (12)	8 June 2007	Civic Centre, Motherwell, Scotland	Won British super-lightweight title
31	Win	28–3	Arek Malek	RTD	2 (6)	30 March 2007	K2 Leisure Centre, Crawley, England	
30	Win	27–3	Janos Petrovics	TKO	6 (6)	15 December 2006	York Hall, Bethnal Green, England	
29	Loss	26–3	Lenny Daws	TKO	9 (12)	20 January 2006	York Hall, Bethnal Green, England	For Southern Area super-lightweight title
28	Loss	26–2	Junior Witter	UD	12 (12)	21 October 2005	York Hall, Bethnal Green, England	For British, Commonwealth & European super-lightweight titles
27	Win	26–1	Juaquin Gallardo	MD	12 (12)	13 February 2005	Brentwood Centre, Essex, England	Retained IBO super-lightweight title
26	Win	25–1	Pablo Daniel Sarmiento	SD	12 (12)	8 May 2004	Goresbrook Leisure Centre, Dagenham, England	Won IBO super-lightweight title
25	Win	24–1	Cesar Alberto Leiva	PTS	8 (8)	31 January 2004	York Hall, Bethnal Green, England	
24	Win	23–1	Fabrice Colombel	PTS	6 (6)	22 November 2003	Kings Hall, Belfast, Northern Ireland	
23	Win	22–1	Brian Coleman	PTS	4 (4)	18 October 2003	M.E.N. Arena, Manchester, England	
22	Loss	21–1	Samuel Malinga	RTD	8 (12)	8 March 2003	York Hall, Bethnal Green, England	Lost IBO Intercontinental super-lightweight title
21	Win	21–0	Richard Kiley	TKO	9 (12)	7 December 2002	Brentwood Centre, Essex, England	Won IBO Intercontinental super-lightweight title
20	Win	20–0	Abdelilah Touil	KO	7 (8)	21 September 2002	Brentwood Centre, Essex, England	
19	Win	19–0	Ian Smith	TKO	7 (8)	29 June 2002	Brentwood Centre, Essex, England	
18	Win	18–0	Kevin Bennett	TKO	4 (8)	18 May 2002	London Arena, Millwall, England	
17	Win	17–0	Peter Dunn	PTS	4 (4)	23 March 2002	Elephant & Castle Centre, Southwark, England	
16	Win	16–0	David Kirk	PTS	6 (6)	26 January 2002	Goresbrook Leisure Centre, Dagenham, England	
15	Win	15–0	Leonti Vorontsuk	PTS	6 (6)	1 December 2001	York Hall, Bethnal Green, England	
14	Win	14–0	Keith Jones	PTS	6 (6)	10 November 2001	Wembley Conference Centre, London, England	
13	Win	13–0	David Kirk	PTS	6 (6)	10 April 2001	Wembley Conference Centre, London, England	
12	Win	12–0	Mark Ramsey	PTS	6 (6)	17 February 2001	York Hall, Bethnal Green, England	
11	Win	11–0	Jimmy Phelan	PTS	6 (6)	9 December 2000	Elephant & Castle Centre, Southwark, England	
10	Win	10–0	Brian Coleman	PTS	6 (6)	14 October 2000	Wembley Conference Centre, London, England	
9	Win	9–0	Karl Taylor	PTS	6 (6)	16 September 2000	York Hall, Bethnal Green, England	
8	Win	8–0	Jason Vlasman	KO	2 (6)	18 May 2000	York Hall, Bethnal Green, England	
7	Win	7–0	Mark Haslam	PTS	4 (4)	20 May 1999	Broadway Theatre, Barking, England	
6	Win	6–0	Dennis Griffin	PTS	6 (6)	25 February 1999	The Forum, Kentish Town, England	
5	Win	5–0	Trevor Smith	TKO	1 (6)	10 December 1998	Broadway Theatre, Barking, England	
4	Win	4–0	Marc Smith	PTS	4 (4)	31 October 1998	Ice Rink, Basingstoke, England	
3	Win	3–0	Brian Coleman	TKO	2 (4)	22 October 1998	Broadway Theatre, Barking, England	
2	Win	2–0	Ram Singh	KO	1 (6)	23 July 1998	Broadway Theatre, Barking, England	
1	Win	1–0	Les Frost	KO	1 (6)	4 June 1998	Broadway Theatre, Barking, England	

Preceded by Lee Purdy	British Welterweight Champion; 9 November 2011 – 25 May 2012	Succeeded by Junior Witter
Preceded by Ted Bami; Vacated	European Light welterweight Champion; 20 July 2007 – 16 May 2008	Succeeded by Gianluca Branco
Preceded by Barry Morrison	British Light welterweight Champion; 8 June 2007 – 14 March 2008 vacated	Succeeded by David Barnes
