= Okine =

Okine is a surname. Notable persons with that name include:

- Earl Okine (born 1990), American football defensive end
- Emmanuel Okine (born 1991), Ghanaian footballer
- Joshua Okine (born 1980), Ghanaian boxer
- Matt Okine (born 1985), Australian comedian, actor, and radio presenter
- Robert Okine (born 1937), Ghanaian bishop
- Sheila Okine (born 1979), Ghanaian footballer

== See also ==
- Hayley Okines (1997–2015), English girl with the extremely rare aging disease progeria
