= Joe Calzaghe vs. Peter Manfredo Jr. =

Boxing match

Pride Under Pressure
- Date: 7 April 2007
- Venue: Millennium Stadium, Cardiff, Wales
- Title(s) on the line: WBO, and The Ring super middleweight titles

Tale of the tape
Boxer	Joe Calzaghe	Peter Manfredo Jr.
Nickname	"Pride of Wales"	"The Pride Of Providence"
Hometown	Newbridge, Wales, UK	Providence, Rhode Island, U.S.
Pre-fight record	42–0 (31 KOs)	26–3 (12 KOs)
Age	35 years	26 years, 4 months
Height	6 ft 0 in (183 cm)	5 ft 10 in (178 cm)
Weight	167 3/4 lb (76 kg)	166 lb (75 kg)
Style	Southpaw	Orthodox
Recognition	WBO and The Ring; Super Middleweight Champion; The Ring No. 8 ranked pound-for-pound fighter	WBO; No. 6 Ranked Super Middleweight; The Ring; No. 10 Ranked Super Middleweight

Result
- Calzaghe wins via 3rd-round TKO

Joe Calzaghe vs. Peter Manfredo Jr., billed as Pride Under Pressure, was a professional boxing match contested on 7 April 2007, for the WBO and The Ring super middleweight championship. The bout took place at Millennium Stadium, with Calzaghe winning by technical knockout in the third round.

== Background ==
Calzaghe vacated the IBF title he won against Lacy, instead of facing mandatory challenger, Robert Stieglitz, in order to make a voluntary defence against Manfredo. Manfredo's rise up the ranks came as a result of competing in the first season of The Contender.

On 27 November 2006, it was announced that Calzaghe and Manfredo would fight on 3 March 2007 at Millennium Stadium in Cardiff, live on ITV Sport and HBO. The fight was rescheduled to 7 April due to a Six Nations Rugby match between Wales and England on 17 March.

== Fight details ==
In the opening two rounds, Calzaghe landed scoring shots and quick combinations, with Manfredo boxing at range defensively and attempting to counterpunch. In the third, Calzaghe connected with a series of punches to Manfredo' head and body, sending him back against the ropes, it was at this point that the referee waved the fight off, therefore giving Calzaghe the win by TKO.

== Aftermath ==
In the post-fight interview, both Calzaghe and Manfredo said they felt the stoppage was premature.

Calzaghe defeated Kessler on 3 November, by unanimous decision to unify the WBA, WBC, WBO, and The Ring titles.

== Fight card ==
Confirmed bouts:

Weight Class		vs.		Method	Round	Time	Notes
Super-middleweight	Joe Calzaghe (c)	def.	Peter Manfredo Jr.	TKO	3/12	1:30	^{Note 1}
Welterweight	Michael Jennings	def.	Merdad Takaloo (c)	UD	12/12		^{Note 2}
Cruiserweight	Enzo Maccarinelli (c)	def.	Bobby Gunn	TKO	1/12	2:35	^{Note 3}
Light-middleweight	Bradley Pryce (c)	def.	Thomas Awimbono	UD	12		^{Note 4}
Middleweight	Gary Lockett (c)	def.	Lee Blundell	TKO	3/12	1:35	^{Note 5}
Welterweight	Tony Doherty (c)	def.	Taz Jones	TKO	7/10	2:15	^{Note 6}
Light-welterweight	Amir Khan	def.	Stefy Bull	TKO	3/8	1:45
Welterweight	Kell Brook	def.	Karl David	TKO	3/8	2:58
Super-middleweight	Nathan Cleverly	def.	Nick Okoth	PTS	8/8
Lightweight	Gavin Rees	def.	Billy Smith	PTS	6/6
Welterweight	Barrie Jones	def.	Daniel Thorpe	TKO	2/6	2:29
Middleweight	Kerry Hope	def.	Jamie Ambler	PTS	6/6
Flyweight	Don Broadhurst	def.	Delroy Spencer	PTS	4/4
Super-middleweight	Kenny Anderson	def.	Jorge Gomez	TKO	3/4	1:22
Heavyweight	Derek Chisora	def.	Tony Booth	PTS	4/4

^Note 1 For WBO and The Ring super-middleweight titles
^Note 2 For WBU welterweight title
^Note 3 For WBO cruiserweight title
^Note 4 For Commonwealth light-middleweight title
^Note 5 For WBU middleweight title
^Note 6 For Celtic welterweight title

== Broadcasting ==
Country	Broadcasters	
Country	Free-to-air	Cable/Pay TV
United Kingdom	ITV Sport	—N/a
United States	—N/a	HBO

Preceded by vs. Sakio Bika	Joe Calzaghe's bouts 7 April 2007	Succeeded by vs. Mikkel Kessler
Preceded by vs. Joey Spina	Peter Manfredo Jr.'s bouts 7 April 2007	Succeeded by vs. Ted Muller
