= Paul McCloskey =

Irish boxer (born 1979)

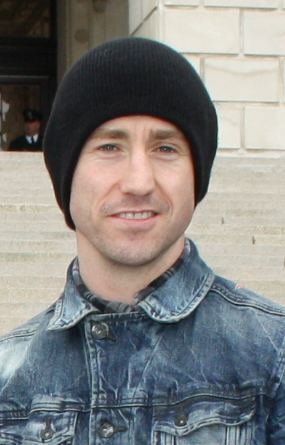
- McCloskey in 2012

Personal information
- Nickname: Dudey
- Born: 3 August 1979 (age 47) Dungiven, Northern Ireland
- Height: 5 ft 8 1/2 in (174 cm)
- Weight: Light-welterweight

Boxing career
- Reach: 70 in (178 cm)
- Stance: Southpaw

Boxing record
- Total fights: 27
- Wins: 24
- Win by KO: 12
- Losses: 3
Medal record
Men's amateur boxing
Representing Ireland
EU Championships
Silver medal – second place	2003 Strasbourg	Welterweight

Paul McCloskey (born 3 August 1979) is a former professional boxer from Northern Ireland who competed from 2005 to 2013. He held the British super-lightweight title from 2008 to 2009; the European super-lightweight title from 2009 to 2011; and challenged once for the WBA super-lightweight title in 2011. As an amateur, McCloskey won a silver medal in the welterweight division at the 2003 European Union Championships, and was an Irish Senior amateur champion.

== Gaelic games ==
McCloskey played both Gaelic football and hurling at underage and briefly at senior level for the local clubs in Dungiven – St. Canice's Dungiven and Kevin Lynch's respectively. He was part of the Dungiven side that won the Derry Senior Football Championship and Ulster Senior Club Football Championship in 1997.

== Amateur career ==
McCloskey boxed out of the St. Canices ABC and fought for Ireland at amateur level and was a three-time Irish champion and five-time senior Ulster champion in the light welterweight division. He failed to qualify for the 2004 Summer Olympics by ending up in third place at the 2nd AIBA European 2004 Olympic Qualifying Tournament in Warsaw, Poland.

== Professional career ==
McCloskey turned professional in March 2005 on the undercard of a bill that included Eamonn Magee and Neil Sinclair at the King's Hall, Belfast. In his debut McCloskey defeated experienced Englishman "Dangerous" David Kehoe with a third-round knockout.

In December 2007 he won the IBF International light-welterweight title, stopping Tontcho Tontchev in round four.

After beating Nigel Wright on points in July 2008, he fought Colin Lynes on 5 December 2008 for the vacant British light-welterweight title. McCloskey won, forcing Lynes to retire after the ninth round.

Following his British title victory, McCloskey was named Boxer of the Year at the Irish National Boxing Awards in January 2009.

On 13 March, McCloskey retained his British light-welterweight title in emphatic fashion with a fourth-round stoppage of Dean Harrison in Widnes.

McCloskey won the vacant European light welterweight title on 6 November 2009, when he defeated Spanish boxer Daniel Rasilla after original opponent and champion Mbaye withdrew due to injury.

McCloskey defended his European title against Giuseppe Lauri from Italy on 11 June at the Kings Hall, Belfast, with an 11th-round knockout.

McCloskey's next defence of his European title was against Barry Morrison in Letterkenny, County Donegal, on 2 October 2010. McCloskey won the fight with a seventh round stoppage of his Scottish opponent.

His third defence of the title would've been against second Italian challenger, Michele Di Rocco on 5 March 2011. Michele Di Rocco has a record of (21–1–1) with 12 kos and his only loss was by knockout in the 7th round against Giuseppe Lauri, whom McCloskey knocked out in the 11th round. But this match has been cancelled due to the Khan fight being worked out.

=== McCloskey vs. Khan ===
He was defeated by Amir Khan at the Manchester Evening News Arena on Saturday 16 April 2011 when the fight was stopped in the sixth round. This was the result of an accidental head clash which left McCloskey with a cut above his eye.

=== McCloskey vs. Prescott ===
McCloskey won his fight against Breidis Prescott in a world title eliminator on 10 September 2011 by unanimous decision, with two judges scoring the bout 114–113, and the third judge scoring it 115–113. During the fight Prescott dominated the early rounds, scoring a knockdown in the first round by clearly pushing his with his forearm and later breaking McCloskey nose which bleed heavily throughout the fight. However, McCloskey rallied in the second half of the fight and won the later rounds. The decision proved to be controversial with many believing Prescott had done enough to win.

== Professional boxing record ==
27 fights	24 wins	3 losses
By knockout	12	1
By decision	12	2

No.	Result	Record	Opponent	Type	Round, time	Date	Location	Notes
27	Loss	24–3	Dave Ryan	PTS	8	21 Dec 2013	First Direct Arena, Leeds, England	
26	Win	24–2	Manuel Pérez	UD	12	22 Sep 2012	Odyssey Arena, Belfast, Northern Ireland	Won vacant WBA Inter-Continental light-welterweight title
25	Loss	23–2	DeMarcus Corley	TKO	10 (12), 2:28	5 May 2012	King's Hall, Belfast, Northern Ireland	
24	Win	23–1	Breidis Prescott	UD	12	10 Sep 2011	Odyssey Arena, Belfast, Northern Ireland	
23	Loss	22–1	Amir Khan	TD	6 (12), 2:30	16 Apr 2011	MEN Arena, Manchester, England	For WBA light-welterweight title; Unanimous TD: McCloskey cut from an accidental head clash
22	Win	22–0	Barry Morrison	TKO	7 (12), 1:28	2 Oct 2010	Regional Sports and Leisure Complex, Letterkenny, Ireland	Retained European light-welterweight title
21	Win	21–0	Giuseppe Lauri	KO	11 (12), 0:45	11 Jun 2010	King's Hall, Belfast, Northern Ireland	Retained European light-welterweight title
20	Win	20–0	Daniel Rasilla	TKO	9 (12), 2:15	6 Nov 2009	Meadowbank Sports Arena, Magherafelt, Northern Ireland	Won vacant European light-welterweight title
19	Win	19–0	Dean Harrison	TKO	4 (12), 1:50	13 Mar 2009	Kingsway Leisure Centre, Widnes, England	Retained British light-welterweight title
18	Win	18–0	Colin Lynes	RTD	9 (12)	5 Dec 2008	Goresbrook Leisure Centre, London, England	Won vacant British light-welterweight title
17	Win	17–0	Nigel Wright	PTS	10	19 Jul 2008	University Arena, Limerick, Ireland	
16	Win	16–0	César Bazán	PTS	10	29 Mar 2008	Regional Sports and Leisure Complex, Letterkenny, Ireland	
15	Win	15–0	Manuel Garnica	PTS	10	2 Feb 2008	University Arena, Limerick, Ireland	
14	Win	14–0	Tontcho Tontchev	TKO	4 (12), 2:46	8 Dec 2007	King's Hall, Belfast, Northern Ireland	Won vacant IBF International light-welterweight title
13	Win	13–0	Dariusz Snarski	RTD	6 (8), 3:00	20 Oct 2007	National Stadium, Dublin, Ireland	
12	Win	12–0	Alfredo Di Feto	PTS	8	25 Aug 2007	The Point, Dublin, Ireland	
11	Win	11–0	Ivan Orlando Bustos	KO	4 (10), 2:03	14 Jul 2007	National Stadium, Dublin, Ireland	
10	Win	10–0	Chill John	PTS	6	17 Feb 2007	City Hall, Cork, Ireland	
9	Win	9–0	Eugen Stan	PTS	6	10 Feb 2007	Clanree Hotel, Letterkenny, Ireland	
8	Win	8–0	Silence Saheed	PTS	4	9 Dec 2006	ExCeL, London, England	
7	Win	7–0	Daniel Thorpe	RTD	3 (6)	4 Nov 2006	Kelvin Hall, Glasgow, Scotland	
6	Win	6–0	Surinder Sekhon	KO	1, 0:53	11 Mar 2006	Newport Centre, Newport, Wales	
5	Win	5–0	Duncan Cottier	PTS	6	18 Feb 2006	Meadowbank Sports Centre, Edinburgh, Scotland	
4	Win	4–0	Henry Janes	TKO	3 (4), 2:31	24 Nov 2005	Sports Bar, Lurgan, Northern Ireland	
3	Win	3–0	Billy Smith	PTS	4	5 Nov 2005	Braehead Arena, Glasgow, Scotland	
2	Win	2–0	Oscar Milkitas	PTS	4	17 Jun 2005	Kelvin Hall, Glasgow, Scotland	
1	Win	1–0	David Kehoe	TKO	3 (4), 0:10	18 Mar 2005	King's Hall, Belfast, Northern Ireland	

Sporting positions
Regional boxing titles
Vacant Title last held by Giorgio Marinelli	IBF International light-welterweight champion 8 December 2007 – November 2008; Vacated	Vacant Title next held by Dmitry Salita
Vacant Title last held by David Barnes	British light-welterweight champion 5 December 2008 – June 2009; Vacated	Vacant Title next held by Ajose Olusegun
Vacant Title last held by Souleymane M'baye	European light-welterweight champion 6 November 2009 – April 2011; Vacated	Vacant Title next held by Denis Shafikov
Vacant Title last held by Lucas Matthysse	WBA Inter-Continental light-welterweight champion 22 September 2012 – December 2013; Vacated	Vacant Title next held by Eduard Troyanovsky
