= Chris Saunders (boxer) =

British former boxer (born 1969)

Personal information
- Nationality: British
- Born: 15 August 1969 (age 56) Barnsley, England
- Height: 5 ft 8 in (173 cm)
- Weight: Welterweight

Boxing career

Boxing record
- Total fights: 47
- Wins: 23
- Win by KO: 10
- Losses: 23
- Draws: 1

Chris Saunders (born 15 August 1969) is a British former boxer who was British welterweight champion between 1995 and 1996.

== Career ==
Born in Barnsley, Saunders made his professional debut in February 1990 with a points win over Malcolm Melvin. He suffered his first defeat nine months later when Ross Hale took a six-round points decision. In February 1992 he unsuccessfully challenged for the BBBofC Central Area super lightweight title.

He moved up to welterweight, and after inflicting the first defeat of Kevin Lueshing's career in March 1994 he beat Jose Varela three months later. After further wins over Julian Eavis, Lindon Scarlett, and Roberto Welin, he challenged for Del Bryan's British title in September 1995. The fight went the distance, with Saunders taking a points decision to become British champion. He made his first defence in February 1996 against Lueshing, who stopped him in the third round. According to referee Mickey Vann, "this one was war. It lasted about seven minutes, with an average of one knock-down per minute". It was voted British fight of the year.

Saunders lost his next four fights, losing to Derek Roche, Scott Dixon, and twice to Michael Carruth. After being out of the ring since the second defeat to Carruth in April 1999 he returned in December 2001 with a win over David Kirk. After winning his next three fights he beat Marcus Portman via a first round stoppage in April 2004 to take the English welterweight title. He defended the title in October against the unbeaten Michael Jennings, retiring in the fifth round.

Saunders career appeared to be over but in 2007 he returned to the ring for his final two fights.
