= Paul Ryan (boxer) =

Irish boxer

Personal information
- Nickname: Scrap Iron
- Nationality: Irish
- Born: 2 February 1965 (age 61) Dublin, Ireland
- Height: 5 ft 8 in (1.73 m)
- Weight: light welter/welter/light middleweight

Boxing career
- Stance: Southpaw

Boxing record
- Total fights: 28
- Wins: 25 (KO 23)
- Losses: 3 (KO 3)

Paul "Scrap Iron" Ryan (born 2 February 1965) is an Irish professional light welter/welter/light middleweight boxer of the 1990s who won the World Boxing Organization (WBO) Inter-Continental light welterweight title, British Boxing Board of Control (BBBofC) British light welterweight title, and Commonwealth light welterweight title, and was a challenger for the BBBofC British welterweight title against Geoff McCreesh, his professional fighting weight varied from 136 lb (62 kg; 9 st 10 lb), i.e. light welterweight to 148 3/4 lb (67.5 kg; 10 st 8.8 lb), i.e. light middleweight.
