= Antonin Décarie =

Canadian boxer (born 1982)

Personal information
- Nationality: Canadian
- Born: December 2, 1983 (age 42) Laval, Quebec
- Height: 175 cm (5 ft 9 in)
- Weight: Welterweight

Boxing career
- Stance: Orthodox

Boxing record
- Total fights: 33
- Wins: 31
- Win by KO: 10
- Losses: 2
- Draws: 0
- No contests: 0

Antonin Décarie (born 2 December 1982) is a Canadian former professional boxer. He was signed to Eye of the Tiger Management and trained by Marc Ramsay. He went 31-2 as a professional.

== Amateur career ==
Décarie started boxing at age 14, following the example of his step-father before him. He then proceeded to numerous national and international fights over the years. Décarie boxed in the 2002 Commonwealth Games, 2003 Pan American Games and he was lightweight Canadian champion in 2001, 2002 and 2004.

== Professional career ==
Décarie turned professional in 2005. He won the NABF welterweight title in 2012, following a technical knockout over Alex Perez. The fight was broadcast on Boxing After Dark from HBO. However, he lost his next fight by unanimous decision to Luis Carlos Abregu. The confrontation, which took place at José Amalfitani Stadium in Buenos Aires, was for the vacant WBC Silver welterweight title.

== Professional boxing record ==
31 wins (10 knockouts), 2 losses, 0 draws, 0 no contests
Res.	Record	Opponent	Type	Round	Date	Location	Notes
Win	31-2	(Mexico) Ivan Pereyra	TKO	5 (10)	2014-09-27	(Canada) Bell Centre, Montreal	
Win	30-2	(Mexico) Pablo Munguia	UD	10	2014-03-28	(Canada) Lac Leamy Casino, Gatineau, Quebec	
Win	29-2	(Mexico) César Chávez	TKO	2 (8)	2014-02-05	(Canada) New City Gas, Montréal, Quebec	
Win	28-2	(France) Salim Larbi	UD	6	2013-09-28	(Canada) Bell Centre, Montréal, Quebec	
Loss	27-2	(Argentina) Luis Carlos Abregu	UD	10	2013-04-27	(Argentina) José Amalfitani Stadium, Buenos Aires, Buenos Aires Province	For vacant WBC Silver welterweight title
Win	27-1	(United States) Alex Perez	TKO	6 (10)	2012-09-29	(United States) MGM Grand at Foxwoods Resort, Mashantucket, Connecticut	Won vacant WBC-NABF welterweight title
Win	26-1	(Romania) Victor Lupo Puiu	UD	12	2011-12-17	(Canada) Colisée Pepsi, Quebec City, Quebec	Won vacant WBC International welterweight title
Win	25-1	(United States) Shamone Alvarez	UD	10	2011-02-11	(Canada) Bell Centre, Montréal, Quebec	
Win	24-1	(Puerto Rico) Irving Garcia	MD	10	2010-10-29	(Canada) Bell Centre, Montréal, Quebec	
Loss	23-1	(France) Souleymane M'baye	UD	12	2010-05-28	(France) Palais des Sport Marcel Cerdan, Levallois-Perret, Hauts-de-Seine	For vacant interim WBA welterweight title
Win	23-0	(United States) Terrance Cauthen	TKO	10 (10)	2009-10-03	(Canada) Montreal Casino, Montréal, Quebec	
Win	22-0	(Argentina) Victor Hugo Castro	UD	12	2009-06-06	(Canada) Montreal Casino, Montréal, Quebec	Retained WBO NABO welterweight title
Win	21-0	(United States) Dorin Spivey	UD	12	2009-01-30	(Canada) Bell Centre, Montréal, Quebec	Retained WBO NABO welterweight title
Win	20-0	(United States) Hector Munoz	TKO	12 (12)	2008-10-04	(Canada) Montreal Casino, Montréal, Quebec	Retained WBO NABO welterweight title
Win	19-0	(United States) Brian Camechis	UD	12	2008-05-03	(Canada) Montreal Casino, Montréal, Quebec	Won vacant WBO NABO welterweight title
Win	18-0	(United States) Israel Cardona	UD	10	2008-02-09	(Canada) Montreal Casino, Montréal, Quebec	
Win	17-0	(Argentina) Andres Pablo Villafane	UD	8	2007-12-01	(Canada) Montreal Casino, Montréal, Quebec	
Win	16-0	(Mexico) Frankie Zepeda	UD	8	2007-11-10	(Canada) Montreal Casino, Montréal, Quebec	
Win	15-0	(United States) Aaron Drake	UD	6	2007-06-08	(Canada) Uniprix Stadium, Montréal, Quebec	
Win	14-0	(Argentina) Ivan Orlando Bustos	DQ	2 (10)	2007-04-14	(Canada) Montreal Casino, Montréal, Quebec	
Win	13-0	(Mexico) José Leónardo Corona	UD	8	2007-01-26	(Canada) Bell Centre, Montréal, Quebec	
Win	12-0	(Peru) Leonardo Rojas	UD	10	2006-11-03	(Canada) Marcel Dionne Arena, Drummondville, Quebec	Won vacant Canada light welterweight title
Win	11-0	(Mexico) Jose Luis Alvarez	TKO	2 (6)	2006-09-15	(Canada) Bell Centre, Montréal, Quebec	
Win	10-0	(Mexico) Ulises Jimenez	MD	6	2006-06-02	(Canada) Melançon Arena, Saint-Jérôme, Quebec	
Win	9-0	(Mexico) Jose Manjarrez	UD	6	2006-05-16	(Canada) Bell Centre, Montréal, Quebec	
Win	8-0	(United States) Ronny Glover	TKO	1 (4)	2006-04-21	(United States) Augusta-Richmond County Civic Center, Augusta, Georgia	
Win	7-0	(Mexico) Ulises Duarte	RTD	4 (6)	2006-03-24	(Canada) Bell Centre, Montréal, Quebec	
Win	6-0	(Ivory Coast) Bakary Sako	UD	8	2006-03-03	(Canada) Salle Antoine-Labelle, Laval, Quebec	
Win	5-0	(Canada) Amadou Diallo	UD	6	2005-12-02	(Canada) Bell Centre, Montréal, Quebec	
Win	4-0	(Mexico) Ulises Cervantes	TKO	1 (4)	2005-09-16	(Canada) Bell Centre, Montréal, Quebec	
Win	3-0	(Canada) Stephane Savage	UD	4	2005-06-03	(Canada) Maurice Richard Arena, Montréal, Quebec	
Win	2-0	(Trinidad and Tobago) Michael Springer	UD	4	2005-03-18	(Canada) Bell Centre, Montréal, Quebec	
Win	1-0	(The Bahamas) Deon Sweeting	TKO	1 (4)	2005-02-19	(Canada) Pavillon de la Jeunesse, Quebec City, Quebec	
