= Lenny Daws =

English boxer

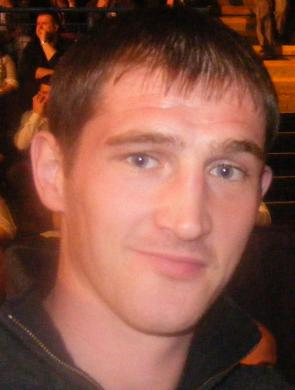

Personal information
- Nationality: British
- Born: Lenny Daws; 29 December 1978 (age 47) Carshalton, London, England
- Height: 5 ft 10 1/2 in (179 cm)
- Weight: Light welterweight

Boxing career
- Stance: Orthodox

Boxing record
- Total fights: 37
- Wins: 30
- Win by KO: 11
- Losses: 5
- Draws: 2
- No contests: 0

Lenny Daws (born 29 December 1978) is a British professional boxer. He held the British super lightweight title twice between 2006 and 2011, and the EBU European Union super lightweight title between 2012 and 2014.

== Boxing career ==
=== Early professional career ===
Daws made his professional debut on 16 April 2003, defeating Danny Gwilym at the Ice Arena in Nottingham. Over next few years he compiled a record of twelve consecutive victories with wins over the likes of Ernie Smith, Karl Taylor and Oscar Hall. On 12 May 2006, he defeated Colin Lynes at the York Hall in Bethnal Green to win the Southern Area light welterweight title. The fight also served as an eliminator for the full British title.

=== British champion ===
Daws fought for the British belt on 12 May 2006, in his very next fight. The contest, once again held at the York Hall, saw Daws defeat Northumbrian boxer Nigel Wright via a 12 round points decision. The new champions reign was however to be short lived with the first defence of the title also resulting in a first defeat. Daws lost the belt to Scotsman, Barry Morrison at the Alexandra Palace in Wood Green, this time by split decision with one judge scoring widely in Daws favour with the other two scoring narrowly to Morrison.

=== Road back to contention ===
Following the Morrison defeat, Daws returned to action in May 2007 with a win over Billy Smith and then challenged former opponent Nigel Wright for Wright's English title on 14 November 2007. The contest with Wright again took place at the York Hall and resulted in a draw meaning that Wright retained the belt. He went on to win three more fights before getting another chance to fight for the English title. His chance came on 11 April 2009, and claimed the belt with a win over Peter McDonagh the Southern Area champion. The win gave Daws the opportunity to challenge Ajose Olusegun for his old British title, before Olusegun vacated the belt choosing to fight in an eliminator for the WBC light welterweight instead. This meant that Daws opponent in the other corner for the vacant belt would now be old foe Barry Morrison in a contest to take place on 18 September 2009. The fight itself, at the York Hall once more, saw Daws regain the belt he lost to Morrison and gain revenge over the only man to have beaten him with a 10th round stoppage.

=== Two time British Champion ===
The win over Morrison propelled Daws back to the top of the domestic scene as holder of the British light welterweight title. His first defence was against Welshman Jason Cook on 2 February 2010. Cook, a former European lightweight champion, had taken some time away from the sport only to bounce back and reach the semi-final of the Prizefighter light welterweight tournament. Despite being rocked in the first round Daws did enough to retain the title via a draw with all three judges scoring closely. Daws next defence was held on 9 July 2010 against English champion Steve Williams, Daws retained for the second time after Williams sustained two cuts on his eye which forced his corner to pull him out. On 19 February 2011, in his third defence of the title, Daws lost the belt to Ashley Theophane at the Wembley Arena. Despite taking control in the first half of the fight, Theophane came on strong in the second half and knocked Daws down twice in the 9th round to run out an eventual winner over 12 rounds.

== Professional boxing record ==
37 fights	30 wins	5 losses
By knockout	11	0
By decision	19	4
By disqualification	0	1
Draws	2	

No.	Result	Record	Opponent	Type	Round, time	Date	Location	Notes
37	Loss	30–5–2	Anthony Yigit	UD	12	11 Dec 2011	Westcroft Leisure Centre, London, England	For vacant European light-welterweight title
36	Loss	30–4–2	Ruben Nieto	DQ	10 (12), 0:56	5 Dec 2015	Westcroft Leisure Centre, London, England]	For vacant European light-welterweight title; Daws was duly disqualified for what the referee saw was an intentional head-butt
35	Win	30–3–2	Mikhail Avakian	PTS	8	25 Jul 2015	Derby Arena, Derby, England	
34	Win	29–3–2	Chaquib Fadli	TKO	10 (12), 2:51	8 Nov 2014	Bluewater Glow, Greenhithe, England	Won vacant European Union light-welterweight title
33	Win	28–3–2	Sylwester Walczak	PTS	8	10 May 2014	Ponds Forge Arena, Sheffield, England	
32	Win	27–3–2	Arek Malek	PTS	8	15 Mar 2014	Rivermead Leisure Centre, Reading, England	
31	Win	26–3–2	Tony Pace	PTS	6	16 Nov 2013	Bluewater Glow, Greenhithe, England	
30	Loss	25–3–2	Michele di Rocco	UD	12	8 Jun 2013	Palazzetto dello sport Elio Pentassuglia, Brindisi, Italy	For vacant European light-welterweight title
29	Win	25–2–2	Ville Piispanen	UD	12	13 Oct 2012	Bluewater Glow, Greenhithe, England	Won vacant European Union light-welterweight title
28	Win	24–2–2	Dean Mills	TKO	7 (8), 0:39	7 Jul 2012	Hand Arena, Clevedon, English	
27	Win	23–2–2	Chris Truman	PTS	8	18 Feb 2012	Magna Centre, Rotherham, England	
26	Win	22–2–2	Stuart Green	PTS	6	12 Nov 2011	Event City, Manchester, England	
25	Loss	21–2–2	Ashley Theophane	UD	12	19 Feb 2011	Wembley Arena, London, England	Lost British light-welterweight title
24	Win	21–1–2	Stevie Williams	RTD	10 (12), 3:00	9 Jul 2010	York Hall, London, England	Retained British light-welteweight title
23	Draw	20–1–2	Jason Cook	SD	12	12 Feb 2010	York Hall, London, England	Retained British light-welterweight title
22	Win	20–1–1	Barry Morrison	KO	10 (12), 1:30	18 Sep 2009	York Hall, London, England	Won vacant British light-welterweight title
21	Win	19–1–1	Peter McDonagh	PTS	10	11 Apr 2009	York Hall, London, England	Won vacant English light-welterweight title
20	Win	18–1–1	Sergejs Savrinovics	TKO	6 (10), 2:37	17 Jan 2009	Robin Park Centre, Wigan, England	
19	Win	17–1–1	Jay Morris	PTS	6	8 Nov 2008	York Hall, London, England	
18	Win	16–1–1	Mihăiță Mutu	PTS	10	27 Jun 2008	York Hall, London, England	
17	Draw	15–1–1	Nigel Wright	PTS	10	14 Nov 2007	York Hall, London, England	For English light-welterweight title
16	Win	15–1	Billy Smith	PTS	6	18 May 2007	ExCel Arena, London, England	
15	Loss	14–1	Barry Morrison	SD	12	20 Jan 2007	Alexandra Palace, London, England	Lost British light-welterweight title
14	Win	14–0	Nigel Wright	UD	12	12 May 2006	York Hall, London, England	Won vacant British light-welterweight title
13	Win	13–0	Colin Lynes	TKO	9 (12)	20 Jan 2006	York Hall, London, England	Won vacant Southern Area light-welterweight title
12	Win	12–0	Oscar Hall	RTD	7 (10), 3:00	28 Oct 2005	Borough Hall, Hartlepool, England	
11	Win	11–0	Ivor Bonavic	PTS	6	9 Jul 2005	Nottingham Arena, Nottingham, England	
10	Win	10–0	Silence Saheed	PTS	6	10 Apr 2005	Brentwood Centre, Brentwood, England	
9	Win	9–0	Keith Jones	PTS	8	12 Nov 2004	Conference Centre, London, England	
8	Win	8–0	Ernie Smith	PTS	6	24 Sep 2004	Nottingham Arena, Nottingham, England	
7	Win	7–0	Deniss Aleksejevs	KO	3 (6), 2:12	20 Jan 2004	Goresbrook Leisure Centre, London, England	
6	Win	6–0	Keith Jones	PTS	8	11 Dec 2003	York Hall, London, England	
5	Win	5–0	Tony Montana	PTS	6	28 Nov 2003	Derby Storm Arena, Derby, England	
4	Win	4–0	Ernie Smith	PTS	4	4 Oct 2003	Alexandra Palace, London, England	
3	Win	3–0	Karl Taylor	RTD	2 (6), 3:00	25 Jul 2003	Sports Village, Norwich, England	
2	Win	2–0	Ben Hudson	TKO	2 (4), 2:42	27 May 2003	Goresbrook Leisure Centre, London, England	
1	Win	1–0	Danny Gwilym	TKO	2 (6)	16 Apr 2003	Nottingham Arena, Nottingham, England	
