= Geoff McCreesh =

Personal information
- Nickname: Unleashed
- Nationality: English
- Born: 12 June 1970 (age 56) Stockton on tees, Cleveland, England
- Height: 5 ft 10 in (178 cm)
- Weight: Welterweight, Light middleweight

Boxing career
- Reach: 72 in (183 cm)

Boxing record
- Total fights: 35
- Wins: 27
- Win by KO: 9
- Losses: 8
- Draws: 0

Geoff McCreesh (born 12 June 1970) is an English former boxer who won the British welterweight title in 1997 and went on to fight for European and World titles.

== Career ==
Born in Billingham, Stockton on Tees and based in Bracknell, McCreesh had a moderately successful amateur career before turning professional, winning three Home Counties ABA title between 1989 and 1991, and reaching the ABA final only to be beaten by Joe Calzaghe. In 1990 his ABA quarter final against Robert McCracken in Birmingham ended prematurely when he was disqualified for leaving the ring to join in a brawl that had started among the two fighters' families.

McCreesh made his professional debut in February 1994, beating fellow debutante Tony Walton on points. After winning his first seven fights he beat Clay O'Shea in January 1995 to take the vacant BBBofC Southern Area light middleweight title. He suffered his first professional defeat in his next fight two months later, retiring in the fifth round against Dennis Berry after suffering a broken hand. Further losses (both via disqualification) followed to Michael Smyth and Steve Goodwin, before he returned to winning ways in March 1996 with a points win over Peter Varnavas. A run of eight straight wins, including a second round knockout of former World lightweight champion Dingaan Thobela, was ended by defeat to Peter Malinga in January 1997.

In July 1997, only a month after his mother was killed and his father seriously injured in a car crash, he successfully challenged Kevin Lueshing for the British welterweight title, stopping the defending champion in the tenth round. He successfully defended the title two months later, stopping Paul Ryan in the second round. Also in 1997 McCreesh sparred with Daniel Day-Lewis as part of the actor's preparation for the film The Boxer.

In November 1997 he faced Michele Piccirillo for the vacant European welterweight title; Piccirillo stopped him in the ninth round.

McCreesh made a second successful defence of his British title in July 1998, stopping Michael Smyth in the seventh round, the fight marred by serious crowd trouble that led to four arrests, and won his third defence three months later, stopping Ross Hale in the fourth. He relinquished the title in 1999 and moved up to super welterweight.

In July 2000 he challenged Adrian Stone for the latter's IBO World super welterweight title, but was stopped in the sixth round.

McCreesh had one further fight, a points defeat to Ossie Duran in April 2001, before retiring.

McCreesh went on to take over Bracknell Boxing Academy, coaching young boxers.

In 2012 he returned to the ring to fight Tony Furzer, losing by a fifth round TKO.
