= Laatekwei Hammond =

Ghanaian boxer

Laatekwei Hammond (born 1 August 1980 in Ghana) is a professional welterweight boxer. Hammond was a three-weight national champion of Ghana, winning the lightweight, light welterweight, and welterweight titles as well as the World Boxing Association and World Boxing Organisation's African titles.

Hammond unsuccessfully competed for the Commonwealth title in Liverpool, England. He faced Bobby Vanzie for the Commonwealth Lightweight Title. Hammond dropped Vanzie twice and was on his way to victory before being stopped by Vanzie in the eighth round with a right-handed punch that ended the contest.

Hammond bounced back with another title victory over Stephen Okine, winning his national title at light welterweight which led to another shot at the Commonwealth title in England. This time he challenged Junior Witter for the Commonwealth light welterweight title in London, before successfully winning both the WBA and the WBO African titles in his home city of Accra.

Following his victories in World Boxing Association and World Boxing Organisation African title wins, Hammond was ranked among the world's the top 15 middleweight boxers by WBO.
