= Kevin Lueshing =

English boxer

Personal information
- Nickname: The Look
- Nationality: British
- Born: 17 April 1968 (age 58)
- Height: 5 ft 11 in (180 cm)
- Weight: Welterweight, super welterweight

Boxing career
- Reach: 70 in (178 cm)

Boxing record
- Total fights: 25
- Wins: 21
- Win by KO: 17
- Losses: 4
- Draws: 0

Kevin Lueshing (born 17 April 1968) is a British former boxer who was British welterweight champion between 1996 and 1997 and three times fought for world titles, winning the IBO World welterweight title in 1996.

== Career ==
From Beckenham, London, Kevin Lueshing made his professional debut in September 1991 with a second round stoppage of John McGlynn at the Royal Albert Hall. After winning his first ten fights he faced Kirkland Laing in June 1993 for the vacant BBBofC Southern Area super welterweight title, stopping Laing in the fifth round.

He suffered his first defeat in March 1994 when Chris Saunders stopped him in the fourth. He won his next five fights leading to a challenge for Saunders' British welterweight title in February 1996. Lueshing stopped Saunders in the third round to become British champion.

After stopping Paul King in two rounds in June he challenged for Nino Cirilo's IBO World welterweight title in New York in July 1996. Lueshing stopped Cirilo in the second round to take the title.

Now based in New York, his next fight was against the unbeaten Félix Trinidad for the latter's IBF World welterweight title at the Nashville Arena in January 1997. Although Lueshing had Trinidad down in the second round, Trinidad stopped him in the third to retain the title.

In July 1997 he made the first defence of his British title against Geoff McCreesh at Wembley Arena. McCreesh stopped him in the tenth round to take the title.

He had two fights in 1998, wins over Benji Singleton and Nicky Thurbin, the latter for the WBO intercontinental light-middleweight title. In 1999 he challenged for Harry Simon's WBO World super welterweight title. The fight, in May 1999 at the National Sports Centre, Crystal Palace, ended with Simon stopping Lueshing in the third round, and proved to be Lueshing's final fight.

He returned to live in England and went on to become a boxing agent, his clients including Nigel Benn.

In 2016 his autobiographical book The Belt Boy was published, detailing his troubled early life including the physical and sexual abuse he received as a child, and resulting suicide attempts, and how boxing changed his life.
