= Fife Ice Arena =

Ice sports venue in Fife, Scotland

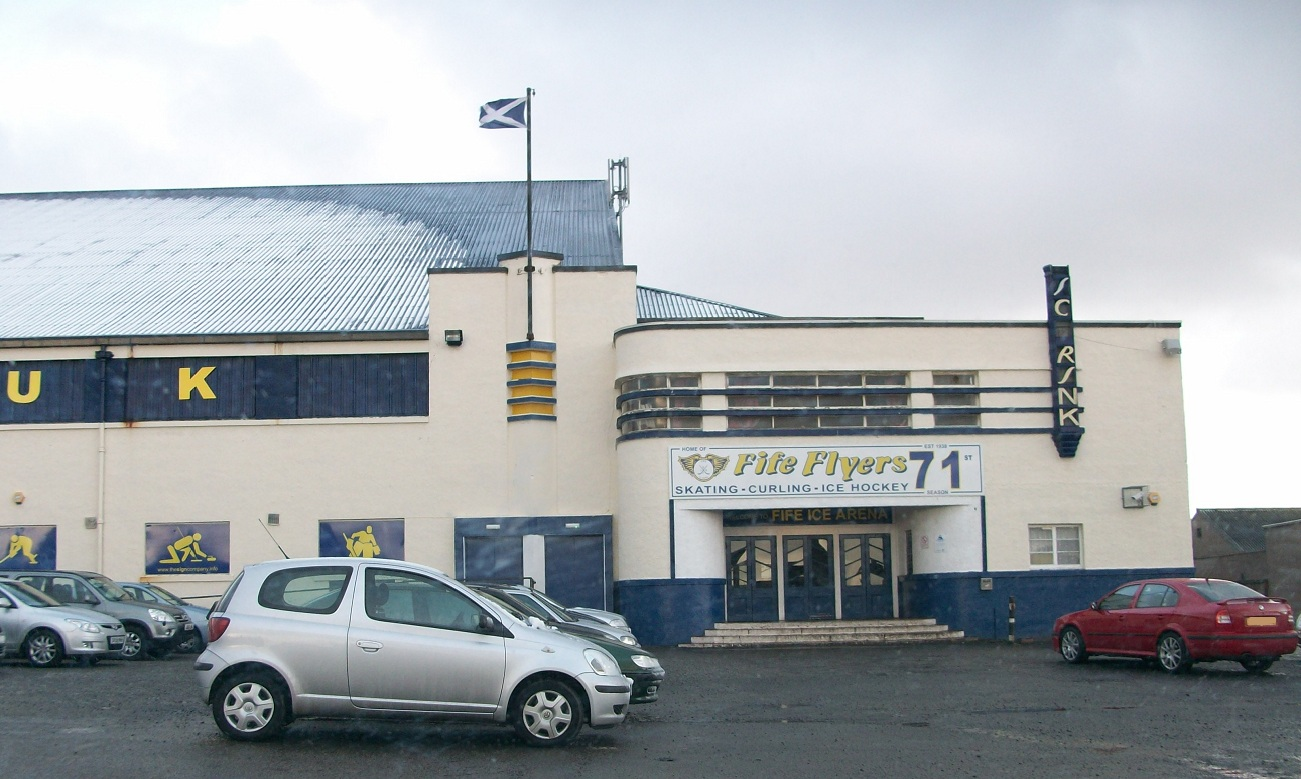
- Interactive map of Fife Ice Arena
- Former names: Kirkcaldy Ice Rink
- Location: Rosslyn Street, Kirkcaldy, Fife, Scotland, KY1 3HS
- Coordinates: 56°7′57″N 3°8′4″W
- Owner: Kirkcaldy Ice Rink Limited
- Capacity: Ice Hockey: 3525

Listed Building – Category B
- Official name: Rosslyn Street, Fife Ice Arena Including Gate Piers And Quadrant Walls
- Designated: 5 November 2013
- Reference no.: LB52112

Construction
- Built: 1937
- Opened: 1938
- Architect: Williamson & Hubbard

Tenant
- Fife Flyers (Elite Ice Hockey League); Kirkcaldy Junior Ice Hockey Club; Kirkcaldy Ice Skating Club; Curling Clubs that use FIA; Kirkcaldy Curling School

Fife Ice Arena, originally known as Kirkcaldy Ice Rink, opened in 1938. The Kirkcaldy Ice Rink was designed by architects Williamson & Hubbard. Fife Ice Arena is the home venue of the oldest ice hockey team in the UK, the Fife Flyers. It is also a venue for public skating, figure skating, speed skating, curling and ice shows. The arena has also hosted concerts, boxing, wrestling, motorcycle ice speedway and other events such as dog shows.

The Fife Free Press dated 2 February 1938, announced 30,000 ordinary shares at One Pound (British pre-decimal currency) (£1) each in a proposed new rink in the town. 25,000 shares were offered for subscription. On 17 February, plans to build the rink in the Gallatown were presented to, and approved by, Kirkcaldy Dean of Guild Court. The one-storey building contained seating for 4,500 and would cost £37,000 (equivalent to £2,153,000 in 2025) to construct. To put that figure into context the town's fire station, also opened that year, cost £15,000 (equivalent to £873,000 in 2025).

The building was to have a carcass of steel stanchions and a roof span of 145 feet without any supporting pillars except those at the extremities, making it the widest construction of its kind in Scotland at the time.

The rink's ground level would consist of an entrance hall, general office, booking office, confectioners and tobacconist, cloakroom with provision for a large restaurant, and a milk bar. Facilities also included dressing rooms with spray baths, while immediately above the entrance was the boardroom, bandstand and manager's office. The plans also had a touch of class—the restaurant featured Parker-Knoll chairs, curtains designed by Dame Laura Knight, as well as monogrammed cutlery.

Much of the work was carried out by local tradesmen, including plumber James Blyth, while the original sound system came from E. Donaldson of Kirk Wynd. The builder was James Ramsay of Leslie, while joiner D. Mitchell & Sons, also of Leslie, worked on the roof.

== Location and transportation ==
Fife Ice Arena (FIA) is located on Rosslyn Street in the North East area of Kirkcaldy known as Gallatown. FIA is approximately 1 mile from the A92, 2 miles from the railway station and town centre.

- Drive: exit the A92 at the Redhouse roundabout (Kirkcaldy East & Central) and drive South on the A921 approximately 0.5 miles to the next roundabout. Follow the A921 (Town Centre) for a further 0.4 miles. Fife Ice Arena is on the right.
- Bus: FIA is served by the #37 and #39 – Kirkcaldy<>Glenrothes – bus services provided by Stagecoach East Scotland
- Train: Kirkcaldy railway station is served by train services operated by ScotRail one the Fife Circle Line. Kirkcaldy station is also served by London North Eastern Railway providing direct connections from towns and cities including Aberdeen, Dundee, Waverley, Newcastle, York and London.

== Rink managers ==
Date	Name	Notes
	Stuart Robertson	
	John Brady	
	Ronnie Herd	
1993–1994	Bob Korol	
1979–1993	Jack Dryburgh	
	Tommy Horne	Tommy was the father of Kenny Horne and grandfather of Kyle Horne
1938–	J.C. Rolland	

== Events ==
Other than league ice hockey, skating and curling, other notable events have occurred at Fife Ice Arena over the years. Some of these include, but are not limited to:

Date	Event	Notes
14 September 2007	Boxing	Kevin Anderson vs Francis Jones
27 February 2007	Fire	In the early hours of Tuesday 27 February 2007, FIA was badly damaged in a "huge fire." There were, however, no casualties involved, and there are thought to be no suspicious circumstances surrounding the blaze.
16 February 2007	Boxing	Kirkcaldy local, Kevin Anderson, British & Commonwealth welterweight champion defended his Commonwealth title, only to lose on points against Ali Nuumbembe, who was the first man to defeat the Scot in a professional ring.
11 June 2005	Boxing	Kevin Anderson vs Vladimir Borovski
21–27 April 1984	Ice Hockey	European Ice Hockey Championship (Junior) Pool C: Belgium (Junior), Great Britain (Junior), Hungary (Junior) and Spain (Junior). Games were played at Kirkcaldy Ice Rink & Murrayfield Ice Rink in Edinburgh.
6–12 December 1982	Curling	European Curling Championships: The men's championship was won by the Scottish team of Mike Hay , David Hay, David Smith, Russell Keiller, while the ladies championship was won by the Swedish team of Elisabeth Högström, Katarina Hultling, Birgitta Sewik , Karin Sjögren
10 August 1981	Concert	Thin Lizzy
1966–67	Ice Hockey	BBC Grandstand Trophy Final: Fife Flyers defeated Wembley Lions 3–2
1965–66	Ice Hockey	BBC Grandstand Trophy Final: Paisley Mohawks defeated Fife Flyers 4–1
28 March 1948	Ice Hockey	Fife Flyers 6–5 Royal Canadian Air Force. Fresh from winning the 1948 Olympic Gold medal, the RCAF (Team Canada) played a series of 35 exhibition games around Europe, one against Fife Flyers. Flyers won the game 6–5.
9 December 1947	Ice Hockey	Scotland 2–9 England
1 October 1938	Opening Game	Fife Flyers debut against Dundee Tigers, unfortunately losing the game 1–4.

== NHL/International players ==
A number of players with NHL experience have played for Fife Flyers and other British ice hockey teams. Some of the most noted players that have skated at Fife Ice Arena are:

Name	British Team(s)	NHL/International Team(s)	Notes
Garry Unger	Dundee Rockets	Toronto Maple Leafs; Detroit Red Wings; St. Louis Blues; Atlanta Flames; Los Angeles Kings; Edmonton Oilers	
Doug Smail	Fife Flyers	Winnipeg Jets; Minnesota North Stars; Quebec Nordiques; Ottawa Senators	
Al Sims	Fife Flyers	Boston Bruins; Hartford Whalers; Los Angeles Kings	
Laurie Boschman	Fife Flyers	Toronto Maple Leafs; Edmonton Oilers; Winnipeg Jets; New Jersey Devils; Ottawa Senators	
Glen Sharpley	Dundee Rockets	Minnesota North Stars; Chicago Blackhawks	
Mike Blaisdell	Durham Wasps; Nottingham Panthers; Sheffield Steelers	Detroit Red Wings; New York Rangers; Pittsburgh Penguins; Toronto Maple Leafs	
Milan Lucic	Fife Flyers	Boston Bruins; Los Angeles Kings; Edmonton Oilers; Calgary Flames	
Jindrich Kokrment	Fife Flyers	Czechoslovakia National Team	World championship and Canada cup gold medalist. Age 30 when he joined Fife Flyers. A centre who played 495 games over 14 seasons in the Czech First National League, scoring 280 goals. He joined the Czech national side in 1973, and won a gold medal at the world championships of 1985, silver in 1982 and bronze in 1981. He also took a gold medal in the Czech side which won the Canada Cup in 1981.
Milan Figala	Fife Flyers; Dumfries Border Vikings	Czechoslovakia National Team	A world championship silver medalist. Age 32 when he joined Fife Flyers. A defenceman who has played 450 games in the Czech First National League, and 90 games for the Czech National team. He was a member of the side which won the Czech 1981 national championships, and a key man in the HC Jecenica team which won the Jugoslav title. Figala was a silver medalist with the Czech side in the 1980 world championships. Sadly, Milan died 3 November 2000 after a long illness. Milan founded The Anglo-Czech Ice Hockey School which remains one of the best schools of its kind in the world.
Vincent Lukáč	Fife Flyers; Streatham Redskins	Czechoslovakia National Team	The third all time scorer in Czech international history. Age 33 when he joined Fife Flyers. a winger who has played 550 games in the Czech First National League over 14 years, scoring 390 goals. He has been a member of the Czech national side for 12 years, winning gold medals in the world championships of 1977 and 1985 (when they beat the national team of the Soviet Union in their final game), plus silver medals in 1982 and 1983.
Jaroslav Lyčka	Dundee Rockets; Lee Valley Lions	Czechoslovakia National Team	

== Improvements and upgrades ==
Over the years Fife Ice Arena has undergone many changes, upgrades and improvements to the venue including:

Year	Event	Notes
2023	Digital Scoreboard	New digital scoreboard replaced the previous scoreboard from 2011.
2011	Plexiglas	Plexiglas installed to accommodate requirements for Elite Ice Hockey League ice hockey
	Boards	
	Ice resurfacer	Olympia Ice Refurfacer powered by natural gas replacing the petrol powered Zamboni
2011	Electronic Scoreboard	The original analogue hockey clock was replaced with an electronic clock and scoreboard. See images in the gallery section.
	Seating	Original wooden seating was replaced with modern plastic seats that came from Ibrox Stadium.
	Roof	Original corrugated asbestos roof replaced
	Arena lighting	Arena lights were upgraded from incandescent lights
	Fife Lounge	Major internal construction encasing the East end stands behind a glass facade to provide a luxury area for spectators and sponsors.
	Refrigeration Plant	
1982 (TBC)	Ice resurfacer	A Zamboni replaced the tractor & plough that was used for many years to maintain the ice surface.
	Foyer	Complete reconstruction of the original foyer to create the current glass ticket office
1979 (TBC)	Rink Floor	

== Gallery ==
Original Analogue Hockey Clock

Electronic Clock & Scoreboard in use until 2023.

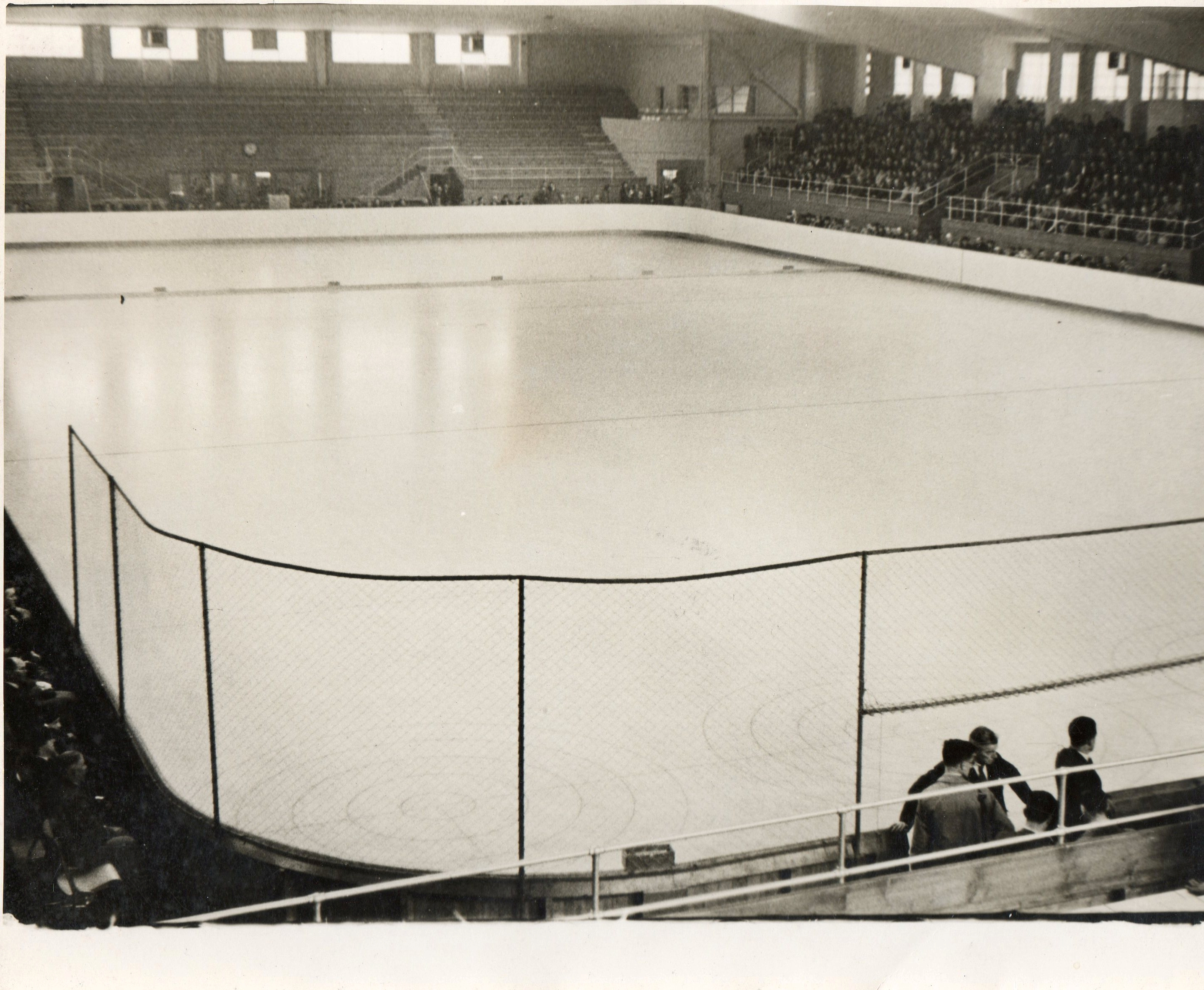
Kirkcaldy Ice Rink circa 1938

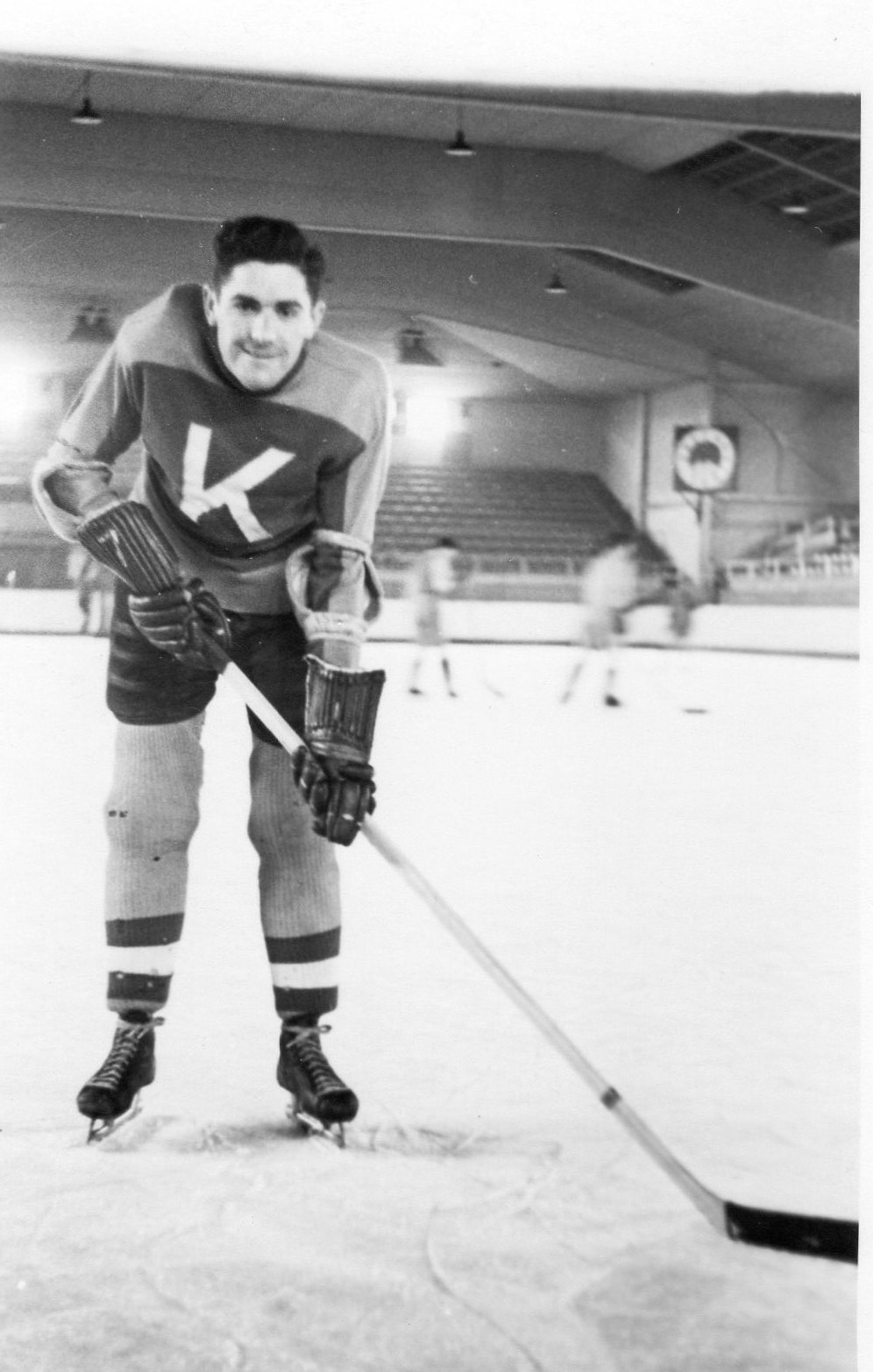
Kirkcaldy Ice Rink circa 1938 showing the Original Analogue Hockey Clock in the background

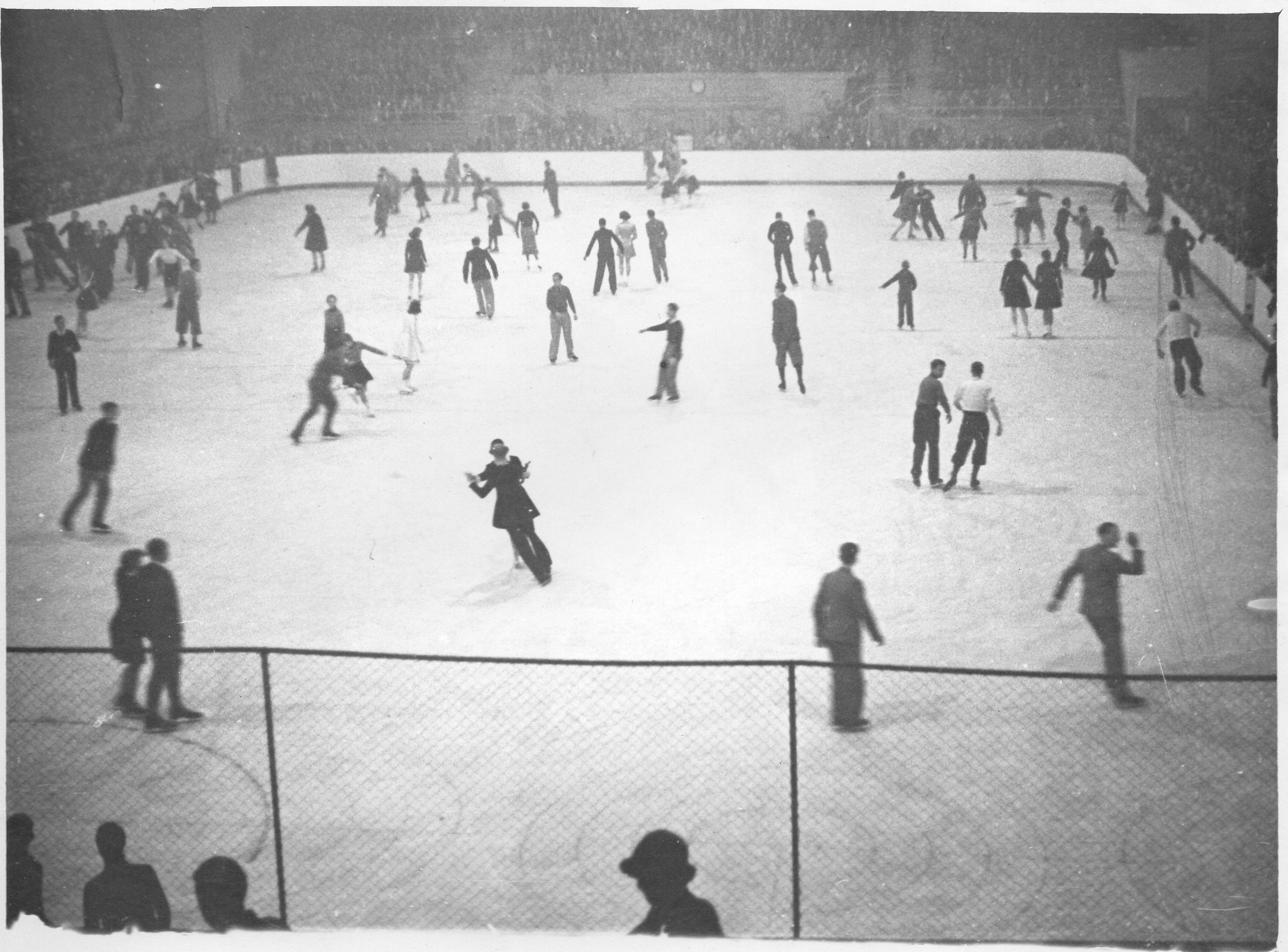
Public Skating at Kirkcaldy Ice Rink circa 1938
