= Ted Bami =

Congolese boxer (born 1978)

Personal information
- Nickname: Dangerous
- Nationality: Congolese; French
- Born: Ted Bami Minsende; March 2, 1978 (age 48) Zaire (now DR Congo)
- Height: 5 ft 7 in (1.70 m)
- Weight: Light Welterweight

Boxing career
- Stance: Orthodox

Boxing record
- Total fights: 33
- Wins: 26
- Win by KO: 13
- Losses: 7
- Draws: 0

Ted Bami Minsende (born 2 March 1978 in Zaire (now Democratic Republic of the Congo)) is a British-French former professional boxer. Nicknamed "Dangerous", Bami is a former European light welterweight champion and British light welterweight title challenger. He was until recently the trainer of his nephew, British boxer Isaac Chamberlain. Bami and Chamberlain parted ways following Chamberlain's accusations of theft; however, in May 2018, the Boxing Board of Control cleared Bami of all accusations and he remained Chamberlain's Manager until 2020.

== Biography ==
Bami was born in Zaire (now Democratic Republic of the Congo) to Congolese-French parents but has lived in France and Britain since the age of 12, having left Zaire to avoid the civil war in the country at that time. Bami holds both Congolese and French nationalities from his parents. He was raised by his uncle who first introduced him to boxing at 15. Bami is self-managed and is trained by James Cook.

== Professional career ==
Bami made his professional boxing debut in September 1998, with a first round stoppage of Des Sowden. In his second professional fight, Bami knocked out Gary Reid in the 2nd round of a scheduled 4 round contest. Reid would go on to challenge for the commonwealth light welterweight title. Bami's first setback came when he was knocked out by Jacek Bielski in his fourth fight.

=== Rise to prominence ===
On 17 August 2002, Bami knocked out the previously undefeated Bradley Pryce in the 6th round. Pryce has since gone on to challenge for the British welterweight title and win the Commonwealth title in the light middleweight division.

In April, 2003, Bami won the vacant World Boxing Federation (WBF) light welterweight title with a 9th round knockout of Vasile 'Laszlo' Herteg. On 26 July 2003, in his first defence of the title, Bami was knocked out by South African Samuel Malinga, who had previously defeated Colin Lynes.

Following the defeat to Malinga, Bami spent the next couple of years fighting mid-level European opposition. During this period his biggest wins were over Hungarian Jozsef Matolcsi, Russian Viktor Baranov and Poland's Rafał Jackiewicz.

=== European title ===
On 14 September 2006, following an injury to Jason Cook, Bami received a late call to fight for the vacant European light welterweight title against Italian Giuseppe Lauri, who had previously lost against Ricky Hatton and Junior Witter. On 22 September 2006, despite having a point deducted for headbutting, Bami defeated Lauri via a unanimous points decision with scores of 117-112 twice and 118-111.

On 30 March 2007, Bami scored another unanimous points decision over Lauri in a rematch for the title. Bami vacated the title following an injury.

=== British title ===
On 14 March 2008, Bami challenged David Barnes for the vacant British light welterweight title. Bami was defeated via a unanimous points decision, in a fight which Barnes controlled with his jab. In July, 2008, Bami returned to winning ways with a 7th round knockout of Stuart Elwell via a body shot.

=== Prizefighter 3: The Welterweights ===
On 24 October 2008, Bami was defeated in the final of the 3rd Prizefighter tournament by Michael Lomax. Bami, favourite going into the tournament, defeated Andrew Ferrans via knockout and Mark Lloyd on points on his way to the final.

=== Bami vs. Hatton ===
On 28 March 2009, Bami was defeated by Matthew Hatton in a 6th round stoppage in an eliminator for the IBO welterweight Title. After the fight, Bami announced that he would continue with his boxing career stating "People now think Ted Bami is over but I’m not over."

== Championships held ==
- European Light Welterweight title
- WBF Light Welterweight title

== Professional boxing record ==
33 fights	26 wins	7 losses
By knockout	13	4
By decision	13	3

No.	Result	Record	Opponent	Type	Round, time	Date	Location	Notes
33	Loss	26–7	Bradley Pryce	TKO	2 (8), 3:00	9 Jul 2010	York Hall, London, England	
32	Loss	26–6	Gavin Rees	UD	3	4 Dec 2009	Olympia, London, England	Prizefighter Light Welterweight Tournament Quarter-Final
31	Loss	26–5	Matthew Hatton	TKO	6 (12), 2:03	28 Mar 2009	Leisure Centre, Altrincham, England	
30	Loss	26–4	Michael Lomax	SD	3	24 Oct 2008	York Hall, London, England	Prizefighter Welterweight Tournament Final
29	Win	26–3	Mark Lloyd	UD	3	24 Oct 2008	York Hall, London, England	Prizefighter Welterweight Tournament Semi-Final
28	Win	25–3	Andrew Ferrans	TKO	1 (3), 1:43	24 Oct 2008	York Hall, London England	Prizefighter Welterweight Tournament Quarter-Final
27	Win	24–3	Stuart Elwell	TKO	7 (8), 2:42	4 Jul 2008	Everton Park Sports Centre, Liverpool, England	
26	Loss	23–3	David Barnes	UD	12	14 Mar 2008	George Carnall Leisure Centre, Manchester, England	For vacant British light welterweight title
25	Win	23–2	Nicolas Guisset	PTS	8	25 Jan 2008	Goresbrook Leisure Centre, Dagenham, England	
24	Win	22–2	Giuseppe Lauri	UD	12	30 Mar 2007	K2 Leisure Centre, Crawley, England	Retained European light welterweight title
23	Win	21–2	Giuseppe Lauri	UD	12	22 Sep 2006	York Hall, London, England	Won vacant European light welterweight title
22	Win	20–2	Maurycy Gojko	KO	4 (6), 1:25	24 Feb 2006	Goresbrook Leisure Centre, Dagenham, England	
21	Win	19–2	Silence Saheed	PTS	6	21 Oct 2005	York Hall, London, England	
20	Win	18–2	Ricardo Daniel Silva	KO	2 (10), 3:00	13 Feb 2005	Brentwood Centre, Brentwood, England	
19	Win	17–2	Rafał Jackiewicz	PTS	8	8 Oct 2004	Brentwood Centre, Brentwood, England	
18	Win	16–2	Viktor Baranov	TKO	2 (8), 2:05	8 May 2004	Goresbrook Leisure Centre, Dagenham, England	
17	Win	15–2	József Matolcsi	PTS	6	31 Jan 2004	York Hall, London, England	
16	Win	14–2	Zoltán Surman	TKO	3 (6), 1:24	9 Oct 2003	Whitchurch Sports Centre, Bristol, England	
15	Loss	13–2	Samuel Malinga	TKO	3 (12), 1:45	26 Jul 2003	The Pavilions, Plymouth, England	Lost WBF (Federation) light welterweight title
14	Win	13–1	Vasile Herteg	TKO	9 (12), 0:43	12 Apr 2003	York Hall, London, England	Won vacant WBF (Federation) light welterweight title
13	Win	12–1	Andrey Devyataykin	TKO	1 (8), 2:43	8 Mar 2003	York Hall, London, England	
12	Win	11–1	Sergey Starkov	PTS	4	7 Dec 2002	Brentwood Centre, Brentwood, England	
11	Win	10–1	Adam Zadworny	PTS	4	16 Oct 2002	Leisure Centre, Maesteg, Wales	
10	Win	9–1	Bradley Pryce	TKO	6 (6), 2:58	17 Aug 2002	Cardiff Castle, Cardiff, Wales	
9	Win	8–1	Keith Jones	TKO	4 (4), 1:07	23 Jun 2002	Elephant & Castle Centre, London, England	
8	Win	7–1	Michael Smyth	KO	4 (6)	19 Mar 2002	Montem Leisure Centre, Slough, England	
7	Win	6–1	Lance Crosby	PTS	6	31 Jul 2001	York Hall, London, England	
6	Win	5–1	Francie Barrett	PTS	6	5 May 2001	Lee Valley Leisure Centre, London, England	
5	Win	4–1	Keith Jones	PTS	4	29 Mar 2001	Novotel Hotel, London, England	
4	Loss	3–1	Jacek Bielski	KO	4 (6)	8 Sep 2000	Novotel Hotel, London, England	
3	Win	3–0	David Kehoe	PTS	4	10 Mar 2000	York Hall, London, England	
2	Win	2–0	Gary Reid	TKO	2 (4), 0:53	11 Feb 1999	Town Hall, Dudley, England	
1	Win	1–0	Des Sowden	TKO	1 (4), 1:26	26 Sep 1998	Elephant & Castle Centre, London, England	

Preceded by Junior Witter; Vacated	European Light Welterweight Champion; 22 September 2006 – 20 July 2007; Vacated	Succeeded by Colin Lynes
