= Des Sowden =

British boxer

Personal information
- Nationality: British
- Born: Desmond Sowden; August 13, 1974 (age 52) Plymouth, UK
- Height: 5 ft 4 in (1.63 m)
- Weight: Super Lightweight

Boxing career
- Stance: Orthodox

Boxing record
- Total fights: 11
- Wins: 1
- Win by KO: 0
- Losses: 10
- Draws: 0

Des Sowden (born 13 August 1974, in Plymouth, England) is a former British professional boxer.

== Career ==
During his two-year professional career, he won just one fight, in which the opponent was disqualified. During his career he was knocked out in under a minute twice and just over a minute once in just 11 bouts. He holds the record for the fastest to be knocked out in a boxing match, being knocked out in the first punch within just two seconds. After this, he retired from boxing.

== Trivia ==
- Congolese boxer Ted Bami fought his first ever fight against Sowden, knocking him out in just 86 seconds.

== Publications ==
- Historical Dictionary of Boxing: by John Grasso
- The Mammoth Book of Losers: by Karl Shaw
