= Salvatore Battaglia =

Italian boxer (born 1973)

Salvatore Battaglia (born 7 November 1973 in Syracuse, Italy) is a professional light-welterweight boxer. He has a boxing record of 22 wins with 5 defeats.

Salvatore is the former Italian light-welterweight champion. He won the title in 2002 when he beat Massimo Bertozzi. He relinquished the belt in 2002. He fought for the Italian Welterweight title in 2006, losing on points to Cristian De Martinis.

He has twice fought for the European title, but lost twice against Oktay Urkal and Junior Witter.
