= Ali Chebah =

French boxer

Personal information
- Nickname: The King of Chebah / The Angel
- Nationality: (France) French (Algeria) Algerian
- Born: Ali Chebah; September 30, 1985 (age 40) Mont-Saint-Aignan, Seine-Maritime, France
- Height: 5 ft 9.5 in / 176 cm
- Weight: light welterweight

Boxing career
- Stance: Orthodox

Boxing record
- Total fights: 39
- Wins: 37
- Win by KO: 30
- Losses: 2
- Draws: 0
- No contests: 0

Ali Chebah (born September 30, 1985) is a French-Algerian professional boxer in the light welterweight division.

Chebah was born in Mont-Saint-Aignan, Seine-Maritime, France and is French Algerian.

On November 10, 2007, he became the interim WBC Youth World light welterweight champion by beating Wellington De Jesus by 3rd-round TKO.

He waits for a fight with Ajose Olusegun for the WBC interim title.
