= Ajose Olusegun =

Nigerian-British boxer (born 1979)

Personal information
- Nickname: The Gun
- Nationality: British; Nigerian
- Born: Segun Ajofe; 6 December 1979 (age 46) Lagos, Nigeria
- Height: 5 ft 7 in (170 cm)
- Weight: Light welterweight

Boxing career
- Reach: 69 in (175 cm)
- Stance: Southpaw

Boxing record
- Total fights: 34
- Wins: 32
- Win by KO: 14
- Losses: 2

Ajose Olusegun (born 6 December 1979) is a British-Nigerian former professional boxer who competed from 2001 to 2014. He challenged once for the WBC interim super lightweight in 2012. At regional level, he held the ABU super lightweight title in 2004;the Commonwealth super lightweight title from 2007 to 2010; and the British super lightweight title in 2009. As an amateur, he won a gold medal in the light welterweight division at the 1999 All-Africa Games and represented Nigeria at the 2000 Sydney Olympic Games.

== Boxing career ==
=== Early professional career ===
Ajose began his career as a professional in May 2001 at the Royal Gardens Hotel in Kensington, London. The former amateur won when the fight was stopped in the first round against Tony Montana. After compiling a ledger of 6-0 he won his first career title, the lightly regarded WBF Inter-continental title against Walthamstow's Martin Holgate. He followed that win by collecting the Nigerian light welterweight title and the African Boxing Union title at the same weight. In September 2004 having compiled a record of 13-0 he met possibly his toughest test when he scored a 4th round win over the talented Bradley Pryce in the Newport Centre in Newport.

=== Commonwealth champion ===
Olusegun scored one other significant victory, a 6th-round knockout of Namibia's Ali Nuumbembe in June 2006 before getting the chance a year later to fight for the vacant Commonwealth light welterweight title against Stoke's Gary Reid. Olusegun had been due to fight for the crown 18 months before when then opponent Colin Lynes pulled out with just 10 days to go. Discussing the fight beforehand, Olusegun said, "I have great respect for Gary Reid as he is the only British based fighter who is willing to get into the ring with me". Bemoaning the fact that he found it tough to find opponents, he added, “I am desperate to fight the best but the best don't want to fight me. I am a lonely shark in the light welterweight ocean." Olusegun ended up winning a unanimous points decision over 12 rounds.

The first defence of his title was made in February 2008 when Ajose beat Nigel Wright in Peterlee, Durham again over 12 rounds. Following the defence Olusegun won three non-title fights with the intention of staying busy whilst calling out the likes of former WBC champion Junior Witter. In February 2009 he made the second defence of his title, beating former English champion Scott Haywood at the Barnsley Metrodome.

=== British champion ===
On 13 June 2009 Olusegun challenged former opponent Nigel Wright for the vacant British light welterweight title, a contest that was only able to take place following the granted of British citizenship to Olusegun on the grounds of residency. Also on the line was the Commonwealth title that the two boxers had previously fought for in February 2008. Olusegun again won the contest with a unanimous points decision to become a two-belt champion. Rather than defending the British belt however Olusegun gave it up choosing to take the opportunity to fight in a World title eliminator instead against undefeated Romanian boxer Ionut Dan in a bout which was scheduled take place on 9 October 2009. The bout against Dan however never materialized and in the intervening period the title was won by Lenny Daws. Olusegun, now the WBC's number 2 ranked boxer next fought on the undercard of David Haye's heavyweight title defence against John Ruiz at the MEN Arena in Manchester. The fight was to be a further defence of the Commonwealth title which he still held and pitched him against Colin Lynes, a man he had been scheduled to fight once before. The defence on 3 April 2010 saw him retain the belt for the fourth time against Lynes who was also a former British champion and who had also held the European belt. On 12 February 2011 Olusegun competed in a non-title six round fight beating Polish journeyman Arek Malek with a World title eliminator still not having come to fruition.

=== WBC World title eliminator ===
Olusegun finally became the mandatory challenger for the WBC light welterweight title on 30 September 2011 with a win over Frenchman Ali Chebah in California. The fight, which went the 12 round distance, saw Olusegun put his opponent down twice in the 3rd round to line up a potential fight against current champion Erik Morales for the full title.

=== Interim WBC light welterweight title ===
After winning a WBC World title eliminator, Olusegun was then out of the ring for over a year. He was then set to fight hard hitting Argentinian Lucas Matthysse on 8 September 2012. The first few rounds were good exchanges for the two brawlers. However, on the tenth round the hard punches from the Argentinian proved too much for the unbeaten Nigerian and therefore the referee stopped the fight via 10th Round TKO.

== Professional record ==
32 Wins (14 Knockouts), 2 Defeats, 0 Draws
Res.	Record	Opponent	Type	Rd., Time	Date	Location	Notes
Win	32–2	(Latvia) Ivans Levickis	PTS	6	2014-12-06	York Hall, Bethnal Green, London, United Kingdom	
Loss	31–2	(United States) Henry Lundy	UD	10	2013-07-19	(United States) Rockingham Park, Salem, New Hampshire, USA	
Win	31–1	(United States) Rynell Griffin	UD	8	2013-04-20	(United States) Horseshoe Casino, Hammond, Indiana, USA	
Loss	30–1	(Argentina) Lucas Matthysse	TKO	10 (12)	2012-09-08	(United States) Hard Rock Hotel and Casino, Las Vegas, Nevada, USA	For vacant Interim WBC Light Welterweight title
Win	30–0	(France) Ali Chebah	UD	12	2011-09-30	(United States) Chumash Casino, Santa Ynez, California, USA	

Preceded by Junior Witter; Vacated	Commonwealth Light Welterweight Champion; 15 June 2007 – 3 April 2010; Vacated	Succeeded by Lee McAllister
Preceded by Paul McCloskey vacated	British Light Welterweight Champion; 13 June 2009 –Sept 18, 2009 vacated	Succeeded by Lenny Daws
