= Victor Lupo Puiu =

Romanian boxer

Personal information
- Nationality: Romanian
- Born: Victor Puiu; February 1, 1979 (age 47)
- Weight: Welterweight

Boxing career
- Stance: Orthodox

Boxing record
- Total fights: 24
- Wins: 20
- Win by KO: 9
- Losses: 2
- Draws: 2
- No contests: 0

Victor Lupo Puiu (born February 1, 1979) is a Romanian professional boxer living and fighting out of Toronto, Canada.

== Professional career ==
Victor Lupo won a ten-round majority decision against the former WBC Super Lightweight Champion Junior Witter (37-4-2, 22 KOs) in a welterweight bout on February 19, 2011, at the Hershey Centre, Mississauga, Ontario, Canada. Scores were 97-92, 96-94, 95-95. Witter was docked a point for holding in round nine and spent a lot of time on the canvas totally gassed. With the win, Lupo claimed the vacant WBC Silver International title.

On December 17, 2011, he lost a hard fought decision against the welterweight Antonin Décarie (26-1 7KO) who captured the WBC International belt. In a bout that had as many clenches as punches, Decarie was able to prevail with 117-112, 118-110, 118-110 decision. The fight took place Quebec City at the Pepsi Colisée.

== Professional record ==
20 Wins (9 knockouts, 11 decisions), 2 Losses, 2 Draws
Res.	Record	Opponent	Type	Rd., Time	Date	Location	Notes
Won	20-2-2	(Spain) Jose Manuel Lopez Clavero	UD	6 (6)	2015-02-21	Sala Polivalentă, Cluj-Napoca, Romania	
Loss	19-2-2	(Canada) Antonin Décarie	UD	12 (12)	2011-12-17	Pepsi Coliseum, Quebec City, Canada	For vacant WBC International welterweight title.
Win	19-1-2	(United Kingdom) Junior Witter	UD	10 (10)	2011-02-19	Hershey Centre, Mississauga, Canada	Won vacant WBC International Silver welterweight title.
Win	18-1-2	(Mexico) Antonio Soriano	UD	8 (8)	2010-04-03	Montreal Casino, Montreal, Canada	
Draw	17-1-2	(Mexico) Ulises Jimenez	PTS	8 (8)	2010-01-16	Hershey Centre, Mississauga, Canada	
Win	17-1-1	(Peru) Leonardo Rojas	TKO	9 (10)	2008-02-29	Bell Centre, Montreal, Canada	
Loss	16-1-1	(Canada) Paul Clavette	MD	8 (8)	2007-11-30	Centre Marcel Dionne, Drummondville, Canada	
Win	16-0-1	(Argentina) Amilcar Edgardo Funes Melian	UD	8 (8)	2006-10-28	Casino du Lac-Leamy, Hull, Canada	
Win	15-0-1	(Guyana) Shawn Garnett	UD	8 (8)	2006-06-23	Polson Pier, Toronto, Canada	
Win	14-0-1	(United States) Maurice Brantley	TKO	4 (8)	2006-05-24	Métropolis, Montreal, Canada	
Win	13-0-1	(Argentina) Walter Sergio Gomez	TKO	5 (12)	2006-04-11	Fairmont Royal York Hotel, Toronto, Canada	
Win	12-0-1	(United States) Darien Ford	DQ	6 (8)	2006-02-25	Casino du Lac-Leamy, Hull, Canada	
Win	11-0-1	(Canada) Claudio Ortiz	UD	10 (10)	2005-12-10	Montreal Casino, Montreal, Canada	Won interim Canada welterweight title.
Win	10-0-1	(Canada) Adam Green	UD	10 (10)	2005-11-02	Métropolis, Montreal, Canada	Won vacant Canada – Quebec Boxing Council (CQB) welterweight title.
Win	9-0-1	(United States) Anthony Ivory	UD	6 (6)	2005-09-10	Montreal Casino, Montreal, Canada	
Win	8-0-1	(United States) Verdell Smith	TKO	6 (6)	2005-05-28	Casino du Lac-Leamy, Hull, Canada	
Win	7-0-1	(Brazil) Denis De Barros	KO	1 (6)	2005-05-14	Montreal Casino, Montreal, Canada	
Win	6-0-1	(United States) William Woods	KO	1 (4)	2005-04-21	Club Soda, Montreal, Canada	
Win	5-0-1	(United States) Billy Lyell	MD	4 (4)	2005-04-09	Montreal Casino, Montreal, Canada	
Win	4-0-1	(United States) Joseph Gomez	TKO	4 (4)	2005-02-26	Casino du Lac-Leamy, Hull, Canada	
Win	3-0-1	(Canada) Darren Kenny	TKO	3 (4)	2005-02-03	Club Soda, Montreal, Canada	
Win	2-0-1	(Republic of Ireland) Mark Riggs	SD	8 (8)	2004-09-09	Fort Garry Place, Winnipeg, Canada	
Win	1-0-1	(United States) Tommy Poey	TKO	1 (4)	2004-05-22	Cornwall Civic Complex, Cornwall, Canada	
Draw	0-0-1	(Canada) Greg Bazile	PTS	4 (4)	2004-04-17	Hershey Centre, Mississauga, Canada	
