= Victor Hugo Castro =

Argentine boxer

Víctor Castro
Personal information
- Full name: Víctor Hugo Castro
- Nickname: "El Negrito"
- Nationality: Argentina
- Born: July 21, 1975 (age 50) Suardi, Santa Fe
- Height: 1.70 m (5 ft 7 in)
- Weight: 63 kg (139 lb)

Sport
- Sport: Boxing
- Weight class: Light Welterweight
Medal record
Pan American Games
| Gold medal – first place | 1999 Winnipeg | Light Welterweight |

Victor Castro (born July 21, 1975) is a boxer from Argentina, who won the gold medal in the Light Welterweight (– 63.5 kg) at the 1999 Pan American Games in Winnipeg, Manitoba, Canada.

Castro defeated Kelson Pinto in the final. He represented his native country at the 2000 Summer Olympics in Sydney, Australia.

Nicknamed El Negrito, he made his professional debut in 2001, but has shown little power so far and has accumulated four losses.

== Professional boxing record ==
31 Wins (13 knockouts), 7 Loss, 1 Draws
| Res. | Record | Opponent | Type | Rd.,Time | Date | Location | Notes |
| Win | 31-7-1 | (Argentina) Carlos Alberto Ibarra | TKO | 3 (4) | 2011-02-05 | Parque Municipal, Villa Carlos Paz, Cordoba, Argentina | |
| Win | 30-7-1 | (Argentina) Cesar Leonardo Telechea | UD | 6 (6) | 2010-10-15 | Polideportivo Unidad Turística, Cordoba, Argentina | |
| Draw | 29-7-1 | (Argentina) Mateo Damian Veron | PTS | 6 (6) | 2010-08-14 | Club Libertad, Sunchales, Santa Fe, Argentina | |
| Loss | 29-7 | (Russia) Ruslan Provodnikov | KO | 2 (12) | 2009-11-28 | CSKA VVS Arena, Samara, Russia | For vacant WBO Inter-Continental light welterweight title |
| Loss | 29-6 | (Canada) Antonin Decarie | UD | 12 (12) | 2009-06-06 | Montreal Casino, Montreal, Quebec, Canada | For WBO NABO welterweight title |
| Loss | 29-5 | (United Kingdom) Junior Witter | KO | 3 (10) | 2008-11-08 | York Hall, Bethnal Green, London, United Kingdom | |
| Win | 29-4 | (Argentina) Rodolfo Ezequiel Martinez | MD | 8 (8) | 2008-07-03 | Luna Park, Buenos Aires, Distrito Federal, Argentina | |
| Win | 28-4 | (Argentina) Sergio Javier Benitez | UD | 6 (6) | 2008-05-17 | Club Quilmes, Rafaela, Santa Fe, Argentina | |
| Loss | 27-4 | (Argentina) Juan Alberto Godoy | SD | 6 (6) | 2007-11-10 | Estadio Municipal, Perez, Santa Fe, Argentina | |
| Win | 27-3 | (Argentina) Nazareno Tripolli | UD | 6 (6) | 2007-07-27 | Club Deportivo Libertad, Sunchales, Santa Fe, Argentina | |
| Win | 26-3 | (Argentina) Raul Zambrano | RTD | 5 (8) | 2007-05-19 | Ce.De.M. N° 2, Caseros, Buenos Aires, Argentina | |
| Win | 25-3 | (Argentina) Guillermo de Jesus Paz | MD | 6 (6) | 2007-04-07 | Ce.De.M. N° 2, Caseros, Buenos Aires, Argentina | |
| Win | 24-3 | (Argentina) Adolfo Dionisio Rios | UD | 6 (6) | 2007-01-15 | Ce.De.M. N° 1, Caseros, Buenos Aires, Argentina | |
| Loss | 23-3 | (Russia) Sergey Sorokin | UD | 12 (12) | 2006-12-03 | DIVS, Ekaterinburg, Russia | |
| Win | 23-2 | (Argentina) Guillermo de Jesus Paz | UD | 6 (6) | 2006-08-05 | Super Domo Orfeo, Cordoba, Cordoba, Argentina | |
| Win | 22-2 | (Argentina) Justo Evangelista Martinez | TKO | 7 (8) | 2006-06-09 | Club 9 de Julio, Morteros, Cordoba, Argentina | |
| Win | 21-2 | (Argentina) Vicente Luis Burgo | UD | 10 (10) | 2005-09-23 | Centro de Congresos y Convenciones, Cosquin, Cordoba, Argentina | |
