= Takaloo =

Iranian-British boxer

Merdud Takalobighashi
Personal information
- Nicknames: Tak, Takaloo or The Margate Rock
- Nationality: Iranian; British
- Born: Merdud Takalobighashi; 23 September 1975 (age 50) Tehran, Iran
- Weight: Welterweight

Boxing career
- Stance: Orthodox

Boxing record
- Total fights: 34
- Wins: 26
- Win by KO: 17
- Losses: 8
- Draws: 0
- No contests: 0

Merdud Takalobighashi (born 23 September 1975 in Tehran, Iran) (Persian: مهرداد تکلوبیغشی), more commonly known as Merdud Takaloo or Takaloo, is an Iranian born British based boxer. He is the older brother to the rapper Mic Righteous.

== Early life ==
Takaloo was born in 1975 in Tehran, Iran. His family later fled the country in the late 1970s after the overthrow of the Shah. His family arrived in the south of England and he is now based in Margate, Kent.

== Career ==
Takaloo boxed from an early age and won a number of amateur titles. In 1997, he became a professional boxer, losing two of his first seven bouts.

At this time he changed trainers and joined Jimmy O'Donnell's gym in London.

Takaloo is a showboat who had good head and body movement, but usually ended up looking bruised, battered but unbowed. His gutsy style made him a popular fighter in England. A one time world title contender and later WBU welterweight champion, Takaloo had problems obtaining a passport to fight outside the UK, but became a British citizen. As an amateur, he fought 72 times, winning 60 bouts, before turning professional in 1997.

He won the fringe WBU light-middleweight world championship belt in 2001 by beating the then undefeated Anthony Farnell in Manchester. Following that, Takaloo secured a shot with WBO champion Daniel Santos at Cardiff Castle, Cardiff when he fought for the WBO and WBU light middleweight title. Takaloo lost this fight on points over twelve rounds.

Takaloo then moved down to welterweight following defeats to Eugenio Monteiro and a chilling knockout loss to unpredictable puncher Wayne Alexander. This move seemed to have been a success as he won the vacant title against Turgay Uzun in February 2006 at the ExCeL Centre in Custom House, and subsequently retained the title against Irish fighter Eamonn Magee on a points verdict.

Takaloo lost the WBU welterweight championship to former British Champion Michael Jennings by a unanimous points decision on 7 April 2007 and a further TKO loss to Anthony Small on 12 January 2008.

== Honours ==
- 2001 WBU Light-middleweight Champion
- 2006 WBU Welterweight Champion

Titles in pretence
Vacant Title last held by Rashi Ali Hadj Matumla	World Light Middleweight Champion; WBU recognition July 7, 2001 - August 17, 2002	
Vacant Title last held by Daniel Santos	World Light Middleweight Champion; WBU recognition February 1, 2003 - September 10, 2004	
Preceded by Eamonn Magee	World Welterweight Champion; WBU recognition 25 February 2006 – 7 April 2007	Succeeded by Michael Jennings
