= Ross Hale =

English boxer (born 1966)

Personal information
- Nickname: The Rooster
- Nationality: English
- Born: 28 February 1966 (age 60) Bristol, England
- Height: 5 ft 9 in (1.75 m)
- Weight: light welter/welter/light middleweight

Boxing career
- Stance: Southpaw

Boxing record
- Total fights: 33
- Wins: 29 (KO 18)
- Losses: 4 (KO 4)

Ross "The Rooster" Hale (born 28 February 1966) born in Bristol is an English amateur, boxing out of National Smelting Company ABC (Avonmouth), and professional light welter/welter/light middleweight boxer of the 1980s and '90s who won the British Boxing Board of Control (BBBofC) Western Area welterweight title, BBBofC British light welterweight title, and Commonwealth light welterweight title, and was a challenger for the BBBofC British welterweight title against Geoff McCreesh, his professional fighting weight varied from 138 lb (63 kg; 9 st 12 lb), i.e. light welterweight to 147 1/4 lb (66.8 kg; 10 st 7.3 lb), i.e. light middleweight.
