= Kevin McIntyre (boxer) =

Scottish boxer (born 1978)

Personal information
- Born: 5 May 1978 (age 48) Paisley, Scotland
- Height: 5 ft 10 1/2 in (179 cm)
- Weight: Welterweight

Boxing career
- Stance: Southpaw

Boxing record
- Total fights: 40
- Wins: 30
- Win by KO: 9
- Losses: 9
- No contests: 1

Kevin McIntyre (born 5 May 1978) is a Scottish former professional boxer who competed from 1998 to 2012. He held the British welterweight title from 2007 to 2008.

== Early professional career ==
McIntyre's first fight as a professional boxer was in November 1998, at the Thistle Hotel, Glasgow, Scotland, when he beat fellow debutant Ray Wood with a fourth round knockout. He would become used to fighting in the city as for his next twelve fights he competed only there. Of these fights 10 had been victories with only two defeats. McIntyre's 13th fight him saw him take his first substantial step up in class when he defeated former British and Commonwealth title challenger Michael Smyth on points over six rounds. The fight of course took place once again in Glasgow.

Three more fights and three more wins later McIntyre fought for his first title belt in April 2002 against Craig Lynch at the Thistle Hotel in Glasgow. On the line was the vacant BBBofC Scottish Area welterweight title with McIntyre winning the title with a ten-round point decision. The result had elevated McIntyre to a decent record of 15–2.

== Title challenges ==
The newly crowned Scottish champion would win his next five fights, victories which included a win over future English champion Nigel Wright. In December 2003 McIntyre now with a record of 20-2 travelled to Manchester and fought for the full British welterweight title for the first time. It was also the first time he had fought outside Scotland. The result ended in disappointment for Kevin after he was stopped by reigning champion David Barnes in the 8th round. McIntyre's next two fights also took place in England and the Scotsman scored wins in Huddersfield and Hereford before returning to Glasgow to fight former victim Nigel Wright at the Braehead Arena. The fight in November 2005 was to be an eliminator for the British light welterweight title and did not prove to be a happy homecoming for McIntyre when the fight was stopped in the very first round handing Kevin his fourth defeat.

The two defeats to Barnes and Wright had indicated that maybe McIntyre had found his level and this sense was further heightened, when, in his next fight in May 2006 he chose to travel to Stoke to fight Gary Reid. The British Masters light welterweight title was on the line but McIntyre disappointed when the fight was once again stopped, this time in the 6th round handing victory to Reid, a man who himself at the time boasted a record of 10 wins with 15 defeats.

== British champion ==
After losing against Reid, McIntyre spent almost a year out of the ring and returned in May 2007 with a victory over David Wakefield. He then followed this up by winning the BBBofC Celtic welterweight title against the previously unbeaten Tony Doherty in Cardiff's International Arena. In November 2007 McIntyre again found himself challenging for the British welterweight title and this time faced fellow Scot Kevin Anderson. McIntyre took the title from Anderson with a one sided points decision and had him on the canvas twice during the fight. McIntyre then in February 2008 fought an immediate rematch against Anderson at Glasgow's Kelvin Hall. The bout ended as another twelve-round points victory for McIntyre confirming that the first victory had not been a fluke against a man many respected as a very able champion.

Controversy was courted after McIntyre was then stripped of the title by the British Boxing Board of Control in June 2008 just four months after his first defence. Injury had forced him to pull out of two scheduled defences against Sheffield's Kell Brook and this was deemed reason enough to strip him of the full title and allow Brook to challenge for the vacant version. Brook went on to win the vacant belt against Welshman Barrie Jones and claimed it via a 7th round stoppage leaving McIntyre empty handed. Speaking of the stripping McIntyre alleged that the board of control had been pushed into the decision by Brook's promoter Frank Warren saying "The Board of Control were weak. They should have been a lot stronger and said, 'no wait a minute, it's not just about the promoter, it's about the fighters as well'". The fighters will eventually face each other in November 2008 and will contest the belt in Glasgow's Kelvin Hall. Speaking about his opponent McIntyre said "Brook is not shy in shouting his mouth off...He is the usual cocky up-and-coming kid who thinks he can beat the world...He hasn't been past seven rounds yet and he will quickly discover who really is out of his depth...I'll just let him rabbit on and look forward to taking care of him on the night." As it happened the fight was to end in disappointment for the former champion as he suffered three knockdowns in the first round to leave nobody in any doubt as to who now had the right to call themselves champion of Britain.

Preceded by Kevin Anderson; WPTS 12	British Welterweight Champion; 2 November 2007 – 6 June 2008 stripped	Succeeded by Kell Brook

== See also ==
- List of British welterweight boxing champions
