= Young Mutley =

British boxer (born 1976)

Personal information
- Nationality: British
- Born: Lee Woodley; 17 May 1976 (age 50) West Bromwich, England
- Height: 5 ft 8 1/2 in (174 cm)
- Weight: Light welterweight; Welterweight

Boxing career
- Stance: Orthodox

Boxing record
- Total fights: 37
- Wins: 30
- Win by KO: 14
- Losses: 7

Lee Woodley (born 17 May 1976), better known by his nickname of Young Mutley, is a British former professional boxer who competed from 1999 to 2013. He held the British welterweight title in 2006, challenged once for the Commonwealth welterweight title in 2006 and once for the British and EBU European super lightweight titles in 2007.

Woodley was involved with gangs in his younger years, which led to him serving a prison sentence for assault. After being released from prison, Woodley took up boxing. His breakthrough came on 28 January 2006 when he beat Michael Jennings the reigning British Welterweight champion in a split decision at Nottingham Arena to claim his first British Championship.

Woodley obtained his nickname from his father, who was said to laugh like Muttley from the cartoon series Wacky Races. He uses his nickname as his name when boxing and has also won the Midlands Area and English light-welterweight titles in his career.

He lost his British title in an up-and-down classic with Commonwealth champion Kevin Anderson at the Aston Villa Events Centre on 1 June 2006. He had Anderson down with a left hook in the first before tiring and being stopped in the tenth.

Subsequently, he rebounded with two wins, one in the first round, and challenged British Light-Welterweight champion Colin Lynes in July 2007, losing by KO in the eighth round of a scrap that Lynes dominated. The vacant European Boxing Union ten-stone title was also on the line.

He is trained and managed by Errol Johnson.

Away from boxing, Woodley is a keen supporter of West Bromwich Albion F.C.

== See also ==
- List of British welterweight boxing champions
