= Ross Minter =

English boxer

Personal information
- Nickname: Ross the Boss
- Nationality: English
- Born: Ross Minter; 10 November 1978 (age 47) Crawley, England
- Weight: Welterweight

Boxing career

Boxing record
- Total fights: 22
- Wins: 17
- Win by KO: 8
- Losses: 4
- Draws: 1
- No contests: 0

Ross Minter (born 10 November 1978) is a former professional boxer. He is the son of Alan Minter, the former undisputed World Middleweight Champion.

Ross "The Boss" won 125 amateur boxing matches before turning professional in 2001 at the age of 21. After a debut win against Brian Coleman in 2001, Minter went on to record 17 wins, 1 draw, 1 defeat by the end of 2005, winning the British Boxing Board of Control English Welterweight boxing title on 12 December 2005. In 2007 Minter starred in the television Contender Challenge: United Kingdom vs. United States on ITV4, also on ESPN.

Minter retired as a fighter in 2008 and later became boxing promoter.

In the past, Minter has supported the Advance Centre for The Scotson Technique (TST) charity from East Grinstead.
