= Joshua Okine =

Ghanaian boxer

Personal information
- Nationality: Ghanaian
- Born: Bukom Tsatsu; 6 March 1980 (age 46) Accra, Ghana
- Height: 5 ft 9 in (1.75 m)
- Weight: welter/light middle/middleweight

Boxing career
- Stance: Southpaw

Boxing record
- Total fights: 37
- Wins: 29 (KO 17)
- Losses: 7 (KO 3)
- Draws: 1

Joshua Okine (born 6 March 1980, in Accra), is a Ghanaian professional welter/light middle/middleweight boxer of the 2000s and 2010s who won the Ghanaian welterweight title, World Boxing Federation (WBF) welterweight title, International Boxing Federation (IBF) Inter-Continental welterweight title, and Commonwealth welterweight title, his professional fighting weight varied from 145 lb (66 kg; 10 st 5 lb), i.e. welterweight to 158 lb (72 kg; 11 st 4 lb), i.e. middleweight.
