= Barry Morrison =

Scottish boxer

Personal information
- Nickname: The Bizness
- Nationality: Scottish
- Born: 8 May 1980 (age 46) Bellshill, Scotland
- Height: 5 ft 7 in (170 cm)
- Weight: Light welterweight

Boxing career
- Reach: 70 in (178 cm)
- Stance: Orthodox

Boxing record
- Total fights: 25
- Wins: 19
- Win by KO: 8
- Losses: 6
- Draws: 0
- No contests: 0

Barry Morrison (born 8 May 1980) is a Scottish former professional boxer who competed from 2003 to 2012. He held the British super lightweight title in 2007.

== Professional career ==
Morrison's first professional fight was in April 2003 at the York Hall, Bethnal Green, London, England, when he defeated the Welshman Keith Jones on points over four rounds.

DATE	OPPONENT	RESULT
12 April 2003	Keith Jones	WON
28 April 2003	Arv Mitto	WON
5 July 2003	Cristian Hodorogea	WON
6 September 2003	Jay Mahoney	WON
4 October 2003	Sergey Starkov	WON
1 November 2003	Tarik Amrouse	WON
28 February 2004	Zoltan Surman	WON
22 April 2004	Andrey Devyataykin	WON
15 October 2004	Adam Zadworny	WON
27 May 2005	Gary Reid	WON
14 October 2005	Tony Montana	WON
17 March 2006	Dean Hickman	WON
21 April 2006	Mihaita Mutu	LOST
22 September 2006	Mounir Guebbas	WON
20 January 2007	Lenny Daws	WON
8 June 2007	Colin Lynes	LOST
19 October 2007	Arek Malek	WON
29 February 2008	Billy Smith	WON
4 July 2008	David Barnes	LOST
19 January 2009	Jason Nesbitt	WON
18 September 2009	Lenny Daws	WON
9 July 2010	Billy Smith	WON
2 October 2010	Paul McCloskey	LOST
23 January 2012	Daniel Micallef	WON
11 February 2012	Adil Anwar	LOST
