= Stephen Haughian =

Irish boxer (born 1984)

Personal information
- Nationality: Irish
- Born: Stephen Haughian; 28 November 1984 (age 41) Lurgan, County Armagh, Northern Ireland
- Weight: welterweight

Boxing career
- Stance: Orthodox

Boxing record
- Total fights: 25
- Wins: 21
- Win by KO: 8
- Losses: 3
- Draws: 1
- No contests: 0

Stephen Haughian (born 20 November 1984) is a professional boxer from Lurgan, County Armagh, Northern Ireland.

== Amateur career ==
Haughian had little experience boxing as a senior amateur but did represent Ireland at national level and was victorious over Benjamin Besmi in an international "dual meet" between the Canadian and Irish teams in Ottawa, Ontario, Canada in October 2003.

== Professional career ==
He then turned professional and had his first pro fight in March 2005, which he won at the King's Hall, Belfast in which Haughian beat Belfast fighter James Gorman on points over four rounds on a card that included Eamonn Magee, Andrew Murray, Jim Rock and Neil Sinclair.

Haughian has compiled an impressive record of 16 wins from his 17 outings since turning professional in 2005. The sole blemish on his record remains a controversial points defeat to Giammario Grassellini for the IBF Intercontinental title at the Kings Hall in Belfast in late 2007. Haughian however reversed that result last time out by outpointing his Italian rival decisively on a Bernard Dunne undercard in November 2008.

The County Armagh boxer stepped up to the next level when he headlined a first ever pro fight night at the Craigavon Leisure Centre on Saturday, 7 February 2009, it was on this night that haughian became the Irish welterweight champion by stopping the champion Billy walsh from Cork in the third round. In January 2009 Haughian was nominated in the Prospect of the Year category at the Irish-boxing.com National Boxing Awards.
