= Robbie Murray =

Irish boxer

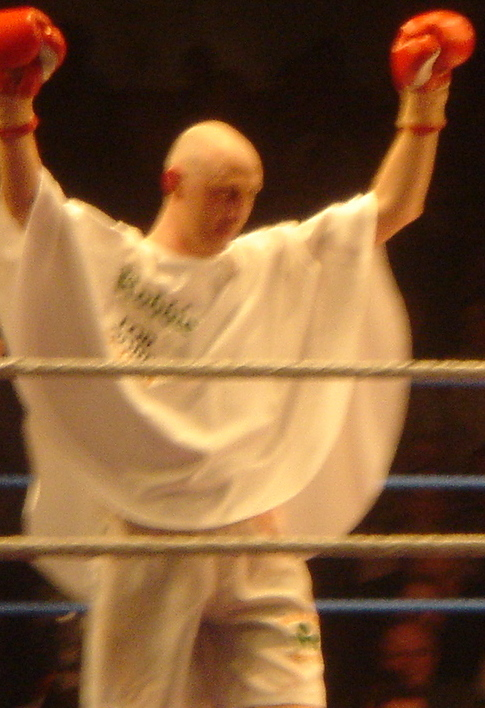

Personal information
- Nickname: Casper or The Flurry
- Nationality: Irish
- Born: Robert Murray; 18 August 1976 (age 50) Dublin, Ireland
- Weight: Welterweight

Boxing career
- Stance: unknown

Boxing record
- Total fights: 6
- Wins: 6
- Win by KO: 1
- Losses: 0
- Draws: 0
- No contests: 0

Robert "Robbie" Murray (born 18 August 1976 in Dublin), nicknamed "Casper" or "The Flurry", is an Irish professional boxer in the welterweight division. Murray has now moved to the welterweight but all of his fights as a professional were fought in the welterweight division.

== Background ==
Murray was born into a large family from Palmerstown, west County Dublin in 1976. Robbie Murray is a cousin of Irish hip-hop artist Ste V Roc and Irish Middleweight champion Jim Rock.

Murray is promoted by Brian Peters and although a native Dubliner, Murray, like his cousin Rock, is trained by Jim Breen and fights out of the Breen Gym in Belfast along with Eamonn Magee and Neil Sinclair.

Murray is also an author who has penned novel.

== Amateur career ==
Murray boxed as an amateur at local, national and represented the Irish national boxing team at an international competition. He also enjoyed victory professional James Moore. After seeing the success of his cousin and after coming through a good experience sparring with "Shamrock" Shea Neary this convinced Murray that he had the skills to become a professional.

== Professional career ==
=== Debut ===
Murray then turned professional in November 2001, winning his first fight at the National Boxing Arena in Dublin, in which Murray beat fellow debutant Paul McIlwaine on a card that included Steve Collins and Eamonn Magee.

Both novices showed that they lacked but also showed their grit and determination in this scrappy and untidy bout. In the fourth round Murray cut McIlwaine badly over his left eye and the referee stopped the fight in the following round by the referee giving Murray a stoppage win in his first outing as a professional.

=== Carlin fight ===
In February 2003, Murray faced Welsh boxer Dafydd Carlin on the undercard of the Neil Sinclair and Jim Rock v Takaloo bout.

The fight took place over four fiercely contested rounds at the Odyssey Arena in Belfast. Murray got off to a great start when he knocked Carlin to the canvas with a sweeping right hook in the first round and also dominated the second. Carlin came back strongly in the third round to trouble Murray. However, Murray knowing that with the knockdown in the first round Carlin would require a knockdown or knockout of his own to gain a draw or victory covered up in the final round to take the win by 38–36 on the scorecards.

=== The Flurry beats Senior ===
Murray then travelled train and spar at Frank Maloney's "Fight Factory Gym" in London. Murray returned from his time in London enthused and his trainer, Jim Breen, was sure Murray was ready to step up a level. Murray was to return to the ring on 30 October 2007 to face unbeaten Scottish fighter Ronnie Nailen at the Ulster Hall in Belfast. However, Murray was forced to pull out of the fight due to injury and was replaced by Glenn McClarnon.

Murray's trademark, which earned him the nickname "the flurry", was his hand speed and solid punch. He displayed this speed in his first fight after a gap of over a year in his impressive win over Nottingham's Nigel Senior at the Burlington Hotel in Dublin on 30 May 2004.

Murray began by attacking the head and body. Although Senior appeared to hold and cover Murray showed his speed and wasted few punches connecting flurries to the body. Senior was on the canvas in the second round though the referee, Emile Tiedt, adjudged it a slip. Senior was again on the canvas in the third but this time it was called as a low blow but Murray finally floored Senior legally in round four but Senior picked himself up once more to continue to the final bell and survive this one sided contest to finish which Murray won by 58 points to 56 points to extend his unbeaten run. After the fight Senior acknowledged that Murray was "a good kid, awkward to fight and he's got fast hands".

=== Ceri Hall fight at the National Stadium ===
Murray's toughest contest of his career came on 19 February 2005, at the National Boxing Stadium in Dublin against Ceri Hall.

In what had become a familiar pattern Murray commanded the opening of the fight on workrate alone, throwing bunches of punches while Halls individual shots were heavier they were too infrequent.

Murray maintained his busy pace using height and reach advantages in the second round when Hall suddenly caught Murray sending Murray to the floor, for the first time in his career, in a flash knockdown. Despite rising quickly, Murray appeared dazed but by the end of the round Murray had returned to his busy style. In the third round Murray, with blood streaming from his nose, appeared more respectful of Hall's power and Hall seemed to be dictating the pace and tempo of the fight.

At the end of the third round, Murray's trainer, John Breen instructed to increase the workrate, which he duly did, taking the fourth and fifth on sheer punch volume. In the sixth it was Murray's turn to floor Hall with a right, left combination, which even the tally in terms on knockdowns.

In the final two rounds both fights tired and in the eighth and final round referee David Ervine docked Hall a point for holding. At the end of the fight the Belfast ref scored the bout 77–75 in favour of Murray which again extended his unbeaten record.

=== Irish title victory ===
On 14 May 2005, Murray was due to fight Hartlepool's Alan Temple for the vacant Irish Light Welterweight championship National Boxing Stadium in Dublin on the undercard of a Bernard Dunne fight. Murray had wanted to face London based Galway Olympian, Francie Barrett but he stated ""I know Francie will want this title but unfortunately negotiations broke down this time....but I know he will not want anyone else to have it"

In any event Murray faced another London based Galwegian the former British Southern Area Lightweight title holder Peter McDonagh for the belt. Murray was a comparative novice in the professional ranks in comparison to McDonagh who was an experienced campaigner having already faced the likes of Peter Buckley, Chilli John and David Burke, whereas Murray had never been past eight rounds.

In the opening rounds Murray dominated McDonagh with a higher workrate and McDonagh appeared content to counter punch. Through the middle round McDonagh began to stand firm against Murray's onslaught of flurries. Murray's high workrate left his defence open at times which McDonagh began to take advantage of.

Towards the latter rounds McDonagh appeared to fade and become ragged, however, Murray's fitness told as he was able to continue his marauding style, pushing forward and making his superior workrate count.

The tenth and final round highlight the desire that both men had to win an Irish title. A fresher looking Murray still seemed to gain the upper hand in the exchanges to finish the fight strongly. Belfast referee Sean Russell scored the fight 98–94 to give Murray the Irish national title.

Murray was then presented with the belt by former professional, Sligonian, Vinny Feeney and then stated "I knew my persistent and aggressive style would catch up with him eventually. He was tough though, he worked hard throughout and it was an eye opener for me and just what I needed at this stage in my career".

== Move to welterweight ==
Murray has only fought intermittently since debut and a highly anticipated Irish title fight against US based Irishman Oisin Fagan has been cancelled as Murray has now vacated the Irish title and stated that he is moving up to the welterweight division.

Murray is currently ranked 7th in Irish.boxing.com's rankings of welterweights after up a division, however, as a light welterweight he was ranked number in the Boxing Union of Ireland lists in 2005.

== See also ==
- Jim Rock
