= Jeff Thomas (boxer) =

British boxer (born 1981)

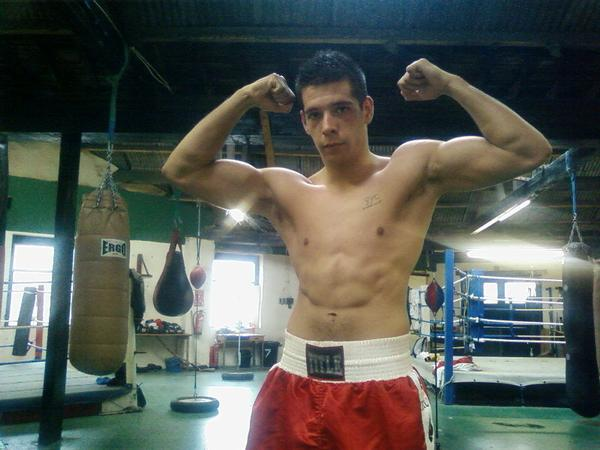

Personal information
- Nationality: (United Kingdom) British
- Born: Jeff Charles Thomas; 30 October 1981 (age 44) Dordrecht, Netherlands
- Weight: Super Featherweight to Light Middleweight

Boxing career
- Stance: Orthodox

Boxing record
- Total fights: 58
- Wins: 37
- Win by KO: 8
- Losses: 18
- Draws: 3
- No contests: 0

Jeff Thomas (born 30 October 1981) is a British professional boxer.

Thomas fought at light welterweight and was a challenger for the Irish light welterweight title and the British Masters super featherweight and light welterweight titles.

== Background ==
Thomas was born in Dordrecht but was raised in Feltham, London where he attended St Laurence's RC Primary, Feltham and St Edmunds RC Primary, Whitton. He moved from London aged 12 to St Annes-on-Sea near Blackpool in Lancashire, England where he attended Our Lady Star of the Sea Primary, St Anne's and St Bede's RC High School, Lytham. After leaving school Thomas worked as a travel agent before moving into professional boxing and subsidising his wage working as a door supervisor in Blackpool. Thomas now works as a personal trainer and boxing coach at Fightworks ABC in Blackpool.

== Amateur career ==
At amateur level, Thomas won a North West England novice title and reached the quarterfinals of the senior Amateur Boxing Association of England championship's in 2001 where he was beaten by eventual finalist Steven Mathews. He also lost a close majority decision to double ABA champion and future WBU World Champion Steve Foster jnr and scored a good first round stoppage win over James Lee. Thomas finished his amateur career with aN 8-8 junior and 19-4 senior record with 7 stoppages.

== Professional career ==
=== Debut ===
Thomas turned professional in December 2001 in Blackpool. On his debut he defeated Birkenhead's Peter Allen on points over six rounds (59/55). Allen would go on to beat Central Area Champion Eddie Nevins and draw with Commonwealth Super Bantamweight Champion Isaac Ward.

=== British Masters title fights ===
Thomas was undefeated in his first seven fights including decision wins over Midland Area Champion Peter Buckley and Central Area Champion Daniel Thorpe plus a draw with the then highly rated Carl Allen (who had Ko'd British Champion Dazzo Williams and drawn with future British Champion Lee Meager in recent fights). Then, in September 2003, Thomas fought against Scot Lee McAllister for the British Masters light welterweight title in the Scot's hometown, Aberdeen. McAllister, the Scottish Champion and future WBU Double World Champion won the title by close decision on points over ten rounds by a margin 95-97. Thomas was devastated by the verdict having floored the Scot twice and largely dominated most of the contest.

Three months later in Thomas next fight he faced Yorkshire's Martin Hardcastle again on his opponent's home turf in Bradford. This time Thomas had shed 8 lb, as the fight was for the British Masters super featherweight title, but again Thomas having floored his opponent lost on points over ten rounds (96/95). Thomas felt with some justification he had been the victor in both contests.

Hardcastle and McAllister then faced each other in their next bout. McAllister came out the eventual victor, after which Hardcastle retired from boxing. McAllister went from strength to strength, winning WBU World Titles at Lightweight and Light Welterweight.

=== Missed opportunity ===
Over the following three years Thomas' interest in the sport waned. Thomas, trying to score an upset, took bouts on short notice against Ricky Burns and Steve Murray, troubling both before losing each fight conclusively. However, he also gained a points victory, over former British Title Challenger, British Masters and Midlands Area Champion Anthony Hanna, and then went on to beat Wales' Anthony Christopher.

This led Thomas to get a chance to fight for the biggest pay day of his career, against Olympic silver medalist Amir Khan. Thomas was approached to fight Khan in December 2005 on the undercard of the Williams v. Harrison but he had contracted to fight Baz Carey, whom Khan had beaten three months previous to that in only his second professional fight.

An alternate date in the beginning of 2006 was suggested for the pair to fight but it was imperative that Thomas defeat Baz Carey during their scheduled contest in Blackpool. Unfortunately for Thomas he lost on points to Carey and lost his chance to fight Khan. Again some felt that Thomas had been unfortunate, though not Thomas himself.

=== Irish light welterweight title ===
Following a win over Nuneaton Veteran Kristean Laight, Thomas got the opportunity to fight for the vacant Irish light welterweight title in June 2006. The Irish title had been vacated by unbeaten Dubliner Robbie Murray to allow Oisin Fagan and Peter McDonagh to fight for the title. However, McDonagh pulled out of the fight which allowed Thomas the chance to step in and fight for the vacant title at the National Stadium, Dublin.

Fagan won the Irish title in front of his friends and family after he stopped Thomas in the seventh round. Fagan would go on to lose a split decision to unbeaten Former IBF World Lightweight Champion Paul Spadafora and had already gone the distance with Julio Cesar Chavez Junior before being stopped by British prospect Amir Khan in 2008.

Thomas decided to return to the ring in March 2011 and featured on Prizefighter light middleweights 2. He scored draws against Rick Boultor and Kris Agei-Dua, and wins over Mousad Wali and Andrew Patterson. A loss in between the Wali and Patterson fights to Nathan Weise put paid to any real progress in his comeback but Thomas was very pleased to have returned after so long away.

The draw with Agei-Dua was the first in prizefighter history and came on the back of a famous Twitter campaign leading to his inclusion.

As a pro Thomas campaigned as a Super Featherweight, Lightweight, Light-Welterweight, Welterweight, Light-Middleweight, Middleweight and had his final fight at Super Middleweight.
