= Gary Lockett =

Wales boxer

Personal information
- Nicknames: Rocket Man; Pocket Rocket
- Nationality: Welsh
- Born: 25 November 1976 (age 49) Cwmbran, Wales
- Height: 5 ft 10 in (178 cm)
- Weight: Middleweight

Boxing career
- Reach: 73 in (185 cm)
- Stance: Orthodox

Boxing record
- Total fights: 32
- Wins: 30
- Win by KO: 21
- Losses: 2

Gary Lockett (born 25 November 1976) is a Welsh former professional boxer and middleweight world title challenger. He currently works as a boxing trainer.

== Professional career ==
In his first professional fight in September 1996, Lockett defeated Ernie Loveridge by KO in the first round on a card that included Eamonn Magee, Andrew Murray, Jim Rock and Neil Sinclair.

February 2002 saw Lockett fight WBA No. 4 ranked Kevin Kelley for the WBO Intercontinental title. Lockett came from the brink of being stopped with a badly cut eye, to knock out Kelley with an overhand right in the 4th round.

In April 2002 Lockett suffered the first defeat of his professional career when he dropped a 12-round split decision to Yuri Tsarenko of Belarus, for the WBO Inter-Continental light middleweight title. Lockett gained revenge for this defeat with a 10-round points victory in a rematch in May 2003.

=== WBU middleweight belt ===
After the Tsarenko rematch Locket continued his winning ways, putting together a streak of six further victories over some lightly regarded fighters and journeymen. In March 2006 he faced off against Gilbert Eastman for the vacant WBU middleweight title. Lockett won the title in emphatic fashion with a first-round TKO victory. He made his first defence of the belt against Ryan Rhodes in July 2006, winning a unanimous decision over 12 rounds. He then made one further defence of his belt, a third-round TKO victory over Lee Blundell. These performances along with additional non-title wins against Ayitey Powers and Kai Kauramaki led to Lockett being ranked as the #1 contender by the WBO for their middleweight title.

=== World title shot ===
It was announced on 13 March 2008 that Locket would be the next opponent for the unified WBC and WBO middleweight champion Kelly Pavlik. The bout took place on 7 June 2008 at the Boardwalk Hall in Atlantic City, New Jersey, and as well as his WBC and WBO belts Pavlik’s Ring magazine belt was also on the line. Lockett was unsuccessful in his attempt to take the titles away from Pavlik, hitting the canvas three times before his cornerman Enzo Calzaghe threw in the towel in round 3 to end the fight.

== Retirement ==
In the immediate aftermath of the Pavlik defeat, Lockett stated that he would be considering whether or not he would continue his career, as he admitted that in his own words he had “never been a lover of boxing” and struggled to see how he could motivate himself for further contests after fighting for a world title. After several months off to recuperate and reflect on his ring future, which included starting a new career as an online boxing columnist for Sport, Lockett confirmed his retirement from professional boxing in September 2008.

== Trainer ==
Lockett became a boxing trainer, gaining his British Boxing Board of Control licence. Notable fighters he has worked with include Gavin Rees, Enzo Maccarinelli, Liam Williams, Nick Blackwell, Jay Harris, Maxi Hughes and Chris Jenkins

On 26 March 2016 at Wembley Arena, during his third title defence, Blackwell lost to Chris Eubank, Jr. Following the mid-way point and in the corner between rounds, Chris Eubank Sr. was heard to instruct his son to refrain from punching Blackwell in the head; Eubank Sr. himself knowing well the reality of traumatic injuries in boxing from his own tragic fight against Michael Watson 25 years prior. In the tenth round the referee summoned the ringside doctor to assess Blackwell, who in turn deemed him unable to continue due to the swelling on his head obstructing his vision, therefore handing Eubank Jr. the victory and title. Some minutes after the fight was stopped, Blackwell was given oxygen and taken out of the arena by stretcher. He was later taken to St Mary's Hospital with bleeding of the skull (outside the brain) and placed in a medically-induced coma, but an operation was not deemed necessary. The following weekend, he was brought out of the coma. In April 2016, Blackwell announced his retirement from boxing via Twitter, but expressed his desire to be involved in the sport in some capacity. Lockett later in interview described "The weeks since the fight have definitely been the worst time in my life. Everyone says boxers know the risks. But do they, do they really?" Having support the Blackwell family through his period in hospital in a coma, they have in turn supported Lockett in his choice after a period of personal review to continue training boxers.
