= Patrick Hyland =

Irish professional boxer (born 1983)

Personal information
- Nickname: The Punisher
- Nationality: Irish
- Born: Patrick Joseph Hyland; 16 September 1983 (age 43) Tallaght, Dublin, Ireland
- Height: 1.73 m (5 ft 8 in)
- Weight: Featherweight; Super featherweight

Boxing career
- Stance: Orthodox

Boxing record
- Total fights: 34
- Wins: 31
- Win by KO: 15
- Losses: 3

Patrick Joseph Hyland (born 16 September 1983) is an Irish former professional boxer from Dublin. He competed at featherweight and super featherweight.

== Professional career ==
Hyland turned professional in September 2004 in the City West Hotel, Dublin, on an undercard of a bill that included Jim Rock and Peter Buckley. In his debut Hyland beat Birmingham's Dean Ward on points over four rounds.

=== Irish title ===
He was the Irish featherweight champion.

Defeating Paul Griffin with 3rd-round KO at then National Stadium in Dublin

=== WBF title ===
Hyland became the WBF featherweight champion, on 25 June 2011, by defeating France's Philippe Frenois at the National Stadium in Dublin.

=== Moving to the United States ===
In September 2011, Hyland moved to New York City to link up with Final Round Promotions. Hyland defeated former Manny Pacquiao and Diego Magdaleno opponent Emmanuel Lucero by unanimous decision, and his next fight took place against experienced veteran Frankie Archuleta in the Mid-Hudson Civic Center, New York, on 5 May 2012, a fight in which he stopped Archuleta in the 4th round. On 8 August 2012, he won a unanimous decision over Carlos Fulgencio in the 8 round main event at Sahlen Stadium in Rochester, New York. This improved his record to 27–0 and set a new Irish record for most consecutive wins ever by an Irish boxer.

=== WBA interim title shot ===
On 8 December 2012, Hyland faced fellow unbeaten fighter Javier Fortuna of the Dominican Republic in the MGM Grand, in Las Vegas, Nevada for the interim WBA title on the undercard of Manny Pacquiao vs. Juan Manuel Marquez IV on HBO PPV. In a very competitive fight, the iron-chinned Hyland lost the unanimous decision to Fortuna who seemed to be the busier boxer throughout the bout.

WBC World Title

Hyland challenged WBC champion Gary Russell Jr on 16 April 2016 at Foxwoods Casino as main event on US TV network Showtime. Hyland lost in round 2 Russell's fast hands to much for Hyland on the night dropping Hyland 3 times in the 2nd round.

== Professional boxing record ==
31 Wins (15 Knockouts), 3 Losses, 0 Draws
Res.	Record	Opponent	Type	Round	Date	Location	Notes
Loss	31–3	(United Kingdom) Josh Warrington	TKO	9 (12)	2016-07-30	(United Kingdom) First Direct Arena, Leeds, Yorkshire, England	
Loss	31–2	(United States) Gary Russell Jr.	KO	2 (12)	2016-04-16	Foxwoods Resort Casino, Mashantucket, CT, United States	For WBC featherweight title
Win	31–1	(United States) David Martinez	TKO	8 (8)	2015-10-10	Lowell Memorial Auditorium, Lowell, MA, United States	
Win	30–1	(Colombia) Manuel de los Reyes Herrera	KO	4 (10)	2015-03-14	Madison Square Garden, New York, NY, United States	
Win	29–1	(Romania) Oszkar Fiko	PTS	8	2014-11-15	(Republic of Ireland) 3Arena, Dublin, Ireland	
Win	28–1	(Puerto Rico) Noel Echevarria	TKO	4 (8)	2014-07-23	BB King Blues Club & Grill, New York, NY, United States	
Loss	27–1	(Dominican Republic) Javier Fortuna	UD	12	2012-12-08	MGM Grand, Las Vegas, NV, United States	For WBA interim featherweight title
Win	27–0	(Dominican Republic) Carlos Fulgencio	UD	8	2012-08-08	Sahlen Stadium, Rochester, NY, United States	
Win	26–0	(United States) Frankie Archuleta	TKO	4 (10)	2012-01-12	Mid-Hudson Civic Center, Poughkeepsie, NY, United States	
Win	25–0	(Mexico) Emmanuel Lucero	UD	8	2012-01-28	Resorts Hotel & Casino, Atlantic City, NJ, United States	
Win	24–0	(Italy) Fabrizio Trotta	TKO	4 (8)	2011-08-12	(Republic of Ireland) National Stadium, Dublin, Ireland	
Win	23–0	(France) Philippe Frenois	UD	12	2011-06-25	(Republic of Ireland) National Stadium, Dublin, Ireland	Won vacant WBF featherweight title
Win	22–0	(France) Daniel Kodjo Sassou	PTS	6	2011-04-30	(United Kingdom) Olympia, Kensington, London, England	
Win	21–0	(Albania) Suat Laze	PTS	8	2010-11-20	(Republic of Ireland) International Events Arena, Castlebar, Ireland	
Win	20–0	(Bulgaria) Yordan Vasilev	PTS	6	2010-10-02	(Republic of Ireland) Letterkenny Leisure Complex, Letterkenny, Ireland	
Win	19–0	(United Kingdom) Mickey Coveney	TKO	7 (10)	2010-02-13	(Republic of Ireland) National Stadium, Dublin, Ireland	Defended Irish featherweight title
Win	18–0	(Spain) Manuel Sequera	TKO	6 (8)	2009-09-26	(Republic of Ireland) The O2, Dublin, Ireland	
Win	17–0	(Sweden) Abdul Tebazalwa	UD	12	2009-07-25	(Republic of Ireland) National Basketball Arena, Dublin, Ireland	Won vacant IBF International featherweight title
Win	16–0	(Nicaragua) Carlos Guevera	UD	10	2009-03-14	Dorchester Armory, Boston, MA, United States	Won vacant IBA Intercontinental super featherweight title
Win	15–0	(Dominican Republic) Elvis Luciano Martinez	TKO	2 (4)	2008-10-04	Dorchester Armory, Boston, MA, United States	
Win	14–0	(Kenya) John Gicharu	TKO	1 (8)	2008-09-06	(Republic of Ireland) City West Hotel, Dublin, Ireland	
Win	13–0	(Kenya) Geoffrey Munika	PTS	8	2008-07-05	(Republic of Ireland) National Basketball Arena, Dublin, Ireland	
Win	12–0	(United Kingdom) Robin Deaken	TKO	5 (6)	2008-05-31	(United Kingdom) Shorts Sports & Social Club, Belfast, Northern Ireland	
Win	11–0	(Republic of Ireland) Paul Griffin	TKO	3 (10)	2008-04-19	(Republic of Ireland) National Stadium, Dublin, Ireland	Won vacant Irish featherweight title
Win	10–0	(United States) Mike Dobbs	TKO	1 (8)	2008-03-15	Orpheum Theatre, Boston, MA, United States	
Win	9–0	(Romania) Gheorge Ghiompirica	PTS	8	2008-01-26	(Republic of Ireland) Neptune sports arena, Dublin, Ireland	
Win	8–0	(Slovakia) Roman Rafael	TKO	1 (6)	2007-07-14	(Republic of Ireland) National Stadium, Dublin, Ireland	
Win	7–0	(Hungary) Lajos Beller	TKO	1 (4)	2007-06-23	(Republic of Ireland) The Point, Dublin, Ireland	
Win	6–0	(Hungary) Tibor Besze	KO	1 (4)	2006-03-11	(Republic of Ireland) National Stadium, Dublin, Ireland	
Win	5–0	(United Kingdom) Craig Morgan	PTS	4	2005-11-18	(United Kingdom) Goresbrook Leisure Centre, Dagenham, Essex, England	
Win	4–0	(Slovakia) Imrich Parlagi	PTS	4	2005-09-17	(Republic of Ireland) National Stadium, Dublin, Ireland	
Win	3–0	(United Kingdom) Peter Buckley	PTS	4	2005-06-04	(Republic of Ireland) National Stadium, Dublin, Ireland	
Win	2–0	(United Kingdom) Steve Gethin	PTS	4	2005-02-03	(United Kingdom) International Centre, Brentwood, Essex, England	
Win	1–0	(United Kingdom) Dean Ward	PTS	4	2004-09-24	(Republic of Ireland) City West Hotel, Dublin, Ireland	Professional debut
