= Newbridge boxing club =

The Newbridge Boxing Club is a boxing gym based in Newbridge (Tre Celyn) in South Wales, which was operated by Enzo Calzaghe. The club has been one of the most successful of recent years, at one point in 2007 boasting three genuine world champions in Joe Calzaghe (WBO super-middleweight), Enzo Maccarinelli (WBO cruiserweight) and Gavin Rees (WBA light welterweight). Other fighters of note who have won belts at the club include former Commonwealth light middleweight champion Bradley Pryce and former WBU champion and world title challenger Gary Lockett who retired in Sept 2008.

== The clubhouse ==
"It is cold, dark and dingy, and purposely so. No jacuzzis or state-of-the-art steam rooms in this scruffy stone hut with a corrugated roof under which is scrawled "Newbridge Boxing Club"

— The Independent, visiting the clubhouse prior to Joe's fight with Mikkel Kessler

The club itself is in its second generation, as the original clubhouse, deemed unsafe by the local council, was demolished in 2002. Following the demolition, Joe and his father Enzo bought another clubhouse just a mile away in Cwmcarn and set about transforming an old rugby club into a boxing gym.

The club is situated near an industrial park next to a rugby pitch and reached by a set of wooden steps on which the boxers use to train. The sign greeting people is hand painted and trash dots the weedy yard. This impression of the club does not meet expectations when people think about it being the training HQ for a World champion. According to a reporter from the LA Times who visited the clubhouse prior to Joe's clash with Bernard Hopkins, "in places, it’s just a few notches north of squalid". One reporter during the same press trip is alleged to have spotted a dead mouse floating in a sink.

Despite appearances Joe Calzaghe has described the place as feeling "like a palace" compared with the previous gym which had a ring made out of carpet and held up by broom handles. Prior to the move to the new clubhouse boxers had trained for years in what Joe describes as "the mangiest little building you could possibly imagine" with no heating, no showers, bad toilets and buckets to trap the rain.

== World champions ==
The Newbridge Boxing Club, considering its location in such a small town, has had a disproportionate influence on the global boxing scene.
