= Senan Kelly =

Irish boxer (born 1996)

Personal information
- Born: 27 March 1996 (age 30) Leixlip, Ireland
- Weight: Light welterweight; Welterweight

Boxing career
- Stance: Orthodox

Boxing record
- Total fights: 10
- Wins: 10
- Win by KO: 2
- Losses: 0

Senan Kelly (born 27 March 1996) is an Irish professional boxer who has held the Irish welterweight title since October 2024.

== Professional career ==
Kelly made his debut on 12 October 2019, stopping Ilias Liokaftos in the third round at the Devenish Complex in Belfast. Kelly then fought again at the same site on 1 February 2020, scoring another win over Josue Bendana, this time by points decision.

After a three-year absence, Kelly made his return to the ring in 2023. First he won a four-round bout against Jake Osgood on 24 February, at the Crowne Plaza Hotel in Glasgow. He then scored a third-round knockout over Traycho Georgiev on 1 April, at the National Stadium in Dublin. Kelly won two more bouts in the year, which took place in June and November.

Kelly faced Jake Tinklin for the vacant Irish Celic super-lightweight title on 9 February 2024, at the Warehouse at The Redcow Hotel in Dublin. After eight rounds, he won the vacant belt by points decision. After scoring another victory, Kelly faced Matthew Tyndall for the vacant Irish welterweight title on 4 October 2024. He won the bout by unanimous decision to win the title.

In his first title defense, Kelly faced Declan Geraghty on 12 April 2025. After ten rounds, he won the bout by split decision.

== Professional boxing record ==
| 18 fights | 18 wins | 0 losses |
|---|---|---|
| By knockout | 2 | 0 |
| By decision | 8 | 0 |

| No. | Result | Record | Opponent | Type | Round, time | Date | Location | Notes |
|---|---|---|---|---|---|---|---|---|
| 10 | Win | 10–0 | Declan Geraghty | SD | 10 | 12 Apr 2025 | National Stadium, Dublin, Ireland | Retained Irish welterweight title |
| 9 | Win | 9–0 | Matthew Tyndall | UD | 10 | 4 Oct 2024 | Warehouse at The Red Cow, Dublin, Ireland | Won vacant Irish welterweight title |
| 8 | Win | 8–0 | Dale Arrowsmith | PTS | 6 | 10 May 2024 | Warehouse at The Red Cow, Dublin, Ireland | |
| 7 | Win | 7–0 | Jake Tinklin | PTS | 8 | 9 Feb 2024 | Warehouse at The Red Cow, Dublin, Ireland | Won vacant Irish Celic super-lightweight title |
| 6 | Win | 6–0 | Edgar Kemsky | PTS | 4 | 3 Nov 2023 | Warehouse at The Red Cow, Dublin, Ireland | |
| 5 | Win | 5–0 | Hermin Isava | UD | 6 | 10 Jun 2023 | Evolution Boxing Elche, Elche, Spain | |
| 4 | Win | 4–0 | Traycho Georgiev | KO | 2 (6) | 1 April 2023 | National Stadium, Dublin, Ireland | |
| 3 | Win | 3–0 | Jake Osgood | PTS | 4 | 24 Feb 2023 | Crowne Plaza Hotel, Glasgow, Scotland | |
| 2 | Win | 2–0 | Josue Bendana | PTS | 4 | 1 Feb 2020 | Devenish Complex, Belfast, Northern Ireland | |
| 1 | Win | 1–0 | Ilias Liokaftos | TKO | 3 (4), 1:15 | 12 Oct 2019 | Devenish Complex, Belfast, Northern Ireland | |
