= Calzaghe =

Calzaghe is a surname. Notable people with the surname include:

- Enzo Calzaghe (1949–2018), Italian-born Welsh boxing trainer
- Joe Calzaghe (born 1972), Welsh boxer, son of Enzo
