= Emmanuel Lucero =

Mexican boxer

Personal information
- Nicknames: The Butcher; El Carnicero
- Born: 3 November 1978 (age 47) Mexico City, Mexico
- Height: 1.63 m (5 ft 4 in)
- Weight: Bantamweight; Super bantamweight Featherweight; Super featherweight

Boxing career
- Reach: 170 cm (67 in)
- Stance: Orthodox

Boxing record
- Total fights: 41
- Wins: 26
- Win by KO: 14
- Losses: 14
- Draws: 1
- No contests: 0

Emmanuel Lucero (born 3 November 1978) is a Mexican former professional boxer who competed from 1998 to 2013. He is best known for his fight against Manny Pacquiao for the IBF super bantamweight title on 26 July 2003 at the Olympic Auditorium, Los Angeles The fight went three rounds when Pacquiao won the fight by TKO.

== Professional career ==
He challenged Daniel Ponce de Leon for the vacant WBO NABO super bantamweight title on October 22, 2004 at the County Coliseum, El Paso, Texas. Lucero lost; he was knocked out in the third round. He won the WBC Continental Americas super bantamweight title when he defeated John Lowey. Lucero was a very high prospect when he fought Manny Pacquiao. At the time, his record was twenty two fights with one draw and no defeats. He fought Robert DaLuz on 26 August 2010 the fight was quite close but Lucero won the bout after two separate defeats by unanimous decision.

=== Lucero vs Pacquiao ===
On July 26, 2003 Lucero challenged Manny Pacquiao for his IBFSuper Bantamweight title. The fight went a head at Olympic Auditorium in Los Angeles with a packed stadium, Lucero started to attack straight away in the first round but Pacquiao was just too fast.

Pacquiao kept counterattacking and started to wear down Lucero as Pacquiao has a great technique. Again Lucero started attacking again at the beginning of the Round 2 but was still not fast enough. At the beginning of the round Manny Pacquiao and Emmanuel Lucero had an exchange of punches Pacquiao gave Lucero a right hand then his famous left which staggered Lucero so badly that the referee Jose Cobian had to stop the fight.

=== Out The Ring For Three Years ===
Lucero had retired at just the age of 29 after his fifth loss. After the fight with Jason Litzau which was his fifth defeat he quit boxing for three years. It was a bad time for Lucero as it looked like he had no potential left. He made his come back with a bout with Robert DaLuz which he was fought at Township Auditorium Columbia, South Carolina which he had won by unanimous decision round eight. He is looking to make a successful come back with his first won over Robert DaLuz. DaLuz had only won his last fight with one win in five and four defeats. A lot of criticism had been thrown at Lucero because of his picking bad fights.

=== Comeback fights ===
On Oct 30, 2010, Lucero fought Jorge Diaz. He lost to Diaz by Unanimous Decision.

On January 22, 2011, he fought Oscar Cuero for the Junior Lightweight Division. Lucero keeping Cuero to the ropes until it comes to a decision. Lucero won by Unanimous Decision. He also fought Carlos Rivera on 15 April 2011 at Hudson Valley Community College, Troy, New York, United States and beat him by unanimous decision to win the vacant USA New York State super featherweight title. On August 8, 2011, he fought Yuandale Evans. However, he lost to Evans by a TKO on the sixth round. Months later, on November 11, 2011, he fought a hungry young fighter Diego Magdaleno. However, he lost again by Unanimous Decision. After that fight, he fought prospect Patrick Hyland at Resorts Hotel & Casino, Atlantic City, New Jersey. However, he lost by Unanimous Decision in 8 rounds.

== Professional boxing record ==
26 Wins (14 knockouts), 10 Defeats, 1 Draw
Res.	Record	Opponent	Type	Rd., Time	Date	Location	Notes
Loss	26-10-1	(Dominican Republic) Claudio Marrero	UD	10	2012-05-18	(United States) Seminole Hard Rock Hotel and Casino, Hollywood, Florida, U.S.	For WBC FECARBOX featherweight title
Loss	26-9-1	(Republic of Ireland) Patrick Hyland	UD	8	2012-01-28	(United States) Resorts Hotel & Casino, Atlantic City, New Jersey, U.S.	
Loss	26-8-1	(United States) Diego Magdaleno	UD	10	2011-11-11	(United States) Mandalay Bay Resort & Casino, Paradise, Nevada, U.S.	
Loss	26-7-1	(United States) Yuandale Evans	TKO	6 (8), 2:06	2011-07-08	(United States) Phoenix, Arizona, U.S.	
Win	26–6-1	(United States) Carlos Rivera	UD	8	2011-04-15	(United States) New York City, U.S.	Vacant New York State super featherweight title
Win	25–6-1	(Colombia) Oscar Cuero	UD	10	2011-01-22	(United States) Crowne Plaza, Albany, New York, U.S.	
Loss	24–6-1	(United States) Jorge Diaz	UD	12	2010-10-30	(United States) Atlantic City, New Jersey, U.S.	
