= Javier Fortuna =

Dominican Republic boxer (born 1989)

Personal information
- Nickname: El Abejón ("The Bumblebee")
- Born: July 15, 1989 (age 37) La Romana, Dominican Republic
- Height: 5 ft 7 in (170 cm)
- Weight: Featherweight; Super featherweight; Lightweight; Light welterweight

Boxing career
- Reach: 68 in (173 cm)
- Stance: Southpaw

Boxing record
- Total fights: 48
- Wins: 39
- Win by KO: 28
- Losses: 6
- Draws: 1
- No contests: 2

Javier Fortuna Francisco (born July 15, 1989) is a Dominican professional boxer. The WBA (Regular) super featherweight title from 2015 to 2016, and challenged for the IBF lightweight title in 2018.

== Early life ==
Fortuna was raised in La Romana, Dominican Republic, where he trained in boxing with his older brother, Jonathon Alexander Fortuna.

== Amateur career ==
Fortuna was a member of the Dominican National Team, and during his amateur career he won a Pan American silver medal and a gold medal at the Dominican National Championships.

== Professional career ==
Fortuna is promoted by Lou DiBella's company, DiBella Entertainment. In March 2011, Fortuna knocked out Florida prospect Derrick Wilson to win the WBC Youth Intercontinental Featherweight Championship. He later followed this up with a first-round knockout victory over prospect Yuandale Evans, and a second-round knockout over former IBF and IBO Featherweight Champion, Cristobal Cruz.

=== WBA interim featherweight title fight ===
On the undercard of Manny Pacquiao vs. Juan Manuel Marquez IV on December 8, 2012, Fortuna faced previously unbeaten Irish fighter Patrick Hyland for the WBA Interim Featherweight Title. Fortuna started fast, throwing power punches in bunches, but the Irishman stayed on his feet and began to put pressure on Fortuna. Fortuna seemed to fade late but had built enough of an early lead to earn a unanimous decision, and hand Hyland his first loss as a professional fighter.

=== WBA regular super featherweight title fight ===
On the undercard of Amir Khan vs. Chris Algieri on May 20, 2015, Fortuna faced the Costa Rican Bryan Vázquez for the WBA (Regular) Super Featherweight Title. Fortuna started strong, throwing a lot of punches and making Vasquez look slow. Fortuna kept his game plan until the last round and won his second world title as a professional.

In his first title defense, Fortuna faced Carlos Velasquez. Fortuna started strong, and managed to drop Velasquez in the second round. Fortuna continued to be in control for most of the fight and started punishing Velasquez badly, until the tenth round when the referee stepped in and waved off the fight.

On 20 January 2018 Fortuna was scheduled to fight Robert Easter Jr for his IBF lightweight belt. However, Fortuna was not able to make weight and Easter Jr's IBF belt was not on the line. Easter Jr ended up victorious, via a debatable split-decision. Two judges scored the fight in favor of the champion, 115-112 and 114-113 and one in favor of Fortuna 114–113.

On 16 June 2018 Fortuna battled Adrian Granados. In an accidental clash, Fortuna was pushed out of the ring and had to be carried out of the arena on a stretcher. The bout ended in a no-contest decision.

On 2 November 2019 Fortuna Jesus Cuellar and dominated him to a second-round TKO victory.

=== Fortuna vs. Campbell cancellation ===
Fortuna was supposed to face Luke Campbell on April 17, 2020, for the vacant WBC lightweight title, but the fight was cancelled due to the coronavirus pandemic.

=== Fortuna vs. Linares cancellation ===
Fortuna was scheduled to face former world champion Jorge Linares on August 28, 2020, but the fight was cancelled after Linares tested positive for COVID-19.

=== Fortuna vs. Garcia ===
On July 16, 2022, Fortuna fought Ryan Garcia at super lightweight in Crypto.Com Arena in Los Angeles, California. Garcia defeated Fortuna in 6 rounds via TKO.

== Professional boxing record ==
49 fights	39 wins	7 losses
By knockout	28	4
By decision	11	3
Draws	1	
No contests	2	

No.	Result	Record	Opponent	Type	Round, time	Date	Location	Notes
49	Loss	39–7–1 (2)	Rashidi Ellis	TKO	4 (10), 1:53	Nov 1, 2025	Mohegan Sun Arena, Uncasville, Connecticut, U.S.	
48	Loss	39–6–1 (2)	Alfredo Santiago	TKO	9 (10), 0:01	Mar 1, 2025	Coliseo Tomas Dones, Fajardo, Puerto Rico	For WBO–NABO super lightweight title
47	Win	39–5–1 (2)	Jonatan Mariano	TKO	2 (6)	Dec 18, 2024	Coliseo de Boxeo Carlos Teo Cruz, Santo Domingo, Dominican Republic	
46	Loss	38–5–1 (2)	Robbie Davies Jr	PTS	10	Nov 1, 2024	The SSE Arena, Belfast, Northern Ireland, UK	
45	Win	38–4–1 (2)	Juan Medina	TKO	2 (10), 2:40	Sep 10, 2023	Palacio de los Deportes Virgilio Travieso Soto, Santo Domingo, Dominican Republic	
44	Loss	37–4–1 (2)	Ryan Garcia	KO	6 (12), 0:27	Jul 16, 2022	Crypto.com Arena, Los Angeles, California, U.S.	
43	Win	37–3–1 (2)	Rafael Hernandez	KO	1 (10), 2:49	Feb 20, 2022	Pabellon de Esgrima, Centro Olimpico, Santo Domingo, Dominican Republic	
42	Loss	36–3–1 (2)	Joseph Diaz	UD	12	Jul 9, 2021	Banc of California Stadium, Los Angeles, California, U.S.	For vacant WBC interim lightweight title
41	Win	36–2–1 (2)	Antonio Lozada Jr.	KO	6 (10), 2:34	Nov 21, 2020	Staples Center, Los Angeles, California, U.S.	
40	Win	35–2–1 (2)	Jesús Cuellar	TKO	2 (10), 2:01	Nov 2, 2019	MGM National Harbor, Oxon Hill, Maryland, U.S.	
39	Win	34–2–1 (2)	Sharif Bogere	UD	10	Feb 9, 2019	Dignity Health Sports Park, Carson, California, U.S.	
38	NC	33–2–1 (2)	Adrián Granados	ND	4 (10), 2:50	Jun 16, 2018	The Ford Center at The Star, Frisco, Texas, U.S.	Fortuna accidentally injured when he fell out of the ring
37	Loss	33–2–1 (1)	Robert Easter Jr.	SD	12	Jan 20, 2018	Barclays Center, New York City, New York, U.S.	For IBF lightweight title
36	Win	33–1–1 (1)	Nicolas Polanco	UD	10	Sep 14, 2017	Hotel Jaragua, Santo Domingo, Dominican Republic	
35	Win	32–1–1 (1)	Mario Beltre	TKO	2 (10), 2:59	Jun 24, 2017	Hotel Jaragua, Santo Domingo, Dominican Republic	
34	Win	31–1–1 (1)	Omar Douglas	UD	10	Nov 12, 2016	Liacouras Center, Philadelphia, Pennsylvania, U.S.	
33	Win	30–1–1 (1)	Marlyn Cabrera	TKO	2 (10), 2:04	Sep 24, 2016	Sambil Commercial Center, Santo Domingo, Dominican Republic	
32	Loss	29–1–1 (1)	Jason Sosa	TKO	11 (12), 0:45	Jun 24, 2016	Capital Gym, Beijing, China	Lost WBA (Regular) super featherweight title
31	Win	29–0–1 (1)	Carlos Velásquez	TKO	10 (12), 0:35	Sep 29, 2015	Palms Casino Resort, Las Vegas, Nevada	Retained WBA (Regular) super featherweight title
30	Win	28–0–1 (1)	Bryan Vázquez	UD	12	May 29, 2015	Barclays Center, New York City, New York, U.S.	Won WBA (Regular) super featherweight title
29	Win	27–0–1 (1)	Miguel Taveras	RTD	1 (10), 3:00	Dec 22, 2014	Polideportvo Eleoncio Mercedes, La Romana, Dominican Republic	
28	Win	26–0–1 (1)	Abner Cotto	KO	5 (10), 1:32	Nov 1, 2014	UIC Pavilion, Chicago, Illinois, U.S.	
27	Win	25–0–1 (1)	Juan Antonio Rodriguez	UD	10	May 31, 2014	Tropicana Las Vegas, Las Vegas, Nevada, U.S.	
26	Win	24–0–1 (1)	Francisco Lorenzo	TKO	4 (10), 3:00	Mar 10, 2014	Polideportvo Eleoncio Mercedes, La Romana, Dominican Republic	
25	Win	23–0–1 (1)	Manuel Castro	TKO	3 (8)	Nov 16, 2013	El Domo, San Luis Potosí, Mexico	
24	Draw	22–0–1 (1)	Luis Franco	SD	10	Aug 2, 2013	Buffalo Run Casino, Miami, Oklahoma, U.S.	
23	Win	22–0 (1)	Miguel Zamudio	KO	1 (12), 1:08	Apr 19, 2013	Tropicana Atlantic City, Atlantic City, New Jersey, U.S.	
22	Win	21–0 (1)	Patrick Hyland	UD	12	Dec 8, 2012	MGM Grand Garden Arena, Las Vegas, Nevada, U.S.	Won interim WBA featherweight title
21	Win	20–0 (1)	Cristobal Cruz	TKO	2 (10), 2:22	Jul 6, 2012	Hard Rock Hotel and Casino, Las Vegas, Nevada, U.S.	
20	Win	19–0 (1)	Yuandale Evans	TKO	1 (10)	Apr 27, 2012	Frank Erwin Center, Austin, Texas, U.S.	
19	Win	18–0 (1)	Miguel Roman	UD	10	Dec 16, 2011	Mandalay Bay Resort & Casino, Las Vegas, Nevada, U.S.	
18	Win	17–0 (1)	Leopoldo Arrocha	RTD	2 (6), 3:00	Nov 6, 2011	Hard Rock Hotel & Casino, Punta Cana, Dominican Republic	
17	Win	16–0 (1)	Geyci Lorenzo	TKO	1 (10), 2:39	Sep 19, 2011	Polideportvo Eleoncio Mercedes, La Romana, Dominican Republic	Retained WBC Youth Intercontinental featherweight title
16	Win	15–0 (1)	Hugo Orlando Gomez	UD	10	May 13, 2011	Palacio Contador Gastón Guelfi, Montevideo, Uruguay	
15	Win	14–0 (1)	Derrick Wilson	KO	8 (10), 2:28	Mar 12, 2011	Foxwoods Resort Casino, Mashantucket, Connecticut, U.S.	Won vacant WBC Youth Intercontinental featherweight title
14	Win	13–0 (1)	Victor Valenzuela	KO	1 (8), 1:10	Dec 1, 2010	BB King Blues Club & Grill, New York City, New York, U.S.	
13	Win	12–0 (1)	Gregorio Torres	UD	6	Oct 29, 2010	Gimnasio de Mexicali, Mexicali, Mexico	
12	Win	11–0 (1)	Cristian Martinez	TKO	1 (8), 2:42	Sep 18, 2010	Coliseo Carlos 'Teo' Cruz, Santo Domingo, Dominican Republic	
11	NC	10–0 (1)	Francisco Lorenzo	NC	1 (8), 0:30	Aug 19, 2010	Dominican Fiesta Hotel & Casino, Santo Domingo, Dominican Republic	For vacant WBA Fedebol super featherweight title
10	Win	10–0	William Tapia	TKO	1 (6), 2:02	Jul 3, 2010	Pabellon de Balonmano, Santo Domingo, Dominican Republic	
9	Win	9–0	Juan Carlos Rosario	TKO	2 (6), 2:51	Mar 12, 2010	Sosua Bay Grand Casino, Puerto Plata, Dominican Republic	
8	Win	8–0	Miguelo Tavarez	TKO	1 (6), 0:30	Dec 21, 2009	Coliseo Carlos Teo Cruz, Santo Domingo, Dominican Republic	
7	Win	7–0	Alejandro Lebron	UD	6	Nov 16, 2009	Coliseo Carlos Teo Cruz, Santo Domingo, Dominican Republic	
6	Win	6–0	Carlos Diaz	UD	4	Sep 26, 2009	UVI Sports & Fitness Center, Charlotte Amalie, U.S. Virgin Islands	
5	Win	5–0	Luis Sosa	KO	1 (6), 0:34	Aug 22, 2009	Polideportivo, Nagua, Dominican Republic	
4	Win	4–0	Ambiorix Ciriaco	KO	2 (4)	Jul 25, 2009	Gimnasio Pina Acevedo, Santo Domingo, Dominican Republic	
3	Win	3–0	Jose Vidal Sanchez	TKO	2 (4)	Jun 29, 2009	Coliseo Carlos Teo Cruz, Santo Domingo, Dominican Republic	
2	Win	2–0	Cristian Martinez	TKO	1 (4), 2:32	May 16, 2009	Gimnasio Miguelito Rueda, Santo Domingo, Dominican Republic	
1	Win	1–0	Ricardo Johnson	KO	1 (4)	Mar 30, 2009	Coliseo Carlos Teo Cruz, Santo Domingo, Dominican Republic	

Sporting positions
Interim world boxing titles
Vacant Title last held by Yuriorkis Gamboa	WBA featherweight champion Interim title December 8, 2012 - April 18, 2013; Stripped	Vacant Title next held by Jesus Cuellar
World boxing titles
Vacant Title last held by Yodsanan Sor Nanthachai	WBA super featherweight champion Regular Title; May 29, 2015 - June 24, 2016	Succeeded by Jason Sosa
