= Terry Magee =

Irish boxer (born 1964)

Personal information
- Nationality: Irish
- Born: Terry Magee; 1 November 1964 (age 61) Belfast, Northern Ireland
- Weight: Light Middleweight

Boxing career
- Stance: Orthodox

Boxing record
- Total fights: 34
- Wins: 21
- Win by KO: 7
- Losses: 12
- Draws: 1
- No contests: 0

Terry Magee (born 1 November 1964, Belfast) is a retired professional Irish boxer. Magee, the older brother of Eamonn and Noel, fought at Light Middleweight but also fought at heavier weights towards the end of his career.

== Background ==
Magee grew up in the nationalist Ardoyne area of Belfast and came from a boxing obsessed family. Magee's younger brother Eamonn stated that for his mother "boxing was as important as school". Magee's three younger brothers were also boxers with two of them, Eamonn and Noel, having careers as professional boxers and both becoming Commonwealth champions.

Magee travelled to Wales in the 1970s to fight in an international schoolboy tournament and liked the place so much that he stayed and settled in Betws and continued to box with the Towy Boxing Club. Magee based his boxing career from his Welsh base and after his professional career was over he continued to train young boxers and the Towy ABC as well as undertake charity work for the "Get Kids Going" charity. In 2001, Carmarthenshire County Council named Magee their "Volunteer of the Year".
