= Andy Murray (boxer) =

Irish boxer (born 1982)

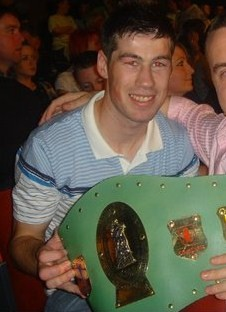
- Murray in 2008

Personal information
- Nickname: The Quiet Man
- Nationality: Irish
- Born: Andrew Murray; 10 September 1982 (age 44) Cavan, Ireland
- Weight: Lightweight; Light-welterweight

Boxing career
- Stance: Orthodox

Boxing record
- Total fights: 26
- Wins: 25
- Win by KO: 12
- Losses: 1
Medal record
Men's amateur boxing
Representing Ireland
EU Championships
Bronze medal – third place	2003 Strasbourg	Light-welterweight

Andrew Murray (born 10 September 1982) is an Irish professional boxer who held the Irish lightweight title, having previously held the Irish light-welterweight title also. He is also a former European Union lightweight champion, and has challenged once for the European lightweight title.

== Amateur career ==
At the age of ten, Murray began boxing as an amateur at the Cavan ABC. Over the next twelve years he won three All-Ireland Senior titles and two Ulster Senior titles. Murray also represented in Ireland at national level winning a 4 Nations title and three gold medals for Ireland at the Multi-Nations tournaments. He also won the accolade of "Young Boxer of the Year" in 2003.

== Professional career ==
Murray became frustrated after failing to qualify for the Athens Olympics in 2004 and so decided to switch to the pro ranks and relocate to London under manager Michael Helliet.

Murray turned professional in March 2005, winning his first fight at the King's Hall, Belfast, County Antrim, Northern Ireland, in which he beat Welshman Jonathan Jones in a fourth-round knockout on a card that included Jim Rock, Neil Sinclair and Eamonn Magee.

Murray, who fought out of St. Albans near London, England, won his first nine pro fights and three by knockout. Having returned to his native Country and County to box, Murray signed a promotional deal with Brian Peters Promotions and moved to John Breen's gym in Belfast. Murray was nominated in the 'Prospect of the Year' category for the 2008 Irish-boxing.com National Boxing Awards

Unfortunately, on 5 June 2011 he fought Gavin Rees of Wales and lost by Unanimous Decision. The Irish man fought well for the 12 rounds despite powerful punches coming from Rees throughout the fight.

== Irish light welterweight title ==
Murray won the vacant Irish light welterweight title on 8 December 2007. This win came with a controversial stoppage in round 4, Murray's opponent, James Gorman cut Murrays eyebrow area with what appeared to be head clashes. Gormans head made contact with Murrays face a number of times during the fight and the fight was stopped by referee David Irving in round 4. A rematch took place on 22 March 2008, in the National Stadium, Dublin, Ireland. Murray successfully defended his title on the night.

== Boxing titles ==
IBA Irish Light Welterweight Title - 8 December 2007

IBA Irish Lightweight Title - 12 July 2008

EBU-EU Lightweight Title - 21 March 2009
