= Jason Sosa =

American boxer (born 1988)

Personal information
- Nickname: El Canito
- Born: Jason Anthony Sosa; March 10, 1988 (age 38) Camden, New Jersey, U.S.
- Height: 5 ft 5 in (165 cm)
- Weight: Super-featherweight

Boxing career
- Reach: 67 in (170 cm)
- Stance: Orthodox

Boxing record
- Total fights: 32
- Wins: 24
- Win by KO: 17
- Losses: 4
- Draws: 4

Jason Sosa (born March 10, 1988) is an American professional boxer who held the WBA (Regular) super-featherweight title from 2016 to 2017.

== Professional boxing career ==
Sosa made his professional debut on November 20, 2009, defeating Jonathan Ocasio by stoppage in the third round at The Blue Horizon in Philadelphia, Pennsylvania, USA.

=== Sosa vs. Fortuna ===
He won the WBA (Regular) super-featherweight title on June 24, 2016 with an 11th round technical knockout win over defending champion Javier Fortuna at Capital Gym in Beijing.

=== Sosa vs. Smith ===
Sosa made his first title defense against Stephen Smith at Salle des Étoiles in Monte Carlo, Monaco, on November 12, 2016. He won via unanimous decision with the ringside judges' scorecards reading 117–110, 116-112 and 116–111.

=== Sosa vs. Lomachenko ===
After vacating the title on February 15, 2017, he fought WBO super-featherweight champion Vasyl Lomachenko in his next bout at MGM National Harbor in Oxon Hill, Maryland, USA, on April 8, 2017. Sosa retired on his stool at the end of the ninth round.

=== Sosa vs. Berchelt ===
Sosa challenged WBC super-featherweight champion Miguel Berchelt at Dignity Health Sports Park, Carson, California, USA, on November 2, 2019, losing by knockout in the fourth round.

== Professional boxing record ==
32 fights	24 wins	4 losses
By knockout	17	3
By decision	7	1
Draws	4	

No.	Result	Record	Opponent	Type	Round, time	Date	Location	Notes
32	Win	24–4–4	Farid Rodriguez	RTD	5 (6), 3:00	Jul 19, 2025	Coliseo Municipal, La Estrella, Colombia	
31	Loss	23–4–4	Miguel Berchelt	KO	4 (12), 2:56	Nov 2, 2019	Dignity Health Sports Park, Carson, California, U.S.	For WBC super-featherweight title
30	Win	23–3–4	Haskell Rhodes	TKO	7 (10), 0:07	Aug 10, 2019	Liacouras Center, Philadelphia, Pennsylvania, U.S.	
29	Win	22–3–4	Moises Delgadillo	UD	10	Jan 18, 2019	Turning Stone Resort & Casino, Verona, New York, U.S.	
28	Win	21–3–4	Reynaldo Blanco	UD	8	Aug 18, 2018	Ocean Resort Casino, Atlantic City, U.S.	
27	Loss	20–3–4	Yuriorkis Gamboa	MD	10	Nov 25, 2017	The Theater at Madison Square Garden, New York City, New York, U.S.	
26	Loss	20–2–4	Vasiliy Lomachenko	RTD	9 (12), 3:00	Apr 8, 2017	MGM National Harbor, Oxon Hill, Maryland, U.S.	For WBO super-featherweight title
25	Win	20–1–4	Stephen Smith	UD	12	Nov 12, 2016	Salle des Étoiles, Monte Carlo, Monaco	Retained WBA (Regular) super-featherweight title
24	Win	19–1–4	Javier Fortuna	TKO	11 (12), 0:45	Jun 24, 2016	Capital Gym, Beijing, China	Won WBA (Regular) super-featherweight title
23	Draw	18–1–4	Nicholas Walters	MD	10	Dec 19, 2015	Turning Stone Resort & Casino, Verona, New York, U.S.	
22	Win	18–1–3	Jorge Pazos	KO	6 (8), 0:32	Oct 2, 2015	2300 Arena, Philadelphia, Pennsylvania, U.S.	
21	Win	17–1–3	Jerry Belmontes	KO	1 (8), 2:39	Aug 15, 2015	Coliseo Rubén Rodríguez, Bayamón, Puerto Rico	
20	Win	16–1–3	Santiago Bustos	TKO	5 (8), 2:27	Jun 13, 2015	The Theater at Madison Square Garden, New York City, New York, U.S.	
19	Win	15–1–3	Herbert Quartey	TKO	1 (6), 2:23	Apr 25, 2015	Coliseo Mario Morales, Guaynabo, Puerto Rico	
18	Win	14–1–3	Bergman Aguilar	TKO	4 (8), 1:54	Mar 6, 2015	2300 Arena, Philadelphia, Pennsylvania, U.S.	
17	Win	13–1–3	Juan G Cruz	TKO	2 (6), 2:41	Oct 18, 2014	Coliseo Cosme Beitiá Salamo, Cataño, Puerto Rico	
16	Win	12–1–3	Michael Brooks	KO	9 (10), 2:27	Apr 12, 2014	Bally's Event Center, Atlantic City, New Jersey, U.S.	
15	Win	11–1–3	Bryne Green	KO	4 (6), 2:36	Nov 16, 2013	Sands Bethlehem Event Center, Bethlehem, Pennsylvania, U.S.	
14	Win	10–1–3	Tyrone Luckey	KO	2 (8), 2:58	Sep 26, 2013	Sands Bethlehem Event Center, Bethlehem, Pennsylvania, U.S.	
13	Win	9–1–3	Georgi Kevlishvili	KO	4 (8), 2:21	Jun 1, 2013	Bally's Event Center, Atlantic City, New Jersey, U.S.	
12	Win	8–1–3	Joseph Perez	TKO	4 (6), 2:10	Jan 19, 2013	Mohegan Sun Casino, Uncasville, Connecticut, U.S.	
11	Win	7–1–3	Isaac Suarez	TKO	2 (6), 2:10	Dec 8, 2012	McGonigle Hall, Philadelphia, Pennsylvania, U.S.	
10	Win	6–1–3	Clinton B. Douglas	TKO	3 (6), 1:17	Oct 12, 2012	National Guard Armory, Philadelphia, Pennsylvania, U.S.	
9	Win	5–1–3	Esteban Rodriguez	MD	4	Sep 21, 2012	Sands Bethlehem Event Center, Bethlehem, Pennsylvania, U.S.	
8	Draw	4–1–3	Angel Luis Ocasio	MD	8	Apr 20, 2012	National Guard Armory, Philadelphia, Pennsylvania, U.S.	
7	Draw	4–1–2	Angel Luis Ocasio	MD	6	Jan 13, 2012	National Guard Armory, Philadelphia, Pennsylvania, U.S.	
6	Win	4–1–1	Anthony Allen	UD	4	Oct 28, 2011	Bally's Event Center, Atlantic City, New Jersey, U.S.	
5	Loss	3–1–1	Tre'Sean Wiggins	TKO	1 (4), 2:02	Sep 25, 2010	Bally's Event Center, Atlantic City, New Jersey, U.S.	
4	Win	3–0–1	Clinton B. Douglas	UD	4	Jul 9, 2010	Boardwalk Hall, Atlantic City, New Jersey, U.S.	
3	Draw	2–0–1	Jose Ortiz	SD	4	May 7, 2010	South Philly Arena, Philadelphia, Pennsylvania, U.S.	
2	Win	2–0	Ramon Ellis	UD	4	Mar 26, 2010	Hamilton Manor, Hamilton Township, New Jersey, U.S.	
1	Win	1–0	Jonathan Ocasio	TKO	3 (4), 1:13	Nov 20, 2009	The Blue Horizon, Philadelphia, Pennsylvania, U.S.	

Sporting positions
World boxing titles
Preceded by Javier Fortuna	WBA super featherweight champion Regular Title; June 24, 2016 – February 15, 2017; Vacated	Vacant Title next held by Alberto Machado
