= Vince Feeney =

Irish boxer

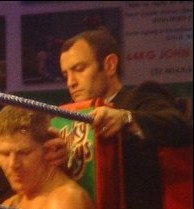

Personal information
- Nickname: The Sligo Kid
- Nationality: Irish
- Born: Vincent Feeney; 12 May 1973 (age 53) Sligo, Ireland
- Weight: bantamweight

Boxing career
- Stance: southpaw

Boxing record
- Total fights: 21
- Wins: 14
- Win by KO: 2
- Losses: 6
- Draws: 1
- No contests: 0

Vincent Feeney (born 12 May 1973, Sligo), is a retired Irish professional boxer, nicknamed "the Sligo Kid", hailing from the Maugheraboy area of Sligo Town. For the majority of his professional career, Feeney fought in the bantamweight division but also competed at divisions either side.

== Background ==
=== Amateur career ===
Feeney began boxing as an amateur at the age of 14 under the tutelage of Christy Houze, at the Innisfree Boxing Club in Sligo. During his time under Houze he won three Connacht titles and an All-Ireland title.

He continued his boxing education in Dublin with Paddy Keogh and won a further three All-Ireland titles along with Leinster and Dublin titles as well as representing Ireland in the national team.

Feeney, who was mentored by his father, John, then moved to London to further his career. On his first day in London the pair visited the Thomas A Beckett Gym on the Old Kent Road in south east London and Feeney was invited by trainer Howard Rainey to return the following day to try out as a professional.

The next day Feeney sparred for six rounds with Colin McMillan, the then world featherweight champion. Feeney returned again to the gym the following day to be met by one of his childhood hero's Barry McGuigan who supervised his workout and advised Feeney to become a professional stating that he had "the right style, having good upper body movement, good body shots and power" in his punches.

== Professional career ==
Feeney trained in Kilburn and fought out of his Neasden base in north west London. He had a bright start to his professional career but suffered from a number of controversial decisions which effected the progression of his career.

=== Debut ===
Feeney had his first professional fight in October 1992, which took place at the Bayswater Arena, London, England. In this fight Feeney drew with Bradford bantamweight Adey Benton over six rounds the undercard of a bill that included Cornelius Carr.

=== Title fights ===
==== WBC International bantamweight title ====
Feeney's first title fight came in December 1995 against Willy Perdomo of the Dominican Republic at the York Hall, Bethnal Green, London for the WBC International bantamweight title. Feeney come out to much fanfare with Irish dancers leading him, bedecked in tricolor poncho, headband and shorts, to the ring. However, after six furious rounds of boxing Perdomo overwhelmed Feeney and stop the Sligonian.

Feeney then won three fights in quick succession and earned a rematch with Perdomo in November 1996. Feeney featured on top of the bill again at the York Hall with a card that also featured Nikolai Valuev, John Ruiz and David Starie.

==== Southern Area bantamweight title ====
His next shot at a title came in April 1997 against Francis Ampofo at the York Hall, Bethnal Green, London for the vacant British southern area bantamweight title. Feeney defeated the London-based Ghana-born boxer on points over ten rounds.

==== Irish title controversy ====
Feeney then won a shot at the vacant Irish bantamweight title against Belfast's Tommy "Willo The Wisp" Waite. The fight took place in Waite's hometown on the undercard of the Darren Corbert v Robert Norton fight at the Maysfield Leisure Centre, Belfast. Going into the fight Feeney was the bookies' favourite; however Waite won the fight on points after ten rounds in what were controversial circumstances. The decision cost Feeney an opportunity of fighting for the European bantamweight title against Johnny Bredahl from Denmark.

When Feeney's manager Frank Maloney returned to Britain after signing a World Heavyweight unification fight deal between WBC champion Lennox Lewis and Evander Holyfield in Las Vegas he viewed a videotape of the fight. Maloney was so outraged by the decision that he stated he would be filing the strongest possible protest with both the British Boxing Board of Control and the Irish Boxing Board of Control as a result of the decision.

Maloney stated, "I have never seen such a diabolical decision in all my life. It was a disgrace. Letters of protest will be filed with the Irish boxing authority, the British Boxing Board of Control and the European Boxing Union. I will ask that they overturn the decision, declare the result void, a no contest".

=== Denied world title fight after brain scan ===
In May 1998, Feeney was due to defend his British southern area bantamweight title against Aldershot based super bantamweight John Matthews, however, he suffered a cut during training and had to postpone a fight. The bout was rescheduled to August 1998 and took place at the Town Hall, Acton, London on the bill dubbed "Double trouble". Feeney defeated Matthews on points over ten rounds to retain his southern area title and this led to Feeney getting a shot at a world title belt.

Feeney was to fly out to South Africa to challenge for the IBO super bantamweight title against Simon Ramoni. However, hours before Feeney was to board a flight at Heathrow Airport to Durban he received a report that an irregularity had shown up during his medical check and that he had failed a routine MRI scan which he had undertaken earlier that year. Feeney subsequently retired from professional boxing for health reasons.

== Post-retirement ==
In 1997, Feeney was voted Sligo Sports Person of the Year in the Boxing category. Since Feeney's retirement he has trained local youths at various Sligo boxing gyms and is employed as a Corner Inspector for the Boxing Union of Ireland during professional bouts.
