= Boxing Union of Ireland =

Governing body for professional boxing in Ireland

- Sport: Boxing
- Abbreviation: BUI
- Founded: 1980
- Affiliation: European Boxing Union; World Boxing Council; World Boxing Association
- Location: Dublin
- President: Mel André Christle
- Chairman: Francie McCullagh
- Secretary: Patricia Connolly
- Replaced: Irish Boxing Board of Control

Official website
- www.boxingunion.ie
- (Republic of Ireland)

The Boxing Union of Ireland (BUI) is the governing and sanctioning body for professional boxing in Ireland.

== Foundation and organisation ==
The BUI was founded in 1980, and replaced the BBBofC associated "Irish Boxing Board of Control", which had overseen professional boxing in Ireland through the 1960s and 1970s. The BUI is based at Chancery Place in Dublin and (as of 2017) the president was Brian McKeever.

Amateur boxing in Ireland is run by a separate organisation, the IABA, who operate on an all island basis.

== Legal case regarding the BUI and Deirdre Nelson ==
Deirdre Nelson was granted a professional boxing licence by the British Boxing Board of Control in February 1999, which gave her the right to box anywhere within the European Boxing Union. However, the Boxing Union of Ireland (BUI) forbid her to box until guidelines on women’s boxing were issued by the European Boxing Union in September 1999. In 2001 Nelson won a sex discrimination case against the BUI due to this; she was awarded £1,500 in compensation. The Employment Equality Authority (based in Dublin) stated that the BUI had discriminated against Nelson, violating the Employment Equality Act of 1977.

== Current Irish champions ==
Weight class:	Champion:	Reign began:
Flyweight	Vacant	—N/a
Super-flyweight	Vacant	—N/a
Bantamweight	Vacant	—N/a
Super-bantamweight	Matty Boreland	13 September 2025
Featherweight	Vacant	
Super-featherweight	Colm Murphy	July 1 2023
Lightweight	Gary Cully	1 February 2020
Light-welterweight	Evan Dalton	12 July 2025
Welterweight	Senan Kelly	4 October 2024
Light-middleweight	Craig O'Brien	3 March 2018
Middleweight	Paul Ryan	4 April 2026
Super-middleweight	Colly Condon	28 December 2022
Light-heavyweight	Rob “Snags” Molloy	16 August 2024
Cruiserweight	Vacant	—N/a
Heavyweight	Stephen Donfenobache Fennessy	10 October 2025

== Former champions ==
=== Bantamweight ===
Name	Duration of reign	Defences
Hugh Russell	5 October 1982 – (Vacated)	0
Tommy Waite	20 December 1997 – (Vacated)	0
Colin Moffett	15 December 2007 – (Vacated)	0

=== Super-bantamweight ===
Name	Duration of reign	Defences
Paul Hyland	5 July 2008 – (Vacated)	1

=== Featherweight ===
Name	Duration of reign	Defences
Jon Jo Irwin	16 March 1993 – (Vacated)	0
Patrick Hyland	19 April 2008 – (Vacated)	1
Marco McCullough	19 October 2013 – (Vacated)	0

=== Super-featherweight ===
Name	Duration of reign	Defences
Pat Doherty	26 March 1988 – (Vacated)	0
Kevin O'Hara	19 April 2008 – (Vacated)	0
Mickey Coveney	12 August 2011 – 3 November 2012	0
Anthony Cacace	3 November 2012 – (Vacated)	0
James Tennyson	27 April 2013 – (Vacated)	0
James Tennyson	10 March 2017 – present	0

=== Lightweight ===
Name	Duration of reign	Defences
Peter McDonagh	28 January 2006 – 12 July 2008	0
Andrew Murray	12 July 2008 – (Vacated)	1
Gary Cully	1 February 2020 – (Current)	0

=== Light-welterweight ===
Name	Duration of reign	Defences
PJ Davitt	14 December 1982 – (Vacated)	0
Gary Muir	3 December 1985 – (Vacated)	0
Malcolm Melvin	16 March 1993 – (Vacated)	0
Eamonn Magee	22 May 1999 – (Vacated)	0
Robert Murray	24 May 2005 – (Vacated)	0
Oisin Fagan	3 June 2006 – (Vacated)	0
Andrew Murray	8 December 2007 – (Vacated)	0
Frankie Gavin	18 September 2010 – (Vacated)	0

=== Welterweight ===
Name	Duration of reign	Defences
Tony Sinnott	24 September 1989 – (Vacated)	0
Billy Walsh	26 January 2008 – 7 February 2009	0
Stephen Haughian	7 February 2009 – (Vacated)	0
Peter McDonagh	6 November 2015 – present	0

=== Super-welterweight ===
Name	Duration of reign	Defences
Terry Magee	23 June 1987 – (Vacated)	0
Jim Webb	3 December 1998 – (Vacated)	0
Jim Rock	15 April 2000 – (Vacated)	0
Ciaran Healy	8 December 2007 – 5 July 2008	0
Jamie Moore	5 July 2008 – (Vacated)	0
Neil Sinclair	15 May 2009 – (Vacated)	0
Lee Murtagh	21 July 2012 – (Vacated)	1
Peter McDonagh	15 March 2014 – (Vacated)	1
Dee Walsh	22 November 2014 – (Vacated)	0
Paul Upton	23 April 2016 – present	0

=== Middleweight ===
Name	Duration of reign	Defences
Johnny Curran	27 September 1888 – (Vacated)	0
Myler Keogh	21 December 1896 – (Vacated)	1
Jem Roche	25 September 1900 – (Vacated)	0
Dan Grant	22 October 1908 – (Vacated)	0
Tommy Connolly	30 July 1927 – (Vacated)	0
Paddy Roche	19 December 1939 – (Vacated)	0
Pat O'Connor	4 February 1944 – (Vacated)	0
Bert Hyland	23 June 1949 – (Vacated)	0
Cliff Garvey	22 July 1955 – (Vacated)	0
Peter Sharpe	21 February 1967 – (Vacated)	0
Sam Storey	25 April 1987 – 18 March 1988	0
Steve Collins	18 March 1988 – (Vacated)	0
Darren Sweeney	15 April 1997 – (Vacated)	0
Matthew Macklin	14 May 2005 – (Vacated)	0
Jim Rock	3 June 2006 – (Vacated)	0
Gary O'Sullivan	4 December 2009 – (Vacated)	1
Eamonn O'Kane	12 July 2013 – (Vacated)	0

=== Super-middleweight ===
Name	Duration of reign	Defences
Ray Close	31 October 1989 – (Vacated)	1
Jim Rock	17 April 1999 – (Vacated)	1
Andy Lee	15 December 2007 – (Vacated)	0
Anthony Fitzgerald	13 February 2010 – (Vacated)	3
JJ McDonagh	25 February 2012 – present	1

=== Light-heavyweight ===
Name	Duration of reign	Defences
Harry Cowap	22 April 1985 – (Vacated)	1
Jason McKay	11 November 2006 – (Vacated)	0
Jim Rock	12 July 2008 – (Vacated)	0
John Waldron	15 May 2010 – 20 November 2010	0
Ciaran Healy	20 November 2010 – (Vacated)	0
Paddy McDonagh	21 January 2012 – present	0

=== Cruiserweight ===
Name	Duration of reign	Defences
Darren Corbett	5 November 1996 – (Vacated)	2
Ian Tims	19 March 2011 – (Vacated)	0

=== Heavyweight ===
Name	Duration of reign	Defences
Gordon Ferris	22 September 1980 – (Vacated)	0
Kevin McBride	2 June 1997 – (Vacated)	0
Coleman Barrett	13 February 2010 – (Vacated)	0
Tyson Fury	14 April 2012 – (Vacated)	0
