= St Bede's Catholic High School, Lytham St Annes =

St Bede's Catholic High School

Location
- Talbot Road; Lytham; Lytham St Annes; Lancashire, FY8 4JL; England
- 53.74366°N 2.95426°W

Information
- Type: Voluntary aided school
- Religious affiliation: Roman Catholic
- Established: 1961
- Local authority: Lancashire
- Department for Education URN: 119788 Tables
- Ofsted: Reports
- Headteacher: Paul Marsden
- Gender: Coeducational
- Age: 11 to 16
- Enrolment: 822 as of December 2022
- Website: http://www.stbedeslytham.lancs.sch.uk/

St Bede's Catholic High School is a coeducational secondary school located in the Lytham area of Lytham St Annes in the English county of Lancashire.

Established in 1961, it is a voluntary aided school administered by Lancashire County Council and the Roman Catholic Diocese of Lancaster. The school offers GCSEs as programmes of study for pupils, and offers The Duke of Edinburgh's Award as an extra-curricular activity. St Bede's was also previously awarded specialist status as a Business and Enterprise College.

== Notable former pupils ==
- Joe Cardle, footballer
- Scott Cardle, boxer
- Jeff Thomas, boxer
- Stephen Tompkinson, actor
- Joe Riley, footballer
