= Enzo Calzaghe =

Boxing coach

Enzo Calzaghe MBE
Personal information
- Nationality: Italian/British
- Born: 1 January 1949 Sassari, Italy
- Died: 17 September 2018 (aged 69) United Kingdom

Boxing career

Pietro Vincenzo "Enzo" Calzaghe MBE (1 January 1949 – 17 September 2018) was an Italian-born British boxing trainer. He was the father of Joe Calzaghe and the head trainer for Team Calzaghe at the Newbridge boxing club. He, along with son Joe, was a co-founder of Calzaghe Promotions.

== Early life ==
Calzaghe was born in Bancali, a hamlet of Sassari, in the Italian island of Sardinia to parents Giuseppe and Victoria. He moved at the age of two, with his family, to Bedfordshire. Whilst there he attended school alongside Hungarian-born Joe Bugner, who would later become a European heavyweight champion boxer. Calzaghe's father taught him to box to protect himself from school bullies. The family returned to Italy when Calzaghe was 13 and whilst there he tried to make a career as a footballer - at one point he played on the same team as Gianfranco Zola. Calzaghe said of his early life: "Where I come from, in Sardinia, boys like me either became waiters, boxers or footballers. Well, I didn’t end up as any of them – although I’ve had a go at most".

== Children ==
He has three daughters named Sonia, Melissa and Annmarie, and one son called Joe.

== Travelling across Europe ==
Calzaghe played the bass guitar for his uncle's band 'Survival'. He was conscripted into the Italian Air Force at the age of 19 and immediately found a place in their Milan football team, where he spent much of the next two years. Upon completing his national service in 1969, Calzaghe decided to travel around Europe, making money as a busker. He hitch-hiked from one city to the next for the next couple of years, often sleeping rough in city squares and phone-boxes. After being abandoned by a travelling companion in Amsterdam he traded his ring for a passage on a tomato ship to Whitstable, from where he travelled to Bournemouth where his aunt ran a restaurant his brother Antonio worked for. His aunt had sold the business to return to Italy but convinced the new owner to take him on as an employee. Calzaghe worked at the restaurant during the day and slept there at night, in order to save up enough money to go back home to Sardinia. He saved the cash but, when he got to Southampton station, the tannoy announced a train to Cardiff was due. In Calzaghe's words: "Sod going home, let's try Cardiff".

In Cardiff Calzaghe found work at a Wimpy where he fell in love with a waitress, Jackie, who would become his wife just four weeks later. They moved in with Jackie's parents in Markham before getting a house near Blackwood that was near to a boxing gym. Calzaghe was, at the time, working variously as a bus conductor and window salesman whilst also playing in bands with his brother.

== Boxing ==
Whilst in Cardiff, Calzaghe got involved in the local boxing gym and met Paul Williams, who was trainer of the Newbridge boxing club. Williams invited Calzaghe to bring Calzaghe's son Joe along as he was being bullied at school. Joe became a regular at the gym and Calzaghe became Paul's assistant trainer." Williams retired when Joe was 18 and Enzo took over the gym, which he ran until 2002. Calzaghe also won 'Coach of the Year' at the BBC Sports Personality awards, The Ring magazine trainer of the year for 2007, and the Futch–Condon Award, awarded by the Boxing Writers Association of America, for Trainer of the Year 2007. He effectively retired from coaching in 2008, though his gym continued.

== Legacy and death ==
A special ceremony was arranged for Calzaghe to be awarded an MBE in Ystrad Mynach, Caerphilly in 2010, presented by the Lord Lieutenant of Gwent, Simon Boyle, because Calzaghe was unable to attend the ceremony at Buckingham Palace. A bridge has been named in honour of Enzo and Joe in their home town of Newbridge. As well as Joe, Enzo had three daughters named Sonia, Melissa, and Annmarie, also 13 grandchildren, Joe Jr, Connor, Christopher, Chloe, Elysia, Dylan, Louisa, Jacques, Alba, Mya, William, Eryn, Leighton and two great grandsons Logan and Alfie. A granddaughter Elodie. He died on 17 September 2018, after a series of rumours regarding his health and false reports of his death on the preceding days.

== Fighters trained ==
Nationality	Name	Weight Division(s)	Titles held	Reference
(Wales)	Joe Calzaghe	Super-Middleweight and Light Heavyweight	BBBofC, WBO, WBA, WBC and IBF Super-Middleweight belts. The Ring Light-Heavyweight belt.	
(Wales) (Italy)	Enzo Maccarinelli	Cruiserweight	WBU, WBO, and EBU belts.	
(Wales)	Gavin Rees	Featherweight - Light Welterweight	WBO Inter-continental Featherweight, BBBoC Lightweight belt. WBA Light-Welterweight World Champion.	
(Wales)	Nathan Cleverly	Light-Heavyweight	Commonwealth, BBBoC, EBU, WBO and WBA Light-Heavy World Champion	
(Wales)	Bradley Pryce	Super-Featherweight - Light-Middleweight	WBO Inter-Continental Lightweight title, BBBoC Welterweight, WBU Light-Middleweight, Commonwealth Light-Middleweight,	
(Wales)	Gary Lockett	Middleweight		
