= Boxing Ireland =

Governing body for amateur boxing on the island of Ireland

- Sport: Amateur boxing
- Founded: 1911
- Affiliation: World Boxing; International Boxing Association (until 2024); Olympic Federation of Ireland
- Affiliation date: 2025
- Regional affiliation: Europe
- Headquarters: National Stadium, Dublin
- President: Gerry O'Mahony

Official website
- www.boxingireland.ie
- (Republic of Ireland)
- (Northern Ireland)

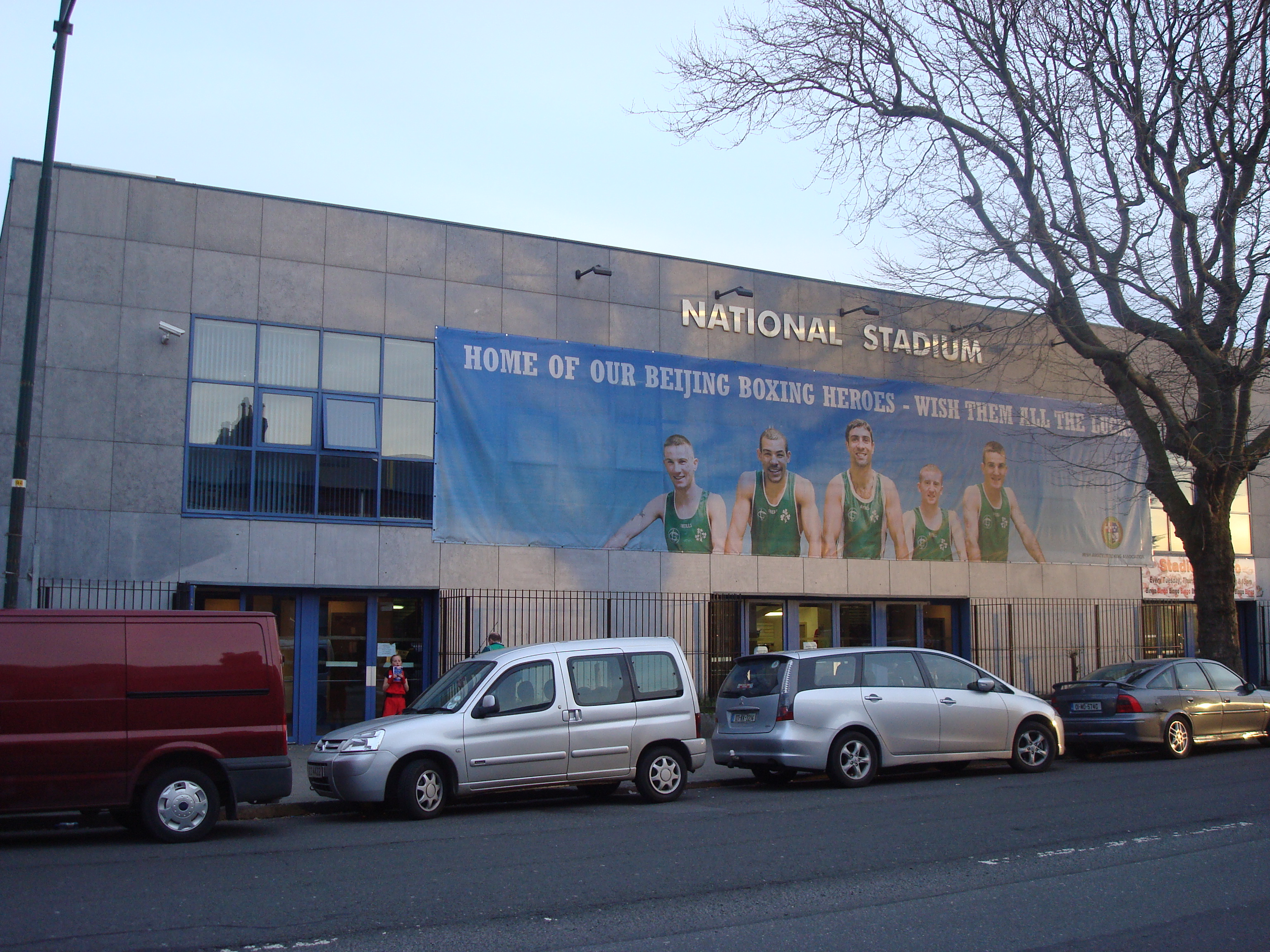
National Stadium in Dublin. Home to the only purpose built amateur boxing stadium in the world.

Boxing Ireland is the national governing body for amateur boxing on the island of Ireland, developing and controlling the sport. Founded in 1911, it operates from the National Stadium in Dublin.

Originally the Irish Amateur Boxing Association (IABA), it was renamed the Irish Athletic Boxing Association in 2016, and then Boxing Ireland in 2026.

In October 2024, an EGM of the association voted to disaffiliate from the International Boxing Association, on foot of a call from the International Olympic Committee to National Olympic Committees (NOCs) to cease their relationships with bodies affiliated with the IBA. On 22 May 2025, it joined World Boxing, and in January 2026 rebranded as Boxing Ireland.

== Structure ==
Boxing Ireland organises, develops, fosters and controls amateur boxing across Ireland (including Northern Ireland and the Republic of Ireland); it is the national governing body (NGB) for amateur boxing.

== History pre-1936 ==
The association was originally called the Irish Amateur Boxing Association.

== National Stadium ==
In 1935, Dep.Commissioner WRE Murphy first proposed a boxing stadium. In 1937, the IABA proposed to construct a stadium solely for the purposes of boxing.

In 1939, the National Stadium, located in Dublin, was completed and officially opened.

The IABA changed its company name from Irish Amateur Boxing Association to Irish Athletic Boxing Association (IABA) in January 2016, following a directive issued by AIBA, the international governing body, to all National Boxing Federations to remove the word 'Amateur' from the name of each individual Federation.

== Olympic success ==
Michael Carruth, Katie Taylor, and Kellie Harrington are the only Irish boxers to win a gold medal in the sport. Michael Carruth won gold at the 1992 Barcelona Olympics, and exactly 20 years to the week later, Katie Taylor won gold at the London 2012 Olympics. She was the first Irish woman to qualify and compete in an Olympic boxing event. Taylor won her Olympic debut over Great Britain's Natasha Jonas with a 26–15 score. An International Olympic Committee official said that the decibels hit 113.7 – the highest crowd levels recorded at London 2012 so far. Paddy Barnes made history in 2012 by being the first Irish boxer to ever win two Olympic Medals at two consecutive Olympics – only two Irish athletes have managed this. The team that represented Irish boxing at the London 2012 Olympics has been the most successful IABA boxing Olympic Team since the 1956 Melbourne Olympics. The London 2012 team consisted of:

- Darren O'Neill 75 kg Paulstown BC (Team Captain)
- Adam Nolan 69 kg Bray BC
- Katie Taylor 60 kg Bray BC
- John Joe Nevin 56 kg Cavan BC
- Michael Conlan 52 kg St John Bosco Belfast BC
- Paddy Barnes 49 kg Holy Family Belfast BC

== 2016 Rio Olympics ==
In October 2015 the head coach of the IABA's High Performance Unit, Billy Walsh, left for the US to train the USA women's team. Although discussions on a new contract for Walsh had been on-going for several months, Walsh claimed the IABA "changed their stance on virtually every detail" of a new contract offer. The Irish Sports Council (Sport Ireland) publicly blamed the IABA for the loss of Walsh. The IABA, in return, refuted what it called the "disgraceful allegations" of Sports Ireland and claimed that Walsh left for financial reasons, and that Sports Ireland was using this loss to take control of the IABA's High Performance Unit.

Ireland's performance in the 2016 Rio Olympics boxing events was unsuccessful, with Ireland not featuring in any medal positions, despite having a number of seeded boxers. The USA women's team had its best performance ever.

== Developments after 2016 Rio Olympics ==
In 2017 Sport Ireland published a review, the ‘Rio Review’, which said the boxing team's performance at the 2016 Games was not ‘a blip in an otherwise outstanding success story’ but the result of ‘underlying failings in the high performance programme.’ The 212-page review on Ireland's Olympic and Paralympic campaigns also said blaming the departure of head coach Billy Walsh, questionable judging decisions and a positive drugs test only masked ‘the real root causes.’ The Irish Athletic Boxing Association's (IABA) high performance funding for 2017 was cut by €200,000. Disagreements among senior members of the IABA has led to warnings from Sport Ireland that further steps will be taken against the IABA.

Successful Irish boxer Bernard Dunne (13 Irish amateur championships and the WBA Super Bantamweight world title in 2009) was appointed director of the high-performance unit in April 2017. The IABA also announced that their High Performance Unit would move to the Sport Ireland National Sports Campus on a permanent basis following the completion of an agreement with the Sport Ireland Institute.

In the following month the feud both within the IABA and with Sport Ireland flared up again, with two people claiming to be the chairman of the IABA: Dublin barrister Joe Christle and Waterford's David O’Brien. O'Brien claimed that a meeting of the board of directors was held on 27 March, which Joe Christle did not attend. The IABA president Pat Ryan did attend. O'Brien claimed that he was voted in as the chairman of the board of directors, as Christle's time on the board had finished, and he (O'Brien) called for both Christle and the CEO of the IABA, Fergal Carruth, to step down. Christle, in turn, claimed that the vote taken at that meeting was invalid, as there were insufficient members present to form a quorum. Joe Christle was recognised by Sport Ireland, while five members of the board of directors approved David O’Brien as an alternative chairman, leading to deep divisions within the body.

On 7 June both the minister for sport, Patrick O'Donovan, and John Treacy, Sport Ireland chief executive, said they recognised Christle as chairman. They set a 30th of June deadline for the IABA to get its act together and introduce a new rule book, which would ensure the autonomy of the High Performance Unit and ensure Dunne's sole right to make team selections in keeping with recommendations made in the post-Olympic ‘Rio Review’. In response, the following day IABA president Ryan penned a strongly worded letter to Christle, criticising many of Christle's recent decisions as well as outlining concerns in relation to the organisation's current leadership, among other issues.

One day later the IABA board of directors (a majority of whom supported Christle's position as chairman) published a statement replying to Pat Ryan's letter, which had been leaked. The statement was posted on the IABA website. The board members emphasised that they had received legal advice to support Christle's position as chairman. The board's statement also reiterated their intention to introduce a new IABA Rule Book as demanded by Sport Ireland.

== IABA Olympic medals ==
Olympic Games	Year	Location	Medal	Weight	Boxer	Club
1st	1952	(Finland) Helsinki	Silver	Bantam	John McNally	White City BC
2nd	1956	(Australia) Melbourne	Silver	Welter	Fred Tiedt	N/A
3rd	1956	(Australia) Melbourne	Bronze	Fly	John Caldwell	N/A
4th	1956	(Australia) Melbourne	Bronze	Bantam	Fred Gilroy	N/A
5th	1956	(Australia) Melbourne	Bronze	Light	Tony Byrne	N/A
6th	1964	(Japan) Tokyo	Bronze	Light	Jim McCourt	N/A
7th	1980	(Soviet Union) Moscow	Bronze	Fly	Hugh Russell	N/A
8th	1992	(Spain) Barcelona	Gold	Welter	Michael Carruth	Drimnagh BC
9th	1992	(Spain) Barcelona	Silver	Bantam	Wayne McCullough	N/A
10th	2008	(China) Beijing	Silver	Light Heavy	Kenneth Egan	Neilstown BC
11th	2008	(China) Beijing	Bronze	Middle	Darren Sutherland	St Saviours BC
12th	2008	(China) Beijing	Bronze	Light Fly	Paddy Barnes	Holy Family BC
13th	2012	(United Kingdom) London	Silver	Bantam	John Joe Nevin	Cavan BC
14th	2012	(United Kingdom) London	Gold	Light	Katie Taylor	Bray BC
15th	2012	(United Kingdom) London	Bronze	Fly	Michael Conlan (boxer)	St. John Bosco BC
16th	2012	(United Kingdom) London	Bronze	Light Fly	Paddy Barnes	Holy Family BC
17th	2021	(Japan) Tokyo	Gold	Light Welter	Kellie Harrington	St Mary's BC
18th	2021	(Japan) Tokyo	Bronze	Welter	Aidan Walsh (boxer)	Emerald ABC
19th	2024	(France) Paris	Gold	Light Welter	Kellie Harrington	St Mary's BC

== See also ==
- Boxing Union of Ireland
- Ireland at the Olympics
