= Jim Rock =

Irish boxer

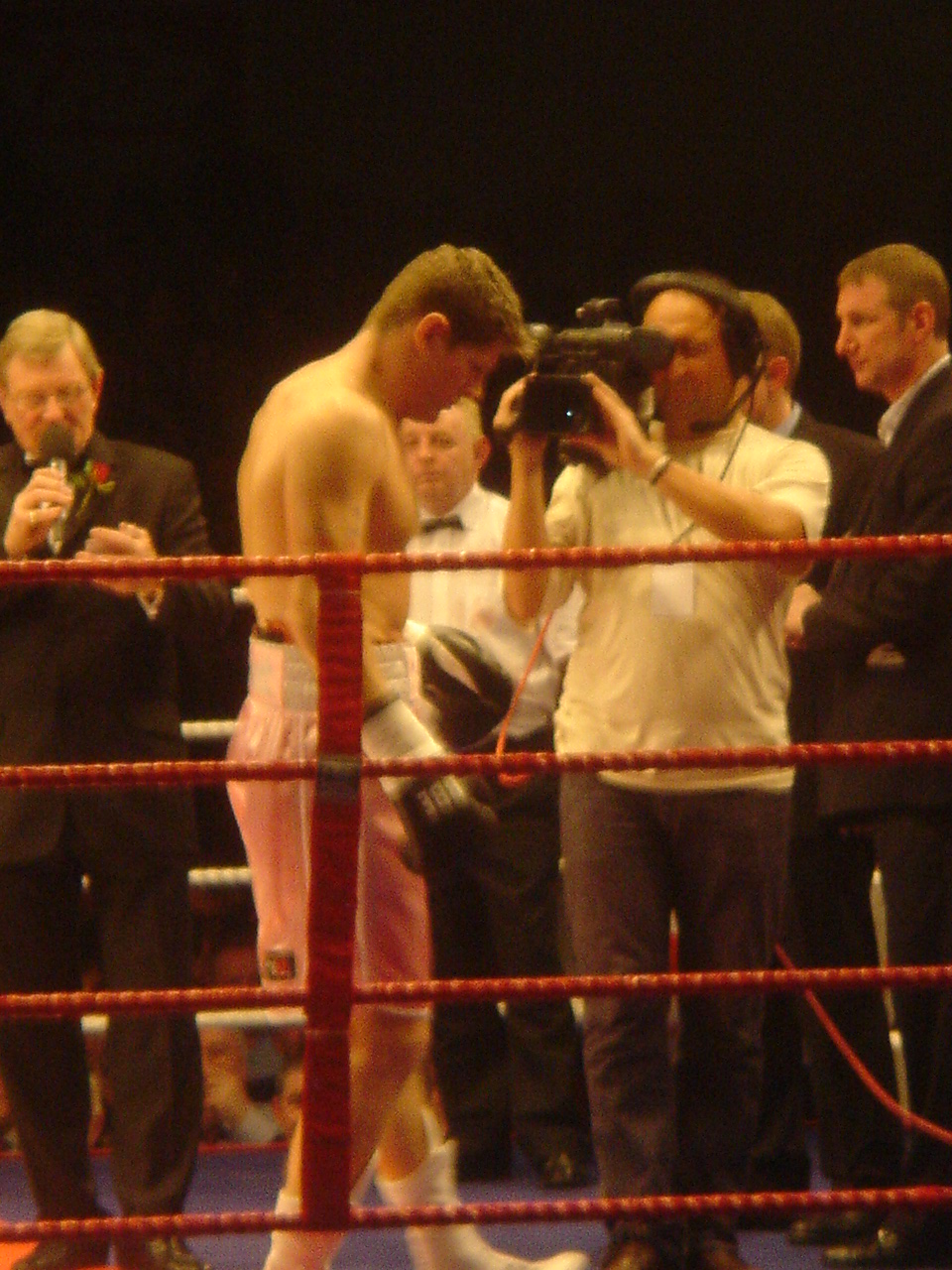
- Rock (centre) in 2006

Personal information
- Nickname: The Pink Panther
- Nationality: Irish
- Born: 12 March 1972 (age 54) Dublin, Ireland
- Height: 5 ft 11 in (180 cm)
- Weight: Light-middleweight; Middleweight; Super-middleweight; Light-heavyweight

Boxing career
- Stance: Orthodox

Boxing record
- Total fights: 34
- Wins: 30
- Win by KO: 12
- Losses: 4

Jim Rock (born 12 March 1972) is an Irish former professional boxer who competed from 1995 to 2009. He is the only boxer to have held the Irish title at four different weights divisions: light-middleweight, middleweight, super-middleweight and light-heavyweight.

== Background ==
=== Family ===
Rock was born into a large family in the Blanchardstown area of west Dublin. Rock is a cousin of former Irish welterweight champion Robbie Murray. Rock is now married with a young family.

=== TV and film ===
In 2003, Rock trained actor Matthew McConaughey in preparation for his role in the film Reign of Fire. In return, McConaughey worked Rock's corner during his victory over Jason Collins. Rock also trained Geri Halliwell from the Spice Girls in 1999 before they kicked of their world tour in the Point Depot in Dublin.

In March 2007, Rock fought a five-round exhibition fight in Dublin against former Olympic champion Michael Carruth.

Rock, along with Mick Dowling, co-presents boxing broadcasts for the Irish national television broadcaster, RTÉ.

== Boxing career ==
Rock boxed as an amateur prior to turning professional in November 1995. He won his first fight at the Point Depot in Dublin, beating the previously unbeaten Craig Lynch the undercard of a bill that included fellow Irish boxers Steve Collins and Eamonn Magee.

Rock was a veteran of the Dublin professional fight scene; however, he fought out of the Breen Gym in Belfast. Rock is a former WAA Inter-Continental European Super Middleweight, IBC Middleweight, WBF Continental European Light Middleweight, Irish Light Middleweight and Irish Super Middleweight title holder and Irish Middleweight title holder. However, arguably his biggest fight was against Margate based Iranian, Mehrdud "Takaloo" Takalobigashi for the WBU Light Middleweight title which took place in Belfast's Odyssey Arena in February 2003. Rock lost this keenly contested fight to an explosive overhand right knock out defeat in the ninth round.

== Brian Peters ==
Rock fought on Brian Peters promotions which were broadcast on Irish station RTÉ but he has since retired. Derry fighter John Duddy once displayed interest in taking on the Dubliner for the Irish middleweight title. Duddy's management attended Rock's 3 June 2006 fight against Kevin Phelan in Dublin, a seventh-round TKO victory for Rock. The fight was initially scheduled for 29 September 2006 at Madison Square Garden, but was then postponed, for a November 2006 bout in Dublin, Ireland which again did not materialise.

The speculation of a potential superfight against John Duddy continued into 2007 and a bill including a Duddy/Rock match up and a Bernard Dunne title defense was planned for late summer 2007. Ultimately, that fight never took place.

Rock was undefeated from 2003 until his retirement in 2009.
