= Eamonn Magee =

Irish boxer (born 1971)

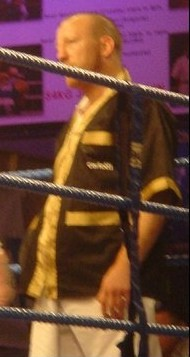
- Magee in the corner of Jim Rock, 2008

Personal information
- Nickname: The Terminator
- Nationality: Irish
- Born: 13 July 1971 (age 55) Belfast, Northern Ireland
- Height: 5 ft 8 in (173 cm)
- Weight: Light-welterweight; Welterweight

Boxing career
- Reach: 70 in (178 cm)
- Stance: Southpaw

Boxing record
- Total fights: 33
- Wins: 27
- Win by KO: 20
- Losses: 6
Medal record
Men's amateur boxing
Representing Ireland
Junior World Championships
Silver medal – second place	1989 Puerto Rico	Welterweight

Eamonn Magee (born 13 July 1971 in Belfast, Northern Ireland) is a retired WBU World Welterweight Boxing Champion who competed from 1995 to 2007 in the professional arena. He fought for and won the WBU World title in December 2003. He also held the Commonwealth Light-Welterweight title twice, and challenged for the European Light-Welterweight and British Welterweight titles. As an amateur, Magee won a bronze medal in the Welterweight division at the 1992 World Junior Championships and to this day remains one of Ireland's most successful amateur boxers of all time.

He was a veteran of the Irish and European professional fight scenes and fought out of the Breen Gym in Belfast, where he now works as an assistant trainer to John Breen.

== Biography ==
Magee grew up in the Ardoyne area of Belfast the youngest of four boys and was in and out of trouble as a youth. Magee came from a boxing obsessed family, at the age of twelve, Magee's mother enrolled him in the local boxing club. Magee stated that for his mother "boxing was as important as school". Magee's three older brothers were also boxers; two of them, Terry and Noel, having careers as professional boxers. His brother Noel was also a Commonwealth title champion.

In 1989, Magee was involved in a fight outside a restaurant and sustained a deep wound to his neck from which he almost died. On Halloween night 1992, known as the infamous "Night of The Long Knives", he was shot through his lower left leg by the Provisional Irish Republican Army (IRA) in a punishment attack for activities that might have brought attention from the British Army and threatened the security of the IRA. They originally intended to blow out his kneecap but his father pleaded that he be shot in the calf instead to keep his son's hope of becoming a world champion boxer alive. In 1994, Magee (who is a supporter of Celtic football club) was charged with affray after getting into a barroom brawl with a group of Rangers fans in a Belfast City Centre pub. In February 2004, Magee was attacked in the Blacks Road area of Belfast. He was pulled from his car and beaten, which broke two bones in one of his legs.

In February 2010, he was sentenced to six months imprisonment for assault after head-butting a man in north Belfast.

In June 2010, Magee was jailed for 12 months for an assault on his ex-partner. He was given the maximum sentence for the offence, but was released on bail pending an appeal.

In December 2010, Magee, who is facing charges of breaching a non-molestation order and harassing his ex-partner Maria Magill was arrested and brought back into custody after failing to sign with police on 28 December. During the court hearing it was reported that Magee is sometimes forced to "lock himself away from the world" due to mental health problems, depression and anxiety which he has suffered from for a long time. The judge, Mr Justice Weatherup, ruled that Magee could be released again on bail after pointing out that no known attempt had been made to contact Ms Magill.

A biography of Magee was published in 2018 titled The Lost Soul of Eamonn Magee and won the William Hill Sports Book of the Year.

== Amateur record ==
A left-hander, Magee boxed for Ireland as an amateur and, like his brother Noel, won a number of Irish national titles and won a silver medal at the World Junior Championships at San Juan, Puerto Rico in 1989. In 1992 & 1993, Magee won the Irish National Senior Light Welterweight title.

=== Barcelona Olympics nomination controversy ===
Because of his Irish title win, Magee should have automatically been nominated as the Irish entrant for the qualification tournament for the boxing event at the 1992 Olympics; however, a number of members from the Ulster Boxing Council abstained from voting for his nomination and this led to the Irish (IABA) selection team requesting that Magee fight a preliminary fight against Corkman Billy Walsh, a boxer whom he had already beaten to win the Irish title. In protest, Magee then turned down the chance to box off for the place, as he felt he was the automatic choice.

Magee's outlook on boxing was soured by this experience and he then took a sabbatical from the sport.

== Professional career ==
=== Debut ===
Magee turned professional in November 1995, winning his first fight at the Point Depot, in which he knocked out Hull based Liverpudlian Pete Roberts on a card that included Steve Collins and a debut fight for Dubliner Jim Rock.

=== Early fights ===
Magee's first twelve fights took place in a variety of locations such as the Republic of Ireland, Northern Ireland, US and England and against a variety of opposition including journeymen such as Steve McGovern, Kevin McKillan and Karl Taylor as well as future NABF Welter and Light Middleweight title holder Teddy Reid. The Reid fight which took place at The Roxy, Boston, USA, was Magee's only loss on his early record which tallied to 11 win, 9 within the distance and 1 loss.

=== Paul Burke Commonwealth title fights ===
Magee's chance to fight for his first title belt took place on 30 November 1998 when he challenged experienced Preston based fighter Paul Burke for his Commonwealth Light Welterweight Title in Manchester, England on the Mayhem in Manchester bill which included Howard Eastman, Steve Foster and Clinton Woods.

Before the fight Magee had stated that Burke was "old, slow journeyman. Paul is the sort who hangs in and takes far more punishment than he should. I'll do him a favour and get it over fast".

The fight went the twelve round distance and Burke beat Magee on a controversial points decision. Magee thought he had been let down badly by the British officials on the night and Chris Eubank also made his protest known. A journalist who was at ringside stated that it was one of the "most shocking decisions in British boxing history".

Within twelve months Magee had won two fights both by third round stoppages including winning the Irish Light Welterweight Title both the arranged rematch with Burke which was set for 12 September 1999 at the York Hall, Bethnal Green in London again for the Commonwealth Light Welterweight Title.

Magee's mind was on revenge and he floored the champion three times in the sixth round before star rated referee Dave Parris stopped the fight with Burke in no condition to continue.

Magee's sights were then set on a fight with Manchester's Ricky Hatton and continued his winning streak with a further ten straight wins, seven inside the distance, including wins over Kenya's Joseph Miyumo, Shea Neary and Jonathan Thaxton to line up a super-fight with Hatton.

=== Hatton fight ===
Magee's highest profile fight was against Ricky Hatton for the WBU Light Welterweight Title which took place at the Manchester Evening News Arena on 1 June 2002 and was billed as "Anarchy in the UK" and was a 20,000 ticket sell out.

The fight was one of the most eagerly awaited fights in European boxing for many years and there had been doubts that the fight would ever take place due to the MEN being booked and then an injury to Hatton's knuckle. Also Magee had trouble leading up to the fight when the Panamanian sparring partners that Magee had paid for were deported from Ireland after they arrived at Dublin Airport.

In what Hatton's trainer Billy Graham called Hatton's toughest fight, Magee knocked Hatton down for the first time in his career after only one minute of the fight in round one. Magee again pressurised Hatton in the second round and again Hatton looked shakey and in trouble. However, Hatton battled back keeping Magee on the ropes for much of the remainder of the fight. Magee eventually lost this keenly contested fight on points over 12 rounds.

His most recent fight took place 11 May 2007 and was a unanimous points loss to Kevin Anderson for the British welterweight title.
