= National Stadium (Ireland) =

Boxing stadium in Ireland

Coordinates: 53.330706°N 6.280323°W

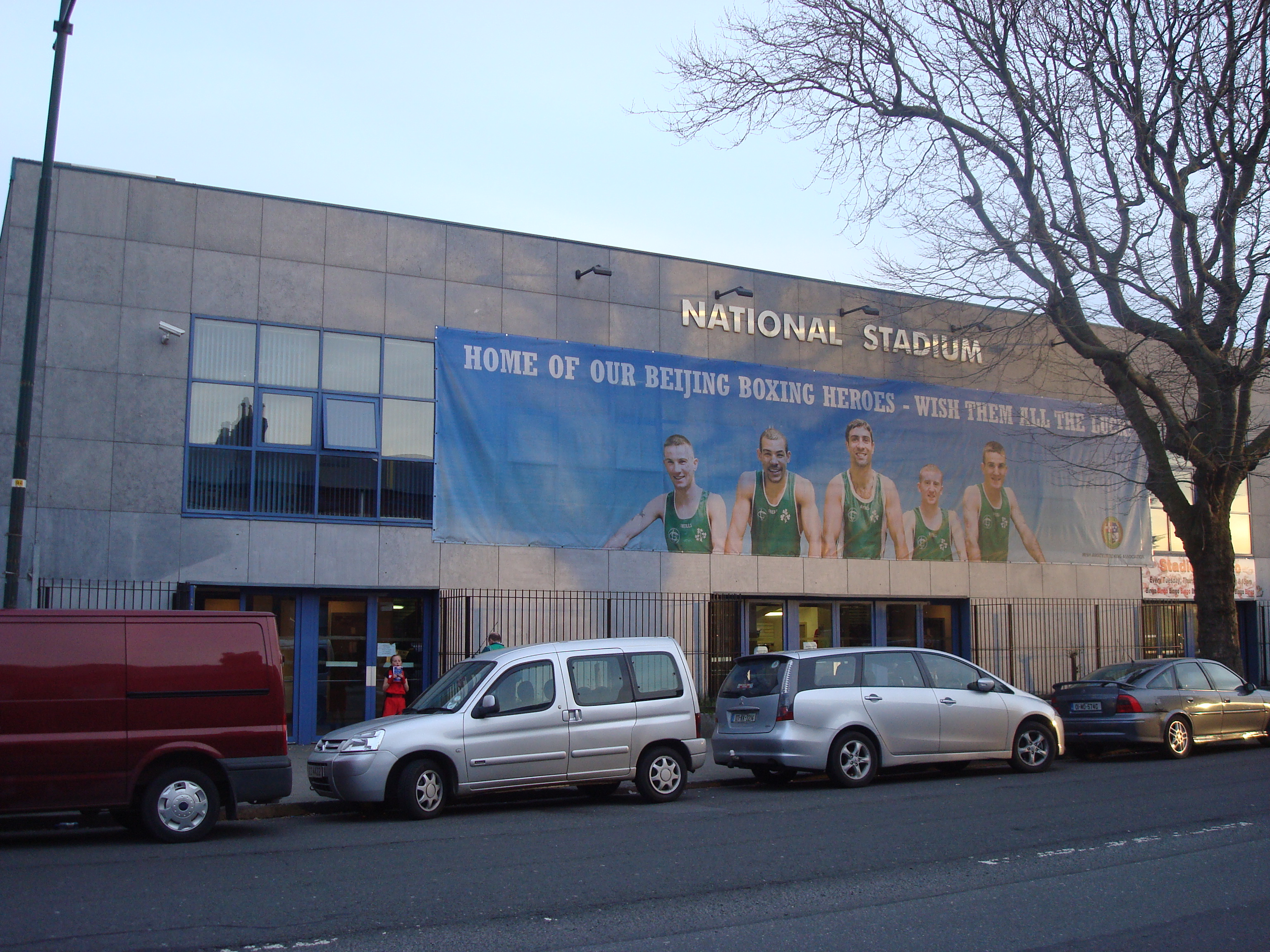
- Stadium exterior (2010)

- Location within Dublin

General information
- Type: Stadium
- Location: 145 South Circular Road; Dublin 8 D08 HY40; Ireland
- Opening: 1939
- Owner: IABA

Other information
- Seating capacity: 2,000

Website
- Venue website

The National Stadium (Irish: An Staid Náisiúnta) (often referred to as the National Boxing Stadium or the National Sporting Arena) in Dublin, Ireland, is a purpose-built boxing stadium built and operated by the Irish Athletic Boxing Association. Major General W. R. E. Murphy, Deputy Commissioner of the Garda Síochána (police) proposed building the stadium in early 1935 and started fundraising with his wife Mary Agnes Murphy. Together they raised about 1/3 of the campaign. Built in 1939, the venue hosts over 55 days of boxing and a number of other events each year.

== Venue ==
The stadium was opened by government minister Frank Aiken in 1939. It is owned by the Irish Amateur Boxing Association (IABA) and has been used by them for over 60 years as the venue for their national and international contests.

=== Music ===
Historically, the stadium was used as a music venue, regularly hosting bands such as The Dubliners, Horslips, Genesis, Led Zeppelin, Thin Lizzy, U2, Van Morrison, The Smiths, and many others. On 26 February 1980, the band U2 performed a concert at the venue which was attended by executives of Island Records; at the end of the show, the label signed the band to their first recording contract.

=== Professional wrestling ===
Beginning in the 21st century, the venue has become a regular venue for professional wrestling events. Wrestling promotions such as Irish Whip Wrestling, Total Nonstop Action and Over the Top Wrestling have held events in the building.

=== Facilities ===
The venue is situated on the South Circular Road between Clanbrassil Street to the east and Dolphin's Barn to the west. The stadium stages amateur and professional boxing and professional wrestling bouts as well as providing facilities for concerts, conferences and corporate hospitality events.

=== Capacity ===
The capacity of the stadium is 2,080 for music events, which is reduced to 1,954 for boxing and wrestling events to accommodate the boxing or wrestling ring. The Ringside club seats up to 400 people for parties or seated dining, but some junior boxing events also take place here.

=== Refurbishment ===
In December 1999, the Minister for Arts, Sports and Tourism Jim McDaid, announced a £1.3m grant under the Sports Capital Programme to undertake the refurbishment of the stadium. The two-storey building was provided with a new grey-coloured limestone facade during the refurbishment.
