= Michele di Rocco =

Italian boxer

Personal information
- Nickname: The King
- Nationality: Italian
- Born: 4 May 1982 (age 44) Foligno, Umbria, Italy
- Height: 1.72 m (5 ft 8 in)
- Weight: Light-welterweight

Boxing career
- Stance: Orthodox

Boxing record
- Total fights: 45
- Wins: 41
- Win by KO: 18
- Losses: 3
- Draws: 1
Medal record
Men's amateur boxing
Representing Italy
Mediterranean Games
Bronze medal – third place	2001 Tunis	Lightweight
European Championships
Bronze medal – third place	2002 Perm	Lightweight

Michele di Rocco (born 4 May 1982) is an Italian professional boxer of Romani origin. He is a former European and European Union super-lightweight champion, and has challenged once for the WBA super-lightweight title. As an amateur he won a bronze medal at the 2002 European Championships and represented Italy at the 2004 Olympics, both in the lightweight division.

== Professional career ==
On 2 October 2004, di Rocco made his professional debut against Marian Bunea, stopping him in four rounds. He won his first regional championship—the European Union super-lightweight title—on 26 December 2006, defeating Giorgio Marinelli via unanimous decision (UD). One defence of the title was made a month later, on 30 January 2007, when di Rocco travelled to Finland and scored a UD over Juho Tolppola. On 21 September 2007, di Rocco lost his title to veteran and fellow Italian Giuseppe Lauri, who stopped him in seven rounds. In a rematch five years later, on 14 April 2012, di Rocco stopped Lauri in one round to regain his now-vacant title.

Di Rocco's career highlight came on 8 June 2013, when he defeated Lenny Daws via UD to win the vacant European super-lightweight title. However, the decision was highly disputed by Daws. Four successful defences were made of the title over the following two years. On 28 May 2016, di Rocco travelled to Scotland to face former two-weight world champion Ricky Burns, with the vacant WBA super-lightweight title on the line. In a very one-sided fight where di Rocco was knocked down twice, Burns won by stopping him in the eighth round.

== Professional boxing record ==
45 fights	41 wins	3 losses
By knockout	18	3
By decision	22	0
By disqualification	1	0
Draws	1	

No.	Result	Record	Opponent	Type	Round, time	Date	Location	Notes
45	Loss	41–3–1	Eduard Troyanovsky	TKO	4 (10), 2:18	1 Jul 2017	Luzhniki Palace of Sports, Moscow, Russia	
44	Win	41–2–1	Mikheil Avakyan	DQ	4 (6)	25 Mar 2017	Atlantico Live, Rome, Italy	Avakyan disqualified for repeated fouls
43	Loss	40–2–1	Ricky Burns	TKO	8 (12), 1:57	28 May 2016	The SSE Hydro, Glasgow, Scotland	For vacant WBA light-welterweight title
42	Win	40–1–1	Alexandre Lepelley	KO	8 (12)	30 May 2015	Teatro Principe, Milan, Italy	Retained European light-welterweight title
41	Win	39–1–1	Kasper Bruun	TKO	9 (12)	28 Feb 2015	Teatro Principe, Milan, Italy	Retained European light-welterweight title
40	Win	38–1–1	Ruben Nieto	UD	12	3 Oct 2014	Polideportivo Fernando Martín, Fuenlabrada, Spain	Retained European light-welterweight title
39	Win	37–1–1	Istvan Kiss	KO	3 (6)	17 May 2014	Pala di Fiore Ostia, Rome, Italy	
38	Win	36–1–1	Ville Piispanen	UD	12	21 Dec 2013	PalaBadminton, Milan, Italy	Retained European light-welterweight title
37	Win	35–1–1	Lenny Daws	UD	12	8 Jun 2013	Palazzetto dello sport Elio Pentassuglia, Brindisi, Italy	Won vacant European light-welterweight title
36	Win	34–1–1	Laszlo Robert Balogh	TKO	1 (6)	20 Oct 2012	Palazzetto dello sport Gianni D'Arco, Santa Teresa Gallura, Italy	
35	Win	33–1–1	Giuseppe Lauri	TKO	1 (12)	14 Apr 2012	PalaRewatt, Vicenza, Italy	Won vacant European Union light-welterweight title
34	Win	32–1–1	Laszlo Szekeres	PTS	6	27 Jan 2012	Palazzetto dello sport Mario D'Agata, Arezzo, Italy	
33	Win	31–1–1	Laszlo Robert Balogh	TKO	1 (6), 2:34	7 Oct 2011	Palazzetto dello sport, Monserrato, Italy	
32	Win	30–1–1	Robert Cristea	PTS	6	22 Jul 2011	Palazzetto dello sport, Cecina, Italy	
31	Win	29–1–1	Laszlo Komjathi	PTS	6	4 Dec 2010	Palazzetto dello sport, Decimomannu, Italy	
30	Win	28–1–1	Peter McDonagh	PTS	6	24 Jul 2010	Stadio Is Arenas, Quartu Sant'Elena, Italy	
29	Win	27–1–1	Arnold Turos	KO	2 (6), 2:56	12 Mar 2010	Palazzetto dello sport, Bertinoro, Italy	
28	Win	26–1–1	Carlos Winston Velasquez	PTS	6	25 Sep 2009	Geovillage Sport Wellness & Convention Resort, Olbia, Italy	
27	Win	25–1–1	Attila Molnar	KO	4 (6)	17 Jul 2009	Stadio Casaleno, Frosinone, Italy	
26	Win	24–1–1	Juan Martinez	PTS	8	26 Jun 2009	Piazza dei Rioni, Porto Santo Stefano, Italy	
25	Win	23–1–1	Hassan Saku	TKO	2 (6)	28 May 2009	Pala de Andrè, Ravenna, Italy	
24	Win	22–1–1	János Petrovics	PTS	6	20 Feb 2009	Palazzetto dello sport, Frosinone, Italy	
23	Win	21–1–1	János Petrovics	PTS	6	19 Dec 2008	Palazzetto dello sport di Via Austria, Grosseto, Italy	
22	Win	20–1–1	Rafael Chiruta	PTS	6	14 Nov 2008	Palazzetto dello sport, Carbonia, Italy	
21	Win	19–1–1	Ferenc Szabo	KO	4 (6)	12 Jul 2008	Sequals, Italy	
20	Win	18–1–1	Laszlo Szekeres	PTS	6	9 Jun 2008	Foligno, Italy	
19	Loss	17–1–1	Giuseppe Lauri	TKO	7 (12)	21 Sep 2007	PalaBastia, Livorno, Italy	Lost European Union light-welterweight title; For vacant WBC International light-welterweight title
18	Win	17–0–1	Zoltan Kalocsai	KO	2 (6), 2:36	25 May 2007	Pala de Andrè, Ravenna, Italy	
17	Win	16–0–1	Mircea Lurci	TKO	3 (6)	27 Apr 2007	PalaBotteghelle, Reggio Calabria, Italy	
16	Win	15–0–1	Juho Tolppola	UD	12	30 Jan 2007	Hartwall Arena, Helsinki, Finland	Retained European Union light-welterweight title
15	Win	14–0–1	Giorgio Marinelli	UD	12	26 Dec 2006	Grosseto, Italy	Won European Union light-welterweight title
14	Win	13–0–1	Anton Glofak	TKO	4 (6)	15 Jul 2006	Piazza Municipale, Sequals, Italy	
13	Win	12–0–1	Kalman Norbert Gagyi	PTS	6	23 Jun 2006	Bonassola, Italy	
12	Draw	11–0–1	Giorgio Marinelli	SD	10	9 Jun 2006	Stadio della Pallacorda, Rome, Italy	Retained Italy light-welterweight title; For European Union light-welterweight title
11	Win	11–0	Miro Dicky	PTS	6	26 May 2006	Palazzetto dello sport, Grosseto, Italy, Italy	
10	Win	10–0	Antonio Mastantuono	TKO	7 (10), 1:48	17 Mar 2006	Palazzetto dello sport, Grosseto, Italy, Italy	Retained Italy light-welterweight title
9	Win	9–0	Massimo Bertozzi	UD	10	21 Oct 2005	Centro Umbria Affari, Bastia Umbra, Italy	Won Italy light-welterweight title
8	Win	8–0	Elad Shmouel	UD	10	8 Aug 2005	Piazza della Pace, San Mango d'Aquino, Italy	Won vacant IBF Youth light-welterweight title
7	Win	7–0	Igor Krbusik	TKO	2 (6)	20 May 2005	Palazzetto dello sport, Grosseto, Italy	
6	Win	6–0	Csaba Toth	PTS	6	21 Mar 2005	San Mango d'Aquino, Italy	
5	Win	5–0	Roland Dekany	TKO	5 (6)	1 Mar 2005	Palazzetto dello sport, Grosseto, Italy	
4	Win	4–0	Jozef Kubovsky	PTS	6	18 Dec 2004	Marina, Grosseto, Italy	
3	Win	3–0	Nicolae Burloi	PTS	6	27 Nov 2004	Palazzetto dello sport Massimo Carrino, Genoa, Italy	
2	Win	2–0	Veselin Dimitrov Vasilev	TKO	3 (6), 2:22	15 Oct 2004	Palazzetto dello sport Lastra a Signa, Florence, Italy	
1	Win	1–0	Marian Bunea	TKO	4 (6), 1:56	2 Oct 2004	Palazzetto dello sport, Grosseto, Italy	

Sporting positions
Regional boxing titles
Vacant Title last held by Krzysztof Bienias	IBF Youth light-welterweight champion 5 August 2005 – June 2006; Vacated	Vacant Title next held by Decha Kokietgym
Preceded by Massimo Bertozzi	Italy light-welterweight champion 21 October 2005 – December 2006; Vacated	Vacant Title next held by Brunet Zamora
Preceded by Giorgio Marinelli	European Union light-welterweight champion 26 December 2006 – 21 September 2007	Succeeded by Giuseppe Lauri
Vacant Title last held by Vittorio Oi	European Union light-welterweight champion 14 April 2012 – October 2012; Vacated	Vacant Title next held by Lenny Daws
Vacant Title last held by Denis Shafikov	European light-welterweight champion 8 June 2013 – December 2015; Vacated	Vacant Title next held by Ruben Nieto
