= Giuseppe Lauri =

Italian boxer

Personal information
- Nickname: The End
- Nationality: Italian
- Born: 28 May 1976 (age 50) Tradate, Varese, Lombardy, Italy
- Height: 1.70 m (5 ft 7 in)
- Weight: Light-welterweight; Welterweight; Light-middleweight; Middleweight

Boxing career
- Reach: 170 cm (67 in)
- Stance: Orthodox

Boxing record
- Total fights: 77
- Wins: 56
- Win by KO: 34
- Losses: 21

Giuseppe Lauri (born 28 May 1976) is an Italian professional boxer. A veteran of the sport for more than two decades, he held the European Union super-lightweight title from 2007 to 2010, and has challenged four times for the European super-lightweight title.

== Professional career ==
Lauri made his professional debut on 20 December 1997, scoring a first-round stoppage over Frederic Rafhey, who also debuted. Fighting mainly in Switzerland and Italy throughout the next decade, Lauri also travelled to the UK in losing efforts against future world champions Ricky Hatton and Junior Witter. On 22 September 2006, Lauri fought for his first major regional championship—the vacant European super-lightweight title—but lost a unanimous decision to Ted Bami. In a rematch with Bami on 30 March 2007, with the same title on the line, Lauri lost again via unanimous decision.

Lauri became the European Union super-lightweight champion on 21 September 2007, stopping Michele di Rocco in seven rounds. They, too, would have a rematch many years later on 14 April 2012. In this fight, which had the now-vacant European Union super-lightweight title on the line, di Rocco stopped Lauri in the first round. During his reign as European Union champion, Lauri would score wins over contenders Peter McDonagh, Ville Piispanen and Juho Tolppola. The fight against Tolppola, on 30 May 2009, ended in a highly controversial manner when Tolppola was first disqualified after ten rounds due to repeated fouls, after which his father stormed the ring and punched the referee.

Further unsuccessful challenges for the European super-lightweight title came against Paul McCloskey on 11 June 2010 and Denis Shafikov on 23 September 2011, both via stoppage. Beginning from the rematch with di Rocco, Lauri would suffer a seven-fight losing streak, which was finally ended on 24 May 2014, with a second-round stoppage win over Lajos Bimbo.

== Professional boxing record ==
76 fights	55 wins	21 losses
By knockout	33	9
By decision	20	12
By disqualification	2	0

No.	Result	Record	Opponent	Type	Round, time	Date	Location	Notes
77	Loss	56–21	Zdravko Popov	UD	6	27 Oct 2018	Arena Armeec, Sofia, Bulgaria	
76	Loss	56–20	Mohammed Rabii	TKO	3 (8), 1:45	24 Mar 2018	Palais des Sports, Marseille, France	
75	Win	56–19	Denny Lehmann	TKO	6 (10), 1:25	4 Mar 2017	Müggelspreehalle, Grünheide, Germany	Won vacant GBC Intercontinental middleweight title
74	Loss	55–19	Sasha Yengoyan	UD	8	14 Oct 2016	Flanders Sports Arena, Ghent, Belgium	
73	Loss	55–18	Sebastien Bouchard	TKO	2 (6), 0:39	28 Nov 2015	Videotron Centre, Quebec City, Quebec, Canada	
72	Loss	55–17	Predrag Radosevic	UD	12	17 May 2015	Morača Sports Center, Podgorica, Montenegro	For vacant WBO European light-middleweight title
71	Win	55–16	Rico Schultz	KO	7 (12), 2:59	3 Oct 2014	Müggelspreehalle, Grünheide, Germany	Won GBC light-middleweight title
70	Win	54–16	Lajos Bimbo	TKO	2 (6)	24 May 2014	Sándor Petőfi Grade School, Kiskunfélegyháza, Hungary	
69	Loss	53–16	Steve Claggett	UD	8	9 Nov 2013	Cowboys Casino, Calgary, Alberta, Canada	
68	Loss	53–15	Kevin Bizier	UD	6	28 Sep 2013	Bell Centre, Montreal, Quebec, Canada	
67	Loss	53–14	Mian Hussain	UD	6	6 Sep 2013	Casino du Lac-Leamy, Gatineau, Quebec, Canada	
66	Loss	53–13	Samuel Vargas	UD	8	21 Jun 2013	Chapiteau CCSE Maisonneuve, Montreal, Quebec, Canada	
65	Loss	53–12	Selçuk Aydın	UD	10	22 Mar 2013	Universal Hall, Berlin, Germany	For vacant PABA interim light-welterweight title
64	Loss	53–11	Ahmad Cheikho	UD	8	16 Feb 2013	Casino du Lac-Leamy, Gatineau, Quebec, Canada	
63	Loss	53–10	Michele di Rocco	TKO	1 (12)	14 Apr 2012	PalaSport, Vicenza, Italy	For vacant European Union light-welterweight title
62	Win	53–9	Zsolt Hamza	PTS	4	14 Jan 2012	Lauri Gym, Békéscsaba, Hungary	
61	Loss	52–9	Levan Ghvamichava	TKO	2 (8), 2:40	28 Oct 2011	Sports Centre, Wishaw, Scotland	
60	Loss	52–8	Denis Shafikov	RTD	8 (12), 3:00	23 Sep 2011	Ice Hall, Helsinki, Finland	For vacant European light-welterweight title
59	Win	52–7	Laszlo Komjathi	PTS	6	8 Jul 2011	Castello Maniace, Syracuse, Italy	
58	Win	51–7	Gabor Nagy	TKO	1 (4)	18 Feb 2011	AREV Sporthall, Székesfehérvár, Hungary	
57	Loss	50–7	Paul McCloskey	KO	11 (12), 0:45	11 Jun 2010	King's Hall, Belfast, Northern Ireland	For European light-welterweight title
56	Win	50–6	Ferenc Szabo	KO	1 (6)	23 Apr 2010	Palazzetto dello Sport, Malnate, Italy	
55	Win	49–6	János Petrovics	PTS	6	18 Dec 2009	York Hall, London, England	
54	Win	48–6	Juho Tolppola	DQ	10 (12), 2:10	30 May 2009	Hartwall Arena, Helsinki, Finland	Retained European Union light-welterweight title; Tolppola disqualified for repeated fouls
53	Win	47–6	Ville Piispanen	TKO	6 (12)	19 Dec 2008	PalaLido, Milan, Italy	Retained European Union light-welterweight title
52	Win	46–6	Rastislav Kovac	TKO	4 (6)	16 May 2008	PalaRuffini, Turin, Italy	
51	Win	45–6	Peter McDonagh	TKO	6 (12), 2:12	29 Feb 2008	PalaLido, Milan, Italy	Retained European Union light-welterweight title
50	Win	44–6	Laszlo Komjathi	PTS	6	16 Nov 2007	Palazzetto dello Sport, Pisa, Italy	
49	Win	43–6	Michele di Rocco	TKO	7 (12)	21 Sep 2007	PalaBastia, Livorno, Italy	Won European Union and vacant WBC International light-welterweight titles
48	Loss	42–6	Ted Bami	UD	12	30 Mar 2007	K2 Leisure Centre, Crawley, England	For European light-welterweight title
47	Win	42–5	Miro Dicky	UD	6	9 Jan 2007	Palazzetto dello Sport, Bergamo, Italy	
46	Loss	41–5	Ted Bami	UD	12	22 Sep 2006	York Hall, London, England	For vacant European light-welterweight title
45	Win	41–4	Wladimir Borov	PTS	6	27 Jul 2006	Velodromo Vigorelli, Milan, Italy	
44	Win	40–4	Brahim Bariz	PTS	8	11 Oct 2005	Palasport Sergio Rizzi, Lavena Ponte Tresa, Italy	
43	Win	39–4	Laszlo Komjathi	TKO	10 (12)	25 Jun 2005	Pista La Resega, Lugano, Switzerland	Retained IBF Inter-Continental light-welterweight title
42	Win	38–4	Laszlo Komjathi	TKO	3 (12)	19 Feb 2005	Palamonti Clivio, Italy	Retained IBF Inter-Continental light-welterweight title
41	Win	37–4	Joseph Sarkodie	TKO	3 (6)	8 Dec 2004	Venegono Superiore, Italy	
40	Win	36–4	Farid El Houari	TKO	9 (12)	2 Jul 2004	Caivano, Italy	Won vacant IBF Inter-Continental light-welterweight title
39	Win	35–4	Massimo Bertozzi	TKO	9 (10)	14 May 2004	Latina, Italy	Won vacant Italy light-welterweight title
38	Win	34–4	Hoang Sang Nguyen	PTS	6	17 Apr 2004	Cocquio-Trevisago, Italy	
37	Win	33–4	Antonio Postigo	PTS	6	23 Dec 2003	Varese, Italy	
36	Win	32–4	Ruben Silva Diaz	TKO	3 (10)	12 Dec 2003	Campobello di Mazara, Italy	
35	Win	31–4	Vasile Surcica	PTS	6	26 Sep 2003	Frosinone, Italy	
34	Loss	30–4	Levan Kirakosyan	TKO	3 (6)	5 Apr 2003	Varese, Italy	
33	Win	30–3	Alan Sebire	TKO	2 (6), 1:45	7 Mar 2003	Varese, Italy	
32	Loss	29–3	Junior Witter	TKO	2 (12), 1:21	23 Nov 2002	Storm Arena, Derby, England	
31	Win	29–2	Vasile Herteg	TKO	8 (12)	14 Jun 2002	Varese, Italy	Won vacant WBO Inter-Continental light-welterweight title
30	Win	28–2	Michel Raynaud	PTS	6	10 May 2002	Sacile, Italy	
29	Win	27–2	Karim Chelloul	TKO	4 (6)	8 Mar 2002	Bergamo, Italy	
28	Win	27–2	Massimo Bertozzi	PTS	10	23 Dec 2001	Venegono, Italy	Retained Italy light-welterweight title
27	Win	25–2	Franco Palmiero	TKO	8 (10)	14 Sep 2001	Patti, Italy	Won vacant Italy light-welterweight title
26	Win	24–2	Alvaro Moreno Gamboa	DQ	3 (8)	17 Aug 2001	Toscolano-Maderno, Italy	
25	Win	23–2	Ahmed Merichiche	TKO	3 (6)	20 Apr 2001	Vigevano, Italy	
24	Win	22–2	Julio Cesar Meran	UD	6	2 Mar 2001	Bizzozero, Italy	
23	Win	21–2	Joel Toinette	PTS	6	23 Dec 2000	Venegono Superiore, Italy	
22	Win	20–2	Frédéric Tripp	PTS	6	8 Dec 2000	San Donà di Piave, Italy	
21	Loss	19–2	Ricky Hatton	TKO	5 (12), 1:57	23 Sep 2000	York Hall, London, England	Lost WBA Inter-Continental light-welterweight title; For WBO Inter-Continental light-welterweight title
20	Win	19–1	Francesco Cioffi	PTS	6	28 Jul 2000	Rovigo, Italy	
19	Win	18–1	Giani Gogol	KO	1 (6)	5 Jul 2000	Varese, Italy	
18	Win	17–1	Aziz Makloufi	PTS	8	31 Mar 2000	St. Gallen, Switzerland	
17	Win	16–1	Sammy Sparkman	TKO	3 (12)	17 Mar 2000	Mendrisio, Switzerland	Won vacant WBA Inter-Continental light-welterweight title
16	Win	15–1	Jozef Kubovsky	TKO	5 (6)	12 Feb 2000	Ascona, Switzerland	
15	Win	14–1	Andriy Syniepupov	PTS	10	26 Nov 1999	Ascona, Switzerland	Won WBF (Foundation) Intercontinental welterweight title
14	Loss	13–1	Allan Vester	SD	12	1 Oct 1999	Mendrisio, Switzerland	For IBF Inter-Continental light-welterweight title
13	Win	13–0	Ruslan Konstandi	UD	8	24 Jul 1999	Ascona, Switzerland	
12	Win	12–0	Joao Andrade Queijas	KO	2 (6)	5 Jun 1999	Mendrisio, Switzerland	
11	Win	11–0	Viktor Plotnykov	TKO	5 (6)	21 May 1999	Circus, Kyiv, Ukraine	
10	Win	10–0	Ferenc Szakállas	KO	1 (6)	24 Apr 1999	Ascona, Switzerland	
9	Win	9–0	Jean-Paul Moulun	TKO	1	20 Feb 1999	Mendrisio, Switzerland	
8	Win	8–0	Vyacheslav Barinov	TKO	6 (8)	27 Dec 1998	Ascona, Switzerland	
7	Win	7–0	Hamit Riahi	TKO	5 (6)	14 Nov 1998	Mendrisio, Switzerland	
6	Win	6–0	Rimvydas Bilius	TKO	5 (6)	17 Oct 1998	Lugano, Switzerland	
5	Win	5–0	Radoslav Gaidev	TKO	4 (6)	27 Sep 1998	Kloten, Switzerland	
4	Win	4–0	Demir Nanev	TKO	1 (4)	25 Jul 1998	Mendrisio, Switzerland	
3	Win	3–0	Asen Vasilev	PTS	6	25 Apr 1998	Mendrisio, Switzerland	
2	Win	2–0	Ahmed Lain	TKO	4 (6)	14 Mar 1998	Mendrisio, Switzerland	
1	Win	1–0	Frederic Rafhey	TKO	1 (6)	20 Dec 1997	Bellinzona, Switzerland	

Sporting positions
Regional boxing titles
Preceded by Michele di Rocco	European Union super-lightweight champion 21 September 2007 – June 2010; Vacated	Vacant Title next held by Ville Piispanen
