= Gianluca Branco =

Italian boxer

Personal information
- Nationality: Italian
- Born: 20 September 1970 (age 56) Civitavecchia, Lazio, Italy
- Height: 1.68 m (5 ft 6 in)
- Weight: Light-welterweight; Welterweight

Boxing career
- Stance: Orthodox

Boxing record
- Total fights: 53
- Wins: 49
- Win by KO: 24
- Losses: 3
- Draws: 1

Gianluca Branco (born 20 September 1970) is an Italian former professional boxer who competed from 1995 to 2014. He held the European super-lightweight title twice between 2001 and 2009, the European Union welterweight title from 2012 to 2013, the European welterweight title from 2014 to 2016, and challenged twice for a world title in 2004 and 2006. Gianluca is the younger brother of former boxer Silvio Branco.

== Professional career ==
Branco made his professional debut on 7 April 1995, knocking out Aladar Horvath in six rounds. Fighting almost exclusively in his native Italy, he would spend the next nine years undefeated, save for a points draw against Viktor Baranov on 19 October 1998. Branco won his first major regional championship—the vacant European light-welterweight title—on 23 June 2001, with a majority decision victory over Gabriel Mapouka. Two successful defences of the title were made, against George Scott on 17 November 2001 (sixth-round technical decision) and Allan Vester on 9 March 2002 (tenth-round stoppage).

On 24 January 2004, Branco fought for his first world championship—the vacant WBC light-welterweight title—against veteran Arturo Gatti. This was also Branco's first visit to the United States, where Gatti was an established star. Branco started off well, counterpunching the combinations of Gatti, until the latter injured his hand severely by landing a punch on Branco's hip in round five. Gatti then had to rely entirely on his jab to stay out of trouble for the remainder of the fight. By the tenth round, with the fight still close, Gatti turned the tide decisively in his favour when he scored a knockdown against Branco. By the end of twelve rounds, Gatti won a clear unanimous decision (UD) to hand Branco his first loss.

Branco would receive a second opportunity at a world title on 4 March 2006, this time against WBO light-welterweight champion Miguel Cotto. From the opening round, Branco had no answer for the undefeated superstar, who stopped him in eight rounds. On 16 May 2008, Branco won his second European light-welterweight title. Despite suffering a knockdown in the second round, he went on to claim a split decision over the defending champion Lynes. Branco made one defence, on 19 December 2008, stopping Juho Tolppola in nine hard-fought rounds.

Having moved up in weight, Branco made his first of two attempts at winning the European welterweight title, on 26 March 2010, but lost a UD to Matthew Hatton. On 10 November 2012, Branco won the vacant European Union welterweight title with a UD over Krzysztof Bienias. Once defence was made, on 22 February 2013, in a UD victory against Lukasz Maciec. On 22 November 2014, Branco succeeded in his second attempt at winning the now-vacant European welterweight title, by forcing Rafał Jackiewicz to retire in his corner after six rounds.

== Professional boxing record ==
53 fights	49 wins	3 losses
By knockout	24	1
By decision	25	2
Draws	1	

No.	Result	Record	Opponent	Type	Round, time	Date	Location	Notes
53	Win	49–3–1	Rafał Jackiewicz	RTD	6 (12), 3:00	22 Nov 2014	Palazzetto dello Sport, Terracina, Italy	Won vacant European welterweight title
52	Win	48–3–1	Konstantins Sakara	UD	6	21 Dec 2013	PalaBadminton, Milan, Italy	
51	Win	47–3–1	Łukasz Maciec	UD	12	22 Feb 2013	Palazzetto dello Sport, Montalto di Castro, Italy	Retained European Union welterweight title
50	Win	46–3–1	Krzysztof Bienias	UD	12	10 Nov 2012	Palazzetto dello Sport, Civitavecchia, Italy	Won vacant European Union welterweight title
49	Win	45–3–1	János Petrovics	TKO	6 (6), 0:28	11 Nov 2011	Palazzetto dello Sport, Pontedera, Italy	
48	Win	44–3–1	Semjons Moroseks	PTS	6	27 Nov 2010	Palazzetto dello Sport, Civitavecchia, Italy	
47	Loss	43–3–1	Matthew Hatton	UD	12	26 Mar 2010	Goresbrook Leisure Centre, London, England	For vacant European welterweight title
46	Win	43–2–1	János Petrovics	PTS	6	11 Jul 2009	BJK Akatlar Arena, Istanbul, Turkey	
45	Win	42–2–1	Juho Tolppola	TKO	9 (12)	19 Dec 2008	PalaLido, Milan, Italy	Retained European light-welterweight title
44	Win	41–2–1	Colin Lynes	SD	12	16 May 2008	PalaRuffini, Turin, Italy	Won European light-welterweight title
43	Win	40–2–1	Nico Salzmann	PTS	8	29 Feb 2008	PalaLido, Milan, Italy	
42	Win	39–2–1	Laszlo Komjathi	TKO	4 (6)	8 Dec 2007	La Palestre, Le Cannet, France	
41	Win	38–2–1	Arek Malek	PTS	6	31 Jul 2007	Centro Polifunzionale, San Genesio ed Uniti, Italy	
40	Win	37–2–1	Adam Zadworny	TKO	1 (6)	8 Oct 2006	PalaLido, Milan, Italy	
39	Loss	36–2–1	Miguel Cotto	TKO	8 (12), 0:49	4 Mar 2006	Coliseo Rubén Rodríguez, Bayamón, Puerto Rico	For WBO light-welterweight title
38	Win	36–1–1	Farid El Houari	TKO	4 (8)	22 Jul 2005	Campione d'Italia, Italy	
37	Win	35–1–1	Ariel Francisco Burgos	TKO	6 (8), 2:35	12 Mar 2005	Mazda Palace, Milan, Italy	
36	Win	34–1–1	Vasile Herteg	TKO	2 (6)	24 Jul 2004	Civitavecchia, Italy	
35	Win	33–1–1	Nasser Lakrib	TKO	4 (10)	8 May 2004	Civitavecchia, Italy	
34	Loss	32–1–1	Arturo Gatti	UD	12	24 Jan 2004	Boardwalk Hall, Atlantic City, New Jersey, US	For vacant WBC light-welterweight title
33	Win	32–0–1	Michel Raynaud	PTS	6	5 Nov 2002	Villa Erba, Cernobbio, Italy	
32	Win	31–0–1	Massimo Bertozzi	PTS	6	13 Sep 2002	Hotel Marina Piccola, Puglia, Italy	
31	Win	30–0–1	Allan Vester	TKO	10 (12)	9 Mar 2002	Montecatini Terme, Italy	Retained European light-welterweight title
30	Win	29–0–1	George Scott	TD	6 (12)	17 Nov 2001	Civitavecchia, Italy	Retained European light-welterweight title; TD after Scott was cut from an accidental head clash
29	Win	28–0–1	Gabriel Mapouka	MD	12	23 Jun 2001	Massy, France	Won vacant European light-welterweight title
28	Win	27–0–1	Frederic Tripp	PTS	6	17 Feb 2001	Padua, Italy	
27	Win	26–0–1	Adejoussi Adewale	UD	6	22 Dec 2000	Monfalcone, Italy	
26	Win	25–0–1	Slobodan Vlaovic	PTS	6	17 Jun 2000	Bovezzo, Italy	
25	Win	24–0–1	Slobodan Vlaovic	UD	6	18 Mar 2000	Ferrara, Italy	
24	Win	23–0–1	Francesco Cioffi	PTS	6	3 Dec 1999	Milan, Italy	
23	Win	22–0–1	Gheorghe Paraschiv	TKO	2	16 Oct 1999	Bondeno, Italy	
22	Win	21–0–1	Horia Dobre	TKO	1 (6)	7 Aug 1999	Civitavecchia, Italy	
21	Win	20–0–1	Francesco Cioffi	UD	6	24 Apr 1999	Ferrara, Italy	
20	Win	19–0–1	Nassim Yahiaoui	PTS	6	18 Dec 1998	Brindisi, Italy	
19	Draw	18–0–1	Viktor Baranov	PTS	8	19 Oct 1998	Bari, Italy	
18	Win	18–0	Andile Nongaza	TKO	4 (6)	28 Jul 1998	Civitavecchia, Italy	
17	Win	17–0	Massimo Bertozzi	PTS	10	9 May 1998	Aulla, Italy	Retained Italy light-welterweight title
16	Win	16–0	Elyes Mahdjoub	UD	8	26 Feb 1998	Civitavecchia, Italy	
15	Win	15–0	Elyes Mahdjoub	PTS	6	29 Nov 1997	Novara, Italy	
14	Win	14–0	Antonio Strabello	KO	6 (10)	28 Aug 1997	Forte Michelangelo, Civitavecchia, Italy	Retained Italy light-welterweight title
13	Win	13–0	Francesco Cioffi	PTS	10	30 May 1997	Castellammare di Stabia, Italy	Won vacant Italy light-welterweight title
12	Win	12–0	Lajos Nagy	TKO	4 (12)	13 Feb 1997	Palazzetto dello Sport, Civitavecchia, Italy	Won vacant WBU Intercontinental light-welterweight title
11	Win	11–0	Abderzek Oulad Laarbi	TKO	1 (6)	28 Dec 1996	Castel Mella, Italy	
10	Win	10–0	Angel Fernandez	TKO	1 (6)	12 Dec 1996	Palazzetto dello Sport, Civitavecchia, Italy	
9	Win	9–0	Janos Zsiros	TKO	1 (6)	8 Aug 1996	Town Square, San Mango d'Aquino, Italy	
8	Win	8–0	Rene Orlovsky	TKO	4 (6)	2 May 1996	Palazzetto dello Sport, Civitavecchia, Italy	
7	Win	7–0	Rene Orlovsky	TKO	4 (6)	20 Jan 1996	Palasport, Marsala, Italy	
6	Win	6–0	Hamit Riahi	PTS	6	4 Jan 1996	Civitavecchia, Italy	
5	Win	5–0	Fabio Marinoni	PTS	6	27 Sep 1995	Petrosino, Italy	
4	Win	4–0	Mario Spadaro	TKO	5 (6)	5 Aug 1995	Tatti, Italy	
3	Win	3–0	Maurizio Bonito	KO	4 (6)	26 Jun 1995	Cinigiano, Italy	
2	Win	2–0	Mauro Barigelli	KO	3 (6)	3 Jun 1995	Civitavecchia, Italy	
1	Win	1–0	Aladar Horvath	KO	6 (6)	7 Apr 1995	Rome, Italy	

Sporting positions
Regional boxing titles
Vacant Title last held by Michele Piccirillo	Italy light-welterweight champion 30 May 1997 – September 1999; Vacated	Vacant Title next held by Christian Giantomassi
Vacant Title last held by Oktay Urkal	European light-welterweight champion 23 June 2001 – September 2002; Vacated	Vacant Title next held by Oktay Urkal
Preceded by Colin Lynes	European light-welterweight champion 16 May 2008 – July 2009; Vacated	Vacant Title next held by Souleymane M'baye
Vacant Title last held by Rafał Jackiewicz	European Union welterweight champion 10 November 2012 – October 2013; Vacated	Vacant Title next held by Ceferino Rodriguez
Vacant Title last held by Leonard Bundu	European welterweight champion 22 November 2014 – April 2016; Vacated	Vacant Title next held by Leonard Bundu
