= Suro Ismailov =

Swedish boxer

Personal information
- Born: 17 February 1991 (age 35) Krasnodar, Russia
- Weight: Light welterweight (64 kg)

Boxing career

Suro Ismailov (born 17 February 1991, Krasnodar) is a boxer based in Norrköping, Sweden. He made his debut in 2007.

Representing NBK Akilles, he was the 2008 Swedish junior champion in 57 kg. At the age of 17, he won silver at the senior Swedish championships in 2008, and has competed in the Swedish national team in both junior and senior classes. Ismailov won silver in the 64 kg class at the Nordic Championships in 2009 after losing the final to Aleksander Jakobsen.

In 2014, Ismailov boxed Abdu Tebazalwa in the first professional boxing Swedish championship match in 64 years. Ismailov won the title at the event in Malmö.

== Professional boxing record ==
7 fights	6 wins	1 loss
By decision	6	1

No.	Result	Record	Opponent	Type	Round, time	Date	Location	Notes
7	Win	6–1	Abdul Tebazalwa	UD	6	22 Nov 2014	Amiralen, Malmö, Sweden	Won vacant Swedish lightweight title
6	Loss	5–1	Juho Tolppola	UD	6	9 May 2014	Urheilutalo, Helsinki, Finland	
5	Win	5–0	Arek Malek	UD	4	8 Nov 2013	Kalmar Sporhall, Kalmar, Sweden	
4	Win	4–0	Aleksandar Nikoloski	UD	4	16 Mar 2013	Bilbörsen, Kristianstad, Sweden	
3	Win	3–0	Vatche Wartanian	MD	4	16 Nov 2012	Cloetta Center, Linköpig, Sweden	
2	Win	2–0	Sergejs Kirillovs	UD	4	1 Sep 2012	Surbrunnsparken, Ystad, Sweden	
1	Win	1–0	Sanharib Staifou	UD	4	27 Apr 2012	Cloetta Center, Linköping, Sweden	
