= Vyacheslav Uzelkov =

Ukrainian boxer (1979–2024)

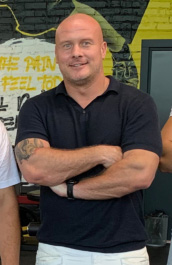

Personal information
- Native name: В'ячеслав Узелков
- Nickname: Steel Power
- Nationality: Ukrainian
- Born: Vyacheslav Valentinovich Uzelkov; 8 April 1979 Vinnytsia, Ukrainian SSR, USSR
- Died: 9 November 2024 (aged 45)

Boxing career
Medal record
Men's amateur boxing
Representing Ukraine
World Championships
Bronze medal – third place	2001 Belfast	Heavyweight
European Championships
Silver medal – second place	2002 Perm	Heavyweight

Vyacheslav Valentynovych Uzelkov (Ukrainian: В'ячеслав Валентинович Узелков; 8 April 1979 – 9 November 2024), nicknamed "Steel Power", was a Ukrainian boxer. He competed at the 2001 World Amateur Boxing Championships, winning the bronze medal in the heavyweight event. He also competed at the 2002 European Amateur Boxing Championships, winning the silver medal in the same event.

Uzelkov died on 9 November 2024, at the age of 45, after suffering from multiple health problems.
