= Denis Shafikov =

Russian boxer (born 1985)

Denis Shafikov Денис Шафиков
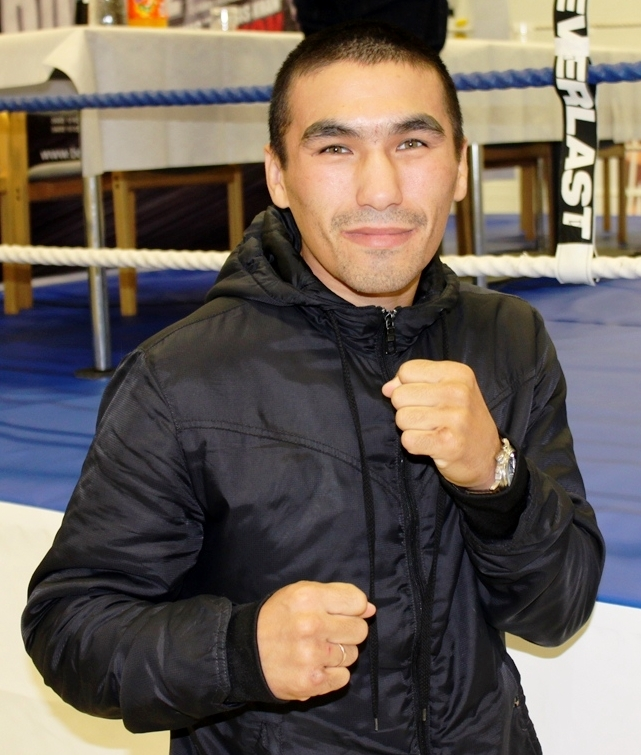
- Shafikov in 2011

Personal information
- Nickname: Genghis Khan
- Nationality: Russian
- Born: Denis Fuatovich Shafikov; 3 June 1985 (age 41) Miass, Chelyabinsk, Russian SFSR, Soviet Union
- Height: 1.65 m (5 ft 5 in)
- Weight: Super-featherweight; Lightweight; Light-welterweight

Boxing career
- Reach: 174 cm (69 in)
- Stance: Southpaw

Boxing record
- Total fights: 46
- Wins: 40
- Win by KO: 20
- Losses: 4
- Draws: 2

Denis Fuatovich Shafikov (Bashkir: Денис Фуат улы Шафиҡов, romanized: Denis Fuat ulı Şafiqov, Russian: Шафиков Денис Фуатович; born 3 June 1985) is a Russian professional boxer. He held the European super-lightweight title from 2011 to 2013, and has challenged three times for the IBF lightweight title. In November 2017, Shafikov was ranked within the world's top ten active lightweights by The Ring magazine, the Transnational Boxing Rankings Board, and BoxRec.

== Early life and amateur career ==
Born into a Bashkir family, Shafikov did not immediately take a liking to boxing when trying out different sports in childhood. He nonetheless began his amateur boxing career at 13 years old, in which he had "about 90 amateur fights and lost only 6 of them." His decision to turn professional was based on wanting to earn money for his family, rather than medals.

== Professional career ==
Shafikov has been trained by Abel Sanchez since 2015. He made his professional debut on 30 November 2003, winning a four-round unanimous decision over Pavel Lyakhov, who also debuted. For the next eleven years, Shafikov would remain undefeated while fighting mainly in Finland, having moved there in 2007. On 29 October 2010, he fought to a majority draw against Brunet Zamora, with the regional WBA Inter-Continental light-welterweight title on the line. A year later, on 23 September 2011, Shafikov won his first major regional championship—the European light-welterweight title—by forcing veteran contender Giuseppe Lauri to retire in his corner. Two successful defences of the title were made in 2012: the first was against Lee McAllister on 25 February, which ended in an eighth-round corner retirement. The second was a rematch with Zamora on 31 May, which Shafikov won via unanimous decision.

=== Shafikov vs. Vasquez ===
On 22 February 2014, Shafikov travelled to Macau to face IBF lightweight champion Miguel Vázquez. In what was described as a "lightweight title fight that completely sucked the air out of [the] venue" due to "clinching, headbutts and lots of other matters that don't quite reflect actual fighting", Vázquez went on to hand Shafikov his first professional loss in a lacklustre unanimous decision.

=== Shafikov vs. Barthelemy ===
The following year, on 18 December, Shafikov received another opportunity to fight for the vacant IBF lightweight title, this time against Rances Barthelemy, but lost again via unanimous decision.

=== Shafikov vs. Herring ===
Shafikov returned on 2 July 2016 in emphatic style, beating down and stopping undefeated lightweight prospect Jamel Herring in the tenth and final round.

=== Shafikov vs. Easter Jr ===
On 30 June 2017, in his third world title challenge, Shafikov lost a competitive unanimous decision against IBF lightweight champion Robert Easter Jr., in a hard-hitting slugfest. The scorecards read 120-108, 120-108 and 116-112 in favour of Easter Jr.

=== Shafikov vs. Alvarado ===
In his next bout, Shafikov faced Rene Alvarado, who was ranked #10 by the WBA at super featherweight. Shafikov lost the fight via split decision.

== Personal life ==
Despite his nickname of "Genghis Khan", Shafikov is of Bashkir rather than Mongol ethnicity. The nickname was given to him by his Finnish promoter Pekka Mäki, with Shafikov saying that he wants to "conquer the world as Genghis Khan did." His favourite boxers include Mike Tyson and Manny Pacquiao.

== Professional boxing record ==
46 fights	40 wins	4 losses
By knockout	20	0
By decision	19	4
By disqualification	1	0
Draws	2	

No.	Result	Record	Opponent	Type	Round, time	Date	Location	Notes
46	Draw	40–4–2	Gaybatulla Gadzhialiev	MD	10	9 Feb 2019	Galaktika Culture Centre, Estosadok, Russia	
45	Win	40–4–1	Jhon Gemino	UD	10	21 Jul 2018	Olympic Stadium, Moscow, Russia	
44	Win	39–4–1	Hector Ruben Ambriz Suarez	UD	8	6 Jun 2018	Avalon Hollywood, Los Angeles, California, US	
43	Loss	38–4–1	René Alvarado	SD	10	9 Dec 2017	Mandalay Bay Events Center, Paradise, Nevada, US	
42	Loss	38–3–1	Robert Easter Jr.	UD	12	30 Jun 2017	Huntington Center, Toledo, Ohio, US	For IBF lightweight title
41	Win	38–2–1	Richard Commey	SD	12	7 Dec 2016	Tough Fight Gym, Moscow, Russia	
40	Win	37–2–1	Jamel Herring	TKO	10 (10), 0:36	2 Jul 2016	Santander Arena, Reading, Pennsylvania, US	
39	Loss	36–2–1	Rances Barthelemy	UD	12	18 Dec 2015	Pearl Concert Theater, Paradise, Nevada, US	For vacant IBF lightweight title
38	Win	36–1–1	Roy Mukhlis	TKO	3 (10), 1:14	17 Jul 2015	Cotai Arena, Macau, SAR	
37	Win	35–1–1	Miguel Angel Mendoza	UD	8	13 Dec 2014	Cosmopolitan of Las Vegas, Paradise, Nevada, US	
36	Win	34–1–1	Rustam Nugaev	TKO	9 (12), 1:16	15 Aug 2014	Chumash Casino Resort, Santa Ynez, California, US	
35	Loss	33–1–1	Miguel Vázquez	UD	12	22 Feb 2014	Cotai Arena, Macau, SAR	For IBF lightweight title
34	Win	33–0–1	Santos Benavides	TKO	7 (10), 0:10	17 Aug 2013	Energy Arena, Laredo, Texas, US	
33	Win	32–0–1	Alisher Rahimov	DQ	11 (12), 2:24	16 Mar 2013	Sports Palace "Znamya", Noginsk, Russia	Won WBC Baltic and vacant WBC–CISBB lightweight titles; Rahimov disqualified for repeated low blows
32	Win	31–0–1	Albert Mensah	UD	12	1 Dec 2012	Parque Andres Quintana Roo, Cozumel, Mexico	Won IBF International and vacant WBC Baltic light-welterweight titles
31	Win	30–0–1	James Onyango	UD	8	18 Sep 2012	Varshavka Sky, Moscow, Russia	
30	Win	29–0–1	Brunet Zamora	UD	12	31 May 2012	Ufa Arena, Ufa, Russia	Retained European light-welterweight title
29	Win	28–0–1	Lee McAllister	RTD	8 (12), 0:01	25 Feb 2012	AECC, Aberdeen, Scotland	Retained European light-welterweight title
28	Win	27–0–1	Giuseppe Lauri	RTD	8 (12), 3:00	23 Sep 2011	Ice Hall, Helsinki, Finland	Won vacant European light-welterweight title
27	Win	26–0–1	Nugzar Margvelashvili	TKO	5 (8), 1:53	4 Mar 2011	Hartwall Arena, Helsinki, Finland	
26	Draw	25–0–1	Brunet Zamora	MD	12	29 Oct 2010	Yubileyny Sports Palace, Saint Petersburg, Russia	For WBA Inter-Continental light-welterweight title
25	Win	25–0	Peter Semo	UD	8	4 Sep 2010	Töölö Sports Hall, Helsinki, Finland	
24	Win	24–0	Leonardo Resendiz	RTD	6 (8), 3:00	22 Jul 2010	Restaurant Orizzonte, Jūrmala, Latvia	
23	Win	23–0	Bobir Normatov	KO	1 (8), 1:05	30 Jun 2010	Club "East-West", Saint Petersburg, Russia	
22	Win	22–0	Fernando Trejo	UD	12	24 Oct 2009	Urheilutalo, Helsinki, Finland	Won vacant IBO Inter-Continental light-welterweight title
21	Win	21–0	Aliaksei Volchan	TKO	2 (10), 1:26	25 Sep 2009	Atmosphere Night Club, Saint Petersburg, Russia	
20	Win	20–0	John Cotterill, Jr.	TKO	1 (8), 2:00	30 May 2009	Hartwall Arena, Helsinki, Finland	
19	Win	19–0	Juan Carlos Rodriguez	UD	8	18 Apr 2009	Töölö Sports Hall, Helsinki, Finland	
18	Win	18–0	Decho Kokietgym	TKO	2 (8), 1:00	14 Feb 2009	Pyynikin palloiluhalli, Tampere, Finland	
17	Win	17–0	Raul Horacio Balbi	TD	6 (8), 0:28	28 Nov 2008	Hartwall Arena, Helsinki, Finland	Unanimous TD after Balbi cut from accidental head clash
16	Win	16–0	Andrzej Sark	TKO	2 (8), 2:15	30 Aug 2008	LänsiAuto Areena, Tampere, Finland	
15	Win	15–0	Shawn Gallegos	UD	10	18 Apr 2008	Töölö Sports Hall, Helsinki, Finland	
14	Win	13–1	Sergejs Savrinovics	RTD	3 (8), 3:00	1 Feb 2008	Töölö Sports Hall, Helsinki, Finland	
13	Win	13–0	Alexander Saltykov	KO	4 (10)	20 Dec 2007	Favorit Gym, Vyborg, Russia	
12	Win	12–0	Nizar Boubaker	TKO	2 (8), 1:08	22 Oct 2007	Töölö Sports Hall, Helsinki, Finland	
11	Win	11–0	Cristian Frias	UD	8	18 May 2007	Urheilutalo, Helsinki, Finland	
10	Win	10–0	Vitaly Olkhovik	TKO	2 (6)	17 Nov 2006	Zimniy Stadion, Saint Petersburg, Russia	
9	Win	9–0	Alexander Saltykov	RTD	7 (8), 3:00	21 Jul 2006	Vyborg Castle, Vyborg, Russia	
8	Win	8–0	Leonti Vorontsuk	UD	4	18 Dec 2005	Central Culture Palace, Vyborg, Russia	
7	Win	7–0	Andrei Sherel	KO	2 (6)	11 May 2005	Minsk, Belarus	
6	Win	6–0	Pavel Melnikov	UD	8	11 Feb 2005	Yubileyny Sports Palace, Saint Petersburg, Russia	
5	Win	5–0	Uladzimir Narushevich	TKO	1 (6)	9 Dec 2004	Reaktor Club, Minsk, Belarus	
4	Win	4–0	Filip Bystrikov	UD	6	16 Jun 2004	State Circus, Minsk, Belarus	
3	Win	3–0	Leonti Vorontsuk	UD	4	15 May 2004	Parc Kronstadt, Saint Petersburg, Russia	
2	Win	2–0	Vadzim Astapuk	UD	4	25 Feb 2004	Reaktor Club, Minsk, Belarus	
1	Win	1–0	Pavel Lyakhov	UD	4	30 Nov 2003	Vyborg, Russia	

Sporting positions
Regional boxing titles
Vacant Title last held by Samuel Malinga	IBO Inter-Continental light-welterweight champion 24 October 2009 – October 2010; Vacated	Vacant Title next held by Chad Bennett
Vacant Title last held by Paul McCloskey	European light-welterweight champion 23 September 2011 – March 2013; Vacated	Vacant Title next held by Michele di Rocco
Preceded by Albert Mensah	IBF International light-welterweight champion 1 December 2012 – 22 February 2014; Lost bid for world title	Vacant Title next held by Martin Gethin
Vacant Title last held by Karen Tevosyan	WBC Baltic light-welterweight champion 1 December 2012 – March 2013; Vacated	Vacant Title next held by Aik Shakhnazaryan
Vacant Title last held by Arman Sargsyan	WBC–CISBB lightweight champion 16 March 2013 – February 2014; Vacated	Vacant Title next held by Elnur Samedov
Preceded by Alisher Rahimov	WBC Baltic lightweight champion 16 March 2013 – November 2013; Vacated	Vacant Title next held by Fedor Papazov
