= Sorin Tănasie =

Romanian boxer

Sorin Eugen Tănasie
Personal information
- Nickname: Pantera
- Nationality: (Romania) Romanian
- Born: June 8, 1980 (age 46) Craiova, Romania
- Height: 5 ft 3 in (160 cm)
- Weight: Bantamweight

Boxing career
- Stance: Orthodox

Boxing record
- Total fights: 19
- Wins: 17
- Win by KO: 7
- Losses: 1
- Draws: 1
- No contests: 0

Sorin Tănasie (born June 8, 1980, in Craiova, Romania) is a professional bantamweight boxer.

== Amateur highlights ==
As an amateur he claimed a bronze medal at the 2002 European Amateur Boxing Championships in Perm, Russia and a gold medal in 1998 Junior World Amateur Boxing Championships in Buenos Aires, Argentina.
