= Karim El Ouazghari =

Spanish boxer (born 1979)

Personal information
- Nickname: El Diablo ("The Devil")
- Nationality: Spanish
- Born: Karim El Ouazghari El Boazzati; 17 December 1979 (age 46) Barcelona, Spain
- Height: 1.74 m (5 ft 9 in)
- Weight: Lightweight; Light-welterweight

Boxing career
- Stance: Orthodox

Boxing record
- Total fights: 26
- Wins: 17
- Win by KO: 4
- Losses: 7
- Draws: 2

Karim El Ouazghari El Boazzati (born 17 December 1979) is a Spanish former professional boxer who competed from 2006 to 2015. He held the Spanish lightweight title from 2010 to 2012, and challenged once for the EBU European lightweight title in 2011.

== Professional career ==
Born in Spain to Moroccan parents, El Ouazghari made his professional debut on 6 October 2006, winning a four-round unanimous decision (UD) over Sento Martinez, who also debuted. On 2 April 2011, El Ouazghari fought for the European lightweight title against undefeated champion John Murray. In what was described as a "sluggish" and "laboured" performance by Murray, El Ouazghari went on to lose via UD but redeemed himself by putting up a tough fight. Further attempts to win regional titles resulted in losses to Serhiy Fedchenko on 20 April 2013 (UD), Kevin Mitchell on 14 December 2013 (ninth-round stoppage), Stephen Ormond on 4 April 2014 (fifth-round stoppage), and Artem Haroyan on 13 November 2015 (second-round stoppage).

== Professional boxing record ==
26 fights	17 wins	7 losses
By knockout	4	5
By decision	13	2
Draws	2	

No.	Result	Record	Opponent	Type	Round, time	Date	Location	Notes
26	Loss	17–7–2	Artem Haroyan	TKO	2 (12)	13 Nov 2015	Magma Arte & Congresos, Adeje, Canary Islands	For vacant WBA Continental (Europe) lightweight title
25	Win	17–6–2	Miklos Szilagyi	PTS	6	20 Jun 2015	FC Barcelona, Barcelona, Spain	
24	Loss	16–6–2	Félix Verdejo	TKO	4 (8), 1:27	13 Dec 2014	2300 Arena, Philadelphia, Pennsylvania, US	
23	Loss	16–5–2	Stephen Ormond	TKO	5 (10), 2:09	4 Apr 2014	Odyssey Arena, Belfast, Northern Ireland	For WBO European lightweight title
22	Win	16–4–2	Santos Medrano	UD	4	15 Feb 2014	SFERIC, Terrassa, Spain	
21	Loss	15–4–2	Kevin Mitchell	TKO	9 (12), 2:07	14 Dec 2013	ExCeL, London, England	For IBF Inter-Continental lightweight title
20	Loss	15–3–2	Serhiy Fedchenko	UD	12	20 Apr 2013	Palace of Sports "Lokomotiv", Kharkiv, Ukraine	For WBO European junior-welterweight title
19	Win	15–2–2	Michael Escobar	UD	6	30 Nov 2012	Hotel Fira Congress, L'Hospitalet de Llobregat, Spain	
18	Win	14–2–2	Jose Antonio Elizabeth	UD	8	6 Jul 2012	Palau de Congressos de Catalunya, Barcelona, Spain	
17	Win	13–2–2	Matias Garcia	UD	6	25 Nov 2011	Pabellón Municipal Joan Creus, Ripollet, Spain	
16	Win	12–2–2	Johnny Antequera	UD	6	21 Oct 2011	La Farga, L'Hospitalet de Llobregat, Spain	
15	Loss	11–2–2	John Murray	UD	12	2 Apr 2011	York Hall, London, England	For European lightweight title
14	Win	11–1–2	Jorge Lohoba	UD	10	12 Nov 2010	Hotel Hesperia Tower, L'Hospitalet de Llobregat, Spain	Retained Spanish lightweight title
13	Win	10–1–2	Armando Candel	KO	2 (8)	21 May 2010	Hotel FrontAir Congress, Sant Boi de Llobregat, Spain	
12	Win	9–1–2	Jesus Garcia Simon	KO	2 (10)	19 Feb 2010	Cotxeres de Sants, Barcelona, Spain	Won vacant Spanish lightweight title
11	Win	8–1–2	Fernando Guevara	TKO	4 (6)	11 Jul 2009	Poliesportiu Municipal Bellvitge Sergio Manzano, L'Hospitalet de Llobregat, Spain	
10	Win	7–1–2	Euclides Espitia	UD	6	14 Nov 2008	Pabellón Municipal Joan Creus, Ripollet, Spain	
9	Win	6–1–2	Gabriel Valencia	TKO	4 (6)	26 Jul 2008	Centre Civic Casinet d'Hostafrancs, Barcelona, Spain	
8	Loss	5–1–2	Daniel Rasilla	TKO	4 (10)	26 Apr 2008	Polideportivo Municipal, Revilla, Spain	For Spanish lightweight title
7	Draw	5–0–2	Jesus Garcia Simon	PTS	6	8 Feb 2008	Poliesportiu Fum d'Estampa, L'Hospitalet de Llobregat, Spain	
6	Draw	5–0–1	Felix Soria	PTS	6	23 Nov 2007	Pabellón Municipal Joan Creus, Ripollet, Spain	
5	Win	5–0	Alex Bone	UD	4	20 Jul 2007	Poliesportiu Fum d'Estampa, L'Hospitalet de Llobregat, Spain	
4	Win	4–0	Veselin Dimitrov Vasilev	UD	4	4 May 2007	Pabellón Municipal Joan Creus, Ripollet, Spain	
3	Win	3–0	Juan Zapata	PTS	4	9 Feb 2007	Poliesportiu Fum d'Estampa, L'Hospitalet de Llobregat, Spain	
2	Win	2–0	Marques Gil	UD	4	1 Dec 2006	Poliesportiu Fum d'Estampa, L'Hospitalet de Llobregat, Spain	
1	Win	1–0	Sento Martinez	UD	4	6 Oct 2006	Poliesportiu Fum d'Estampa, L'Hospitalet de Llobregat, Spain	

Sporting positions
Regional boxing titles
Vacant Title last held by Hoang Sang Nguyen	Spanish lightweight champion 19 February 2010 – March 2012; Vacated	Vacant Title next held by Emiliano Casal
