= Abdul Tebazalwa =

Ugandan boxer (born 1979)

Personal information
- Nickname: Cobra
- Nationality: Ugandan
- Born: 30 September 1979 (age 46)
- Height: 173 cm (5 ft 8 in)
- Weight: Lightweight; Featherweight; Super bantamweight

Boxing career
- Stance: Orthodox

Boxing record
- Total fights: 20
- Wins: 13
- Win by KO: 10
- Losses: 7

Abdul Tebazalwa (born 30 September 1979) is a Ugandan former professional boxer who competed from 2003 to 2014, winning the African super bantamweight title in 2006. As an amateur, he competed in the men's bantamweight event at the 2000 Summer Olympics.

== Professional boxing record ==
20 fights	13 wins	7 losses
By knockout	10	0
By decision	3	7
Draws	0	

No.	Result	Record	Opponent	Type	Round, time	Date	Location	Notes
20	Loss	13–7	(Sweden) Suro Ismailov	UD	6	22 Nov 2014	Amiralen, Malmö, Sweden	
19	Win	13–6	(Venezuela) Franklin Varela	UD	4	27 Mar 2014	Göta Källare, Stockholm, Sweden	
18	Loss	12–6	(Republic of Ireland) Patrick Hyland	UD	12	25 Jul 2009	(Republic of Ireland) National Basketball Arena, Dublin, Ireland	For vacant IBF International featherweight title
17	Loss	12–5	(Uzbekistan) Bekhzod Nabiev	UD	8	24 May 2009	Favorit Gym, Vyborg, Russia	
16	Win	12–4	(Kenya) Joseph Akhahonya	KO	1 (12)	19 Dec 2008	Lugogo Stadium, Kampala, Uganda	Retained UBO featherweight title
15	Loss	11–4	(Romania) Viorel Simion	UD	8	1 Aug 2008	Sala Sporturilor, Piatra Neamț, Romania	
14	Loss	11–3	(Russia) Vyacheslav Gusev	UD	12	12 Apr 2008	Palace of Sport UGMC, Verkhnyaya Pyshma, Russia	For vacant WBA Inter-Continental featherweight title
13	Win	11–2	(Tanzania) Obote Ameme	TKO	5 (12), 1:58	22 Dec 2007	Nakivubo Stadium, Kampala, Uganda	Won vacant UBO featherweight title
12	Loss	10–2	(South Africa) Tshifhiwa Munyai	PTS	8	30 Nov 2007	(United Kingdom) Leisure Center, London, England	
11	Loss	10–1	(Mongolia) Choi Tseveenpurev	SD	12	7 Oct 2007	(United Kingdom) Tara Leisure Centre, Shaw, England	For WBF featherweight title
10	Win	10–0	(Georgia (country)) Nikoloz Berkatsashvili	UD	4	18 Aug 2007	Eriksdalshallen, Stockholm, Sweden	
9	Win	9–0	(Tanzania) Godfrey Mawe	KO	2 (?)	26 Nov 2006	Little Flowers Arena, Kampala, Uganda	
8	Win	8–0	(Zimbabwe) Peter Pambeni	KO	5 (12)	15 Oct 2005	Little Flowers Arena, Kampala, Uganda	Won vacant IBF Continental Africa featherweight title
7	Win	7–0	(Zambia) Godwin Mutampuka	TKO	1 (12)	26 Jan 2005	Nakivubo Stadium, Kampala, Uganda	Retained African super-bantamweight title
6	Win	6–0	(Tanzania) Ajibu Salum	TKO	1 (12)	31 Jul 2004	Little Flowers Arena, Kampala, Uganda	Won vacant African super-bantamweight title
5	Win	5–0	(Uganda) Nsamba Walumbe	TKO	1 (12)	20 Apr 2004	Nakivubo Stadium, Kampala, Uganda	Won Ugandan featherweight title
4	Win	4–0	(Uganda) Michael Onen	KO	1 (?)	13 Dec 2003	Nakivubo Stadium, Kampala, Uganda	
3	Win	3–0	(Kenya) George Owenge	PTS	6	1 Nov 2003	Eden Gardens, Kampala, Uganda	
2	Win	2–0	(Uganda) Nsamba Walumbe	KO	4 (?)	10 Oct 2003	Uganda	
1	Win	1–0	(Uganda) Richard Ddungu	TKO	1 (6)	6 Jun 2003	Nakivubo Stadium, Kampala, Uganda	
