= Marat Tovmasian =

Armenian amateur boxer

Medal record

Men's Boxing

Representing Armenia

European Championships
Bronze medal – third place	2002 Perm	Heavyweight

Marat Tovmasian (Armenian: Մարատ Թովմասյան) is an Armenian amateur boxer.

Tovmasian won a bronze medal at the 2002 European Amateur Boxing Championships in the heavyweight division.
