= Ville Piispanen =

Finnish boxer (born 1983)

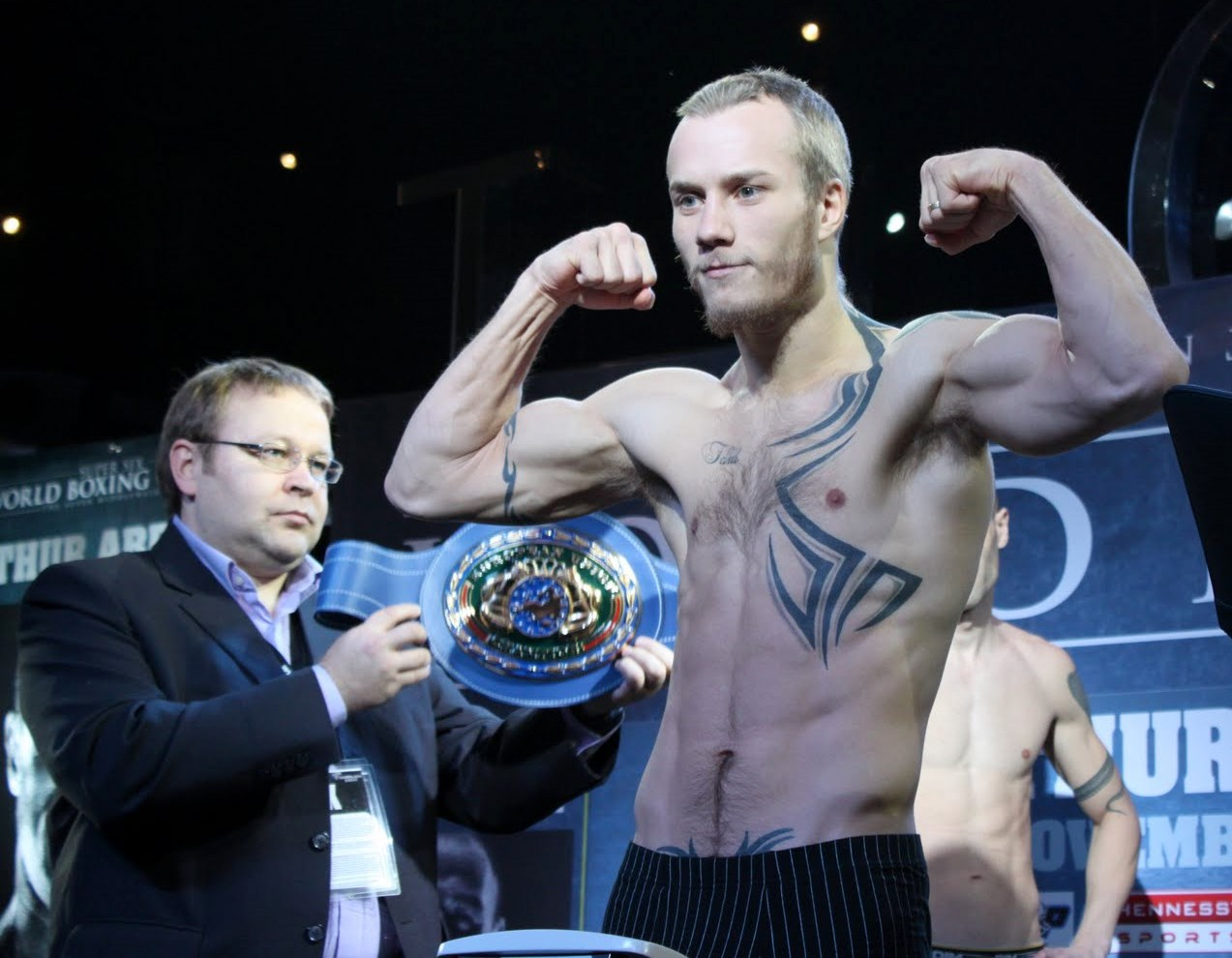
- Piispanen (right) with manager Pekka Mäki in 2010. Mäki is shown holding the European Union super-lightweight title.

Personal information
- Nationality: Finnish
- Born: 4 December 1983 (age 42) Lahti, Finland
- Height: 1.68 m (5 ft 6 in)
- Weight: Light-welterweight

Boxing career
- Stance: Orthodox

Boxing record
- Total fights: 29
- Wins: 19
- Win by KO: 6
- Losses: 7
- Draws: 3
Medal record
Men's amateur boxing
Finnish national championships
Silver medal – second place	2003 Tampere	Lightweight
Bronze medal – third place	2002 Helsinki	Bantamweight
Bronze medal – third place	2005 Lahti	Light-welterweight

Ville Piispanen (born 4 December 1983) is a Finnish former professional boxer who competed from 2005 to 2015. He held the European Union super-lightweight title from 2010 to 2011, and challenged once for the European super-lightweight title in 2013.

== Amateur career ==
Piispanen won a bronze medal in the bantamweight division at the 2002 Finnish national amateur championships. He followed this up with silver at lightweight in 2003 and bronze at light-welterweight in 2005.

== Professional career ==
On 30 September 2005, Piispanen made his professional debut by winning a four-round unanimous decision against Arturs Jaskuls, who also debuted. Piispanen fought for his first regional title against European Union super-lightweight champion Giuseppe Lauri on 19 December 2008, but was stopped in six rounds. Two years later, on 18 July 2010, Piispanen fought again for the now-vacant title, stopping Emanuele de Prophetis in four rounds to become champion.

His first defence, on 27 November 2010, against Daniel Rasilla, ended in a split draw. Piispanen was not as fortunate in his second defence, on 3 June 2011, as he lost to Vittorio Oi via seventh-round unanimous technical decision. On 13 October 2012, Piispanen attempted to regain his title, now made vacant, against Lenny Daws. After twelve rounds, Piispanen lost a unanimous decision. A chance to win the full European light-welterweight title came on 21 December 2013, against Michele di Rocco, but Piispanen lost again via unanimous decision.

== Professional boxing record ==
29 fights	19 wins	7 losses
By knockout	6	3
By decision	13	4
Draws	3	

No.	Result	Record	Opponent	Type	Round, time	Date	Location	Notes
29	Loss	19–7–3	Jose Manuel Lopez Clavero	PTS	6	23 May 2015	Benalmádena, Andalusia, Spain	
28	Loss	19–6–3	Luca Giacon	RTD	6 (12)	29 Nov 2014	Pabellon de las Lagunas, Andalusia, Spain	For WBA Continental (Europe) light-welterweight title
27	Win	19–5–3	Filip Rzadek	UD	6	6 Sep 2014	Pyynikin Palloiluhalli, Tampere, Finland	
26	Loss	18–5–3	Bradley Saunders	KO	1 (10), 1:21	7 Jun 2014	Metro Radio Arena, Newcastle, England	For vacant WBO Inter-Continental light-welterweight title
25	Win	18–4–3	Janneh Haruna	UD	6	17 May 2014	Salohalli, Salo, Finland	
24	Loss	17–4–3	Michele di Rocco	UD	12	21 Dec 2013	Pala Badminton, Milan, Italy	For European light-welterweight title
23	Win	17–3–3	Juris Ivanovs	PTS	4	17 Jun 2013	Ringside Gym, Helsinki, Finland	
22	Loss	16–3–3	Lenny Daws	UD	12	13 Oct 2012	Bluewater, Stone, England	For vacant European Union light-welterweight title
21	Win	16–2–3	Iliyar Nasirov	UD	6	3 Mar 2012	Ringside Gym, Espoo, Finland	
20	Loss	15–2–3	Vittorio Oi	TD	7 (12), 1:20	3 Jun 2011	Pomezia, Italy	Lost European Union light-welterweight title; Unanimous TD: Oi cut from an accidental head clash
19	Draw	15–1–3	Daniel Rasilla	SD	12	27 Nov 2010	Hartwall Arena, Helsinki, Finland	Retained European Union light-welterweight title
18	Win	15–1–2	Emanuele de Prophetis	RTD	4 (12), 3:00	18 Jul 2010	Sequals, Italy	Won vacant European Union light-welterweight title
17	Win	14–1–2	Luis Acevedo	KO	2 (6), 1:49	11 May 2010	Varuboden Areena, Kirkkonummi, Finland	
16	Draw	13–1–2	Jaakko Myllylä	MD	10	27 Nov 2009	Pyynikin Palloiluhalli, Tampere, Finland	For vacant Finnish light-welterweight title
15	Win	13–1–1	Sento Martinez	UD	6	22 Aug 2009	The Circus, Helsinki, Finland	
14	Loss	12–1–1	Giuseppe Lauri	TKO	6 (12)	19 Dec 2008	PalaLido, Milan, Italy	For European Union light-welterweight title
13	Win	12–0–1	Cristian Chavez	TKO	1 (6), 2:12	28 Nov 2008	Hartwall Arena, Helsinki, Finland	
12	Win	11–0–1	Cristian Frias	UD	8	14 Apr 2008	Töölö Sports Hall, Helsinki, Finland	
11	Win	10–0–1	Richard Asare	UD	6	1 Feb 2008	Töölö Sports Hall, Helsinki, Finland	
10	Win	9–0–1	Wladimir Borov	UD	6	22 Oct 2007	Töölö Sports Hall, Helsinki, Finland	
9	Win	8–0–1	Juris Ivanovs	TKO	4 (6), 2:31	21 Apr 2007	Urheilutalo, Lahti, Finland	
8	Draw	7–0–1	Alexander Saltykov	SD	6	30 Jan 2007	Hartwall Arena, Helsinki, Finland	
7	Win	7–0	Lubos Priehradnik	TKO	6 (6), 1:52	13 Jan 2007	Urheiluhalli, Porvoo, Finland	
6	Win	6–0	Manuel Gomes	UD	6	6 Oct 2006	Hartwall Arena, Helsinki, Finland	
5	Win	5–0	Andis Didzus	KO	1 (4), 0:41	16 Sep 2006	Tervahalli, Kemi, Finland	
4	Win	4–0	Maurycy Gojko	UD	6	5 May 2006	Töölö Sports Hall, Helsinki, Finland	
3	Win	3–0	Ladislav Ocetek	UD	4	25 Mar 2006	Tervahalli, Kemi, Finland	
2	Win	2–0	Ladislav Ocetek	UD	4	16 Jan 2006	Töölö Sports Hall, Helsinki, Finland	
1	Win	1–0	Arturs Jaskuls	UD	4	30 Sep 2005	Studio 51, Helsinki, Finland	

Sporting positions
Regional boxing titles
Vacant Title last held by Giuseppe Lauri	European Union super-lightweight champion 18 July 2010 – 3 June 2011	Succeeded by Vittorio Oi
