= 2002 European Amateur Boxing Championships =

Boxing competitions

- Host city: Perm
- Country: Russia
- Dates: 12–21 July

The Men's 2002 European Amateur Boxing Championships were held in Perm, Russia from July 12 to July 21. The 34th edition of thi bi-annual competition was organised by the European governing body for amateur boxing, EABA.

== Medal winners ==
Event	Gold	Silver	Bronze
Light Flyweight (– 48 kilograms)	Sergey Kazakov; Russia	Veaceslav Gojan; Moldova	Rudolf Dydi; Slovakia Eugen Tanasie; Romania
Flyweight (– 51 kilograms)	Georgi Balakshin; Russia	Aleksandar Aleksandrov; Bulgaria	Igor Samoilenco; Moldova Jérôme Thomas; France
Bantamweight (– 54 kilograms)	Khavazhi Khatsygov; Belarus	Gennady Kovalev; Russia	Vladimir Cucereanu; Romania Ali Hallab; France
Featherweight (– 57 kilograms)	Raimkul Malakhbekov; Russia	Shahin Imranov; Azerbaijan	(Georgia (country)) Konstantine Kupatadze; Georgia Viorel Simion; Romania
Lightweight (– 60 kilograms)	Alexander Maletin; Russia	Boris Georgiev; Bulgaria	Michele di Rocco; Italy Selçuk Aydın; Turkey
Light Welterweight (– 63.5 kilograms)	Dimitar Shtilianov; Bulgaria	Willy Blain; France	Brunet Zamora; Italy Dmitry Pavlichenko; Russia
Welterweight (– 67 kilograms)	Timur Gaydalov; Russia	Alexander Bokalo; Ukraine	Sebastian Zbik; Germany Dorel Simion; Romania
Light Middleweight (– 71 kilograms)	Andrey Mishin; Russia	Lukas Wilaschek; Germany	Marian Simion; Romania Ivan Gaivan; Moldova
Middleweight (– 75 kilograms)	Oleg Mashkin; Ukraine	Károly Balzsay; Hungary	Jani Rauhala; Finland Mamadou Djambang; France
Light Heavyweight (– 81 kilograms)	Mikhail Gala; Russia	John Dovi; France	István Szucs; Hungary Viktor Perun; Ukraine
Heavyweight (– 91 kilograms)	Evgeny Makarenko; Russia	Vyacheslav Uzelkov; Ukraine	Viktar Zuyev; Belarus Marat Tovmasian; Armenia
Super Heavyweight (+ 91 kilograms)	Alexander Povetkin; Russia	Roberto Cammarelle; Italy	Sebastian Köber; Germany Artyom Tsarikov; Ukraine
