= Juho Tolppola =

Finnish boxer

Personal information
- Nickname: TNT
- Nationality: Finnish
- Born: 5 October 1981 (age 44) Vantaa, Greater Helsinki, Finland
- Height: 1.73 m (5 ft 8 in)
- Weight: Light-welterweight; Welterweight

Boxing career
- Stance: Orthodox

Boxing record
- Total fights: 33
- Wins: 25
- Win by KO: 9
- Losses: 6
- Draws: 1
- No contests: 1
Medal record
Men's amateur boxing
Finnish national championships
Gold medal – first place	1998 Helsinki	Light-flyweight
Gold medal – first place	2000 Helsinki	Flyweight
Gold medal – first place	2001 Helsinki	Bantamweight
Silver medal – second place	1999 Helsinki	Bantamweight
Representing Finland
European Championships
Bronze medal – third place	2000 Tampere	Flyweight

Juho Tolppola (born 5 October 1981) is a Finnish professional boxer who has challenged twice for the European super-lightweight title in 2008. As an amateur he is a three-time Finnish national champion and a bronze medallist at the 2000 European Championships. From 2015 to 2017, Tolppola served a two-year ban from boxing due to doping.

== Amateur career ==
In his amateur career, Tolppola scored 135 wins in 175 fights, including four consecutive medals at the Finnish national amateur championships: gold in 1998 (light-flyweight), 2000 (flyweight) and 2001 (bantamweight), and silver in 1999 (bantamweight). At the 2000 European Championships, he won a bronze medal in the flyweight division.

== Professional career ==
Tolppola made his professional debut on 10 December 2001, winning a four-round points decision over Anton Vontszemu. His first opportunity at a regional championship came on 26 November 2004 against Michele Orlando for the vacant IBF International welterweight title. Fighting outside of Finland for the first time as a professional, Tolppola lost a narrow twelve-round split decision in Orlando's native Italy. Two months later, on 28 January 2005, Tolppola went on the road again, losing a ten-round points decision to David Barnes in Scotland.

Between 2007 and 2009, Tolppola challenged for both the European and European Union super-lightweight titles twice each, but lost all of these bouts. In his fourth attempt, against Giuseppe Lauri on 30 May 2009, the fight ended in a highly controversial manner when Tolppola was first disqualified after ten rounds due to repeated fouls, after which his father stormed the ring and punched the referee.

After taking a five-year break from the sport, Tolppola returned to the ring on 9 May 2014. He would score three consecutive wins by unanimous decision before challenging unbeaten Matias Laitinen for the vacant Finnish welterweight title on 23 May 2015. Tolppola won a wide ten-round unanimous decision, but in September the result was changed to a no contest after he failed a drugs test for the use of hydrochlorothiazide (a diuretic to aid weight loss). The Finnish Professional Boxing Association subsequently handed Tolppola a two-year ban from boxing, effective from the Laitinen fight.

In April 2016, Tolppola announced his intention to appeal the decision, maintaining his innocence and calling into question the Association's testing procedures. This appeal was rejected by a court in June of that year, who determined that there were no sufficient grounds for lifting his ban. Boxing promoter Joona Jalkanen announced in October that Tolppola would return to the ring immediately after his ban was lifted, on 13 May 2017, and would be looking to challenge for a European title at some stage, but the fight did not take place.

== Professional boxing record ==
33 fights	25 wins	6 losses
By knockout	9	1
By decision	16	4
By disqualification	0	1
Draws	1	
No contests	1	

No.	Result	Record	Opponent	Type	Round, time	Date	Location	Notes
33	NC	25–6–1 (1)	Matias Laitinen	UD	10	23 May 2015	PowerPark, Kauhava, Finland	Originally a UD win for Tolppola, later ruled an NC after he failed a drug test
32	Win	25–6–1	Szabolcs Szabo	UD	6	25 Apr 2015	Hartwall Arena, Helsinki, Finland	
31	Win	24–6–1	Emanuele De Prophetis	UD	8	20 Sep 2014	Hartwall Arena, Helsinki, Finland	
30	Win	23–6–1	Suro Ismailov	UD	6	9 May 2014	Urheilutalo, Helsinki, Finland	
29	Loss	22–6–1	Giuseppe Lauri	DQ	10 (12), 2:10	30 May 2009	Hartwall Arena, Helsinki, Finland	For European Union super-lightweight title; Tolppola disqualified for repeated fouls
28	Win	22–5–1	Maurycy Gojko	UD	6	14 Feb 2009	Pyynikin Palloiluhalli, Tampere, Finland	
27	Loss	21–5–1	Gianluca Branco	TKO	9 (12)	19 Dec 2008	PalaLido, Milan, Italy	For European super-lightweight title
26	Win	21–4–1	Walter Sergio Gomez	UD	10	18 Apr 2008	Töölö Sports Hall, Helsinki, Finland	
25	Loss	20–4–1	Colin Lynes	UD	12	25 Jan 2008	Goresbrook Leisure Centre, London, England	For European super-lightweight title
24	Draw	20–3–1	Alexander Saltykov	TD	4 (6), 1:21	22 Oct 2007	Töölö Sports Hall, Helsinki, Finland	TD after Tolppola was cut from an accidental head clash
23	Win	20–3	Arturs Jaskuls	UD	6	18 May 2007	Urheilutalo, Helsinki, Finland	
22	Loss	19–3	Michele di Rocco	UD	12	30 Jan 2007	Hartwall Arena, Helsinki, Finland	For European Union super-lightweight title
21	Win	19–2	Gabriel Mapouka	UD	10	6 Oct 2006	Hartwall Arena, Helsinki, Finland	
20	Win	18–2	Nikita Zaytsev	UD	10	5 May 2006	Töölö Sports Hall, Helsinki, Finland	
19	Win	17–2	Arturs Jaskuls	UD	6	25 Mar 2006	Tervahalli, Kemi, Finland	
18	Win	16–2	Ariel Francisco Burgos	UD	10	16 Jan 2006	Töölö Sports Hall, Helsinki, Finland	
17	Win	15–2	Vadim Gabrielyan	TKO	4 (6), 1:21	30 Sep 2005	Studio 51, Helsinki, Finland	
16	Win	14–2	Ivo Golakov	TKO	3 (6), 2:16	18 Jun 2005	Porvoo, Finland	
15	Win	13–2	Rozalin Nasibulin	UD	6	4 Apr 2005	Töölö Sports Hall, Helsinki, Finland	
14	Win	12–2	Adam Zadworny	KO	4 (6), 0:43	19 Mar 2005	Premi Nightclub, Helsinki, Finland	
13	Loss	11–2	David Barnes	PTS	10	28 Jan 2005	Braehead Arena, Glasgow, Scotland	
12	Win	11–1	Deniss Aleksejevs	TKO	4 (4)	10 Dec 2004	Niiralan monttu, Kuopio, Finland	
11	Loss	10–1	Michele Orlando	SD	12	26 Nov 2004	PalaSegesta, Calatafimi-Segesta, Italy	For vacant IBF International welterweight title
10	Win	10–0	Alvaro Moreno Gamboa	UD	8	4 Sep 2004	Levi, Kittilä, Finland	
9	Win	9–0	Pavel Nemecek	TKO	4 (6)	16 Jul 2004	Helsinki, Finland	
8	Win	8–0	Leonti Vorontsuk	UD	8	23 Apr 2004	Myyrmäki Sporthouse, Vantaa, Finland	
7	Win	7–0	Patrik Prokopecz	TKO	5 (6)	28 Feb 2004	Hotel Lapinportti, Rovaniemi, Finland	
6	Win	6–0	Tibor Rafael	KO	2 (6), 0:37	13 Dec 2003	Aladdin Bar & Night Club, Espoo, Finland	
5	Win	5–0	Andrei Komiagin	TKO	2 (6)	17 May 2003	Jatuli, Haukipudas, Finland	
4	Win	4–0	Oscar Blanco	UD	6	15 Feb 2003	Töölö Sports Hall, Helsinki, Finland	
3	Win	3–0	Konstantin Flachbart	TKO	2 (4)	13 Sep 2002	City Civil Defence Shelter, Kirkkonummi, Finland	
2	Win	2–0	Sergei Lazarenko	UD	4	7 Feb 2002	City Civil Defence Shelter, Kirkkonummi, Finland	
1	Win	1–0	Anton Vontszemu	UD	4	10 Dec 2001	Ice Hall, Helsinki, Finland	
