= Daniel Rasilla =

Spanish boxer (born 1980)

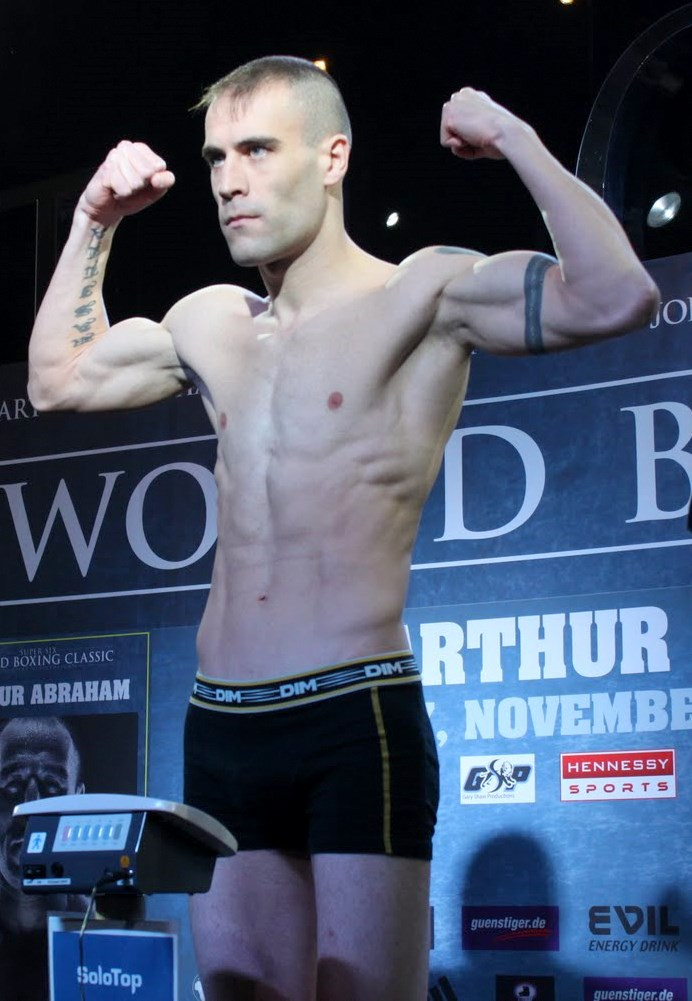
- Rasilla in 2010

Personal information
- Nickname: Cobra
- Nationality: Spanish
- Born: Daniel Rasilla Colaso; 28 April 1980 (age 46) Santander, Cantabria, Spain
- Height: 1.80 m (5 ft 11 in)
- Weight: Lightweight; Light-welterweight; Welterweight

Boxing career
- Reach: 183 cm (72 in)
- Stance: Orthodox

Boxing record
- Total fights: 42
- Wins: 31
- Win by KO: 7
- Losses: 9
- Draws: 2

Daniel Rasilla Colaso (born 28 April 1980) is a Spanish professional boxer. He held the Spanish lightweight and light-welterweight titles between 2007 and 2013, and has challenged once for the European light-welterweight title in 2009.

== Professional career ==
Rasilla made his professional debut on 4 February 2006, winning a four-round unanimous decision (UD) against Marques Gil, who also debuted. On 15 December 2007, he defeated Hoang Sang Nguyen via UD to win the Spanish lightweight title. Once defence was made, against Karim El Ouazghari on 26 April 2008. In a rematch with Nguyen on 29 November 2008, Rasilla lost the title after being stopped in two rounds. On 21 March 2009, fighting out of his native Spain for the first time, he travelled to Ireland and lost a UD against Andrew Murray, with the vacant European Union lightweight title at stake.

In another trip away from home on 6 November 2009, this time to Northern Ireland to fight for the vacant European light-welterweight title, Rasilla was stopped in nine rounds by Paul McCloskey. On 15 May 2010, Rasilla won the vacant Spanish light-welterweight title by knocking out Juan Zapata in five rounds. A third attempt to win a major regional championship—the European Union light-welterweight title—ended in a split draw against defending champion Ville Piispanen on 27 November 2010.

== Professional boxing record ==
42 fights	31 wins	9 losses
By knockout	7	3
By decision	24	6
Draws	2	

No.	Result	Record	Opponent	Type	Round, time	Date	Location	Notes
42	Win	31–9–2	Ryan Peleguer	PTS	6	28 Nov 2015	Pabellón Polideportivo Pedro Velarde, Maliaño, Spain	
41	Loss	30–9–2	Florin Cardos	UD	10	21 Feb 2015	Polyvalent Hall, Cluj-Napoca, Romania	For vacant WBC Mediterranean welterweight title
40	Win	30–8–2	Feliks Kleins	UD	6	17 Jan 2015	Polideportivo, Solares, Spain	
39	Loss	29–8–2	Aitor Nieto	KO	5 (10)	20 Sep 2014	Pabellón Polideportivo Pedro Velarde, Maliaño, Spain	For Spanish welterweight title
38	Win	29–7–2	Miguel Aguilar	PTS	6	14 Jun 2014	Pabellón Municipal, Argoños, Spain	
37	Win	28–7–2	Ludovic Duval	PTS	8	17 May 2014	Complexe sportif Marcel Sauvage, Notre-Dame-de-Bondeville, France	
36	Loss	27–7–2	Aitor Nieto	UD	10	11 Apr 2014	Palacio Municipal de Deportes, Oviedo, Spain	For Spanish welterweight title
35	Win	27–6–2	Fran Gonzalez	PTS	6	8 Mar 2014	Pabellón Polideportivo Pedro Velarde, Maliaño, Spain	
34	Loss	26–6–2	Ceferino Rodríguez	TKO	3 (6)	14 Dec 2013	Pabellón Polideportivo Pedro Velarde, Maliaño, Spain	For European Union welterweight title
33	Win	26–5–2	Michael Isaac Carrero	UD	6	19 Oct 2013	Bolera Jesus Vela, Renedo de Piélagos, Spain	
32	Loss	25–5–2	Sandor Martin	UD	10	6 Jul 2013	Pabellón Bon Pastor, Barcelona, Spain	For vacant Spanish light-welterweight title
31	Loss	25–4–2	Ruben Nieto	UD	10	2 Feb 2013	Palacio de Deportes, Madrid, Spain	Lost Spanish light-welterweight title
30	Win	25–3–2	Paulo Hermezilha	TKO	6 (6)	1 Dec 2012	Pabellón Polideportivo Pedro Velarde, Maliaño, Spain	
29	Win	24–3–2	Jesus Garcia Simon	TKO	5 (6)	27 Oct 2012	Bolera Jesus Vela, Renedo de Piélagos, Spain	
28	Win	23–3–2	Iban Gallardo	UD	6	14 Sep 2012	Beranga, Spain	
27	Win	22–3–2	Sergio Gomez	UD	12	26 May 2012	Pabellón Polideportivo Pedro Velarde, Maliaño, Spain	
26	Win	21–3–2	Jose de Jesus Lopez	PTS	6	28 Apr 2012	Pabellón Polideportivo Pedro Velarde, Maliaño, Spain	
25	Draw	20–3–2	Eloy Iglesias	TD	5 (6)	17 Dec 2011	Maliaño, Spain	Unanimous TD after Rasilla was cut from an accidental head clash
24	Win	20–3–1	Matias Garcia	PTS	6	29 Oct 2011	Pabellón Polideportivo Pedro Velarde, Maliaño, Spain	
23	Win	19–3–1	Johnny Antequera	UD	12	29 Jul 2011	Pabellon de la Albericia, Santander, Spain	Won vacant WBC Latino light-welterweight title
22	Draw	18–3–1	Ville Piispanen	SD	12	27 Nov 2010	Hartwall Arena, Helsinki, Finland	For European Union light-welterweight title
21	Win	18–3	Robert Cristea	UD	6	9 Jul 2010	Pabellón Polideportivo Pedro Velarde, Maliaño, Spain	
20	Win	17–3	Juan Zapata	KO	5 (10)	15 May 2010	Polideportivo Municipal, Revilla, Spain	
19	Win	16–3	Juan Alberto Martin	PTS	6	20 Feb 2010	El Astillero, Spain	
18	Loss	15–3	Paul McCloskey	TKO	9 (12), 2:15	6 Nov 2009	Meadowbank Sports Arena, Magherafelt, Northern Ireland	For vacant European light-welterweight title
17	Win	15–2	Euclides Espitia	PTS	6	9 Oct 2009	Liencres, Spain	
16	Win	14–2	Juan Zapata	MD	10	26 Jun 2009	Polideportivo Municipal, Revilla, Spain	Won vacant Spanish light-welterweight title
15	Win	13–2	Marcos Munoz	UD	6	9 May 2009	Polideportivo Municipal, Revilla, Spain	
14	Loss	12–2	Andrew Murray	UD	12	21 Mar 2009	O2 Arena, Dublin, Ireland	For vacant European Union lightweight title
13	Win	12–1	Marius Racaru	UD	12	28 Feb 2009	Polideportivo Municipal, Revilla, Spain	
12	Loss	11–1	Hoang Sang Nguyen	PTS	6	29 Nov 2008	Aqua Pirámide, Maliaño, Spain	Lost Spanish lightweight title
11	Win	11–0	Fernando Guevara	TKO	4 (6)	27 Jul 2008	Polideportivo Municipal, Liencres, Spain	
10	Win	10–0	Marian Cazacu	PTS	8	31 May 2008	Complejo Deportivo La Cantábrica, El Astillero, Spain	
9	Win	9–0	Karim El Ouazghari	TKO	4 (10)	26 Apr 2008	Polideportivo Municipal, Revilla, Spain	Retained Spanish lightweight title
8	Win	8–0	Hoang Sang Nguyen	UD	10	15 Dec 2007	Polideportivo Municipal, Revilla, Spain	Won Spanish lightweight title
7	Win	7–0	Benjamin Robles Murry	PTS	6	28 Jul 2007	El Astillero, Spain	
6	Win	6–0	Sento Martinez	PTS	6	20 Jul 2007	El Astillero, Spain	
5	Win	5–0	Jorge Lohoba	UD	6	17 Mar 2007	Santander, Spain	
4	Win	4–0	Jamal Hajji	TKO	6 (6)	23 Dec 2006	Pabellon de la Cantabrica, Santander, Spain	
3	Win	3–0	Kamal Khallou	KO	1 (4)	28 Jul 2006	Santander, Spain	
2	Win	2–0	Sergei Nikitin	PTS	4	10 Jun 2006	Santander, Spain	
1	Win	1–0	Marques Gil	UD	4	4 Feb 2006	El Astillero, Spain	

Sporting positions
Regional boxing titles
Preceded by Hoang Sang Nguyen	Spanish lightweight champion 15 December 2007 – 29 November 2008	Succeeded by Hoang Sang Nguyen
Vacant Title last held by Héctor Moreira	Spanish light-welterweight champion 26 June 2009 – 2 February 2013	Succeeded by Ruben Nieto
Vacant Title last held by Manuel Pérez	WBC Latino light-welterweight champion 29 July 2011 – September 2011; Vacated	Vacant Title next held by Antonio Pitalúa
