= Brunet Zamora =

Cuban born, Italian boxer (born 1974)

Medal record

Representing Italy

Men's Boxing

European Amateur Championships
| Bronze medal – third place | 2002 Perm | Light Welterweight |

Brunet Zamora Fernandez (born October 25, 1974, in Havana) is a Cuban born, Italian boxer. The resident of Trieste, Italy is competing in the Light Welterweight (– 64 kg) division, and won the bronze medal at the 2002 European Amateur Boxing Championships.

== Professional record ==
24 Wins (10 knockouts, 14 decisions), 1 losses, 2 Draws
| Res. | Record | Opponent | Type | Rd., Time | Date | Location | Notes |
| Win | 24–1-2 | (Poland) Krzysztof Szot | MD | 12 (12) | 2013-02-15 | PalaChiarbola, Trieste, Friuli-Venezia Giulia, Italy | For vacant EBU-EU Lightweight title. |
| Win | 23–1-2 | (Nicaragua) Michael Isaac Carrero | PTS | 6 (6) | 2012-12-01 | Palazzetto dello Sport, Rezzato, Lombardy, Italy | |
| Lost | 22–1-2 | (Russia) Denis Shafikov | TKO | 1 (12) | 2012-05-31 | Ufa Arena, Ufa, Russia | For vacant EBU Light Welterweight title. |
| Win | 22–0-2 | (Nicaragua) Santos Medrano | PTS | 8 (8) | 2012-04-06 | Fogliano Redipuglia, Friuli-Venezia Giulia, Italy | |
| Draw | 21–0-2 | (Panama) Alberto Mosquera | MD | 12 (12) | 2011-10-22 | Arena Roberto Duran, Panama City, Panama | Won vacant Interim WBA Light Welterweight title. |
| Win | 21–0-1 | (Argentina) Martin Antonio Coggi | TKO | 6 (12) | 2011-07-10 | Sequals, Friuli-Venezia Giulia, Italy | Retained WBA Inter-Continental Light Welterweight title. |
| Draw | 20–0-1 | (Russia) Denis Shafikov | MD | 12 (12), 1:24 | 2010-10-27 | Yubileiny Sports Palace, Saint Petersburg, Russia | Retained WBA Inter-Continental Light Welterweight title. |
| Win | 20–0 | (Argentina) Eduardo Daniel Roman | TKO | 1 (12) | 2010-05-21 | Palasport San Filippo, Brescia, Lombardy, Italy | Retained WBA Inter-Continental Light Welterweight title. |
| Win | 19–0 | (France) Christophe De Busillet | UD | 12 (12) | 2009-12-18 | Pala Bianchini, Latina, Lazio, Italy | Retained WBA Inter-Continental Light Welterweight title. |
| Win | 18-0 | (Hungary) Laszlo Komjathi | PTS | 6 (6) | 2009-07-18 | Parco giochi, Paratico, Lombardy, Italy | |
| Win | 17–0 | (Uganda) Peter Semo | TKO | 10 (12) | 2009-04-17 | PalaCarnera, Udine, Friuli-Venezia Giulia, Italy | Retained WBA Inter-Continental Light Welterweight title. |
| Win | 16–0 | (Brazil) Sidney Siqueira | KO | 5 (12) | 2008-09-18 | Autodromo, Adria, Rovigo, Veneto, Italy | Retained WBA Inter-Continental Light Welterweight title. |
| Win | 15–0 | (Slovenia) Andrzej Sark | UD | 12 (12) | 2008-05-16 | PalaChiarbola, Trieste, Friuli-Venezia Giulia, Italy | Won vacant WBA Inter-Continental Light Welterweight title. |
| Win | 14–0 | (Italy) Emanuele De Prophetis | TKO | 3 (10) | 2007-10-12 | Nuvolera, Brescia, Lombardy, Italy | Retained Italian Light Welterweight title |
| Win | 13–0 | (Italy) Alfredo Di Feto | UD | 10 (10) | 2007-07-10 | Pre-Saint-Didier, Aosta, Valle d'Aosta, Italy | Won vacant Italian Light Welterweight title |
| Win | 12–0 | (Hungary) Laszlo Bognar | TKO | 1 (6), 1:41 | 2007-03-02 | Nelson Mandela Forum, Florence, Tuscany, Italy | |
| Win | 11–0 | (Italy) Massimo Bertozzi | UD | 12 (12 | 2006-10-20 | Udine, Friuli-Venezia Giulia, Italy | Won vacant IBF International Light Welterweight title. |
| Win | 10–0 | (Czech Republic) Michal Durovic | PTS | 6 (6) | 2006-08-11 | Toscolano-Maderno, Lombardy, Italy | |
| Win | 9–0 | (Estonia) Albert Starikov | PTS | 8 (8) | 2006-05-12 | Rezzato, Lombardy, Italy | |
| Win | 8–0 | (Germany) Andreas Reimer | PTS | 6 (6) | 2006-02-10 | Palazzetto dello Sport, Chiarbola, Friuli-Venezia Giulia, Italy | |
| Win | 7–0 | (Russia) Viktor Baranov | PTS | 8 (8) | 2005-11-26 | Palazzetto dello Sport, Rome, Lazio, Italy | |
| Win | 6–0 | (Romania) Mircea Lurci | TKO | 2 | 2005-10-14 | Rivarolo Canavese, Piedmont, Italy | |
| Win | 5–0 | (United Kingdom) Peter McDonagh | PTS | 6 (6) | 2005-08-07 | PalaFlaminio, Rimini, Emilia Romagna, Italy | |
| Win | 4–0 | (Estonia) Albert Starikov | PTS | 6 (6) | 2005-07-16 | Stadio della Pallacorda, Rome, Lazio, Italy | |
| Win | 3–0 | (Belgium) Vadzim Astapuk | TKO | 5 (6) | 2005-05-13 | Palazzetto di Via Alberici, Piacenza, Emilia Romagna, Italy | |
| Win | 2–0 | (Romania) Claudiu Pop | TKO | 4 (6) | 2005-03-19 | Toscolano-Maderno, Lombardy, Italy | |
| Win | 1–0 | (Czech Republic) Pavel Nemecek | KO | 1 (6) | 2005-02-18 | Rovigo, Veneto, Italy | |
