= Craig Watson (boxer) =

English professional boxer (born 1983)

Personal information
- Nationality: English
- Born: 7 February 1983 (age 43) Oldham, England
- Height: 5 ft 8 in (173 cm)
- Weight: Light middleweight; Welterweight

Boxing career
- Stance: Southpaw

Boxing record
- Total fights: 27
- Wins: 22
- Win by KO: 9
- Losses: 5

Craig Watson (born 7 February 1983) is a British former professional boxer who competed from 2005 to 2013. He held the Commonwealth welterweight title from 2007 to 2009; the Commonwealth super welterweight title in 2010; and the British welterweight title in 2011.

== Amateur boxing career ==
Watson first gained TV exposure after taking on Amir Khan. Going into the bout as an unknown he was heavily written off by many as Khan was the Olympic silver medalist at the time however Watson managed to score a knock down and only lost on a close points defeat.

== Professional boxing career ==
=== Early professional career ===
Watson had his first professional contest in May 2005 when he scored a 2nd round TKO over Willie Valentine at the Elephant and Castle Centre in Southwark. He won his next six fights in a row before stepping up to fight fellow prospect John Fewkes (13–0) at the Leeds Town Hall. The fight gave Watson his first pro defeat as Fewkes scored a points victory over 8 rounds. Following that first loss Watson regrouped and scored wins over Robert Lloyd-Taylor (twice) and fellow prospect Michael Lomax. The victories set him up for a shot at the Commonwealth Welterweight title held by tough Namibian Ali Nuumbembe in a fight to be held on 8 December 2007 at the Robin Park Centre in Wigan.

=== Commonwealth welterweight champion ===
Watson produced the performance of his career so far in Wigan, beating Nuumbembe to win the Commonwealth title when the fight was stopped in the 8th round. An early clash of heads had caused a cut above Nuumbembe's left eye which eventually got so bad that the corner could not stem the flow of blood and so handed Watson victory. The newly crowned champion then travelled to Italy for his next fight to contest the vacant European Union belt against unbeaten Italian Daniele Petrucci. The fight on 8 March 2008 ended in bitter disappointment for Watson when the referee stopped it in the 3rd round with Watson saying that he was neither "mentally or physically prepared" for the fight having taken the match at short notice.

Redemption came only a few months later on 24 May 2008 when Watson found himself sharing a ring with Matthew Hatton at the City of Manchester Stadium. The fight for Watson's Commonwealth title was on the undercard to Ricky Hatton's fight with Juan Lazcano in what was widely dubbed as the Hitman's homecoming following his defeat to Floyd Mayweather in Las Vegas. Watson ended up winning the fight on points over 12 rounds prompting Hatton to say afterwards that Watson was the first man who had legitimately beaten him in the ring. On 11 April 2009 Watson lost the title in his second defence to John O'Donnell in a close fought contest at the York Hall to register the third defeat of his career. The contest shown live on ITV4 was described as scintillating as well as a 'classic bout' by observers sitting ringside.

=== Commonwealth light middleweight champion ===
Watson rebounded from the defeat to O'Donnell with a points win over journeyman Matt Scriven 21 August 2009 and a second round stoppage of Swiss boxer Riad Menasria on 27 November 2009. Prior to the fight with Menasria, Watson had said that he was looking to compete at light welterweight in the future and wanted to meet reigning British champion Lenny Daws. On 19 February 2010 in his first fight of the new year, Watson travelled to Stoke and stopped former British title challenger Barrie Jones in 4 rounds. His chance to regain a championship belt came just over one full year since his defeat to O'Donnell. Given just two days notice Watson stepped in to fight Ugandan boxer Badru Lusambya on 16 April 2010 for the light middleweight version of the Commonwealth belt. Despite having never fought at the higher weight before, Watson put his opponent down 4 times in the second round to win a convincing victory. Despite the victory and the title Watson chose to move back down to welterweight for his next contest on 16 July 2010 after deciding that light middleweight was perhaps not his ideal weight. His opponent, the Ghanaian journeyman Stephen Okine was stopped in the fifth round on the undercard of a bill that saw former victim Matthew Hatton retain his European title with a victory over his mandatory challenger Yuriy Nuzhnenko. On 6 November 2010 Watson moved back up to light middleweight at the Castle Leisure Center in Bury to register a win against Romanian journeyman Vasile Surcica, putting him down in the 8th round but failing to stop him inside the distance and scoring an 8 round points win.

=== British welterweight champion ===
Watson won the British title on 19 February 2011 with a revenge win against John O'Donnell, the man he had previously lost his old Commonwealth title to. Prior to the fight Watson referred to some of the pre-fight talk between the two fighters saying "He says he will shut me up, but it's all right saying that ... we'll see what happens in the ring". Watson said that following the close nature of the result against O'Donnell last time he had been consumed by bitterness and said that he was the victim of a home town decision as the fight took place in London, O'Donnells home. This time however there was to be no mistake. The return against O'Donnell once again took place in London, this time at the Wembley Arena, but the judges scored 116–113, 116–112 and 117–112 all to Watson over the 12 rounds. On 16 April 2011, in his first defence of the title, Watson lost to Lee Purdy. The fight, on the undercard of Amir Khan's contest with Paul McCloskey was stopped in the fifth round when Purdy caught Watson with a right hand to the jaw to win the British title. Watson attempted to retain the title on 16 July 2011 with a bout in his home town of Oldham but was once again stopped in the fifth as Purdy made a successful first defence.

== Professional Boxing record ==
27 fights	22 wins	5 losses
By knockout	9	3
By decision	13	2

Key to abbreviations used for results
DQ	Disqualification	RTD	Corner retirement
KO	Knockout	SD	Split decision / split draw
MD	Majority decision / majority draw	TD	Technical decision / technical draw
NC	No contest	TKO	Technical knockout
PTS	Points decision	UD	Unanimous decision / unanimous draw

Boxing record
No.	Result	Record	Opponent	Type	Round(s)	Time	Date	Location	Notes
27	Win	22–5	(United Kingdom) Mark Lloyd	RTD	4 (6)	3:00	8 Mar 2013	(United Kingdom) Bowlers Exhibition Centre, Manchester, Greater Manchester, UK	
26	Win	21–5	(Poland) Tomasz Mazurkiewicz	PTS	6	N/a	16 Jun 2012	(United Kingdom) Manchester Velodrome, Manchester, Greater Manchester, UK	
25	Loss	20–5	(United Kingdom) Lee Purdy	TKO	5 (12)	2:00	16 Jul 2011	(United Kingdom) Oldham Sports Centre, Oldham, Greater Manchester, UK	For British welterweight title
24	Loss	20–4	(United Kingdom) Lee Purdy	TKO	5 (12)	0:40	16 Apr 2011	(United Kingdom) Manchester Arena, Manchester, Greater Manchester, UK	Lost British welterweight title
23	Win	20–3	(Republic of Ireland) John O'Donnell	UD	12	N/a	19 Feb 2011	(United Kingdom) Wembley Arena, Wembley, London, UK	Won vacant British welterweight title
22	Win	19–3	(Romania) Vasile Surcica	PTS	8	N/a	6 Nov 2010	(United Kingdom) Castle Leisure Centre, Bury, Greater Manchester, UK	
21	Win	18–3	(Ghana) Stephen Okine	TKO	5 (8)	?	16 Jul 2010	(United Kingdom) Bolton Arena, Bolton, Greater Manchester, UK	
20	Win	17–3	(Uganda) Badru Lusambya	TKO	2 (12)	1:50	16 Apr 2010	(United Kingdom) Robin Park Centre, Wigan, Greater Manchester, UK	Won vacant Commonwealth light middleweight title
19	Win	16–3	(United Kingdom) Barrie Jones	TKO	4 (6)	1:53	19 Feb 2010	(United Kingdom) Fenton Manor Sports Complex, Stoke, Staffordshire, UK	
18	Win	15–3	(Switzerland) Riad Menasria	TKO	2 (6)	1:55	27 Nov 2009	(United Kingdom) Robin Park Centre, Wigan, Greater Manchester, UK	
17	Win	14–3	(United Kingdom) Matt Scriven	PTS	6	N/a	21 Aug 2009	(United Kingdom) Manchester Velodrome, Manchester, Greater Manchester, UK	
16	Lose	13–3	(Republic of Ireland) John O'Donnell	SD	12	N/a	11 Apr 2009	(United Kingdom) York Hall, Bethnal Green, Greater London, UK	Lost Commonwealth welterweight title
15	Win	13–2	(United Kingdom) Matthew Hatton	UD	12	N/a	24 May 2008	(United Kingdom) City of Manchester Stadium, Manchester, Greater Manchester, UK	Retained Commonwealth welterweight title
14	Loss	12–2	(Italy) Daniele Petrucci	TKO	3 (12)	?	8 Mar 2008	Tendastrisce, Rome, Italy	For vacant European welterweight title
13	Win	12–1	(Namibia) Paulus Ali Nuumbembe	TKO	8 (12)	0:24	8 Dec 2007	(United Kingdom) Robin Park Centre, Wigan, Greater Manchester, UK	Won Commonwealth welterweight title
12	Win	11–1	(France) Frederic Gosset	PTS	6	N/a	26 Oct 2007	(United Kingdom) Robin Park Centre, Wigan, Greater Manchester, UK	
11	Win	10–1	(United Kingdom) Robert Lloyd-Taylor	TKO	1 (6)	0:37	21 Sep 2007	(United Kingdom) York Hall, Bethnal Green, Greater London, UK	
10	Win	9–1	(United Kingdom) Michael Lomax	PTS	8	N/a	6 Jul 2007	(United Kingdom) Robin Park Centre, Wigan, Greater Manchester, UK	
9	Win	8–1	(United Kingdom) Robert Lloyd-Taylor	PTS	8	N/a	27 Apr 2007	(United Kingdom) Wembley Arena, Wembley, London, UK	
8	Loss	7–1	(United Kingdom) John Fewkes	PTS	8	N/a	9 Feb 2007	(United Kingdom) Town Hall, Leeds, Yorkshire, UK	
7	Win	7–0	(Ukraine) Rakhim Mingaleyev	PTS	6	N/a	25 Nov 2006	(United Kingdom) Holiday Inn, Belfast, Northern Ireland, UK	
6	Win	6–0	(Mauritius) Michael Medor	TKO	1 (4)	2:49	29 Sep 2006	(United Kingdom) George Carnall Leisure Centre, Davyhulme, UK	
5	Win	5–0	(Ukraine) Serhiy Tertyy	PTS	6	N/a	4 Nov 2005	(United Kingdom) York Hall, Bethnal Green, Greater London, UK	
4	Win	4–0	(United Kingdom) Ben Hudson	PTS	4	N/a	7 Nov 2005	(United Kingdom) York Hall, Bethnal Green, Greater London, UK	
3	Win	3–0	(United Kingdom) Billy Smith	PTS	4	N/a	16 Jul 2005	(United Kingdom) Bolton Arena, Bolton, Greater Manchester, UK	
2	Win	2–0	(Sri Lanka) Jus Wallie	PTS	4	N/a	19 Jun 2005	(United Kingdom) York Hall, Bethnal Green, Greater London, UK	
1	Win	1–0	(Republic of Ireland) Willie Valentine	RTD	2 (4)	3:00	19 Jun 2005	(United Kingdom) Elephant & Castle Centre, Southwark, London, UK	Professional debut

Preceded by Kell Brook vacated	British welterweight champion 19 February 2011 – 16 April 2011	Succeeded by Lee Purdy
Preceded by Anthony Small vacated	Commonwealth Light Middleweight Champion; 16 April 2010 –	Succeeded by incumbent
Preceded by Ali Nuumbembe	Commonwealth Welterweight Champion; 8 December 2007 – 11 April 2009	Succeeded by John O'Donnell
