= Kell Brook =

British boxer (born 1986)

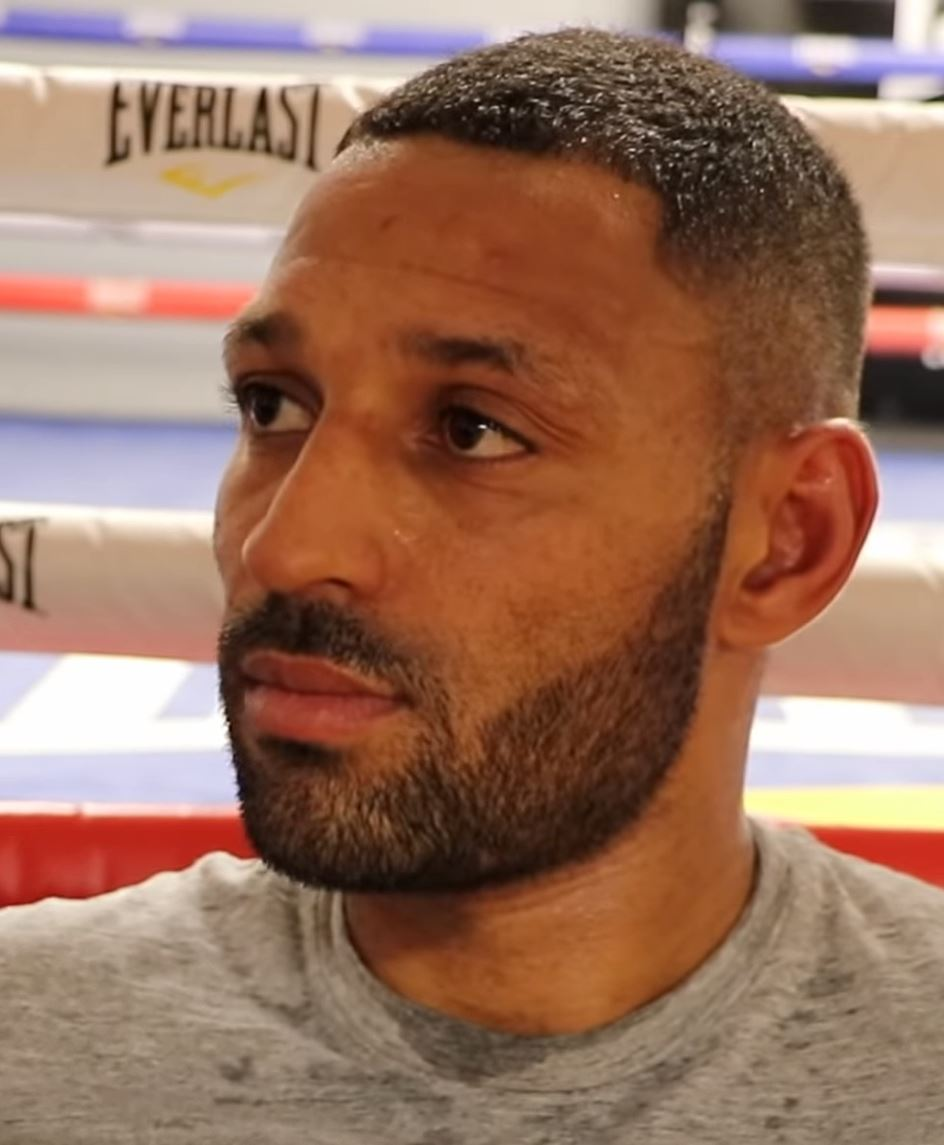
- Brook in 2020

Personal information
- Nicknames: The Special One; Special K
- Nationality: British
- Born: Ezekiel Brook; 3 May 1986 (age 40) Sheffield, South Yorkshire, England
- Height: 5 ft 9 in (175 cm)
- Weight: Welterweight; Light-middleweight; Middleweight

Boxing career
- Reach: 69 in (175 cm)
- Stance: Orthodox

Boxing record
- Total fights: 43
- Wins: 40
- Win by KO: 28
- Losses: 3

Ezekiel "Kell" Brook (born 3 May 1986) is a British former professional boxer who competed from 2004 to 2022. He held the International Boxing Federation (IBF) welterweight title from 2014 to 2017, and challenged once for a unified middleweight world title in 2016. At regional level, he held multiple welterweight titles, including the British welterweight title from 2008 to 2010. In May 2017, Brook was ranked as the world's best active welterweight by The Ring magazine.

== Amateur career ==
Brook had his first amateur fight at age 12 under the guidance of Brendan Ingle. At the end of his amateur career, he had won 31 of his 36 fights, winning two Amateur Boxing Association of England titles and two National Association of Boys Clubs British Boxing Championships and a gold medal in the 4 Nations. An early inspiration for Brook was Naseem Hamed, who was also trained by Ingle at the same Wincobank gym.

== Professional career ==
=== Welterweight ===
==== Early career ====
Brook's first fight as a professional took place in September 2004 with a 6-round points victory over experienced journeyman Peter Buckley at the Don Valley Stadium in Sheffield. He would fight again four more times that year to end 2004 with a record of 5–0 in just four months. Brook went about learning his trade against a host of journeymen before getting the opportunity in June 2008 to fight for the British welterweight title having compiled a winning record of 16–0.

==== Domestic and regional success ====
The championship fight at London's York Hall saw Kell Brook take on Welshman Barrie Jones for the vacant title. The fight was not without controversy however as the previous incumbent, Kevin McIntyre, had been stripped of the title after he sustained an injury and had to pull out of his scheduled defence against the Yorkshireman. Brook ended up winning the vacant title with a seventh-round technical knockout (TKO) of Jones who had come in at relatively short notice.

Having won the title Brook was then ordered to face the former champion and the bout took take place in Glasgow's Kelvin Hall on 14 November 2008. Prior to the fight and referring to the bad blood that has built up between the two fighter's Brook said, "Once I knock out McIntyre in style then there will be no question mark over who should be British champion." When the fight finally did happen, Brook put McIntyre down three times in the first round to win by TKO to send the Glasgow crowd home disappointed.

On 30 January 2009 Brook returned to the York Hall to meet former marine Stuart Elwell in a voluntary second defence. The fight again ended quickly when the referee stopped the fight in the second round, handing victory to Brook. He claimed the Lonsdale belt outright on 20 July 2009 when making his third defence against Prizefighter winner Michael Lomax. The fight, at the MEN Arena in Manchester, was on the undercard to Amir Khan's world championship victory over Andreas Kotelnik and saw Brook win by TKO in the third round. After the fight Brook said that he believed he was the best in Britain but couldn't say for sure until he's beaten Chorley's Michael Jennings who he challenged to a match-up.

On 25 September 2009, Brook pipped fellow champion Nathan Cleverly for the prestigious title of Young British Boxer of the Year award, as voted for by the Boxing Writer's Club. The vote was the closest in the history of the award with Brook claiming the honour by one vote over Cleverly who held both the British and Commonwealth light-heavyweight titles. In winning the award Brook joined a list of boxers which included the likes of Ken Buchanan, John H Stracey, Barry McGuigan, Nigel Benn, Naseem Hamed, Joe Calzaghe and Amir Khan.

Brook's first fight of 2010 took place in Liverpool on 12 March 2010. The fight, for the WBO Inter-Continental title, pitched Brook against Poland's Krzysztof Bienias, a man last beaten by Junior Witter in 2005 and with a run of seventeen straight wins. Brook collected his second career title when in the sixth round the fight was stopped by the referee following a dominant display by the Yorkshireman.

==== Brook vs. Jennings ====
Brook's long-awaited fight against Michael Jennings was due to be next on 3 July 2010 until a rib injury forced the fight to be postponed for a second time. The fight, for Brook's British title was then scheduled to take place between Jennings and former Commonwealth welterweight champion John O'Donnell before O'Donnell pulled out and was then rescheduled between Brook and Jennings. Finally, on 18 September 2010 Brook boxed Michael Jennings at the LG Arena in Birmingham. Brook defeated Jennings via fifth-round TKO after the latter sustained a cut, with the referee deeming the injury too severe for the bout to continue. The win doubled as Brooks's fourth defence of his British title and the first defence of his WBO regional title. On 11 December 2010 Brook made his second defence of his WBO Inter-Continental title, defeating Phillip Kotey via second-round TKO. The win ensured that Brook kept his number one ranking with the WBO.

On 8 April 2011 Brook split from promoter Frank Warren and joined the Matchroom Sport boxing stable under Eddie Hearn, with Brook saying that he was "really buzzing" to have joined the outfit. Hearn said that he was "excited about adding Kell to our stable". Speaking of Brook he said "Kell oozes class and has that something special about him – in short he is going to be a superstar." Brook's first contest for the promotional outfit was on 25 June 2011 at the Hillsborough Leisure Centre in Sheffield and resulted in a twelve-round unanimous decision (UD) victory against Lovemore N'dou, capturing the vacant WBA Inter-Continental title in the process.

==== Miscellaneous wins ====
On 17 March 2012, Kell Brook took his undefeated run to 27 fights by beating Matthew Hatton, brother of Ricky Hatton, by UD in Sheffield. The scores were 119–107, 119–108 and 118–109 all in favour of Brook. In front of nearly 10,000 fans at the Motorpoint Arena, Brook added the IBF International welterweight title to his WBA Inter-Continental title. Brook floored Hatton in the ninth round but could not knock out his Mancunian opponent. The fight gave record breaking viewing figures for Sky Sports' Fight Night Live programme as well as being the most watched fight of the year in Britain. Afterwards he said on the prospect of facing Khan: "Of course I want Khan, I've been banging on about Amir Khan, but I'm going to do my own thing and if that fight happens, it happens, and I'll smash him. I want to be fighting at that top table now with elite fighters. I think I've proved I deserve to be there."

Brook faced Carson Jones at the Motorpoint Arena in Sheffield on Saturday 7 July 2012. Eddie Hearn's Matchroom Sport promoted the fight with it being billed "Edge of Glory" as both fighters saw this fight as a stepping stone to a shot at a world title. The fight was shown live on Sky Sports 1. The weigh in took place in Sheffield's Winter Gardens on 6 July with Brook weighing in at 10 st 6 lb 10 oz (60.16 kg) and Jones weighing slightly less at 10 st 6 lb 6 oz (60.04 kg). Brook dominated the early rounds, moving well and connecting regularly with two and three punch combinations. However, as the fight went on he began to tire and Jones was able to land shots of his own. Brook's nose was broken in the eighth round. He was almost floored in the final round but was able to hold on until the bell. Brook did enough in the early rounds to win the fight by majority decision (MD), as the judges' scorecards read 114–114, 116–113, and 115–113 in Brook's favour. Brook was taken to hospital after the fight due to blood loss from his broken nose.

In August 2012 Matchroom Sport announced that Brook would face veteran Hector Saldivia at the Motorpoint Arena in Sheffield on 20 October 2012. The winner would then become the mandatory challenger for the IBF welterweight title held at the time by Randall Bailey. At a packed weigh-in the day before the fight at Sheffield's Meadowhall Centre, both fighters weighed in under the 147 lbs limit. Brook started strongly, knocking Saldivia down midway through the first round. The second round was very similar with Saldivia unable to deal with Brook's accuracy and power. In the third Brook landed a solid, well timed straight which sent the Argentinian to the floor again. This time he struggled to get up as his legs wobbled beneath him and the referee stopped the contest in the third round.

==== Brook vs. Alexander cancellation ====
After becoming the mandatory challenger, Brook was set to fight Devon Alexander for the world title on 19 January 2013 at the Nokia Theatre in Los Angeles, California. However, Brook announced he had sustained an ankle injury and the fight was pushed back until 23 February 2013 and the venue changed to the Masonic Temple in Detroit, Michigan. Then Alexander announced he had a bicep injury causing the fight to be rescheduled yet again to 18 May 2013 in Atlantic City, New Jersey. However, Brook would later pull out of the fight again after injuring his foot, scrapping the fight for a third time, with fellow Brit and Matchroom stablemate Lee Purdy taking his place and going on to lose via seventh-round corner retirement (RTD).

==== Brook vs. Jones II, Senchenko ====
After the saga with Devon Alexander Jr., Brook took a rematch with Carson Jones in Hull, England on 13 July 2013. Brook took the early rounds of this contest looking far too powerful and quick for the American. Brook went on to win by eighth-round TKO to take his record to 30–0.

It was announced shortly after the rematch with Jones that Brook would next face Vyacheslav Senchenko at the Motorpoint Arena in Sheffield on 26 October 2013. Senchenko had recently beaten Ricky Hatton, causing him to retire for good from boxing. Brook said he was using this as motivation and wanted to "get revenge" for a British boxing hero and a personal friend within the sport. Hatton was ringside for the fight and spoke to Brook in the dressing room just prior to the fight. The first and second rounds were very cagey encounters with neither fighter wanting to give too much away, with Brook using his jab more effectively and taking both the rounds. In the third Brook knocked his opponent down with a powerful right, forcing Senchenko to take the eight count before continuing. Brook started the fourth strongly by out-boxing his Ukrainian opponent, although Senchenko did unsteady Brook for a few seconds before Brook sent Sencheko back to the canvas with another right. Referee Shada Murdaugh concluded that Senchenko was in no position to continue and Brook was declared the winner by TKO.

==== Brook vs. Porter ====
After beating Senchenko, Brook was once again the mandatory challenger for the IBF welterweight title and faced newly crowned champion Shawn Porter on 16 August 2014 at the StubHub Center in Carson, California. Porter was the favorite to win and came out aggressively as he pressurised Brook, relying heavily on looping shots. Brook kept his composure, however, and showcased his defensive attributes, strength, and clean punching throughout the fight. Brook's technical ability took over after the middle rounds as the straight one-two combinations hurt Porter. Brook defeated Porter, capturing the title by an MD with scores 114–114, 116–112, and 117–111. Brook landed 158 of his 441 punches (36%), mostly jabs. Porter threw 308 more power punches, in total landing 156 of 626 thrown (25%). Porter felt as though he won the fight, "I thought that I was effective with my attack, but he was ready. I'm not giving any excuses. I want the rematch. I'll find him where he's at, and I'll take it from him." Brook claimed he wanted an all-British showdown with Amir Khan. The fight did not generate as many viewers as expected, an average of 661,000 viewers on Showtime. The whole card averaged just 514,000 viewers.

==== Brook vs. Dan, Gavin ====
Six months after sustaining a life-threatening injury, it was confirmed that Brook would finally make the first defence of his IBF title against mandatory challenger Jo Jo Dan (34–2, 18 KOs). The fight took place on 28 March 2015 in Brook's home town, Sheffield. Dan became the mandatory after beating Kevin Bizier in December 2014 via split decision (SD). Brook came out landing straight punches. In round two, a straight right hand wobbled Dan. Brook followed up with a right uppercut that sent Dan to the canvas. Soon after, Brook landed two straight right hands, the first wobbling Dan and the second creating another knockdown. In the fourth round, Brook threw a straight right and left hand that hurt Dan and followed up with a furry that resulted in the third knockdown. The final knockdown was scored at the bell with a counter left hand. Dan's corner subsequently stopped the fight in between rounds. The fight was broadcast live in the afternoon on Showtime in USA averaging 143,000 viewers and peaked at 166,000 viewers. A replay aired in the evening averaging 230,000 viewers, peaking 284,000 viewers.

On 10 April 2015, Matchroom Sport announced that Brook would be making his second defence in the space of two months against Frankie Gavin (22–2, 13 KOs) at the O2 Arena on 30 May on Sky Sport Box Office with a strong undercard including Lee Selby, Kevin Mitchell and Olympic gold medalist Anthony Joshua. The bout was known for being the first all-British welterweight world title fight. Brook successfully defended his IBF title for the second time. Brook landed his jab from the start and picked up the pace as the fight went on, cutting off the ring and walking through his opponent. Gavin remained defensive but did occasionally find success. In round six, Brook showed versatility in throwing a variety of combinations, mixing soft and hard punches, while Gavin attempted to avoid trading. As Brook landed an uppercut however, Gavin exchanged a right hand, which was countered by Brook's straight left hand. Gavin staggered back to the ropes, and the referee stopped the fight as Brook threw another flurry.

==== Brook vs. Bizier ====
On 2 September 2015, Hearn announced a deal had been reached for Brook to defend his title against Argentine slugger Diego Chaves (23–2–1, 19 KOs), after a deal could not be made with Brandon Rios. The fight was scheduled to take place at the Motorpoint Arena in Sheffield on 24 October, which would be Brook's third fight in seven months. Brook praised Chavez ahead of the fight, "Chaves is a rough, tough, durable fighter who is very dangerous. He's bringing something new to the table. He's coming off a draw to Tim Bradley, was ahead on the cards against Brandon Rios until he was disqualified and gave Keith Thurman a solid fight, so we know what level he has mixed at and how good he is." The fight was postponed and ultimately cancelled on 16 October after Brook injured his ribs during a sparring session. The rest of the card still took place as scheduled.

In January 2016, it was announced that after nearly a year without fighting, Brook would make a third defence of his IBF title against mandatory challenger Kevin Bizier (25–2, 17 KOs) at the Sheffield Arena on 26 March. Hearn and Bizier's promoter Yvon Michel agreed a deal to avoid purse bids. Bizier became the mandatory after knocking out Fredrick Lawson on 7 November 2015 in Miami, Florida. Brook stopped Bizier in the second round. En route to landing a 'big fight', Brook rocked Bizier with a left to the jaw and then further dazed him with a series of hooks. After taking a count, Bizier did not look that interested in carrying on and Brook unleashed a combination that left the Canadian crumpled in a heap. This was Brook's second mandatory fight since winning the IBF title in 2014. After the bout, Brook and Hearn talked about potential unification fights against the likes of Tim Bradley, Danny García, Keith Thurman and Jesse Vargas.

==== Jessie Vargas negotiations ====
It was announced on 12 May 2016 that negotiations for a unification fight with WBO titleholder Jessie Vargas (27–1, 10 KOs) were under way. Eddie Hearn told Sky Sports he had "offered a huge amount of money" to make the fight happen and while he conceded Brook might have to travel to America, Vargas insisted he was willing to cross the Atlantic. Danny García, the WBC champion, was top of the list, but Hearn conceded the Vargas fight looked more likely. Hearn said the fight will take place on 20 August, 27 August, or 3 September at Bramall Lane in Sheffield. Vargas confirmed via his Twitter account that the bout was set for 3 September. Negotiations fell through on 9 July for the unification title fight, when it was announced that Brook would be moving up two weight divisions to challenge Gennady Golovkin instead.

=== Middleweight ===
==== Brook vs. Golovkin ====
On 8 July 2016, it was announced that Brook would face undefeated, unified WBA (Super), WBC, IBF, and IBO middleweight champion Gennady Golovkin (35–0, 32 KOs). The fight took place on 10 September 2016 at the O2 Arena in London. There were negotiations for Golovkin to fight Chris Eubank Jr. However, negotiations fell through and Brook agreed to move up two weight divisions to challenge Golovkin. The fight aired in the US on HBO and on Sky Box Office pay-per-view in the UK.

On 5 September, the WBA withdrew its sanction for the fight. Although they granted Golovkin a special permit to take the fight, they stated that their title would not be at stake. The reason for the withdrawal was because Brook had never competed in the middleweight division. WBA president Gilberto Mendoza Jr. said, "What I most regret is that there are no boxers at 160 pounds who will fight against 'Triple G,' and Brook has to move up two divisions to fight against him." The Golovkin camp were said to be disappointed with the decision with promoter Tom Loeffler saying, "somehow the WBA thought it was too dangerous for a welterweight to move up to middleweight to fight the biggest puncher in boxing. I guess that is a compliment to GGG as they sanctioned [Adrien] Broner moving up two divisions [from lightweight to welterweight] to fight Paulie Malignaggi in 2013, and Roy Jones moving up two divisions [from light heavyweight to heavyweight] to fight John Ruiz [in 2003] for WBA titles, and Kell Brook is undefeated and considered a top pound-for-pound boxer."

On the night, Brook was staggered early in the first round, but kept his composure, growing stronger as the rounds unfolded. In the opening rounds, he was trading blows with Golovkin but suffered a damaged eye socket, and after heavy punishment in the fifth, trainer Dominic Ingle threw in the towel to hand Brook the first defeat of his professional career, losing by TKO. Despite this, Brook won many admirers for his spirited performance and stepping up two weight divisions to make the fight. Ingle confirmed Brook had gone through surgery successfully. According to CompuBox punch stats, Golovkin landed 133 of his 301 punches thrown (44.2%), while Brook landed 85 punches, having thrown 261 (32.6%). The fight was aired live on HBO in the afternoon and drew an average of 843,000 viewers and peaked at 907,000 viewers. This was considered to be a huge success for an afternoon showing. A replay was shown later in the evening as part of the world super flyweight title fight between Roman Gonzalez and Carlos Cuadras. The replay averaged 593,000 viewers.

=== Return to welterweight ===
==== Brook vs. Spence Jr. ====
In January 2017, Brook and his team were in talks with Amir Khan over a potential grudge fight, while also keeping the mandatory fight with Errol Spence Jr. as second choice. During negotiations, Khan urged Brook to fight Spence first and eventually talks broke down between Brook and Khan. Eddie Hearn mentioned talks were already ongoing with Spence's manager Al Haymon for a fight to take place possibly in the UK in May. Hearn received an extension from the IBF for negotiations between himself and TGB Promotions boss Tom Brown, as they were progressing. The purse bids for the fight were set for 7 February by the IBF. On 1 February, Hearn claimed that Brook would be keeping his title and making a defence against Spence and that he had reached out to Spence's team, to no reply. He assumed that they wanted the fight to go to purse bids. Spence said that he had no problem travelling to the UK for the fight, regardless of negotiations. With a deal close to being reached a day before the purse bids, the IBF granted a week extension, pushing the purse bid back 7 days. On 13 February a deal was reached for the fight to take place in Sheffield on 20 May 2017. At a press conference at Bramall Lane, Sheffield on 22 March, the fight was officially announced to take place on 27 May 2017 live on Sky Box Office in the UK and Showtime in the US.

In front of 27,000 fans in attendance, Brook lost his IBF welterweight title after being stopped in round eleven. In a fight where mostly power shots were landed, Spence threw combinations to the head and more to the body, wearing down Brook. Brook did well working the counter, and landed his own shots to the body, but Spence came back with his own shots. In round ten, Spence, having Brook against the ropes, unloaded some heavy power shots, which caused Brook to take a knee. In round eleven, before the fight was stopped, Brook motioned many times that he couldn't see through his left eye and voluntarily took a knee, again counting as a knockdown. The referee started the ten count which Brook couldn't make, giving him back to back defeats and his first as a welterweight. His trainer Dominic Ingle was also on the apron before the fight was officially stopped. At the time of stoppage, all three judges had Spence ahead on their scorecards with 97–92, 96–93, and 95–94. In the post-fight interview, Brook credited Spence, admitting he lost to the better boxer, "It was a very tough fight. I would say Spence is one of the best kids I’ve been in with, if not the best. I got caught in the seventh round, in the eye, and it felt like the same as in the Golovkin [fight]. Probably not as bad as that time, but I was getting hit on it over the rounds and it was getting worse. The last round, he caught me in it and I just stood there, double vision, and I couldn't see out of the eye [...] so I had to stop." Spence landed 246 of 633 punches thrown (39%) while Brook landed 136 of 442 (31%). For the fight, Spence earned around £1 million and Brook earned a guaranteed £3 million.

The fight was shown in the afternoon in the US on Showtime and averaged 291,000 viewers, peaking at 337,000 viewers. This was considered low numbers, even for an afternoon showing, possibly due to it being a holiday weekend. Brook spoke to Sky Sports the following day and confirmed that a CT scan showed he had broken his eye socket, meaning he would likely have surgery.

=== Light-middleweight ===
On 30 May 2017, Brook admitted he may have to move up to light-middleweight. Brook had successful surgery on his eye in June 2017 and said that he would start training again in the summer looking to make a ring return in late 2017. On 21 November, promoter Eddie Hearn announced that Brook would be moving up to light-middleweight in hopes of becoming a two-weight world champion. In an interview, Brook stated that he would return at light-middleweight for the sake of his health, however could still return to welterweight afterwards.

==== Brook vs. Rabchenko ====
Eddie Hearn, on 11 December 2017, announced that Brook would return to Sheffield at the FlyDSA Arena on 3 March 2018 against former European champion Sergey Rabchenko (29–2, 22 KOs) on Sky Sports. Rabchenko is known for fighting in the UK on some occasions, most notably defeating Brook's fellow gym buddy Ryan Rhodes in 2012. Rabchenko was ranked #5 by the WBC at the time. The WBC Silver light-middleweight title would be at stake for the fight. Brook weighed 153.4 pounds while Rabchenko weighed 153.7 pounds. Brook stopped Rabchenko in round two to claim the vacant WBC Silver title. In round one, Brook used his jab and right hand, with Rabchenko on the back foot leaving himself open. In round two, Brook hurt Rabchenko with a right uppercut. The shot wobbled Rabchenko, causing him to back up on unsteady legs. Brook then hit Rabchenko with a straight right hand to the head which put him down. Rabchenko slowly got to his feet at the count of nine, however clearly hurt, referee Steve Gray halted the fight at 1 minute 27 seconds of round two. In the post-fight interview, Brook said, "I've put everyone in the division on notice. It was all about getting timing right, and I was getting it right. Timing beats speed. I felt very comfortably. I've only gone up 10 pounds from yesterday. I needed to get back to winning ways. I'm back at it." Along with Hearn, Brook stated he would put pressure on rival Amir Khan for a future fight.

On 24 May, promoter Hearn confirmed Brook would return to the ring in July 2018. At the time, no specific date or venue was stated. It was also said that Brook would look to challenge for a world title after the bout in July, likely to be WBA and IBF light-middleweight champion Jarrett Hurd. Hearn made it known that he was interested in the Hurd fight. 28 July was the date set for Brook's return. On 13 June, it was announced that Brook would appear on the undercard of Dillian Whyte vs. Joseph Parker at The O2 Arena against Brandon Cook in a title eliminator. During the early days of July, there were rumours stating Brook had suffered an injury and would withdraw from the bout. On 14 July, Cook confirmed that the bout had been cancelled pending an official announcement from Hearn. It appeared Brook had injured his ankle and would be out of action until November 2018. On 19 July, Sam Eggington replaced Brook, keeping Cook on the card. Eggington suffered a cut in training a few days later and also withdrew from the bout. Hearn offered Cook a monetary compensation.

==== Brook vs. Zerafa ====
In early October 2018, it was reported that Brook and Khan had made some progress in their ongoing negotiations. With Brook stating that 147 pounds would not be an issue, Khan demanded they include a 10-pound rehydration limit, which meant neither boxer could weigh over 157 pounds on the morning of the fight. Brook rejected the idea and insisted they fight at catchweight. On 19 October, according to The Sheffield Star, Brook had split with longtime trainer Dominic Ingle. The same reports stated Brook would train with longtime friend John Fewkes. Ingle denied rumours that he and Brook had a falling out. Fewkes stated it was the first he had heard of the news. On 27 October, Brook told Sky Sports that he would be returning to the ring at the FlyDSA Arena in Sheffield on 8 December 2018. Although an opponent was not named, it was speculated it would be Michael Zerafa, as Zerafa later spoke out confirming he would cause on upset and then challenge Khan himself. Brook was ranked #2 by the WBA and WBC, #4 by the WBO and #5 by the IBF while Zerafa was ranked #8 by the WBA at super welterweight. On 29 October, Brook denied he had split with Ingle, however confirmed that because Ingle was in Canada training other fighters, he would keep his camp in Fuerteventura, therefore Ingle would not be in his corner for the fight. On 5 November, Zerafa (25–2, 14 KOs) was confirmed as Brook's opponent. Showing that he could easily make the 147 limit, Brook weighed in 150 pounds, compared to Zerafa, who weighed 153 pounds. It was said the bout would be a final eliminator for Jarrett Hurd's WBA title.

In front of his hometown crowd, Brook put on a below-par performance to defeat Zerafa via twelve-round UD to become the WBA mandatory challenger. The three judges scored the fight comfortably in Brook's favour with 119–109, 118–110, and 117–111. Brook started the fight quick, landing shots on Zerafa in the opening couple of rounds. He started to then slow down his workrate and by the midway point, his punch output began to drop. Brook, although landed plenty himself, allowed himself to be hit more than usual. It was the first time Brook went the twelve round distance since 2014 when he won the IBF title against Porter. After the fight, Brook admitted he was not at his best and also stated his performance might tempt a lot of boxers to now get in the ring with him. Hearn also voiced his opinion, stating Amir Khan should take the fight next. Brook's new trainer John Fewkes stated the performance was not his best as he 'tried too hard', but also raised the positive point that it should now entice other boxers to fight him.

In the post-fight press conference, Brook accepted Khan's rehydration request that he would weigh no more than 157 pounds on fight night. A few days later, Hearn made it public that he had offered Khan an £8m flat fee, plus an upside of the revenue to fight Brook. The offer was made a week after Top Rank offered Khan a flat fee of £3.9m to face WBO welterweight champion Terence Crawford.

==== Brook vs. DeLuca ====
After a layoff of 14 months, Brook returned to the ring on 8 February 2020 to face Mark DeLuca for the vacant WBO Inter-Continental light-middleweight title. Brook was ranked #10 by the WBC while DeLuca was ranked #7 by the WBA at super welterweight. Brook marked his return to boxing with a decisive victory over DeLuca, securing a knockout in the seventh round. Brook showcased his dominance throughout the match, knocking DeLuca down in the third round before delivering a powerful left hook that concluded the fight. Brook expressed a sense of urgency, stating that this is his last chance and that he aims to make 2020 his year, reflecting on the challenges he has faced since 2016.

=== Return to welterweight ===
==== Brook vs. Crawford, Khan ====
On 14 November 2020, Brook moved back down to the welterweight division and attempted to become a two-time welterweight champion when he faced undefeated Terence Crawford in Paradise, Nevada for his WBO world title. In the fourth round, Crawford caught Brook with a stiff, hard right jab, and the referee administered a standing count to the latter. The fight continued, but Crawford quickly landed a flurry of shots which prompted the referee to step in and halt the contest, making Crawford the winner by fourth-round technical knockout.

On 29 November 2021, It was announced that Brook would face long time rival Amir Khan on February, 19th 2022 at the AO Arena in Manchester, England in a 149 catchweight bout. Brook won the fight by TKO in the sixth round. He started strong, using his jab effectively and landing clean shots. Khan had moments of success early on, but Brook's power and precision began to take over as the fight progressed. In the sixth round, Brook landed a series of punches that prompted the referee to stop the fight, giving Brook the victory.

=== Retirement ===
Brook announced his retirement from boxing in May 2022.

=== Comeback in 2026 ===
In 2025, former trainer Dominic Ingle told Boxing King Media that Brook had been approached and offered a sum of money to fight for Bare-Knuckle Fighting Championship. In January 2026, Brook said there was no truth in these rumours.

On 20 October 2025, Brook announced that he would make his ring return in honour of Ricky Hatton. The fight was scheduled to take place on 13 February 2026 at The Agenda in Dubai Media City, against Eisa Al Dah. Al Dah was originally scheduled to be Hatton's comeback opponent in December 2025. The event will celebrate Hatton's legacy and support the newly established Ricky Hatton Foundation. The undercard was to feature UAE residents versus Manchester fighters.

In August 2026, Brook announced that he intended to return after being retired for more than four years. He stated that a comeback bout was nearly finalized and expected to occur later in the year at either middleweight or super middleweight. Speaking to talkSPORT, he said, 'I'm coming back' and promised that 'some massive news' would soon be announced.

== Personal life ==
Brook has been involved in two stabbing incidents, the first in Sheffield in 2007. Secondly, on 4 September 2014, while on holiday with his pregnant wife in Tenerife, Brook was stabbed in the leg, in what he said was an unprovoked attack. The incident took place around 2 a.m. local time at Golf del Sur in San Miguel de Abona. A spokeswoman stated that he had lost a lot of blood. There were no immediate arrests. It was later reported that Brook had been stabbed three times in the leg and once in the arm. Brook spoke about the attack while in hospital, "I was out enjoying a night out before returning home to the UK when I was the victim of an unprovoked attack. I’m devastated right now after being on such a high having achieved my dream of becoming world champion in Los Angeles last month. This is obviously a major setback. I want to thank everyone for their support and ask for privacy for myself and my family at this time. Make no mistake – I will be back."

Brook is in a relationship with fellow former world champion boxer Ebanie Bridges and she gave birth to their first child Ezerra Ray Brook on 20 February 2025. They live together in Dore.

== Professional boxing record ==
43 fights	40 wins	3 losses
By knockout	28	3
By decision	12	0

No.	Result	Record	Opponent	Type	Round, time	Date	Location	Notes
43	Win	40–3	Amir Khan	TKO	6 (12), 0:51	19 Feb 2022	AO Arena, Manchester, England	
42	Loss	39–3	Terence Crawford	TKO	4 (12), 1:14	14 Nov 2020	MGM Grand Conference Center, Paradise, Nevada, US	For WBO welterweight title
41	Win	39–2	Mark DeLuca	KO	7 (12), 1:15	8 Feb 2020	Sheffield Arena, Sheffield, England	Won vacant WBO Inter-Continental light-middleweight title
40	Win	38–2	Michael Zerafa	UD	12	8 Dec 2018	Sheffield Arena, Sheffield, England	
39	Win	37–2	Sergey Rabchenko	KO	2 (12), 1:27	3 Mar 2018	Sheffield Arena, Sheffield, England	Won vacant WBC Silver light-middleweight title
38	Loss	36–2	Errol Spence Jr.	KO	11 (12), 1:47	27 May 2017	Bramall Lane, Sheffield, England	Lost IBF welterweight title
37	Loss	36–1	Gennady Golovkin	TKO	5 (12), 1:52	10 Sep 2016	The O2 Arena, London, England	For WBC, IBF, and IBO middleweight titles
36	Win	36–0	Kevin Bizier	TKO	2 (12), 2:15	26 Mar 2016	Sheffield Arena, Sheffield, England	Retained IBF welterweight title
35	Win	35–0	Frankie Gavin	TKO	6 (12), 2:51	30 May 2015	The O2 Arena, London, England	Retained IBF welterweight title
34	Win	34–0	Jo Jo Dan	RTD	4 (12), 3:00	28 Mar 2015	Motorpoint Arena, Sheffield, England	Retained IBF welterweight title
33	Win	33–0	Shawn Porter	MD	12	16 Aug 2014	StubHub Center, Carson, California, US	Won IBF welterweight title
32	Win	32–0	Álvaro Robles	TKO	8 (10), 1:35	15 Mar 2014	Echo Arena, Liverpool, England	
31	Win	31–0	Vyacheslav Senchenko	TKO	4 (12), 2:57	26 Oct 2013	Motorpoint Arena, Sheffield, England	
30	Win	30–0	Carson Jones	TKO	8 (10), 1:07	13 Jul 2013	Craven Park, Hull, England	
29	Win	29–0	Hector Saldivia	TKO	3 (12), 0:28	20 Oct 2012	Motorpoint Arena, Sheffield, England	
28	Win	28–0	Carson Jones	MD	12	7 Jul 2012	Motorpoint Arena, Sheffield, England	Retained IBF International welterweight title
27	Win	27–0	Matthew Hatton	UD	12	17 Mar 2012	Motorpoint Arena, Sheffield, England	Retained WBA Inter-Continental welterweight title; Won IBF International welterweight title
26	Win	26–0	Luis Galarza	TKO	5 (10), 1:38	17 Dec 2011	Boardwalk Hall, Atlantic City, New Jersey, US	
25	Win	25–0	Rafał Jackiewicz	TKO	6 (12), 2:36	8 Oct 2011	Ponds Forge, Sheffield, England	Retained WBA Inter-Continental welterweight title
24	Win	24–0	Lovemore N'dou	UD	12	25 Jun 2011	Hillsborough Leisure Centre, Sheffield, England	Won vacant WBA Inter-Continental welterweight title
23	Win	23–0	Philip Kotey	TKO	2 (12), 0:39	11 Dec 2010	Echo Arena, Liverpool, England	Retained WBO Inter-Continental welterweight title
22	Win	22–0	Michael Jennings	TKO	5 (12), 0:47	18 Sep 2010	LG Arena, Birmingham, England	Retained British and WBO Inter-Continental welterweight titles
21	Win	21–0	Krzysztof Bienias	TKO	6 (12), 2:46	12 Mar 2010	Echo Arena, Liverpool, England	Won WBO Inter-Continental welterweight title
20	Win	20–0	Michael Lomax	TKO	3 (12), 2:41	18 Jul 2009	MEN Arena, Manchester, England	Retained British welterweight title
19	Win	19–0	Stuart Elwell	TKO	2 (12), 1:29	30 Jan 2009	York Hall, London, England	Retained British welterweight title
18	Win	18–0	Kevin McIntyre	TKO	1 (12), 2:00	14 Nov 2008	Kelvin Hall, Glasgow, Scotland	Retained British welterweight title
17	Win	17–0	Barrie Jones	TKO	7 (12), 0:42	14 Jun 2008	York Hall, London, England	Won vacant British welterweight title
16	Win	16–0	Darren Gethin	RTD	3 (6), 3:00	22 Mar 2008	International Arena, Cardiff, Wales	
15	Win	15–0	Aleksei Stoda	PTS	6	6 Oct 2007	Nottingham Arena, Nottingham, England	
14	Win	14–0	Karl David	TKO	3 (8), 2:58	7 Apr 2007	Millennium Stadium, Cardiff, Wales	
13	Win	13–0	David Kirk	TKO	1 (6), 2:30	9 Dec 2006	ExCeL, London, England	
12	Win	12–0	Duncan Cottier	TKO	3 (6), 0:45	14 Oct 2006	MEN Arena, Manchester, England	
11	Win	11–0	Geraint Harvey	TKO	3 (6), 1:52	1 Jun 2006	Metrodome, Barnsley, England	
10	Win	10–0	Ernie Smith	PTS	6	29 Apr 2006	Meadowbank Stadium, Edinburgh, Scotland	
9	Win	9–0	Ernie Smith	PTS	4	10 Sep 2005	International Arena, Cardiff, Wales	
8	Win	8–0	Jonathan Whiteman	TKO	2 (4), 2:26	9 Jul 2005	National Ice Centre, Nottingham, England	
7	Win	7–0	Ernie Smith	PTS	6	15 May 2005	Octagon Centre, Sheffield, England	
6	Win	6–0	Lee Handley	PTS	6	4 Mar 2005	Magna Science Adventure Centre, Rotherham, England	
5	Win	5–0	Karl Taylor	PTS	6	19 Dec 2004	Reebok Stadium, Bolton, England	
4	Win	4–0	Brian Coleman	TKO	1 (4), 1:08	10 Dec 2004	Hillsborough Leisure Centre, Sheffield, England	
3	Win	3–0	Leeroy Williamson	TKO	2 (6), 0:35	9 Nov 2004	Elland Road Banqueting Suite, Leeds, England	
2	Win	2–0	Andy Cosnett	TKO	1 (6), 1:01	29 Oct 2004	Hotel Van Dyk, Clowne, England	
1	Win	1–0	Peter Buckley	PTS	6	17 Sep 2004	Don Valley Stadium, Sheffield, England	

== Pay-per-view bouts ==
United Kingdom
No.	Date	Fight	Network	Buys	Source(s)
1	18 September 2010	Kell Brook vs. Michael Jennings	Sky Box Office	15,000	
2	30 May 2015	Kell Brook vs. Frankie Gavin	Sky Box Office	139,000	
3	10 September 2016	Gennady Golovkin vs. Kell Brook	Sky Box Office	752,000	
4	27 May 2017	Kell Brook vs. Errol Spence Jr	Sky Box Office	405,000	
5	19 February 2022	Amir Khan vs. Kell Brook	Sky Box Office	600,000	
Total sales				1,911,000	

Sporting positions
Regional boxing titles
Vacant Title last held by Kevin McIntyre	British welterweight champion 14 June 2008 – 18 September 2010; Vacated	Vacant Title next held by Sam Eggington
Preceded by Krzysztof Bienias	WBO Inter-Continental welterweight champion 12 March 2010 – May 2011; Vacated	Vacant Title next held by Frankie Gavin
Vacant Title last held by Leonard Bundu	WBA Inter-Continental welterweight champion 25 June 2011 – July 2012; Vacated	Vacant Title next held by Marcos Maidana
Preceded by Matthew Hatton	IBF International welterweight champion 17 March 2012 – September 2012; Vacated	Vacant Title next held by Lee Purdy
Vacant Title last held by Sergio Garcia	WBC Silver light middleweight champion 3 March 2018 – 9 December 2018	Vacant Title next held by Liam Smith
Vacant Title last held by Brian Castaño	WBO Inter-Continental light middleweight champion 2 February 2020 – December 2020; Vacated	Vacant Title next held by Balázs Bacskai
World boxing titles
Preceded by Shawn Porter	IBF welterweight champion 16 August 2014 – 27 May 2017	Succeeded by Errol Spence Jr.
