= Álvaro Robles =

Álvaro Robles may refer to:

- Álvaro Robles (boxer) (born 1986), Mexican boxer
- Álvaro Robles (table tennis), Spanish table tennis player
