= Lee Purdy =

British former professional boxer (born 1987)

Personal information
- Nickname: Lights Out
- Nationality: British
- Born: 29 May 1987 (age 39) Colchester, Essex, England
- Height: 5 ft 7 in (170 cm)
- Weight: Light welterweight; Welterweight

Boxing career
- Stance: Orthodox

Boxing record
- Total fights: 26
- Wins: 20
- Win by KO: 13
- Losses: 5
- Draws: 1

Lee Purdy (born 29 May 1987) is a British former professional boxer who competed from 2006 to 2013. He held the British welterweight title in 2011, challenged once for the vacant Commonwealth welterweight title in 2010 and once for the EBU European welterweight title in 2013.

== Professional boxing career ==
=== British Champion ===
Purdy claimed the British title with a win over Craig Watson via 5th round stoppage to become Colchesters first British boxing champion at the MEN Arena in Manchester on 16 April 2011. This victory was followed up in his first defence on 16 July 2011 with another victory over Watson, this time in Oldham and with another stoppage in the 5th round. Despite starting brightly, Watson began to be worn down in the third round as two heavy shots from Purdy landed. Eventually after Watson was knocked down twice in the 5th, the referee called a halt to the contest. Purdy lost the title in his second defence against former British light welterweight champion Colin Lynes. Purdy lost a majority points decision to Lynes after getting up off the canvas in the 10th to produce a strong finish.

On 18 May 2013, Lee Purdy fought Devon Alexander at Boardwalk Hall, Atlantic City, NJ. The bout was originally scheduled for the IBF welterweight title but Purdy failed to make the weight. Purdy took the fight at 4 weeks notice after Kell Brook pulled out with a hand injury. The fight was controversially stopped by Purdys trainer (Darren Barker) in the 7th round, although Purdy was not hurt at any stage throughout the fight and was looking to come on strong in the later rounds.

== Alleged money laundering offence ==
In August 2013 Purdy was charged with money laundering along with five other people in what was believed to be a £1 million scam against elderly people. He was due to appear at Colchester Magistrates Court in September 2013. Purdy, as well as the other accused, denied the charges. Lee Purdy was found not guilty by unanimous verdict (jury) of money laundering. He thanked everyone who had supported him via Twitter.

After several operations on a detached retina suffered during the Leonard Bundu fight in December 2013, Purdy is expected to return to the ring in 2015 and would possibly meet the winner of the Frankie Gavin and Bradley Skeete bout for the British title.

== Retirement ==
After sustaining a severed and detached retina in a fight with European welterweight champion Leonard Bundu in late 2013, Purdy was forced to retire from the sport of boxing. His promoter Eddie Hearn confirmed the retirement in an interview with iFLTV on 16 February 2015.

== Professional boxing record ==
26 fights	20 wins	5 losses
By knockout	13	2
By decision	7	3
Draws	1	

No	Result	Record	Opponent	Type	Round, time	Date	Location	Notes
26	Loss	20–5–1	(Italy) Leonard Bundu	TKO	12 (12), 2:53	14 Dec 2013	(United Kingdom) ExCel Arena, London Docklands, England	For EBU European welterweight title
25	Loss	20–4–1	(United States) Devon Alexander	RTD	7 (12), 3:00	18 May 2013	(United States) Boardwalk Hall, Atlantic City, New Jersey, U.S.	
24	Win	20–3–1	(Mexico) Cosme Rivera	TKO	9 (12), 0:56	9 Mar 2013	(United Kingdom) Wembley Arena, Wembley, London, England	Retained IBF International welterweight title
23	Win	19–3–1	(Argentina) Gumersindo Lucas Carrasco	TKO	4 (12), 1:43	8 Sep 2012	(United Kingdom) Alexandra Palace, Muswell Hill, London, England	Won vacant IBF International welterweight title
22	Win	18–3–1	(United Kingdom) Chris Johnson	TKO	1 (10), 2:18	7 Jul 2012	(United Kingdom) Sheffield Arena, Sheffield, England	
21	Win	17–3–1	(United Kingdom) Adnan Amar	TKO	5 (10), 3:00	17 Mar 2012	(United Kingdom) Sheffield Arena, Sheffield, England	
20	Loss	16–3–1	(United Kingdom) Colin Lynes	MD	12	9 Nov 2011	(United Kingdom) York Hall, Bethnal Green, London, England	
19	Win	15–3–1	(United Kingdom) Craig Watson	TKO	5 (12), 2:00	16 Jul 2011	(United Kingdom) Oldham Sports Centre, Manchester, England	Retained British welterweight title
18	Win	14–3–1	(United Kingdom) Craig Watson	TKO	5 (12), 0:40	16 Apr 2011	(United Kingdom) M.E.N. Arena, Manchester, England	Won British welterweight title
17	Win	14–2–1	(Ghana) Theophilus Tetteh	PTS	8	10 Sep 2010	(United Kingdom) York Hall, Bethnal Green, London, England	
16	Loss	13–2–1	(United Kingdom) Denton Vassell	UD	12	16 Apr 2010	(United Kingdom) Robin Park Centre, Wigan, England	For vacant Commonwealth welterweight title
15	Win	13–1–1	(United Kingdom) Mark Douglas	TKO	4 (10), 0:40	28 Nov 2009	(United Kingdom) Brentwood Centre, Brentwood, Essex, England	Retained British Southern Area welterweight title
14	Win	12–1–1	(Republic of Ireland) Peter McDonagh	PTS	10	5 Sep 2009	(United Kingdom) Colosseum, Watford, England	Won vacant British Southern Area welterweight title
13	Win	11–1–1	(United Kingdom) Kevin McCauley	TKO	2 (4), 1:29	18 Jul 2009	(United Kingdom) York Hall, Bethnal Green, London, England	
12	Win	10–1–1	(United Kingdom) Leonard Lothian	PTS	4	28 Feb 2009	(United Kingdom) Norwich Showground, Norwich, England	
11	Loss	9–1–1	(Republic of Ireland) Peter McDonagh	PTS	10	13 Dec 2008	(United Kingdom) Brentwood Centre, Brentwood, Essex, England	For British Southern Area super lightweight title
10	Win	9–0–1	(United Kingdom) Adam Kelly	TKO	5 (6), 2:42	8 Nov 2008	(United Kingdom) York Hall, Bethnal Green, London, England	
9	Win	8–0–1	(United Kingdom) Johnny Greaves	TKO	3 (6), 2:32	4 Oct 2008	(United Kingdom) Norwich Showground, Norwich, England	
8	Draw	7–0–1	(Kenya) Geoffrey Munika	PTS	6	27 Jun 2008	(United Kingdom) York Hall, Bethnal Green, London, England	
7	Win	7–0	(United Kingdom) Jamie Spence	TKO	1 (6), 2:11	4 Apr 2008	(United Kingdom) York Hall, Bethnal Green, London, England	
6	Win	6–0	(United Kingdom) Craig Dyer	TKO	1 (4), 1:47	25 Jan 2008	(United Kingdom) Goresbrook Leisure Centre, Dagenham, England	
5	Win	5–0	(United Kingdom) Johnny Greaves	PTS	6	25 Nov 2007	(United Kingdom) Hippodrome Nightclub, Colchester, Essex, England	
4	Win	4–0	(United Kingdom) Ben Hudson	PTS	6	1 Jul 2007	(United Kingdom) Hippodrome Nightclub, Colchester, Essex, England	
3	Win	3–0	(United Kingdom) Duncan Cottier	PTS	4	16 Jun 2007	(United Kingdom) Prince Regent Hotel, Chigwell, Essex, England	
2	Win	2–0	(United Kingdom) Kristian Laight	PTS	4	16 Mar 2007	(United Kingdom) Norwich Showground, Norwich, England	
1	Win	1–0	(Latvia) Deniss Sirjatovs	TKO	3 (4), 2:10	8 Dec 2006	(United Kingdom) Goresbrook Leisure Centre, Dagenham, England	
