= John O'Donnell (boxer) =

Irish boxer

Personal information
- Nationality: Irish
- Born: John O'Donnell; 13 November 1985 (age 40) London, United Kingdom
- Weight: Welterweight

Boxing career
- Stance: Southpaw

Boxing record
- Total fights: 36
- Wins: 33
- Win by KO: 11
- Losses: 3
- Draws: 0

John O'Donnell (born 13 November 1985) is a London-based Irish Traveller professional boxer who is a former holder of the Commonwealth welterweight championship.

== Professional boxing career ==
=== Early professional career ===
O'Donnell, had his first professional in April 2004 with a win over journeyman Jason Nesbitt at the Penningtons Nightclub in Bradford. Over the next three years he would fight 13 more times without defeat against a series of journeymen opponents before earning the right to fight for the English title in May 2007. His opponent for the vacant English belt was fellow unbeaten prospect Stuart Elwell. The fight ended with a 10-round points victory for O'Donnell. Following his win over Elwell, O'Donnell next travelled to Las Vegas in May 2007 to fight Mexican Christian Solano on the undercard of Floyd Mayweather's fight with Oscar De La Hoya. The bout ended with disappointment for the 15-0 prospect after the fight was stopped in the 2nd round giving victory to the Mexican. Such was the devastating nature of the defeat, O'Donnell took a year off from boxing and only returned in May 2008 with a win over journeyman Billy Smith. Four more victories followed in 2008 before being given the chance to fight for the Commonwealth title in 2009.

=== Commonwealth champion ===
O'Donnell's shot at a first major title came on 11 April 2009. In the opposite corner, the champion Craig Watson, had himself claimed the title with a win over Namibian Ali Nuumbembe and made one defence against Matthew Hatton, the brother of Ricky. It was a step up in class for O'Donnell and he signaled his entry into the top tier of domestic boxing with victory over Watson via a split decision in what was described as a close and scintillating contest. O'Donnell had been due to make the first defence of his newly won title on 5 September 2009 but due to problems making the weight had to settle for a non-title contest over 12 rounds against Tom Glover. The fight, shown live on ITV4, was too much of a step-up for Glover who was stopped in the 6th round with O'Donnell having taken full control. O'Donnell gave up the belt after coming under pressure from the Commonwealth council after a mandatory defence scheduled for 5 March 2010 against the Ghanaian boxer Philip Kotey fell through. On 7 May 2010 he stepped back into the ring to defeat Hungarian boxer Laszlo Balogh in the 5th round of an 8-round contest stating after the fight that he would like to meet Paul McCloskey in an all Irish contest for the European title. On 10 September 2010 O'Donnell fought the American former Olympic bronze medal winner Terrance Cauthen in an international contest at the York Hall. Winning the fight over 12 rounds O'Donnell claimed that Cauthen was the best boxer he had ever faced and that the reason why he gave up his Commonwealth belt was "because my team did not want that belt to hold me back, so I could go onto the next level".

=== British title challenge ===
On 19 February 2011 O'Donnell met former victim Craig Watson at the Wembley Arena to challenge for the vacant British title only for Watson to gain revenge by winning over 12 rounds.

== Professional record ==
32 Wins (11 knockouts, 21 decisions), 2 Losses (1 knockout, 1 decision)
Res.	Record	Opponent	Type	Rd., Time	Date	Location	Notes
Win	32-2	(England) Erick Ochieng	SD	10	2017-03-18	York Hall, Bethnal Green, England	Won vacant Commonwealth English Welterweight title.
Win	31-2	(England) Tommy Tear	PTS	10	2016-10-01	York Hall, Bethnal Green, England	Won vacant Commonwealth Southern Area Welterweight title.
Win	30-2	(Czech Republic) Jan Balog	PTS	6	2015-12-05	York Hall, Bethnal Green, England	
Win	29-2	(Hungary) Laszlo Fazekas	PTS	8	2015-05-02	Lavey Centre, Derry, Northern Ireland	
Win	28-2	(England) Jay Morris	PTS	4	2013-07-06	York Hall, Bethnal Green, England	
Win	27-2	(Northern Ireland) Stephen Haughian	PTS	8	2012-12-01	Odyssey Arena, Belfast, Northern Ireland	
Win	26-2	(Dominican Republic) Thomas Mendez	UD	8	2012-10-12	Bell Centre, Montreal, Quebec, Canada	
Win	25-2	(England) Martin Welsh	PTS	8	2012-04-14	Odyssey Arena, Belfast, Northern Ireland	
Loss	24-2	(England) Craig Watson	UD	12	2011-02-19	Wembley Arena, Wembley, England	For vacant Commonwealth British Welterweight title.
Win	24-1	(United States) Terrance Cauthen	PTS	12	2010-09-10	York Hall, Bethnal Green, England	
Win	23-1	(Hungary) Laszlo Robert Balogh	TKO	5 (8), 2:56	2010-05-07	Kingsway Leisure Centre, Widnes, England	
Win	22-1	(England) Tom Glover	TKO	6 (12), 2:43	2009-09-05	Colosseum, Watford, England	
Win	21-1	(England) Craig Watson	SD	12	2009-04-11	York Hall, Bethnal Green, England	Won Commonwealth (British Empire) Welterweight title.
Win	20-1	(Germany) Suleyman Dag	TKO	3 (6), 1:03	2008-11-15	(Republic of Ireland) Breaffy House Resort, Castlebar, Ireland	
Win	19-1	(Latvia) Sergejs Sayrinovics	RTD	3 (8), 3:00	2008-10-04	Norwich Showground, Norwich, England	
Win	18-1	(Latvia) Sergejs Volodins	TKO	5 (6)	2008-07-19	(Republic of Ireland) University Arena, Limerick, Ireland	
Win	17-1	(England) Jay Morris	TKO	6 (6), 2:44	2008-06-27	York Hall, Bethnal Green, England	
Win	16-1	(England) Billy Smith	PTS	4	2008-05-10	Nottingham Arena, Nottingham, England	
Loss	15-1	(Mexico) Christian Solano	TKO	2 (8), 1:50	2007-05-05	MGM Grand Garden Arena, Las Vegas, Nevada, United States	
Win	15-0	(England) Stuart Elwell	PTS	10	2007-03-23	Nottingham Arena, Nottingham, England	Won vacant BBBofC English Welterweight title.
Win	14-0	(England) Ernie Smith	KO	2 (8), 2:20	2006-12-08	Goresbrook Leisure Centre, Dagenham, England	
Win	13-0	(Niger) Silence Saheed	PTS	6	2006-09-15	Alexandra Palace, Wood Green, England	
Win	12-0	(England) Darren Gethin	PTS	8	2006-07-12	York Hall, Bethnal Green, England	
Win	11-0	(England) Duncan Cottier	RTD	3 (8)	2006-05-12	York Hall, Bethnal Green, England	
Win	10-0	(England) Karl Taylor	PTS	4	2006-02-17	York Hall, Bethnal Green, England	
Win	9-0	(Belgium) Zaid Bediouri	PTS	6	2006-01-28	(Republic of Ireland) National Boxing Stadium, Dublin, Ireland	
Win	8-0	(England) Matt Scriven	TKO	4 (6), 0:51	2006-01-20	York Hall, Bethnal Green, England	
Win	7-0	(England) Ben Hudson	PTS	4	2005-10-21	York Hall, Bethnal Green, England	
Win	6-0	(England) Ben Hudson	TKO	3 (6)	2005-07-09	Nottingham Arena, Nottingham, England	
Win	5-0	(England) Duncan Cottier	PTS	4	2005-04-10	Brentwood Centre, Brentwood, Essex, England	
Win	4-0	(England) Ernie Smith	PTS	6	2004-11-12	Conference Centre, Wembley, England	
Win	3-0	(England) Chris Long	TKO	4 (6), 0:44	2004-09-24	Nottingham Arena, Nottingham, England	
Win	2-0	(England) Dave Hinds	PTS	4	2004-06-12	Nottingham Arena, Nottingham, England	
Win	1-0	(England) Jason Nesbitt	PTS	4	2004-04-16	Town and Country Club, Leeds, England	

Preceded by Craig Watson	Commonwealth Welterweight Champion; 11 April 2009 – 16 April 2010	Succeeded by Denton Vassell
