= Stuart Elwell =

British boxer (born 1977)

Stuart Elwell (born 14 December 1977) is a professional boxer from Darlaston in the Black Country, England.

He became a professional boxer in the year 2000. His first fight was against Ernie Smith at Wolverhampton Civic Hall, which he won on points. His professional record currently stands at 12 wins out of 16 fights. He has one knockout victory which was shown on Sky Sports on 23 June 2006, against Francis Jones. His professional boxing career was put on hold between 2001 and 2005 when he served several years as a Royal Marine. He also boxed for the Royal Marines including a fight in Sydney, Australia. He won the British Midlands Welterweight championship only three fights into his return to civilian life.

== Boxing record ==
30 Jan 2009 Kell Brook Bethnal Green, London, England Lost ref stopped fight 2nd round

28 Nov 2008 Paul Burns Bellahouston Sports Centre, Glasgow, Scotland Won PTS 6 Rounds

4 Jul 2008 Ted Bami Everton Park Sports Centre, Liverpool, England Lost ref stopped fight 7th round

25 Mar 2008 Vyacheslav Senchenko Drusba Sportpalast, Donetsk, Ukraine Lost TKOut 2nd round

18 Feb 2008 Chris Brophy Radisson SAS Hotel, Glasgow, Scotland Won PTS 6 rounds

20 Jul 2007 Alexander Matviechuk Civic Hall, Wolverhampton, England Won PTS 6 rounds

23 Mar 2007 John O'Donnell Nottingham Ice Arena, Nottingham, England Lost PTS 10 rounds

10 Nov 2006 Ben Hudson Oakengates Theatre, Telford, England Won PTS 4 rounds

23 Jun 2006 Francis (Franny) Jones Winter Gardens, Blackpool, England Won KO 1st round

18 May 2006 Peter Dunn Town Hall, Walsall, England Won PTS 6 rounds

10 Mar 2006 David Kirk Bescot Stadium, Walsall, England Won PTS 10 rounds

25 Nov 2005 Ben Hudson Town Hall, Walsall, England Won PTS 4 rounds

6 Oct 2005 Ernie Smith Concert Hall (Formerly Town Hall), Dudley, England Won PTS 6 rounds

1 Apr 2001 Richard Inquieti Light Bar, Wolverhampton, England Won PTS 6 rounds

28 Jan 2001 Arv Mittoo Light Bar, Wolverhampton, England Won PTS 6 rounds

6 Nov 2000 Ernie Smith Civic Hall, Wolverhampton, England Won PTS 6 rounds

== Midlands welterweight champion ==
On 10 March 2006, he fought David Kirk at the Bescot Stadium, Walsall, to take the Welterweight British Midlands Area title. He won on points after 10 rounds. He gave up this belt in March 2007, when he fought for the English title belt.

== English welterweight title fight ==
On 23 March 2007, he fought John O'Donnell for the vacant English Welterweight title, a fight featured on Sky Sports 1. After a close 30-minute contest Elwell came up short 97–94.

== WBA Inter-Continental title fight ==
On 25 March 2008, he fought Vyacheslav Senchenko in Donetsk, Ukraine, for Vyacheslav's WBA Inter-Continental title. The fight was shown live on Eurosport. After a winding blow to the stomach resulting in a standing eight count, Elwell lost to a technical knockout in the second round.

== British welterweight title fight ==
On 30 January 2009, Elwell fought Kell Brook at the York Hall in Bethnal Green, England for the British Welterweight title, a fight featured on Sky Sports 1. Elwell lost in the second round after the referee stopped the bout.
