= Matthew Hatton =

British boxer (born 1981)

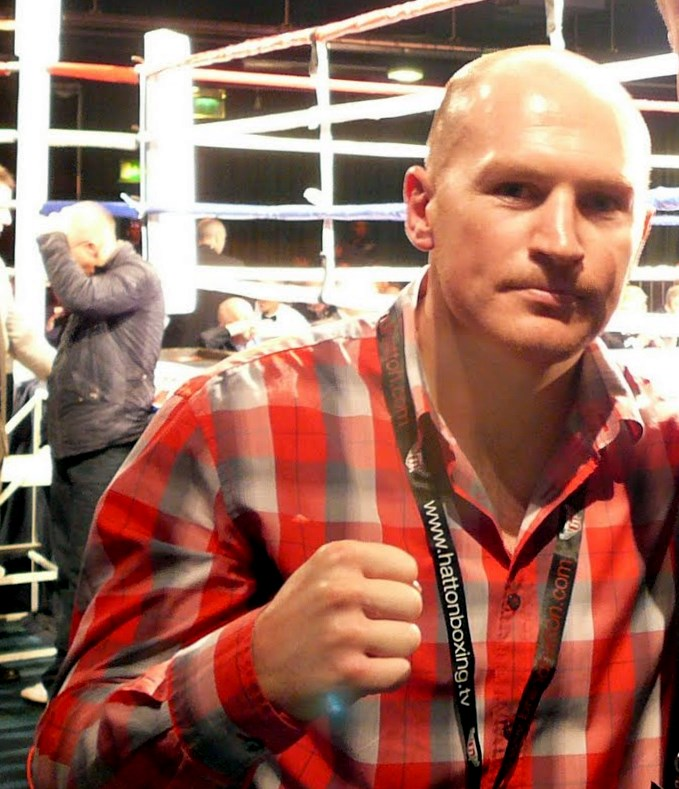
- Hatton in 2010

Personal information
- Nickname: Magic
- Nationality: British
- Born: Matthew James Hatton; 15 May 1981 (age 45) Stockport, England
- Height: 5 ft 8 1/2 in (174 cm)
- Weight: Welterweight; Light-middleweight

Boxing career
- Stance: Orthodox

Boxing record
- Total fights: 52
- Wins: 43
- Win by KO: 17
- Losses: 7
- Draws: 2

Matthew James Hatton (born 15 May 1981) is a British former professional boxer who competed from 2000 to 2013. He held the European welterweight title from 2010 to 2011, and challenged once for the WBC light-middleweight title in the latter year. He is the younger brother of former two-division world champion of boxing, Ricky Hatton, and fought on the undercard of many of Ricky's high-profile fights.

== Biography ==
Hatton was born in Stockport, Greater Manchester, England, to Ray and Carol. Before becoming a professional boxer, Hatton worked for the family carpet business as a carpet fitter. He and his girlfriend Jenna Coyne have a son named Jack, who was born in 2008 and a daughter named Lola born in 2012. Unlike his brother Ricky, dad Ray, and the majority of his family who are supporters of Manchester City, Matthew supports Manchester United.

=== Amateur ===
Hatton began boxing at the age of 12, and had 22 amateur contests, winning 18.

== Professional boxing career ==
Hatton's career as a professional boxer began in late 2000 with a point's victory over David White, on the undercard of brother Ricky's fight with Giuseppe Lauri. Hatton was undefeated in his first 13 fights before a point's loss to journeyman David Kirk in 2003. In 2004, Hatton went on to defeat Robert Burton to win the British Central Area welterweight title, and six months later defeated the same man to claim the light middleweight version of the title.

=== British Title ===
On 20 October 2006, Hatton was disqualified for low blows in the tenth and final round of a British Welterweight title eliminator against Alan Bosworth. Victory may well have given Hatton a shot at the British Welterweight title which was held at the time by Scottish boxer Kevin Anderson.

In 2007, Hatton won the IBF International welterweight title by defeating American Frank Houghtaling, and in his next fight defeated Puerto Rican Edwin Vazquez to win the IBF Inter-Continental title. Both fights were held in Las Vegas, Nevada on the undercard of Ricky Hatton's fights with Juan Urango and José Luis Castillo.

=== Commonwealth Title ===
On 28 May 2008, Hatton lost to Craig Watson on a points decision with scores of 116–112, 117–112 and 118–111 in a challenge for the Commonwealth welterweight championship. The fight was held at the City of Manchester Stadium on the undercard of Ricky Hatton's fight with Juan Lazcano.

A short time after his loss to Watson, Hatton decided to leave long-time trainer Billy Graham and his Phoenix Camp Gym. Hatton would go on to be trained at Bobby Rimmer's Boxing Academy based in Stalybridge under the guidance of Lee Beard, who is also assistant trainer to Ricky Hatton.

=== Hatton vs. Ben Tackie ===
Hatton fought former World title challenger Ben Tackie on the undercard of Ricky Hatton's fight with Paul Malignaggi at the MGM Grand, Las Vegas on 22 November 2008. Tackie was defeated by Matthew Hatton over 12 rounds in December 2003. Hatton defeated Tackie via a convincing unanimous decision with scores of 98–92, 98–92 and 97–93 in a performance which has been described as the best of his career.

=== Hatton vs. Bami ===
On 28 March 2009, Hatton defeated Ted Bami via a 6th round stoppage in an eliminator for the IBO welterweight Title.

=== Hatton vs. N'dou ===
Hatton was scheduled to fight Zab Judah on 19 September 2009 at the MGM Grand arena in a welterweight bout as part of the undercard of the Mayweather-Marquez fight. This fight was postponed due to the main bout being postponed owing to a rib injury to Mayweather. Instead Hatton fought Lovemore N'dou for the IBO Welterweight title at Fenton Manor in Stoke-on-Trent on 13 November 2009, the contest was scored a draw.

=== Hatton vs. Branco ===
Hatton claimed the vacant European welterweight title with a unanimous points win over Gianluca Branco in Dagenham on 26 March 2010. Branco, having only lost twice previous to this fight (against Arturo Gatti & Miguel Cotto), came into the fight as Hatton's toughest test to date. Branco caught Hatton with a right hand in the first round which seemed to have him hurt, but Hatton overcame it and went on to claim the decision, allowing him to fully escape older brother Ricky's shadow and become "The European Welterweight Champion Of The World".

=== Hatton vs. Álvarez ===
In March 2011, Hatton lost to Canelo Álvarez in a bid for the WBC light-middleweight title. The bigger and stronger Alvarez was docked a point in round seven ultimately leading to all three judges scoring the bout at 119–108 in favor of Alvarez.

=== Hatton vs. Brook ===
In March 2012, Hatton lost to undefeated Kell Brook in an all-British clash at the Motorpoint Arena in Sheffield. The quicker, more technically astute Brook outclassed Hatton over 12 rounds, and won the fight via a Unanimous Decision.

=== Hatton vs. Lomax ===
In October 2012, Hatton won a 1st-round knockout to journeyman Michael Lomax. It was a comeback bout after his disappointing defeat to Kell Brook, and a determined Hatton took the fight easily.

=== Hatton vs. Van Heerden ===
In his first fight of the year in February 2013, Hatton lost a unanimous decision to IBO Welterweight champion Chris Van Heerden. The South African outclassed him throughout with a smarter skillset that may have shattered future title hopes for the British boxer.

== Championships held ==
- IBF Inter-Continental Welterweight title
- IBF International Welterweight title
- British Central Area Welterweight title
- British Central Area Light-Middleweight title
- European Welterweight title

== Professional boxing record ==
43 Wins (17 knockouts, 25 decisions), 7 Losses, 2 Draws
Res.	Record	Opponent	Type	Rd., Time	Date	Location	Notes
Loss	43-7-2	(South Africa) Chris van Heerden	UD	12 (12)	2013-02-03	Sandton Convention Center, South Africa	
Loss	43-6-2	(England) Kell Brook	UD	12 (12)	2012-03-17	Motorpoint Arena Sheffield, England	
Loss	43-5-2	(Mexico) Canelo Álvarez	UD	12 (12)	2011-03-05	(United States) Honda Center, Anaheim, California	For vacant WBC light middleweight title
Win	43-4-2	(Switzerland) Roberto Belge	KO	1 (12)	2010-11-26	Reebok Stadium, Bolton, Greater Manchester, England	Retained EBU (European) welterweight title
Win	42-4-2	(Ukraine) Yuriy Nuzhnenko	UD	12 (12)	2010-07-16	Bolton Arena, Bolton, Greater Manchester, England	Retained EBU (European) welterweight title, Hatton down in 1st
Win	41-4-2	(Italy) Gianluca Branco	UD	12 (12)	2010-03-26	Goresbrook Leisure Centre, Dagenham, Essex, England	Won vacant EBU (European) welterweight title
Win	40-4-2	(Georgia (country)) Mikheil Khutsishvili	TKO	5 (8); 2:35	2010-02-19	Fenton Manor Sports Complex, Stoke, Staffordshire, England	
Draw	39-4-2	(Australia) Lovemore N'dou	Draw	12 (12)	2009-11-13	Fenton Manor Sports Complex, Stoke, Staffordshire, England	International Boxing Organization Welterweight Title
Win	39-4-1	(Australia) Ernesto Zepeda	UD	8 (8)	2009-05-02	MGM Grand, Las Vegas, Nevada, United States	
Win	38-4-1	(Republic of the Congo) Ted Bami	TKO	6 (12); 2:03	2009-03-28	Leisure Centre, Altrincham, Greater Manchester, England	IBO Welterweight Title Eliminator; Bami came in one pound over the weight limit on his first visit to the scales
Win	37-4-1	(Ghana) Ben Tackie	UD	10 (10)	2008-11-22	MGM Grand, Las Vegas, Nevada, United States	
Win	36-4-1	(England) Scott Woolford	MD	8 (8)	2008-09-05	Harvey Hadden Leisure Centre, Nottingham, Nottinghamshire, England	
Loss	35-4-1	(England) Craig Watson	UD	12 (12)	2008-05-24	City of Manchester Stadium, Manchester, England	
Win	35-3-1	(Puerto Rico) Frankie Santos	UD	8 (8)	2007-12-08	MGM Grand, Las Vegas, Nevada, United States	
Win	34-3-1	(Finland) Samuli Leppiaho	RTD	6 (8); 3:00	2007-10-20	(Republic of Ireland) National Stadium, Dublin, Ireland	
Win	33-3-1	(Puerto Rico) Edwin Vazquez	UD	12 (12)	2007-06-23	Thomas & Mack Center, Las Vegas, Nevada, United States	Retained IBF Inter-Continental Welterweight Title
Win	32-3-1	(United States) Frank Houghtaling	RTD	7 (12); 3:00	2007-01-20	Paris Las Vegas, Las Vegas, Nevada, United States	Won vacant IBF Inter-Continental Welterweight Title
Win	31-3-1	(Ukraine) Volodymyr Borovskyi	MD	6 (6)	2006-12-10	Octagon Centre, Sheffield, Yorkshire, England	

== See also ==
- List of European Boxing Union welterweight champions
- List of boxing families#Hatton family
