= Álvaro Robles (boxer) =

Mexican boxer (born 1989)

Personal information
- Nickname: Tyson
- Nationality: Mexican
- Born: Álvaro Robles; 11 January 1989 (age 37)
- Height: 1.83 m (6 ft 0 in)
- Weight: Light middleweight Welterweight

Boxing career
- Reach: 189 cm (74 in)
- Stance: Orthodox

Boxing record
- Total fights: 26
- Wins: 19
- Win by KO: 17
- Losses: 7
- Draws: 0
- No contests: 0

Álvaro Robles (born 11 January 1989) is a Mexican professional boxer and is a former WBC FECARBOX welterweight Champion.

== Professional career ==
In October 2010, Robles beat Rafael Ortiz by technical knockout to win the vacant WBC FECARBOX welterweight title.
