= Anthony Joshua vs. Dominic Breazeale =

Boxing match

- Date: 25 June 2016
- Venue: The O2 Arena, London, England
- Title(s) on the line: IBF Heavyweight Championship

Tale of the tape
Boxer	Anthony Joshua	Dominic Breazeale
Nickname	AJ	Trouble
Hometown	London, England	Glendale, California, U.S.
Pre-fight record	16–0 (16 KOs)	17–0 (15 KOs)
Age	26 years, 8 months	30 years, 10 months
Height	6 ft 6 in (198 cm)	6 ft 7 in (201 cm)
Weight	243 lb (110 kg)	255 lb (116 kg)
Style	Orthodox	Orthodox
Recognition	IBF; Heavyweight Champion; The Ring; No. 5 Ranked Heavyweight; TBRB; No. 6 Ranked Heavyweight	IBF; No. 9 Ranked Heavyweight

Result
- Joshua wins via seventh-round technical knockout

Anthony Joshua vs. Dominic Breazeale was a professional boxing match contested on 25 June 2016, for the IBF heavyweight championship. The bout took place at The O2 Arena in London.

Joshua defeated Breazeale, retaining his heavyweight title via seventh-round technical knockout (TKO).

== Background ==
Following Joshua's win over Charles Martin on 9 April, a second-round technical knockout (TKO) to capture the IBF heavyweight title, a shortlist of potential opponents for Joshua's first defence included former WBC champion Bermane Stiverne, former world title challenger Eric Molina and the IBF's number 13 ranked undefeated contender Dominic Breazeale.

On 21 April, Joshua revealed his next fight would take place on 25 June at The O2 Arena, with Breazeale being announced as the opponent a few days later, with Joshua quoted as saying "I am looking to get past Breazeale in style and continue moving towards the unification fight everybody is waiting for". Joshua's promoter Eddie Hearn had previously said that Joshua would fight on 9 July at Wembley, that plan changed when the rematch between unified heavyweight champion Tyson Fury and former long reigning champion Wladimir Klitschko would take place Manchester on that day.

== The fights ==
=== Undercard ===
The preliminary bouts saw wins for prospects Ted Cheeseman and Anthony Ogogo as well as for super flyweight contender Kal Yafai. The live PPV card began with Andrea Scarpa stopping John Wayne Hibbert, followed by stoppage wins for Dillian Whyte and Conor Benn.

=== Eubank Jr. vs. Doran ===
Next there was a British middleweight title bout between champion Chris Eubank Jr (WBA:2nd WBC:3rd) and challenger Tom Doran (WBC:25th).

==== The fight ====
Doran was down once in the third round and three times in the fourth as the referee ended the fight.

==== Aftermath ====
Eubank Jr. once again called out undefeated unified WBA and IBF middleweight champion Gennady Golovkin in a post-fight interview with Sky Sports. Throughout the year, Eubank Jr. had called out Golvokin on multiple occasions. In July 2016, Golovkin was confirmed to have signed his end of a contract to face Eubank on 10 September. However on 8 July Eubank Jr. was removed from the fight by promoter Eddie Hearn who offered the deal to IBF welterweight champion Kell Brook, who took the deal to fight Golovkin. Eubank Jr. responded to being replaced by stating he "had never been presented with the fight contract." Boxers including Tommy Langford, Martin Murray, Curtis Stevens began calling out Eubank.

Preceded by vs. Nick Blackwell	Chris Eubank Jr's bouts 25 June 2016	Succeeded by ~~vs. Tommy Langford~~ vs. Renold Quinlan
Preceded by vs. Luke Keeler	Tom Doran's bouts 25 June 2016	Retired

=== Groves vs. Murray ===
The chief support saw three time world title challenger George Groves (WBC:2nd, WBA:4th, IBF:9th) meet domestic rival and four-time world title challenger Martin Murray (WBC:10th) in a WBA super middleweight title eliminator.

Speaking in the build up Groves described Martin as "...the perfect fight for me at this stage. He's a seasoned campaigner, who's boxed at the highest level for quite some time. He is a world level opponent and I'll have to be fully focused and prepared to beat him. A win against Murray on the biggest stage will open a lot of doors and bring me a step closer to achieving my goal of becoming world champion. I'm fully expecting it to be a war; I can't wait."

Murray made weight on the second attempt.

==== The fight ====
Groves hurt Murray with a right uppercut at the end of 7th, a left-right combination at the end of the 9th and a pair of big right hands in the 12th. Murray had Groves looking hurt in the 10th after hitting him with a left hook to the head. Both fighters looked tired and ragged in the 12th round. Their conditioning looked less than to be desired at that point in the fight.

At the end of 12 rounds Groves defeated Murray via a 12-round unanimous decision. The three judges scored the fight at 118–110, giving Murray only two rounds.

==== Aftermath ====
Groves told Sky Sports in the aftermath, "I think I performed great, but I got caught with punches, Martin Murray is a class act and should be a world champion. It was make or break, but I had him out on his feet. That was my first step up since losing to Badou Jack. I did well but hats off to Murray. What a performer."

Preceded by vs. David Brophy	George Groves's bouts 25 June 2016	Succeeded by vs. Eduard Gutknecht
Preceded by vs. Cedric Spera	Martin Murray's bouts 25 June 2016	Succeeded by vs. Nuhu Lawal

=== Main Event ===
With not much action in the opener, a clean left hook from Joshua was the highlight of the round. In the second, Joshua began putting combination punches together and throwing at will. In the final minute, a right uppercut and left hook sent the American staggering across the ring. Breazeale began round three with a swollen right eye, a round in which both fighters began trading power punches, with Joshua snapping Breazeale's head back with stiff jabs and a looping left hook in the final seconds of the round. Round four saw much of the same from Joshua, with Breazeale's punch output slowing, Joshua controlled the round with jabs and power punches. Near the halfway point of round five, Joshua landed a left hook to momentarily stun Breazeale, followed by a brief moment of success by the challenger with a right hand. The sixth was a slow-paced round, with Breazeale finding the target, resulting in a bloodied nose for Joshua. The end came in the seventh, with Breazeale backing up against the ropes, Joshua unloaded a barrage of punches to send the American to the canvas. Breazeale beat the referee's count of ten, only to be backed up again with a flurry of punches, ending with a left hand to send the challenger down for the second time and prompting the referee to call a halt to the fight. At the time of the stoppage, 1 minute 1 second into the round, Joshua was ahead on the scorecards, with all three judges scoring the bout 60–54.

== Aftermath ==
Asked about Joshua's next opponent his promoter Eddie Hearn said: "November. We like the Joseph Parker fight, that's the mandatory, we'll have to deal with that at some point, whether that's November, December or whether that's March, April that's a good fight." he mentioned former long reigning champion Wladimir Klitschko as "a fight we'd love as well, but I'm always reluctant to make a fight of that magnitude in November", before adding "He needs a long rest. He needs to go and be a young boy, go and sit on the beach with his mates and mess around. It's been absolutely relentless." David Price and David Haye were also mentioned as options.

== Fight card ==
Confirmed bouts:

Weight Class		vs.		Method	Round	Time	Notes
Heavyweight	Anthony Joshua (c)	def.	Dominic Breazeale	TKO	7/12	1:01	^{Note 1}
Super-middleweight	George Groves (c)	def.	Martin Murray	UD	12		^{Note 2}
Middleweight	Chris Eubank Jr (c)	def.	Tom Doran	TKO	4/12	2:35	^{Note 3}
Middleweight	Felix Cash	def.	Yailton Neves	PTS	4
Super-lightweight	Conor Benn	def.	Lukas Radic	KO	1/4	2:31
Heavyweight	Dillian Whyte	def.	Ivica Bacurin	KO	6/8	2:06
Super-lightweight	Andrea Scarpa	def.	John Wayne Hibbert	TKO	6/12	2:55	^{Note 4}
Preliminary bouts
Middleweight	Anthony Ogogo	def.	Frane Radnic	RTD	1/6	3:00
Bantamweight	Khalid Yafai	def.	Jozstef Ajtai	TKO	1/8	1:42
Light-middleweight	Ted Cheeseman	def.	Danny Little	TKO	5/6	1:03

^Note 1 For IBF heavyweight title
^Note 2 For WBA International super-middleweight title
^Note 3 For British middleweight title
^Note 4 For vacant WBC Silver super-lightweight title

== Broadcasting ==
Country	Broadcaster
Australia	Fox Sports
Hungary	Sport 1
New Zealand	Sky Arena
Panama	Cable Onda Sports
United Kingdom	Sky Sports
United States	Showtime

Preceded by vs. Charles Martin	Anthony Joshua' bouts 25 June 2016	Succeeded by vs. Éric Molina
Preceded by vs. Amir Mansour	Dominic Breazeale's bouts 25 June 2016	Succeeded by vs. Izu Ugonoh
