= Brian McIntyre =

American boxer and boxing trainer

Personal information
- Nickname: Bomac
- Born: July 1, 1970 (age 56) Omaha, Nebraska, U.S.
- Weight: Cruiserweight; Heavyweight

Boxing career
- Stance: Orthodox

Boxing record
- Total fights: 21
- Wins: 7
- Win by KO: 2
- Losses: 14

Brian Lamont McIntyre (born July 1, 1970), better known by his nickname "Bomac", is an American boxing trainer and former professional boxer. He is considered one of the best trainers in boxing. McIntyre is the enduring boxing coach of five-division and three-weight undisputed world champion Terence Crawford. He has also worked with Chris Eubank Jr and former world champions Amir Khan, Jamel Herring, Maurice Hooker, and Keyshawn Davis.

== Early life and boxing career ==
=== Early life ===
McIntyre grew up on the same street as Terence Crawford in Omaha, Nebraska and has known him his entire life. The pair initially trained under Midge Minor, before McIntyre recognized Crawford's talent and began guiding him himself.

=== Boxing career ===
McIntyre competed professionally from 1994 to 2007, spending most of his career as a heavyweight and finishing with a 7–14 record (2 KOs). His most notable bout came in November 2004, when he went the four-round distance in a decision loss to Butterbean. After five consecutive knockout defeats, he retired to focus on coaching.

== Boxing trainer ==
McIntyre has trained several world champions and other notable boxers, including:

Boxer	Weight classes	Titles held	Notes
Terence Crawford	Lightweight; Light welterweight Welterweight; Light middleweight Super middleweight	WBO, The Ring, and NABO lightweight titles; WBA (Super), WBC, IBF, WBO, and The Ring light welterweight titles; WBA (Super), WBC, IBF, WBO, and The Ring welterweight titles; WBA and Interim WBO light middleweight titles; WBA (Super), WBC, IBF, WBO, and The Ring super middleweight titles	McIntyre has guided Crawford throughout his professional career, which began in 2008, helping him become world champion in five weight classes, from lightweight to super middleweight.
Steven Nelson	Super middleweight Light heavyweight	NABO super middleweight title	Nelson, a native of Omaha, Nebraska, has been working with McIntyre since turning professional in 2016. He is also the executive director at McIntyre's B&B Sports Academy.
Jamel Herring	Super featherweight Lightweight	WBO and IBF–USBA super featherweight titles	McIntyre trained Herring from 2018 to 2022. Under McIntyre's tutelage, Herring won seven consecutive fights, including the WBO super featherweight title, which he defended three consecutive times before losing to Shakur Stevenson. After that fight, McIntyre and Herring had a dispute, which led to Herring being booted from the team.
Maurice Hooker	Light welterweight Welterweight	WBO and NABO light welterweight titles	Hooker began working with McIntyre after being defeated by José Ramírez and losing his WBO light welterweight title on July 27, 2019.
Rob Brant	Light middleweight Middleweight; Super middleweight	WBA (Regular), NABA, and WBC Continental Americas middleweight titles	Brant a former WBA (Regular) middleweight champion, had McIntyre in his corner for his fight against Vitalii Kopylenko on August 22, 2020. He stopped Kopylenko after five one-sided rounds.
Keyshawn Davis	Lightweight	WBO, WBC–USNBC, IBF Inter-Continental, IBF–USBA, and WBO Inter-Continental lightweight titles	Davis has trained under McIntyre since turning professional in 2021. In February 2025, he captured the WBO lightweight title after defeating Denys Berinchyk by knockout in round four.
Amir Khan	Lightweight; Light welterweight Welterweight; Middleweight	WBA International, WBO Inter-Continental, and Commonwealth lightweight titles; WBA (Super), IBF, and WBC Silver light welterweight titles; WBA International, WBC Silver, and WBC International welterweight titles	Former WBA and IBF light welterweight champion Amir Khan decided to work with McIntyre ahead of his final professional bout against Kell Brook on February 19, 2022.
Lester Martínez	Super middleweight	WBC and WBO Latino super middleweight titles	Martínez, a super middleweight from Guatemala, joined McIntyre's team after defeating Isaiah Steen by TKO in round eight on April 10, 2023. He challenged Christian M'billi for the interim WBC super middleweight title on September 13, 2025, fighting to a closely contested draw. The WBC has ordered a rematch.
Troy Isley	Middleweight	NABO middleweight title	Isley, concerned about his readiness for his upcoming bout against Vladimir Hernandez on November 16, 2023, decided a change was needed and chose to work under McIntyre. Isley won the bout, and later captured the NABO middleweight title.
Chris Eubank Jr	Middleweight; Super middleweight	IBO, Interim WBA and British middleweight titles; IBO super middleweight title	Eubank hired McIntyre to train him in the summer of 2023 for his rematch against Liam Smith. Eubank avenged his loss by defeating Smith by TKO in round 10 on September 2, 2023. McIntyre is now helping Eubank prepare for his rematch against Conor Benn on November 15, 2025.

== Personal life ==
McIntyre still resides in Omaha, Nebraska, and is married with a daughter. In October 2013, he co-founded B&B Sports Academy, a nonprofit gym dedicated to building the mind, body, and character of young people, particularly those at risk. It has since developed into a full-service multi-sport company with an emphasis on life skills. The academy provides tutoring, summer activities, and competitive travel opportunities for young athletes.

In September 2023, McIntyre was arrested in Manchester, England, after a firearm and ammunition were found in his luggage at the airport. He received a 20-month suspended sentence following two gun charges, but was subsequently released and free to travel home to the United States.

== Awards and honors ==
- The Ring magazine Trainer of the Year: 2023
  - Nominee: 2025
- Boxing Writers Association of America Trainer of the Year Award: 2023
- McIntyre received special recognition for trainer excellence from the World Boxing Organization in 2023
- ESPN Trainer of the Year: 2023
- The Sporting News Trainer of the Year: 2023
- BoxingScene Trainer of the Year: 2023
- 3Kings Boxing's Trainer of the Year: 2023

Awards
Preceded by Derrick James	BWAA Trainer of the Year; 2023	Succeeded by Robert Garcia
