= Sheedy =

Sheedy is a surname. Notable people with the surname include:

- Ally Sheedy (born 1962), American screen and stage actress
- Callum Sheedy (born 1995), Wales rugby union player
- Charles E. Sheedy (1912–1990), Catholic priest and professor
- Charles Sheedy (born 1958), member of the West Virginia House of Delegates
- Dan Sheedy (born 2001), Internet personality
- Jack Sheedy (Gaelic footballer) (21st century), Dublin football player
- Jack Sheedy (Australian rules footballer) (1926–2023), East Fremantle Football Club player
- Kevin Sheedy (Australian footballer) (born 1947), former coach of AFL club Essendon
- Kevin Sheedy (Irish footballer) (born 1959), Republic of Ireland footballer
- Liam Sheedy (born 1969), Irish hurling manager and former player
- Sam Sheedy (born 1988), English professional boxer
