= Felix Cash =

English boxer (born 1993)

Personal information
- Born: 31 March 1993 (age 33) Chertsey, Surrey, England
- Height: 6 ft 1 in (185 cm)
- Weight: Middleweight

Boxing career
- Reach: 73 in (185 cm)
- Stance: Orthodox

Boxing record
- Total fights: 18
- Wins: 17
- Win by KO: 11
- Losses: 1
Medal record
Men's amateur boxing
English National Championships
Silver medal – second place	2013 Houghton-le-Spring	Middleweight

Felix Cash (born 31 March 1993) is an English professional boxer. He has held the Commonwealth middleweight title since 2019 and the British middleweight title since 2021.

== Professional career ==
Cash made his professional debut on the undercard of Anthony Joshua vs. Dominic Breazeale on 25 June 2016, scoring a four-round points decision (PTS) victory against Yailton Neves at The O2 Arena in London.

After winning his first 9 fights, 6 by stoppage, he faced Stephen Danyo for the vacant WBC International Silver middleweight title on 28 October 2018 at the Copper Box Arena, London. Cash won by a shutout unanimous decision (UD) victory over 10 rounds with all three judges scoring the bout 100–90.

In his next fight he fought Rasheed Abolaji for the vacant Commonwealth middleweight title on 2 February 2019, at The O2 Arena. Halfway through the first round, Cash dropped Abolaji with a jab. He made it to his feet by the referee's count of six and upon doing so, was met with a combination of punches to the head and body. With 27 seconds remaining of the round, Cash landed a right hand to the chin of his opponent. As Abolaji was on his way down, Cash landed a right uppercut, causing Abolaji to fall face-first to the canvas. He rose to his feet before the count of ten but immediately stumbled backwards, prompting referee Marcus McDonnell to call a halt to the contest, awarding the Commonwealth title with a first-round technical knockout (TKO).

The first defence of his Commonwealth title came on 2 November 2019, against Jack Cullen at the Manchester Arena on the undercard of Katie Taylor's world title challenge against Christina Linardatou. Cash landed a right hand to the head which stunned Cullen in the opening round. After taking another right hand, Cullen began backing up, only to be on the receiving end of a three punch combination which sent him to the canvas. In the final 30 seconds of round seven, after taking several powerful punches ending with a left hook, Cullen took a knee to receive an eight count from the referee. In round eight, after Cullen was on the receiving end of several unanswered blows, referee Howard Foster called a halt to the contest with 1 minute and 46 seconds remaining in the round, handing Cash an eighth-round TKO victory.

His second defence—and only fight of 2020—came against former British middleweight champion and world title challenger Jason Welborn on 14 August, at the Matchroom Sport headquarters in Brentwood, Essex. In a fight which saw Cash receive a point deduction in the fifth round for punching below the belt, he went on to win by TKO in the final 30 seconds of the round after Welborn's corner threw in the towel following two knockdowns.

After nearly a year out of the ring, it was announced on 17 March 2021 that Cash's next fight would take place on 24 April, against reigning British middleweight champion Denzel Bentley. Cash stunned his opponent with a left hook in the opening round, causing Bentley to stumble backwards into a corner. In the third, Cash landed a right hand to force Bentley into the ropes. After a series of follow-up right hands from Cash, referee Victor Loughlin stepped in to call a halt to the contest, awarding Cash the British title via TKO at 1 minute 23 seconds of the third round. In the post-fight interview, Cash stated his intentions to fight for the European title, saying, "I want the third [belt] now, I want the European, then we'll move on. We've got a lot of big names out there. You have got Chris Eubank, you have got Liam Williams and a few others."

Cash challenged Tyler Denny for European middleweight title on 22 June 2024 at Resorts World Arena in Birmingham. The referee stopped the fight in the fifth round due to a cut on Cash's right eyelid caused by an accidental clash of heads. All three judges scorecards had Denny ahead at that point meaning he retained his crown via technical decision.

== Professional boxing record ==
18 fights	17 wins	1 loss
By knockout	11	0
By decision	6	1

No.	Result	Record	Opponent	Type	Round, time	Date	Location	Notes
17	Loss	16–1	Tyler Denny	TD	5	22 Jun 2024	Resorts World Arena, Birmingham, England	Stopped due to cut following accidental head clash
16	Win	16–0	Celso Neves	PTS	8	10 Dec 2022	First Direct Arena, Leeds, England	
15	Win	15–0	Magomed Madiev	UD	10	12 Feb 2022	Alexandra Palace, London, England	Won vacant WBC International middleweight title
14	Win	14–0	Denzel Bentley	TKO	3 (12), 1:24	24 Apr 2021	York Hall, London, England	Retained Commonwealth middleweight title; Won British middleweight title
13	Win	13–0	Jason Welborn	TKO	5 (12), 2:48	14 Aug 2020	Matchroom Headquarters, Brentwood, England	Retained Commonwealth middleweight title
12	Win	12–0	Jack Cullen	TKO	8 (12), 1:14	2 Nov 2019	Manchester Arena, Manchester, England	Retained Commonwealth middleweight title
11	Win	11–0	Rasheed Abolaji	TKO	1 (12), 2:45	2 Feb 2019	O2 Arena, London, England	Won vacant Commonwealth middleweight title
10	Win	10–0	Stephen Danyo	UD	10	27 Oct 2018	Copper Box Arena, London, England	Won vacant WBC International Silver middleweight title
9	Win	9–0	Francis Tchoffo	PTS	8	6 Jun 2018	York Hall, London, England	
8	Win	8–0	James Hagenimana	TKO	5 (8), 1:27	3 Feb 2018	O2 Arena, London, England	
7	Win	7–0	Greg O'Neill	TKO	1 (6), 0:54	13 Dec 2017	York Hall, London, England	
6	Win	6–0	Fernando Heredia	TKO	1 (6), 2:15	1 Sep 2017	York Hall, London, England	
5	Win	5–0	Jay Byrne	PTS	6	17 Mar 2017	York Hall, London, England	
4	Win	4–0	Sam Wall	TKO	1 (6), 2:08	26 Nov 2016	Wembley Arena, London, England	
3	Win	3–0	Christian Hoskin-Gomez	TKO	1 (6), 2:16	29 Sep 2016	York Hall, London, England	
2	Win	2–0	Edgars Sniedze	TKO	2 (4), 1:40	30 Jul 2016	First Direct Arena, Leeds, England	
1	Win	1–0	Yailton Neves	PTS	4	25 Jun 2016	O2 Arena, London, England	

Sporting positions
Regional boxing titles
Vacant Title last held by Jason Welborn	WBC International Silver middleweight champion 27 October 2018 – January 2019	Vacant Title next held by Marcus Morrison
Vacant Title last held by Liam Cameron; Stripped	Commonwealth middleweight champion 2 February 2019 – present	Incumbent
Preceded by Denzel Bentley	British middleweight champion 24 April 2021 – present	Incumbent
