= JJ Metcalf =

English boxer (born 1988)

James Metcalf
Personal information
- Nickname: Kid Shamrock
- Nationality: English
- Born: 27 July 1988 (age 37) Liverpool, England
- Height: 5 ft 9 in (175 cm)
- Weight: Light-middleweight, Super-welterweight

Boxing career
- Stance: Orthodox

Boxing record
- Total fights: 28
- Wins: 26
- Win by KO: 15
- Losses: 2

James "JJ" Metcalf (born 27 July 1988) is an English professional boxer who has held the IBO super-welterweight title since May 2023. He previously held the Commonwealth super-welterweight title in 2019 and challenged for the British super-welterweight title in March 2021. He is the son of former boxer Shea Neary.

== Professional career ==
Metcalf made his professional debut on 3 December 2011, scoring a four-round points decision (PTS) victory over Kevin McCauley at the Robin Park Centre in Wigan, England.

After compiling a record of 17–0 (9 KOs) he was scheduled to face Jorge Fortea for the vacant WBC International super-welterweight title on 9 June 2018 at the Manchester Arena, as part of the undercard of Tyson Fury's comeback fight against Sefer Seferi. In the week leading up to the fight, Fortea withdrew from the contest with Aitor Nieto stepping in as a late replacement. Metcalf defeated Nieto via twelfth-round technical knockout (TKO) to capture the WBC International title.

He was scheduled to return to the Manchester Arena to defend his title against former British and Commonwealth super-welterweight champion, Liam Williams, on 22 December 2018 on the undercard of the Josh Warrington vs. Carl Frampton world title fight. The fight was put in jeopardy after Metcalf suffered an ankle injury. He told promoter Frank Warren that he would inform Warren six weeks prior to the fight whether or not he was fit to go ahead. However, after Warren had lined up a potential replacement for Williams in the event of Metcalf pulling out, Williams decided to instead fight the replacement, Mark Heffron, for the vacant British middleweight title. Metcalf had expressed his intention to go ahead with the bout.

After the fight with Williams failed to materialise, Metcalf's next fight came against Santos Medrano in April 2019 in a non-title fight, with Metcalf scoring a KO victory in the eighth and final round. After suffering a hand injury in the fight with Medrano, it was expected that Metcalf would not fight again until the end of the year. However, he was scheduled to face former British middleweight champion and former world title challenger, Jason Welborn, for the vacant Commonwealth super-welterweight title on 15 June 2019 at the First Direct Arena in Leeds, again on a Josh Warrington undercard, this time in a world title defence against Kid Galahad. In a fight which saw Metcalf receive a point deduction for repeated low blows, he scored a KO in the eighth round with a left hook to the body to capture the Commonwealth title.

After a TKO victory against Jan Balog in February 2020, Metcalf challenged Ted Cheeseman for the vacant British super-welterweight title on 27 March, at the Europa Point Sports Complex in Gibraltar. The bout was a part of the undercard of Alexander Povetkin vs. Dillian Whyte II, and was televised live on Sky Sports Box Office. In a closely contested fight, Metcalf was hurt and left on unsteady legs in the fourth, but was able to see out the remainder of the round. Metcalf twice returned the favour, hurting Cheeseman in the sixth and eleventh rounds. After hurting Cheeseman in the eleventh, the latter came back with a combination of punches to knock Metcalf to the canvas. He made it back to his feet on unsteady legs, prompting referee Ian John Lewis to call a halt to the contest, handing Metcalf the first defeat of his career via TKO.

Metcalf won the IBO super-welterweight World title on 20 May 2023 when he scored a unanimous decision victory against defending champion Dennis Hogan at the 3Arena in Dublin, Ireland.

== Professional boxing record ==
27 fights	25 wins	2 losses
By knockout	15	1
By decision	10	1

No.	Result	Record	Opponent	Type	Round, time	Date	Location	Notes
27	Win	25–2	(Republic of Ireland) Dennis Hogan	UD	12	20 May 2023	(Republic of Ireland) 3Arena, Dublin, Ireland	Won IBO light middleweight title
26	Win	24–2	(United States) Courtney Pennington	RTD	6 (10), 3:00	10 Dec 2022	(United Kingdom) First Direct Arena, Leeds, England	Retained WBA Continental super welterweight title
25	Win	23–2	(Spain) Kerman Lejarraga	UD	10	20 May 2022	Bilbao Arena, Bilbao, Spain	Won vacant WBA Continental super welterweight title
24	Win	22–2	(Russia) Evgenii Vazem	TKO	5 (6), 1:05	16 Apr 2022	(United Kingdom) Manchester Arena, Manchester, England	
23	Loss	21–2	(United Kingdom) Kieron Conway	UD	10	9 Oct 2021	(United Kingdom) Liverpool Arena, Liverpool, England	
22	Loss	21–1	(United Kingdom) Ted Cheeseman	TKO	11 (12), 3:10	27 Mar 2021	Europa Point Sports Complex, Gibraltar	For vacant British super-welterweight title
21	Win	21–0	(Czech Republic) Jan Balog	TKO	1 (6), 0:32	28 Feb 2020	(United Kingdom) Grand Central Hall, Liverpool, England	
20	Win	20–0	(United Kingdom) Jason Welborn	KO	8 (12), 2:25	15 Jun 2019	(United Kingdom) First Direct Arena, Leeds, England	Won vacant Commonwealth super-welterweight title
19	Win	19–0	(Nicaragua) Santos Medrano	KO	8 (8), 0:30	19 Apr 2019	(United Kingdom) Liverpool Olympia, Liverpool, England	
18	Win	18–0	(Spain) Aitor Nieto	TKO	12 (12), 2:30	9 Jun 2018	(United Kingdom) Manchester Arena, Manchester, England	Won vacant WBC International super-welterweight title
17	Win	17–0	(United Kingdom) Damon Jones	TKO	6 (10)	21 Oct 2017	(United Kingdom) First Direct Arena, Leeds, England	
16	Win	16–0	(Bulgaria) Konstantin Alexandrov	TKO	1 (6), 2:00	15 Jul 2017	(United Kingdom) Winter Gardens, Blackpool, England	
15	Win	15–0	(United Kingdom) Jason Ball	RTD	5 (8), 3:00	8 Apr 2017	(United Kingdom) Manchester Arena, Manchester, England	
14	Win	14–0	(Cameroon) Serge Ambomo	PTS	8	7 Oct 2016	(United Kingdom) Greenbank Sports Academy, Liverpool, England	
13	Win	13–0	(United Kingdom) Darryl Sharp	PTS	4	9 Jul 2016	(United Kingdom) Tudor Grange Leisure Centre, Solihull, England	
12	Win	12–0	(United Kingdom) Tom Knight	TKO	1 (6), 2:48	29 May 2016	(United Kingdom) Goodison Park, Liverpool, England	
11	Win	11–0	(Estonia) Aleksei Tsatiasvili	TKO	4 (6), 2:17	28 Aug 2015	H10 Andalusia Plaza, Puerto Banús, Spain	
10	Win	10–0	(United Kingdom) Chris Jenkinson	RTD	2 (6), 3:00	25 Jul 2015	(United Kingdom) Sports Village, Ellesmere Port, England	
9	Win	9–0	(United Kingdom) William Warburton	PTS	10	21 Mar 2015	(United Kingdom) Liverpool Olympia, Liverpool, England	
8	Win	8–0	(United Kingdom) Danny Shannon	TKO	6 (6), 2:41	6 Dec 2014	(United Kingdom) Liverpool Olympia, Liverpool, England	
7	Win	7–0	(United Kingdom) Ryan Toms	KO	2 (6), 2:21	27 Sep 2014	(United Kingdom) Liverpool Olympia, Liverpool, England	
6	Win	6–0	(United Kingdom) Gary Boulden	PTS	6	20 Jun 2014	(United Kingdom) Southport Theatre, Southport, England	
5	Win	5–0	(United Kingdom) Liam Griffiths	PTS	4	29 Mar 2014	(United Kingdom) Winter Gardens, Blackpool, England	
4	Win	4–0	(United Kingdom) Max Maxwell	PTS	4	14 Dec 2013	(United Kingdom) Robin Park Centre, Wigan, England	
3	Win	3–0	(United Kingdom) Dee Mitchell	PTS	4	15 Nov 2013	(United Kingdom) Winter Gardens, Blackpool, England	
2	Win	2–0	(United Kingdom) James Smith	RTD	1 (4), 3:00	21 Jan 2012	(United Kingdom) Liverpool Olympia, Liverpool, England	
1	Win	1–0	(United Kingdom) Kevin McCauley	PTS	4	3 Dec 2011	(United Kingdom) Robin Park Centre, Wigan, England	
