= Ted Cheeseman =

English boxer

Personal information
- Nickname: The Big Cheese
- Nationality: British
- Born: 20 August 1995 (age 30) London, England
- Height: 5 ft 10 in (178 cm)
- Weight: Light-middleweight

Boxing career
- Stance: Orthodox

Boxing record
- Total fights: 21
- Wins: 17
- Win by KO: 10
- Losses: 3
- Draws: 1

Ted Cheeseman (born 20 August 1995) is a retired British professional boxer. He was a 2 x time British light-middleweight champion, having held the title from March 2021 to October 2021 and previously from 2018 to 2019. He also challenged once for the European light-middleweight title in 2019.

== Professional boxing record ==
21 fights	17 wins	3 losses
By knockout	10	1
By decision	6	2
By disqualification	1	0
Draws	1	

No.	Result	Record	Opponent	Type	Round, time	Date	Location	Notes
21	Loss	17–3–1	Troy Williamson	KO	10 (12), 0:50	9 Oct 2021	Liverpool Arena, Liverpool, England	Lost British light-middleweight title
20	Win	17–2–1	James Metcalf	TKO	11 (12), 3:10	27 Mar 2021	Europa Point Sports Complex, Gibraltar	Won vacant British light-middleweight title
19	Win	16–2–1	Sam Eggington	UD	12	1 Aug 2020	Matchroom Fight Camp, Brentwood, England	Won IBF International light-middleweight title
18	Loss	15–2–1	Scott Fitzgerald	UD	12	19 Oct 2019	Utilita Arena, Newcastle, England	Lost British light-middleweight title
17	Draw	15–1–1	Kieron Conway	SD	12	21 Jun 2019	York Hall, London, England	Retained British light-middleweight title
16	Loss	15–1	Sergio García	UD	12	2 Feb 2019	The O2 Arena, London, England	For European light-middleweight title
15	Win	15–0	Asinia Byfield	UD	12	27 Oct 2018	Copper Box Arena, London, England	Won vacant British light-middleweight title
14	Win	14–0	Paul Upton	TKO	4 (12), 2:45	6 Jun 2018	York Hall, London, England	Retained WBA International light-middleweight title
13	Win	13–0	Carson Jones	UD	10	3 Feb 2018	The O2 Arena, London, England	Won vacant WBA International light-middleweight title
12	Win	12–0	Tony Dixon	PTS	8	13 Dec 2017	York Hall, London, England	
11	Win	11–0	Aristides Quintero	KO	5 (8), 2:51	13 Oct 2017	York Hall, London, England	
10	Win	10–0	Francesco Lezzi	DQ	3 (8), 1:30	1 Sep 2017	York Hall, London, England	Lezzi disqualified for pushing the referee
9	Win	9–0	Matthew Ryan	TKO	3 (10), 1:22	1 Jul 2017	The O2 Arena, London, England	Won English light-middleweight title
8	Win	8–0	Jack Sellars	PTS	8	4 Mar 2017	The O2 Arena, London, England	
7	Win	7–0	Lloyd Ellett	TKO	2 (10), 1:36	26 Nov 2016	Wembley Arena, London, England	
6	Win	6–0	Chris Jenkinson	KO	5 (6), 1:58	29 Sep 2016	York Hall, London, England	
5	Win	5–0	Danny Little	TKO	5 (6), 1:03	25 Jun 2016	The O2 Arena, London, England	
4	Win	4–0	Mario Petrov	TKO	4 (6), 1:26	9 Apr 2016	The O2 Arena, London, England	
3	Win	3–0	Gergo Vari	TKO	4 (6) 2:22	30 Jan 2016	Copper Box Arena, London, England	
2	Win	2–0	Victor Edagha	PTS	4	10 Oct 2015	York Hall, London, England	
1	Win	1–0	Gabor Ambrus	TKO	2 (4), 0:54	12 Sep 2015	The O2 Arena, London, England	
