= Jason Welborn =

English boxer (born 1986)

Personal information
- Nationality: English
- Born: 9 May 1986 (age 40) Rowley Regis, West Midlands, England
- Weight: Welterweight; Light-middleweight; Middleweight

Boxing career
- Stance: Orthodox

Boxing record
- Total fights: 33
- Wins: 24
- Win by KO: 7
- Losses: 9

Jason Welborn (born 9 May 1986) is an English professional boxer who challenged once for the unified WBA (Super), IBF and IBO light-middleweight titles in 2018. At national level, he held the British middleweight title in 2018, and challenged for the British welterweight and light middleweight titles in 2013 and 2014 respectively, and the Commonwealth light-middleweight and middleweight titles in 2019 and 2020 respectively. His networth is not public however it is estimated to be around £150,000 to £350,000.

== Professional career ==
=== Welborn vs. Ambler ===
Welborn made his professional debut on 12 December 2005, scoring a first-round technical knockout (TKO) victory over Jamie Ambler at the Holiday Inn, Birmingham.

=== Welborn vs. Booth ===
On 27 February 2006, Welborn lost his second professional fight by third-round knockout (KO) to Tyan Booth.

=== Welborn vs. Gavin ===
On 18 January 2013, after going on a ten fight winning streak, he faced undefeated British welterweight champion Frankie Gavin at the Walsall Town Hall in Walsall, losing via seventh-round TKO.

=== Welborn vs. Smith ===
Five fights later, after moving up in weight, he challenged undefeated British light-middleweight champion Liam Smith on 26 July 2014 at the Phones 4u Arena in Manchester. Welborn lost the fight by sixth-round KO.

=== Welborn vs. Macklin ===
On 17 October 2015, Welborn lost a ten-round unanimous decision (UD) for the vacant WBC International light-middleweight title against former British and European middleweight champion Matthew Macklin at the Barclaycard Arena in Birmingham. Two judges scored the bout 96–94 while the third scored it 97–93.

=== Welbron vs. Morrison ===
On 25 March 2017, Welborn beat undefeated prospect Marcus Morrison by UD over ten rounds to capture the WBC International Silver middleweight title at the Manchester Arena, Manchester, with two judges scoring the bout 96–93 and the third scoring it 97–92.

=== Welborn vs. Langford ===
He made a third attempt at a British title on 4 May 2018, against Tommy Langford at the Walsall Town Hall. Welborn won via split decision (SD) over twelve rounds to capture Langford's British middleweight title. Two judges scored the bout 114–113 to Welborn, while the third scored it 115–113 in favour of Langford.

=== Welborn vs. Langford II ===
He defended his British middleweight title on 8 September 2018 in a rematch against Tommy Langford at Arena Birmingham. Welborn retained the title with another split decision victory, with the scorecards reading 115–114, 114–113 and 113–114.

=== Welborn vs. Hurd ===
On 1 December 2018, Welborn, ranked #11 by the WBA at super welterweight, faced undefeated unified light-middleweight champion Jarrett Hurd for the WBA (Super), IBF, and IBO titles at the Staples Center in Los Angeles, California, losing via fourth-round KO. Welborn started the fight as the aggressor, pressuring the champion on the front foot throughout the first round which saw Hurd being defensive, taking clean punches and a solid right hand. The second round saw Hurd pick up the pace, with Welborn still out working the champion. The third round was much of the same, with Welborn backing Hurd up against the ropes. In the fourth, Welborn started fast as he did in the previous rounds, once again backing Hurd up against the ropes. Untroubled by Welborn's power, Hurd took the centre of the ring and began to throw heavy punches, ending with an accurate shot to the body that put Welborn down. He managed to get to his feet at the count of ten but referee Lou Moret waved the fight off.

=== Welborn vs. Metcalf ===
Welborn next challenged James Metcalf on 15 June 2019 for the vacant Commonwealth light-middleweight title at the First Direct Arena in Leeds, losing via eighth-round KO.

=== Welborn vs. Cash ===
In his next bout, Welborn fought Felix Cash for his Commonwealth middleweight title. Cash dropped Welborn twice in the fifth round before Welborn's corner threw decided to throw in the towel.

== Professional boxing record ==
33 fights	24 wins	9 losses
By knockout	7	6
By decision	17	3

No.	Result	Record	Opponent	Type	Round, time	Date	Location	Notes
33	Loss	24–9	Felix Cash	TKO	5 (12), 2:48	14 Aug 2020	Matchroom Fight Camp, Brentwood, England	For Commonwealth middleweight title
32	Loss	24–8	James Metcalf	TKO	8 (12), 2:25	15 Jun 2019	First Direct Arena, Leeds, England	For vacant Commonwealth light-middleweight title
31	Loss	24–7	Jarrett Hurd	KO	4 (12), 1:55	1 Dec 2018	Staples Center, Los Angeles, California, US	For WBA (Super), IBF, and IBO light-middleweight titles
30	Win	24–6	Tommy Langford	SD	10	8 Sep 2018	Arena Birmingham, Birmingham, England	Retained British middleweight title
29	Win	23–6	Tommy Langford	SD	12	4 May 2018	Walsall Town Hall, Walsall, England	Won British middleweight title
28	Win	22–6	Christian Hoskin-Gomez	PTS	6	25 Nov 2017	Imperial Banqueting Suite, Bilston, England	
27	Win	21–6	Marcus Morrison	UD	10	25 Mar 2017	Manchester Arena, Manchester, England	Won WBC International Silver middleweight title
26	Win	20–6	Casey Blair	PTS	4	10 Dec 2016	Tudor Grange Leisure Centre, Solihull, England	
25	Loss	19–6	Craig Cunningham	PTS	10	16 Jul 2016	Playfootball Arena, Birmingham, England	Lost Midlands Area light-middleweight title
24	Loss	19–5	William Warburton	PTS	6	14 May 2016	Banks's Stadium, Walsall, England	
23	Win	19–4	Michal Vosyka	TKO	1 (6), 0:56	23 Apr 2016	The Deco, Northampton, England	
22	Win	18–4	Adam Jones	PTS	4	19 Mar 2016	Walsall Town Hall, Birmingham, England	
21	Loss	17–4	Matthew Macklin	UD	10	17 Oct 2015	Barclaycard Arena, Birmingham, England	For vacant WBC International light-middleweight title
20	Win	17–3	Ryan Aston	PTS	10	6 Jun 2015	Civic Hall, Wolverhampton, England	Retained Midlands Area light-middleweight title
19	Win	16–3	Dan Blackwell	PTS	4	25 Apr 2015	Walsall Town Hall, Walsall, England	
18	Loss	15–3	Liam Smith	KO	6 (12), 0:36	26 Jul 2014	Phones 4u Arena, Manchester, England	For British light-middleweight title
17	Win	15–2	Stanislav Nenkov	PTS	10	16 May 2014	Walsall Town Hall, Walsall, England	
16	Win	14–2	Terry Carruthers	TKO	8 (10), 0:52	19 Dec 2013	Arena Birmingham, Birmingham, England	Won Midlands Area light-middleweight title
15	Win	13–2	Max Maxwell	PTS	10	7 Sep 2013	Walsall Town Hall, Walsall, England	
14	Win	12–2	Tomasz Mazurkiewicz	PTS	6	29 Jun 2013	Digbeth Institute, Birmingham, England	
13	Loss	11–2	Frankie Gavin	TKO	7 (12), 2:35	18 Jan 2013	Walsall Town Hall, Walsall, England	For British welterweight title
12	Win	11–1	Jan Balog	PTS	10	30 Nov 2012	Civic Hall, Wolverhampton, England	
11	Win	10–1	Scott Haywood	RTD	5 (10), 3:00	22 Jun 2012	Civic Hall, Wolverhampton, England	Retained Midlands Area welterweight title
10	Win	9–1	James Finn	TKO	5 (10), 2:13	23 Mar 2012	Civic Hall, Wolverhampton, England	Retained Midlands Area welterweight title
9	Win	8–1	Sean McKervey	TKO	3 (10), 1:26	18 Nov 2011	Walsall Town Hall, Walsall, England	Won Midlands Area welterweight title
8	Win	7–1	Danny Donchev	PTS	4	23 Sep 2011	Tower Ballroom, Birmingham, England	
7	Win	6–1	Bheki Moyo	PTS	6	25 Jun 2011	Civic Hall, Bedworth, England	
6	Win	5–1	Rick Boulter	PTS	4	4 Jun 2011	Walsall Town Hall, Walsall, England	
5	Win	4–1	Chris Brophy	PTS	4	5 Sep 2010	Civic Hall, Wolverhampton, England	
4	Win	3–1	Kevin McCauley	PTS	4	24 Apr 2009	Civic Hall, Wolverhampton, England	
3	Win	2–1	Aldon Stewart	TKO	3 (6), 2:00	5 Dec 2006	Civic Hall, Wolverhampton, England	
2	Loss	1–1	Tyan Booth	KO	3 (6), 1:32	27 Feb 2006	Holiday Inn, Birmingham, England	
1	Win	1–0	Jamie Ambler	TKO	1 (6), 1:43	12 Dec 2005	Holiday Inn, Birmingham, England	

Sporting positions
Regional boxing titles
Preceded by Sean McKervey	Midlands Area welterweight champion 18 November 2011 – December 2012; Vacated	Vacant Title next held by Steven Pearce
Preceded by Terry Carruthers	Midlands Area light-middleweight champion 18 December 2013 – 16 July 2016	Succeeded by Craig Cunningham
Preceded by Marcus Morrison	WBC International Silver middleweight champion 25 March 2017 – April 2018; Vacated	Vacant Title next held by Felix Cash
Preceded by Tommy Langford	British middleweight champion 4 May 2018 – October 2018; Vacated	Vacant Title next held by Liam Williams
