= Gennady Golovkin vs. Kell Brook =

Boxing match

- Date: 10 September 2016
- Venue: The O2 Arena, Greenwich, London, UK
- Title(s) on the line: WBC, IBF and IBO middleweight titles

Tale of the tape
Boxer	Gennady Golovkin	Kell Brook
Nickname	"GGG"	"Special K"
Hometown	Karagandy, Karaganda, Kazakhstan	Sheffield, South Yorkshire, UK
Pre-fight record	35–0 (32 KO)	36–0 (25 KO)
Age	34 years, 5 months	30 years, 4 months
Height	5 ft 10 1/2 in (179 cm)	5 ft 9 in (175 cm)
Weight	158.9 lb (72 kg)	159.4 lb (72 kg)
Style	Orthodox	Orthodox
Recognition	WBA (Super), WBC, IBF, and IBO; Middleweight Champion; The Ring/TBRB; No. 1 Ranked Middleweight; The Ring No. 3 ranked pound-for-pound fighter	IBF; Welterweight Champion; The Ring; No. 1 Ranked Welterweight; TBRB; No. 10 Ranked Light Middleweight

Result
- Golovkin wins via 5th round TKO

Gennady Golovkin vs. Kell Brook, was a professional boxing match contested on 10 September 2016, for the WBC, IBF, and IBO middleweight championship.

The bout was held at the O2 Arena in London. The event was televised live on Sky Sports Box Office in the UK and HBO in the United States. Golovkin won the fight in round 5, after Brook's corner threw in the towel.

== Background ==
On 8 July 2016, it was announced that Gennady Golovkin would fight Kell Brook on 10 September 2016 at the O2 Arena in London, England. Brook was scheduled to fight in a unification bout against then-WBO champion Jessie Vargas, whereas there was negotiations for Golovkin to fight Chris Eubank Jr.; however, negotiations fell through and promoter Eddie Hearn offered the Golovkin fight to Brook, who agreed to move up two weight divisions to challenge Golovkin. This was Golovkin's 17th world title defence. The fight aired in the United States on HBO and on Sky Box Office pay-per-view in the United Kingdom.

On 5 September, the WBA withdrew its sanction for the fight. Although they granted Golovkin a special permit to take the fight, they stated that their title would not be at stake. The reason for the withdrawal was because Brook had never competed in the middleweight division. WBA president Gilberto Mendoza Jr. said, "What I most regret is that there are no boxers at 160 pounds who will fight against 'Triple G,' and Brook has to move up two divisions to fight against him." The Golovkin camp were said to be disappointed with the decision with promoter Tom Loeffler saying, "somehow the WBA thought it was too dangerous for a welterweight to move up to middleweight to fight the biggest puncher in boxing. I guess that is a compliment to GGG as they sanctioned [Adrien] Broner moving up two divisions [from lightweight to welterweight] to fight Paulie [Malignaggi in 2013] and Roy Jones moving up two divisions [from light heavyweight to heavyweight] to fight John Ruiz [in 2003] for WBA titles, and Kell Brook is undefeated and considered a top pound-for-pound boxer."

== The fight ==
Golovkin came out aggressively, going as far as to buckle Brook's legs in the first round. He was met with stiff resistance as Brook began to fire back, connecting multiple clean combinations on Golovkin, none of which were able to faze him. In the second round Brook had his greatest success of the fight, but in the process had his right eye socket broken. Over the next three rounds, Golovkin began to break him down. Brook showed courage, determination and a great chin as he absorbed the bulk of a Golovkin onslaught. Despite this, Brook's trainer Dominic Ingle threw in the towel to protect his fighter's damaged right eye, ending the fight in the fifth round with both boxers still standing.

At the time of the stoppage, Brook led 39–37 on one scorecard while the other two had the bout even at 38–38.

=== CompuBox stats ===
Total	Golovkin	Brook
Thrown	301	261
Landed	133	85
Con. %	44.2%	32.6%

== Aftermath ==
Speaking after the fight, Golovkin said, "I promised to bring 'Big Drama Show,' like street fight. I don't feel his power. I feel his distance. He has great distance. He feels [my power], and after second round I understand that it's not boxing. I need street fight. Just broke him. That's it."

Brook said, "I'm devastated. I expected him to be a bigger puncher. I think in the second round, he broke my eye socket. He caught me with a shot, and I was starting to settle into the fight, but I was seeing three or four of him, so it was hard to get through it. I was tricking him. His shots were coming underneath, and I was frustrating him. I was starting to settle into him, but when you see three or four of them, it is hard to carry on."

Speaking on the stoppage, Golovkin's trainer Abel Sanchez said, "The corner did the right thing. It was a matter of time. He was taking too many clean shots. At that point when they stopped it, it was over. Gennady knew it was over, and he was touching him with too many clean shots. I think something is wrong with [Brook's] eye, and the heavy hands were going to injure him permanently. I noticed it in the second round when he kept pointing to it and kept touching it. [Ingle] did say that something was wrong with his eye. But it wasn't so much with his eye as he was getting hit with too many clean shots. That could be very dangerous." He also stated that Golovkin was too eager to knock Brook out, "He was trying too hard to knock Kell out. The not smiling [Friday at the weigh-in], he had an hour and 40-minute ride [because of traffic]. He was upset and wanted to get on the scale and get out of here. He just was trying too hard. I was trying to tell him this is a 12-round fight. Just beat on him, beat on him, practice. I wanted him to use the jab more. He wasn't. He would use it for half the round and then not use it."

Golovkin stated although Brook fought like a true champion, he was not a middleweight.

== Undercard ==
Confirmed bouts:

Weight Class		vs.		Method	Round	Time	Notes
Middleweight	(Kazakhstan) Gennady Golovkin (c)	def.	(United Kingdom) Kell Brook	TKO	5 (12)	1:57	^{Note 1}
Bantamweight	(United Kingdom) Lee Haskins (c)	def.	(United Kingdom) Stuart Hall	UD	12	–	^{Note 2}
Super Middleweight	(United Kingdom) Callum Smith	def.	(Hungary) Norbert Nemesapati	RTD	7 (12)	3:00	^{Note 3}
Flyweight	(Philippines) Johnriel Casimero (c)	def.	(United Kingdom) Charlie Edwards	TKO	10 (12)	1:57	^{Note 4}
Super Featherweight	(United Kingdom) Martin Joseph Ward	def.	(United Kingdom) Andy Townend	TKO	8 (12)	0:54	^{Note 5}
Super Lightweight	(United Kingdom) Conor Benn	def.	(United Kingdom) Joe Ducker	KO	2 (4)	0:24
Super Middleweight	(United Kingdom) Paul Smith	def.	(Hungary) Daniel Regi	TKO	5 (6)	2:16
Float bouts
Middleweight	(United Kingdom) Craig Richards	def.	(United Kingdom) Dalton Miller	PTS	4	–
Preliminary bouts
Super Bantamweight	(United Kingdom) Gavin McDonnell	def.	(Nicaragua) Robin Zamora	PTS	8	–
Super Bantamweight	(United Kingdom) Kid Galahad	def.	(Italy) Emiliano Salvini	TKO	4 (8)	0:38

^Note 1 For WBC, IBF and IBO middleweight titles
^Note 2 For IBF Bantamweight title
^Note 3 For WBC Silver super middleweight title
^Note 4 For IBF flyweight title title
^Note 5 For vacant British super featherweight title

== Broadcasting ==
Country	Broadcaster
Australia	Fox Sports
Hungary	Sport 2
Ireland	Sky Sports
Latin America	Canal Space
Mexico	Azteca
New Zealand	SKY Arena
Panama	RPC Channel 4
Poland	Polsat
United Kingdom	Sky Sports
United States	HBO

=== Viewership ===
In the UK, the fight reportedly had 752,000 pay-per-view buys on Sky Box Office.

In the US, the fight was aired live on HBO in the afternoon and drew an average of 843,000 viewers and peaked at 907,000 viewers. This was considered by HBO to be very successful for an afternoon showing. A replay was shown later in the evening as part of the world super flyweight title fight between Roman Gonzalez and Carlos Cuadras. The replay averaged 593,000 viewers.

Preceded by vs. Dominic Wade	Gennady Golovkin's bouts 10 September 2016	Succeeded by vs. Daniel Jacobs
Preceded by vs. Kevin Bizier	Kell Brook's bouts 10 September 2016	Succeeded by vs. Errol Spence Jr.
