= Sam Sheedy =

English boxer (born 1988)

Personal information
- Nicknames: Speedy, Wisewood Mexican
- Nationality: English
- Born: 2 May 1988 (age 38)
- Height: 5 ft 11 in (180 cm)
- Weight: Middleweight

Boxing career
- Stance: Southpaw

Boxing record
- Total fights: 21
- Wins: 18
- Win by KO: 4
- Losses: 3

Sam Sheedy (born 2 May 1988) is an English former professional boxer. He held the Commonwealth middleweight title from April 2017 to October 2017.

== Career ==
Having taken up boxing aged 12, Sheedy made his professional debut at Don Valley Stadium in Sheffield on 12 September 2008, securing a win over Russell Pearce when his opponent retired on his stool at the end of the second of their scheduled six-round contest.

Unbeaten in his first six pro-fights, he stopped Jason Ball in the opening round at iceSheffield on 9 November 2012 to claim the Central Area middleweight title.

In his 16th paid bout, and still undefeated, Sheedy challenged English middleweight champion Navid Mansouri at the Magna Centre in Rotherham on 4 July 2015. He lost by split decision with one of the ringside judges scoring the fight 97–94 in his favour, while the other two had it 97–94 and 96–95 respectively for his opponent.

On 26 November 2016, he faced Tommy Langford for the vacant British middleweight title at Cardiff International Arena, once again losing via split decision with the judges scorecards reading 115–113, 113–117 and 114–116.

In his next outing, Sheedy became Commonwealth middleweight champion thanks to a unanimous decision win over Rasheed Abolaji in their bout for the vacant title at Bramall Lane in Sheffield on 28 April 2017.

He made the first defense of his title against Liam Cameron at Ponds Forge in Sheffield on 13 October 2017, losing by stoppage in the eighth round. Four days later, Sheedy announced his retirement from professional boxing stating he had "achieved a legacy in the sport" and "had enough of fighting."
