= Conor Benn =

British boxer (born 1996)

Personal information
- Nickname: The Destroyer
- Born: 28 September 1996 (age 30) Greenwich, London, England
- Height: 5 ft 8 in (173 cm)
- Weight: Welterweight; Light-Middleweight; Middleweight

Boxing career
- Reach: 70 in (178 cm)
- Stance: Orthodox

Boxing record
- Total fights: 27
- Wins: 25
- Win by KO: 14
- Losses: 2

Conor Nigel Benn (born 28 September 1996) is a British professional boxer. He has challenged once for the WBC welterweight title in September 2026. He is the son of former two-division world champion boxer Nigel Benn.

Benn's first fight against Chris Eubank Jr was named Fight of the Year by The Ring magazine, Boxing Writers Association of America, ESPN, BoxingScene, and CBS Sports.

== Early life ==
Benn was born in London, England. His father Nigel Benn is of Afro-Barbadian heritage. His mother Caroline (Jackson) Benn is of White English heritage. He moved to the Spanish island of Mallorca at four years of age and spent twelve years of his childhood living there with his family in a gated, eight-bedroom mansion with a pool, and had a Jacuzzi in his room. Despite this, his father taught him financial self-reliance by never giving him money; Benn said he supported himself by "doing painting and decorating in Spain for €20 a day ... from six to five". He also spent four years as a teenager living in Sydney, Australia where he began boxing for the first time and competed as an amateur training out of Vinegar Hill Boxing Club in Blacktown under Rod Williams, regularly sparring with the likes of future super-welterweight world title contender Nikita Tszyu and frequently fighting on the same card as future cruiserweight world champion Jai Opetaia. Following a successful amateur career in Australia that included 20 wins and 2 losses, Benn relocated to England at 19 years of age to live with Ricky Hatton and begin his professional boxing career.

== Professional career ==
=== Early career ===
Benn has been trained by Tony Sims since his professional debut, with his father, Nigel, having known and sparred with Tony since both of their respective boxing careers. He made his professional debut in April 2016 aged 19 at The O2 Arena in London defeating Bulgarian Ivailo Boyanov by technical knockout in the first round. He followed this with a points victory over Luke 'The Nuke' Keleher at The SSE Hydro in Glasgow in May, and a knockout of Lukas Radic in June On 10 September 2016, Benn was due to fight Silvije Kebet on the undercard of Gennady Golovkin vs. Kell Brook. After Silvije Kebet pulled out Benn defeated late replacement Joe Ducker by technical knockout in the second round to take his unbeaten record to 4–0. On 24 September, Benn fought his first ever six round fight and was taken the distance by Ross Jameson. Benn won a clear points decision. This also marked his first time fighting at the Manchester Arena, a venue his father fought at many times at world championship level. Benn was next due to fight at Wembley Arena in London on 26 November but pulled out four days earlier due to illness. On 1 December, it was announced that Benn would be part of the Anthony Joshua vs. Éric Molina heavyweight title undercard at the Manchester Arena on 10 December. His opponent was announced as Steven Backhouse. Benn scored two knockdowns in round 1 and won the fight via knockout. The first knockdown came just after the opening bell after a left hook. Blackhouse never recovered and the fight was stopped just over a minute into the round.

After a lay off, it was announced that Benn would return to the O2 Arena on 1 July 2017. Benn stopped Mike Cole after knocking him down following a left hook in round 3, recording his fifth stoppage victory. It was announced that Benn would appear on an edition of NXTGEN on Sky Sports on 1 September 2017 alongside Olympians Joshua Buatsi, Lawrence Okolie and Joe Cordina. Fighting at the York Hall for the first time in his career, Benn stopped previously unbeaten Kane Baker in round 2. It was said that Benn would next fight on Anthony Joshua's next world title defence on 28 October at the Principality Stadium in Cardiff. It was announced that Benn would return to the Manchester Arena on the undercard of Anthony Crolla vs. Ricky Burns on 7 October 2017. Benn remained undefeated knocking out Nathan Clarke in the first round. The fight lasted 2 minutes and 16 seconds. In the post fight, Benn spoke about how his improvement in the gym has helped him fight better in the ring. Promoter Eddie Hearn stated that Benn's next fight would be in the United States. Benn made his American debut on 11 November fighting Mexican boxer Brandon Sanudo at the Nassau Veterans Memorial Coliseum in Uniondale, New York. Benn scored his fifth consecutive knockout win, dropping Sanudo in round 2 with a left hook to the body. The fight was stopped by the referee after just 1 minute of round 2. Benn next fought at the York Hall in London on 13 December 2017 against French boxer Cedrick Peynaud. Benn was dropped twice in the opening round, which was also the first time he was knocked down as a professional. He beat the count both times and managed to drop Peynaud down in round 5 and 6. The fight went to the referee's scorecard, who had the fight 57–54 in favour of Benn, maintaining his unbeaten run.

In January 2018, the British Boxing Board of Control (BBBofC) set out some purse bids for their titles. One of the fights they ordered put Benn against Isaac MacLeod in an English welterweight title eliminator. They stated the fight must take place by June 2018. On 29 January 2018 it was announced that Benn would next fight on Amir Khan's UK return on 21 April at the Echo Arena in Liverpool, marking Benn's first fight in Merseyside. On 5 February, Benn signed a two-year extension with Matchroom. On the Khan-Lo Greco undercard, Benn defeated Chris Truman via round 4 TKO in the scheduled 6 round bout. Hearn later stated that Benn wanted to rematch Peynaud, likely for July 2018.

On 13 June, it was announced that Benn would fight Cedric Peynaud in a rematch on the undercard of Dillian Whyte vs. Joseph Parker on 28 July at The O2 Arena in London. The WBA announced the fight would be contested for their vacant Continental welterweight title. Benn dropped Peynaud three times, boxing his way to a 10-round unanimous decision victory. The three judges' scored the bout 98–90, 98–91, 97–90 in his favour. Peynaud started the fight swinging aiming to land big shots, however Benn used his feet to move around the ring and sensibly box. Peynaud managed to land clean shots on Benn, without doing too much damage. The first knockdown came in round 2, although it was clear that Peynaud lost balance and slipped to the canvas. In round 7, Peynaud took a knee following a hard body shot. A right hook dropped Peynaud down a third time in round 9. Benn was able to go the 10 round distance for the first time in his professional career.

=== Rise up the ranks ===
Benn would go on to defend his WBA Continental title multiple times: his first defence came against Finnish veteran Jussi Koivula at York Hall on 21 June 2019. Koivula started strongly in the first round, but Benn was able to catch him with a strong left hook in the second round, sending Koivula to the canvas, and winning by second-round technical knockout shortly afterwards.

His next fight against Belgian veteran Steve Jamoye on the undercard of Regis Prograis vs. Josh Taylor on 26 October 2019 also resulted in a technical knockout victory for Benn, this time in the fourth round. Benn had a point deducted in the fourth round for a low blow, shortly before he dropped and stopped Jamoye.

On 21 November 2020, Benn defeated former IBO welterweight champion Sebastian Formella by unanimous decision at the SSE Arena in Wembley, London. Benn was able to dominate the veteran over the course of 10 rounds. The three judges scored the bout 99–92, 99–91, and 100–91 for Benn. It was the second time in his professional career that Benn's fight went the ten round distance.

=== Career from 2021–2023 ===
==== Benn vs. Vargas ====
Benn returned to the ring on 10 April 2021 to face Samuel Vargas at the Copper Box Arena. Vargas, who had lasted seven rounds with undefeated Vergil Ortiz Jr. in his previous fight, was viewed by many as the toughest test of Benn's career so far. However, the fight lasted just 80 seconds, as Benn landed two right-left combinations which rocked Vargas, followed by a barrage of punches and a hard uppercut on the ropes that saw the bout stopped. In his post-fight interview, a fired-up Benn called out former unified light-welterweight champion Amir Khan, saying "Give me a proper test, give me Amir Khan. He's too busy messing about with reality shows." Khan had previously beaten Vargas by twelve-round unanimous decision in 2018, and was dismissive of the prospect of facing Benn, saying "At his [Benn's] age I was a world champ [sic]. Maybe if he had some belts that fight would make sense but he's got a long way to go yet".

==== Benn vs. Granados ====
On 14 June 2021, it was announced that Benn had signed a new five-year deal with Matchroom Sport, and that he would be facing Adrián Granados on 31 July as part of Fight Camp in Brentwood, Essex. However, the fight was postponed after Benn tested positive for COVID-19. On 14 August 2021, it was announced that the fight would take place on 4 September at Emerald Headingley Stadium in Leeds on the undercard of Mauricio Lara vs. Josh Warrington II.

On the night, Benn outworked and outboxed his opponent over the ten-round distance to earn a unanimous decision, with scores of 100–90, 99–91 and 97–93 in his favour. Granados had seemingly been content to just stay in the fight and make no real attempt at winning, and by the final round had become so passive that Benn shouted at him, dropping his hands and banging his legs in an invitation for Granados to stand and fight. Despite the convincing nature of his victory, he expressed annoyance at not stopping his opponent inside the distance, stating in his post-fight interview, "It was very frustrating, he was on his bike the whole fight. I thought he was going to stand toe to toe but I had to hunt him down."

==== Benn vs. Algieri ====
On 7 November 2021, it was announced that Benn would be facing former WBO junior welterweight champion Chris Algieri on 11 December at the M&S Bank Arena in Liverpool. He beat him inside 4 rounds to retain his title and move to 20–0.

==== Benn vs. van Heerden ====
On 9 March 2022, it was announced that Benn would face former IBO welterweight champion Chris van Heerden on 16 April 2022 at the AO Arena in Manchester, England. Benn dominated van Heerden en route to scoring a second-round TKO and retaining his title.

==== Cancelled fight with Eubank Jr. ====
On 5 October 2022, a statement was released from the BBBofC declaring that Chris Eubank Jr vs. Conor Benn is prohibited from taking place on Saturday 8 October after Benn tested positive for clomifene. Benn's promoters released a statement saying, "Benn has not been charged with any rule violation, he is not suspended, and he remains free to fight." Eubank's promoter also said the fight would go ahead as scheduled. The following day, the BBBofC confirmed that the fight had been postponed.

Benn voluntarily relinquished his boxing licence with the British Boxing Board of Control after he tested positive for the banned substance clomifene in two separate Voluntary Anti-Doping Association (VADA) tests.

=== Suspension ===
In March 2023, the UK Anti-Doping Agency formally charged and provisionally suspended Conor Benn for an Article 2.2 violation for the alleged use of a prohibited substance, after two voluntary drug tests came back positive on two occasions for clomifene, on 25 July 2022 and 1 September 2022 respectively, while in the build up to the subsequently cancelled bout against Chris Eubank Jr.

In July 2023, a ruling made by the NADP (National Anti-Doping Panel) saw his suspension lifted, clearing the way for him to fight again. However, UKAD and the BBBofC (British Boxing Board of Control) appealed the NADP ruling and his provisional suspension was reimposed on May 10, 2024.

On 6 November 2024, Benn had his provisional suspension lifted once again after an independent NADP panel ruled it was "not comfortably satisfied" that it had been proved he had committed an anti-doping rule violation.

UKAD stated that they would carefully review the panel's decision in accordance with its appeal rights under the UK Anti-Doping Rules. On 28 November 2024, UKAD and the BBBofC both announced they would not appeal.

=== Return to the ring ===
==== Benn vs. Orozco ====
On 23 September 2023, after 525 days out of the ring, Conor Benn fought his comeback fight in Orlando, Florida against the Mexican Rodolfo Orozco. He won the fight by unanimous decision, with the judges scoring it 99–91, 99–91 and 96–94.

==== Benn vs. Dobson ====
On 3 February 2024 in Las Vegas, Benn defeated Peter Dobson by unanimous decision after 12 rounds.

=== Career from 2025 ===
==== Benn vs. Eubank Jr. ====
In January 2025, Turki Alalshikh announced on X that Chris Eubank Jr. and Benn had accepted the fight which would take place at the Tottenham Hotspur Stadium scheduled for 26 April 2025. During the launch press conference when the two faced-off. Words were exchanged as Eubank got an egg from inside his coat and slapped it on the side of Benn's face. The two teams then had to be separated. Nigel Benn was also near Benn at the face-off and was seen grabbing Eubank by the throat. Further face-offs between the two were cancelled. In March, the BBBofC fined Eubank £100,000 for slapping the egg in Benn's face. According to them, the incident breached regulation 25 in relation to misconduct.

Eubank weighed in over the limit on his first attempt at 160.2 lbs, and on his second and final attempt, he recorded 160.05 pounds, exceeding the limit by just 0.05 lbs. Benn weighed in at a comfortable 156.4 pounds. For missing weight, Eubank was fined £375,000 (~$500,000), which was paid to Benn. The morning of the fight, Benn came in at 165 pounds and Eubank, who again, attended the weigh in late, weighed 169.4 pounds. Eubank entered the arena with his father Chris Eubank Sr, which was shown to the live audience, receiving positive reception. Billy Joe Saunders also tried to cause chaos outside Eubank's dressing room, clashing with Eubank's security, whilst getting his hands wrapped.

On the night, there was an announced crowd of 67,484 in attendance. The fight was dramatic, competitive, and physical as it went the 12-round distance. Eubank won via unanimous decision. Benn started aggressively, pressing early and landing significant shots, including a powerful eighth round where he hurt Eubank Jr. badly. However, Eubank Jr. gradually regained control with sharp jabs and precise punches, demonstrating superior stamina and experience. Both fighters engaged in an cutthroat final round, trading punches in non-stop action. Despite Benn's relentless pressure and power, Eubank Jr. showed resilience and tactical skill, out landing Benn in every round. All three judges agreed on a 116–112 scorecard for Eubank. After hearing the decision, Eubank fell to his knees and Benn looked distraught and sought comfort from his father. Speaking after the fight Benn said, “I felt like it was a close fight. I’ve got to watch it back. I stayed on the ropes maybe a bit too long. He worked harder towards the end. I'll have to watch it back but I enjoyed it.” According to CompuBox punch stats, Eubank landed 367 of 912 punches (40%) which was more than Benn who landed 215 of 593 (36%).

Eubank was taken to hospital as precaution and Benn attended the post-fight presser with Hearn. Benn claimed Eubank had a broken jaw. This was quickly confirmed to not be true by Eubank's promoter Ben Shalom. Eubank spent two nights in hospital and discharged on 28 April.

==== Benn vs. Eubank Jr. II ====
A day after the first meeting, Turki Alalshikh told reporters a rematch was likely to take place in September 2025, again at the Tottenham Hotspur Stadium in London. It was dependent on whether both boxers escaped the first fight uninjured and awaiting the 2025–26 Premier League fixtures, to confirm the stadium was available. Eubank's promoter Ben Shalom argued the rematch should not be at the 160 pound limit. He said, "The rehydration clause is probably less dangerous than the 160lb limit now at this stage in his career. That's where probably it's the biggest challenge. As the organisers of the event everyone has to be sensible as to how we approach the second fight. That probably was the one downer on the event, all the talk about the weight." On 29 June, Alalshikh announced the rematch was set and all terms were agreed for the rematch to take place on 20 September in London. On 6 August 2025, Ring Magazine announced that the rematch would occur on 15 November 2025, once more at the Tottenham Hotspur Stadium in London. It was also confirmed that SELA would serve as the lead promoter, with sponsorship from Ring Magazine and Riyadh Season. Hearn suggested Eubank would make the weight for the rematch without difficulty, due to his last several fights also being contested at the 160-pound limit. At the ceremonial weigh-in on 14 November 2025, a day before the fight, Benn weighed in at 159.3 lbs, heavier than Eubank's weight of 159.1 lbs.

Benn won the rematch via unanimous decision in a dominant performance, knocking Eubank down twice in the final round. The judges scored the bout 119–107, 116–110, and 118–108 all in favour of Benn. Unlike the first fight, which was highly competitive, the rematch was largely one-sided, with Benn dominating from the early rounds. Eubank, who was sluggish and subdued, lacked the same energy and explosiveness. Benn began aggressively, landing clean shots consistently, while Eubank attempted to counter. During the middle rounds, Eubank remained lethargic and struggled to vary his punches. Benn had continued success, landing notable right hands in rounds seven and nine. In the final found, the first knockdown occurred after a straight left, which sent Eubank stumbling. Eubank made it to his feet quickly and the second knockdown happened seconds later following a barrage of punches. Again, Eubank beat the count, with only seconds remaining in the fight, he acknowledged defeat.

Following the fight, Benn played down the chances of a trilogy fight, saying "This is the end of the Benn-Eubank saga. Over. Chris has twins coming and I have my boy, but this ends here". He also voiced his intention to drop back down to welterweight and challenge for a world title in that division. According to CompuBox, Benn was busier and accurate, landing 173 of 426 punches (40%), with 70 of them targeting the body. Eubank landed 68 of 365 (19%). Eubank averaged 6 punches landed per round, compared to the first fight where he averaged 31 punches.

=== Zuffa Boxing ===
On 20 February 2026, it was announced that Benn had left his longtime promoter Eddie Hearn's Matchroom Boxing and signed with Zuffa Boxing. The news generated significant interest and debate due to Benn's high profile and previous statements of loyalty to Matchroom.

==== Benn vs. Prograis ====
Benn defeated former two-time super-lightweight champion Regis Prograis at Tottenham Hotspur Stadium in London on 11 April 2026 as the co-main event of Tyson Fury vs. Arslanbek Makhmudov, broadcast on Netflix. The fight was contested at a 150 lb catchweight limit, with Benn weighing in at 149.5 lbs, and Prograis weighing in lighter at 148.1 lbs. Benn won by unanimous decision, with Prograis announcing his retirement from boxing after the fight.

==== Benn vs. Garcia ====
On July 16, 2026, it was officially announced that Benn would take on WBC welterweight champion Ryan Garcia on September 12, 2026, at the T-Mobile Arena in Las Vegas, Nevada. Garcia defeated Benn by 2nd round TKO.

== Personal life ==
He is married to his wife Victoria, who is a radio personality and model. They have 2 sons and a daughter.

Similar to his father, Benn is Christian. He has Christian iconography tattooed on his body, and has stated, "I trust in God, I trust in the process."

In addition to his native English, Benn is fluent in Spanish due to the time he spent living in Mallorca as a child.

Benn is a supporter of West Ham United F.C.

Conor Benn has a half-brother called Harley Benn, who is also a professional boxer and is four days older than Conor. Harley holds a 9–2 record.

== Outside boxing ==
Benn portrayed his father Nigel in the 2019 film Rise of the Footsoldier: Marbella and 2021 film Rise of the Footsoldier: Origins.

In July 2025, Benn was named as part of the series 7 line-up for Celebrity SAS: Who Dares Wins. He was forced to withdraw in the episode on 18 August 2025 because of a shoulder injury, although he wanted to continue.

In September 2025, Benn was featured in the Matchroom: The Greatest Showmen documentary.

== Professional boxing record ==
27 fights	25 wins	2 losses
By knockout	14	1
By decision	11	1

No.	Result	Record	Opponent	Type	Round, time	Date	Location	Notes
27	Loss	25–2	Ryan Garcia	TKO	2 (12), 1:25	12 Sep 2026	T-Mobile Arena, Paradise Nevada, U.S.	For WBC welterweight title
26	Win	25–1	Regis Prograis	UD	10	11 Apr 2026	Tottenham Hotspur Stadium, London, England	
25	Win	24–1	Chris Eubank Jr	UD	12	15 Nov 2025	Tottenham Hotspur Stadium, London, England	
24	Loss	23–1	Chris Eubank Jr	UD	12	26 Apr 2025	Tottenham Hotspur Stadium, London, England	
23	Win	23–0	Peter Dobson	UD	12	3 Feb 2024	Chelsea Ballroom, Paradise, Nevada, U.S.	
22	Win	22–0	Rodolfo Orozco	UD	10	23 Sep 2023	Caribe Royale, Orlando, Florida, U.S.	
21	Win	21–0	Chris van Heerden	TKO	2 (12), 1:55	16 Apr 2022	Manchester Arena, Manchester, England	Retained WBA Continental (Europe) welterweight title
20	Win	20–0	Chris Algieri	KO	4 (12), 2:58	11 Dec 2021	M&S Bank Arena, Liverpool, England	Retained WBA Continental (Europe) welterweight title
19	Win	19–0	Adrián Granados	UD	10	4 Sep 2021	Emerald Headingley Stadium, Leeds, England	Retained WBA Continental (Europe) welterweight title
18	Win	18–0	Samuel Vargas	TKO	1 (12), 1:20	10 Apr 2021	Copper Box Arena, London, England	Retained WBA Continental (Europe) welterweight title
17	Win	17–0	Sebastian Formella	UD	10	21 Nov 2020	The SSE Arena, London, England	Retained WBA Continental (Europe) welterweight title
16	Win	16–0	Steve Jamoye	TKO	4 (10), 2:18	26 Oct 2019	The O2 Arena, London, England	Retained WBA Continental (Europe) welterweight title
15	Win	15–0	Jussi Koivula	TKO	2 (10), 2:00	21 Jun 2019	York Hall, London, England	Retained WBA Continental (Europe) welterweight title
14	Win	14–0	Josef Zahradnik	PTS	8	20 Apr 2019	The O2 Arena, London, England	
13	Win	13–0	Cedrick Peynaud	UD	10	28 Jul 2018	The O2 Arena, London, England	Won vacant WBA Continental (Europe) welterweight title
12	Win	12–0	Chris Truman	TKO	4 (6), 1:17	21 Apr 2018	Echo Arena, Liverpool, England	
11	Win	11–0	Cedrick Peynaud	PTS	6	13 Dec 2017	York Hall, London, England	
10	Win	10–0	Brandon Sanudo	KO	2 (6), 1:00	11 Nov 2017	Nassau Veterans Memorial Coliseum, Uniondale, New York, U.S.	
9	Win	9–0	Nathan Clarke	TKO	1 (6), 2:16	7 Oct 2017	Manchester Arena, Manchester, England	
8	Win	8–0	Kane Baker	TKO	2 (6), 2:05	1 Sep 2017	York Hall, London, England	
7	Win	7–0	Mike Cole	TKO	3 (6), 0:42	1 Jul 2017	The O2 Arena, London, England	
6	Win	6–0	Steven Backhouse	TKO	1 (4), 1:06	10 Dec 2016	Manchester Arena, Manchester, England	
5	Win	5–0	Ross Jameson	PTS	6	24 Sep 2016	Manchester Arena, Manchester, England	
4	Win	4–0	Joe Ducker	KO	2 (4), 0:24	10 Sep 2016	The O2 Arena, London, England	
3	Win	3–0	Lukas Radic	KO	1 (4), 2:31	25 Jun 2016	The O2 Arena, London, England	
2	Win	2–0	Luke Keleher	PTS	4	28 May 2016	The SSE Hydro, Glasgow, Scotland	
1	Win	1–0	Ivailo Boyanov	TKO	1 (4), 2:07	9 Apr 2016	The O2 Arena, London, England	

== Pay-per-view bouts ==
Date	Fight	Billing	Pay-per-view buys	Network
26 April 2025	Eubank vs. Benn	Fatal Fury	620,000	Sky Sports Box Office & DAZN PPV
15 November 2025	Eubank vs Benn II	Unfinished Business		DAZN PPV

== Titles in boxing ==
- WBA continental welterweight champion (147 lbs)

== Awards ==
=== Awards Won ===
- 2025 The Ring Magazine Fight of the Year for Chris Eubank Jr vs. Conor Benn
- 2026 BBBofC Contest of the Year for Chris Eubank Jr vs. Conor Benn

=== Nominations ===
- 2025 The Ring Magazine Round of the Year for Chris Eubank Jr vs. Conor Benn ~ Round 12

== Legal Issues ==
=== Alleged use of a prohibited substance ===
Ahead of his scheduled bout with Chris Eubank Jr., in October 2022, Conor Benn returned adverse analytical findings for the prohibited substance clomifene in two separate tests conducted by the Voluntary Anti-Doping Association (VADA). Following the failed tests, the British Boxing Board of Control (BBBofC) prohibited the fight, and Benn subsequently surrendered his boxing license in the UK.

In April 2023, the UK Anti-Doping agency formally charged and provisionally suspended Benn for an Article 2.2 violation for the alleged use of a prohibited substance, after two voluntary drug tests came back positive on two occasions for clomifene, on 25 July 2022 and 1 September 2022 respectively, in the build up to the subsequently cancelled bout against Chris Eubank Jr. In July 2023, a ruling made by the NADP (National Anti-Doping Panel) saw his suspension lifted, clearing the way for him to fight again. However, UKAD and the BBBofC appealed the NADP ruling and his provisional suspension was reimposed on 10 May 2024.

On 6 November 2024, Benn had his provisional suspension lifted once again after an independent NADP panel ruled it was "not comfortably satisfied" that it had been proved he had committed an anti-doping rule violation. UKAD stated that they would carefully review the panel's decision in accordance with its appeal rights under the UK Anti-Doping Rules. On 28 November 2024, UKAD and the BBBofC both announced they would not appeal.

Sporting positions
Regional boxing titles
Vacant Title last held by Valentyn Golovko	WBA Continental (Europe) welterweight champion 28 July 2018 – November 2022; Vacated	Vacant Title next held by Paddy Donovan
