= Chris Eubank Jr =

British professional boxer (born 1989)

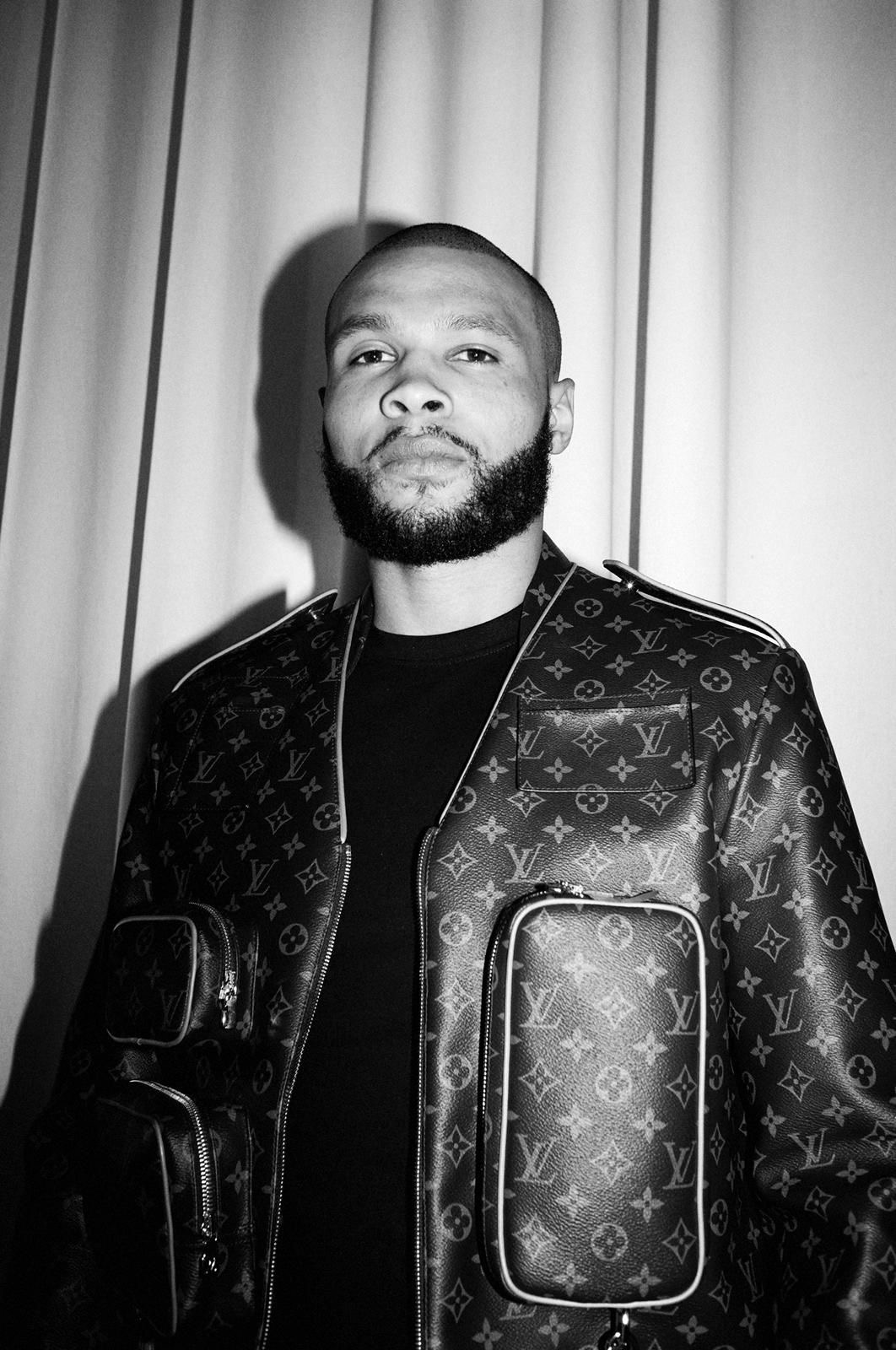
- Chris Eubank Jr in 2022

Personal information
- Nickname: Next Gen
- Born: Christopher Livingstone Eubank Jr; 18 September 1989 (age 37) Hove, East Sussex, England
- Height: 6 ft 0 in (183 cm)
- Weight: Middleweight; Super-middleweight

Boxing career
- Reach: 72 1/2 in (184 cm)
- Stance: Orthodox

Boxing record
- Total fights: 39
- Wins: 35
- Win by KO: 25
- Losses: 4

Christopher Livingstone Eubank Jr (born 18 September 1989) is a British professional boxer. He held the International Boxing Organization (IBO) middleweight title from 2024 to 2025. Previously, he held the World Boxing Association (WBA) interim middleweight title twice between 2015 and 2021. He also held the (IBO) super-middleweight title twice between 2017 and 2019. At regional level, he held the British middleweight title in 2016. He is the son of former two-division world champion boxer, Chris Eubank.

Eubank Jr's first meeting against Conor Benn was named Fight of the Year by The Ring magazine, Boxing Writers Association of America, ESPN, BoxingScene, and CBS Sports.

== Early life ==
Eubank Jr was born in Hove, East Sussex, the son of boxer Chris Eubank and Karron Suzanne Stephen-Martin. He was a pupil at Brighton College, Shoreham College for one year, and Spring Valley High School in Las Vegas for two years. Eubank featured alongside his father in the reality TV series At Home with the Eubanks.

At the age of 16, Eubank Jr and his brother Sebastian (1991–2021) moved to the United States to live with a guardian named Irene Hutton. It was explained by their mother Karron, as a paper adoption, as a means of gaining the two brothers dual citizenship without the need to marry, and to enhance their prospects of sporting careers.

== Amateur career ==
Eubank Jr started his amateur career in 2007. With the winning of his sixth amateur fight, he became the Amateur Golden Gloves Champion for the State of Nevada in his weight division of 165 lbs. With his eighth amateur fight he became the Amateur Golden Glove Champion for the Western States of the United States in his weight division. Eubank was 1–1 in the 2008 National Golden Gloves. He ended his amateur career with a record of 24–2.

== Professional career ==
=== Middleweight ===
==== Early career ====
Eubank Jr turned professional in 2011 and signed with promoter Mick Hennessy. He was mentored by his father, and trainer Ronnie Davies who also guided his father. Over the next three years, Eubank Jr amassed a record of 18–0 with 13 knockouts to his name.

On 19 February 2014, Eubank Jr signed a deal to appear on BoxNation, with his first fight being at the York Hall in London on 22 February. In his first fight on BoxNation Eubank Jr stopped Alistair Warren, after Warren retired on his stool before round four.

Eubank Jr next fought at the Copper Box Arena in London on 12 April against Sandor Micsko. Eubank landed a big uppercut in round two, which dropped Micsko. The referee waved the fight off. In the post-fight, Eubank said, "I'm the next generation. I worked on the uppercut in the gym and I connected beautifully tonight. When I connect with these guys I'm taking them out, no one can stand up to my power and I'll only get better and stronger. I'm ready for a title fight now."

On 10 May 2014, Eubank Jr defeated Robert Swierzbinkski at the Olympia in Liverpool, Eubank dropped Swierzbinkski (13–2, 3 KOs) seven times, stopping him in round seven. Eubank Jr fought Štěpán Horváth, at Newcastle Arena in Newcastle on 7 June 2014. Eubank dropped Horváth four times, stopping him in round six. This was Eubank's eighth straight stoppage win.

On the Saunders vs Blandamura undercard on 26 July at the Manchester Arena in Manchester, Eubank Jr stopped journeyman Ivan Jukić (19–2, 12 KOs) after 2 minutes and 40 seconds of the opening round.

Eubank Jr fought German Omar Siala at the Liverpool Arena on 25 October 2014 in an eight-round fight. Eubank Jr won the fight after a right uppercut knocked out Siala in the second round

==== Eubank vs Saunders ====
On 15 September 2014, Frank Warren announced that Eubank Jr would challenge unbeaten Billy Joe Saunders for the British, Commonwealth and European titles on the undercard of Derek Chisora vs Tyson Fury II on 9 November at the ExCeL arena. On 25 September 2014 the fight was postponed due to contractual issues. On 3 October the fight was confirmed, but would take place on 29 November instead and would also serve as a WBO final eliminator.

Eubank Jr lost his unbeaten record when he lost a split decision to Saunders. The bout went the distance, with the experienced Saunders controlling the first six rounds with his footwork, style and technical boxing ability, as Eubank Jr was mostly inactive. From round seven onward Eubank Jr was in control with a much higher punch output, this resulted in the two young boxers brawling and trading hard shots for the rest of the fight. In the twelfth round, Eubank Jr came out gunning for the knockout but was unable to get it. The early inactivity turned out to be the deciding factor as Saunders was victorious. One judge scored the bout 116–113 to Eubank Jr, while the other two judges scored it 115–114 and 115–113 in favour of Saunders.

==== Eubank vs Chudinov ====
On 30 December 2014, Frank Warren announced that Eubank Jr would fight undefeated WBA interim middleweight champion Dmitry Chudinov (14–0–2, 9 KOs), on 28 February 2015 at The O2 Arena in London on the undercard of Tyson Fury vs Christian Hammer. Eubank scored a twelfth-round TKO win over Chudinov. Eubank Jr at the time of stoppage, was ahead on all three judges scorecards 106–103, 108–101, 107–102. In round two, an accidental clash of heads caused a cut above Chudinov's left eye. Eubank Jr spent the rest of the fight landing power shot combinations and breaking Chudinov down. After the win, Eubank Jr sought a rematch with Saunders, "This result is redemption and I'm back. And I want that rematch, Billy Joe Saunders. I'm coming for you." Ultimately however, despite given multiple chances Eubank refused to sign the fight which would have earned him close to £1million.

After 2015 that was mostly inactive, Eubank Jr signed to promoter Eddie Hearn under the Matchroom Sport banner. Hearn is the son of Eubank Sr.'s former promoter Barry Hearn. Veteran trainer Adam Booth was added to the team to co-train Eubank.

==== Eubank vs Jeter ====
Eubank Jr's first fight after signing with Matchroom was a bout against Tony Jeter on 24 October 2017 where he defended his WBA interim middleweight champion. After knocking Jeter down in the first round, Eubank Jr knocked Jeter down twice in the second round before landing a flurry of combinations, forcing the referee to stop the fight.

Following the bout against Jeter, Eubank Jr was stripped of the interim WBA middleweight title due to his inactivity defending the title.

==== Eubank vs O'Sullivan ====
On 12 December 2015 Eubank Jr fought Gary O'Sullivan in an eliminator to challenge the WBA Regular middleweight champion, Daniel Jacobs at the O2 Arena in London on the undercard of Anthony Joshua vs Dillian Whyte. The bout was originally scheduled to take place in May 2015 The fight was well anticipated, as the pair had a history of feuds in the past, with O'Sullivan targeting Eubank on social media. The fight throughout had the pace set by Eubank Jr, O'Sullivan showed resilience to Eubank Jr's continuous hard uppercuts. At the end of the seventh round, O'Sullivan's corner retired their fighter, who had sustained a perforated eardrum.

==== Eubank vs Blackwell ====
In February 2016, Hennessy Sports announced a fight between Eubank Jr and Nick Blackwell (19–3–1, 8 KOs) for the British middleweight title would take place on 26 March at the Wembley Arena in London. Eubank Jr dominated the fight to the point that Eubank Sr. began imploring the referee to stop the fight. Following the eighth round, Eubank Sr. instructed Eubank Jr to stop hitting Blackwell in the head. The referee called a stop to the fight at 2:21 in the tenth round, and awarded Eubank Jr the win by TKO. Blackwell was taken to hospital with bleeding on the brain, and was placed in a medically induced coma for treatment, from which he was bought out one week later and retired from competitive boxing. The fight averaged 1.5 million viewers on Channel 5.

==== Eubank vs Doran ====
After re-signing with Matchroom Sport, it was announced on Sky Sports on 18 May 2016 that Eubank Jr would fight on the undercard of Anthony Joshua vs Dominic Breazeale at The O2 on 25 June 2016. Tom Doran was announced as Eubank Jr's opponent on 19 May 2016. Prior to the fight Eubank Jr was ranked number two by the WBA and number three by the WBC. Eubank Jr won via fourth-round TKO to retain the British Middleweight title. Doran was down once in the third round and three times in the fourth as the referee ended the fight. Eubank Jr called out Gennady Golovkin in a post-fight interview with Sky Sports.

==== Cancelled Langford fight ====
It was announced on 12 August 2016 that Eubank Jr would make a mandatory defence of his British middleweight title against undefeated Commonwealth and WBO Inter-Continental middleweight champion Tommy Langford after promoter Frank Warren won a purse bid to stage the fight. Eubank, however, relinquished the title in September after suffering an injury in sparring.

==== Proposed Golovkin fight ====
Throughout 2016, Eubank Jr made it clear that he wanted to challenge the undefeated unified middleweight champion Gennady Golovkin. The purse split for Eubank Jr was reported to be up to £6 million, Eubank Sr. wanted his son to earn a bigger share, due to the 'risk' of fighting a 'big puncher'. In July 2016, Golovkin was confirmed to have signed his end of the contract. On 8 July 2016, Eubank Jr was removed from the fight by promoter Eddie Hearn who offered the deal to then-IBF welterweight champion Kell Brook, who took the deal to fight Golovkin on 10 September 2016. Eubank Jr responded to being replaced by stating he "had never been presented with the fight contract." Boxers including Tommy Langford, Martin Murray, Curtis Stevens began calling out Eubank.

=== Super-middleweight ===
==== Eubank vs Quinlan ====
On 13 December 2016, Eubank Jr announced via his Facebook page that he would be making his debut in the super middleweight division, fighting Renold Quinlan (11–1, 7 KOs) for his IBO super-middleweight title. Quinlan won the then-vacant IBO title defeating former world champion Daniel Geale in October 2016 via knockout in round two. The date of the fight was confirmed to be 4 February 2017 with the venue being at the Lee Valley VeloPark, Olympic Park, in London.

Despite having not previously fought at super-middleweight, the December 2016 WBC super-middleweight ranking update had Eubank Jr at number seven, previously being number two at middleweight. On 6 January 2017, Quinlan threatened to walk away from the fight citing that in his opinion "there was little to no promotion, with the fight being only weeks away." he stated the build-up has not been enough to promote the biggest fight of his career, "It's only a few weeks away and I've got the feeling that it's going to be delayed. There's been no media around it and it's not getting the exposure it should be. I've been training well but I'm not 100 per cent focused now. I have a feeling it's going to get pulled." The fight went ahead as scheduled.

Eubank Jr stopped Quinlan in round ten in a fairly one-sided fight to win the IBO super-middleweight title. The fight was stopped by referee Howard John Foster, 2 minutes and 7 seconds of round ten after seeing Quinlan backed up against the ropes after being hit with continuous headshots. After a steady start, Eubank started taking control in the fifth round when he started using his speed advantage over Quinlan. After the fight was stopped, Eubank stood on the ropes in the corner in his trademark stance. In the post-fight interview, he gave credit to Quinlan, describing him as a tough fighter, "It was like hitting concrete. Big respect to Renold Quinlan. He flew halfway around the world to defend his title against one of the best in the world. He didn't have to do that." Eubank said that he was "comfortable making 160 and 168 pounds and wanted to fight Golovkin, Saunders or DeGale next".

==== Eubank vs Abraham ====
Reports suggested on 1 June 2017 that Eubank would make his ring return in July 2017 defending his IBO super middleweight title against former multiple-weight world champion Arthur Abraham (46–5, 30 KOs) in London. The two potential dates discussed were 15 and 22 July. At the time the fight was being discussed, Abraham was the mandatory challenger to the WBO super middleweight title, held by Gilberto Ramírez, who defeated Abraham in April 2015. On 5 June, it was confirmed that the fight would take place at the Wembley Arena in London on 15 July 2017. The official press announcement was scheduled to take place on 7 June. At the weigh in, Abraham weighed 12st 1lb 5oz, which was 1lb 13oz over the limit. He was given two hours to lose the extra weight. Eubank Jr weighed inside the limit at 11st 13lb 3oz. It was said that if Abraham couldn't make weight a second time, the fight would still take place in a non-title fight. Abraham made weight at the third attempt.

Eubank Jr won via a unanimous decision with the scorecards 120–108, 120–108 and 118–110. Eubank out-landed and outpointed Abraham. The previous time Eubank Jr went the twelve-round distance was his split decision loss to Saunders in November 2014, and the previous time he won a fight on points was on his eighth professional fight in December 2012. Eubank Jr landed heavy uppercuts throughout the fight, many single and some in combinations, with Abraham only managing to connect a few shots clean.

Eubank Jr spoke of Abraham's performance, "He's definitely the most durable opponent I've faced. I hit him with every shot in the book. He didn't win a round and I'm happy with the performance." With the win, Eubank Jr advanced into the World Boxing Super Series.

==== World Boxing Super Series ====
On 7 July 2017, Comosa AG, a joint venture between Sauerland Promotions and Richard Schaefer, announced the winner of Abraham and Eubank would be taking part in a super-middleweight knockout tournament called the 'World Boxing Super Series'.

===== Eubank vs Yıldırım =====
In Monte Carlo on 8 July 2017 Chris Eubank Sr., Eubank Jr picked undefeated Avni Yıldırım (16–0, 10 KOs) to face his son, as part of the tournament draft. The fight was confirmed following Eubank Jr's win over Abraham. Promoter Kalle Sauerland said official confirmation of a venue and date would be announced in the coming weeks. On 8 August 2017 it was announced that the fight would take place on 7 October at the Hanns-Martin-Schleyer-Halle in Stuttgart, Germany, marking it the second time Eubank would be fighting outside the UK since turning professional.

Eubank Jr used his hand speed and power shots to stop Yıldırım in round three of their fight to confirm his place in the semi-finals of the tournament. Yıldırım was forced to take a knee in the opening round when Eubank landed an uppercut. The fight came to an end after a flurry of shots, which were unanswered and the final punch was a left hook to the head which again dropped Yıldırım. Referee Leszek Jankowiak stopped the fight without counting, whilst Yıldırım attempted to get up. At ringside after the fight, Eubank Jr stated, "I am here to dominate this tournament. I am sending a message out there that I am coming." Eubank Jr landed 59 of 201 punches thrown (29%), whilst Yıldırım landed 23 of 91 thrown (25%). Before the fight, a brawl broke out in the crowd.

===== Eubank vs Groves =====
Due to winning their respective bouts in October 2017, Eubank Jr and George Groves (27–3, 20 KOs) were due to meet in the semi-final of the tournament. At first, promoter Kalle Sauerland stated he would try to book the fight for a stadium in either London or Manchester. In November 2017, ITV News reported the fight was set to take place on 17 February 2018 at the Manchester Arena in Manchester. The winner of the fight would earn his place in the final of the tournament and the WBA (Super) and IBO super-middleweight titles. Tickets for the fight sold out in seven minutes. Groves weighed 167 pounds, a full pound under the weight limit and Eubank came in at 167.5 pounds.

Groves secured his place in the final of the tournament after defeating Eubank Jr over twelve rounds. The judges scored the fight 117–112, 116–112 and 115–113 for Groves. Groves, the bigger man in the ring, used his jab to control the fight after a cagey round and mostly fought on the back foot, occasionally landing the big shot. An accidental clash of heads caused Eubank Jr to receive a cut on the side of his right eye in round three. The cut was dealt with by his corner after the round, but as the fight went on to the later rounds, blood was seen flowing from the wound. The fight had a high number of clinches and unclean punches from both boxers. Groves retained his WBA title. Groves also suffered a dislocated shoulder in round twelve. It was said that Groves weighed around 184 pounds on fight night.

After the fight, Groves said, "It was about who wanted it most, I think, and I obviously wanted it most. The jab was landing correctly all night. When he had success, it was because I did something wrong. He was strong, he was aggressive, but that obviously wasn't enough tonight." Eubank replied, "I thought it was close. I thought I did enough in the later rounds to win the fight, but it was a close fight. And all credit to George. You know, this is all part of boxing. You win some and you lose some. Hopefully we can get a rematch. It was enough of a good fight to have another one." Punch stats showed that Groves landed 117 of 398 punches thrown (29%) and Eubank landed 92 of his 421 thrown (22%). Many pundits and former boxers stated Eubank should move forward and hire a trainer. Both boxers earned a base purse of £1.5 million, which could increase due to sponsorship and PPV sales. Four days after the fight it was revealed that Groves did not fight for the IBO belt after failing to agree on sanctioning fees with the IBO's president Ed Levine.

On 9 May, Kalle Sauerland explained that Groves could potentially be replaced by Eubank Jr in the final of the tournament against Smith, however there would be confirmation on the final in the next ten days. Sauerland stated, "We're working at the moment on all the solutions and scenarios, where George [Groves] is fit and where he isn't. We're hopeful [Groves will be fit], so we'll see. You can't start the tournament and then have the final lingering into the next tournament. I'm sorry, that's not going to happen. We can push a month, but we can't push it back by three or four months. We have a substitute system. We said that from day one, and that's the situation. We want Groves in the final, but if that's not possible and he doesn't declare himself fit in the next 10 days, we have to find a solution."

==== Eubank vs McDonagh ====
On 17 September, Sauerland announced that Eubank Jr would fight JJ McDonagh on the George Groves vs Callum Smith undercard on 28 September at The Indoor Sports Hall at King Abdullah Sports City in Jeddah, Saudi Arabia. Eubank Jr won the fight via corner retirement. McDonagh chose to stay on his stool after round three, complaining of a shoulder injury. The crowd booed the stoppage. McDonagh was knocked down in the opening round from a left hand to the head. In round three, Eubank Jr began to land a lot of shots on McDonagh. McDonagh was willing to stand and trade with Eubank. The high work rate from Eubank Jr eventually backed McDonagh off. Eubank stated he "was not convinced McDonagh injured his shoulder and only took the fight on short notice for a payday." A fight nearly broke out when McDonagh heard Eubank Jr's comments.

==== Eubank vs DeGale ====
On 3 January 2019, an official press conference took place to announce that James DeGale vs Chris Eubank Jr would take place on 23 February 2019 at The O2 Arena in London. The rivalry between DeGale (25–2–1, 15 KOs) and Eubank began a few years earlier, after a series of run-ins, from sparring with one another in the gym to trading verbal insults across social media. Serious talks around the fight first began in July 2018 after DeGale vacated his IBF super-middleweight title. The fight was originally intended to take place in December 2018, but contract for the fight was not agreed. The possibility of the fight was first announced in November 2018.

Eubank said he had been training in Las Vegas at the Mayweather Boxing Club alongside former boxer Nate Vasquez. Eubank said, "Instead of me going through the motions and trying to beat guys using heart and determination. Now we have strategy involved. This is going to take me to the next level." International Boxing Organization president Ed Levine confirmed their super-middleweight title would be at stake. DeGale weighed 166 pounds while Eubank came in at 167 pounds. DeGale had doubts that Eubank and his new trainer would find success, predicting that Eubank would soon fall back into his old habits after a few rounds.

Eubank handed DeGale his third career loss in beating him via 12 round unanimous decision to win the vacant IBO super middleweight a second time. Eubank knocked DeGale down in rounds two and ten. In the eleventh, Eubank had a point deducted for using a professional wrestling body slam move of DeGale. DeGale suffered a cut on the right side of his eye in round 1. Eubank fought a controlled fight. He floored DeGale in a rough moment in the second. He landed a left hook against the ropes and dropped him moments later with a strong right that sent DeGale to the canvas. In the tenth round, Eubank delivered a powerful left hook that sent DeGale to the canvas once again, just 30 seconds before the end of the round. DeGale tried to clinch to avoid the knockdown, but his hand touched the canvas. The judges scored it 114–112, 115–112, and 117–109. In the post-fight, Eubank said, "I'm back where I need to be, on top of the food chain. And now I'm coming for all the other belts in the super middleweight division." DeGale stated he would contemplate retirement.

Soon after the fight, Eubank expressed a desire to contend for a world title, whether in the middleweight or super middleweight division, asserting that he could still comfortably make the weight. His father Eubank Sr. wanted him to return to middleweight.

=== Return to middleweight ===
==== Eubank vs Korobov ====
In October 2019, Eubank's return to the middleweight division was confirmed and his next fight was scheduled for 7 December 2019. Eubank was number 1 ranked by the WBA. His opponent was number 3 ranked, 36 year old Matt Korobov (28–2–1, 14 KOs), who was coming off a draw against Immanuwel Aleem, for the vacant WBA interim middleweight title. Korobov was known to be a skilled southpaw with a strong amateur pedigree, having represented Russia in the Olympics. The fight was to be aired live on Showtime at the Barclays Center in Brooklyn, New York, on the undercard of Jermall Charlo's world title defence against Dennis Hogan. The event marked Eubank's first appearance in the United States, with plans for him to eventually go head-to-head against Charlo. Korobov was eager for a rematch with Charlo, following his defeat to him in December 2018 when he stepped in as a late replacement. Eubank vowed to become the second man to stop Korobov, something Charlo was not able to do. Fighting at middleweight for the first time in 3½ years, Eubank weighed 159¼ pounds and Korobov weighed 159 pounds.

The fight ended in an anticlimactic fashion when Korobov suffered a shoulder injury just 34 seconds into the second round, resulting in a TKO win for Eubank. Korobov got off to a strong start. However, due to the self-inflicted injury, he could not continue, and the referee awarded Eubank with a second-round TKO win, awarding him the vacant belt. After the fight, Eubank stated he was just warming up in the fight when it was stopped and it was not how he wanted his stateside debut to end.

After the Korobov fight, Eubank was inactive in the ring. In the Summer of 2020, he began to pursue a high-profile bout with unified super-middleweight champion Canelo Álvarez. However, negotiations broke down over financial terms and Eubank's ring readiness, as he felt he had been out of the ring for a year and was not ready to face a fighter of Canelo's calibre without adequate preparation and momentum. Instead his rival Billy Joe Saunders received the opportunity to unify against Álvarez. Eubank kept a close eye on the fight, hoping to fight the winner. During the period of inactivity, Eubank continued to train and prioritizing recovery, and proper timing rather than rushing back.

==== Eubank vs Morrison ====
On 19 March 2021, Matchroom Boxing announced a blockbuster PPV card to take place at Manchester Arena in Manchester, headline by Derek Chisora vs Joseph Parker on 1 May, live on Sky Sports Box Office in the UK and DAZN in the US. The undercard was immediately including Eubank making his ring return after 17 months against Marcus Morrison (23–3, 16 KOs), who was on a 7-fight win streak. On the announcement, Eubank said, "This is a good fight for me. Since signing with Sauerland my camp has been firing on all cylinders, I've been training with Roy in Miami and focusing on improving my game. People have a lot to say about me and my career. There's talks about why fights haven't happened previously, but all I've been doing is focusing on number one, training hard and making sure I'm always ready. I'm now in the best place I can be and I'm ready to take what is mine." For Morrison, this was the biggest fight in his career to date. Eubank praised new trainer, former four-division world champion Roy Jones Jr for significantly enhancing his skills as a fighter, highlighting the numerous improvements gained from their extensive time training together. Morrison was confident that he had enough power in his punch to stop Eubank. Meanwhile, Eubank had already been discussing his upcoming potential matches. The fight was scheduled for 10 rounds at middleweight, however due to being a non-title fight, both boxers were permitted in coming in slightly over. Eubank weighed 161.7 pounds and Morrison stood on the scales at 161.5 pounds.

Eubank was victorious via unanimous decision, with all three judges' scorecards reading 98–92 in his favour. Eubank started cautiously, posturing and probing with jabs early on. He hurt Morrison multiple times, notably in the second round where he cornered him and delivered a flurry of powerful punches that left Morrison's nose bloodied. However, instead of seeking a knockout, Eubank Jr deliberately backed off, aiming to gain rounds. Eubank fought in bursts, exploding with sharp combinations and heavy hooks notably in rounds five, six, and seven. At these moments, Morrison was troubled and often on the ropes. Despite this, Eubank showed restraint, opting to box smartly rather than chasing a stoppage. Morrison proved resilient, continuously returning fire with counters and occasional strong punches, including a significant left hook in the ninth round that briefly staggered Eubank. Both traded punches in the tenth round, with Eubank finishing strong despite showing some signs of fatigue.

Post-fight, Eubank Jr reflected on the bout which had gone the full ten-round distance: "I had him [Morrison] hurt bad in the second round and probably could have ended the fight. But I wanted rounds. I wanted to use some of the stuff that Roy Jones has taught me. Experience the instructions he was giving me. If I see an opening, I usually take it. But I'm here to learn with a new coach. You can't get better by knocking a guy out in the second round. I decided to keep him in there. He's a tough kid." Morrison commended Eubank, highlighting his quickness and powerful punches. He also mentioned that he believed he earned Eubank's respect during the match.

On 24 June 2021, promoter Kalle Sauerland revealed that a significant announcement was coming soon. At this time, Eubank was still in line to challenge either Ryōta Murata (Super) or Erislandy Lara (Regular).

==== Eubank vs Awdijan ====
On 8 October 2021, Eubank was added to Boxxer card, headlined by Savannah Marshall at the Utilita Arena in Newcastle on 16 October. He was scheduled to fight Sven Elbir earlier in the month, who withdrew due to COVID, then German boxer Anatoli Muratov stepped in on short notice, however he was pulled from the card on medical grounds. His opponent was scheduled to be Armenian boxer Wanik Awdijan (28–1, 11 KOs). During the final press conference, Eubank brought up the fact that Awdijan was very vocal online and now had nothing to say. He replied, "Just wait." Eubank said he would not underestimate his opponent, but teach him a lesson for his social media posts. His shorts and ring-walk robe were adorned by the name of Sebastian, his brother who had died in July 2021. Eubank won the fight via corner retirement after the fifth round. It was suspected that Awdijan had broken his rib from a body shot.

==== Eubank vs Williams ====
On 18 October 2021, Eubank indicated that Welsh boxer Liam Williams (23–3–1, 18 KOs) was in pole position to be his next opponent. Williams had been actively vying for the opportunity to face Eubank in the ring. A deal was later finalized for their clash to take place on 11 December, to be broadcast live on Sky Sports from the Motorpoint Arena in Cardiff. Williams was now a free agent after his contract with Queensberry Promotions ended. Both fighters asserted their dominance as the best active British middleweight and exchanged barbs over the years. Williams criticized Eubank's collaboration with the Roy Jones Jr, suggesting that Eubank has shown no improvement during their time together. Due to Williams' provocative comments on Social Media, Eubank had cultivated a real animosity towards Williams. He told Sky Sports, "This is a personal fight for me. Most of the time, boxing is just business. You get in there, you fight another man and you just want to win." Williams was entering this fight on the back on a failed attempt to capture the WBO middleweight title against Demetrius Andrade. Williams also remarked that the reason the fight is being held in Wales is due to Eubank's inability to sell tickets and lack of a fanbase. Eubank was anticipating some hostility. Tickets for the event were selling quickly, with Ben Shalom anticipating a sell out crowd.

On 27 November, the fight was postponed to take place on 29 January 2022. The recurring shoulder injury that Williams suffered during his most recent fight was the cause of the delay. Medical professionals informed him that his condition could be managed without the need of surgery. On 8 December, it was reported that Williams had parted ways with Dominic Ingle, who had trained him since June 2018. Ingle clarified that there were no lingering grievances regarding the separation. Williams had been training in London with Adam Booth since November. The fight was again postponed as BBBofC cancelled all events in January, due to COVID. The main reason was due to lack of medical cover at events. The fight was rescheduled to a week later on 5 February 2022. During the press conference, Eubank mocked Williams' technical flaws, while Williams accused Eubank of relying on his famous surname. Eubank's trainer, Jones Jr, suggested Williams lacked the skill to handle Eubank's versatility. A rematch clause was inserted into the fight. During the fight week, Williams was recorded in an interview saying: "Eubank makes my skin crawl every time I look at him. I deeply dislike the guy. I want to kill him. I'm so up for this fight and ready to go." Robert Smith, of the BBBofC said he would call Williams in front of the board as this was not acceptable. In a statement, he said: "Those are not the words we want to hear, and even if he meant it metaphorically it is unacceptable for a licensed boxer to say such a thing. Boxers are more than aware of the dangers in the sport. We will be speaking with him about it after the contest. It's simply not appropriate." Eubank weighed in at 160 pounds, while Williams weighed 159 pounds.

Williams' home advantage ultimately did not pay off, as Eubank Jr produced a dominant display, dropping Williams four times, to emerge as the winner via wide unanimous decision, with judges' scorecards of 116–109, 116–108 and 117–109. In the first round, Eubank Jr sent Williams to the canvas with a jab. He scored another knockdown in the second round, this time knocking Williams down with a left hook. Williams was down yet again in the fourth round as a result of a slick Eubank Jr combination. Although Williams improved in the middle rounds, Eubank Jr scored a fourth knockdown in the eleventh round with a right hand, before showboating in the twelfth and final round to cement what had been a dominant performance. After the fight, Eubank stated that he intentionally extended the fight to "punish" Williams for his pre-fight remarks. He said, "I actually thought about it before I got in the ring and I was like 'I don't even want to knock this guy out in the first round, I want to punish him'. I want to get people like that out of boxing." Williams acknowledged Eubank's superiority in speed and precision, however contested the validity of one of the knockdowns. Eubank earned over £1 million for the fight.

During the post-fight press conference, Eubank spoke about his frustration surrounding Williams' roughhouse tactics, despite know beforehand that there would be dirty tactics involved. He was disappointed the referee did not take a point off. He said at one point in the fight, Williams put Eubank in a headlock and pushed his glove near Eubank's face. In response to this, Eubank, frustrated, bit Williams' glove.

==== Cancelled bout with Conor Benn ====
In 2022, Eubank Jr announced he would face Conor Benn at a catchweight of 157lbs. This fight has been marketed as a grudge match of sorts, considering the fathers of both boxers, Chris Eubank and Nigel Benn, maintained a fierce rivalry throughout the early-mid '90s, culminating in two fights: a TKO victory for Eubank during their first meeting in 1990, and a draw three years later in their second fight.

The fight was scheduled to take place on 8 October 2022 at London's O2 Arena. Eubank Jr later admitted in an interview that he was struggling to reach the required 157lbs weight limit, which proved to be cause for worry with his father, who threatened to pull him out of the fight. Eubank Jr has also stated that if he did lose the fight, he would retire.

On 5 October 2022, a statement was released from the British Boxing Board of Control declaring the fight was prohibited from taking place on after Benn tested positive for clomifene. Benn's promoters, Matchroom Sport, released a statement saying, "Benn has not been charged with any rule violation, he is not suspended, and he remains free to fight." Despite Eubank's promoter also saying the fight will go ahead as scheduled, it was officially postponed.

==== Eubank vs Smith ====
Prior to the fight with Benn being announced, a fight between Eubank and Liam Smith was first discussed by Ben Shalom in June 2022. Shalom believed Eubank should be challenging for world titles. Eubank had one fight left on his contract with Boxxer and Sky Sports. In November, negotiations began, targeting a fight for December. On 24 November, the fight was made official to take place at the AO Arena in Manchester on 21 January 2023, with the event being broadcast live on Sky Sports Box Office in UK and DAZN in the United States. Smith (32–3–1, 19 KOs) was entering the contest in outstanding form, having secured victories against notable opponents such as Jesse Vargas, Anthony Fowler, and Roberto Garcia. Eubank was enthusiastic about returning to the ring after his planned bout with Benn was postponed in October 2022. In the lead-up to the fight, Chris Eubank made headlines by claiming he only needed to perform at 50% capacity to secure a victory against Smith. Smith dismissed Eubank's remarks, suggesting he may as well not turn up at 50%. Eubank also noted that he had only sparred for eight rounds, reasoning that he anticipated the match wouldn't extend beyond that.

Tensions soared at the final press conference as the two boxers exchanged barbs. The confrontation escalated when Smith made a pointed remark, accusing Eubank of rarely being seen in the company of women. Homophobic remarks were made and accusations of Smith cheating on his wife. Following the press conference, both boxers issued apologies for their remarks. Reports indicated that the British Boxing Board of Control (BBBofC) may pursue misconduct charges against Smith in light of his statements. On 17 April 2023, the BBBofC ruled both individuals guilty of misconduct and imposed undisclosed fines on them. Both boxers weighed the same 159 pounds. There was little drama to add at the weigh in following the final press conference. Eubank was a 3–1 favourite over Smith.

Smith scored a fourth-round knockout against Eubank. Eubank had been in control for the first three rounds but faced a dramatic shift in the fourth, where he was hurt and sent to the canvas twice. After the first knockdown, Eubank appeared unsteady, struggling to regain his footing. As the fight continued, Smith seized the opportunity, unleashing power shots that caught a dazed Eubank off guard, resulting in a second knockdown. It was at this point that the referee stepped in, stopping the contest. Even with the hostility leading up to the fight, Eubank congratulated Smith on the win. He said, "Big congratulations to him. I felt like I had him going but he caught me with a great shot. If the fans want to see a rematch, we can get it on at Anfield." Smith expressed his willingness to have a rematch but emphasized that he wanted it to be under his conditions. Through the four rounds, Eubank landed 26 of 147 punches thrown (17.7%) and Smith landed 27 of his 113 thrown (23.9%).

Kalle Sauerland, promoter for Eubank, acknowledged that he had no explanations for Smith's surprising knockout of Eubank. He explained the weight was not a factor and Eubank voluntarily weighed 159 pounds. The next steps were for the team to sit down and analyse if the rematch clause would be activated.

==== Eubank vs Smith II ====
On 14 February 2023, Eubank activated the rematch clause. On 25 April, the rematch was formally announced to take place on 17 June at the AO Arena in Manchester on Sky Sports Box Office in the UK and ESPN+ in the US. On the rematch being signed, Eubank said, "Liam had the night of his life against me in January, the stars aligned for him in Manchester, and he went away with a big win. But lightning doesn't strike twice. If he even has the slightest thought that he can beat me again, then great, because it will be his undoing." Smith said, "I know he tried his best to go a different route but the fight is on now and I am looking forward to hearing what he has to say for himself in the build up. Let's see what angle he comes with this time. He can't come with angles about how he's never been hurt, he's never been dropped, he's never been stopped, because he just had all three of those things happen to him in one night and it was me who did it to him. I'm also interested to see where he goes after I beat him again on June 17th." On 8 May, reports emerged indicating that Smith sustained a minor back injury during training camp, resulting in the postponement of the fight. The following day, the match was promptly rescheduled for 1 July 2023. On 24 May, the fight was postponed again after Smith cited persistent injuries that impacted his training camp. By July, Smith was fully fit again and the fight was again rescheduled for 2 September 2023. Eubank enlisted Brian "Bomac" McIntyre as his trainer for the rematch, replacing Roy Jones Jr. Eubank weighed 159.3 pounds while Smith weighed on the 160 pounds limit.

Eubank employed a punch-and-grab technique to gradually wear down Smith, dropping him twice which led to a stoppage in the tenth round, gaining revenge. Eubank sent Smith to the canvas with a powerful uppercut in the fourth round and put him in a tough spot in the fifth, unleashing a series of punches while Smith was cornered against the ropes. By the ninth round, Smith seemed visibly fatigued and appeared to be struggling with an injury to his right ankle. In the tenth round, Eubank sent Smith to the canvas once more before ultimately halting the fight just moments later with a flurry of unanswered blows. The bout was called off at 1:45 of round ten. Following the stoppage, a triumphant Eubank gazed into the crowd, directing his attention towards retired boxer Kell Brook, signalling his desire for a showdown with him in the near future. He also called out Conor Benn and Gennady Golovkin.

Smith attributed his physical condition to the significant weight loss he underwent in preparation for the rematch. However, he still praised Eubank stating, "I was flat from the start; the weight killed me after the injury. I was just flat from the get-go and Chris was sharp, that's all I can say about it really. Chris was the better man tonight, I shout when I win and I'll take my defeat when I lose." CompuBox stats shows that Eubank landed 193 of 580 punches thrown (33.3%), nearly six times more than Smith, who landed 33 of his 132 thrown (25%).

==== Signing with Boxxer ====
In July 2024 it was announced Eubank Jr had signed a promotional deal with Boxxer having become a free agent following the end of his association with Wasserman Boxing. On signing Eubank, Ben Shalom stated: "Chris Eubank Jr is undoubtedly one of the biggest star attractions in boxing. He brings excitement and intrigue wherever he goes. Boxxer is his natural home and I'm incredibly excited to work with Chris to make sure we fully realise his huge potential and fierce ambition. We've had the privilege of working with Chris on some massive fight nights in the U.K. and there will be plenty more to come in the U.K. and worldwide. He is a bonafide pay-per-view star. The hunger and ambition is there. We can't wait to see him back in action and involved in some massive fights." Eubank called it more of a partnership. He said, "I'm very excited to have signed with Boxxer and Ben Shalom. They fit the direction I want to go in. We have big plans over the next 12 to 24 months. There are big fights in the pipeline and these guys can make it happen. This is a partnership. I have the freedom and the leeway to work how I want to work, which is very rare. I'm in a position of power. I'm in a position to really control the direction that I want to go in so I'm excited."

==== Eubank vs Szeremeta ====
By August 2024, Eubank expressed frustration with his limited activity in the ring. Eager to step up his bouts over the coming year, he set his sights on a potential match against Canelo in May 2025, though he emphasized that he would not be hasty in making any decisions. On 20 August, it was announced on X that Eubank would appear on the Artur Beterbiev vs Dmitry Bivol PPV card against Kamil Szeremeta (25–2–2, 8 KOs) on 12 October 2024. The bout would mark Eubank's return to the ring after a 13-month hiatus. Frank Warren had anticipated a matchup between Eubank and his fighter Hamzah Sheeraz, who also voiced his disappointment over Eubank's decision to avoid the fight.

During the launch press conference in London in September, the undercard boxers expressed their admiration for Turki Alalshikh and the promoters present, particularly Frank Warren and Eddie Hearn. Following their remarks, Eubank had his say, having recently signed a deal with Boxxer. He said, "Why Boxxer? Because every other promoter out there is a scumbag." He then said Warren was "lying and cheating his way through boxing for the last couple of decade." Before switching to Matchroom, "Eddie Hearn, Frank Smith, they did everything to make this fight against Conor Benn ... Scumbags." He finished stating, "The only promoter that I know for sure isn't a scumbag is Turki Alalshikh. This is a man who isn't trying to take money from fighters, he isn't trying to use lawyers. He's a man of God, he's a man of religion. He just wants to put the best fights on and pay the fighters what they're worth and he's the first promoter in the history of boxing to be like this. And Ben Shalom is a pretty cool guy, too." Warren was offended by these remarks and tried to respond by asking Eubank why he did not fight Sheeraz. Warren later threatened to sue Eubank for his comments. Eubank subsequently issued an apology to Warren and Hearn following his outburst. Warren sued Eubank for slander and libel related to defamatory statements he made. On 4 April 2025, the High Court encouraged mediation as a preferable route to resolve the dispute. On 19 May 2025, both parties announced that the defamation proceedings had been "settled amicably." A joint statement emphasized that with the legal dispute resolved, they were eager to uphold a constructive and professional relationship moving forward.

Eubank hired Johnathon Banks as his trainer moving forward. Discussing the new partnership, he said, "I like Johnathon Banks' philosophy, his mind set, and his teaching. I like everything that he says and the things that he does in training." Conor Benn was also present during fight week and a day before the fight, the two had to be pulled apart after nearly coming to blows. Both Eubank and Szeremeta weighed in at 159.1 pounds.

The fight was contested for the IBO middleweight championship. Eubank defeated Szeremeta by TKO in the seventh round. Eubank dominated the fight, dropping Szeremeta once in the first and sixth rounds and twice in the seventh round. The referee stopped the fight at 1:50 into the round. He used an aggressive style, consistent pressure, and wore down Szeremeta over the rounds. It was a body shot that ended the fight. Conor Benn was present at ringside, entering the ring after the fight and had a face-off with Eubank. Over the seven rounds, Eubank landed 127 of 312 punches thrown (40.7%) and Szeremeta landed 78 of 224 thrown (34.8%). Eubank praised the influence of his new trainer, Banks, following his victory over Szeremeta. After the match, he remarked that he enjoyed himself throughout the night and could have ended the fight in the first round if he had chosen to do so.

==== Eubank vs Benn ====
In January 2025, Turki Alalshikh announced on X that Eubank and Conor Benn had accepted the fight which would take place at the Tottenham Hotspur Stadium scheduled for 26 April 2025. During the launch press conference when the two faced-off. Words were exchanged as Eubank got an egg from inside his coat and slapped it on the side of Benn's face. The two teams then had to be separated. Nigel Benn was also near Benn at the face-off and was seen grabbing Eubank by the throat. Further face-offs between the two were cancelled. In March, the BBBofC fined Eubank £100,000 for slapping the egg in Benn's face. According to them, the incident breached regulation 25 in relation to misconduct.

Eubank weighed in over the limit on his first attempt at 160.2 lbs, and on his second and final attempt, he recorded 160.05 pounds, exceeding the limit by just 0.05 lbs. Benn weighed in at a comfortable 156.4 pounds. For missing weight, Eubank was fined £375,000 (~$500,000), which was paid to Benn. The morning of the fight, Benn came in at 165 pounds and Eubank, who again, attended the weigh in late, weighed 169.4 pounds. Eubank entered the arena with his father Chris Eubank Sr, which was shown to the live audience, receiving positive reception. Billy Joe Saunders also tried to cause chaos outside Eubank's dressing room, clashing with Eubank's security, whilst getting his hands wrapped.

On the night, there was an announced crowd of 67,484 in attendance. The fight was dramatic, competitive, and physical as it went the 12-round distance. Eubank won via unanimous decision. Benn started aggressively, pressing early and landing significant shots, including a powerful eighth round where he hurt Eubank Jr badly. However, Eubank Jr gradually regained control with sharp jabs and precise punches, demonstrating superior stamina and experience. Both fighters engaged in an cutthroat final round, trading punches in non-stop action. Despite Benn's relentless pressure and power, Eubank Jr showed resilience and tactical skill, out landing Benn in every round. All three judges agreed on a 116–112 scorecard for Eubank. After hearing the decision, Eubank fell to his knees and Benn looked distraught and sought comfort from his father. Speaking after the fight Eubank said, "I didn't think he'd be the guy to bring it out of me like that, but the fact that our fathers did what they did all those years ago, it brings out a different soul and a different spirit to you. And that's what we both showed here. I pushed through. There's a lot of things that have been going on in my life that I'm not going to go into. But I'm happy to have this man [his father] back in my life. We've upheld the family name like we said we were going to do, and onwards and upwards." According to CompuBox punch stats, Eubank landed 367 of 912 punches (40%) which was more than Benn who landed 215 of 593 (36%).

Eubank was taken to hospital as precaution and Benn attended the post-fight presser with Hearn. Benn claimed Eubank had a broken jaw. This was quickly confirmed to not be true by Eubank's promoter Ben Shalom. Eubank spent two nights in hospital and discharged on 28 April.

==== Eubank vs Benn II ====
A day after the first meeting, Turki Alalshikh told reporters a rematch was likely to take place in September 2025, again at the Tottenham Hotspur Stadium in London. It was dependent on whether both boxers escaped the first fight uninjured and awaiting the 2025–26 Premier League fixtures, to confirm the stadium was available. Eubank's promoter Ben Shalom argued the rematch should not be at the 160 pound limit. He said, "The rehydration clause is probably less dangerous than the 160lb limit now at this stage in his career. That's where probably it's the biggest challenge. As the organisers of the event everyone has to be sensible as to how we approach the second fight. That probably was the one downer on the event, all the talk about the weight." The BBBofC called Eubank to appear in front of the board in July to discuss his possible use of sauna whilst cutting weight for the first fight. Robert Smith did not want to assume anything and wanted to hear what Eubank had to say. There was no speculation on what punishment Eubank would receive if was found that he had used the sauna in his weight-cutting process. On 9 July, Eubank was cleared of using a sauna to help cut weight for the first fight, however he breached the Board's rules after posting the footage. He was guilty of 'improper use of social media' and fined £10,000 for the offence.

On 29 June, Alalshikh announced the rematch was set and all terms were agreed for the rematch to take place on 20 September in London. It was contracted that the fight would take place again at the Tottenham Hotspur Stadium. In July, Ring Magazine reported that itself, Riyadh Season and SELA were no longer involved in the rematch talks between Eubank and Benn. Benn accused Eubank for the delay. A few days later Ring Magazine retracted the statement and stated a date in November 2025 would be explored instead. Hearn stated that the November date was suitable for them. Simultaneously, he was engaged in talks with PBC regarding Benn's potential challenge against WBC champion Mario Barrios. On 6 August 2025, Ring Magazine announced that the rematch would occur on 15 November 2025, once more at the Tottenham Hotspur Stadium in London. It was also confirmed that SELA would serve as the lead promoter, with sponsorship from Ring Magazine and Riyadh Season. Hearn suggested Eubank would make the weight for the rematch without difficulty, due to his recent fights also being contested at the 160-pound limit. Eubank cautioned Eddie Hearn that he would "expose" him again if he attended the press conference scheduled for 15 November. The two have a history of confrontations during press events, as Eubank had previously silenced Hearn at the last press conference. Hearn suggested he might boycott the forthcoming press conference to prevent any potential embarrassment. Eubank circulated the video, reaffirming his position regarding Hearn's attendance.

At the press conference, Eubank opened up about the severe dehydration he experienced after their first fight, which led to a medical emergency made worse by stadium staff delaying the ambulance. He accused Benn and Hearn of twisting the narrative about his health to the media, which prompted Hearn to threaten legal action. Eubank went on to describe what he believed were attempts to undermine his performance, including breaches of contract, financial penalties, strict rehydration rules, a questionable weigh-in, and biased commentary. He also mentioned that he faced delays getting into the stadium on fight night. Despite all these hurdles, he maintained that he emerged victorious, raising alarms about unethical practices in the sport. He did not hold back in criticizing Robert Smith from the British Boxing Board of Control for allowing media access to his weigh-in, which resulted in a hefty $500,000 fine, and for letting Benn use gloves that didn't meet the regulations. Eubank also claimed that Smith permitted Billy Joe Saunders into his changing room before the fight. He painted Smith as manipulative and part of a corrupt system that he believes is swayed by Matchroom and Eddie Hearn. Eubank made a notable change to his training team, replacing Jonathon Banks with Brian "BoMac" McIntyre. The decision was influenced by Eubank's past success with McIntyre, particularly in his rematch against Liam Smith, which he won. A month before the fight, Eubank appeared on "Inside The Ring" and told Max Kellerman that he was dissatisfied with certain terms in his contract for the rematch. According to Eubank, negotiations were still ongoing. Just as the first bout, Eubank was listed as a -175 favourite over Benn, who was listed +135, by DraftKings. It was reported that Eubank would take a purse of £10 million for the rematch, the same earned for the first fight, with Benn taking home £8 million. At the final press conference, Eubank Sr. made an unexpected appearance to refute allegations from Benn and his team that he had been paid to attend the first fight in April. He stated that the claims were untrue and disrespectful. Eubank Jr also expressed criticism towards team Benn regarding the accusations. Benn weighed in at 159.3 pounds, heavier than Eubank's weight of 159.1 pounds.

In front of over 60,000 in attendance, Eubank made his entrance to the ring accompanied by his father Chris Sr. and American rapper 50 Cent, who performed his singles "Many Men (Wish Death)", "Wanksta" and "I'll Whip Ya Head Boy". In the ring, Eubank was dropped twice in the twelfth round and went on to lose to Benn via a one-sided unanimous decision. Unlike the first fight, which was highly competitive, the rematch was largely one-sided, with Benn dominating from the early rounds. Eubank, who was sluggish and subdued, lacked the same energy and explosiveness. Benn began aggressively, landing clean shots consistently, while Eubank attempted to counter. During the middle rounds, Eubank remained lethargic and struggled to vary his punches. Benn had continued success, landing notable right hands in rounds seven and nine. In the final found, the first knockdown occurred after a straight left, which sent Eubank stumbling. Eubank made it to his feet quickly and the second knockdown happened seconds later following a barrage of punches. Again, Eubank beat the count, with only seconds remaining in the fight, he acknowledged defeat. The official scorecards were 119-107, 116-110, and 118-108 in Benn's favour.

According to CompuBox, Benn was both busier and more accurate, landing 173 of 426 punches (40%), with 70 of them targeting the body. Eubank landed 68 of 365 (19%). Eubank averaged 6 punches landed per round, compared to the first fight where averaged 31 punches. After the fight, Benn celebrated emphatically in the ring with his father Nigel Benn and promoter Hearn. He ruled out a trilogy fight, declaring the feud was over. He now wanted to pursue a world title. Eubank was gracious in defeat and praised Benn's performance. He claimed he had gone "through hell and back" preparing for the fight. He hinted at taking time off or exploring retirement.

In June 2026, Eddie Hearn stated that Eubank may not have been medically fit ahead of his rematch with Benn, citing the difficulty of making the contracted weight. Hearn stated that the weight requirements had been "extremely difficult" for Eubank and suggested that, in hindsight, he “probably shouldn’t have been in the ring.”

=== Return to super middleweight ===
On 2 December 2025, a concerning video was posted via Eubank's social media, showing him unconscious on a hospital bed, undergoing a medical procedure. The caption included: “I will not box again until I’m back to 100 per cent and I don’t know when that will be." In January 2026, Ben Shalom told ESPN, that Eubank's recovery was going well and was expected to make a comeback in the ring later in the year, campaigning once again at super middleweight. Despite opposing the use of rehydration clauses, Shalom did not believe Eubank's health issues stemmed from the weigh cut.

On 28 February 2026, it was reported that Eubank was in talks with Edgar Belanga's team for a fight in the first half of the year. At this stage, the main obstacle in arranging the fight was the weight. Eubank preferred a 164 pound catchweight, while Berlanga insisted he could not go below 168 pounds. Berlanga tweeted the fight could take place in London. In March 2026, Australian boxer Michael Zerafa stated that negotiations for a bout with Eubank were advanced, claiming that terms had been agreed in principle and that only financial backing remained. Zerafa said that Eubank had identified him as a desired opponent. In April, Eubank's manager Elliot “Napper” Amoakoh also confirmed that talks were in advanced stages, and likely to take place in a stadium in Australia. He revealed that the fight was previously close to taking place in 2024 on a Riyadh show. In July 2026, it was reported that Eubank was being lined up for a return to the ring in Lagos, Nigeria, in December. The proposed event was being developed by Balmoral Promotions, whose head, Dr. Ezekiel Adamu, said the company was working on a major stadium show involving Eubank.

In August 2026, rumours circulated that Kell Brook was coming out of retirement for a fight against Eubank. In November, Ben Shalom reported that terms were being agreed for a fight to take place between them. Eubank Jr's management team later stated that while terms were not agreed, talks were in place for dates, purses and location.

== Personal life ==
In November 2025, Eubank Jr confirmed he and his girlfriend were expecting twin boys. His girlfriend gave birth to twin boys on 27 February 2026.

== Outside boxing ==
In November 2025, Chris Eubank Jr starred in the documentary The Eubanks: Like Father, Like Son on BBC, which offers an intimate look into his life, career, and complex relationship with his estranged father, Chris Eubank Sr.

He also starred in the second series of The Gentlemen.

== Professional boxing record ==
39 fights	35 wins	4 losses
By knockout	25	1
By decision	10	3

No.	Result	Record	Opponent	Type	Round, time	Date	Location	Notes
39	Loss	35–4	Conor Benn	UD	12	15 Nov 2025	Tottenham Hotspur Stadium, London, England	
38	Win	35–3	Conor Benn	UD	12	26 Apr 2025	Tottenham Hotspur Stadium, London, England	
37	Win	34–3	Kamil Szeremeta	TKO	7 (12), 1:45	12 Oct 2024	Kingdom Arena, Riyadh, Saudi Arabia	Won vacant IBO middleweight title
36	Win	33–3	Liam Smith	TKO	10 (12), 1:45	2 Sep 2023	Manchester Arena, Manchester, England	
35	Loss	32–3	Liam Smith	TKO	4 (12), 1:09	21 Jan 2023	Manchester Arena, Manchester, England	
34	Win	32–2	Liam Williams	UD	12	5 Feb 2022	Cardiff International Arena, Cardiff, Wales	
33	Win	31–2	Wanik Awdijan	RTD	5 (10), 3:00	16 Oct 2021	Newcastle Arena, Newcastle, England	
32	Win	30–2	Marcus Morrison	UD	10	1 May 2021	Manchester Arena, Manchester, England	
31	Win	29–2	Matt Korobov	TKO	2 (12), 0:34	7 Dec 2019	Barclays Center, New York City, New York, US	Won vacant WBA interim middleweight title
30	Win	28–2	James DeGale	UD	12	23 Feb 2019	The O2 Arena, London, England	Won vacant IBO super-middleweight title
29	Win	27–2	J.J. McDonagh	RTD	3 (10), 3:00	28 Sep 2018	King Abdullah Sports City, Jeddah, Saudi Arabia	
28	Loss	26–2	George Groves	UD	12	17 Feb 2018	Manchester Arena, Manchester, England	Lost IBO super-middleweight title; For WBA (Super) super-middleweight title; World Boxing Super Series: super-middleweight semi-final
27	Win	26–1	Avni Yıldırım	KO	3 (12), 1:58	7 Oct 2017	Hanns-Martin-Schleyer-Halle, Stuttgart, Germany	Retained IBO super-middleweight title; World Boxing Super Series: super-middleweight quarter-final
26	Win	25–1	Arthur Abraham	UD	12	15 Jul 2017	Wembley Arena, London, England	Retained IBO super-middleweight title
25	Win	24–1	Renold Quinlan	TKO	10 (12), 2:07	4 Feb 2017	London Olympia, London, England	Won IBO super-middleweight title
24	Win	23–1	Tom Doran	TKO	4 (12), 2:35	25 Jun 2016	The O2 Arena, London, England	Retained British middleweight title
23	Win	22–1	Nick Blackwell	TKO	10 (12), 2:21	26 Mar 2016	Wembley Arena, London, England	Won British middleweight title
22	Win	21–1	Gary O'Sullivan	RTD	7 (12), 3:00	12 Dec 2015	The O2 Arena, London, England	
21	Win	20–1	Tony Jeter	TKO	2 (12), 0:29	24 Oct 2015	Sheffield Arena, Sheffield, England	Retained WBA interim middleweight title
20	Win	19–1	Dmitry Chudinov	TKO	12 (12), 2:11	28 Feb 2015	The O2 Arena, London, England	Won WBA interim middleweight title
19	Loss	18–1	Billy Joe Saunders	SD	12	29 Nov 2014	ExCeL, London, England	For European, British, and Commonwealth middleweight titles
18	Win	18–0	Omar Siala	TKO	2 (8), 1:50	25 Oct 2014	Liverpool Arena, Liverpool, England	
17	Win	17–0	Ivan Jukić	TKO	1 (10), 2:32	26 Jul 2014	Manchester Arena, Manchester, England	
16	Win	16–0	Štěpán Horváth	TKO	6 (8), 2:08	7 Jun 2014	Newcastle Arena, Newcastle, England	
15	Win	15–0	Robert Swierzbinski	TKO	7 (8), 1:03	10 May 2014	Liverpool Olympia, Liverpool, England	
14	Win	14–0	Sandor Micsko	TKO	2 (8), 1:43	12 Apr 2014	Copper Box Arena, London, England	
13	Win	13–0	Alistair Warren	RTD	3 (8), 3:00	22 Feb 2014	York Hall, London, England	
12	Win	12–0	Frankie Borg	TKO	6 (6), 2:48	16 Nov 2013	Bluewater, Stone, England	
11	Win	11–0	Alexey Ribchev	TKO	3 (8), 1:45	14 Sep 2013	Magna Science Adventure Centre, Rotherham, England	
10	Win	10–0	Tyan Booth	TKO	8 (8), 2:31	8 Jun 2013	Bluewater, Stone, England	
9	Win	9–0	Olegs Fedotovs	TKO	2 (8), 1:55	8 Dec 2012	Hull Venue, Hull, England	
8	Win	8–0	Bradley Pryce	PTS	8	1 Dec 2012	Odyssey Arena, Belfast, Northern Ireland	
7	Win	7–0	Ruslans Pojonisevs	PTS	8	13 Oct 2012	Bluewater, Stone, England	
6	Win	6–0	Tadas Jonkus	TKO	3 (6), 2:29	22 Sep 2012	Arena Nord, Frederikshavn, Denmark	
5	Win	5–0	Terry Carruthers	PTS	6	7 Jul 2012	Hand Arena, Clevedon, England	
4	Win	4–0	Harry Matthews	PTS	6	12 May 2012	Hillsborough Leisure Centre, Sheffield, England	
3	Win	3–0	Paul Allison	TKO	4 (6)	14 Apr 2012	Odyssey Arena, Belfast, Northern Ireland	
2	Win	2–0	Jason Ball	PTS	6	18 Feb 2012	Magna Science Adventure Centre, Rotherham, England	
1	Win	1–0	Kirilas Psonko	TKO	4 (6), 1:46	12 Nov 2011	EventCity, Manchester, England	

== Pay-per-view bouts ==
Date	Fight	Billing	Pay-per-view buys	Network
4 February 2017	Quinlan vs Eubank	Reborn	86,000	ITV Box Office
15 July 2017	Eubank vs Abraham	London War		ITV Box Office
7 October 2017	Eubank vs Yıldırım	WBSS: Quarter-final		ITV Box Office
17 February 2018	Groves vs Eubank	WBSS: Semi-final		ITV Box Office
23 February 2019	DeGale vs Eubank	Bragging Rights		ITV Box Office
21 January 2023	Eubank vs Smith	Unleashed	200,000	Sky Sports Box Office
2 September 2023	Smith vs Eubank II	Repeat or Revenge		Sky Sports Box Office
26 April 2025	Eubank vs Benn	Fatal Fury	620,000	Sky Sports Box Office & DAZN PPV
15 November 2025	Eubank vs Benn II	Unfinished Business		DAZN PPV

== Titles in boxing ==
=== Minor world titles ===
- IBO middleweight title (160 lbs)
- IBO super middleweight title (168 lbs) (x2)

=== Interim world titles ===
- WBA interim middleweight title (160 lbs) (x2)

=== National titles ===
- British middleweight title (160 lbs)

=== Amateur titles ===
- Nevada State Golden Gloves title (165 lbs)

== Awards ==
=== Awards Won ===
- 2025 The Ring Magazine Fight of the Year for Chris Eubank Jr vs. Conor Benn
- 2026 BBBofC Contest of the Year for Chris Eubank Jr vs. Conor Benn

=== Nominations ===
- 2025 The Ring Magazine Round of the Year for Chris Eubank Jr vs. Conor Benn ~ Round 12

Sporting positions
Regional boxing titles
Preceded by Nick Blackwell	British middleweight champion 26 March 2016 – 16 September 2016; Vacated	Vacant Title next held by Tommy Langford
Minor world boxing titles
Preceded by Renold Quinlan	IBO super-middleweight champion 4 February 2017 – 17 February 2018; Vacant after loss to Groves	Vacant Title next held by Himself
Vacant Title last held by Himself	IBO super-middleweight champion 23 February 2019 – 17 December 2019; Vacated	Vacant Title next held by Carlos Góngora
Vacant Title last held by Etinosa Oliha	IBO middleweight champion 12 October 2024 – September 2025; Vacated	Vacant Title next held by Michel Soro
Major world boxing titles
Preceded by Dmitry Chudinov	WBA middleweight champion Interim title 28 February 2015 – 24 October 2015; Stripped	Succeeded by Alfonso Blanco awarded title
Vacant Title last held by Hassan N'Dam N'Jikam	WBA middleweight champion Interim title 7 December 2019 – 25 August 2021; Stripped	Vacant
