= Tommy Langford =

British boxer (born 1989)

Personal information
- Nationality: British
- Born: Thomas Langford; 12 July 1989 (age 37) Barnstaple, Devon, England
- Height: 6 ft 0 in (183 cm)
- Weight: Middleweight

Boxing career
- Stance: Orthodox

Boxing record
- Total fights: 25
- Wins: 21
- Win by KO: 6
- Losses: 4

Thomas Langford (born 12 July 1989) is a British professional boxer. He held the British middleweight title from 2016 to 2018, and the Commonwealth middleweight title in 2016.

== Professional career ==
Langford made his professional debut on 8 September 2012, winning a four-round points decision against Steve Spence. On 4 July 2015, Langford won his first regional championship—the vacant WBO Inter-Continental middleweight title—by stopping Julio Cesar Avalos in four rounds. A breakout year in 2016 saw him first win the vacant Commonwealth middleweight title on 12 March, scoring a unanimous decision over Lewis Taylor. Langford was scheduled to face British middleweight champion Chris Eubank Jr. on 22 October, but Eubank Jr. withdrew from the fight in September due to an elbow injury. On 26 November, Langford won the then-vacant British middleweight title with a split decision against Sam Sheedy.

=== Langford vs. Welborn ===
On 4 May 2018, Langford fought Jason Welborn. Jason Welborn retained the British middleweight title by beating Langford via split decision, 114-113, 114-113 and 113-115.

=== Langford vs Welborn II ===
In the rematch, the fight was as close as the first one, with Welborn again coming away with the split decision victory, winning 115-114, 114-113 and 113-114.

=== Langford vs. Richards ===
On 27 April 2019, Langford fought Lerrone Richards for the vacant Commonwealth super middleweight championship. Richards won convincingly on the scorecards to win the Commonwealth belt, 118-110, 118-111 and 116-113.

== Personal life ==
Langford is a supporter of West Bromwich Albion F.C.

== Professional boxing record ==
25 fights	21 wins	4 losses
By knockout	6	1
By decision	15	3

No.	Result	Record	Opponent	Type	Round, time	Date	Location	Notes
25	Loss	21–4	Lerrone Richards	UD	12	27 Apr 2019	Wembley Arena, London, England	For vacant Commonwealth and WBO International super-middleweight titles
24	Win	21–3	Baptiste Castegnaro	PTS	6	3 Mar 2019	Town Hall, Walsall, England	
23	Loss	20–3	Jason Welborn	SD	12	8 Sep 2018	Arena Birmingham, Birmingham, England	For British middleweight title
22	Loss	20–2	Jason Welborn	SD	12	4 May 2018	Town Hall, Walsall, England	Lost British middleweight title
21	Win	20–1	Jack Arnfield	UD	12	17 Feb 2018	Manchester Arena, Manchester, England	Retained British middleweight title
20	Win	19–1	Miguel Aguilar	PTS	6	21 Oct 2017	First Direct Arena, Leeds, England	
19	Loss	18–1	Avtandil Khurtsidze	TKO	5 (12), 0:27	22 Apr 2017	Community Sports Arena, Leicester, England	For vacant WBO interim middleweight title
18	Win	18–0	Sam Sheedy	SD	12	26 Nov 2016	Motorpoint Arena, Cardiff, Wales	Won vacant British middleweight title
17	Win	17–0	Timo Laine	TKO	7 (10), 1:28	17 Jul 2016	Ice Arena, Cardiff, Wales	Retained WBO Inter-Continental middleweight title
16	Win	16–0	Lewis Taylor	UD	12	12 Mar 2016	Liverpool Arena, England	Retained WBO Inter-Continental middleweight title; Won vacant Commonwealth middleweight title
15	Win	15–0	Robert Swierzbinski	TKO	5 (10), 0:39	19 Dec 2015	Manchester Arena, Manchester, England	Retained WBO Inter-Continental middleweight title
14	Win	14–0	Cristian Fabian Rios	UD	10	3 Oct 2015	Civic Hall, Wolverhampton, England	Retained WBO Inter-Continental middleweight title
13	Win	13–0	Julio Cesar Avalos	TKO	4 (10), 2:41	4 Jul 2015	National Stadium, Dublin, Ireland	Won vacant WBO Inter-Continental middleweight title
12	Win	12–0	Wayne Reed	TKO	5 (10), 2:31	14 Feb 2015	Civic Hall, Wolverhampton, England	
11	Win	11–0	Gary Boulden	PTS	6	24 Oct 2014	Civic Hall, Wolverhampton, England	
10	Win	10–0	Nicky Jenman	TKO	2 (6), 2:51	1 Aug 2014	Civic Hall, Wolverhampton, England	
9	Win	9–0	Alistair Warren	TD	5 (6), 2:26	10 May 2014	Liverpool Olympia, Liverpool, England	Points TD: Warren cut from an accidental head clash
8	Win	8–0	Dan Blackwell	PTS	6	14 Mar 2014	Villa Park Holte Suite, Birmingham, England	
7	Win	7–0	Harry Matthews	PTS	6	13 Dec 2013	IceSheffield, Sheffield, England	
6	Win	6–0	Kieron Gray	PTS	6	6 Oct 2013	The Tower Ballroom, Birmingham, England	
5	Win	5–0	Robert Studzinski	PTS	6	21 Jun 2013	Paragon Hotel, Birmingham, England	
4	Win	4–0	Raimonds Sniedze	TKO	2 (6), 1:52	10 May 2013	Paragon Hotel, Birmingham, England	
3	Win	3–0	Jay Morris	PTS	6	24 Feb 2013	Digbeth Institute, Birmingham, England	
2	Win	2–0	Simone Lucas	PTS	4	19 Oct 2012	Holiday Inn, Birmingham, England	
1	Win	1–0	Steve Spence	PTS	4	8 Sep 2012	Digbeth Institute, Birmingham, England	

Sporting positions
Regional boxing titles
Vacant Title last held by John Ryder	WBO Inter-Continental middleweight champion 4 July 2015 – September 2016; Vacated	Vacant Title next held by Willie Monroe Jr.
Vacant Title last held by Billy Joe Saunders	Commonwealth middleweight champion 12 March 2016 – 28 November 2016; Vacated	Vacant Title next held by Sam Sheedy
Vacant Title last held by Chris Eubank Jr.	British middleweight champion 26 November 2016 – 4 May 2018	Succeeded by Jason Welborn
