= List of British middleweight boxing champions =

List of British middleweight boxing champions is a table showing the boxers who have won the British middleweight title. The title was first contested in 1891, came under the auspices of the National Sporting Club in 1909, and under the jurisdiction of the British Boxing Board of Control (BBBoC) since it was formed in 1929.

A champion may retire or voluntarily relinquish the title in order to fight for a higher-ranked championship. Where the date on which a champion relinquished the title is unclear, the date of the last BBBoC sanctioned fight is shown.

^{r}–Champion relinquished title.

^{s}–Champion stripped of title.

Name	Duration of reign	Defences
Tom Thomas	28 May 1906 – 14 November 1910	6
Jim Sullivan	14 November 1910 – 12 April 1912^{r}	0
Jack Harrison	20 May 1912 – 12 November 1913^{r}	0
Pat O'Keeffe	23 February 1914 – 22 May 1916	5
Bandsman Jack Blake	22 May 1916 – 28 January 1918	1
Pat O'Keeffe	28 January 1918^{r}	0
Ted "Kid" Lewis	11 March 1920^{r}	0
Tom Gummer	29 March 1920 – 28 March 1921	1
Gus Platts	28 March 1921 – 31 May 1921	1
Johnny Basham	31 May 1921^{r}	0
Ted "Kid" Lewis	14 October 1921 – 15 February 1923	3
Roland Todd	15 February 1923 – 4 June 1923^{r}	1
Tommy Milligan	12 July 1926 – 27 January 1927	2
Frank Moody	16 February 1927^{r}	0
Alexander Ireland	14 March 1928^{r}	0
Frank Moody	6 August 1928 – 17 September 1928	1
Alexander Ireland	17 September 1928 – 16 May 1929	2
Len Harvey	16 May 1929 – 10 April 1933	7
Jock McAvoy	10 April 1933 – 22 May 1939	4
Ernie Roderick	29 May 1945 – 28 October 1946	1
Vince Hawkins	28 October 1946 – 28 June 1948	1
Dick Turpin	28 June 1948 – 24 April 1950	2
Albert Finch	24 April 1950 – 17 October 1950	1
Randolph Turpin	17 October 1950^{r}	0
Johnny Sullivan	14 September 1954 – 16 June 1955	1
Pat McAteer	16 June 1955 – 5 September 1957^{r}	2
Terry Downes	30 September 1958 – 15 September 1959	1
John McCormack	15 September 1959 – 3 November 1959	1
Terry Downes	3 November 1959 – 5 July 1960^{r}	1
George Aldridge	26 November 1962 – 28 May 1963	1
Mick Leahy	28 May 1963 – 14 December 1964	1
Wally Swift	14 December 1964 – 8 November 1965	1
Johnny Pritchett	8 November 1965 – 26 February 1968^{r}	3
Les McAteer	14 July 1969 – 12 May 1970	1
Mark Rowe	12 May 1970 – 8 September 1970	1
Bunny Sterling	8 September 1970 – 11 February 1974	4
Kevin Finnegan	11 February 1974^{r}	0
Bunny Sterling	10 June 1975^{r}	0
Alan Minter	4 November 1975 – 14 September 1976^{r}	2
Kevin Finnegan	31 May 1977 – 8 November 1977^{r}	1
Alan Minter	8 November 1977^{r}	0
Tony Sibson	10 April 1979 – 6 November 1979	1
Kevin Finnegan	6 November 1979^{r}	0
Roy Gumbs	2 February 1981 – 14 September 1983	3
Mark Kaylor	14 September 1983 – 27 November 1984	1
Tony Sibson	27 November 1984^{r}	0
Herol Graham	24 April 1985^{r}	0
Brian Anderson	29 October 1986 – 16 September 1987	1
Tony Sibson	16 September 1987^{r}	0
Herol Graham	8 June 1988 – 23 September 1992	4
Frank Grant	23 September 1992 – 10 November 1993	2
Neville Brown	10 November 1993 – 17 January 1998	6
Glenn Catley	17 January 1998^{r}	0
Howard Eastman	30 November 1998 – 16 April 2003^{r}	3
Scott Dann	17 September 2004 – 16 September 2005^{r}	3
Howard Eastman	15 December 2006 – 28 September 2007	1
Wayne Elcock	28 September 2007 – 14 March 2009	2
Matthew Macklin	14 March 2009^{r}	0
Darren Barker	28 November 2009 - May 2011^{r}	0
Martin Murray	18 June 2011 - November 2012^{r}	0
Billy Joe Saunders	15 December 2012 - January 2015^{r}	3
Nick Blackwell	30 May 2015 – 26 March 2016	3
Chris Eubank, Jr.	26 March 2016 – 16 September 2016^{r}	1
Tommy Langford	26 November 2016 - 4 May 2018	2
Jason Welborn	4 May 2018 - 8 September 2018^{r}	1
Liam Williams	22 December 2018 - October 2020^{r}	2
Denzel Bentley	13 November 2020 - 24 April 2021	1
Felix Cash	24 April 2021^{r}	0
Denzel Bentley	13 May 2022 - 18 November 2023	2
Nathan Heaney	18 November 2023 - 20 July 2024	1
Brad Pauls	20 July 2024 - 7 December 2024	0
Denzel Bentley	7 December 2024^{r}	0
Kieron Conway	17 May 2025 - 17 October 2025	1
George Liddard	17 October 2025 - present	0

== See also ==
- List of British heavyweight boxing champions
- List of British cruiserweight boxing champions
- List of British light-heavyweight boxing champions
- List of British super-middleweight boxing champions
- List of British light-middleweight boxing champions
- List of British welterweight boxing champions
- List of British light-welterweight boxing champions
- List of British lightweight boxing champions
- List of British super-featherweight boxing champions
- List of British featherweight boxing champions
- List of British super-bantamweight boxing champions
- List of British bantamweight boxing champions
- List of British super-flyweight boxing champions
- List of British flyweight boxing champions
- List of British world boxing champions

== Sources ==
- boxrec
