= Avtandil Khurtsidze =

Georgian boxer (born 1979)

Personal information
- Nicknames: Tazman; Mini Mike Tyson Chaqucha
- Nationality: Georgian
- Born: 2 May 1979 (age 47) Kutaisi, Georgia
- Height: 1.63 m (5 ft 4 in)
- Weight: Middleweight

Boxing career
- Reach: 185 cm (73 in)
- Stance: Orthodox

Boxing record
- Total fights: 40
- Wins: 34
- Win by KO: 23
- Losses: 3
- Draws: 3

Avtandil Khurtsidze (Georgian: ავთანდილ ხურციძე; born 2 May 1979) is a Georgian professional boxer who has competed since 2002. He held the WBO interim middleweight title in 2017 and won the IBO middleweight title in 2011. He also challenged for the interim WBA middleweight title in 2010.

In September 2018, Khurtsidze was convicted of racketeering and wire fraud conspiracy and sentenced to ten years' imprisonment, he was released in 2022.

== Professional career ==
=== Early career ===
Khurtsidze compiled a record of 7–1–2 in his first ten fights, before making Ukraine his new home for his next fifteen fights. While fighting in Ukraine, he won the WBA Inter-Continental middleweight title in July 2008 and defended it four times. On 31 July 2010, Khurtsidze beat Sergey Khomitsky in Minsk, Belarus by sixth-round corner retirement.

==== Khurtsidze vs. N'Dam N'Jikam ====
The victory over Khomitsky marked Khurtsidze's 16th consecutive victory. Khurtsidze was now ranked #2 by the WBA, and his next fight was for the WBA interim middleweight title against Hassan N'Dam N'Jikam (ranked #1 by the WBA) on 30 October 2010 in Paris. During the fight, N’Dam N'Jikam was cut over both eyes, as Khurtsidze, being much smaller, tended to lean forward with his head like a stocky bull and often collided heads with his opponent. Despite Khurtsidze piling on constant pressure and being unfazed by N'Dam N'Jikam's shots, he lost a close unanimous decision with scores of 117-111, 115-114 and 115-114. The decision was controversial, which was reflected by the fans booing the announcement of the decision.

=== IBO middleweight champion ===
==== Khurtsidze vs. Cendrowski ====
Khurtsidze rebounded from the controversial loss to N'Dam N'Jikam by returning to his native Georgia for his next fight, the first time he had done so since his professional debut. He faced Mariusz Cendrowski for the vacant IBO middleweight title on 13 March 2011. Khurtsidze applied his trademark aggression to continuously stalk Cendrowski all over the ring, and landed powerful punches with his left hand throughout the duration of the fight. After twelve rounds, Khurtsidze was awarded a unanimous decision victory, with scores of 120–108, 116–112, 117–112, becoming the IBO middleweight champion.

==== Khurtsidze vs. Miranda ====
On 11 June 2011, Khurtsidze defended his IBO middleweight title against Dionisio Miranda in Kyiv, winning by first-round knockout. Khurtsidze knocked his opponent down with a crushing overhand left. Miranda got up but was quickly put on the canvas face down after Khurtsidze caught him with a big left hook.

Later that same year, Khurtsidze's title reign ended when he was stripped of his IBO title, due to the sanctioning body not approving of his choice of Ossie Duran as an opponent. Khurtsidze would go on to beat Duran on 18 December 2011 by majority decision, with scores of 114-114, 114-113 and 115-113, to capture the vacant WBC Silver middleweight title.

=== Winning streak in 2014-17 ===
==== Khurtsidze vs. Douglas ====
After his win against Ossie Duran, Khurtsidze had a layoff of over two and a half years. He finally returned to the ring in July 2014, where he would go on to win four consecutive bouts in the United States by technical knockout, before facing undefeated middleweight prospect Antoine Douglas as a short notice opponent on 5 March 2016, after Douglas' original opponent Sam Soliman sustained an injury. Despite being the betting underdog, Khurtsidze relentlessly pressed Douglas all night, dropping him in the third and seventh rounds, and eventually forced the referee to stop the action, winning the bout via tenth-round technical knockout.

==== Khurtsidze vs. Langford ====
In early February 2017, Khurtsidze, who was mandatory challenger for WBO middleweight champion Billy Joe Saunders, took a step aside fee to allow Saunders to pursue a bigger fight. On 28 February, it was announced that Khurtsidze would face undefeated Tommy Langford for the vacant interim WBO title on 22 April 2017. Langford was ranked #3 by the WBO at middleweight. Khurtsidze connected with a left hook to win the bout by fifth-round technical knockout, bringing his streak of consecutive TKO victories to six, and securing a world title shot against Saunders.

=== Canceled Saunders fight ===
The day after Khurtsidze's victory against Tommy Langford, the fight between Khurtsidze and WBO middleweight champion Billy Joe Saunders was announced as taking place at the Copper Box Arena in London on 8 July 2017. However, on 8 June, Khurtsidze was arrested in New York along with 32 others, linking him with a Russian and Georgian crime syndicate. Racketeer charges and conspiracy to commit fraud were the two alleged charges; promoter Lou DiBella said that, while the fight would not be completely called off, it would be postponed. Khurtsidze would ultimately never fight Saunders as he was convicted of racketeering and wire fraud conspiracy and sentenced to ten years' imprisonment in September 2018, effectively bringing his boxing career to an abrupt end.

== RICO indictment and incarceration ==
On 8 June 2017, prosecutors from the US District Court for the Southern District of New York indicted Khurtsidze on charges of violating the Racketeer Influenced and Corrupt Organization (RICO) Act and conspiracy to commit wire fraud in connection with a Russian organised crime syndicate operating in the New York City area. According to the indictment, Khurtsidze is alleged to have paid $17,800 for three cases of purportedly stolen cigarettes.

On 30 August 2018, it was reported that Khurtsidze had been stabbed in the face in a "stabbing rampage" in a Brooklyn detention center, after members of his crime syndicate Razhden Shulaya were involved in a reported row with a Latin American gang.

In September 2018, Khurtsidze was convicted of racketeering and wire fraud conspiracy and sentenced to ten years' imprisonment. He was released early on 14 September 2021, residing in Brooklyn. He has since fought three more boxing matches as of November 2025.

== Professional boxing record ==
40 fights, 34 wins (23 knockouts), 3 losses (1 knockout), 3 draws
Result	Record	Opponent	Type	Round, time	Date	Location	Notes
Loss	34-3-3	(United States) Harley Burke	MD	6	2025-11-22	(United States) The Paramount, Huntington	
Draw	34-2-3	(Equatorial Guinea) Andres Martinez	MD	6	2025-10-18	(United States) Barclays Center, Brooklyn	
Win	34-2-2	(Argentina) Victor Hugo Exner	TKO	1 (6), 2:20	2024-05-31	(United States) Melrose Ballroom, Queens	Return to ring after seven years
Win	33-2-2	(United Kingdom) Tommy Langford	TKO	5 (12), 0:27	2017-04-22	(United Kingdom) Leicester Arena, Leicester	Won interim WBO middleweight title
Win	32-2-2	(United States) Antoine Douglas	TKO	10 (10), 0:33	2016-03-05	(United States) Sands Bethlehem Event Center, Bethlehem, Pennsylvania	Won WBO International middleweight title
Win	31-2-2	(Dominican Republic) Melvin Betancourt	TKO	1 (8), 2:22	2015-08-07	(United States) Bally's Atlantic City, Atlantic City, New Jersey	
Win	30-2-2	(United States) Phillip Penson	TKO	4 (8), 1:00	2015-02-20	(United States) Hilton Westchester, Rye Brook, New York	
Win	29-2-2	(United States) Eddie Hunter	TKO	5 (8), 2:13	2014-10-30	(United States) Florentine Gardens, Hollywood, California	
Win	28-2-2	(United States) Allen Conyers	TKO	1 (8), 1:23	2014-07-23	(United States) BB King Blues Club & Grill, New York City	
Win	27-2-2	(Ghana) Ossie Duran	MD	12	2011-12-18	(Ukraine) Sport Palace Yunost, Zaporozhye	Won vacant WBC Silver middleweight title
Win	26-2-2	(United States) Jason LeHoullier	TKO	2 (10), 2:37	2011-10-03	(Ukraine) Sports Complex "Freestyle", Kyiv	
Win	25-2-2	(Colombia) Dionisio Miranda	KO	1 (12), 2:37	2011-06-11	(Ukraine) Sport Palace, Kyiv	Retained IBO middleweight title
Win	24-2-2	(Poland) Mariusz Cendrowski	UD	12	2011-03-13	(Georgia (country)) Sport Palace, Tbilisi	Won vacant IBO middleweight title
Loss	23-2-2	(Cameroon) Hassan N'Dam N'Jikam	UD	12	2010-10-30	(France) Palais des Sports Porte de Versailles, Paris XV, Paris	For interim WBA middleweight title
Win	23-1-2	(Belarus) Sergey Khomitsky	RTD	6 (10), 3:00	2010-07-31	(Belarus) Club Reaktor, Minsk	
Win	22-1-2	(Hungary) Mihaly Kotai	TD	8 (12)	2010-05-21	(Ukraine) Sports Complex "Freestyle", Kyiv	
Win	21-1-2	(Kyrgyzstan) Kuvanych Toygonbayev	TD	8 (12)	2009-11-20	(Ukraine) Budivelnik, Cherkasy	Retained WBA Inter-Continental and EBA middleweight titles
Win	20-1-2	(Belgium) Jamel Bakhi	RTD	5 (12), 3:00	2009-07-18	(Ukraine) Sportpalace, Odessa	Retained WBA Inter-Continental middleweight title
Win	19-1-2	(Hungary) Attila Kovacs	MD	12	2009-03-28	(Ukraine) Budivelnik, Cherkasy	Retained WBA Inter-Continental middleweight title
Win	18-1-2	(Argentina) Antonio Valentin Ochoa	UD	12	2008-09-27	(Ukraine) Sport Palace, Kyiv	Retained WBA Inter-Continental middleweight title
Win	17-1-2	(Argentina) Javier Alberto Mamani	MD	12	2008-07-05	(Ukraine) Sportpalace, Odessa	Won vacant WBA Inter-Continental middleweight title
Win	16-1-2	(Hungary) Ferenc Olah	TKO	2 (10)	2008-05-17	(Ukraine) Sportpalace Lokomotiv, Kharkov	
Win	15-1-2	(Latvia) Jurijs Boreiko	TKO	4 (12)	2008-03-23	(Ukraine) Sportpalace Meteor, Dnipropetrovsk	Won vacant EBA middleweight title
Win	14-1-2	(Azerbaijan) Tagir Rzaev	TKO	2 (8)	2008-02-21	(Ukraine) Sport Palace, Kyiv	
Win	13-1-2	(Ukraine) Volodymyr Borovskyy	UD	8	2007-11-17	(Ukraine) SC Voskhod, Kyiv	
Win	12-1-2	(Georgia (country)) Ruslan Semenov	TKO	5 (8)	2007-09-13	(Ukraine) Sport Palace, Kyiv	
Win	11-1-2	(Ukraine) Maksym Velychko	UD	6	2007-07-14	(Ukraine) Ukrainian House, Kyiv	
Win	10-1-2	(Ukraine) Taras Boyko	RTD	5 (8), 3:00	2007-06-09	(Ukraine) Sport Palace, Kyiv	
Win	9-1-2	(Russia) Denis Balandin	TKO	6 (6)	2007-04-26	(Ukraine) SC Voskhod, Kyiv	
Win	8-1-2	(Ukraine) Serhiy Petryk	TKO	3 (4)	2007-02-27	(Ukraine) Sport Palace, Kyiv	
Loss	7-1-2	(Guyana) Tony Marshall	TKO	7 (8), 1:33	2005-05-13	(United States) Saratoga Gaming and Raceway, Saratoga Springs, New York	
Win	7-0-2	(United States) Calvin Shakir	TKO	3 (6), 2:45	2005-03-18	(United States) New Alhambra, Philadelphia, Pennsylvania	
Win	6-0-2	(United States) Chris Hall	UD	6	2005-01-28	(United States) Tropicana Hotel & Casino, Atlantic City, New Jersey	
Draw	5-0-2	(Mexico) Carlos Antonio Escobar	PTS	6	2004-11-12	(United States) New Alhambra, Philadelphia, Pennsylvania	
Win	5-0-1	(United States) Leo Edwards	TKO	6 (6), 2:17	2004-10-15	(United States) New Alhambra, Philadelphia, Pennsylvania	
Win	4-0-1	(United States) Fred Drayton	TKO	1 (4)	2004-07-16	(United States) Hampton Beach Casino, Hampton Beach, New Hampshire	
Win	3-0-1	(United States) Jon Gaddis	UD	4	2004-06-18	(United States) New Alhambra, Philadelphia, Pennsylvania	
Draw	2-0-1	(United States) Orazio Robinson	PTS	4	2004-04-08	(United States) Wyndham Inner Harbor Hotel, Glen Burnie, Maryland	
Win	2-0	(United States) Kenny Kingsley	TKO	1 (4), 0:54	2004-02-20	(United States) Ballys Park Place Hotel Casino, Atlantic City, New Jersey	
Win	1-0	(Georgia (country)) George Kanchaveli	TKO	3 (4)	2002-10-11	(Georgia (country)) Sport Hall, Variani	

== See also ==
- List of IBO world champions

International championships
Vacant Title last held by Sebastian Sylvester	WBA Middleweight Champion; Inter-Continental title July 5, 2008 – October 30, 2010; Lost bid for interim world title	Vacant Title next held by Martin Murray
Preceded by Antione Douglas	WBO International Middleweight Champion; March 5, 2016 – April 22, 2017; Won interim world title	Vacant Title next held by Artur Akavov
World boxing titles
Vacant Title last held by Hassan N'Dam N'Jikam	WBO Middleweight Interim Champion; April 22 – June 14, 2017; Stripped	Vacant Title next held by Janibek Alimkhanuly
