= Jez Wilson =

British professional boxer (born 1979)

Personal information
- Nickname: Smoking
- Nationality: British
- Born: Jeremy Wilson; 22 June 1979 (age 47) Wolverhampton, West Midlands, UK
- Height: 1.75 m (5 ft 9 in)
- Weight: Middleweight

Boxing career
- Stance: Orthodox

Boxing record
- Total fights: 16
- Wins: 12
- Win by KO: 7
- Losses: 3
- Draws: 1

Jeremy "Jez" Wilson (born 22 June 1979) is a British professional boxer who fights at middleweight. He is originally from Wolverhampton but has been based in Sheffield for his entire career.

Wilson's interest in boxing started as a teenager but he was a relative latecomer to the professional ranks, turning professional at 27.

He made his debut at the Grosvenor Hotel in Sheffield in April 2007 and stopped Peter Cannon in round five. Since then, he has suffered a series of injuries and has also seen his career slowed down by multiple pull-outs by opponents. Being a bit more active in 2012–13 saw him pick up the BBBofC Central Area and British Masters middleweight titles.

In April 2014, Wilson faced John Ryder in a British title eliminator at the York Hall, Bethnal Green. Ryder stopped him in the ninth round, breaking his jaw in two places.

Wilson returned in September 2015, beating Dan Blackwell on points. In November 2015, Wilson challenged for Lewis Taylor's English middleweight title. Taylor stopped him in the fifth round. Wilson tested positive for the diuretic furosemide after the fight, and in March 2016 received a two-year ban from the sport, despite the UKAD accepting that he had taken the drug inadvertently.

Wilson is managed and trained by Glyn Rhodes and is under contract to Ricky Hatton's Hatton Promotions.
