= Billy Joe Saunders =

British boxer (born 1989)

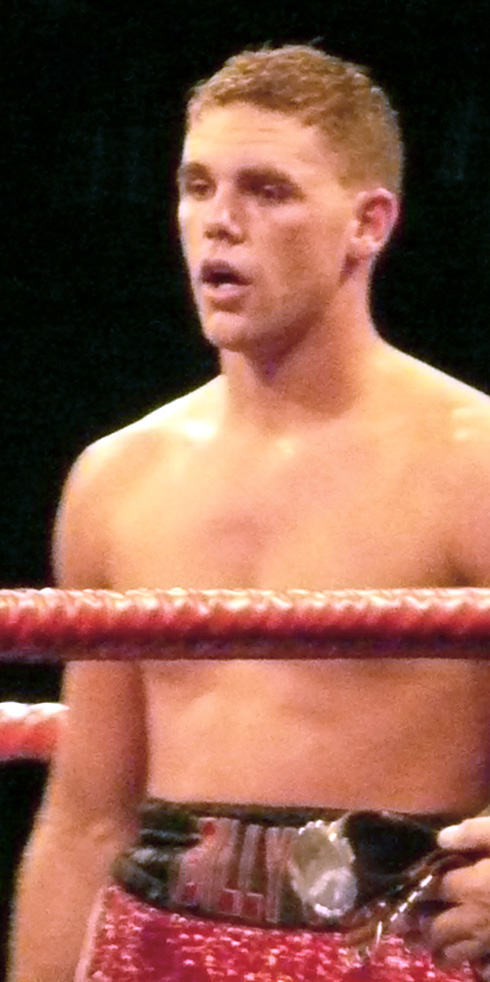
- Saunders in 2011

Personal information
- Nickname: Superb
- Born: 30 August 1989 (age 37) Welwyn Garden City, Hertfordshire, England
- Height: 5 ft 11 in (180 cm)
- Weight: Middleweight; Super-middleweight

Boxing career
- Reach: 71 in (180 cm)
- Stance: Southpaw

Boxing record
- Total fights: 31
- Wins: 30
- Win by KO: 14
- Losses: 1
Medal record
Men's amateur boxing
Representing England
EU Junior Championships
Gold medal – first place	2007 Warsaw	Welterweight
Strandzha Cup
Gold medal – first place	2008 Bulgaria	Welterweight
EU Championships
Gold medal – first place	2008 Cetniewo	Welterweight
Commonwealth Championships
Gold medal – first place	2007 Liverpool	Welterweight

Billy Joe Saunders (born 30 August 1989) is a British former professional boxer who competed from 2009 to 2021. He held the World Boxing Organization (WBO) middleweight world title from 2015 to 2018. He also held the (WBO) super-middleweight world title from 2019 to 2021. At regional level, he held the European, British, and Commonwealth middleweight titles between 2012 and 2015.

As an amateur, he won a gold medal at the 2008 European Union Championships. He also represented Great Britain at the 2008 Olympics.

== Early life ==
Originally from Cheshunt, Saunders is of Romani descent and grew up on a Romanichal and Traveller site near Hatfield, Hertfordshire. His great-grandfather, Absolom Beeney, was one of the community's most famous bare-knuckle boxers.

== Amateur career ==
Saunders fought for Cheshunt Amateur Boxing club and also at Hoddesdon Amateur Boxing Club. Saunders won his first 49 amateur fights at senior level, including the 2007 Commonwealth Championships and the 2008 Strandzha Cup, edging out Cuban Carlos Banteux. In 2008 Saunders qualified for the Beijing Olympics in the welterweight division at the age of 18. At the European area qualifier in Pescara, Italy he beat European champion Andrey Balanov and Kakhaber Zhvania, but lost in the semi-final to Oleksandr Stretskyy before beating Pavol Hlavačka for the all-important third spot. to become the first person from the British Romanichal community to qualify for the games.

In Beijing he beat Adem Kılıççı in the first round but lost to old foe Carlos Banteux in the second. He was subsequently suspended for "lewd behaviour", allegedly pertaining to an incident with a local woman during a pre-season training camp in France. In early December 2008 Saunders turned professional.

== Professional career ==
=== Middleweight ===
==== Early career ====
Saunders made his professional debut on 28 February 2009 at the National Indoor Arena in Birmingham, against Attila Molnar. Saunders looked confident from the opening bell, landing hard combinations which quickly overwhelmed Molnar. In round two, a series of punches that landed flush on Molnar's chin caused the referee to stop the fight and save a dazed Molnar. Saunders won his second fight by second-round stoppage of Ronny Gabel and his third fight, also by second round stoppage, of Matt Scriven. On 9 October 2009, he went four full rounds to outpoint Alex Spitko. On 21 May 2011, he scored an impressive second-round knockout victory over Kevin Hammond. Saunders went on to score wins against Norbert Szekeres, Gary Boulden and Tony Hill, the last of these giving him his seventh professional knockout victory and his first major regional title, the Commonwealth middleweight championship, on 28 April 2012. For his first defence of the title, on 1 June, Saunders went the full twelve-round distance (also a first) against veteran Bradley Pryce, outpointing him comfortably. A then-undefeated Jarrod Fletcher was quickly dispatched in two rounds on 14 September.

On 15 December, Saunders fought Nick Blackwell for the vacant British middleweight title. This turned out to be one of Saunders's first tough outings, as he was forced to go the full twelve rounds en route to a competitive unanimous decision victory on the judges' scorecards. A pair of trouble-free fights came next, against tough slugger Matthew Hall on 21 March 2013 and Gary O'Sullivan on 20 July, both of which also lasted twelve full rounds. 2013 concluded for Saunders with another tough fight on 21 September, this time against fellow British prospect John Ryder in defence of the Commonwealth and British middleweight titles. Both fighters came in undefeated and fought for twelve competitive rounds, with very close scorecards all favouring Saunders.

==== Saunders vs. Blandamura, Eubank Jr. ====
It would be almost another year until Saunders had his next fight. On 26 July 2014 he added to his title collection with an eighth-round knockout of Emanuele Blandamura, earning him the European middleweight title. Immediately after the Blandamura fight, Saunders called out another undefeated British prospect and archrival Chris Eubank Jr. Prolonged negotiations ensued between Frank Warren and Eubank's team (led by his father Chris Eubank Sr.), with the highly anticipated fight eventually signed in October and taking place on 29 November. All three of Saunders' titles were on the line, as well as being an eliminator for the WBO world middleweight title. The rivalry and build-up was likened to the first fight between Nigel Benn and Chris Eubank in 1990. Saunders went on to defeat Eubank via split decision; two judges had scores of 115–114 and 115–113 for Saunders, with the third judge scoring 116–113 for Eubank. Having secured his third defence of the British middleweight title, Saunders earned the Lonsdale Belt outright; he gave this to his father Tommy as a Christmas present.

==== Saunders vs. Lee ====
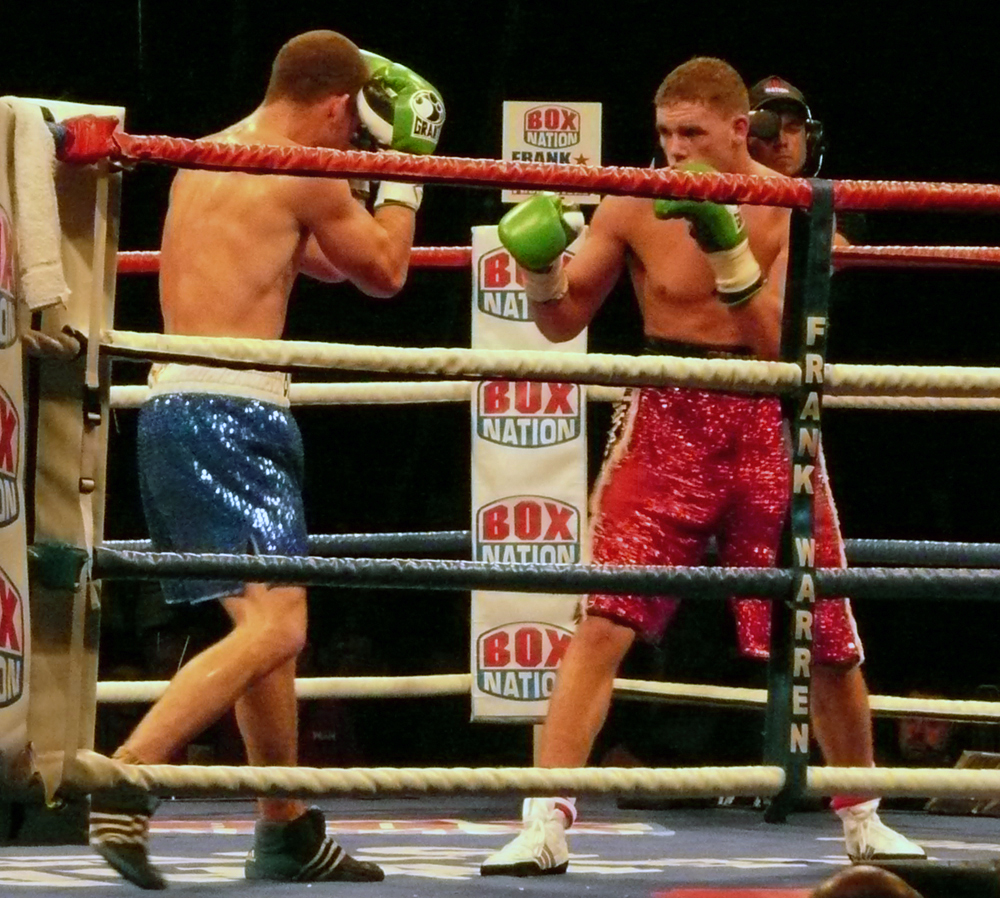
Saunders (right) vs. Gary Boulden, 2011

With the win over Eubank, Saunders was in line for an opportunity to fight WBO world middleweight champion Andy Lee. In February 2015, Saunders and Warren accepted a 'step-aside' financial offer from promoter Lou DiBella in order for Lee to face Peter Quillin instead. Warren said that he hoped for Lee to win that fight so that Saunders vs. Lee could be staged in the summer. At around the same time, due to his high ranking, Saunders also received an offer from the IBF to fight for their vacant world middleweight title, but he reiterated his intention to follow the WBO route. In June, Saunders vs. Lee was officially announced for the WBO world middleweight title. The fight was initially scheduled to take place in Lee's hometown of Limerick on 19 September, but was postponed and moved to Manchester on 10 October due to Lee suffering from a viral infection. On 1 September, yet another postponement arose due to Saunders receiving a cut in sparring. The fight was subsequently rescheduled for 19 December.

On 24 July, Saunders took a tune-up fight, weighing in at 173 pounds (78 kg), near the light-heavyweight limit—and stopped Yoann Bloyer in four rounds. On 19 December, Saunders defeated WBO middleweight champion Andy Lee via majority decision to capture his first world title, with judges' scores of 114–112, 115–111, and 113–113. In the third round, Saunders scored two knockdowns against Lee to build up an early lead on the scorecards. He then continued to outbox Lee using head movement and an accurate jab until the later rounds. At this point, Lee began to land more frequently with heavy punches of his own, but was too late to overcome the points deficit despite a strong finish in the final round.

Saunders's first defence of the title was scheduled for 30 April 2016, against Max Bursak at the Copper Box in London. However, Saunders was forced to pull out due to a hand injury sustained in training. "I'm bitterly disappointed. This is boxing and these things happen", he said at the time.

On 8 July, Saunders revealed that he would be fighting on 17 September, likely on the undercard of Canelo Álvarez vs. Liam Smith at AT&T Stadium in Arlington, Texas, which would have been broadcast on HBO pay-per-view in the US. It was rumoured that this would set up a WBO middleweight title defence against Álvarez in December. However, Golden Boy Promotions vice president Eric Gomez told ESPN on 14 August that Saunders would no longer feature on the undercard due to him rejecting all of the opponents presented to him. Opponents supposedly brought forward by Golden Boy were Gabriel Rosado, Curtis Stevens, and Willie Monroe Jr.

==== Saunders vs. Akavov ====
Frank Warren finally confirmed Saunders first title defence would be against WBO European middleweight champion Artur Akavov (16–1 7 KOs), ranked by the WBO at number 10. The fight was due to take place at the Motorpoint Arena in Cardiff on 22 October live on BoxNation. The fight card was postponed to 26 November after Saunders suffered a muscle injury, along with his stablemate Liam Williams also suffering an injury during a sparring session. The fight was postponed again to 3 December due to transitional issues with Akavov getting into the UK, the fight then took place at Lagoon Leisure Centre in Paisley, Renfrewshire, Glasgow, Scotland.

Saunders started off slow, showing signs of ring rust. Up until round 5, Akavov was the aggressor and doing enough to take the rounds. In rounds 5, 6, 7 and 8, Saunders bounced back and hit combos landing power shots in the process. This seemed to have tired Saunders out for the last two rounds. The fight went the full 12 rounds. Saunders won on all scorecards claiming a unanimous decision to retain his WBO title. The three judges scored it 116–113, 116–112, and 115–113 in favour of Saunders. Immediately following the announcement, Saunders took the microphone off the MC and thanked the live crowd for coming and harshly criticized himself on his performance, "There was nothing there. I've been out a year, a bit overweight. A few adjustments to camp. Just flat, really, really flat. I'd like to apologise to the fans, especially who paid for it. Terrible performance." According to Compubox Stats, Saunders landed 85 punches of 579 thrown (14%), with 51 jabs landed and Akavov landed 81 of his 624 thrown (13%), this included 44 power punches.

On 20 December, it was announced that Saunders had parted with long time trainer Jimmy Tibbs, who he had been mentored by since turning professional in 2008. Rumours had started when Tibbs was not present at Saunders last title defence against Akavov. Instead having Danny Vaughan, Johnney Roye and Ben Davison in his corner. Promoter Frank Warren officially confirmed the news. On 18 January 2017, Saunders announced he would be working with Adam Booth.

==== Cancelled Avtandil Khurtsidze fight ====
In early February 2017, mandatory challenger Avtandil Khurtsidze (32–2–2, 21 KOs) took a 'step-a-side' fee to allow Saunders to pursue a bigger fight. On 28 February, it was announced that Khurtsidze would fight undefeated British boxer Tommy Langford for the vacant interim WBO title in April.

After retaining his belts against Jacobs, Gennady Golovkin stated that he wanted to unify the middleweight division and hold all the belts available. Golovkin said, "My goal is all the belts in the middleweight division. Of course, Billy Joe is the last one. It is my dream." Rumours of the fight taking place in Golovkin's home country Kazakhstan in June during the EXPO 2017. The last time Golovkin fought in his home country was in 2010. On 20 March, Golovkin said that he would fight Saunders in his native Kazakhstan or the O2 Arena in London.

Saunders tweeted on social media that although he did not watch Golovkin's fight with Daniel Jacobs, he was ready to fight him. Saunders claimed to have signed the contract on his end and gave Golovkin a deadline to sign his. On 29 March, Frank Warren also stated that Golovkin would have ten days to sign for the fight. Saunders later claimed to have moved on from Golovkin, until Warren said the deal was still in place. Over the next week, Saunders continued to insult Golovkin through social media. On 7 April, Warren told iFL TV, that Golovkin had a hand injury, which was the reason why the fight hadn't been made. In the interview, he said, "At the moment, they're saying that Golovkin's injured. So we're waiting to see where this is all going. But as far as I'm concerned, we agreed [to] terms." It was also noted that he would wait until 6 May, for any updates. On 11 April, it was reported that the fight would not take place and Golovkin would ultimately focus on a September 2017 fight against Canelo Álvarez.

On 22 April 2017, Khurtsidze knocked Langford out in round 5 with a left hook to secure his next fight against Saunders. A day later the fight between Saunders and Khurtsidze was discussed to take place at the Copper Box in London on 8 July 2017.

On 8 June, Khurtsidze was arrested in New York along with 32 others, linking him in a Russian and Georgian crime syndicate. Racketeer charges and conspiracy to commit fraud were the two alleged charges, promoter Lou DiBella said, while the fight would not be completely called off, it would be postponed. Due to the fight being a mandatory defence, Saunders's promoter Frank Warren said that he was unable to make a voluntary defence, as such, taken off the card completely, although the rest of the card would still take place. On 20 June 2017 the WBO released a statement in which it said that the Interim WBO title would be vacated and that Khurtsidze's team would have 10 days to appeal the decision.

==== Saunders vs. Monroe Jr. ====
On 14 June 2017, Frank Warren announced that Saunders would likely make his second title defence in September 2017. Names in the running included David Lemieux, Ryota Murata and Rob Brant. The plan was to have Saunders fight around the same week as Golovkin vs. Álvarez, and then fight the winner. The date of Saunders defence was confirmed by Warren, to take place on 16 September.

On 28 June, it was revealed that Saunders had parted ways with trainer Adam Booth, after working together for only six months, and joined Sheffield based trainer Dominic Ingle. Saunders claimed that the reason for the split with Booth was due to being 'too close to home' and ongoing distractions. Ingle confirmed the statement to Boxing News. Lemieux admitted to passing on the opportunity to fight Saunders because he was pursuing a bigger money fight, possibly with Miguel Cotto.

Warren announced on 6 July, that a deal was in place for Saunders to defend his title against former world title challenger Willie Monroe Jr. (21–2, 6 KOs) at the Copper Box Arena in London on 16 September 2017. Monroe was coming off a unanimous decision win against Gabe Rosado on 17 September 2016. At the press conference, Warren said the winner would highly likely be in a position to fight the winner of Golovkin and Álvarez. Monroe was said to be excited fighting outside of the US for the first time in his career. Throughout the promotion, Saunders had tried to get the better of Monroe. This continued at the official weigh in. As Saunders stood on the scale, his 7-year-old son, Stevie Saunders, also took to stage. Monroe patted Stevie on the head, to which he reacted by punching and kicking Monroe to the groin. Banner Promotions Vice-President, Matt Rowland felt disheartened to Saunders 'non-reaction'. Monroe also had no immediate reaction to being hit on the groin. Monroe later reacted stating that he intended to sue unless he was compensated. Saunders defeated Monroe via unanimous decision 117–111, 115–114, and 117–112 on the cards respectively. Saunders controlled the fight throughout, suffering a cut over his right eye during a clash of heads in round 4. Monroe did not pose much threat and lack of knockout power, saw him on the backfoot, pot-shotting and using his jab frequently. In the post-fight, Saunders thanked Monroe for coming over to the UK for the fight, while his son apologised for hitting him in the groin. Warren stated that Saunders would likely fight again in December 2017.

==== Saunders vs. Lemieux ====
Although the Golovkin vs. Canelo fight ended in a split draw, Saunders still pursued a unification fight next. After weeks of going back and forth with former IBF champion David Lemieux (38–3, 33 KOs) on Twitter, on 10 October, the WBO ordered them to meet in a mandatory fight with both camps having 30 days to negotiate a fight, which would likely take place early in 2018. On 16 October, Lemieux's manager Camille Estephan stated the negotiations were going well for the fight and could possibly take place at the Bell Centre in Canada on 16 December 2017. He also stated that HBO were interested showcasing the fight. On 17 October, WBO confirmed the fight had been signed to take place at the new Place Bell in Laval, Quebec. Saunders won the bout, retaining his WBO title for the third time. The judges scored the fight 120–108, 117–111, and 118–110. Both HBO and ESPN scored it a clear 120–108 for Saunders. In the post-fight, Saunders called out Golovkin, "Golovkin, you keep saying you want my WBO belt. Fight me now. You'll be punching fresh air." CompuBox showed that Saunders landed 165 of 430 punches (38%) and Lemieux landed 67 of his 356 thrown (19%). Saunders earned a minimum $1 million purse while Lemieux took home a $500,000 guaranteed purse. The fight, which marked Saunders's first appearance on HBO, averaged 716,000 viewers, peaking at 775,000 viewers.

==== Inactivity ====
On 17 January 2018, Warren announced that Saunders would make a fourth defence of his WBO title at The O2 Arena in London, on the same card Terry Flanagan was to fight Maurice Hooker for the vacant WBO junior-lightweight title on 14 April. The bout would be a 'stay busy' fight for Saunders whilst Golovkin and Álvarez negotiate a rematch for May 2018. A few names listed as Saunders' potential opponents were Martin Murray, Conrad Cummings, Rafael Bejaran and Jason Quigley. Two days later, it was confirmed that 4-time world title challenger Murray (36–4–1, 17 KOs) would be Saunders next opponent, with the fight being billed as 'Battle of Britain' on BT Sport. On 20 March, Saunders suffered a hand injury in training forcing the card to be cancelled, however the fight was quickly rescheduled for 23 June 2018 at the same arena. On 3 June, Murray announced via his Instagram page that Saunders' had once again pulled out of the fight citing a hamstring injury. Saunders later tweeted, "You have your ups in boxing, but last three months have been downs, sorry to Martin and the fans, be back soon." Murray was not convinced about the injury as he stated Saunders had long been after a big money fight with either Canelo Álvarez or Gennady Golovkin.

On 20 June, it was reported that Saunders would fight in September 2018. The then-IBF super-middleweight champion James DeGale was rumoured to be his opponent, possibly at 168 pounds. On 12 July, the WBO ordered Saunders to make a mandatory defence against former two-time light-middleweight champion Demetrius Andrade (25–0, 16 KOs), with both sides having 10 days to reach a deal. On 13 July, it was reported that Andrade would be unveiled as one of Eddie Hearn's Matchroom Boxing USA's signing with a deal that would see him fighting on DAZN. On 17 July, at the official launch, Andrade was introduced as one of Matchroom Boxing USA's signings. On 25 July, the purse bid, which was scheduled for the evening, was cancelled after it was revealed that Eddie Hearn and Frank Warren had reached a deal for the fight to take place in USA under the Matchroom USA banner on DAZN. It was said that representatives of Top Rank were scheduled to be present at the purse bid to try and secure the fight for ESPN+. With Matchroom USA having promotional rights on the fight, Warren confirmed the fight would take place on Sky Sports in the United Kingdom and not BT Sport. On 9 August, according to Hearn, the fight would take place at the TD Garden in Boston, Massachusetts on 20 October.

On 27 September, ESPN's Dan Rafael first reported that Saunders had tested positive for oxilofrine, known as a stimulant. The test was carried out by the Voluntary Anti-Doping Association (VADA) on 30 August. VADA president Dr. Margaret Goodman reported, "The results of the analysis are as follows: Adverse. Urine specimen number 4248408: oxilofrine detected. Note the following is also contained on the laboratory report: 'Opinions: oxilofrine may have resulted from the administration of ephedrine which was also detected but below the decision limit of 11ug/ml. The estimated concentration of ephedrine is 4.6 ug/ml." Hearn stated he would wait to see if the Massachusetts commission will allow Saunders to fight, however confirmed Andrade would still appear in the main event, whether it be a vacant world title or a non-title bout. Promoter Warren claimed the positive test was due to a nasal spray and was permitted by UKAD. The BBBofC also stated Saunders was not in breach of their regulations. At a hearing, the MSAC denied Saunders a license, meaning he could not defend his title against Andrade. According to reports, the cancellation meant Saunders team would be losing around $2.3 million. WBO president, Paco Valcarcel told ESPN, Saunders would not be stripped immediately, as Saunders would likely appeal and Andrade's fight against Namibian boxer Walter Kautondokwa (17–0, 16 KOs), who at the time was ranked #2 with the WBO, would be for the vacant WBO interim title. On 11 October 2018, it was announced that Saunders had vacated the WBO middleweight title in anticipation of being stripped.

==== Ring return ====
On 12 December 2018, promoter Warren announced that Saunders would return to the ring on 22 December at the Manchester Arena on the Josh Warrington vs. Carl Frampton IBF featherweight championship undercard. It was later announced his opponent would be Hungarian boxer Zoltan Sera (32–17–1, 22 KOs). Sera was replaced days before the fight. Saunders' new opponent was revealed to be 41 year old veteran Charles Adamu (32–13, 25 KOs) from Ghana. Saunders weighed 178.5 pounds and Adamu came in at 173.2 pounds. Saunders won the fight after Adamu failed to come out from his corner after round four. Saunders was in complete control from the beginning. Adamu showed little offensive threat and eventually signalled to his corner that he could not continue after the fourth round.

=== Super-middleweight ===
==== Saunders vs. Isufi ====
On 22 January 2019, the WBO lifted Saunders's six month suspension and ordered Andrade vs. Saunders for the WBO title. On 18 February, Warren announced that Saunders would be moving up in weight and challenging for the vacant WBO super-middleweight title at the SSE Arena in London on 13 April. His opponent was scheduled to be German based Albanian Shefat Isufi. A week later, Gilberto Ramírez stated although he was scheduled to fight at the light heavyweight limit for his next bout, he had not vacated his super-middleweight title. There would be a chance he could return to the super-middleweight division. Upon hearing this, Saunders admitted his fight was now in jeopardy and was not sure he would fight Isufi, if the WBO title was not at stake.

On 12 March, it was reported that MTK Global had signed a deal with ESPN for them to broadcast 30 events a year. It was said that with this deal, Saunders would be co-promoted by Top Rank. It was rumoured around the same time that Saunders had split with trainer Dom Ingle and may be trained solely by Ben Davison. On 25 March, at a press conference, Saunders vs. Isufi (27–3–2, 20 KOs) was announced to take place for the interim WBO super-middleweight title on 18 May at Stevenage's Lamex Stadium. Warren believed the stadium would pack in around 15,000 fans seated on the stands and on the pitch. Saunders advised if he is victorious, he would likely challenge Ramírez for the full title in late 2019, however if Ramírez opted to remain at light-heavyweight, the winner of Saunders vs. Isufi would become full champion. Coming into the bout, Isufi was on a 10-fight win streak. The fight would air on BT Sport in the UK and streamed live on ESPN+ in the United States. On 25 March, Saunders confirmed he would be training with Ben Davison full-time. On 13 May, Ramírez officially vacated the WBO title, making Saunders vs. Isufi for the full world title. Saunders came in at the 168-pound limit and Isufi came in slightly lighter at 167.4 pounds.

Saunders defeated Isufi via a wide unanimous decision to become the WBO super-middleweight champion and becoming a two weight world champion. Saunders demonstrated effective control throughout the bout, showcasing his boxing skills by maintaining distance and landing well-timed combinations. He began the fight with a strong performance, utilizing jabs and moving smoothly around the ring. In the early rounds, Saunders clearly outperformed Isufi, who struggled to keep up with Saunders speed and evasive manoeuvres. Although Isufi connected with a significant right hand in the sixth round that forced Saunders to re-establish his distance, Saunders quickly regained the upper hand. The judges' scorecards reflected the dominance of Saunders, with final scores of 120–108, 118–110, and 117–111 in his favor. Saunders likened the fight to "sparring practice." He said, "I want the big fights. I want the big names out there, the big domestic fights, the unifications. I've moved up from middleweight because none of them wanted to fight me there." Frank Warren, his promoter, commended him for his remarkable footwork, anticipation, and speed, characterizing him as an underrated fighter. Warren expressed the opinion that, at his best, Saunders had the capability to compete successfully against top contenders such as Gennady Golovkin and Canelo Álvarez.

==== Saunders vs. Cóceres ====
In September 2019, it was announced that Saunders would make the first defence of his WBO super-middleweight title and his US debut on the KSI vs. Logan Paul II undercard. On 9 October, it was confirmed that Saunders would be fighting undefeated Marcelo Cóceres (28–0–1, 15 KOs) on 9 November. The event was to be carried by Sky Sports Box Office in the UK. The PPV event was at a lower price of £9.95. It was reported that Saunders would receive a $750,000 guaranteed purse and Cóceres was to collect a $80,000 purse. Saunders weighed just under the limit at 167¼ pounds and Cóceres weight on the 168 pound limit.

Cóceres gave Saunders, who was a 100–1 favorite, a tough fight through the first ten rounds, but in the eleventh, Saunders knocked Cóceres down three times, prompting referee Ray Corona to wave the fight off 1 minute 59 seconds into the penultimate round, securing the victory and successfully defending his WBO title. Saunders was not pleased with his performance. Speaking to DAZN's Chris Mannix, "Look, there's no excuse. That performance [is] not worthy of the Canelos, the Jacobs and the other big names. I came here five days before [the fight]. I'm not making excuses, but I knew, in my own heart, from round nine I have to get this man out of there ... Everything was just off tonight. I won, but you know, I wanted to impress the American crowd. I hope you enjoyed the knockout, because that's the only thing I can give you tonight. So, thank you very much." At the time of stoppage, Saunders was ahead on two of the judges scorecards at 96–94 and the remaining judge had it 96–94 for Coceres.

==== Saunders vs. Murray ====
On 23 October 2020, Matchroom Boxing announced Saunders would return to the ring after more than a year out to make the second defence of his WBO title against four-time world title challenger Martin Murray (39–5–1, 17 KOs) in the SSE Arena in London on 4 December, live on Sky Sports in the UK and on DAZN in other selected markets. On the announcement, Saunders said, "I am very happy to be defending my WBO World Title again. I haven't boxed for a year and I really do miss being in the ring. I can't wait to have my 30th professional fight and finish the year with a bang before a big 2021." The fight was originally scheduled in the past when Saunders was still contracted to Queensberry Promotions, but fell through following injuries. Murray explained there was no animosity between the pair and claimed there was frustration on his part after the previous fight was twice postponed. Saunders wanted to get in some rounds following more inactivity. His aim was to fight the winner of Canelo Álvarez vs. Callum Smith in 2021. Saunders weighed 167.3 pounds and Murray came in at 167.4 pounds.

Behind closed doors, in a one-sided fight, Saunders dominated Murray with a convincing lopsided unanimous decision victory, with the judges' scorecards reading 120–109, 120–109, 118–110 in his favour. The fight was forgetful, with Saunders hitting low blows, rabbit punches, and the use of his head, all without being docked any points. Murray fought behind his guard and was beaten to the punch throughout the fight. It took until round 4 for Saunders to have control off the bout and from there, it was all him. Saunders landed two left hands on Murray against the ropes, which dropped him to the canvas. The referee Phil Edwards did not rule it a knockdown. Sunders spoke on this after the fight, "It was definitely a knockdown. If that had been called a knockdown I would have adjusted and might have got the finish is there were 30–40 seconds left. Maybe that could have changed the complete fight." Jamie Moore warned Murray after the round that he wanted to see some offence or threaten to pull him out. Murray was more active in round 5, but after the round, it was the same as previous rounds. The referee had to get involved a number of times to warn the boxers are the fight wore on and got messy. After the fight, Murray hinted he would look at retiring, after nearly retiring in 2018. Saunders repeated what he'd like next saying, Let's get the big names out there. Obviously, Canelo and Smith are fighting. Andrade is out there. I need a big fight to get up for it. Any super-middleweight out there, let's get it on. People can criticise me all they want but I am here to fight. It has to be a big fight."

==== Saunders vs. Álvarez ====
On 28 February 2020, Canelo Álvarez's trainer Eddy Reynoso confirmed Saunders as the next opponent for the Mexican on 2 May, with a contract still to be finalised. Both undefeated super-middleweight champions Saunders and Callum Smith had both turned down offers to fight Álvarez, hoping to bargain for a better purse to fight the pound-for-pound star.

The fight was set to mark DAZN's global launch in Latin America (including Mexico), UK, and 189 other countries after previously being launched in nine countries. The bout was postponed due to the spread of the Coronavirus disease, while Canelo's team floated the possibility of a Golovkin trilogy late in 2020 that might conflict with the Saunders fight.

After Álvarez's successful title defence against Avni Yıldırım on 27 February 2021, Eddie Hearn, the promoter of both Saunders and Álvarez, confirmed a unification bout on 8 May 2021 for Saunders' WBO title, and Álvarez's WBA (Super), WBC and The Ring titles.

With 73,126 fans in attendance at AT&T Stadium in Arlington, Texas, a record amount for an indoor boxing event in the US, Saunders was hit with an uppercut towards the end of the eighth round, causing immediate swelling to his right eye. Saunders had boxed well to this point, generally being able to avoid Canelo's bigger shots. While sitting on his stool at the end of the round, he informed his trainer Mark Tibbs that he could not see, prompting Tibbs to call a halt to the contest, handing Saunders the first defeat of his career. At the time of the stoppage, Saunders was behind on the judges' scorecards with 78–74 (twice) and 77–75. Hearn revealed after the fight that Saunders had suffered multiple fractures to his eye socket and was awaiting surgery. According to Mike Coppinger, Saunders was guaranteed a $2.5 million purse and received a career-high $8 million payday, while Alvarez was guaranteed $15 million, which could increase up to $35 million after his PPV share.

== Controversies ==
In September 2018, a then-29-year-old Saunders was caught on camera pretending to be a police officer and forcing a man to strip naked in his car. Saunders can be heard telling the driver to remove his shirt, trousers and the rest of his clothes because he thought he "had a weapon."

A video of Saunders in his Rolls-Royce taunting a drug addict, offering £150 of crack cocaine to perform a sex act or punch a passer-by, was released on 17 September 2018. The woman punched a man walking past and Saunders then drove away from the scene. A second video then surfaced of him calling another woman "a prostitute", and stating "we don't wanna get the clap off you". The General Secretary of the British Boxing Board of Control (BBBofC), Robert Smith, responded: "I have just seen the videos and I can tell you we find it disgusting. I am speaking to members of the board now. I am keen to get on with this as soon as possible." The incidents were investigated. The BBBofC found Saunders "guilty of bringing the sport into disrepute'", issued him a severe reprimand, and fined him £100,000.

In March 2020, Saunders was alleged to have made a phone call to Delta Air Lines claiming that three other boxers on a flight from Las Vegas to New York were infected with COVID-19. The call resulted in the trio's removal from the flight. An audio clip of the call circulated on social media in which Saunders was heard laughing about the incident. Later in March, Saunders posted an online video instructing men how to hit their female partners whilst in isolation due to the coronavirus pandemic. In the video Saunders uses a punch bag to explain how to react if "your old woman is giving you mouth" and showing how to "hit her on the chin". He later posted a follow-up video stating the video was intended as a joke, apologised for any offence caused, and stated he would donate £25,000 to a domestic violence charity. Due to the video, Saunders's boxing licence was suspended by the BBBofC pending investigation. In July 2020, the BBBofC found him guilty of misconduct and fined him £15,000. His suspension was then lifted.

On 28 November 2021, a video surfaced online via YouTube of a man claiming that Saunders stabbed his 18-year-old son in the hand after a street fight. The man also alleges that Saunders pulled out a gun and pointed it at his other son, but hesitated to fire it. Saunders released a statement days later via his Instagram account, labelling the accusations as "complete rubbish" while also saying that he would "make no public comment at this stage" acting on the advice of his lawyer.

Saunders has also received attention for his links to reputed Irish crime boss Daniel Kinahan, who was Saunders's advisor. Saunders has publicly criticised the British and Irish media for their coverage of Kinahan, releasing statements in his defence.

=== Hare coursing offence ===
In 2025, Saunders was convicted of hare coursing, attempting to catch and kill hares using dogs. This followed the arrest of him and two others for this in 2024 in Lincolnshire. Lincolnshire Police released body camera footage of the arrests, during which Saunders repeatedly swore, shouting personal abuse at the officers. Hare coursing videos showing dogs catching a hare were found on his mobile. He and the others were sentenced to have the dogs removed from them, to pay kennel fees for the dogs, to have the car which Saunders was driving at the time removed, banned from keeping dogs for five years and from entering Lincolnshire with dogs during the season for hare coursing. Saunders was also sentenced to sixty hours of unpaid work and made subject to a criminal behaviour order for five years.

== Personal life ==
Saunders is a father of two sons, both born to his former girlfriend Ruby. He is a friend of former heavyweight champion Tyson Fury.

== Professional boxing record ==
31 fights	30 wins	1 loss
By knockout	14	1
By decision	16	0

No.	Result	Record	Opponent	Type	Round, time	Date	Location	Notes
31	Loss	30–1	Canelo Álvarez	RTD	8 (12), 3:00	8 May 2021	AT&T Stadium, Arlington, Texas, US	Lost WBO super-middleweight title; For WBA (Super), WBC, and The Ring super-middleweight titles
30	Win	30–0	Martin Murray	UD	12	4 Dec 2020	The SSE Arena, London, England	Retained WBO super-middleweight title
29	Win	29–0	Marcelo Cóceres	KO	11 (12), 1:59	9 Nov 2019	Staples Center, Los Angeles, California, US	Retained WBO super-middleweight title
28	Win	28–0	Shefat Isufi	UD	12	18 May 2019	Lamex Stadium, Stevenage, England	Won vacant WBO super-middleweight title
27	Win	27–0	Charles Adamu	RTD	4 (8), 3:00	22 Dec 2018	Manchester Arena, Manchester, England	
26	Win	26–0	David Lemieux	UD	12	16 Dec 2017	Place Bell, Laval, Quebec, Canada	Retained WBO middleweight title
25	Win	25–0	Willie Monroe Jr.	UD	12	16 Sep 2017	Copper Box Arena, London, England	Retained WBO middleweight title
24	Win	24–0	Artur Akavov	UD	12	3 Dec 2016	Lagoon Leisure Centre, Paisley, Scotland	Retained WBO middleweight title
23	Win	23–0	Andy Lee	MD	12	19 Dec 2015	Manchester Arena, Manchester, England	Won WBO middleweight title
22	Win	22–0	Yoann Bloyer	TKO	4 (12), 0:53	24 Jul 2015	The SSE Arena, London, England	
21	Win	21–0	Chris Eubank Jr.	SD	12	29 Nov 2014	ExCeL, London, England	Retained European, British, and Commonwealth middleweight titles
20	Win	20–0	Emanuele Blandamura	KO	8 (12), 2:58	26 Jul 2014	Manchester Arena, Manchester, England	Won vacant European middleweight title
19	Win	19–0	John Ryder	UD	12	21 Sep 2013	Copper Box Arena, London, England	Retained British and Commonwealth middleweight titles
18	Win	18–0	Gary O'Sullivan	UD	12	20 Jul 2013	Wembley Arena, London, England	Won WBO International middleweight title
17	Win	17–0	Matthew Hall	UD	12	21 Mar 2013	York Hall, London, England	Retained British and Commonwealth middleweight titles
16	Win	16–0	Nick Blackwell	UD	12	15 Dec 2012	ExCeL, London, England	Retained Commonwealth middleweight title; Won vacant British middleweight title
15	Win	15–0	Jarrod Fletcher	TKO	2 (12), 2:42	14 Sep 2012	York Hall, London, England	Retained Commonwealth middleweight title
14	Win	14–0	Bradley Pryce	UD	12	1 Jun 2012	York Hall, London, England	Retained Commonwealth middleweight title
13	Win	13–0	Tony Hill	TKO	1 (10), 0:30	28 Apr 2012	Royal Albert Hall, London, England	Won vacant Commonwealth middleweight title
12	Win	12–0	Tommy Tolan	TKO	1 (8), 1:07	14 Dec 2011	York Hall, London, England	
11	Win	11–0	Gary Boulden	PTS	10	5 Nov 2011	Wembley Arena, London, England	Won Southern Area middleweight title
10	Win	10–0	Norbert Szekeres	TKO	1 (8), 2:51	15 Oct 2011	Echo Arena, Liverpool, England	
9	Win	9–0	Kevin Hammond	TKO	2 (8), 3:00	21 May 2011	The O2 Arena, London, England	
8	Win	8–0	Turgay Uzun	RTD	2 (8), 3:00	2 Apr 2011	York Hall, London, England	
7	Win	7–0	Tony Randell	TKO	2 (6), 0:39	11 Dec 2010	Echo Arena, Liverpool, England	
6	Win	6–0	Andy Butlin	PTS	6	15 May 2010	Boleyn Ground, London, England	
5	Win	5–0	Lee Noble	PTS	6	5 Dec 2009	Metro Radio Arena, Newcastle, England	
4	Win	4–0	Alex Spitko	PTS	4	9 Oct 2009	York Hall, London, England	
3	Win	3–0	Matt Scriven	TKO	2 (4), 1:21	18 Jul 2009	MEN Arena, Manchester, England	
2	Win	2–0	Ronny Gabel	TKO	2 (4), 1:16	15 May 2009	Odyssey Arena, Belfast, Northern Ireland	
1	Win	1–0	Attila Molnar	TKO	2 (4), 1:47	28 Feb 2009	National Indoor Arena, Birmingham, England	

== Titles in boxing ==
=== Major world titles ===
- WBO middleweight champion (160 lbs)
- WBO super-middleweight champion (168 lbs)

=== Regional/International titles ===
- Southern Area middleweight champion (160 lbs)
- Commonwealth middleweight champion (160 lbs)
- British middleweight champion (160 lbs)
- European middleweight champion (160 lbs)
- WBO International middleweight champion (160 lbs)

Sporting positions
Regional boxing titles
Preceded by Gary Boulden	Southern Area middleweight champion 5 November 2011 – April 2012; Vacated	Vacant Title next held by Elliott Matthews
Vacant Title last held by Martin Murray	Commonwealth middleweight champion 28 April 2012 – 19 December 2015; Vacated	Vacant Title next held by Tommy Langford
Vacant Title last held by Martin Murray	British middleweight champion 15 December 2012 – 12 March 2015; Vacated	Vacant Title next held by Nick Blackwell
Vacant Title last held by Vitor Sa	WBO International middleweight champion 20 July 2013 – September 2013; Vacated	Vacant Title next held by Antoine Douglas
Vacant Title last held by Max Bursak	European middleweight champion 26 July 2014 – 7 March 2015; Vacated	Vacant Title next held by Michel Soro
World boxing titles
Preceded by Andy Lee	WBO middleweight champion 19 December 2015 – 11 October 2018; Vacated	Vacant Title next held by Demetrius Andrade
Vacant Title last held by Gilberto Ramírez	WBO super-middleweight champion 18 May 2019 – 8 May 2021	Succeeded by Canelo Álvarez
