= Nick Blackwell =

British boxer (born 1990)

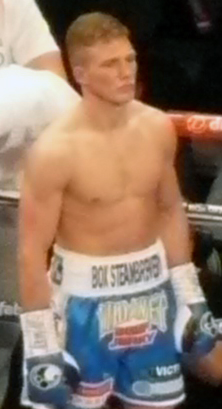
- Blackwell in 2015

Personal information
- Nickname: Bang Bang
- Nationality: British
- Born: 27 October 1990 (age 35) Trowbridge, Wiltshire, England
- Height: 5 ft 10 in (178 cm)
- Weight: Middleweight

Boxing career
- Reach: 71 in (180 cm)
- Stance: Orthodox

Boxing record
- Total fights: 24
- Wins: 19
- Win by KO: 8
- Losses: 4
- Draws: 1

Nick Blackwell (born 27 October 1990) is a British former professional boxer who competed from 2009 to 2016. He won the English middleweight title in 2010, at the age of twenty, becoming the youngest boxer to do so. In 2011 and 2012 he challenged for the Commonwealth middleweight title, and won the British middleweight title in 2015. Blackwell's career was cut short in 2016 after he was forced to retire due to a serious head injury sustained in the ring.

== Professional career ==
Blackwell turned professional on 26 June 2009, having had no amateur experience and spending his teenage years in the sport in white-collar boxing. He won his first regional title on 20 November 2010, scoring a ten-round unanimous decision against Harry Matthews to become the youngest ever English middleweight champion at twenty years old. On 18 June 2011, Blackwell challenged Martin Murray for his Commonwealth middleweight title, as well as the vacant British middleweight title. Murray handed Blackwell his first career defeat when the latter was pulled out by his corner at the end of round five. A successful defence of the English middleweight title came on 3 March 2012, with Blackwell stopping Martin Concepcion in four rounds.

On 15 December 2012, Blackwell received a second opportunity at the Commonwealth title, this time against defending champion Billy Joe Saunders; the vacant British title was also on the line. This turned out to be a tough outing for Saunders, as Blackwell forced him to go the full twelve rounds. Saunders nonetheless won a unanimous decision on the judges' scorecards, handing Blackwell his second career defeat. Blackwell travelled to Ukraine on 21 September 2013 to fight for the vacant WBA Continental (Europe) middleweight title, but lost a twelve-round unanimous decision to Max Bursak. During the fight, Blackwell scored a knockdown in the fourth round, and the result was seen by some observers as controversial.

Having begun training with former middleweight world title challenger Gary Lockett, Blackwell made a third attempt at the vacant British title on 30 May 2015 against John Ryder. Blackwell achieved his most significant win, on a prominent stage at The O2 Arena in London, by stopping Ryder in seven rounds to become the British middleweight champion. Two successful title defences were made in the remainder of 2015, against Damon Jones on 25 July (sixth-round stoppage), and Jack Arnfield on 14 November (unanimous decision).

=== Blackwell vs. Eubank Jr. match and retirement ===
In his third title defence on 26 March 2016 at Wembley Arena, which would have won him the Lonsdale Belt outright, Blackwell lost to Chris Eubank Jr. In a fast-paced fight, Eubank Jr. dominated the action using hard hooks and uppercuts, which eventually led to a bloody nose and a large swelling above Blackwell's left eye. Following the mid-way point and in the corner between rounds, Chris Eubank Sr. was heard to instruct his son to refrain from punching Blackwell in the head.

In the tenth round the referee summoned the ringside doctor to assess Blackwell, who in turn deemed him unable to continue due to the swelling on his head obstructing his vision, therefore handing Eubank Jr. the victory and title. Some minutes after the fight was stopped, Blackwell was given oxygen and taken out of the arena by stretcher. He was later taken to St Mary's Hospital with bleeding of the skull (outside the brain) and placed in a medically-induced coma, but an operation was not deemed necessary. The following weekend, he was brought out of the coma. In April 2016, Blackwell announced his retirement from boxing via Twitter, but expressed his desire to be involved in the sport in some capacity.

== Life after boxing ==
On 23 May 2016, Blackwell criticised the reaction of Eubank Jr. and his father, following the British middleweight clash which left him fighting for his life. Blackwell was said to have been hurt by the reaction of the Eubanks in the immediate aftermath, despite turning to Twitter to first claim there were no hard feelings. Speaking to ITV's Good Morning Britain, "I was just a little disappointed. If Eubank was in that situation, and he was in a coma, I would want to go and see him. The whole thing with the press conference [which the Eubanks held three days after the fight], my family had begged them not to do it and they still went ahead." He added, "Anyone in boxing knows it was more of a tactical thing. He couldn't stop me to the head so he wanted to hit me to the body to try and get rid of me."

Following Blackwell's comments, Eubank Jr. said he was shocked at the criticism he and his father received for holding a press conference when Blackwell was in an induced coma. Eubank Jr. said, "I can understand where this anger and dislike for me can come from. The truth is, I ended the guy's career. I've stopped him from making a living." He had believed there was no hard feelings about what happened, despite Blackwell's claims to the contrary.

In October 2016, Blackwell received a boxing trainer's licence. In late November, he was again taken to hospital after falling seriously ill during a sparring session, where an operation performed to reduce swelling on his brain. An investigation of the events was conducted by the British Boxing Board of Control, following which cruiserweight boxer Hasan Karkardi and his trainer were both suspended from their roles after their involvement in the incident. Blackwell's former trainer Gary Lockett was unaware of the sparring session. Blackwell's brother Daniel confirmed that he regained consciousness from the coma on 23 December.

In June 2018, Blackwell made his first public appearance following the ill-fated sparring session, in support of his friend Tyson Fury at the press conference for his fight against Deontay Wilder later that year. Blackwell said his recovery was ongoing and that he had used a wheelchair for a long time.

== Professional boxing record ==
24 fights	19 wins	4 losses
By knockout	8	2
By decision	11	2
Draws	1	

No.	Result	Record	Opponent	Type	Round, time	Date	Location	Notes
24	Loss	19–4–1	Chris Eubank Jr.	TKO	10 (12), 2:21	26 Mar 2016	The SSE Arena Wembley, London, England	Lost British middleweight title
23	Win	19–3–1	Jack Arnfield	UD	12	14 Nov 2015	City Academy, Bristol, England	Retained British middleweight title
22	Win	18–3–1	Damon Jones	TKO	6 (12), 3:00	25 Jul 2015	Derby Arena, Derby, England	Retained British middleweight title
21	Win	17–3–1	John Ryder	TKO	7 (12), 2:36	30 May 2015	The O2 Arena, London, England	Won vacant British middleweight title
20	Win	16–3–1	Nathan King	PTS	8	8 Nov 2014	Bluewater, Stone, England	
19	Draw	15–3–1	Sergey Khomitsky	MD	6	25 Oct 2014	Salle des Etoiles, Monte Carlo, Monaco	
18	Win	15–3	Terry Carruthers	PTS	10	5 Apr 2014	The Forum, Bath, England	
17	Win	14–3	Max Maxwell	PTS	8	26 Oct 2013	Civic Hall, Trowbridge, England	
16	Loss	13–3	Max Bursak	UD	12	21 Sep 2013	Lokomotyv Sports Palace, Kharkiv, Ukraine	For vacant WBA Continental (Europe) middleweight title
15	Win	13–2	Ruslans Pojonisevs	PTS	6	2 Mar 2013	Civic Hall, Trowbridge, England	
14	Loss	12–2	Billy Joe Saunders	UD	12	15 Dec 2012	ExCeL, London, England	For Commonwealth and vacant British middleweight titles
13	Win	12–1	Mikheil Khutsishvili	RTD	1 (10), 3:00	25 May 2012	Civic Hall, Trowbridge, England	Won vacant WBC Youth Silver middleweight title
12	Win	11–1	Martin Concepcion	TKO	4 (10), 2:28	3 Feb 2012	Civic Hall, Trowbridge, England	Retained English middleweight title
11	Win	10–1	Robert Blazo	TKO	7 (10), 2:44	17 Dec 2011	Civic Hall, Trowbridge, England	
10	Win	9–1	Mihai Macovei	TKO	5 (6), 2:00	30 Sep 2011	Oasis Leisure Centre, Swindon, England	
9	Loss	8–1	Martin Murray	RTD	5 (12), 3:00	18 Jun 2011	Robin Park Arena, Wigan, England	For WBA Inter-Continental, Commonwealth, and vacant British middleweight titles
8	Win	8–0	Andrejs Loginovs	TKO	4 (6), 1:46	30 Apr 2011	Olympiad Leisure Centre, Chippenham, England	
7	Win	7–0	Harry Matthews	UD	10	20 Nov 2010	Twerton Park, Bath, England	Won vacant English middleweight title
6	Win	6–0	Luke Osman	PTS	6	16 Oct 2010	Olympiad Leisure Centre, Chippenham, England	
5	Win	5–0	Tomas Grublys	PTS	6	23 Apr 2010	Oasis Leisure Centre, Swindon, England	
4	Win	4–0	Darren Gethin	PTS	4	26 Mar 2010	Civic Hall, Trowbridge, England	
3	Win	3–0	Chris Brophy	PTS	6	4 Oct 2009	Marriott Hotel, Bristol, England	
2	Win	2–0	Davy Jones	PTS	6	11 Sep 2009	Civic Hall, Trowbridge, England	
1	Win	1–0	Dave Sadler	TKO	3 (6), 1:14	26 Jun 2009	Christie Miller Sports Centre, Melksham, England	

Sporting positions
Regional boxing titles
Vacant Title last held by Darren McDermott	English middleweight champion 20 November 2010 – 2 June 2012; Vacated	Vacant Title next held by Kreshnik Qato
New title	WBC Silver Youth middleweight champion 15 December 2012 – 3 October 2013; Vacated	Vacant Title next held by Marat Kulumbegov
Vacant Title last held by Billy Joe Saunders	British middleweight champion 30 May 2015 – 26 March 2016	Succeeded by Chris Eubank Jr.
