= Max Bursak =

Ukrainian boxer

Personal information
- Nicknames: The Tiger; Mad Max
- Nationality: Ukrainian
- Born: Maksym Bursak; 3 July 1984 (age 42) Kyiv, Ukrainian SSR, Soviet Union
- Height: 1.83 m (6 ft 0 in)
- Weight: Middleweight; Super-middleweight

Boxing career
- Reach: 180 cm (71 in)
- Stance: Orthodox

Boxing record
- Total fights: 45
- Wins: 37
- Win by KO: 16
- Losses: 6
- Draws: 2

Maksym Bursak (born 3 July 1984) is a Ukrainian professional boxer. He held the European middleweight title in 2013, and has challenged once for the WBO super-middleweight title in 2017.

== Professional career ==
Bursak made his professional debut on 16 June 2004 against Viacheslav Kusov, who also debuted. Their fight ended in a four-round points draw. For the next eight years Bursak would remain undefeated, scoring wins over perennial middleweight contender Brian Vera and future world champion Giovanni De Carolis. Bursak fought for his first major world championship—the vacant WBO interim title—against Hassan N'Dam N'Jikam on 4 May 2012, but lost via wide unanimous decision (UD).

On 2 February 2013, Bursak stopped Julien Marie Sainte in three rounds to become the European middleweight champion. He made one defence of the title on 13 July 2013, scoring a UD over Prince Arron. After vacating the title, Bursak next fought Nick Blackwell on 21 September 2013. Despite being knocked down in round four, Bursak won a disputed twelve-round UD.

2014 would be less successful for Bursak: on 1 February he lost a twelve-round UD to Jarrod Fletcher, which was followed by another UD loss to Martin Murray on 21 June; in the latter fight, the vacant WBC Silver middleweight title was on the line. A second opportunity for Bursak to win a world championship—the vacant IBO super-middleweight title–came on 27 June 2015, against Zac Dunn. Having travelled far away to Australia from his native Ukraine, Bursak lost via UD.

== Professional boxing record ==
45 fights	37 wins	6 losses
By knockout	16	0
By decision	21	6
Draws	2	

No.	Result	Record	Opponent	Type	Round, time	Date	Location	Notes
41	Draw	34–5–2	Mukhitdin Rajapbaev	MD	8	22 Dec 2018	Ice Arena TEC Terminal, Brovary, Ukraine	
40	Win	34–5–1	Soso Abuladze	UD	8	16 Dec 2017	Ice Arena TEC Terminal, Brovary, Ukraine	
39	Loss	33–5–1	Gilberto Ramírez	UD	12	22 Apr 2017	StubHub Center, Carson, California, US	For WBO super-middleweight title
38	Win	33–4–1	Ruslan Schelev	UD	8	23 Apr 2016	Palace of Sports, Kyiv, Ukraine	
37	Win	32–4–1	Giorgi Beroshvili	KO	2 (8), 2:12	12 Dec 2015	Palace of Sports, Kyiv, Ukraine	
36	Loss	31–4–1	Zac Dunn	UD	12	26 Jun 2015	Royal Exhibition Building, Carlton, Australia	For vacant IBO super-middleweight title
35	Win	31–3–1	Chris Herrmann	TKO	1 (8), 2:22	18 Apr 2015	Palace of Sports, Kyiv, Ukraine	
34	Win	30–3–1	Ramazi Gogichashvili	TKO	2 (8), 1:50	22 Nov 2014	Ice Arena TEC Terminal, Brovary, Ukraine	For International Boxing Council middleweight title
33	Loss	29–3–1	Martin Murray	UD	12	21 Jun 2014	Salle Médecin, Monte Carlo, Monaco	For vacant WBC Silver middleweight title
32	Loss	29–2–1	Jarrod Fletcher	UD	12	1 Feb 2014	Salle des Etoiles, Monte Carlo, Monaco	For vacant WBA International middleweight title
31	Win	29–1–1	Gary Abajyan	UD	8	14 Dec 2013	Ice Arena TEC Terminal, Brovary, Ukraine	
30	Win	28–1–1	Nick Blackwell	UD	12	21 Sep 2013	Sports Palace "Lokomotyv", Kharkiv, Ukraine	Won vacant WBA Continental (Europe) middleweight title
29	Win	27–1–1	Prince Arron	UD	12	13 Jul 2013	Salle des Etoiles, Monte Carlo, Monaco	Retained European middleweight title
28	Win	26–1–1	Julien Marie Sainte	TKO	3 (12)	2 Feb 2013	Palace of Sports, Kyiv, Ukraine	Won vacant European middleweight title
27	Win	25–1–1	Sergei Melis	TKO	1 (8), 2:20	21 Jul 2012	Sports Palace, Odessa, Ukraine	
26	Loss	24–1–1	Hassan N'Dam N'Jikam	UD	12	4 May 2012	Palais des sports Marcel-Cerdan, Paris, France	For vacant WBO interim middleweight title
25	Win	24–0–1	Laatekwei Hammond	TKO	3 (12), 1:24	17 Dec 2011	Restaurant Grodno, Grodno, Belarus	Retained WBO Inter-Continental middleweight title
24	Win	23–0–1	Abdulaziz Matazimov	TKO	3 (8)	22 Oct 2011	Sportpalace Budivelnik, Cherkasy, Ukraine	
23	Win	22–0–1	Carlos Adan Jerez	UD	12	28 May 2011	Concert Hall "Kobzov", Kyiv, Ukraine	Retained WBO Inter-Continental middleweight title
22	Win	21–0–1	Brian Vera	UD	12	4 Sep 2010	Sports Complex Meteor, Dnipropetrovsk, Ukraine	Retained WBO Inter-Continental middleweight title
21	Win	20–0–1	Marco Schulze	TKO	8 (12)	24 Apr 2010	Palace of Sports, Kyiv, Ukraine	Won vacant WBO Inter-Continental middleweight title
20	Win	19–0–1	Sergey Khomitsky	UD	10	21 Oct 2009	Palace of Sports, Kyiv, Ukraine	
19	Win	18–0–1	Alexander Sipos	TKO	4 (10)	30 May 2006	Palace of Sports, Kyiv, Ukraine	
18	Win	17–0–1	Levan Shonia	UD	10	26 Feb 2009	Palace of Sports, Kyiv, Ukraine	
17	Win	16–0–1	Esteban Waldemar Ponce	TKO	8 (10)	27 Sep 2008	Palace of Sports, Kyiv, Ukraine	Retained IBF Youth middleweight title
16	Win	15–0–1	Giovanni De Carolis	TKO	8 (10)	14 Jun 2008	Palace of Sports, Kyiv, Ukraine	Retained IBF Youth middleweight title
15	Win	14–0–1	Mikheil Khutsishvili	TKO	7 (10)	19 Apr 2008	Palace of Sports, Kyiv, Ukraine	Won vacant IBF Youth middleweight title
14	Win	13–0–1	Volodymyr Borovskyy	UD	8	21 Feb 2008	Palace of Sports, Kyiv, Ukraine	
13	Win	12–0–1	Andrey Tylilyuk	TKO	5 (8)	17 Nov 2007	SC Voskhod, Kyiv, Ukraine	
12	Win	11–0–1	George Khulelidze	TKO	1 (8)	13 Sep 2007	Palace of Sports, Kyiv, Ukraine	
11	Win	10–0–1	Tagir Rzaev	UD	8	9 Jun 2007	Palace of Sports, Kyiv, Ukraine	
10	Win	9–0–1	Sergey Gribkov	TKO	8 (8)	26 Apr 2007	SC Voskhod, Kyiv, Ukraine	
9	Win	8–0–1	Rostyslav Kitun	UD	6	19 Dec 2006	SC Voskhod, Kyiv, Ukraine	
8	Win	7–0–1	Siarhei Navarka	UD	6	23 Sep 2006	Palace of Sports, Kyiv, Ukraine	
7	Win	6–0–1	Ruslan Semenov	UD	6	8 Apr 2006	ACCO International, Kyiv, Ukraine	
6	Win	5–0–1	Artem Makohonenko	UD	6	2 Mar 2006	Circus, Lviv, Ukraine	
5	Win	4–0–1	Maksym Velychko	UD	6	16 Sep 2005	Sports Complex Meteor, Dnipropetrovsk, Ukraine	
4	Win	3–0–1	Taras Boyko	SD	6	7 May 2005	Sports Palace "Lokomotyv", Kharkiv, Ukraine	
3	Win	2–0–1	Dmytro Madulu	MD	6	13 Feb 2005	Freedom Nightclub, Kyiv, Ukraine	
2	Win	1–0–1	Pavlo Sukmanskyy	UD	6	9 Jul 2004	Chernivtsi, Ukraine	
1	Draw	0–0–1	Aleksandr Chuvirov	PTS	4	16 Jun 2004	Freedom Nightclub, Kyiv, Ukraine	

Sporting positions
Regional boxing titles
Vacant Title last held by Nikola Stevanović	IBF Youth middleweight champion 19 April 2008 – March 2009; Vacated	Vacant Title next held by Dominik Britsch
Vacant Title last held by Gennady Golovkin	WBO Inter-Continental middleweight champion 24 April 2010 – 4 May 2012; Lost bid for interim title	Vacant Title next held by Hamid Rahimi
Vacant Title last held by Grzegorz Proksa	European middleweight champion 2 February 2013 – September 2013; Vacated	Vacant Title next held by Billy Joe Saunders
New title	WBA Continental (Europe) middleweight champion 21 September 2013 – 1 February 2014; Lost bid for International title	Vacant Title next held by David Papot
