= Antoine Douglas =

American boxer

Personal information
- Nickname: Action
- Born: September 4, 1992 (age 33) Burke, Virginia, U.S.
- Height: 6 ft 0 in (183 cm)
- Weight: Middleweight

Boxing career
- Reach: 74 in (188 cm)
- Stance: Orthodox

Boxing record
- Total fights: 25
- Wins: 22
- Win by KO: 16
- Losses: 2
- Draws: 1

Antoine Douglas (born September 4, 1992) is an American professional boxer.

On July 25, 2014 Douglas fought to a draw against Michel Soro.

On March 5, 2016 Douglas lost to Avtandil Khurtsidze.

On March 27, 2017 Douglas defeated Eduardo Mercedes to win the WBC FECARBOX middleweight title.

On December 16, 2017 Douglas lost to Gary O'Sullivan.

== Professional boxing record ==
25 fights	22 wins	2 losses
By knockout	16	2
By decision	6	0
Draws	1	

Result	Record	Opponent	Type	Round, time	Date	Location	Notes
Loss	22–2–1	(Republic of Ireland) Gary O'Sullivan	KO	7 (10)	2017-12-16	(Canada) Place Bell, Laval	Loss WBA-NABA Middleweight Title. For vacant WBO Inter-Continental Middleweight Title
Win	22–1–1	(Colombia) Juan De Angel	KO	4 (10)	2017-07-14	(United States) Buffalo Run Casino, Miami	Won vacant WBA-NABA Middleweight Title
Win	21–1–1	(Dominican Republic) Eduardo Mercedes	UD	12	2014-02-01	(Dominican Republic) Montevar las Colinas Discotheque, Santiago de los Caballeros	Won vacant WBC FECARBOX Middleweight Title
Win	20–1–1	(Mexico) Pablo Munguia	KO	2 (10)	2017-03-11	(United States) Cypress Bayou Casino, Charenton	
Loss	19–1–1	(Georgia (country)) Avtandil Khurtsidze	TKO	10 (10)	2016-03-05	(United States) Sands Bethlehem Event Center, Bethlehem	
