= Tony Hill (boxer) =

British former professional boxer (born 1986)

Personal information
- Nationality: British
- Weight: Middleweight; Light-heavyweight

Boxing career
- Stance: Southpaw

Boxing record
- Total fights: 17
- Wins: 13
- Win by KO: 6
- Losses: 3
- Draws: 1

Tony Hill is a British former professional boxer who competed from 2009 to 2014, and challenged once for the Commonwealth middleweight title in 2012.

== Professional career ==
He made his professional debut on 11 September 2009, scoring a first-round stoppage over Stuart Barr. On 28 April 2012, Hill fought Billy Joe Saunders for the vacant Commonwealth middleweight title, but was stopped in thirty seconds of the first round.

== Professional boxing record ==
16 fights	13 wins	3 losses
By knockout	6	1
By decision	7	2

No.	Result	Record	Opponent	Type	Round, time	Date	Location	Notes
17	Win	13–3–1	Tzvetozar Iliev	PTS	6	18 Oct 2014	Fleming Park Leisure Centre, Eastleigh, England	
16	Draw	12–3–1	Leon Senior	TD	2 (10), 0:21	15 Mar 2014	Rivermead Leisure Centre, Reading, England	For British Southern Area light-heavyweight title; Points TD after Hill was cut from an accidental head clash
15	Win	12–3	Tomas Kugler	TKO	2 (6), 1:12	16 Nov 2013	Guildhall, Southampton, England	
14	Win	11–3	Vygaudas Laurinkus	PTS	6	8 Jun 2013	Guildhall, Winchester, England	
13	Win	10–3	Andrejs Loginovs	PTS	6	30 Nov 2012	Guildhall, Southampton, England	
12	Win	9–3	Kelvin Young	KO	3 (10), 1:45	6 Oct 2012	Oasis Leisure Centre, Swindon, England	
11	Loss	8–3	Billy Joe Saunders	TKO	1 (12), 0:30	28 Apr 2012	Royal Albert Hall, London, England	For vacant Commonwealth middleweight title
10	Loss	8–2	Kerry Hope	MD	10	22 Oct 2011	Reebok Stadium, Bolton, England	
9	Win	8–1	Paul Samuels	TKO	2 (6), 0:42	13 May 2011	Medway Park Sports Centre, Gillingham, England	
8	Win	7–1	Daniel Borisov	TKO	2 (6), 2:50	26 Mar 2011	Oceana, Southampton, England	
7	Win	6–1	Kevin Concepcion	TKO	1, 2:48	16 Oct 2010	Troxy, London, England	
6	Win	5–1	Phillip Townley	PTS	6	25 Jun 2010	Brentwood Centre, Brentwood, England	
5	Loss	4–1	Matt Hainy	PTS	4	23 Apr 2010	SkyDome Arena, Coventry, England	
4	Win	4–0	Alex Spitko	PTS	4	22 Jan 2010	Brentwood Centre, Brentwood, England	
3	Win	3–0	Luke Osman	PTS	4	11 Dec 2009	Newport Centre, Newport, Wales	
2	Win	2–0	Matt Scriven	PTS	4	20 Nov 2009	Harvey Hadden Leisure Centre, Nottingham, England	
1	Win	1–0	Stuart Barr	TKO	1 (4), 2:36	11 Sep 2009	Brentwood Centre, Brentwood, England	
