= Damon Jones (boxer) =

British professional boxer (born 1993)

Personal information
- Nationality: British
- Born: 17 March 1993 (age 33) Leeds, West Yorkshire, England
- Height: 6 ft 0 in (183 cm)
- Weight: Light-middleweight; Middleweight

Boxing career
- Stance: Southpaw

Boxing record
- Total fights: 19
- Wins: 16
- Win by KO: 3
- Losses: 2
- No contests: 1

Damon Jones (born 17 March 1993) is a British professional boxer who has challenged once for the British middleweight title.

== Amateur career ==
Jones won the 2011 Amateur Boxing Association British welterweight title, when boxing out of the West Leeds ABC.

== Professional career ==
Jones made his professional debut on 10 March 2012, winning a round-round points decision against Liam Griffiths. On 25 July 2015, Jones fought for his first major regional championship—the British middleweight title—but was stopped in six rounds by defending champion Nick Blackwell.

=== Professional record ===
| 18 fights | 15 wins | 2 losses |
|---|---|---|
| By knockout | 3 | 2 |
| By decision | 12 | 0 |
| No contests | 1 | |

| No. | Result | Record | Opponent | Type | Round, time | Date | Location | Notes |
|---|---|---|---|---|---|---|---|---|
| 18 | Loss | 15–2 (1) | James Metcalf | TKO | 6 (10) | 21 Oct 2017 | First Direct Arena, Leeds, England | |
| 17 | Win | 15–1 (1) | Darryl Sharp | PTS | 6 | 3 Mar 2017 | John Charles Centre for Sport, Leeds, England | |
| 16 | Win | 14–1 (1) | Simone Lucas | PTS | 6 | 18 Mar 2016 | Elland Road Banqueting Suite, Leeds, England | |
| 15 | Loss | 13–1 (1) | Nick Blackwell | TKO | 6 (12), 3:00 | 25 Jul 2015 | Derby Arena, Derby, England | For British middleweight title |
| 14 | Win | 13–0 (1) | Grant Cunningham | TD | 5 (10), 1:33 | 28 Feb 2015 | Chase Leisure Centre, Cannock, England | Points TD after Jones was cut from an accidental head clash |
| 13 | Win | 12–0 (1) | Kieron Gray | KO | 3 (6), 2:45 | 17 May 2014 | Town Hall, Leeds, England | |
| 12 | Win | 11–0 (1) | Tyan Booth | TKO | 6 (10), 2:04 | 28 Mar 2014 | Elland Road Banqueting Suite, Leeds, England | |
| 11 | NC | 10–0 (1) | Simone Lucas | NC | 3 (8), 3:00 | 20 Sep 2013 | Metrodome, Barnsley, England | Fight stopped and ruled an NC due to problems with crowd control at the venue |
| 10 | Win | 10–0 | Costas Osben | PTS | 4 | 6 Jul 2013 | The Dome Leisure Centre, Doncaster, England | |
| 9 | Win | 9–0 | Kevin McCauley | PTS | 6 | 10 May 2013 | Elland Road Banqueting Suite, Leeds, England | |
| 8 | Win | 8–0 | Dee Mitchell | PTS | 6 | 16 Mar 2013 | John Charles Centre for Sport, Leeds, England | |
| 7 | Win | 7–0 | Jan Balog | PTS | 6 | 9 Dec 2012 | John Charles Centre for Sport, Leeds, England | |
| 6 | Win | 6–0 | Duncan Cottier | PTS | 4 | 23 Nov 2012 | Elland Road Banqueting Suite, Leeds, England | |
| 5 | Win | 5–0 | Matthew Ashmole | TKO | 1 (4), 1:31 | 8 Sep 2012 | Sports Arena, Hull, England | |
| 4 | Win | 4–0 | Steve Spence | PTS | 4 | 30 Jun 2012 | North Bridge Leisure Centre, Halifax, England | |
| 3 | Win | 3–0 | William Warburton | PTS | 4 | 18 May 2012 | Elland Road Banqueting Suite, Leeds, England | |
| 2 | Win | 2–0 | Andrew Patterson | PTS | 4 | 20 Apr 2012 | Irish Centre, Leeds, England | |
| 1 | Win | 1–0 | Liam Griffiths | PTS | 4 | 10 Mar 2012 | Braehead Arena, Glasgow, Scotland | |
