= Adam Etches =

English professional boxer (born 1991)

Personal information
- Nickname: The Bomber
- Born: 26 January 1991 (age 35) Sheffield, South Yorkshire, England
- Height: 5 ft 11.5 in (182 cm)
- Weight: Middleweight

Boxing career
- Reach: 71 in (180 cm)
- Stance: Orthodox

Boxing record
- Total fights: 22
- Wins: 20
- Win by KO: 17
- Losses: 2

Adam Etches (born 26 January 1991) is an English former professional boxer who fought at middleweight.

== Kickboxing and amateur career ==
Etches started out as a kickboxer and won various titles and trophies but decided to take up boxing as it was a more viable career option for him.

Etches quickly progressed in the unpaid side of the sport and reached the semi-finals of the 2009 Novice Amateur Boxing Association Championships. However, when he was defeated he was asked by Hatton Promotions Head of Boxing Richard Poxon to turn professional.

== Professional career ==
=== Early career ===
Etches made his professional debut at the De Vere Whites Hotel in Bolton and stopped Lester Walsh in two rounds.

He added another four names to his perfect record and hoped that promoter Ricky Hatton would reward him with his first title opportunity in 2012.

=== Etches vs. Barbosa ===
Etches won the vacant IBF International middleweight title by stopping Samir dos Santos Barbosa in the third round at Ponds Forge in Sheffield on 20 September 2014.

=== Etches vs. Khomitsky ===
He lost his title, and undefeated professional record, on 28 March 2015 to Sergey Khomitsky via fourth round knockout at Sheffield Arena.

=== Etches vs. Ryder ===
Etches fought John Ryder on 4 February 2017. Ryder won the fight via unanimous decision in their 12 round contest. The scorecards were 111–117, 112–116, 109–118 in favor of Ryder.

=== Retirement ===
Etches announced his retirement from professional boxing in October 2017.
