= Martin Murray (boxer) =

British boxer (born 1982)

Personal information
- Nationality: British
- Born: 27 September 1982 (age 44) St Helens, Merseyside, England
- Height: 5 ft 10.5 in (179 cm)
- Weight: Middleweight; Super-middleweight

Boxing career
- Reach: 73 in (185 cm)
- Stance: Orthodox

Boxing record
- Total fights: 46
- Wins: 39
- Win by KO: 17
- Losses: 6
- Draws: 1

Martin Murray (born 27 September 1982) is a British former professional boxer who competed from 2007 to 2020. He held the WBA interim middleweight title from 2011 to 2014, the British and Commonwealth middleweight titles between 2010 and 2012, and challenged five times for a world title.

== Professional career ==
=== Early career ===
Murray's professional debut came in September 2007 with a victory over Jamie Ambler at the Robin Park Arena in Wigan. He fought once more that year to finish 2007 with a record of 2–0. A busy 2008 saw Murray fight seven more times scoring seven victories over a series of journeyman opponents. On 22 November 2008, he stepped into the limelight by taking part in the fourth series of the Prizefighter tournament shown live on sky. He scored wins over Joe Rea and Danny Butler before beating former English title challenger Cello Renda in the final to claim the £25,000 first prize. Following the tournament victory Murray marked time with wins over fellow prospect Kevin Concepcion in April 2009 and former Commonwealth title challenger Thomas Awinbono in July of the same year.

=== Ricky Hatton Promotions ===
Murray left VIP Promotions after the Awinbono fight to sign with Hatton Promotions. His first fight was on the undercard of Matthew Macklin's European Title win at the Manchester Velodrome. Murray faced George Aduashvili of Georgia on 25 September 2009 and scored a first-round knockout victory. Following the win Murray said that former British champion Wayne Elcock was on his radar as a man he'd like to beat in order to push himself into future title contention. Murray's next fight on 27 November 2009 instead saw the man from St Helens outpoint Belarus boxer Sergey Khomitsky with a points victory over 8 rounds (Khomitsky was the first opponent, who managed to knock Murray down to the canvas for the first time in his pro career). In his first fight of 2010 Murray continued his winning run against international opposition with a victory over the Georgian middleweight champion Shalva Jomardashvili. A shot at the Commonwealth title against Tanzanian boxer Francis Cheka should then have subsequently followed. However, Cheka was refused a work permit and on 24 May 2010 in Sheffield, Murray instead defeated late replacement Lee Noble in another non-title fight en route to recording his 19th straight victory.

Two years later, Murray gave Nick Blackwell the first loss of his career and won the vacant British Middleweight title on 18 July 2011.

=== Commonwealth champion ===
On 16 July 2010 Murray finally fought for a first professional title, the middleweight version of the Commonwealth crown. His opponent at the fight in the Bolton Arena was Australian Peter Mitrevski Jr. Murray went the full 12 round distance for the first time in his career and won on a unanimous points decision. Despite the win Murray claimed that he had felt "sluggish" throughout the fight adding that "I know I can perform much better". He followed up the win on 26 November 2010 with a fight for a second title in a row at the Bolton Arena. His opponent, Brazilian Carlos Nascimento, was the co-challenger for the WBA version of the inter-continental title with Murray winning by stoppage in the third round.

Murray fought against Felix Sturm on 2 December 2011 at the SAP-Arena in Mannheim, Germany for the WBA Middleweight Title. The fight went 12 rounds and ended up being scored a controversial draw.

=== Second world title attempt ===
It was confirmed going into his with fight Jorge Navarro at Manchester Arena on 24 November 2012 for the interim WBA World Middleweight Championship, that if Murray were to defeat Navarro, he would be the next in line for a shot at the WBA World Middleweight Championship currently held by Gennady Golovkin. Murray, now 25–0–1, defeated the undefeated Venezuelan by TKO and would fight for the world title against World Middleweight Champion Sergio Martínez in Argentina on 27 April 2013. Murray lost a close, controversial decision in a fight where he put Martinez on the canvas twice but with the referee only counting one knockdown.

=== Third world title attempt ===
— Against some other fighter the fight that Martin Murray is fighting right now would be superb. It really would.
— But Golovkin is a fighter from another planet . . .

— Al Bernstein and Mark Pougatch calling the fight from Monte Carlo.

Following four solid decision victories in the aftermath of his loss to Sergio Martínez, Murray was given the opportunity to face off against the WBA and IBO middleweight champion Gennady Golovkin. Despite a spirited effort (that of which saw him fight into the 11th round, the second time in Golovkin's career he went ten rounds or more), Murray was ultimately stopped for the first time in his career after referee Luis Pabon witnessed him take several hard unanswered shots from Golovkin.

=== Fourth world title attempt ===
After three comeback wins, all of them ending early, Murray was set to challenge for a world title for the fourth time in his career, against Artur Abraham for the WBO super-middleweight title. Murray fought very well on Abraham's home turf in Germany, however, that was not enough for the judges, who scored the fight, 116–111, 115–112 and 112–115 in favor of the home fighter, awarding him the split-decision win. After the fight, a gutted Murray said he was contemplating retirement after another failed attempt to win a world title.

On 25 June 2016, Murray fought George Groves in a WBA final eliminator. Groves pressed Murray throughout most of the fight, earning him a unanimous decision win, with scores of 118–110 on all three judges' scorecards.

On 23 June 2018, Murray fought and defeated Roberto Garcia in a foul-filled fight. Murray had some success with his jab and landed more punches compared to Garcia, which was enough for all three judges to call the fight in favor of Murray.

In his next fight, Murray fought against former champion Hassan N'Dam. Despite scoring a knockdown, Murray did not do enough to earn the win. N'Dam won the fight via majority decision, with only one judge scoring the fight a draw, 114–114, while the other two saw it 117–112 and 116–112 in favor of N'Dam.

=== Retirement ===
Murray announced his retirement 3 weeks after his loss to Saunders. He ended his career with 39 wins (17 KOs), 6 loses, and 1 draw.

== Professional boxing record ==
46 fights	39 wins	6 losses
By knockout	17	1
By decision	22	5
Draws	1	

No.	Result	Record	Opponent	Type	Round, time	Date	Location	Notes
46	Loss	39–6–1	Billy Joe Saunders	UD	12	4 Dec 2020	The SSE Arena, London, England	For WBO super-middleweight title
45	Win	39–5–1	Sladan Janjanin	PTS	8	15 Nov 2019	Liverpool Olympia, Liverpool, England	
44	Win	38–5–1	Rui Manuel Pavanito	PTS	10	12 Jul 2019	Liverpool Olympia, Liverpool, England	
43	Loss	37–5–1	Hassan N'Dam N'Jikam	MD	12	22 Dec 2018	Manchester Arena, Manchester, England	Lost WBC Silver middleweight title
42	Win	37–4–1	Roberto García	UD	12	23 Jun 2018	The O2 Arena, London, England	Won WBC Silver middleweight title
41	Win	36–4–1	Arman Torosyan	KO	4 (8), 2:39	16 Sep 2017	Echo Arena, Liverpool, England	
40	Win	35–4–1	Gabriel Rosado	MD	12	22 Apr 2017	Echo Arena, Liverpool, England	Won vacant WBA Inter-Continental middleweight title
39	Win	34–4–1	Nuhu Lawal	UD	12	12 Nov 2016	Salle des Etoiles, Monte Carlo, Monaco	Won vacant WBA Continental (Europe) super-middleweight title
38	Loss	33–4–1	George Groves	UD	12	25 Jun 2016	The O2 Arena, London, England	For WBA International super-middleweight title
37	Win	33–3–1	Cedric Spera	TKO	2 (8), 1:47	7 May 2016	Manchester Arena, Manchester, England	
36	Loss	32–3–1	Arthur Abraham	SD	12	21 Nov 2015	TUI Arena, Hanover, Germany	For WBO super-middleweight title
35	Win	32–2–1	Jose Miguel Torres	TKO	5 (12), 2:19	5 Sep 2015	First Direct Arena, Leeds, England	Won vacant WBA Inter-Continental super-middleweight title
34	Win	31–2–1	Mirzet Bajrektarevic	TKO	5 (8), 2:51	18 Jul 2015	Manchester Arena, Manchester, England	
33	Win	30–2–1	George Beroshvili	KO	2 (8), 2:29	26 Jun 2015	Echo Arena, Liverpool, England	
32	Loss	29–2–1	Gennadiy Golovkin	TKO	11 (12), 0:50	21 Feb 2015	Salle des Etoiles, Monte Carlo, Monaco	For WBA (Super), IBO, and WBC interim middleweight titles
31	Win	29–1–1	Domenico Spada	TD	7 (12), 1:19	25 Oct 2014	Salle des Etoiles, Monte Carlo, Monaco	Retained WBC Silver middleweight title; Unanimous TD after Spada was cut from an accidental head clash
30	Win	28–1–1	Max Bursak	UD	12	21 Jun 2014	Casino, Monte Carlo, Monaco	Won vacant WBC Silver middleweight title
29	Win	27–1–1	Ishmael Tetteh	RTD	6 (10), 3:00	23 Apr 2014	Emperors Palace, Kempton Park, South Africa	
28	Win	26–1–1	Sergey Khomitsky	PTS	8	14 Dec 2013	ExCeL, London, England	
27	Loss	25–1–1	Sergio Martínez	UD	12	27 Apr 2013	José Amalfitani Stadium, Buenos Aires, Argentina	For WBC and The Ring middleweight titles
26	Win	25–0–1	Jorge Navarro	TKO	6 (12), 1:40	24 Nov 2012	Manchester Arena, Manchester, England	Won Interim WBA middleweight title
25	Win	24–0–1	Karim Achour	PTS	10	16 Jun 2012	Manchester Velodrome, Manchester, England	
24	Draw	23–0–1	Felix Sturm	SD	12	2 Dec 2011	SAP Arena, Mannheim, Germany	For WBA (Super) middleweight title
23	Win	23–0	Nick Blackwell	RTD	5 (12), 3:00	18 Jun 2011	Robin Park Arena, Wigan, England	Retained Commonwealth and WBA Inter-Continental middleweight titles; Won vacant British middleweight title
22	Win	22–0	John Anderson Carvalho	TKO	4 (12), 2:20	16 Apr 2011	MEN Arena, Manchester, England	Retained WBA Inter-Continental middleweight title
21	Win	21–0	Carlos Nascimento	TKO	3 (12), 1:40	26 Nov 2010	Reebok Stadium, Bolton, England	Won vacant WBA Inter-Continental middleweight title
20	Win	20–0	Peter Mitrevski Jr.	UD	12	16 Jul 2010	Bolton Arena, Bolton, England	Won vacant Commonwealth middleweight title
19	Win	19–0	Lee Noble	RTD	3 (8), 3:00	21 May 2010	Ponds Forge, Sheffield, England	
18	Win	18–0	Shalva Jomardashvili	PTS	6	19 Feb 2010	Fenton Manor Sports Complex, Stoke-on-Trent, England	
17	Win	17–0	Sergey Khomitsky	PTS	8	27 Nov 2009	Robin Park Arena, Wigan, England	
16	Win	16–0	George Aduashvili	KO	1 (6), 3:02	25 Sep 2009	Manchester Velodrome, Manchester, England	
15	Win	15–0	Thomas Awinbono	PTS	8	25 Jul 2009	Sutton Sports Centre, St Helens, England	
14	Win	14–0	Kevin Concepcion	TKO	3 (6), 0:01	17 Apr 2009	Indoor Sports Centre, Leigh, England	
13	Win	13–0	Mikheil Khutsishvili	TKO	4 (6), 1:13	6 Mar 2009	Robin Park Arena, Wigan, England	
12	Win	12–0	Cello Renda	SD	3	22 Nov 2008	York Hall, London, England	Prizefighter 4: middleweight final
11	Win	11–0	Danny Butler	SD	3	22 Nov 2008	York Hall, London, England	Prizefighter 4: middleweight semi-final
10	Win	10–0	Joe Rea	UD	3	22 Nov 2008	York Hall, London, England	Prizefighter 4: middleweight quarter-final
9	Win	9–0	Joseph Sovijus	KO	1 (6), 1:03	12 Oct 2008	Indoor Sports Centre, Leigh, England	
8	Win	8–0	Carl Wild	TKO	2 (6), 1:25	14 Sep 2008	Robin Park Arena, Wigan, England	
7	Win	7–0	Michael Recloux	PTS	6	15 Jun 2008	Sutton Leisure Centre, St Helens, England	
6	Win	6–0	Dean Walker	PTS	6	23 May 2008	Robin Park Arena, Wigan, England	
5	Win	5–0	James Tucker	PTS	4	18 Apr 2008	York Hall, London, England	
4	Win	4–0	Michael Banbula	PTS	6	16 Mar 2008	Everton Park Sports Centre, Liverpool, England	
3	Win	3–0	Dean Walker	PTS	6	16 Feb 2008	Tower Circus, Blackpool, England	
2	Win	2–0	Phil Callaghan	TKO	1 (4), 1:21	26 Oct 2007	Robin Park Arena, Wigan, England	
1	Win	1–0	Jamie Ambler	PTS	6	22 Sep 2007	Robin Park Arena, Wigan, England	

Sporting positions
Regional boxing titles
Vacant Title last held by Darren Barker	Commonwealth middleweight champion 16 July 2010 – December 2011; Vacated	Vacant Title next held by Billy Joe Saunders
Vacant Title last held by Avtandil Khurtsidze	WBA Inter-Continental middleweight champion 26 November 2010 – 2 December 2011; Lost bid for world title	Vacant Title next held by Patrick Nielsen
Vacant Title last held by Darren Barker	British middleweight champion 18 June 2011 – October 2012; Vacated	Vacant Title next held by Billy Joe Saunders
Vacant Title last held by Patrick Nielsen	WBC Silver middleweight champion 21 June 2014 – January 2015; Vacated	Vacant Title next held by Tureano Johnson
Vacant Title last held by Rocky Fielding	WBA Inter-Continental super-middleweight champion 5 September 2015 – November 2015; Vacated	Vacant Title next held by Jürgen Doberstein
Vacant Title last held by Dilmurod Satybaldiev	WBA Continental (Europe) super-middleweight champion 12 November 2016 – April 2017; Vacated	Vacant Title next held by Jamie Cox
Vacant Title last held by Nuhu Lawal	WBA Inter-Continental middleweight champion 22 April 2017 – May 2018; Vacated	Vacant Title next held by Khuseyn Baysangurov
Preceded by Roberto García	WBC Silver middleweight champion 23 June 2018 – 22 December 2018	Succeeded by Hassan N'Dam N'Jikam
World boxing titles
Vacant Title last held by Hassan N'Dam N'Jikam	WBA middleweight champion Interim title 24 November 2012 – 7 March 2014; Stripped	Vacant Title next held by Dmitry Chudinov
