= Jack Arnfield =

English boxer (born 1989)

Personal information
- Nationality: British
- Born: 22 May 1989 (age 37) Derby, Derbyshire, England
- Height: 6 ft 2 in (188 cm)
- Weight: Middleweight

Boxing career
- Stance: Orthodox

Boxing record
- Total fights: 30
- Wins: 26
- Win by KO: 6
- Losses: 4

Jack Arnfield (born 22 May 1989) is a British professional boxer. He has challenged twice for the British middleweight title.

== Professional career ==
=== Arnfield vs. Byrne ===
Arnfield made his professional debut on 26 October 2007, scoring a first-round stoppage over Lewis Byrne.

For his next seventeen fights over a span of eight years, Arnfield went undefeated and won mainly four- and six-round points decisions.

=== Arnfield vs. Renda ===
On 14 February 2015, Cello Renda handed Arnfield his first loss, via three-round split decision, as part of the tournament semi-finals of Prizefighter 34: The Middleweights III.

=== Arnfield vs. Blackwell ===
Later in the year, on 14 November, Arnfield fought for his first major regional championship—the British middleweight title—but lost a twelve-round unanimous decision to defending champion Nick Blackwell.

=== Arnfield vs. Rose ===
On 25 March 2017, Arnfield beat Brian Rose by unanimous decision in their 12 round contest. Rose was ranked #12 by the WBO at the time. The scorecards read 115-113, 115-113, 116–112 in favor of Arnfield.

=== Arnfield vs. Langford ===
On 17 February 2018, Arnfield fought Tommy Langford for the British middleweight title. Langford won by unanimous decision in their 12 round contest.

== Professional boxing record ==
30 fights	26 wins	4 losses
By knockout	6	1
By decision	20	3

No.	Result	Record	Opponent	Type	Round, time	Date	Location	Notes
30	Loss	26–4	Zach Parker	TKO	4 (10), 1:06	20 Jul 2024	Resorts World Arena, Birmingham, England	
29	Win	26–3	Robbie Chapman	PTS	6	11 May 2024	Winter Gardens, Blackpool, England	
28	Loss	25–3	Tommy Langford	UD	12	17 Feb 2018	Manchester Arena, Manchester, England	For British middleweight title
27	Win	25–2	Adam Jones	PTS	6	4 Nov 2017	BT Convention Centre, Liverpool, England	
26	Win	24–2	Brian Rose	UD	12	25 Mar 2017	Manchester Arena, Manchester, England	Retained WBA International middleweight title
25	Win	23–2	Mick Hall	RTD	11 (12), 3:00	21 Jan 2017	Guild Hall, Preston, England	Retained WBA International middleweight title
24	Win	22–2	Dan Blackwell	PTS	6	19 Nov 2016	Victoria Warehouse, Manchester, England	
23	Win	21–2	John Ryder	UD	12	24 Sep 2016	Manchester Arena, Manchester, England	Won WBA International middleweight title
22	Win	20–2	Alistair Warren	TKO	5 (8), 2:16	19 Mar 2016	Victoria Warehouse, Manchester, England	
21	Loss	19–2	Nick Blackwell	UD	12	14 Nov 2015	City Academy, Bristol, England	For British middleweight title
20	Win	19–1	Deividas Sajauka	PTS	8	24 Oct 2015	Victoria Warehouse, Manchester, England	
19	Loss	18–1	Cello Renda	SD	3	14 Feb 2015	Winter Gardens, Blackpool, England	Prizefighter 34: middleweight semi-final
18	Win	18–0	Mick Hall	SD	3	14 Feb 2015	Winter Gardens, Blackpool, England	Prizefighter 34: middleweight quarter-final
17	Win	17–0	Max Maxwell	PTS	10	15 Nov 2013	Winter Gardens, Blackpool, England	
16	Win	16–0	Gary Boulden	PTS	10	9 Mar 2013	De Vere Whites Hotel, Bolton, England	
15	Win	15–0	Jay Morris	RTD	1 (6), 3:00	14 Dec 2012	Winter Gardens, Blackpool, England	
14	Win	14–0	Nicky Jenman	PTS	6	2 Jun 2012	Bowlers Exhibition Centre, Manchester, England	
13	Win	13–0	Kevin McCauley	PTS	4	31 Mar 2012	Winter Gardens, Blackpool, England	
12	Win	12–0	Alex Spitko	PTS	4	23 Oct 2009	Bolton Arena, Bolton, England	
11	Win	11–0	Lee Noble	PTS	4	19 Sep 2009	Robin Park Arena, Wigan, England	
10	Win	10–0	Paul Morby	PTS	4	17 Apr 2009	Indoor Sports Centre, Leigh, England	
9	Win	9–0	Dee Mitchell	PTS	4	6 May 2009	Robin Park Arena, Wigan, England	
8	Win	8–0	Paul Royston	PTS	4	22 Nov 2008	Tower Circus, Blackpool, England	
7	Win	7–0	Jon Harrison	PTS	4	14 Sep 2008	Robin Park Arena, Wigan, England	
6	Win	6–0	Terry Adams	TKO	3 (6), 1:19	23 May 2008	Robin Park Arena, Wigan, England	
5	Win	5–0	Billy Smith	PTS	6	30 Mar 2008	Municipal Hall, Colne, England	
4	Win	4–0	David Kirk	PTS	6	16 Feb 2008	Tower Circus, Blackpool, England	
3	Win	3–0	Ben Hudson	PTS	4	8 Dec 2007	Robin Park Arena, Wigan, England	
2	Win	2–0	Lance Verallo	TKO	4 (6), 1:11	25 Nov 2007	Municipal Hall, Colne, England	
1	Win	1–0	Lewis Byrne	TKO	1 (4), 1:01	26 Oct 2007	Robin Park Arena, Wigan, England	

Sporting positions
Regional boxing titles
Preceded by John Ryder	WBA International middleweight champion 24 September 2016 – June 2018; Vacated	Vacant Title next held by Andrew Francillette
