= Andrey Sirotkin =

Russian boxer

Personal information
- Nationality: Russian
- Born: Андрей Витальевич Сироткин; 6 March 1985 (age 41) Zubovo, Russia
- Height: 173 cm (5 ft 8 in)
- Weight: Middleweight; Super middleweight

Boxing career
- Stance: Southpaw

Boxing record
- Total fights: 24
- Wins: 21
- Win by KO: 7
- Losses: 2
- Draws: 1

Andrey Sirotkin (born 6 March 1985) is a Russian professional boxer.

== Professional career ==
=== Sirotkin vs. Ryder ===
John Ryder (26–4-0) faced undefeated Sirotkin. Sirotkin gave Ryder problems early in the fight with his jab. By the time the fight came to the sixth round, Ryder looked like he was gaining control of the fight, hurting Sirotkin with a body shot. The punishment continued in the seventh round, culminating in a right hook to Sirotkin's body, from which he would not recover. Ryder was awarded the KO win in the seventh round.

== Professional boxing record ==
| 24 fights | 21 wins | 2 losses |
|---|---|---|
| By knockout | 7 | 2 |
| By decision | 14 | 0 |
| Draws | 1 | |

| No. | Result | Record | Opponent | Type | Round, time | Date | Location | Notes |
|---|---|---|---|---|---|---|---|---|
| 24 | Win | 21–1–1 | Abilkhaiyr Shegaliyev | UD | 10 | 20 Sep 2022 | USC Soviet Wings, Moscow, Russia | |
| 23 | Win | 20–1–1 | Viktar Murashkin | UD | 10 | 29 Apr 2022 | Concert Hall Mir, Moscow, Russia | |
| 22 | Loss | 19–1–1 | Meiirim Nursultanov | RTD | 5 (10), 3:00 | 5 Feb 2022 | Rixos Water World Aktau, Aktau, Kazakhstan | For vacant WBO International middleweight title |
| 21 | Draw | 19–1–1 | Danny Dignum | SD | 10 | 17 Apr 2021 | Bolton Whites Hotel, Bolton, England | For WBO European middleweight title |
| 20 | Win | 19–1 | Grant Dennis | TKO | 8 (10), 2:31 | 6 Oct 2020 | Falcon Club, Minsk, Belarus | |
| 19 | Win | 18–1 | Artem Karpets | KO | 4 (10), 1:16 | 30 Jul 2020 | DiaMond, Minsk, Belarus | |
| 18 | Win | 17–1 | Apti Ustarkhanov | UD | 10 | 21 Feb 2020 | Krylatskoye Sports Palace, Moscow, Russia | Won vacant WBC Continental Asian middleweight title |
| 17 | Win | 16–1 | Varazdat Chernikov | RTD | 1 (6), 3:00 | 24 Jul 2019 | Korston Club, Moscow, Russia | |
| 16 | Loss | 15–1 | John Ryder | KO | 7 (12), 2:54 | 27 Oct 2018 | Copper Box Arena, London, England | |
| 15 | Win | 15–0 | Ryan Ford | UD | 12 | 24 Mar 2018 | Basket Hall, Krasnodar, Russia | Retained WBA Inter-Continental super middleweight title |
| 14 | Win | 14–0 | Ricardo Mayorga | RTD | 9 (12), 3:00 | 3 Nov 2017 | Trade Union Sport Palace, Nizhny Novgorod, Russia | Won vacant WBA Inter-Continental super middleweight title |
| 13 | Win | 13–0 | Geard Ajetovic | UD | 10 | 18 Aug 2017 | Usadba Familiya, Plastunovskaya, Russia | Won vacant WBO European super middleweight title |
| 12 | Win | 12–0 | Dilmurod Satybaldiev | SD | 12 | 11 May 2017 | Arena, Kemerovo, Russia | |
| 11 | Win | 11–0 | Vladyslav Yeromenko | UD | 10 | 15 Nov 2016 | Dom Pechati, Ekaterinburg, Russia | Retained WBC Asian Boxing Council Super Middleweight Title; Won vacant WBC Eurasia Pacific Boxing Council super middleweight title |
| 10 | Win | 10–0 | Ricardo Marcelo Ramallo | KO | 3 (8), 1:56 | 10 Sep 2016 | Event-Hall, Solnechnyy, Russia | |
| 9 | Win | 9–0 | Alexander Rudnev | UD | 6 | 26 Aug 2016 | Dzerzhinsk, Russia | |
| 8 | Win | 8–0 | Murad Dalkhaev | UD | 10 | 6 May 2016 | DIVS, Ekaterinburg, Russia | Won vacant WBC Asian Boxing Council super middleweight title |
| 7 | Win | 7–0 | Karen Avetisyan | UD | 8 | 22 Feb 2016 | Iceberg Sports Palace, Adler, Russia | |
| 6 | Win | 6–0 | Alexander Tyushkin | RTD | 5 (6), 3:00 | 23 Nov 2015 | Boxing & Gym Academy, Moscow, Russia | |
| 5 | Win | 5–0 | Michael Mitchell | UD | 6 | 8 Nov 2014 | Boardwalk Hall, Atlantic City, New Jersey, U.S. | |
| 4 | Win | 4–0 | Mark Chimidov | UD | 6 | 1 Jun 2014 | Arena Mytishchi, Mytishchi, Russia | |
| 3 | Win | 3–0 | Mikhail Lidovskiy | UD | 4 | 23 May 2014 | Basket Hall, Krasnodar, Russia | |
| 2 | Win | 2–0 | Goekhan Kaya | KO | 1 (4), 2:45 | 11 Apr 2014 | Universal Hall, Berlin, Germany | |
| 1 | Win | 1–0 | Vasif Mamedov | UD | 4 | 5 Feb 2014 | Rings, Ekaterinburg, Russia | |
