= Dilmurod Satybaldiev =

Russian boxer

Personal information
- Nickname: Little Mike
- Nationality: Russian; Kyrgyzstani
- Born: Dilmurod Akramzhanovich Satybaldiev; June 2, 1994 (age 32) Suzak, Kyrgyzstan
- Weight: Super-middleweight

Boxing career
- Stance: Orthodox

Boxing record
- Total fights: 16
- Wins: 13
- Win by KO: 4
- Losses: 3

Dilmurod Akramzhanovich Satybaldiev (Cyrillic: Дилмурод Акрамжанович Сатыбалдиев; born 2 June 1994) is a Kyrgyz-Russian professional boxer who turned pro in 2013.

== Professional boxing record ==
16 fights	13 wins	3 losses
By knockout	4	0
By decision	9	3

No.	Result	Record	Opponent	Type	Round, time	Date	Location	Notes
16	Loss	13–3	Igor Mikhalkin	UD	10	12 Nov 2022	USC Soviet Wings, Moscow, Russia	
15	Win	13–2	Maxim Vlasov	RTD	6 (10), 3:00	27 May 2022	Avangard Ice Hockey Academy, Omsk, Russia	
14	Win	12–2	Kazim Umudov	RTD	1 (10), 3:00	26 Nov 2021	USC Soviet Wings, Moscow, Russia	
13	Loss	11–2	Andrey Sirotkin	SD	12	11 May 2017	Arena, Kemerovo, Russia	For inaugural WBA Asia super-middleweight title
12	Win	11–1	Claudio Ariel Abalos	UD	12	21 May 2016	Khodynka Ice Palace, Moscow, Russia	Retained WBA Continental super-middleweight title
11	Win	10–1	Roman Shkarupa	UD	12	12 Dec 2015	VTB Arena, Moscow, Russia	Retained WBA Continental super-middleweight title
10	Win	9–1	Dmitry Sukhotsky	SD	12	23 Aug 2015	Rixos Mriya Resort Hotel, Yalta, Crimea	Won vacant WBA Continental super-middleweight title
9	Win	8–1	Karen Avetisyan	UD	8	26 Jun 2015	Restaurant Tramplin, Moscow, Russia	
8	Win	7–1	Geard Ajetović	UD	12	5 Apr 2015	Sports Palace "Znamya", Noginsk, Russia	Won vacant WBC–CISBB super-middleweight title
7	Win	6–1	Karen Avetisyan	UD	10	12 Dec 2014	Dynamo Palace of Sports in Krylatskoye, Moscow, Russia	Won vacant Russia super-middleweight title
6	Win	5–1	Konstantin Piternov	SD	6	9 Aug 2014	Open-Air Bike Show, Sevastopol, Crimea	
5	Loss	4–1	Apti Ustarkhanov	UD	6	23 May 2014	Basket Hall, Krasnodar, Russia	
4	Win	4–0	Andrey Monakhov	TKO	6 (6), 1:00	21 Dec 2013	Ukrainian Institute of Foreign Languages, Kyiv, Ukraine	
3	Win	3–0	Dmitry Bolotsky	TKO	4 (6), 0:23	5 Oct 2013	National Technical University of Ukraine, Kyiv, Ukraine	
2	Win	2–0	Volodymyr Borovskyy	UD	4	24 May 2013	National Technical University of Ukraine, Kyiv, Ukraine	
1	Win	1–0	Mikhail Lidovskiy	UD	4	23 Feb 2013	Ukrainian Institute of Foreign Languages, Kyiv, Ukraine	
