= Sergey Khomitsky =

Belarusian boxer (born 1974)

Personal information
- Nickname: The Ghost
- Nationality: Belarusian
- Born: 13 September 1974 (age 52) Kamianets-Podilskyi, Ukrainian SSR, Soviet Union
- Height: 1.78 m (5 ft 10 in)
- Weight: Middleweight; Super-middleweight

Boxing career
- Reach: 183 cm (72 in)
- Stance: Orthodox

Boxing record
- Total fights: 60
- Wins: 33
- Win by KO: 14
- Losses: 24
- Draws: 3

Sergey Khomitsky (Belarusian: Siarhei Khamitski; born 13 September 1974) is a Belarusian professional boxer who has challenged once for the WBA interim middleweight title in 2015.

== Professional career ==
Khomitsky made his professional debut on 30 January 1999, winning a six-round unanimous decision over Aleksandr Chuvirov, who also debuted. More than four years would pass until Khomitsky next fought, after which he went undefeated for another three years until losing to Khoren Gevor on 7 March 2006; this loss came via twelve-round unanimous decision, with the IBF and WBO Inter-Continental middleweight titles on the line. In the past decade, Khomitsky has continued to fight many middleweight and super-middleweight contenders including Max Bursak, Martin Murray (twice), Lukáš Konečný, Jamie Moore, Ryan Rhodes, Frank Buglioni, Nick Blackwell, Alfonso Blanco, John Ryder, as well as future world champions Gennady Golovkin and Robert Stieglitz.

== Professional boxing record ==
60 fights	33 wins	24 losses
By knockout	14	4
By decision	19	20
Draws	3	

No.	Result	Record	Opponent	Type	Round, time	Date	Location	Notes
60	Win	33–24–3	Edison Demaj	SD	8	25 Jun 2022	Universum Gym, Hamburg, Germany	
59	Loss	32–24–3	Nick Hannig	UD	8	18 Dec 2021	Maritim Hotel, Magdeburg, Sachsen-Anhalt, Germany	
58	Loss	32–23–3	Dimitar Tilev	UD	10	12 Nov 2021	Lokschuppen, Bielefeld, Nordrhein-Westfalen, Germany	
57	Loss	32–22–3	Arpad Klasz	UD	10	16 Oct 2021	Ferenc Kellner Sports Hall, Budapest, Hungary	
56	Loss	32–21–3	Emre Cukur	UD	8	20 Mar 2021	LEO's Boxgym, Munich, Bayern, Germany	
55	Loss	32–20–3	Pavel Silyagin	RTD	4 (10), 3:00	24 Dec 2020	USC Soviet Wings, Moscow, Russia	
54	Loss	32–19–3	William Scull	UD	8	21 Sep 2019	Sporthalle, Zinnowitz, Germany	
53	Loss	32–18–3	Jevgenijs Aleksejevs	SD	6	15 Jun 2019	Arēna Rīga, Riga, Latvia	
52	Loss	32–17–3	Elvis Hetemi	UD	8	11 May 2019	Stadthalle, Magdeburg, Germany	
51	Win	32–16–3	Pavel Hryshkavets	PTS	4	17 Sep 2018	Crazy Horse Club, Minsk, Belarus	
50	Loss	31–16–3	Vladimir Shishkin	TKO	7 (10), 0:59	30 May 2018	Zimniy Stadion, Saint Petersburg, Russia	For WBA Asia interim super-middleweight title
49	Loss	31–15–3	Dmitry Chudinov	UD	8	24 Feb 2018	Arena Nürnberger Versicherung, Nuremberg, Germany	
48	Loss	31–14–3	Stanyslav Kashtanov	MD	10	22 Jul 2017	Red Square, Moscow, Russia	
47	Win	31–13–3	Siarhei Krapshyla	TKO	4 (6), 2:41	18 Sep 2016	Ochag Club, Minsk, Belarus	
46	Loss	30–13–3	John Ryder	UD	12	30 Jan 2016	Copper Box Arena, London, England	For vacant WBA International middleweight title
45	Loss	30–12–3	Alfonso Blanco	UD	12	10 Oct 2015	El Poliedro, Caracas, Venezuela	For WBA interim middleweight title
44	Win	30–11–3	Adam Etches	KO	4 (12), 1:35	28 Mar 2015	Sheffield Arena, Sheffield, England	Won IBF International middleweight title
43	Draw	29–11–3	Nick Blackwell	MD	6	25 Oct 2014	Salle des Etoiles, Monte Carlo, Monaco	
42	Loss	29–11–2	Robert Stieglitz	TKO	10 (12), 0:12	26 Jul 2014	Anhalt Arena, Dessau, Germany	For vacant WBO Inter-Continental super-middleweight title
41	Win	29–10–2	Frank Buglioni	TKO	6 (10), 1:04	12 Apr 2014	Copper Box Arena, London, England	Won WBO European super-middleweight title
40	Loss	28–10–2	Martin Murray	PTS	8	14 Dec 2013	ExCeL, London, England	
39	Win	28–9–2	Yevgeni Makhteienko	PTS	6	19 Feb 2013	Moulin Rouge Club, Minsk, Belarus	
38	Win	27–9–2	Iliya Shakuro	RTD	3 (8), 3:00	26 Sep 2012	Gladiator Boxing Gym, Maladzyechna, Belarus	
37	Win	26–9–2	Dmitry Adamovich	PTS	6	17 Apr 2012	Moulin Rouge Club, Minsk, Belarus	
36	Win	25–9–2	Aliaksandr Votinau	UD	4	22 Dec 2011	Gagarin Club, Minsk, Belarus	
35	Loss	24–9–2	Ryan Rhodes	PTS	8	26 Nov 2011	Magna Science Adventure Centre, Rotherham, England	
34	Draw	24–8–2	Yves Studer	SD	12	20 Aug 2011	Kursaal, Bern, Switzerland	For IBC middleweight title
33	Win	24–8–1	Aliaksei Konovko	RTD	2 (8), 3:00	18 Dec 2010	Boxing Gym, Minsk, Belarus	
32	Loss	23–8–1	Avtandil Khurtsidze	RTD	6 (10), 3:00	31 Jul 2010	Reaktor Club, Minsk, Belarus	
31	Win	23–7–1	Jamie Moore	RTD	6 (10), 3:00	3 Apr 2010	MEN Arena, Manchester, England	
30	Loss	22–7–1	Lukáš Konečný	UD	8	19 Dec 2009	Palace of Sporting Games, Yekaterinburg, Russia	
29	Loss	22–6–1	Martin Murray	PTS	8	27 Nov 2009	Robin Park Arena, Wigan, England	
28	Loss	22–5–1	Max Bursak	UD	10	21 Oct 2009	Palace of Sports, Kyiv, Ukraine	
27	Win	22–4–1	Tagir Rzaev	UD	6	25 Jun 2009	Casino Conti Giant Hall, Saint Petersburg, Russia	
26	Win	21–4–1	Dmitry Adamovich	KO	4 (6)	7 Oct 2008	Reaktor Club, Minsk, Belarus	
25	Win	20–4–1	Siarhei Navarka	TKO	4 (6)	24 Feb 2008	Restaurant Grodno, Grodno, Belarus	
24	Loss	19–4–1	Gennadiy Golovkin	TKO	5 (8), 1:59	25 May 2007	Fight Night Arena, Cologne, Germany	
23	Loss	19–3–1	Mouhamed Ali Ndiaye	UD	12	9 Mar 2007	Palazzetto Lagrange, Rome, Italy	For vacant IBF International super-middleweight title
22	Win	19–2–1	Attila Kiss	TKO	4 (4)	14 Nov 2006	Minsk, Belarus	
21	Win	18–2–1	Andrei Cherniauski	TKO	2 (10)	29 Jul 2006	Minsk, Belarus	Won vacant Belarus middleweight title
20	Loss	17–2–1	Laszlo Szucs	MD	12	8 Apr 2006	Emperor Garden, Budapest, Hungary	For IBU Inter-Continental middleweight title
19	Win	17–1–1	Khoren Gevor	UD	12	7 Mar 2006	Kugelbake Halle, Cuxhaven, Germany	For IBF and WBO Inter-Continental middleweight titles
18	Win	17–0–1	Tagir Rzaev	UD	8	24 Dec 2005	SKK Energetik, Sosnovy Bor, Russia	
17	Win	16–0–1	Jurijs Boreiko	UD	8	19 May 2005	Casino Conti Giant Hall, Saint Petersburg, Russia	
16	Win	15–0–1	Mahmud Maksudov	RTD	3 (12), 3:00	3 Mar 2005	Casino Conti Giant Hall, Saint Petersburg, Russia	Won vacant WBO Asia Pacific middleweight title
15	Win	14–0–1	Maksym Velychko	UD	6	17 Dec 2004	Sports Games Palace, Baku, Azerbaijan	
14	Win	13–0–1	Artem Vychkin	UD	8	22 Oct 2004	Dynamo Bar, Saint Petersburg, Russia	
13	Win	12–0–1	Andrey Gibalo	UD	6	17 Sep 2004	Dynamo Bar, Saint Petersburg, Russia	
12	Win	11–0–1	Oleksandr Matviychuk	UD	6	6 May 2004	Casino Conti Giant Hall, Saint Petersburg, Russia	
11	Win	10–0–1	Nikolay Talalakin	UD	10	12 Feb 2004	Casino Conti Giant Hall, Saint Petersburg, Russia	Won vacant Russia and WBC–CISBB middleweight titles
10	Win	9–0–1	Ruslan Khreptovich	TKO	2 (6)	12 Nov 2003	Casino Conti Giant Hall, Saint Petersburg, Russia	
9	Draw	8–0–1	Ruslan Yakupov	PTS	8	18 Sep 2003	Casino Conti Giant Hall, Saint Petersburg, Russia	
8	Win	8–0	Andrey Tylilyuk	UD	6	9 Aug 2003	Kasimovo Airport, Russia	
7	Win	7–0	Ruslan Akhmedzanov	UD	8	17 Jul 2003	Casino Conti Giant Hall, Saint Petersburg, Russia	
6	Win	6–0	Andrey Tylilyuk	UD	6	26 Jun 2003	Casino Conti Giant Hall, Saint Petersburg, Russia	
5	Win	5–0	Vladimir Zavgorodniy	UD	6	21 May 2003	Casino Conti Giant Hall, Saint Petersburg, Russia	
4	Win	4–0	Valeriu Verlan	KO	4 (6)	6 May 2003	Zaslawye, Belarus	
3	Win	3–0	Antons Fedjunins	RTD	3 (6), 3:00	19 Apr 2003	Liepāja, Latvia	
2	Win	2–0	Vasily Andriyanov	UD	6	10 Apr 2003	Casino Conti Giant Hall, Saint Petersburg, Russia	
1	Win	1–0	Aleksandr Chuvirov	UD	6	30 Jan 1999	Barysaw, Belarus	

Sporting positions
Regional boxing titles
Vacant Title last held by Alexey Chirkov	Russia middleweight champion 12 February 2004 – 2005; Vacated	Vacant Title next held by Dmitry Pirog
Preceded by Nikolay Talalakin	WBC–CISBB middleweight champion 12 Feb 2004 – 2007; Vacated	Vacant Title next held by Dmitry Pirog
Vacant Title last held by Brad Mayo	WBO Asia Pacific middleweight champion 3 March 2005 – 2007; Vacated	Vacant Title next held by Jamie Pittman
Vacant Title last held by Gocha Abashidze	Belarus middleweight champion 29 July 2006 – 2010; Vacated	Vacant Title next held by Andrei Salakhutdzinau
Preceded by Frank Buglioni	WBO European super-middleweight champion 12 April 2014 – November 2014; Vacated	Vacant Title next held by Frank Buglioni
Preceded by Adam Etches	IBF International middleweight champion 28 March 2015 – January 2016; Vacated	Vacant Title next held by Francis Lafreniere
