= John Ryder (boxer) =

English boxer (born 1988)

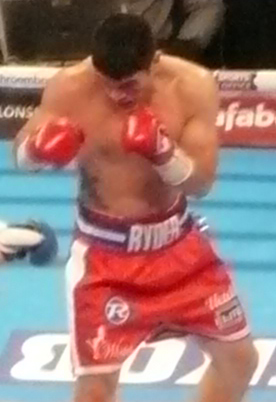
- Ryder in 2015

Personal information
- Nickname: The Gorilla
- Born: 19 July 1988 (age 38) Islington, London, England
- Height: 5 ft 9 in (175 cm)
- Weight: Middleweight; Super-middleweight

Boxing career
- Reach: 72 in (183 cm)
- Stance: Southpaw

Boxing record
- Total fights: 39
- Wins: 32
- Win by KO: 18
- Losses: 7

John Ryder (born 19 July 1988) is a British former professional boxer who competed from 2010 to 2024. He held an interim super-middleweight world title twice, and challenged twice for full world titles in that weight class, including the undisputed championship. At regional level, he challenged twice for the British middleweight title and once for the British super-middleweight title.

== Amateur career ==
As an amateur, Ryder fought for Angel Amateur Boxing Club in his birthplace of Islington, winning 30 fights out of 35.

== Professional career ==
Ryder turned professional on 10 September 2010, scoring a first-round technical knockout (TKO) against Ben Deghani. Having won his first fifteen fights, Ryder faced fellow undefeated prospect Billy Joe Saunders for his British and Commonwealth middleweight titles on 21 September 2013, losing a close unanimous decision (UD) with scores of 115–113, 115–113 and 115–114 for Saunders. Ryder won his first regional championship—the vacant WBO Inter-Continental middleweight title—on 11 October 2014, defeating Theophilus Tetteh via fifth-round TKO. He defended this title once, against Billi Facundo Godoy with a tenth-round TKO.

After Saunders vacated the British middleweight title, a bout was held between top contenders Ryder and Nick Blackwell on 30 May 2015. Ryder was widely ahead on the scorecards when he was stopped on his feet by Blackwell in the seventh round. Ryder bounced back on 30 January 2016, winning his second regional championship—the vacant WBA International middleweight title—with a UD over Sergey Khomitsky.

Ryder defended his WBA International middleweight title against Jack Arnfield on 24 September 2016, losing by UD over twelve rounds.

Ryder rebounded in his next fight, defeating Adam Etches by UD to win the IBF International super-middleweight title.

On 22 April 2017, Ryder moved up to super-middleweight to face Rocky Fielding for the British title but lost on a controversial split decision (SD).

On 5 May 2018, Ryder faced domestic rival Jamie Cox at The O2 Arena on the undercard of the rematch between David Haye and Tony Bellew. In a fight that had a grueling start, both fighters were trading punches from close range early. This led to Ryder dropping Cox in the second round. Cox would not be able to beat the referee's count, although by a tiny margin, earning Ryder the KO victory.

In his next fight, Ryder faced undefeated Russian challenger Andrey Sirotkin. Sirotkin gave Ryder problems early in the fight with his jab. By the time the fight came to the sixth round, Ryder looked like he was gaining control of the fight, hurting Sirotkin with a body shot. The punishment continued in the seventh round, culminating in a right hook to Sirotkin's body, from which the Russian would not recover. Ryder was awarded the KO win in the seventh round.

On the Canelo Álvarez vs. Daniel Jacobs card in Las Vegas in May 2019, Ryder beat Bilal Akkawy by TKO in the third round to win the vacant WBA interim super-middleweight title and put himself in line to challenge Callum Smith for the WBA (Super) and Ring magazine super-middleweight titles.

Following the successful defeat of Akkawy, Ryder fought Callum Smith for the super-middleweight titles in November 2019, losing via UD. Ryder managed to keep Smith on the inside for the beginning rounds. In the third round, Smith was able to impose his will, setting up for right hands with his long jab. Ryder managed to get Smith to fight on the inside again in the fifth round. As the fight went on, frequent clinching slowed the pace down. In the last rounds, Smith looked like he was tired, while Ryder was being the aggressor. Smith managed to land a couple of right hands before the final bell, as Ryder was still charging forward. The judges scored the fight 117–111 and 116–112 twice in favour of Smith, with some media outlets describing the scores as "controversial".

Ryder won the vacant WBO interim super-middleweight title on 26 November 2022 when his opponent, Zach Parker, retired at the start of the fifth-round of their contest at The O2 Arena in London citing an injury to his right hand.

He unsuccessfully challenged unified super-middleweight world champion Canelo Álvarez on 6 May 2023, losing by unanimous decision and then suffered a ninth-round stoppage defeat to Jaime Munguia on 27 January 2024. Ryder announced his retirement from boxing in February 2024.

== Professional boxing record ==
39 fights	32 wins	7 losses
By knockout	18	2
By decision	13	5
By disqualification	1	0

No.	Result	Record	Opponent	Type	Round, time	Date	Location	Notes
39	Loss	32–7	Jaime Munguía	TKO	9 (12), 1:25	27 Jan 2024	Footprint Center, Phoenix, Arizona, U.S.	For WBC Silver super-middleweight title
38	Loss	32–6	Canelo Álvarez	UD	12	6 May 2023	Estadio Akron, Zapopan, Mexico	For WBA (Super), WBC, IBF, WBO, and The Ring super-middleweight titles
37	Win	32–5	Zach Parker	RTD	5 (12), 0:01	26 Nov 2022	The O2 Arena, London, England	Won vacant WBO interim super-middleweight title
36	Win	31–5	Daniel Jacobs	SD	12	12 Feb 2022	Alexandra Palace, London, England	
35	Win	30–5	Jozef Jurko	TKO	5 (10), 2:33	10 Sep 2021	Wörthersee Stadion, Klagenfurt, Austria	
34	Win	29–5	Mike Guy	UD	10	18 Dec 2020	Seminole Hard Rock Hotel & Casino, Hollywood, Florida, US	
33	Loss	28–5	Callum Smith	UD	12	23 Nov 2019	M&S Bank Arena, Liverpool, England	For WBA (Super) and The Ring super-middleweight titles
32	Win	28–4	Bilal Akkawy	TKO	3 (12), 2:12	4 May 2019	T-Mobile Arena, Paradise, Nevada, US	Won vacant WBA interim super-middleweight title
31	Win	27–4	Andrey Sirotkin	KO	7 (12), 2:54	27 Oct 2018	Copper Box Arena, London, England	
30	Win	26–4	Jamie Cox	KO	2 (12), 0:50	5 May 2018	The O2 Arena, London, England	
29	Win	25–4	Patrick Nielsen	KO	5 (10), 3:00	14 Oct 2017	The SSE Arena Wembley, London, England	
28	Loss	24–4	Rocky Fielding	SD	12	22 Apr 2017	Echo Arena, Liverpool, England	For vacant British super-middleweight title
27	Win	24–3	Adam Etches	UD	12	4 Feb 2017	London Olympia, London, England	Won vacant IBF International super-middleweight title
26	Loss	23–3	Jack Arnfield	UD	12	24 Sep 2016	Manchester Arena, Manchester, England	Lost WBA International middleweight title
25	Win	23–2	Robert Talarek	PTS	6	28 May 2016	The SSE Hydro, Glasgow, Scotland	
24	Win	22–2	Sergey Khomitsky	UD	12	30 Jan 2016	Copper Box Arena, London, England	Won vacant WBA International middleweight title
23	Win	21–2	Adam Jones	PTS	6	10 Oct 2015	York Hall, London, England	
22	Loss	20–2	Nick Blackwell	TKO	7 (12), 2:36	30 May 2015	The O2 Arena, London, England	For vacant British middleweight title
21	Win	20–1	Billi Facundo Godoy	TKO	10 (12), 1:52	31 Jan 2015	The O2 Arena, London, England	Retained WBO Inter-Continental middleweight title
20	Win	19–1	Theophilus Tetteh	TKO	5 (10), 2:56	11 Oct 2014	The O2 Arena, London, England	Won vacant WBO Inter-Continental middleweight title
19	Win	18–1	Ruslans Pojonisevs	PTS	6	19 Jul 2014	Camden Centre, London, England	
18	Win	17–1	Jez Wilson	TKO	9 (10), 1:09	5 Apr 2014	York Hall, London, England	
17	Win	16–1	Giorgi Kandelaki	PTS	6	15 Mar 2014	Echo Arena, Liverpool, England	
16	Loss	15–1	Billy Joe Saunders	UD	12	21 Sep 2013	Copper Box Arena, London, England	For British and Commonwealth middleweight titles
15	Win	15–0	Yoann Bloyer	TKO	2 (6), 0:45	13 Jul 2013	Craven Park, Hull, England	
14	Win	14–0	Farai Musiyiwa	PTS	8	9 Mar 2013	Wembley Arena, London, England	
13	Win	13–0	Eamonn O'Kane	TKO	8 (10), 1:33	8 Dec 2012	London Olympia, London, England	
12	Win	12–0	Sandor Micsko	TKO	2 (8), 2:52	8 Sep 2012	Alexandra Palace, London, England	
11	Win	11–0	Luke Robinson	PTS	8	26 May 2012	Nottingham Arena, Nottingham, England	
10	Win	10–0	Alistair Warren	PTS	8	17 Mar 2012	Motorpoint Arena, Sheffield, England	
9	Win	9–0	Mariusz Biskupski	TKO	2 (8), 2:21	28 Jan 2012	York Hall, London, England	
8	Win	8–0	Zoran Cvek	TKO	3 (10), 2:49	3 Dec 2011	Prince Regent Hotel, Chigwell, England	
7	Win	7–0	Luke Osman	TKO	2 (6), 2:13	9 Nov 2011	York Hall, London, England	
6	Win	6–0	Danny Brown	TKO	1 (4), 0:37	8 Oct 2011	York Hall, London, England	
5	Win	5–0	Lee Noble	PTS	6	30 Apr 2011	London Olympia, London, England	
4	Win	4–0	Dalton Miller	RTD	2 (4), 3:00	26 Mar 2011	City Limits Pavilion, London, England	
3	Win	3–0	Lewis Byrne	PTS	4	19 Feb 2011	Wembley Arena, London, England	
2	Win	2–0	Sabie Montieth	DQ	1 (4), 1:00	4 Dec 2010	York Hall, London, England	Montieth disqualified for headbutting
1	Win	1–0	Ben Deghani	TKO	1 (4), 1:30	10 Sep 2010	York Hall, London, England	

Sporting positions
Regional boxing titles
Vacant Title last held by Matt Korobov	WBO Inter-Continental middleweight champion 11 October 2014 – 29 May 2015; Vacated	Vacant Title next held by Tommy Langford
Vacant Title last held by Tureano Johnson	WBA International middleweight champion 30 January 2016 – 24 September 2016	Succeeded by Jack Arnfield
Vacant Title last held by Stanislav Kashtanov	IBF International super-middleweight champion 4 February 2017 – October 2017; Vacated	Vacant Title next held by Ronny Landaeta
World boxing titles
Vacant Title last held by Vincent Feigenbutz	WBA super-middleweight champion Interim title 5 May 2019 – 23 November 2019; Failed to win Super title	Vacant Title next held by David Morrell
Vacant Title last held by Mario Veit	WBO super-middleweight champion Interim title 22 November 2022 – 6 May 2023; Failed to win world title	Vacant
