= Jarrod Fletcher =

Australian boxer (born 1983)

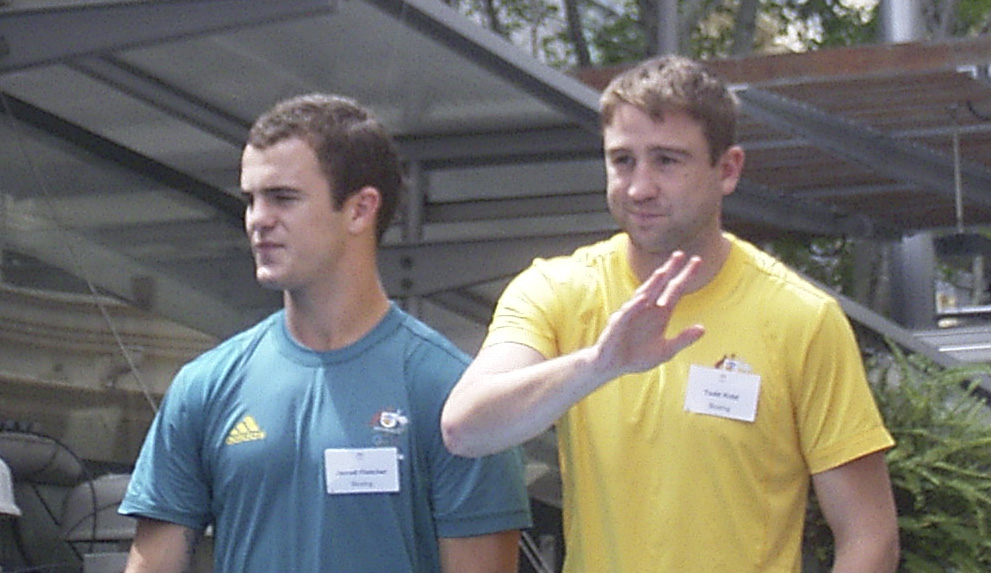
- Fletcher (left) in 2008

Personal information
- Nickname: Left Jab
- Nationality: Australian
- Born: 20 October 1983 (age 42) Moe, Victoria, Australia
- Height: 1.79 m (5 ft 10 in)
- Weight: Middleweight

Boxing career
- Reach: 178 cm (70 in)
- Stance: Orthodox

Boxing record
- Total fights: 21
- Wins: 18
- Win by KO: 10
- Losses: 3
Medal record
Representing Australia
Men's boxing
Commonwealth Games
| Gold medal – first place | 2006 Melbourne | Middleweight |

Jarrod Fletcher (born 20 October 1983) is an Australian professional boxer and a former world middleweight title challenger. As an amateur he won a gold medal at the 2006 Commonwealth Games in the middleweight division.

== School ==
- Secondary Education: Urangan State High School, Hervey Bay, QLD.

== Coaches ==
- Boxing Coaches:
- Dave Fletcher (1994–2002),
- Bodo Andreass (2002–2008) (AIS),
- Steve Deller (2009–present)

== Achievements ==
- Brothers Glenn and Rob were Australian Junior Champions and have fought on the world stage across many countries representing Australia.
- Jarrod was also a promising soccer player, representing his state of Queensland at the age of 13. He showed talent in the sport but rather than juggle Boxing and soccer, he decided at the age of 15 to concentrate solely on boxing.
- Jarrod has worked as a personal trainer since 2004, and has put the Queensland Maroons Team through their paces at the Fortitude Boxing Gymnasium in the lead up to the 2010 and 2011 NRL 'State of Origin' Series. Jarrod has been appointed part-time boxing coach for the Brisbane Lions AFL Team for 2012 and 2013.

== Professional boxing record ==
| 21 fights | 18 wins | 3 losses |
|---|---|---|
| By knockout | 10 | 2 |
| By decision | 8 | 1 |

| Result | Record | Opponent | Type | Round, time | Date | Location | Notes |
|---|---|---|---|---|---|---|---|
| Loss | 18–3 | (Australia) Daniel Geale | UD | 12 | 2014-12-03 | Hordern Pavilion, Moore Park, Australia | For vacant PABA Middleweight Title and interim WBO Asia Pacific Middleweight Title |
| Loss | 18–2 | (United States) Daniel Jacobs | TKO | 5 (12) | 2014-08-09 | (United States) Barclays Center, Brooklyn | For vacant WBA World Middleweight Title |
| Win | 18–1 | (Ukraine) Max Bursak | UD | 12 | 2014-02-01 | (Monaco) Salle des Étoiles, Monte Carlo | Won vacant WBA International Middleweight Title |
| Win | 17–1 | (Australia) Tim Kanofski | UD | 6 | 2013-10-11 | Reggio Calabria Club, Parkville, Australia | |
| Win | 16–1 | (Ghana) Philip Kotey | TKO | 6 (10) | 2013-05-09 | Royal International Convention Centre, Brisbane, Australia | |
