= Artur Akavov =

Russian boxer

Personal information
- Nickname: Wolverine
- Nationality: Russian
- Born: Artur Akavov; 14 December 1985 (age 40) Novocherkassk, Russian SFSR, Soviet Union
- Height: 1.76 m (5 ft 9 in)
- Weight: Middleweight

Boxing career
- Stance: Southpaw

Boxing record
- Total fights: 24
- Wins: 20
- Win by KO: 9
- Losses: 4

Artur Akavov (born 14 December 1985) is a Russian professional boxer who has challenged twice for the WBO middleweight title in 2016 and 2019.

== Professional career ==
Akavov boxed at various European national championships as an amateur before turning professional. In May 2014, Akavov won the minor WBO European title and went on to defend it three times.

=== Akavov vs. Saunders ===
Akavov had a record of 16-1 by 2016 and obtained a top ten ranking by the WBO, which eventually led to his opportunity to fight for a world title. The WBO middleweight champion Billy Joe Saunders was under pressure to make the first defence of the title he'd won by defeating Andy Lee almost a year previously. A hand injury to Saunders and two cancelled defences earlier in the year lead to Akavov being offered the fight, with the fight originally scheduled to take place on 22 October at the Motorpoint Arena in Cardiff. A muscle injury to Saunders then meant the fight was rescheduled for 26 November, before visa issues for Akavov caused the fight to be put back a further week to 3 December and the venue changed to the Paisley Lagoon Centre near Glasgow, Scotland.

The fight was fairly close for the first six rounds, with Saunders coming on strong for the next four rounds which seemed to tire him somewhat for the last two. Saunders claimed a unanimous decision after the full twelve rounds to retain his title, with the three judges scoring it 116-112, 116-113 and 115-113 in his favour. After the fight Saunders apologised to his fans, describing his performance as "flat" and "terrible". Many observers felt the decision could have gone either way, with the CompuBox final punch stats stating that Saunders landed 82/579 of punches to Akavov's 81/624, with both fighters outlanding the other in six rounds each.

=== Akavov vs. Andrade ===
On 18 January 2019, Akavov challenged for the WBO middleweight title for the second time in his career, this time against Demetrius Andrade. Andrade outboxed Akavov through most of the fight. Early in the final round, the referee decided to wave the fight off and award Andrade the TKO victory.

=== Akavov vs. Falcao ===
On 20 February 2021, Akavov fought Esquiva Falcao. Falcao was ranked #5 by the WBO and the IBF and #8 by the WBC at middleweight. Falcao beat Akavov by technical knockout in the 4th round.

== Professional boxing record ==
24 fights	20 wins	4 losses
By knockout	9	2
By decision	11	2

No.	Result	Record	Opponent	Type	Round, time	Date	Location	Notes
24	Loss	20–4	Esquiva Falcão	RTD	4 (10), 3:00	Feb 20, 2021	MGM Grand, Las Vegas, Nevada, U.S.	
23	Win	20–3	Sergei Melis	TKO	5 (8), 1:56	Oct 18, 2019	Olymp Maardu-Kalev, Maardu, Estonia	
22	Loss	19–3	Demetrius Andrade	TKO	12 (12), 2:36	Jan 18, 2019	Hulu Theater, New York City, New York, U.S.	For WBO middleweight title
21	Win	19–2	Gonzalo Gaston Coria	UD	10	May 12, 2018	Arena Riga, Riga, Latvia	Won vacant WBO International middleweight title
20	Win	18–2	Jean Carlos Prada	KO	1 (8), 0:55	Mar 24, 2018	Sport Hall Energia, Narva, Estonia	
19	Win	17–2	Josue Obando	SD	8	Apr 22, 2017	Celebrity Theater, Phoenix, Arizona, U.S.	
18	Loss	16–2	Billy Joe Saunders	UD	12	Dec 3, 2016	Lagoon Leisure Centre, Paisley, Scotland	For WBO middleweight title
17	Win	16–1	Todd Manuel	TKO	6 (8), 0:37	Mar 30, 2016	BB King Blues Club & Grill, New York, U.S.	
16	Win	15–1	Freddy Lopez	TKO	2 (8), 2:04	Nov 20, 2015	Aviator Sports Complex, Brooklyn, New York, U.S.	
15	Win	14–1	Michel Mothmora	UD	12	Jun 12, 2015	A Le Coq Sports Palace, Tartu, Estonia	Won vacant WBF World middleweight title
14	Win	13–1	David Makaradze	TKO	7 (12), 0:20	Mar 21, 2015	Tondiraba Ice Hall, Tallinn, Estonia	Retained WBO European middleweight title
13	Win	12–1	Sebastian Skrzypczynski	TKO	4 (12), 0:22	Feb 13, 2015	Ice Palace, Pskov, Russia	Retained WBO European middleweight title
12	Win	11–1	Sandor Micsko	KO	4 (12), 2:47	Oct 31, 2014	SuperClub, Pskov, Russia	Retained WBO European middleweight title
11	Win	10–1	Ivan Jukic	KO	2 (12), 1:23	May 15, 2014	SuperClub, Pskov, Russia	Won vacant WBO European middleweight title
10	Win	9–1	Marat Khuzeev	KO	1 (8), 1:15	Nov 30, 2013	SuperClub, Pskov, Russia	
9	Win	8–1	Bekzod Yunusov	UD	10	Apr 27, 2013	Gigant Hall Parakhod, Pskov, Russia	
8	Win	7–1	Evgeny Meshkov	UD	6	Nov 24, 2012	SuperClub, Pskov, Russia	
7	Win	6–1	Dmitry Pankratov	UD	6	Jul 14, 2012	Gigant Hall Parakhod, Pskov, Russia	
6	Loss	5–1	Oleg Liseev	UD	8	Apr 4, 2012	Crocus City Hall, Krasnogorsk, Russia	
5	Win	5–0	Sergey Sergeev	UD	6	Oct 8, 2011	Typhoon Club, Saint Petersburg, Russia	
4	Win	4–0	Andrey Tylilyuk	UD	6	Jul 26, 2011	Circus, Sochi, Russia	
3	Win	3–0	Gevorg Akopyan	UD	4	May 27, 2011	Typhoon Club, Saint Petersburg, Russia	
2	Win	2–0	Sherkhomil Rakhimov	UD	4	Apr 16, 2011	Typhoon Club, Saint Petersburg, Russia	
1	Win	1–0	Andrey Korzhenevsky	UD	4	Mar 4, 2011	Typhoon Club, Saint Petersburg, Russia	
