= Hatton Promotions =

Boxing company

Hatton Promotions is a promotional company which was headed by former two-weight world champion Ricky Hatton (1978-2025) with Richard Poxon as Director of Boxing.

== Starting up ==
On 4 February 2009, Hatton Promotions was officially launched at a press conference in which Ricky Hatton's fight with Manny Pacquiao was also announced.

The company is based in Hyde, Manchester and comprises a state of the art fitness suite, a large boxing gym with two full-size rings and offices.

In July 2009 having staged only four boxing events Hatton Promotions signed a deal with Sky to broadcast eight shows. Hatton said at the time: "Sky have been fantastic to us in handing us eight dates so early and we want to pay them back for their support by improving in everything we do".

== Notable boxers ==
Hatton promotions have had a large roster of boxers on their books, many of which are champions. These include;

- Martin Murray - British, Commonwealth and WBA Intercontinental champion.
- Joe Murray - a 2008 Olympian and rising prospect.
- Lucas Browne - Australian Heavyweight contender and former WBA regular champion
- Zhanat Zhakiyanov - Kazkahstani WBA Super World Bantamweight Champion
- Sergey Rabchenko - Belarusian junior-middleweight prospect
- Matty Askin - a 2008 ABA Cruiserweight Champion and current Central Area Cruiserweight belt holder.
- Adam Etches - a boxer in the light-middleweight division
- Denton Vassell - the current Commonwealth welterweight champion
- Craig Watson - the former British welterweight champion, also a Commonwealth titlist at both welterweight and light-middleweight.
- Gary Buckland - a former Celtic lightweight champion and Prizefighter winner at super-featherweight. Currently the British champion after beating Gary Sykes.
- Craig Lyon - the current English bantamweight champion
- Ashley Theophane - the former British light-welterweight champion
- Richard Towers - a heavyweight boxer who stands 6f8ins.
- Adam Little - A prospect from Blackpool

== See also ==
- Hayemaker Promotions
