= List of British super-welterweight boxing champions =

List of British super-welterweight boxing champions is a table showing the boxers who have won the British super-welterweight title, which has been the British Boxing Board of Control (BBBoC) since 1973.

A champion will often voluntarily relinquish the title in order to fight for a higher-ranked championship, such as the world or European. Where the date on which a champion relinquished the title is unclear, the date of the last BBBoC sanctioned fight is shown.

^{r} – Champion relinquished title.
^{s} – Champion stripped of title.

Name	Duration of reign	Defences
Larry Paul	25 September 1973 – 5 November 1974	2
Maurice Hope	5 November 1974 – 20 April 1976^{r}	2
Jimmy Batten	1 February 1977 – 11 September 1979	3
Pat Thomas	11 September 1979 – 24 March 1981	3
Herol Graham	24 March 1981 – 24 February 1981^{s}	1
Prince Rodney	11 October 1983^{r}	0
Jimmy Cable	22 February 1984 – 11 May 1985	2
Prince Rodney	11 May 1985 – 19 February 1986	2
Chris Pyatt	19 February 1986^{r}	0
Lloyd Hibbert	11 March 1987^{r}	0
Gary Cooper	3 February 1988 – 7 September 1988	1
Gary Stretch	7 September 1988 – 11 October 1989^{r}	1
Wally Swift Jr	19 March 1991 – 17 September 1992	2
Andy Till	17 September 1992 – 23 February 1994	1
Robert McCracken	23 February 1994 – 10 February 1995^{r}	2
Ensley Bingham	13 January 1996 – 13 April 1996^{r}	1
Ryan Rhodes	14 December 1996 – 14 March 1997^{r}	1
Ensley Bingham	19 December 1997 – 20 August 1999^{r}	2
Wayne Alexander	19 February 2000 – 17 November 2001^{r}	1
Jamie Moore	19 April 2003 – 26 November 2004	3
Michael Jones	26 November 2004 – 8 July 2005	1
Jamie Moore	8 July 2005 – 26 October 2007^{r}	2
Gary Woolcombe	8 December 2007 – 18 April 2008	1
Ryan Rhodes	18 April 2008 – 20 September 2008^{r}	1
Anthony Small	18 July 2009 – 26 March 2010	2
Sam Webb	26 March 2010 – 13 May 2011	2
Prince Arron	13 May 2011 – 3 December 2011	1
Brian Rose	3 December 2011 – 14 December 2012^{r}	3
Liam Smith	21 September 2013	2
Liam Williams	19 December 2015 – 6 July 2016^{r}	1
Ted Cheeseman	27 October 2018 – 19 October 2020	1
Scott Fitzgerald	19 October 2019 – 19 November 2020^{r}	0
Ted Cheeseman	27 March 2021 – 9 October 2021	0
Troy Williamson	9 October 2021 – 2 December 2022	1
Josh Kelly	2 December 2022^{r}	0
Samuel Antwi	1 September 2023^{r}	0
Ishmael Davis	15 November 2025 – 21 February 2026	1
Bilal Fawaz	21 February 2026 – present	0

== See also ==
- List of British heavyweight boxing champions
- List of British cruiserweight boxing champions
- List of British light-heavyweight boxing champions
- List of British super-middleweight boxing champions
- List of British middleweight boxing champions
- List of British welterweight boxing champions
- List of British light-welterweight boxing champions
- List of British lightweight boxing champions
- List of British super-featherweight boxing champions
- List of British featherweight boxing champions
- List of British super-bantamweight boxing champions
- List of British bantamweight boxing champions
- List of British super-flyweight boxing champions
- List of British flyweight boxing champions
- List of British world boxing champions
