= Tyan Booth =

British boxer

Personal information
- Nickname: Ty
- Born: Benjamin Tyan Booth Nottingham, England
- Height: 6 ft 2 1/2 in (189 cm)
- Weight: Welterweight; Light-middleweight; Middleweight; Super-middleweight; Light-heavyweight

Boxing career
- Reach: 78 in (198 cm)
- Stance: Orthodox

Boxing record
- Total fights: 28
- Wins: 12
- Win by KO: 2
- Losses: 11
- Draws: 5

Benjamin Tyan Booth is a British professional boxer and YouTuber. He challenged once for the European Union middleweight title against Grzegorz Proksa in 2010, and at national level competed for Midlands Area welterweight and super-welterweight titles in 2007 and 2009, and the English super-welterweight title in 2013, respectively. He is the reigning Black Country White Collar Boxing light-heavyweight world champion.

== Early life ==
Tyan Booth was born in Nottingham, England. Booth's father is Black British, while his mother is White British, making him mixed-race. Booth had high ambitions for himself after moving from Nottingham to be based in Sheffield, to which Booth stated: "I've made a few sacrifices for my boxing to get where I am [...] I gave up a nice home in Nottingham to sleep on a few floors in Sheffield so I could be close to the [Wincobank gym]." When Booth was growing up, he admired Naseem Hamed and Johnny Nelson.

== Amateur career ==
Booth began boxing at the Phoenix Amateur Boxing Club in Gedling, Nottingham, before transferring to the Wincobank gym in Sheffield, under the tutelage of Brendan Ingle and his sons John and Dominic.

== Professional career ==
=== Early career ===
Booth made his professional debut on 29 October 2005 at the Beach Ballroom in Aberdeen, Scotland, with him going the full six-rounds, defeating Donvill Hendricks via a points decision. Referee Paul Graham scored the fight 59–56 in favour of Booth. On 8 November 2005, Booth rematched Hendricks at the Leeds United FC Banqueting Suite, which resulted in referee Mickey Vann scoring the fight 59–56 in Booth's favour. On 27 February 2006, Booth fought Jason Welborn in this third professional fight, with the fighter being a push too far for Welborn and after a tough fight became the first person to stop Welborn, whom was knocked out by a clubbing right-hook in the third round. Welborn later stated that "Booth who was about a stone heavier than me on the night, way too big [...] Shortly after, I took a break from boxing [...]." Following his destruction of Welborn, Booth won a unanimous decision against Slovak Richard Turba at Norbreck Castle Hotel in Blackpool. For his fifth-fight, Booth travelled to Lanzarote, Spain, where he lost a close points decision to future Spanish super-middleweight champion, Alexis Callero.

=== Rise up the ranks ===
On 22 September 2006, after his loss against Callero, Booth returned with a points victory against highly touted George Hillyard at York Hall. In the following month, in what was described as the fight of the night, Booth skilfully outpointed Dawid Kowalski in what was described as "six thrilling rounds" at Afan Lido. He then had three more fights in the space of three months, defeating Chris Black (4-1-1), Peter Dunn (11-61-3), and Nathan Graham (6-0) all via unanimous points decisions. On his fight with Dunn, Booth admitted that he was unhappy with his performance, to which he stated "I didn’t get a good reaction from the crowd that night because I dropped down to the level of my opponent, but there will be no holding me back this time."

==== Booth vs. Gethin ====
After his defeat of Nathan Graham, on 21 February 2007, it was announced that he would face Darren Gethin, on the undercard of Carl Froch against Sergey Tatevosyan, at the Nottingham Arena in Nottingham for the Midlands Area welterweight title on 23 March 2007. On 23 March 2007, at Nottingham Arena, Graham defeated Booth via knockout in the tenth-round to secure the Midlands Area welterweight title. As Booth boxed well early on, Gethin, a crude pressure fighter, threw lots of punches, though Booth jabbed and moved, with him ultimately winning the first three rounds fairly comfortably. As the rounds wore on, Gethin began to make his pressure pay a little more, particularly with his overhand right, which kept catching Booth due to his low left hand. Booth boxed with the style of the Ingle gym, but it began to cost him, as he was caught with the right several times. Both began to tire, but Gethin's higher workrate began to tell, winning him rounds and, eventually, the tenth-round knockout win. Booth never saw the punch coming, a big right hand, and was out before he hit the floor. On 14 November, Booth was scheduled to face Kreshnik Qato on the undercard of Darren Barker and Ben Crampton for the vacant Commonwealth middleweight title at York Hall, however, the fight was cancelled. Another two losses followed: close points decisions over British fighters Chris Black (5-2-1) and Matthew Hall (16-1-0) in a 6-round and 8-round match, respectively. He returned, after his loss to Hall, to secure a knockout of Colin McNeil (11-2-1) in the first round. Several months later, Booth lost a points decision to Kevin Concepcion (11-0-0).

==== Booth vs. Marie-Sainte ====
On 7 March 2009, Booth fought future French middleweight champion Julien Marie-Sainte at Montreal Casino in Montreal, Canada, which resulted in Booth winning via split decision. The judges Richard DeCarufel, Jean Lapointe, and Benoît Rousseau scored the fight 77–75, 75–77, and 77–75. Booth displayed a particularly effective jab throughout, and as the fight progressed, Marie-Sainte managed to land favourable punches, both to the body and head, however, Marie-Sainte had difficulty in getting inside the pocket due to Booth's jab. After the fight, Marie-Sainte spoke of having difficulties in getting into the fight from the first-round, in which he added: "[...] but then the machine kicked in. It's true that I didn't do the fight I wanted, because [Booth] was not easy to box and was always on the move. Finally, it's things that happen. I thought I worked well enough to win, but the judges saw it differently. I am a little disappointed with the decision but here it is, I have to get up and continue."

==== Booth vs. Portman ====
On 1 April 2009, Boxing Scene reported that George Hillyard wished to avenge his loss to Booth, at a bout which was scheduled for 11 April at York Hall on the undercard of Craig Watson defence of his Commonwealth welterweight title against John O'Donnell. Following the announcement, Hillyard spoke of his desire to rematch Booth, to which he spoke highly of Booth: "Booth's a decent fighter and he's coming off a big win in Canada last month. He's the kind of guy that's hard to look good against and I found that out to my cost before. But you need to show your class against those type of opponents and you need to be beating these guys if you want to start stepping up through the levels." However, it was announced that Booth would instead challenge Marcus Portman on 17 October for the vacant Midlands Area super-welterweight title, on the undercard of Carl Froch's defence of his WBC super-middleweight title against Andre Dirrell at the Trent FM Arena in Nottingham. The event was part of the second Super Six super-middleweight tournament masterminded by American broadcaster Showtime. The winner of the scheduled bout was set to be next in line for the British super-welterweight title held by Anthony Small. At the weigh-in, Booth, 26 at the time of the fight, weighed in at 153 and three-quarter pounds, the lightest he had weighed since 2008; Portman, 29, came in lighter at 153 pounds. The opening round saw southpaw Portman and the orthodox Booth giving a tentative exchange, with the last few seconds ending in holding. Round two became littered with a few wild swings, and a severe lack of clean shots. Round three became clinch, move, swing, clinch, move, swing, though progressing to the fifth, Booth displayed efforts in his offense; the most exciting part of the round so far had arrived, in that wild punches were being landed by each fighter after the bell. In what looked like a lively move in round six, Portman was cut - suspected to be from a clash of heads; the bout was full of wild uncultured punches. Both men went the full 10 rounds, with referee Shaun Messer ultimately scoring the fight 96–96 as a draw.

==== Booth vs. Proksa ====
On 10 January 2010, BBC reported that Booth was one of the rumoured candidates to be competing alongside Bradley Pryce for the first light-middleweight Prizefighter tournament, at the York Hall on 26 February. On 5 February, Fakt reported that Booth would face Polish Grzegorz Proksa (19-0-0) for the vacant European Union middleweight title, as original fighter Marcus Portman was not approved by the European Boxing Union. On 12 February 2010, Booth failed to add the vacant European middleweight title to his belt collection, on the undercard of Lenny Daws' defence of his English super-lightweight title against Jason Cook at York Hall. At the weigh-in, Booth, 26 at the time of the fight, weighed in at 159 and three-quarter pounds, moving up a weight since Portman; Proksa, 25, came in lighter at 158 and three-quarter pounds. Proksa struggled early on with Booth's jab, height and reach. He was rocked by a right hand over the top which caught him on the temple in the second round, though he showed great resolve and soon enough his superior work rate and movement started to pay dividends. He was readily catching Booth to the body and coming in throwing strong combinations. Proksa's punch output was just too much for Booth and having dropped him in the fifth-round, referee Giuseppe Quartarone decided to call a halt to the bout, thus giving Proksa the vacant title. Speaking after the fight, Proksa mentioned the shot which Booth had caught im with in round-two: "For half a minute after that blow, I heard nothing, it was ringing in my head [...] I was surprised by this blow, I don't know how it hit me. Then I wanted to kill him."

==== Booth vs. Aston I ====
Following his loss to Proksa, Booth was announced to be returning on the undercard of Carl Froch's defence of his IBF super-middleweight title against American Yusaf Mack at the Nottingham Arena on 17 November, to face Ryan Aston (7-1-0). Of the encounter, Aston spoke of how he'll show everyone his fighting pride has not diminished against the slippery Booth, who has proved tricky for southpaws in the past, to which he added "It's a step up for me and I wanted that, I want to prove to people that last time was a hiccup and I have learned from it [...] I am just glad it happened early on in my pro career. [Booth] is a better boxer than [Curtis Valentine], in every sense of the word, he's on the back-foot all of the time with that long jab. I want him to come and have a fight, it gives people what they want to see." Booth looked to take the centre of the ring and keep Aston on the outside. For a round, it worked, though Aston answered the bell for the second with a two-fisted offense that unsettled Booth. After that, Booth who was forced to grab in the closing moments of the round after more punches found the target. Aston kept the pressure on in the third round until he was cut under his right eyebrow. On the advice of the ringside doctor, referee Terry O'Connor declared the fight a technical draw.

=== Consecutive defeats ===
==== Booth vs. Renda ====
On 2 February 2013, Booth's return to the ring came against Cello Renda in Peterborough, wherein Booth lost the fight via disqualification in the ninth round for persistent rule-breaking. Renda was leading 79–75 at the moment of impact. Booth appeared to not be interested in boxing: he came to unsettle and frustrate his opponent. Renda adapted for this style of boxer and glimpses of Renda the fighter delighted the home support. He kept up a strong work rate and went to war when an opening presented itself past Booth's dangling jab. Rounds one and two were Renda's, with Booth began spoiling with unnecessary clinches in the third but both men managed to fire off some stinging blows. By the fifth Renda started to pick his shots better and reminded us of his effective, big right hand on several occasions. Six and seven were all about digging deep as Renda fought tirelessly to break Booth's frustrating style but in round eight, two overhand rights reminded Booth of how difficult it was going to be to take Renda's title. Minutes later Booth resorted to delivering a nasty head butt, to which referee Grant Wallis made the decision to disqualify Booth. In the post-fight interview, Renda stated, "I'm lucky not to be badly hurt due to what he was doing. I could have lost teeth, broken my nose or had damage to my eye socket from being head butted all night. It became clear early in the fight that is game plan was to rough me up."

==== Booth vs. Mansouri ====
After the disqualification to Renda, on 8 March, Booth's return came in a narrow points-loss to former British super welterweight champion Prince Arron, to which referee Phil Edwards scored 57–58 at the Bowlers Exhibition Centre in Manchester. After his narrow points loss to Arron, Booth secured himself a 17 May shot for the vacant English light-middleweight title against Navid Mansouri (11-1-1) at Ponds Forge Arena in Sheffield. Originally, Mansouri was scheduled to face Nathan Graham (14-5-1), however, that encounter was postponed due to an injury suffered by Graham, to which Booth stepped in at late notice as a replacement. Mansouri charged, but Booth was unfazed, using his jab and moving nicely. Booth did open up but Mansouri was very impressive in evading the shots. Just before the end of the first, Booth had success with a right hand which made Mansouri wince, with him returning to his corner in discomfort and concerned about his left eye. Booth obviously felt in control in the second-round; Booth did less than Mansouri but his work was more effective; Mansouri charged at Booth with mixed results. Mansouri rushed at Booth early in the third but found himself tied up. Much of the work was done at close quarters in this session and it was difficult to judge who had the upper hand. In the fourth, Booth offered some crisp work but spent time admiring his successes whilst the less-refined Mansouri chugged along. In the fifth, Mansouri landed some scoring punches early in the session, especially to the body, and Booth was much less comfortable having to put pressure on rather than react to it. Round six was another close round with both fighters beginning to look tired. Booth opened up with determination to start the seventh, and Mansouri boxed off the back foot again. Mansouri was still scoring sporadically to the body, though Booth was hunting him down but not taking full advantage of the positions he was getting himself into, throwing ones and twos rather than sustained combinations. Booth cracked in a hard right early in the eighth but rather than pouncing on Mansouri he took his time which might not have been the best strategy given that Mansouri did look a little tired. Mansouri's courage had shown as Booth asked him a question in the ninth, with the Rotherham man coming back with a nice right hand; Booth was invariably on the front foot but he just couldn't nail Mansouri down. Booth landed a nice left hook to begin the final round. Booth charged but Mansouri stopped him with a counter right hook. A left hook to the body landed from Booth but Mansouri characteristically gritted his teeth and fired back. Referee Terry O’Connor had to split the tiring pair several times as their admirable efforts became more scrappy. Booth landed a hard overhand right but the final bell came before he could seek any advantage from it. After ten entertaining rounds of boxing, judges Steve Gray, Mark Lyson, and Dave Parris scored the bout 94–98, 94–98, and 94–96 all in favour for Mansouri, who improved his spotless record to 12-1-1.

==== Booth vs. Eubank Jr. ====
On 5 June, it was revealed that Booth would challenge Terry Carruthers for the vacant Midlands Area middleweight title, which would be an eliminator for Mansouri's English title, at the Paragon Hotel in Birmingham on 21 June. However, on 8 June, Booth took a late-notice eight-rounder with unbeaten Chris Eubank Jr. (9-0-0) at Bluewater in Kent, on the undercard of James DeGale's defence of his WBC Silver super-middleweight title against Stjepan Božić. On 5 June 2013, Booth spoke to First Class Boxing, wherein he revealed that he was first aware of the fight on 29 May, and regarding his proclivity in taking high-level opponents at very short notice, Booth went on to stated that "[...] I've never had a promoter, giving me two months notice for fights, the most I've had is two weeks the least is two days [...] I've got to do it the Johnny Nelson way: taking last minute jobs in fighters' back gardens, and learning the hard way." Eubank Jr. spoke of how tough and game Booth was as a fighter, though highlighting that his opponent was someone he would ultimately prevail over. In the opening exchanges it was Booth that started the brighter - utilising his height and reach advantage to frustrate Eubank Jr and keep him at range. Eubank Jr continued to press the action, focussing on firm body shots before throwing an overhand right to try and knock Booth out of his rhythm; Booth gave as good as he got in the early rounds - keeping Eubank Jr at range. Eubank Jr was the aggressor, throwing solid combinations before Booth tied him up on the ropes. As the fight entered the third, Eubank Jr upped his work rate and began to breakdown the tricky Booth, finding windows inside to land solid right hands to the body. As the contest continued, Eubank Jr came on stronger, again finding space on the inside to deliver powerful body shots, catching Booth with the overhand right that he had been throwing in the earlier rounds. Booth continued to box smart and use his range but Eubank Jr was growing in confidence, throwing the right hand over before moving inside to the body. In the eighth and final round, Eubank Jr was on top and another combination of body and head shots opened a cut above Booth's eye. As Booth tried to survive the round, Eubank Jr caught him with a powerful right hand followed with succession of lefts and rights, which resulted in referee Ian John-Lewis waving off the contest. Speaking after the fight, Chris Eubank Sr. spoke most highly of Booth: "[Booth] is very experienced, he knew how to play out the time, stay out of range - it's all a learning process for [Eubank Jr] [...] It's not about putting [Eubank Jr] in with people he can beat because of his abilities, it's about him climbing the ladder at a steady pace as every fighter, ever after, did." Booth's trainer, Dominic Ingle, in his prediction for Billy Joe Saunders' clash with Eubank Jr. had stated "[Eubank Jr] is good, has an awkward style but shows flaws. [Booth] boxed his ears off for four rounds, couldn't miss him."

=== Comeback trail ===
==== Booth vs. Aston II ====
On 21 September 2013, Booth returned to rematch Ryan Aston at the Liverpool Olympia in Liverpool. Booth confidently set out his jab and found little difficulty in landing against the southpaw Aston. As Booth became more aggressive, Aston found him with a solid straight left in round two. At the end of the fourth round, it appeared that Booth thought it was the end of the fight as rather than walk back to his corner, he leant casually on the ropes. In the fifth round, Booth landed a nice right uppercut and a follow up straight right which had Aston hanging on. There were numerous clinches and stumbles, and as Booth later highlighted: their styles didn't quite gel. After a closely fought contest, referee John Latham declared it a draw 57-57.

==== Booth vs. Williams ====
On 7 December 2013, Booth faced undefeated British future British and Commonwealth champion Liam Williams (8-0-0) at the Echo Arena in Liverpool, on the undercard of Liam Smith's defence of his British light-middleweight title against Mark Thompson. Of the scheduled encounter with Booth, Williams stated "He's a tall, rangy fighter and he's a bit dirty. So, I've just got to take the fight to him, that's all. If I give him room to do his thing, I could make it hard work for myself [...] He gave [Eubank Jnr] a good fight and he's got two draws with Ryan Aston. I'm expecting a good fight from him, I'm not expecting a walkover and I think it'll be a good fight." At the weigh-in, Booth, 30 at the time of the fight, weighed in at 157 and one-half pounds; Williams, 21, came in lighter at 156; the lightest of the latter's career thus far. In his first fight at light-middleweight, Williams began brightly and was winning while Booth had a point deducted in round two for an intentional headbutt. In the third round, Booth was cut from another head clash, it was inspected by the doctor who advised the bout to be stopped and the referee, John Latham, obliged. After the fight, Williams spoke of his frustration: "I felt I was clearly winning the fight but [Booth] was a spoiler. It was a rough contest while it lasted and it is a little bit frustrating to have that [draw] on my record." Williams' face, underneath his eyebrow, required twenty-two stitches.

==== Booth vs. Morrison ====
After the draw with Williams, On 28 February 2014, it was reported that Booth would face Jonson McClumpha (7-0-0) on the undercard of Kirk Goodings' English lightweight title defence against Gary Fox. However, Booth returned on 28 March, though was knocked out in the sixth-round by Damon Jones (10-0-0) in Leeds, who secured the British Masters Gold title. It didn't start well for Booth as Jones stormed straight in putting Booth firmly in his place, knocking him down in the second minute and cutting Booth's left eye before knocking him back to the canvas seconds later. Feeling Jones's powerful jab, Booth continued to struggle throughout the second and third rounds. Booth found his feet in the fourth and put more into the fight, though Jones was still all over him and continued to hit hard for the rest of the round. Throughout the fifth and into the sixth, Jones laid Booth down on the bottom rope, to which Booth returned to his feet. Jones began to prove to be too much for Booth, which resulted in referee John Latham stopping the fight. Following his loss to Jones, Booth came back on 27 May 2017, to draw against Turkish Onder Ozgul, in which judge Kieran McCann scored the fight 38-38, albeit many believed Booth had prevailed. Booth had relied on his vast height while too clinching within close-quarters, though had managed to cut the eye of Ozgul.

On 30 June 2017, Booth returned to shockingly defeat Joe Gallagher's protégé Marcus Morrison (14-1-0) in Derby via a points decision, with Referee Shaun Messer scoring the fight 39–38 in favour of Booth. At the weigh-in, Booth, 34 at the time of the fight, weighed in at 167 and one-quarter pounds; Morrison, 24, came in heavier at 168 and three-quarter pounds, which was the heaviest of his career. After his encounter with Booth, Morrison believed he didn't lost on the night nor think he was beaten by the better man: "[Booth] is tall, rangy, he's an Ingle fighter so over four rounds is a bit of a nightmare for anybody. If I'd got him over six or eight rounds it'd have been a different story. It was over four rounds and I just wanted to get out there and get a win after the Welborn fight, but it didn't go to plan." After his defeat of Morrison, Booth, at late notice, was set to face undefeated Craig Richards (9-0-0) at York Hall, however, as he was ten-pounds lighter than Richards, the British Boxing Board of Control suspended the contest.

== Outside of boxing ==
On 27 February 2018, BBC reported that Booth had his boxing licence suspended following his comments on social media after the death of Scott Westgarth. The British Boxing Board of Control revealed that they suspended Booth with immediate effect, in which Booth's trainer, Dominic Ingle, stated: "The inappropriate comments tweeted recently by [Booth] will be dealt with by the Ingle Gym and BBBofC. He has been asked to remove them."

== Professional boxing record ==
28 fights	12 wins	11 losses
By knockout	2	4
By decision	10	6
By disqualification	0	1
Draws	5	

No.	Result	Record	Opponent	Type	Round, time	Date	Location	Notes
28	Win	12–11–5	Marcus Morrison	PTS	4	30 Jun 2017	Rollerworld Derby, Derby, England	
27	Draw	11–11–5	Onder Ozgul	PTS	4	27 May 2017	York Hall, London, England	
26	Loss	11–11–4	Damon Jones	TKO	6 (10), 2:04	28 Mar 2014	Leeds United FC Banqueting Suite, Leeds, England	For vacant British Masters light-heavyweight title
25	Draw	11–10–4	Liam Williams	TD	3 (8), 1:08	7 Dec 2013	Echo Arena, Liverpool, England	Fight stopped after Booth was cut by an accidental head clash
24	Draw	11–10–3	Ryan Aston	PTS	6	21 Sep 2013	Liverpool Olympia, Liverpool, England	
23	Loss	11–10–2	Chris Eubank Jr.	TKO	8 (8), 2:31	8 Jun 2013	Bluewater, Kent, England	
22	Loss	11–9–2	Navid Mansouri	UD	10	17 May 2013	Ponds Forge Arena, Sheffield, England	For English light-middleweight title
21	Loss	11–8–2	Prince Arron	PTS	6	8 Mar 2013	Bowlers Exhibition Centre, Manchester, England	
20	Loss	11–7–2	Cello Renda	DQ	9 (10), 0:35	2 Feb 2013	East of England Arena, Peterborough, England	For International Masters light-heavyweight title
19	Draw	11–6–2	Ryan Aston	TD	3 (6), 1:20	17 Oct 2012	Nottingham Arena, Nottingham, England	Fight stopped after Aston suffered an accidental cut
18	Loss	11–6–1	Grzegorz Proksa	TKO	5 (12), 2:02	12 Feb 2010	York Hall, London, England	For vacant European Union middleweight title
17	Draw	11–5–1	Marcus Portman	PTS	10	17 Oct 2009	Nottingham Arena, Nottingham, England	For vacant Midlands Area super-welterweight title
16	Win	11–5	Julien Marie Sainte	SD	8	7 Mar 2009	Montreal Casino, Montreal, Canada	
15	Loss	10–5	Kevin Concepcion	PTS	10	28 Jun 2008	Aylestone Leisure Centre, Leicester, England	
14	Win	10–4	Colin McNeil	KO	1 (4)	29 Mar 2008	Beach Ballroom, Aberdeen, Scotland	
13	Loss	9–4	Matthew Hall	PTS	8	3 Dec 2007	Piccadilly Hotel, Manchester, England	
12	Loss	9–3	Chris Black	PTS	6	24 Nov 2007	Play Drome, West Dunbartonshire, Scotland	
11	Loss	9–2	Darren Gethin	KO	10 (10), 2:05	23 Mar 2007	Nottingham Arena, Nottingham, England	For Midlands Area welterweight title
10	Win	9–1	Nathan Graham	PTS	6	2 Dec 2006	Elephant & Castle Centre, London, England	
9	Win	8–1	Peter Dunn	PTS	4	24 Nov 2006	Nottingham Arena, Nottingham, England	
8	Win	7–1	Chris Black	PTS	6	28 Oct 2006	Beach Ballroom, Aberdeen, Scotland	
7	Win	6–1	Dawid Kowalski	PTS	6	13 Oct 2006	Afan Lido, Neath Port Talbot, Wales	
6	Win	5–1	George Hillyard	PTS	6	22 Sep 2006	York Hall, London, England	
5	Loss	4–1	Alexis Callero	PTS	6	27 May 2006	Lanzarote, Spain	
4	Win	4–0	Richard Turba	PTS	6	6 May 2006	Norbreck Castle Hotel, Blackpool, England	
3	Win	3–0	Jason Welborn	KO	3 (6), 1:32	27 Feb 2006	Holiday Inn, Birmingham, England	
2	Win	2–0	Donvill Hendricks	PTS	6	8 Nov 2005	Leeds United FC Banqueting Suite, Leeds, England	
1	Win	1–0	Donvill Hendricks	PTS	6	29 Oct 2005	Beach Ballroom, Aberdeen, Scotland	
