= Chris Pyatt =

English boxer (born 1963)

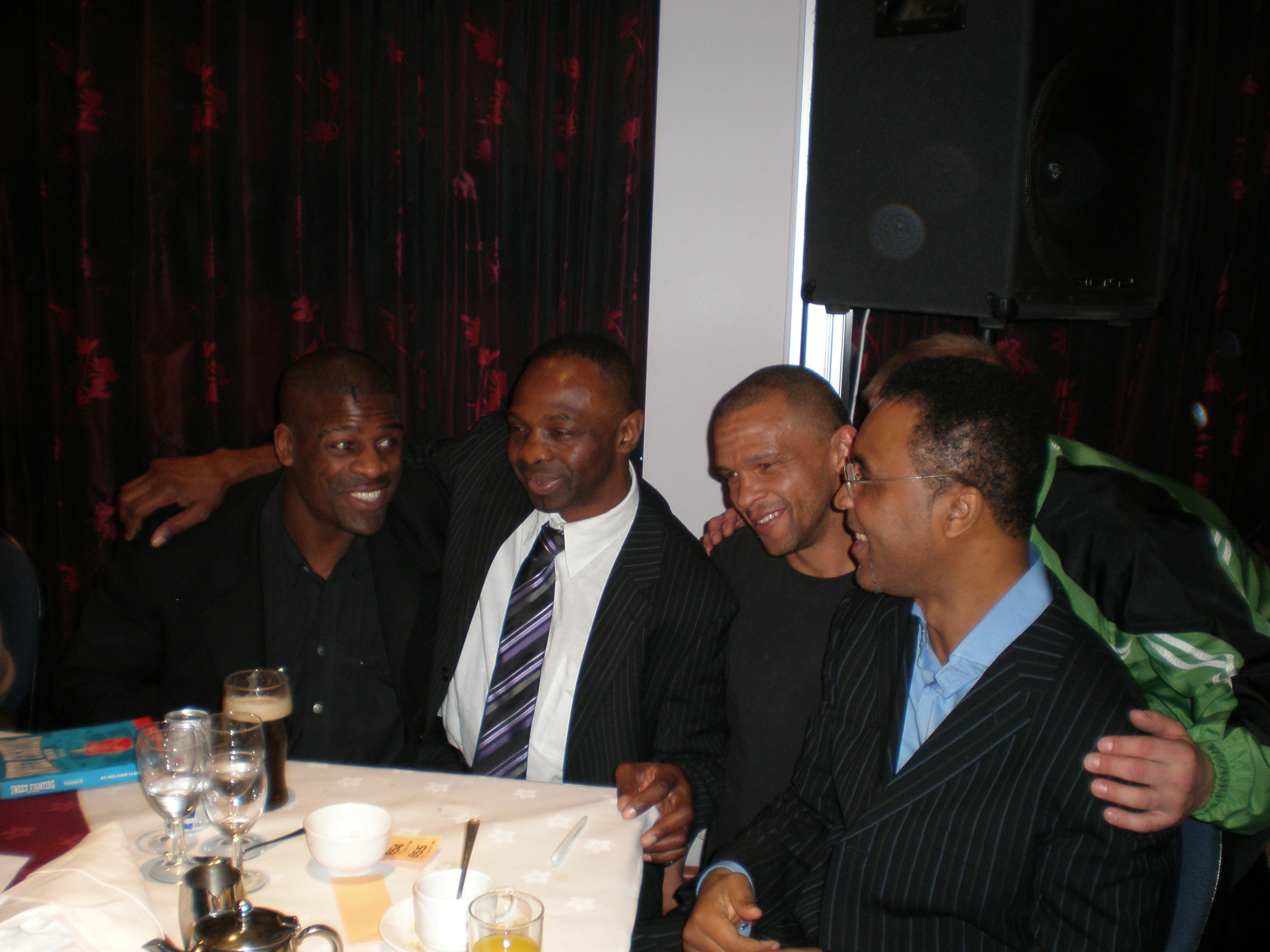
- Chris Pyatt (second right) with veteran boxers Errol Christie (left), James Cook and Michael Watson (right) in February 2008

Personal information
- Nationality: British
- Born: Chris Pyatt; 3 July 1963 (age 63) Islington, England
- Height: 5 ft 8 1/2 in (174 cm)
- Weight: Light middleweight; Middleweight

Boxing career
- Stance: Orthodox

Boxing record
- Total fights: 51
- Wins: 46
- Win by KO: 33
- Losses: 5
Medal record
Men's Boxing
Representing England
Commonwealth Games
Gold medal – first place	1982 Brisbane	welterweight

Chris Pyatt (born 1963 in Islington) is a former world middleweight champion boxer from Leicester, England.

== Boxing career ==
=== Amateur ===
He represented England and won a gold medal in the welterweight division, at the 1982 Commonwealth Games in Brisbane, Queensland, Australia.

He was the ABA welterweight champion in 1982, fighting out of Belgrave ABC.

=== Professional ===
He won the WBO belt against Sumbu Kalambay on 19 May 1993 but lost it against Steve Collins on 11 May 1994 after 2 successful defences. He currently works with professional fighters.

== Professional boxing record ==
51 fights	46 wins	5 losses
By knockout	33	2
By decision	13	3

No.	Result	Record	Opponent	Type	Round, time	Date	Location	Notes
51	Win	46–5	Maurice Forbes	PTS	8 (8)	1997-05-03	Nynex Arena, Manchester, England	
50	Loss	45–5	Steve Foster	UD	12 (12)	1996-07-06	Nynex Arena, Manchester, England	Lost Commonwealth light middleweight title
49	Win	45–4	Kevin Kelly	PTS	12 (12)	1995-12-16	Welsh Institute of Sport, Cardiff, Wales	Won Commonwealth light middleweight title
48	Win	44–4	James Mason	TKO	5 (6)	1995-09-02	Wembley Stadium, Wembley, England	
47	Win	43–4	Anthony Ivory	PTS	8 (8)	1995-05-13	Kelvin Hall, Glasgow, Scotland	
46	Loss	42–4	Steve Collins	TKO	5 (12)	1994-05-11	Ponds Forge, Sheffield, England	Lost WBO middleweight title
45	Win	42–3	Mark Cameron	KO	1 (12)	1994-02-09	Brentwood Centre, Brentwood, England	Retained WBO middleweight title
44	Win	41–3	Antonio Corti	KO	6 (12)	1993-09-18	Granby Halls, Leicester, England	Retained WBO middleweight title
43	Win	40–3	Sumbu Kalambay	UD	12 (12)	1993-05-19	Granby Halls, Leicester, England	Won vacant WBO middleweight title
42	Win	39–3	Paul Wesley	PTS	10 (10)	1993-03-16	Grosvenor House, Mayfair, England	
41	Win	38–3	Colin Manners	KO	3 (10)	1993-02-23	Dome Leisure Centre, Doncaster, England	
40	Win	37–3	Danny Garcia	UD	12 (12)	1993-01-26	Granby Halls, Leicester, England	Retained WBC International middleweight title
39	Win	36–3	Adolfo Caballero	KO	5 (12)	1992-10-27	Granby Halls, Leicester, England	Won vacant WBC International middleweight title
38	Win	35–3	Ian Strudwick	PTS	10 (10)	1992-05-23	National Exhibition Centre, Birmingham, England	
37	Win	34–3	James Tapisha	TKO	1 (12)	1992-04-28	Civic Hall, Wolverhampton, England	Retained Commonwealth light middleweight title
36	Win	33–3	Melvin Wynn	KO	3 (10)	1992-03-31	Sports Village, Norwich, England	
35	Win	32–3	Ambrose Mlilo	TKO	3 (12)	1992-02-01	National Indoor Arena, Birmingham, England	Retained Commonwealth light middleweight title
34	Win	31–3	Craig Trotter	PTS	12 (12)	1991-11-05	Granby Halls, Leicester, England	Won vacant Commonwealth light middleweight title
33	Loss	30–3	John David Jackson	UD	12 (12)	1990-10-23	Granby Halls, Leicester, England	For WBO light middleweight title
32	Win	30–2	Hugo Sclarandi	TKO	2 (10)	1990-04-25	London Arena, Millwall, England	
31	Win	29–2	Wayne Harris	TKO	3 (10)	1989-10-11	London Arena, Millwall, England	
30	Win	28–2	Daniel Domínguez	TKO	10 (10)	1989-05-17	London Arena, Millwall, England	
29	Win	27–2	Russell Mitchell	TKO	4 (10)	1989-02-15	York Hall, Bethnal Green, England	
28	Win	26–2	Tyrone Moore	KO	1 (10)	1988-12-14	York Hall, Bethnal Green, England	
27	Win	25–2	Knox Brown	TKO	2 (8)	1988-12-01	Picketts Lock Stadium, Edmonton, England	
26	Win	24–2	Eddie Hall	TKO	2 (8)	1988-11-23	York Hall, Bethnal Green, England	
25	Win	23–2	Jose Duarte	TKO	4 (10)	1988-05-28	Royal Albert Hall, Kensington, England	
24	Win	22–2	Gilbert Josamu	PTS	8 (8)	1987-10-28	Grand Hall, Wembley, England	
23	Win	21–2	Sammy Floyd	TKO	2 (8)	1987-05-26	Wembley Arena, Wembley, England	
22	Win	20–2	Dennis Johnson	KO	2 (8)	1987-04-18	Royal Albert Hall, Kensington, England	
21	Loss	19–2	Gianfranco Rosi	UD	12 (12)	1987-01-28	Palazzo Dello Sport, Perugia, Italy	Lost EBU light middleweight title
20	Win	19–1	Reynaldo Hernandez	TKO	3 (10)	1986-10-25	Zénith, Paris, France	
19	Win	18–1	John van Elteren	TKO	1 (12)	1986-09-17	Royal Albert Hall, Kensington, England	Won vacant EBU light middleweight title
18	Win	17–1	Thomas Smith	TKO	1 (10)	1986-05-20	Wembley Arena, Wembley, England	
17	Win	16–1	Prince Rodney	KO	9 (12)	1986-02-19	Royal Albert Hall, Kensington, England	Won BBBofC light middleweight title
16	Loss	15–1	Sabiyala Diavila	KO	4 (10)	1985-09-23	Grosvenor House, Mayfair, England	
15	Win	15–0	Mosimo Maeleke	TKO	6 (8)	1985-07-01	Grosvenor House, Mayfair, England	
14	Win	14–0	Graeme Ahmed	TKO	3 (8)	1985-06-05	Royal Albert Hall, Kensington, England	
13	Win	13–0	Helier Custos	TKO	5 (8)	1985-02-12	Royal Albert Hall, Kensington, England	
12	Win	12–0	Brian Anderson	PTS	12 (12)	1984-11-16	Granby Halls, Leicester, England	
11	Win	11–0	John Ridgman	TKO	1 (8)	1984-10-16	Royal Albert Hall, Kensington, England	
10	Win	10–0	Alfonso Redondo	TKO	3 (8)	1984-05-23	Grosvenor House, Mayfair, England	
9	Win	9–0	Franky Moro	KO	4 (8)	1984-05-09	Granby Halls, Leicester, England	
8	Win	8–0	Pat Thomas	PTS	10 (10)	1984-03-15	Granby Halls, Leicester, England	
7	Win	7–0	Judas Clottey	PTS	8 (8)	1984-02-22	Royal Albert Hall, Kensington, England	
6	Win	6–0	Tony Britton	TKO	4 (8)	1983-11-22	Wembley Arena, Wembley, England	
5	Win	5–0	Tyrone Demby	KO	2 (8)	1983-10-08	Playboy Hotel & Casino, Atlantic City, U.S.	
4	Win	4–0	Darwin Brewster	PTS	8 (8)	1983-09-27	Wembley Arena, Wembley, England	
3	Win	3–0	Lee Hartshorn	TKO	3 (8)	1983-04-28	Granby Halls, Leicester, England	
2	Win	2–0	Billy Waith	TKO	8 (8)	1983-04-05	Royal Albert Hall, Kensington, England	
1	Win	1–0	Paul Murray	RTD	2 (6)	1983-03-01	Royal Albert Hall, Kensington, England	

== See also ==
- List of world middleweight boxing champions
- List of British world boxing champions

Sporting positions
Amateur boxing titles
Previous: Terry Marsh	ABA Welterweight champion 1982	Next: Bob McKenley
Regional boxing titles
Preceded by Prince Rodney	British super welterweight champion 19 February 1986 – 1986; Vacated	Vacant Title next held by Lloyd Hibbert
Vacant Title last held by Said Skouma	EBU super welterweight champion 17 September 1986 – 28 January 1987	Succeeded by Gianfranco Rosi
Vacant Title last held by Troy Waters	Commonwealth super welterweight champion 5 November 1991 – 1992; Vacated	Vacant Title next held by Mickey Hughes
Preceded by Kevin Kelly	Commonwealth super welterweight champion 16 December 1995 – 6 July 1996	Succeeded by Steve Foster
World boxing titles
Vacant Title last held by Gerald McClellan	WBO middleweight champion 19 May 1993 – 11 May 1994	Succeeded by Steve Collins
