= Gary Cooper (boxer) =

British former boxer

Personal information
- Nationality: British
- Born: 31 May 1957 (age 69) Hythe, Hampshire, England
- Height: 5 ft 10 in (178 cm)
- Weight: Welterweight, light middleweight

Boxing career

Boxing record
- Total fights: 27
- Wins: 16
- Win by KO: 5
- Losses: 9
- Draws: 2

Gary Cooper (born 31 May 1957) is a British former boxer who was British light middleweight champion in 1988.

== Career ==
Born in Hythe, Cooper was trained by Jack Bishop in Southampton, and turned professional in 1978. After winning five and drawing two of his first seven fights, he suffered his first defeat in October 1979 at the hands of future British and Commonwealth welterweight champion Lloyd Hibbert. Between 1980 and 1982 he had six fights, losing to Jimmy Cable and twice to Cliff Gilpin.

Copper was out of the ring for over two years, returning in December 1984 at light middleweight with a win over Martin Patrick. He faced Patrick again a month later, stopping him in the tenth round to take the BBBofC Southern Area light middleweight title. This set him up for a shot at Jimmy Cable's British title in February 1985, Cable winning on points.

Over the next three years he successfully defended his Southern Area title three times against Mick Courtney, each time winning on points, suffered defeats to Nicky Wilshire and French champion Yvon Segor, and beat Gaston Cool. He got a second shot at the British title in February 1988, beating Michael Harris at Wembley on points. In his first defence of the title in September he was beaten on points by Gary Stretch.

Cooper's final fight came in March 1989, a win over future British champion and world title challenger Ensley Bingham.
