= Mehreen Baig =

British television presenter (born 1989)

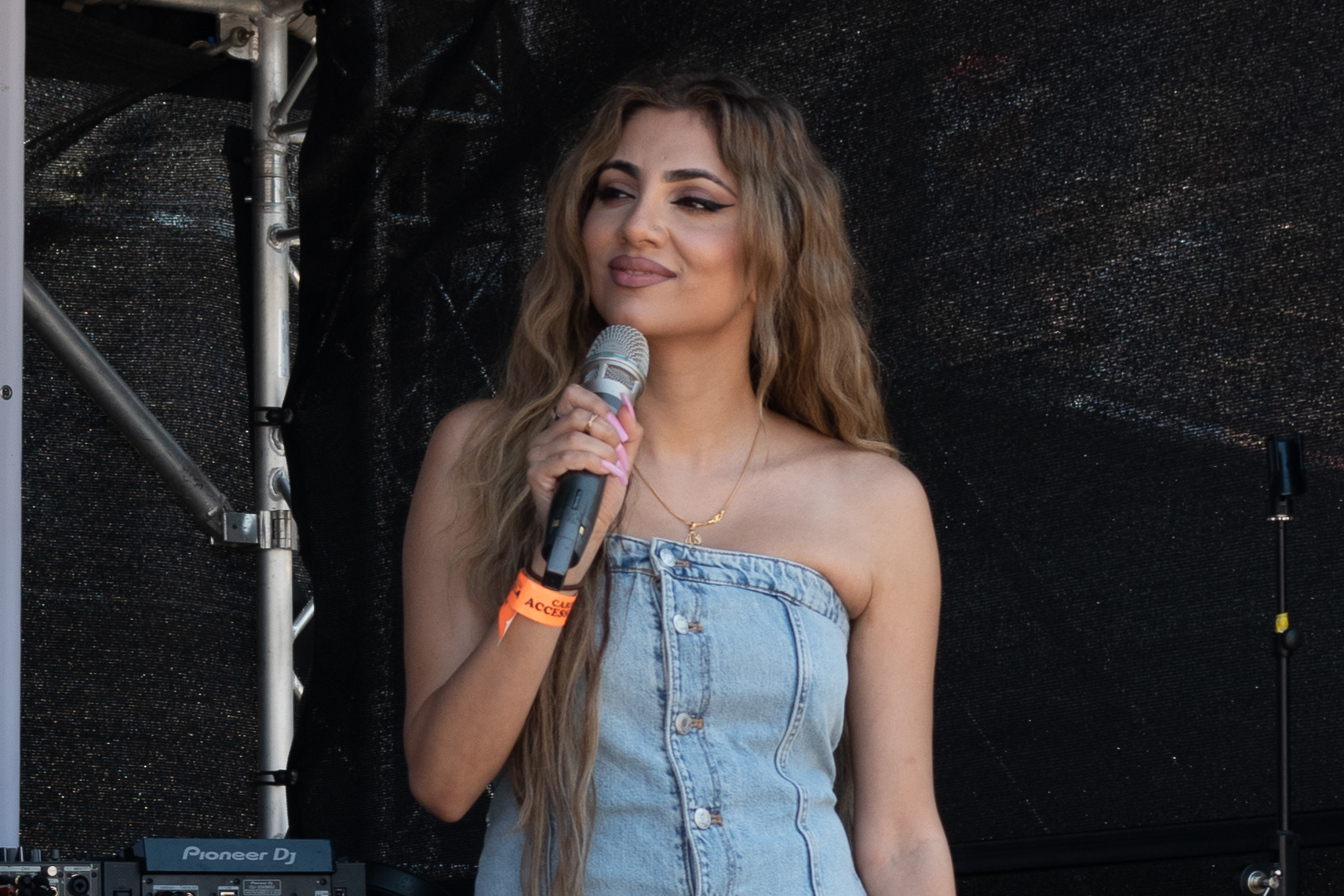
Baig in 2023

Mehreen Baig (born 28 November 1989) is a British television presenter. She has presented several documentaries on topics relating to Britain's Asian and Muslim communities.

== Biography ==
Baig was born on 28 November 1989, in Hackney, East London to Pakistani parents. Baig attended Queen Elizabeth's School for Girls in Barnet. She went on to graduate from the UCL Institute of Education. Baig has been a secondary school teacher in North London.

In 2016, Baig was in the BBC Two documentary Muslims Like Us, in which Muslims of differing backgrounds and beliefs were made to live together. She was the second to enter the house after the former boxer and Islamist Anthony Small (Abdul Haqq), who gave her a leaflet condemning gender mixing.

In February 2018, Baig fronted Islam, Women and Me, a BBC One documentary exploring the role of women in the religion. In August, she presented Lost Boys? What’s Going Wrong For Asian Men, which explored issues relating to British Pakistani men. Tim Dowling of The Guardian gave it four stars out of five for being "informed, thorough and provocative". Suhaiymah Manzoor-Khan of Al Jazeera gave a negative review, saying that the documentary blamed the men's situation on Pakistani culture more than on discrimination.

Baig has also presented documentaries on physical fitness, and segments on the BBC's Sunday Morning Live and The One Show. In 2019, she took part in Pilgrimage, in which people of differing religious views made a pilgrimage to Rome. In 2020 Baig presented the BBC Studios and Open University co-production Our Coast with Adrian Chiles.

== Personal life ==
Mehreen has lived in North Finchley since the turn of the millennium.
