= Kirpa =

Kirpa is a name which is used as a surname and a given name. It is also a term used in Sikhism. People with the name include:

== Given name ==
- Kirpa Ram (1916–1945), Indian military officer
- Kirpa Ram Punia, also known as K. R. Punia (born 1936), Indian politician
- Kirpa Ram Vij (1935–2022), Singaporean military officer and business executive

== Surname ==
- Heorhiy Kirpa (1946–2004), Ukrainian statesman and politician
- Ivan Kirpa (born 1978), Russian boxer
