= Grzegorz Proksa =

Polish boxer

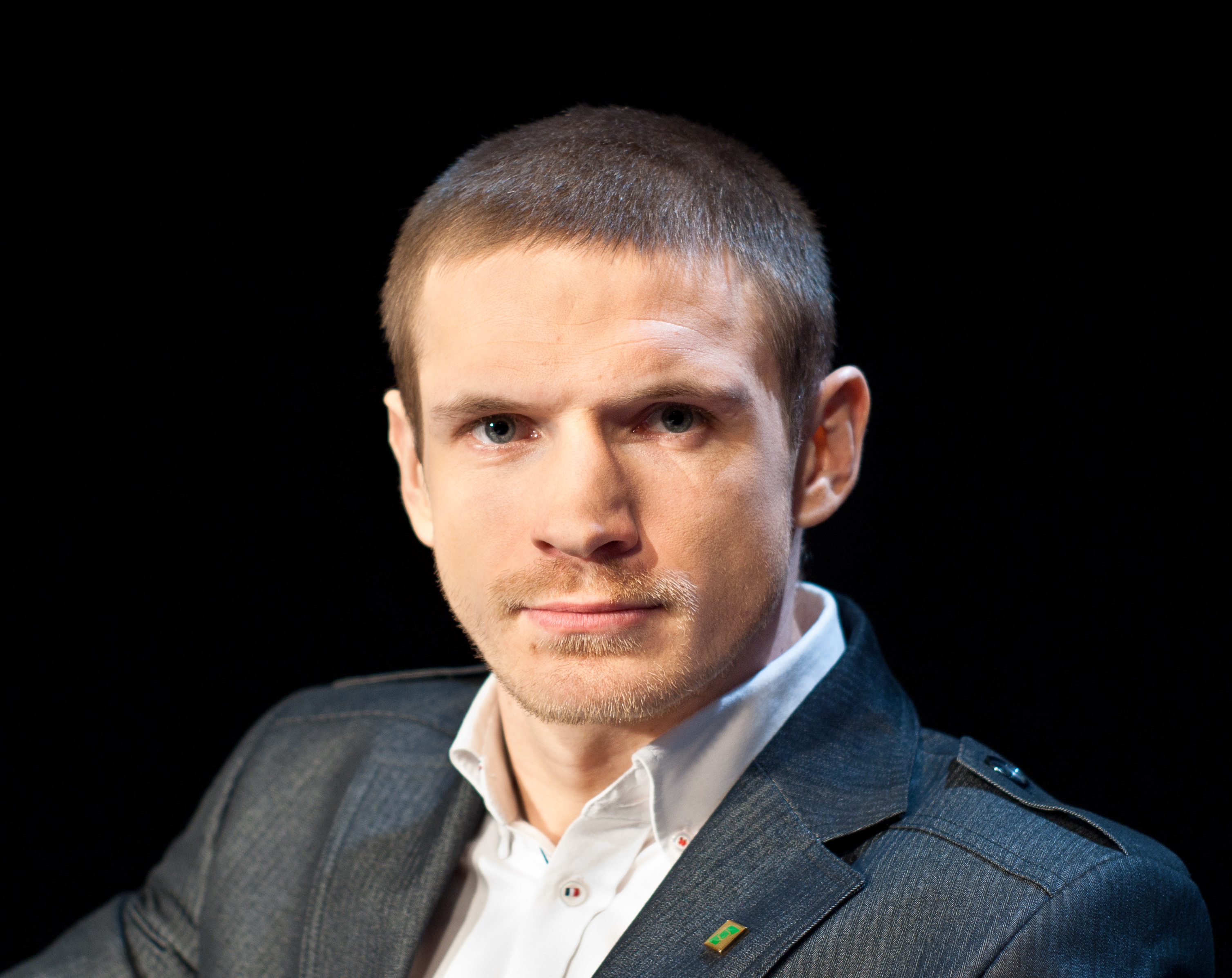
- Proksa in 2012

Personal information
- Nickname: Super G
- Nationality: Polish
- Born: 23 November 1984 (age 41) Mysłowice, Poland
- Height: 174 cm (5 ft 9 in)
- Weight: Super middleweight Middleweight

Boxing career
- Reach: 178 cm (70 in)
- Stance: Southpaw

Boxing record
- Total fights: 33
- Wins: 29
- Win by KO: 21
- Losses: 4

Grzegorz Proksa (born 23 November 1984) is a Polish former professional boxer who competed from 2005 to 2014. He is a two-time former European middleweight champion and a world title challenger.

== Professional boxing record ==
33 fights	29 wins	4 losses
By knockout	21	2
By decision	8	2

No.	Result	Record	Opponent	Type	Round, time	Date	Location	Notes
33	Loss	29–4	(Poland) Maciej Sulęcki	KO	7 (10)	2014-11-08	(Poland) Kraków Arena, Kraków	
32	Loss	29–3	(United States) Sergio Mora	UD	10 (10)	2013-06-28	(United States) Florida	
31	Win	29–2	(Hungary) Norbert Szekeres	UD	6 (6)	2013-02-09	(United Kingdom) Belfast	
30	Loss	28–2	(Kazakhstan) Gennady Golovkin	TKO	5 (12)	2012-09-01	(United States) New York City	For WBA and IBO middleweight titles
29	Win	28–1	(United Kingdom) Kerry Hope	TKO	8 (12)	2012-07-07	(United Kingdom) Yorkshire	Won European middleweight title
28	Win	27–1	(Hungary) Rudolf Varga	TKO	3 (4)	2012-05-10	(Hungary) Budapest	
27	Loss	26–1	(United Kingdom) Kerry Hope	MD	12 (12)	17 Mar 2012	(United Kingdom) Yorkshire	Lost European middleweight title
26	Win	26–0	(Germany) Sebastian Sylvester	RTD	3 (12)	2011-10-01	(Germany) Neubrandenburg	Won European middleweight title
25	Win	25–0	(Hungary) Peter Vecsei	TKO	2 (4)	2011-06-23	(Hungary) Budapest	
24	Win	24–0	(Spain) Pablo Navascues	KO	9 (12)	2011-04-15	(Spain) Leganés	Retained European Union middleweight title
23	Win	23–0	(Republic of Ireland) Joe Rea	KO	4 (8)	2011-03-05	(United Kingdom) Yorkshire	Rea down four times
22	Win	22–0	(Ghana) Theophilus Tetteh	TKO	5 (6)	2010-11-06	(United Kingdom) Newport	
21	Win	21–0	(Latvia) Alex Spitko	TKO	4 (6)	2010-07-09	(United Kingdom) London	Spitko given counts in rounds 2nd and 4th
20	Win	20–0	(United Kingdom) Tyan Booth	TKO	5 (12)	2010-02-12	(United Kingdom) London	Won European Union middleweight title
19	Win	19–0	(United Kingdom) Paul Buchanan	TKO	6 (6)	2009-11-06	(United Kingdom) Magherafelt	
18	Win	18–0	(United Kingdom) Jamie Coyle	TKO	3 (8)	2009-06-12	(United Kingdom) Merseyside	
17	Win	17–0	(United Kingdom) Lee Noble	TKO	3 (6)	2009-03-13	(United Kingdom) Cheshire	
16	Win	16–0	(United Kingdom) Taz Jones	TKO	4 (6)	2008-12-05	(United Kingdom) Dagenham	
15	Win	15–0	(Romania) Mihai Macovei	UD	6 (6)	2008-10-10	(Germany) Barleben	
14	Win	14–0	(Venezuela) Jairo Alvarez	PTS	6 (6)	2008-04-12	(Republic of Ireland) Castlebar	
13	Win	13–0	(Ukraine) Andrei Rimer	UD	6 (6)	2007-12-15	(Germany) Dessau-Roßlau	
12	Win	12–0	(Austria) Gotthard Hinteregger	TKO	2 (4)	2007-10-12	(United Kingdom) Peterlee	
11	Win	11–0	(Romania) Vitalie Mirza	TKO	4 (10)	2007-07-20	(United Kingdom) Wolverhampton	WBC and IBF Youth middleweight titles
10	Win	10–0	(United Kingdom) Ojay Abrahams	RTD	2 (6)	2007-03-02	(United Kingdom) Neath	Abrahams knocked down once in 2nd
9	Win	9–0	(United Kingdom) Steve Conway	PTS	6 (6)	2006-12-15	(United Kingdom) London	
8	Win	8–0	(Argentina) Ignacio Lucero Fraga	UD	10 (10)	2006-10-13	(United Kingdom) Port Talbot	Retained WBC and IBF Youth middleweight titles
7	Win	7–0	(United Kingdom) Ben Hudson	PTS	4 (4)	2006-09-15	(United Kingdom) London	
6	Win	6–0	(Belgium) Kenneth Van Eesvelde	TKO	7 (10)	2006-03-03	(United Kingdom) Hartlepool	Won WBC and IBF Youth middleweight titles
5	Win	5–0	(United States) Gene Newton	TKO	3 (6)	2006-01-21	(United States) Las Vegas	
4	Win	4–0	(United Kingdom) David Kehoe	TKO	3 (6)	2005-09-12	(United Kingdom) Iver Heath	
3	Win	3–0	(United Kingdom) Surinder Sekhon	PTS	4 (4)	2005-09-09	(United Kingdom) Sheffield	Sekhon was down in 3rd
2	Win	2–0	(United States) Sean Rawley Wilson	TKO	2 (4)	2005-05-07	(United States) Las Vegas	
1	Win	1–0	(United States) Adam Capo	TKO	1 (4)	2005-03-05	(United States) Las Vegas	Professional boxing debut
