= Andy Till =

English boxer

Personal information
- Nationality: British
- Born: 22 August 1963 (age 62) Perivale, London, England
- Height: 5 ft 9 in (175 cm)
- Weight: Light middleweight

Boxing career

Boxing record
- Total fights: 24
- Wins: 19
- Win by KO: 9
- Losses: 5
- Draws: 0

Andy Till (born 22 August 1963) is a British former boxer who was British light middleweight champion and WBC International super welterweight champion in the early 1990s.

== Career ==
Born in Perivale, London, Andy Till won the ABA light middleweight title before making his professional debut in September 1986 with a sixth-round stoppage of Peter Reid. After winning his first 5 fights he suffered his first loss, a points defeat to Dean Scarfe, in April 1987. He won his next 7 fights, including a points decision over Wally Swift Jr and a win over Steve Foster, and defeat of Tony Britton to take the vacant BBBofC Southern Area title, setting up a British title eliminator against Ensley Bingham in June 1990; Till was disqualified in the third round for elbowing.

Till won his next 3 fights, including a win over Terry Magee, and in October 1991 beat John Davies on a split decision to take the vacant WBC International super welterweight title. In September 1992 he faced defending champion Wally Swift Jr for the British title, winning narrowly on points to add the British title to his WBC International title. At this time he was also working as a milkman. He made successful defences of his British title against Tony Collins (in December 1992) and Swift (April 1993) to win the Lonsdale Belt outright.

In June 1993 he challenged for Laurent Boudouani's EBU European title, losing via a fourth-round knockout.

In February 1994 he made the third defence of his British title against Robert McCracken, losing on points. He was out of the ring until September 1995 when he lost to Darron Griffiths after being stopped in the fourth round, after which he retired from boxing.

Till had a small role (as 'John the Gun') in Guy Ritchie's 2000 film Snatch.
