= Brian Rose (boxer) =

British professional boxer (born 1985)

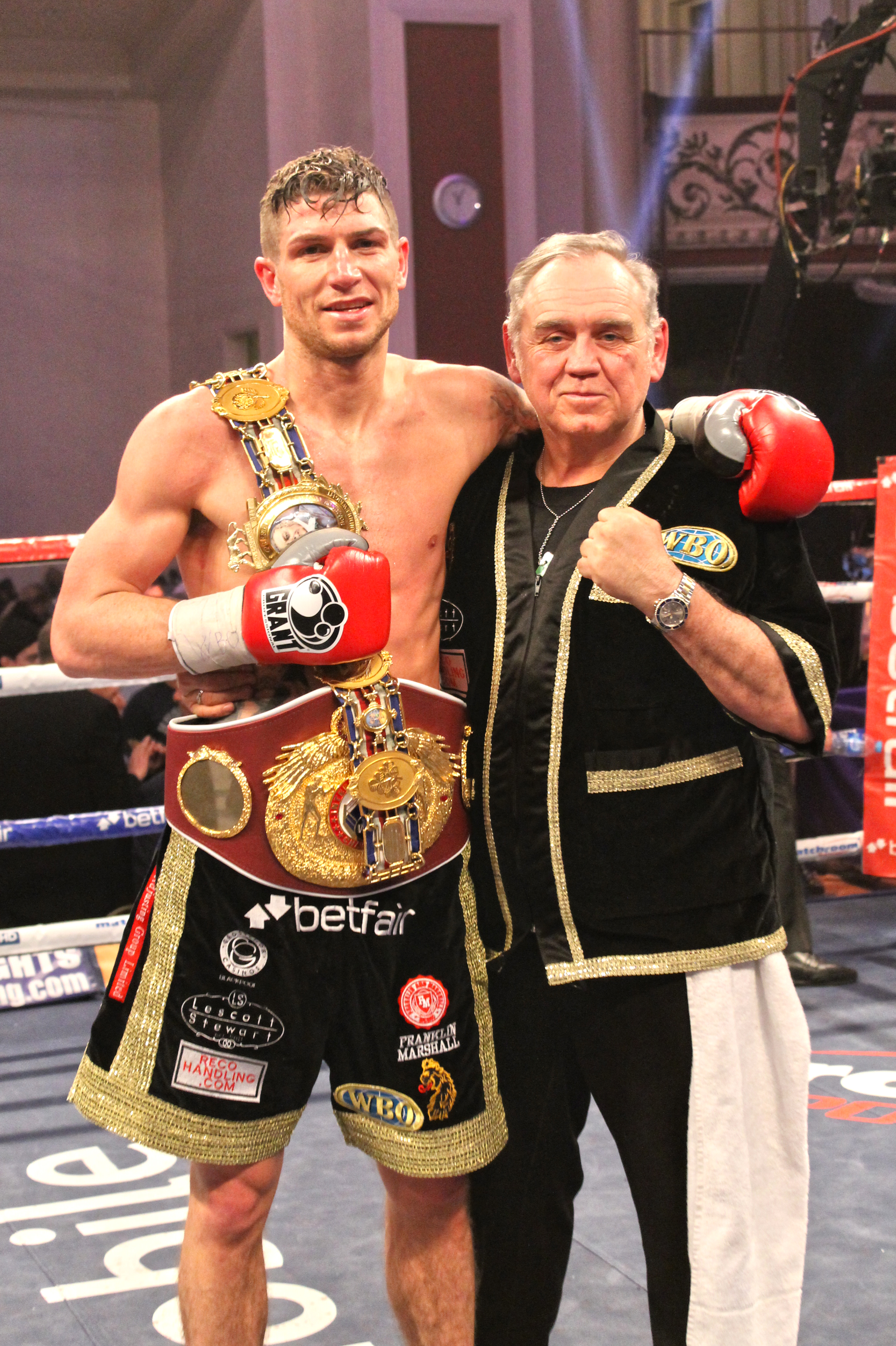

Personal information
- Nickname: The Lion
- Nationality: British
- Born: 15 February 1985 (age 41) Birmingham, England
- Height: 6 ft 0 in (1.83 m)
- Weight: Light middleweight; Middleweight
- Website: www.roseboxing.co.uk

Boxing career
- Stance: Orthodox

Boxing record
- Total fights: 41
- Wins: 32
- Win by KO: 8
- Losses: 8
- Draws: 1

Brian Rose (born 15 February 1985) is a British professional boxer. He challenged once for the WBO light middleweight title in 2014. At regional level, he held the British light middleweight title from 2011 to 2012.

== Amateur career ==
Rose began boxing aged 9 when Dad (Eddie) started him on the path of becoming a boxer due to his hyper activity. It was early on when Eddie was informed that his son was a bit of a natural and so it came to pass that his first amateur fight came just aged 11. He lost, but it didn't put him off and he went on to have 90 amateur fights winning 78 of them and boxing for England. Over 30 of these fights were in different places around the world, the most memorable being in New Delhi, India.

Rose became 6 time national champion, earned a bronze in the European cadet championships and loved every minute of the amateur boxing life and so he took the decision to turn professional and concentrate full-time on being a boxer.

== Professional career ==
=== Early career ===
Rose's professional debut came on 14 December 2005 with a victory over Geraint Harvey at the Hilton Hotel in Blackpool. Another 14 bouts were fought and won (with the exception of 1 draw) before the moment in Brian's career that he describes as his 'lowest moment' whilst fighting for the Central Area Title. Having beaten Jason Rushton at the Bolton Arena in Bolton on 23 October 2009 to win the title, Rose was horrified to learn that Rushton had been rushed to hospital following his collapse in the dressing room after the 10th round stoppage. His opponent was placed in a drug induced coma whilst a bleed on the brain was repaired. This had a detrimental effect on Rose's state of mind. In his next fight he was knocked to the canvas by Max Maxwell at the Leisure Centre Huddersfield. After Rose's only professional defeat to date, he fought Terry Carruthers at the Velodrome in Manchester before getting a shot at the vacant English Title.

=== English Light Middleweight Title ===
Rose earned a shot at the English title when he fought Lee Noble at George Carnall Leisure Centre, Davyhulme, Manchester on 21 November 2010. He won by unanimous decision after 10 rounds of boxing and was faced with the prospect of defending the title, 6 months later, against the undefeated Martin Welsh at Medway Park Leisure Centre, Gillingham on 13 May 2011. After another successful bout, this time a victory by TKO in the 8th round of the contest, Rose was given the opportunity of a shot at the British Title fighting Prince Arron.

=== British Light Middleweight Title ===
Rose fought Prince Arron on 3 December 2011 at Robin Park Centre, Wigan and was awarded a unanimous decision by a dominant points margin. 31 March 2012 saw the first defence of the title and a long overdue return to home soil with the fight taking place at Winter Gardens, Blackpool. The opponent the only man to have beaten 'the lion' Max Maxwell. Rose won a convincing unanimous points decision after 12 rounds.

Next to take on 'the Lion' was Scot Kris Carslaw on 2 June 2012 at Bowlers Exhibition Centre, Manchester. Rose won what has been describes as a 'nip and tuck affair' although the Scot had been cut early in the fight in the 3rd round. In his next fight, which was described as a bout to keep the champion 'ticking over' Brian beat the former World champion Vivian Harris again at the Winter Gardens, Blackpool by way of 3rd-round knockout.

The 3rd defence of Rose's title came against former champion and mandatory challenger Sam Webb on 14 December 2012 again back on home soil at Winter Gardens, Blackpool. This was to be a spicy bout after Webb had accused the champion of evading him after a previous date had fallen through and Rose had fought Vivian Harris instead. On being accused by Webb as being 'a bottler' Rose responded, "I'm not a bottler, I'll fight anyone, I want the belt outright so fighting Sam Webb is perfect for me. I'd beat Sam 9 times out of 10 so why wouldn't I want that fight? ... he need to take his frustration out on promoters not me." The champion won with a unanimous decision having provided the challenger with what was described as 'more eye catching work' an such retained the Lonsdale Belt.

=== WBO Intercontinental Title ===
After joining Eddie Hearn at Matchroom, Rose fought for the vacant WBO Intercontinental belt against faded former World Champion in Joachim Alcine. The bout was won by TKO in the final round and provided Rose with the 7th KO of his career. Although it was largely meaningless yet propelled him to 4th in the WBO rankings and applied pressure on the then-champion to give Rose a shot at the title.

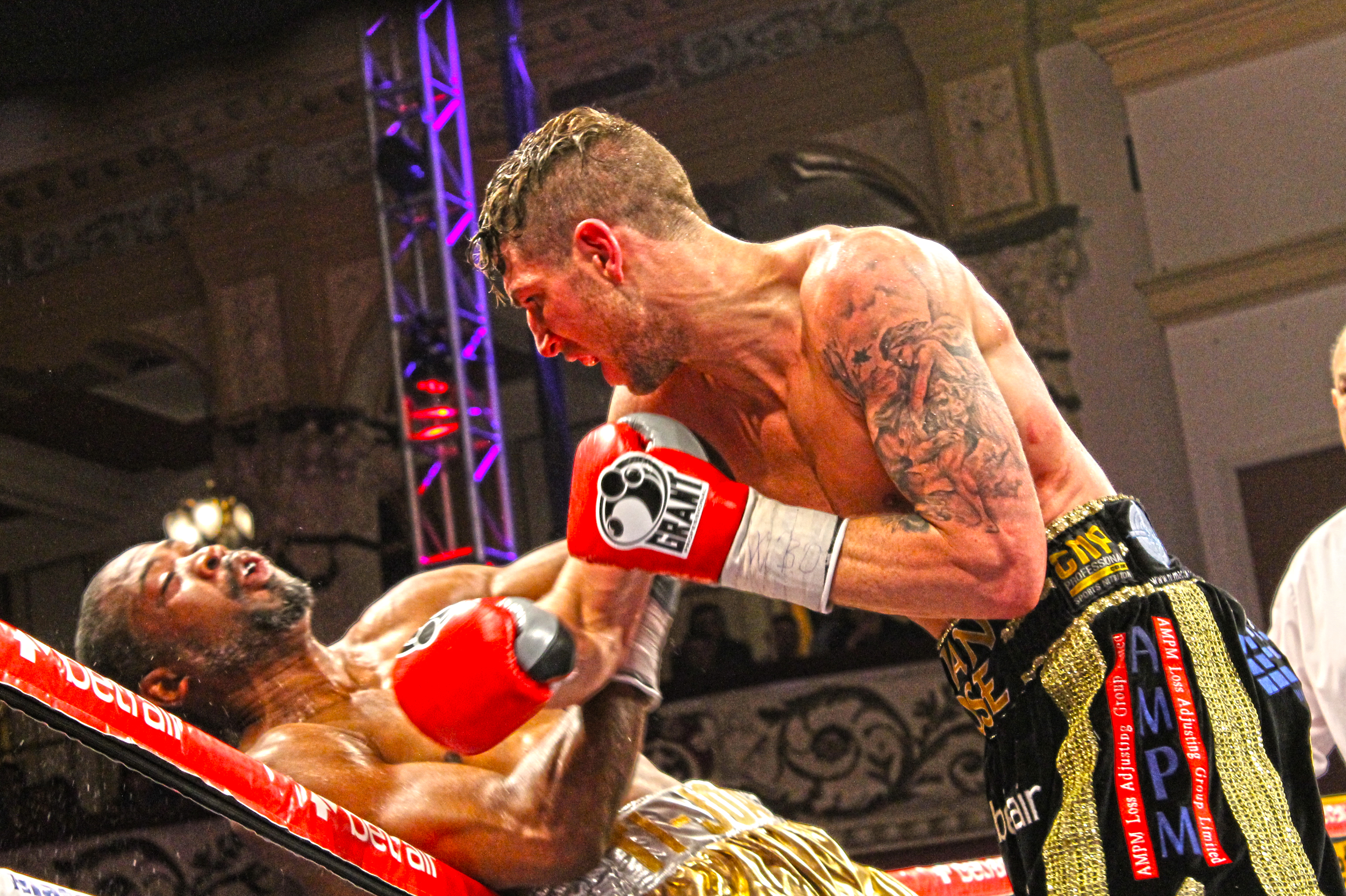
Brian Rose beating Joachim Alcine for the WBO Intercontinental title.

Rose defeated Alexey Ribchev by unanimous decision at Bolton Arena Bolton on 29 June 2013.

=== WBO title fight ===
Rose faced the 5th ranked WBO contender, Argentine, Javier Maciel, in a world title eliminator at Motorpoint Arena, Sheffield on the undercard of Kell Brook v. Vyacheslav Senchenko. Rose won by split decision with scores of 117-111, 116-113, and 113-115. This win places Rose as the mandatory challenger for the winner of the light middleweight title fight between Vanes Martirosyan and Demetrius Andrade. Brian Rose was dominated and knocked out by Demetrius Andrade in brooklyn New York at the Barclays center on 14 June 2014.

On 14 June 2014, fought Demetrius Andrade for the WBO light middleweight title. Andrade was in control for most of the fight, dropping Rose once in the opening round, and once more in the third round, before forcing a stoppage by the referee in round seven.

On 9 April, Rose fought Matthew Macklin. The first part of the fight belonged to Macklin, while Rose upped his work rate in the second half of the fight. That would end up not being enough, as the judges scored the fight 115-111, 115-111 and 113-113 in favor of Macklin.

On 2 August 2019, Rose battled Anthony Fowler to a unanimous decision loss. Rose put up a good fight, showing he still has a lot left in the tank, but obviously well past his prime fighting years.

== Personal details ==
Born in Birmingham in 1985, Rose moved to Blackpool at the age of 8 and began boxing aged 9. He is a father of 3 and partner to Danielle. He is cousin to former Manchester City and Everton defender Joleon Lescott.

== Professional boxing record ==
41 fights	32 wins	8 losses
By knockout	8	4
By decision	24	4
Draws	1	

No.	Result	Record	Opponent	Type	Round, time	Date	Location	Notes
41	Loss	32–8–1	Denis Radovan	RTD	7 (10), 3:00	3 Dec 2021	Harzlandhalle, Ilsenburg, Germany	For IBF European middleweight title
40	Loss	32–7–1	Sergio Martínez	UD	10	25 Sep 2021	Madrid, Spain	
39	Win	32–6–1	Jose Manuel Lopez Clavero	MD	6	20 Mar 2021	Pabellon Municipal, Cataluña, Spain	
38	Loss	31–6–1	Anthony Fowler	UD	10	2 Aug 2019	Exhibition Centre, Liverpool, England	For vacant WBO Inter-Continental middleweight title
37	Win	31–5–1	James Hagenimana	PTS	6	19 Apr 2019	Olympia, Liverpool, England	
36	Win	30–5–1	Alistair Warren	PTS	6	9 Nov 2018	Victoria Warehouse, Manchester, England	
35	Loss	29–5–1	Jack Arnfield	UD	12	25 Mar 2017	Manchester Arena, Manchester, England	For WBA International middleweight title
34	Win	29–4–1	Stiliyan Kostov	PTS	8	22 Oct 2016	Barclaycard Arena, Birmingham, England	
33	Loss	28–4–1	Matthew Macklin	MD	12	9 Apr 2016	The O2 Arena, London, England	For vacant IBF Inter-Continental middleweight title
32	Win	28–3–1	Ruslans Pojonisevs	PTS	8	21 Nov 2015	Manchester Arena, Manchester, England	
31	Win	27–3–1	Carson Jones	UD	12	01 Aug 2015	Craven Park, Hull, England	
30	Loss	26–3–1	Carson Jones	TKO	1 (12), 2:27	14 Feb 2015	Winter Gardens, Blackpool, England	For vacant WBC International light middleweight title
29	Win	26–2–1	Ignacio Lucero Fraga	TKO	1 (8), 2:58	04 Oct 2014	First Direct Arena, Leeds, England	
28	Loss	25–2–1	Demetrius Andrade	TKO	7 (12), 1:19	14 Jun 2014	Barclays Center, New York City, New York, U.S.	For WBO light middleweight title
27	Win	25–1–1	Javier Maciel	SD	12	26 Oct 2013	Motorpoint Arena, Sheffield, England	
26	Win	24–1–1	Alexey Ribchev	PTS	10	29 Jun 2013	Bolton Arena, Bolton, England	
25	Win	23–1–1	Joachim Alcine	TKO	12 (12), 0:59	20 Apr 2013	Winter Gardens, Blackpool, England	Won vacant WBO Inter-Continental light middleweight title
24	Win	22–1–1	Sam Webb	UD	12	14 Dec 2012	Winter Gardens, Blackpool, England	Retained British light middleweight title
23	Win	21–1–1	Vivian Harris	KO	3 (10), 1:48	05 Oct 2012	Winter Gardens, Blackpool, England	
22	Win	20–1–1	Kris Carslaw	UD	12	02 Jun 2012	Bowlers Exhibition Centre, Manchester, England	Retained British light middleweight title
21	Win	19–1–1	Max Maxwell	UD	12	31 Mar 2012	Winter Gardens, Blackpool, England	Retained British light middleweight title
20	Win	18–1–1	Prince Arron	SD	12	03 Dec 2011	Robin Park Centre, Wigan, England	Won British light middleweight title
19	Win	17–1–1	Martin Welsh	TKO	8 (10), 0:53	13 May 2011	Medway Park Leisure Centre, Gillingham, England	Retained English light middleweight title
18	Win	16–1–1	Lee Noble	UD	10	21 Nov 2010	George Carnall Leisure Centre, Manchester, England	Won vacant English light middleweight title
17	Win	15–1–1	Terry Carruthers	PTS	6	17 Sep 2010	Velodrome, Manchester, England	
16	Loss	14–1–1	Max Maxwell	TKO	6 (8), 0:44	28 May 2010	Leisure Centre, Huddersfield, England	
15	Win	14–0–1	Jason Rushton	TKO	10 (10), 2:59	23 Oct 2009	Bolton Arena, Bolton, England	Won vacant British Central Area light middleweight title
14	Win	13–0–1	Francis Tchoffo	PTS	8	10 Jul 2009	Seaburn Centre, Sunderland, England	
13	Win	12–0–1	Matt Scriven	PTS	4	2 May 2009	Crowtree Leisure Centre, Sunderland, England	
12	Win	11–0–1	Jon Harrison	TKO	2 (6), 0:27	24 Jan 2009	Tower Circus, Blackpool, England	
11	Win	10–0–1	Geraint Harvey	PTS	4	12 Oct 2008	Indoor Sports Centre, Leigh, England	
10	Win	9–0–1	Kobe Vandekerkhove	PTS	6	15 Jun 2008	Sutton Sports Centre, St Helens, England	
9	Win	8–0–1	Ernie Smith	PTS	4	26 Apr 2008	Robin Park Centre, Wigan, England	
8	Draw	7–0–1	Manoocha Salari	PTS	6	16 Feb 2008	Tower Circus, Blackpool, England	
7	Win	7–0	Shaun Farmer	TKO	3 (6), 2:56	08 Dec 2007	Robin Park Centre, Wigan, England	
6	Win	6–0	Lee Noble	PTS	4	22 Sep 2007	Robin Park Centre, Wigan, England	
5	Win	5–0	Justin Barnes	TKO	2 (6), 1:16	24 Jun 2007	Robin Park Centre, Wigan, England	
4	Win	4–0	Tony Randell	PTS	6	31 May 2007	Old Trafford Stadium, Manchester, England	
3	Win	3–0	David Kirk	PTS	6	6 May 2007	Leisure Centre, Altrincham, England	
2	Win	2–0	Ernie Smith	PTS	6	25 Feb 2007	George Carnall Leisure Centre, Manchester, England	
1	Win	1–0	Geraint Harvey	PTS	6	14 Dec 2005	Hilton Hotel, Blackpool, England	
