= Muslims Like Us =

British reality television series

Muslims Like Us is a British reality television series shown on BBC Two in December 2016. In the show, ten British Muslims of varying beliefs and backgrounds were placed in a house together. It was produced by Mobeen Azhar.

== Synopsis ==
The ten housemates came from various backgrounds and beliefs: Nabil Abdulrashid, a comedian of Nigerian heritage; Abdul Haqq, a black former boxer born Anthony Small who believes in strict gender segregation; fashion follower Mehreen Baig; Saba, a 76-year-old white convert born Hilary; Ferhan Khan, who is gay; and Zohra, a Shia Muslim.

Events in the series included the housemates going to feed the homeless, with Baig responding to anti-immigrant sentiments from some of them; Bara hugging a member of the English Defence League in an attempt to change his views; and Abdul Haqq's strict views on gender being challenged by others. Abdul Haqq also refused to give an answer on whether it would be wrong to kill Zohra's Shia family.

== Reception ==
There was significant debate from Muslim columnists on whether it was appropriate and representative to include a hardliner such as Abdul Haqq, although it was also pointed out that his fellow housemates disagreed vehemently with his views.

The series won Best Reality and Constructed Factual at the 2017 British Academy Television Awards.

In February 2018, a Sydney-based version of the show was shown on Australia's Special Broadcasting Service. This version included a gay man, a bisexual Sufi woman, a woman in a niqab and a non-practising Shia.
