= Wally Swift Jr =

British former boxer (born 1966)

Personal information
- Nationality: British
- Born: 17 February 1966 (age 60) Nottingham, England
- Height: 5 ft 7 in (170 cm)
- Weight: Light middleweight

Boxing career

Boxing record
- Total fights: 38
- Wins: 26
- Win by KO: 7
- Losses: 11
- Draws: 1

Wally Swift Jr (born 17 February 1966) is a British former boxer who was British light middleweight champion between 1991 and 1992, and also fought for the European title.

== Career ==
Born in Nottingham, Wally Swift Jr is the son of former boxer Wally Swift and brother of Tony Swift, also a boxer. He made his professional début in September 1985, and was unbeaten in his first 11 fights. He suffered his first defeat in January 1987 when he was beaten on points by Dave Dent. During the period from 1987 to 1989 he won 8 fights and lost 7, beating John Ashton, Chris Blake, Alfonso Redondo, and Anibal Miranda, but also losing to Ashton, Terry Magee, Andy Till, and Ensley Bingham.

In April 1990 he beat Shaun Cummins to become BBBofC Midland Area light middleweight champion, successfully defending the title in January 1991 against Paul Wesley. This set him up for a fight against Bingham for the vacant British title 2 months later; Swift stopped Bingham in the fourth round to become British champion. Four months later he made successful first defence against Tony Collins.

In April 1992 he travelled to France to challenge for Jean-Claude Fontana's EBU European title, losing via a unanimous decision. In September 1992 he made the second defence of his British title against Till, losing narrowly on points. The two met again for the title in April 1993, this time with Till stopping Swift in the fourth round.

In September 1993 he challenged for the Midland Area title then held by Steve Goodwin; Goodwin stopped him in the seventh round. The two met again in May 1994, this time with Swift taking a points decision in what would prove to be his final fight.
