= Nicky Wilshire =

English boxer

Personal information
- Nationality: English
- Born: Nicholas C. Wilshire; 3 November 1961 (age 64) Bristol, England
- Height: 5 ft 8 in (173 cm)
- Weight: light middle/middleweight

Boxing career
- Stance: Southpaw

Boxing record
- Total fights: 40
- Wins: 36 (KO 31)
- Losses: 4 (KO 1)

Nicky Wilshire (born 3 November 1961 in Bristol) is an English amateur light middle/middleweight and professional light middle/middleweight boxer of the 1970s and '80s who as an amateur won the 1979 Amateur Boxing Association of England (ABAE) middleweight title, against Douglas James (Royal Antediluvian Order of Buffaloes (RAOB) ABC) (Llanelli/Swansea), boxing out of National Smelting Company ABC (Avonmouth), was runner-up in the 1980 Amateur Boxing Association of England (ABAE) light middleweight title, against James Price (Holy Name ABC) (Fazakerley, Liverpool), boxing out of National Smelting Company ABC (Avonmouth), and represented Great Britain at light middleweight in the Boxing at the 1980 Summer Olympics in Moscow, Soviet Union, defeating Miodrag Perunović of Yugoslavia, and losing to eventual silver medal winner Aleksandr Koshkyn of the Soviet Union, and as a professional won the Commonwealth light middleweight title, and was a challenger for the British Boxing Board of Control (BBBofC) British light middleweight title against Jimmy Cable, and Lloyd Hibbert, his professional fighting weight varied from 152 3/4 lb (69.3 kg; 10 st 12.8 lb), i.e. light middleweight to 158 lb (72 kg; 11 st 4 lb), i.e. middleweight.

== Genealogical information ==
Nicky Wilshire is the younger brother of Deborah A. Wilshire (birth registered April→June 1956 in Bristol District), Luke W. Wilshire (birth registered July→September 1957 in Bristol District), and Stuart C. Wilshire (birth registered January→March 1960 in Bristol District).
