= Matthew Hall (boxer) =

British professional boxer (born 1984)

Personal information
- Nickname: El Torito ("The Little Bull")
- Nationality: British
- Born: 5 July 1984 (age 42) Manchester, England
- Height: 5 ft 7 1/2 in (171 cm)
- Weight: Light middleweight Middleweight

Boxing career
- Reach: 65 in (165 cm)
- Stance: Orthodox

Boxing record
- Total fights: 33
- Wins: 26
- Win by KO: 16
- Losses: 7

Matthew Hall (born 5 July 1984) is a British professional boxer. He is a former Commonwealth light middleweight champion, having also challenged for the British and European light middleweight titles as well as the British and Commonwealth middleweight titles.

== Early professional career ==
Hall's professional debut came in September 2002 with a win over boxing journeyman Pedro Thompson, stopping him in the first round at the MEN Arena in Manchester. His very next fight against the same opponent saw Hall travel to Newcastle in order to beat Thompson again but this time on points over 4 rounds meaning that at the end of his debut year Hall has compiled an unbeaten record of 2-0. Over the course of the next four years, Hall fought fourteen more times against a host of other journeymen winning every fight meaning that his record at the end of 2006 stood at sixteen wins with no defeats. Hall's progress at this time was all the more impressive as in 2003 he had been the victim of a stabbing incident which nearly cost him his life. Speaking to the Daily Mirror about the incident Hall said "I had my bowel perforated six times and lost five or six litres of blood...I was in a bad way and it took me about a year to recover. It's not good getting stabbed." Speaking in 2009 Hall preferred to seek positives from the incident saying "It did my career a favour because it held me back a year or two. I could have had meaningful fights when I was younger and not been ready. I could have been and gone."

== Defeat and fightback ==
Hall's perfect record however was about to be shattered in his first fight of 2007. The fight in July was to come a full year after the last time Hall had stepped into the ring when he had beaten Kevin Phelan with a 1st round stoppage. A year later the boot was to be on the other foot when, at the O2 Arena in London, Martin Concepcion stopped Hall in the first round handing him his first defeat in 5 years as a professional boxer. Hall responded to the defeat with a number of wins over worthy opponents. On 3 December 2007 he defeated Tyan Booth at the Piccadilly Hotel in Manchester and on 22 March 2008 in his first fight of the new year beat the unbeaten Kerry Hope at the International Arena in Cardiff. On 6 September 2008 he beat the former Celtic title challenger Taz Jones and on 10 October 2008 returned to Manchester to beat former Irish champion Ciaran Healy at the MEN Arena. On 12 December 2008 in his last fight of the year, Hall capped off a series of four wins in a row following the Concepcion defeat to stop former Central Area champion Jason Rushton in Widnes.

== Commonwealth Champion ==
Hall's winning run was to pay dividends as on 14 March 2009 Hall defeated defending champion Bradley Pryce to lift the Commonwealth championship knocking Pryce out in the 2nd round. Disappointment following however when on 18 July 2009 Hall lost his title in his first defence at the MEN Arena in Manchester. He was defeated by Anthony Small in a fight which also saw the vacant British title on the line, the referee stopping the fight in the 8th round handing both belts to Small. Following the contest Hall split from his longtime trainer Brian Hughes and moved to try and rebuild with Bolton-based trainer Karl Ince. Speaking of the change in direction Hall said that he had been "embarrassed" by his performance and added that "sometimes you need a change". In his first contest following the defeat on 15 May 2010, Hall scored a 5th round stoppage win over Tony Randell the British Masters champion in a non-title bout.

== European title attempt ==
On 18 September 2010 as part of Frank Warrens 'Magnificent Seven' card, Hall lost for the third time in his career. The fight, for the vacant European title, had come at short notice for Hall following an injury to Ryan Rhodes who had been due to defend the belt on the card. The injury had meant that the belt became vacant and Hall stepped in to fight the Czech Republics Lucas Konecny. In the end Konecny proved too much of a step up for Hall and following two knockdowns in the 6th round the referee stopped the fight. A disappointed Hall announced after the fight that it would be his last that he would retire.

== Return from retirement and British title elimination fight ==
In October 2011, Hall returned to the professional fight game. He suffered a shock defeat to Bulgarian Alex Ribchev on points shown live on new boxing channel BoxNation. Hall then fought and defeated Kris Carslaw in a British light middleweight title elimination fight.

Hall suffered another defeat at the hands of Irish fighter Gary O'Sullivan, at Upton Park, London, on 14 July.

== Professional boxing record ==
33 fights	26 wins	7 losses
By knockout	16	3
By decision	10	4
Draws	0	
No contests	0	

No.	Result	Record	Opponent	Type	Round, time	Date	Location	Notes
33	Win	26–7	(United Kingdom) Dan Blackwell	PTS	6	2015-04-18	(United Kingdom) Sports Centre, Oldham, England	
32	Loss	25–7	(United Kingdom) Billy Joe Saunders	UD	12	2013-03-21	(United Kingdom) York Hall, Bethnal Green, London, England	For Commonwealth (British Empire) Middleweight title. For BBBofC British Middleweight title.
31	Win	25–6	(United Kingdom) Lee Noble	PTS	6	2012-11-30	(United Kingdom) Manchester Arena, Manchester, England	
30	Loss	24–6	(Republic of Ireland) Gary O'Sullivan	UD	12	2012-07-14	(United Kingdom) Upton Park, West Ham, London, England	For vacant WBO International Middleweight title.
29	Loss	24–5	(United Kingdom) Sam Webb	SD	12	2012-04-28	(United Kingdom) Royal Albert Hall, South Kensington, London, England	
28	Win	24–4	(United Kingdom) Kris Carslaw	UD	10	2011-11-25	(United Kingdom) Ravenscraig Sports Centre, Motherwell, Scotland	
27	Loss	23–4	(Bulgaria) Alexey Ribchev	PTS	6	2011-10-28	(United Kingdom) Bowlers Exhibition Centre, Manchester, England	
26	Loss	23–3	(Czech Republic) Lukas Konecny	TKO	6 (12), 1:53	2010-09-18	(United Kingdom) LG Arena, Birmingham, England	For vacant EBU European Super welterweight title.
25	Win	23–2	(United Kingdom) Tony Randell	TKO	3 (6), 1:58	2010-05-15	(United Kingdom) Upton Park, West Ham, London, England	
24	Loss	22–2	(United Kingdom) Anthony Small	TKO	8 (12), 2:21	2009-07-18	(United Kingdom) M.E.N. Arena, Manchester, England	Lost Commonwealth (British Empire) Super welterweight title. For vacant BBBofC British Super welterweight title.
23	Win	22–1	(United Kingdom) Bradley Pryce	TKO	2 (12), 2:59	2009-03-14	(United Kingdom) M.E.N. Arena, Manchester, England	Won Commonwealth (British Empire) Super welterweight title.
22	Win	21–1	(United Kingdom) Jason Rushton	TKO	6 (8), 1:19	2008-12-12	(United Kingdom) Kingsway Leisure Centre, Widnes, England	
21	Win	20–1	(Republic of Ireland) Ciaran Healy	TKO	3 (8), 1:56	2008-10-10	(United Kingdom) Everton Park Sports Centre, Liverpool, England	
20	Win	19–1	(United Kingdom) Taz Jones	TKO	5 (8), 2:56	2008-09-06	(United Kingdom) M.E.N. Arena, Manchester, England	
19	Win	18–1	(Australia) Kerry Hope	TKO	8 (8), 0:53	2008-03-22	(United Kingdom) International Arena, Cardiff, Wales	
18	Win	17–1	(United Kingdom) Tyan Booth	PTS	8	2007-12-03	(United Kingdom) Piccadilly Hotel, Manchester, England	
17	Loss	16–1	(United Kingdom) Martin Concepcion	TKO	1 (8), 2:00	2007-07-14	(United Kingdom) The O2 Arena, Greenwich, London, England	
16	Win	16–0	(United Kingdom) Kevin Phelan	TKO	1 (6), 2:06	2006-07-08	(United Kingdom) Millennium Stadium, Cardiff, Wales	
15	Win	15–0	(United Kingdom) Rob Burton	KO	3 (?), 1:25	2006-03-11	(United Kingdom) Newport Centre, Newport, Wales	
14	Win	14–0	(United Kingdom) Jon Foster	TKO	3 (6), 1:29	2006-01-28	(United Kingdom) Nottingham Arena, Nottingham, England	
13	Win	13–0	(United Kingdom) Matt Scriven	TKO	2 (6), 2:26	2005-06-04	(United Kingdom) M.E.N. Arena, Manchester, England	
12	Win	12–0	(France) Sylvestre Marianini	TKO	1 (6), 2:57	2005-02-11	(United Kingdom) M.E.N. Arena, Manchester, England	
11	Win	11–0	(United Kingdom) Leigh Wicks	PTS	4	2005-01-21	(United Kingdom) Bridgend Leisure Centre, Bridgend, Wales	
10	Win	10–0	(United Kingdom) Jason Collins	PTS	6	2004-12-03	(United Kingdom) Meadowbank Sports Centre, Edinburgh, Scotland	
9	Win	9–0	(United Kingdom) Ojay Abrahams	KO	1 (6), 2:41	2004-11-12	(United Kingdom) North Bridge Leisure Centre, Halifax, West Yorkshire, England	
8	Win	8–0	(United Kingdom) Howard Clarke	TKO	5 (6), 1:58	2004-10-01	(United Kingdom) M.E.N. Arena, Manchester, England	
7	Win	7–0	(Spain) Isidro Gonzalez	TKO	3 (4), 1:19	2004-06-12	(United Kingdom) M.E.N. Arena, Manchester, England	
6	Win	6–0	(United Kingdom) Craig Lynch	PTS	6	2004-05-06	(United Kingdom) Metrodome, Barnsley, England	
5	Win	5–0	(Republic of the Congo) Patrick Cito	PTS	4	2003-05-08	(United Kingdom) Kingsway Leisure Centre, Widnes, England	
4	Win	4–0	(United Kingdom) Brian Coleman	TKO	1 (4), 1:55	2003-04-05	(United Kingdom) M.E.N. Arena, Manchester, England	
3	Win	3–0	(Botswana) Clive Johnson	PTS	4	2003-01-18	(United Kingdom) Guild Hall, Preston, Lancashire, England	
2	Win	2–0	(United Kingdom) Pedro Thompson	PTS	4	2002-12-14	(United Kingdom) Telewest Arena, Newcastle, England	
1	Win	1–0	(United Kingdom) Pedro Thompson	TKO	1 (4), 2:15	2002-09-28	(United Kingdom) M.E.N. Arena, Manchester, England	Professional debut
