= Sam Webb (boxer) =

English boxer (born 1981)

Personal information
- Nationality: British
- Born: 11 April 1981 (age 45) Sidcup, London, England
- Height: 5 ft 9 in (175 cm)
- Weight: Light middleweight

Boxing career
- Stance: Orthodox

Boxing record
- Total fights: 21
- Wins: 18
- Win by KO: 5
- Losses: 3
- Draws: 0

Sam Webb (born 11 April 1981) is a British former professional boxer who competed from 2005 to 2012. He held the British super welterweight title from 2010 to 2011.

== Professional career ==
Webb's professional debut came on 7 October 2005 with a first-round KO victory over Geraint Harvey at the York Hall in Bethnal Green. He fought once more that year defeating Vadzim Astapuk again at the York Hall. Four fights the following year in 2006 resulted in three more wins but also a first career defeat for Webb. The defeat, on cuts on 30 May 2006, was to Alex Stoda a man who in three contests had yet to win any of them meaning that where Webb suffered his first loss, Stoda celebrated his first win. Webb continued to ply his trade with two fights and two wins in 2007 against the likes of Alex Spitko and Ben Hudson. In 2008 he fought five times and saw a gradual improvement in the level of fighter faced with victories over Paul Dyer (18-8) and Gilbert Eastman (20-6), winning each contest.

=== Fight with Gilbert Eastman ===
The fight with Eastman, the younger brother of two time world title challenger Howard Eastman, would not be remembered for Webb's victory but for the injury's suffered by his opponent. Having been floored in the final round of their eight-round fight, the fight was stopped with Eastman returning to the dressing room only to collapse and be taken to hospital. Eastman's manager Winston Fuller said "It wasn't a punishing fight at all. He boxed brilliantly in the first four or five rounds and there wasn't a lot in it until he got caught by a couple of shots in the final round. He was well prepared for the fight and 100 per cent fit. There were no weight problems, nothing." Having been taken to the Royal London Hospital, doctor's worked to remove a blood clot on his brain saying that they expected him to make a "full recovery".

=== British Champion ===
Now with a record of 12–1, Webb begun 2009 with a victory over Max Maxwell at the leisure centre in Newham. On 2 May 2009 he travelled to Sunderland to face Thomas McDonagh in an eliminator for the full British title, winning on points over 10 rounds, it was the first time that Webb had gone such a distance. Despite the win, his chance to fight for the title did not happen that year with his opponent McDonagh actually getting the nod to fight the champion Anthony Small before Webb in what was a voluntary defence for Small. Webb finished off the year with a six-round points win over Paul Morby at the Newport Centre in Newport. In his first fight of 2010 and now boasting a record of 15-1 Webb got his chance on 26 March and defeated Small on a close majority points decision at the Goresbrook Leisure Centre in Dagenham. The fight went the distance despite Webb suffering a bad cut in the fifth round and a doctor's inspection of the cut in the sixth. Webb, who had also defeated Small on two occasions in the amateurs said following the win "I managed to dig deep and pull it out, I'm over the Moon". On 16 October 2010 Webb made the first defence of his title in Limehouse, London. His opponent Martin Concepcion was the reigning Midlands Area champion but struggled throughout the fight as Webb built up to what looked like being a comfortable points victory prior to scoring an 11th-round knockout.

Webb lost the title to Prince Arron in his second defence of the title at Gillingham in Kent. The fight was stopped in the 12th round with Webb considered by the referee to be in no position to continue following a series of knockdowns during the fight.

== Professional boxing record ==
21 fights	18 wins	3 losses
By knockout	5	2
By decision	13	1
Draws	0	
No contests	0	

No.	Result	Record	Opponent	Type	Round, time	Date	Location	Notes
21	Loss	18–3	(United Kingdom) Brian Rose	UD	12	14 Dec 2012	(United Kingdom) Winter Gardens, Blackpool, England	For British super welterweight title
20	Win	18–2	(United Kingdom) Matthew Hall	SD	12	28 Apr 2012	(United Kingdom) Royal Albert Hall, London, England	
19	Loss	17–2	(United Kingdom) Prince Arron	TKO	12 (12), 1:47	13 May 2011	(United Kingdom) Medway Park Leisure Centre, Gillingham, England	Lost British super welterweight title
18	Win	17–1	(United Kingdom) Martin Concepcion	KO	11 (12), 2:20	16 Oct 2010	(United Kingdom) The Troxy, London, England	Retained British super welterweight title
17	Win	16–1	(United Kingdom) Anthony Small	MD	12	26 Mar 2010	(United Kingdom) Goresbrook Leisure Centre, Dagenham, England	Won British super welterweight title
16	Win	15–1	(United Kingdom) Paul Morby	PTS	6	11 Dec 2009	(United Kingdom) Newport Centre, Newport, Wales	
15	Win	14–1	(United Kingdom) Thomas McDonagh	PTS	10	2 May 2005	(United Kingdom) Crowtree Leisure Centre, Sunderland, England	
14	Win	13–1	(United Kingdom) Max Maxwell	PTS	8	20 Mar 2009	(United Kingdom) Newham Leisure Centre, London, England	
13	Win	12–1	(United Kingdom) Gilbert Eastman	TKO	8 (8), 2:59	17 Oct 2008	(United Kingdom) York Hall, London, England	
12	Win	11–1	(United Kingdom) Paul Dyer	PTS	6	13 Jun 2008	(United Kingdom) Mountbatten Centre, Portsmouth, England	
11	Win	10–1	(United Kingdom) David Kirk	PTS	6	2 May 2008	(United Kingdom) Harvey Hadden Leisure Centre, Nottingham, England	
10	Win	9–1	(United Kingdom) Paul Royston	PTS	6	2 Feb 2008	(United Kingdom) ExCeL Arena, London, England	
9	Win	8–1	(United Kingdom) Duncan Cottier	PTS	4	12 Jan 2008	(United Kingdom) York Hall, London, England	
8	Win	7–1	(United Kingdom) Ben Hudson	PTS	4	15 Jun 2007	(United Kingdom) National Sports Centre, London, England	
7	Win	6–1	(Latvia) Alex Spitko	TKO	1 (4), 2:11	27 Apr 2007	(United Kingdom) Wembley Arena, London, England	
6	Win	5–1	(United Kingdom) David Kirk	PTS	4	17 Nov 2006	(United Kingdom) York Hall], London, England	
5	Loss	4–1	(Estonia) Aleksei Stoda	TKO	3 (6), 0:57	30 May 2006	(United Kingdom) York Hall, London, England	
4	Win	4–0	(Latvia) Gatis Skuja	PTS	4	24 Mar 2006	(United Kingdom) York Hall, London, England	
3	Win	3–0	(Belarus) Aliaksandr Zhuk	PTS	4	27 Jan 2006	(United Kingdom) Goresbrook Leisure Centre, Dagenham, England	
2	Win	2–0	(Belarus) Vadzim Astapuk	TKO	2 (4), 2:55	4 Nov 2005	(United Kingdom) York Hall, London, England	
1	Win	1–0	(United Kingdom) Geraint Harvey	KO	1 (4), 2:57	7 Oct 2005	(United Kingdom) York Hall, London, England	

Preceded by Anthony Small	British Light Middleweight Champion; March 26, 2010 - May 13, 2011	Succeeded by Prince Arron
