= Gary O'Sullivan =

Irish boxer (born 1984)

Personal information
- Nickname: The Celtic Warrior
- Nationality: Irish
- Born: 14 July 1984 (age 42) Mahon, Cork, Ireland
- Height: 5 ft 10 in (178 cm)
- Weight: Middleweight

Boxing career
- Reach: 70 1/2 in (179 cm)
- Stance: Orthodox

Boxing record
- Total fights: 37
- Wins: 31
- Win by KO: 21
- Losses: 6

Gary "Spike" O'Sullivan (born 14 July 1984) is an Irish professional boxer. Between 2009 and 2017, he held multiple middleweight championships at regional level including the Irish title.

He also acted and performed stunts in the 2007 film Strength and Honour.

== Boxing career ==
=== O'Sullivan vs. Hall ===
O'Sullivan defeated Matthew Hall in a close contest, at Upton Park, London, on 14 July 2012 on the undercard of David Haye vs. Derek Chisora, to win the WBO intercontinental middleweight title.

=== O'Sullivan vs. Nunez ===
It was announced following this defeat of Larry Smith that O'Sullivan would take on former world contender Milton Nunez. O'Sullivan, before the fight, described the bout as "the most important fight of my life". He started the fight well with some solid body shots easily claiming the first round. He knocked Nunez down in the second round and ultimately scored an impressive victory, by TKO, over Nunez in the third round.

=== O'Sullivan vs. Douglas ===
After a loss to Chris Eubank Jr., O'Sullivan won four straight fights to earn a December 2017 bout against rising prospect Antoine Douglas on HBO. While the fight was meant to be a showcase for Douglas, O'Sullivan won a gritty battle by seventh-round knockout.

=== O'Sullivan vs. Lemieux ===
After beating Berlin Abreu on 4 May, it was announced that O'Sullivan would be fighting on the undercard of Canelo Álvarez vs. Gennady Golovkin II on 15 September. A fight with David Lemieux, a fight that Spike had previously chased in recent years, was mooted but O'Sullivan seemed reluctant to give Lemieux the fight as he had previously turned it down himself. However, after weeks of back and forth verbal jousting online, the fight was officially made with both fighters declaring that they will knock the other out and many tipping it as a potential fight of the night.

O’Sullivan was knocked out in the first round.

In his first comeback fight, O'Sullivan defeated Gabor Gorbics on points in his home country of Ireland.

In his next fight, O'Sullivan recorded his second win in a row, defeating overmatched opponent Khiary Gray in six rounds.

==== O'Sullivan vs Munguia ====
On 11 January 2020, O'Sullivan fought former world champion Jaime Munguia, who was ranked #1 by the WBO and #3 by the WBC at middleweight. O'Sullivan put up a great fight, but in the end Munguia just had too much left in the tank, as he finished the Irishman in the eleventh round via TKO.

== Professional boxing record ==
36 fights	31 wins	5 losses
By knockout	21	4
By decision	9	1
By disqualification	1	0

No.	Result	Record	Opponent	Type	Round, time	Date	Location	Notes
38	Win	32–6	Mateusz Pawlowski	PTS	6	10 Oct 2025	The National Stadium, Dublin, Ireland	
37	Loss	31–6	Sofiane Khati	PTS	8	17 Mar 2024	TF Royal Theatre, Castlebar, Ireland	
36	Loss	31–5	Erislandy Lara	TKO	8 (12), 0:23	28 May 2022	Barclays Center, New York City, New York, U.S.	For WBA (Regular) middleweight title
35	Win	31–4	Nodar Robakidze	UD	6	29 May 2021	Country Hall Liège, Belgium	
34	Loss	30–4	Jaime Munguia	TKO	11 (12), 2:17	11 Jan 2020	Alamodome, San Antonio, Texas, U.S.	
33	Win	30–3	Khiary Gray	TKO	6 (10), 2:07	16 Mar 2019	House of Blues, Boston, Massachusetts, U.S.	
32	Win	29–3	Gabor Gorbics	PTS	8	7 Dec 2018	Royal Theatre, Castlebar, Ireland	
31	Loss	28–3	David Lemieux	KO	1 (12), 2:44	15 Sep 2018	T-Mobile Arena, Paradise, Nevada, U.S.	
30	Win	28–2	Berlin Abreu	RTD	3 (10), 3:00	4 May 2018	StubHub Center, Carson, California, U.S.	
29	Win	27–2	Antoine Douglas	TKO	7 (10), 1:03	16 Dec 2017	Place Bell, Laval, Quebec, Canada	Won vacant WBO Inter-Continental middleweight title
28	Win	26–2	Nick Quigley	TKO	4 (10), 1:23	30 Sep 2017	House of Blues, Boston, Massachusetts, U.S.	
27	Win	25–2	Chauncey Fields	KO	2 (8), 2:26	13 May 2017	Plainridge Park Casino, Plainville, Massachusetts, U.S.	
26	Win	24–2	Ronald Montes	RTD	3 (8), 3:00	18 Mar 2017	House of Blues, Boston, Massachusetts, U.S.	
25	Win	23–2	Jaime Barboza	UD	8	17 Sep 2016	Bank of New Hampshire Pavilion, Gilford, New Hampshire, U.S.	
24	Loss	22–2	Chris Eubank Jr.	RTD	7 (12), 3:00	12 Dec 2015	The O2 Arena, Greenwich, London, England	
23	Win	22–1	David Toribio	KO	2 (10)	10 Oct 2015	Lowell Memorial Auditorium, Lowell, Massachusetts, U.S.	
22	Win	21–1	Melvin Betancourt	KO	2 (10)	23 May 2015	Agganis Arena, Boston, Massachusetts, U.S.	
21	Win	20–1	Milton Núñez	TKO	3 (8), 2:20	14 Mar 2015	Madison Square Garden, New York City, New York, U.S.	
20	Win	19–1	Larry Smith	TKO	2 (6), 2:14	26 Feb 2015	Memorial Hall, Melrose, Massachusetts, U.S.	
19	Win	18–1	Anthony Fitzgerald	TKO	1 (10), 1:15	15 Nov 2014	3Arena, Dublin, Ireland	
18	Win	17–1	Jose Medina	MD	6	5 Jun 2014	House of Blues, Boston, Massachusetts, U.S.	
17	Loss	16–1	Billy Joe Saunders	UD	12	20 Jul 2013	Wembley Arena, Wembley, London, England	Lost WBO International middleweight title
16	Win	16–0	Tadas Jonkus	TKO	3 (8), 2:17	3 May 2013	Carlton Hotel Tyrrelstown, Dublin, Irelabd	Retained WBO International middleweight title
15	Win	15–0	Matthew Hall	UD	12	14 Jul 2012	Upton Park, West Ham, London, England	Won vacant WBO International middleweight title
14	Win	14–0	Paul Morby	PTS	6	10 Mar 2012	Braehead Arena, Glasgow, Scotland	
13	Win	13–0	Robert Long	TKO	1 (10), 2:34	25 Jun 2011	National Stadium, Dublin, Ireland	Retained Irish middleweight title
12	Win	12–0	Ryan Clark	KO	1 (4), 1:34	21 May 2011	O2 Arena, Greenwich, London, England	
11	Win	11–0	Sylvain Touzet	TKO	3 (6)	26 Jun 2010	Neptune Sports Arena, Cork, Ireland	
10	Win	10–0	Ciaran Healy	PTS	10	14 Dec 2009	Neptune Sports Arena, Cork, Ireland	Won vacant Irish middleweight title
9	Win	9–0	Arturs Jaskuls	PTS	6	25 Jul 2009	National Basketball Arena, Dublin, Irelabd	
8	Win	8–0	Marcin Piatkowski	KO	1 (6), 2:35	25 Apr 2009	Silver Springs Moran Hotel, Cork, Ireland	
7	Win	7–0	Jimmy LeBlanc	DQ	4 (8), 1:50	14 Mar 2009	Dorchester Armory, Dorchester, Massachusetts, U.S.	
6	Win	6–0	Idiozan Matos	TKO	3 (6), 1:44	26 Oct 2008	Gleneagle Hotel, Killarney, Ireland	
5	Win	5–0	Sergejs Volodins	RTD	1 (6), 3:00	13 Sep 2008	Neptune Sports Arena, Cork, Ireland	
4	Win	4–0	Eugen Stan	PTS	6	5 Jul 2008	National Basketball Arena, Dublin, Ireland	
3	Win	3–0	Tye Williams	TKO	1 (4)	15 Apr 2008	National Stadium, Dublin, Ireland	
2	Win	2–0	Robert Harris	TKO	1 (4)	15 Mar 2008	Orpheum Theater, Boston, Massachusetts, U.S.	
1	Win	1–0	Peter Dunn	TKO	6 (6), 1:10	26 Jan 2008	Neptune Sports Arena, Cork, Ireland	

== Filmography ==
- Strength and Honour (2007, stunts)
- The Last Round (2012, short film, as Opponent)
- The Vein Within (2013, as Steven Murphy)
