= Prince Rodney =

British former boxer (born 1958)

Personal information
- Nationality: British
- Born: Noel Rodney; 31 October 1958 (age 67) London, England
- Height: 5 ft 11 in (1.80 m)
- Weight: Light middleweight

Boxing career

Boxing record
- Total fights: 41
- Wins: 31
- Win by KO: 16
- Losses: 9
- Draws: 1

Noel "Prince" Rodney (born 31 October 1958) is a British former boxer who was British light middleweight champion between 1983 and 1986.

== Career ==
Born in London, Rodney spent nine years living in Grenada before settling in Huddersfield in the late 1960s. He attended Deighton High School and as a teenager was a promising athlete and a member of Longwood Harriers before taking up boxing.

He made his professional debut in October 1977, fighting under the name Prince Rodney. With twelve wins from his first thirteen fights during his first year as a pro, in October 1978 he beat Joe Lally at the Tower Circus, Blackpool to win the BBBofC Central Area light middleweight title. He lost his next fight, against Carl Bailey, but won eight of his next nine fights, leading to a British title eliminator against Charlie Malarkey at the Kelvin Hall in March 1980; Malarkey took a points decision. In June 1981 he fought British champion Herol Graham at the City Hall, Sheffield, Graham stopping him in the first round. In September 1982 he fought another British title eliminator against Graeme Ahmed, this time winning via a third round stoppage.

In October 1983 he faced Jimmy Batten at the Royal Albert Hall for the British title vacated by Graham. Rodney stopped Batten in the sixth round to become British champion. He was forced to relinquish the title after sustaining an eye injury whilst sparring with Mark Kaylor, but after regaining his fitness he won back the title in 1985, knocking out defending champion Jimmy Cable in the first round, and successfully defended it against Mick Courtney to win the Lonsdale Belt outright. He lost a non-title fight in November against Adam George and his second defence of the British title also ended in defeat, when he was knocked out in the ninth round by Chris Pyatt at the Royal Albert Hall in February 1986.

Rodney beat Carlton Warren in November 1986 but was then out of the ring until May 1989, when he lost to Sean Heron on points over six rounds. He had his final fight in April 1990, Terry Dixon stopping him in a cruiserweight contest in the seventh round.

In November 2008 Rodney opened the Prince Rodney Titans Amateur Boxing Club in Linthwaite.
