= Jimmy Cable =

English boxer (1957–2020)

Personal information
- Nickname: Jimmy
- Nationality: English
- Born: James T. Cable; 7 September 1957 Penge, England
- Died: 15 August 2020 (aged 62)
- Weight: light middleweight

Boxing career

Boxing record
- Total fights: 41
- Wins: 30 (KO 9)
- Win by KO: 9
- Losses: 9 (KO 5)
- Draws: 2
- No contests: 0

James T. Cable (7 September 1957 — 15 August 2020), also known by the nickname of "Jimmy", was an English professional light middleweight boxer. In the 1980s, Cable won the Southern (England) Area light middleweight title, the British light middleweight title, and the EBU (European) light middleweight title.

== Background ==
Cable was born in Penge. During his professional boxing career he worked as a painter and decorator.

== Boxing career ==
=== Amateur ===
Cable first starting boxing for Orpington & District ABC, before moving to Fitzroy lodge as a senior.

Cable was the president of Orpington & District ABC until 1995

=== Professional ===
==== Early career ====
Cable began his professional career on 18 November 1980, when he outpointed Mick Miller over six rounds at the York Hall, Bethnal Green. He won his next thirteen contests, including a win over Gary Cooper, before being knocked out in two rounds by the Jamaican-born, Cardiff-based veteran Horace McKenzie at the Royal Albert Hall on 17 March 1982. He recovered to win his next four contests before being narrowly outpointed by the former British light-middleweight champion Jimmy Batten at the Albert Hall in February 1983. He then won his next six contests including a points victory over Nick Wilshire in May 1983 when he had recovered from two knockdowns to win on points.

==== British and European championships ====
Cable won the vacant British Light-Middleweight title in February 1984 by outpointing Nick Wilshire over twelve rounds by 118 points to 117 at the Royal Albert Hall. The Glasgow Herald's correspondent described it as a victory for the "rapier" over the "bludgeon". A month after winning the British title at the Albert Hall, Cable was matched against the American Buster Drayton at the same venue. Drayton, who had been acting as a sparring partner to Marvin Hagler knocked Cable down in 45 seconds of the first round and ended the fight with a "sweeping" left hook 40 seconds later to inflict the third defeat of Cable's career. Drayton later won the IBF championship at the same weight.

In May Cable travelled to Toulouse in France to challenge for the EBU light middleweight title against Said "Freddy" Skouma. Cable won the title by knocking out his French opponent in the eleventh round. Cable reign as European champion lasted just over four months: on 28 September he was outpointed over twelve rounds by Georg Steinherr in Munich. Cable successfully defended his remaining championship belt in February 1985 at the Alexandra Palace, outpointing Gary Cooper, a Hampshire boxer who went on to win the same title in 1988.

Three months later, Cable defended his British title against the former champion Prince Rodney at Hastings Pier Ballroom. Cable lost his title and was knocked out in less than two minutes of the first round.

==== Later career ====
After the loss of his titles, Cable continued to box under a British Boxing Board of Control license until 1988, recording three wins, two draws and four defeats.

==== Unlicensed boxing ====
After his retirement from professional boxing, Cable had some success as an unlicensed boxer. He claimed to have earned more money winning an unlicensed bout in Streatham in 1993 than he had done in winning the British championship against Wilshire.
