= Prince Arron =

English boxer

Personal information
- Nickname: Prince
- Nationality: British
- Born: Arron Jones; 27 December 1987 (age 38) Crumpsall, Lancashire, England
- Height: 6 ft 3 in (1.91 m)
- Weight: Middleweight; Light Middleweight

Boxing career
- Stance: Orthodox

Boxing record
- Total fights: 29
- Wins: 23
- Win by KO: 5
- Losses: 5
- Draws: 1

Arron Jones (born 27 December 1987), best known by his nickname of "Prince Arron", is a British former professional boxer who competed from 2006 to 2013. He is a former British Masters champion. He held the British Light middleweight title in 2011 by stopping Sam Webb to claim the belt and challenged once for the EBU European middleweight title in 2013.

== Early professional career ==
Arron's professional debut came on 28 April 2006 with a victory over Tommy Jones at the Midland Hotel in Manchester. He fought and won four more times that year before meeting undefeated fellow prospect Anthony Small at the Elephant and Castle in Southwark on 21 October 2006. The fight, Arron's fifth, resulted in a second round stoppage defeat against Small who would go on to become the British and Commonwealth champion in later fights. Arron got back to winning ways in his next fight against journeyman Rocky muscas but suffered defeat once more in his seventh professional contest against undefeated Leeds fighter Danny Reynolds. The fight on 3 December 2006, Droylsden, resulted in a points loss for Prince Arron over six rounds meaning that Arron in his debut year as a professional finished with a record of 7–0.

=== British Masters Title and fight with Duddy ===
In 2007 Arron kept up his busy schedule and begun the year well, when on 18 February 2007, he defeated George Hillyard at the York hall. One victory followed against Sherman Alleyne before meeting Cello Renda at the Midland Hotel for the British Masters Middleweight title. The fight against Renda was the Droylsden man's first 10 rounder and resulted in a distance win and a first career title for the Princess. Further wins followed in 2007 against Olufemi Moses and Martin Marshall Mathers before travelling to Dublin for a high-profile clash with Irish fighter John Duddy. The fight with Duddy on 20 October 2007 resulted in a third career defeat for Arron as the unbeaten and more experienced Duddy stopped him in the second round.

== Prizefighter win ==
Arron fought just once in 2008 defeating Tony Randell before returning in 2009 and scoring wins over the likes of Dee Mitchell, Danny Gwilym and Taz Jones. On 18 December 2009 however Arron's hopes of completing a series of wins in the year were dashed with his first career draw against Max Maxwell over six rounds at the York Hall. In 2010 Arron was chosen as a participant in the tenth installment of the Prizefighter series which this time featured light middleweights. The tournament on 26 February 2010 pitched Arron in the quarter-finals against George Hillyard with the Prince winning on points. The semi-finals resulted in a career best win for Arron with a win over the tournament favourite and former Commonwealth champion Bradley Pryce.In the final Arron faced former amateur champion Brett Flournoy who had fought his way to the final with wins over the undefeated Steve O'Meara and former British title challenger Danny Butler. A close final turned the way of Arron, when in the third and final round, the tournaments only knockdown resulted in all three judges scoring unanimous decisions.

Arron returned to the ring following the Prizefighter success on 7 May 2010 for a re-match with Max Maxwell, the man with whom he had drawn against the previous year. The fight in Widnes resulted in a much clearer result this time with Arron handed a points win over 8 rounds. In his next fight on 9 July 2010 he had a victory over former victim Tony Randell, stopping him in the sixth round. On 25 September 2010 Arron recorded his third consecutive win following his Prizefighter victory beating Hungarian Mihaly Kotai with sixth round stoppage.

=== British Light Middleweight Title ===
Arron challenged for the British light middleweight title against reigning champion Sam Webb on 13 May 2011. Webb, who had won the title against Anthony Small and made one defence against Martin Concepcion got the better of the early exchanges before a right hook sent the champion to the canvas in the 5th round. Webb managed to hold out despite an onslaught of punches to the end of the round and was eventually stopped in the 12th. Of the first knockdown Arron questioned the decision not to halt the fight in the 5th saying: "He didn't throw a shot for about two minutes after he went down" and adding: "I was hitting him with big shots and he was just fighting on instinct". Speaking of his achievement, Arron's trainer Bob Shannon said: "He's going to be a force to be reckoned with...he's got so much potential, he could go all the way".

He later won the British title from Sam Webb in London in 2011. Arron has since lost the British title to Blackpool-based fighter Brian Rose, after a split decision at Wigan's Robin Park Arena.

== Professional boxing record ==
29 fights	23 wins	5 losses
By knockout	5	2
By decision	18	3
Draws	1	

No.	Result	Record	Opponent	Type	Round, time	Date	Location	Notes
29	Loss	23–5–1	(Ukraine) Max Bursak	UD	12	2013-07-13	Salle des Etoiles, Monte Carlo, Monaco	
28	Win	23–4–1	(United Kingdom) Tyan Booth	PTS	6	2013-03-08	(United Kingdom) Bowlers Exhibition Centre, Manchester, England	
27	Win	22–4–1	(United Kingdom) Kieron Gray	TKO	3 (8), 2:58	2012-11-19	(United Kingdom) Radisson Blu Hotel, Glasgow, Scotland	
26	Loss	21–4–1	(United Kingdom) Brian Rose	SD	12	2011-12-03	(United Kingdom) Robin Park Centre, Wigan, England	Lost BBBofC British Super welterweight title.
25	Win	21–3–1	(United Kingdom) Sam Webb	TKO	12 (12), 1:47	2011-05-13	(United Kingdom) Medway Park Sports Centre, Gillingham, England	Won BBBofC British Super welterweight title.
24	Win	20–3–1	(Hungary) Mihaly Kotai	TKO	6 (6), 1:18	2010-09-25	(United Kingdom) Robin Park Centre, Wigan, England	
23	Win	19–3–1	(United Kingdom) Tony Randell	TKO	6 (6), 2:08	2010-07-09	(United Kingdom) York Hall, Bethnal Green, London, England	
22	Win	18–3–1	(United Kingdom) Max Maxwell	PTS	8	2010-05-07	(United Kingdom) Kingsway Leisure Centre, Widnes, England	
21	Win	17–3–1	(United Kingdom) Brett Flournoy	UD	3	2010-02-26	(United Kingdom) York Hall, Bethnal Green, London, England	Prizefighter 10: light middleweight final
20	Win	16–3–1	(United Kingdom) Bradley Pryce	UD	3	2010-02-26	(United Kingdom) York Hall, Bethnal Green, London, England	Prizefighter 10: light middleweight semi-final
19	Win	15–3–1	(United Kingdom) George Hillyard	UD	3	2010-02-26	(United Kingdom) York Hall, Bethnal Green, London, England	Prizefighter 10: light middleweight quarter-final
18	Draw	14–3–1	(United Kingdom) Max Maxwell	PTS	6	2009-12-18	(United Kingdom) York Hall, Bethnal Green, London, England	
17	Win	14–3	(United Kingdom) Taz Jones	PTS	8	2009-09-04	(United Kingdom) Eston Sports Academy, Middlesbrough, England	
16	Win	13–3	(United Kingdom) Danny Gwilym	PTS	4	2009-03-28	(United Kingdom) Leisure Centre, Altrincham, England	
15	Win	12–3	(United Kingdom) Dee Mitchell	PTS	6	2009-02-06	(United Kingdom) Aston Events Centre, Birmingham, England	
14	Win	11–3	(United Kingdom) Tony Randell	TKO	4 (6), 2:16	2008-10-03	(United Kingdom) Meadowside Leisure Centre, Burton upon Trent, England	
13	Loss	10–3	(Republic of Ireland) John Duddy	TKO	2 (10), 2:33	2007-10-20	(Republic of Ireland) National Stadium, Dublin, Ireland	
12	Win	10–2	(United Kingdom) Martin Marshall	PTS	4	2007-10-12	(United Kingdom) Peterlee Leisure Centre, Peterlee, England	
11	Win	9–2	(Nigeria) Olufemi Moses	PTS	6	2007-09-22	(United Kingdom) Leofric Hotel, Coventry, England	
10	Win	8–2	(United Kingdom) Cello Renda	PTS	10	2007-06-29	(United Kingdom) Midland Hotel, Manchester, England	
9	Win	7–2	(United Kingdom) Sherman Alleyne	PTS	6	2007-04-26	(United Kingdom) Midland Hotel, Manchester, England	
8	Win	6–2	(United Kingdom) George Katsimpas	PTS	8	2007-02-18	(United Kingdom) York Hall, Bethnal Green, London, England	
7	Loss	5–2	(United Kingdom) Danny Reynolds	PTS	6	2006-12-06	(United Kingdom) Light Waves Leisure Centre, Wakefield, England	
6	Win	5–1	(United Kingdom) Rocky Muscas	PTS	6	2006-11-23	(United Kingdom) Midland Hotel, Manchester, England	
5	Loss	4–1	(United Kingdom) Anthony Small	TKO	2 (6), 1:59	2006-10-21	(United Kingdom) Elephant & Castle Centre, Southwark, London, England	
4	Win	4–0	(United Kingdom) Martin Marshall	PTS	6	2006-09-11	(United Kingdom) Midland Hotel, Manchester, England	
3	Win	3–0	(United Kingdom) Geraint Harvey	PTS	6	2006-07-10	(United Kingdom) Midland Hotel, Manchester, England	
2	Win	2–0	(United Kingdom) Karl Taylor	PTS	6	2006-06-18	(United Kingdom) George Carnall Leisure Centre, Manchester, England	
1	Win	1–0	(United Kingdom) Tommy Jones	PTS	6	2006-04-28	(United Kingdom) Midland Hotel, Manchester, England	Professional debut
