= Ivan Kirpa =

Russian boxer

Personal information
- Nickname: The Terrible
- Nationality: (Russia) Russian
- Born: Ivan Kirpa; March 6, 1978 (age 48) Roslavl, Smolensk Oblast, Russian SFSR, Soviet Union
- Height: 5 ft 7 in (1.70 m)
- Weight: Welterweight

Boxing career
- Stance: Orthodox

Boxing record
- Total fights: 25
- Wins: 24
- Win by KO: 15
- Losses: 1
- Draws: 0
- No contests: 0

Ivan Kirpa (born March 6, 1978, in Roslavl, Russia) is a Russian welterweight boxer from Saint Petersburg, Russia.

He won his first 19 fights, before losing to Bradley Pryce on points on May 8, 2003. Kirpa then won his next four fights against Tigran Saribekyan, Alexei Korobka, Sergey Zimnevich and then Jose Leonardo Corona, 32 months after his last bout.
