= Kevin Kelly (boxer) =

Australian boxer (born 1969)

Personal information
- Nickname: Bones
- Nationality: Australian
- Born: 7 August 1969 (age 57) La Perouse, New South Wales
- Height: 5 ft 9 in (1.75 m)
- Weight: Welterweight (147 lb); Light middleweight (154 lb)/Middleweight (160 lb)

Boxing career
- Reach: 72 in (183 cm)
- Stance: Orthodox

Boxing record
- Total fights: 39
- Wins: 27 (KO 13)
- Losses: 8 (KO 1)
- Draws: 4

Kevin "Bones" Kelly (born 7 August 1969 in La Perouse, New South Wales) is an Australian retired professional welter/light middle/middleweight boxer of the 1990s and 2000s who won the South Australia State welterweight title, New South Wales (Australia) State welterweight title, New South Wales (Australia) State light middleweight title, Australian light middleweight title, Pan Asian Boxing Association (PABA) light middleweight title, World Boxing Union (WBU) middleweight title, and Commonwealth light middleweight title (twice), and was a challenger for the World Boxing Association (WBA) World light middleweight title against David Reid, and World Boxing Organization (WBO) Inter-Continental light middleweight title against Gary Lockett, his professional fighting weight varied from 142 lb (64 kg; 10 st 2 lb), i.e. welterweight to 158 1/4 lb (71.8 kg; 11 st 4.3 lb), i.e. middleweight.
