= Bradley Pryce =

Wales boxer

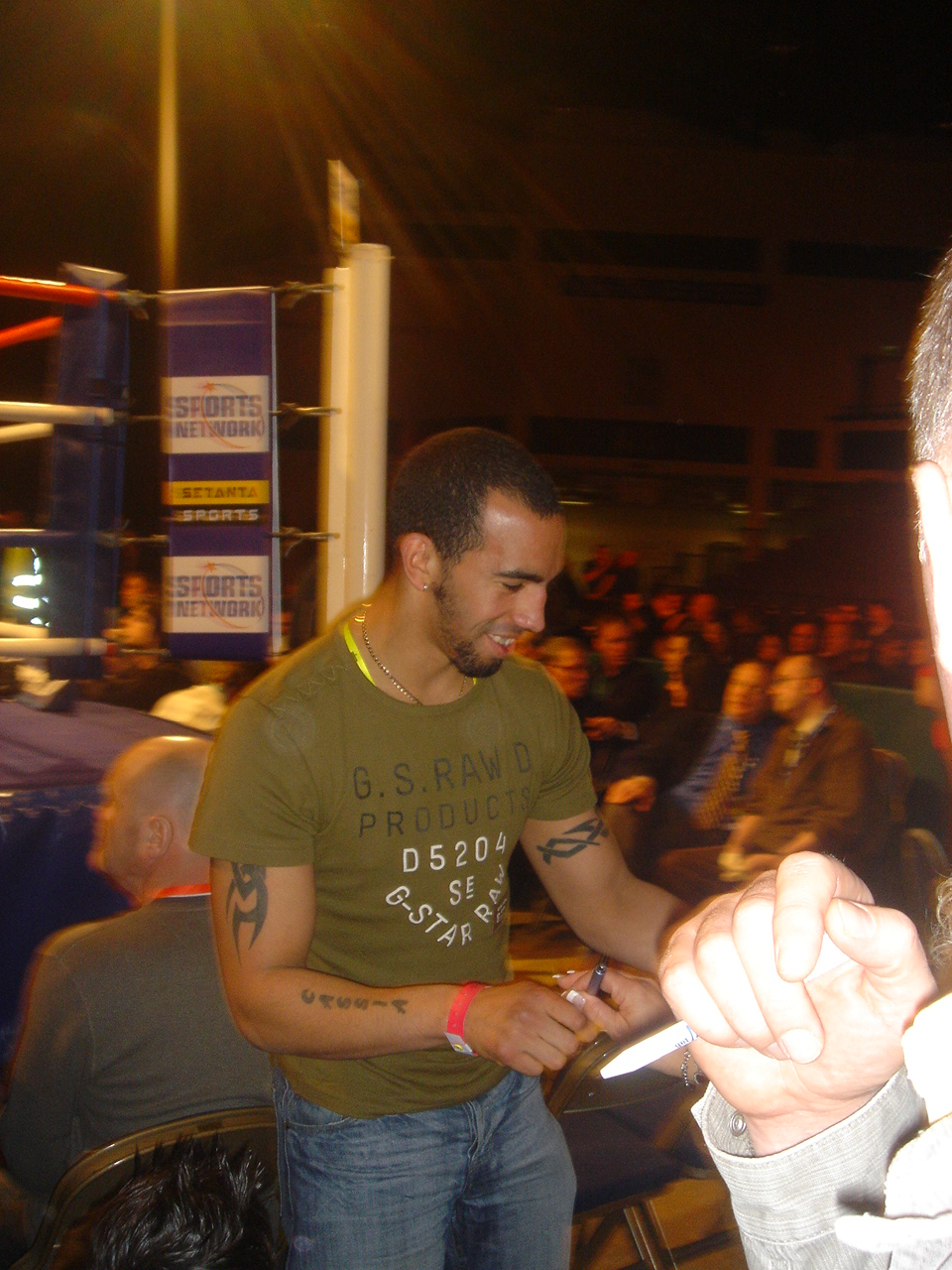
- Pryce in 2008

Personal information
- Nickname: Sweet Sugar
- Born: 15 March 1981 (age 45) Newport, Wales
- Weight: Light middleweight Middleweight

Boxing career
- Stance: Orthodox

Boxing record
- Total fights: 63
- Wins: 38
- Win by KO: 18
- Losses: 25

Bradley Pryce (born 15 March 1981) is a Welsh former professional boxer. At regional level, he held the Commonwealth light-middleweight title between 2006 and 2009; challenged twice for the British welterweight title twice in 2003 and 2005; and challenged once for the European light-middleweight title in 2013.

== Professional career ==
Pryce turned professional in July 2001 , winning his first fight at the Doncaster Dome, Doncaster, South Yorkshire, England beating David Hines on points over four rounds on a card which included Ricky Hatton, Junior Witter and Ryan Rhodes. His career advanced steadily over the next two years with a total of nine consecutive victories before being given the chance to fight for his first career title. The fight on 28 April 2001 saw him defeat Jason Hall at the International Arena in Cardiff for the WBO inter-continental lightweight title giving him a record of 11–0. One win against Stuart Patterson followed before his first defence of the title against South African Lucky Sambo on 9 October 2001, retaining via a 12-round decision.

=== Defeat and British title challenge ===
Three more wins followed the Sambo victory including a nine-round win over Chesterfield's Gavin Down, a man boasting a 22–1 record at the time. Pryce was soon to suffer his first defeat however, when on 17 August 2002 he lost a six-round contest to Ted Bami, a prospect at the time with a record of 8–1, at Cardiff Castle. A win over Craig Lynch on 23 November 2002 put him back on winning ways before challenging Neil Sinclair for the full British welterweight title on 1 February 2003. The fight, at the Odyssey Arena in Belfast, was to end in disappointment for Pryce as he lost his second professional contest and dropped to 17–2.

=== Difficult years ===
Pryce's response to the defeat to Sinclair was to take and defeat the unbeaten Ivan Kirpa (18–0) in Widnes on 8 May 2003. His next fight though was to result in a third career defeat, this time to Zimbabwean Farai Musiyiwa at Cardiff's National ice rink on 21 February 2004. Another defeat followed on 6 May 2004 to the unbeaten Thomas McDonagh at the Metrodome in Barnsley before defeating journeyman Keith Jones to win the Welsh Area title on 3 July 2004. He suffered further defeat in his next fight on 3 November 2004 when pitched against the unbeaten prospect Ajose Olusegun (13–0) which resulted in a fourth round stoppage. His final fight of the year on 11 December 2004 would ensure that a disastrous year would end on a high however with a win over unbeaten Russian fighter Sergey Stepkin (15–0) in London. Pryce finished 2004 with a record of two wins with three defeats and an overall record of 20–5. In 2005 he only fought once, losing again, this time to Michael Jennings on 25 October in a second attempt at the British title.

=== Commonwealth champion ===
On 11 March 2006 Pryce won his first major title. His opponent, Ossie Duran, had held the belt since beating Joshua Okine on 26 December 2003, in a reign that also included wins over Jamie Moore and Colin McNeil. The fight, at the Newport Leisure Centre, saw Pryce gain the title with a 12-round decision. He would go on to defend the belt twice more that year against Tanzania's Hassan Matumla and England's Andrew Facey. In 2007 he made further defences against Ghana's Thomas Awinbono and another English fighter in Martin Concepcion. In between those wins he also scored an impressive victory over then unbeaten Anthony Small, a man who would go on to win the title later in his career. Only one fight in 2008 saw him successfully defend for the sixth time against Marcus Portman. In 2009 however it went wrong, when on 14 March he lost the belt to Matthew Hall on the undercard of Amir Khan's fight with Marco Antonio Barrera losing via knockout in the second round.

=== Prizefighter and Comeback ===
Pryce returned to winning ways against journeyman Michael Monaghan at the Newport Leisure Centre on 21 August 2009 before taking part in the Prizefighter series on 26 February 2010. The contest, at the York Hall, pitched Pryce against former opponent Neil Sinclair in the first round with Pryce avenging his defeat then with a three-round points win now. In the semi-final he lost to the eventual winner of the tournament Prince Arron. On 9 July 2010 Pryce set his sights on a shot at the British welterweight title by scoring a win over former European champion Ted Bami, avenging a defeat by the same man earlier in his career. The fight lasted until just before the end of the 2nd round when a sharp left hook to the jaw of Bami proved the catalyst for a stoppage, Speaking of the win Pryce paid tribute to his new trainer, former pro Gary Lockett, saying "I was in danger of turning into a journeyman but Gary's going to get me back to title level" and adding "I'll take on any top welterweight in Britain. I'm full of confidence - that fight proves how hard I hit". On 6 November 2010 Pryce continued his march towards a title chance beating former Prizefighter champion Michael Lomax on points over the 8 round distance despite suffering a number of cuts to his eyes. Pryce suffered disappointment however on 12 February 2011 when he lost to the former British and European light welterweight champion Colin Lynes at the Olympia in Liverpool. The fight, very close at 78–77, was disappointing for Pryce as he had previously been in training for a shot at the British light middleweight title held by Sam Webb until that contest was called off.
