= Anthony Small =

English boxer

Personal information
- Nickname: Sugar Ray Clay Jones Jr.
- Nationality: British
- Born: Anthony Small; 20 June 1981 (age 45) London, England
- Weight: Light Middleweight

Boxing career
- Stance: unorthodox

Boxing record
- Total fights: 25
- Wins: 23
- Win by KO: 16
- Losses: 2
- Draws: 0
- No contests: 0

Anthony Small (also known as Abdul Haq) is a retired professional boxer and Islamic political activist who was born 20 June 1981 in Lewisham, London, England. He held both the British and Commonwealth belts at light middleweight. He was also referred to as 'Sugar Ray Clay Jones Jr.' (SRCJJ), in homage to Sugar Ray Robinson, Sugar Ray Leonard, Muhammad Ali, and Roy Jones Jr. Small converted to Sunni Islam at the age of 24. He is active on his YouTube blog where he advocates for Sharia (Islamic political ideology) to be implemented in Britain and is a follower of Anjem Choudary and a member of Al-Muhajiroun/Islam4UK.

== Boxing career ==
=== Early professional career ===
Small turned professional aged 23 in 2004 with a first-round knockout of Lance Hall. He was managed by boxing promoter Frank Warren, who had seen Small to wins over former Ukrainian Light Middleweight Champion Vladimir Borovski and previously unbeaten prospect Prince Arron. He also scored a win for the UK team in The Contender Challenge: UK vs. USA on 30 March 2007, defeating Walter Wright in the first matchup of the tournament by a close split decision. However, his World Title hopes were given a massive dent when he was beaten by a technical knockout in round seven by Bradley Pryce whilst fighting for the Commonwealth Light-Middleweight title.

Small's boxing style was considered to be unorthodox. He kept his gloves low, relying on body movement to avoid punches, rather than blocking. Due to his low hand position, he relied mainly on his natural hand speed to surprise his opponents when punching. Additionally, he shifted from the left-foot-forward orthodox stance to the right-foot-forward southpaw stance throughout the bout.

=== Route to contention ===
His first fight back following his defeat by Pryce was on 12 January 2008 for the Southern Area Title Light-Middleweight title when he defeated Mehrdud Takaloo by TKO after 7 rounds. On 14 June, he made his first defence, beating George Katsimpas by TKO in the 8th, flooring Katsimpas with a bodyshot. He finished a successful year by also defeating ex-contender star Freddy Curiel with a tenth round stoppage as well as former British title challenger Steve Conway.

=== British and Commonwealth champion ===
On 18 July 2009, Small fought for and won both the British and Commonwealth champion with an 8th round stoppage of Manchester's Matthew Hall after overwhelming him with a vicious flurry of hooks in the 8th, which forced the referee to stop the contest. He made his first defence of both titles on 27 November 2009 in a close decision win over Thomas McDonagh over 12 rounds. Small was criticised for his performance with many believing McDonagh had won. Small chose to give up the Commonwealth title and hold on to the British belt, defending it against mandatory challenger Sam Webb on 26 March 2010, who had also beaten McDonagh on points. The fight, which was also close, went the distance with Webb surviving a nasty cut in the fifth round to claim the judges decision on points handing a second career defeat to Small.

== Protest controversy ==
Small attracted controversy when he took part in a march in Barking, East London, to protest against the British presence in the war in Afghanistan. Small, a Salafi Muslim, had joined with around 50 other demonstrators who called themselves 'Muslims Against Crusades', which is a new front for al-Muhajiroun/Islam4UK, at the march on 15 June 2010.

In 2014, he was arrested after two other men were apprehended at Dover with false documents, and appeared in court at the Old Bailey on 15 June 2015 charged with planning to go to Syria to fight with Islamic State after spreading terrorist material online. He was found not guilty. In January 2018 Small was formally charged with "encouraging acts of terrorism" in a 2016 social media post following an investigation by the Metropolitan Police. He was acquitted in June.

== Other media appearances ==
In 2016, he appeared on the BBC Two documentary Muslims Like Us, in which ten Muslims of diverse beliefs were placed in a house together. His appearance was controversial for being potentially unrepresentative of the views of most Muslims in the UK, although reviewers noted that he was challenged vehemently on his views by the other housemates.

== Professional boxing record ==
| 25 fights | 23 wins | 2 losses |
|---|---|---|
| By knockout | 16 | 1 |
| By decision | 7 | 1 |
| Draws | 0 | |
| No contests | 0 | |

| No. | Result | Record | Opponent | Type | Round, time | Date | Location | Notes |
|---|---|---|---|---|---|---|---|---|
| 25 | Loss | 23–2 | (United Kingdom) Sam Webb | MD | 12 | 2010-03-26 | (United Kingdom) Goresbrook Leisure Centre, Dagenham, England | Lost BBBofC British Super welterweight title. |
| 24 | Win | 23–1 | (United Kingdom) Thomas McDonagh | UD | 12 | 2009-11-27 | (United Kingdom) Robin Park Centre, Wigan, England | Retained BBBofC British Super welterweight title. Retained Commonwealth (British Empire) Super welterweight title. |
| 23 | Win | 22–1 | (United Kingdom) Matthew Hall | TKO | 8 (12), 2:21 | 2009-07-18 | (United Kingdom) M.E.N. Arena, Manchester, England | Won vacant BBBofC British Super welterweight title. Won Commonwealth (British Empire) Super welterweight title. |
| 22 | Win | 21–1 | (United Kingdom) Steven Conway | TKO | 2 (8), 0:28 | 2008-12-06 | (United Kingdom) ExCeL Arena London, London Docklands, England | |
| 21 | Win | 20–1 | (United States) Freddy Curiel | TKO | 10 (12), 1:45 | 2008-09-12 | (United Kingdom) Grosvenor House Hotel, Mayfair, London, England | Won vacant WBA International Super welterweight title. |
| 20 | Win | 19–1 | (United Kingdom) George Katsimpas | TKO | 8 (10), 2:58 | 2008-06-14 | (United Kingdom) York Hall, Bethnal Green, London, England | Retained BBBofC Southern Area Super welterweight title. |
| 19 | Win | 18–1 | (Iran) Mehrdud Takaloo | TKO | 7 (10), 2:57 | 2008-01-12 | (United Kingdom) York Hall, Bethnal Green, London, England | Won vacant BBBofC Southern Area Super welterweight title. |
| 18 | Loss | 17–1 | (United Kingdom) Bradley Pryce | TKO | 7 (12), 2:14 | 2007-07-14 | (United Kingdom) The O2 Arena, Greenwich, London, England | For Commonwealth (British Empire) Super welterweight title. |
| 17 | Win | 17–0 | (United Kingdom) Walter Wright | SD | 8 | 2007-03-30 | (United Kingdom) Metro Radio Arena, Newcastle, England | |
| 16 | Win | 16–0 | (Russia) Sergey Starkov | TKO | 4 (8), 2:16 | 2007-02-17 | (United Kingdom) Wembley Arena, Wembley, London, England | |
| 15 | Win | 15–0 | (United Kingdom) Kevin Phelan | TKO | 1 (6) | 2006-12-09 | (United Kingdom) ExCeL Arena London, London Docklands, England | |
| 14 | Win | 14–0 | (Republic of Ireland) Ciaran Healy | TKO | 3 (8), 2:55 | 2006-11-18 | (United Kingdom) Newport Centre, Newport, Wales | |
| 13 | Win | 13–0 | (United Kingdom) Prince Arron | TKO | 2 (6), 1:59 | 2006-10-21 | (United Kingdom) Elephant & Castle Centre, Southwark, London, England | |
| 12 | Win | 12–0 | (Ukraine) Volodymyr Borovskyy | PTS | 6 | 2006-07-21 | (United Kingdom) Leisure Center, Altrincham, England | |
| 11 | Win | 11–0 | (Ukraine) Oleksandr Matviichuk | TKO | 6 (8), 2:10 | 2006-05-30 | (United Kingdom) York Hall, Bethnal Green, London, England | |
| 10 | Win | 10–0 | (Finland) Kai Kauramaki | KO | 3 (6), 0:29 | 2006-03-24 | (United Kingdom) York Hall, Bethnal Green, London, England | |
| 9 | Win | 9–0 | (United Kingdom) Ernie Smith | PTS | 6 | 2005-11-23 | (United Kingdom) London Hilton on Park Lane, Mayfair, London, England | |
| 8 | Win | 8–0 | (France) Ismael Kerzazi | TKO | 1 (6), 1:53 | 2005-10-14 | (United Kingdom) Leisure Center, Huddersfield, England | |
| 7 | Win | 7–0 | (France) David LeFranc | TKO | 1 (6), 2:11 | 2005-07-20 | Salle des Étoiles, Monte Carlo, Monaco | |
| 6 | Win | 6–0 | (United Kingdom) Howard Clarke | PTS | 6 | 2005-06-16 | (United Kingdom) Millennium Hotel, Mayfair, London, England | |
| 5 | Win | 5–0 | (Russia) Dmitry Donetsky | PTS | 4 | 2005-04-24 | (United Kingdom) Equinox Nightclub, Leicester, England | |
| 4 | Win | 4–0 | (Belarus) Andrei Sherel | TKO | 3 (4), 2:09 | 2005-01-21 | (United Kingdom) Fountain Leisure Centre, Brentwood, Essex, England | |
| 3 | Win | 3–0 | (United Kingdom) Howard Clarke | PTS | 4 | 2004-12-10 | (United Kingdom) Hillsborough Leisure Centre, Sheffield, England | |
| 2 | Win | 2–0 | (Angola) Emmanuel Marcos | TKO | 1 (4), 1:08 | 2004-09-10 | (United Kingdom) Wembley Arena, Wembley, London, England | |
| 1 | Win | 1–0 | (United Kingdom) Lance Hall | TKO | 1 (4), 2:28 | 2004-05-12 | (United Kingdom) Rivermead Leisure Centre, Reading, Berkshire, England | Professional debut |

| Preceded by Ryan Rhodes vacated | British Light Middleweight Champion; 18 July 2009 – 26 March 2010 | Succeeded by Sam Webb |
| Preceded by Matthew Hall | Commonwealth Light Middleweight Champion; 18 July 2009 – | Succeeded by Craig Watson |
