= Ensley Bingham =

English boxer (born 1961)

Ensley Bingham (born 1961) is a British former professional boxer from Manchester. He won the British championship on several occasions and the Inter-Continental light middle-weight championships.

Bingham challenged Winky Wright for the WBO light-middleweight title in November 1996, losing a wide unanimous decision.

Anthony Ivory, after being knocked clean out by Bingham in Manchester, stated, I`ve never been hit so hard in my life - a certain World Champ in the making.
