= Lloyd Hibbert =

English boxer

Personal information
- Nationality: English
- Born: Glenroy Lloyd Hibbert; 29 June 1959 (age 67) Birmingham, England
- Height: 5 ft 10 in (178 cm)
- Weight: light welter/welter/light middleweight

Boxing career

Boxing record
- Total fights: 23
- Wins: 19 (KO 2)
- Losses: 4 (KO 2)

Lloyd Hibbert (born 29 June 1959 in Birmingham) is an English professional light welter/welter/light middleweight boxer of the 1970s and '80s who won the British Boxing Board of Control (BBBofC) British light middleweight, and Commonwealth light middleweight title, and was a challenger for the BBBofC Midlands Area light middleweight title against Cliff Gilpin, his professional fighting weight varied from 139 lb (63 kg; 9 st 13 lb), i.e. light welterweight to 154 lb (70 kg; 11 st 0 lb), i.e. light middleweight.
