= Vanes Martirosyan =

Armenian-American boxer (1986–2025)

Vanes Martirosyan Վանես Մարտիրոսյան
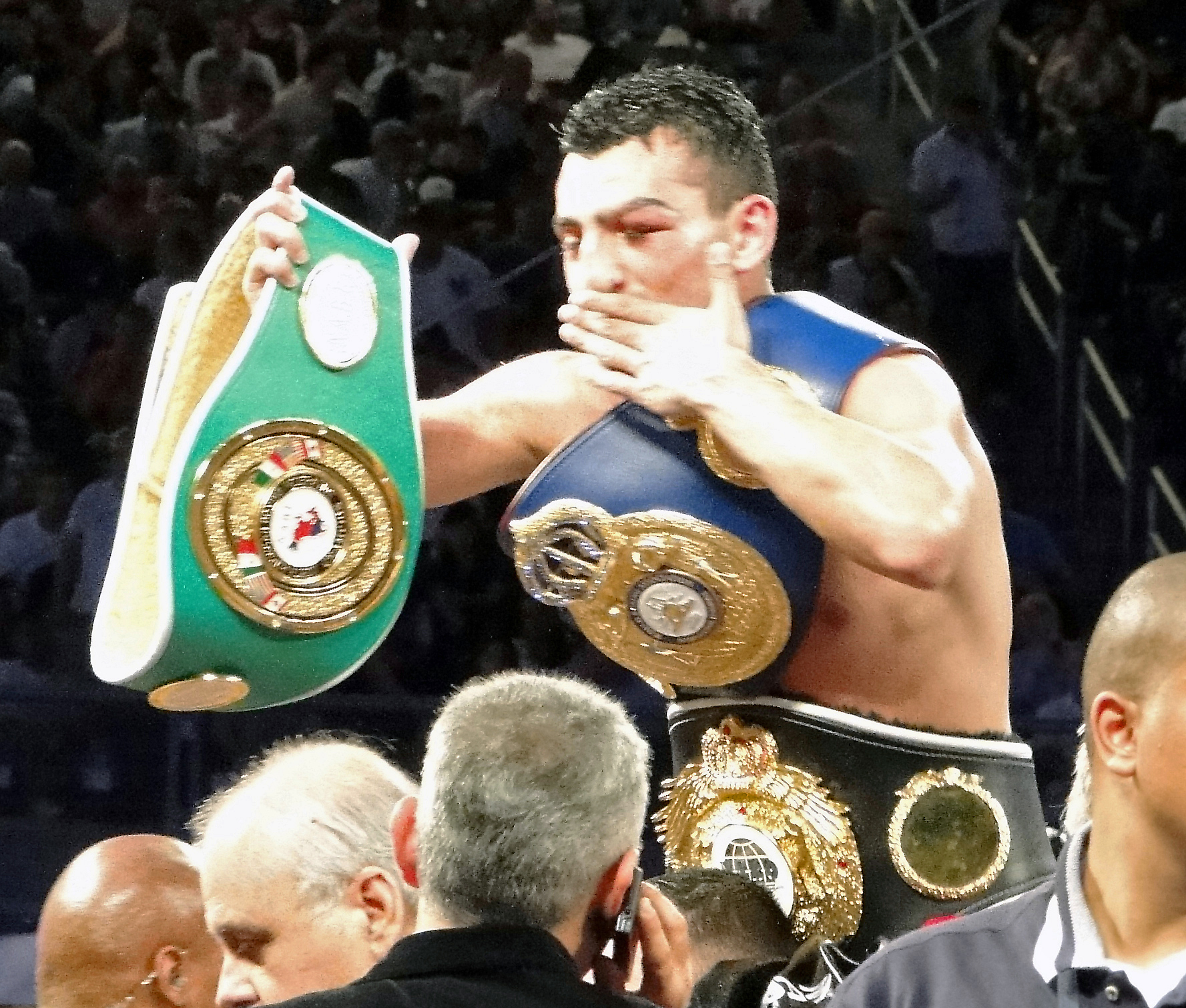
- Martirosyan celebrating his victory against Joe Greene, 2010

Personal information
- Nickname: The Nightmare
- Born: Vanes Norikovich Martirosyan; 1 May 1986 Abovyan, Armenian SSR, Soviet Union
- Died: 23 November 2025 (aged 39) Los Angeles, California, U.S.
- Height: 6 ft 0 in (183 cm)
- Weight: Light middleweight; Middleweight

Boxing career
- Reach: 70 in (178 cm)
- Stance: Orthodox

Boxing record
- Total fights: 41
- Wins: 36
- Win by KO: 21
- Losses: 4
- Draws: 1

Vanes Norikovich Martirosyan (/ˈvɑːnɛs/ Armenian: Վանես Մարտիրոսյան; 1 May 1986 – 23 November 2025) was an Armenian-born American professional boxer who competed from 2005 to 2018. He challenged twice for a light middleweight world title in 2013 and 2016, and once for unified middleweight world titles in 2018.

== Early life ==
Vanes was born on 1 May 1986, in Abovyan, Armenia. Vanes' father, Norik Martirosyan, was an amateur boxer in Armenia who worked for an industrial company and was also in the army. Vanes had two brothers, one older and one younger, and a sister.

His family moved to Glendale, California, when he was four years old. He started boxing when he was seven after his father found out there was a gym in Glendale.

Martirosyan was taken out of junior high school by his father and became home-schooled once it had become clear that he needed to keep his son's fighting confined to the ring.

== Amateur career ==
Martirosyan was an eight-time National Champion and a Golden Gloves Champion.

In 2004, after winning a match against Haiti's Andre Berto in the 1st AIBA American 2004 Olympic Qualifying Tournament in Tijuana, Mexico, Martirosyan secured a spot in the U.S. Olympic Team. He represented the United States at the 2004 Olympics as a Welterweight at age 18. He was on the same Olympic team as Andre Ward and Andre Dirrell.

Results were:

- Defeated Benamar Meskine (Algeria) 45–20
- Lost to Lorenzo Aragón Armenteros (Cuba) 11–20

Martitosyan lost in the second round to Aragon Armenteros who was 12 years his senior.

Notable boxers Martirosyan defeated as an amateur include Austin Trout (three times), Andre Berto, and Timothy Bradley.

He finished his amateur career with 120 wins and 10 losses.

== Professional career ==
=== Early career ===
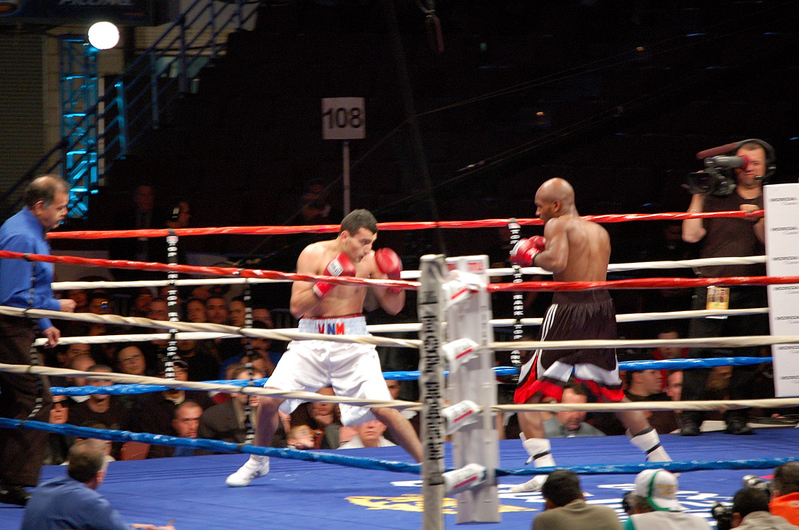
Martirosyan (left) vs. Taronze Washington, 2007

At the age of 20, Martirosyan turned professional at 154 pounds with Bob Arum's promotional company Top Rank. Vanes was managed by his uncle, Serge Martirosyan. He was also co-managed by Shelly Finkel, who also manages and advises or has managed and advised world champions such as Wladimir and Vitali Klitschko, Evander Holyfield, and Manny Pacquiao, among others.

Vanes was trained by Freddie Roach, who was voted 2003 and 2006 Trainer of the Year by the Boxing Writers Association of America. He trained alongside Roach's other top students, including Manny Pacquiao and Julio César Chávez, Jr.

Martirosyan also worked with Ronnie Shields, winning his first fight under Shields's tutelage when he knocked out Dan Wallace in one round.

Martirosyan subsequently scored a shutout unanimous decision over Clarence Taylor, and also recorded wins against Billy Lyell (who would later topple previously unbeaten John Duddy), Harrison Cuello, Andrey Tsurkan, and Willie Lee.

Martirosyan made lhis HBO debut on 5 June 2010, at Yankee Stadium on the Miguel Cotto vs. Yuri Foreman undercard. His opponent was fellow undefeated prospect Joe Greene (22–0, 14 KOs). Martirosyan handed Greene the first loss of his career by way of unanimous decision. With this win Martirosyan, advanced to 28–0 with 17 wins coming by way of knockout.

On 19 March 2011, Vanes made his next appearance in the ring at the Bell Centre in Montreal, Quebec. He got an easy win over Mexican Bladimir Hernandez by way of KO in the second round.

His next fight was against veteran Saúl Román in a WBC semi-final title eliminator for the vacant WBC Silver Light Middleweight Championship. The bout was on 4 June 2011, in HBO's televised portion of the Sebastian Zbik vs. Julio César Chávez Jr. undercard. Román knocked Vanes down in the first round and gave him trouble in the next two. Martirosyan came back in the fourth and fifth. When the seventh round began, Román cornered Vanes against the ropes and landed several blows. Vanes may have caught Román just in time from being stopped. In the same round, Vanes trapped Román against the ropes and knocked him down. After Román got up, Vanes landed a hard right hook on his chin and followed up with a barrage of blows while Román was leaning on the ropes, causing the fight to be stopped and turning what seemed to be a near defeat for Martirosyan into a victory for him.

On 29 October 2011, Vanes fought contender Richard Gutierrez. Vanes dominated from start to finish and won a ten-round unanimous decision. The judges' scorecards were 100–90, 100–90, and 99–91; with Vanes winning all but one round from one judge.

Martirosyan fought veteran Troy Lowry on the Julio César Chávez, Jr. vs. Marco Antonio Rubio undercard. Vanes knocked Lowry down in the first round and stopped him in the third to retain his WBC Silver title.

On 9 November 2013, Martirosyan was defeated in a split decision by Demetrius Andrade who on that day became a winner of the World Boxing Organization title.

On 21 March 2014, he appeared on ESPN's Goossen Tutor Promotions, defeating Mario Antonio Lozano via unanimous decision after 10 rounds in a fight for the vacant WBO Inter-Continental light middleweight title.

=== Martirosyan vs. Charlo ===
On 17 February 2015, Showtime announced that Martirosyan would appear on a doubleheader at the Palms Casino Resort in Las Vegas on March 28 against Jermell Charlo (25–0). The fight was contested over 10 rounds. Martirosyan lost a contentious unanimous decision. He was considered the more aggressive fighter. The scores were 97–93, 96–94, 96–94. Martirosyan felt he won the fight.

=== Martirosyan vs. Smith ===
On 12 September 2015, Martirosyan fought Ishe Smith. Martirosyan outpointed Smith on two of the judges scorecards, 97–91 and 97–91, while the third judge had the fight a draw, 95–95, giving Martirosyan the majority decision victory.

=== Martirosyan vs. Lara ===
In his next fight, Martirosyan fought Erislandy Lara for the WBA world super welterweight championship. Martirosyan got outboxed by Lara, and lost the fight via unanimous decision. The scorecards read 116–111, 116–111 and 115–112 in favour of Lara.

Following the loss to Lara, he signed a promotional deal with Don King, however this proved detrimental, as it kept him out of action for two years.

=== Martirosyan vs. Golovkin ===
On 5 May 2018, Martirosyan fought unified Middleweight champion Gennady Golovkin at the StubHub Center in Carson, California after he was chosen as the late replacement for Canelo Álvarez when Canelo withdrew from the much anticipated Cinco De Mayo rematch in the wake of his failed drug tests for Clenbuterol. With only three weeks of preparation for the bout and almost two years since his last professional fight, Martirosyan faced long odds against the undefeated middleweight champion. Although he performed better than expected in the opening round of the fight, Martirosyan eventually succumbed to Golovkin's power and suffered a quick defeat via knock out in the 2nd round. When speaking of Golovkin's power in the post-fight, Martirosyan said it felt like he was "being hit by a train." Golovkin said, "It feels great to get a knockout. Vanes is a very good fighter. He caught me a few times in the first round. In the second round, I came out all business after I felt him out in the first round." For the fight, Golovkin landed 36 of 84 punches thrown (43%) and Martirosyan landed 18 of his 73 thrown (25%). Martirosyan received a purse of $225,000 for the fight. The fight averaged 1,249,000 viewers and peaked at 1,361,000 viewers, making most-watched boxing match on cable television in 2018.

== Outside of boxing ==
After the loss to Golovkin, he went through a severe depression episode. In September 2019, Martirosyan was arrested for allegedly assaulting his wife after a verbal altercation. The incident involved Martirosyan reportedly grabbing his wife by the arm and headbutting her, resulting in visible injuries. She managed to escape and was found by police with a bruise and a broken nose; she declined medical assistance. Martirosyan was arrested the following morning and charged with felony domestic violence, later released on $50,000 bail. The pair reconciled and remained together until his death.

== Death & tribute ==
Martirosyan died on 23 November 2025, at the age of 39, following a two-year battle with skin cancer. His long time friend, Roma Kalantaryan, was with him during his final days. He said, “It's incredibly tragic to say that he’s not here with us anymore. He tried everything and even went to Mexico to get treatment, but it was really hard for him over the last six months. Vanes understood that he was running out of time the last time that I saw him."

Martirosyan is survived by his wife, Gaby Tsao, son Andrew, and daughter Arianna.

Middleweight boxer Sebastian Terteryan scored a knockout win in his professional debut against Dustin Spencer and dedicating the victory to Martirosyan. Terteryan recounted how Martirosyan had graciously responded to his request for advice. Despite not having met in person, Terteryan felt a deep connection to Martirosyan, who was a significant figure in the Armenian boxing community.

== Professional boxing record ==
41 fights	36 wins	4 losses
By knockout	21	1
By decision	15	3
Draws	1	

No.	Result	Record	Opponent	Type	Round, time	Date	Location	Notes
41	Loss	36–4–1	Gennady Golovkin	KO	2 (12), 1:53	May 5, 2018	StubHub Center, Carson, California, U.S.	For WBA (Super), WBC, and IBO middleweight titles
40	Loss	36–3–1	Erislandy Lara	UD	12	May 21, 2016	Cosmopolitan of Las Vegas, Paradise, Nevada, U.S.	For WBA and IBO light middleweight titles
39	Win	36–2–1	Ishe Smith	MD	10	Sep 12, 2015	MGM Grand Garden Arena, Paradise, Nevada, U.S.	
38	Loss	35–2–1	Jermell Charlo	UD	10	Mar 28, 2015	Pearl Concert Theater, Paradise, Nevada, U.S.	
37	Win	35–1–1	Willie Nelson	UD	10	Oct 4, 2014	Foxwoods Resort Casino, Ledyard, Connecticut, U.S.	Retained WBO Inter-Continental light middleweight title
36	Win	34–1–1	Mario Alberto Lozano	UD	10	Mar 21, 2014	Morongo Casino Resort & Spa, Cabazon, California, U.S.	Won vacant WBO Inter-Continental light middleweight title
35	Loss	33–1–1	Demetrius Andrade	SD	12	Nov 9, 2013	American Bank Center, Corpus Christi, Texas, U.S.	For vacant WBO light middleweight title
34	Win	33–0–1	Ryan Davis	TKO	2 (10), 2:01	Jun 15, 2013	American Airlines Center, Dallas, Texas, U.S.	
33	Draw	32–0–1	Erislandy Lara	TD	9 (12), 0:26	Nov 10, 2012	Wynn Las Vegas, Paradise, Nevada, U.S.	Split TD: Martirosyan cut from an accidental head clash
32	Win	32–0	Troy Lowry	TKO	3 (10), 2:53	Feb 4, 2012	Alamodome, San Antonio, Texas, U.S.	Retained WBC Silver light middleweight title
31	Win	31–0	Richard Gutierrez	UD	10	Oct 29, 2011	WinStar World Casino, Thackerville, Oklahoma, U.S.	
30	Win	30–0	Saúl Román	TKO	7 (12), 2:58	Jun 4, 2011	Staples Center, Los Angeles, California, U.S.	Won vacant WBC Silver light middleweight title
29	Win	29–0	Bladimir Hernandez	KO	2 (8), 0:57	Mar 19, 2011	Bell Centre, Montreal, Quebec, Canada	
28	Win	28–0	Joe Greene	UD	10	Jun 5, 2010	Yankee Stadium, New York City, U.S.	Retained NABF and NABO light middleweight titles; Won vacant WBA International light middleweight title
27	Win	27–0	Kassim Ouma	UD	10	Jan 16, 2010	The Joint, Paradise, Nevada, U.S.	Retained NABF and NABO light middleweight titles
26	Win	26–0	Willie Lee	TKO	3 (10), 2:13	Dec 19, 2009	Beeghly Center, Youngstown, Ohio, U.S.	Won NABF and vacant NABO light middleweight titles
25	Win	25–0	Andrey Tsurkan	RTD	6 (10), 3:00	Jun 27, 2009	Boardwalk Hall, Atlantic City, New Jersey, U.S.	
24	Win	24–0	Harrison Cuello	TKO	1 (8), 2:13	May 16, 2009	Star of the Desert Arena, Primm, Nevada, U.S.	
23	Win	23–0	Billy Lyell	UD	8	Feb 7, 2009	Honda Center, Anaheim, California, U.S.	
22	Win	22–0	Charles Howe	TKO	1 (10), 1:20	Nov 1, 2008	Mandalay Bay Events Center, Paradise, Nevada, U.S.	
21	Win	21–0	Michael Medina	UD	10	Sep 19, 2008	Star of the Desert Arena, Primm, Nevada, U.S.	
20	Win	20–0	Ángel Hernández	UD	10	Jun 26, 2008	The Orleans, Paradise, Nevada, U.S.	
19	Win	19–0	Michi Munoz	TKO	3 (10), 2:20	Feb 7, 2008	The Joint, Paradise, Nevada, U.S.	
18	Win	18–0	Clarence Taylor	UD	6	Jan 4, 2008	Alameda Swap Meet, Los Angeles, California, U.S.	
17	Win	17–0	Dan Wallace	TKO	1 (6), 1:34	Dec 20, 2007	The Joint, Paradise, Nevada, U.S.	
16	Win	16–0	Patrick Thompson	UD	6	Oct 4, 2007	The Joint, Paradise, Nevada, U.S.	
15	Win	15–0	Alexis Division	RTD	3 (8), 0:10	Aug 30, 2007	Grand Plaza Hotel, Houston, Texas, U.S.	
14	Win	14–0	Alberto Mercedes	TKO	7 (8), 1:17	Jun 29, 2007	Cliff Castle Casino Hotel, Camp Verde, Arizona, U.S.	
13	Win	13–0	Nelson Estupinan	TKO	2 (8), 2:59	Apr 27, 2007	Grand Plaza Hotel, Houston, Texas, U.S.	
12	Win	12–0	Taronze Washington	TKO	2 (8), 2:22	Jan 27, 2007	Honda Center, Anaheim, California, U.S.	
11	Win	11–0	Edgar Reyes	RTD	4 (6), 3:00	Nov 18, 2006	Thomas & Mack Center, Paradise, Nevada, U.S.	
10	Win	10–0	Marcus Brooks	UD	6	Aug 12, 2006	Thomas & Mack Center, Paradise, Nevada, U.S.	
9	Win	9–0	Oscar Gonzalez	TKO	1 (6), 2:14	Jun 3, 2006	Thomas & Mack Center, Paradise, Nevada, U.S.	
8	Win	8–0	Tefo Seetso	KO	3 (6), 0:55	Apr 8, 2006	Thomas & Mack Center, Paradise, Nevada, U.S.	
7	Win	7–0	Juan Pablo Montes de Oca	TKO	3 (6), 1:21	Feb 18, 2006	The Aladdin, Paradise, Nevada, U.S.	
6	Win	6–0	Abdias Castillo	TKO	5 (6), 1:45	Nov 12, 2005	Wynn Las Vegas, Paradise, Nevada, U.S.	
5	Win	5–0	Tony Morales	TKO	1 (6), 2:37	Oct 8, 2005	Thomas & Mack Center, Paradise, Nevada, U.S.	
4	Win	4–0	Gerardo Cesar Prieto	UD	6	Sep 10, 2005	Staples Center, Los Angeles, California, U.S.	
3	Win	3–0	Fernando Vela	UD	4	Aug 26, 2005	D&I Colonial Ballroom, Houston, Texas, U.S.	
2	Win	2–0	Jovanni Rubio	TKO	1 (4), 2:55	May 28, 2005	Staples Center, Los Angeles, California, U.S.	
1	Win	1–0	Jesse Orta	UD	4	Apr 8, 2005	Fort McDowell Casino, Fountain Hills, Arizona, U.S.	

== See also ==
- List of Armenian Americans

Sporting positions
Regional boxing titles
Preceded by Willie Lee	NABF light middleweight champion December 19, 2009 – March 2011; Vacated	Vacant Title next held by Grady Brewer
Vacant Title last held by Carlos Molina	NABO light middleweight champion December 19, 2009 – March 2011; Vacated	Vacant Title next held by Jonathan González
Vacant Title last held by Austin Trout	WBA International light middleweight champion June 5, 2010 – March 2011; Vacated	Vacant Title next held by Damian Jonak
Vacant Title last held by Canelo Álvarez	WBC Silver light middleweight champion June 4, 2011 – November 2012; Vacated	Vacant Title next held by Sergey Rabchenko
Vacant Title last held by Brian Rose	WBO Inter-Continental light middleweight champion March 21, 2014 – March 2015; Vacated	Vacant Title next held by Liam Smith
