= Chris Eubank Jr vs. Liam Smith =

Professional boxing matches

Unleashed
- Date: 21 January 2023
- Venue: Manchester Arena, Manchester, UK

Tale of the tape
| Boxer | (United Kingdom) Chris Eubank Jr | (United Kingdom) Liam Smith |
| Nickname | "Next Gen" | "Beefy" |
| Hometown | Hove, East Sussex | Liverpool, Merseyside |
| Pre-fight record | 32–2 (23 KOs) | 32–3–1 (19 KOs) |
| Age | 33 years, 4 months | 34 years, 5 months |
| Height | 5 ft 11 in (180 cm) | 5 ft 9 1/2 in (177 cm) |
| Weight | 159 lb (72 kg) | 159 lb (72 kg) |
| Style | Orthodox | Orthodox |
| Recognition | WBC/WBO; No. 2 Ranked Middleweight; WBA; No. 5 Ranked Middleweight | WBO; No. 2 Ranked Light Middleweight; WBC; No. 3 Ranked Light Middleweight; WBA; No. 4 Ranked Light Middleweight; IBF; No. 5 Ranked Light Middleweight |

Result
- Smith wins via 4th-round TKO

Chris Eubank Jr vs Liam Smith, billed as Unleashed, was a professional boxing match contested on 21 January 2023.

== Background ==
Prior to the fight with Benn being announced, a fight between Eubank and Smith was first discussed by Ben Shalom in June 2022. Shalom believed Eubank should be challenging for world titles. Eubank had one fight left on his contract with Boxxer and Sky Sports. On 1 July 2022, the opportunity to proceed with the fight became more feasible following Smith's signing of a multi-fight agreement with Boxxer and Sky Sports. Following the cancellation of Eubank's bout with Benn, Shalom announced that Smith would be positioned to face Eubank next. Additionally, Smith's potential opponents included Kell Brook, who was in the spotlight for another potential match after his victory over rival Amir Khan in February 2022, as well as the possibility of a world title fight. In November, negotiations began, targeting a fight for December.

On 24 November, the fight was made official to take place at the AO Arena in Manchester on 21 January 2023, with the event being broadcast live on Sky Sports Box Office in UK and DAZN in the United States. The highly anticipated fight was to be promoted by Boxxer, in partnership with Wasserman Boxing. Smith (32-3-1, 19 KOs) was entering the contest in outstanding form, having secured victories against notable opponents such as Jesse Vargas, Anthony Fowler, and Roberto Garcia. Eubank (32-2-0, 23 KOs) was enthusiastic about returning to the ring after his planned bout with Benn was postponed in October 2022. His last fight took place in February 2022, where he delivered a commanding performance against Liam Williams, winning by unanimous decision in Cardiff. Eubank entered the bout with a strong sense of confidence, firmly expecting to secure victory within eight rounds. Smith advocated for the weight limit to be set between 158 and 159 pounds. Aware that his request was unlikely to be accommodated, as it was well documented how Eubank struggled to make 157 pounds against Benn and the fact Smith was a naturally bigger man than Benn. There was a rematch clause in place. Smith was confident his experience would help him beat Eubank. He also expressed interest in a potential rematch in the future, as well as the option of moving back down in weight class.

In the lead-up to the fight, Chris Eubank made headlines by claiming he only needed to perform at 50% capacity to secure a victory against Smith. Smith dismissed Eubank’s remarks stating, “Chris is bang average but a good, fit athlete. If you need to be 50 percent… if he needs to be 50 percent to beat me, I may as well not show up.” Eubank also noted that he had only sparred for eight rounds, reasoning that he anticipated the match wouldn’t extend beyond that.

Tensions soared at the final press conference as the two boxers exchanged barbs. The confrontation escalated when Smith made a pointed remark, accusing Eubank of rarely being seen in the company of women, asking him, “Do you want to tell us something?” Eubank responded: “Listen, my private life is my private life,” Eubank Jr replied. “That's irrelevant to the boxing, but I’m happy, I'm comfortable.” After a brief period, broadcaster Andy Scott attempted to guide the conversation in a new direction. His attempt failed when Eubank accused Smith of cheating on his wife. He said, “If you want to get dark and personal with it, talking about being gay and do I like girls? I've been told by multiple sources that you cheat on your wife on occasion. “I’d rather be gay than a cheat.” Following the press conference, both boxers issued apologies for their remarks. Sky Sports also expressed regret, labelling the comments as homophobic. Reports indicated that the British Boxing Board of Control (BBBofC) may pursue misconduct charges against Smith in light of his statements. On 17 April 2023, the BBBofC ruled both individuals guilty of misconduct and imposed undisclosed fines on them.

Both boxers weighed the same 159 pounds. Eubank further taunted Smith by wearing a Manchester United jersey (Liverpool's rivals) and wore a rainbow armband. Overall, there was little drama to add at the weigh in following the final press conference. Eubank was a 3-1 favorite over Smith.

== The fight ==
In an unexpected turn of events, Smith scored a stunning fourth-round knockout against the favored Eubank. Eubank had been in control for the first three rounds but faced a dramatic shift in the fourth, where he was hurt and sent to the canvas twice. After the first knockdown, Eubank appeared unsteady, struggling to regain his footing. As the fight continued, Smith seized the opportunity, unleashing power shots that caught a dazed Eubank off guard, resulting in a second knockdown. It was at this point that the referee stepped in, stopping the contest. Even with the hostility leading up to the fight, Eubank congratulated Smith on the win. He said, “Big congratulations to him. I felt like I had him going but he caught me with a great shot. If the fans want to see a rematch, we can get it on at Anfield.” Smith expressed his willingness to have a rematch but emphasized that he wanted it to be under his conditions. Through the four rounds, Eubank landed 26 of 147 punches thrown (17.7%) and Smith landed 27 of his 113 thrown (23.9%).

== Aftermath ==
Eubank was later interviewed in his dressing room asked further about the fight and if he was hurt. He replied, "A tough night? No I wouldn't even say that, I was having fun, I was landing my shots, I was enjoying the moment. And he caught me with a once-in-a-lifetime shot. I got up, I recovered, he put it on me again with a few more shots and the referee decided it was enough. I felt like I could go on. I felt like I was aware of what was happening, but it was the referee's decision and I have to respect it. I felt like I was dominating the fight before that happened, so I think we've got an exciting opportunity, at some point in the future, to have that rematch. Listen, it's boxing, it's a sexy sport, this is the sport we love. Anything can happen. I never would have believed this could happen." He reaffirmed his respect for Smith.

Smith was contractually bound to a prompt rematch with Eubank. During his post-fight press conference, Smith outlined some of his "conditions" for the upcoming duel with Eubank. He said, “Just, obviously, like I said, Liverpool. Obviously, the money [changes] now. I might drag him down to 157 [pounds].” Kalle Sauerland, promoter for Eubank, acknowledged that he had no explanations for Smith's surprising knockout of Eubank. He explained the weight was not a factor and Eubank voluntarily weighed 159 pounds. The next steps were for the team to sit down and analyse if the rematch clause would be activated.

== Fight card ==
Confirmed bouts:

| Weight Class | | vs | | Method | Round | Time | Notes |
|---|---|---|---|---|---|---|---|
| Middleweight | (United Kingdom) Liam Smith | def. | (United Kingdom) Chris Eubank Jr | TKO | 4/12 | 1:09 |
| Cruiserweight | (United Kingdom) Richard Riakporhe | def. | (Poland) Krzysztof Głowacki | TKO | 4/12 | 2:44 |
| Welterweight | (United Kingdom) Ekow Essuman | def. | (United Kingdom) Chris Kongo | MD | 12 | | ^{Note 1} |
| Heavyweight | (New Zealand) Joseph Parker | def. | (United Kingdom) Jack Massey | UD | 10 |
| Heavyweight | (United Kingdom) Frazer Clarke | def. | (Argentina) Kevin Nicolas Espindola | RTD | 4/6 | 3:00 |
| Cruiserweight | (United Kingdom) Scott Forrest | def. | (Belgium) Amine Boucetta | PTS | 6 |
| Heavyweight | (United Kingdom) Matty Harris | def. | (Czech Republic) Jiri Surmaj | TKO | 1/6 | 1:14 |
| Lightweight | (United Kingdom) Frankie Stringer | def. | (Nicaragua) Cristian Narvaez | PTS | 4 |

^Note 1 For IBF European title

== Broadcasting ==
| Country | Broadcaster |
|---|---|
| United Kingdom | Sky Sports |

| Preceded by vs Liam Williams | Chris Eubank Jr's bouts 21 January 2023 | Succeeded by Rematch |
| Preceded by vs Hassan Mwakinyo | Liam Smith's bouts 21 January 2023 | Succeeded by Rematch |
