= Jaime Munguía vs. Liam Smith =

Boxing match

- Date: July 21, 2018
- Venue: The Joint, Paradise, Nevada, U.S.
- Title(s) on the line: WBO light middleweight title

Tale of the tape
Boxer	Jaime Munguía	Liam Smith
Nickname		Beefy
Hometown	Tijuana, Baja California, Mexico	Liverpool, Merseyside, UK
Purse	$200,000	$75,000
Pre-fight record	29–0 (25 KO)	26–1–1 (14 KO)
Age	21 years, 9 months	29 years, 11 months
Height	6 ft 0 in (183 cm)	5 ft 9 1/2 in (177 cm)
Weight	153 3/4 lb (70 kg)	152 3/4 lb (69 kg)
Style	Orthodox	Orthodox
Recognition	WBO; Light Middleweight Champion; The Ring; No. 4 Ranked Light middleweight	WBO; No. 1 Ranked Light Middleweight; The Ring; No. 6 Ranked Light middleweight Former Light middleweight Champion

Result
- Munguía def. Smith via 12-round unanimous decision (119–108, 117–110, 116–111)

Jaime Munguía vs. Liam Smith was a professional boxing match contested on July 21, 2018, for the WBO light middleweight title.

== Background ==
Former WBO light middleweight champion Liam Smith had become the WBO's mandatory challenger to their light middleweight champion after defeating Liam Williams in a title eliminator in November 2017. One month later, Sadam Ali upset the retiring Miguel Cotto to capture the WBO light middleweight title, and three months later in March 2018, it was announced that Ali and Smith would face each other that May at the Turning Stone Resort Casino in Verona, New York. Just weeks before the Ali–Smith fight was to take place, Smith was forced to withdraw from the bout after developing an undisclosed skin condition as a result of an allergic reaction. Undefeated 21-year old prospect Jaime Munguía then took Smith's place on short notice and dominated Ali en route to winning the WBO light middleweight title via fourth-round technical knockout.

With Smith retaining his spot at the WBO's number-one contender and having recovered from his ailment, negotiations began between Smith's promoter Frank Warren and Munguía's promoters Golden Boy Promotions soon after Munguía's title victory. One month later, the Munguía–Smith fight was finalized for July 21, 2018, at Nevada's The Joint within the Hard Rock Hotel and Casino.

Munguía was ranked as the 5th best Light middleweight by TBRB, with Smith ranked 10th.

== Fight Details ==
While Liam Smith fought well during the early rounds, Munguía adapted and controlled the fight from the fourth round on as he cruised to relatively lopsided unanimous decision, winning comfortably on all three of the judge's scorecards with scores of 119–108, 117–110 and 116–111.

Munguía scored the fight's lone knockdown after landing flush with a left hook to the side of Smith's head, who then stumbled to his knees. Munguía had the edge in overall punches, landing 277 out of 837 thrown punches compared to Smith's 198 of 702. Munguía also had a distinct edge in power punches, landing 239 to Smith's 158.

== Aftermath ==
Though Munguía admitted that he was hoping for a knockout victory, he nevertheless expressed satisfaction in going the full 12-round distance for the first time stating "Nothing is wrong with this. I am a little green, no doubt. But Smith has a lot of experience, and I had a tough opponent. But this is experience that will help me for the next rival."

== Fight card ==
Confirmed bouts:

Weight Class	Weight		vs.		Method	Round	Time	Notes
Light Middleweight	154 lb	Jaime Munguía (c)	def.	Liam Smith	UD	12		^{note 1}
Super Featherweight	130 lb	Alberto Machado (c)	def.	Rafael Mensah	UD	12		^{note 2}
Preliminary card
Middleweight	160 lb	Yamaguchi Falcão	def.	Elias Espadas	UD	10
Super Bantamweight	122 lb	Carlos Caraballo	def.	Jesus Martinez	RTD	5/8	3:00
Welterweight	147 lb	Blair Cobbs	def.	Emmanuel Valadez	TKO	2/6	1:52

^Note 1 For WBO light middleweight title
^Note 2 For WBA (Regular) super featherweight title

== Broadcasting ==
Country	Broadcaster
Latin America	Space
Panama	Cable Onda Sports
United Kingdom	BT Sport
United States	HBO

Preceded by vs. Sadam Ali	Jaime Munguía's bouts 21 July 2018	Succeeded by vs. Brandon Cook
Preceded by vs. Liam Williams II	Liam Smith's bouts 21 July 2018	Succeeded by vs. Sam Eggington
