= List of U.S. national Golden Gloves middleweight champions =

This is a list of United States national Golden Gloves champions in the middleweight division, along with the state or region they represented. The weight limit for middleweights was first contested at 160 lb (73 kg), but was increased to 165 lb (75 kg) in 1967.

- 1928 - Charles Benoit - Chicago
- 1929 - Johnny Ross - Chicago
- 1930 - Edward Steeve - Chicago
- 1931 - Fred Caserio - Chicago
- 1932 - Charles Neigo - Chicago
- 1933 - Fred Caserio - Chicago
- 1934 - Bill Treest - Chicago
- 1935 - Dave Clark - Detroit
- 1936 - Milton Shivers - Detroit
- 1937 - Al Wardlow - Dayton
- 1938 - Cornelius Young - Chicago
- 1939 - Ezzard Charles - Cincinnati
- 1940 - Joe Maxim - Cleveland
- 1941 - Charles Hayes - Detroit
- 1942 - Brenny McCombe - Grand Rapids
- 1943 - Samson Powell - Cleveland
- 1944 - Collins Brown - Chicago
- 1945 - John Garcia - Los Angeles
- 1946 - Stanley Shealey - Chicago
- 1947 - Nick Ranieri - Chicago
- 1948 - Alvin Williams - Oklahoma City
- 1949 - Joe Leudanski - Chicago
- 1950 - Junior Perry - St. Louis
- 1951 - Richard Guerrero - Chicago
- 1952 - Carl Blair - Great Lakes
- 1953 - Bill Late - Great Lakes
- 1954 - Paul Wright - Kansas City
- 1955 - Jesse Bowdry - St. Louis
- 1956 - Ed Cook - Montgomery
- 1957 - Leotis Martin - Toledo
- 1958 - Wilbert McClure - Toledo
- 1959 - Leotis Martin - Toledo
- 1960 - Leotis Martin - Toledo
- 1961 - James Ellis - Louisville
- 1962 - Gary Brown - Denver
- 1963 - Bill Dolugas - Columbus
- 1964 - Robert McMillan - Toledo
- 1965 - Al Jones- Detroit
- 1966 - Joseph Hopkins - Salt Lake City
- 1967 - Paul Badhorse - Los Angeles
- 1968 - Roy Dale - Cincinnati
- 1969 - Roosevelt Molden - Lowell
- 1970 - Larry Wood - Grand Rapids
- 1971 - Jerry Dobbs - Knoxville
- 1972 - Marvin Johnson - Indianapolis
- 1973 - Roy Hollis - Los Angeles
- 1974 - Vonzell Johnson - Columbus
- 1975 - Tom Sullivan - Las Vegas
- 1976 - Michael Spinks - St. Louis
- 1977 - Keith Broom - Knoxville
- 1978 - Wilford Scypion - Fort Worth
- 1979 - Tony Ayala, Jr. - Fort Worth
- 1980 - Lamont Kirkland - Omaha
- 1981 - Donald V. Lee - Fort Worth
- 1982 - Arthel Lawhorn - Detroit
- 1983 - Arthur Jimmerson - St. Louis
- 1984 - Virgil Hill - Minneapolis
- 1985 - William Guthrie - St Louis
- 1986 - Parker White - California
- 1987 - Fabian Williams - Grand Rapids
- 1988 - Keith Providence - Syracuse
- 1989 - Ray Lathon - St. Louis
- 1990 - Frank Vassar - Nevada
- 1991 - Frank Savanna - New Jersey
- 1992 - Anthony Steward - Chicago
- 1993 - Tarvis Simms - New England
- 1994 - Anulfo Vasquez J.r. - New Jersey
- 1995 - Jose Spearman - Cincinnati
- 1996 - Byron Mitchell - Milwaukee
- 1997 - Dana Rucker - Washington
- 1998 - Jerson Ravelo - New Jersey
- 1999 - Arthur Palac - Detroit
- 2000 - Carlo Pizarro - Massachusetts
- 2001 - Barry Pardue - Louisiana
- 2002 - Jaidon Codrington - New England
- 2003 - Kevin McLaurin - Colorado
- 2004 - Joe Greene - New York City
- 2005 - Daniel Jacobs - New York City
- 2006 - Edwin Rodriguez - New England
- 2007 - Shawn Porter - Cleveland
- 2008 - Denis Douglin - Morganville, NJ
- 2009 - Naim Terbunja - New York Metro
- 2010 - Ronald Ellis - New England
- 2011 - Jesse Hart - Pennsylvania
- 2012 - D'Mitrius Ballard - Maryland
- 2013 - Marquis Moore - Colorado
- 2014 - Marquis Moore - Colorado
- 2015 - Charles Conwell - Cleveland
- 2016 - Isiah Jones - Detroit
- 2017 - Poindexter Knight - Pennsylvania
- 2018 - Kiante Irving - Pennsylvania
- 2019 - Joseph Hicks - Michigan
- 2021 - Jordan Panthen - Hawaii
- 2022 - Donte Layne - New York (state)
- 2023 -Jose Rodriguez- Utah
