= Sadam Ali vs. Jaime Munguía =

- Date: May 12, 2018
- Venue: Turning Stone Resort Casino, Verona, New York, U.S.
- Title(s) on the line: WBO light middleweight title

Tale of the tape
Boxer	Sadam Ali	Jaime Munguía
Nickname	World Kid	
Hometown	Brooklyn, New York, U.S.	Tijuana, Baja California, Mexico
Pre-fight record	26–1 (14 KO)	28–0 (24 KO)
Age	29 years, 7 months	21 years, 7 months
Height	5 ft 8 in (173 cm)	6 ft 0 in (183 cm)
Weight	153 lb (69 kg)	152 3/4 lb (69 kg)
Style	Orthodox	Orthodox
Recognition	WBO; Light Middleweight Champion; The Ring; No. 4 Ranked Light middleweight	WBO; No. 4 Ranked Light Middleweight; WBC; No. 7 Ranked Light Middleweight

Result
- Munguía wins via 4th-round technical knockout

Sadam Ali vs. Jaime Munguía was a professional boxing match contested on May 12, 2018, for the WBO light middleweight title.

== Background ==
Sadam Ali had upset four-division champion Miguel Cotto to capture the WBO light middleweight title in what was Cotto's final fight on December 2, 2017. Three months later, it was announced that Ali would make his first defense against the WBO's mandatory challenger and former light middleweight title holder Liam Smith on May 12, 2018. However, Smith suffered an allergic reaction that resulted in him developing an undisclosed skin condition which halted his training for eight days and eventually led to him withdrawing from the bout just over two weeks before it was to take place. Just two days later, undefeated prospect Jaime Munguía was named Smith's replacement, having taken the Ali fight on short notice after negotiations to face middleweight champion Gennady Golovkin, also on short notice due to Golovkin's opponent Canelo Álvarez pulling out of their scheduled May 5th fight, fell through.

Ali was ranked as the 9th best Light middleweight by TBRB.

== Fight Details ==
Munguía would dominate Ali from the opening round, scoring the first of four knockdowns one minute into the first round with a combination to the body and head. Ali, though clearly hurt from the exchange, was able to answer the referee's 10-count and went on the defensive as Munguía continued his pursuit, eventually sending Ali down again just over a minute later with consecutive right hands. Ali again answered the referee's count and continued to try to avoid and clinch Munguía as he barely survived the round. Ali was able to rebound as the two fighters fought a close second round before Munguía was able to stun Ali with a big right hand in the final five seconds and send him down for a third time with a combination as the round ended. Though Ali would once again answer the referee's count, upon his return to his corner, the fight was nearly stopped before the ringside doctor ultimately allowed Ali to go back out for the third round. Ali had a solid third round, but Munguía again stunned Ali at the end of the round and seemingly scored his fourth knockdown of the fight, though the referee opted to rule it a slip. Though Ali seemed dazed as he returned to his corner after round three, the ringside doctor again cleared him to go out for the fourth. Munguía would press the action in the fourth before sending him down for the fourth time with a short left hook, after which the fight was stopped immediately. Munguía was named the winner by technical knockout at 1:02 of the fourth round.

== Fight card ==
Confirmed bouts:

Weight Class	Weight		vs.		Method	Round	Time	Notes
Light Middleweight	154 lbs.	Jaime Munguía	def.	Sadam Ali (c)	TKO	4/12	1:02	^{note 1}
Super Bantamweight	122 lbs.	Rey Vargas (c)	def.	Azat Hovhannisyan	UD	12		^{note 2}
Preliminary Card
Heavyweight	200+ lbs.	Alex Vanasse	def.	Ray Santiago	TKO	3/4	2:08
Light Welterweight	140 lbs.	George Rincon	def.	Corey Gulley	TKO	2/4	0:37
Featherweight	126 lbs.	Diuhl Olguin	def.	Kevin Rivers Jr	SD	6
Non-TV bouts
Heavyweight	200+ lbs.	Luis Vargas	def.	Damian Lewis	UD	4
Cruiserweight	200 lbs.	Lawrence Gabriel	def.	Brad Vargason	TKO	2/4	2:19

^Note 1 For WBO light middleweight title
^Note 2 For WBC super bantamweight title

== Broadcasting ==
Country/Region	Broadcaster
Latin America	Space
Mexico	Azteca
United States	HBO

Preceded by vs. Miguel Cotto	Sadam Ali's bouts 12 May 2018	Succeeded by vs. Mauricio Herrera
Preceded by vs. Johnny Navarrete	Jaime Munguía's bouts 12 May 2018	Succeeded by vs. Liam Smith
