= Liam Smith (boxer) =

English boxer (born 1988)

Personal information
- Nickname: Beefy
- Born: 27 July 1988 (age 38) Liverpool, England
- Height: 5 ft 9 1/2 in (177 cm)
- Weight: Light-middleweight; Middleweight

Boxing career
- Reach: 69 in (175 cm)
- Stance: Orthodox

Boxing record
- Total fights: 39
- Wins: 33
- Win by KO: 20
- Losses: 5
- Draws: 1

Liam Mark Smith (born 27 July 1988) is a British professional boxer. He held the World Boxing Organization (WBO) light-middleweight title from 2015 to 2016. At regional level, he has held multiple light-middleweight championships, including the British and Commonwealth titles between 2012 and 2015.

Smith is the younger brother of Paul Smith and Stephen Smith, and the older brother of Callum Smith; all of whom are professional boxers.

== Early life ==
Smith was born and raised in Liverpool, alongside his five siblings. Smith started boxing at Rotunda ABC during his teenage years and states boxing saved him from getting in trouble on the streets. He said: "I was doing other daft stuff, like getting brought home by police, smashing windows, fighting on the streets and other little silly things that lead up to going off the rails. But when I started boxing it would keep me in at night."

== Amateur career ==
As an amateur, Smith fought for Rotunda ABC in Liverpool. He is a two-time winner of the ABA Championships, having won in 2007 and 2008, fighting at light welterweight. In 2007 he defeated Luke Gray (of Stevenage ABC) and in 2008 he defeated Steve Turner (of the British Army).

== Professional career ==
=== Early career ===
Smith made his professional debut at light-middleweight on 10 October 2008 against Duncan Cottier at the Everton Park Sports Centre, Liverpool. In a four-round fight, Smith won on points as referee Steve Gray scored it (40–36). This was part of a stacked card by Queensberry Promotions which also had future world titlists such as Nathan Cleverly, Anthony Crolla, Tony Bellew as well as Smith's older brother Stephen. In his second pro fight, Smith defeated John Van Emmenis via first-round technical knockout (TKO). Smith only fought twice in 2009, outpointing Kevin McCauley and Darren Gethin in four round contests. Smith fought three times in 2010, first a 4-round points win over Billy Smith, a (38–38) points draw against Terry Carruthers and a second round TKO of veteran Matt Scriven. After a 9-month lay off, Smith fought twice again in 2011, a third-round knockout (KO) off Barrie Jones and a first-round KO of Gerard Healy. Healy dropped to one knee from a body shot and right uppercut and was counted out.

2012 was the most active year from Smith since his pro debut as he fought five times, an 8 rounds points win against Paul Morby, a first-round TKO win against Andrew Patterson, a six-round points win against Dee Mitchell and a 10-round points win against Gary McMillan, which was a British light-middleweight title eliminator. At the age of 24, this left Smith with a record of 12 wins, 5 by way of knockout, 1 draw and no losses.

=== British and Commonwealth champion ===
Smith had his last fight of 2015 on 15 December at the ExCel Arena in London, for the vacant Commonwealth light-middleweight title against Steve O'Meara (16–2, 5 KOs) in his first twelve-round fight. Smith knocked O'Meara down in round 1 and went on to win the fight on all three scorecards (118–110, 116–112 twice). After a 6-month gap, Smith returned to his hometown of Liverpool to defeat journeyman Max Maxwell on points over six rounds. Smith had his next tough fight on 21 September 2015, against Kenyan born Erick Ochieng (14–1, 4 KOs) at the Olympia. Smith won via twelve round unanimous decision on all scorecards (116–113, 117–112 twice) to win the vacant British light-middleweight title. In December, Smith successfully defended the title by stopping Mark Thompson (24–3, 15 KOs) in round 4. Thompson was down twice in the third round. In July 2014, Smith defended the title again, this time winning by way of knockout against Jason Welborn (15–2, 16 KOs) in round 6.

On 25 October 2014, Smith beat Zoltan Sera (16–2, 10 KOs) at the Echo Arena in Liverpool for the vacant WBA Continental light-middleweight title. Smith was cut above the right eye in a second round head clash which required 5 stitches, and Sera was knocked down in the third round as the fight came to an end. On 6 March 2015, Smith fought again at the Echo Arena, this time against Robert Talarek. Smith won via eighth-round TKO. A month later in April, Smith fought and defeated David Ezequiel Romero via seventh-round TKO to win the vacant WBO Inter-Continental light-middleweight title. Romero was knocked down once in the third round, twice in the fifth and once in the sixth before the fight came to an end. After the win, this left Smith with a record of 20 wins with 10 by knockout, 1 draw and no losses.

=== WBO junior middleweight champion ===
==== Smith vs. Thompson ====
It was announced in August 2015 that Smith would fight John Thompson (17–1, 6 KOs) for the WBO light-middleweight title, left vacant by Demetrius Andrade. Smith was initially supposed to fight Frenchman Michel Soro, only for an internal issue with promoters Top Rank to force him out. The fight took place on 10 October at the Manchester Arena, Manchester. Smith became the new WBO champion after seeing off Thompson with a seventh-round knockout. Smith slowly grew into the fight following a defensive first few rounds. By the time the sixth round came, Smith, was on the rise after a few well-placed jabs and produced the decisive punch in the seventh, causing the referee to wave the fight in his favour.

==== Smith vs. Kelly, Radosevic ====
On 19 December 2015, Smith returned to the Manchester Arena on the undercard of Andy Lee vs. Billy Joe Saunders WBO middleweight title fight. Smith dominated 'Jimmy' Kilrain Kelly (16–0, 7 KOs), making the first successful defense of his WBO title. Kelly was deducted two points in the sixth round for illegal head butting, and stopped late in the seventh round. Kelly produced a brave display against the more experienced champion. Despite Smith dominating the contest, Kelly showed his potential, troubling Smith on occasions in almost every round.

On 9 May 2016, Smith announced he would defend his WBO title against Predrag Radosevic (30–1, 11 KOs) at the Echo Arena on 4 June. This was Smith's second defence of his new title in his home city of Liverpool. This was announced after Austin Trout backed out. Smith won the fight in the second round to retain his world title. This was Smith's eighth consecutive knockout victory.

==== Smith vs. Álvarez ====
On 24 June 2016, it was announced that Smith would make the third defence of his world title against Mexican Canelo Álvarez (47–1–1, 33 KOs) on 17 September in the main event on an HBO PPV card. Golden Boy Promotions announced on 18 July that the bout will take place at the AT&T Stadium in Arlington, Texas. The other venue looking to host the fight was the MGM Grand in Las Vegas. The fight was contested at the official light-middleweight limit of 154 lbs and not 155 lbs, a weight in which Álvarez had fought his last 5 fights.

Smith lost his first fight as a professional when he was knocked down following a vicious left hook to the body in round 9. Smith, who lost his world title, was dropped once in round 7 and once in round 8. Álvarez was in control from the opening bell. The fight broke the boxing attendance record at the stadium, with an announcement of 51,240. Álvarez landed 157 punches from 422 thrown with a connect rate of 37%, compared to Smith 115 from 403 thrown, a connect rate of 29%. Golden Boy Promotions later announced the fight drew an estimated 300,000 ppv buys.

=== Road to world title challenge ===
In January 2017, negotiations began for a fight between Smith and 24 year old fellow Brit Liam Williams (16–0–1, 11 KOs), who were said to be long standing rivals, to take place on 8 April 2017. At an official press conference on 23 January, promoter Frank Warren announced the fight would take place at the Manchester Arena in Manchester on 8 April, as a co-feature with Terry Flanagan's WBO lightweight title defence against Petr Petrov. Early reports indicated it would be for the WBO world title, however Álvarez had not vacated. Instead Williams would be defending his WBO European title. Smith later said that fighting Williams, unless a world title is on the line, would be a backwards step for his career.

On 18 March 2017 Smith traveled to Spain and fought a four-round fight, winning on points. He defeated journeyman Marian Cazacu at the Club Entrena in Barcelona. This was under the radar as it was never mentioned prior to the fight.

==== Smith vs. Williams ====
Frank Warren successfully petitioned to the WBO to elevate the Smith vs. Williams fight to be for the WBO interim light-middleweight title. On 22 March, it was officially announced. This would also mean, should Álvarez vacate the title, the winner would become full title-holder, or if he decided to return to the 154lb division, he would be obliged to fight the winner. Smith failed to make weight, weighing in at 155.4 pounds. He was given the standard time to make weight later on, which he failed to do. Although the fight would still take place, should Smith win, the title would have remained vacant. It was the first time in eight years that Smith had failed to make weight. Smith failed to lift the vacant WBO interim title, but won the fight at the end of round 9 when Williams’ corner pulled him from the fight due to an eye injury, which was later revealed to be a double laceration on his right eyelid. At the time of stoppage, all three judges had Williams ahead on the scorecards. It was uncertain as to how the cut occurred, which many ringside observers believing it was clash of heads. Had the fight gone to scorecards, Williams would have claimed the vacant title. A rematch was talked about in the post fight.

==== Smith vs. Williams II ====
On 25 April, Frank Warren told Boxing News that he had spoken to both boxers and they agreed to wanting to fight again. He also went on to say it would likely take place in September. He said, "That gives them plenty of time to recover from the cuts and injuries from the first fight, they both need to be 100 percent for a rematch." There was no confirmation as to whether the WBO interim title would be at stake again. On 7 May, Warren tweeted that a deal had been agreed and the rematch would be an official WBO world title eliminator. Warren announced the fight would take place on 28 October 2017 in Manchester. Due to both boxers not willing to give away home advantage, Warren confirmed the fight would take in Newcastle at the Metro Radio Arena. Due to the announcement of Anthony Joshua's defence of his world titles against mandatory challenger Carlos Takam, Frank Warren pushed the fight back to take place on 11 November 2017. Smith weighed 154 pounds, whilst Williams came in lighter at 153 ½ pounds.

In what some considered a controversial decision, Smith defeated Williams after taking him the twelve round distance for the first time in his career. One judge scored the fight 114–114, whilst the remaining two judges scored the fight 117–111 and 116–112 in favour of Smith, giving him the majority decision. Smith started the fight slow and less aggressive than usual, making the first half of the fight close. Smith did well to cut the ring off when needed and utilised his jab. Williams seemed to land the harder shots, but had a lower output than Smith. With the win, Smith became the mandatory challenger to Miguel Cotto's WBO light middleweight title. Warren confirmed that regardless of Cotto's situation, whether he retires or vacates, Smith's next fight in 2018 would be for the WBO title. The next highest ranked contender at the time was Magomed Kurbonov. Smith said in the post-fight interviews, "It was a different fight this time – I think I showed a different Liam Smith. I think people were surprised how I boxed him. I've just beat a very good boxer in Liam Williams. Some people think I just walk forward, but I showed I've got a very good jab." The next day, Williams stated that he would like to fight Smith for a third time. He also said that, if Smith regains the WBO title, he had agreed to give him a title opportunity.

==== Smith vs. Munguía ====
On 2 December 2017, welterweight contender Sadam Ali defeated Miguel Cotto, winning the WBO light middleweight title in the process. Following the win, Ali stated he would stay at light-middleweight and defend the title. On 23 February, Smith's promoter Frank Warren stated that negotiations with Ali's promoters, Golden Boy Promotions, were going well and a deal would be done within weeks. There were reports suggesting the fight would take place on the Canelo Álvarez vs. Gennady Golovkin II card, however Warren made no mention of this. On 19 March 2018, the bout was confirmed to take place at the Turning Stone Resort Casino in Verona, New York on 12 May. On 27 April, Smith was forced to withdraw due to an allergic reaction. Smith stated he had been out of training for eight days and was forced to postpone the fight to a later date. Golden Boy were looking to keep the card and find a replacement. Mexican prospect Jaime Munguia (29–0, 25 KO's) replaced Smith, stopping Ali in round 4 and winning the WBO title.

On 21 May 2018, Frank Warren stated a deal was being put together for Mungiua to make his first title defence against Smith, possibly in the U.S. A month later, the fight was confirmed to take place on 21 July 2018, at The Joint at the Hard Rock Hotel & Casino in Las Vegas. For the fight, Mungiua was promised a purse of $200,000 and Smith would receive a $75,000 purse. In the fight, televised by HBO's Boxing After Dark, in front of a small crowd of 2,470, Smith took advantage of Munguia's defense at first, having success with his right hand. As the fight progressed, Munguia adapted and managed to land a clean left hook to the head, dropping Smith. Smith was hurt but managed to stay active throughout the rest of the bout, lasting the twelve round distance. After the knockdown, Munguia stayed in control. In round 9, Munguia landed 44 power shots compared to 22 shots landed by Smith. In rounds 9 through 12, Smith landed some good shots, however he lacked the punching power to keep Munguia at bay. Munguia landed heavy shots to the body and head in the final four rounds. Smith took the punches and kept firing back his own. Munguia won a unanimous decision with the scorecards reading 116–111, 119–108, 117–110, with boxing critics praising Smith for his toughness in a crowd-pleasing bout.

Smith complimented Munguia after the bout, stating: "Canelo hits harder at super welterweight. But he's young. He's 21 years of age. So he's a good fighter and he'll probably only get better and better." Munguia admitted he was looking for the knockout, but was happy to go the distance as it was a learning experience. According to CompuBox, Munguia landed 277 of 837 punches thrown (33%), which included 69 power shots to the body landed and Smith landed 198 of his 702 thrown (28%). The fight averaged 777,000 viewers and peaked at 827,000 viewers on HBO.

=== Regaining composure ===
==== Smith vs. Eggington ====
Smith stopped Sam Eggington in the fifth round of their fight at the Echo Arena in Liverpool on 30 March 2019 to win the vacant WBC Silver super-welterweight title.

==== Smith vs. Lozano ====
On 24 August 2019, Smith beat Mario Alberto Lozano (33–10, 24 KO) by seventh-round TKO on the undercard of the WBC super-flyweight title fight between Juan Francisco Estrada and Dewayne Beamon in Hermosillo, Sonora, Mexico.

==== Smith vs. Garcia ====
In his next fight, Smith fought Roberto Garcia. Smith repeatedly hurt Garcia with some good body work, for which he earned a wide unanimous decision victory on the scorecards, 99–91 twice and 98–92.

==== Smith vs. Kurbanov ====
In his next fight, Smith fought Magomed Kurbanov, ranked #5 by the WBO and WBA and #15 by the IBF at super welterweight, in Russia. Smith lost on all three judges scorecards, 113–115 twice and 112–117.

==== Smith vs. Fowler ====
On 9 October 2021, Smith fought fellow Liverpudlian, Anthony Fowler, winning via eighth round TKO.

==== Smith vs. Vargas ====
On 30 April 2022, Smith stopped Jessie Vargas in the 10th round at Madison Square Garden in New York to win the vacant WBO Intercontinental super-welterweight title.

==== Smith vs. Mwakinyo ====
Smith stopped Hassan Mwakinyo in the fourth round of their fight at the Echo Arena in Liverpool on 3 September 2022.

=== Middleweight ===
==== Smith vs. Eubank Jr ====
Smith fought former WBA interim middleweight champion Chris Eubank Jr at the Manchester Arena in Manchester, England on 21 January 2023. Smith defeated Eubank Jr. via TKO in the 4th round.

==== Smith vs. Eubank Jr II ====
A rematch between Eubank Jr. and Smith was originally scheduled for 17 June 2023 and rescheduled to 1 July at the Manchester Arena in Manchester, England. The bout was then rescheduled for a second time to 2 September, due to an injury to Smith. Smith lost after the referee stepped in to wave off the fight in the 10th round.

==== Smith vs. McKenna ====
After more than 18 months away from competitive action, Smith returned to face Aaron McKenna at Tottenham Hotspur Stadium in London on 26 April 2025, but lost by unanimous decision.

== Outside of boxing ==
On 30 September 2026, Smith was charged with causing grievous bodily harm with intent following an alleged assault on a night concierge at an apartment building in Manchester. Police stated that the alleged victim suffered serious facial injuries and reportedly required surgery. Smith appeared before Manchester Magistrates' Court on 14 September, where he was charged and released on bail pending a further hearing at Manchester Crown Court on 19 October 2026. He is set to enter a plea on 28 November, where it will be determined whether a court case will commence on 15 March 2028.

== Professional boxing record ==
| 39 fights | 33 wins | 5 losses |
|---|---|---|
| By knockout | 20 | 2 |
| By decision | 13 | 3 |
| Draws | 1 | |

| No. | Result | Record | Opponent | Type | Round, time | Date | Location | Notes |
|---|---|---|---|---|---|---|---|---|
| 39 | Loss | 33–5–1 | Aaron McKenna | UD | 12 | 26 Apr 2025 | Tottenham Hotspur Stadium, London, England | For vacant WBA International middleweight title |
| 38 | Loss | 33–4–1 | Chris Eubank Jr | TKO | 10 (12), 1:45 | 2 Sep 2023 | Manchester Arena, Manchester, England | |
| 37 | Win | 33–3–1 | Chris Eubank Jr | TKO | 4 (12), 1:09 | 21 Jan 2023 | Manchester Arena, Manchester, England | |
| 36 | Win | 32–3–1 | Hassan Mwakinyo | TKO | 4 (12), 1:46 | 3 Sep 2022 | Liverpool Arena, Liverpool, England | |
| 35 | Win | 31–3–1 | Jessie Vargas | TKO | 10 (12), 0:41 | 30 Apr 2022 | Madison Square Garden, New York City, New York, US | Won vacant WBO Inter-Continental light-middleweight title |
| 34 | Win | 30–3–1 | Anthony Fowler | TKO | 8 (12), 0:20 | 9 Oct 2021 | Liverpool Arena, Liverpool, England | Won WBA International light-middleweight title |
| 33 | Loss | 29–3–1 | Magomed Kurbanov | UD | 12 | 7 May 2021 | Yekaterinburg Sports Palace, Ekaterinburg, Russia | For vacant WBO International light-middleweight title |
| 32 | Win | 29–2–1 | Roberto García | UD | 10 | 20 Dec 2019 | Talking Stick Resort Arena, Phoenix, Arizona, US | |
| 31 | Win | 28–2–1 | Mario Alberto Lozano | TKO | 7 (10), 1:02 | 24 Aug 2019 | Centro de Usos Multiples, Hermosillo, Mexico | |
| 30 | Win | 27–2–1 | Sam Eggington | TKO | 5 (12), 2:00 | 30 Mar 2019 | Liverpool Arena, Liverpool, England | Won vacant WBC Silver light-middleweight title |
| 29 | Loss | 26–2–1 | Jaime Munguía | UD | 12 | 21 Jul 2018 | The Joint, Paradise, Nevada, US | For WBO light-middleweight title |
| 28 | Win | 26–1–1 | Liam Williams | MD | 12 | 11 Nov 2017 | Newcastle Arena, Newcastle, England | |
| 27 | Win | 25–1–1 | Liam Williams | RTD | 9 (12), 3:00 | 8 Apr 2017 | Manchester Arena, Manchester, England | |
| 26 | Win | 24–1–1 | Marian Cazacu | PTS | 4 | 18 Mar 2017 | Club de boxeo Entrena, Barcelona, Spain | |
| 25 | Loss | 23–1–1 | Canelo Álvarez | KO | 9 (12), 2:28 | 17 Sep 2016 | AT&T Stadium, Arlington, Texas, US | Lost WBO light-middleweight title |
| 24 | Win | 23–0–1 | Predrag Radošević | KO | 2 (12), 1:34 | 4 Jun 2016 | Liverpool Arena, Liverpool, England | Retained WBO light-middleweight title |
| 23 | Win | 22–0–1 | Jimmy Kelly | TKO | 7 (12), 2:35 | 19 Dec 2015 | Manchester Arena, Manchester, England | Retained WBO light-middleweight title |
| 22 | Win | 21–0–1 | John Thompson | TKO | 7 (12), 1:44 | 10 Oct 2015 | Manchester Arena, Manchester, England | Won vacant WBO light-middleweight title |
| 21 | Win | 20–0–1 | David Ezequiel Romero | TKO | 7 (10), 1:10 | 18 Apr 2015 | Liverpool Arena, Liverpool, England | Won vacant WBO Inter-Continental light-middleweight title |
| 20 | Win | 19–0–1 | Robert Talarek | TKO | 8 (10), 2:01 | 6 Mar 2015 | Liverpool Arena, Liverpool, England | |
| 19 | Win | 18–0–1 | Zoltan Sera | TKO | 3 (12), 1:53 | 25 Oct 2014 | Liverpool Arena, Liverpool, England | Won vacant WBA Continental (Europe) light-middleweight title |
| 18 | Win | 17–0–1 | Jason Welborn | KO | 6 (12), 0:36 | 26 Jul 2014 | Manchester Arena, Manchester, England | Retained British light-middleweight title |
| 17 | Win | 16–0–1 | Mark Thompson | TKO | 4 (12), 0:13 | 7 Dec 2013 | Liverpool Arena, Liverpool, England | Retained British light-middleweight title |
| 16 | Win | 15–0–1 | Erick Ochieng | UD | 12 | 21 Sep 2013 | Liverpool Olympia, Liverpool, England | Won vacant British light-middleweight title |
| 15 | Win | 14–0–1 | Max Maxwell | PTS | 6 | 28 Jun 2013 | Liverpool Olympia, Liverpool, England | |
| 14 | Win | 13–0–1 | Steve O'Meara | UD | 12 | 15 Dec 2012 | ExCeL, London, England | Won vacant Commonwealth light-middleweight title |
| 13 | Win | 12–0–1 | Gary McMillan | UD | 10 | 9 Nov 2012 | Liverpool Olympia, Liverpool, England | |
| 12 | Win | 11–0–1 | Dee Mitchell | PTS | 6 | 21 Sep 2012 | Hilton, London, England | |
| 11 | Win | 10–0–1 | Andrew Patterson | TKO | 1 (6), 2:48 | 25 May 2012 | Newport Centre, Newport, Wales | |
| 10 | Win | 9–0–1 | Paul Morby | PTS | 8 | 25 Feb 2012 | Cardiff International Arena, Cardiff, Wales | |
| 9 | Win | 8–0–1 | Gerard Healy | KO | 1 (6), 1:36 | 15 Oct 2011 | Liverpool Arena, Liverpool, England | |
| 8 | Win | 7–0–1 | Barrie Jones | KO | 3 (6), 2:12 | 17 Sep 2011 | Liverpool Olympia, Liverpool, England | |
| 7 | Win | 6–0–1 | Matt Scriven | TKO | 2 (4), 2:48 | 11 Dec 2010 | Liverpool Arena, Liverpool, England | |
| 6 | Draw | 5–0–1 | Terry Caruthers | PTS | 4 | 4 Sep 2010 | Kelvin Hall, Glasgow, Scotland | |
| 5 | Win | 5–0 | Billy Smith | PTS | 4 | 12 Mar 2010 | Liverpool Arena, Liverpool, England | |
| 4 | Win | 4–0 | Darren Gethin | PTS | 4 | 30 Oct 2009 | Liverpool Arena, Liverpool, England | |
| 3 | Win | 3–0 | Kevin McCauley | PTS | 4 | 14 Mar 2009 | Manchester Arena, Manchester, England | |
| 2 | Win | 2–0 | John Van Emmenis | TKO | 1 (4), 1:32 | 12 Dec 2008 | Kingsway Leisure Centre, Widnes, England | |
| 1 | Win | 1–0 | Duncan Cottier | PTS | 4 | 10 Oct 2008 | Everton Park Sports Centre, Liverpool, England | |

== Pay-per-view bouts ==
| No. | Date | Fight | Country | Network | Buys | Source(s) |
|---|---|---|---|---|---|---|
| 1 | 17 September 2016 | Canelo Álvarez vs. Liam Smith | United States | HBO | 300,000 | |
| 2 | 21 January 2023 | Chris Eubank Jr. vs. Liam Smith | United Kingdom, Ireland | Sky Sports Box Office | 200,000 | |
| 3 | 2 September 2023 | Chris Eubank Jr. vs. Liam Smith | United Kingdom, Ireland | Sky Sports Box Office | | |
| Total sales | | | | | 500,000 | |

Sporting positions
Regional boxing titles
| Vacant Title last held by Jamie Cox | Commonwealth light-middleweight champion 15 December 2012 – September 2013; Vacated | Vacant Title next held by Liam Williams |
| Vacant Title last held by Brian Rose | British light-middleweight champion 21 September 2013 – October 2015; Vacated | Vacant Title next held by Liam Williams |
| Vacant Title last held by Artem Karpets | WBA Continental (Europe) light-middleweight champion 25 October 2014 – April 2015; Vacated | Vacant Title next held by Shane Mosley |
| Vacant Title last held by Vanes Martirosyan | WBO Inter-Continental light-middleweight champion 18 April 2015 – May 2015; Vacated | Vacant Title next held by John Thompson |
| Vacant Title last held by Kell Brook | WBC Silver light-middleweight champion 30 March 2019 – 11 January 2020; Stripped | Vacant Title next held by Erickson Lubin |
World boxing titles
| Vacant Title last held by Demetrius Andrade | WBO light-middleweight champion 10 October 2015 – 17 September 2016 | Succeeded by Canelo Álvarez |
