= Demetrius Andrade =

American boxer (born 1988)

Personal information
- Nickname: Boo Boo
- Born: Demetrius Cesar Andrade; February 26, 1988 (age 38) Providence, Rhode Island, U.S.
- Height: 6 ft 1 in (185 cm)
- Weight: Light middleweight; Middleweight; Super middleweight

Boxing career
- Reach: 73 1/2 in (187 cm)
- Stance: Southpaw

Boxing record
- Total fights: 34
- Wins: 33
- Win by KO: 20
- Losses: 1
Medal record
Men's amateur boxing
Representing United States
Pan American Games
Silver medal – second place	Rio 2007	Welterweight
World Championships
Gold medal – first place	Chicago 2007	Welterweight

Demetrius Cesar Andrade (/ˈændreɪd/ AND-rayd; born February 26, 1988) is an American professional boxer. He has held multiple world championships in two weight classes, at light middleweight and middleweight. As an amateur, he won the U.S. national championships and Golden Gloves twice each, a gold medal at the 2007 World Championships, and represented the U.S. at the 2008 Olympics; all in the welterweight division.

== Early life ==
Andrade was introduced to boxing at the early age of four after regularly visiting his father Paul's gym. There, he observed his father training his older brother. At the age of six, Andrade's boxing journey began when his father started training him. He earned the nickname "Boo Boo" due to his risk-taking and daredevil nature. He regularly hurt himself jumping off roofs, climbing trees, and engaging in other adventurous activities.

Besides boxing, he played football but credited boxing with helping him build self-reliance and character, as it is an individual sport rather than one that depends on others in a team.

== Amateur career ==
Demetrius Andrade obtained arguably the most successful amateur boxing reputation amongst all Rhode Island fighters in history. A Providence native of Cape Verdean descent, southpaw Andrade began boxing in 1994 at the age of 6. His nickname "Boo Boo" quickly became well known amongst the locals and he later became a recognized name across the United States.

Andrade won the United States Amateur Boxing Championship in 2005, and repeated it in 2006 when he also won the National Golden Gloves. He again won the National Golden Gloves in 2007, but did not compete in the U.S. Amateurs that year due to injury.

Andrade initially struggled at the international level, losing to Eastern Europe opponents at the World Cup in 2005 and 2006. However, he won the silver medal at the 2007 Pan American Games in Rio de Janeiro, losing in the gold medal match to Brazilian hometown favorite Pedro Lima by a narrow 7-6 margin.

He won gold at the 2007 World Amateur Boxing Championships, where he beat Kakhaber Zhvania, Dmitrijs Sostaks, 2005 silver medalist Magomed Nurutdinov, future champion Jack Culcay-Keth, and Adem Kılıççı in the semifinal round. He beat Non Boonjumnong of Thailand in the finals, a match in which Andrade inflicted a standing eight count upon Boonjumnong and was leading by a score of 11-3 in the second round when Boonjumnong retired with an injury to his right arm.

Andrade attempted one last amateur endeavor before deciding to become professional. At the Olympic trials he defeated hard-punching Keith Thurman 27:13 In 2008, Demetrius Andrade was honored with the satisfaction of representing the USA in the 2008 Beijing Olympics and he became known as one of the favorites to win a gold medal. He overcame Kakhaber Zhvania and the highly regarded Russian Andrey Balanov 14:3 to advance to the quarterfinals but he was shocked by Korean veteran Kim Jung-Joo 9:11 (Olympic results) in a controversial loss. Though unable to win an Olympic Gold Medal that year, Andrade decided to end his exceptional amateur campaign and become a professional.

== Professional career ==
=== Light middleweight ===
==== Early career ====
Demetrius Andrade became a professional boxer and had his first pro fight in October 2008.

He defeated Patrick Cape at Northern Quest Casino, Airway Heights, Washington in a second-round knockout. He went on to win a TKO over Eric Marriott before making his Friday Night Fights debut against Tom Joseph on March 6 with a 1st-round TKO victory. Only 2 weeks later, Demetrius beat Arnulfo Javier Romero in a second-round KO. On June 19, 2009 he won in a unanimous decision against Tony Hirsch and followed up with another KO against Chad Greenleaf in the second round.

Andrade went on to defeat John Williams by TKO in the 6th round, and Chris Chatman by unanimous decision. Andrade's record jumped to an impressive 9–0 record after demolishing Italian boxer Bernardo Guereca, with a 1st-round KO. Demetrius defeated his next ten opponents, including five fights ending by KO and the others ending by unanimous decision.

==== Andrade vs. Martirosyan ====
An opportunity arose in the Summer of 2013 when the vacant WBO light middleweight title would be decided by one match between Andrade and Armenian contender Vanes Martirosyan (33–0–1, 21 KOs). Andrade was scheduled to fight titlist Zaurbek Baysangurov on July 6 in Kyiv, Ukraine. Baysangurov was stripped after suffering a back injury and being sidelined for an extended period of time. The fight took place on November 9, 2013, at the American Bank Center in Texas. The fight was originally scheduled to take place on September 7 at the Staples Center in Los Angeles. Andrade defeated Martirosyan via split decision with scores of 114–113, 117–110 and 112–115 to win the vacant WBO title. Andrade was knocked down in the first round from a left hook by Martirosyan after dominating the entire round. Andrade used his jab and quickness to control the majority of the fight.

==== Andrade vs. Rose ====
On March 20, 2014 it was confirmed that British boxer and mandatory challenger Brian Rose (25–1–1, 7 KO) would be the first defence of Andrade's world title reign. The fight would take place on June 14 at the Barclays Center in Brooklyn. Andrade dominated Rose, a British native via 7th-round TKO. Andrade was ahead on all scorecards (60–51 & 60–52 twice) at the time of stoppage. Rose was dropped hard by straight left hand from Andrade in the first round. In round 3, Andrade connected with a counter right hook, which put Rose on the canvas a second time. Referee Michael Griffin stepped in to put an end to the one-sided beatdown in round 7. Compubox showed Andrade landed 149 of 452 total punches (33%), while Rose connected on a minor 30 of 179 total punches (17%). The fight advanced Andrade to an outstanding 21–0 with 14 knockouts. Andrade put in a dominant performance to claim his place as a top champion in order to lure a future fight with the division best including Canelo Álvarez and Floyd Mayweather. For the fight, Andrade earned $200,000 compared to Rose, who earned a $100,000 purse. The fight averaged 882,000 viewers on HBO.

==== Andrade vs. Charlo negotiations ====
Andrade was scheduled to fight Jermell Charlo (24–0, 11 KOs) at Mandalay Bay Resort & Casino on December 13, 2014, defending his WBO title. On November 16 was cancelled due to purse issues. Andrade was reportedly offered $250,000, but later increased to what would be a career high $300,000 purse. In January 2015, Banner Promotions stated the fight was back on and likely to take place in the Spring of 2015. The following month, Star Boxing and Banner Promotions announced a deal was being worked out, however, Andrade would ultimately pull out. In August 2015, Andrade sued entertainment agency Roc Nation alleging they had persuaded him to reject a $550K offer to face Charlo along with a three-fight deal with Showtime in exchange for a separate deal that did not materialize.

==== Inactivity and comeback ====
After 13 months with no title defenses and none scheduled, Andrade was stripped of the title by the World Boxing Organization Committee. On September 11, 2014, it was announced that the WBO had granted a request by Andrade's promoter to have him to challenge for the vacant WBO middleweight title against Matt Korobov. Andrade's father and trainer, Paul Andrade, stated "I would like to thank the WBO for having faith in us and giving us the opportunity,". However, less than a month later, it was announced that Andrade had elected to pull out of the fight and continue campaigning at the junior middleweight division.

On September 16, 2015 Banner Promotions and Star Boxing announced that Andrade would return to the ring after 16 months of inactivity against 28 year old Argentine boxer Dario Fabian Pucheta (20-2, 11 KOs) for the vacant WBA International light middleweight title at the Mohegan Sun Casino in Uncasville, Connecticut on October 17. In a statement, Andrade said, "It's about time that I get back in the ring. I am happy to be fighting [near] home in front of my fans." Andrade headlined the card. Andrade won the vacant regional title by knocking out Pucheta in the second round. Andrade started strong dropping Pucheta in round 1 following a straight left. Pucheta was dropped again in the opening round when Andrade landed a right uppercut. Another right hand in round 2 ended the bout.

==== Andrade vs. Nelson ====
ESPN reported that Andrade would take part in a Showtime-televised tripleheader in a WBC light middleweight final eliminator against 28 year old contender Willie Nelson (25–2–1, 15 KOs) on June 11, 2016 at the Turning Stone Resort & Casino in Verona, New York. Andrade defeated Nelson via a 12th round stoppage. The win put Andrade in line for a WBC title shot against then-newly crowned champion Jermell Charlo. Andrade knocked Nelson down four times throughout the fight before it finally came to an end. The final knockdown occurred in round 12 following a right hand. Referee Dick Pakozdi then stopped the fight at 1:38 of the round. The other knockdowns appeared in round 1, 11 and 12, before the final knockdown. With Nelson looking hesitant to throw punches, it allowed Andrade to work over and continiusly land at will. Following the fight, Andrade said, "I'm coming to get those belts.People can't run no more. The best have to fight the best. I'm coming for them. I came back, I'm stronger. Me and my team worked hard. We figured out what we need to do to take it to the next level. I'm ready for the Charlo brothers. I want them."

Andrade, although he was mandatory for Jermell Charlo's WBC title, made it known that he was also targeting a fight with long-time WBA 'super' champion Erislany Lara (23–2–2, 13 KOs), who was also regarded one of the best at 154 pounds. Andrade's promoter Artie Pellulo told ESPN, "I'm going to ask Stephen (Espinoza) if he is interested in doing a fight between Demetrius and Lara." However, Andrade later stated he'd only face Lara as a "last resort", preferring to face Jack Culcay for a lesser title with the goal of securing a fight with Jermell Charlo in the future; “He [Lara] won't engage or try and make the fight entertaining, especially if it's coming into my favor,” Andrade explained. “He's just going to survive, try to run, try to do the little pitty-pat counter punches."

==== Andrade vs. Culcay ====
Andrade agreed terms to fight Jack Culcay (22–1, 11 KOs) for the WBA 'Regular' light middleweight title at the MBS Arena in Potsdam, Brandenburg on November 5, 2016. Sauerland Event won the purse bid for the fight at $425,144, 25% of which will go to Andrade. Showtime confirmed they would not be broadcasting the fight, despite interest in Andrade, due to them not wanting to go head to head with Manny Pacquiao's return on that same date. Andrade defeated Culcay in the amateurs on the way to winning gold at the 2007 World Championships. The fight was cancelled after it was revealed Andrade's camp had failed to meet several deadlines the WBA had set for the official contracts to be signed. The contract was eventually signed, however as they have failed to meet the deadlines given by the WBA and Team Sauerland, the fight remained cancelled.

On January 14, 2017 reports suggested that a contract had been signed between Andrade and Culcay to fight for the WBA 'Regular' title on March 11. The fight was officially confirmed weeks later to take place at the Friedrich-Ebert-Halle in Ludwigshafen, Germany. Andrade became a two time world champion after winning the WBA 'Regular' title via split decision. Two judges scored the bout 116–112 for Andrade whilst the third had it 115–114 for Culcay. The fight was regarded as close, with as many as five rounds being tossed between the two. Sky Sports pundits had Andrade a clear close winner as he outworked Culcay. In the post fight interview, Andrade credited his performance, "I thought I did everything that I needed to do. I came to Germany and took the title. Culcay came like a champion, but I was the better man. I outlanded him and I came out with the victory." He also stated that he was happy to be back in the world title mix and defend against the best 154 pound fighters.

=== Middleweight ===
==== Andrade vs. Fox ====
On September 14, 2017 it was announced that Andrade would appear on a HBO card, as part of his new multi-fight deal on October 21 as a co-feature to Jezreel Corrales vs. Alberto Machado at the Turning Stone in Verona, New York. His opponent was revealed to be Alantez Fox (23–0–1, 11 KOs), who would be taking a significant step up in competition. It was also revealed the fight would be a non-title fight at middleweight. Fox, a natural middleweight, has been fighting at the weight since 2012. On fight night, Andrade put in a solid performance, winning the fight after 12 rounds via unanimous decision. The three judges' scored the fight 118–110, 118–109, and 116–111 in his favour. Andrade hurt Fox in the opening round and looked as though he would be able finish the fight inside the distance. Instead, Fox went to defense mode and made Andrade work for the decision. In round 7, Andrade slipped during an exchange with Fox. When Andrade got back to his feet, he was shocked to see the referee counting, ruling the slip as an official knockdown. Replays showed that Fox did not land a punch in the exchange. Andrade continued to use his jab and left hand to control the fight. ComputBox stats showed that through the 12 rounds, Fox 52 of 301 punches thrown (17%). Andrade, who was the clear winner after 12 rounds, landed 158 of his 572 thrown (27%), which included 49% of his power punches landed.

Andrade felt he did well in his debut at middleweight and believed there was always room for improvement. He said, "I did everything I needed to do. It was a great experience to go 12 rounds at this weight. Fox is a tough kid, and after I hurt him early in the first round, he recovered well. He wasn't sloppy and he knew how to survive, so that is why I did not finish him." It was revealed that Andrade vacated his WBA 'Regular' light middleweight title before the fight, in order to get ranked immediately at middleweight, which would eventually earn him a title opportunity. The fight drew an average of 613,000 viewers and peaked at 685,000 viewers on HBO.

==== Promotional changes ====
On June 20, 2018 it was reported by ESPN's Dan Rafael that HBO would air Andrade against 2012 Olympic bronze medalist Yamaguchi Falcão (15-0, 7 KOs) on the undercard of Jaime Munguía's WBO light middleweight title defence against Liam Smith on July 21 at the Hard Rock Hotel & Casino in Las Vegas. The fight was confirmed on June 26, however a day later, Andrade announced that he had split with Star Boxing & Banner Promotions, who had both co-promoted Andrade for 10 years. It was a mutual decision from all parties. Andrade said, “It's been a long journey. I've learned a lot and I really appreciate everything that Artie (Pelullo of Banner Promotions) and Joe (DeGuardia of Star Boxing) did for me and my career. Sometimes it seemed like it was us against the whole world trying to get the top fighters to get in the ring with me but at the end of the day Artie and Joe guided me to two World Championships and I really want to thank them for all their efforts! I'm hoping to be back in the ring again very soon and get an opportunity to show the world that I'm going to be a World Champion once again!" Andrade declared himself a promotional free agent. According to The Ring, Andrade bought out the remainder of his contract. The fight with Falcao was cancelled.

==== Andrade vs. Kautondokwa ====
On July 12, the WBO ordered Billy Joe Saunders (26-0, 12 KOs) to make a mandatory defence against Andrade, with both sides having 10 days to reach a deal. On July 13, it was reported that Andrade would be unveiled as one of Eddie Hearn's Matchroom Boxing USA's signing with a deal that would see him fighting on DAZN. On July 17, at the official launch, Andrade was introduced as one of Matchroom Boxing USA's signings. At this point, it was revealed Andrade would likely make his ring return in October 2018 however there was no confirmation whether Hearn would participate in the purse bid for Saunders vs. Andrade. On 25 July, the purse bid, which was scheduled for the evening, was cancelled after it was revealed that Eddie Hearn and Frank Warren had reached a deal for the fight to take place in USA under the Matchroom USA banner on DAZN. It was said that representatives of Top Rank were scheduled to be present at the purse bid to try and secure the fight for ESPN+. With Matchroom USA having promotional rights on the fight, Warren confirmed the fight would take place on Sky Sports in the United Kingdom and not BT Sport. On 9 August, according to Hearn, the fight would take place at the TD Garden in Boston, Massachusetts on 20 October.

On 27 September, ESPN's Dan Rafael first reported that Saunders had tested positive for banned substance oxilofrine, known as a stimulant. The test was carried out by the Voluntary Anti-Doping Association (VADA) on 30 August. Hearn stated he would wait to see if the Massachusetts commission will allow Saunders to fight, however confirmed Andrade would still appear in the main event, whether it be a vacant world title or a non-title bout. Promoter Warren claimed the positive test was due to a nasal spray and was permitted by UKAD. The BBBofC also stated Saunders was not in breach of their regulations. At a hearing, the MSAC denied Saunders a license, meaning he could not defend his title against Andrade. According to reports, the cancellation meant Saunders team would be losing around $2.3 million. WBO president, Paco Valcarcel told ESPN, Saunders would not be stripped immediately, as Saunders would likely appeal and Andrade's fight against Namibian boxer Walter Kautondokwa (17-0, 16 KOs), who at the time was ranked #2 with the WBO, would be for the vacant WBO intertim title. On October 11, Saunders voluntarily vacated the title, which meant the bout would be for the full WBO title. According to sources, Andrade was still set to receive his $800,000 purse for the fight.

In front of 6,874 in attendance, Andrade became a two-weight world champion, capturing the vacant WBO title after he dropped Kautondokwa four times in the fight en route to winning via unanimous decision. The scorecards read 120–104, 120–104 and 119–105 in Andrade's favour. At least two of the knockdowns were due to balance issues. In the opening round, Andrade dropped Kautondokwa with a left to the head. While Kautondokwa was on the canvas, Andrade hit him again with a shot to the head that badly hurt him.Referee Steve Willis did not acknowledge the foul. Late in round 3, Andrade landed left hand to the jaw that dropped Kautondokwa for a second time. Reaching the 2 minute mark in round 4, Andrade landed overhand left that sent Kautondokwa to the canvas for the third rime in the fight. At the same time, Kautondokwa landed a left hand which forced Andrade's glove to touch the canvas, however referee Willis did not credit Kautondokwa's knockdown. Kautondokwa got up, but shortly hit with a straight left, sending him down again. At the midway point of the fight, Andrade had wide lead on the scorecards. He then stayed away from Kautondokwa's powerful right hand by circling the ring in the last half of the contest. Occasionally, Andrade was hit hard by Kautondokwa, but he was able to handle his power. After the fight, Andrade said, "After a one-year layoff, my second bout at 160, [I am] the new middleweight champion of the world, Demetrius Andrade. I feel good. I definitely think I carried my power well, and we're just going to keep building and growing for the 160-pound division, and I want to fight the best out there." He also praised Kautondokwa for his toughness. According to CompuBox, Andrade landed 152 of 501 punches thrown (30%), and Kautondokwa landed 45 of his 325 thrown (14%). Kautondokwa did not land more than 8 punches in a single round.

==== Andrade vs. Akavov ====
On December 21, 2018 Matchroom Boxing announced Andrade would make the first defence of his newly won WBO belt against Russian boxer Artur Akavov (19-2 8 KOs) at the Hulu Theater at Madison Square Garden in New York on January 18, 2019, live and exclusive on DAZN. Akavov as well known for travelling to Glasgow in December 2016 and giving Billy Joe Saunders a tough night. This was the first time Andrade would fight at Madison Square Garden, although it would not be the main arena. On the announcement, Andrade stated, “People might not know much about Akavov, but this is a guy who went overseas and gave Saunders absolute hell. Most people thought that he should have won the fight. This is an optional defense, so I could have fought anyone I wanted, but we chose to fight a guy that we know is going to bring it all night long and a guy who in many people’s eyes beat Saunders." In May 2018, Akavov won the WBO International title, which propelled him to #8 in the WBO super middleweight rankings. Andrade wanted to fight all champions and undefeated boxers and felt, with a world title, he was in a good position to do this. At the weigh-in, Andrade came in at 159.8 pounds and Akavov weighed 160 pounds. Hearn praised Andrade at the final press conference saying, “I honestly don’t believe we’ve yet seen the best of Demetrius Andrade. He’s a fighter that America should really get behind.”

Andrade dominated through most of the fight, and managed to stop Akavov in the final round, with 2:36 on the clock. It was seemingly a premature stoppage by referee Arthur Mercante Jr., who stopped the fight after Andrade caused Akavov to lose balance against the ropes after landing a right hook followed by a body shot. Akavov was not competitive, but was upset, as he had fought hard to go the distance. Akavov did not look hurt when the fight was stopped. After the fight, Mercante tried to approach Akavov multiple times, to explain the stoppage, but Akavov walked away each time. At the time of stoppage, Akavov only won one round on the scorecards. Andrade landed 181 of his 865 punches thrown (21%) and Akavov landed only 41 of his 263 punches thrown (16%). Andrade called out Gennady Golovkin during the post-fight interviews. He said, "All I can do is just keep destroying the top 15. After I keep destroying the top 15, they have nobody else but GGG, Canelo, Danny Jacobs and all those great guys up there. That's all we're looking to do, make great fights, baby. That's it. And may the best man win."

On January 22, the WBO ordered Andrade to fight Saunders (27-0, 13 KOs), who had recently had his ban lifted. Both parties were given 30 days to reach an agreement. In May 2019, after passing on the chance to challenge for the WBO title, Saunders explained that financially, the fight did not make sense for him, and also he would move up to super middleweight, he would fight for the vacant WBO belt. He said the there was more willing challengers.

==== Andrade vs. Sulęcki ====
During a press conference on May 24, 2019, Andrade's next title defence was formally announced against WBO's #2 ranked Maciej Sulęcki (29-1, 14 KOs) to take place from Andrade's hometown of Providence in Rhode Island at the Dunkin Donuts Center on June 29, on DAZN. The fight was first discussed weeks prior. This was a long overdue homecoming for Andrade, who had never fought in Rhode Island, during his 11-year career. Up until now, he had only fought in the States close by and in the New England area. At the press conference, Andrade said, “It’s my homecoming, it’s an exciting moment for me, my family and my team. It’s a great honor to be headlining at home.” Hearn also expressed his happiness at bringing Rhode Island its first world title fight in 28 years. The last one being Vinny Paz defending his world title in 1991. Andrade explained one of the conditions of his new contract with Matchroom Boxing and DAZN was to have a homecoming fight. He also praised DAZN, due to the fact that he is more active, with this fight making it 3 headline bouts in just over 8 months. The final press conference face-off was heated following the comments Andrade made before hand, “I’m going to hit that big melon head of his. He has a gigantic head! I can hit that sh*t all day with my eyes closed!”. He vowed to be the first to stop Sulęcki. Both weighed below the limit with Andrade weighing in at 159.9 pounds and Sulęcki checking in lighter at 159.5 pounds.

After dropping Sulęcki in the opening round, Andrade went on to win via 12-round unanimous decision in front of 7,136 in attendance. Andrade dropped Sulęcki with a straight left in the first round. Sulęcki beat the count and Andrade went on the offence. Sulęcki dropped to the canvas again, but referee Eddie Claudio ruled it a slip. During the flurry, Sulęcki landed a clean punch on Andrade, which hurt him. After that round, Andrade was mostly defensive for the remainder of the fight, following instruction from his corner. Andrade was too slick for Sulęcki and coasted through the rounds, hurting Sulęcki at times. Before round 10, Andrade's corner advised him to add more offense. Andrade came out and landed hooks to the head and body, but ultimately, Andrade was tired. All three judges has the same 120-107 clean sweep for Andrade. He called out Canelo during the post-fight. Sulęcki praised Andrade in his post-fight interview. Through a translator he said, “He was too fast, very difficult to hit. He was simply better.” CompuBox showed that Andrade landed 133 of 496 punches (26.8%) and Sulęcki landed only 51 of his 331 punches (15.4%). Andrade took home a career-high $1.5 million purse, while Sulęcki earned a $400,000 purse for his efforts.

On October 3, 2019 the WBO ordered Andrade and his team to enter the 30-day negotiations with mandatory challenger, 24 year old Steven Butler (28-1-1, 24 KOs). Butler was on a 10-fight win streak since his only loss, which occurred in 2017 against Brandon Cook. A week later, it was reported that Butler had instead opted to challenge WBA “regular” champion Ryota Murata in Japan. Butler was approached with an offer from Eddie Hearn, however after weighing up the options, Butler said the offer to fight in Japan was more lucrative.

==== Andrade vs. Keeler ====
On December 4, 2019, Andrade's next defence was confirmed to take place in January 2020. Although Hearn did not confirm the date or opponent, he was rumoured to fight Irish boxer Luke Keeler (17-2-1, 5 KOs), ranked #3 by the WBO and #10 by the IBF at middleweight. Keeler had previously beaten Luis Arias in August 2019, his career-best win. Keeler also hinted a big fight, as he had recently pulled out of a fight in Scotland in November 2019, citing he was in big fight negotiations. The fight was approved by the WBO as a voluntary defence, with the condition that the winner would next make a mandatory defence. On December 12, the card was formally announced to take place at Meridian at Island Gardens in Miami, Florida on January 30, 2020, a Thursday. Heading into the fight, Keeler was on an 8-fight unbeaten run.

The press conference was heated as Keeler called Andrade 'deluded', claiming he had never fought anyone elite. Keeler believed he got under his skin and thought Andrade was not taking him as a serious contender, as Andrade was discussing potential fights ahead. With this mindset, Keeler felt confident he would become the first to beat Andrade. He laughed off Keeler's comments, but at the same time praised Keeler for stepping up and taking the fight. He said, “Delusional? That’s a good one! I’ll give Luke credit where it’s due, it’s hard to get people to get in there with me and it’s his first World title fight, so I am expecting him to bring his A-game. I’m bringing mine too as I know what it’s like." Andrade admitted he doesn't watch videos of boxers, but rather focuses more on himself and what he can improve. He's fairly confident he can adjust in the ring depending on his opponents style. At the final presser, Andrade donned a t-shirt with the writing, ‘Luke, I Am Your Father' on the front, in reference to The Empire Strikes Back. This was Keeler's first world title challenge and his debut in the United States. Keeler said he had improved from his last fight and not coming to lie down. Andrade laughed off everything Keeler said, saying he did not understand him. He said Keeler was not getting under his skin. He finished off by saying, “All this talk, he’s gonna shock the world, he’s gonna take my title. Man, he ain’t doing none of that." Many observers felt the fight was an easy touch for Andrade.

On January 23, Andrade signed a 4-fight contract extension with Matchroom Boxing USA. The fight with Keeler marked fight #1 of the new deal. Andrade weighed 159.6 pounds and Keeler stood on the scales at 159.4 pounds. Andrade claimed he had never heard of Keeler before the fight was announced. He did not mean this in disrespect however, and said 'those type of people' were not on his radar.

Andrade stopped Keeler in the 9th round to retain his WBO title for the third time. Andrade walked out wearing a Darth Vader mask to the Star Wars imperial march music. He started the fight quick knocking Keeler down in just the opening seconds following an overhand left. In round 2, Keeler was knocked down twice more. The first after a straight left in the closing 15 seconds, which caused Keeler trouble. Andrade began to box smart over the next few rounds rather than look for the finish. Keeler played his part in landing a few shots of his own, but ultimately it was Andrade who was the dominant of the two for the vast majority of the rounds. In the ninth, Andrade went on the offensive and tried to close the fight by unleashing a flurry of punches on Keeler, which prompted the referee Telis Assemenios to stop the fight and award Andrade the TKO win at 2:59 of the round.

Discussing his fast start to the fight, Andrade said, "I went in there a little delusional thinking to myself, 'I can put him out.' So that's what I did. Try to go in there and put him out, let him know I'm not delusional. I'm entertaining. You gotta love it, and I come to put on a show all the time." It was revealed that Hearn offered promotional-free Jermall Charlo, who was affiliated with Premier Boxing Champions, a deal worth $7 million, a career-high, to fight Andrade, which was snubbed. Andrade also stated he was willing to move to super middleweight to make bigger fights. Keeler praised Andrade, “It wasn’t my night. I gave it my best shot and it wasn’t enough. Fair play to Demetrius – he’s a great champion." Andrade's dominance showed on Compubox, with Andrade landing 146 of his 385 punches thrown (38%), and Keeler landed just 34 of his 298 thrown (11%). According to ESPN, Andrade was now on a run of 57 consecutive rounds of opponents landing less than 10 punches on him.

=== Super middleweight ===
==== Andrade vs. Hernández-Harrison cancelled fight ====
On October 15, 2020 Andrade's next fight was announced to take place at the Seminole Hard Rock Hotel & Casino in Hollywood, Florida at the super middleweight limit of 168 pounds against the undefeated Dusty Hernández-Harrison (34-0-1, 20 KOs) in a non-title fight on November 27. The fight was scheduled for ten rounds. The bout would be televised on DAZN in the United States and promoted by Eddie Hearn's Matchroom Boxing. Andrade claimed he was 'testing the waters' at the higher weight class, as he aimed to become a three-weight world champion in the future. WBO had already confirmed British Liam Williams as the WBO mandatory challenger. Hernández-Harrison tested positive for COVID-19 and had to pull out of the fight. The fight got cancelled and Andrade looked for a new opponent. Hearn announced that Andrade would it out the remainder of the year and return in February 2021.

=== Middleweight ===
==== Andrade vs. Williams ====
On November 25, 2020, during a video conference, Hearn stated Andrade would likely fight his mandatory challenger Liam Williams (23-2-1, 18 KOs) in February 2021, whilst still in pursuit of a big fight. Hearn was looking at the fight to take place in Providence. On the fight, Williams said: “It’s looking like 2021 could be something special for me and my family. I’m looking forward to fighting Andrade, beating him and then becoming a Dad once again. I am told that the Andrade fight is pretty much done and it’s just a case of finding out where and when it will be." Williams was referring to his partner, who was due to give birth in May. Andrade was still hoping for a fight with Saunders, who had won the vacant WBO super middleweight title in May 2019. Andrade told Hearn that he would be willing to take a pay cut to make the fight happen.

On January 15, 2021 the WBO ordered Andrade's representatives to start negotiating with Queensberry Promotions for the mandatory fight. They were given 15 days. A purse bid was close to being prepared in February, however on February 10, Hearn informed everyone via social media that a deal was agreed for the fight to take place in USA in April. Williams was excited for the opportunity, saying he had been calling Andrade out for a long time. Speaking to IFL tv, he said, “I honestly feel I’ll knock Andrade out and hurt him bad. I’ve been asked a lot of times where is the ideal place to fight him, and I’ve always said in his hometown. He says everyone is avoiding him, but I’ve been calling him out for ages." Williams expected Andrade to vacate rather than defend the belt against him. A press release announced the fight to take place on April 17 at the Hard Rock Live at Seminole Hard Rock Hotel & Casino in Hollywood, Florida. The fight would mark William's first in the United States. He was ranked #3 by the WBO and on a 7-fight win streak. Jaime Munguia was the #1 ranked with WBO, however passed on the opportunity to fight Andrade. It was William's first attempt at a world title, having only previously made a losing attempt at the WBO interim light middleweight title in 2017. Andrade sent a warning to Williams for all the trash talk he had done prior to the fight being announced. Andrade stated, “Liam Williams, you got what you wanted. You ran your mouth, got your rating up and here we go. April 17 your career ends. Or maybe you go back to headlining small club shows in the UK I don’t know." At the weight in, Andrade scaled at 159½ pounds, whilst Williams weighed in on 160 pound limit. During the face-off, Williams had to be pulled away by security when he tried to touch Andrade's dreadlocks.

On fight night, Andrade scored a knockdown in round two as the bout went the distance, with Andrade winning via unanimous decision. Both boxers were hurt numerous times during the fight. It was Andrade who inflicted more damage as he gave Williams trouble with his uppercuts and combinations. The shots which bothered Williams the most was when Andrade hit his uppercuts from a low angle. With the shots he took, Williams did well to last the distance. Andrade started the fight quick, wobbling Williams with a 3-punch combination, but Williams was able to hold. The knockdown in round 2 came after a straight left, 30 seconds before the round was due to end. Williams scarcely beat the count. The three judges scored 118-109, 118-109 and 116-111 in Andrade's favour.

Andrade was respectful towards Williams after the fight. He said, “Hell of a fighter, tough, strong. “He comes to fight and that’s the type of fight people want to see me in. That’s what we did. I showed out. I performed the way I needed to to get the W. My hat goes off to him.” Williams credited Andrade's slick style. Williams told a reporter, "I don’t feel I need to take a step back, I believe now I am world level. I know I gave him a bit of stick in the build-up but he is quality." He was better than he'd expected.

==== Altercation with Alvarez at presser ====
On May 8, following Álvarez's stoppage win over Saunders, Andrade and his father Paul attended the post-fight press conference. There was a confrontation after a voice at the back of the room asked a question, “So, when can we get something going on?”, to which Álvarez then realised it was Andrade who was situated at the back of the room. Álvarez laughed and put his head down. Andrade then asked, “What’s up, though?. When can we make it happen?”. Álvarez insulted Andrade and his record, saying he hasn't fought anyone. Álvarez then shouted, “Get the f--- out of here, man,” and began singing “Payday. Payday. You want payday. I know.” Andrade was then escorted out by security, not before he said, “Once I see you, it’s on.” The whole interaction was said to be out of character for Álvarez, who normally conducted himself in a respectful manner. Speaking on matter a week later, Andrade felt he approached the situation in a respectful manner. He said Álvarez acted out cowardly and showed lack of respect.

==== Andrade vs. Quigley ====
On July 13, 2021 Andrade vented his frustration towards Golovkin not fighting him and towards DAZN Boxing. There was no reason for the fight not to happen as both boxers were with DAZN, so there was no conflict in broadcasters. Andrade said in the rant, "Of course Golovkin won't fight me. DAZN Boxing, make him unify! [Promoter] Tom Loeffler, you don't got enough confidence in your guy?? Yeah, this is a direct challenge to Tom, [trainer] Johnathan Banks and GGG... Where [are] your balls?" Andrade was in a position to make a voluntary defence.

In October 2021, after failing to make fights with Golovkin and Jermall Charlo, Matchroom announced Andrade would make a voluntary defence against 30-year old Irish boxer Jason Quigley (19-1, 14 KOs), WBO’s 10th-ranked contender, on November 19, a Sunday special at the SNHU Arena in Manchester, New Hampshire. Andrade complimented his opponent for taking on the fight, “Jason Quigley, world rated, good amateur pedigree, decent skills, comes to fight, and hats off to him, he’s actually willing to step in the ring with me, which you can’t say for any of these other so-called top guys. On November 19, though, I show him that there are levels to this game.” Quigley was coming off his biggest career win defeating Shane Mosley Jr. in May 2021. Quigley held a press conference in his native Ireland to promote the fight. Quigley believed he had the skills to cause an upset and he was happy to step in and challenge for a world title. He expected to have full support of the Irish fans and for their support to outweigh the support for Andrade. Andrade weighed in at the 160-pound limit and Quigley, who was making his first world title challenge, weighed 159.8 pounds.

Andrade made a big statement on fight night knocking out Quigley in round 2, retaining his world title for a fifth and final time. Quigley was dropped hard in round 1, and twice more in round 2. Referee Arthur Mercante Jr. waved it off at 2:24 of the round. The fight opened slight cagey from both boxers until Quigley landed a right hand on Andrade. This caught the attention of Andrade, who then landed a right hand of his own to the head, dropping him. Quigley beat the count and saw the end of the round. Some felt Andrade would coast to another decision, as his previous bouts, he started fast in dropping his opponents, only to coast to a decision win. This was not the case as Quigley was dropped in round 2, only for the referee to rule a slip. Quigley was then forced to take a knee The fight continued, with Andrade cornering Quigley and landing a flurry or mostly overhand rights, dropping him a third and final time, which then prompted the referee to step in.

Quigley was only credited to landing 9 punches. Speaking after the fight, Andrade said, "Every time I get in the ring, I do something different, and I can do it all and whatever I need. ... You asked for KOs and I give you KOs, so let's go ... I'm 31-0, Olympian and world champion, so what more do I need to do?" He showed his frustration after the fight. He told a reporter, “I ain’t go no messages. I’m not gonna call anyone out. Whoever wants to fight, let’s fight. However, we got to make things happen, let’s make things happen. It’s not about Charlo. It’s about everybody. It’s about who’s on DAZN, who’s with Matchroom. There’s a lot of big fights here. There are a lot of big fights that can be made.” At this stage, Andrade was not sure who would challenge him next.

==== Inactivity ====
Andrade had struggled to make the 160 limit in recent fights. On the move up to 168 pounds, Hearn said, “We’ve gotta do something, right? We can’t just keep taking [low level] fights.” Hearn's aim with Andrade was always to get him a big money fight, even if that now meant vacating a world title to make that happen. Purse bids were scheduled for February 25 after a further 10-day extension was granted. As super champion, Andrade would be entitled to 65% of winning purse bid. Frank Warren of Queensberry Promotions, won the purse bid, with an offer of $1,834,050, which was higher than the $1,750,000, which came from Eddie Hearn. As per splits, Andrade would received a $1,192,132.50 purse, with the remaining $641,917.50 for Parker to take home. Hearn did not believe the fight had any commercial value, which explained the reason his offer. He was asked why he lost the purse bid. Speaking to IFL tv, his responded, “When you make a bid for a fight, you make a bid in relation to the commercial value of that fight. It doesn't matter if you lose it by $60,000 or $70,000 or you lose it by $5 million. That’s your interpretation of the value. Demetrius Andrade against Zach Parker really has absolutely no interest in America at all, quite frankly. And that was the value of the fight we were bidding for in America.” He stated the fight was not big enough to stage in the UK either. Warren was planning on holding the fight at Pride Park stadium in Derby, Parker's hometown. He felt as he won the bid, his fighter should get the home advantage. Andrade has previously fought outside of USA in 2017, when he travelled to Germany to defeat Jack Culcay. Andrade accepted the terms and on March 19, the fight was officially announced. The fight would take place on BT Sport in the UK, rather than DAZN, as Queensberry had an exclusive tv deal with them, with the date being May 21, 2022. Parker was on a 3-fight knockout win streak, having knocked out opponents who had previously not been stopped.

Hearn indicated he and Andrade would part ways after the fight. Hearn stated some reasons for this and expected Andrade to sign with another promoter. One of the reasons behind the split would be due to Hearn and DAZN not being able to give him a big fight. He suggested Andrade was not able to bring in new subscribers to the DAZN app, due to his 'limited commercial appeal'. There was no ill will in the decision. On May 2, it was reported the fight was postponed as Andrade had suffered a right shoulder injury. According to Warren, the event had already sold 15,000 tickets. If the fight was rescheduled, it would no longer take place at the stadium.

On May 24, 2022, the WBO stated that Andrade needed to either vacate or defend his middleweight title against interim holder Alimkhanuly, with the fight needing to take place by November 17, 2022. Alimkhanuly won the interim title after he travelled to Birmingham and knocked out Danny Dignum. On July 22, the fight was officially ordered and teams had 30 days to reach a deal. Andrade post a video to social media where he criticized Chris Eubank Jr. after he declined to accept an offer of over one million dollars to fight him. There was no mention as to what weight the fight would take place or who would be financing the deal. At this time, Eubank Jr. was in negotiations to fight Conor Benn.

In August, it was reported that Andrade would vacate his middleweight title to revisit negotiations with Parker in a mandatory eliminator fight for the WBO super middleweight title held by Canelo Álvarez. Andrade officially vacated the middleweight title later that month.

On August 23, 2023 Andrade's request to the WBO, to sanction a fight with Parker for the interim world title was approved. His manager Ed Farris and Dmitry Salita where negotiating on his behalf. Parker made a comment about Andrade saying, “Shit house bottled it last time. See if he’s gonna step up to the plate this time.” Terms were not agreed in time and the fight went to purse bids. The minimum bid was $300k. Queensberry Promotions, on behalf of Parker, were the sole bidders, coming in at $305,000. The plan was to stage the fight on November 5 in the UK. The split was still 60/40 in Andrade's favour, which would mean he would take a $183,000 purse. This was an 80% purse cut to what he would have received after the first purse bids took place. On September 27, Andrade withdrew from the fight. Parker understandably felt his career had been further stalled. On withdrawing from the fight, Andrade told a reporter, “You got people that are smart. You got people that just like don’t really know what they’re talking about. You got fight fans that’s just oblivious to things. I’m not gonna go fight over in this guy’s country for $150,000, when we were supposed to fight the first time I was supposed to make like $1-point-something [million]. Due to injury, I just needed some more time, just like if it would’ve happened to somebody else. That’s just not happening.” Because the fight was for the interim super middleweight title, Andrade was aware, this did not guarantee him a fight with Álvarez, as ultimately, it would be Álvarez's decision.

=== Super middleweight ===
==== Andrade vs. Nicholson ====
On December 5, Andrade was added to the undercard of the Gervonta Davis vs. Hector Luis Garcia Showtime PPV on January 7, 2023 from the Capital One Arena in Washington, D.C. He would make his super middleweight debut against veteran journeyman Demond Nicholson (26-4-1, 22 KOs) in a non-title 10 round bout. The card was promoted by Premier Boxing Champions. On the fight, Andrade said, “I’m definitely looking to put on a show. Skills, the power of course, and later on in the rounds, of course a stoppage.” It was Andrade's first fight in 13 months. Andrade was tired of fighting mandatories in his previous title reign and wanted the big names of the sport. He hoped a win here would improve his chances further of a big marquee name and potentially becoming a 3-weight world champion. During the final press conference, Nicholson was asked by Showtime's Brian Custer if the fight would go the distance. He responded '"no", to which Andrade jumped in saying, “I guess Demond’s going down – early. Demond goes down. Demond goes down.” Nicholson predicted he would stop Andrade and also felt he was being disregarded as an opponent as Andrade was mentioning Charlo's name during the build up.

Andrade scored two knockdowns and earned a unanimous decision victory. In the fifth round, Nicholson appeared to drop Andrade for a flash knockdown with a body shot, however, it was ruled a slip by the referee Malik Waleed. Nicholson went down in round 2, however disputed this saying he had slipped. The knockdown was given. The second knockdown came in the last minute of the fight following a left hand from Andrade. There was also a knockdown in the seventh round, which was not given. Referee ruled that Andrade had hold of Nicholson and then dropped him with a punch. All three judges had the same shutout 100-88 score for Andrade. On the win, Andrade said, “I felt good, I can definitely tell the difference at the new weight. But the speed and combinations and using my IQ was the plan today and that’s what we did. The weight was different.” Andrade out-landed Nicholson 145 to 28. He connected 45% of his punches.

On May 15, 2023, Jermall Charlo told reporters that he had spoken on the phone for an hour with Andrade, negotiating a possible fight. Charlo said he was prepared to go into a bout with Andrade without the need of fighting a tune-up.

==== Andrade vs. Benavidez ====
According to ESPN's Mike Coppinger in August 2023, a deal between Andrade and former world champion David Benavidez (27-0, 23 KOs) was being finalised with a target date before the end of the year. Andrade had struggled to get a big name in the ring and Benavidez was considered as the bogeyman of the 168 weight division. Benavidez had beaten Caleb Plant in March 2023, a career-best win. On October 1, the fight and card was confirmed to take place on Showtime PPV, on November 25 at the Frost Bank Center in San Antonio, Texas. There was an interesting stat heading into the contest for Andrade, as Benavidez would mark the first time Andrade would ever compete against a former world champion in his 15-year professional career. At this stage, none of his previous opponents had ever gone on to win a world title. It was also Andrade's first PPV headline fight. The event was yet to be formally announced and a week later the handlers moved the event to take place in Las Vegas at the Michelob ULTRA Arena, before officially announcing the card on October 12. This would be Andrade's second time fighting in Las Vegas, last being November 2011.

Speaking at the press conference, Andrade said, “I’m having a great training camp and I can’t wait for November 25. I expect myself and David Benavidez to bring our best on fight night and give the fans a memorable matchup. I have the tools and ability to beat anybody, and I’ll win this fight because of the confidence I have in my skills.” Benavidez was expecting no less than a stoppage win for himself. The fight was contested for Benavidez's interim WBC super middleweight title. Andrade was confident he could find multiple ways to win, by relying on his ability and movement. He hoped a win here would propel him on to even bigger fights and domination of the super middleweight division. Benavidez weighed in at 167 pounds, whilst Andrade was a little heavier at 167.6 pounds.

Before the fight, it was reported by ESPN Andrade had rehydrated to 190 pounds, since the weigh in. Andrade suffered his first professional career defeat, being stopped in round 6, after the towel came in, giving Benavidez the TKO win. He started the fight quick, winning the opening couple of rounds. The tide changed in the fourth round. Andrade was in his rhythm, boxing well until Benavidez connected with a hard right hand, dropping Andrade to the floor. Andrade beat the count, but was hit with a huge left hook followed by combinations. Instead of attempting to slow down the pace of the fight in round 5, Andrade showed his toughness in trying to trade blows with Benavidez. Andrade again started the sixth round confidently, landing his own combinations and an uppercut, which pushed his opponent back but Benavidez continued to land hard shot. The round ended with Andrade with blood pouring from his mouth. His corner then waived off the fight. At the time of stoppage, the three judges scorecards read 59-54, 58-55 & 57-56 in favour of Benavidez.

During the post-fight interviews, Benavidez was greeted by former heavyweight champion Mike Tyson and he called out for a super fight against Álvarez. Andrade congratulated him, “I thought overall I did everything I needed to do to get the bigger man off me. David’s definitely a hell of a fighter. Nobody was even willing to get in the ring with him. I tried to become a three-division world champion. That’s not far-fetched. David was the man tonight. Congratulations to him and his family. We move on, and we’re gonna keep pushing.” Benavidez thought Andrade would be tougher opponent, which was said with no disrespect. According to Compubox, Benavidez landed 117 of 336 punches thrown (35%), 78 of them which came in round 5 and 6 alone, and Andrade landed 68 of his 259 thrown (26%). It was reported that Andrade would have a base purse of $1.5 million. According to Rick Glaser, the fight did less than 60,000 PPV buys, generating below $5 million in revenue.

==== Inactivity ====
Following the defeat, one of Andrade's trainers Andre Rozier felt he struggled with a bigger boxer and the size disadvantage. Rozier wanted Andrade to drop back down to middleweight and believed he could become successful in becoming a two-time world champion at the weight. Rozier stated there should not be an issue for him to drop the weight as long as he follows a nutrition change. Carlos Adames' name was brought up as he held the interim WBC belt. On December 31, 2024 Andrade appeared in an interview talking about personal struggles over the past year. He highlighted some names that he wanted to fight and confirmed that he would not be returning to middleweight, as he believed there was not much left to achieve in the division.

==== Return in 2026 ====
On June 5, 2026, it was announced that Andrade would make a return on July 24, headlining CES Boxing’s Championship Jackpot event at Mohegan Sun Arena in Uncasville, Connecticut, with his opponent yet to be announced. Despite his long period of inactivity, Andrade continued to call out top super‑middleweight fighters, including Caleb Plant, Jermall Charlo and Canelo Álvarez, arguing that many elite contenders avoided facing him. Andrade stated his intention to continue his career beyond the age of 40, following his first career defeat in 2023. Andrade remained confident in his status as an elite fighter, stating that the loss did not diminish his standing. He described his upcoming fight a tune-up aimed at regaining activity. Andrade cited his limited career damage and conditioning as reasons for extending his career, stating that he was “well preserved” and capable of competing into his 40s. Andrade faced Brazilian boxer Douglas Ataide in his comeback fight. He won by technical knockout in the first round when he sent his opponent to the canvas with a left hook and the referee stopped the bout without issuing a count.

== Outside of boxing ==
On December 6, 2018 it was reported that Andrade had been arrested after he was caught driving in his Mercedes with a Glock 19 pistol. The pistol was found in a Louis Vuitton bag. After doing some checks, the Providence Police found that Andrade did not have a permit to hold the gun. According to the reports, Andrade told the police he had the gun because of his 'fame and wealth', however the detective Maj. David Lapatin explained there was no reason not to have a permit regardless. Two policemen, who were driving along the road at 2:30 a.m. local time, originally came over to Andrade's car after he was seen blocking traffic talking to another person in a Mercedes. The police also found a magazine with 10 rounds in the bag. Andrade was released on bail the same day.

== Professional boxing record ==
34 fights	33 wins	1 loss
By knockout	20	1
By decision	13	0

No.	Result	Record	Opponent	Type	Round, time	Date	Location	Notes
34	Win	33–1	Douglas Ataide	TKO	1 (10), 2:09	Jul 24, 2026	Mohegan Sun Arena, Uncasville, Connecticut, U.S.	
33	Loss	32–1	David Benavidez	RTD	6 (12), 3:00	Nov 25, 2023	Michelob Ultra Arena, Paradise, Nevada, U.S.	For WBC interim super middleweight title
32	Win	32–0	Demond Nicholson	UD	10	Jan 7, 2023	Capital One Arena, Washington, D.C., U.S.	
31	Win	31–0	Jason Quigley	TKO	2 (12), 2:24	Nov 19, 2021	SNHU Arena, Manchester, New Hampshire, U.S.	Retained WBO middleweight title
30	Win	30–0	Liam Williams	UD	12	Apr 17, 2021	Seminole Hard Rock Hotel & Casino, Hollywood, Florida, U.S.	Retained WBO middleweight title
29	Win	29–0	Luke Keeler	TKO	9 (12), 2:59	Jan 30, 2020	Meridian at Island Gardens, Miami, Florida, U.S.	Retained WBO middleweight title
28	Win	28–0	Maciej Sulęcki	UD	12	Jun 29, 2019	Dunkin' Donuts Center, Providence, Rhode Island, U.S.	Retained WBO middleweight title
27	Win	27–0	Artur Akavov	TKO	12 (12), 2:36	Jan 18, 2019	Hulu Theater, New York City, New York, U.S.	Retained WBO middleweight title
26	Win	26–0	Walter Kautondokwa	UD	12	Oct 20, 2018	TD Garden, Boston, Massachusetts, U.S.	Won vacant WBO middleweight title
25	Win	25–0	Alantez Fox	UD	12	Oct 21, 2017	Turning Stone Resort Casino, Verona, New York, U.S.	
24	Win	24–0	Jack Culcay	SD	12	Mar 11, 2017	Friedrich-Ebert-Halle, Ludwigshafen, Germany	Won WBA (Regular) light middleweight title
23	Win	23–0	Willie Nelson	TKO	12 (12), 1:38	Jun 11, 2016	Turning Stone Resort Casino, Verona, New York, U.S.	
22	Win	22–0	Dario Fabian Pucheta	TKO	2 (10), 0:50	Oct 17, 2015	Mohegan Sun Arena, Montville, Connecticut, U.S.	Won vacant WBO International light middleweight title
21	Win	21–0	Brian Rose	TKO	7 (12), 1:19	Jun 14, 2014	Barclays Center, New York City, New York, U.S.	Retained WBO light middleweight title
20	Win	20–0	Vanes Martirosyan	SD	12	Nov 9, 2013	American Bank Center, Corpus Christi, Texas, U.S.	Won vacant WBO light middleweight title
19	Win	19–0	Freddy Hernández	UD	10	Jan 21, 2013	The Paramount, Huntington, New York, U.S.	
18	Win	18–0	Alexis Hloros	TKO	2 (10), 2:58	Sep 20, 2012	Verizon Wireless Arena, Manchester, New Hampshire, U.S.	
17	Win	17–0	Rudy Cisneros	KO	1 (10), 3:00	May 5, 2012	Mohegan Sun Arena, Montville, Connecticut, U.S.	
16	Win	16–0	Ángel Hernández	TKO	2 (10), 1:39	Feb 10, 2012	Mohegan Sun Arena, Montville, Connecticut, U.S.	
15	Win	15–0	Saul Duran	RTD	3 (10), 3:00	Sep 21, 2011	Verizon Wireless Arena, Manchester, New Hampshire, U.S.	
14	Win	14–0	Grady Brewer	UD	10	Aug 19, 2011	Horseshoe Casino, Hammond, Indiana, U.S.	
13	Win	13–0	Omar Bell	KO	2 (8), 1:31	Apr 22, 2011	Mohegan Sun Arena, Montville, Connecticut, U.S.	
12	Win	12–0	Alberto Herrera	UD	8	Jan 7, 2011	Cox Pavilion, Paradise, Nevada, U.S.	
11	Win	11–0	Dave Saunders	KO	2 (8), 2:55	Sep 15, 2010	Verizon Wireless Arena, Manchester, New Hampshire, U.S.	
10	Win	10–0	Geoffrey Spruiell	UD	6	Apr 2, 2010	Mohegan Sun Arena, Montville, Connecticut, U.S.	
9	Win	9–0	Bernardo Guereca	KO	1 (6), 1:18	Jan 15, 2010	Civic Center, Laredo, Texas, U.S.	
8	Win	8–0	Chris Chatman	UD	6	Oct 3, 2009	Twin River Event Center, Lincoln, Rhode Island, U.S.	
7	Win	7–0	John Williams	TKO	6 (6), 2:33	Sep 4, 2009	Twin River Event Center, Lincoln, Rhode Island, U.S.	
6	Win	6–0	Chad Greenleaf	KO	2 (6), 1:38	Aug 1, 2009	Mohegan Sun Arena, Montville, Connecticut, U.S.	
5	Win	5–0	Tony Hirsch	UD	4	Jun 19, 2009	Entertainment Center, Laredo, Texas, U.S.	
4	Win	4–0	Arnulfo Javier Romero	KO	2 (4), 2:53	Mar 20, 2009	Entertainment Center, Laredo, Texas, U.S.	
3	Win	3–0	Tom Joseph	TKO	1 (4), 1:53	Mar 6, 2009	Mohegan Sun Arena, Montville, Connecticut, U.S.	
2	Win	2–0	Eric Marriott	TKO	4 (4), 0:50	Nov 29, 2008	Twin River Event Center, Lincoln, Rhode Island, U.S.	
1	Win	1–0	Patrick Cape	TKO	2 (4), 0:24	Oct 23, 2008	Northern Quest Resort & Casino, Airway Heights, Washington, U.S.	

== Titles in boxing ==
=== Major world titles ===
- WBO light middleweight champion (154 lbs)
- WBO middleweight champion (160 lbs)

=== Secondary major world titles (Note: The secondary champion lineage lists the Regular or Unified champions while the primary champion is occupied.) ===
- WBA (Regular) light middleweight champion (154 lbs)

== Notes ==
Sporting positions
Amateur boxing titles
Previous: Austin Trout	U.S. welterweight champion 2005, 2006	Next: Brad Solomon
Previous: Joseph Heysquierdo	U.S. Golden Gloves welterweight champion 2006, 2007	Next: Steven Martinez
Regional boxing titles
Vacant Title last held by Oleksandr Spirko	WBO International light middleweight champion October 17, 2015 – June 2016; Vacated	Vacant Title next held by Magomed Kurbanov
World boxing titles
Preceded by Zaurbek Baysangurov	WBO light middleweight champion November 9, 2013 – July 31, 2015; Stripped	Vacant Title next held by Liam Smith
Preceded by Jack Culcay	WBA light middleweight champion Regular title March 11, 2017 – October 22, 2017; Vacated	Vacant Title next held by Brian Castaño
Vacant Title last held by Billy Joe Saunders	WBO middleweight champion October 20, 2018 – August 26, 2022; Vacated	Vacant Title next held by Janibek Alimkhanuly
