= Joe Greene (boxer) =

American boxer

Personal information
- Nickname: Mean
- Nationality: (United States) American
- Born: Joe Greene; February 15, 1986 (age 40) Brooklyn, New York
- Height: 5 ft 10 in (1.78 m)
- Weight: Light Middleweight

Boxing career
- Stance: Southpaw

Boxing record
- Total fights: 27
- Wins: 26
- Win by KO: 17
- Losses: 1
- Draws: 0
- No contests: 0

Joe Greene (born February 15, 1986) is an American professional boxer. Greene debuted in 2005, and fights out of Queens, New York.

== Amateur career ==
Greene was the 2004 National Golden Gloves Middleweight Champion.

== Professional career ==
Greene fought his first professional bout on March 5, 2005 against Curtis Mullins. Greene won by technical knockout in the second round. On August 8, 2007 on ESPN's Wednesday Night Fights Greene fought Darryl Salmon for the NABA middleweight title, Greene won by knockout in the first round.

On February 23, 2008, Greene defeated Francisco Antonio Mora at Madison Square Garden by knockout in the tenth round.

On August 13, 2008, Greene moved down in weight to the junior middleweight division (154 lbs). He claimed the NABA junior middleweight title by defeating Jose Miguel Torres.
