= Hassan Mwakinyo =

Tanzanian professional boxer (born 1995)

Personal information
- Nickname: Tornado
- Born: 15 March 1995 (age 31) Tanga, Tanzania
- Height: 5 ft 8 in (173 cm)
- Weight: Light-middleweight, Middleweight

Boxing career
- Reach: 72 in (183 cm)
- Stance: Orthodox

Boxing record
- Total fights: 29
- Wins: 25
- Win by KO: 19
- Losses: 4

Halfan Hythani Hamza (born March 15, 1995) known by the ring names Hassan Mwakinyo and Tornado is a Tanzanian professional boxer. He held the WBF Intercontinental light-middleweight title twice in 2020 until he was stripped from the title. He previously held the UBO International super light-middleweight title in 2018.

== Professional career ==
Mwakinyo made his professional boxing debut at the age of 20 against Alibaba R Tarimo on November 29, 2015. He has since recorded a total of 23 fights in which he won 20 fights and lost 3, without a draw. He has won several titles including;

- Tanzania super welterweight in 2016,
- East and Central Africa super welterweight in 2017
- WBA Pan Africa super welterweight in 2017
- UBO International super welterweight title in 2018
- WBF Intercontinental super welterweight in 2020
- ABU super welterweight title in 2021.

In 2022, Mwakinyo was banned by the British Boxing Board of Control (BBBC) two weeks after a defeat from the British Boxer Liam Smith without disclosing the reason behind banning of the Tanzanian boxer.

He fought Michel Soro for the vacant IBO middleweight title in Abidjan, Ivory Coast, on 10 June 2026. Mwakinyo lost by technical knockout in the ninth round.

== Professional boxing record ==
29 fights	25 wins	4 losses
By knockout	19	3
By decision	6	1

No.	Result	Record	Opponent	Type	Round, time	Date	Location	Notes
29	Loss	25–4	Michel Soro	TKO	9 (12), 1:57	10 Jun 2026	Abidjan, Ivory Coast	For vacant IBO middleweight title title
28	Win	25–3	Stanley Eribo	TKO	2 (10)	26 December 2025	Warehouse, Masaki, Dar-Es-Salaam	Retained WBO-Africa Middle-Weight Title and Won WBC-Africa Middle-Weight Title
27	Win	24–3	Daniel Lartey	TKO	9 (10)	16 November 2024	Warehouse, Masaki, Dar-Es-Salaam	Retained WBO-Africa Middle-Weight Title
26	Win	23–3	Patrick Allotey	TKO	3 (10)	1 June 2024	Warehouse, Masaki, Dar-Es-Salaam	Retained WBO-Africa Middle-Weight Title
25	Win	22–3	Elvis Ahorgah	TKO	7 (10)	27 January 2024	New Amani Complex, Zanzibar	Won Vacant WBO-Africa Middle-Weight Title
24	Win	21–3	Mardochee Kuvesa Katembo	UD	8 (8)	23 April 2023	Jamhuri Stadium, Dodoma	
23	Loss	20–3	Liam Smith	TKO	4 (12)	3 Sep 2022	Liverpool Arena, Liverpool, England	
22	Win	20–2	Julius Indongo	TKO	4 (12)	3 Sep 2021	Kilimanjaro Hall, Ubungo Plaza, Dar-Es-Salaam	Won African Boxing Union light-middleweight title
21	Win	19–2	Maiala Antonio	TKO	9 (12)	28 May 2021	Next Door Arena, Masaki, Dar-Es-Salaam	Won vacant African Boxing Union light-middleweight title
20	Win	18–2	Jose Carlos Paz	TKO	4 (12)	13 Nov 2020	Next Door Arena, Masaki, Dar-Es-Salaam	Retained WBF Inter-Continental light-middleweight title
19	Win	17–2	Bebe Rico Tshibangu	UD	12	14 Aug 2020	Mlimani City, Dar-Es-Salaam	Won vacant WBF Inter-Continental light-middleweight title
18	Win	16–2	Arnel Tinampay	MD	10	29 Nov 2019	Uhuru Stadium, Dar-Es-Salaam	
17	Win	15–2	Sergio Eduardo Gonzalez	KO	5 (8)	23 March 2019	Kenyatta International Conference Centre, Nairobi	
16	Win	14–2	Joseph Sinkala	TKO	2 (10)	28 Oct 2018	Mkwakwani Grounds, Tanga	Won vacant UBO International light-middleweight title
15	Win	13–2	Said Yazidu	KO	1 (10)	20 Oct 2018	Jitegemee Grounds, Tanga	
14	Win	12–2	Sam Eggington	TKO	2 (10)	8 Sept 2018	Utilita Arena, Birmingham, England	
13	Win	11–2	Ambokile C Mwambasi	UD	6	10 March 2018	National Indoor Stadium, Dar-Es-Salaam	
12	Loss	10–2	Lendrush Akopian	UD	10	2 Dec 2017	USC Soviet Wings, Moscow	For vacant WBC Youth world light-middleweight title
11	Win	10–1	Rajabu Maoja	TKO	4 (8)	30 Sept 2017	Tangamano Hall, Tanga	
10	Win	9–1	Six Bruno	TKO	1 (10)	14 Sept 2017	Tangamano Hall, Tanga	
9	Win	8–1	Anthony Jarmann	TKO	10 (12)	8 Aug 2017	Grand Palm Hotel, Gaborone	Won WBA Pan African light-middleweight title
8	Win	7–1	Seba Temba	TKO	5 (10)	12 Feb 2017	Tangamano Hall, Tanga	
7	Win	6–1	Maisha Samson	TKO	5 (6)	31 Dec 2016	Tangamano Hall, Tanga	
6	Win	5–1	Baraka Mwakansope	UD	6	25 Dec 2016	Tangamano Hall, Tanga	
5	Win	4–1	Shabani Kaoneka	KO	1 (6)	27 Nov 2016	Tangamano Hall, Tanga	
4	Win	3–1	Fadhil Keya	KO	1 (10)	29 Oct 2016	Tangamano Hall, Tanga	Won vacant Tanzania Pro Boxing Commission light-middleweight title
3	Loss	2–1	Shabani Kaoneka	KO	6 (10)	14 May 2016	National Indoor Stadium, Dar-Es-Salaam	For vacant Tanzania, Pugilistic Syndicate of the light-middleweight title
2	Win	2–0	Mohammed Kidari	PTS	4	25 Dec 2015	Jitegemee Stadium, Muheza	
1	Win	1–0	Alibaba R Tarimo	UD	6	29 Sept 2015	Tangamano Hall, Tanga	
