= Willie Nelson (boxer) =

American boxer

Personal information
- Nicknames: The Great, Quiet Storm
- Nationality: American
- Born: Willie Nelson; April 20, 1987 (age 39) Cleveland, Ohio
- Height: 6 ft 3 in (191 cm)
- Weight: Light-middleweight

Boxing career
- Reach: 77 in (197 cm)
- Stance: Orthodox

Boxing record
- Total fights: 31
- Wins: 27
- Win by KO: 17
- Losses: 3
- Draws: 1
- No contests: 0

Willie Nelson (born April 20, 1987) is an American professional boxer. He held the NABF light middleweight title from 2012 to 2013.

== Amateur career ==
Nelson as an amateur won a gold medal at the 2005 Tammer Tournament. Willie is a 2x National Amateur Gold Medalist. Willie had over 200 Amateur Victories, and many other awards through his amateur career.

== Professional career ==
On June 19, 2010 Nelson knocked out title contender Jesse Feliciano.

On June 11, 2016, Nelson lost to Demetrius Andrade in the 12th round.
