= Liam Williams (boxer) =

Welsh boxer (born 1992)

Personal information
- Nickname: The Machine
- Nationality: Welsh
- Born: 26 May 1992 (age 34) Church Village, Wales
- Height: 5 ft 10 in (178 cm)
- Weight: Light-middleweight; Middleweight
- Website: www.liamwilliams.co.uk

Boxing career
- Reach: 70 in (178 cm)
- Stance: Orthodox

Boxing record
- Total fights: 31
- Wins: 25
- Win by KO: 20
- Losses: 5
- Draws: 1

Liam Williams (born 26 May 1992) is a Welsh professional boxer. He has challenged once for the WBO interim light-middleweight title in 2017, and once for the WBO middleweight title in 2021. At regional level, he has held multiple championships, including the Commonwealth light-middleweight title from 2014 to 2015; the British light-middleweight title from 2015 to 2016; and the British middleweight title from 2018 to 2020.

== Early life ==
Williams was born in Church Village and currently resides in Clydach Vale in the Rhondda Valleys. Prior to his professional boxing career, he worked as a roofer.

== Amateur career ==
In an amateur career which he claims began at age nine, Williams says he won 44 out of 49 fights, gaining many awards in Britain and Europe. "I won seven Welsh titles at all age levels, including the 2011 Senior ABAs when I was just 18. I beat Warren Sinden, who’s now a pro, by a wide points margin in the 75KG final."

== Professional career ==
Williams turned professional as a light-middleweight in 2011. Aged 18, he won every round against the more experienced Ryan Clark and won the vacant Commonwealth light-middleweight title in November 2014 with a 2nd-round-stoppage win over Michael Lomax.

=== Williams vs. Carslaw ===
The following year, he added the vacant British national title by stopping Kris Carslaw in the second round of their bout at Manchester Arena.

=== Williams vs. Corcoran ===
He retained both titles in defeating a previously unbeaten Gary Corcoran at the Ice Arena Wales on 16 July 2016 with an 11th-round stoppage in what has been described as a gruesome grudge match.

=== Williams vs. Smith ===
Williams was controversially defeated by former WBO light-middleweight world champion Liam Smith on 8 April 2017 at the Manchester Arena. Owing to incorrect weight for the bout, Smith was ineligible to inherit the interim WBO light-middleweight world title (held by Canelo Álvarez who is moving to a higher weight and expected to vacate the title).

=== Williams vs. Fox ===
On 21 December 2019 Williams fought Alantez Fox, ranked #2 by the WBO and #12 by the IBF at middleweight. Williams won the fight with a fifth-round stoppage.

=== Williams vs. Robinson ===
On 10 October 2020 Williams defeated Andrew Robinson with a first-round knockout.

=== Williams vs. Andrade ===
On 17 April 2021, Williams unsuccessfully challenged undefeated WBO middleweight champion Demetrius Andrade for his world title, losing a unanimous decision with scores of 118–109, 118–109, 116–111.

=== Williams vs. Eubank Jr ===
On 5 February 2022 Williams fought Chris Eubank Jr, ranked #1 by the WBA, #3 by the WBC, #5 by the WBO and #7 by The Ring. Eubank Jr scored four knockdowns en route to a 12-round unanimous decision victory, the judges scoring it 117-109, 116-109 and 116-108 for Eubank Jr.

=== Williams vs. Sheeraz ===
Williams was stopped in round one by Commonwealth middleweight champion Hamzah Sheeraz at the Copper Box Arena in London on 10 February 2024.

=== Retirement and comeback ===
Williams announced his retirement from professional boxing in October 2024, stating he had suffered several concussions throughout his career and was concerned about chronic traumatic encephalopathy. In October 2025, he reversed his decision to retire, stating in a post on social media that "the time has come and I'm ready to rumble again." Williams is scheduled to make his return to the ring against Elvis Ahorgah in Lagos, Nigeria, on 31 July 2026.

== Professional boxing record ==
31 fights	25 wins	5 losses
By knockout	20	2
By decision	5	3
Draws	1	

No.	Result	Record	Opponent	Type	Round, time	Date	Location	Notes
31	Loss	25–5–1	Hamzah Sheeraz	TKO	1 (12), 2:36	10 Feb 2024	Copper Box Arena, London, England	For WBC Silver and Commonwealth middleweight titles
30	Win	25–4–1	Florin Cardos	TKO	1 (8), 1:17	24 Nov 2023	York Hall, London, England	
29	Win	24–4–1	Nizar Trimech	TKO	2 (10), 2:13	25 Nov 2022	York Hall, London, England	
28	Loss	23–4–1	Chris Eubank Jr.	UD	12	5 Feb 2022	Motorpoint Arena, Cardiff, Wales	
27	Loss	23–3–1	Demetrius Andrade	UD	12	17 Apr 2021	Seminole Hard Rock Hotel & Casino, Hollywood, Florida, US	For WBO middleweight title
26	Win	23–2–1	Andrew Robinson	KO	1 (12), 1:28	10 Oct 2020	BT Sport Studio, London, England	Retained British middleweight title
25	Win	22–2–1	Alantez Fox	TKO	5 (12), 2:59	21 Dec 2019	Copper Box Arena, London, England	Won vacant WBO Inter-Continental middleweight title
24	Win	21–2–1	Karim Achour	TKO	2 (12), 1:51	13 Jul 2019	The O2 Arena, London, England	Won vacant WBC Silver middleweight title
23	Win	20–2–1	Joe Mullender	KO	2 (12), 1:09	8 Mar 2019	Royal Albert Hall, London, England	Retained British middleweight title
22	Win	19–2–1	Mark Heffron	TKO	10 (12), 1:55	22 Dec 2018	Manchester Arena, Manchester, England	Won vacant British middleweight title
21	Win	18–2–1	Craig Nicholson	KO	2 (8), 2:36	7 Sep 2018	Vale Sports Arena, Cardiff, Wales	
20	Win	17–2–1	Darryl Sharp	TKO	3 (8), 1:49	14 Apr 2018	Ice Arena, Cardiff, Wales	
19	Loss	16–2–1	Liam Smith	MD	12	11 Nov 2017	Metro Radio Arena, Newcastle, England	
18	Loss	16–1–1	Liam Smith	RTD	9 (12), 3:00	8 Apr 2017	Manchester Arena, Manchester, England	For WBO interim light-middleweight title
17	Win	16–0–1	Gabor Görbics	TKO	8 (10), 1:30	26 Nov 2016	Motorpoint Arena, Cardiff, Wales	Won vacant WBO European light-middleweight title
16	Win	15–0–1	Gary Corcoran	TKO	11 (12), 2:10	16 Jul 2016	Ice Arena Wales, Cardiff, England	Retained British light-middleweight title
15	Win	14–0–1	Gustavo Alberto Sanchez	TKO	3 (8), 2:03	4 Jun 2016	Echo Arena, Liverpool, England	
14	Win	13–0–1	Kris Carslaw	TKO	2 (12), 0:10	19 Dec 2015	Manchester Arena, Manchester, England	Retain Commonwealth light-middleweight title; Won vacant British light-middleweight title
13	Win	12–0–1	Michael Lomax	TKO	1 (12), 2:48	27 Nov 2014	Hilton Hotel, London, England	Won vacant Commonwealth light-middleweight title
12	Win	11–0–1	Štěpán Horváth	KO	2 (8), 0:36	25 Oct 2014	Echo Arena, Liverpool, England	
11	Win	10–0–1	Ronnie Heffron	RTD	6 (10), 3:00	26 Jul 2014	Phones 4u Arena, Manchester, England	
10	Win	9–0–1	Yuri Pompilio	TKO	8 (8), 0:53	5 Apr 2014	Stadthalle, Rostock, Germany	
9	Draw	8–0–1	Tyan Booth	TD	3 (8), 1:08	7 Dec 2013	Echo Arena, Liverpool, England	TD after Booth cut from accidental head clash
8	Win	8–0	Darren Codona	PTS	8	17 Aug 2013	Cardiff International Arena, Cardiff, Wales	
7	Win	7–0	Jamie Ambler	PTS	6	4 May 2013	Rhondda Fach Sports Centre, Tylorstown, Wales	
6	Win	6–0	Dan Blackwell	TKO	3 (6), 1:16	23 Feb 2013	Newport Centre, Newport, Wales	
5	Win	5–0	Tony Randell	TKO	1 (4), 1:04	30 Nov 2012	Manchester Arena, Manchester, England	
4	Win	4–0	Paul Morby	TKO	1 (4), 0:21	22 Sep 2012	Rhondda Fach Sports Centre, Tylorstown, Wales	
3	Win	3–0	Gilson De Jesus	PTS	4	25 May 2012	Newport Centre, Newport, Wales	
2	Win	2–0	Tommy Tolan	PTS	4	25 Feb 2012	Motorpoint Arena, Cardiff, Wales	
1	Win	1–0	Ryan Clark	PTS	4	19 Nov 2011	Newport Centre, Newport, Wales	
