= 793 Naval Air Squadron =

Inactive flying squadron of the Royal Navy's Fleet Air Arm

- Squadron badge
- Active: 1939–1945
- Disbanded: 10 October 1945
- Country: United Kingdom
- Branch: Royal Navy
- Type: Fleet Air Arm Second Line Squadron
- Role: Air Towed Target Unit
- Size: Squadron
- Part of: Fleet Air Arm
- Home stations: RNAS Ford; RNAS Piarco

Insignia
- Squadron Badge Description: White, a falcon rising holding in its talons a target in military colours pierced in the centre by two arrows gold (1945)
- Identification Markings: W6A+ (Roc ~1943); W7A+ (Fulmar ~1943); W8A+ (Martinet ~1943)

Aircraft flown
- Attack: Fairey Albacore
- Fighter: Blackburn Roc; Fairey Fulmar
- Trainer: Miles Martinet

793 Naval Air Squadron (793 NAS), also known as 793 Squadron, is an inactive Fleet Air Arm (FAA) naval air squadron of the United Kingdom’s Royal Navy (RN) which last disbanded during October 1945. It was formed in October 1939 at RNAS Ford (HMS Peregrine), West Sussex, as an Air Towed Target Unit, as part of No.1 Observer School. It operated with Blackburn Roc, Fairey Fulmar, Fairey Albacore and Miles Martinet. From 1940 to disbandment it operated at RNAS Piarco (HMS Goshawk), Trinidad.

== History ==
=== Air Towed Target Unit (1939–1945) ===
793 Naval Air Squadron formed at RNAS Ford (HMS Peregrine), located at Ford, in West Sussex, England, on the 25 October 1939, as an Air Towed Target Unit and operating Blackburn Roc Mk.I aircraft, a British naval turret fighter which was used to tow targets for fighter aircraft training. A detachment was provided at RAF Warmwell, in Dorset, to tow targets for fighter aircraft based at RAF Exeter, in Devon, during August 1940.

On the 18 August 1940, a formation of Junkers Ju 87, or Stuka, dive bombers, attacked RNAS Ford as part of a large Luftwaffe force attacking airfields around Hampshire and Sussex. Twenty-eight personnel were killed and seventy-five were wounded in the raid, which also destroyed seventeen aircraft, damaged twenty-six more and caused significant infrastructure damage. The only part of the squadron to escape destruction was the detachment.

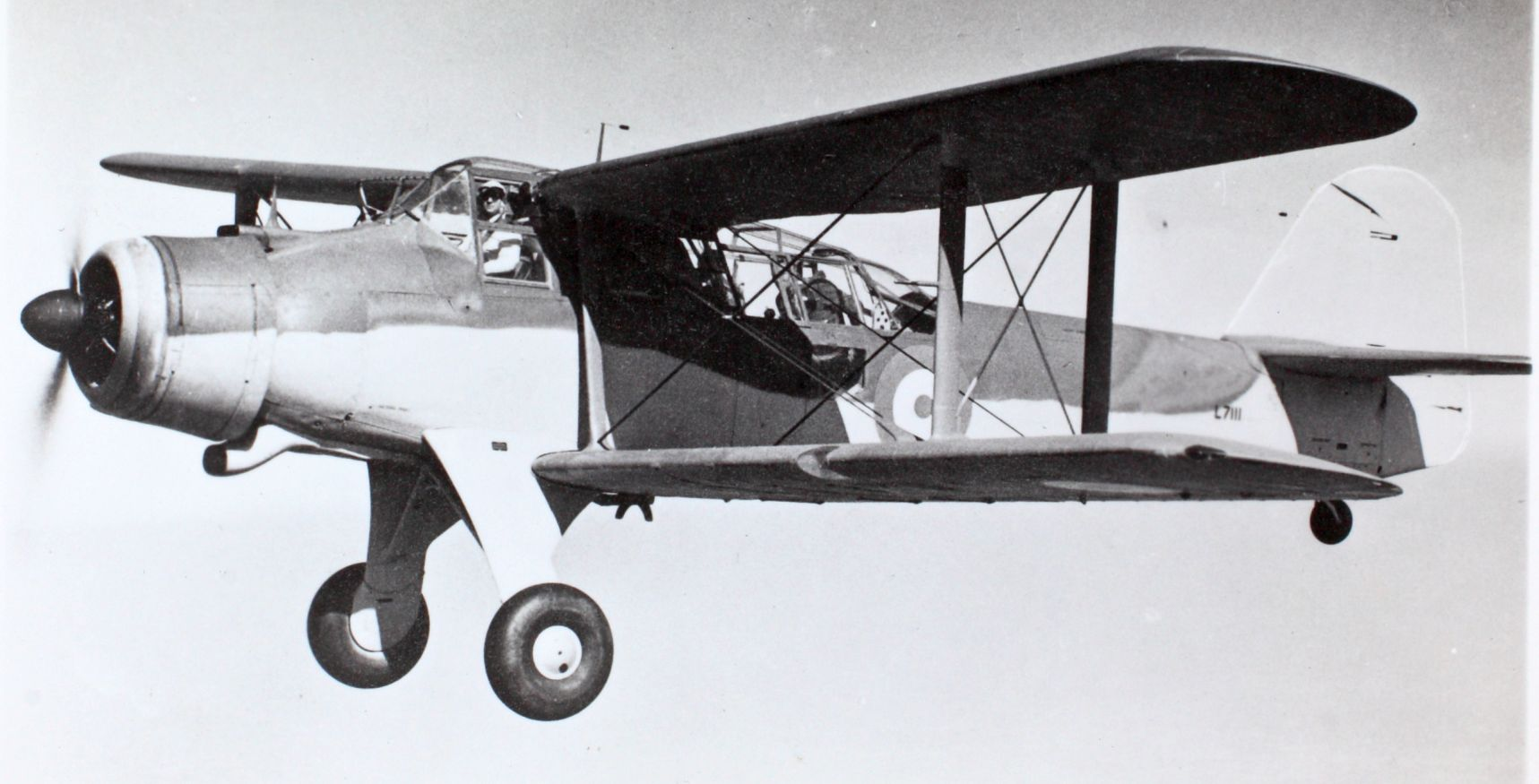
Fairey Albacore; an example of the type used by 793 Squadron

The raid prompted 793 Naval Air Squadron to be stood down and moved to RNAS Lee-on-Solent (HMS Daedalus), situated in Hampshire, England, in preparation for sailing to relocate to Trinidad and Tobago, located in the Caribbean, operating from Royal Naval Air Station Piarco, on the island of Trinidad, which began on the 18 November 1940.

The squadron's role was to support the training of observers for the Fleet Air Arm. It formed part of the No. 1 Observer School operating out of RNAS Piarco (HMS Goshawk), working alongside three Observer Training Squadrons: 749, 750 and 752 Naval Air Squadrons. Here, 793 Naval Air Squadron also operated Miles Martinet TT.Mk I, a dedicated aircraft for target towing, Fairey Fulmar, a British carrier-borne reconnaissance aircraft/fighter aircraft, and Fairey Albacore a single-engine biplane torpedo bomber aircraft.

793 Naval Air Squadron operated from RNAS Piarco (HMS Goshawk) for the remainder of the Second World War, finally disbanding there on the 10 October 1945.

== Aircraft flown ==
The squadron has flown a number of different aircraft types, including:

- Blackburn Roc Mk.1 fighter aircraft (October 1939 - August 1940, November 1940 - August 1944)
- Fairey Fulmar Mk.II reconnaissance/fighter aircraft (September 1943 - May 1945)
- Fairey Albacore Mk.I torpedo bomber (November 1943 - October 1945)
- Miles Martinet T.T.1 target tug (April 1944 - October 1945)

== Naval air stations ==
793 Naval Air Squadron operated from a number of naval air stations of the Royal Navy, both in the UK and overseas:

- Royal Naval Air Station Ford (HMS Peregrine), Sussex, (25 October 1939 - 1 October 1940)
  - Royal Air Force Warmwell, Dorset, (Detachment 14–24 August 1940)
- Royal Naval Air Station Lee-on-Solent (HMS Daedalus), Hampshire, (1 October 1940 - 12 October 1940)
- -transit- (12 October 1940 - 18 November 1940)
- Royal Naval Air Station Piarco (HMS Goshawk), Trinidad, (18 November 1940 - 10 October 1945)
- disbanded - (10 October 1945)

== Commanding officers ==
List of commanding officers of 793 Naval Air Squadron with date of appointment:

- Lieutenant(A) J.N.Gladich, RNVR, from October 1939
- Lieutenant Commander(A) K.D.R. Davis, RNVR, from November 1940
- Lieutenant Commander(A) F.C. Booth, RNVR, from June 1944
- Lieutenant Commander(A) F.B. Gardner, RNVR, from December 1944
- Lieutenant Commander(A) S.J. McDowell, RNVR, from August 1945
- disbanded - October 1945

Note: Abbreviation (A) signifies Air Branch of the RN or RNVR.
