= 746 Naval Air Squadron =

Inactive flying squadron of the Royal Navy's Fleet Air Arm

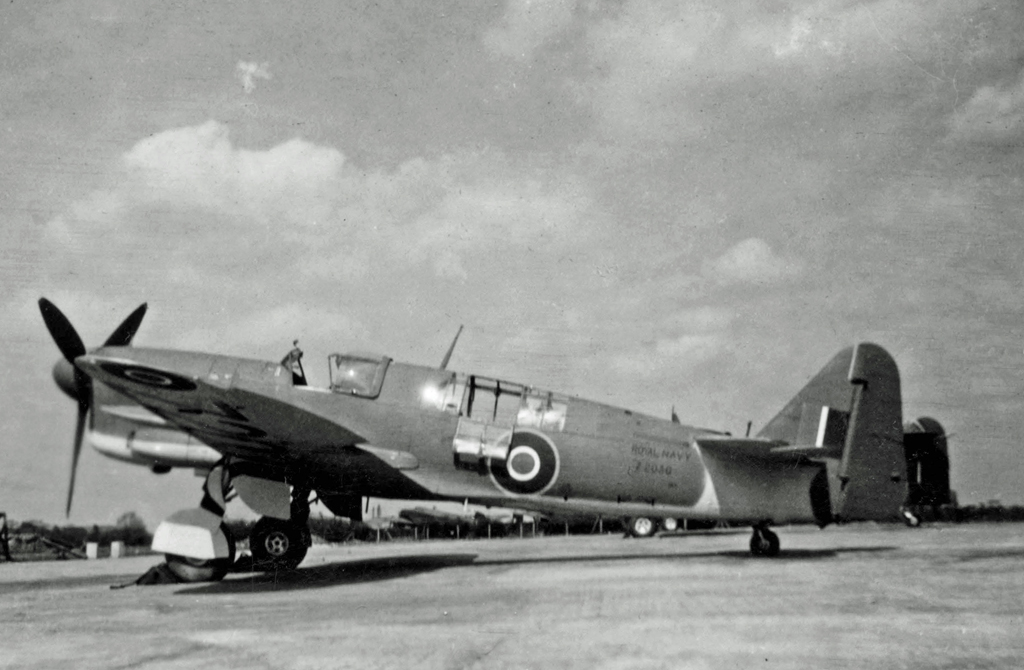
- Fairey Firefly FR.1, not dissimilar from the night fighter variant used by 746 NAS
- Active: 1942–1946
- Disbanded: 30 January 1946
- Country: United Kingdom
- Branch: Royal Navy
- Type: Fleet Air Arm Second Line Squadron
- Role: Night Fighter Interception Unit; Naval Night Fighter Development Squadron
- Size: Squadron
- Part of: Fleet Air Arm
- Home station: See Naval air stations section for full list.

Commanders
- Notable commanders: Major Leslie Alban Harris, OBE, DSC RM

Insignia
- Identification Markings: L0A+ (Fulmar at Ford & Wittering)

Aircraft flown
- Fighter: Fairey Fulmar; Fairey Firefly; Grumman Hellcat; Supermarine Seafire
- Trainer: Percival Proctor; Stinson Reliant

746 Naval Air Squadron (746 NAS), also referred to as 746 Squadron, is an inactive Fleet Air Arm (FAA) naval air squadron of the United Kingdom’s Royal Navy (RN). It was last operational as the Naval Night Fighter Development Squadron from May 1945 to January 1946, with Fairey Firefly NF.Mk II and Grumman Hellcat N.F. Mk II night fighter aircraft, supported with Stinson Reliant and Supermarine Seafire F Mk XVII. It was tasked with evaluating aircraft and their equipment, while detachments of pairs of aircraft were deployed aboard escort carriers after 'A' flight became an operational sub-unit.

It formed initially as the Naval Night Fighter Interception Unit, in November 1942 at HMS Daedalus, RNAS Lee-on-Solent, Hampshire. It moved to RN Air Section Ford, Sussex, in December to join the RAF Fighter Interception Unit. The squadron came under the control of the Naval Fighter Direction Centre at HMS Heron, RNAS Yeovilton, in 1943 and was tasked with the development of tactics and analysis of the experiences of pilots from the carrier squadrons. It moved to RAF Wittering, Cambridgeshire, in May 1944, with a detachment at RAF Defford, Worcestershire, for radar development duties. In October the squadron returned to RN Air Section Ford and in January 1945, deployed 'A' flight to HMS Sparrowhawk, RNAS Hatston, Mainland, Orkney, to provide ADDL, carrier deck landing training.

== History ==
=== Naval Night Fighter Interception Unit (1942–1945) ===
746 Naval Air Squadron formed at RNAS Lee-on-Solent (HMS Daedalus), situated near Lee-on-the-Solent in Hampshire, approximately four miles west of Portsmouth, on 23 November 1942 as a Night Fighter Interception Unit. Almost immediately, on 1 December 1942, the squadron moved to R. N. Air Section Ford, as the Admiralty had lodger facilities at RAF Ford, located at Ford, in West Sussex, England. The squadron was initially equipped with the night fighter variant of the Fairey Fulmar fighter aircraft, the NF Mk.II and its allocation of these aircraft also included the target tug variant.

Initially the unit had been formed to work alongside the RAF Fighter Interception Unit, however, later on, 746 Naval Air Squadron operated the Fairey Firefly Night Fighter version, the Firefly NF Mk. II and at this point it also started to work closely with the Naval Fighter Direction Centre at RNAS Yeovilton (HMS Heron) and tasked with developing naval night fighter tactics and use first hand experience from Naval Night Fighter Units. Some of the squadron's pilots undertook operational sorties with the RAF Fighter Interception Unit, during October 1943.

The squadron moved from RAF Ford to RAF Wittering, a Royal Air Force station within the area of Peterborough, Cambridgeshire and North Northamptonshire, on 3 April 1944, it also had a detachment of personnel at RAF Defford for radar development work. Around six months later, on 1 October 1944, it returned to RN Air Section Ford, with 'A' Flight moving to RNAS Hatston (HMS Sparrowhawk), Mainland, Orkney, Scotland.

'A' Flight then participated in a number of separate aircraft carrier deployments, during the first four months of 1945. From the 5 to the 12 January 1945, 'A' Flight from 746 NAS, was deployed on the Ruler-class escort carrier, HMS Smiter, operating with Fairey Firefly NF.II. 'A' Flight then spent two days, 25 and 26 January 1945, operating from the Attacker-class escort carrier, HMS Ravager, again with Fairey Firefly NF.II. Between 17 January and 13 February the Flight embarked in the Ruler-class escort carrier, HMS Premier and 9 February embarked in another Ruler-class, HMS Searcher.

'A' Flight spent a further week, from the 17 to the 23 February, deployed back to, HMS Premier, again operating the Firefly Night Fighter variant. March saw an approximately a two week operation, aboard HMS Searcher, for 'A' Flight. As on previous deployments, the Night Fighter mark of Fairey Firefly was used, this took place from 14 to 30 of the month. 'A' Flight returned to HMS Searcher on 5 April remaining on board, with the Firefly Night Fighter, until 13 April, including an overlap at the end of the deployment with a brief return to HMS Premier for two days, 12 and 13 April.

=== Naval Night Fighter Development Squadron (1945–1946) ===
The squadron became known as the Naval Night Fighter Development Squadron in early 1945, tasked with evaluating aircraft and equipment and after 'A' Flight became an operational sub-unit, pairs of aircraft were deployed on escort carriers. It received Grumman Hellcat N.F. Mk II, the night fighter version of the American carrier-based fighter aircraft, around this time and continued to work with the RAF Fighter Interception Development Squadron. On 23 August 1945, 746 NAS moved from RNAS Ford to RAF West Raynham, located 2 miles (3.2 km) west of West Raynham, Norfolk, working with the Central Fighter Establishment at RAF Great Massingham. The squadron assisted in carrying out development and trials on radar interception, for use in Naval aircraft. It disbanded on 30 January 1946, being absorbed by 787 Naval Air Squadron.

== Aircraft operated ==
The squadron has operated a number of different aircraft types, including:

- Fairey Fulmar NF Mk.II night fighter aircraft (November 1942 - 1943)
- Fairey Fulmar TT Mk.II target tug aircraft (November 1942 - 1943)
- Percival Proctor lA deck landing and radio trainer aircraft (November 1942 - April 1944)
- Fairey Firefly NF.Mk I night fighter aircraft (May 1943 - January 1946)
- Fairey Firefly NF.Mk II night fighter aircraft (February 1944 - January 1946)
- Stinson Reliant liaison and training aircraft (April 1944 - November 1945)
- Grumman Hellcat N.F. MkII night fighter aircraft (February 1945 - January 1946)
- Supermarine Seafire F Mk XVII fighter aircraft (December 1945)

== Naval air stations ==
746 Naval Air Squadron operated from a number of naval air station of the Royal Navy, in the United Kingdom, a number of Royal Navy escort carriers and Royal Air Force stations:

- Royal Naval Air Station Lee-on-Solent (HMS Daedalus), Hampshire, (23 November 1942 - 1 December 1942)
- RN Air Section Ford, Sussex, (1 December 1942 - 3 April 1944)
- Royal Air Force Wittering, Cambridgeshire, (3 April 1944 - 1 October 1944)
  - Royal Naval Air Station Lee-on-Solent (HMS Daedalus), Hampshire, (Detachment 24 August 1944 - 14 September 1945)
- RN Air Section Ford, Sussex, (1 October 1944 - 23 August 1945)
- Royal Air Force West Raynham, Norfolk, (23 August 1945 - 30 January 1946)
  - Royal Naval Air Station Hatston (HMS Sparrowhawk), Mainland, Orkney, (Detachment 14 September 1945)
- disbanded - (30 January 1946)

=== 746A Flight ===
746 Naval Air Squadron deployed 'A' Flight to RNAS Hatston (HMS Sparrowhawk) to provide ADDL, and pre-embarkation exercises, before embarking pairs of aircraft in a number of Royal Navy escort carriers:

- Royal Naval Air Station Hatston (HMS Sparrowhawk), Mainland, Orkney, (5 January 1945 - 10 May 1945
  - HMS Smiter (5 - 12 January 1945)
  - HMS Ravager (25 - 26 January 1945)
  - HMS Premier (17 January - 13 February 1945)
  - HMS Searcher (9 February 1945)
  - HMS Premier (17 - 23 February 1945)
  - HMS Searcher (14 - 30 March 1945)
  - HMS Premier (12 - 13 April 1945)
  - HMS Searcher (5 - 13 April 1945 / 17 - 25 April 1945)
- RN Air Section Ford, Sussex, (10 May 1945)

== Commanding officers ==
List of commanding officers of 746 Naval Air Squadron with date of appointment:

- Major L.A. Harris, OBE, DSC RM, from 23 November 1942
- Lieutenant Commander G.L. Davies, DSC RNVR, from 30 July 1945
- disbanded - 30 January 1946
