= 752 Naval Air Squadron =

Inactive flying squadron of the Royal Navy's Fleet Air Arm

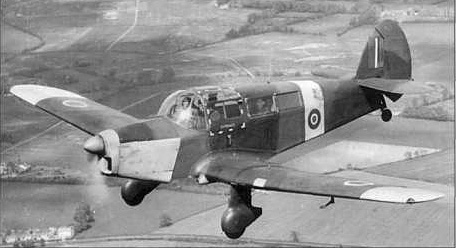
- Percival Proctor, an example of the type used by 752 NAS
- Active: 1939–1945
- Disbanded: 9 October 1945
- Country: United Kingdom
- Branch: Royal Navy
- Type: Fleet Air Arm Second Line Squadron
- Role: Observer Training Squadron
- Size: Squadron
- Part of: Fleet Air Arm
- Home station: See Naval air stations section for full list.

Insignia
- Identification Markings: W0-A+, W3A+, W3AA+ & W3AB+ (Proctor); W5A+, W5AA & W5BA (other aircraft); A+, AA+ & BA+ (Reliant)

Aircraft flown
- Attack: Fairey Albacore
- Trainer: Percival Vega Gull; Percival Proctor; Stinson Reliant

752 Naval Air Squadron (752 NAS), sometimes referred to as 752 Squadron, is an inactive Fleet Air Arm (FAA) naval air squadron of the United Kingdom’s Royal Navy (RN). It formed in May 1939, at RNAS Ford (HMS Peregrine) as an Observer Training Squadron, it was active through to 1945 as part of No. 1 Observer School. Ford was attacked in August 1940 and the squadron moved to RNAS Lee-on-Solent (HMS Daedalus) for a one month stay. From November 1940, through to disbandment in October 1945, it operated at RNAS Piarco (HMS Goshawk), Trinidad.

== History ==
=== Observer Training Squadron (1939-1945) ===
752 Naval Air Squadron formed at RNAS Ford (HMS Peregrine), located at Ford, in West Sussex, England, on 24 May 1939 as an Observer Training Squadron, part of No. 1 Observer School and operated Percival Proctor, a British radio trainer and communications aircraft, and Fairey Albacore, a single-engine biplane torpedo bomber aircraft.

On the 18 August 1940, a formation of Junkers Ju 87, or Stuka, dive bombers, attacked RNAS Ford as part of a large Luftwaffe force attacking airfields around Hampshire and Sussex. 28 personnel were killed and 75 wounded in the raid, which also destroyed 17 aircraft, damaged 26 more and caused significant infrastructure damage.

The squadron remained at RNAS Ford for around one more month, before moving to RNAS Lee-on-Solent (HMS Daedalus), situated near Lee-on-the-Solent in Hampshire, approximately 4 miles (6 km) west of Portsmouth, on 30 September 1939.

The squadron's function was the training of observers for the Fleet Air Arm. It remained part of the No. 1 Observer School, now operating out of RNAS Piarco (HMS Goshawk), an airfield located in the adjacent town of Piarco, 30 km (19 mi) east of Downtown Port of Spain, on the island of Trinidad, after moving from RNAS Lee-on-Solent on 5 November 1940. Here, as part of the school, it worked alongside two more Observer Training Squadrons: 749 Naval Air Squadron and 750 Naval Air Squadron, along with an Air Towed Target Unit, 793 Naval Air Squadron. As well as Percival Proctor and Fairey Albacore, the squadron also operated de Havilland Tiger Moth, a British biplane operated as a primary trainer aircraft, here.

In January 1941, the ocean liner and a refrigerated cargo ship, SS Almeda Star, left Liverpool carrying within its passenger complement, 142 members of the Fleet Air Arm to RNAS Piarco. They consisted of 21 officers and 121 ratings from 749 Naval Air Squadron, 750 Naval Air Squadron and 752 Naval Air Squadron. On 17 January 1941 Almeda Star was about 35 nautical miles (65 km) north of Rockall when the German submarine U-96, commanded by Kptlt Heinrich Lehmann-Willenbrock, torpedoed and sunk her. All 360 people aboard were lost.

752 Naval Air Squadron operated from RNAS Piarco for the remainder of the Second World War, eventually disbanding there on 9 October 1945.

== Aircraft operated ==
752 Naval Air Squadron operated a small number of different aircraft types, including:

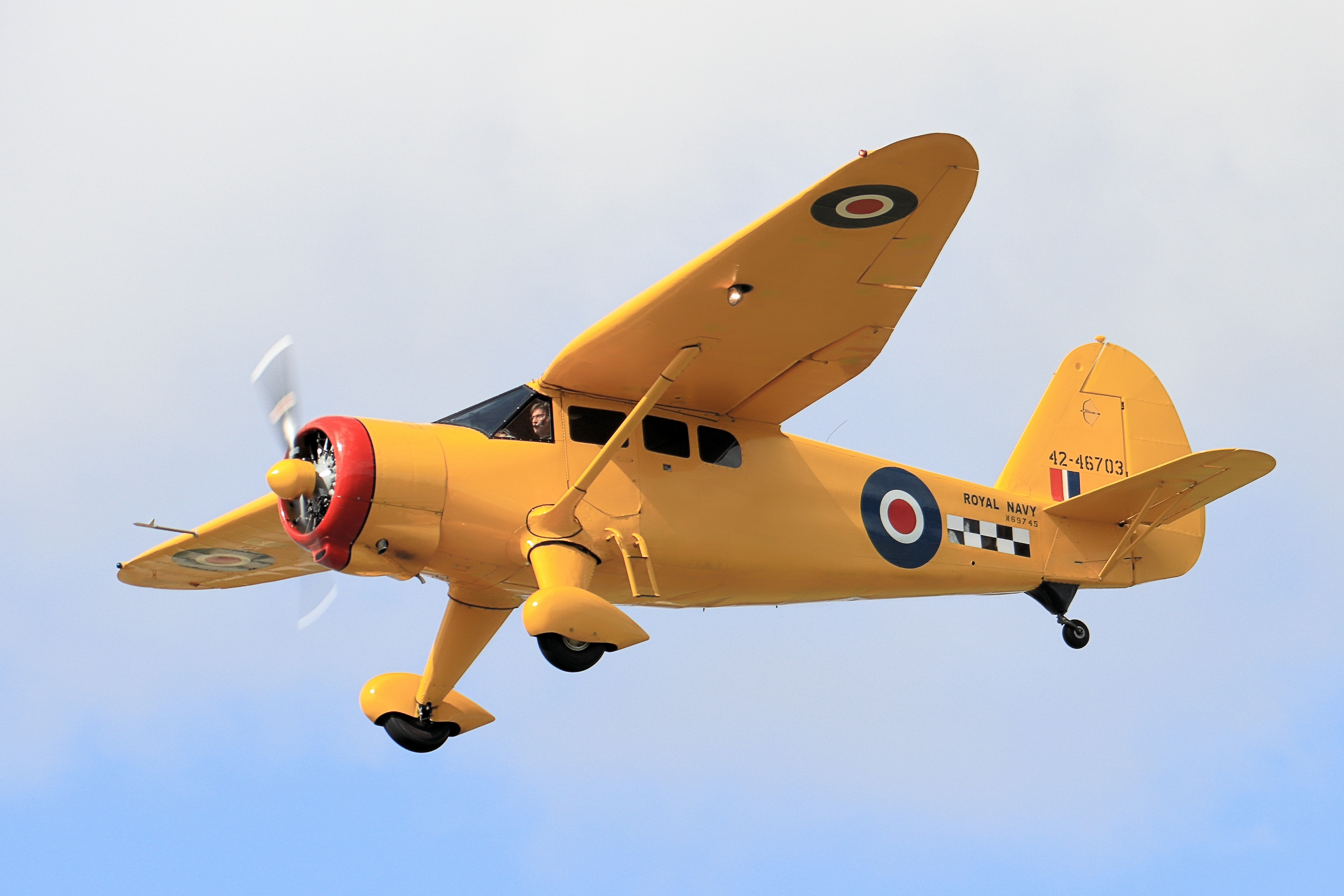
Stinson Reliant

- Percival Vega Gull trainer and communications aircraft (February 1940 - June 1940)
- Fairey Albacore torpedo bomber (1940)
- Percival Proctor IA deck landing and radio trainer (March 1940 - July 1940)
- Percival Proctor IIA radio trainer (February 1941 - June 1944)
- Percival Proctor II radio trainer (August 1942 - July 1943)
- Stinson Reliant liaison and training aircraft (February 1943 - October 1945)

== Naval air stations ==
752 Naval Air Squadron operated from a number of naval air stations of the Royal Navy, both in the UK and overseas:

- Royal Naval Air Station Ford (HMS Peregrine), Sussex, (24 May 1939 - 30 September 1939)
  - dispersal Royal Naval Air Station Yeovilton (HMS Heron), Somerset, (from May 1940)
- Royal Naval Air Station Lee-on-Solent (HMS Daedalus), Hampshire, (30 September 1940 - 12 October 1940)
  - transit (12 - 17 October 1940)
  - sailed (17 October 1940 - 5 November 1940)
- Royal Naval Air Station Piarco (HMS Goshawk), Trinidad, (5 November 1940 - 9 October 1945)
- disbanded - (9 October 1945)

== Commanding officers ==
List of commanding officers of 752 Naval Air Squadron with date of appointment:

- Lieutenant Commander G.R.F.T. Cooper RN, from 24 May 1939
- Lieutenant Commander J.H. Mc I Malcom, RNVR, from 21 February 1940
- Lieutenant Commander(A) B.A.G. Meads, RNVR, from 31 March 1941
- Lieutenant Commander(A) G.M. Tonge, RNVR, from 1 May 1943
- Lieutenant Commander(A) P.G. Lee, RNVR, 1 May 1945
- disbanded - 9 October 1945

Note: Abbreviation (A) signifies Air Branch of the RN or RNVR.
