= RNAS Ford =

Former Royal Naval Air Station in West Sussex, England

RNAS Ford HMS Peregrine RAF Ford Ford Junction
- Arundel, West Sussex in England
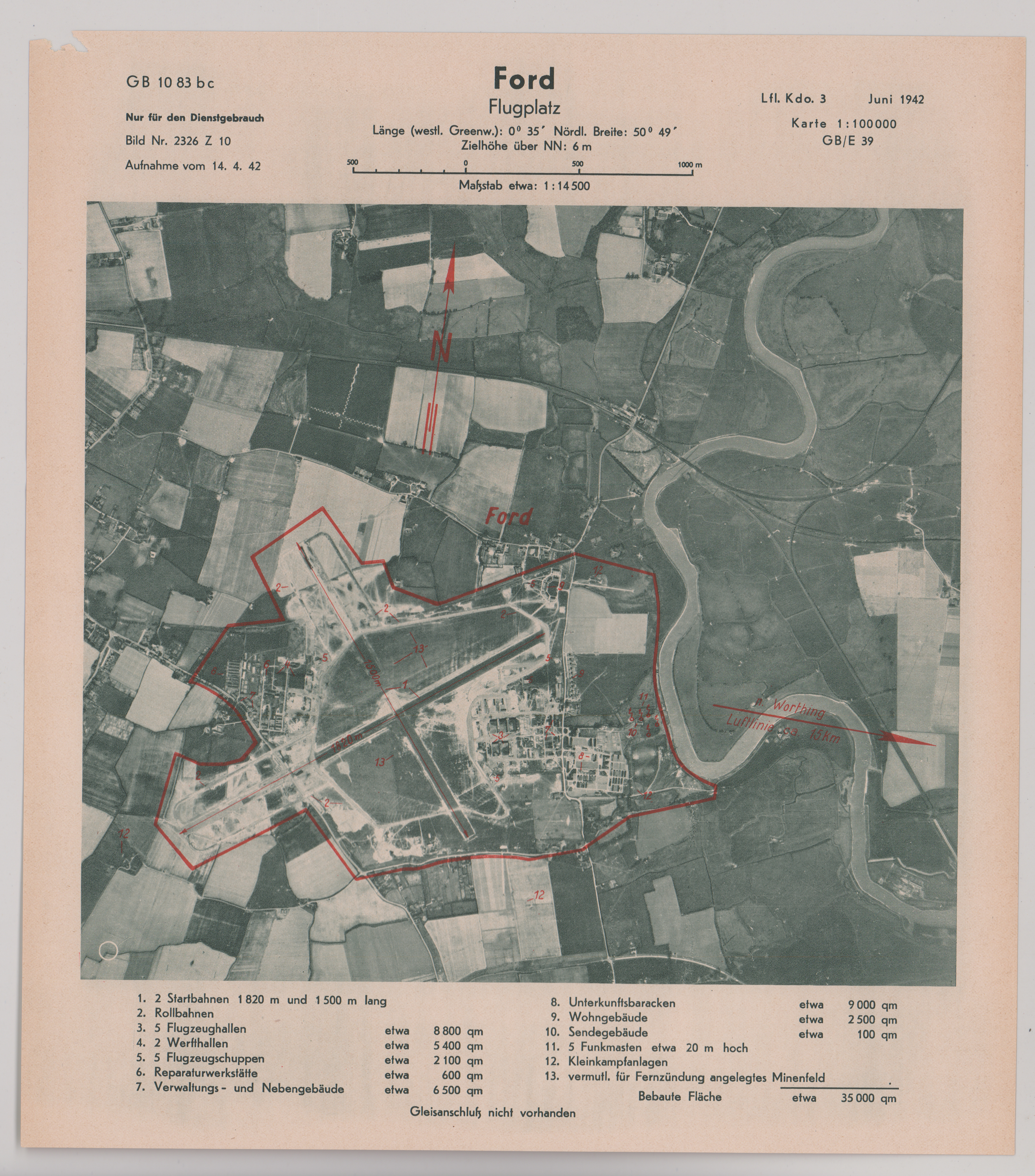
- RNAS Ford on a target dossier of the German Luftwaffe, 1942

- HMS Peregrine

Site information
- Owner: Admiralty; Air Ministry
- Operator: Royal Navy; Royal Air Force
- Controlled by: No. 17 Group RAF - 1939; Fleet Air Arm 1939 - 1940, 1945 - 1958; No. 11 Group RAF 1940 - 1945

Location
- Shown within West Sussex RNAS Ford (the United Kingdom)
- Coordinates: 50°49′02″N 000°35′25″W

Site history
- Built: 1918
- In use: 1918–1958

Airfield information
- Elevation: 20 feet (6 m) AMSL
Runways
Direction	Length and surface
07/25	2,000 yards (1,829 m) x 50 yards (46 m) Tarmac and Woodchips
06/34	1,600 yards (1,463 m) x 50 yards (46 m) Tarmac and Woodchips
- Source: Royal Navy Research Archive

Royal Naval Air Station Ford, commonly referred to as RNAS Ford; (commissioned HMS Peregrine) is a former Royal Navy Naval Air Station located at Ford, in West Sussex, England, near Arundel and Littlehampton.

Originally opened during the First World War, it later became notable during the Second World War as a base for Royal Air Force intruder squadrons operating over occupied Europe, following heavy damage sustained during the Battle of Britain. After 1945, the station returned to Fleet Air Arm use, serving as a training and operational work-up base and hosting the Royal Navy’s first jet fighter squadron in 1951. Ford was closed in November 1958 as part of post-war defence reductions.

It is currently HM Prison Ford (informally known as Ford Open Prison) which is a Category D men's prison. The prison is operated by His Majesty's Prison Service.

== History ==
=== Beginnings ===
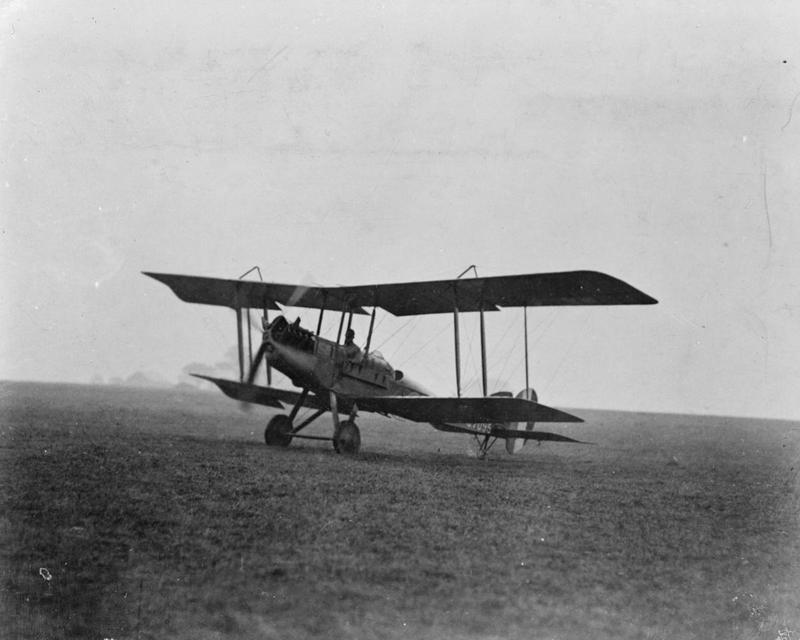
Landing in a Royal Aircraft Factory B.E.12 aircraft, Ford Aerodrome, Sussex, 1918

An 85 acres (34 ha) site adjacent to Yapton village was inaugurated as an airfield for the Royal Flying Corp (RFC) and subsequently the Royal Air Force (RAF) as well as the United States Army Air Service (USAAS) training units loo in March 1918, and it became known as Ford Junction. In 1920, the airfield was closed, and it was not until 1933 that it reopened for civil flying. In 1936, the Air Ministry took ownership of the site, and in 1937, RAF Ford was reactivated.

=== HMS Peregrine (1939–1940) ===
On 24 May 1939, as part of the Fleet Air Arm moving to the Royal Navy, four airfields were transferred from the Air Ministry to the Admiralty: RAF Donibristle, RAF Lee-on-Solent, RAF Ford, and RAF Worthy Down, the airbase became known as Royal Naval Air Station Ford and commissioned as HMS Peregrine, with Captain(A) R.de H. Burton, RN, as the initial Royal Navy commanding officer of the airbase. The RN Observer School was formed out of the disbanded School of Naval Cooperation RAF at HMS Peregrine and its aircraft were allocated across three new Fleet Air Arm Squadrons which were also formed on that day.

The three squadrons were: 750 Naval Air Squadron designated an Observer Training squadron, which was allocated with Hawker Osprey, the navalised carrier-borne version of the Hawker Hart, and Blackburn Shark, a carrier-borne torpedo bomber, 751 Naval Air Squadron, also designated an Observer Training squadron which received some Supermarine Walrus, a single-engine amphibious biplane, and a third Observer Training squadron, 752 Naval Air Squadron, which was provided with Percival Proctor, a radio trainer and communications aircraft, and Fairey Albacore a single-engine biplane torpedo bomber.

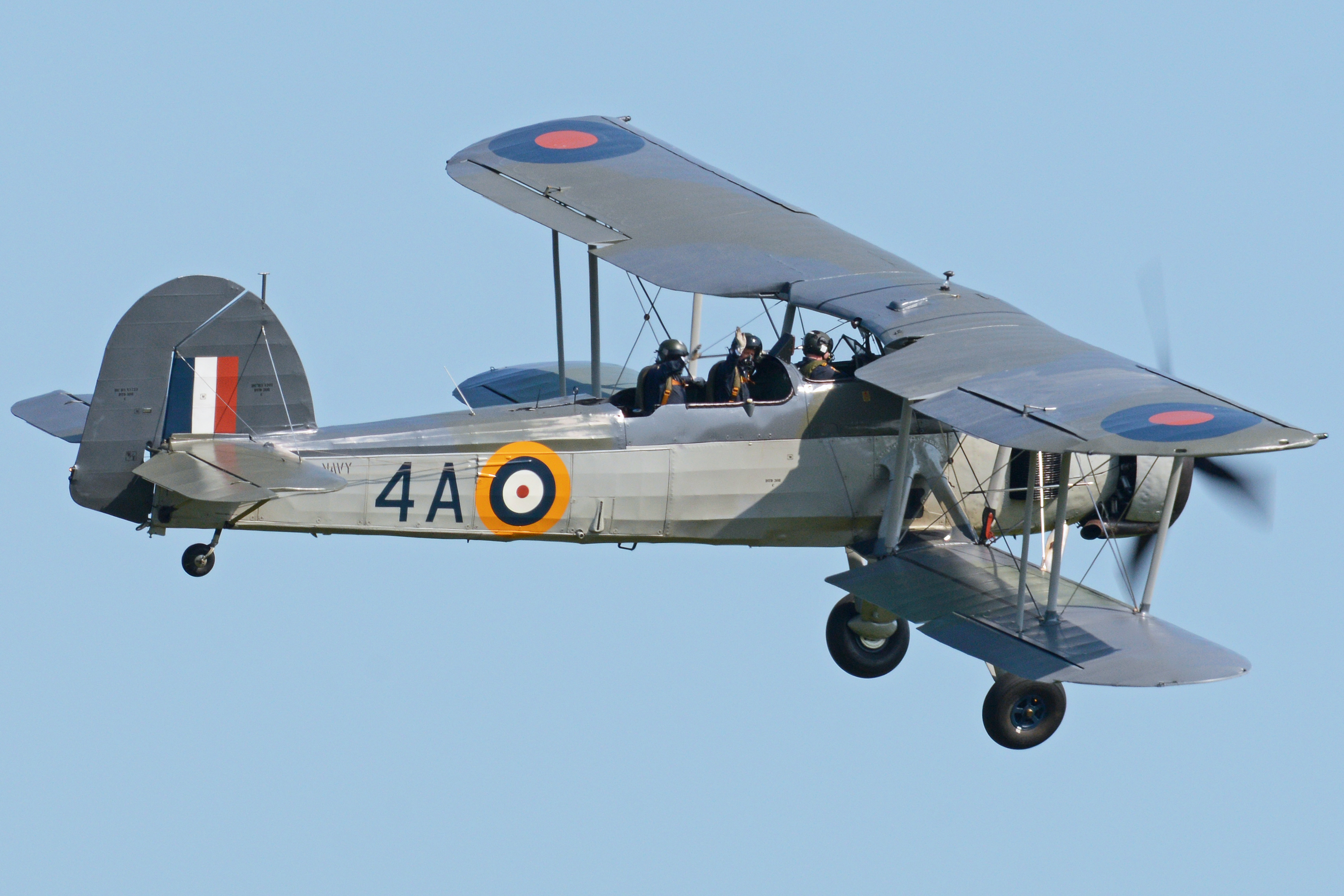
Fairey Swordfish I, in the markings of an 820 Squadron aircraft from HMS Ark Royal

In July the Fairey Swordfish equipped 820 Naval Air Squadron arrived from RAF Gosport. Two days after arriving, it embarked its biplane torpedo bombers in HMS Ark Royal and it was the single first-line squadron of the Fleet Air Arm that passed through HMS Peregrine in 1939. In the following October, the Observer School had two more squadrons stand-up with 782 Naval Air Squadron, tasked as an Armament Training Squadron, and 793 Naval Air Squadron, whose role was an Air Towed Target Unit, and was equipped with Blackburn Roc, a naval turret fighter aircraft, but 782 NAS disbanded after just three weeks and having received no aircraft.

January 1940 saw the formation of 819 Naval Air Squadron at RNAS Ford, which was a Torpedo, Spotter, and Reconnaissance Squadron, equipped with Fairey Swordfish torpedo bomber aircraft. The Fairey Swordfish equipped 821 Naval Air Squadron arrived from RNAS Lee-on-Solent (HMS Daedalus) in March, then almost immediately left for HMS Ark Royal. 819 NAS left HMS Peregrine and had a brief spell at RAF West Freugh, located in Dumfries and Galloway, Scotland, before returning during March, then moving onto RNAS Roborough (HMS Drake II), near Plymouth, Devon, at the end of May.

Around the same time 816 Naval Air Squadron arrived with Fairey Swordfish. It moved briefly to RNAS Jersey on 4 June but returned on the 11, although the airbase had already been evacuated and had closed down on 31 May, (the Germans captured the Island on 1 July). The squadron left for HMS Furious on 14 June.

During the 18 August 1940 the airbase was attacked by the Luftwaffe. It was on this day the Germans attempted to destroy a number of airfields with three air raids taking place during the afternoon comprised 850 sorties and involving 2,200 aircrew. Sturzkampfgeschwader 77, a Luftwaffe dive bomber wing, supplied a total force of 109 Junkers Ju 87 or “Stuka” dive bombers. It was the largest concentration of Ju 87 to operate over Britain to date and of those twenty-eight aircraft were assigned to attack Ford. The fatalities at the airbase comprised civilians along with army and personnel, resulting in 28 deaths and a total of 75 individuals sustained injuries, while 17 aircraft were deemed irreparable, and an additional 26 sustained damage. Two hangars were obliterated, along with approximately one-third of the accommodations for the personnel. Numerous structures were affected, including the canteens designated for ratings and Petty Officers.

With the German occupation of France during May and June 1940, the increase in the risk of an attack on HMS Peregrine due to its proximity was soon acknowledged and therefore 750, 751, and 752 Naval Air Squadrons were despersed at RNAS Yeovilton (HMS Heron) in May. The attack on the airbase caused more extreme action. 751 NAS departed for RNAS Arbroath (HMS Condor) the following day, 750 Naval Air Squadron stood down and the unit prepared to sail overseas for the island of Trinidad. 752 and 793 Naval Air Squadrons moved to RNAS Lee-on-Solent and also prepared for a move to Trinidad. All three units were to relocate to RNAS Piarco, where the RN No. 1 Observer School reformed.

The Admiralty subsequently decided to depart from Ford and return the airbase to the Air Ministry. Shortly afterwards HMS Peregrine was decommissioned’ on 30 September 1940, and the next day Ford was under the control of No. 11 Group RAF, within RAF Fighter Command, with the RN retaining rights for a lodger unit. The RN school of Photography formed from an unnumbered Flight of Blackburn Shark torpedo-spotter-reconnaissance biplane and Fairey Seal spotter-reconnaissance biplane, at RAF Ford in December 1940.

=== RAF Ford (1940–1945) ===
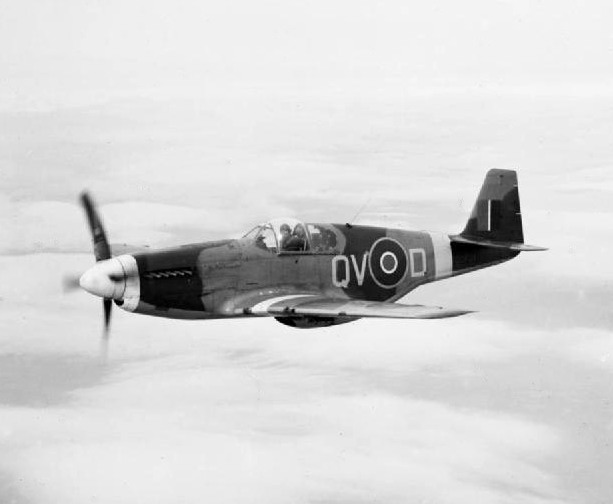
Royal Air Force North American Mustang III of No. 19 Squadron RAF based at Ford, 1944

The Air Ministry oversaw the development of the air station during the Second World War. In 1941, two tarmac runways were constructed, measuring 6,000 feet (1,800 m) in the southwest/northeast direction and 4,800 feet (1,500 m) in the northwest/southeast direction. Additionally, extensive new taxiways were established on the west side of the initial airfield. The construction included blast pens and several Blister hangars strategically placed along the perimeter track to complement the existing Bellman hangars.

Naval aviation made a resurgence at Ford at the close of 1942, marked by the transfer of the 746 Naval Air Squadron, a Night Fighter Interception Unit, from RNAS Lee-on-Solent (HMS Daedalus), on 1 December. This unit collaborated with the RAF Fighter Interception Unit at Ford until its subsequent relocation to RAF Wittering, Cambridgeshire, on 3 April 1944. The squadron made its return on 1 October, as a component of the newly established Night Fighter Development Wing, which was formed on 16 of that month.

By early 1945, this unit had become the primary operational force at RAF Ford, continuing its activities until the gradual decommissioning that followed the end of World War II in Europe. On 31 July RAF Ford was no longer classified as a No. 11 Group station and was subsequently reassigned to the Admiralty.

=== Recommissioned as HMS Peregrine (1945–1948) ===
RNAS Ford was re-commissioned as HMS Peregrine in August 1945. At that point, 746 Naval Air Squadron, the Night Fighter Interception Unit, was still stationed here, however, it relocated to RAF West Raynham on the 23 of the same month. Additionally, on 1 August, the long-established RN Photographic Flight was elevated to squadron status, resulting in the formation of the 720 RN Photographic Squadron at this location.

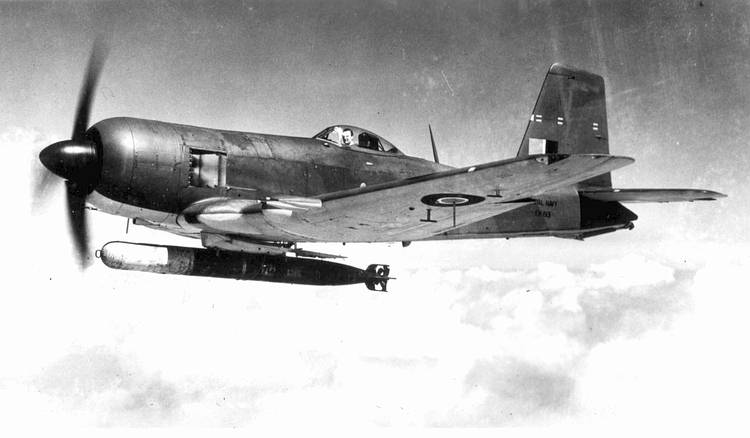
Blackburn Firebrand TF Mk. IV

On 1 September 813 Naval Air Squadron was reestablished as a Torpedo Strike Squadron, utilising Blackburn Firebrand TF.IV aircraft. Shortly thereafter, on 6 September, 708 Naval Air Squadron, designated as the Firebrand Tactical Trials Unit, arrived at the airbase from RNAS Gosport (HMS Siskin), equipped with Blackburn Firebrand TF.III. The CO and a number of pilots from this unit became the core of 813 Naval Air Squadron, as they possessed the most extensive experience with the Firebrand, having previously addressed numerous issues associated with this aircraft model.

On 15 September, 811 Naval Air Squadron was reformed at RNAS Ford as a two-seat fighter squadron, utilising de Havilland Mosquito FB.VI fighter-bomber aircraft. A detachment from 771 Naval Air Squadron, a Fleet Requirements Unit, arrived at RNAS Ford on 20 September, having traveled from RNAS Gosport equipped with several de Havilland Mosquito B.23 bomber aircraft. Additionally, 708 Naval Air Squadron made its departure in December, transferring to RNAS Fearn (HMS Owl) on the 5th.

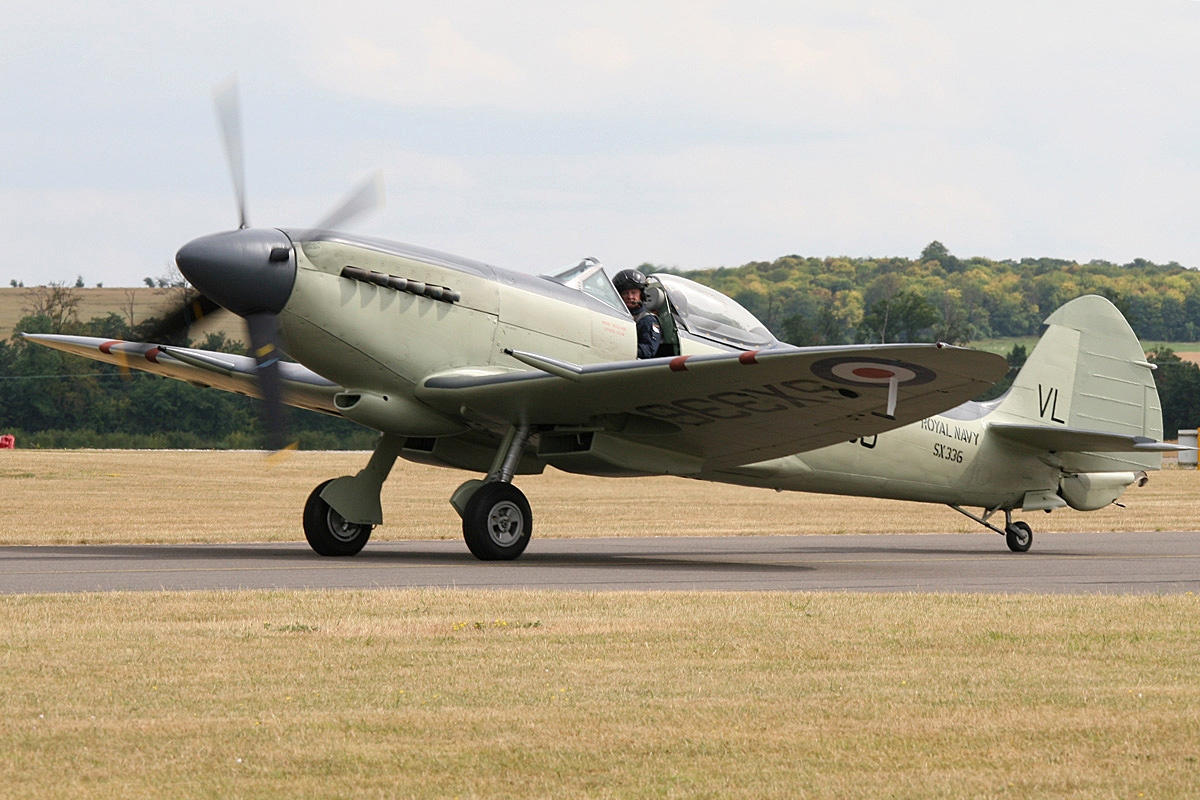
Supermarine Seafire F Mk.17

The beginning of 1946 saw the arrival of another second line squadron at RNAS Ford, specifically 778 Naval Air Squadron, which functioned as a Service Trials Unit. This unit arrived on 3 January from RNAS Gosport and was equipped with Fairey Barracuda torpedo and dive bomber Mk II, Mk III, and TR V variants, as well as Supermarine Seafire fighter aircraft variants including the F Mk.XV, F Mk.17, F Mk.46, and F Mk.47 types.

Serviceability issues with its Blackburn Firebrand, prevented 813 Naval Air Squadron from achieving operational status and it was subsequently disbanded at RNAS Ford on 30 September 1946, pending the introduction of the improved TF.5 variant. Following a period of acclimatisation with their new aircraft, 811 Naval Air Squadron relocated to RNAS Brawdy (HMS Goldcrest) on 6 December 1946.

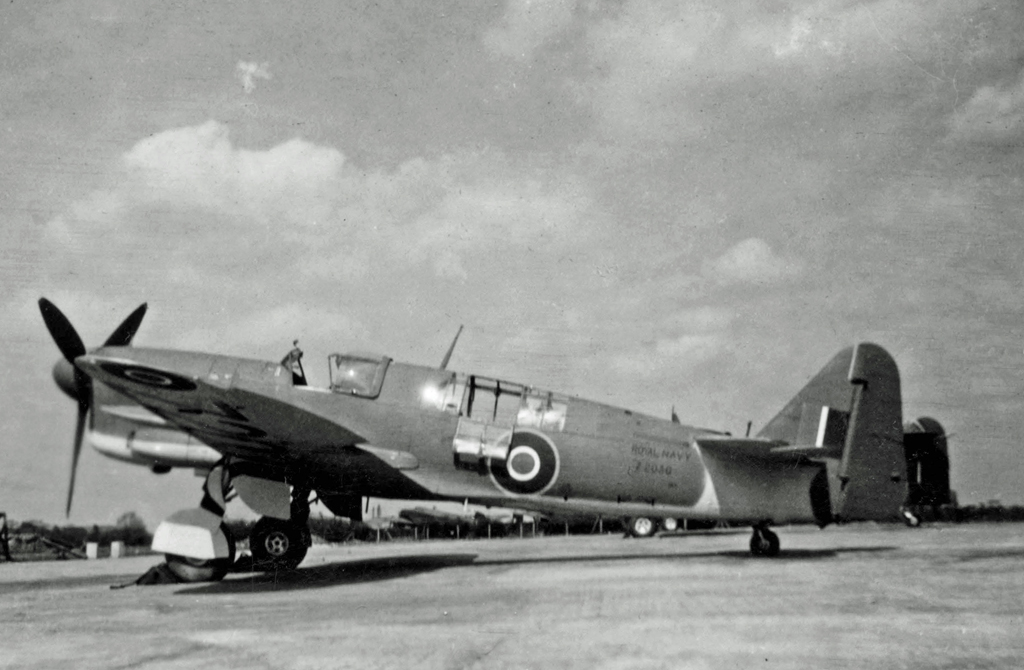
Fairey Firefly FR.1

The subsequent arrival at the station was 795 Naval Air Squadron, a Refresher Training Squadron, which flew its Fairey Firefly FR.I aircraft from the lead ship of her class, HMS Implacable, on 24 March 1947. The squadron was disbanded on the same day. 813 Naval Air Squadron was reestablished at RNAS Ford on 1 May 1947 with TF.5 variant of the Blackburn Firebrand and following a period of preparation was deployed aboard HMS Implacable. Additionally, the Service Trials Unit, 778 Naval Air Squadron, relocated to RAF Tangmere on 18 July 1947.

On 20 December 1947, the 14th Carrier Air Group (CAG), consisting of 804 and 812 Naval Air Squadrons, disembarked from the Colossus-class aircraft carrier, HMS Theseus, upon her return from a deployment in the Far East. The Supermarine Seafire FR Mk.47 fighter aircraft of 804 Naval Air Squadron proceeded to RNAS Eglinton (HMS Gannet), Northern Ireland, on the same day, but the Fairey Firefly FR.I of 812 Naval Air Squadron continued to be stationed at Ford. 804 Naval Air Squadron returned from RNAS Eglinton on 11 January 1948, prior to the CAG's transfer to RNAS Donibristle (HMS Merlin) on 6 April.

812 Naval Air Squadron returned to RNAS Ford on 13 April, followed by 804 Naval Air Squadron on 18 April. Subsequently, 14 CAG left for RNAS Eglinton on 26 May. The following day, 720 Naval Air Squadron moved to Gosport, and Ford ceased flying operations as the station was set to undergo a significant refurbishment program aimed at expediting completion.

=== On the books of Daedalus (1948–1950) ===
HMS Peregrine was decommissioned on 30 June 1948, at which point its accounts were transferred to the records of HMS Daedalus, while a major refurbishment took place with operations under the supervision of Commander J.F.R. Crewes, GM, RN. The undertaken projects encompassed the resurfacing of runways and taxiways, the installation of a substantial concrete hard-standing, and the construction of three new hangars. Additionally, the technical and domestic areas underwent a thorough cleanup and partial reconstruction.

=== Third commission as HMS Peregrine (1950-1958) ===
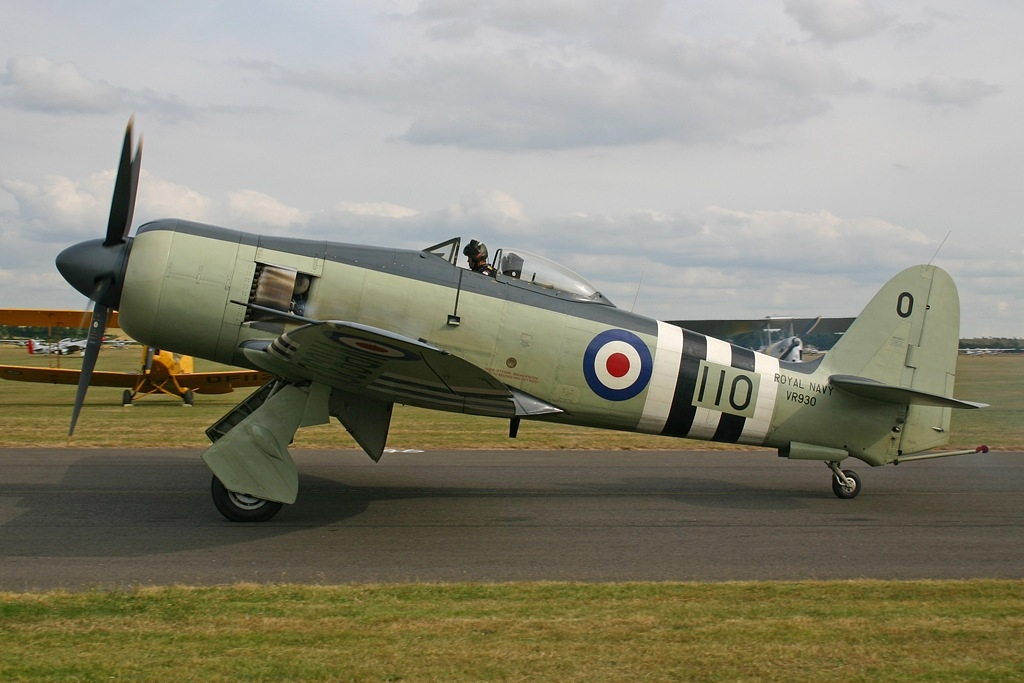
Hawker Sea Fury FB.11; and example of the type used by 807 Squadron

On 1 February 1950, RNAS Ford recommissioned as HMS Peregrine the commanding officer was Captain H.C.P. Sears, RN. Flying operations resumed the following month. The first unit to be based at the station was 703 Naval Air Squadron, a Service Trials Unit, which flew in on 19 April after relocating from RNAS Lee-on-Solent, it bought with it a representative range of front-line aircraft then in service.

On 15 June, the 17th Carrier Air Group arrived at the station. The Hawker Sea Fury FB.11 aircraft of 807 Naval Air Squadron transferred from RNAS Culdrose, while the Fairey Firefly AS.5 anti-submarine aircraft of 810 Naval Air Squadron flew from HMS Theseus. These were the only front-line squadrons at RNAS Ford, and the carrier air group subsequently re-embarked in HMS Theseus on 16 August. Later in the year, on 15 November, 827 Naval Air Squadron disembarked its Fairey Firefly FR.1 aircraft from the aircraft carrier HMS Triumph before disbanding on 22 November.

On 15 May 1951, 826 Naval Air Squadron reformed at RNAS Ford and was equipped with Fairey Firefly AS.6 anti-submarine aircraft. Following a period of work-up, the squadron left for HMS Illustrious on 1 June for deck landing training, arriving back at RNAS Ford on 24 October. At the conclusion of June 1951, the station also became the home of 1840 Naval Air Squadron, a Royal Naval Volunteer Reserve air squadron, which was an anti-submarine unit equipped with six Fairey Firefly FR.4 aircraft and two North American Harvard T.2b advanced trainers.

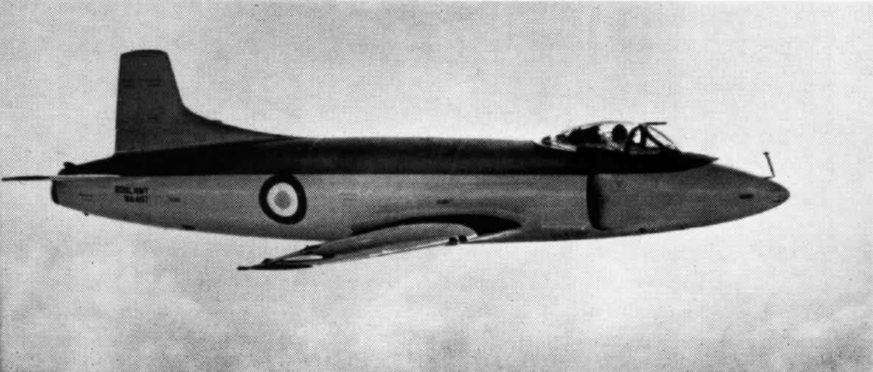
Supermarine Attacker

RNAS Ford transitioned into the jet age in August 1951 with the formation of two jet aircraft squadrons intended for deployment with HMS Eagle. 800 Naval Air Squadron reformed at the station on 21 August, receiving eight Supermarine Attacker FB.1 aircraft. It was followed by 803 Naval Air Squadron, which reformed on 26 November, also equipped with eight Supermarine Attacker FB.1s. Both squadrons formed part of the 13th Carrier Air Group and undertook work-up at RNAS Ford in preparation for embarkation in HMS Eagle.

On 17 January 1952, 826 Naval Air Squadron departed to embark in HMS Indomitable. It was soon replaced by a third Supermarine Attacker unit: 890 Naval Air Squadron, which reformed at RNAS Ford on 30 January as a fighter pool squadron. The unit formally commissioned on 22 April upon receiving eight Supermarine Attacker FB.1 aircraft, its role being to provide pilots and aircraft as replacements for 800 and 803 Squadrons as required. The next Squadron to arrive at RNAS Ford was 814 Naval Air Squadron, which transferred its Fairey Firefly AS.6 aircraft from RNAS Lee-on-Solent on 8 May 1952, before flying to RNAS Machrihanish on 14 May.

On 1 June 1952, the Royal Naval Volunteer Reserve (RNVR) Air Branch was reorganised into five divisions: Scottish, Northern, Midland, Southern, and Channel. The Channel Air Division was established at RNAS Ford, originally consisting solely of 1840 Squadron.

803 Naval Air Squadron embarked its Supermarine Attacker aircraft in HMS Eagle on 4 June 1952, followed three days later by 800 Squadron. During the same month, two further anti-submarine warfare squadrons stopped briefly at RNAS Ford. 815 Naval Air Squadron came from RNAS Eglinton on 16 June with Fairey Barracuda TR.3 aircraft, flying back to Northern Ireland on 26 June. 821 Naval Air Squadron came from RNAS Machrihanish on 20 June with Fairey Firefly FR.5 aircraft, but departed on 23 June.

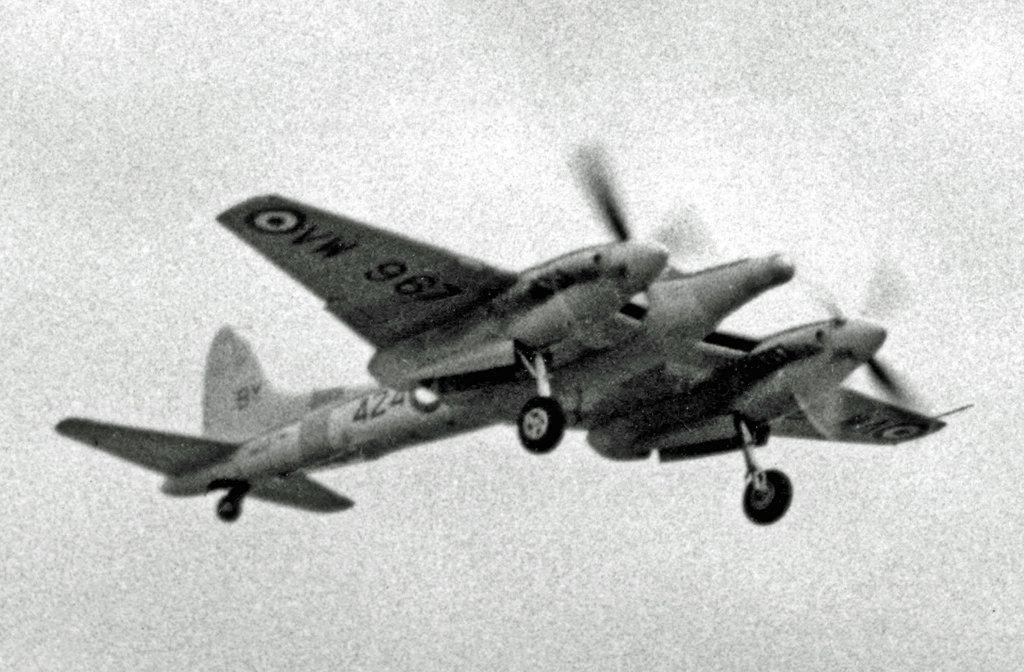
de Havilland Sea Hornet NF.21

800 Squadron returned to RNAS Ford on 19 July after disembarking from HMS Eagle. On 1 September 1952, 771 Naval Air Squadron, a Fleet Requirements Unit, transferred from RNAS Lee-on-Solent, it bought with it a diverse range of aircraft, including variants of the de Havilland Mosquito, de Havilland Sea Mosquito, de Havilland Sea Hornet, Gloster Meteor, de Havilland Sea Vampire, Short Sturgeon, Fairey Firefly, and Westland Dragonfly helicopter.

A second RNVR unit, 1840A Naval Air Squadron, was commissioned at RNAS Ford on 1 October 1952 as an offshoot of 1840 Squadron. Both units operated as anti-submarine warfare squadrons and shared a common pool of aircraft, primarily Fairey Firefly AS.6s along together with a limited quantity of training aircraft.

The Supermarine Attacker squadrons of HMS Eagle began returning to RNAS Ford later that month, with 803 Squadron disembarking on 9 October, followed by 800 Squadron on 11 October. 890 Naval Air Squadron, the fighter pool unit, relocated to RNAS Milltown, Moray, on 27 October, leaving 800 and 803 Squadrons as the principal jet units at the station. These squadrons re-embarked in HMS Eagle on 7 November, returning to RNAS Ford on 3 December 1952. Upon their return, the 13th Carrier Air Group was disbanded, although the two squadrons continued to be assigned to HMS Eagle. Thereafter, they adopted a routine of alternating one month embarked and one month ashore, a pattern that continued until early 1954.

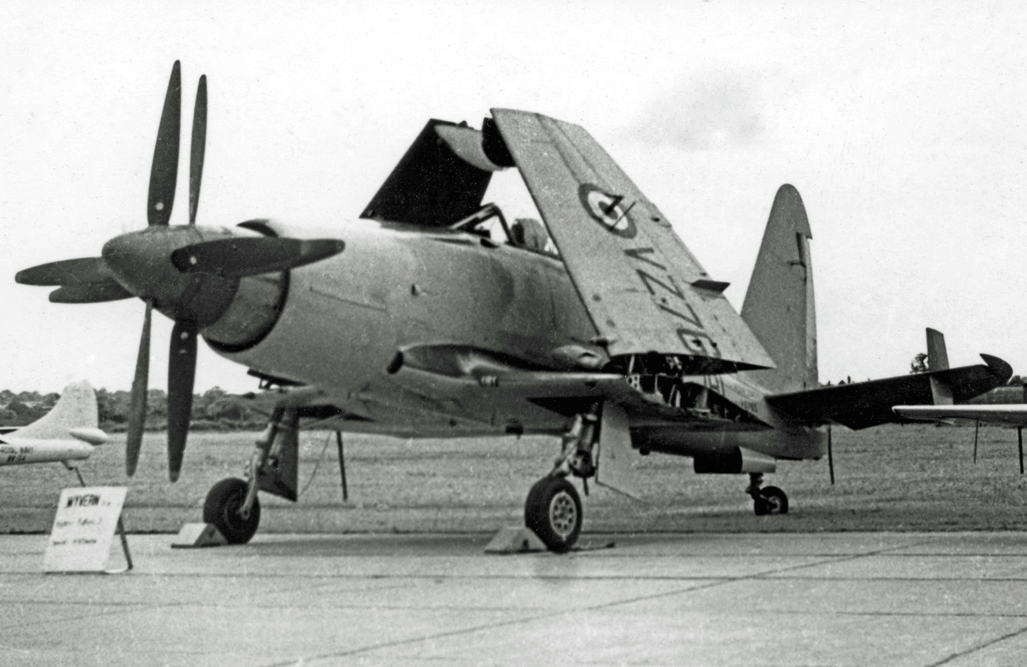
Westland Wyvern S.4 of 813 Squadron

In January 1953, the Fairey Firefly AS.6 aircraft of 812 Naval Air Squadron, an anti-submarine warfare squadron, flew from RNAS Eglinton en route to embark aboard the light fleet carrier HMS Theseus, joining the carrier on 21 January. The following month, 813 Naval Air Squadron, then operating as a torpedo strike unit, equipped with Westland Wyvern S.4 strike aircraft, relocated from RNAS Lee-on-Solent, on 18 February. On 28 March 1953, 1840A Royal Naval Volunteer Reserve Air Squadron was recommissioned as 1842 Royal Naval Volunteer Reserve Air Squadron.

On 1 March 1954, 810 Naval Air Squadron reformed at RNAS Ford as a single-seat fighter unit equipped with Hawker Sea Fury FB.11 fighter-bomber, preparing for service aboard the name ship of her class HMS Centaur. The squadron moved to the aircraft carrier on 20 July following a period of training. On 15 March, 703X Flight was established as the Gannet Intensive Trial Unit (ITU), to evaluate the new Fairey Gannet AS.1 anti-submarine warfare aircraft, prior to operational deployment. This unit completed its trials before the end of 1954 and was disbanded on 21 December. During this time, RNAS Ford increasingly became a base for training and experimental units. Although 815 Naval Air Squadron, an anti-submarine warfare squadron, arrived in June 1954 with Grumman Avenger anti-submarine warfare aircraft, it undertook multiple relocations between RNAS Ford, RNAS Eglinton, and other stations before ultimately transferring to RNAS Culdrose in November. A temporary Westland Wyvern holding Flight, 703W, was established at RNAS Ford in October 1954 but disbanded shortly thereafter on 1 November, its aircraft being absorbed into the newly formed 827 Naval Air Squadron.

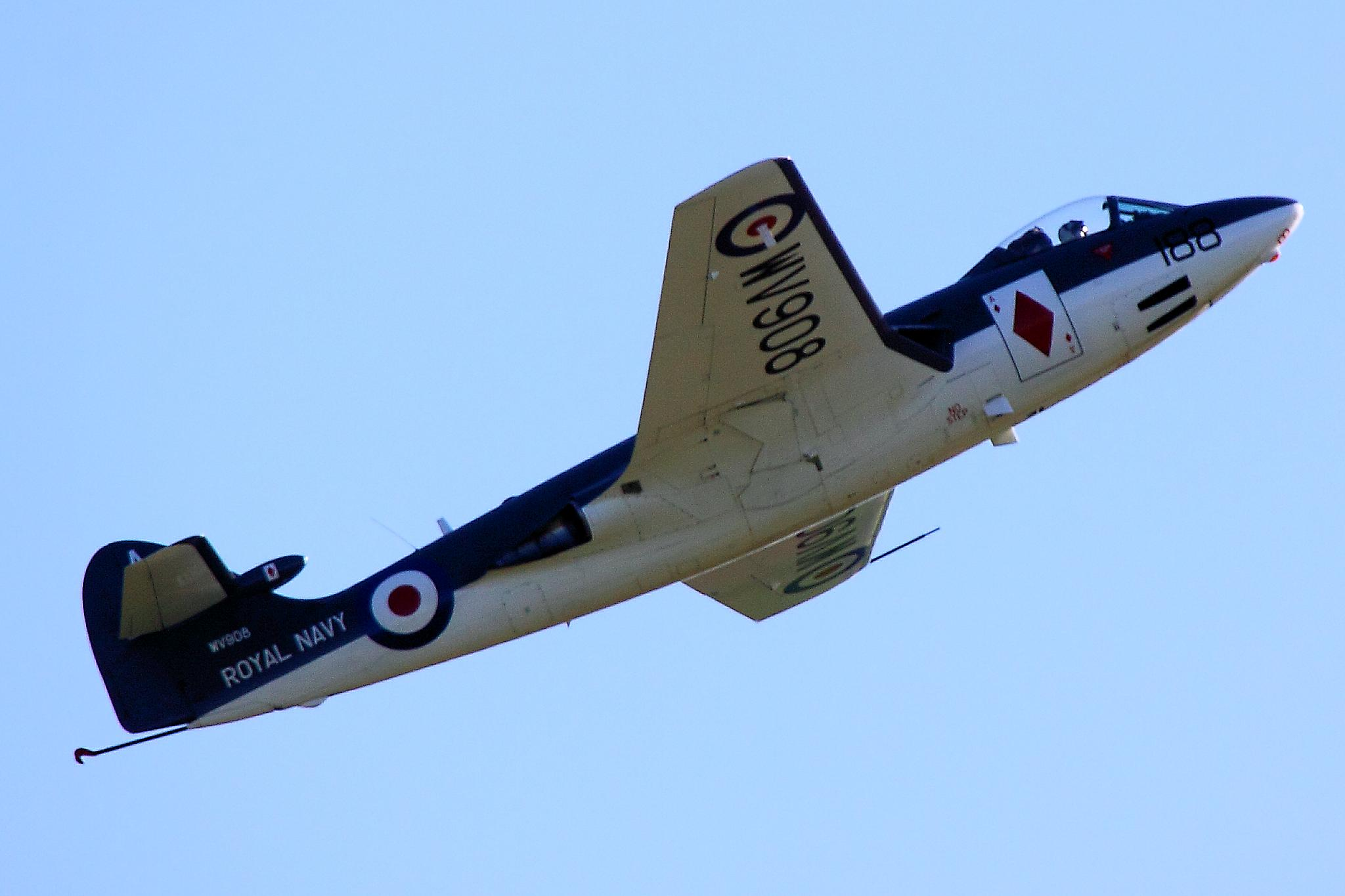
Hawker Sea Hawk

A major reorganisation took place in 1955 to align with evolving Fleet Air Arm requirements. On 1 February, 764 Naval Air Squadron was reformed at RNAS Ford as a Fighter Pilot Holding Unit or Jet Fighter Pilot Pool, providing instruction on modern aircraft types including the Hawker Sea Hawk, de Havilland Sea Vampire, and Westland Wyvern. On 17 August, 703 Squadron, the Service Trials Unit (STU) and 771 Squadron, the Fleet Requirements Unit (FRU) were disbanded. These units were merged to form 700 Naval Air Squadron as a Trials and Requirements Unit, which operated a diverse range of aircraft including Avro Anson, Fairey Firefly TT.4, de Havilland Sea Vampire, Hawker Sea Hawk, Westland Wyvern, and Fairey Gannet. Two new front-line torpedo strike squadrons, 830 and 831 Squadrons, were reformed on 21 November 1955, both equipped with Westland Wyvern S.4 strike aircraft.

In early 1956, several squadrons passed through RNAS Ford en route to carrier deployments, including 897 Naval Air Squadron with Hawker Sea Hawk FB.3 embarking aboard HMS Bulwark. The year also saw continued involvement with Royal Naval Volunteer Reserve (RNVR) training. During the summer, RNVR fighter squadrons 1832 and 1833 conducted annual training detachments at RNAS Ford, operating Supermarine Attacker FB.2 aircraft. On 1 March 1956, 767 Naval Air Squadron reformed as a Sea Hawk pilot pool unit, maintaining a reserve of trained pilots for front-line service. However, it relocated to RNAS Brawdy in August. Meanwhile, 830 Squadron embarked aboard HMS Eagle in April, while 831 Squadron remained at RNAS Ford for most of the year, with occasional detachments.

In 1957, RNAS Ford’s operational role diminished significantly. At the start of the year, 831 Squadron was the only resident front-line unit, operating intermittently from the Audacious-class aircraft carrier HMS Ark Royal. On March 10, 1957, the RNVR Air Branch along with the Channel Air Division was dissolved due to reductions in defence expenditures. Shortly thereafter, 820 Naval Air Squadron, an anti-submarine warfare squadron, flew in from RNAS Eglinton for service aboard the light aircraft carrier HMS Bulwark.

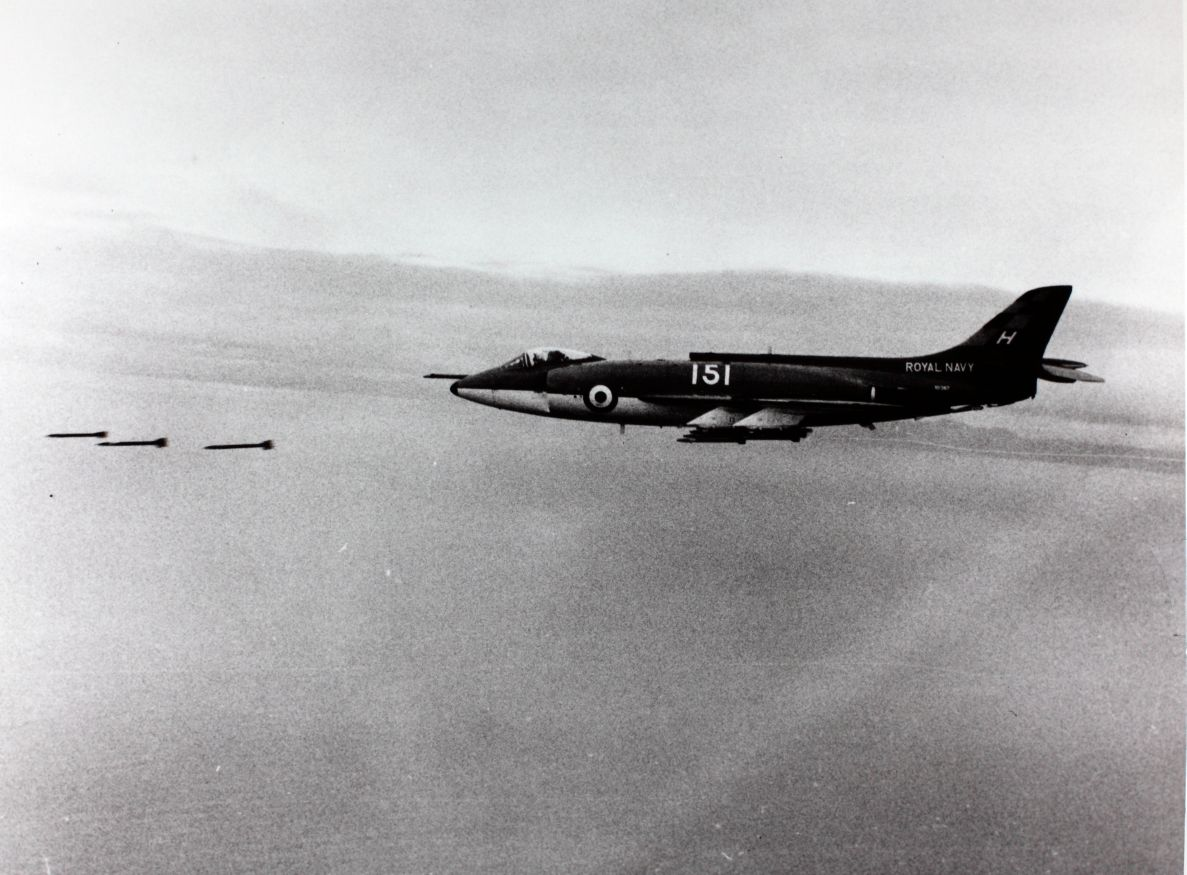
Supermarine Scimitar

Subsequent reductions occurred. In June, 764 Squadron moved to RNAS Lossiemouth, resulting in RNAS Ford retaining only three operational units: 700 Naval Air Squadron, the Trials and Requirements Unit and the front-line squadrons 820 and 831 when stationed on land. By the end of 1957, these units had either left or been disbanded. 820 Naval Air Squadron was disbanded on 5 December, while 831 Naval Air Squadron was disbanded upon its return to RNAS Ford on 10 December. At this stage, the station was solely occupied by second-line and training units.

In 1958, the British government designated RNAS Ford for closure as part of its defense estimates, leading to a gradual reduction in operations at the facility. Throughout this time, the remaining units were systematically disbanded or moved to other locations. 700X Flight, which had been engaged in trials with the Supermarine Scimitar, concluded its program and was disbanded in May 1958. Subsequently, on 11 August, 702 Squadron was also disbanded. The final operational unit at Ford, 700 Squadron, departed for RNAS Yeovilton on 19 September 1958 and with its departure, all naval flying activities at Ford ceased.

It closed to flying on 21 September and HMS Peregrine was officially 'paid off' on 13 November. This marked the formal end of Royal Navy use of the air station. The station closed on 15 December 1958.

== Previous units ==
List of past flying units and major non-flying units permanently based at Ford

The following units were here at some point:

- No. 10 Squadron RAF
- No. 16 Squadron RAF
- No. 22 Squadron RAF
- No. 23 Squadron RAF
- No. 29 Squadron RAF
- No. 88 (Hong Kong) Squadron RAF
- No. 96 Squadron RAF
- No. 97 (Straits Settlements) Squadron RAF
- No. 107 Squadron RAF
- No. 115 Squadron RAF
- No. 127 Squadron RAF
- No. 141 Squadron RAF
- No. 144 Squadron RAF
- No. 148 Squadron RAF
- No. 149 (East India) Squadron RAF
- No. 170 Squadron RAF
- No. 174 (Mauritius) Squadron RAF
- No. 215 Squadron RAF
- No. 256 Squadron RAF
- No. 287 Squadron RAF
- No. 288 Squadron RAF
- No. 418 Squadron RCAF
- No. 456 Squadron RAAF
- No. 604 (County of Middlesex) Squadron AAF
- No. 605 (County of Warwick) Squadron AAF
- No. 611 (West Lancashire) Squadron AAF

Naval units

- 700 Naval Air Squadron
  - 700X Flight
- 702 Naval Air Squadron
- 703 Naval Air Squadron
  - 703A Flight
  - 703W Flight
  - 703X Flight
- 708 Naval Air Squadron
- 720 Naval Air Squadron
- 745 Naval Air Squadron
- 746 Naval Air Squadron
- 750 Naval Air Squadron
- 751 Naval Air Squadron
- 752 Naval Air Squadron
- 762 Naval Air Squadron
- 764 Naval Air Squadron
- 767 Naval Air Squadron
- 771 Naval Air Squadron
- 778 Naval Air Squadron
- 781 Naval Air Squadron
- 782 Naval Air Squadron
- 787 Naval Air Squadron
- 793 Naval Air Squadron
- 800 Naval Air Squadron
- 801 Naval Air Squadron
- 802 Naval Air Squadron
- 803 Naval Air Squadron
- 804 Naval Air Squadron
- 806 Naval Air Squadron
- 807 Naval Air Squadron
- 809 Naval Air Squadron
- 810 Naval Air Squadron
- 811 Naval Air Squadron
- 812 Naval Air Squadron
- 813 Naval Air Squadron
- 814 Naval Air Squadron
- 815 Naval Air Squadron
- 816 Naval Air Squadron
- 818 Naval Air Squadron
- 819 Naval Air Squadron
- 820 Naval Air Squadron
- 821 Naval Air Squadron
- 824 Naval Air Squadron
- 825 Naval Air Squadron
- 826 Naval Air Squadron
- 827 Naval Air Squadron
- 829 Naval Air Squadron
- 830 Naval Air Squadron
- 831 Naval Air Squadron
- 890 Naval Air Squadron
- 895 Naval Air Squadron
- 897 Naval Air Squadron
- 1832 Naval Air Squadron
- 1833 Naval Air Squadron
- 1840 Naval Air Squadron
  - 1840A Naval Air Squadron
- 1841 Naval Air Squadron
- 1842 Naval Air Squadron

Units

- No. 8 Fighter Command Servicing Unit
- No. 11 Group Target Towing Flight RAF
- 14th Carrier Air Group
- No. 15 (Fighter) Wing RAF
- 18th (Training) Wing
- No. 50 Training Squadron
- No. 122 Airfield Headquarters RAF became No. 122 (Rocket Projectile) Wing RAF
  - No. 19 Squadron RAF
  - No. 65 (East India) Squadron RAF
  - No. 122 (Bombay) Squadron RAF
- No. 125 Airfield Headquarters RAF became No. 125 (Fighter) Wing RAF
  - No. 132 (City of Bombay) Squadron RAF
  - No. 453 Squadron RAAF
  - No. 602 (City of Glasgow) Squadron AAF
- No. 131 (Polish) (Fighter) Wing RAF
  - No. 302 Polish Fighter Squadron
  - No. 308 Polish Fighter Squadron
  - No. 317 Polish Fighter Squadron
- No. 132 (Norwegian) (Fighter) Wing RAF
  - No. 66 Squadron RAF
  - No. 331 (Norwegian) Squadron RAF
  - No. 332 (Norwegian) Squadron RAF
- No. 133 (Polish) (Fighter) Wing RAF
  - No. 129 (Mysore) Squadron RAF
  - No. 306 Polish Fighter Squadron
  - No. 315 Polish Fighter Squadron
- No. 144 (RCAF) (Fighter) Wing RAF
  - No. 441 Squadron RCAF
  - No. 442 Squadron RCAF
  - No. 443 Squadron RCAF
- No. 161 Gliding School RAF
- No. 1488 (Fighter) Gunnery Flight

== Current use ==
The site is now HM Prison Ford. In 1960, it was transformed into an open prison. The facility continues to preserve the original billets from the initial Fleet Air Arm base, which primarily constitute the living quarters for inmates.

== Commanding Officer ==
Note: The ranks shown are the ranks held at the time of holding the appointment of commanding officer, Royal Naval Air Station Ford.

- Captain(A) R.de H. Burton, RN, from 24 May 1939
- Captain A.M. McKillop, RN, from 15 August 1945
- Captain J.D. Luce, DSO, OBE, RN, from 29 September 1946
- Commander J.F.R. Crewes, GM, RN, from March 1948
- Captain H.C.P. Sears, RN, from 16 January 1950
- Captain J.C. Cockburn, RN, from 24 November 1951
- Captain JL.E.D. Walthal, DSC, RN, from 16 November 1953
- Captain(P) A.H. Abrams, DSC, RN, from 5 June 1957

Note: Abbreviation (A) signifies Air Branch of the RN or RNVR.
