= 720 Naval Air Squadron =

Inactive flying squadron of the Royal Navy's Fleet Air Arm

720 Naval Air Squadron ~~720 (Catapult) Flight FAA~~
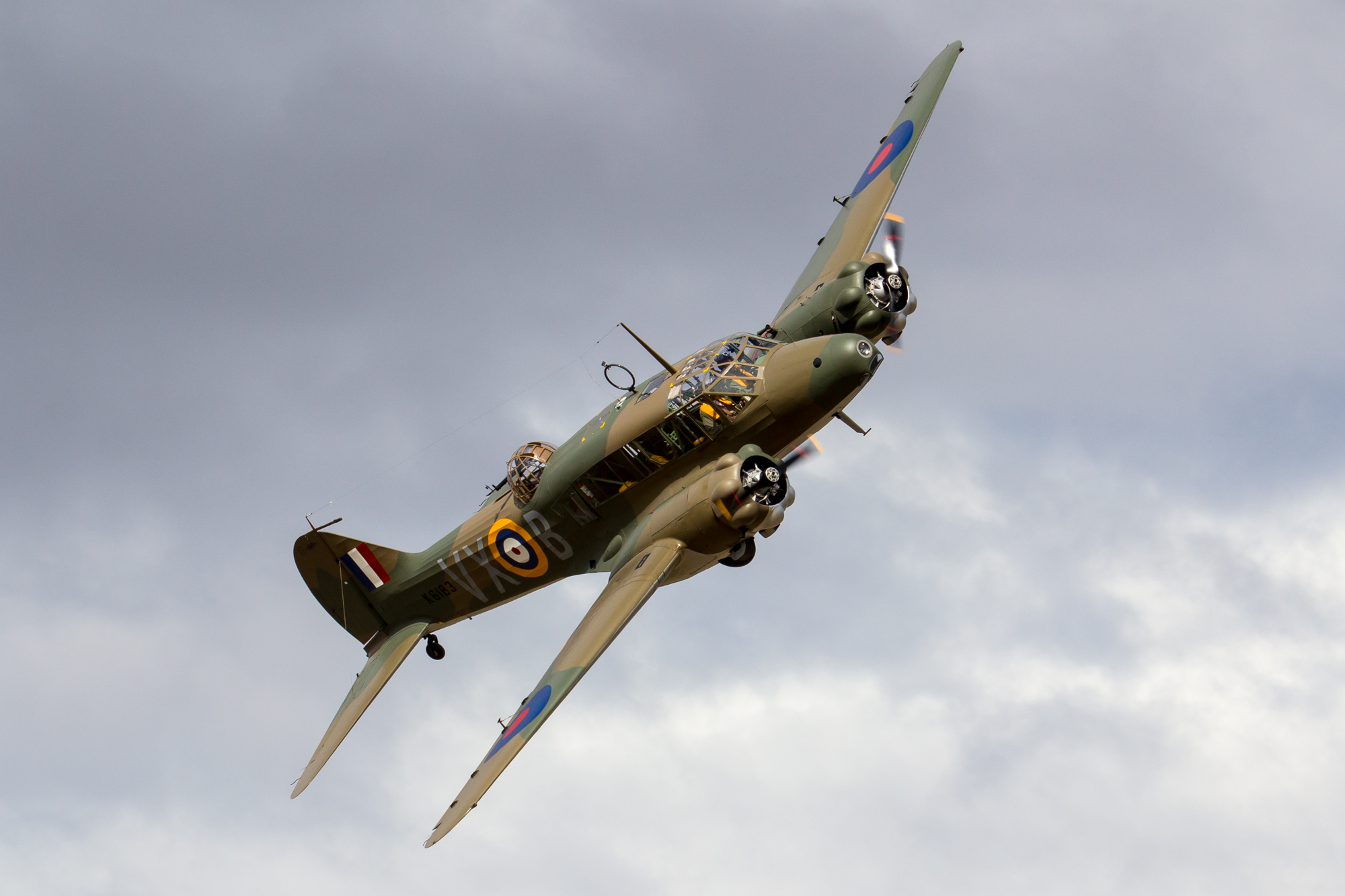
- Avro Anson Mk I, similar to the type used by 720 NAS
- Active: Royal Air Force; 1936–1939; Royal Navy: 1939–1940; 1945–1950
- Disbanded: 5 January 1950
- Country: United Kingdom
- Branch: Royal Navy
- Type: Fleet Air Arm Second Line Squadron
- Role: Catapult Flight; RN Photographic Squadron
- Size: Squadron
- Part of: Fleet Air Arm
- Home station: See Naval air stations section for full list.

Insignia
- Identification Markings: Z1-Z4 (Walrus); P9A+ (Walrus May 1939); FD8A+ (Oxford); FD8+ (Anson); 600-603 (Anson 1947)
- Fin Shore Codes: FD (1947); GJ (1948)

Aircraft flown
- Reconnaissance: Supermarine Walrus
- Trainer: Avro Anson; Airspeed Oxford

720 Naval Air Squadron (720 NAS), also called 720 Squadron, is an inactive Fleet Air Arm (FAA) naval air squadron of the United Kingdom's Royal Navy (RN). It was last active from the beginning of August 1945, when the squadron reformed from an unnumbered photographic flight at RNAS Ford, HMS Peregrine, in West Sussex, as the RN Photographic Squadron. It flew Avro Anson Mk I and later Airspeed Oxford. The squadron moved to RNAS Gosport (HMS Siskin), in Hampshire, during May 1948, but 720 Naval Air Squadron disbanded in January 1950, with 771 Naval Air Squadron taking on the aircraft and duties.

The squadron originated as the Catapult Fight for the New Zealand Division and it achieved squadron status and a shore base at Auckland, New Zealand, before the start of the Second World War. It operated with Supermarine Walrus. However, it was absorbed into 700 Naval Air Squadron in January 1940.

== History ==
=== Catapult Flight (1936–1940) ===
720 Naval Air Squadron originated as the catapult flight for the New Zealand Division. 720 (Catapult) Flight, FAA formed on 15 July 1936 at RAF Mount Batten, a Seaplane Station and flying boat base in Plymouth Sound, Devon, England. It operated Supermarine Walrus, amphibious maritime patrol aircraft. The Flight disbanded on 24 May 1939 at Auckland, New Zealand, to become 720 Squadron, FAA. On 21 January 1940 the squadron disbanded, being absorbed into 700 Naval Air Squadron.

==== Ships' Flights ====
720 (Catapult) Flight operated a couple of ships’ flights between 1936 and 1940 whilst based out of Auckland, including the Leander-class light cruiser HMNZS Achilles between 1936 and 1940 and the lead ship of the class HMNZS Leander between 1938 and 1940.

=== RN Photographic Squadron (1945–1950) ===
720 Naval Air Squadron reformed at RNAS Ford (HMS Peregrine), Sussex, on 1 August 1945 by elevating the RN Photographic Flight to squadron status, which itself had formed from an unnumbered Flight of Blackburn Shark torpedo-spotter-reconnaissance biplane and Fairey Seal spotter-reconnaissance biplane, at Ford in December 1940. It was equipped with four Avro Anson, a twin-engine multi-role training aircraft. The squadron worked alongside the RAF photographic development unit at nearby RAF Tangmere, Sussex, and provided its flying task for photographic trainees at the RN school. October 1947 saw the addition of an Airspeed Oxford, a twin-engined training aircraft and during May 1948 the squadron moved to RNAS Gosport (HMS Siskin), Hampshire. In January 1950 720 Naval Air Squadron disbanded with its role and aircraft absorbed by 771 Naval Air Squadron.

== Aircraft flown ==
The squadron operated a small number of different aircraft:

- Supermarine Walrus amphibious maritime patrol aircraft (July 1936 - January 1940)
- Avro Anson Mk I multi-role training aircraft (July 1945 - January 1950)
- Airspeed Oxford training aircraft (October 1947 - January 1949)

== Naval air stations and other airbases ==
720 Naval Air Squadron operated from a number of naval air stations of the Royal Navy, a Royal Air Force station and flying boat base, in the United Kingdom and one overseas:

1936 - 1940

- Royal Air Force Mount Batten, Devon, (15 July 1936 - 1 June 1937)
- RNZAF Station Hobsonville, Auckland, New Zealand, (1 June 1937 - 21 January 1940)
- disbanded - (21 January 1940)

1945 - 1950

- Royal Naval Air Station Ford (HMS Peregrine), Sussex, (1 August 1945 - 18 July 1947)
- Royal Air Force Tangmere, Sussex, (18 July - 25 August 1947)
- Royal Naval Air Station Ford (HMS Peregrine), Sussex, (25 August 1947 - 27 May 1948)
- Royal Naval Air Station Gosport (HMS Siskin), Hampshire, (27 May 1948 - 5 January 1950)
- disbanded - (5 January 1950)

== Commanding officers ==
List of commanding officers of 720 Naval Air Squadron with date of appointment:

1936 - 1940

- Lieutenant T.P. Coode, RN, (Flight Lieutenant RAF), from 15 July 1936
- Lieutenant G.W.R. Nicholl, RN, (Flight Lieutenant RAF), from 30 April 1937
- Lieutenant Commander B.E.W. Logan, RN, from 24 May 1939
- disbanded 21 January 1940

1945 - 1950

- Lieutenant Commander(A) J.N. Gladish, RNVR, from 1 July 1945
- Lieutenant Commander(A) T.G. Stubley, RNVR, from 10 August 1945
- Lieutenant(A) D.G. Dick, RNVR, from 28 September 1945
- Lieutenant(A) G.H. Davies, RNVR, from 10 December 1945
- Lieutenant(A) W.A. Murray, RN, from 14 February 1946
- Lieutenant(A) E.R.G. Green, RN, from 5 November 1947
- Lieutenant(A) H. Phillips, RN, from 25 October 1948
- Lieutenant D.J. Whitehead, RN, from 12 December 1949
- disbanded - 5 January 1950

Note: Abbreviation (A) signifies Air Branch of the RN or RNVR.
