= 750 Naval Air Squadron =

Flying squadron of the Royal Navy's Fleet Air Arm

- Squadron badge
- Active: 24 May 1939 – 10 October 1945; 1 February 1952 – present
- Country: United Kingdom
- Branch: Royal Navy
- Type: Fleet Air Arm Second Line Squadron
- Role: Observer & Weapons Systems Officer training
- Size: Four aircraft
- Part of: Fleet Air Arm
- Home station: RNAS Culdrose
- Mottos: Teach and strike
- Aircraft: Beechcraft Avenger T1
- Website: Official website

Commanders
- Current commander: Lieutenant Commander Phil Clark, RN

Insignia
- Squadron badge description: Blue, over water barry wavy white and blue a winged Greek runner in sandals in his dexter hand a torch fired proper and in his sinister hand a sword all white (1945)
- Identification Markings: W1A+, W1AA+ & W0-A+ (Shark); numbers 1-78 (Albacore); B1+ (Barracuda); 300-316 (Barracuda/Firefly from February 1952); 600-612 (Anson/Sea Prince from February 1952); 664-679 also 590-599 (all types from January 1956); 618-680 (all types July 1965); 560-579 (all types September 1972); unmarked (Avenger T.1)
- Fin Shore Codes: MF:SR (Barracuda/Firefly from February 1952); MF:SR:CU (Anson/Sea Prince from February 1952); HF (all types from January 1956); LM (all types from July 1965); CU (all types from September 1972)

750 Naval Air Squadron (750 NAS), also known as 750 Squadron, is a Fleet Air Arm naval air squadron of the Royal Navy (RN). Based at RNAS Culdrose, it operates Beechcraft Avenger T.1 utility aircraft as training aircraft for RN Observers and Royal Air Force (RAF) Weapons Systems Officer (WSOs). The squadron's training develops aircrew in navigation, communications, sensor operations and mission command, preparing Royal Navy Observers for service in Fleet Air Arm helicopters and RAF WSOs for ISTAR and maritime patrol aircraft.

The squadron's origins lie in the Royal Navy's observer-training organisation established at Lee-on-Solent in 1917. On 24 May 1939, 750 Squadron was formed at RNAS Ford from the Royal Navy Observers School, which subsequently became No. 1 Observers School. During the Second World War, the squadron was transferred to RNAS Piarco, Trinidad, where it continued observer training until it was disbanded in October 1945. It reformed at RNAS St Merryn on 1 February 1952 and subsequently operated from RNAS Culdrose, RNAS Hal Far in Malta and RNAS Lossiemouth in Scotland before returning to RNAS Culdrose in 1972. The squadron has operated a succession of aircraft, including Blackburn Sharks, Fairey Albacores, Fairey Barracudas, Percival Sea Princes, Handley Page Jetstreams and, since 2011, Avenger T.1s.

== History ==
=== Observer School and Second World War ===
The origins of 750 Naval Air Squadron lie in the Royal Navy's observer-training organisation at Lee-on-Solent, Hampshire. The Naval Seaplane Training School was established there on 30 July 1917 to train naval aircrew. During the interwar period the school operated under a succession of titles, including the RAF Seaplane Training School and the School of Naval Co-operation, before naval aviation returned to Admiralty control in 1939.

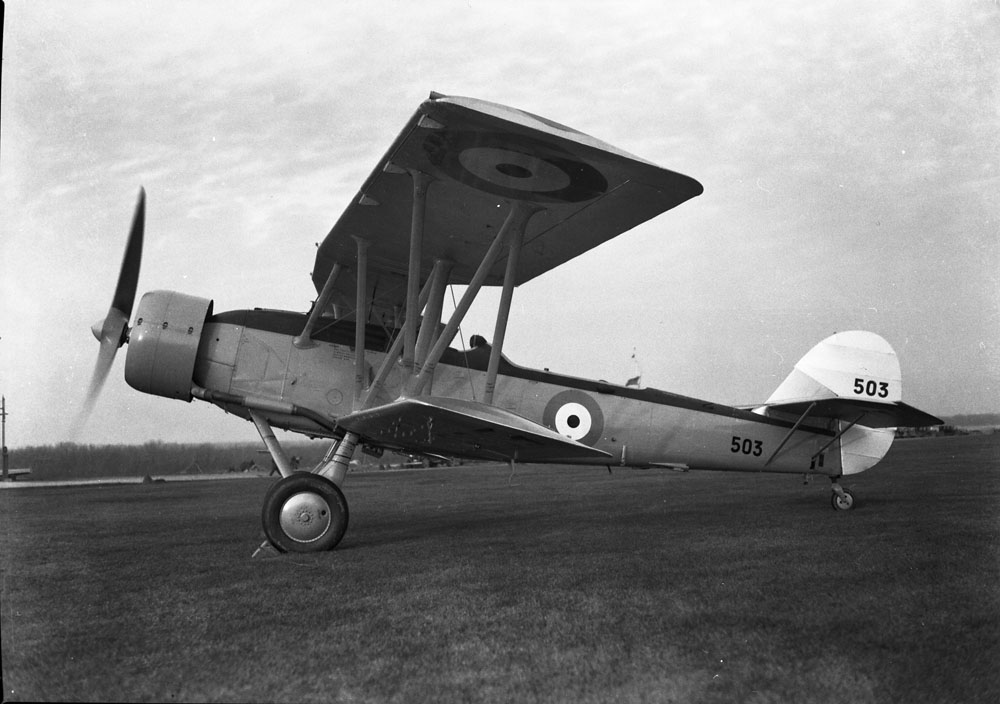
Blackburn Shark; an example of the type used by 750 Squadron

750 Squadron was formed at RNAS Ford, West Sussex, on 24 May 1939 from the Royal Navy Observers School, which subsequently became No. 1 Observers School. Initially equipped with Blackburn Shark torpedo bombers, the squadron used RNAS Yeovilton, Somerset, for dispersal from about May 1940. Following the bombing of RNAS Ford in August, most of the squadron moved to RNAS Yeovilton, but the airfield was considered unsuitable for the school's requirements and it was decided to transfer the school overseas.

Changing title from a school to a squadron did not change its basic purpose, which was the training of observers for the Fleet Air Arm. The squadron initially flew Hawker Ospreys and Blackburn Sharks, but in November 1940 it moved to Piarco Savannah (HMS Goshawk) in Trinidad and at about the same time re-equipped with Fairey Albacore torpedo bombers.

On 15 January 1941, 21 officers and 121 ratings from 749, 750 and 752 squadrons sailed from Liverpool on SS Almeda Star bound for Trinidad. Two days later German submarine U-96 sank Almeda Star in heavy seas 35 miles (56 km) north of Rockall. There were no survivors.

750 Squadron remained at RNAS Piarco for the remainder of the Second World War, operating the Observer School, and was disbanded there in October 1945.

=== Reformation and Observer training (1952-1978) ===
750 Squadron reformed at RNAS St Merryn, Cornwall on 1 February 1952 with 12 Fairey Barracudas and four Avro Ansons transferred from 796 Squadron. It assumed responsibility for the Observer School's basic navigation, signals and radar training, as well as training Air Telegraphists in W/T Morse and operation of the sonobuoy system.

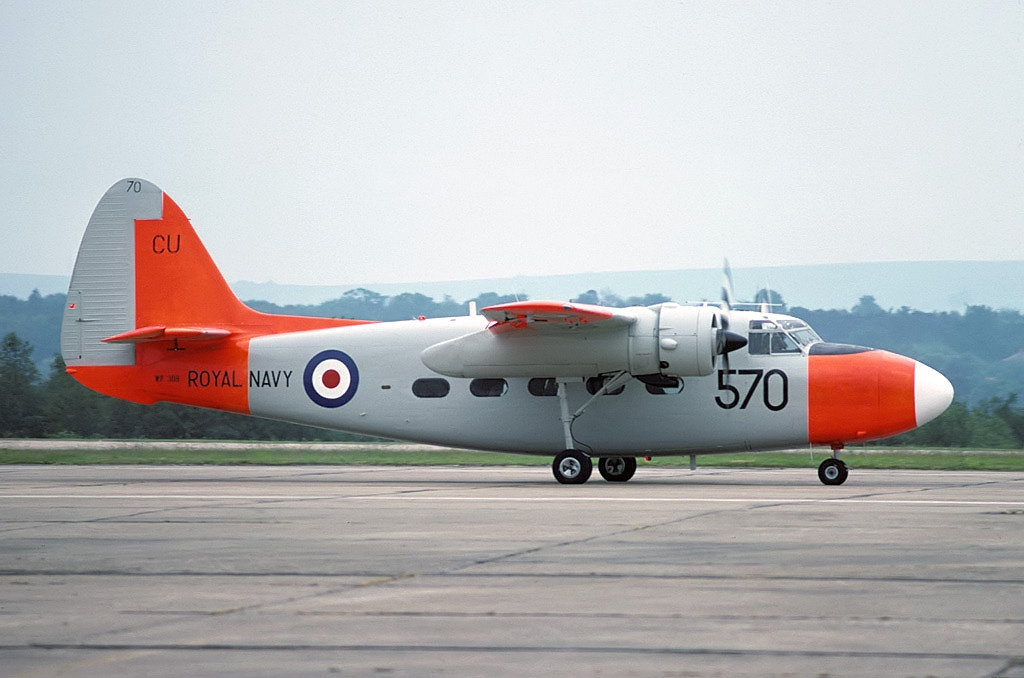
Percival Sea Prince T.1 of 750 Squadron at RNAS Culdrose

The squadron re-equipped with Fairey Firefly T.7s and Percival Sea Prince T.1s in 1953 and moved from RNAS St Merryn to RNAS Culdrose, also in Cornwall, on 25 November that year. Under a reorganisation of duties in March 1955, the Fairey Fireflies were transferred to 796 Squadron. 750 Squadron continued as the sole squadron flying for the Observer School after 796 Squadron was disbanded in October 1958. The unit was redesignated the Observer and Air Signal School in 1955 and, following the discontinuation of Air Telegraphist training, became the Observer School again in May 1959.

In October 1959, the squadron's nine Percival Sea Princes were deployed to RNAS Hal Far in Malta, where Observer training continued. de Havilland Sea Venoms were introduced in July 1960 for high-level navigation and some Fleet Requirements Unit work, with navigation exercises taking the aircraft to locations including Idris, Naples, Palma, Rome and Sigonella. In 1965 the squadron returned to the United Kingdom, with the de Havilland Sea Venoms flying to RNAS Lossiemouth, Moray, in late June and the Percival Sea Princes following in early July. Navigation training continued on a reduced scale, with visits to destinations including Amsterdam, Brussels, Copenhagen, Oslo, Valkenburg and Vaerlose.

750 Squadron returned to RNAS Culdrose in September 1972. From October 1978, it began replacing its Sea Princes with Jetstream T.2 aircraft.

=== Jetstream and Heron Flight (1978–2011) ===
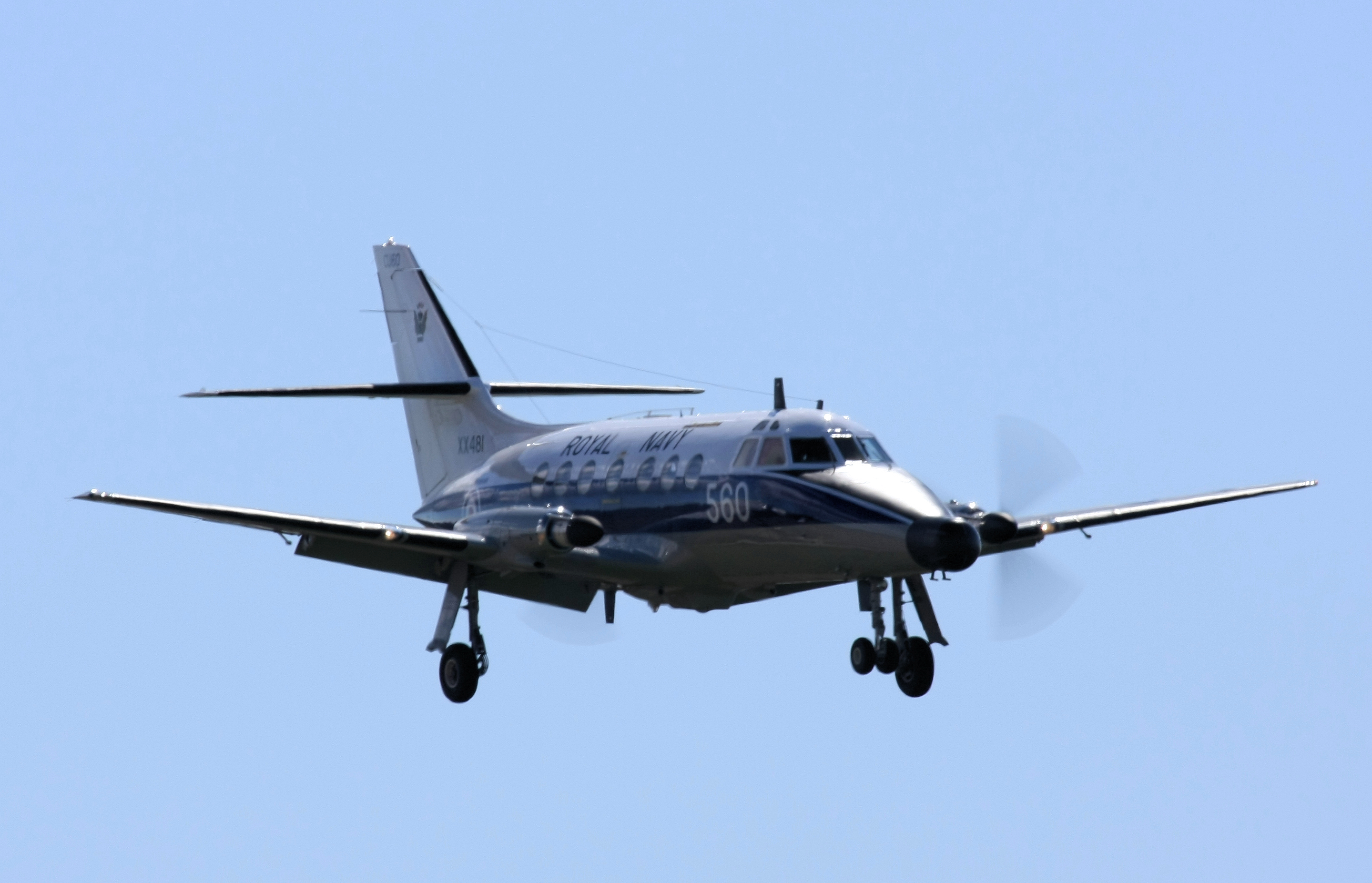
Handley Page Jetstream T.2, 'XX481' of 750 Squadron landing at RNAS Culdrose

In April 1981, the squadron combined with the Observer School to become a single unit. A number of Jetstream T.3s served with the squadron from April 1986 and were transferred to Heron Flight at RNAS Yeovilton by April 1993.

In April 1998, 750 Squadron absorbed the remaining task of Yeovilton Station Flight, which was renamed 750 Heron Flight. The T.3s continued to operate in a communications role as a detachment at Yeovilton until the flight was disbanded on 30 September 2008.

=== Avenger (2011-present) ===
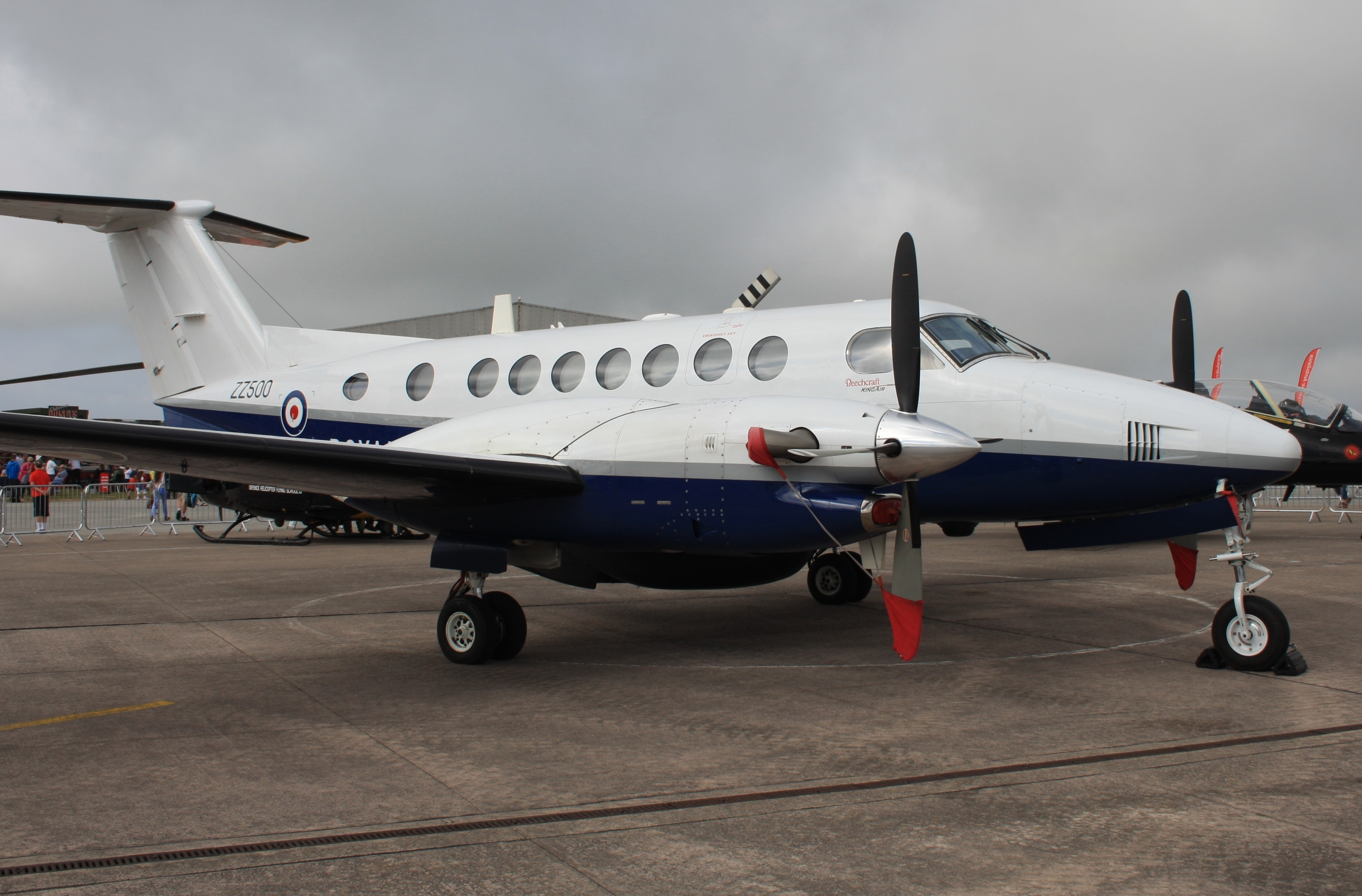
Beechcraft Avenger T.1

The Jetstream T.2s remained in service with 750 Squadron until March 2011, with the squadron flying its final Jetstream sortie on 14 March. The Jetstreams were subsequently replaced by Beechcraft King Air 350ER aircraft, designated Avenger T.1, for Observer training.

The first students began flying the Avenger in 2012. The squadron subsequently expanded its training role to include Royal Air Force aircrew as well as Royal Navy Observers.

750 Naval Air Squadron remains based at RNAS Culdrose. It currently trains Royal Navy Observers on a six-month Basic Flying Training course and Royal Air Force Weapon Systems Officers on a three-month WSO Lead-In Course. Training includes navigation, sensor operations, maritime operations, search and rescue, multi-tasking and mission command. The squadron operates four Beechcraft King Air 350ER Avenger T.1 aircraft and four simulators.

== Aircraft flown ==
The squadron has flown a number of different aircraft types, including:

- Blackburn Shark torpedo bomber (May 1939 - June 1942)
- Fairey Albacore torpedo bomber (December 1940 - August 1945)
- Fairey Barracuda Mk II torpedo and dive bomber (November 1944 - October 1945)
- Fairey Barracuda TR.3 torpedo-reconnaissance aircraft (February 1952 - July 1953)
- Avro Anson Mk I multi-role training aircraft (April 1952 - May 1953)
- Percival Sea Prince T.1 anti-submarine training aircraft (February 1953 - May 1979)
- Fairey Firefly T.Mk 7 anti-submarine warfare training aircraft(April 1953 - March 1955)
- Airspeed Oxford I training aircraft (March - April 1957)
- de Havilland Sea Devon C Mk 20 transport and communications aircraft (March 1957 - August 1961)
- de Havilland Sea Venom FAW.21 all-weather fighter aircraft (July 1960 - October 1961)
- de Havilland Sea Venom FAW.22 all-weather fighter aircraft (August 1961 - March 1970)
- de Havilland Sea Vampire T.22 two-seat trainer (January 1962 - May 1965)
- Handley Page Jetstream T.2 (later BAe) trainer and communications aircraft (October 1978 - March 2011)
- Handley Page Jetstream T.3 trainer and communications aircraft (April 1986 - April 1993, April 1998 - September 2008)
- Beechcraft Avenger T.1 utility aircraft (June 2011 - date)
A selection of aircraft previously and currently operated by 750 Naval Air Squadron
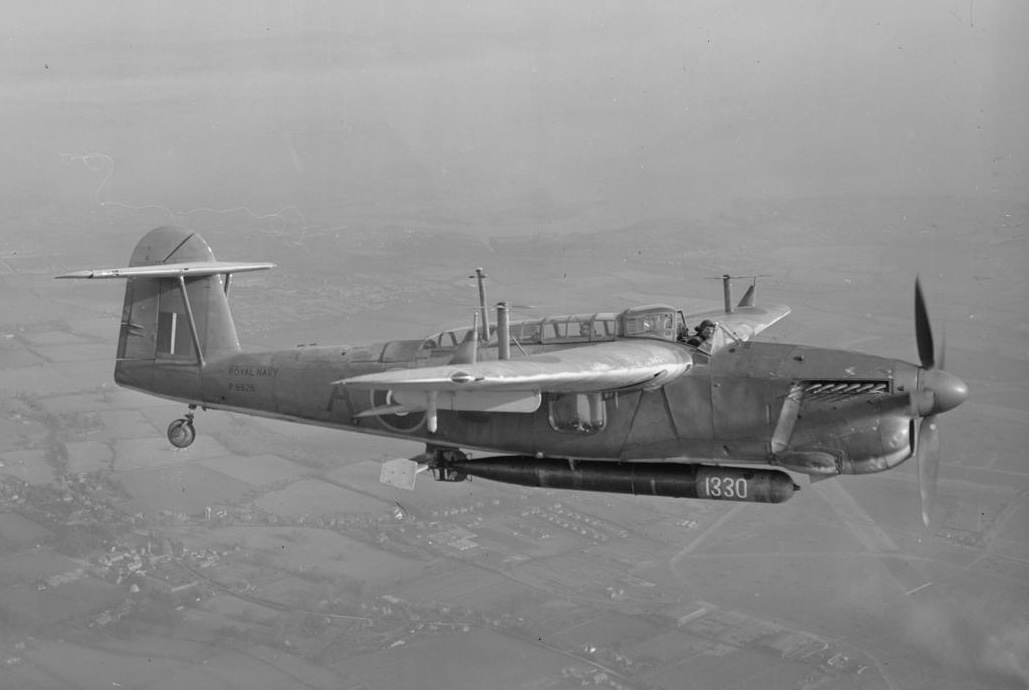
Fairey Barracuda Mk II

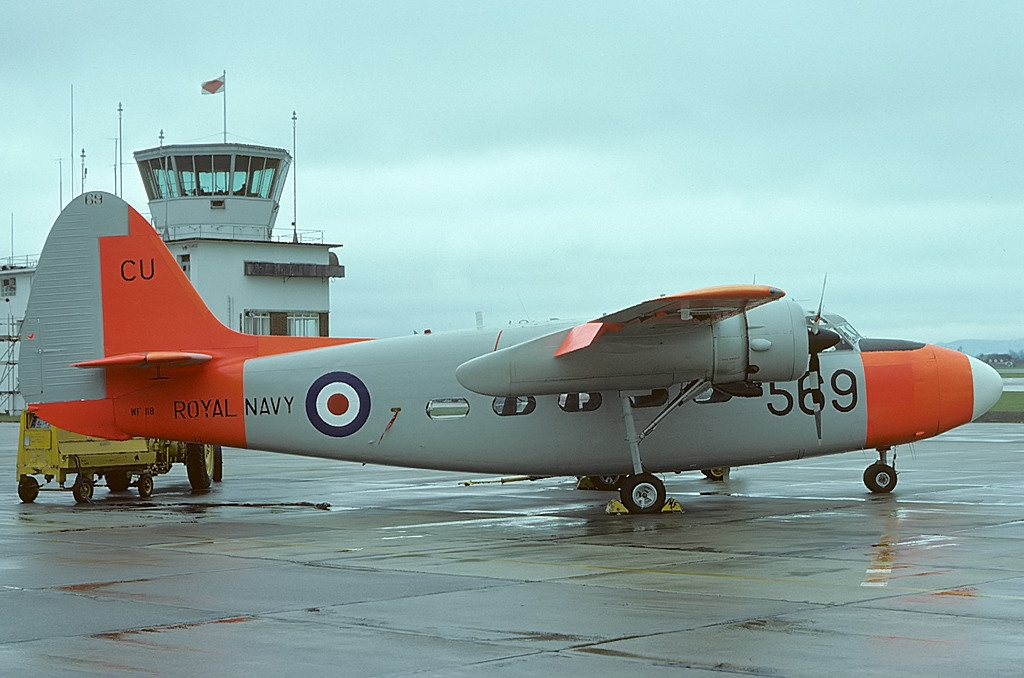
Percival Sea Prince T.1 of 750 Squadron based at RNAS Culdrose.

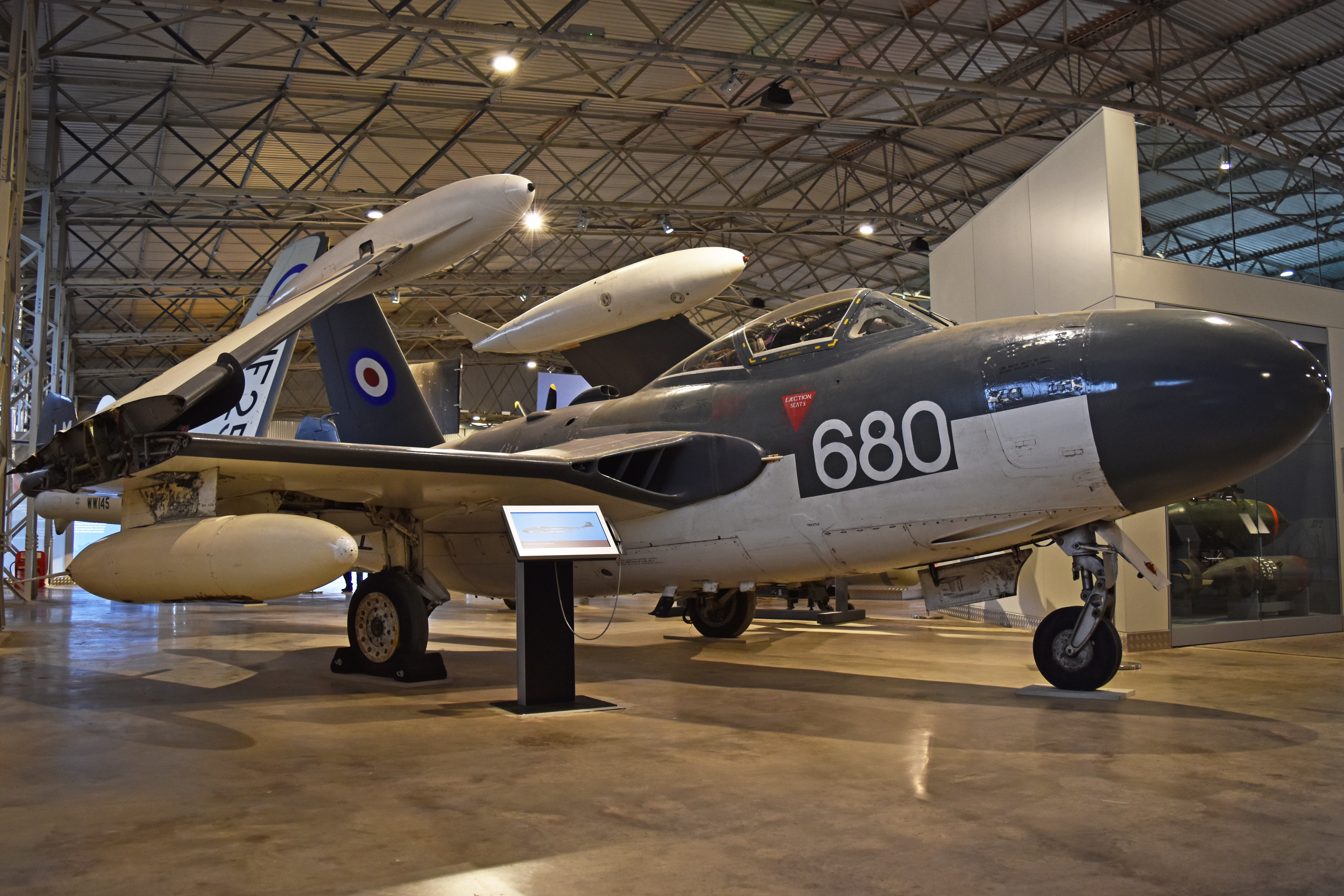
de Havilland Sea Venom FAW.22 ‘WW145 - LM-680’; in the markings of 750 Squadron.

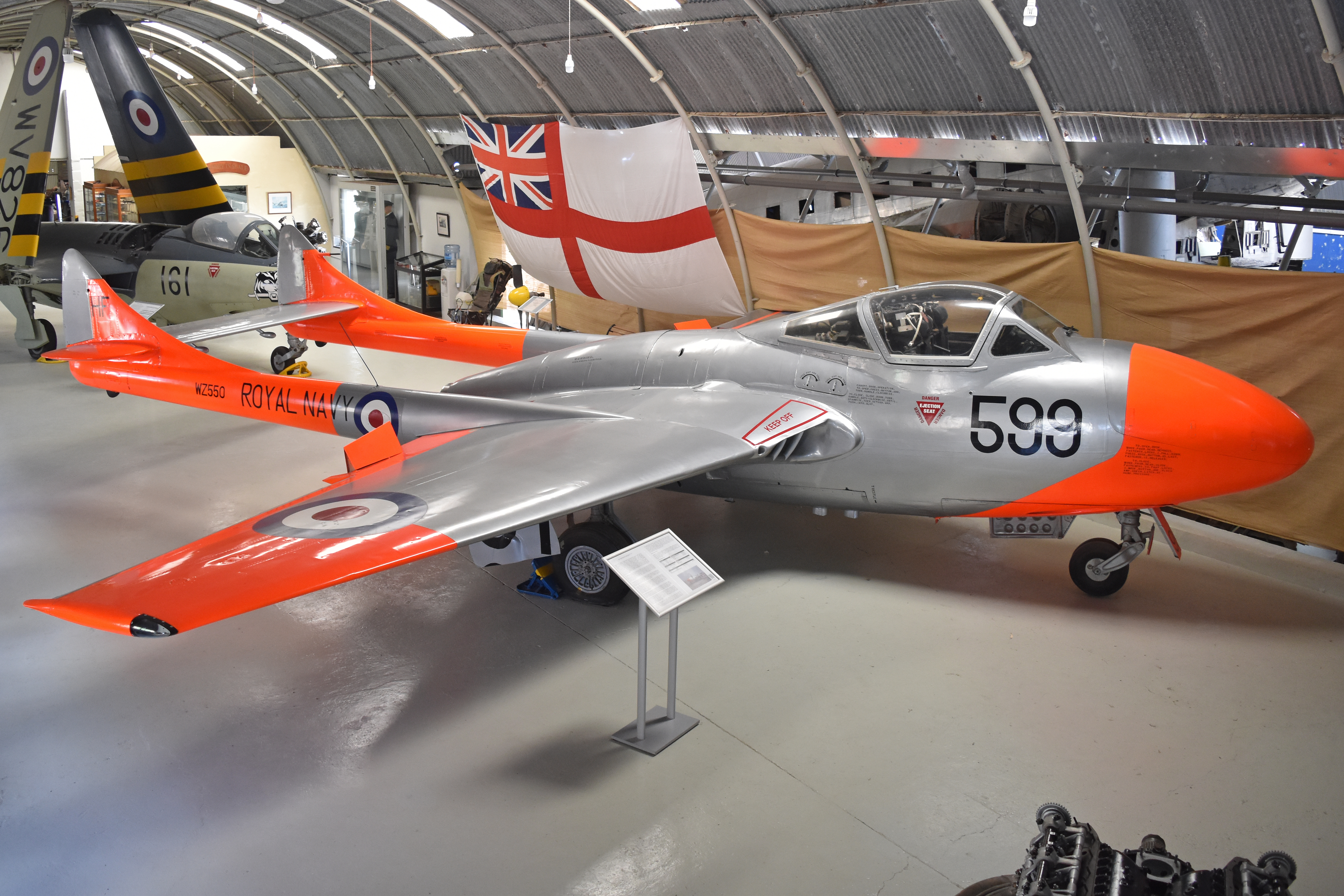
de Havilland Sea Vampire T.22; operated by 750 Squadron of the Royal Navy, based at RNAS Hal Far (HMS Falcon).

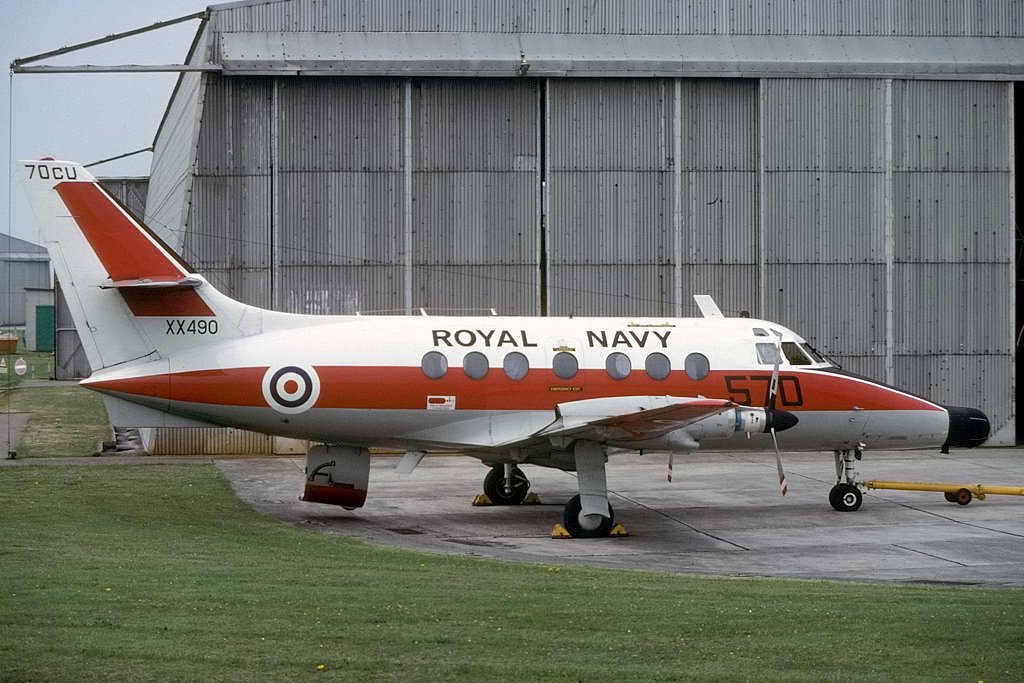
Handley Page Jetstream T.2 of 750 Squadron in the original, but short lived, Red and White colour scheme.

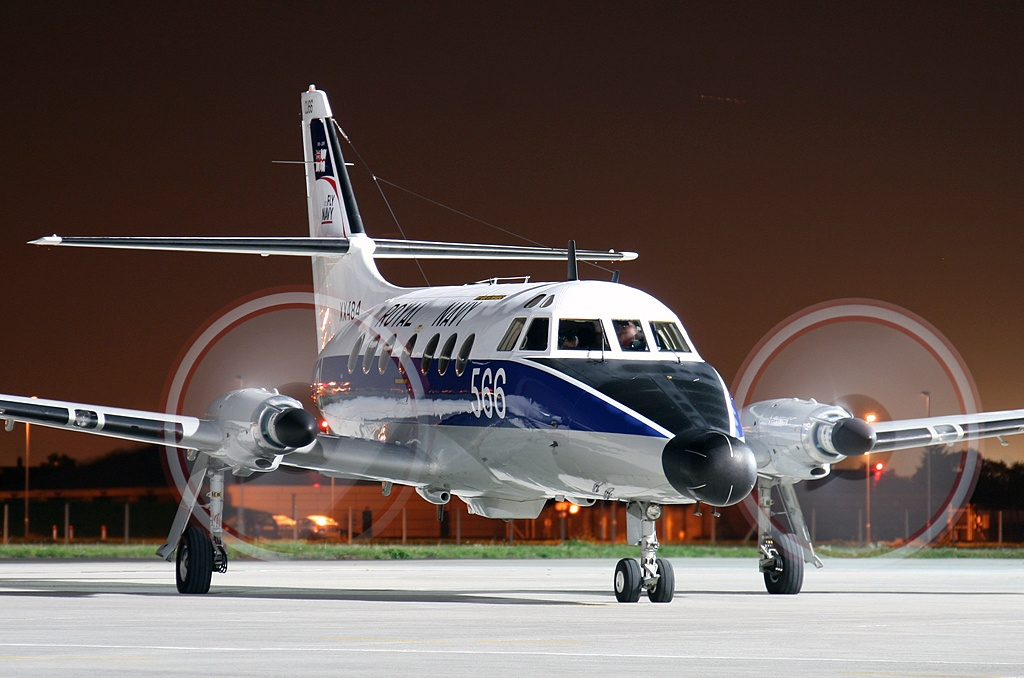
Handley Page Jetstream T.2 of 750 Squadron at RNAS Culdrose.

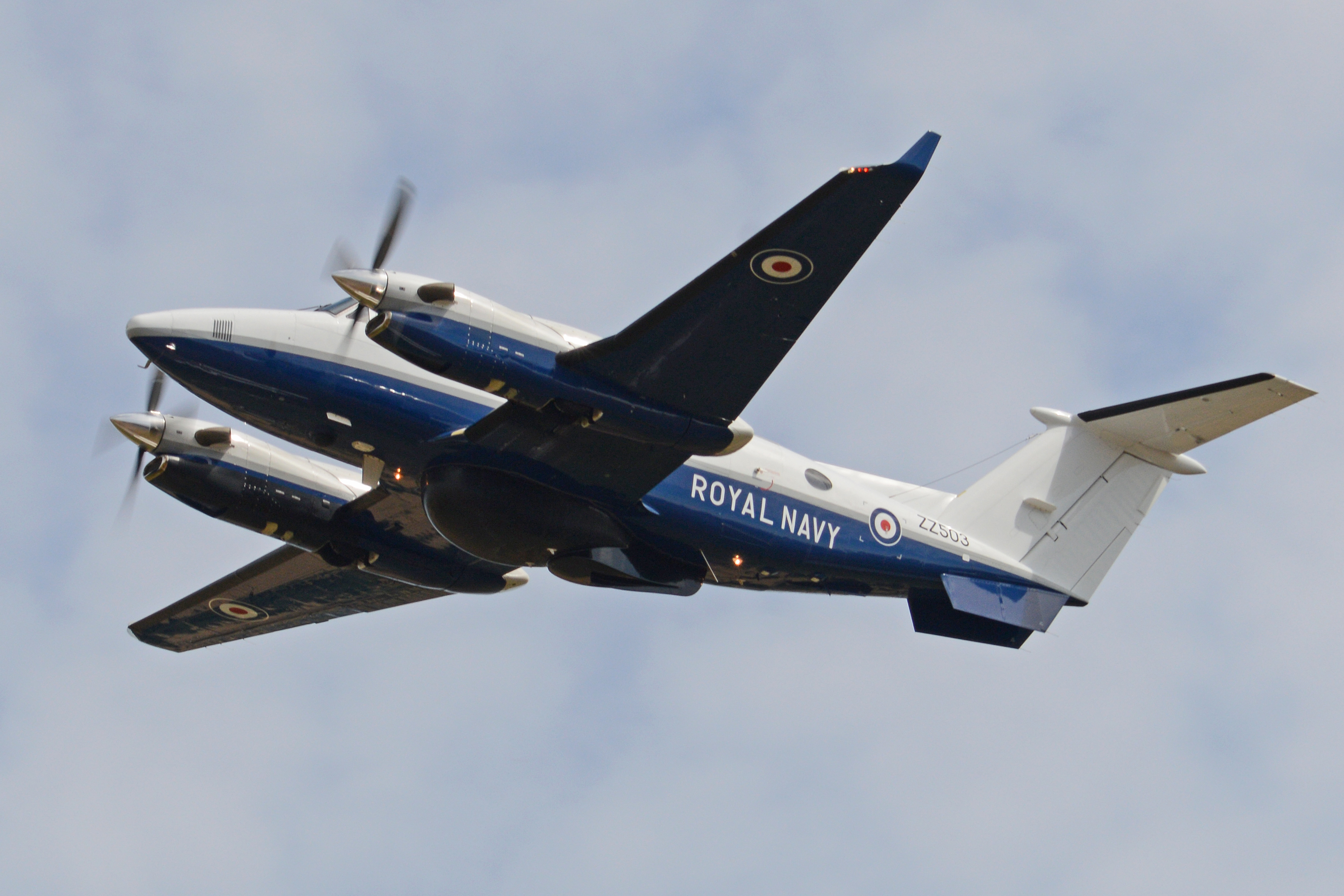
Beechcraft Avenger T.1 ‘ZZ503’; operated by 750 Squadron at RNAS Culdrose.

== Naval air stations ==
750 Naval Air Squadron has operated from various naval air stations of the Royal Navy, throughout the United Kingdom and one overseas:

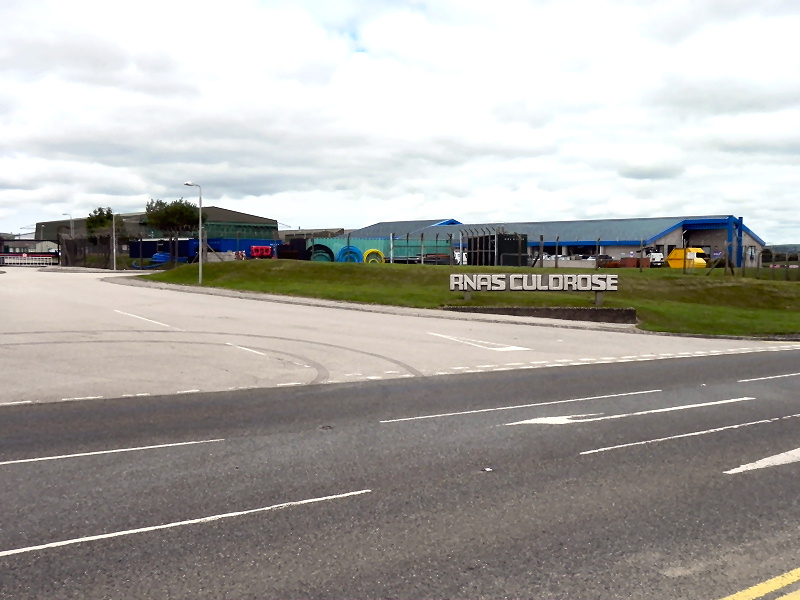
RNAS Culdrose (HMS Seahawk) entrance

1939 - 1945

- Royal Naval Air Station Ford (HMS Peregrine), West Sussex, (24 May 1939 - May 1940)
- dispersal at Royal Naval Air Station Yeovilton (HMS Heron), Somerset, (from May - 12 October 1940)
- transit (12 October - 5 November 1940)
- Royal Naval Air Station Piarco (HMS Goshawk), Trinidad, (5 November 1940 - 10 October 1945)
- disbanded - (10 October 1945)

1952 - present

- Royal Naval Air Station St Merryn (HMS Vulture), Cornwall, (1 February 1952 - 25 November 1953)
- Royal Naval Air Station Culdrose (HMS Seahawk), Cornwall, (25 November 1953 - 13 October 1959)
- Royal Naval Air Station Hal Far (HMS Falcon), Malta, (13 October 1959 - 23 June 1965)
- Royal Naval Air Station Lossiemouth (HMS Fulmar), Moray, (23 June 1965 - 26 September 1972)
- Royal Naval Air Station Culdrose (HMS Seahawk), Cornwall, (26 September 1972 - present)
  - Royal Naval Air Station Yeovilton (HMS Heron), Somerset, (Detachment three aircraft ‘Heron Flight’ 1 September 1998 - 30 September 2008)

== Commanding officers ==
List of commanding officers of 750 Naval Air Squadron with date of appointment:

1939 - 1945

- Commander(A) J.H.F. Burroughs, RN, from 24 May 1939
- Lieutenant Commander C.A. Kingsley-Rowe, RN, from 1 February 1940
- Lieutenant Commander(A) T.G. Stubley, RNVR, from 30 September 1940
- Lieutenant Commander(A) E.K. Lee, RNVR, from 1 December 1941
- Lieutenant Commander(A) F.E. Darlow, RNVR, from 1 June 1943
- Lieutenant Commander(A) J.H. Crook, RNVR, from 6 December 1943
- Lieutenant Commander(A) H. Whitaker, RNVR, from 15 March 1945
- Lieutenant Commander(A) F.B. Gardner, RNVR, from 1 August 1945
- disbanded - 10 October 1945

1952 - present

- Lieutenant(E) S.E. Adams, RN, from 1 February 1952
- Lieutenant Commander P.H. Fradd, RN, from 17 April 1952
- Lieutenant Commander E.F Pritchard, RN, from 19 January 1953
- Lieutenant Commander P.A. Jordan, RN, from 10 February 1954
- Lieutenant Commander J.C.N. Shrubsole, RN, from 15 March 1954
- Lieutenant Commander H.P. Allingham, RN, from 29 June 1956
- Lieutenant Commander M.F. Bowen, RN, from 14 January 1958
- Lieutenant Commander A.T.J. Diboll, RN, from 10 September 1958
- Lieutenant Commander E.T. Genge, RN, from 7 October 1958
- Lieutenant Commander P. Cane, RN, from 22 October 1960
- Lieutenant Commander A.C. Whitton, RN, from 19 October 1962
- Lieutenant Commander K. Sindair, MBE, RN, from 11 November 1964
- Lieutenant Commander C.R. Mellor, RN, from 16 July 1966
- Lieutenant Commander J.S. Humphreys, MBE, RN, from 16 August 1968
- Lieutenant Commander N.C. Arkinson, RN, from 16 June 1970
- Lieutenant Commander C.K. Manning, RN, from 1 September 1972
- Lieutenant Commander J.H. Eagle, RN, from 29 March 1974
- Lieutenant Commander L.A. Wilkinson, RN, from 20 December 1974
- Lieutenant Commander N.L.C. Featherstone, RN, from 8 November 1976
- Lieutenant Commander P.M. Burgess, RN, from 15 July 1979
- Lieutenant Commander R.E. Just, RN, from 10 April 1981
- Lieutenant Commander C.R.W. Griffin, RN, from 23 June 1982
- Lieutenant Commander J.D.O. MacDonald, RN, from 20 August 1984 (Commander 1 September 1985)
- Lieutenant Commander A. Rees, RN, from 6 March 1986
- Lieutenant Commander D.L.W. Sim, RN, from 7 October 1988
- Lieutenant Commander R.D. Boag, RN, from 22 March 1990 (Commander 1 October 1990)
- Lieutenant Commander I.V. Munday, RN from 10 March 1991
- Lieutenant Commander J.E. Ward, RN, from 23 March 1993 (Commander 30 December 1994)
- Lieutenant Commander K.W. Terrill, RN, from 26 July 1995
- Lieutenant Commander S.P. Lacey, RN, from 28 August 1998
- Lieutenant Commander S. Powell, RN, from 28 July 2000
- Lieutenant Commander D.L. Carr, RN, from 4 January 2003
- Lieutenant Commander C.J. Daniell, RN, from 24 March 2005
- Lieutenant Commander B.J.S. Wheaton, RN, from 2 January 2007
- Lieutenant Commander N.P.B. Armstrong, RN, from 3 June 2009
- Lieutenant Commander C.J.H. Barber, RN, from 23 November 2011
- Lieutenant Commander C.D. Whitson-Fay, RN, from 1 April 2014
- Lieutenant Commander C. Newby, RN, from 29 July 2016
- Lieutenant Commander A. Lang, RN, (before) 6 Aug 2018
- Lieutenant Commander B. Crewdson, RN, from 26 June 2020
- Lieutenant Commander D. Breward, RN, from 22 November 2022
- Lieutenant Commander P. Clark, RN, from 6 December 2024

Note: Abbreviation (A) signifies Air Branch of the RN or RNVR.
