= Ford, West Sussex =

Village and parish in West Sussex, England

Coordinates: 50.824°N 0.580°W

Ford
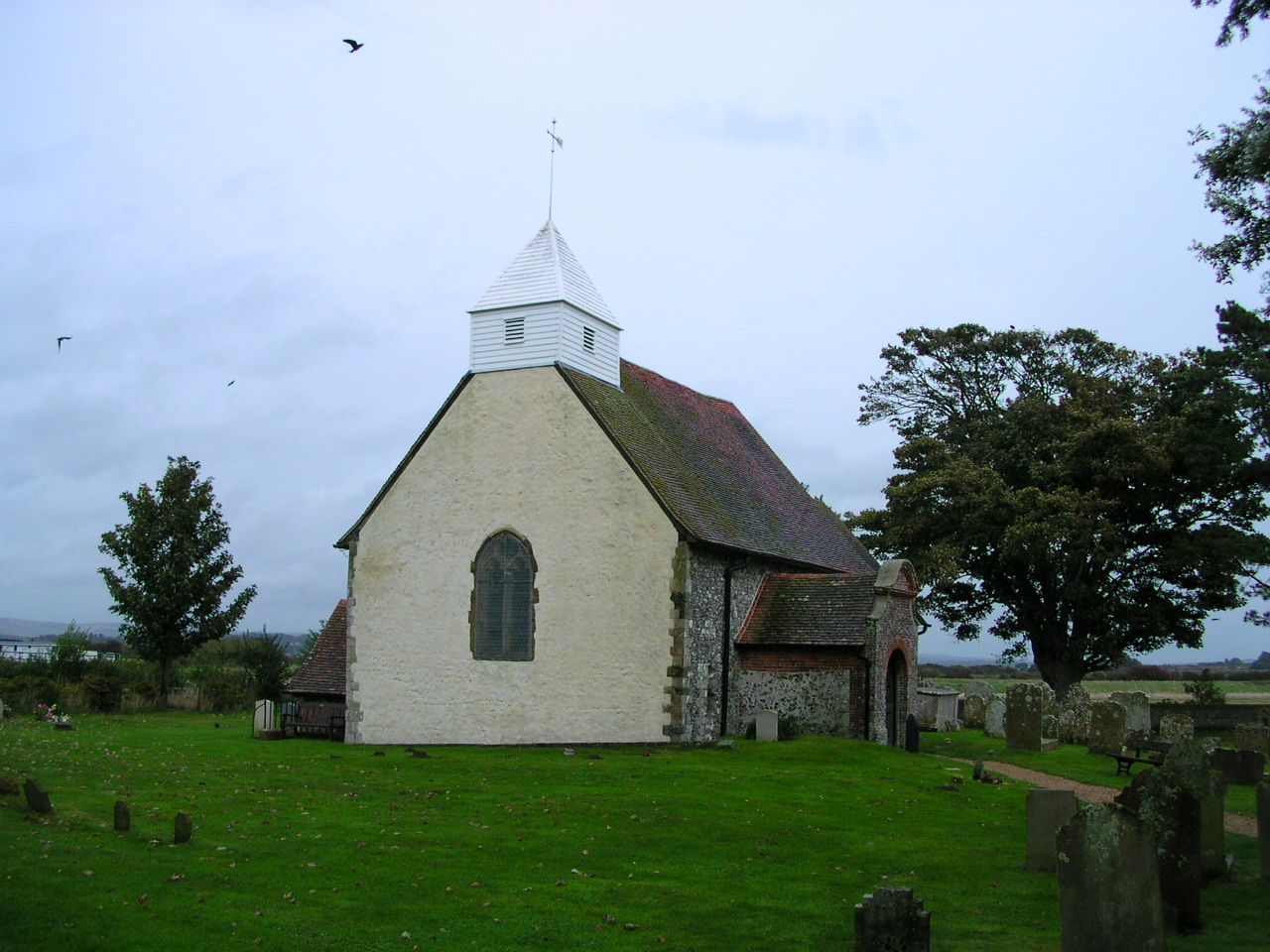
- St. Andrew by the ford

- Location within West Sussex
- Area: 4.08 km^{2} (1.58 sq mi)
- Population: 1,690 (Civil Parish 2011)
  - Density: 414/km^{2} (1,070/sq mi)
- OS grid reference: TQ000036
  - London: 51 miles (82 km) NNE
- Civil parish: Ford
- District: Arun
- Shire county: West Sussex
- Region: South East
- Country: England
- Sovereign state: United Kingdom
- Post town: Arundel
- Postcode district: BN18
- Dialling code: 01903 or 01243
- Police: Sussex
- Fire: West Sussex
- Ambulance: South East Coast
- UK Parliament: Arundel and South Downs

Ford is a village and civil parish in the Arun District of West Sussex, England. It is centred 2 miles (3 km) south by south-west of Arundel and west of Worthing. The civil parish very gently slopes to the east, where it has the public track alongside the River Arun and the land is low but well-drained at 2 to 7 metres above Ordnance Datum (sea level).

The parish includes HM Prison Ford, otherwise known as Ford Open Prison centred on the site of two former government installations, the RAF Ford Battle of Britain airfield and the Royal Naval Air Station HMS Peregrine. These have a small commemorative garden, Rollaston Park, along the road of the same name.

Ford railway station is on the West Coastway Line which has the listed building and pub next to it on semi-rural Arundel Road. Some larger units of Rudford Industrial estate are in the south of the parish.

== Amenities ==
The Arundel Arms next to the station is on the Arundel Road and is listed in the starting category of the national grading scheme, at Grade II.

=== Parish church ===
The Church of England parish church of Saint Andrew-by-the-Ford is near the River Arun, surrounded by a walled churchyard entered through a wrought iron gate. The Saxon church was built in about 1040, and substantially rebuilt by the Normans with a surviving early 12th-century Norman chancel arch with carved decoration. There are Saxon and Norman lancet windows in the north wall of the nave, which survives from the original building. Over a north door in this wall, which leads to a vestry, there are fragments of Anglo-Saxon interlaced carving. The Decorated Gothic east window dates from about 1320 and the Perpendicular Gothic west window dates from about 1420. The brick-built Jacobean south porch is from about 1640 and has a pedimented Dutch gable. The wooden bell-turret, painted white as a navigational landmark for ships, has two bells, the smaller of which was cast by Robert Rider, who is known to have worked 1351 and 1386. The font, carved from a square limestone block, may be Saxon or Norman and stands on a modern Bath Stone plinth. The church is a Grade I listed building.

== "Eco-town" proposal ==
In 2008 Ford was shortlisted on the government's "Eco Town" plan. The Government earmarked its airfield site as a proposed core of a new settlement in the sub-regional county plan copied over into the draft South East England Regional Spatial Strategy. In a public consultation to Arun District Council's core strategy issues and options, as part of the new local development framework, Ford was one of thirteen suggested locations, across the UK, for a new settlement. Arun District Council held an inquiry in 2009 into suitability as a main component of its public consultation. Following a significant and vocal local campaign, citing a large number of adverse factors, the government has abandoned plans for a substantial urban settlement here.
