= Airline Superintendents Association =

ASA
- Airline Superintendents Association
- Headquarters: 43 Fifth Street, Barataria, Trinidad and Tobago
- Location: Trinidad and Tobago

The Airline Superintendents Association is a trade union in Trinidad and Tobago with most of its members in the former airline of BWIA.

It was one out of four unions recognized by BWIA, the other three being the Trinidad and Tobago Airline Pilots Association, the Aviation, Communication and Allied Workers Union and the Communication, Transport and General Workers Union.
