= Svanberg =

Svanberg is a surname. Notable people with the surname include:

- Bo Svanberg (born 1967), ice-hockey player
- Carl-Henric Svanberg, Swedish businessman, chairman of Volvo
- Eiður Svanberg Guðnason, Icelandic politician and diplomat
- John Svanberg, Swedish runner
- Jöns Svanberg, clergyman and natural scientist
- Katarina Svanberg, Swedish physician and oncologist
- Kurt Svanberg, Swedish ice-hockey player
- Lars Fredrik Svanberg, chemist and mineralogist
- Mattias Svanberg, Swedish footballer
- Max Walter Svanberg, surrealist painter, illustrator and designer
- Micke Svanberg, Swedish musician and composer, known as Lord Ahriman
- Ola Svanberg (born 1985), Swedish ice-hockey player
- Olavi Svanberg, Finnish ski-orienteering competitor
- Roger Svanberg, Swedish curler
- Sven-Erik Svanberg, Swedish airline chief executive

== Other ==
- 8871 Svanberg, a minor asteroid named after Gustaf Svanberg
