= Fly Jamaica Airways =

Former Jamaican-Guyanese airline

IATA	ICAO	Call sign
OJ	FJM	GREENHEART
- Founded: 7 September 2011; 15 years ago
- Commenced operations: 14 February 2013; 13 years ago
- Ceased operations: 31 March 2019; 7 years ago
- Hubs: Norman Manley International Airport; Cheddi Jagan International Airport
- Fleet size: 1
- Destinations: 4
- Headquarters: Kingston, Jamaica
- Key people: Paul Ronald Reece (chairman and CEO)
- Employees: TBA
- Website: www.fly-jamaica.com

Fly Jamaica Airways was a Jamaican-Guyanese airline headquartered in Kingston, Jamaica. The airline's main hub was based in Norman Manley International Airport in Kingston, Jamaica. The airline mainly offered routes to North America. On 31 March 2019, Fly Jamaica Airways suspended operations and made all employee positions redundant due to the lack of aircraft. The airline had been trying to recover after one of its aircraft experienced a runway excursion at Guyana's Cheddi Jagan International Airport in November 2018. The company slogan was One Team, One Dream.

== History ==
Fly Jamaica Airways was formed by the Chairman/Chief Executive Officer (CEO), Guyana-born Paul Ronald Reece, Mrs. Roxanne Reece and three Jamaican shareholders including Captain Lloyd Tai and Mrs. Christine Steele and Mrs. Shaun Lawson-Laing. Captain Reece is also the owner of Wings Aviation Ltd, based in Guyana, which owns and operates Cessna aircraft in the interior of Guyana.

Fly Jamaica Airways was certified by the Jamaica Civil Aviation Authority (JCAA) in September 2012 and was cleared to operate in the United States by US authorities in December. Its inaugural flight from Kingston to New York's John F. Kennedy International Airport in the United States, was made on 14 February 2013.

On 16 November 2017, Fly Jamaica Airways was given permission by the Government of Guyana to begin direct flights between Guyana and Cuba.

Citing financial problems and lack of aircraft, Fly Jamaica Airways suspended their operations and made all of their staff redundant on 31 March 2019.

== Destinations ==
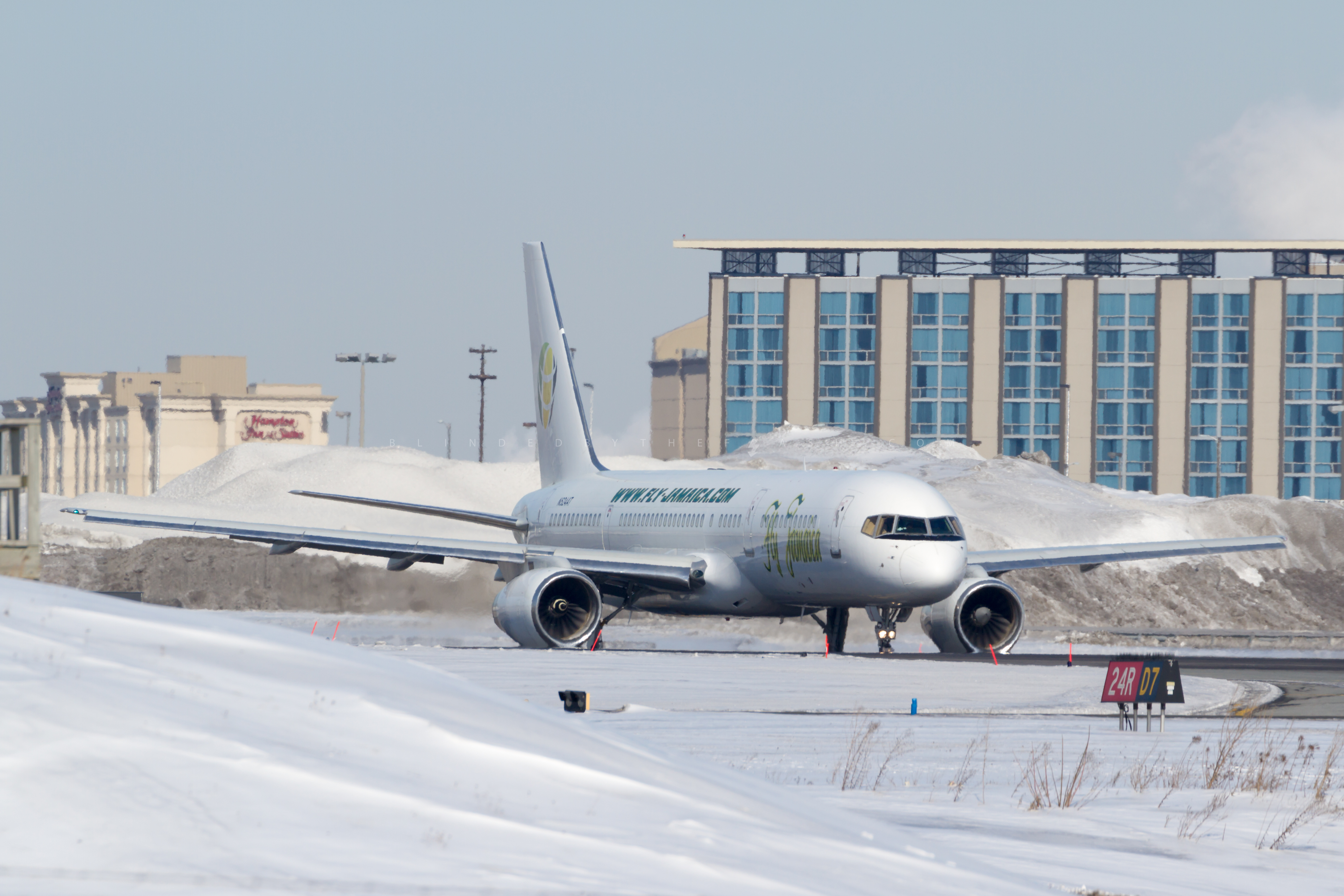
A Fly Jamaica Airways Boeing 757-200 taxiing at Toronto Pearson International Airport. This aircraft crash landed at Cheddi Jagan International Airport in November 2018 and was subsequently written off.

At the time the airline ceased operations in March 2019, Fly Jamaica Airways served the following destinations:

Country	City	Airport	Notes	Refs
Canada	Toronto	Toronto Pearson International Airport		
Guyana	Georgetown	Cheddi Jagan International Airport	Hub	
Jamaica	Kingston	Norman Manley International Airport	Hub	
United States	New York City	John F. Kennedy International Airport		

== Fleet ==
Prior to suspension, Fly Jamaica Airways operated the following aircraft.

Fly Jamaica Airways fleet
Aircraft	In Service	Orders	Passengers			Notes
Aircraft	In Service	Orders	C	Y	Total	Notes
Boeing 767-300ER	1	—	12	234	246	
Total	1	—				

=== Previous Fleet ===
Fly Jamaica Airways previously operated a Boeing 757-200 that was written off after an emergency landing as Fly Jamaica Airways Flight 256.

== Incidents and accidents ==
- On 9 November 2018, Fly Jamaica Airways Flight 256, Boeing 757 (reg. N524AT), returned to Cheddi Jagan International Airport in Timehri, Guyana for an emergency landing, 45 minutes into a flight destined for Toronto. During the landing, the aircraft overran the runway. The incident occurred at approximately 1:30 am. There were approximately 118 passengers and 8 crew members were on board the aircraft. The aircraft was severely damaged. On 16 November 2018, an elderly passenger who had been on the flight died from injuries suffered in a fall at home.
