= BWIA West Indies Airways =

National airline of Trinidad and Tobago (1939–2006)

BWIA West Indies Airways Ltd.

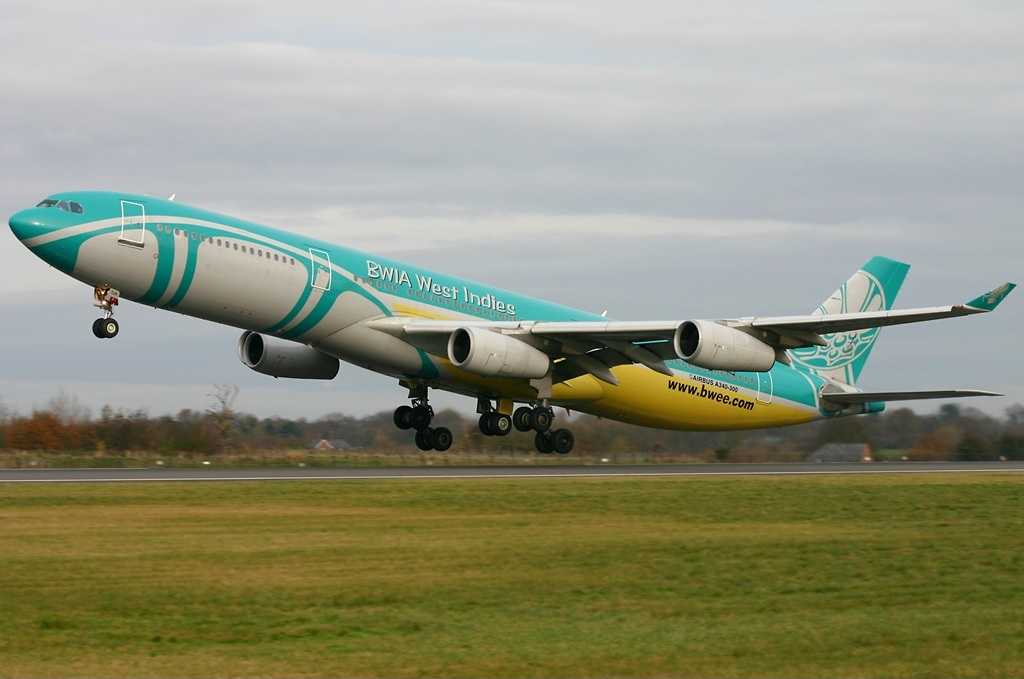
- BWIA Airbus A340-300 in 2004
IATA	ICAO	Call sign
BW	BWA	WEST INDIAN
- Founded: 27 November 1939 (as British West Indian Airlines)
- Commenced operations: 27 November 1940
- Ceased operations: 31 December 2006 (re-organized as Caribbean Airlines)
- Hubs: Port of Spain
- Secondary hubs: Barbados; Georgetown–Cheddi Jagan
- Frequent-flyer program: BWEE Miles
- Subsidiaries: Tobago Express (2001–2006)
- Parent company: 50% ownership by private investors, 15% by employees, and 35% by the Trinidad and Tobago government
- Headquarters: Tunapuna–Piarco, Trinidad and Tobago

BWIA West Indies Airways Limited, known locally as "Bee-Wee" and previously as British West Indian Airways and BWIA International Airways, was the flag carrier of Trinidad and Tobago. At the end of operations, BWIA was the largest airline operating out of the Caribbean, with direct service to the United States, Canada, and the United Kingdom. Its main hub was Piarco International Airport (POS), Piarco, with major hubs at Grantley Adams International Airport (BGI) in Barbados and Cheddi Jagan International Airport (GEO) in Guyana during 2006. It was headquartered in the BWIA Administration Building in Piarco, Tunapuna–Piarco on the island of Trinidad. The company slogan was Sharing our warmth with the world.

The company announced on 8 September 2006 that the airline would be shut down on 31 December 2006. All of the approximately 1700 employees were separated from the company but applied for new contracts with a new entity, Caribbean Airlines.

== History ==
=== Early history ===
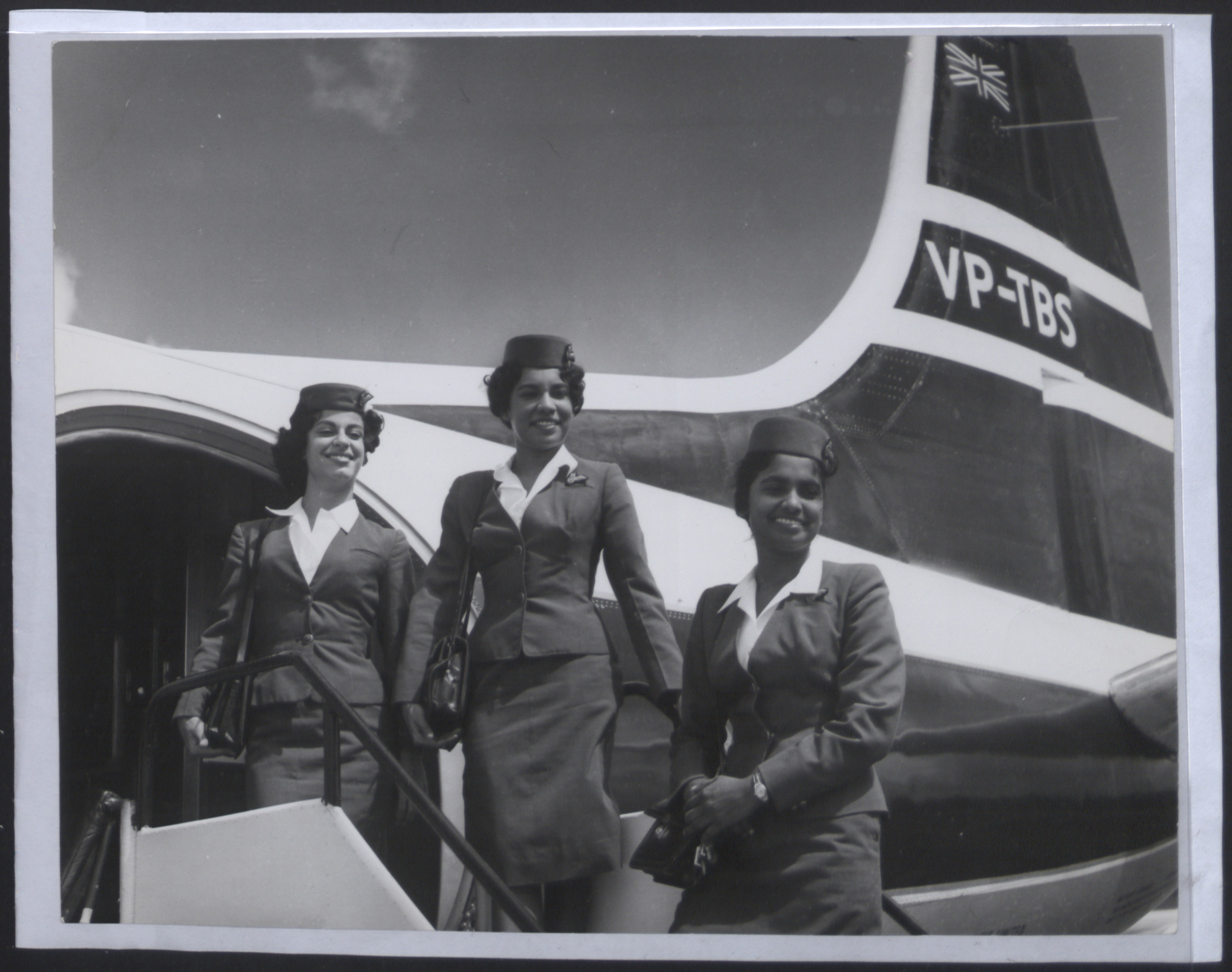
BWIA air hostesses (1955)

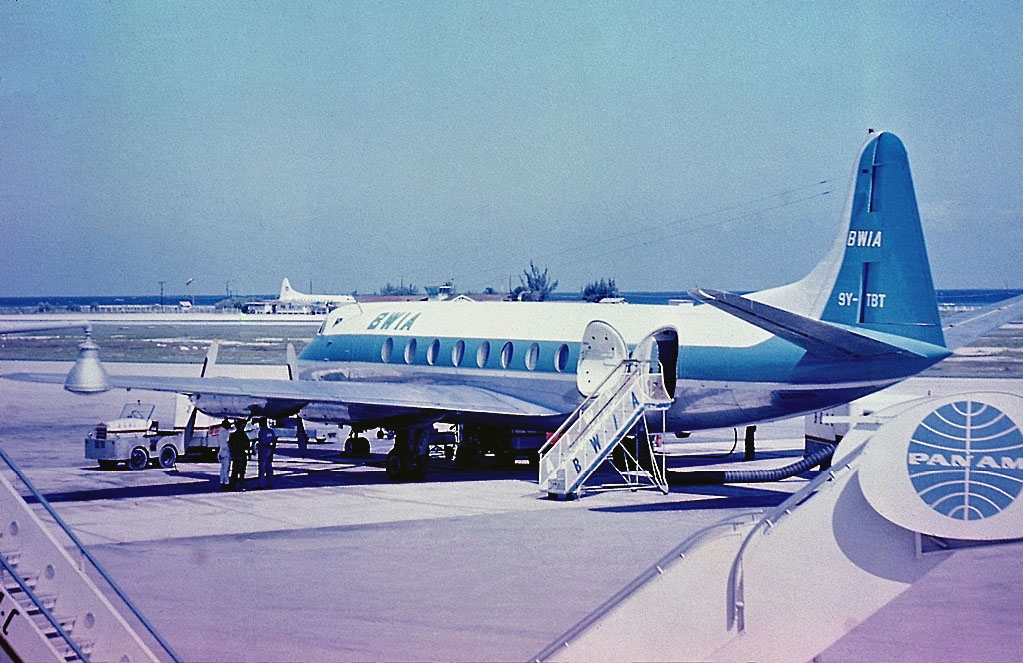
Vickers Viscount at Sangster International Airport in Montego Bay in 1965

British West Indian Airways was established on 27 November 1939 by New Zealander Lowell Yerex. Operations started on 27 November 1940 with a piston powered Lockheed Lodestar twin engine aircraft on daily services between Trinidad and Barbados. By 1942, the airline had three aircraft of this type. In 1947, BWIA was taken over by British South American Airways (BSAA), after a few months operating as British International Air Lines the 'BWIA' name was restored on 24 June 1948 for operating routes among the Caribbean Islands using Vickers Viking twin piston-engined airliners.

In 1949, BSAA merged with British Overseas Airways Corporation and BWIA became a subsidiary of BOAC. Vickers Viscount four engine turboprops were introduced in 1955 with Bristol Britannias leased in 1960 to fly the long-haul route to London, via New York City. In 1960 BWIA had its head office in Port of Spain, Trinidad. On 1 November 1961, the government of Trinidad and Tobago acquired 90% of the shares in the airline and achieved complete ownership by 1967.

For BWIA the jet age began in 1964 with the introduction of new Boeing 727-100 jetliners billed as the Sunjet, which replaced the Viscount turboprops on the New York route. According to its timetable, in 1968 the airline was operating nonstop Boeing 727 flights from New York to Antigua with continuing no change of plane 727 service to Barbados, St. Lucia and Port of Spain as well as nonstop 727 flights from Miami to Grand Cayman and Montego Bay with continuing no change of plane 727 service to Kingston, San Juan, Puerto Rico, Antigua, St. Lucia, Barbados and Port of Spain, and was also serving Caracas, Guyana, Suriname and Tobago with the 727. In early 1971 four second-hand Boeing 707 series 200 airliners were purchased from Braniff International Airways and operated on US and intra-Caribbean services until their disposal in late 1975.

=== Later history ===
The London route was restarted in 1975 using Boeing 707 jets. In 1976 Peter Look Hong replaced Sven-Erik Svanberg as CEO of BWIA. BWIA became BWIA International Airways in 1980 after a merger with Trinidad and Tobago Air Services (which had been formed by the government in June 1974), becoming the national airline. BWIA aircraft livery had the 'Trinidad and Tobago Airways' adjacent to the 'BWIA International' after the merger. The same year also saw the Boeing 707s replaced on the London service with long-range Lockheed L-1011 TriStar 500 wide-body jetliners. In 1986, BWIA bought its first McDonnell Douglas MD-83. The airline also operated McDonnell Douglas DC-9-50 as well as a leased Boeing 747-100 at one point.

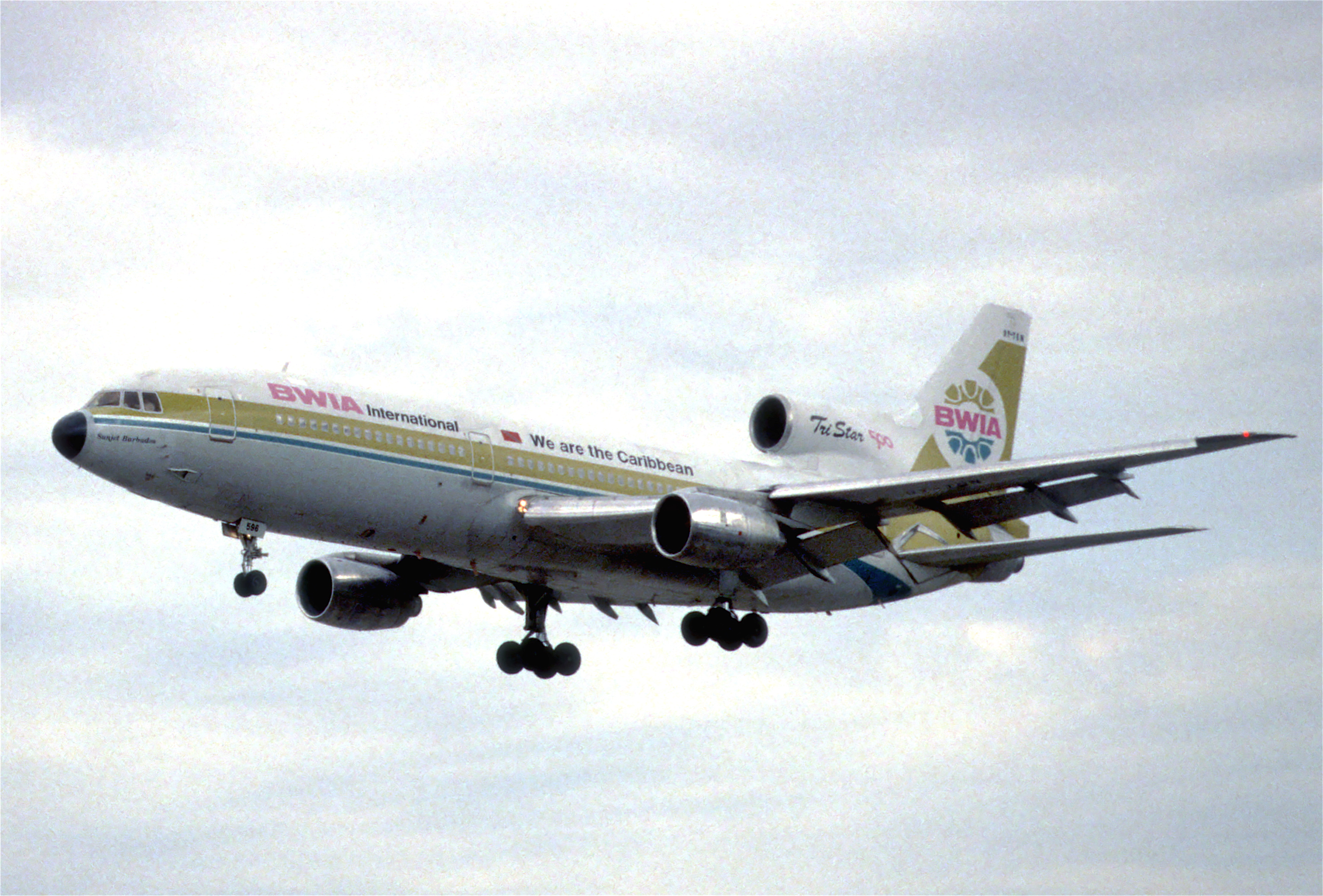
BWIA Lockheed L-1011 TriStar 500 in 1998

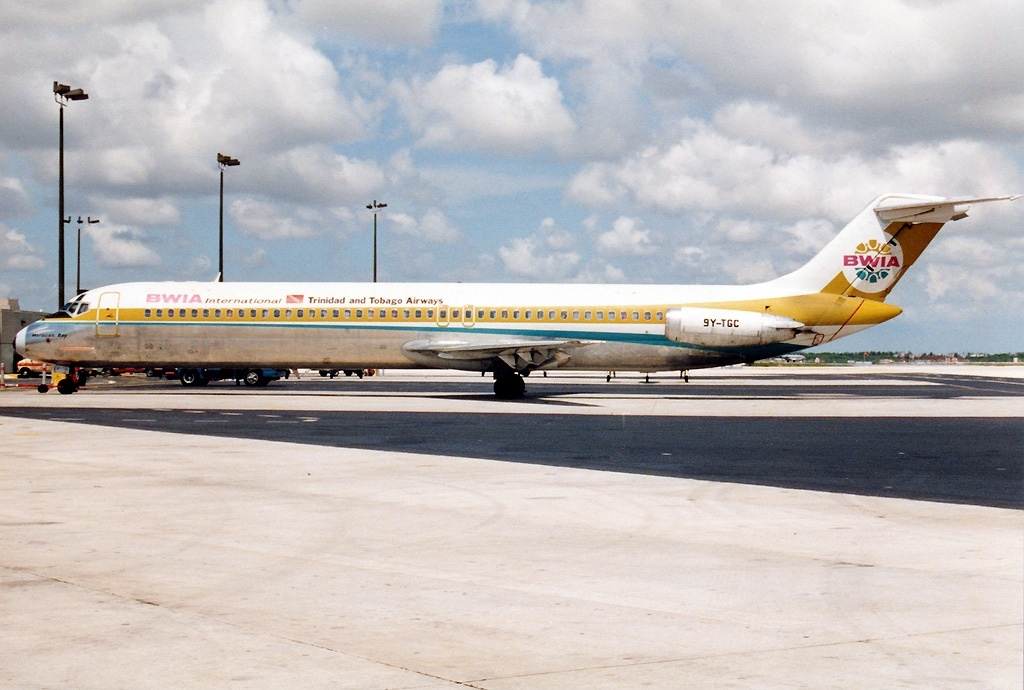
BWIA McDonnell Douglas DC-9-51 in 1989

By 1994, the airline had become partially privatised. A substantial reorganisation of its route network left London and Frankfurt as the only European destinations. The airline ordered Boeing 757 and Boeing 767 aircraft, then canceled the order in favor of Airbus A321 and Airbus A340 jets; in turn, this order was dropped after only two A321s were delivered. On 22 February 1995, the government of Trinidad and Tobago completed the privatisation of BWIA by turning over majority control of the common stock and management of the airline to a private group of US and Caribbean investors.

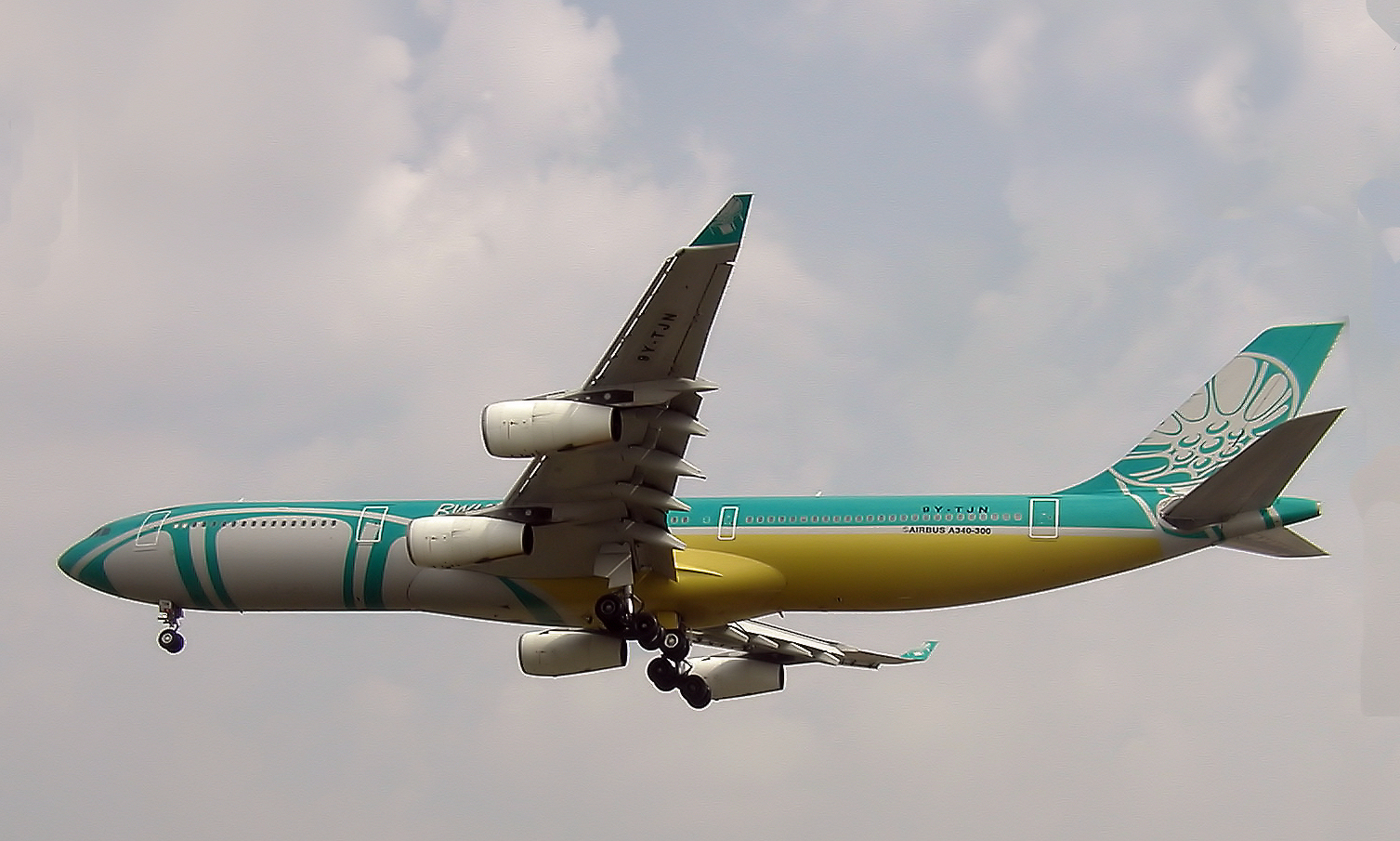
BWIA Airbus A340-300 in 2002

In the early 2000s (decade), BWIA changed its livery to a new Caribbean green and blue color scheme with its famous steelpan trademark, the national musical instrument of its home base. The fleet had been upgraded to seven Boeing 737-800 Next Generation aircraft, two Airbus A340-300s, and two de Havilland Canada Dash 8 Q300 twin turboprop regional aircraft flown by BWIA's sister airline Tobago Express, which provided service on the short hop between Port of Spain and Trinidad's sister island Tobago as well as other destinations in the region.

By 2003, BWIA had become one of the leading Caribbean airlines, carrying over 1.4 million passengers a year with over 600 departures in the Caribbean and another 60 international departures every week. BWIA earned roughly US$276 million per year, employed 2,350 staff, had 70 daily flights, and carried 8,100 tonnes (17,900,000 pounds) of air cargo per year. Its inflight magazine, Caribbean Beat, was well regarded. However, BWIA had also been plagued by losses and had a history of continuous injections of funds from the government of Trinidad and Tobago. The airline had filed for an IPO, although no date was set. The airline was owned by the Government of the Republic of Trinidad and Tobago (75%) and private shareholders (25%) and had 2,588 employees (in January 2005). It also had holdings in other airlines: Tobago Express (45%) and LIAT (23.6%).

On September 8, 2006, BWIA West Indies Airways announced its demise, after failed negotiations with the ACAWU, CATTU, Superintendent's Association and BWIA's management. CEO Peter Davies, who joined BWIA in March 2006, said that a new airline, Caribbean Airlines, based in Trinidad and Tobago, would replace BWIA after 66 years of flying the Caribbean skies. Caribbean Airlines remains in current operation.

BWIA's Pilots were represented by the Trinidad and Tobago Airline Pilots Association (TTALPA), which is affiliated to IFALPA. TTALPA is also part of the regional Caribbean Airline Pilots Association (C-ALPA). The other recognised Unions at BWIA were: Airline Superintendents Association; the Aviation, Communication and Allied Workers Union, which represented ground staff and flight attendants, and the Communication, Transport and General Workers Union which organised middle management and engineers.

== Destinations ==
BWIA served the following destinations during its existence although not all of these destinations were served at the same time:

North America

- Canada
  - Toronto – Toronto Pearson International Airport
- United States
  - Baltimore - Baltimore/Washington International Thurgood Marshall Airport
  - Miami - Miami International Airport
  - New York City – John F. Kennedy International Airport

Europe

- Germany
  - Frankfurt – Frankfurt Airport
- Sweden
  - Stockholm – Stockholm Arlanda Airport
- Switzerland
  - Zürich - Zurich Airport
- United Kingdom
  - London – Heathrow Airport
  - Manchester – Manchester Airport

Caribbean

- Antigua and Barbuda
  - St. John's, Antigua – V. C. Bird International Airport
- Bahamas
  - Nassau – Lynden Pindling International Airport
- Barbados
  - Bridgetown – Grantley Adams International Airport (Hub)
- Belize
  - Belize City - Philip S.W. Goldson International Airport
- Jamaica
  - Kingston – Norman Manley International Airport
  - Montego Bay - Sangster International Airport
- Cayman Islands
  - Grand Cayman - Owen Roberts International Airport
- Netherlands Antilles
  - Aruba - Queen Beatrix International Airport
  - St. Maarten – Princess Juliana International Airport
- Puerto Rico
  - San Juan – Luis Muñoz Marín International Airport
- St. Kitts
  - Robert L. Bradshaw International Airport
- St. Lucia
  - Hewanorra International Airport
  - Vigie Airport (now George F.L. Charles Airport)
- Trinidad and Tobago
  - Port of Spain, Trinidad – Piarco International Airport (Main Hub)
  - Tobago – Crown Point International Airport

South America

- Guyana
  - Georgetown – Cheddi Jagan International Airport (Hub)
- Suriname
  - Paramaribo – Johan Adolf Pengel International Airport
- Venezuela
  - Caracas – Simón Bolívar International Airport

Through a codeshare agreement with United Airlines, it offered connecting service to Boston, Denver, Chicago–O'Hare, Los Angeles, San Francisco and Seattle/Tacoma. BWIA also had an alliance with another Caribbean airline, LIAT, with both carriers providing combined service to over 30 regional destinations.

== Fleet ==
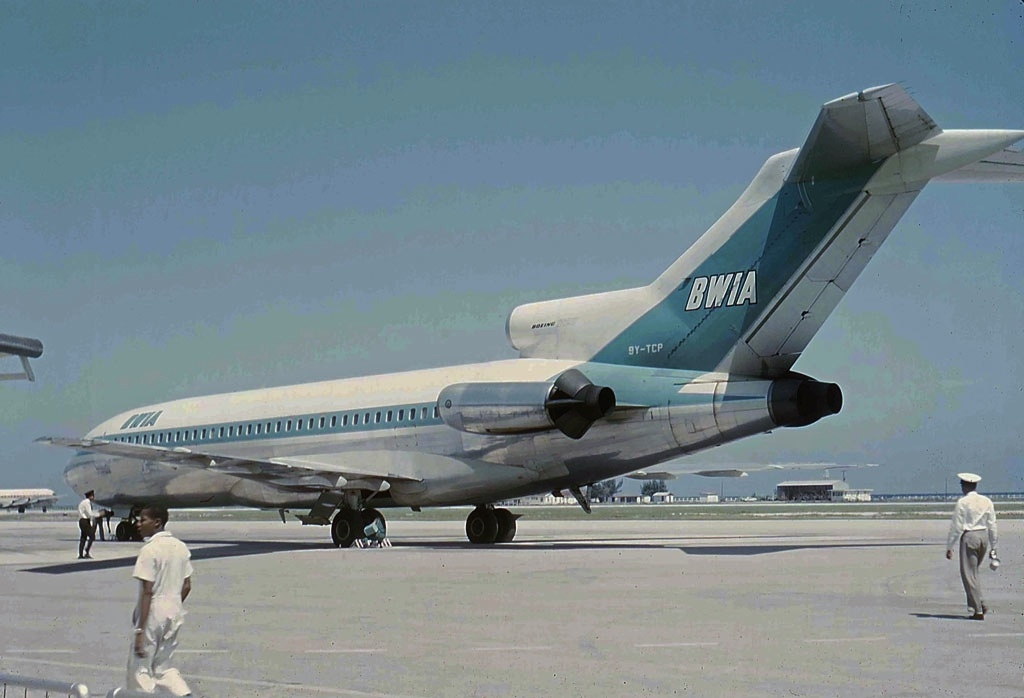
BWIA Boeing 727-100 "Sunjet" in 1965

BWIA Boeing 707 in 1978

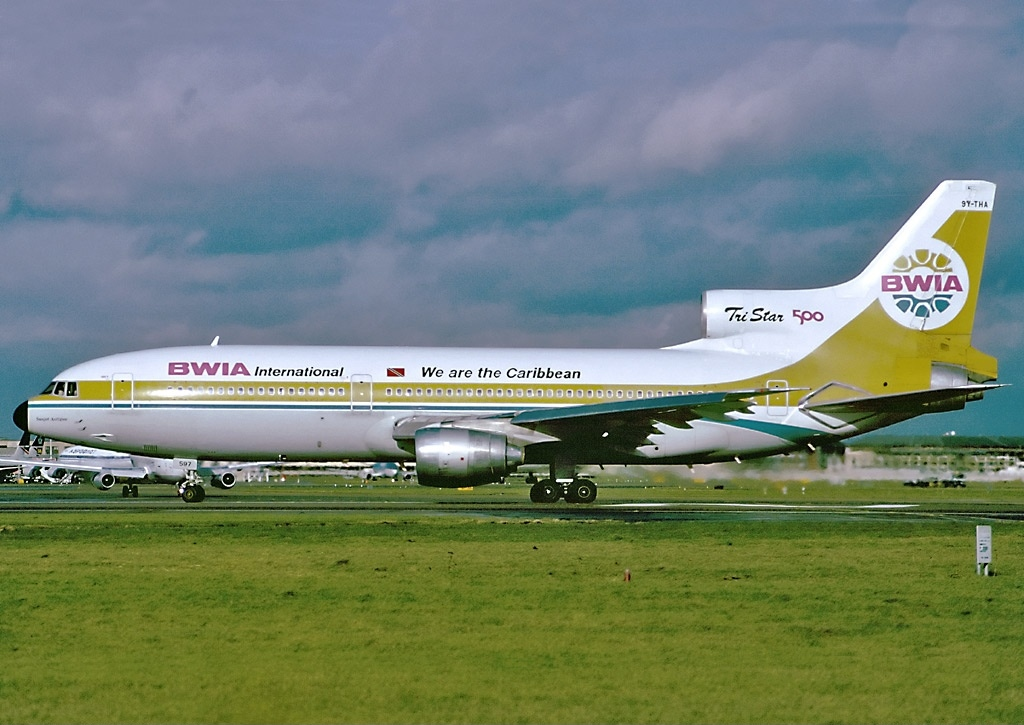
BWIA Lockheed L-1011 Tristar (series 500) in 1995

The BWIA fleet consisted of the following aircraft in August 2006:

BWIA fleet
Aircraft	In service	Passengers			Notes
Aircraft	In service	C	Y	Total	Notes
Boeing 737-800	7	16	138	154	Short-Medium Haul
Airbus A340-300	2	32	252	284	Medium-Long Haul
Total	9				

In addition, BWIA's regional airline affiliate, Tobago Express, operated de Havilland Canada DHC-8 Q300 Dash 8 turboprop aircraft.

=== Former fleet ===
The following aircraft types have been operated by BWIA:

BWIA former fleet
Aircraft	Total	Introduced	Retired	Notes
Airbus A321-100	2	1996	1997	
ATR 72-200	2	2004	2006	Leased from Cimber Air.
Boeing 707-120	2	1968	1977	
Boeing 707-220	4	1971	1976	
Boeing 707-320	9	1974	1983	
Boeing 720	1	1966	1967	Leased from Aer Lingus.
Boeing 727-100	4	1964	1971	
Boeing 737-700	1	1999	2000	
Boeing 747-100	1	1987	1987	Leased from Cargolux.
Bristol Britannia	2	Unknown	Unknown	Leased from BOAC.
De Havilland Canada Dash 8-100	1	1992	1993	Leased from Air Ontario.
De Havilland Dash 8-300	5	1993	2006	
Douglas C-47A Skytrain	5	1952	1975	
Douglas DC-6	3	1971	1980	
Douglas DC-7C	1	1970	1972	
Douglas DC-8-54F	2	1992	1992	All-cargo freighter leased from Agro Air.
Hawker Siddeley HS 748	7	1969	1987	
Lockheed Hudson	3	1944	1946	
Lockheed Model 18 Lodestar	5	1945	1952	
Lockheed L-1011 TriStar 500	5	1980	2004	
McDonnell Douglas DC-9-32	1	2004	2004	Leased from JAT Airways.
McDonnell Douglas DC-9-34CF	1	1978	1986	Transferred to Aeropostal.
McDonnell Douglas MD-82	1	1985	1985	Leased from Frontier Airlines.
McDonnell Douglas MD-83	9	1986	2003	
Short SA.6 Sealand	2	1949	1950	
Vickers Viking	8	1948	1958	
Vickers Viscount 700	9	1955	1970	

== Awards ==
- 1995, 1996, 1997 - The "Caribbean's Leading Airline" - by the World Travel Awards

== Bibliography ==
- Roach, John (2003). Jet Airliner Production List Volume 1 - Boeing. The Aviation Hobby Shop. ISBN 0-907178-97-9.
