= Trinidad and Tobago Airline Pilots Association =

TTALPA
- Trinidad and Tobago Airline Pilots Association
- Headquarters: 35A Brunton Road, Saint James, Trinidad and Tobago
- Location: Trinidad and Tobago
- Key people: Captain Paul Foster, Chairperson
- Affiliations: Caribbean ALPA, IFALPA
- Website: TTALPA

The Trinidad and Tobago Airline Pilots Association is a trade union in Trinidad and Tobago with members in the former BWIA and Tobago Express, now Caribbean Airlines. The Trinidad and Tobago Airline Pilots Association (TTALPA) is the registered, Recognised Majority Union and bargaining unit for Pilots in Trinidad and Tobago. TTALPA was officially registered in 1972 under the Trade Unions Ordinance and pursuant to the provision of Section 86(1) of the Industrial Relations Act 1972.

TTALPA is a membership organisation and as such, is funded by the dues paid by its members. Persons who hold a Trinidad & Tobago Pilots Licence are eligible for membership in TTALPA and this includes helicopter pilots.

TTALPA has 4 committees and 1 advisory committee which focus on the wide spectrum of technical and professional issues that face pilots as a profession.

1. Air Safety & Training Committee

The Airline Safety and Training Committee’s (AS&T) core mandate is to improve air safety, ensure that all safety complaints and investigations result in the improvement of safety levels, improve the working environment of the individual pilot considering environmental aspects and contribute to the development of prevention policies. AS&T monitors the application of any safety recommendations put forth by the airline, identifies and communicates unsafe events and promotes the development of safety programmes. It is currently chaired by First Officer Aleena Ali.

Negotiations Committee

The Negotiations Committee was formed to spearhead negotiations for the Collective Agreement between Caribbean Airlines Limited (CAL) and TTALPA’s members. Both parties to this agreement recognise their common interest in the promotion of the business of CAL and declare jointly and separately that they will use their best efforts to protect and further the well-being of the company. TTALPA agrees that it will cooperate with CAL, support its efforts to ensure full productivity and will lend support in its efforts to eliminate waste and to improve efficiency and maintain its levels of safety. Both parties recognise also the need to ensure that adequate productivity is maintained by the pilots.

Hotel Committee

Members of this committee work together with Caribbean Airlines Limited (CAL) to review hotel selection and ensure that they meet with the necessary safety requirements. The committee also supervises the sections of the Collective Bargaining Agreement with regard to restful lodging, ancillary services, crew lounges and transportation of pilots, to which they, CAL, must comply. Chaired by Larry Imamshah

Prefbid Committee

The Preferential Bidding (PrefBid) Committee is tasked with reviewing schedules put out by the airline to ensure that their contractual compliance is met. This committee meets as necessary to investigate and discuss any grievances that may arise pertaining to scheduling and to arrive at potential areas of agreement in the flight bidding process and help improve efficiency in pilot schedules. The PrefBid Committee acts in an advisory role to TTALPA member pilots regarding scheduling issues and is also charged with the implementation and fair practices of a preferential bidding system

Professional Standards Committee

The Professional Standards Committee promotes and maintains the highest degree of professional conduct among TALPA pilots. The main goal of this Committee is to enhance the margin of safety in daily flight operations, which is the primary concern and responsibility. It will also protect and enhance the standing of the profession including address problems of a professional or ethical nature involving pilots; resolve cases of pilot misconduct that affect flight deck safety and/or professionalism; resolve conflicts between pilots that may affect flight deck professionalism, etc.

== See also ==
- List of trade unions
