= Caribbean Airlines Flight 523 =

2011 aviation accident in Guyana

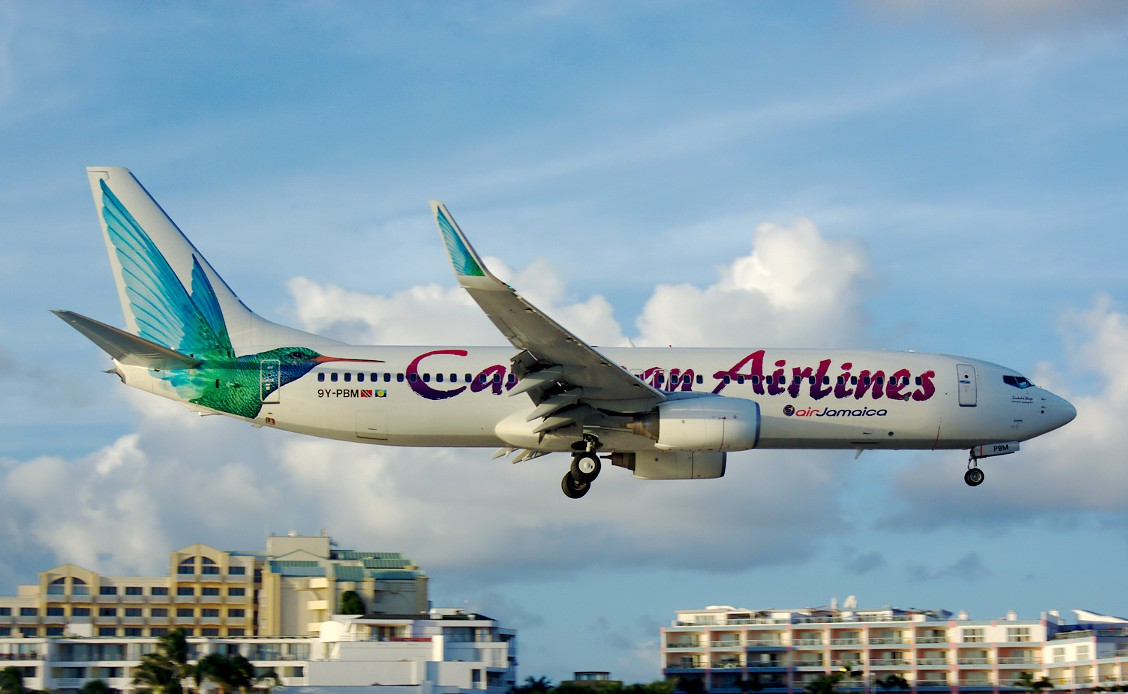
- 9Y-PBM, the aircraft involved in the accident, pictured in 2010

Accident
- Date: 30 July 2011
- Summary: Runway overrun on landing due to pilot error
- Site: Cheddi Jagan International Airport, Georgetown, Guyana; 06°29′54″N 058°15′14″W

Aircraft
- Aircraft type: Boeing 737-8BK
- Operator: Caribbean Airlines
- IATA flight No.: BW523
- ICAO flight No.: BWA523
- Call sign: CARIBBEAN 523
- Registration: 9Y-PBM
- Flight origin: John F. Kennedy International Airport, New York City, United States
- Stopover: Piarco International Airport, Port of Spain, Trinidad
- Destination: Cheddi Jagan International Airport, Georgetown, Guyana
- Occupants: 163
- Passengers: 157
- Crew: 6
- Fatalities: 0
- Injuries: 7
- Survivors: 163

Caribbean Airlines Flight 523 was a passenger flight that overran the runway at Cheddi Jagan International Airport, Georgetown, Guyana, on 30 July 2011. Out of the 163 occupants onboard, no one was killed, but seven people were injured. The aircraft involved, a Boeing 737-800, was operating Caribbean Airlines' scheduled international service from John F. Kennedy Airport, New York, to Georgetown, Guyana.

== Background ==
=== Aircraft ===
The aircraft involved was a Boeing 737-8BK, MSN 29635, registered as 9Y-PBM, that was built by Boeing Commercial Airplanes in 2007. It logged about 14861 airframe hours and was equipped with two CFM56-7B26/3 engines.

=== Crew ===
In command was a 52-year-old captain who had logged about 9600 hours of flying time, 5000 of which were logged on the Boeing 737-800. His co-pilot, aged 23, had logged 1400 hours of flying time, including about 350 hours on the Boeing 737-800.

== Accident ==
The aircraft failed to stop in rainy weather, overrunning the runway at 01:32 local time (05:32 UTC), crashing through the perimeter fence. The aircraft stopped 100 metres (330 ft) past the end of runway 06 after it went over a road and broke into two sections.

There were 157 passengers and 6 crew on the aircraft. There were no fatalities, and serious injuries were two passengers suffering broken legs. The majority of the injured were treated at Diamond Diagnostic Hospital then sent onto Georgetown Public Hospital, where 35 passengers were treated for leg, back and neck injuries. The aircraft was damaged beyond repair. The accident represents the ninth hull loss of a Boeing 737-800.

Trinidad and Tobago's Prime Minister Kamla Persad-Bissessar flew to Guyana to assess the situation, because the government of Trinidad and Tobago owns Caribbean Airlines. Guyana's emergency response team appeared at the accident scene two hours after the incident. Further officials from the Trinidad and Tobago Civil Aviation Authority (TTCAA) and U.S. National Transportation Safety Board (NTSB) were invited to Guyana to aid in investigations.

== Investigation ==
The Guyana Civil Aviation Authority (GCAA) headed the technical investigation, with assistance from the NTSB and the TTCAA. The Government Information Agency (GINA) Guyana reported the probable cause to be pilot error, stating: "The cause of the accident was the aircraft touching down far beyond the touchdown zone due to the captain maintaining excess power during the flare and not using the airplane's full deceleration capacity, resulting in the aircraft over running the pavement and fracturing the fuselage."

== Aftermath ==
The captain remained employed by Caribbean Airlines but was moved to the role of a first officer. The first officer left Caribbean Airlines in 2012.

== See also ==
- Fly Jamaica Airways Flight 256, a runway excursion at the same airport, on the same runway, ending in the same spot, seven years later
- Air India Express Flight 812, another Boeing 737-800 that suffered a runway excursion due to pilot error, with fatalities.
- American Airlines Flight 331, also experienced a runway excursion due to inclement weather and pilot error.
