= Flight 256 =

Flight 256 may refer to:

- Intercontinental de Aviación Flight 256, crashed on 11 January 1995
- Fly Jamaica Airways Flight 256, crashed on 9 November 2018
