= Bahamas Airline Pilots Association =

BALPA
- Bahamas Airline Pilots Association
- Headquarters: Workers Housem, Harold Road, P.O. Box CB13138, Nassau, Bahamas
- Location: Bahamas
- Affiliations: Caribbean ALPA, IFALPA
- Website: bahamasalpa.com

The Bahamas Airline Pilots Association is a trade union in the Bahamas.

== See also ==
- List of trade unions
