= Guy-America Airways =

IATA	ICAO	Call sign
GK	GAM	GUY AMERICA
- Founded: 1981; 45 years ago
- Commenced operations: June 1981; 45 years ago
- Ceased operations: 1984; 42 years ago
- Hubs: John F. Kennedy International Airport
- Fleet size: 8
- Destinations: 2
- Headquarters: Queens, New York, United States
- Key people: Anthony Tirri (Founder)

Guy-America Airways, Inc. was an airline operating scheduled passenger flights between New York City and Georgetown, Guyana. For a very short time, the company flew to Europe under the name American Overseas Airlines operating Boeing 707 jetliners.

According to its September 1, 1981 timetable, the airline operated three round trip nonstop flights a week between New York City and Georgetown and was offering "the only non-stop" service.

== Destinations ==
- Guyana
  - Georgetown (Cheddi Jagan International Airport)
- United States
  - New York City (John F. Kennedy International Airport) Hub

== Fleet ==
- 4 Boeing 707-123B N519GA, N7583A, N7586A, N7588A
- 4 Boeing 707-321B N707GE, N498GA, N893PA (leased), N895PA (leased)
- 1 Douglas DC-8-62 N39307 (never in commercial service)

== See also ==
- List of defunct airlines of the United States
