= Trinidad and Tobago Air Services =

Airline of Trinidad and Tobago

Trinidad and Tobago Air Services (TTAS)
| IATA | ICAO | Call sign |
|---|---|---|
| HU | — | — |
- Founded: 1974
- Commenced operations: 1974
- Ceased operations: 1980 (merged with BWIA West Indies Airways)
- Hubs: Piarco International Airport
- Destinations: 2
- Headquarters: Port of Spain, Trinidad and Tobago

Trinidad and Tobago Air Services also known as the TTAS, was an Air Bridge service for Trinidad and Tobago. It was based at Piarco International Airport, Trinidad and Tobago.

== History ==
In 1974, TTAS was founded and owned by the Government of Trinidad and Tobago and the TTAS was the national flag carrier of Trinidad and Tobago. In 1980, Trinidad and Tobago Air Services were merged with BWIA International Airways thus ending the TTAS operation.

== Fleet ==
The Trinidad and Tobago Air Services fleet included the following aircraft:

Tobago Express fleet
| Aircraft | Total | Passengers | Type |
|---|---|---|---|
| Hawker Siddeley HS 748 | | 52 | Prop aircraft |
| McDonnell Douglas DC-9-50 | | 133 | Jet aircraft |

== Services ==
Domestic scheduled destinations served by the air bridge service were Port of Spain, Trinidad (POS) and Scarborough, Tobago (TAB).

=== Destinations ===
- Trinidad and Tobago
  - Trinidad
    - Piarco International Airport (Base)
  - Tobago
    - Arthur Napoleon Raymond Robinson International Airport

The 15 December 1976 Trinidad and Tobago Air Services timetable lists up to eight round trip flights a day operated with Hawker Siddeley HS 748 prop aircraft or McDonnell Douglas DC-9-50 jet aircraft between Port of Spain and Tobago.

Trinidad and Tobago Air Services McDonnell Douglas DC-9-50 jetliners were also operated in association with BWIA International Airways on international services with these flights being listed in the 15 September 1976 BWIA system timetable. Routings operated with the DC-9-50 at this time included Port of Spain (POS) - Tobago (TAB) - Antigua (ANU) - Miami (MIA) flown round trip twice a week and Port of Spain - Tobago - Caracas (CCS) also flown round trip twice a week.

== See also ==
- BWIA International Airways
