= Caribbean Airline Pilots Association =

Caribbean ALPA
- Caribbean Airline Pilots Association
- Founded: 1997
- Location: Caribbean
- Members: 730 (2002)
- Affiliations: IFALPA

The Caribbean Airline Pilots Association is a trade union federation that represents airline pilots organisations in the Caribbean region.

Founded in 1997, with the support and assistance of the International Federation of Air Line Pilots' Associations (IFALPA), the organisation was a response to the recognition that the airline industry was rapidly evolving towards airline globalisation and an indication of this was the proposal that one regional airline be created. Although this has not yet happened, airlines within the region have gone through a series of financial crises which confirm the original perspectives that led to the formation of Caribbean ALPA.

== Member Organisations ==
- Bahamas Airline Pilots Association
- Cayman Airline Pilots Association
- Jamaica Airline Pilots Association
- Leeward Islands Airline Pilots Association
- Trinidad and Tobago Airline Pilots Association
- VNV-NA (Netherlands Antilles)
- Suriname Pilots Association (Suriname)
- VVA (Aruba).

== See also ==
- List of trade unions
