= Aviation, Communication and Allied Workers Union =

Trade union in Trinidad and Tobago

ACAWU
- Aviation, Communication and Allied Workers Union
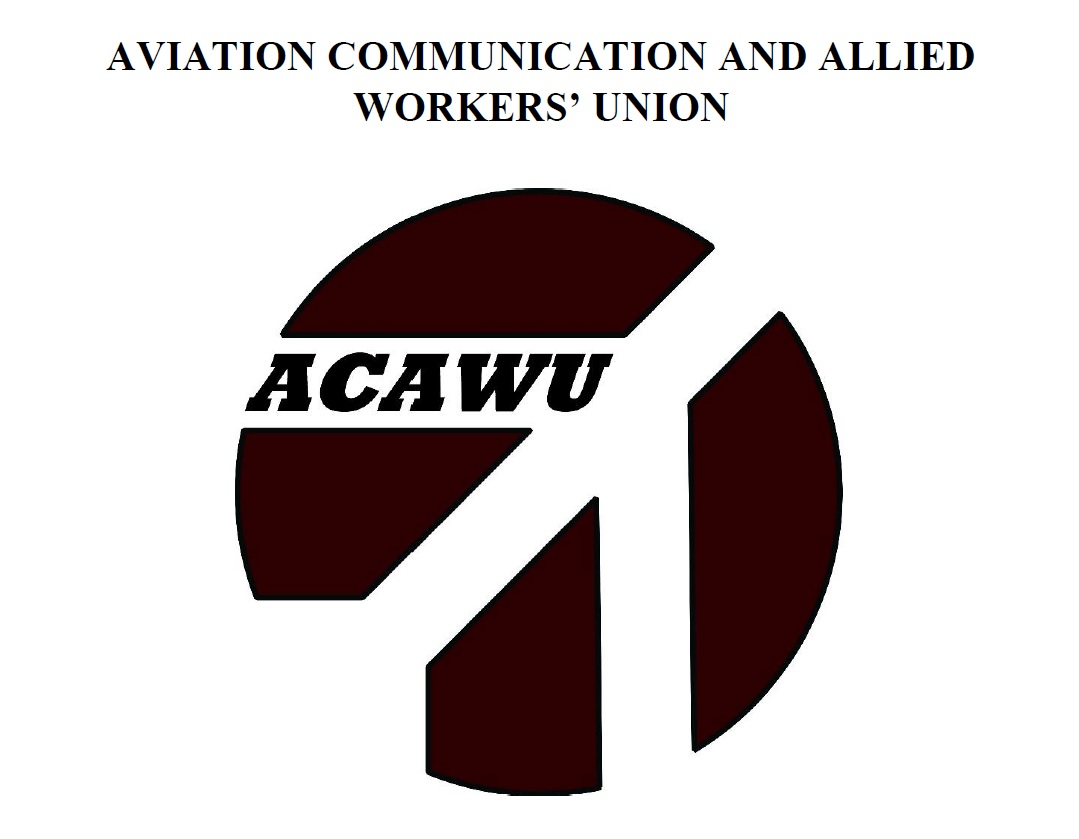
- Headquarters: Tacarigua, Trinidad and Tobago
- Location: Trinidad and Tobago
- Members: Approx 700 in 2006, Approx 100 in 2022
- Key people: Nwannia Sorzano, President General
- Affiliations: NATUC

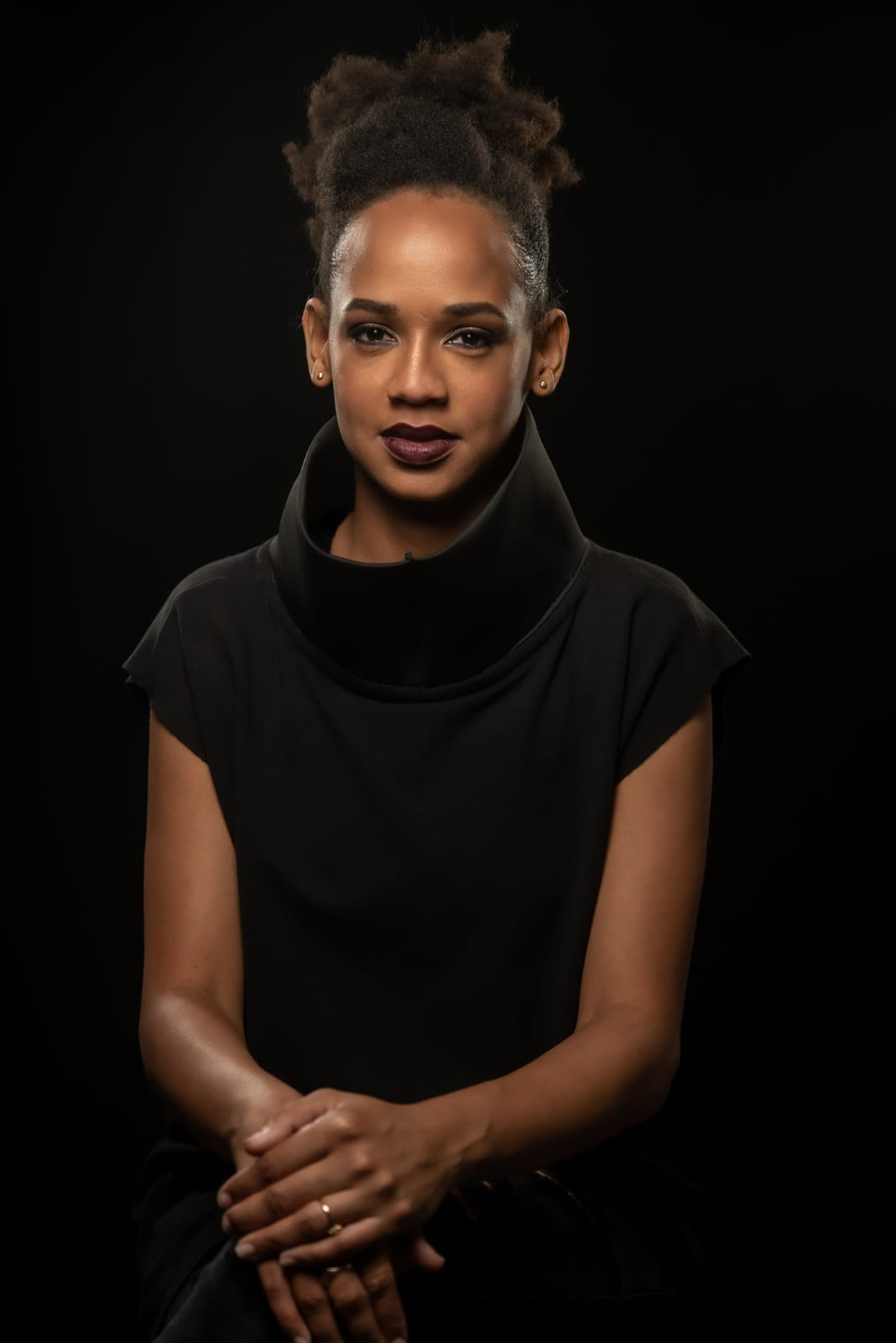
President Nwannia Sorzano

The Aviation, Communication and Allied Workers Union (ACAWU) is a trade union in Trinidad and Tobago, most of whose members worked for BWIA West Indies Airways. BWIA West Indies Airways ceased operations on the 31 December 2006 and became Caribbean Airlines.

ACAWU has fought for the rights of Aviation workers for many years under the leadership of former Secretary General Peter Farmer.

ACAWU's President General is Nwannia Sorzano after a Biennial National Convention and election held in early 2022. This was the first Biennial National Convention and Election for over four years and the first in many years to elect a full slate of candidates to fill all positions under the ACAWU Constitution .

Nwannia Sorzano appeared at the May Day Parade representing ACAWU in 2022 and was photographed by the Trinidad and Tobago Newsday

President General Nwannia Sorzano also spoke in support of the position of ACAWU in relation to recent wage negotiations and prospective nationwide protests in May of 2022 which was aired on the TTT Tv station in Trinidad and Tobago

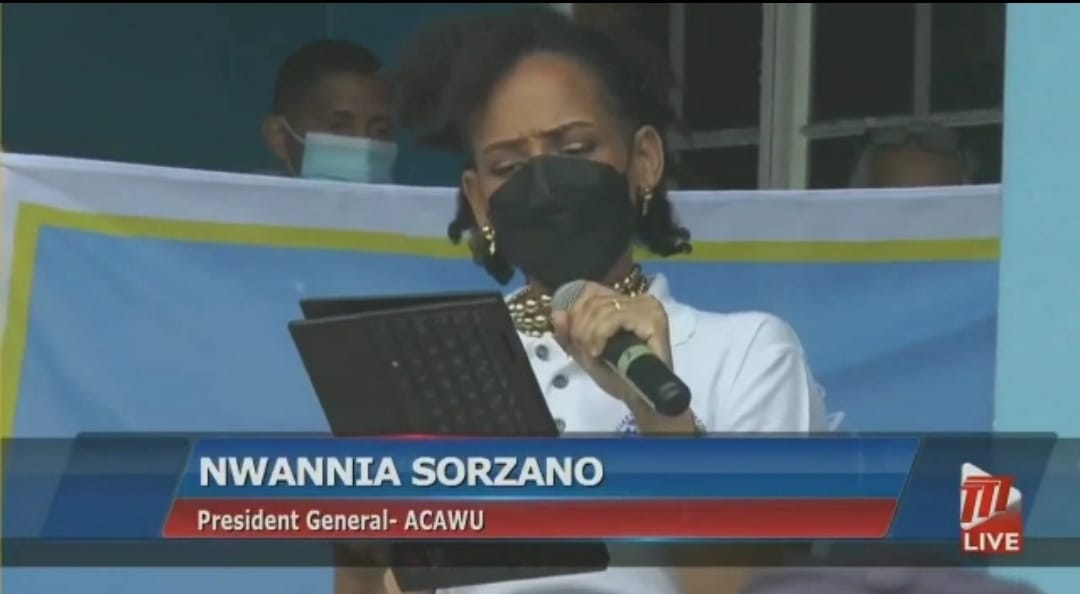
Nwannia Sorzano President General ACAWU on TV

== See also ==
- List of trade unions
