= South Dakota Circuit =

Racing track in Timehri, Guyana

- Location: Timehri, Demerara-Mahaica, Guyana
- Coordinates: 6°29′20.99″N 58°15′7.10″W
- FIA Grade: none
- Opened: May 1956; 69 years ago

Original Circuit
- Length: 3.067 km (1.910 miles)
- Turns: 8

Short Circuit (2022–present)
- Length: 1.600 km (0.994 miles)
- Turns: 13

South Dakota Circuit is a permanent motor racing track in Timehri, Guyana. It is operated by the Guyana Motor Racing & Sports Club.

== History ==
The circuit was opened in 1956 under British rule as a permanent venue for motorcycle racers, who had previously been using No. 63 Beach on the border with Dutch Suriname. The track was formed from a former World War II airstrip used by the Americans during the North Africa campaign, and the circuit's name was taken from the military aircraft of the same name. The circuit played host to a variety of Caribbean car and motorcycle championships, with the two-wheeled discipline in particular bringing in British teams and riders well into the 1970s. As a result of the oil crises of the 1970s and the increasingly socialist policies of Prime Minister Forbes Burnham, racing entered a dormant period in the country in the mid-1970s and only restarted in 1988. The circuit was significantly upgraded at this time, encouraging riders from North America to compete. In 1990, a Caribbean Motor Racing Championship was held for the first time, later morphing into the Caribbean Race of Champions event that is still held today.

By the late-2000s, the circuit had fallen into disrepair. In the early-2020s, the Guyanese government allocated funding for the circuit to be upgraded, intended to meet FIA Grade 3 status (yet to be graded as of October 2023), with works completed in November 2022.
