= Guyana Civil Aviation Authority =

Guyanese aviation government agency

The Guyana Civil Aviation Authority (GCAA) is a government agency of Guyana overseeing civil aviation. Its headquarters are in Georgetown. The agency investigates aviation accidents and incidents.

== See also ==
- Caribbean Airlines Flight 523
