= Sven-Erik Svanberg =

Swedish airline chief executive

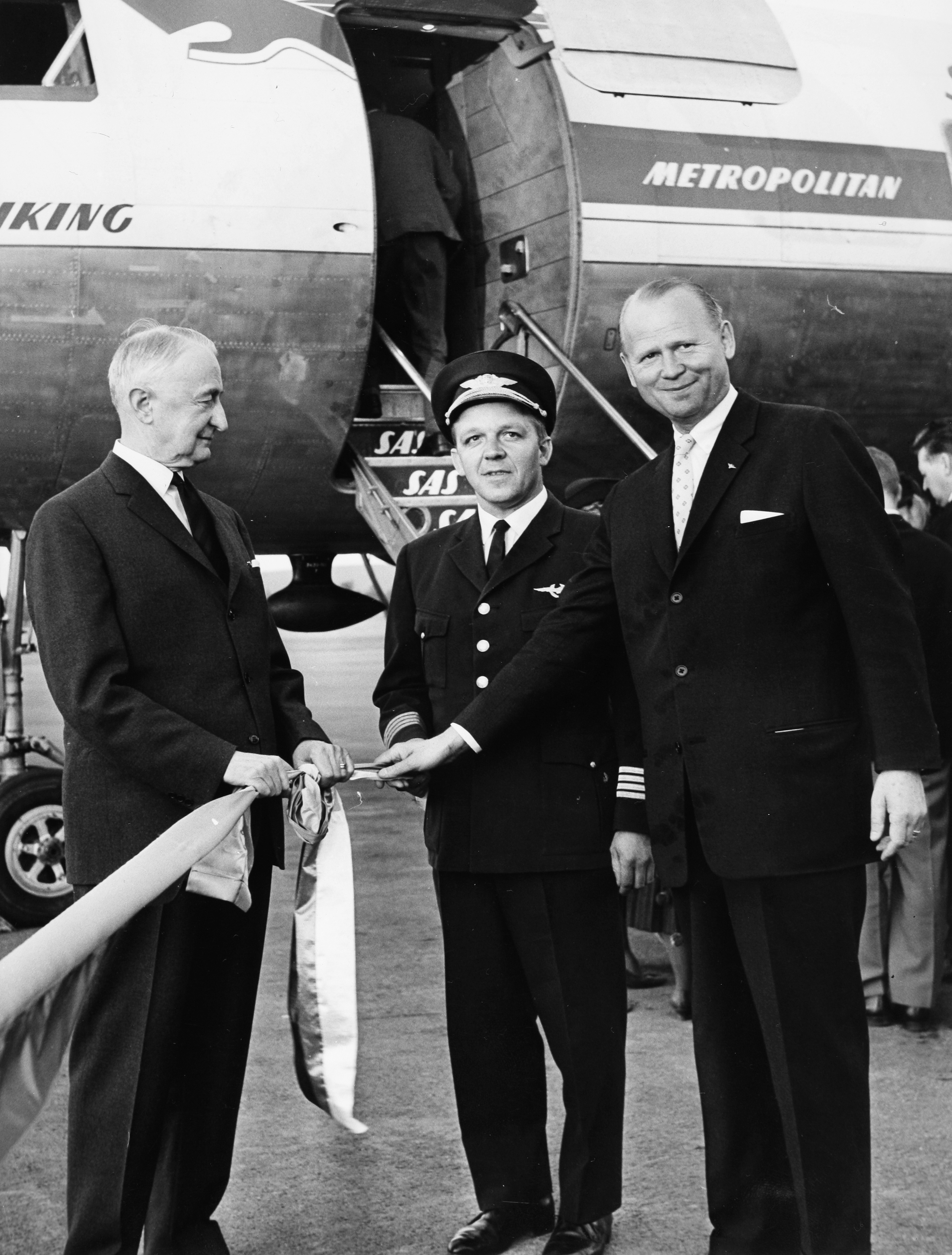
- Sven-Erik Svanberg (right) at Bardufoss Airport, June 1963.
- Born: 7 March 1914; Karlstad, Sweden
- Died: 16 September 2004 (aged 90)
- Education: Stockholm School of Economics
- Occupation: Airline executive
- Years active: 1936–1981
- Employer: Scandinavian Airlines
- Spouse: Marianne Fick (m. 1938)
- Children: 3
- Parent(s): Bert Svanberg; Linnea Östberg

Sven-Erik Svanberg (7 March 1914 – 16 September 2004) was a Swedish airline chief executive.

== Early life ==
Svanberg was born on 7 March 1914 in Karlstad, Sweden, the son of managing director Bert Svanberg and his wife Linnea (née Östberg). He passed studentexamen in 1932 and graduated with an administrative degree (kansliexamen) in 1934. Svanberg graduated from Stockholm School of Economics in 1936.

== Career ==
Svanberg was employed at the National Social Insurance Institution from 1936 to 1941 and was secretary in the Statens besparberedning from 1941 to 1942. Svanberg was an expert in the Military Expedition Services Committee (Militära expeditionstjänstkommittén) from 1942 to 1943. Svanberg was first administrative officer at the Royal Swedish Air Force Materiel Administration in 1943 and human resources manager at Scandinavian Airlines from 1946 to 1951. He was managing director of the Retail Employers' Organization (Handelns arbetsgivarorganisation) from 1951 to 1956 and member of its national board from 1956. Svanberg was human resources director at Scandinavian Airlines from 1956 to 1962 and member of the Märsta Delegation from 1958.

Svanberg was also a board member of the Retail Employers' Organization, Linjeflyg, Swedish Tourist Traffic Association (Svenska turisttrafikförbundet) and the Stockholm Tourist Traffic Association (Stockholms turisttrafikförbund). Svanberg was managing director of Region Sweden at Scandinavian Airlines from 1962 to 1972 and CEO of British West Indies Airways from 1973 to 1975. Svanberg became CEO of Nyman & Schultz/Nordisk resebureau AB in 1976 and was managing director of Scandinavian Airlines from 1977 to 1979. From 1981 he was a senior partner of Scandinavian Aviation Consultants Scanavia.

== Personal life ==
In 1938, Svanberg married Marianne Fick (1916–2005), the daughter of Captain Henrik Fick and Sigrid (née Frenckell). He was the father of Ulla (born 1939), Annika (born 1944), and Gunilla (born 1947).

== Death ==
Svanberg died on 16 September 2004. He was interred on 16 December 2004 at Lidingö Cemetery.
