= Communication, Transport and General Workers Union =

Trade union in Trinidad & Tobago

CATTU
- Communication, Transport and General Workers Union
- Headquarters: 43 Fifth Street, Barataria, Trinidad and Tobago
- Location: Trinidad and Tobago
- Key people: Raymond Small, Chairperson; Dave Smith, General Secretary
- Website: CATTU web site

The Communication, Transport and General Workers Union (CATTU) is a trade union in Trinidad and Tobago with most of its members in the former airline of BWIA.

== See also ==
- List of trade unions
