= Timehri =

- Village
- Location in Guyana
- Coordinates: 6.508°N 58.252°W
- Country: Guyana
- Region: Demerara-Mahaica

Population (2012)
  - Total: 4,433
- Time zone: UTC-4
- Climate: Af

Timehri is a village in Guyana, located 41 kilometers to the south of the nation's capital Georgetown. The name "Timehri" is an Amerindian word meaning "paintings and drawings on the rock"

Timehri contains the Cheddi Jagan International Airport which is the major international airport of the country. The airport used to be called Timehri International Airport.

It is also home to the South Dakota Circuit where numerous international competitors meet and participate in motor racing events each year. The track is located on a former part of the airport.
