= Tobago Express =

Regional airline of Trinidad and Tobago (2001–2007)

IATA	ICAO	Call sign
BW	TBX	TABEX
- Founded: 2001
- Commenced operations: 24 June 2001
- Ceased operations: 30 September 2007 (merged into Caribbean Airlines)
- Hubs: A.N.R. Robinson International Airport
- Secondary hubs: Piarco International Airport
- Frequent-flyer program: BWEE Miles (2001–2006); Caribbean Miles (2006–2007)
- Fleet size: 5
- Destinations: 2
- Parent company: BWIA West Indies Airways (2001–2006); Caribbean Airlines (2006–2007)
- Headquarters: Piarco, Trinidad and Tobago

Tobago Express was a scheduled passenger airline based in Trinidad and Tobago. It operated as a sister airline of BWIA West Indies Airways and operated between the Arthur Napoleon Raymond Robinson International Airport (formerly Crown Point Airport) located in Tobago and Piarco International Airport located in Trinidad.

== History ==
Tobago Express was established in 2001. It was owned by BWIA West Indies Airways, now Caribbean Airlines (45%) and private investors (55%). As of October 1, 2007, Tobago Express was owned (100%) by Caribbean Airlines. In September 2007, Caribbean Airlines acquired all the outstanding shares in Tobago Express and began operational management of the airbridge under its code from 1 October 2007.

== Destinations ==
^{[Hub]}	Base and hub
^{[S]}	Seasonal
^{¤}	Focus city

City	Country	IATA	ICAO	Airport	Refs
Port of Spain	Trinidad and Tobago	POS	TTPP	Piarco International Airport	
Scarborough	Trinidad and Tobago	TAB	TTCP	Arthur Napoleon Raymond Robinson International Airport	

== Fleet ==
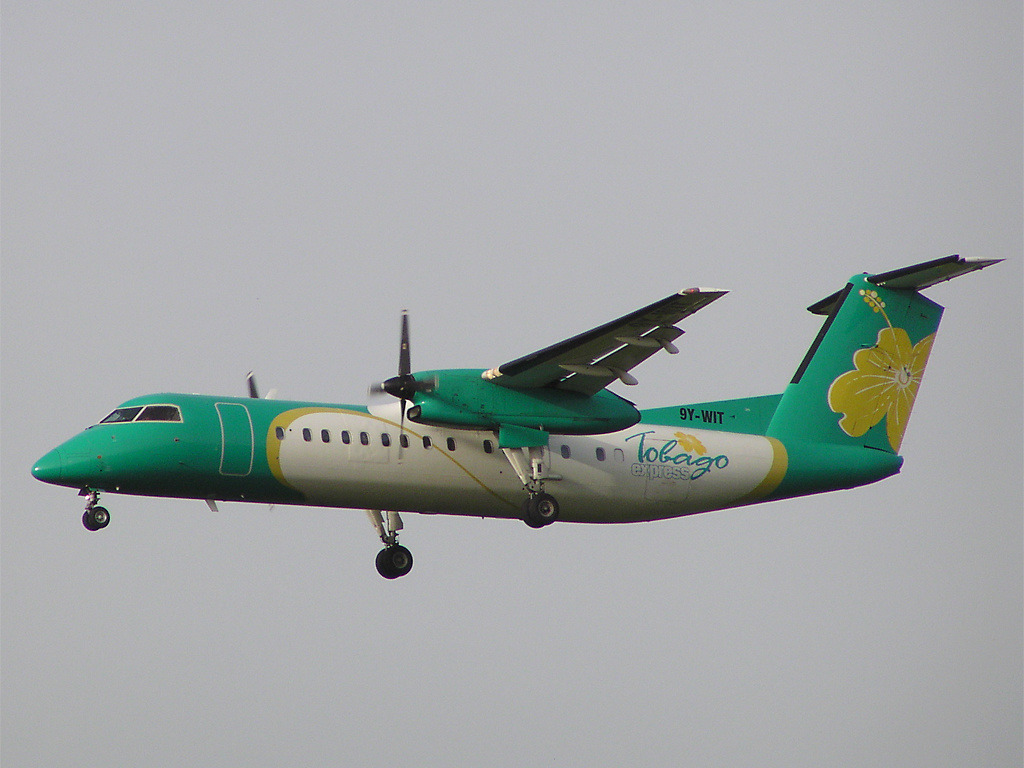
Bombardier DHC-8 (2003)

The Tobago Express fleet included the following aircraft (at September 2007):

Tobago Express fleet
Aircraft	Total	Passengers	Haul
De Havilland Canada Dash 8-300	5	50	Short Haul
