= Cheddi Jagan International Airport =

Airport in Timehri, Guyana

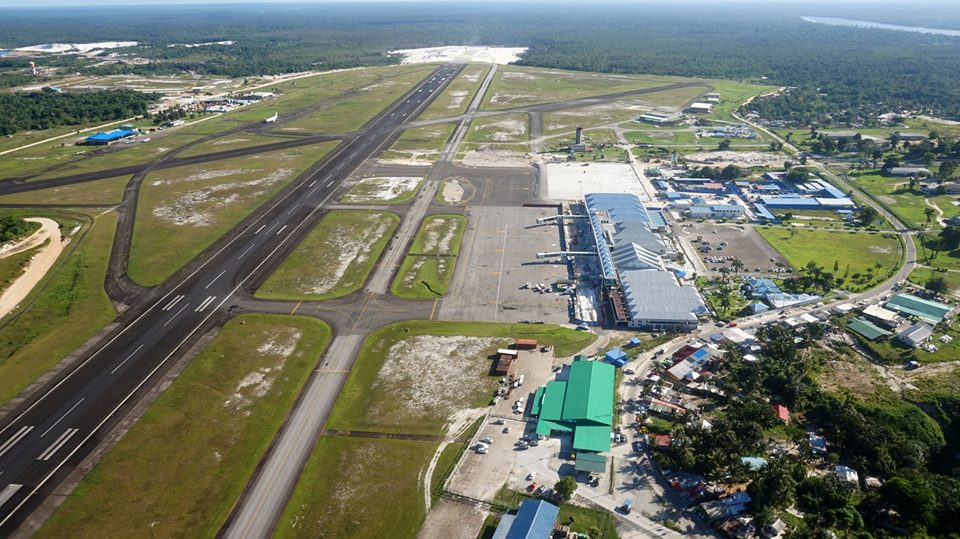
- IATA: GEO; ICAO: SYCJ; WMO: 81002

Summary
- Airport type: Public
- Owner: Government of Guyana
- Operator: Cheddi Jagan International Airport (CJIA) Corporation
- Serves: Georgetown, Guyana
- Location: Timehri
- Elevation AMSL: 95 ft (29 m)
- Coordinates: 06°29′54″N 58°15′14″W
- Website: www.cjairport-gy.com

Map
- Location in Guyana

Runways
Direction	Length		Surface
Direction	ft	m	Surface
06/24	11,023	3,360	Asphalt
11/29	5,003	1,525	Asphalt

Statistics (2024)
- Passengers: 856,830
- Passenger change: ▲17%
- Source: DAFIF

Cheddi Jagan International Airport (IATA: GEO, ICAO: SYCJ), formerly Timehri International Airport, is the primary international airport of Guyana. The airport is located on the right bank of the Demerara River in the city of Timehri, 41 kilometres (25 mi) south of Guyana's capital, Georgetown. It is the larger of the two international airports serving Georgetown with the other airport being the Eugene F. Correia International Airport.

== History ==
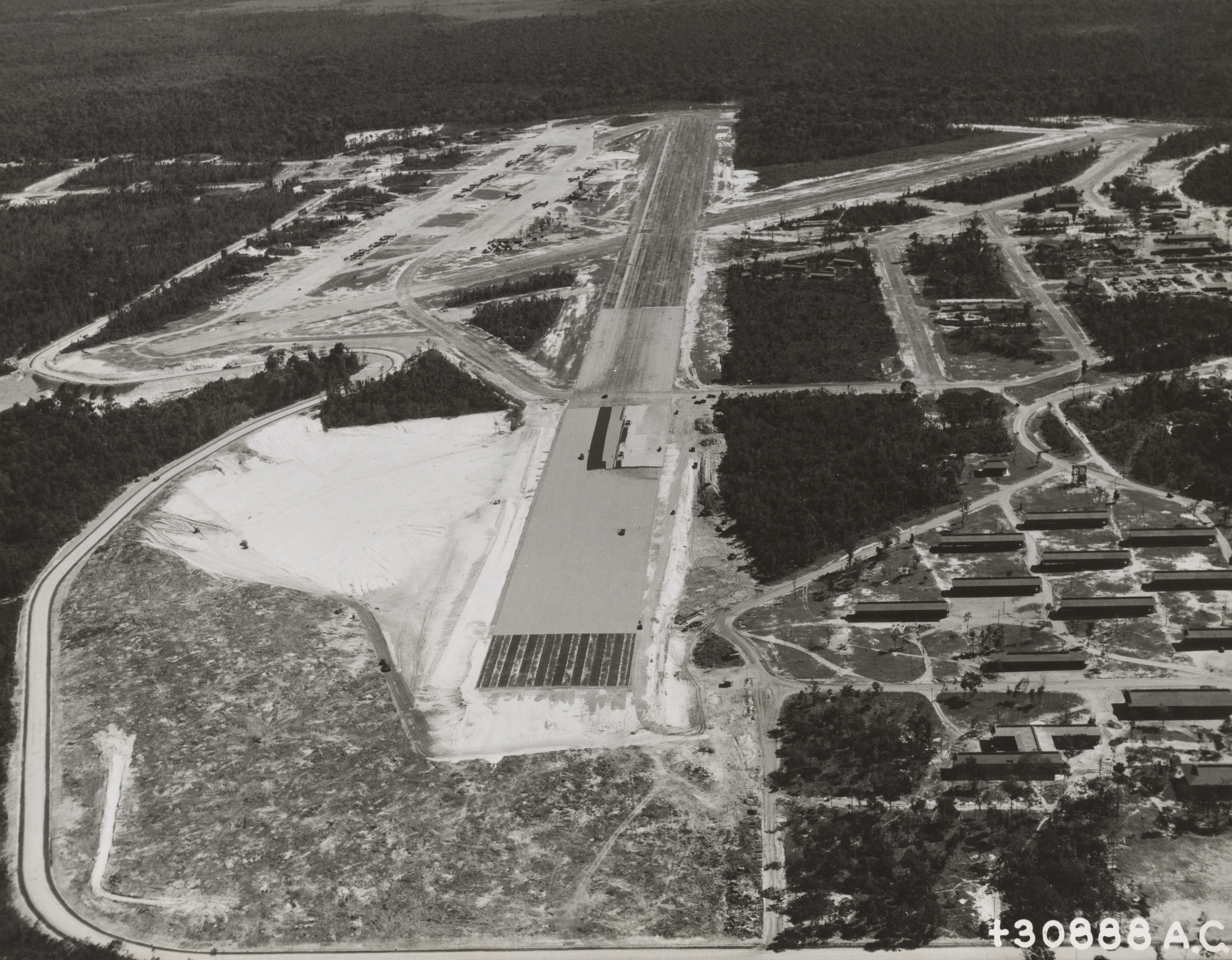
View of Atkinson Field, 1946

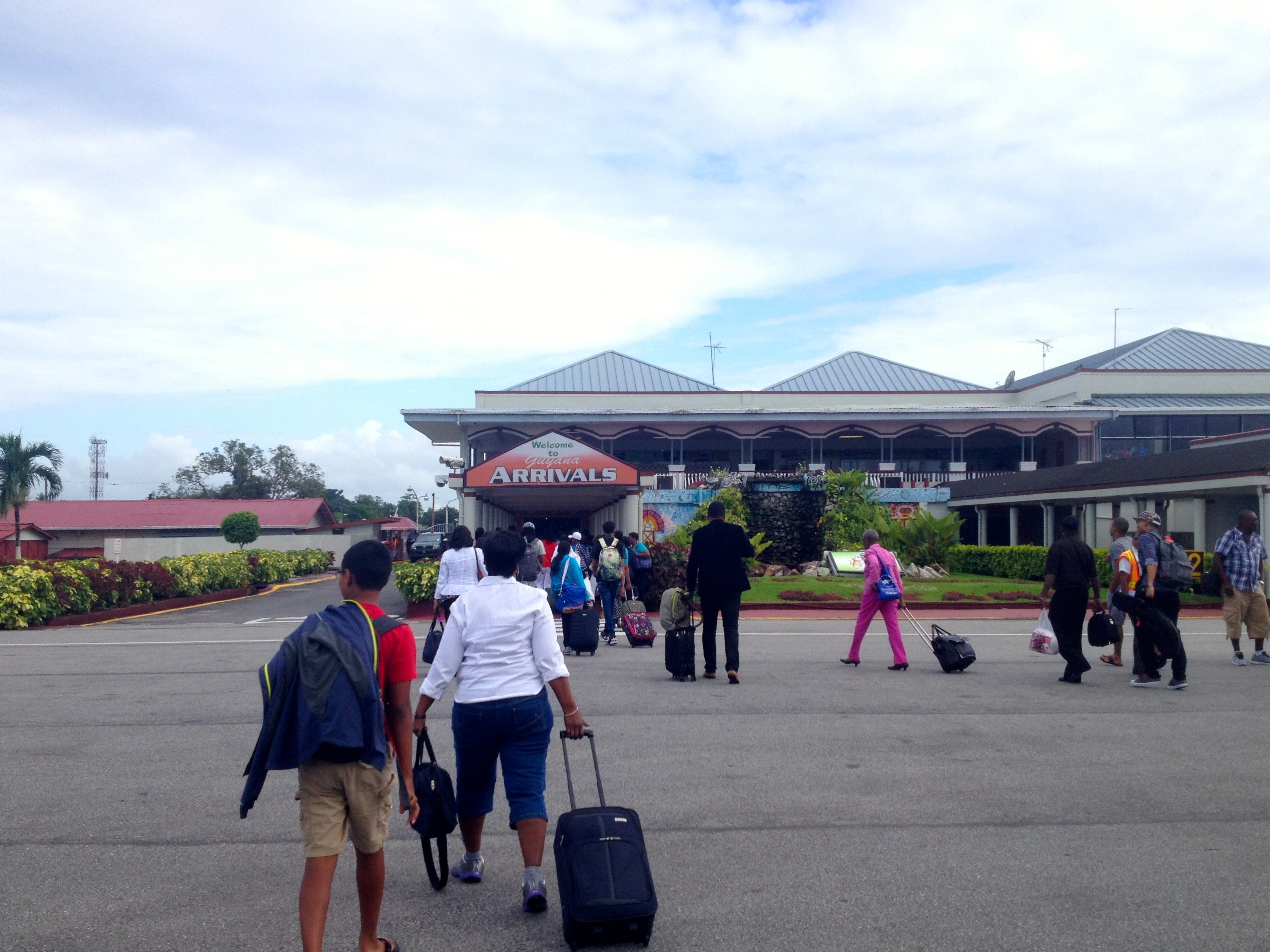
Passengers arrive at Cheddi Jagan International Airport, July 2014

Atkinson Field was built 28 miles (45 km) from Georgetown on 68 acres (28 ha) of land formerly known as Hyde Park, on the Demerara River. The forest was cleared and hills were levelled and a long concrete runway was constructed. On 20 June 1941, the airfield officially opened with the activation of a weather station. The station was named after Lieutenant Colonel Bert M. Atkinson, a United States Army Air Service World War I aviator. Colonel Atkinson was the commander of the 1st Pursuit Wing on the western front in 1918. Colonel Atkinson retired from the Army in 1922 after a distinguished career and died on 27 April 1937.

The mission of the station was the defense of the colony against German U-boats. The airfield was also a major staging point for American aircraft crossing the Atlantic Ocean heading to the European Theatre on the South Atlantic transport route. Aircraft supplied to the British forces by the United States were flown to Atkinson where they were turned over and ferried to North Africa. With the discovery of bauxite deposits in northeast Brazil in 1943, the mission of the airfield was expanded to protect the coastline of northeast South America and prevent any submarine landings by Axis forces on the continent.

United States Army Air Forces 430th Bombardment Squadron 9th Bombardment Group was assigned to Atkinson field from 4 November 1941 to 31 October 1942 flying anti-submarine sorties in Douglas B-18 bombers. The 430th was replaced by a detachment of the 35th Bombardment Squadron (25th Bombardment Group) from 1 November 1942 to 7 October 1943. After the detection of U-boat activity was taken over by the United States Navy, the 91st Reconnaissance Squadron (344th Reconnaissance Group) was assigned to the airfield during 1944 and 1945 flying the F-10 photo-recon version of the B-25 Mitchell bomber on various mapping missions.

At the end of the war, Atkinson Field was reduced in scope to a skeleton staff. The facility was opened for all air travel, including commercial air flights on 1 October 1946. The same year, British West Indian Airways (BWIA, now Caribbean Airlines) was operating nonstop passenger service to Port of Spain, Trinidad. The military airfield was designated Atkinson Air Force Base on 26 March 1948 by Department of the Air Force General Order Number 10. The base was ordered closed on 31 July 1949 due to budgetary cutbacks. The final military cadre was 3 officers and 25 enlisted men upon closure, and the base was officially turned over to British authorities on 1 August 1949.

The airport had jet service in 1961 when Pan American World Airways (Pan Am) was operating Boeing 707 flights with a weekly round trip routing of Paramaribo - Georgetown - Port of Spain - Barbados - New York City. At this same time, Pan Am was also operating weekly Douglas DC-6 propliner service on a routing of Belém - Cayenne - Paramaribo - Georgetown - Port of Spain - Caracas - Curaçao - Port Au Prince - Miami. Also in 1961, British West Indian Airways (BWIA) was operating all flights from the airport with Vickers Viscount turboprop aircraft with nonstop service to Port of Spain with direct one stop service to Barbados. BWIA then introduced jet service with Boeing 727-100 aircraft during the mid-1960s and by 1966 was operating all of its passenger service into the airport with the 727 on nonstop flights to Port of Spain and also to Paramaribo in addition to all-cargo flights nonstop to Port of Spain and direct to Miami operated with Douglas DC-4 prop aircraft.

The lease of the facility by the United States was formally terminated on 26 May 1966.

In 1965 and 1968 additions were made to the airport facilities. Also in 1968, British West Indian Airways (BWIA) was operating direct, no change of plane Boeing 727-100 jet service to New York City via JFK Airport via intermediate stops in Port of Spain and Barbados. On 1 May 1969, the Atkinson Aerodrome was renamed the Timehri International Airport, after ancient rock motifs in the Guyana hinterland. Murals in the airport, painted by Aubrey Williams, feature the designs. In 1971, BWIA was operating daily nonstop service to Port of Spain from the airport with Boeing 707 jetliners. By 1973, ALM Antillean Airlines was operating Douglas DC-9 jet service on a routing of Paramaribo - Georgetown - Port of Spain - Curaçao - Kingston - Miami three times a week according to the Official Airline Guide (OAG). Air France was serving the airport in 1977 with round trip service flown twice weekly on a Pointe-a-Pitre - Fort-de-France - Port of Spain - Georgetown - Paramaribo - Cayenne routing operated with a Boeing 737-200. Pan American World Airways (Pan Am) was serving the airport in 1980 with daily one stop Boeing 707 jet service to New York JFK Airport via an intermediate stop in Port of Spain. In 1981, Guy-America Airways was operating nonstop Boeing 707 jet service between New York JFK Airport and Guyana three days a week.

In 1983, according to the Official Airline Guide (OAG), four airlines were operating scheduled passenger air service at the airport: ALM Antillean Airlines, Arrow Air, British West Indies Airways (BWIA, formerly British West Indian Airways) and Guyana Airways. At this time, ALM was operating McDonnell Douglas MD-80 jet service nonstop to Port of Spain, Trinidad, with one stop direct MD-80 flights to Curaçao, U.S.-based Arrow Air was flying nonstop Boeing 707 jet service to JFK Airport in New York City, BWIA was operating nonstop McDonnell Douglas DC-9-50 jet flights to Port of Spain and locally based Guyana Airways was flying Boeing 707 nonstop service to Barbados, Miami, New York JFK Airport, Paramaribo, Suriname and Port of Spain. The OAG also lists local and regional flights operated by Guyana Airways with Hawker Siddeley 748 and de Havilland Canada DHC-6 Twin Otter turboprop aircraft at this time. Guyana Airways had earlier operated Boeing 737-200 jet service from the airport in 1981 with nonstop flights to Barbados, Miami, Paramaribo and Port of Spain. By 1989, two airlines were operating nonstop flights between the airport and New York JFK: Guyana Airways with three Boeing 707 flights a week and Tropical Airways flying stretched Super Douglas DC-8 jets twice a week. In 1993, Guyana Airways was operating nonstop Boeing 757-200 flights from GEO to New York JFK Airport three days a week while BWIA and Leisure Air were operating direct one stop flights from New York JFK Airport, BWIA with McDonnell Douglas MD-80 jets five days a week via an intermediate stop in Antigua and Leisure Air with Airbus A320 jets once a week via an intermediate stop in St. Lucia. In 1995 Barbados-based Carib Express was operating British Aerospace BAe 146-100 jet service to destinations in the Caribbean.

In 1997, the airport was named after President Cheddi Jagan, following his death in March of that year.

The Cheddi Jagan International Airport underwent a 150 million dollar modernization and expansion. The runway was extended to about 10,500 feet and the expansion provided a new arrivals terminal building with eight boarding bridges, elevators and CCTV. This was completed in December 2018. However, the check-in facility opened at the same time. In March 2023, British Airways commenced service to London's Gatwick Airport via Saint Lucia.

== Facilities ==
The airport sits at an elevation of 95 feet (29 m) above mean sea level. It has two asphalt paved runways: 06/24 measuring 11,025 by 148 feet (3,360 m × 45 m) and 11/29 measuring 5,002 by 148 feet (1,525 m × 45 m). The terminal has six ground level gates and four boarding bridges.

== Airlines and destinations ==
=== Passenger ===
Airlines	Destinations
Air Transat	Seasonal: Toronto–Pearson
American Airlines	Miami, New York-JFK
Avianca	Bogotá
British Airways	Barbados, London–Gatwick, St. Lucia–Hewanorra
Caribbean Airlines	New York–JFK, Port of Spain, Toronto–Pearson
Copa Airlines	Panama City–Tocumen
Fly All Ways	Havana, Paramaribo
InterCaribbean Airways	Barbados
JetBlue	New York–JFK
KLM	Amsterdam, St. Maarten; Seasonal: Barbados
Liat20	Antigua
Sky High	Havana, Santo Domingo–Las Américas
Surinam Airways	Barbados, Miami, Paramaribo
United Airlines	Houston–Intercontinental

== Accidents and incidents ==
- On 30 July 2011, Caribbean Airlines Flight 523 overran a runway in rainy weather while landing at Cheddi Jagan International Airport and went through a chain-link perimeter fence. The aircraft, a Boeing 737-800, broke in two just behind the first class cabin. There were no fatalities, although at least two passengers suffered broken legs and many others suffered lacerations and other injuries. Caribbean Airlines confirmed that 163 people (157 passengers and 6 crew members) were on board the aircraft at the time.
- On 9 November 2018, Fly Jamaica Airways Flight 256, bound for Toronto, overshot the runway when making an emergency landing for technical issues in the Boeing 757's hydraulics. This caused significant damage to the aircraft and one passenger fatality. The airliner involved, B757-200 registration N524AT was deemed beyond economical repair and written-off.
