= Ola Svanberg =

Swedish ice hockey player

- Born: June 10, 1985 (age 41) Tranemo, Sweden
- Height: 6 ft 0 in (183 cm)
- Weight: 198 lb (90 kg; 14 st 2 lb)
- Position: Defence
- Shot: Left
- Played for: HV71 (SEL); Rögle BK; IK Oskarshamn; Brynäs IF (SEL); VIK Västerås HK
- Playing career: 2001–2017

Ola Svanberg (born June 10, 1985, in Tranemo) is a Swedish former ice hockey player. He played with the VIK Västerås HK after having transferred from Brynäs IF in the Elitserien on 30 January 2009. He won the Swedish Hockey League, which then was known as Elitserien, in the 2003–04 season with the Jönköping ice hockey club HV71.

== Career statistics ==
			Regular season					Playoffs
Season	Team	League	GP	G	A	Pts	PIM	GP	G	A	Pts	PIM
2001–02	HV71 J20	J20 SuperElit	35	5	4	9	57	—	—	—	—	—
2001–02	HV71	Elitserien	2	0	0	0	0	—	—	—	—	—
2002–03	HV71 J18	J18 Allsvenskan	7	4	3	7	22	1	0	0	0	2
2002–03	HV71 J20	J20 SuperElit	26	3	5	8	54	7	0	1	1	31
2002–03	HV71	Elitserien	5	0	0	0	0	—	—	—	—	—
2003–04	HV71 J20	J20 SuperElit	31	4	19	23	79	—	—	—	—	—
2003–04	HV71	Elitserien	24	0	0	0	2	19	0	0	0	0
2004–05	HV71 J20	J20 SuperElit	8	3	3	6	16	—	—	—	—	—
2004–05	HV71	Elitserien	43	1	4	5	18	—	—	—	—	—
2005–06	HV71 J20	J20 SuperElit	3	1	3	4	10	—	—	—	—	—
2005–06	HV71	Elitserien	50	0	8	8	30	12	1	2	3	16
2006–07	HV71 J20	J20 SuperElit	2	0	4	4	4	—	—	—	—	—
2006–07	HV71	Elitserien	27	0	1	1	6	9	0	0	0	0
2006–07	Rögle BK	HockeyAllsvenskan	22	2	3	5	24	—	—	—	—	—
2007–08	IK Oskarshamn	HockeyAllsvenskan	45	10	17	27	84	—	—	—	—	—
2008–09	Brynäs IF J20	J20 SuperElit	1	0	3	3	2	—	—	—	—	—
2008–09	Brynäs IF	Elitserien	43	0	2	2	18	—	—	—	—	—
2008–09	VIK Västerås HK	HockeyAllsvenskan	7	1	3	4	2	9	0	1	1	27
2009–10	VIK Västerås HK	HockeyAllsvenskan	23	0	9	9	24	—	—	—	—	—
2009–10	HC Vita Hästen	Division 1	6	1	4	5	0	5	1	2	3	0
2010–11	Borås HC	HockeyAllsvenskan	43	7	18	25	42	—	—	—	—	—
2011–12	Borås HC	HockeyAllsvenskan	51	2	5	7	40	—	—	—	—	—
2012–13	HC Vita Hästen	Hockeyettan	39	3	20	23	28	12	0	9	9	8
2013–14	HC Vita Hästen	Hockeyettan	15	1	9	10	10	—	—	—	—	—
2013–14	IK Guts	Division 3	2	0	2	2	20	—	—	—	—	—
2013–14	Västerviks IK	Hockeyettan	15	2	8	10	12	3	0	1	1	16
2014–15	IK Guts	Division 3	20	8	14	22	36	—	—	—	—	—
2015–16	Valdemarsviks IF	Division 3	14	3	9	12	41	6	1	4	5	8
2016–17	IK Guts	Division 3	7	2	1	3	10	—	—	—	—	—
Elitserien totals			194	1	15	16	74	40	1	2	3	16
HockeyAllsvenskan totals			191	22	55	77	216	9	0	1	1	27
Hockeyettan/Division 1 totals			75	7	41	48	50	20	1	12	13	24
