= Fly Jamaica Airways Flight 256 =

2018 aviation accident in Guyana

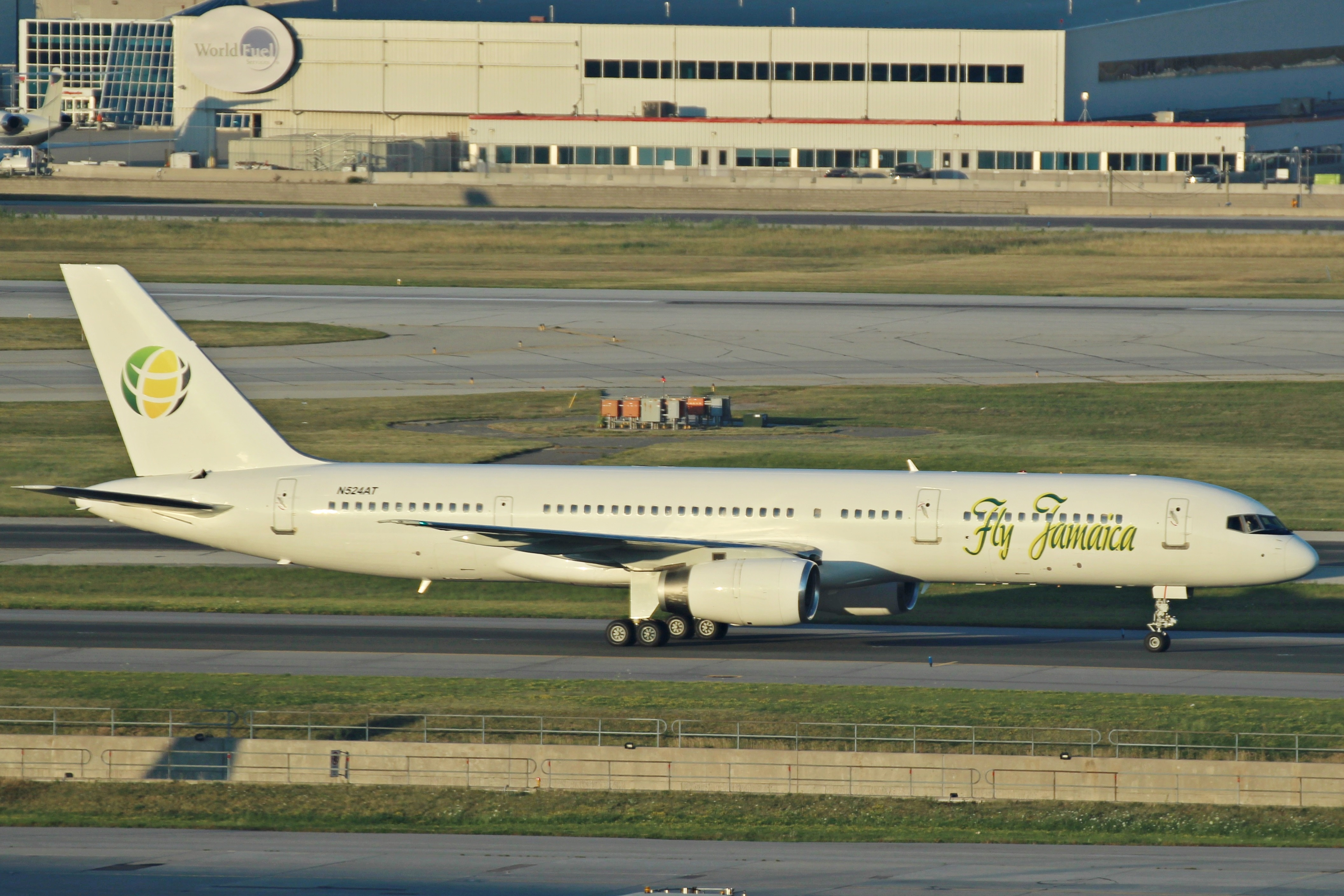
- N524AT, the aircraft involved in the accident, photographed in July 2018

Accident
- Date: 9 November 2018
- Summary: Runway excursion caused by a hydraulics failure due to poor maintenance and quality control
- Site: Cheddi Jagan International Airport; 6°30′25.1″N 58°14′44.7″W

Aircraft
- Aircraft type: Boeing 757-23N
- Operator: Fly Jamaica Airways
- IATA flight No.: OJ256
- ICAO flight No.: FJA256
- Call sign: Greenheart 256
- Registration: N524AT
- Flight origin: Cheddi Jagan International Airport, Guyana
- Destination: Toronto Pearson International Airport, Ontario, Canada
- Occupants: 128
- Passengers: 120
- Crew: 8
- Fatalities: 1
- Injuries: 10
- Survivors: 127

Fly Jamaica Airways Flight 256 was a scheduled international passenger flight from Cheddi Jagan International Airport in Guyana to Toronto Pearson International Airport in Canada. On 9 November 2018, the Boeing 757 aircraft serving the flight suffered a hydraulic failure, forcing its return and resulting in a runway excursion on landing. This caused significant damage to the aircraft and one passenger fatality.

== Aircraft ==
The aircraft involved was a Boeing 757-23N, MSN 30233, registered as N524AT, that was built by Boeing Commercial Airplanes in 1999. It first flew on 7 October 1999 and had logged 43420 hours and 13 minutes of airframe hours and 13367 takeoff and landing cycles. It was also powered by two Rolls-Royce RB211-535E4 engines.

== Accident ==
The aircraft departed from Cheddi Jagan International Airport in Guyana on 9 November 2018 at 02:10 AM local time, bound for Toronto, Canada. The flight subsequently reported a fault with the hydraulic system; as a result, the pilot aborted the climb and the plane returned to the departure airport for an emergency landing, touching down at 02:53. During the landing, the aircraft overran the runway and hit the airport perimeter fence, sustaining substantial damage in the process to the right-hand main landing gear and the No. 2 engine.

== Passengers and crew ==
Country	No.
Passengers
Canada	82
Guyana	35
United States	1
Pakistan	1
Trinidad	1
Crew
Guyana	6
Jamaica	2

There were 120 passengers and 8 crew members on board the aircraft. 11 people on the aircraft suffered injuries in the crash. One of the injured, an 86-year-old female passenger, died of her injuries five days later.

The pilot in command was 58-year-old Captain Basil Ferguson, he joined Fly Jamaica Airways in 2018, and had a total of 11,755 flight hours. The second in command was 33-year-old First Officer Keone Bryan, he joined the airline in 2017, and had a total of 4,331 flight hours, including 317 hours on the Boeing 757.

== Investigation ==
The accident was investigated by the Guyana Civil Aviation Authority (GCAA) with assistance from the Canadian Transportation Safety Board (TSB) and the United States National Transportation Safety Board (NTSB).

The GCAA concluded in its final report that the major cause of the accident was the “loss of hydraulic fluid, failure of the pressure switch and subsequent total failure of the hydraulic system (firstly the left and subsequently the right) which affected the deployment of some spoilers, thrust reversers and efficacy of the main brakes caused the aircraft to continue the landing roll at a high-speed resulting in an overrun and excursion and severe damage to the aircraft.”

== Aftermath ==
After the accident Fly Jamaica Airways ceased its operation on March 31, 2019, aggravated by financial difficulties and lack of aircraft.

== See also ==
- Flight with disabled controls
- United Airlines Flight 232
- Turkish Airlines Flight 981
- Japan Airlines Flight 123
- Eastern Air Lines Flight 935
- 2003 Baghdad DHL attempted shootdown incident
- List of accidents and incidents involving commercial aircraft
