= Caribbean Airlines =

Flag carrier of Trinidad and Tobago and Jamaica

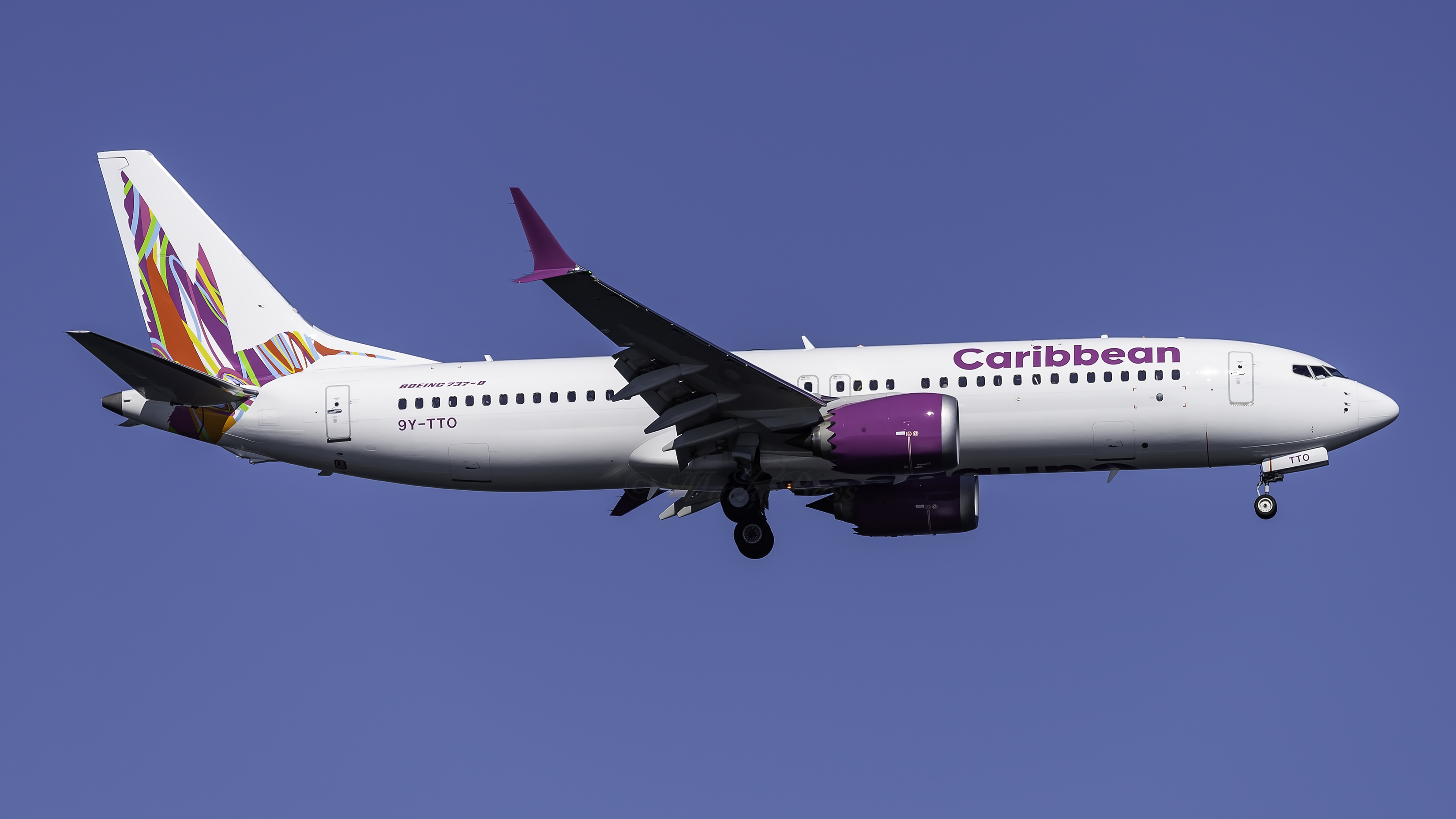
- Caribbean Airlines Boeing 737 MAX 8 in current livery
IATA	ICAO	Call sign
BW	BWA	CARIBBEAN AIRLINES
- Founded: 27 November 1939 (as BWIA); 19 September 2006 (as Caribbean Airlines)
- Commenced operations: 1 January 2007
- Hubs: Kingston–Norman Manley; Port of Spain
- Frequent-flyer program: Caribbean Miles
- Fleet size: 20
- Destinations: 28
- Parent company: Government of Jamaica (11.9%); Government of Trinidad and Tobago (88.1%)
- Headquarters: Piarco, Trinidad and Tobago
- Key people: Nirmala Ramai (CEO) (acting) & (COO)
- Net income: ▲US$ 24 million
- Employees: 1,600
- Website: www.caribbean-airlines.com

Caribbean Airlines Limited is the state-owned airline and flag carrier of Trinidad and Tobago and Jamaica. Headquartered in Iere House in Piarco, the airline operates flights to the Caribbean, North America and South America from its base at Piarco International Airport, Trinidad. Presently Caribbean Airlines employs more than 1,600 people and is the largest airline in the Caribbean. The company slogan is The Warmth of the Islands.

The current Chief Executive Officer (acting) is Nirmala Ramai, the current chief operating officer. She was appointed after the resignation of Garvin Medera, who had been CEO for the past eight years. The current board of directors are Reyna Kowlessar as chairman with Videsh Praim as vice-chairman, and Darren Ali, Lauren Perth, and Selwyn Cudjoe as directors.

== History ==
=== Early years ===
Caribbean Airlines was incorporated in the Republic of Trinidad and Tobago on 27 September 2006.

In September 2006, following the recommendation of Peter Davies, the CEO of BWIA West Indies Airways, Caribbean Airlines got approval from the Trinidad and Tobago government to begin operations, after the failed negotiations between the unions and the management of its predecessor, BWIA. As a result, it was announced on 8 September 2006, that BWIA was to be shut down before the launch of Caribbean Airlines. During the last quarter of 2006, in an effort to scale down operations for the start of Caribbean Airlines, BWIA's management cut routes such as Manchester Airport, London Heathrow Airport, New York City and Toronto, with intermediate stops at Barbados or Antigua, ceased services to and from Saint Lucia, cut its fleet to six Boeing 737-800 jet aircraft retrofitted with wingtip devices (winglets) and reduced its staff to 800, with a majority of the staff former BWIA workers now contracted.

The new airline's capital included funds to close and settle BWIA's operations. The company commenced operations on 1 January 2007, servicing the remaining routes of BWIA.

Caribbean Airlines began operations with a fleet of six Boeing 737-800 aircraft and one Airbus A340-313 with the latter aircraft type operating the London Heathrow route until May 2007. The airline offered two classes of service, first/business class and economy class on both the Boeing and Airbus aircraft. Caribbean Airlines operated daily direct services to Miami, Toronto, New York, Jamaica (with stops in Barbados and Antigua/St. Maarten), Guyana, Suriname and London Heathrow till May 2007 due to the ICC 2007 Cricket World Cup, all out of its hub at Piarco International Airport. Peter Davies resigned from his position as CEO, effective 30 September 2007, but remained as a strategic advisor to Caribbean Airlines. In the first half of 2007, two Airbus A340-200 planes and a Boeing 737-800, 9Y-GND, were returned to International Lease Finance Corporation (ILFC) and GE Commercial Aviation Services (GECAS), respectively.

On 1 October 2007, Philip Saunders, Star Alliance VP Commercial, was appointed the new chief executive officer of Caribbean Airlines. Subsequently, the airline took over operations of Tobago Express, its domestic arm at a cost of US$24 million with the intentions to upgrade the fleet of Bombardier Dash-8 Q300 to international standards and also adding new Caribbean destinations to be served via this regional airline subsidiary.

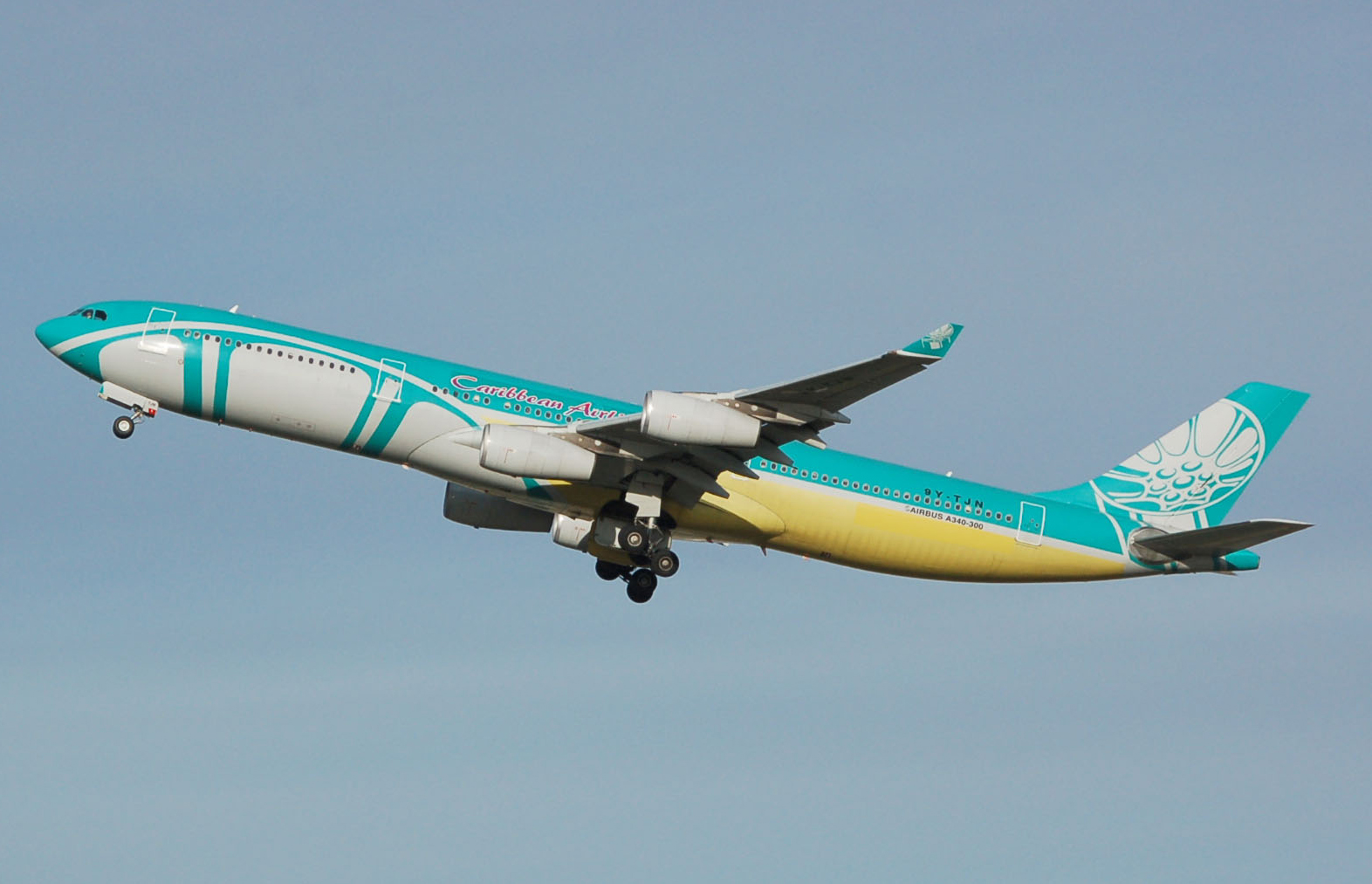
A former Caribbean Airlines Airbus A340-300 still in BWIA West Indies Airways livery

In March 2008, the airline added a daily direct service to the Simón Bolívar International Airport in Caracas, using the Dash 8 aircraft. In May 2008, Caribbean Airlines acquired a seventh Boeing 737-800 aircraft. The airline added a new U.S. route on 22 May to Fort Lauderdale-Hollywood International Airport from Piarco International Airport. This route began operations on a four times per week schedule and later in July of the same year, the frequency was increased to daily service.

On 15 November 2008, Transavia agreed to operate a wet-lease operation on behalf of Caribbean Airlines, it increased its fleet to eight Boeing 737-800. The aircraft was re-fitted to the standard 16/138 configuration including an extra nine inches of seat pitch in the business class cabin, due to a different galley and closet placement. This allowed the airline to increase flight frequency to meet demand for the peak travel periods. The lease was contracted to be in effect until 15 April 2009. The aircraft was returned in June 2009, and Sun Country Airlines, a U.S. air carrier, then leased a Boeing 737-800 to Caribbean Airlines.

In April 2009, the airline increased its frequency of service to Simón Bolívar International Airport in Caracas from a daily service to ten flights per week. The route was operated by the Bombardier Dash-8 Q300, configured for 50 passengers in an all economy service. Daily flights to its gateways Fort Lauderdale and Miami continued. Services to Toronto and New York City remained at twice daily and 20 weekly (up to 28 weekly in peak season), respectively.

On 27 July 2009, Philip Saunders announced his resignation as CEO of Caribbean Airlines, for personal reasons. Caribbean Airlines appointed Captain Ian Brunton in October 2009 as CEO of the airline. Also in 2009, Caribbean Airlines operated services from the southern Caribbean to Jamaica, as well as South America, including Suriname, Guyana and Venezuela. The airline also continued to serve the United States and Canada, in Miami, Fort Lauderdale, New York City and Toronto, having also established a codeshare agreement with British Airways, for services to London and beyond. As of 2009, the airline operated a fleet of eight Boeing 737-800 aircraft and five Bombardier Dash-8 Q300 aircraft, out of its main hub at Piarco International Airport, Trinidad. The Dash 8 aircraft have since been replaced with new ATR 72-600, a larger turboprop aircraft.

=== Acquisition of Air Jamaica ===
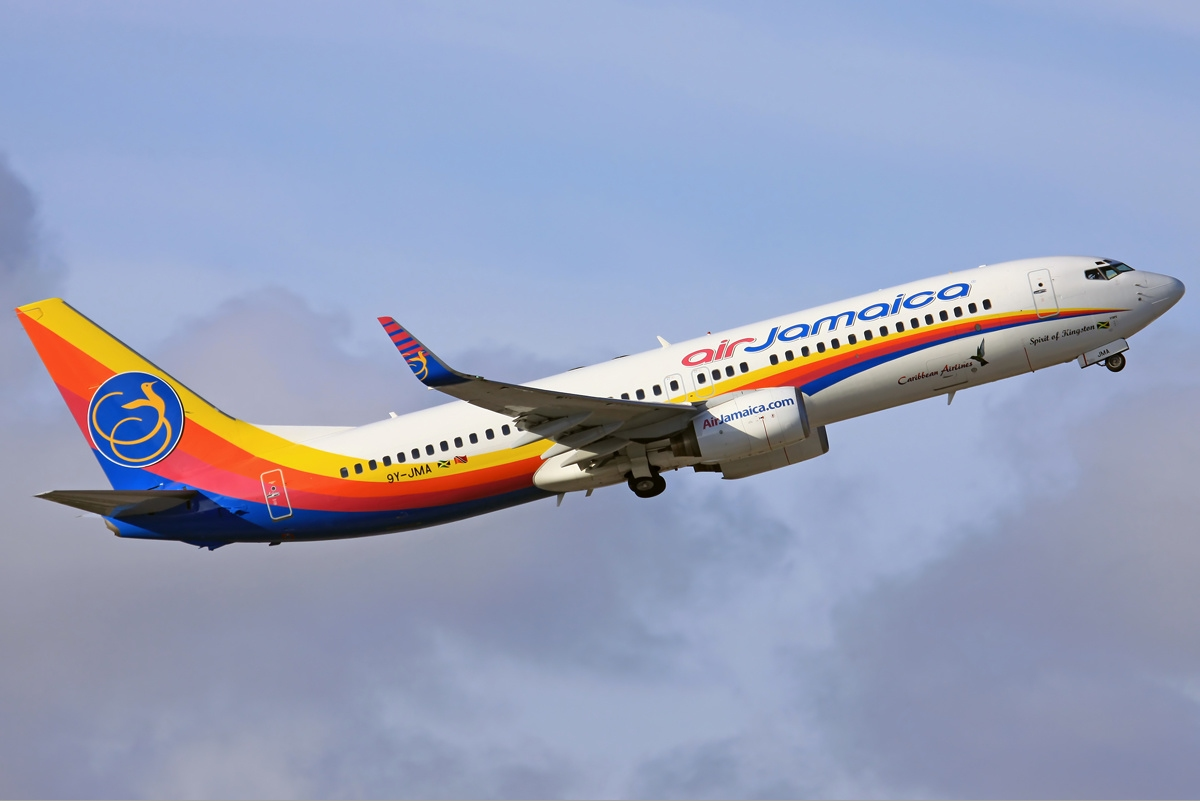
A former Air Jamaica Boeing 737-800 operated by Caribbean Airlines

Caribbean Airlines Limited, through the government of Trinidad and Tobago, announced plans to operate a base in Jamaica following the divestment of Air Jamaica which was slated to occur between 30 April 2010 to that same period in 2011. Caribbean Airlines provided a seamless transition following Air Jamaica's closure. When the deal was finalized, Caribbean Airlines Limited became the largest airline in the Caribbean with a new hub in Kingston Jamaica's Norman Manley International Airport. The divestment was scheduled to become effective on 30 April 2010 after it was rescheduled from 12 April 2010. On this day, it was planned that Air Jamaica would cease operations and Caribbean Airlines will then acquire the airline's most profitable routes and their remaining six aircraft. Plans were also announced to replace the aircraft fleet with all Boeing 737-800 Next Generation jets.

On 4 March 2010, Caribbean Airlines announced they would terminate their codeshare agreement with British Airways for the Port of Spain-London Gatwick route effective 27 March 2010 thus paving the way for a nonstop service to be operated by Caribbean between Piarco International Airport and London, UK.

On 28 April 2010, Caribbean Airlines Limited and Air Jamaica signed a final agreement for the purchase of Air Jamaica by Caribbean Airlines Limited, following the signing of a letter of intent to merge in January of the same year. The agreement stated that Caribbean would continue operating Air Jamaica's routes and also retain 900 of Air Jamaica's employees. Financing was provided by the government of Trinidad and Tobago, which contributed around $50 million to complete the merger, and Jamaica, which assumed more than $800 million in costs related to the closure of Air Jamaica.

In August 2010, Caribbean Airlines and Air India signed a travel pact for Trinidadians travelling to India. In October, the airline announced a fleet renewal consisting of fifteen (15) Boeing 737-800 Next Generation jets and nine ATR 72-600 turboprop aircraft. The new Boeing jets were intended to replace Air Jamaica's operating fleet of Airbus aircraft.

On 27 May 2011, the acquisition of Air Jamaica was completed, with Finance Minister Winston Dookeran and Jamaican Finance Minister Audley Shaw at the Prime Minister' St. Clair office, signing the shareholding agreement. This agreement allows the Jamaican government to own a 16% stake of Caribbean Airlines Limited. On 28 October 2011, the U.S. Department of Transportation fined Caribbean Airlines $60,000 for limiting reimbursements for lost, damaged and delayed baggage to less than consumers were entitled under the Montreal Convention.

According to chairman of the board of Caribbean Airlines George Nicholas III, Caribbean Airlines is pursuing a relationship with Star Alliance, the world's largest airline alliance, in an effort to support Jamaican hoteliers. It is also reported they are preparing to start a route to Mumbai, but no date has been given. Also, Nicholas announced that Johannesburg, Nigeria, and Brazil are possible contenders for new routes. Chicago and Atlanta are the two new U.S. gateways that are being considered, Nicholas stated.

On 29 March 2013, the U.S. Department of Transportation (DOT) fined the airline $100,000 for not providing passengers with an opportunity to leave a plane that was delayed on the tarmac at New York's JFK Airport for more than four hours.

In early 2016, the management of Caribbean Airlines has set as an agenda to consider replacing its ATR fleet with comparable turboprops sourced from Bombardier due to persistent reliability problems. The former chief executive officer (CEO) Michael Di Lollo described the ATRs as "not mission capable" after they suffered from frequent AOG (Aircraft On Ground) occurrences. On his recommendation, efforts were made to sourcing Dash 8-400 aircraft to replace the carrier's fleet of five ATR72-600s.

Also in early 2016, the airline returned its two Boeing 767-300ER aircraft to their lessor, coinciding with termination of its only European route to London Gatwick Airport on 10 January 2016, as part of a streamlining exercise to remove unprofitable routes.

In 2018, the airline posted an order for 737 MAX-8 aircraft, to replace the aging fleet of 737-800 aircraft. The order was initially placed in 2018, and put on hold after the grounding of the 737 MAX family.

Also in 2018, the services Caribbean Cafe and Caribbean Plus were launched for the first time. Caribbean Plus served as an upgraded economy class with larger seats and extra legroom, but with the same service. Caribbean Cafe offered buy-on-board local snacks, drinks and amenities.

In 2019, the airline posted its first profit of four million ($4,000,000 U.S.) dollars.

=== Rebranding and revitalization ===
In 2020, the airline began a rebranding exercise, introducing a new logo and livery. The first aircraft to receive the new livery, was an ATR 72-600, 9Y-TTI. The new logo retains the iconic hummingbird while infusing fluid lines and brighter hues to embody the spirit of flight, the vibrancy of Caribbean culture and connectivity within the region. The rest of the existing ATR fleet was repainted gradually, with the last aircraft being repainted in 2024.

In late 2021, the airline began receiving the first of 12 737 MAX-8 aircraft, ordered previously in 2018. The delivery came a year after the 737 MAX was cleared for service by the FAA. Over the course of the next few months, the airline received 9 of these aircraft, ultimately phasing out the 737-800 entirely by 2023.

The new aircraft were painted in the rebranded livery, with a vastly modernized cabin. The cabin configuration was very similar to that of the 737-800, albeit with slightly more seats. Caribbean View, a stream-to-your-device onboard entertainment system was implemented previously, but was improved on the new aircraft including personal touchscreens for Business Class Passengers.

In 2023, the airline announced that flights to Caracas, Venezuela would be restarted on a weekly basis, with frequency expected to increase. Coming out of the COVID-19 pandemic, Caribbean Airlines began flights to Dominica, restarted flights to Ft. Lauderdale and Caracas, introduced a temporary route from Georgetown, Guyana to Houston and stated their plans for fleet expansion and additional destinations in the Caribbean.

In July 2023, it was announced that new flights to Tortola, British Virgin Islands and San Juan, Puerto Rico were tentatively approved. An Eastern Caribbean route expansion, including flights to Basseterre, St. Kitts & Nevis, was also announced with new flights from Barbados, St. Lucia-Castries, St. Vincent-Argyle, Dominica-Douglas Charles and Antigua. This route expansion coincided with the airline's order for additional ATR 72-600 aircraft.

In July 2024, the airline began nonstop service between Port of Spain and San Juan, Puerto Rico. Flights to Tortola, British Virgin Islands were announced for October 2024 operating on a milk-run service between Trinidad, Antigua/Barbados, Tortola and San Juan. In October 2024, flights to both Martinique and Guadeloupe were announced for December 2024, and the airline was given further clearance from the government to acquire additional aircraft for expansions into North and South America.

As of October 2024, the TSA PreCheck program announced that Caribbean Airlines has been added to the list of new participating airlines.

In May 2026, the airline terminated flights to Dominica and St. Kitts and Nevis citing a loss of US$2.38 million collectively. The non-stop Guyana and Suriname service was also discountinued which incurred an overall loss of US$1.24 million. Service to Martinique and Guadeloupe were reduced from four weekly flights to two, both routes had incurred an overall loss in excess of US$1 million.

== Corporate affairs ==
=== Branding ===
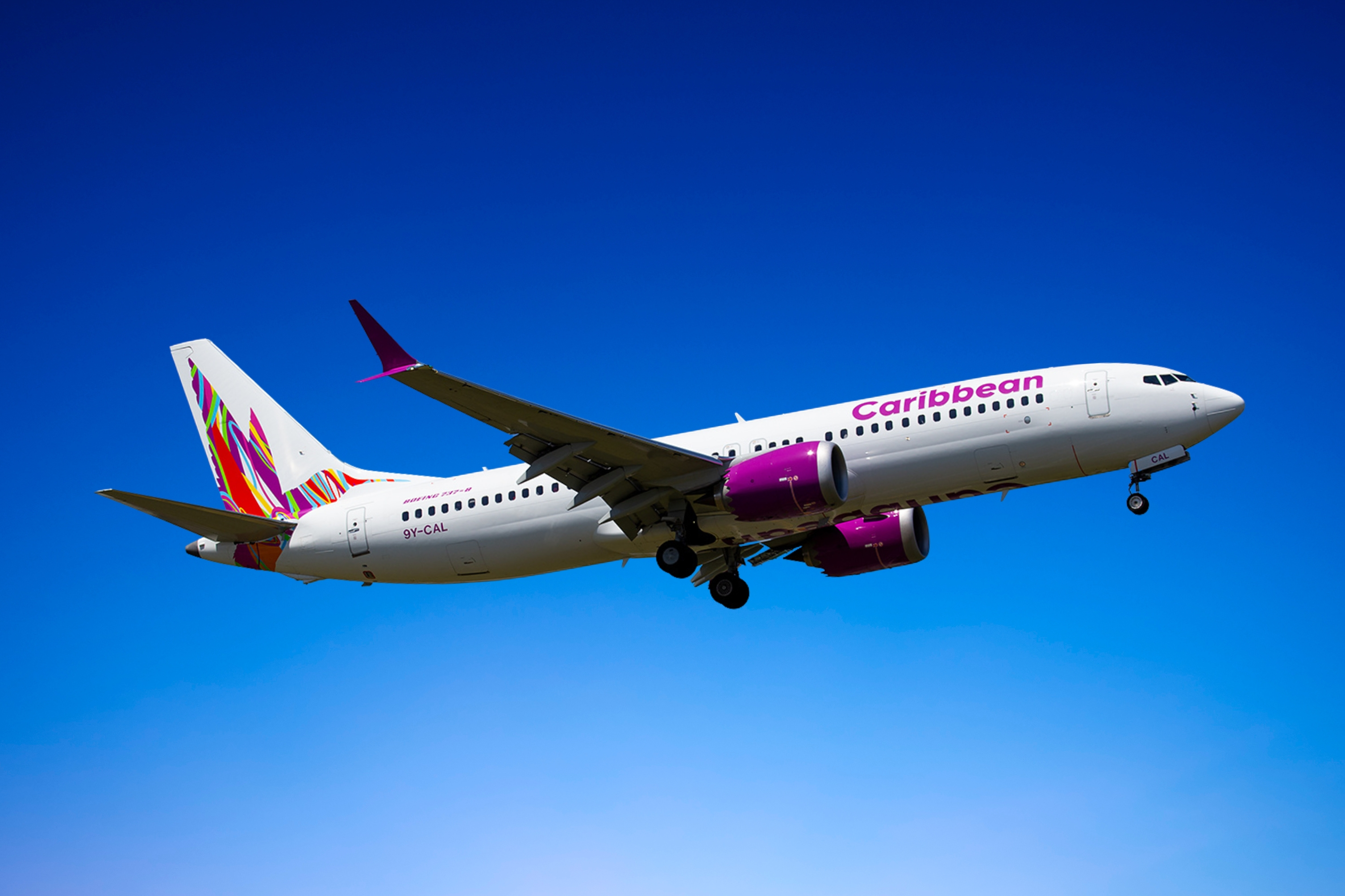
Caribbean Airlines Boeing 737 MAX 8

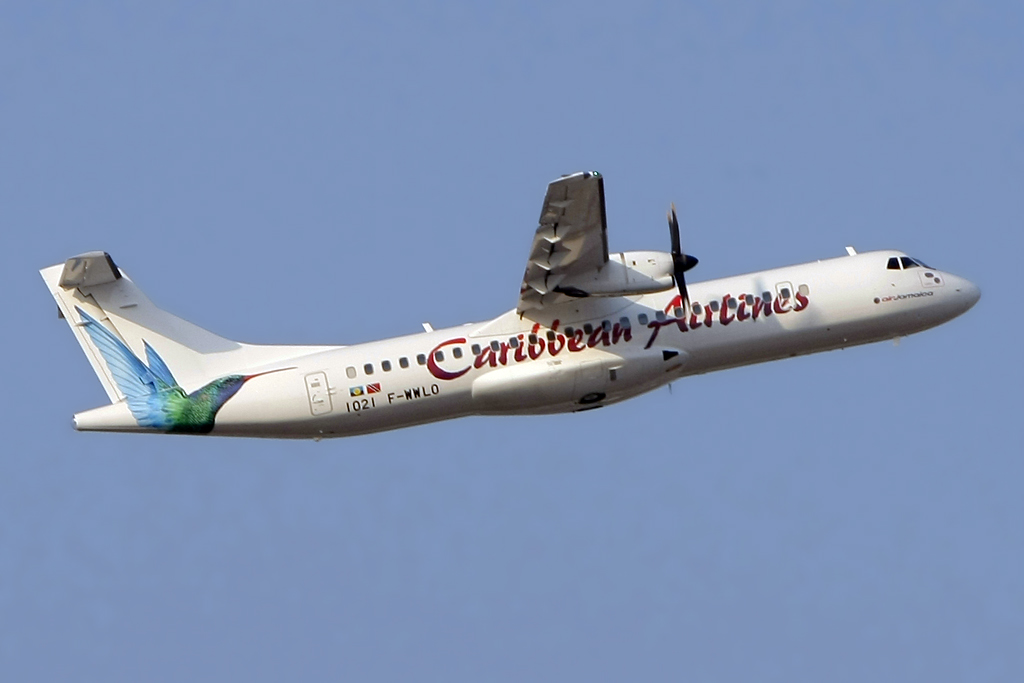
Caribbean Airlines ATR 72–600 in old livery

The colors of Caribbean Airlines are blue, green and purple and are represented in the new staff uniforms, all featuring the hummingbird, the logo of Caribbean Airlines.

BWIA's logo was a steelpan. Caribbean Airlines' image is a hummingbird in flight. The image is a reference to the Republic of Trinidad and Tobago, where the island of Trinidad is known as "the land of the hummingbird". All aircraft in the fleet carry the flag of Trinidad and Tobago, as well as the flag of CARICOM.

The airline had four designs on the tails of its de Havilland Canada DHC-8 Dash 8 regional aircraft before these twin turboprops were phased out of the fleet (9Y-WIT was not painted). One of the designs raised controversy, due to its usage of the Balisier flower, the symbol of the former ruling People's National Movement political party. The logo was subsequently redesigned without the flower and replaced with fruits. The tail designs featured a steelpan, cricket balls, fruits, corals, fish and butterflies.

Caribbean Airlines has a theme song arranged in a traditional Trinidadian calypso music style. It was originally recorded by Explainer and the song is called "Lorraine". The original lyrics, which talk about a man who needs to escape the cold United States and get back to the Caribbean, were modified to fit Caribbean Airlines.

In 2020, the airline rebranded itself by launching a new logo and livery. The first aircraft to receive the new livery, is the airline's 9Y-TTI ATR aircraft. The new logo retains the iconic hummingbird while infusing fluid lines and brighter hues to embody the spirit of flight, the vibrancy of Caribbean culture and connectivity within the region.

=== Awards ===
- 2010 to 2019: The "Caribbean's Leading Airline" - by World Travel Awards
- 2017 to 2021: The "Caribbean's Leading Airline Brand" - by World Travel Awards

== Inflight magazine ==
Caribbean Beat, established in 1992, is Caribbean Airlines' complimentary, bi-monthly in-flight magazine. It has been produced since inception by Media and Editorial Projects Limited. When the print magazine had to be temporarily removed from flights because of the COVID-19 pandemic, a digital-only version was introduced in July 2020, followed by a digital-only brand extension called Wanderer by Caribbean Beat in October 2020. Caribbean Beat Magazine returned to print format in March 2021.

== Frequent flyer program ==
The airline's frequent-flyer program is called Caribbean Miles. The three tiers of the program are called Silver, Gold and Executive Gold.

== Destinations ==
Caribbean Airlines operates scheduled services to many destinations.

=== Interline agreements ===
While there was a prior codeshare agreement between the carrier and Air Canada, Caribbean Airlines no longer undertakes these arrangements and instead has the more streamlined interline agreement alongside their partner airlines: Caribbean Airlines has also Interline agreements with:

- Alaska Airlines
- Copa Airlines
- Emirates
- Hahn Air
- InterCaribbean Airways
- Virgin Atlantic
- Winair

== Fleet ==
As of June 2026, Caribbean Airlines operates the aircraft:

Caribbean Airlines Fleet
Aircraft	In service	Orders	Passengers				Notes
Aircraft	In service	Orders	C	Y+	Y	Total	Notes
ATR 72-600	10	4	—	—	68	68	
Boeing 737 MAX 8	10	2	16	36	108	160	
Embraer E175	—	5	TBA				
Cargo fleet
ATR 72-600F	—	2	Cargo				
Boeing 737-800F	—	2	Cargo				
Total	20	16					

=== Previously operated ===
Caribbean Airlines previously operated the following aircraft:

Caribbean Airlines previous fleet
Aircraft	Total	Introduced	Retired	Notes
Airbus A340-300	2	2007	2007	Taken from BWIA West Indies Airways
Boeing 737-800	21	2007	2023	
Boeing 767-300ER	2	2012	2016	Taken from LAN Airlines
De Havilland Canada Dash 8-300	5	2007	2014	Taken from Tobago Express

== Incidents and accidents ==
- On 30 July 2011, Caribbean Airlines Flight 523 (reg. 9Y-PBM) overran the runway in rainy weather and crashed through the perimeter fence while landing at the Cheddi Jagan International Airport in Guyana. The incident occurred at approximately 1:32 am. The aircraft, a Boeing 737-800, broke into two just behind the first class section of the aircraft cabin. There were no fatalities. Caribbean Airlines confirmed 157 passengers and 6 crew members were on board the aircraft.
