= International Federation of Air Line Pilots' Associations =

International not-for-profit organization of national pilots' associations

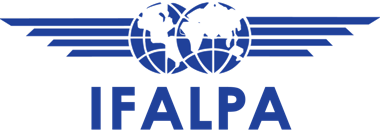
Official logo of IFALPA

The International Federation of Air Line Pilots' Associations (IFALPA) is an international not-for-profit federation of national pilot associations and unions. Founded in April 1948, it is based in Montreal, Quebec, Canada, and represents professional pilots though its Member Associations worldwide.

== History ==
Following the Second World War, as international civil aviation began to recover, the need for greater international cooperation and pilot representation became a priority. Pilot associations sought representation at the newly established United Nations and its specialized agency, the International Civil Aviation Organization. In April 1948, a conference of pilot associations was held in London, resulting in the establishment of the International Federation of Air Line Pilots' Associations (IFALPA). The Federation was based in the United Kingdom until 2012, when it established its headquarters in Montreal, Canada, a world hub of Civil Aviation, in close proximity to ICAO.

== Membership ==
IFALPA represents more than 160,000 pilots in the Member Associations of the more than 70 member associations on its website.

== Connections with ICAO ==
IFALPA has a Permanent Observer status at ICAO's Air Navigation Commission (ANC) and is also Observer to the ICAO Council. Through its Subject Matter Experts in its Standing Committees in regulatory, industrial, and safety/technical areas, IFALPA is represented on numerous ICAO Panels to provide pilot input into regulations, design criteria, air traffic management and airport requirements, amongst many others.

== Current leadership (2025) ==
=== President ===
As of 2025: Capt. Ron Hay

== See also ==
- European Cockpit Association
