= List of Commonwealth Boxing Council champions =

List of Commonwealth Boxing Council champions is a table showing the Commonwealth champions certificated by the Commonwealth Boxing Council (CBC). The CBC is also affiliated with the WBC.

^{v} — Champion vacated title.
^{s} — Champion stripped of title.
(n) — where 'n' is the number of occasions the title has been won.

As of November 2019

== Light-flyweight ==
| No. | Name | Duration of reign | Defences |
|---|---|---|---|
| 4 | (United Kingdom) Craig Derbyshire | 8 December 2023 — present | 2 |
| 3 | (United Kingdom) Matt Windle | 8 October 2022 — 8 December 2023 | 1 |
| 2 | (Ghana) Michael Ebo Danquah | 30 May 1987^{v} | 0 |
| 1 | (United Kingdom) Johnny Hughes | 25 June 1902^{v} | 0 |

== Flyweight ==
| No. | Name | Duration of reign | Defences |
|---|---|---|---|
| 41 | (United Kingdom) Hamza Uddin | 3 October 2026 - present | 0 |
| 40 | (United Kingdom) Conner Kelsall | 28 June 2024 - 1 October 2025^{s} | 0 |
| 39 | (United Kingdom) Jay Harris | 24 February 2024 - 31 May 2024^{v} | 0 |
| 38 | (United Kingdom) Connor Butler | 25 February 2023 - 24 February 2024 | 1 |
| 37 | (United Kingdom) Jay Harris | 24 February 2017 - 29 February 2020^{v} | 1 |
| 36 | (Cameroon) Thomas Essomba | 17 October 2015 — 24 February 2017 | 0 |
| 35 | (United Kingdom) Kevin Satchell | 19 May 2012 — 8 March 2014^{s} | 3 |
| 34 | (United Kingdom) Chris Edwards (2) | 19 February 2010^{s} | 0 |
| 33 | (United Kingdom) Chris Edwards (1) | 23 January 2009 – 26 October 2009^{s} | 1 |
| 32 | (United Kingdom) Lee Haskins | 10 February 2006 – 6 October 2006^{v} | 1 |
| 31 | (United Kingdom) Dale Robinson | 22 February 2003 – 13 March 2004^{s} | 1 |
| 30 | (United Kingdom) Jason Booth | 16 October 1999 – 1 June 2002^{s} | 3 |
| 29 | (United Kingdom) Keith Knox | 22 May 1999 – 16 October 1999 | 0 |
| 28 | (United Kingdom) Damaen Kelly | 12 December 1998 – 22 May 1999 | 1 |
| 27 | (Zimbabwe) (Australia) Alfonso Zvenyika Lambarda | 26 January 1998 – 12 December 1998 | 1 |
| 26 | (United Kingdom) Ady Lewis | 11 September 1997 – 22 November 1997^{v} | 0 |
| 25 | (United Kingdom) Peter Culshaw | 25 June 1996 – 11 September 1997 | 1 |
| 24 | (South Africa) Daniel Ward | 6 March 1995 – 25 June 1996 | 0 |
| 23 | (Ghana) (United Kingdom) Francis Ampofo (2) | 20 December 1994 – 6 March 1995 | 0 |
| 22 | (United Kingdom) Darren Fifield | 13 October 1993 – 20 December 1994 | 1 |
| 21 | (Ghana) (United Kingdom) Francis Ampofo (1) | 29 June 1993 – 1 October 1993^{v} | 0 |
| 20 | (Ghana) Alfred Kotey | 21 October 1989 – 9 July 1991^{s} | 1 |
| 19 | (Ghana) Nana Konadu | 10 October 1987 – 1 May 1987^{s} | 0 |
| 18 | (Jamaica) Richard Clarke | 26 April 1986 – 1 May 1987^{v} | 0 |
| 17 | (United Kingdom) Keith Wallace | 3 February 1983 – 7 December 1983^{v} | 0 |
| 16 | (Kenya) Stephen Muchoki | 17 October 1980 – 3 February 1983 | 0 |
| 15 | (Nigeria) Ray Amoo | 8 February 1980 – 17 October 1980 | 0 |
| 14 | (Zambia) Patrick Mambwe | 3 July 1976 – 2 December 1976^{r} | 0 |
| 13 | (Australia) "Big" Jim West | 13 March 1974 – 28 November 1974^{v} | 0 |
| 12 | (Australia) Henry Nissen | 5 August 1971 – 13 March 1974 | 0 |
| 11 | (United Kingdom) John McCluskey | 16 June 1970 – 5 August 1971 | 0 |
| 10 | (United Kingdom) Walter McGowan | 2 May 1963 – 21 November 1964^{s} | 1 |
| 9 | (United Kingdom) Jackie Brown | 10 December 1962 – 2 May 1963 | 0 |
| 8 | (South Africa) Dennis Adams | 23 October 1957 – 3 March 1962^{s} | 3 |
| 7 | (United Kingdom) Frankie Jones | 31 July 1957 – 23 October 1957 | 0 |
| 6 | (United Kingdom) Dai Dower | 19 October 1954 – 30 March 1957 ^{v} | 2 |
| 5 | (South Africa) Jake Tuli | 8 September 1952 – 19 October 1954 | 0 |
| 4 | (United Kingdom) Teddy Gardner | 17 March 1952 – 8 September 1952 | 0 |
| 3 | (United Kingdom) Rinty Monaghan | 23 March 1948 – 2 April 1950^{r} | 1 |
| 2 | (United Kingdom) Jackie Paterson | 11 March 1940 – 23 March 1948 | 1 |
| 1 | (United Kingdom) Elky Clark | 6 September 1924 – 21 January 1927^{r} | 1 |

== Super-flyweight ==
| No. | Name | Duration of reign | Defences |
|---|---|---|---|
| 11 | (United Kingdom) Ryan Farrag | 21 June 2024 – present | 0 |
| 11 | (United Kingdom) Marcel Braithwaite | 9 June 2023 – ?^{v} | 1 |
| 10 | (United Kingdom) Prince Patel | 27 March 2021 – ?^{v} | 0 |
| 9 | (United Kingdom) Tommy Frank | 15 March 2019 – 2020 | 0 |
| 8 | (Australia) Andrew Moloney | 21 October 2017 | 0 |
| 7 | (Republic of Ireland) Jamie Conlan | 30 April 2016 – March 2017 | 0 |
| 6 | (United Kingdom) Anthony Nelson | 4 April 2015 – 30 April 2016 | 0 |
| 5 | (United Kingdom) Kal Yafai | 21 May 2014 – March 2015 | 0 |
| 4 | (United Kingdom) Paul Butler | 20 April 2013 – April 2014 | 1 |
| 3 | (Nigeria) Yaqub Kareem | 27 August 2011 – 20 April 2013 | 0 |
| 2 | (United Kingdom) Lee Haskins | 11 December 2009^{v} | 0 |
| 1 | (United Kingdom) Don Broadhurst | 31 October 2008 – 11 December 2009 | 2 |

== Bantamweight ==
| No. | Name | Duration of reign | Defences |
|---|---|---|---|
| 49 | (United Kingdom) Andrew Cain | 20 July 2024 - present | 0 |
| 48 | (United Kingdom) Ashley Lane | 22 March 2024 - present | 1 |
| 47 | (United Kingdom) Sean McGoldrick | 10 February 2023 - ? | 0 |
| 46 | (United Kingdom) Lee McGregor | 13 October 2018^{v} | 2 |
| 45 | (Australia) Jason Moloney | 24 February 2018^{v} | 0 |
| 44 | (Ghana) Duke Micah | 12 November 2016^{v} | 0 |
| 43 | (United Kingdom) Jason Cunningham | 15 May 2015 – October 2015 | 0 |
| 42 | (United Kingdom) Ross Burkinshaw | 6 September 2014 – April 2015 | 0 |
| 41 | (United Kingdom) Martin Ward | 7 December 2013 – August 2014 | 0 |
| 40 | (United Kingdom) Stuart Hall | 16 November 2012 – April 2013^{v} | 0 |
| 39 | (United Kingdom) Jamie McDonnell | 22 January 2010 – 3 September 2011^{v} | 2 |
| 38 | (United Kingdom) Jason Booth | 8 December 2007 – 18 January 2010^{v} | 2 |
| 37 | (South Africa) Tshifhiwa Munyai | 26 June 2006 – 15 October 2007^{s} | 2 |
| 36 | (Ghana) Joseph Agbeko | 29 October 2004 – 4 November 2005^{s} | 0 |
| 35 | (Canada) Steve Molitor | 21 September 2002 – 17 March 2004^{s} | 0 |
| 34 | (United Kingdom) Nicky Booth | 9 October 2000 – 21 September 2002 | 4 |
| 33 | (United Kingdom) Tommy Waite | 9 September 2000 – 9 October 2000 | 0 |
| 32 | (United Kingdom) Ady Lewis | 1 April 2000 – 9 September 2000 | 0 |
| 31 | (United Kingdom) Paul Lloyd | 7 October 1996 – 3 April 1999^{v} | 4 |
| 30 | (United Kingdom) Johnny Armour | 30 April 1992 – 29 November 1995^{r} | 5 |
| 29 | (The Bahamas) Ray Minus | 27 September 1986 – 2 September 1990^{v} | 5 |
| 28 | (Australia) Paul Ferreri (2) | 21 May 1981 – 27 September 1986 | 5 |
| 27 | (United Kingdom) Johnny Owen | 2 November 1978 – 4 November 1980^{r} | 2 |
| 26 | (Ghana) Sulley Shittu | 29 January 1977 – 13 May 1978^{s} | 0 |
| 25 | (Australia) Paul Ferreri (1) | 16 September 1972 – 29 January 1977 | 3 |
| 24 | (United Kingdom) Alan Rudkin (3) | 21 April 1970 – 25 January 1972^{r} | 3 |
| 23 | (Australia) Lionel Rose | 8 March 1969 – 19 December 1969^{v} | 0 |
| 22 | (United Kingdom) Alan Rudkin (2) | 13 May 1968 – 8 March 1969 | 0 |
| 21 | (United Kingdom) Walter McGowan | 6 September 1966 – 13 May 1968 | 0 |
| 20 | (United Kingdom) Alan Rudkin (1) | 22 March 1965 – 6 September 1966 | 0 |
| 19 | (United Kingdom) Johnny Caldwell | 5 March 1964 – 22 March 1965 | 0 |
| 18 | (United Kingdom) Freddie Gilroy | 10 January 1959 – 20 October 1962^{r} | 4 |
| 17 | (United Kingdom) Peter Keenan | 28 March 1955 – 10 January 1959 | 5 |
| 16 | (Australia) Jimmy Carruthers | 15 November 1952 – 13 November 1953^{v} | 1 |
| 15 | (South Africa) Vic Toweel | 12 November 1949 – 15 November 1952 | 3 |
| 14 | (United Kingdom) Stan Rowan | 24 March 1949 – 12 November 1949 | 0 |
| 13 | (United Kingdom) Jackie Paterson | 12 September 1945 – 24 March 1949 | 1 |
| 12 | (United Kingdom) Jim Brady | 10 January 1941 – 12 September 1945 | 1 |
| 11 | (United Kingdom) Dick Corbett (2) | 12 February 1934 – 20 January 1936^{s} | 1 |
| 10 | (United Kingdom) Johnny King | 10 October 1932 – 12 February 1934 | 1 |
| 9 | (United Kingdom) Dick Corbett (1) | 22 May 1930 – 10 October 1932 | 1 |
| 8 | (United Kingdom) Teddy Baldock | 29 August 1928 – 3 April 1930^{v} | 1 |
| 7 | (Australia) "Young" Billy McAllister | 7 July 1928 – July 1928^{v} | 2 |
| 6 | (United Kingdom) Johnny Brown | 26 November 1923 – June 1927^{v} | 2 |
| 5 | (United Kingdom) Harry Lake | 26 February 1923 – 26 November 1923 | 0 |
| 4 | (United Kingdom) Tommy Harrison | 26 June 1922 – 26 February 1923 | 0 |
| 4 | (United Kingdom) Jim Higgins | 26 April 1920 – 26 June 1922 | 0 |
| 3 | (Australia) Charlie Simpson | 30 October 1911 – 22 January 1912^{v} | 1 |
| 2 | (United Kingdom) Owen Moran | 23 January 1905^{v} | 0 |
| 1 | (United Kingdom) Digger Stanley | 19 November 1904 – 23 January 1905 | 0 |

== Super-bantamweight ==
| No. | Name | Duration of reign | Defences |
|---|---|---|---|
| 22 | (United Kingdom) Dennis McCann | 26 November 2022 - Present | 0 |
| 21 | (South Africa) Zolani Tete | 2 July 2022^{v} | 0 |
| 20 | (United Kingdom) Jason Cunningham | 9 October 2021 – 2 July 2022 | 0 |
| 19 | (United Kingdom) Brad Foster | 18 May 2019 – 9 October 2021 | 3 |
| 18 | (United Kingdom) Ashley Lane | 23 September 2017 – 18 May 2019 | 0 |
| 17 | (United Kingdom) Robbie Turley | 7 April 2017^{v} | 0 |
| 16 | (United Kingdom) Gamal Yafai | 5 March 2016 – 30 July 2016^{v} | 1 |
| 15 | (United Kingdom) Bobby Jenkinson | 26 September 2015 – 5 March 2016 | 0 |
| 14 | (United Kingdom) Kid Galahad | 10 May 2014^{v} | 0 |
| 13 | (United Kingdom) Carl Frampton | 10 September 2011 – April 2014^{v} | 3 |
| 12 | (United Kingdom) Jason Booth | 5 February 2010 – 5 February 2011^{v} | 0 |
| 11 | (United Kingdom) Rendall Munroe | 2 May 2009 – 1 February 2010^{v} | 0 |
| 10 | (Ghana) Anyetei Laryea | 12 October 2007 – 31 March 2009^{s} | 0 |
| 9 | (United Kingdom) Isaac Ward | 28 January 2007 – 12 October 2007 | 0 |
| 8 | (United Kingdom) Michael Hunter | 28 October 2005 – 10 November 2006^{v} | 0 |
| 7 | (United Kingdom) Esham Pickering | 8 February 2003 – 28 October 2005 | 2 |
| 6 | (United Kingdom) Michael Alldis | 18 March 2002 – 2 November 2002^{r} | 1 |
| 5 | (United Kingdom) Brian Carr | 3 November 2001 – 18 March 2002 | 1 |
| 4 | (Australia) Nedal Hussein | 18 March 2000 – 12 May 2001^{s} | 1 |
| 3 | (United Kingdom) Michael Brodie | 1 November 1997 – 10 March 1999^{v} | 2 |
| 2 | (United Kingdom) Neil Swain | 12 April 1995 – 22 March 1997^{r} | 2 |
| 1 | (Australia) Paul Ferreri | 15 September 1977 – 2 November 1978^{v} | 0 |

== Featherweight ==
| No. | Name | Duration of reign | Defences |
|---|---|---|---|
| 51 | (United Kingdom) Zak Miller | 8 February 2025– present | 1 |
| 50 | (United Kingdom) Masood Abdulah | 6 September 2024 – 8 February 2025 | 1 |
| 49 | (United Kingdom) Nathaniel Collins | 31 July 2021 – May 2024^{v} | 5 |
| 48 | (United Kingdom) Leigh Wood | 2 March 2019^{v} | 1 |
| 47 | (United Kingdom) Jordan Gill | 27 October 2018^{v} | 0 |
| 46 | (United Kingdom) Ryan Doyle | 6 June 2018 – 27 October 2018 | 0 |
| 45 | (United Kingdom) Reece Bellotti | 13 October 2017 – 6 June 2018 | 1 |
| 44 | (United Kingdom) Jason Cunningham | 8 April 2017 – 13 October 2017 | 0 |
| 43 | (United Kingdom) Isaac Lowe | 27 February 2016^{v} | 0 |
| 42 | (United Kingdom) Josh Warrington | 2 November 2013 – 5 September 2015^{v} | 3 |
| 41 | (United Kingdom) Lee Selby | 17 September 2011 – October 2013^{v} | 4 |
| 40 | (United Kingdom) Stephen Smith | 4 September 2010 – 14 December 2011 | 1 |
| 39 | (United Kingdom) John Simpson | 16 January 2009 – 4 September 2010 | 3 |
| 38 | (United Kingdom) Paul Truscott | 9 May 2008 – 16 January 2009 | 0 |
| 37 | (Australia) Jackson Asiku | 18 November 2005 – 24 March 2008^{v} | 2 |
| 36 | (United Kingdom) Nicky Cook | 31 May 2003 – October 2005^{v} | 3 |
| 35 | (United Kingdom) Scott Harrison | 5 February 2000 – January 2003^{v} | 4 |
| 34 | (United Kingdom) Patrick Mullings | 29 November 1999 – 5 February 2000 | 0 |
| 33 | (United Kingdom) Paul Ingle | 11 October 1997 – October 1999 | 2 |
| 32 | (United Kingdom) Jon Jo Irwin | 11 October 1996 – 11 October 1997 | 1 |
| 31 | (United Kingdom) Billy Hardy | 7 October 1992 – September 1996^{v} | 5 |
| 30 | (United Kingdom) Colin McMillan | 18 January 1992 – September 1992^{v} | 0 |
| 29 | (Canada) Barrington Francis | 17 April 1991 – December 1991^{v} | 0 |
| 28 | (Kenya) Modesty Napunyi | 28 January 1990 – 17 April 1991 | 1 |
| 27 | (Ghana) Percy Commey | 22 April 1989 – 28 January 1990 | 0 |
| 26 | (Ghana) George Ayeh | 5 November 1988 – 22 April 1989 | 0 |
| 25 | (Barbados) Tyrone Downes | 28 February 1986 – October 1988^{v} | 1 |
| 24 | (Ghana) Azumah Nelson | 26 September 1981 – January 1986^{v} | 3 |
| 23 | (Guyana) Patrick Ford | 1 August 1980 – August 1981^{v} | 0 |
| 22 | (Zambia) Charm Chiteule | 4 May 1980 – July 1980^{v} | 0 |
| 21 | (Nigeria) Eddie Ndukwu | 17 June 1977 – April 1980^{v} | 3 |
| 20 | (Ghana) David Kotei | 7 December 1974 – May 1977^{v} | 0 |
| 19 | (United Kingdom) Evan Armstrong | 5 April 1974 – 7 December 1974 | 1 |
| 18 | (Australia) Bobby Dunne | 6 November 1972 – 5 April 1974 | 0 |
| 17 | (New Zealand) Toro George | 12 December 1970 – 6 November 1972 | 1 |
| 16 | (Australia) Johnny Famechon | 24 November 1967 – November 1970 | 1 |
| 15 | (United Kingdom) John O'Brien | 3 February 1967 – 24 November 1967 | 0 |
| 14 | (Ghana) Floyd Robertson | 26 November 1960 – 3 February 1967 | 2 |
| 13 | (Trinidad and Tobago) Percy Lewis | 9 December 1957 – 26 November 1960 | 1 |
| 12 | (Nigeria) Hogan Bassey | 19 November 1955 – November 1957^{v} | 1 |
| 11 | (United Kingdom) Billy Kelly | 2 October 1954 – 19 November 1955 | 1 |
| 10 | (Ghana) Roy Ankrah | 30 April 1951 – 2 October 1954 | ? |
| 9 | (United Kingdom) Ronnie Clayton | 11 September 1947 – 30 April 1951 | 4 |
| 8 | (United Kingdom) Al Phillips | 18 March 1947 – 11 September 1947 | 1 |
| 7 | (United Kingdom) Nel Tarleton | 1 February 1940 – February 1947^{v} | 2 |
| 6 | (United Kingdom) Nipper Johnny Cusick | 28 June 1939 – 1 February 1940 | 0 |
| 5 | (United Kingdom) Jim Kelly | 23 November 1938 – 28 June 1939 | 0 |
| 4 | (United Kingdom) Johnny McGrory | 26 December 1936 – October 1938^{v} | 0 |
| 3 | (Canada) Leo Roy | 15 August 1923 – November 1936^{v} | 0 |
| 2 | (United Kingdom) Llew Edwards | 31 May 1915 – July 1923^{v} | 1 |
| 1 | (United Kingdom) Jim Driscoll | 24 February 1908 – May 1915^{v} | 2 |

== Super-featherweight ==
| No. | Name | Duration of reign | Defences |
|---|---|---|---|
| 31 | (United Kingdom) Royston Barney-Smith | 17 April 2026 – present | 0 |
| 30 | (United Kingdom) Ryan Garner | 26 July 2025 – ?^{v} | 0 |
| 29 | (United Kingdom) Reece Bellotti | 21 October 2023 – 26 July 2025 | 3 |
| 28 | (United Kingdom) Zelfa Barrett | 15 June 2019 – ?^{v} | 1 |
| 27 | (United Kingdom) James Tennyson | 5 May 2018 | 0 |
| 26 | (United Kingdom) Martin Joseph Ward | 15 July 2017 – 5 May 2018 | 0 |
| 25 | (United Kingdom) Liam Walsh | 23 October 2010 – 28 February 2015^{v} | 5 |
| 24 | (United Kingdom) Ricky Burns | 26 September 2008 – September 2009^{v} | 2 |
| 23 | (United Kingdom) Kevin Mitchell | 28 October 2006 – August 2008^{v} | 2 |
| 22 | (United Kingdom) Alex Arthur | 8 April 2005 – September 2006^{v} | 1 |
| 21 | (United Kingdom) Craig Docherty | 12 April 2003 – 8 April 2005 | 2 |
| 20 | (United Kingdom) Dean Pithie | 13 July 2002 – 12 April 2003 | 0 |
| 19 | (United Kingdom) Alex Moon | 20 March 2001 – 13 July 2002 | 2 |
| 18 | (Ghana) James Armah | 18 September 2000 – February 2001^{v} | 0 |
| 17 | (United Kingdom) Ian McLeod | 19 February 2000 – August 2000^{v} | 0 |
| 16 | (Australia) Mick O'Malley | 22 October 1999 – 19 February 2000 | 0 |
| 15 | (United Kingdom) Charles Shepherd | 22 January 1999 – September 1999^{v} | 1 |
| 14 | (Uganda) Justin Juuko | 30 September 1995 – December 1998^{v} | 3 |
| 13 | (Canada) Tony Pep | 11 February 1992 – 30 September 1995 | 2 |
| 12 | (United Kingdom) Paul Harvey | 12 November 1991 – 11 February 1992 | 1 |
| 11 | (United Kingdom) Hugh Forde | 10 September 1991 – 12 November 1991 | 0 |
| 10 | (Ghana) George Ayeh | 26 November 1990 – 10 September 1991 | 1 |
| 9 | (United Kingdom) Mark Reefer | 19 September 1989 – October 1990^{v} | 2 |
| 8 | (Zambia) John Sichula (3) | 29 August 1987 – 19 September 1989 | 3 |
| 7 | (Ghana) Sam Akromah | 26 October 1986 – 29 August 1987 | 0 |
| 6 | (Zambia) John Sichula (2) | 8 June 1985 – 26 October 1986 | 0 |
| 5 | (Australia) Lester Ellis | 16 November 1984 – May 1985^{v} | 0 |
| 4 | (Zambia) John Sichula (1) | 4 February 1984 – 16 November 1984 | 0 |
| 3 | (Zimbabwe) Langton Tinago | 7 May 1983 – 4 February 1984 | 0 |
| 2 | (Papua New Guinea) Johnny Aba | 1 December 1977 – April 1983^{v} | 6 |
| 1 | (Australia) Billy Moeller | 13 May 1975 – 1 December 1977 | 2 |

== Lightweight ==
| No. | Name | Duration of reign | Defences |
|---|---|---|---|
| 57 | (United Kingdom) Louie O'Doherty | 16 May 2026 - present | 0 |
| 56 | (United Kingdom) Sam Noakes | 26 November 2022 - 2026^{v} | 3 |
| 55 | (United Kingdom) Gavin Gwynne | 19 February 2021^{v} | 2 |
| 54 | (United Kingdom) Joe Cordina | 4 August 2018 – 2019 | 2 |
| 53 | (United Kingdom) Tommy Coyle | 21 April 2018^{v} | 0 |
| 52 | (United Kingdom) Sean Dodd | 22 April 2017 – 21 April 2018 | 1 |
| 51 | (United Kingdom) Luke Campbell | 26 March 2016 – 15 October 2016^{v} | 1 |
| 50 | (Ghana) Richard Commey | 12 July 2014 – 14 March 2015^{v} | 1 |
| 49 | (United Kingdom) Derry Mathews | 28 July 2013 – June 2014 | 1 |
| 48 | (Ghana) George Ashie | 14 April 2012 – February 2013^{v} | 0 |
| 47 | (United Kingdom) Lee McAllister | 19 June 2009 – 29 January 2010^{v} | 2 |
| 46 | (United Kingdom) Amir Khan | 14 July 2007 – 5 June 2009^{v} | 4 |
| 45 | (United Kingdom) Willie Limond | 4 November 2006 – 14 July 2007 | 0 |
| 44 | (United Kingdom) Graham Earl | 19 June 2005 – October 2006^{v} | 0 |
| 43 | (United Kingdom) Kevin Bennett | 8 November 2003 – 19 June 2005 | 1 |
| 42 | (Kenya) Michael Muya | 29 March 2003 – 8 November 2003 | 0 |
| 41 | (United Kingdom) David Burke | 7 September 2002 – February 2003^{v} | 0 |
| 40 | (Ghana) James Armah | 3 February 2001 – August 2002^{v} | 0 |
| 39 | (United Kingdom) Bobby Vanzie | 28 May 1999 – 3 February 2001 | 5 |
| 38 | (Ghana) David Tetteh (2) | 4 March 1997 – April 1999^{v} | 1 |
| 37 | (Canada) William Irwin | 11 October 1996 – 4 March 1997 | 0 |
| 36 | (Ghana) David Tetteh (1) | 25 November 1995 – 11 October 1996 | 0 |
| 35 | (United Kingdom) Billy Schwer (2) | 10 November 1993 – 25 November 1995 | 4 |
| 34 | (United Kingdom) Paul Burke | 24 February 1993 – 10 November 1993 | 0 |
| 33 | (United Kingdom) Billy Schwer (1) | 28 October 1992 – 24 February 1993 | 0 |
| 32 | (United Kingdom) Carl Crook | 21 March 1990 – 28 October 1992 | 5 |
| 31 | (United Kingdom) Najib Daho | 31 May 1989 – 21 March 1990 | 1 |
| 30 | (United Kingdom) Pat Doherty | 25 January 1989 – 31 May 1989 | 0 |
| 29 | (United Kingdom) Mo Hussein | 4 March 1987 – 25 January 1989 | 3 |
| 28 | (Zimbabwe) Langton Tinago (2) | 23 August 1986 – February 1987^{v} | 0 |
| 27 | (Australia) Barry Michael (2) | 22 February 1985 – July 1986^{v} | 0 |
| 26 | (Australia) Graeme Brooke | 2 November 1984 – 22 February 1985 | 0 |
| 25 | (Trinidad and Tobago) Claude Noel | 22 July 1982 – 2 November 1984 | 2 |
| 24 | (Australia) Barry Michael (1) | 6 May 1981 – 22 July 1982 | 2 |
| 23 | (Zimbabwe) Langton Tinago (1) | 7 December 1980 – 6 May 1981 | 1 |
| 22 | (Nigeria) Hogan Jimoh | 25 October 1978 – 7 December 1980 | 1 |
| 21 | (Guyana) Lennox Blackmoore | 1 October 1977 – 25 October 1978 | 0 |
| 20 | (Nigeria) Jonathan Dele | 3 May 1975 – 1 October 1977 | 2 |
| 19 | (Jamaica) Percy Hayles | 28 July 1968 – April 1975^{v} | 4 |
| 18 | (Ghana) Love Allotey | 7 October 1967 – 28 July 1968 | 0 |
| 17 | (New Zealand) Manny Santos | 15 March 1967 – September 1967^{v} | 0 |
| 16 | (Jamaica) Bunny Grant | 4 August 1962 – 15 March 1967 | 1 |
| 15 | (New Zealand) Paul Fitzsimmons | 1960 – 1961 | 0 |
| 14 | (United Kingdom) Dave Charnley | 12 May 1959 – 4 August 1962 | 1 |
| 13 | (South Africa) Willie Toweel | 16 June 1956 – 12 May 1959 | 4 |
| 12 | (South Africa) Johnny van Rensburg | 12 February 1955 – 16 June 1956 | 3 |
| 11 | (Australia) Pat Ford (2) | 2 July 1954 – January 1955^{v} | 0 |
| 10 | (Barbados) Ivor Germain | 9 April 1954 – 2 July 1954 | 0 |
| 9 | (Australia) Pat Ford (1) | 28 August 1953 – 9 April 1954 | 1 |
| 8 | (United Kingdom) Frank Johnson | 23 January 1953 – 28 August 1953 | 0 |
| 7 | (Canada) Arthur King | 1 October 1948 – December 1952 | 0 |
| 6 | (South Africa) Laurie Stevens | 11 January 1936 – September 1948^{v} | 0 |
| 5 | (United Kingdom) Al Foreman (2) | 22 May 1933 – December 1935^{v} | 2 |
| 4 | (Australia) Jimmy Kelso | 24 April 1933 – 22 May 1933 | 0 |
| 3 | (United Kingdom) Al Foreman (1) | 21 May 1930 – 24 April 1933 | 2 |
| 2 | (Australia) Tommy Fairhall | 2 June 1928 – April 1930^{v} | 0 |
| 1 | (United Kingdom) Freddie Welsh | 16 December 1912 – May 1927^{v} | 0 |

== Super-lightweight ==
| No. | Name | Duration of reign | Defences |
|---|---|---|---|
| 35 | (United Kingdom) Sam Maxwell | 28 August 2021 – present | 0 |
| 34 | (United Kingdom) Akeem Ennis-Brown | 2 September 2020 – 28 August 2021 | 0 |
| 33 | (United Kingdom) Philip Bowes | 2 February 2019 – 2 September 2020 | 1 |
| 32 | (United Kingdom) Robbie Davies Jr. | 13 October 2018^{v} | 0 |
| 31 | (United Kingdom) Glenn Foot | 3 March 2018 – 13 October 2018 | 0 |
| 30 | (United Kingdom) Josh Taylor | 21 October 2016 – 8 July 2017^{v} | 2 |
| 29 | (United Kingdom) John Wayne Hibbert | 12 September 2015 – 30 January 2016^{v} | 1 |
| 28 | (United Kingdom) Dave Ryan | 4 October 2014 – 12 September 2015 | 1 |
| 27 | (United Kingdom) Willie Limond | 21 January 2013 – September 2014 | 2 |
| 26 | (United Kingdom) Lee McAllister | 11 June 2011^{v} | 0 |
| 25 | (Nigeria) Ajose Olusegun | 15 June 2007 – 3 April 2010^{v} | 4 |
| 24 | (United Kingdom) Junior Witter | 8 July 2002 – 15 September 2006^{v} | 3 |
| 23 | (United Kingdom) Eamonn Magee | 13 September 1999 – 1 June 2002^{v} | 5 |
| 22 | (United Kingdom) Paul Burke (2) | 30 November 1998 – 13 September 1999 | 1 |
| 21 | (Zambia) Felix Bwalya | 13 December 1997 – October 1998^{v} | 0 |
| 20 | (United Kingdom) Paul Burke (1) | 30 August 1997 – 13 December 1997 | 0 |
| 19 | (United Kingdom) Bernard Paul | 22 April 1997 – 30 August 1997 | 0 |
| 18 | (United Kingdom) Andy Holligan (2) | 13 July 1996 – March 1997^{v} | 0 |
| 17 | (United Kingdom) Paul Ryan | 9 December 1995 – 13 July 1996 | 0 |
| 16 | (United Kingdom) Ross Hale | 25 May 1994 – 9 December 1995 | 3 |
| 15 | (United Kingdom) Andy Holligan (1) | 20 June 1991 – 25 May 1994 | 3 |
| 14 | (United Kingdom) Tony Ekubia | 26 September 1989 – 20 June 1991 | 3 |
| 13 | (The Bahamas) Steve Larrimore | 21 March 1989 – 26 September 1989 | 0 |
| 12 | (Australia) Lester Ellis | 4 August 1988 – 21 March 1989 | 1 |
| 11 | (United Kingdom) Tony Laing | 24 October 1987 – 4 August 1988 | 0 |
| 10 | (Nigeria) Billy Famous | 28 May 1983 – September 1987^{v} | 2 |
| 9 | (Nigeria) Obisia Nwankpa | 3 March 1979 – 28 May 1983 | 3 |
| 8 | (Australia) Jeff Malcolm | 24 September 1978 – 3 March 1979 | 1 |
| 7 | (Australia) Lawrence Austin (2) | 15 September 1977 – 24 September 1978 | 1 |
| 6 | (Australia) Hector Thompson (3) | 16 June 1977 – 15 September 1977 | 0 |
| 5 | (Australia) Lawrence Austin (1) | 28 April 1977 – 16 June 1977 | 0 |
| 4 | (Australia) Hector Thompson (2) | 19 May 1975 – 28 April 1977 | 3 |
| 3 | (United Kingdom) Des Morrison | 27 November 1973 – April 1975^{v} | 0 |
| 2 | (Australia) Hector Thompson (1) | 26 March 1973 – October 1973^{v} | 1 |
| 1 | (Ghana) Joe Tetteh | 21 September 1972 – 26 March 1973 | 0 |

== Welterweight ==
| No. | Name | Duration of reign | Defences |
|---|---|---|---|
| 57 | (United Kingdom) Constantin Ursu | 30 March 2025 - present | 0 |
| 56 | (United Kingdom) Conah Walker | 25 January 2025 - ? | 0 |
| 55 | (United Kingdom) Harry Scarff | 18 November 2023 - 25 January 2025 | 1 |
| 54 | (United Kingdom) Ekow Essuman | 24 July 2021 - 18 November 2023 | 5 |
| 53 | (United Kingdom) Chris Jenkins | 3 August 2019 – 24 July 2021 | 3 |
| 52 | (United Kingdom) Josh Kelly | 16 June 2018 – 2018 | 0 |
| 51 | (Australia) Kris George | 25 November 2016 – 16 June 2018 | 1 |
| 50 | (United Kingdom) Bradley Skeete | 5 March 2016 – 2016 | 0 |
| 49 | (United Kingdom) Sam Eggington | 9 May 2015 – 5 March 2016 | 2 |
| 48 | (United Kingdom) Frankie Gavin | 29 November 2014 – April 2015 | 0 |
| 47 | (Sierra Leone) Leonard Bundu | 1 August 2014 – October 2014 | 0 |
| 46 | (United Kingdom) Frankie Gavin | 28 June 2013 – 1 August 2014 | 2 |
| 45 | (United Kingdom) Denton Vassell | 16 April 2010 – 28 June 2013 | 3 |
| 44 | (United Kingdom) John O'Donnell | 11 April 2009 – 29 March 2010^{v} | 0 |
| 43 | (United Kingdom) Craig Watson | 8 December 2007 – 11 April 2009 | 1 |
| 42 | (Namibia) Paulus Ali Nuumbembe | 16 February 2007 – 8 December 2007 | 0 |
| 41 | (United Kingdom) Kevin Anderson | 30 September 2005 – 16 February 2007 | 2 |
| 40 | (Ghana) Joshua Okine | 4 March 2005 – 30 September 2005 | 1 |
| 39 | (Nigeria) Fatai Onikeke | 17 September 2004 – 4 March 2005 | 0 |
| 38 | (Ghana) Ossie Duran | 26 December 2003 – August 2004^{v} | 0 |
| 37 | (United Kingdom) James Hare | 27 April 2002 – November 2003 | 3 |
| 36 | (Australia) Julian Holland | 17 August 2001 – 27 April 2002 | 0 |
| 35 | (United Kingdom) Jawaid Khaliq | 27 November 2000 – July 2001^{v} | 0 |
| 34 | (United Kingdom) Scott Dixon | 5 February 2000 – October 2000^{v} | 1 |
| 33 | (Ghana) Kofi Jantuah | 1 November 1997 – January 2000^{v} | 1 |
| 32 | (Guyana) Andrew Murray | 5 October 1993 – October 1997 | 2 |
| 31 | (United Kingdom) Eamonn Loughran | 24 November 1992 – September 1993^{v} | 1 |
| 30 | (Canada) Donovan Boucher | 23 November 1989 – 24 November 1992 | 5 |
| 29 | (United Kingdom) Gary Jacobs | 19 April 1988 – 23 November 1989 | 3 |
| 28 | (Australia) Wilf Gentzen | 28 August 1987 – 19 April 1988 | 1 |
| 27 | (Australia) Brian Janssen | 6 April 1987 – July 1987^{v} | 0 |
| 26 | (United Kingdom) Lloyd Honeyghan | 27 November 1985 – March 1987^{v} | 0 |
| 25 | (United Kingdom) Sylvester Mittee | 10 October 1984 – 27 November 1985 | 2 |
| 24 | (United Kingdom) Colin Jones | 3 March 1981 – September 1984^{v} | 2 |
| 23 | (Canada) Clyde Gray (2) | 13 November 1979 – February 1981^{v} | 0 |
| 22 | (Canada) Chris Clarke | 28 August 1979 – 13 November 1979 | 0 |
| 21 | (Canada) Clyde Gray (1) | 12 February 1973 – 28 August 1979 | 7 |
| 20 | (United Kingdom) Ralph Charles | 20 February 1968 – January 1973^{v} | 3 |
| 19 | (United Kingdom) Johnny Cooke | 16 October 1967 – 20 February 1968 | 0 |
| 18 | (United Kingdom) Brian Curvis | 9 May 1960 – September 1967^{v} | 7 |
| 17 | (Australia) George Barnes (3) | 18 August 1958 – 9 May 1960 | 2 |
| 16 | (South Africa) Johnny van Rensburg | 17 May 1958 – 18 August 1958 | 0 |
| 15 | (Australia) George Barnes (2) | 12 November 1956 – 17 May 1958 | 1 |
| 14 | (Australia) Darby Brown | 6 August 1956 – 12 November 1956 | 0 |
| 13 | (Australia) George Barnes (1) | 24 November 1954 – 6 August 1956 | 2 |
| 12 | (United Kingdom) Wally Thom (2) | 19 October 1954 – October 1954^{v} | 0 |
| 11 | (New Zealand) Barry Brown | 15 January 1954 – September 1954^{v} | 0 |
| 10 | (South Africa) Gerald Dreyer | 8 December 1952 – 15 January 1954 | 0 |
| 9 | (United Kingdom) Cliff Curvis | 24 July 1952 – 8 December 1952 | 0 |
| 8 | (United Kingdom) Wally Thom (1) | 16 October 1951 – 24 July 1952 | 0 |
| 7 | (United Kingdom) Eddie Thomas | 27 January 1951 – 16 October 1951 | 0 |
| 6 | (United Kingdom) Tommy Milligan | 26 November 1924 – December 1950^{v} | 0 |
| 5 | (United Kingdom) Ted Lewis | 9 June 1920 – 26 November 1924 | 1 |
| 4 | (United Kingdom) Johnny Basham | 13 November 1919 – 9 June 1920 | 1 |
| 3 | (United Kingdom) Matt Wells | 21 March 1914 – 13 November 1919 | 0 |
| 2 | (United Kingdom) Tom McCormick | 10 January 1914 – 21 March 1914 | 1 |
| 1 | (United Kingdom) Johnny Summers | 11 June 1913 – 10 January 1914 | 1 |

== Super-welterweight ==
| No. | Name | Duration of reign | Defences |
|---|---|---|---|
| 40 | (United Kingdom) Bilal Fawaz | 21 February 2026 - present | 0 |
| 39 | (United Kingdom) Ishmael Davis | 15 November 2025 - 21 February 2026 | 1 |
| 38 | (United Kingdom) Sam Gilley | 21 October 2023 - 15 November 2025 | 2 |
| 37 | (United Kingdom) Louis Greene | 26 November 2022 - 21 October 2023 | 2 |
| 36 | (Australia) Tim Tszyu | 7 July 2021^{v} | 0 |
| 35 | (United Kingdom) James Metcalf | 15 June 2019^{v} | 0 |
| 34 | (Australia) Michael Zerafa | 16 March 2018 – 2018 | 0 |
| 33 | (Australia) Anthony Buttigieg | 3 March 2017 – 2017 | 0 |
| 32 | (United Kingdom) Liam Williams | 24 November 2014 – 2016 | 1 |
| 31 | (United Kingdom) Liam Smith | 15 December 2012 – October 2014 | 0 |
| 30 | (United Kingdom) Jamie Cox | 9 September 2011^{v} | 0 |
| 29 | (Ghana) Obodai Sai | 18 June 2011 – 9 September 2011 | 0 |
| 28 | (United Kingdom) Craig Watson | 16 April 2010^{v} | 0 |
| 27 | (United Kingdom) Anthony Small | 18 July 2009 – 8 January 2010^{v} | 1 |
| 26 | (United Kingdom) Matthew Hall | 14 March 2009 – 18 July 2009 | 0 |
| 25 | (United Kingdom) Bradley Pryce | 11 March 2006 – 14 March 2009 | 6 |
| 24 | (Ghana) Ossie Duran | 26 June 2004 – 11 March 2006 | 1 |
| 23 | (United Kingdom) Jamie Moore (2) | 10 April 2004 – 26 June 2004 | 0 |
| 22 | (United Kingdom) Richard Williams (2) | 31 January 2004 – March 2004^{v} | 0 |
| 21 | (United Kingdom) Jamie Moore (1) | 19 April 2003 – December 2003^{v} | 1 |
| 20 | (United Kingdom) Michael Jones | 28 May 2002 – 19 April 2003 | 0 |
| 19 | (Kenya) Joshua Onyango | 23 March 2002 – 28 May 2002 | 0 |
| 18 | (United Kingdom) Richard Williams (1) | 23 January 2001 – February 2002^{v} | 2 |
| 17 | (Canada) Tony Badea | 24 June 1999 – 23 January 2001 | 1 |
| 16 | (Australia) Kevin Kelly (2) | 15 August 1997 – May 1999^{v} | 0 |
| 15 | (United Kingdom) Steve Foster | 6 July 1996 – July 1997^{v} | 0 |
| 14 | (United Kingdom) Chris Pyatt (2) | 16 December 1995 – 6 July 1996 | 0 |
| 13 | (Australia) Kevin Kelly (1) | 10 September 1995 – 16 December 1995 | 0 |
| 12 | (Australia) Leo Young Jr | 30 October 1994 – 10 September 1995 | 0 |
| 11 | (United Kingdom) Lloyd Honeyghan | 30 January 1993 – September 1994^{v} | 1 |
| 10 | (United Kingdom) Mickey Hughes | 15 September 1992 – 30 January 1993 | 0 |
| 9 | (United Kingdom) Chris Pyatt (1) | 5 November 1991 – August 1992^{v} | 2 |
| 8 | (Australia) Troy Waters | 16 August 1987 – October 1991^{v} | 3 |
| 7 | (United Kingdom) Lloyd Hibbert | 11 March 1987 – 16 August 1987 | 0 |
| 6 | (United Kingdom) Nicky Wilshire | 5 June 1985 – 11 March 1987 | 0 |
| 5 | (United Kingdom) Ken Salisbury | 21 August 1984 – 5 June 1985 | 0 |
| 4 | (United Kingdom) Herol Graham | 25 November 1981 – July 1984^{v} | 2 |
| 3 | (Guyana) Kenny Bristol | 29 July 1979 – 25 November 1981 | 1 |
| 2 | (United Kingdom) Maurice Hope | 20 April 1976 – June 1979^{v} | 0 |
| 1 | (Australia) Charkey Ramon | 30 October 1972 – April 1976^{v} | 1 |

== Middleweight ==
| No. | Name | Duration of reign | Defences |
|---|---|---|---|
| 61 | (United Kingdom) George Liddard | 17 October 2025 - present | 0 |
| 60 | (United Kingdom) Kieron Conway | 30 November 2024 - 17 October 2025 | 2 |
| 59 | (United Kingdom) Hamzah Sheeraz | 26 November 2022 - November 2024^{v} | 2 |
| 58 | (United Kingdom) Felix Cash | 2 February 2019 - 2021^{v} | 3 |
| 57 | (United Kingdom) Liam Cameron | 13 October 2017 – 2018 | 1 |
| 56 | (United Kingdom) Sam Sheedy | 28 April 2017 – 13 October 2017 | 0 |
| 55 | (United Kingdom) Tommy Langford | 12 March 2016 – 2016 | 0 |
| 54 | (United Kingdom) Billy Joe Saunders | 28 April 2012 – 2015 | 4 |
| 53 | (United Kingdom) Martin Murray | 16 July 2010 – 18 June 2011^{v} | 1 |
| 52 | (United Kingdom) Darren Barker | 14 November 2007 – 27 June 2010^{v} | 4 |
| 51 | (United Kingdom) Howard Eastman (2) | 20 April 2007 – 28 September 2007^{s} | 0 |
| 50 | (United Kingdom) Scott Dann | 10 February 2006 – March 2007^{v} | 0 |
| 49 | (Ghana) James Obede Toney | 3 July 2004 – January 2006^{v} | 0 |
| 48 | (United Kingdom) Howard Eastman (1) | 16 September 2000 – June 2004^{v} | 2 |
| 47 | (Australia) Sam Soliman | 19 June 2000 – 16 September 2000 | 0 |
| 46 | (Canada) Alain Bonnamie | 5 October 1999 – May 2000^{v} | 0 |
| 45 | (United Kingdom) Jason Matthews | 27 February 1999 – September 1999^{v} | 0 |
| 44 | (United Kingdom) Paul Jones | 24 March 1998 – 27 February 1999 | 0 |
| 43 | (Zimbabwe) Johnson Tshuma | 31 October 1997 – 24 March 1998 | 0 |
| 42 | (United Kingdom) Robert McCracken | 3 November 1995 – September 1997^{v} | 2 |
| 41 | (United Kingdom) Richie Woodhall | 26 March 1992 – October 1995^{v} | 4 |
| 40 | (United Kingdom) Michael Watson | 21 May 1989 – February 1992^{v} | 1 |
| 39 | (United Kingdom) Nigel Benn | 20 April 1988 – 21 May 1989 | 3 |
| 38 | (United Kingdom) Tony Sibson (2) | 27 November 1984 – 7 February 1988^{r} | 2 |
| 37 | (United Kingdom) Mark Kaylor | 14 September 1983 – 27 November 1984 | 0 |
| 36 | (Saint Kitts and Nevis) (United Kingdom) Roy Gumbs | 8 February 1983 – 14 September 1983 | 1 |
| 35 | (United Kingdom) Tony Sibson (1) | 4 March 1980 – January 1983^{v} | 0 |
| 34 | (Uganda) Ayub Kalule | 25 May 1978 – February 1980^{v} | 1 |
| 33 | (Fiji) Al Korovou | 17 March 1978 – 25 May 1978 | 0 |
| 32 | (Samoa) Monty Betham | 24 July 1975 – 17 March 1978 | 5 |
| 31 | (Australia) Tony Mundine | 14 April 1972 – June 1975^{v} | 4 |
| 30 | (Jamaica) (United Kingdom) Bunny Sterling | 8 September 1970 – 14 April 1972 | 3 |
| 29 | (United Kingdom) Mark Rowe | 12 May 1970 – 8 September 1970 | 0 |
| 28 | (United Kingdom) Les McAteer | 14 July 1969 – 12 May 1970 | 0 |
| 27 | (United Kingdom) Johnny Pritchett | 9 October 1967 – June 1969^{v} | 1 |
| 26 | (Jamaica) Milo Calhoun | 28 July 1967 – 9 October 1967 | 0 |
| 25 | (Canada) Blair Richardson | 26 Match 1966 – June 1967^{v} | 0 |
| 24 | (The Bahamas) Gomeo Brennan (2) | 12 November 1964 – 26 Match 1966 | 2 |
| 23 | (Samoa) Tuna Scanlan | 14 March 1964 – October 1964^{v} | 0 |
| 22 | (The Bahamas) Gomeo Brennan (1) | 22 October 1963 – 14 March 1964 | 0 |
| 21 | (Nigeria) Dick Tiger (2) | 30 November 1960 – September 1963^{v} | 0 |
| 20 | (Canada) Wilf Greaves | 22 June 1960 – 30 November 1960 | 0 |
| 19 | (United Kingdom) Terry Downes | 3 November 1959 – May 1960^{v} | 0 |
| 18 | (United Kingdom) John McCormack | 15 September 1959 – 3 November 1959 | 0 |
| 17 | (Nigeria) Dick Tiger (1) | 27 March 1958 – August 1959^{v} | 0 |
| 16 | (United Kingdom) Pat McAteer | 16 June 1955 – 27 March 1958 | 4 |
| 15 | (United Kingdom) Johnny Sullivan | 14 September 1954 – 16 June 1955 | 0 |
| 14 | (Australia) Al Bourke | 12 December 1952 – August 1954^{v} | 0 |
| 13 | (United Kingdom) Randolph Turpin | 21 October 1952 – November 1952^{v} | 0 |
| 12 | (Australia) Dave Sands | 6 September 1949 – September 1952^{v} | 1 |
| 11 | (United Kingdom) Dick Turpin | 18 May 1948 – 6 September 1949 | 2 |
| 10 | (New Zealand) Bos Murphy | 26 January 1948 – April 1948^{v} | 0 |
| 9 | (Australia) Ron Richards | 26 February 1940 – December 1947^{v} | 2 |
| 8 | (United Kingdom) Jock McAvoy | 10 April 1933 – January 1940^{v} | 4 |
| 7 | (United Kingdom) Len Harvey | 16 May 1929 – 10 April 1933 | 5 |
| 6 | (United Kingdom) Alexander Ireland | 14 March 1928 – 16 May 1929 | 1 |
| 5 | (United Kingdom) Frank Moody | 16 February 1927 – February 1928^{v} | 0 |
| 4 | (United Kingdom) Tommy Milligan | 12 July 1926 – January 1927^{v} | 2 |
| 3 | (United Kingdom) Len Johnson | 20 February 1926 – June 1926^{v} | 2 |
| 2 | (United Kingdom) Roland Todd | 15 February 1923 – 20 January 1926^{s} | 0 |
| 1 | (United Kingdom) Ted Lewis | 19 June 1922 – 15 February 1923 | 1 |

== Super-middleweight ==
| No. | Name | Duration of reign | Defences |
|---|---|---|---|
| 24 | (United Kingdom) Troy Williamson | 20 December 2025 – present | 0 |
| 23 | (United Kingdom) Callum Simpson | 3 August 2024 – 20 December 2025 | 2 |
| 22 | (United Kingdom) Zak Chelli | 20 January 2024 – 3 August 2024 | 0 |
| 21 | (United Kingdom) Jack Cullen | 2 September 2023 – 20 January 2024 | 0 |
| 20 | (United Kingdom) Mark Heffron | 16 July 2022 - 2 September 2023 | 0 |
| 19 | (United Kingdom) Lennox Clarke | 27 March 2021 – 16 July 2022 | 0 |
| 18 | (United Kingdom) Lerrone Richards | 27 April 2019 – November 2020^{v} | 1 |
| 17 | (United Kingdom) Rocky Fielding | 30 September 2017 | 0 |
| 16 | (United Kingdom) David Brophy | 17 March 2017 – 30 September 2017 | 0 |
| 15 | (Australia) Zac Dunn | 25 November 2016 – 17 March 2017 | 0 |
| 14 | (United Kingdom) Luke Blackledge | 4 April 2015 | 2 |
| 13 | (Nigeria) Isaac Ekpo | 28 June 2014 | 0 |
| 12 | (United Kingdom) Rocky Fielding | 21 September 2013 – 15 March 2014 | 1 |
| 11 | (United Kingdom) George Groves | 3 April 2010 – August 2013 | 4 |
| 10 | (Ghana) Charles Adamu (2) | 18 December 2009 – 3 April 2010 | 0 |
| 9 | (The Bahamas) Jermain Mackey | 17 July 2008 – 26 October 2009^{s} | 0 |
| 8 | (United Kingdom) Carl Froch | 12 March 2004 – 9 November 2007^{v} | 7 |
| 7 | (Ghana) Charles Adamu (1) | 1 August 2003 – 12 March 2004 | 0 |
| 6 | (South Africa) Andre Thysse | 1 March 2003 – 21 June 2004^{v} | 0 |
| 5 | (United Kingdom) David Starie | 28 March 1998 – 1 March 2003 | 6 |
| 4 | (United Kingdom) Clinton Woods | 6 December 1997 – 28 March 1998 | 0 |
| 3 | (United Kingdom) Henry Wharton | 27 June 1991 – 3 May 1997^{v} | 5 |
| 2 | (Australia) Lou Cafaro | 27 July 1990 – 23 January 1991^{s} | 0 |
| 1 | (Australia) Rod Carr | 8 October 1989 – 27 July 1990 | 0 |

== Light-heavyweight ==
| No. | Name | Duration of reign | Defences |
|---|---|---|---|
| 43 | (United Kingdom) Joshua Buatsi | 3 February 2024 - present | 0 |
| 42 | (United Kingdom) Dan Azeez | 17 December 2022 - 3 February 2024 | 0 |
| 41 | (United Kingdom) Anthony Yarde | 4 December 2021^{v} | 0 |
| 40 | (United Kingdom) Lyndon Arthur | 12 October 2019 – 4 December 2021 | 2 |
| 39 | (United Kingdom) Callum Johnson | 24 September 2016 – 9 March 2019 | 1 |
| 38 | (United Kingdom) Bob Ajisafe | 13 June 2015 | 0 |
| 37 | (United Kingdom) Enzo Maccarinelli | 17 August 2013 – 5 April 2014 | 0 |
| 36 | (Jamaica) (United Kingdom) Ovill McKenzie (2) | 11 November 2011 – 6 May 2013 | 2 |
| 35 | (United Kingdom) Tony Bellew | 12 March 2010 – 16 July 2011 | 3 |
| 34 | (United Kingdom) Nathan Cleverly | 10 October 2009 – 10 March 2010^{v} | 5 |
| 33 | (United Kingdom) Dean Francis | 9 February 2007 – 1 October 2008^{v} | 2 |
| 32 | (Jamaica) (United Kingdom) Ovill McKenzie (1) | 24 September 2006 – 9 February 2007 | 0 |
| 32 | (Nigeria) (United Kingdom) Peter Oboh | 6 September 2002 – August 2006^{v} | 2 |
| 30 | (United Kingdom) Tony Oakey | 8 May 2001 – August 2002^{v} | 1 |
| 29 | (United Kingdom) Neil Simpson | 2 January 2001 – April 2001^{v} | 0 |
| 28 | (United Kingdom) Clinton Woods | 13 March 1999 – December 2000^{v} | 2 |
| 27 | (United Kingdom) Crawford Ashley (2) | 9 June 1998 – 13 March 1999 | 0 |
| 26 | (United Kingdom) Nicky Piper | 30 September 1995 – May 1998^{v} | 1 |
| 25 | (United Kingdom) Noel Magee | 9 May 1995 – 30 September 1995 | 0 |
| 24 | (United Kingdom) Crawford Ashley (1) | 19 November 1994 – April 1995^{v} | 0 |
| 23 | (United Kingdom) Garry Delaney | 30 September 1994 – October 1994^{v} | 0 |
| 22 | (Canada) Brent Kosolofski | 7 April 1993 – August 1994^{v} | 0 |
| 21 | (Australia) Guy Waters | 21 April 1989 – March 1993^{v} | 3 |
| 20 | (Canada) Willie Featherstone | 12 September 1987 – 21 April 1989 | 2 |
| 19 | (Trinidad and Tobago) Leslie Stewart | 4 August 1985 – 23 May 1987^{v} | 1 |
| 18 | (Zambia) Lottie Mwale | 31 March 1979 – 4 August 1985 | 5 |
| 17 | (Canada) Gary Summerhays | 27 February 1978 – 31 March 1979 | 0 |
| 16 | (Australia) Tony Mundine | 30 October 1975 – 27 February 1978 | 4 |
| 15 | (Australia) Steve Aczel | 19 February 1975 – 30 October 1975 | 0 |
| 14 | (United Kingdom) John Conteh | 22 March 1973 – January 1975^{v} | 2 |
| 13 | (United Kingdom) Chris Finnegan | 24 January 1971 – 22 March 1973 | 1 |
| 12 | (United Kingdom) Eddie Avoth | 23 October 1970 – 24 January 1971 | 0 |
| 11 | (Australia) Bob Dunlop | 12 February 1968 – September 1970^{v} | 1 |
| 10 | (United Kingdom) Chic Calderwood | 9 June 1960 – 12 November 1966^{v} | 3 |
| 9 | (South Africa) Mike Holt and (Tonga) (New Zealand) Johnny Halafihi | 25 April 1960 (Tie/Draw for vacant title) | 0 |
| 8 | (Canada) Yvon Durelle | 30 May 1957 – March 1960^{v} | 1 |
| 7 | (Canada) Gordon Wallace | 19 June 1956 – 30 May 1957 | 0 |
| 6 | (United Kingdom) Randolph Turpin | 10 June 1952 – May 1956 | 1 |
| 5 | (United Kingdom) Freddie Mills | 20 June 1942 – May 1952^{v} | 0 |
| 4 | (United Kingdom) Len Harvey | 10 July 1939 – 20 June 1942 | 0 |
| 3 | (United Kingdom) Gipsy Billy Daniels | 25 April 1927 – June 1939^{v} | 0 |
| 2 | (United Kingdom) Tom Berry | 31 January 1927 – 25 April 1927 | 0 |
| 1 | (United Kingdom) Jack Bloomfield | 26 March 1923 – December 1926^{v} | 1 |

== Cruiserweight ==
| No. | Name | Duration of reign | Defences |
|---|---|---|---|
| 28 | (United Kingdom) Pat Brown | 19 September 2026 – present | 0 |
| 27 | (United Kingdom) Aloys Youmbi | 24 May 2025 – 2026^{v} | 0 |
| 26 | (United Kingdom) Jack Massey | 15 June 2024 – 12 October 2024^{v} | 0 |
| 25 | (United Kingdom) Isaac Chamberlain | 21 October 2023 – 15 June 2024 | 0 |
| 24 | (United Kingdom) Chris Billam-Smith | 23 November 2019 – 27 May 2023^{v} | 4 |
| 23 | (United Kingdom) Lawrence Okolie | 23 March 2019 – 2019^{v} | 0 |
| 22 | (United Kingdom) Wadi Camacho | 17 November 2018 – 23 March 2019 | 0 |
| 21 | (United Kingdom) Lawrence Okolie | 6 June 2018 – 2 August 2018^{v} | 0 |
| 20 | (United Kingdom) Luke Watkins | 7 October 2017 – 6 June 2018 | 1 |
| 19 | (Canada) Denton Daley | 9 September 2016^{v} | 0 |
| 18 | (United Kingdom) Ovill McKenzie | 12 April 2014 – 1 August 2016 | 2 |
| 17 | (United Kingdom) Tony Conquest | 22 February 2014 – 12 April 2014 | 0 |
| 16 | (New Zealand) Shane Cameron | 20 July 2011^{v} | 0 |
| 15 | (Australia) Dominic Vea | 1 July 2010 – 20 July 2011 | 0 |
| 14 | (United Kingdom) Robert Norton | 6 February 2009 – 9 June 2010^{v} | 1 |
| 13 | (Canada) Troy Ross | 19 March 2007 – 19 November 2008^{s} | 0 |
| 12 | (United Kingdom) Mark Hobson | 25 January 2003 – 8 September 2006^{v} | 5 |
| 11 | (United Kingdom) Bruce Scott (2) | 10 March 2001 – 30 August 2002^{s} | 0 |
| 10 | (Australia) Adam Watt | 24 June 2000 – 7 October 2000^{v} | 0 |
| 9 | (United Kingdom) Bruce Scott (1) | 28 November 1998 – 15 May 1999^{v} | 0 |
| 8 | (United Kingdom) Darren Corbett | 2 June 1997 – 28 November 1998 | 1 |
| 7 | (United Kingdom) Chris Okoh | 29 September 1995 – 2 June 1997 | 3 |
| 6 | (Uganda) Franco Wanyama | 28 January 1994 – 29 September 1995 | 0 |
| 5 | (United Kingdom) Derek Angol | 30 November 1989 – 25 July 1992^{v} | 4 |
| 4 | (Samoa) Apollo Sweet | 24 May 1989 – 30 November 1989 | 1 |
| 3 | (United Kingdom) Glenn McCrory | 4 September 1987 – 19 April 1989^{v} | 2 |
| 2 | (Zambia) Chisanda Mutti | 1 December 1984 – 4 September 1987 | 1 |
| 1 | (United Kingdom) Stewart Lithgo | 14 May 1984 – 1 December 1984 | 0 |

== Heavyweight ==
| No. | Name | Duration of reign | Defences |
|---|---|---|---|
| 54 | (United Kingdom) Moses Itauma | 16 August 2025 — present | 0 |
| 53 | (United Kingdom) Fabio Wardley | 28 October 2023 – 7 June 2025^{v} | 2 |
| 52 | (United Kingdom) Joe Joyce | 28 November 2020 – March 2023^{v} | 1 |
| 51 | (United Kingdom) Daniel Dubois | 27 September 2019 – 28 November 2020 | 0 |
| 50 | (United Kingdom) Joe Joyce | 5 May 2018 – 11 August 2019^{v} | 1 |
| 49 | (Jamaica) Lenroy Thomas | 27 May 2017 – 5 May 2018 | 1 |
| 48 | (United Kingdom) Anthony Joshua | 12 September 2015 – 9 April 2016^{v} | 1 |
| 47 | (Australia) Lucas Browne | 26 April 2014 – 12 September 2015^{v} | 0 |
| 46 | (United Kingdom) David Price | 19 May 2012 – 5 December 2013^{v} | 2 |
| 45 | (United Kingdom) Tyson Fury | 23 July 2011 – 8 February 2012^{v} | 1 |
| 44 | (United Kingdom) Derek Chisora | 18 September 2010 – 23 July 2011 | 0 |
| 43 | (United Kingdom) Sam Sexton | 15 May 2009 – 18 September 2010 | 1 |
| 42 | (United Kingdom) Martin Rogan | 28 February 2009 – 15 May 2009 | 0 |
| 41 | (United Kingdom) Matt Skelton (2) | 28 July 2006 – 28 February 2009 | 1 |
| 40 | (United Kingdom) Danny Williams (2) | 10 December 2005 – 28 July 2006 | 1 |
| 39 | (United Kingdom) Matt Skelton (1) | 24 April 2004 – 25 February 2005^{v} | 2 |
| 38 | (United Kingdom) Michael Sprott | 24 January 2004 – 24 April 2004 | 0 |
| 37 | (United Kingdom) Danny Williams (1) | 18 December 1999 – 24 January 2004 | 7 |
| 36 | (United Kingdom) Julius Francis | 30 June 1997 – 30 November 1999^{v} | 4 |
| 35 | (United Kingdom) Scott Welch | 27 October 1995 – 1 June 1996^{s} | 0 |
| 34 | (United Kingdom) Henry Akinwande | 18 March 1993 – 30 January 1994^{s} | 0 |
| 33 | (United Kingdom) (Canada) Lennox Lewis | 30 April 1992 – 1 February 1993^{v} | 1 |
| 33 | (United Kingdom) Derek Williams | 29 November 1988 – 30 April 1992 | 2 |
| 32 | (United Kingdom) Horace Notice | 12 April 1986 – 1988 | 5 |
| 31 | (Jamaica) (Canada) Trevor Berbick | 21 July 1981 – 1985^{s} | 3 |
| 30 | (United Kingdom) John Lewis Gardner | 24 October 1978 – June 1981^{v} | 1 |
| 29 | (United Kingdom) (Australia) Joe Bugner (2) | 12 October 1976 – September 1978^{v} | 0 |
| 28 | (United Kingdom) Richard Dunn | 30 September 1975 – 12 October 1976 | 1 |
| 27 | (Jamaica) (United Kingdom) Bunny Johnson | 13 January 1975 – 30 September 1975 | 0 |
| 26 | (United Kingdom) Danny McAlinden | 27 June 1972 – 13 January 1975 | 0 |
| 25 | (United Kingdom) Jack Bodell | 27 September 1971 – 27 June 1972 | 0 |
| 24 | (United Kingdom) (Australia) Joe Bugner (1) | 16 March 1971 – 27 September 1971 | 0 |
| 23 | (United Kingdom) Henry Cooper | 12 January 1959 – 16 March 1971 | 10 |
| 22 | (United Kingdom) Brian London | 3 June 1958 – 12 January 1959 | 0 |
| 21 | (United Kingdom) Joe Erskine | 17 September 1957 – 3 June 1958 | 1 |
| 20 | (Jamaica) Joe Bygraves | 26 June 1956 – August 1957^{v} | 2 |
| 19 | (United Kingdom) Don Cockell | 12 May 1953 – May 1956^{v} | 1 |
| 18 | (United Kingdom) Johnny Williams | 11 March 1952 – 12 May 1953 | 1 |
| 17 | (United Kingdom) Jack Gardner | 14 November 1950 – 11 March 1952 | 0 |
| 16 | (United Kingdom) Bruce Woodcock | 17 July 1945 – 14 November 1950 | 2 |
| 15 | (United Kingdom) Jack London | 15 September 1944 – 17 July 1945 | 0 |
| 14 | (United Kingdom) Len Harvey (2) | 16 March 1939 – August 1944^{v} | 0 |
| 13 | (United Kingdom) Tommy Farr | 15 March 1937 – February 1939^{v} | 0 |
| 12 | (South Africa) Ben Foord | 17 August 1936 – 15 March 1937 | 0 |
| 11 | (United Kingdom) Jack Petersen | 4 June 1934 – 17 August 1936 | 4 |
| 10 | (United Kingdom) Len Harvey (1) | 8 February 1934 – 4 June 1934 | 0 |
| 9 | (Canada) Larry Gains | 13 June 1931 – 8 February 1934 | 3 |
| 8 | (United Kingdom) Phil Scott | 22 September 1924 – 13 June 1931 | 2 |
| 7 | (United Kingdom) Joe Beckett | 27 February 1919 – August 1924 | 2 |
| 6 | (United Kingdom) Bombardier Billy Wells (2) | 6 December 1912 – 27 February 1919 | 2 |
| 5 | (South Africa) Fred Storbeck | 12 January 1912 – November 1912^{v} | 0 |
| 4 | (United Kingdom) Bombardier Billy Wells (1) | 18 December 1911 – December 1911^{v} | 0 |
| 3 | (United Kingdom) Matthew Curran | 18 January 1911 – November 1911^{v} | 3 |
| 2 | (Canada) Tommy Burns | 11 April 1910 – December 1910^{v} | 0 |
| 1 | (Australia) Peter Jackson | 30 May 1892 – March 1910^{v} | 2 |

== See also ==
- British Boxing Board of Control
- Commonwealth Boxing Council
- List of Commonwealth Boxing Council female champions
- List of IBF world champions
- List of WBA world champions
- List of WBC world champions
- List of WBO world champions
- World Boxing Council
