= Tshuma =

Tshuma is a Zimbabwean surname. Notable people with the surname include:

- Charlton Tshuma (born 1993), Zimbabwean cricketer
- Johnson Tshuma (born 1970), Zimbabwean boxer
- Loreen Tshuma, (born 1996), Zimbabwean cricketer
- Novuyo Tshuma (born 1988), Zimbabwean writer and professor of creative writing
- Nthokozo Tshuma (born 1985), retired Zimbabwean football midfielder
- Petronella Tshuma (born 1990), Zimbabwean-born actress
- Schillo Tshuma (born 1992), Zimbabwean footballer
