= Lawrence Austin =

Australian boxer (born 1955)

Personal information
- Nickname: Baby Casius
- Nationality: Australian
- Born: January 17, 1955 Warrnambool, Victoria
- Died: 9 January 2025 (aged 69) Melbourne, Victoria
- Height: 5 ft 9 in (175 cm)
- Weight: super feather/light/light welter/welter/light middle/middleweight

Boxing career
- Stance: Orthodox

Boxing record
- Total fights: 295
- Wins: 283(KO 12)
- Losses: 12 (KO 0)
- Draws: 2

Lawrence "Baby Casius" Austin (born 17 January 1955 in Warrnambool) is an Australian Aboriginal professional super feather/light/light welter/welter/light middle/middleweight boxer of the 1970s and '80s who won the West Australia State welterweight title, West Australia State light middleweight title, Victoria State light middleweight title, Australian lightweight title, Australian light welterweight title, Australian welterweight title, South Seas Light Middleweight Title, and Commonwealth light welterweight title (twice), and was a challenger for the Australian light middleweight title against Russell Sands, and Commonwealth light welterweight title against Jeff Malcolm, his professional fighting weight varied from 128 lb (58 kg; 9 st 2 lb), i.e. super featherweight to 159 lb (72 kg; 11 st 5 lb), i.e. middleweight. He was inducted into the Australian National Boxing Hall of Fame in 2008.
