= Mick O'Malley =

Australian boxer

Personal information
- Nationality: Australian
- Born: 20 November 1972 (age 53) Australia
- Weight: feather/super feather/lightweight

Boxing career
- Stance: Orthodox

Boxing record
- Total fights: 19
- Wins: 15 (KO 7)
- Losses: 3 (KO 3)
- Draws: 1

Mick O'Malley (born 20 November 1972) is an Australian professional feather/super feather/lightweight boxer of the 1990s and 2000s who won the Queensland (Australia) State super featherweight title, Australian featherweight title, Australian super featherweight title, and Commonwealth super featherweight title, and was a challenger for the Commonwealth super featherweight title against Alex Moon, his professional fighting weight varied from 125 3/4 lb (57.0 kg; 8 st 13.8 lb), i.e. featherweight to 135 lb (61 kg; 9 st 9 lb), i.e. lightweight.
