= Manny Santos (boxer) =

Tongan / New Zealand boxer

Personal information
- Nationality: Tongan/New Zealander
- Born: Manoel Santos; 11 October 1940 Tonga
- Died: 2 December 2013 (aged 73) Auckland, New Zealand
- Height: 5 ft 8 in (1.73 m)
- Weight: light/light welterweight

Boxing career
- Stance: Orthodox

Boxing record
- Total fights: 44
- Wins: 32 (KO 14)
- Losses: 9 (KO 1)
- Draws: 3

Manoel "Manny" Santos (11 October 1940 – 2 December 2013) was a Tongan-born New Zealand professional light/light welterweight boxer of the 1960s and 1970s.

== Early life and family ==
Santos was born in Tonga on 11 October 1940. His father, also called Manoel Santos, had a Portuguese father and a Tongan mother, and served with the Māori Battalion during World War II. Santos Snr and his family emigrated from Tonga to Auckland, New Zealand, in 1957.

== Boxing career ==
Santos won the New Zealand Boxing Association lightweight title, the Australasian Light welterweight title, and the British Commonwealth lightweight title. He was a challenger for the Australasian lightweight title against Hector Thompson. His professional fighting weight varied from 133 1/4 lb (60.4 kg; 9 st 7.3 lb), i.e. lightweight, to 138 1/4 lb (62.7 kg; 9 st 12.3 lb), i.e. light welterweight.

== Death ==
Santos died in Auckland on 2 December 2013, and was buried at Manukau Memorial Gardens.
