= Leo Young =

Leo Young may refer to:

- Gus Young (footballer) (Leo Young, 1915–1941), Australian rules footballer
- Leo Young (boxer) (born 1969), Australian boxer
- Leo C. Young (1891–1981), American radio engineer
- Emilio Young (born 2005), known as Leo, American distance runner
