= Vetch Field =

Former football stadium in Swansea, Wales, United Kingdom

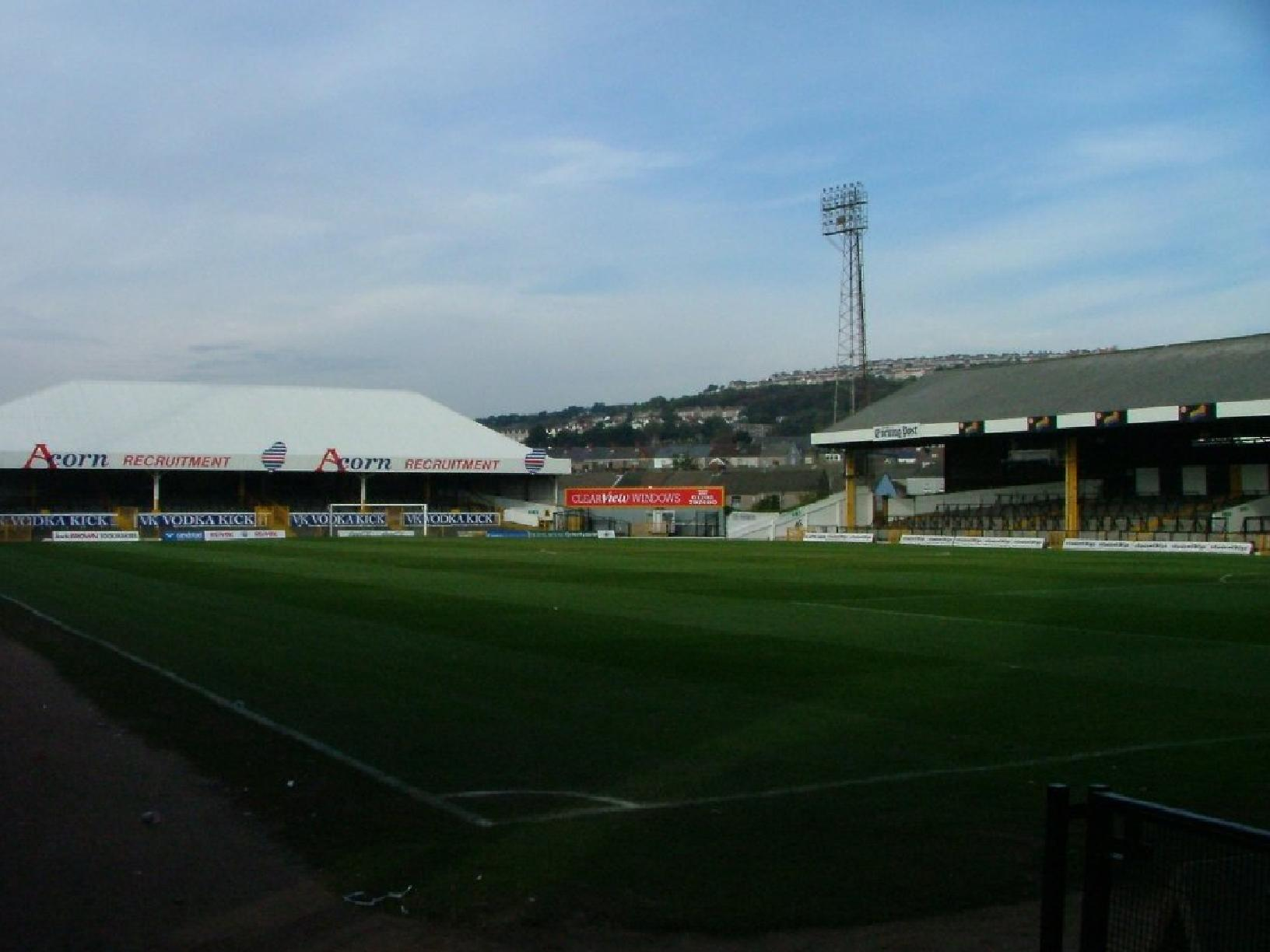
- The Vetch Field in 2006
- Interactive map of Vetch Field
- Location: Glamorgan Street, Swansea, Wales
- Coordinates: 51°36′59″N 3°57′0″W
- Owner: Swansea City A.F.C.
- Capacity: 11,475 (at closure)
- Surface: Grass
- Record attendance: 32,796 (Swansea vs Arsenal, 17 February 1968)
- Field size: 101 by 64 metres (110 by 70 yards)
- Acreage: 5.3 acres

Construction
- Opened: 1912
- Renovated: Numerous Times
- Closed: 11th May 2005
- Demolished: 23rd February 2011

Tenant
- Swansea City A.F.C. (1912–2005)

The Vetch Field was a football stadium in Swansea, Wales, and was the home ground of Swansea City A.F.C. from the club’s founding until its closure in 2005. Opened in 1912, the ground held upwards of 30,000 at its peak, with this reduced to around 12,000 at the time of closure. Following its closure, the club relocated to a newly constructed stadium named the Liberty Stadium (known as the Swansea.com Stadium since 2021).

As well as being home to the Swans, the Vetch also hosted games for the Wales national football team, with 18 internationals played at the Vetch between 1921 and 1988. Other sports also found a home at the Vetch, with 8 rugby league matches played there between 1990 and 1999. In 1960, local boy Brian Curvis beat the Australian boxer George Barnes at the Vetch to win the Commonwealth (British Empire) Welterweight title.

The stadium also operated as a music venue, hosting The Who in 1976 and Stevie Wonder in 1984.

The Vetch's final Football League fixture was a 1–0 win for Swansea over Shrewsbury Town on 30 April 2005. The last game of football to be held at the Vetch was the 2005 FAW Premier Cup final, which saw Swansea beat Wrexham 2–1.

The Vetch continues to be the subject of much nostalgia amongst some Swansea fans, who often feel that it had a more vibrant and authentic atmosphere than the Swansea.com Stadium.

== History ==
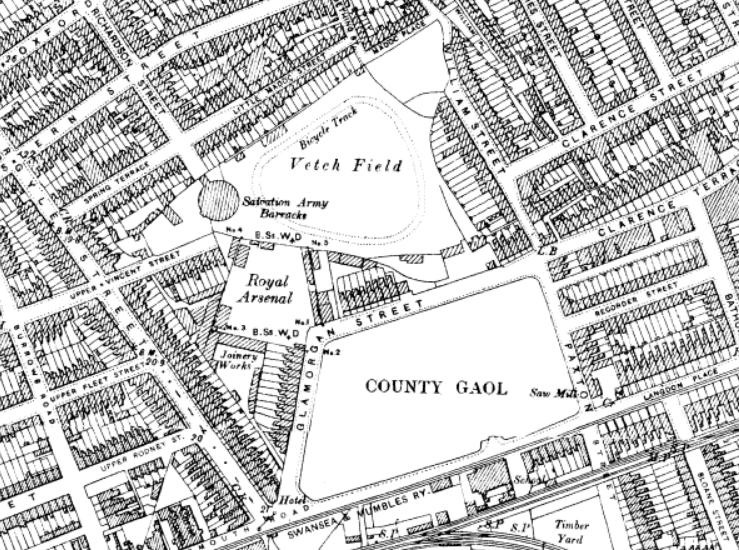
An Ordnance Survey map from 1899 showing the 'Vetch Field' site.

Named due to the vetch (a type of legume – not a cabbage as popularly misbelieved in most of south Wales) that was grown on its surface at the time, the site was owned by Swansea Gaslight Company in 1912, when a professional football team was formed in the town. The site was in a good location and deemed surplus to requirements at the Gas Company, so the club moved in. Originally, the surface was made of compacted coal cinder and players had to wear knee pads for the first season of football there. Having seen many changes during its 93 years (detailed below), the Vetch took its final bow with an FAW Premier Cup Final against Wrexham. After the game, the seats, turf, advertising hoardings and anything else fans could get their hands on were removed from the ground, and is currently in the process of being demolished as the council seek permission to build on the land there, the entrances have been boarded up and the turf of the pitch has been taken up. The 2004–05 season was the first time in 93 years that the Vetch had the highest average attendance in its division.

On 30 April 2005, Adrian Forbes scored the last league goal at the Vetch in Swansea's 1–0 win over Shrewsbury Town. The player who scored the final goal at the Vetch was Andy Robinson, who scored the winner in a 2–1 victory over Wrexham.

== Stands ==
=== The Centre (South) Stand ===
Originally built in 1912 to house 1,500 spectators, the Centre Stand went through numerous changes before ending up as a stand that ran only 3/4 the length of the pitch, with a family stand at one end, and some wooden bench seating at the other. It was suggested that the gable and clock be moved to the Liberty Stadium, however as yet nothing has transpired.

=== The West Terrace ===
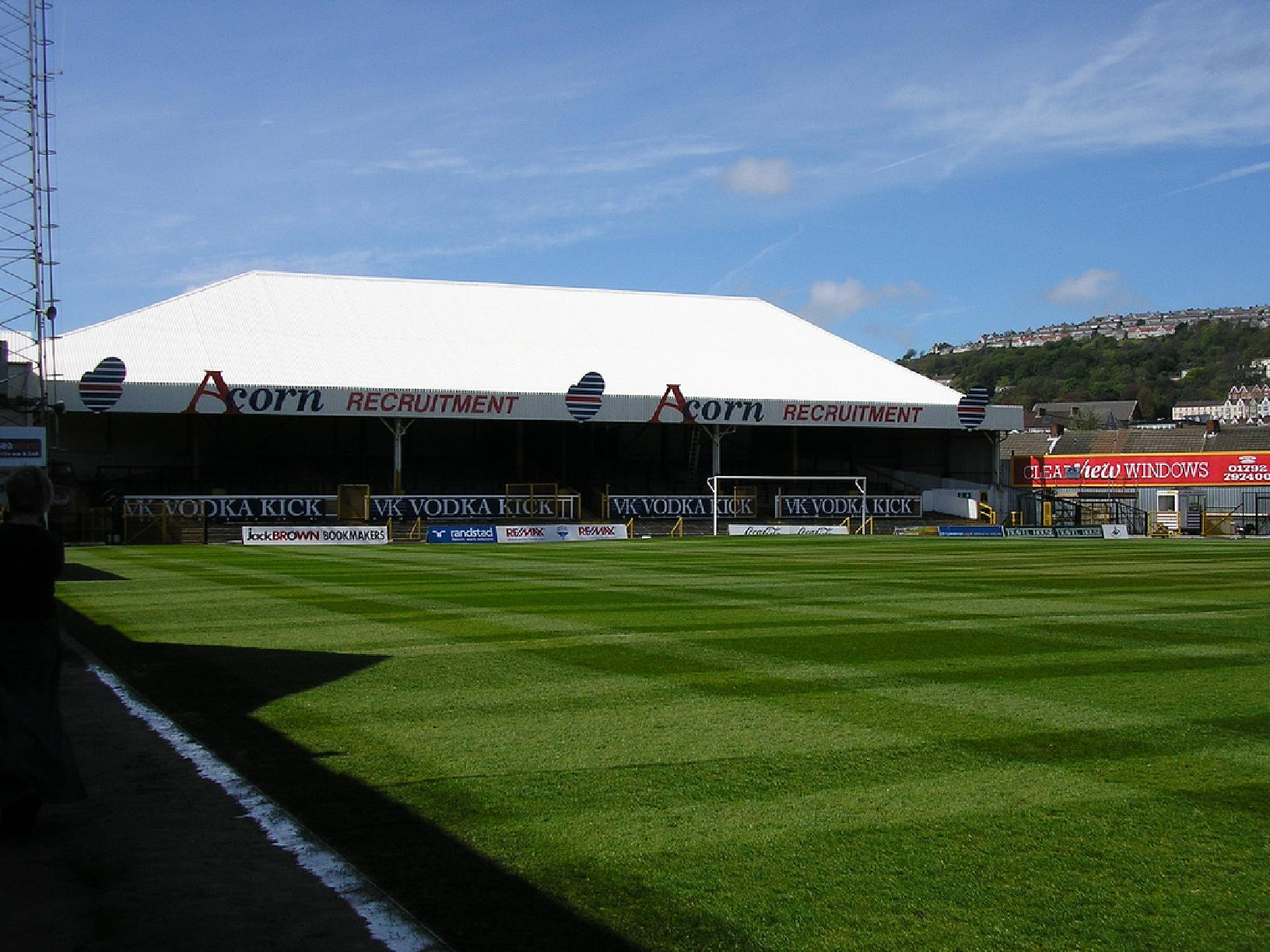
The West Terrace

Also the 'Away' stand, it was a single tier terrace and held about 2,000. It was originally a double-decker stand, with seating above the remaining terrace, however the upper tier was first closed and then built over during the late 1980s, and early 1990s amid growing safety concerns. The stairs to the upper tier are still visible from the lower. In 2005, the stand was split to accommodate both home and away fans. The stadium had a fairly unusual feature only found at Wembley as well, which was an underpass that allowed pedestrians to walk under the pitch.

=== The North Bank ===
Originally just a mound of earth with some concrete and railway sleepers on top of it, the 'big bank' grew to be the largest area of the ground. During the late 1950s the supporters' trust paid for a roof to be installed, and during the 1970s, and 1980s the Bank became home to the majority of supporters, and the most vocal. Safety concerns reduced its capacity by blocking off a large section at the rear, and following the Hillsborough disaster its safety certificate was again cut, and by the early 21st century it held around 3,500 due to concerns about the front not being covered. The number it could safely hold was increased towards the end of its life, ensuring that the North Bank was filled to capacity for the majority of matches during the final season.

=== The East Stand ===
The East Terrace was originally another mound of earth with some railway sleepers, and remained so until the late 1970s, when the club began its rise through the divisions. It became the first area of the ground to be redeveloped, and half the length of the pitch at the 'Town' end of the ground became home to the East Stand. A small layer of steep terracing lay beneath a stand with a capacity of around 2,500. It was also home to one of the most bizarre floodlights in the league, jutting out over the stand, completely out of character with the rest of the ground. Due to the refusal of residents of William Street behind the stand it could not be extended further, and financial problems ensured that it was the only part of the ground to be redeveloped, although further developments were initially planned.

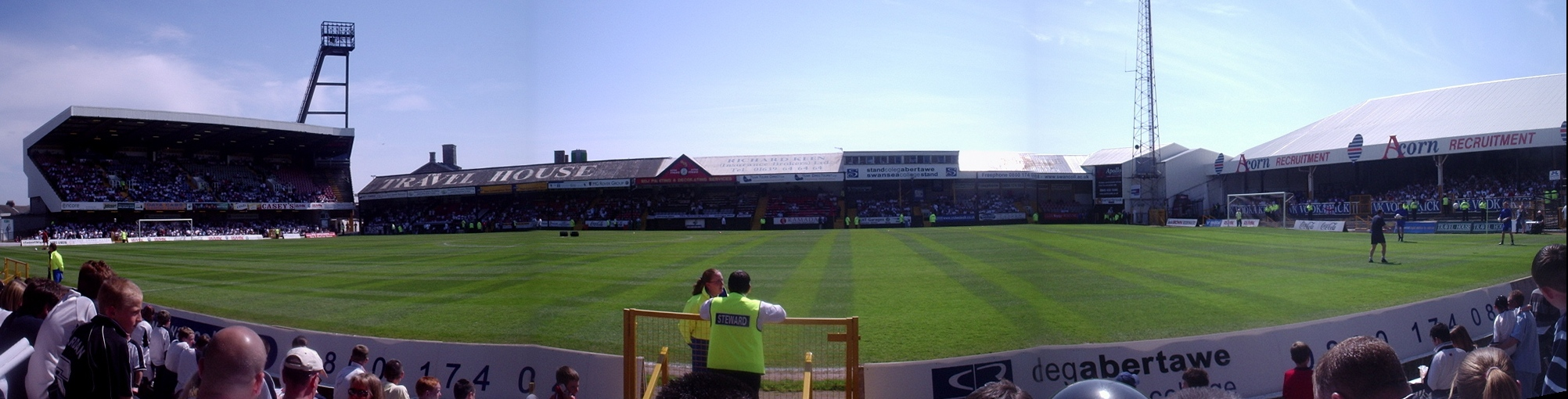
The Vetch prior to the kick-off of the last league match to be played at the ground, the penultimate fixture of the 2004–05 season. Swansea beat Shrewsbury Town 1–0 courtesy of an early Adrian Forbes strike.

== Redevelopment ==
On 23 May 2009, the ground was put onto the market after being replaced by the Liberty Stadium almost four years earlier.

Plans were originally made to build a community centre and housing development on the Vetch Field site but had not been put through. This included a 120-unit housing development and a play area. The housing development would include two, three and four-storey homes. The streets would also be organised into safe but accessible "home zones" inspired by communities in the Netherlands where vehicle speeds would be restricted. Parts of the Vetch Field could also be included in the overall development in a public display, planned for what was the centre spot of the old stadium.

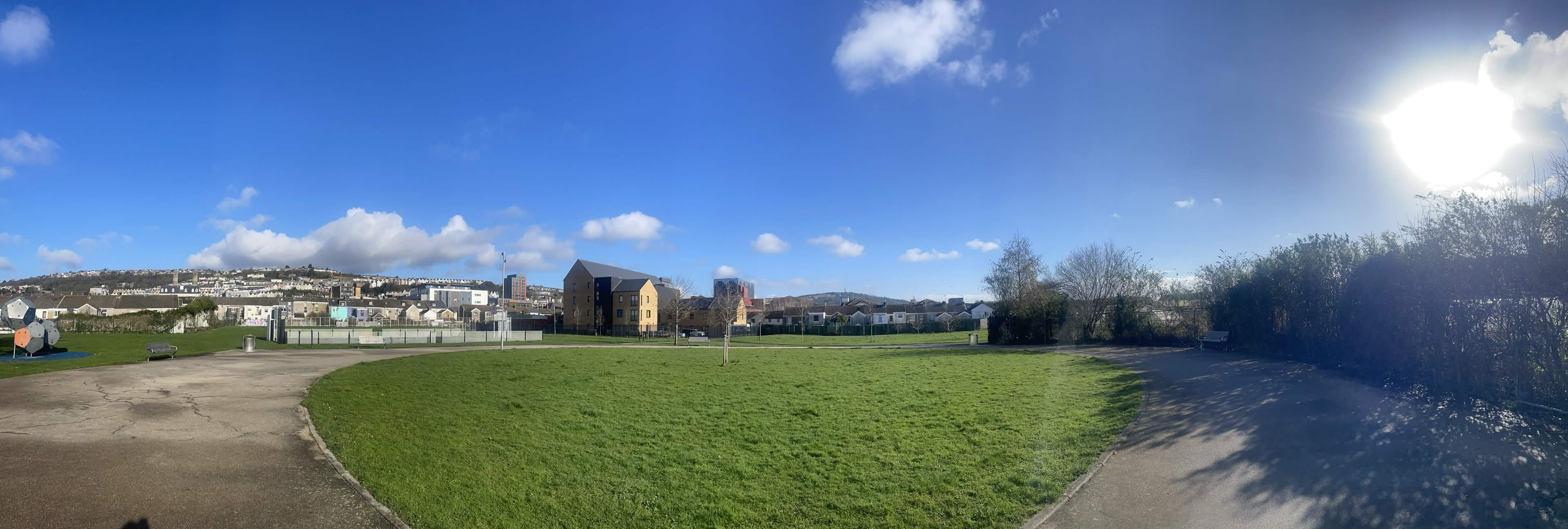
The Vetch Field site as of March 2026

Swansea Council also hoped tenders would be received for the development works by autumn 2009 and a preferred developer to be chosen by the start of the following year. Meanwhile, items of memorabilia at the Vetch Field, such as the stadium clock, have been transferred to Swansea Museum.

=== Demolition ===
Demolition work on the ground began on 31 January 2011. The work was predicted to last four to six months. Once demolition began the North Bank was the first stand to be pulled down.

Initially there was some controversy as to the whereabouts of the centre stand's clock – on arrival, the contractors noticed it was missing. It was later confirmed in the South Wales Evening Post that it was in the safe hands of a group of people angered by the council's neglect of such Vetch relics as the clock.

As of May 2011 no full stands remain and all the floodlights have been removed, including the East Stand's floodlight.

=== Proposals ===
In August 2011 it was confirmed by Swansea Council that the Vetch would be used temporarily for allotments coordinated by local artist Owen Griffiths on the historic site of the Vetch Field, in collaboration with the local residents.

The centre circle, however, was to remain, as this is where people's ashes have been spread.

=== Interim uses of the site ===
In May 2011 Swansea City A.F.C. held a bus parade for winning promotion to the Premier League, with the start of the parade being marked as the Vetch Field.

=== Present site ===
The site today is an open green space with a children's playground and a multi-use court. A section of the site features a community allotment as proposed, however, this is now permanent rather than temporary.

Additionally, the site preserves the old centre circle which is now marked by a circular concrete pavement.

== Other uses ==
=== Wales national football team ===
The venue hosted eighteen Wales internationals. The results were as follows;

Date	Type	Opponents	Final score
9 April 1921	1921 British Home Championship	Ireland	2–1
28 February 1925	1925 British Home Championship	England	1–2
17 November 1928	1929 British Home Championship	England	2–3
19 March 1952	1952 British Home Championship	Northern Ireland	3–0
15 April 1964	1964 British Home Championship	Northern Ireland	2–3
25 April 1970	1970 British Home Championship	Northern Ireland	1–0
21 April 1971	UEFA Euro 1972 qualifying	Czechoslovakia	1–3
13 October 1971	UEFA Euro 1972 qualifying	Finland	3–0
20 November 1974	UEFA Euro 1976 qualifying	Luxembourg	5–0
14 May 1976	1976 British Home Championship	Northern Ireland	1–0
11 September 1979	Friendly	Republic of Ireland	2–1
16 May 1981	1981 British Home Championship	Scotland	2–0
14 October 1981	World Cup Qualifier	Iceland	2–2
22 September 1982	UEFA Euro 1984 qualifying Group 4	Norway	1–0
22 May 1984	1984 British Home Championship	Northern Ireland	1–1
18 February 1987	Friendly	Soviet Union	0–0
23 March 1988	Friendly	Yugoslavia	1–2
19 October 1988	World Cup Qualifier	Finland	2–2

Wales' record at the Vetch is as follows:

Competition	P	W	D	L	F	A	Win %
World Cup Qualifiers	2	0	2	0	4	4	0%
UEFA European Championship	4	3	0	1	10	3	75%
British Home Championship	9	5	1	3	15	10	56%
Friendly matches	3	1	1	1	3	3	33%
Total	18	9	4	5	32	20	50%

=== Rugby League venue ===
On 19 August 1990 it hosted a Rugby League Charity Shield between Widnes and Wigan with Widnes winning 24 – 8.

The venue hosted six Wales internationals. The results were as follows;

Date	Type	Opponent	Final score
17 October 1991	Friendly	Papua New Guinea	68–0
22 March 1992	Friendly	France	35–6
27 November 1992	Friendly	England	11–36
4 October 1993	Friendly	New Zealand	19–24
15 October 1995	World Cup	Western Samoa	22–10
15 October 1999	Triangular Series 1999	Ireland	17–24

On 26 July 1998 it hosted a Super League III match between St. Helens and Wigan Warriors with Wigan winning 36 – 2.

== Records ==
A graph of Swansea City's league attendances at the Vetch Field from 1920 to 2005.

The highest attendance recorded at the Vetch Field was 32,796 for a fourth Round FA Cup match between Swansea Town and Arsenal FC on 17 February 1968. The highest recorded attendance for a league match at the Vetch Field was 29,447 in a game against Leeds United on 1 October 1955. The lowest recorded attendance for a league match at the Vetch Field was 1,311 in a match against Brentford on 26 April 1976.

The greatest total attendance at the Vetch was 469,814 - which occurred in the 1948–49 season when Swansea Town maintained an undefeated home league record (20 wins, 1 draw and 0 defeats) and became Champions of the Football League Third Division (South).

Pre-War, Swansea's highest average attendance was 16,118 during the season 1925–26. Post-War, Swansea's highest average attendance was 22,535 during the 1948–49 season. The lowest average attendance at the Vetch came in the 1974–75 season, when an average of 2,052 spectators watched each game. The average attendance for that last season at the Vetch was 8,457.

The first floodlit match at the Vetch came in a 'Friendly' against Hibernian FC in 1960–61. The last floodlit match occurred against Oxford United on 15 April 2005.

The first league match at the Vetch was against Cardiff City on 7 September 1912. The last league match at the Vetch was against Shrewsbury Town on 30 April 2005. The first Cup game at the Vetch was a Welsh Cup match against Milford on 31 October 1912. The last Cup game at the Vetch was a FAW Premier Cup Final against Wrexham.

== See also ==
- Liberty Stadium
