= Charles Shepherd (boxer) =

English boxer

Charles "The Bull" Shepherd (also known as Charlie) is the former British, Commonwealth and World Super featherweight boxing champion.

Born in Burnley, Lancashire on 28 June 1970, Shepherd began boxing at the age of twelve, becoming a British ABA champion aged 15.

== Early career ==
Shepherd moved to Carlisle when he was sixteen and made a winning professional debut in 1991 against Chris Aston, and soon moved himself into a championship position by winning a series of bouts in his opponents backyard including against amateur star George Naylor in Liverpool, Southern Area Lightweight Champion Cham Joof in London, Midlands Area Lightweight Champion Karl Taylor and future WBO Light- Welterweight world title challenger Nigel Wenton.

However 1994 proved to be a bad year for Shepherd first losing to the Commonwealth Champion Justin Juuko, and then dropping a hometown decision to Tony Foster for the Central Area title.

Nevertheless, Shepherd forced himself back into contention with 3 further wins, including knocking out the Midlands Super Featherweight champion Kelton Mckenzie in 7 pulsating rounds in April 1995 in Solihull.

This earned him a crack at Michael Ayers for the British Lightweight Championship in Potters Bar the following month which he lost in an all out war in 3 rounds against the future WBO World title Challenger.

Ultimately the setback convinced Shepherd to drop down to Super Featherweight and he returned at his new weight to destroy John Stovin in 4 rounds in December, and then he overcame a terrible cut to force a controversial stoppage against Swansea hard man Marc Smith at Crystal Palace in April 1996.

This earned Shepherd earned a crack at the British Super Featherweight title in June 1996 against the defending champion PJ Gallagher, only to lose a very close fight on points, over 12 tough rounds against the champion. The fight was voted number one fight of the year, 1996.

== As champion ==
After the current British champion PJ Gallagher vacated his belt, because of health reasons...... another opportunity arose for the vacant title against Scotsman Davey McHale in Glasgow in September 1997 With Shepherd winning by KO in 10 to win the British title at the 3rd time of asking.

Further successful defences against Matt Brown and Peter Judson to win the Lonsdale belt outright, and he also went on to win and defend the Commonwealth title against Trust Ndlovu and Smith Odoom.

By July 1999 a match was made to fight the American Tom Johnson for the IBO World Title in his hometown of Carlisle where a tight victory was achieved in front of an adoring crowd.

However, in searching for a big payday against Naseem Hamed the decision was made to drop down to the featherweight limit in his first defence and a weight drained Shepherd was swept aside by Algerian-based Frenchman Affif Djelti in 6 rounds.

Despite winning the IBO Intercontinental Championship in his next fight in June 2000 against Ukrainian Rakhim Minhalieyev, essentially the time as champion was over, and successive championship bouts were lost against James Armah, Tontcho Tontchev and Alex Moon. Finally after a majority draw against Glasgow's Barry Hughes for the lightly regarded WBU inter continental strap in May 2004 Shepherd eventually decided to retire from boxing at 37.
