= Frank Johnson (boxer) =

English boxer (1928–1970)

Personal information
- Nickname: Golden Boy
- Nationality: English
- Born: Frank Williamson; 27 November 1928 Withington, Manchester, England
- Died: 7 June 1970 (aged 41)
- Height: 5 ft 7 in (1.70 m)
- Weight: feather/light/welter/middleweight

Boxing career

Boxing record
- Total fights: 58
- Wins: 47 (KO 26)
- Losses: 11 (KO 1)

Frank "Golden Boy" Johnson (27 November 1928 – 7 June 1970) born in Manchester was an English professional feather/light/welter/middleweight boxer of the 1940s and 1950s who won the British Boxing Board of Control (BBBofC) Central Area lightweight title, BBBofC British lightweight title, and British Empire lightweight title, and was a challenger for the British Empire lightweight title against Pat Ford, and BBBofC British welterweight title against Peter Waterman his professional fighting weight varied from 124 lb (56 kg; 8 st 12 lb), i.e. featherweight to 149 lb (68 kg; 10 st 9 lb), i.e. middleweight. Frank Johnson was trained and managed by Jack Bates, and promoted by Jack Solomons.

== Genealogical information ==
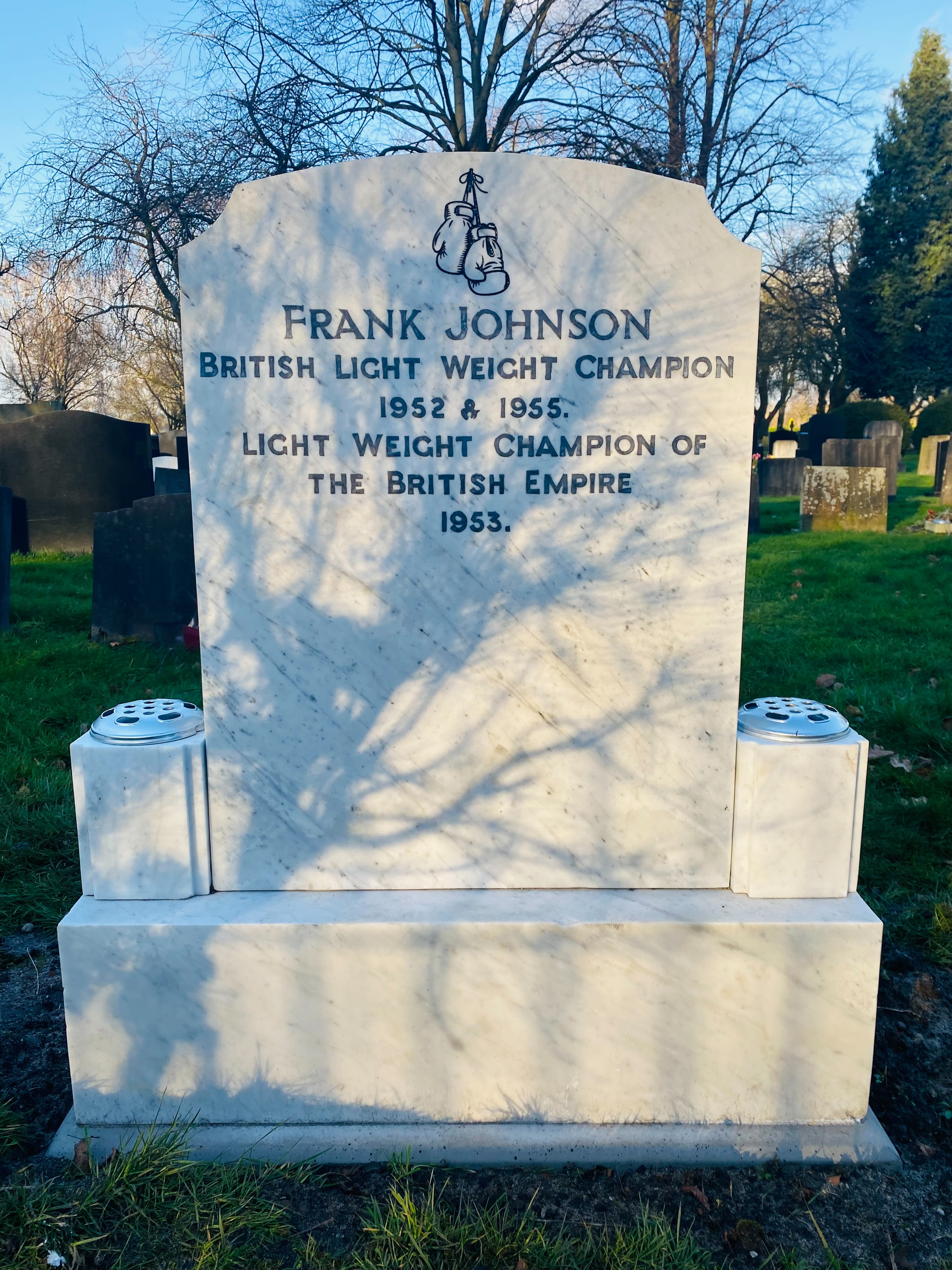
The rear side of Frank Williamson's is inscribed with Johnson's championship titles and a picture of a pair of boxing gloves

Frank Johnson (born Frank Williamson, but adopted the surname Johnson, from notable Manchester boxer Len Johnson) was the younger brother of Rita L. Williamson (birth registered January→March 1922 in Southport), and the 1942 Amateur Boxing Association of England (ABAE) Junior Class-A flyweight champion, boxing out of Manchester County ABC, 1945 Amateur Boxing Association of England (ABAE) lightweight champion, boxing out of Manchester YMCA ABC and BBBofC Central Area welterweight champion boxer Jackie Braddock (birth registered July→September 1927 in Manchester North, born John 'Jackie' Williamson, but adopted the surname Braddock, from world heavyweight champion boxer James J. Braddock), and was the older brother of Hilda Williamson (birth registered January→March 1930 in Manchester South).

== Death ==
Frank Johnson died in June 1970, aged 41, and was buried in Southern Cemetery, Manchester.
