= Langton Tinago =

Zimbabwean boxer (1949–2018)

Personal information
- Nickname: Schoolboy
- Nationality: Zimbabwean
- Born: Langton Tinago; September 28, 1949 Shurugwi, Southern Rhodesia (now Zimbabwe)
- Died: July 17, 2018 (aged 68) Gweru, Zimbabwe
- Weight: super feather/light/light welter/welterweight

Boxing career

Boxing record
- Total fights: 110
- Wins: 86 (KO 16)
- Losses: 20 (KO 4)
- Draws: 3
- No contests: 1

Langton Tinago (28 September 1949 – 17 July 2018) was a Zimbabwean professional super feather/light/light welter/welterweight boxer of the 1960s, 1970s and 1980s, who won the Zimbabwe lightweight title, Zimbabwe welterweight title, Commonwealth lightweight title, and Commonwealth super featherweight title, and was a challenger for the Commonwealth light welterweight title against Billy Famous, his professional fighting weight varied from 131 lb (59 kg; 9 st 5 lb), i.e. lightweight to 141 1/4 lb (64.1 kg; 10 st 1.3 lb), i.e. welterweight.
