= Mambwe =

Mambwe may refer to:

- the Mambwe people
- the Mambwe language
- Patrick Mambwe (born 1944), a Zambian boxer of the 1960s and '70s
