= Felix Bwalya =

Zambian boxer (1967–1997)

Personal information
- Nickname: The Hammer
- Nationality: Zambian
- Born: December 21, 1967 Chingola, Zambia
- Died: December 23, 1997 (aged 30) Lusaka, Zambia
- Weight: Lightweight; Light welterweight

Boxing career
- Stance: Orthodox

Boxing record
- Total fights: 13
- Wins: 12
- Win by KO: 9
- Losses: 1
- Draws: 0
Medal record
Men's amateur boxing
Representing Zambia
All-Africa Games
Gold medal – first place	1991 Cairo	Lightweight

Felix Bwalya (21 December 1967 – 23 December 1997) was a Zambian boxer who won a gold medal at the 1991 All-Africa Games and competed at the 1992 Summer Olympics in Barcelona, Spain. As a professional, he became African champion and went 12–1 (9 KO) on his way to winning the Commonwealth belt. Nicknamed "The Hammer", he captured the African Boxing Union light welterweight and Commonwealth super lightweight titles in 1995 and 1997 respectively, the latter after a controversial victory over Briton Paul Burke in Lusaka. Bwalya subsequently died from head injuries sustained in the fight.

== Early life ==
Bwalya was born on 21 December 1967 in Chingola and although other sources gave his date of birth as 22 December 1969, newspaper reports at the time of his burial stated that he died two days after his 30th birthday. The first born in a family of seven, he attended Maiteneke Primary school in Chingola but only went up to the 7th grade. He started boxing at the age of 12 at Chiwempala Community Hall but his parents were against any serious involvement in boxing so he would sneak out to go to the community hall against his father’s wishes and as punishment, was often made to go to bed hungry.

He eventually convinced his parents that he could make a career out of boxing after winning a gold medal at the 1989 East and Central Africa Boxing Championships.

== Amateur career ==
After showing early promise as a teenager, Bwalya joined Green Buffaloes Stables in 1987 and trained under Vincent Mudenda who helped improve his ringcraft. He soon came to the attention of national selectors and was chosen to be part of Zambia’s boxing contingent bound for the 1988 Seoul Olympics but it ended in disappointment when he was left out at the last minute. “I was left behind at the airport because officials insisted that I was too young,” he recounted.

He overcame the setback when he won a gold medal for Zambia at the 1989 East and Central Africa Boxing Championships. Two years later, he won another gold medal at the 1991 All-Africa Games in Cairo when he beat Tanzania’s Rashid Haji Ally Matumla on points in the final of the 60 kg weight category. He travelled to the next Olympics in Barcelona in 1992 but was defeated by Matumla on points in the first round.

== Professional career ==
Bwalya’s brief participation at the Barcelona Olympics was a turning point in his career as he turned professional the following year under Scorpio Promotions and his first fight was on 17 July 1993 against Forger Siame whom he beat on a TKO. In 1994, he won fights against Zimbabwe’s King Zaka, Bruno Sakabunda and South African Bramley Whiteboy. He again faced Zaka on 10 December 1994 and this time, the Zimbabwean, who had retired injured in the second round of their first fight was knocked out in the first round.

Bwalya then knocked out Kenya’s Dalmas Otieno on 11 March 1995 for the right to contest for the vacant African Boxing Union Super Lightweight title against Ethiopian Gashaw Gudeta in Lusaka on 25 June 1995. Bwalya emerged champion after a TKO in the third round and he staged a successful defence of his title when he beat Ghana’s Akwei Addo in a Commonwealth elimination bout via a TKO in round 4 on 26 August 1995 and earned the right to contest for the vacant Commonwealth (British Empire) Super Lightweight title against Briton Paul Ryan. At the end of the year, Bwalya was crowned Zambian Sportsman of the Year.

With the title fight due to take place on 30 June 1996, Bwalya warmed up for it with a points decision over Sakabunda in Kabwe on 6 April 1996 to register an 11th straight victory but the bout against Ryan was a non-starter as it was postponed indefinitely due to the Commonwealth Boxing Council ruling that the fight could not go on as the British Boxing Board of Control had revoked the British boxer’s licence on medical grounds.

Bwalya got his shot at the Commonwealth title the following year on 22 April 1997, which was by then held by Bernard Paul and he lost by half a point, a decision which was hotly disputed by the Zambian’s camp. Bwalya was offered a rematch later that year but in the meantime, Paul had been dethroned by Paul Burke who travelled to Lusaka for the title fight as champion.

== Paul Burke Fight ==
The 12 round bout against Burke which was promoted by the Zambia Professional Boxing Board of Control (ZPBBC), took place on Sunday, 14 December 1997 at the Mulungushi International Conference Centre in Lusaka. Bwalya dominated the opening rounds and with Burke persistently holding the Zambian, fans registered their displeasure leading to a caution from referee Hugo Mulenga. In the sixth round, Burke suffered what looked like a serious cut above the right eye but referee Hugo Mulenga allowed him to continue. From the seventh round, Bwalya appeared to slacken and allowed Burke to close the points gap.

Bwalya was knocked down three times in the final three rounds and as the 12th round approached, fans started leaving the hall in the belief that he had lost the fight. He was on the canvas after the third knockdown when the final bell sounded, and was helped to his feet by the referee who later said he had been saved by the bell. A number of the fans returned upon hearing the verdict that Bwalya had won, to cheer him as he was handed the belt.

The score card by the referee, who was the sole judge, revealed that Bwalya had won through a 107-105 points decision, over the vociferous complaints by Burke's camp, who claimed the final round was at least two minutes short. Several fans who watched the fight maintained that Burke should have been declared the winner and His trainer Billy Graham said that Burke, from Preston, Lancashire, would lodge a protest with the Commonwealth Boxing Council in order to claim victory by technical knockout.

Burke himself called it a planned dramatic robbery and added that he broke into a hearty laugh when he heard the verdict and said it would not do the development of boxing in the country any good if referees resorted to aiding boxers in robbing fights in such a manner.

Following an outcry in the media and among the boxing fraternity, Mulenga defended his handling of the fight and said his referring was in conformity with international standards. Reacting to accusations that he had deliberately failed to stop the fight when Burke began bleeding profusely and that he gave Bwalya several chances to stand when he was knocked down, said he could not stop the fight because it was up to the doctor and Burke’s camp to decide, adding that Burke’s determination to continue was a clear indication that he was fit to go on with the fight.

“I exercised extreme impartiality throughout the fight and there was only one punch which sent Bwalya to the canvas. As for the other falls, it was as a result of holding and pushing by Burke, who I reprimanded on several occasions,” he said and added that Bwalya slipped and fell on three occasions partly due to the wet canvas in the boxers’ corners due to the accumulation of water sprinkled on the boxers during the intervals.

Mulenga said Bwalya had been leading 107-103 towards the end of the 11th round but Burke jolted him with a punch which dropped Bwalya and saw Burke ascend to 105. Bwalya was almost failing to stand when the final bell went and Mulenga said there was no way he could continue counting after the bell had gone. Zambia Professional Boxing Board of Control (ZPBBC) Chairman Hilary Matyola defended Mulenga’s handling of the fight saying he was among the few competent and experienced boxing referees in the country and all the decisions that he took were above board.

It was reported that Bwalya went on a two-day drinking spree to celebrate his victory with friends and after complaining of a severe headache, he was taken to the University Teaching Hospital around 02:00hrs on the morning of the Tuesday after the fight, where he later slipped into a coma and was transferred to the intensive care unit.

He was later visited by Zambian President Frederick Chiluba and Sports Minister William Harrington who was perturbed when told that Bwalya had complained of a headache a day before the fight and one of his handlers had given him chloroquine, saying the referee should have stopped the fight when Burke sustained the cut on his eye or when Bwalya was knocked down the first time and called for stern action against those responsible. “This is a very sad state of affairs. for this.” He said.

Burke also paid Bwalya a visit and regretted that his condition was life-threatening. “It’s a very sad development that he has been admitted and lying in a coma. My heart goes to his family and the Zambian people. He is a very good boxer and I will keep praying for his recovery. I feel very sorry for this,’ said Burke. A team of doctors was assigned to Bwalya but with no improvement in his condition, a hospital source revealed that a blood sample taken from him confirmed the presence of malaria parasites.

It also transpired that Bwalya was not having proper nutrition in the build-up to the fight with Burke. Bwalya’s manager Yusuf Seedat said money was provided for the boxer’s meals but Bwalya and his trainer Lucky Mutale had to make do with meals from a roadside kiosk before training as the meals at the hotel where they were staying were expensive so Bwalya would have a drink and a bun for breakfast at the kiosk before starting the day’s training. He also said out of concern for his boxer’s health, he administered chloroquine to him when he complained of a headache.

The Boxing Board of Control Chairman Matyola then charged that Mulenga disregarded the rules in his handling of the fight. He said if the referee believed Burke was breaking the rules by persistently holding Bwlaya and hitting him in the back of the head, he should have disqualified him after the second offence. He also admitted that the ZPBBC broke one of its regulations by promoting the fight, but said it was because no local promoter has the money to do so.

The ring side doctor at the fight Dr. Lawson Simapuka said both Mulenga and Matyola ignored his advice to stop the fight in the sixth round when Burke started bleeding profusely from the cut above his eye. He said Mulenga said it was just a cut and the fight had to continue Simapuka said he passed on word to Matyola who was the match commissioner that the fight should be stopped but Matyola also suggested that the fight should continue. He said he went to Burke’s corner and was told the same thing so he could not do anything more as he could only advise the referee to stop the fight.

However, Mulenga denied having been advised to stop the fight saying it was against boxing rules for a referee to talk to any official although he could communicate by way of sign language, which he said never occurred between the two.

He said after Burke started bleeding from the cut above his eye, he called the doctor to examine him and retreated to the neutral corner and only resumed the fight after asking Silwamba if the fight could continue and was given the greenlight. “I feel terrible that Bwalya has died but it was not my fault because if the doctor had told me to stop the fight, I was going to do so. He should tell the truth because I am innocent.”

Bwalya never came out of his coma and died on the afternoon of 23 December 1997 at 16:00hrs. The autopsy revealed that Bwalya died of cardio-respiratory failure, cerebral concussion, severe blunt head injuries and right side broncho-pneumonia. It was also confirmed that he was on malaria treatment, having started taking chloroquine a few days before the fight, which was administered to him by his trainer.

Bwalya was put to rest on 26 December 1997 at Lusaka's Old Leopard's Hill Cemetery. The burial was attended by thousands of boxing fans who took over the proceedings, with some of them demanding an explanation for Bwalya’s death. With tempers rising, Matyola was asked to leave the cemetery for his own safety. It had to take former Commonwealth and African light-heavyweight champion Lottie Mwale and Commonwealth heavyweight title contender Joseph Chingangu to restore calm. The pallbearers were Bwalya’s fellow boxers, among them Chingangu, Zambian light heavyweight champion Mike Chilambe, national light welterweight champion Anthony Mwanza and light welterweight contender Moses Penza.

== Aftermath ==
Soon after Bwalya’s death, Harrington announced that Matyola and two other members of the board and referee Mulenga had been suspended following initial findings of a probe into the fight by the board. Harrington also instituted a five-man independent committee to investigate the circumstances surrounding Bwalya's death. Led by Zambia Judo Association President Father Jude McKenna, the committee was to, among other terms of reference, determine adequacy of preparations for the fight and the competence of the referee, find out why the BBC promoted the fight and determine whether the board were aware of the boxer’s ill-health. The team’s report was to be handed in at the end January 1998.

The following year, the ZPBBC was dissolved for its role in Bwalya’s death.

== Professional boxing record ==
13 fights	12 wins	1 loss
By knockout	9	0
By decision	3	1

No.	Result	Record	Opponent	Type	Round, time	Date	Location	Notes
13	Win	12–1	(United Kingdom) Paul Burke	PTS	12	Dec 13, 1997	Lusaka, Zambia	Won Commonwealth super lightweight title
12	Loss	11–1	(United Kingdom) Bernard Paul	PTS	12	April 22, 1997	(United Kingdom) York Hall, London, England	For vacant Commonwealth super lightweight title
11	Win	11–0	(Zambia) Bruno Sakabunda	PTS	10	Apr 6, 1996	Kabwe, Zambia	
10	Win	10–0	(Ghana) Akwei Addo	TKO	4 (?)	Aug 26, 1995	Lusaka, Zambia	
9	Win	9–0	(Ethiopia) Gashaw Gudeta	TKO	3 (12)	Jun 25, 1995	Lusaka, Zambia	Won vacant African light-welterweight title
8	Win	8–0	(Kenya) Dalmas Otieno	KO	4 (?)	Mar 11, 1995	Lusaka, Zambia	
7	Win	7–0	(Zimbabwe) King Zaka	KO	1 (12)	Dec 10, 1994	Lusaka, Zambia	Won vacant Africa Zone 6 light welterweight title
6	Win	6–0	(South Africa) Bramley Whiteboy	KO	1 (6)	Nov 10, 1994	Lusaka, Zambia	
5	Win	5–0	(Zambia) Bruno Sakabunda	PTS	6	May 28, 1994	Lusaka, Zambia	
4	Win	4–0	(Zimbabwe) King Zaka	RTD	2 (?)	Mar 26, 1994	Harare, Zimbabwe	
3	Win	3–0	(Zambia) Charles Shiliya	KO	6 (6)	Nov 6, 1993	Kabwe, Zambia	
2	Win	2–0	(Zambia) Samson Siwila	KO	1 (12)	Oct 2, 1993	Lusaka, Zambia	Won vacant Zambia light welterweight title
1	Win	1–0	(Zambia) Forger Siame	TKO	6 (6)	Jul 17, 1993	Lusaka, Zambia	
