= George Ayeh =

Ghanaian boxer

Personal information
- Nickname: Thunder
- Nationality: Ghanaian
- Born: Ghana
- Weight: feather/super feather/lightweight

Boxing career

Boxing record
- Total fights: 23
- Wins: 18 (KO 4)
- Losses: 5 (KO 2)

George "Thunder" Ayeh is a Ghanaian professional feather/super feather/lightweight boxer of the 1980s and '90s who won the Ghanaian featherweight title, Commonwealth featherweight title, and Commonwealth super featherweight title, his professional fighting weight varied from 126 lb (57 kg; 9 st 0 lb), i.e. featherweight to 134 lb (61 kg; 9 st 8 lb), i.e. lightweight.
