= P. J. Gallagher (boxer) =

British boxer

PJ Pat Gallagher
Personal information
- Nickname: GaleForce
- Nationality: British
- Born: Patrick Joseph Gallagher; 14 February 1973 (age 53) Manchester, England
- Weight: Super Featherweight

Boxing career
- Stance: Orthodox

Boxing record
- Total fights: 20
- Wins: 19
- Win by KO: 9
- Losses: 1

PJ Pat Gallagher (born 14 February 1973) is a former boxer who was the undefeated British super featherweight champion in 1996.

== As an amateur ==
Gallagher started boxing at the age of nine. He joined the Angel Amateur Boxing Club and stayed there throughout his Amateur Career. He was trained under Paul Hammick as a junior and Colin Wilson took over when Gallagher turned senior.

Gallagher had 80 Amateur fights, winning 65 and losing 15. He won many national titles as a top class amateur boxer, including the Junior ABAs And the NABC class A Titles in 1988 and NABC class B Title and finished the year by winning a gold medal in the golden gloves tournament in 1989

Gallagher then went on to win the Senior London ABA lightweight title in 1992 and eventually lost in the Senior ABA Semi-Finals in a disputed decision to the Eventual Champion.

Gallagher represented His country between 1989 and 1992 throughout Europe against countries such as the United States, Turkey, Bulgaria, Iran, Germany and Hungary. His best achievement as an amateur boxer was winning a Bronze Medal at the European Championship which were held in Bulgaria.

== Early professional career ==
Gallagher made his professional debut in September 1993 with a Technical Knockout (TKO) win over John Kelly at the York Hall in Bethnal Green. He compiled an unbeaten ledger of 13-0 (7 KO) with wins over the likes of Chris Clarkson, Marco Fattore and Marc Smith before getting a crack at the vacant Southern Area title in November 1995. He won the title with sixth-round KO win over Justin Murphy at York Hall in Bethnal Green.

== WBC international title ==
In January 1996, PJ Pat Gallagher got the chance to add to his Southern Area title belt for the Vacant World Boxing Council (WBC) international title against Rakhim Mingaleev from Russia at Bracknell Leisure centre. Gallagher won the bout on a unanimous decision over 12 rounds which moved his record to 15-0 (8 KO).

== British champion ==
In April 1996 PJ Pat Gallagher fought Davey McHale from Scotland for the British Super-Feather Title at National Sports Centre in Crystal Palace with the fight ending in a 10th-round KO win for Gallagher after McHale failed to beat the referee's count.

== British title defence ==
PJ Pat Gallagher 1st defence of his Title was against Charles Shepherd at Erith in Kent. In what was voted the BBB&C fight of the year for 1996 ended in Gallagher winning a split decision and bringing his record to 17-0 (9 KO). Gallagher also came no 2 in the BBB&C Boxer of the year with Naseem Hamed coming 1st. Shepherd went on to win the British, Commonwealth and IBO World titles after Gallagher had retired from boxing.

== Illness ==
In February 1997, a mystery illness struck PJ Pat Gallagher plans to dominate the British scene, in a warm up fight against journey man Bamana Dibateza over 8 rounds at Grundy Park Leisure Centre in Cheshunt, Gallagher lost on points and did not look himself that night. After seeking medical help, PJ Pat Gallagher was suffering from low testosterone levels which made him feel weak, unfit. Gallagher continued training harder to make himself feel fit which only added harm to his body and a 1st defeat, PJ Pat Gallagher gave up his British title belt and took time out of the ring to recover.

== Comeback ==
PJ Pat Gallagher made a comeback in June 2000 against old foe Marco Fattore at the Ulster Hall in Belfast which ended in Gallagher winning all six rounds and dropping his opponent on the way to a points win. Next up for Gallagher was David Kehoe at Elephant & Castle Centre in Southwark. Over 6x3 Gallagher won on all scorecards and waved goodbye to his fans as he announced his retirement from the sport and finished with a professional record of 19-1 (9KO).

== Garden City Runners ==
PJ Pat Gallagher begin running half and full marathons all year round for Garden City Runners, as Pat Gallagher, to raise funds for his chosen charities. PJ Pat Gallagher has run the London Marathon twice, Rotterdam Netherlands, Edinburgh Scotland and later this year is hoping to run the Boston Marathon and come in under the 3 Hour mark. In 2010, at the first ever Virgin London Marathon, PJ Pat Gallagher completed the 26.6 Miles in 2 Hours, 59 minutes and 20 seconds.

In October 2010, PJ Pat Gallagher, Enter the lifestyle-sports-adidas-dublin-marathonas As Patrick Gallagher, Who become the fastest runner dressed as a leprechaun to run a marathon, with the time of 3 hours 8 minutes and 55 seconds. And raising money for the Downs Syndrome Association.
