= Jeff Malcolm =

Australian boxer (born 1956)

Personal information
- Nickname: Flash
- Nationality: Australian
- Born: 9 May 1956 (age 70) Cowra
- Height: 5 ft 10 in (1.78 m)
- Weight: lightweight light welterweight welterweight light middleweight middleweight super middleweight

Boxing career
- Stance: Southpaw

Boxing record
- Total fights: 138
- Wins: 100 (KO 36)
- Losses: 27 (KO 3)
- Draws: 11

Jeff "Flash" Malcolm (born 9 May 1956 in Cowra, New South Wales), is an Australian professional boxer who fought from 1971 until 2002. He won the Australian light welterweight title, New South Wales (Australia) State lightweight title, Australasian light welterweight title, South Pacific light welterweight title, Queensland (Australia) State welterweight title, International Boxing Council (IBC) welterweight title, South Pacific welterweight title, World Boxing Federation (WBF) Intercontinental welterweight title, WBF welterweight title, Pan Asian Boxing Association (PABA) welterweight title, World Boxing Association (WBA) Fedelatin welterweight title, PABA light middleweight title, and Commonwealth light welterweight title. He was also a challenger for the South Seas light welterweight title against Pat Leglise, Australian welterweight title against Wilf Gentzen, and World Boxing Organization (WBO) welterweight title against Manning Galloway. His professional fighting weight varied from 135 lb (61 kg; 9 st 9 lb), i.e. lightweight to 165 1/4 lb (75.0 kg; 11 st 11.3 lb), i.e. super middleweight. He was inducted into the Australian National Boxing Hall of Fame in 2007.
