= Leo Young (boxer) =

Australian boxer

Leo Young Jr
Personal information
- Nationality: Australian
- Born: Leo Yurewicz; 12 February 1969 (age 57) Victoria
- Weight: light middle/middleweight

Boxing career
- Stance: Orthodox

Boxing record
- Total fights: 17
- Wins: 15 (KO 6)
- Losses: 1 (KO 0)
- Draws: 1

Leo Young Jr (born 12 February 1969 in Victoria) is an Australian professional light middle/middleweight boxer of the 1990s who won the Victoria (Australia) State light middleweight title, Victoria (Australia) State middleweight title, Australian light middleweight title, and Commonwealth light middleweight title (twice), his professional fighting weight varied from 152 lb (69 kg; 10 st 12 lb), i.e. light middleweight to 158 1/4 lb (71.8 kg; 11 st 4.3 lb), i.e. middleweight.
