= Patrick Mambwe =

Zambian boxer (born 1944)

Personal information
- Nationality: Zambian
- Born: Patrick Mambwe; 8 June 1944 (age 82) Kitwe, Zambia
- Weight: fly/super fly/bantam/super bantam/featherweight

Boxing career

Boxing record
- Total fights: 32
- Wins: 23 (KO 5)
- Losses: 7 (KO 2)
- Draws: 2

Patrick Mambwe (born 8 June 1944 in Kitwe) is a Zambian professional fly/super fly/bantam/super bantam/featherweight boxer of the 1960s and '70s who won the Zambia bantamweight title, and Commonwealth flyweighttitle, his professional fighting weight varied from 111 lb (50 kg; 7 st 13 lb), i.e. flyweight to 125 lb (57 kg; 8 st 13 lb), i.e. Featherweight.

Managed by legendary (and controversial) Zambian-based Nigerian Gibson Nwosu, who was also a promoter and referee, Patrick Mambwe was probably the most disciplined and hardest-working of all professional boxers Zambia has ever had. Mambwe holds a special place in the history of Zambian boxing. In 1976, he became the first boxer in Zambia to win a Commonwealth title after stopping Australian Gwynne Jones in the sixth round of a flyweight contest. Two years later, Mambwe won the African Boxing Union (ABU) bantamweight title when Ivorian champion, 42-year-old Baba De Keita, came out of his dressing room refusing to fight him and simply handing over the belt. It was also the first time a Zambian boxer won an African championship. Furthermore, Mambwe became the first boxer to hold the two titles simultaneously. Lottie Mwale and John "Big Joe" Sichula were the second and third respectively to grab the two belts. They also each held both championships at the same time.

Patrick Mambwe had a full-time job at the Zambia Consumer Buying Corporation (ZCBC), a state enterprise, in Kitwe. He was said to be a gentleman and family-oriented. In the ring, he combined power, speed and unfaltering determination. In his amateur and early pro-career days, he trained with the likes of Fix Njilamanda, a highly-respected fellow Zambian pugilist.

In a fifteen-round ABU championship encounter at Rokana Mine Hall in Kitwe, Mambwe and Ghanaian wrestler Haruna Chico were tied until Chico buckled in a late round. The fight was regarded as one of Mambwe's most career-defining matchups.

Mambwe's boxing career ended after he traveled to London for a Commonwealth flyweight title defense against Charlie Magri. According to reports, he failed the medical examination after a cataract was identified in one eye. Following surgery in Kitwe, he later suffered a night attack that affected the operated eye, and he did not return to professional boxing.
