= Billy Famous =

Nigerian boxer

Personal information
- Nationality: Nigerian
- Born: Lagos, Nigeria
- Weight: light/light welterweight

Boxing career

Boxing record
- Total fights: 31
- Wins: 24 (KO 18)
- Losses: 6 (KO 4)
- Draws: 1

Billy Famous (born in Lagos), is a Nigerian professional light/light welterweight boxer of the 1970s and '80s who won Nigerian lightweight title, Nigerian light welterweight title, African Boxing Union (ABU) light welterweight title, and Commonwealth lightweight title, his professional fighting weight varied from 135 lb (61 kg; 9 st 9 lb), i.e. lightweight to 139 1/2 lb (63.3 kg; 9 st 13.5 lb), i.e. light welterweight.
