= Joe Tetteh =

Ghanaian boxer

Personal information
- Nationality: Ghanaian
- Born: 10 December 1941 Accra, Ghana
- Died: 20 April 2002 (aged 60)
- Weight: super feather/light/light welterweight

Boxing career
- Stance: Orthodox

Boxing record
- Total fights: 79
- Wins: 45 (KO 25)
- Losses: 29 (KO 7)
- Draws: 5

Joe Tetteh (10 December 1941 – 20 April 2002) born in Accra was a Ghanaian professional super feather/light/light welterweight boxer of the 1950s, '60s and '70s who won the Ghanaian featherweight title, and inaugural British Commonwealth light welterweight title, and was a challenger for the West African featherweight title against Lat Shonibare, British Commonwealth featherweight title against Floyd Robertson, and All African lightweight title Ould Makloufi, his professional fighting weight varied from 127 1/4 lb (57.7 kg; 9 st 1.3 lb), i.e. super featherweight to 139 1/2 lb (63.3 kg; 9 st 13.5 lb), i.e. light welterweight.

Tetteh fought around the world as a professional boxer, including in Sweden, Australia, New Zealand, Italy, the United Kingdom—where he fought frequently—Spain and France. In his last bout as a professional, he boxed Ken Buchanan, being knocked out in three rounds by the Scottish future world champion and member of the International Boxing Hall of Fame.
