= Johnson Tshuma =

Zimbabwean boxer (born 1970)

Personal information
- Nationality: Zimbabwean
- Born: Johnson Tshuma; 30 September 1970 (age 55) Zimbabwe
- Weight: light middle/middleweight

Boxing career

Boxing record
- Total fights: 28
- Wins: 24 (KO 12)
- Losses: 4 (KO 1)

Johnson Tshuma (born 30 September 1970) is a Zimbabwean professional light middle/middleweight boxer of the 1990s who won the Natal (South Africa) Middleweight Title, South African middleweight title, and Commonwealth middleweight title, and was a challenger for the South African light middleweight title against Mpush Makambi, his professional fighting weight varied from 151 1/2 lb (68.7 kg; 10 st 11.5 lb), i.e. light middleweight to 160 lb (73 kg; 11 st 6 lb), i.e. middleweight.
