= James Armah =

Ghanaian boxer

Personal information
- Nickname: Bukom Fire
- Nationality: Ghanaian
- Born: 11 March 1976 (age 50) Accra, Ghana
- Height: 5 ft 7 in (1.70 m)
- Weight: feather/super feather/light/light welter/welter/light middleweight

Boxing career
- Reach: 70 in (178 cm)
- Stance: Orthodox

Boxing record
- Total fights: 23
- Wins: 19 (KO 9)
- Losses: 4 (KO 3)

James "Bukom Fire" Armah (born 11 March 1976) is a Ghanaian professional boxer of the 1990s, 2000s and 2010s who won the African Boxing Union featherweight title, Commonwealth lightweight title, and Commonwealth super featherweight title, and was a challenger for the WBO Asia Pacific light welterweight title (twice), WBO Oriental light welterweight title, and WBA Pan African light welterweight title, against Chad Bennett. His professional fighting weight varied from featherweight to light middleweight.

After marrying, he and his wife decided in 2017 to move to Grafton, New South Wales, Australia, where his wife has family. In Grafton, Armah became involved with the local amateur boxing club.
