= Wilf Gentzen =

Australian boxer

Personal information
- Nationality: Australian
- Born: 3 April 1963 (age 63) Melbourne
- Weight: light welter/welterweight

Boxing career

Boxing record
- Total fights: 22
- Wins: 18 (KO 14)
- Losses: 3 (KO 2)
- Draws: 1

Wilf Gentzen (born 3 April 1963, in Melbourne) is an Australian professional light welter/welterweight boxer of the 1980s and '90s who won the Victoria (Australia) State welterweight title, Australian welterweight title, Commonwealth welterweight title, and was a challenger for the World Boxing Council (WBC) International light welterweight title against Tony Jones, his professional fighting weight varied from 139 lb (63 kg; 9 st 13 lb), i.e. light welterweight to 146 3/4 lb (66.6 kg; 10 st 6.8 lb), i.e. welterweight.
