= Nthokozo Tshuma =

Zimbabwean footballer (born 1985)

Personal information
- Date of birth: 29 October 1985 (age 41)
- Place of birth: Bulawayo, Zimbabwe
- Height: 1.79 m (5 ft 10 in)
- Position: Midfielder

Senior career*
Years	Team	Apps	(Gls)
2009–?	Hwange		
2011–2012	Platinum		
2013–2015	How Mine		

International career^{‡}
2011	Zimbabwe	1	(0)
- * Club domestic league appearances and goals as of 13 November 2020 ‡ National team caps and goals as of 13 November 2020

Nthokozo Tshuma (born 29 October 1985) is a retired Zimbabwean football midfielder.
