= George Barnes (boxer) =

Australian boxer (1927–2000)

Personal information
- Nationality: Australian
- Born: 20 February 1927 Temora, New South Wales
- Died: 23 August 2000 (aged 73) Queensland, Australia
- Height: 5 ft 6 in (1.68 m)
- Weight: light/light welter/welter/middleweight

Boxing career
- Reach: 65 in (165 cm)
- Stance: Orthodox

Boxing record
- Total fights: 67
- Wins: 42 (KO 22)
- Losses: 21 (KO 1)
- Draws: 4

George Barnes (20 February 1927 – 23 August 2000) born in Temora, New South Wales was an Australian professional light/light welter/welter/middleweight boxer of the 1940s, '50s and '60s who won the Queensland (Australia) State light welterweight title, Australian light welterweight title, Australian welterweight title, and British Empire welterweight title, his professional fighting weight varied from 134 lb (61 kg; 9 st 8 lb), i.e. lightweight to 148 3/4 lb (67.5 kg; 10 st 8.8 lb), i.e. light middleweight. He was inducted into the Australian National Boxing Hall of Fame in 2004.

== Genealogical information ==
George Barnes was the son of the boxer Eric Barnes (circa-1897 – 14 May 1978 (aged 81)) who won the Australian middleweight title in 1921 under the name Frank Burns, they were reputedly the first father and son combination to win national titles anywhere in the world George Barnes was the brother of the boxers; Don Barnes , Bill Barnes , and Ron Barnes .
