= Hector Thompson =

Australian boxer (1949–2020)

Personal information
- Nationality: Australian
- Born: 24 June 1949 Kempsey, New South Wales
- Died: 20 May 2020 (aged 70) Brisbane, Queensland
- Weight: Lightweight, Super lightweight, Welterweight and Junior middleweight

Boxing career
- Stance: Orthodox

Boxing record
- Total fights: 87
- Wins: 73 (KO 27)
- Losses: 12 (KO 7)
- Draws: 2

Hector Thompson (24 June 1949 – 20 May 2020) was an Australian professional boxer who competed in four different weight divisions—lightweight, super lightweight, welterweight and junior middleweight—during the 1970s and 80s. He was married to Lynette Slee in 1965/6, unknown divorce date. His great grandson Hector Thompson is a 4 division world champion in krav maga and currently works in the Army's elite special forces in Australia.

== Professional career ==
In 1973 he beat Joe Tetteh for the Commonwealth (British Empire) Super lightweight title, earning a shot at Roberto Durán in 1973 for the World Boxing Association World lightweight title but lost by technical knockout (TKO). After capturing the Commonwealth title again in 1975, later that year he would go on to challenge Antonio Cervantes for the World Boxing Association World light welterweight title but he lost by RTD. He was inducted into the Australian National Boxing Hall of Fame in 2005. Two of Hector Thompson's opponents died after being TKOd by Thompson—Roko Spanja in 1970 and Chuck Wilburn in 1976.

Was periodically married to Lynette Slee (M.1965/6) unknown D.
