= Paul Burke (boxer) =

English boxer

Paul Burke (born 25 July 1966 - 17 July 2025 in Preston, Lancashire) was a former professional boxer from England, who competed in the lightweight and light welterweight divisions (– 60 kg). His career highlight was beating Bernard Paul to become the lightweight commonwealth champion. He went on to successfully defend the title numerous times with good wins over rivals in the division.

Achievements
| Preceded by Bernard Paul | Commonwealth Light Welterweight Champion; 30 August 1997 – 13 December 1997 | Succeeded by Felix Bwalya |
| Preceded by Felix Bwalya; Died | Commonwealth Light Welterweight Champion; 30 November 1998 – 13 October 1999 | Succeeded by Eamon Magee |

== See also ==
- List of British lightweight boxing champions
