= Pat Ford (boxer) =

Australian boxer (1931–2012)

Personal information
- Nationality: Australian
- Born: 11 May 1931 Orange, New South Wales
- Died: 26 July 2012 (aged 81)
- Height: 5 ft 10 1/2 in (1.79 m)
- Weight: light/welterweight

Boxing career
- Reach: 71 in (180 cm)
- Stance: Orthodox

Boxing record
- Total fights: 26
- Wins: 20 (KO 16)
- Losses: 6 (KO 2)

Pat Ford (11 May 1931 – 26 July 2012) was an Australian professional light/welterweight boxer of the 1950s who won the Australian lightweight title, and British Empire lightweight title, his professional fighting weight varied from 133 1/2 lb (60.6 kg; 9 st 7.5 lb), i.e. lightweight to 138 lb (63 kg; 9 st 12 lb), i.e. welterweight. He was inducted into the Australian National Boxing Hall of Fame in 2006. Ford suffered from Alzheimer's disease in the last 12 years of his life. He died on 26 July 2012, at the age of 81.

== Professional boxing record ==
Career Record date opponent record

location result

26 1955-05-30

Lahouari Godih 31 3 2 Sydney Stadium, Sydney, New South Wales, Australia L DQ 25 1955-05-02

Don McTaggart 39 7 4 Sydney Stadium, Sydney, New South Wales, Australia W TKO 24 1955-03-21

Lahouari Godih 29 3 2 Sydney Stadium, Sydney, New South Wales, Australia L PTS 23 1954-07-02

Ivor Germain 31 16 2 West Melbourne Stadium, Melbourne, Victoria, Australia W PTS Commonwealth (British Empire) lightweight title

22 1954-04-09

Ivor Germain 30 15 2 West Melbourne Stadium, Melbourne, Victoria, Australia L PTS Commonwealth (British Empire) lightweight title

21 1954-02-26

Agustin Argote 31 10 6 West Melbourne Stadium, Melbourne, Victoria, Australia L PTS 20 1953-12-11

Agustin Argote 29 9 6 West Melbourne Stadium, Melbourne, Victoria, Australia L KO 19 1953-11-13

Ivor Germain 29 13 2 West Melbourne Stadium, Melbourne, Victoria, Australia W PTS 18 1953-10-09

Frank Johnson 36 3 0 West Melbourne Stadium, Melbourne, Victoria, Australia W KO Commonwealth (British Empire) lightweight title

17 1953-08-28

Frank Johnson 36 2 0 West Melbourne Stadium, Melbourne, Victoria, Australia W PTS Commonwealth (British Empire) lightweight title

16 1953-07-24

Jackie Ryan 29 9 1 West Melbourne Stadium, Melbourne, Victoria, Australia W TKO Australian lightweight title

15 1953-05-08

Frank Flannery 33 17 9 West Melbourne Stadium, Melbourne, Victoria, Australia W TKO

Australian lightweight title

14 1953-03-09

Joe McEntee 22 4 0 Sydney Stadium, Sydney, New South Wales, Australia W TKO 13 1953-02-13

Ray Fitton 30 14 8 West Melbourne Stadium, Melbourne, Victoria, Australia W TKO 12 1952-11-24

Ray French 14 0 4 Sydney Stadium, Sydney, New South Wales, Australia W TKO 11 1952-10-31

Eric Boon 97 21 5 Brisbane Stadium, Brisbane, Queensland, Australia W TKO 10 1952-10-03

Alfie Clay 15 9 3 Brisbane Stadium, Brisbane, Queensland, Australia W TKO 9 1952-09-12

Gordon Meredith 14 7 0 Brisbane Stadium, Brisbane, Queensland, Australia W TKO 8 1952-07-25

Dave Landers 35 22 3 Brisbane Stadium, Brisbane, Queensland, Australia W TKO 7 1952-06-23

Charlie Dunn 22 8 3 Sydney Stadium, Sydney, New South Wales, Australia W TKO 6 1952-06-13

Jackie Ryan 24 8 1 Brisbane Stadium, Brisbane, Queensland, Australia W KO 5 1951-12-03

Mickey Anelzark 36 8 4 Sydney Stadium, Sydney, New South Wales, Australia W TKO 4 1951-10-15

Teddy Dillon 13 5 0 Sydney Stadium, Sydney, New South Wales, Australia W KO 3 1951-07-02

Charlie Dunn 20 6 3 Dubbo, New South Wales, Australia L KO 2 1951-07-02

Charlie Ward 11 11 1 Sydney Stadium, Sydney, New South Wales, Australia W TKO 1 1951-05-25

Gordon Meredith 7 2 0 Dubbo, New South Wales, Australia W PTS
