= Alex Moon =

English boxer

Personal information
- Nickname: The Full-Moon
- Nationality: English
- Born: 17 November 1971 (age 54) Liverpool, England
- Height: 5 ft 7 in (1.70 m)
- Weight: feather/super feather/light/light welter/welter/light middleweight

Boxing career
- Reach: 67 in (170 cm)
- Stance: Orthodox

Boxing record
- Total fights: 27
- Wins: 19 (KO 6)
- Losses: 6 (KO 2)
- Draws: 2

Alex "The Full-Moon" Moon (born 17 November 1971) born in Liverpool is an English professional feather/super feather/light/light welter/welter/light middleweight boxer of the 1990s and 2000s, who won the World Boxing Union (WBU) Intercontinental Featherweight Title, and Commonwealth super featherweight title, and was a challenger for the British Boxing Board of Control (BBBofC) British featherweight title against Jon Jo Irwin, and International Boxing Organization (IBO) super featherweight title against Affif Djelti, his professional fighting weight varied from 125 lb (57 kg; 8 st 13 lb), i.e. featherweight to 149 lb (68 kg; 10 st 9 lb), i.e. light middleweight.
