= Ray Wheatley =

Australian boxer and sportswriter (1948–2023)

Raymond Douglass Wheatley OAM (25 July 1948 – 20 June 2023) was an Australian Boxing Hall of Fame official and a Golden Gloves boxing champion. A heavyweight contender, he was also an International Boxing Federation supervisor, referee and judge of world championship title fights in Australia, America, South Africa, China, South Korea, New Zealand, Philippines, Thailand and Indonesia. He was a regular guest on Sky Channel KO show during the 1990s with Mathew Brooks and in 2005 and 2006 was a broadcaster on Foxtel Fenech Fight Night with Andy Raymond and Colonel Bob Sheridan also Sports Sunday with Ken Sutcliffe in 1997 on channel Nine Television Network. Gold Logie winner Don Lane interviewed Wheatley and former Australian light middleweight champion John Layton on 2KY at Parramatta studio in 1989 about professional boxers working as security officers (Bouncers) in Sydney clubs. Don Lane became interested after reading an article in the People magazine about this subject. Wheatley was a commentator on ESPN documentary - Ali The Greatest Of All Time with Kostya Tszyu, Joe Bugner, Jeff Fenech. Also on ESPN Speed and Power with Grantlee Kieza and Jeff Fenech. Wheatley was inducted into the Australian Boxing Hall Of Fame in 2012 along with Joe Bugner, Wally Taylor and Robbie Peden.

Wheatley was voted International Boxing Federation vice-president in Acapulco, Mexico in June 2000 and held that position until 2012 when he resigned in Waikiki, Hawaii. Wheatley attended regular Board meetings in New York, Las Vegas, San Francisco, Orlando, Miami, Phoenix, New Orleans, San Antonio, Toronto, Canada, San Juan, Puerto Rico, Puerto Vallarta, Mexico, Hamburg, Germany, Panama City, Panama, Waikiki, Hawaii.

Wheatley was editor and publisher of World of Boxing, from 1992 to 2013, which is a record of 21 years of a continuous boxing publication in Australia under the one publisher. He was also publisher of Title Fight (1997–2007) and The Greatest magazine (three issues).

In 2010, Wheatley was promoted to International Editor of the leading boxing website FIGHTNEWS.

Wheatley was the 2012 Inductee to the Australian National Boxing Hall of Fame Non-Combatants category.

== Career ==
=== Boxer ===
Wheatley started boxing as an amateur in 1963, under Pat Rochford at the Parramamtta Police Boys club. He won his first ten bouts by knockout. In 1964, he won the New South Wales featherweight title. At the Balmain Leagues club in 1967, Wheatley won the New South Wales Golden Gloves welterweight title. In 1968 Wheatley was defeated by Dennis Mason from Narrabri in the light middleweight division at the NSW championships. Bill McConnell, who trained world bantamweight champion Jimmy Carruthers, asked if Wheatley would like to train with him. Wheatley finished his amateur career with a record of 25 wins and four losses.

Wheatley turned professional in 1969, and competed in nine bouts. He retired from boxing in 1971. In 1969, Wheatley boxed future world Middleweight title challenger Tony Mundine, dropping him with a right hand shot in round one. Mundine got up and stopped Wheatley in the following round.

After twelve years in retirement, Wheatley made a comeback in 1983 and defeated Australian heavyweight contenders Leo Moore and Brian Fitzsimmons. He lost to Australian heavyweight champion Dean Waters and top contender Rudy Darno.

=== Official ===
Wheatley refereed, judged or supervised world IBF title bouts in Australia, USA, China, South Africa, Indonesia, South Korea, Philippines, New Zealand and Thailand. He worked as an official on four Kostya Tszyu IBF title bouts in Australia and USA. In 2002, he was an IBF supervisor for IBF heavyweight world title bout Evander Holyfield vs Chris Byrd in Atlantic City. He was also an IBF official on bouts featuring world champions Vic Darchinyan, Lovemore Ndou, Nonito Donaire and Muhammad Rachman.

Wheatley was voted Vice President of the International Boxing Federation in Acapulco Mexico in 2000.

Wheatley resigned from IBF Board in 2012.

=== Publisher ===
Wheatley published World of Boxing in 1992 with Jeff Harding and Manny Hinton on the cover. The final issue was published in April 2013 with Daniel Geale and Graham Shaw on the cover. It had been distributed throughout Australia and New Zealand. The longest surviving (21 years) boxing publication under one publisher. It was regarded as "Australia's Bible of Boxing". The chief boxing writer was Grantlee Kieza and the chief photographer - Werner Kalin.

In 1997, Wheatley published Title Fight magazine, which was distributed throughout Australia and New Zealand until 2007. Wheatley was on the rating committee of KO Magazine for Editor Steve Farhood (1998–2000). Wheatley was also on the IBF Ratings Committee from 2000. In 2008, Wheatley published The Greatest by Kieza. Wheatley appeared as a regular television commentator on Sky Channel's KO Boxing with Jeff Fenech and Mathew Brooks during the 1990s.

=== Commentator ===
In 2005 and 2006 Wheatley was a commentator on Foxtel Cable Television's Fenech Fight Night. During the 1990s Wheatley was Australian correspondent for Virgil Thrasher's Boxing Update and Flash publication.

In 2007 Wheatley was a regular guest on 2SM radio on Saturday boxing program In Your Corner with Mark Warren and Johnny Lewis.

Wheatley was Australian correspondent for Fight Fax record book that was published and distributed worldwide during the 1990s by editor Phil Marder. Wheatley has had several boxing articles published in Australia's leading newspaper - The Telegraph over a fifteen-year period.

In 2003 Wheatley was a commentator with Jeff Fenech, Kostya Tszyu, Joe Bugner and Ern McQuillan jnr on ESPN Special Ali - The Greatest of All Time. In 2004, Wheatley was a commentator with Grantlee Kieza and Jeff Fenech on ESPN Special Speed and Power.

In 2010 Wheatley was promoted to International Editor to the leading boxing website Fightnews.

YouTube video interviews that have been conducted by Wheatley and published on Fightnews include, Kostya Tszyu, Jeff Harding, Charkey Ramon, Troy Waters, Colonel Bob Sheridan, Daniel Geale, Lovemore Ndou, Gary Shaw, Sam Soliman, Kevin Barry, Marlon Wright, Danny Green, Ricky Hatton, Philip Fondu, Lucas Browne, Arthur Tunstall, George Kambosos, Solomon Haumono, Tim Tszyu, Justin Fortune, Nikita Tszyu, Barry Michael, Tony Weeks, Bruce McTavish, Dave Paris, Brad Vocale, Father Dave Smith, Billy Dib, Sakio Bika, Bill Treacy, Garrie Francisco, Kevin Johnson, Joe Diaz, Paul Nasari, Jimmy Chaichotchuang, Liu Gang, Robert Hoyle, Kali Meehan, Shannan Taylor, Ryan Waters, Joe Brunker, Alex Leapai, Grantlee Kieza, Lauryn Eagle, Susie Ramadan.

World's leading referees interviewed by Wheatley include Pete Podgorski, Jack Reiss, Robert Byrd, Pat Russell, Bruce McTavish, Tony Weeks, Wayne Kelly, Randy Neumann, Steve Smoger, Marty Denkin, Micky Vann, Dave Paris.

World's leading officials interviewed by Wheatley include Glenn Hamada and Mike Fitzgerald.

Boxing greats interviewed by Wheatley include Larry Holmes (2000), George Foreman (1995), Evander Holyfield (1991), Colonel Bob Sheridan, Riddick Bowe (1996), Jake LaMotta (1988), Tommy Hearns (1994), Marvin Hagler (1995), Emile Griffith (1992), Joe Bugner, Roy Jones, Michael Spinks (1995) Azumah Nelson, Juan LaPorte, Alexis Arguello (2009) Cedric Kushner (2009), Donny Lalonde, Bob Arum (1995), Don King (1996), Tim Witherspoon (1995), Shane Mosley (1999), Wladimir Klitschko (2008), Sven Ottke (2008), Arthur Abraham (2008), Bernard Hopkins (2002), Felix Trinidad (1995), Dwight Qawi (1997), Jose Torres (2003), Paul Spadafora (2003), Scott LeDoux (1994), Bill Brennan (1996) and Bob Lee (1996).

Australians interviewed by Wheatley include Vic Patrick, George Barnes, Bob Dunlop, Lionel Rose, Johnny Famechon, Jeff Harding, Danny Green, Jeff Fenech, Lester Ellis, Barry Michael, Charkey Ramon, Troy Waters, Lovemore Ndou, Kostya Tszyu, Vic Darchinyan, Daniel Geale, Sam Soliman, Billy Dib, Robbie Peden, Gairy StClair.

== Death ==
Wheatley died on 20 June 2023, at the age of 74.

== Recognition ==
- 2008: Awarded the Order of Australia Medal (OAM) in the Birthday Honours "for service to boxing as an administrator, judge and referee, and through contributions to publications."
- 2011: Snowy Robbins Trophy by the NSW Veteran Boxers.
- 2012: Australian Boxing Hall Of Fame
