= Australian National Boxing Hall of Fame =

Hall of Fame for Australian boxers

The Australian National Boxing Hall of Fame is a sports hall of fame which was founded in 2001 and began inducting boxers into the Hall of Fame in 2003. Since then annual induction dinners have been held across Australia.

Inductees are nominated and then voted upon by a panel of boxing experts and historians across Australia.

The Hall of Fame has now introduced an ANBHOF Fighter of the year and also the Gus Mercurio Memorial Award for services to boxing for those who are not Inducted into the Australian National Boxing Hall of Fame.

== Inductees ==
=== Legends ===
- Les Darcy (2009)
- Lionel Rose (2010)
- Johnny Famechon (2012)
- Jeff Fenech (2013)

=== Pioneers ===
- Young Griffo (2003)
- Larry Foley (2003)
- Peter Jackson (2004)
- Frank Slavin (2005)
- Joe Goddard (2006)
- Jim Hall (2007)
- Jim Barron (2007)
- Bill Farnan (2008)
- Jack McGowan (2008)
- Bill Doherty (2009)
- Tim Hegarty (2010)
- Dan Creedon (2011)
- Peter Felix (2012)
- Mick Dooley (2013)
- Otto Cribb (2014)
- Herb McKell (2015)
- Jim Burge (2016)
- George Dawson (2017)
- James "Tut" Ryan (2018)

=== Old Timers ===
- Les Darcy (2003)
- Ambrose Palmer (2003)
- Jack Carroll (2003)
- Billy Grime (2003)
- Bill Lang (2004)
- Hugh Dwyer (2004)
- Tommy Uren (2005)
- Fred Henneberry (2005)
- Jackie Green (2006)
- Bill Squires (2006)
- George Mendies (2007)
- Herb McCoy (2007)
- Sid Godfrey (2008)
- Jerry Jerome (2008)
- Dave Smith (2009)
- Hughie Mehegan (2009)
- Mickey Miller (2010)
- Merv Blandon (2010)
- Fred Kay (2011)
- Frank Thorn (2012)
- Jack Haines (2013)
- Alf Blatch (2014)
- Bert Spargo (2015)
- Colin Bell (2016)
- Arthur Cripps (2017)
- Hockey Bennell (2018)

=== Veterans ===
- Ron Richards (2003)
- Vic Patrick (2003)
- Jimmy Carruthers (2003)
- Dave Sands (2003)
- Tommy Burns (2004, born Geoffrey Murphy)
- George Barnes (2004)
- Elley Bennett (2005)
- Jack Hassen (2005)
- Pat Ford (2006)
- Trevor King (2006)
- Mickey Tollis (2007)
- Frank Flannery (2007)
- George Bracken (2008)
- Eddie Miller (2008)
- Bobby Sinn (2009)
- Clive Stewart (2009)
- Tony Madigan (2010)
- Rocky Gattellari (2010)
- Jeff White (2011)
- Wally Taylor (2012)
- Max Carlos (2013)
- Jack Johnson (2014)
- Darby Brown (2015)
- Russell Sands (2016)
- Bobby Dunne (2017)
- Al Bourke (2018)

=== Modern ===
- Johnny Famechon (2003)
- Lionel Rose (2003)
- Barry Michael (2003)
- Jeff Fenech (2003)
- Rocky Mattioli (2004)
- Jeff Harding (2004)
- Tony Mundine (2005)
- Hector Thompson (2005)
- Paul Ferreri (2006)
- Bob Dunlop (2006)
- Lester Ellis (2007)
- Jeff Malcolm (2007)
- Lawrence Austin (2008)
- Charkey Ramon (2008)
- Henry Nissen (2009)
- Troy Waters (2009)
- Kostya Tszyu (2010)
- Wally Carr (2010)
- Steve Aczel (2011)
- Robbie Peden (2012)
- Guy Waters (2013)
- Brian Janssen (2014)
- Tony Miller (2015)
- Ken Salisbury (2016)
- Paul Briggs (2017)
- Shannan Taylor (2018)

=== Non-Combatants ===
- HD McIntosh (2003)
- Snowy Baker (2003)
- Jack Dunleavy (2003)
- Ron Casey (2004)
- John Wren (2004)
- Merv William (2005)
- Ray Mitchell (2005)
- Johnny Lewis (2006)
- Bill Mordey (2007)
- Ray Connelly (2007)
- Gus Mercurio (2008)
- Jack Rennie (2008)
- William Lawless (2009)
- John McDougall (2009)
- Ern McQuillan Sr (2010)
- Billy Males (2010)
- Jimmy Sharman (2011)
- Ray Wheatley (2012)
- William Corbett (2013)
- Terry Reilly (2014)
- Bill McConnell (2015)
- Joe Wallis (2016)
- Grantlee Kieza (2017)
- Tom Maguire (2018)

=== Honorary Internationals ===
- Jack Johnson (2003)
- Freddie Dawson (2003)
- Sam Langford (2004)
- Archie Moore (2005)
- Bob Fitzsimmons (2006)
- Tod Morgan (2007)
- Ted "Kid" Lewis (2007)
- Tommy Burns (2009)
- Jimmy Clabby (2010)
- Clarence Reeves (2011)
- Joe Bugner (2012)
- "Hop" Harry Stone (2013)
- Jem Mace (2014)
- Eugène Criqui (2015)
- Eddie McGoorty (2016)
- Fritz Holland (2017)
- Lovemore N'Dou (2018)

=== Gus Mercurio Memorial Award ===
- Howard Leigh (2016)
- Peter Maniatis (Boxing Promoter )(2017)
- Paul Nasari (2018)

=== ANBHOF Fighter of the year award ===
- Zac Dunn (2015)
- Jayde Mitchell (2016)
- Jeff Horn (2017)
- T.J. Doheny (2018)

== See also ==
- Boxing Australia which governs Amateur boxing in Australia
- Australian National Boxing Federation which governs Professional boxing in Australia
