= Claude Noel (boxer) =

Trinidad and Tobago boxer (1948–2023)

Personal information
- Born: 25 July 1948 Roxborough, Trinidad and Tobago
- Died: 21 May 2023 (aged 74) San Juan–Laventille, Trinidad and Tobago
- Height: 5 ft 8 in (173 cm)
- Weight: Lightweight

Boxing career
- Stance: Orthodox

Boxing record
- Total fights: 41
- Wins: 31
- Win by KO: 18
- Losses: 10

Claude Noel CM (25 July 1948 – 21 May 2023) was a Tobagonian professional boxer. During his career, which spanned from 1973 to 1984, Noel held the WBA lightweight title and the Commonwealth Lightweight title.

== Early life ==
Born on 25 July 1948 in Roxborough, Tobago to Thelma Fraser and Gabriel "Alfred" Noel. In his early teenage life, Noel began selling mangoes and other tropical fruits before branching off to boxing in 1973.

== Professional career ==
Noel began his professional career on 13 November 1973, fighting in Port-of-Spain, he beat Art de Freitas by second round knockout. After a run of four victories Noel successfully challenged for his first title, the Trinidad & Tobago Lightweight title. The fight, scheduled for fifteen rounds, was stopped in the tenth with Noel's opponent, Fitzroy Guisseppi, unable to continue.

On 16 June 1979, Noel challenged for a version of the world title for the first time. Prior to this fight Noel had built up a record of nineteen wins and just two losses, both against Lennox Blackmoore via tenth round technical knockout. Noel and his opponent, the Venezuelan Ernesto Espana, were fighting for the WBA title recently vacated by Roberto Durán. The fight started badly for Noel as Espana scored a first round knock down. Although he was able to recover, he was knocked down once again in the ninth round and he was unable to beat the referee's count for the third knockdown, which ended the fight in the thirteenth.

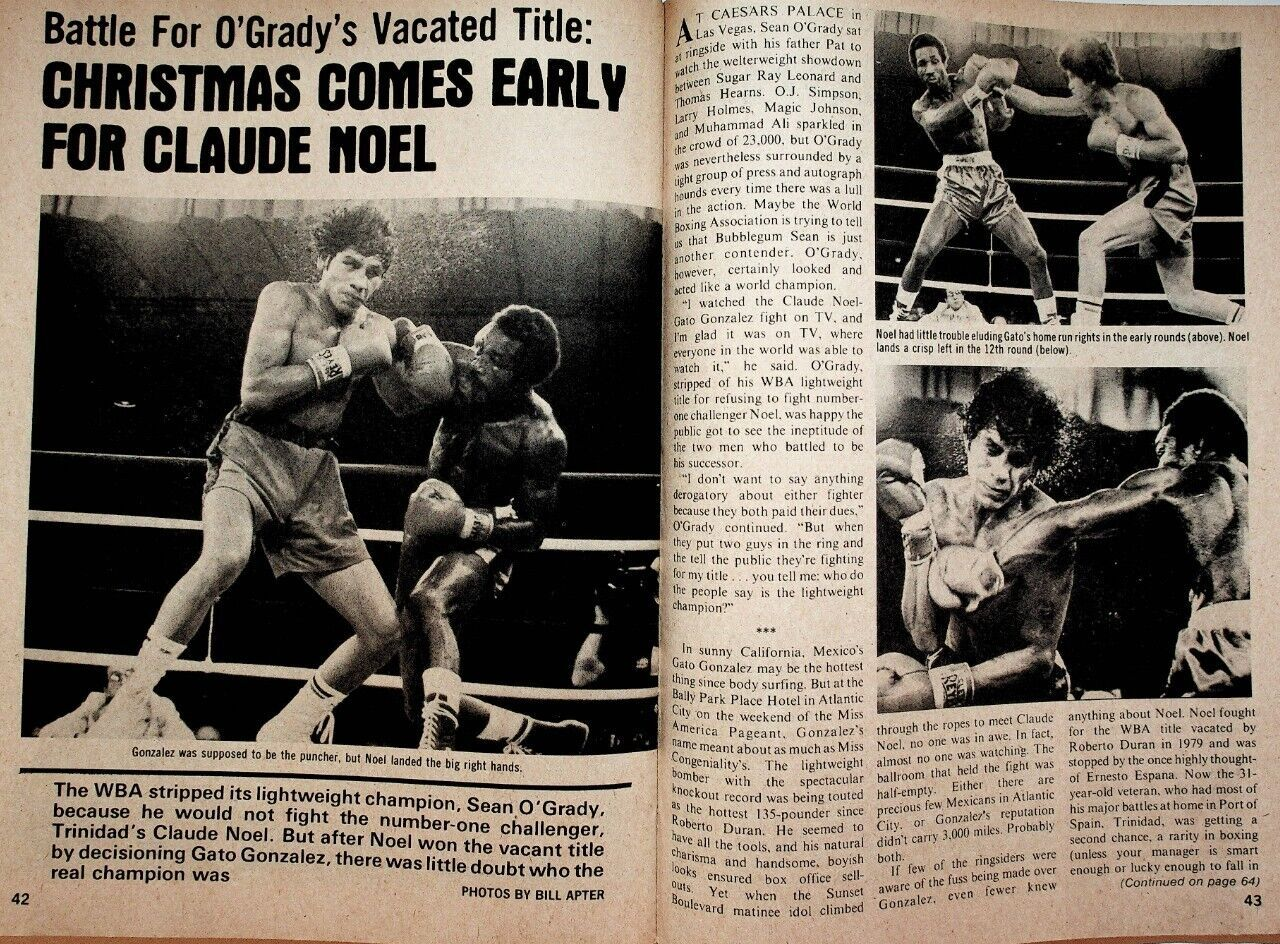
Coverage of the fight between Noel and González by Bill Apter

Two years later on 12 September 1981, Noel once again challenged for the WBA title, this time successfully. The opponent for the fight, which took place in Atlantic City, New Jersey, was the Mexican boxer Rodolfo González. Noel started the fight well but had to withstand a strong finish by the Mexican. The bout went the distance and the scores were read out as: 145-140, 145-141 and 144-141, all in favour of Noel.

Noel's first defence of his title was on 5 December 1981 against the American challenger, and late replacement, Arturo Frias. Frias dominated the fight, which took place in Las Vegas, Nevada, before knocking Noel out in the eighth round.

Although Noel never fought for a world title again, he was able to win the Commonwealth Lightweight title and defend it twice. Noel fought ten more times after his final world title fight, losing six, most notably to the renowned Nicaraguan Alexis Arguello, when he suffered a horrid body injury during round three due to a body punch. Noel's final fight took place on 2 November 1984, and he lost the fight, and his Commonwealth title, to Graeme Brooke by a unanimous decision.

== Professional boxing record ==
| 41 fights | 31 wins | 10 losses |
|---|---|---|
| By knockout | 18 | 7 |
| By decision | 13 | 3 |

| No. | Result | Record | Opponent | Type | Round, time | Date | Location | Notes |
|---|---|---|---|---|---|---|---|---|
| 41 | Loss | 31–10 | Graeme Brooke | UD | 12 (12) | 1984-11-02 | Festival Hall, Melbourne, Australia | Lost Commonwealth lightweight title |
| 40 | Loss | 31–9 | Tsuyoshi Hamada | KO | 4 (10) | 1984-09-09 | Korakuen Hall, Tokyo, Japan | |
| 39 | Loss | 31–8 | Mario Cusson | UD | 10 (10) | 1984-07-10 | Forum, Montreal, Canada | |
| 38 | Loss | 31–7 | René Arredondo | TKO | 2 (10) | 1984-05-17 | Olympic Auditorium, Los Angeles, California, U.S. | |
| 37 | Win | 31–6 | Davidson Andeh | TKO | 7 (12) | 1984-03-17 | Port of Spain, Trinidad and Tobago | Retained Commonwealth lightweight title |
| 36 | Win | 30–6 | Steve Asson | PTS | 12 (12) | 1983-12-02 | Jean Pierre Sports Complex, Port of Spain, Trinidad and Tobago | Retained Commonwealth lightweight title |
| 35 | Loss | 29–6 | Alexis Argüello | TKO | 3 (10) | 1983-04-24 | Showboat Hotel and Casino, Atlantic City, New Jersey, U.S. | |
| 34 | Loss | 29–5 | Howard Davis Jr. | UD | 10 (10) | 1982-11-12 | Orange Bowl, Miami, Florida, U.S. | |
| 33 | Win | 29–4 | Barry Michael | MD | 15 (15) | 1982-07-22 | Festival Hall, Melbourne, Australia | Won Commonwealth lightweight title |
| 32 | Win | 28–4 | Steve Asson | PTS | 15 (15) | 1982-05-14 | Jean Pierre Sports Complex, Port of Spain, Trinidad and Tobago | Retained Trinidad and Tobago lightweight title |
| 31 | Loss | 27–4 | Arturo Frias | KO | 8 (15) | 1981-12-05 | Showboat Hotel and Casino, Las Vegas, Nevada, U.S. | Lost WBA lightweight title |
| 30 | Win | 27–3 | Rodolfo González | UD | 15 (15) | 1981-09-12 | Bally's Park Place, Atlantic City, New Jersey, U.S. | Won vacant WBA lightweight title |
| 29 | Win | 26–3 | Roberto Madrid | TKO | 5 (10) | 1981-07-24 | Jean Pierre Sports Complex, Port of Spain, Trinidad and Tobago | |
| 28 | Win | 25–3 | Gaétan Hart | TKO | 3 (10) | 1981-03-24 | Paul Sauvé Arena, Montreal, Canada | |
| 27 | Win | 24–3 | Johnny Summerhays | UD | 10 (10) | 1980-11-08 | Port of Spain, Trinidad and Tobago | |
| 26 | Win | 23–3 | Antonio Cruz | SD | 12 (12) | 1980-05-17 | Jean Pierre Sports Complex, Port of Spain, Trinidad and Tobago | |
| 25 | Win | 22–3 | Michael Reid | PTS | 10 (10) | 1980-03-28 | Port of Spain, Trinidad and Tobago | |
| 24 | Win | 21–3 | Jerome Artis | UD | 10 (10) | 1980-02-29 | Jean Pierre Sports Complex, Port of Spain, Trinidad and Tobago | |
| 23 | Win | 20–3 | Francisco Becerra | KO | 5 (?) | 1980-01-18 | Port of Spain, Trinidad and Tobago | |
| 22 | Loss | 19–3 | Ernesto España | KO | 13 (15) | 1979-06-16 | Roberto Clemente Coliseum, San Juan, Puerto Rico | For vacant WBA lightweight title |
| 21 | Win | 19–2 | Gaétan Hart | UD | 10 (10) | 1979-03-30 | Port of Spain, Trinidad and Tobago | |
| 20 | Win | 18–2 | Pedro Acosta Nunez | PTS | 12 (12) | 1978-12-15 | Port of Spain, Trinidad and Tobago | |
| 19 | Win | 17–2 | Augustin Estrada | UD | 10 (10) | 1978-11-07 | Orlando Sports Stadium, Orlando, Florida, U.S. | |
| 18 | Win | 16–2 | Scotty Foreman | KO | 2 (10) | 1978-10-24 | Orlando Sports Stadium, Orlando, Florida, U.S. | |
| 17 | Win | 15–2 | Warren Matthews | KO | 2 (10) | 1978-08-08 | Orlando Sports Stadium, Orlando, Florida, U.S. | |
| 16 | Win | 14–2 | Hilbert Stevenson | TKO | 3 (10) | 1978-07-25 | Orlando Sports Stadium, Orlando, Florida, U.S. | |
| 15 | Win | 13–2 | Frankie Moultrie | KO | 2 (10) | 1978-06-06 | Orlando Sports Stadium, Orlando, Florida, U.S. | |
| 14 | Win | 12–2 | Fitzroy Guisseppi | KO | 9 (15) | 1978-02-10 | Port of Spain, Trinidad and Tobago | Retained Trinidad and Tobago lightweight title |
| 13 | Win | 11–2 | Hector Julio Medina | KO | 10 (10) | 1977-12-16 | Sparrow's Hideaway, Port of Spain, Trinidad and Tobago | |
| 12 | Win | 10–2 | Larry Stanton | PTS | 10 (10) | 1977-10-07 | Port of Spain, Trinidad and Tobago | |
| 11 | Win | 9–2 | Vinnie DeBarros | TKO | 4 (?) | 1977-07-30 | Port of Spain, Trinidad and Tobago | |
| 10 | Win | 8–2 | Rafael Solis | PTS | 10 (10) | 1977-06-03 | Pointe-à-Pitre, Guadeloupe | |
| 9 | Loss | 7–2 | Lennox Blackmoore | TKO | 10 (?) | 1977-05-29 | Port of Spain, Trinidad and Tobago | |
| 8 | Win | 7–1 | Easy Boy Lake | KO | 4 (?) | 1977-05-17 | Saint Croix, United States Virgin Islands | |
| 7 | Loss | 6–1 | Lennox Blackmoore | TKO | 10 (?) | 1977-02-25 | Port of Spain, Trinidad and Tobago | |
| 6 | Win | 6–0 | Francisco Cruz | KO | 3 (?) | 1977-02-11 | Pointe-à-Pitre, Guadeloupe | |
| 5 | Win | 5–0 | Fitzroy Guisseppi | TKO | 10 (15) | 1976-11-26 | Port of Spain, Trinidad and Tobago | Won Trinidad and Tobago lightweight title |
| 4 | Win | 4–0 | Selwyn Figarro | TKO | 8 (?) | 1976-09-20 | Port of Spain, Trinidad and Tobago | |
| 3 | Win | 3–0 | Clive Nichols | TKO | 6 (8) | 1975-10-23 | Port of Spain, Trinidad and Tobago | |
| 2 | Win | 2–0 | Michael Baptiste | KO | 4 (?) | 1975-06-16 | Port of Spain, Trinidad and Tobago | |
| 1 | Win | 1–0 | Art de Freitas | KO | 2 (?) | 1973-11-13 | Port of Spain, Trinidad and Tobago | |

== Death and legacy ==
Noel died on 21 May 2023, at the age of 74.

The Claude Noel Highway in Tobago was named for him, in recognition of his sporting achievements.

== See also ==
- List of world lightweight boxing champions

Sporting positions
Regional boxing titles
| Preceded by Fitzroy Guisseppi | Trinidad and Tobago lightweight champion November 26, 1976 – November 2, 1984; Retired | Vacant Title next held by Alric Johnson |
| Preceded by Barry Michael | Commonwealth lightweight champion July 22, 1982 – November 2, 1984 | Vacant Title next held by Graeme Brooke |
World boxing titles
| Vacant Title last held by Sean O'Grady | WBA lightweight champion September 12, 1981 – December 5, 1981 | Succeeded by Arturo Frias |
