= Claude Noel Highway =

Highway in Trinidad and Tobago

Route information
- Length: 12.5 km (7.8 mi)
- Existed: 1981–present

Major junctions
- West end: Canaan
- East end: Scarborough

Location
- Country: Trinidad and Tobago
- Major cities: Scarborough

Highway system
- Transport in Trinidad and Tobago

The Claude Noel Highway, sometimes referred to as CNH, is one of the major west–east highways in Trinidad and Tobago, named after Claude Noel, it is the only highway in Tobago. It runs from Canaan to Scarborough.

== Description ==
=== Route ===
The Claude Noel Highway is the only highway on the island of Tobago, connecting Milford Road to Windward Road, and providing direct access to Scarborough.

The highway begins just outside of Canaan at the junction with Shirvan Road. From here, the highway runs as a 2-lane single carriageway past Tobago Plantations, Lowlands, Carnbee, Lambeau and Scarborough before the route transfers to the Windward Road just outside Bacolet.

=== Exit list ===
The following table lists the major junctions along the Claude Noel Highway. The entire route is located in Tobago.

| Region | Location | Km | Mile | Exit | Destinations | Notes |
|---|---|---|---|---|---|---|
| Tobago | Canaan | 0 | 0.0 | — | Milford Road – Crown Point – A.N.R. Robinson International Airport; Shirvan Road – Plymouth | Western terminus; Continuation from Milford Road. |
| Tobago | Mount Pleasant | 0.5 | 0.31 | 1 | Canoe Bay Road | |
| Tobago | Lowlands | 1.3 | 0.81 | 2 | Tobago Plantations | |
| Tobago | Lowlands | 2 | 1.2 | 3 | Milford Old Road | |
| Tobago | Lowlands | 2.6 | 1.6 | 4 | Gulf City Mall | |
| Tobago | Lowlands | 2.9 | 1.8 | 5 | All Fields Trace | |
| Tobago | Carnbee | 3.4 | 2.1 | 6 | Auchenskeoch Buccoo Bay Road – Buccoo | Access via Roundabout |
| Tobago | Signal Hill | 5 | 3.1 | 7 | Signal Hill Road | |
| Tobago | Lambeau | 5.4 | 3.4 | 8 | Cemetery Street | |
| Tobago | Scarborough | 6 | 3.7 | 9 | Farm Road | |
| Tobago | Scarborough | 6.1 | 3.8 | 10 | Signal Hill Road – Scarborough General Hospital | |
| Tobago | Scarborough | 6.7 | 4.2 | 11 | Orange Hill Road, Milford Road | |
| Tobago | Scarborough | 8.1 | 5.0 | 12 | Plymouth Road, Wilson Road | |
| Tobago | Scarborough | 8.9 | 5.5 | 13 | Northside Road, Bacolet Street | |
| Tobago | Scarborough | 9.6 | 6.0 | 14 | Calder Hill Road | |
| Tobago | Scarborough | 11.2 | 7.0 | 15 | Dwight Yorke Stadium | |
| Tobago | Scarborough | 11.6 | 7.2 | 16 | Bacolet Street, Sunstone Boulevard | |
| Tobago | Scarborough | 12.5 | 7.8 | - | Windward Road – Roxborough, Charlotteville | Eastern terminus; roadway continues east as Windward Road |
1.000 mi = 1.609 km; 1.000 km = 0.621 mi: Closed/former; Concurrency terminus; Incomplete access; Tolled; Route transition; Unopened

=== Features ===
The highway is a 2 lane single carriageway for its entire length, where additional lanes are only found at junctions. Most intersections on the highway are signalized with the exception of a roundabout at Auchenskeoch Buccoo Bay Road. The speed limit is 80 kilometers per hour and overtaking is not permitted on most of the highway.
