= Crown Point Lighthouse =

Crown Point Lighthouse (Tobago)
- Location: Crown Point; Scarborough; Tobago
- Coordinates: 11°08′54.0″N 60°50′42.0″W

Tower
- Foundation: concrete basement
- Construction: metal skeletal tower
- Height: 26 metres (85 ft)
- Shape: square pyramidal skeletal tower with balcony and light
- Power source: solar power

Light
- Focal height: 35 metres (115 ft)
- Range: 16 nautical miles (30 km; 18 mi)
- Characteristic: Fl (4) W 20s.

Crown Point Lighthouse is an active lighthouse located in Scarborough, on the south west extremity of Tobago in the nearby the airport. The lighthouse consist of a square metal tower with gallery and lantern 26 metres (85 ft) high and has a focalheight of 35 metres (115 ft). It is powered by solar unit and emits an alternating group of four white flashing repeated every 20 seconds visible up to 16 nautical miles (30 km; 18 mi).

== See also ==
- List of lighthouses in Trinidad and Tobago
