= List of lighthouses in Trinidad and Tobago =

This is a list of lighthouses in Trinidad and Tobago.

== Trinidad Lighthouses ==
Name	Image	Year built	Location & coordinates	Class of Light	Focal height	NGA number	Admiralty number	Range nml
Brigand Hill Lighthouse	Image	1958	Sangre Grande; 10°29′44.2″N 61°04′04.6″W	Fl (2+1) W 30s.	217 metres (712 ft)	16108	J5915	20
Chacachacare Lighthouse		1897	Chacachacare; 10°41′56.6″N 61°45′09.6″W	Fl W 10s.	251 metres (823 ft)	16256	J5846	26
Chupara Point Lighthouse		n/a	San Juan–Laventille; 10°48′42.9″N 61°21′51.2″W	Fl (2) W 10s.	99 metres (325 ft)	16264.7	J5843	16
Espolon Point Lighthouse		n/a	Gaspar Grande; 10°39′52.6″N 61°39′57.6″W	Fl W 4s.	13 metres (43 ft)	16236	5856	8
Galeota Point Lighthouse		n/a	Rio Claro–Mayaro; 10°08′18.7″N 60°59′29.1″W	Fl W 5s.	87 metres (285 ft)	16109	J5914	13
Galera Point Lighthouse		1897	Sangre Grande; 10°50′03.0″N 60°54′35.2″W	Oc W 10s.	43 metres (141 ft)	16266	J5842	16
Grieger Channel Range Front Lighthouse	Image	n/a	Port of Spain; 10°39′16.4″N 61°31′17.1″W	Oc W 4s.	41 metres (135 ft)	16190	J5884.24	10
Grieger Channel Range Rear Lighthouse	Image	n/a	Port of Spain; 10°39′19.2″N 61°31′11.8″W	Iso W 2s.	119 metres (390 ft)	16190.1	J5884.25	11
La Cerriere Lighthouse		n/a	Couva–Tabaquite–Talparo; 10°19′37.1″N 61°27′11.4″W	Fl W 2.5s.	71 metres (233 ft)	16152	J5895	17
Punta del Arenal Lighthouse		1870 est.	Siparia region 10°02′58.6″N 61°55′39.0″W	Fl W 7.5s.	22 metres (72 ft)	16116	J5912	16
Taparo Point Lighthouse		n/a	Siparia region 10°03′30.0″N 61°37′36.0″W	Fl (3) W 15s.	69 metres (226 ft)	16111	J5913.4	13
Savoneeta Range Front Lighthouse	Image	n/a	Couva–Tabaquite–Talparo; 10°24′14.4″N 61°29′24.2″W	Fl W 2s.	30 metres (98 ft)	16180	J5891	8
Savoneeta Range Rear Lighthouse	Image	n/a	Couva–Tabaquite–Talparo; 10°24′34.3″N 61°29′00.7″W	Oc W 4s.	41 metres (135 ft)	16184	J5891.1	8
Sea Lots Channel Range Front Lighthouse	Image	n/a	Port of Spain; 10°38′30.8″N 61°29′41.8″W	Oc W 10s.	26 metres (85 ft)	16197	J5882	6
Sea Lots Channel Range Rear Lighthouse	Image	n/a	Port of Spain; 10°38′36.9″N 61°29′31.9″W	Fl W 2s.	39 metres (128 ft)	16197.1	J5882.1	6

== Tobago Lighthouses ==
Name	Image	Year built	Location & coordinates	Class of Light	Focal height	NGA number	Admiralty number	Range nml
Crown Point Lighthouse		n/a	Crown Point; 11°08′54.0″N 60°50′42.0″W	Fl (4) W 20s.	35 metres (115 ft)	15200	J5841.5	16
Scarborough Lighthouse		n/a	Scarborough; 11°10′38.4″N 60°43′36.2″W	Fl (2) W 20s.	141 metres (463 ft)	15184	J5838	20

== See also ==
- Lists of lighthouses and lightvessels
