= Piarco International Airport =

Airport serving Port of Spain, Trinidad and Tobago

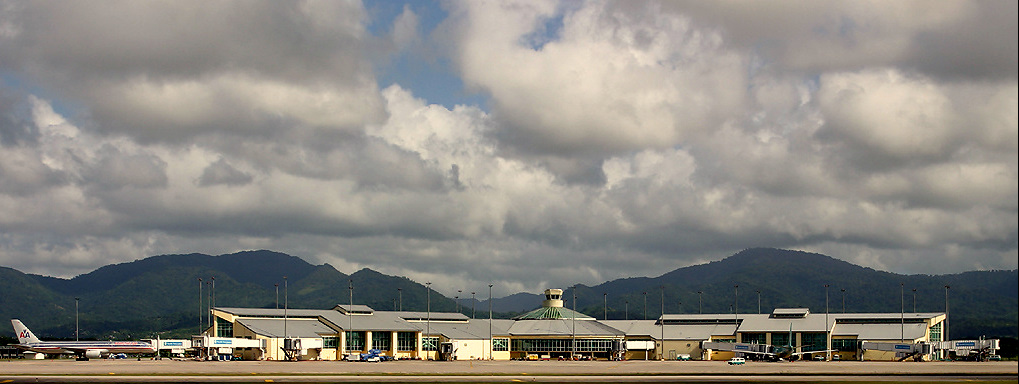
- IATA: POS; ICAO: TTPP; WMO: 78970

Summary
- Airport type: Public
- Owner/Operator: Airports Authority of Trinidad and Tobago
- Serves: Trinidad
- Location: Piarco, Tunapuna–Piarco, Trinidad and Tobago
- Opened: 8 January 1931; 95 years ago
- Hub for: Amerijet International; Caribbean Airlines
- Elevation AMSL: 18 m (59 ft)
- Coordinates: 10°35′43″N 061°20′14″W
- Website: www.tntairports.com

Map
- Location in Trinidad and Tobago

Runways
Direction	Length		Surface
Direction	m	ft	Surface
10/28	3,200	10,499	Asphalt

Statistics (2019)
- International passengers: 1,941,141
- Domestic passengers: 981,862
- Total passengers: 2,923,003
- Sources: Aerodrome charts DAFIF

Piarco International Airport (IATA: POS, ICAO: TTPP) is an international airport serving the island of Trinidad and is one of two international airports in Trinidad and Tobago. The airport is 30 km (19 mi) east of Downtown Port of Spain, in the suburban town of Piarco. The airport is the primary hub and operating base for the country's national airline, as well as the Caribbean's largest airline, Caribbean Airlines.

== History ==
The Piarco Airport opened on 8 January 1931, to serve Venezuela's Compagnie Générale Aéropostale. Before this, the Queen's Park Savannah, the Mucurapo Field, and the Cocorite Docks (for flying boats) were used as airstrips to serve the island.

=== World War II ===
During World War II, the initial airfield served the Royal Navy as the base for the Fleet Air Arm’s No. 1 Observer Training School. Referred to as Royal Naval Air Station Piarco (RNAS Piarco), it opened on 1 August 1940 and later commissioned as HMS Goshawk on 6 November. The squadrons listed below were stationed there until their disbandment during October 1945. HMS Goshawk was decommissioned on 28 February 1946 RNAS Piarco closed on the same day:

==== Squadrons at HMS Goshawk ====
List of Fleet Air Arm first and second line squadrons, station flight and other flying units either based at or disembarked to RNAS Piarco (HMS Goshawk):

Based squadrons

- 749 Naval Air Squadron, an Observer Training Squadron, was a component of the No.1 Observer School. Established on 1 January 1941, it ceased operations on 1 October 1945. It was quipped with the amphibious aircraft the Supermarine Walrus and the Grumman Goose along with Avro Anson multirole training aircraft.
- 750 Naval Air Squadron, an Observer Training Squadron, was also a component of Royal Navy’s No.1 Observer School. It arrived at the station on 5 November 1940 following relocation from the UK. The squadron disbanded on 10 October 1945. It was equipped with the torpedo bombers Blackburn Shark and Fairey Albacore, and the torpedo/dive bomber Fairey Barracuda.
- 752 Naval Air Squadron was an Observer Training Squadron and also a component of the No.1 Observer School of the Royal Navy. The squadron arrived at the station on 5 November 1940 after being relocated from the UK. It disbanded on 9 October 1945. It was equipped with Percival Proctor radio trainer/communications aircraft, de Havilland Tiger Moth training aircraft and Fairey Albacore torpedo bomber,
- 793 Naval Air Squadron, an Air Towed Target Unit, a component of No.1 Observer School. It arrived at the station on 18 November 1940 after being relocated from the UK. It disbanded on 10 October 1945. It was equipped with the fighter aircraft Blackburn Roc, Miles Martinet T.T.1 target tug, Fairey Fulmar fighter/reconnaissance aircraft and Fairey Albacore.

Disembarked squadron

- 'Z' Flight 817 Naval Air Squadron, a Torpedo, Spotter, Reconnaissance Squadron. Consisting of Fairey Albacore, it arrived here from the RN Air Section at USNAS Norfolk, Virginia on 21 September 1943. Aircraft were withdrawn and re-issued to 750 Squadron. Personnel departed for USNAS Norfolk on 27 September 1943.

USAAF

In 1942 it was also used by both the United States Army Air Forces Sixth Air Force and United States Navy air squadrons. The airport was used both as a transport airfield and also for anti submarine patrol flights over the south Caribbean.

In World War II the United States Army Air Forces Sixth Air Force stationed the following units at the airport performing anti submarine patrols:

- 1st Bombardment Squadron (9th Bombardment Group) 24 April – 29 October 1941 (B-18 Bolo)
- 10th Bombardment Squadron (25th Bombardment Group) 27 August – 12 October 1943 (B-18 Bolo)
- 35th Bombardment Squadron (25th Bombardment Group) 27 August – 12 October 1943 (B-18 Bolo)

It was returned to civil control after the war ended on 28 February 1946.

== Modern day ==
In December 2019, the European Union awarded the Airports Authority of Trinidad and Tobago a grant of 1.5 million euros to finance the installation of a large-scale solar panel system at the Piarco International Airport, where ground-mounted solar panels will be installed with an annual generation capacity of 1,443,830 kWh and potentially avoid 1,010 metric tons of CO_{2} emissions annually.

From 2021 to 2023, Piarco International Airport was rated the best airport in the Caribbean by Skytrax, winning the honor over three consecutive years.

In 2021, it was also named third best in the Caribbean and Latin American regions.

== Facilities ==
Apron view

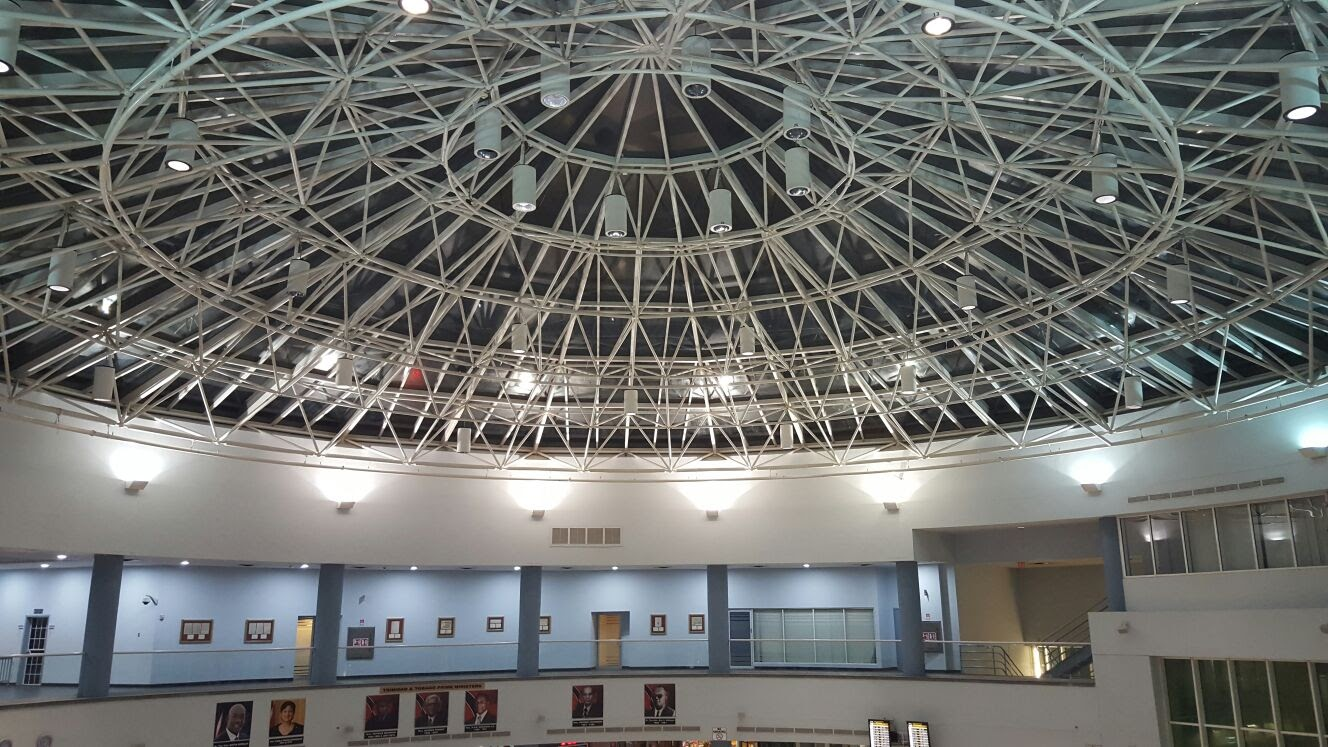
Main atrium

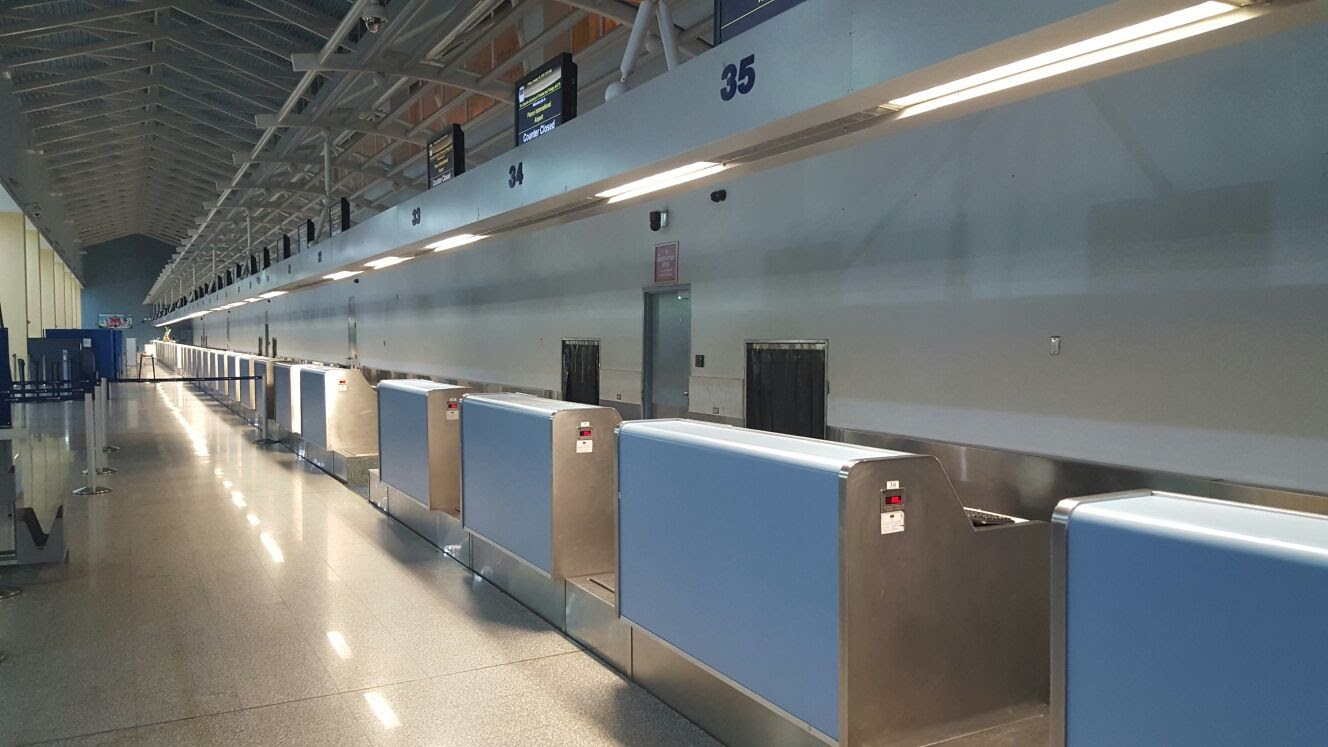
Check-in area

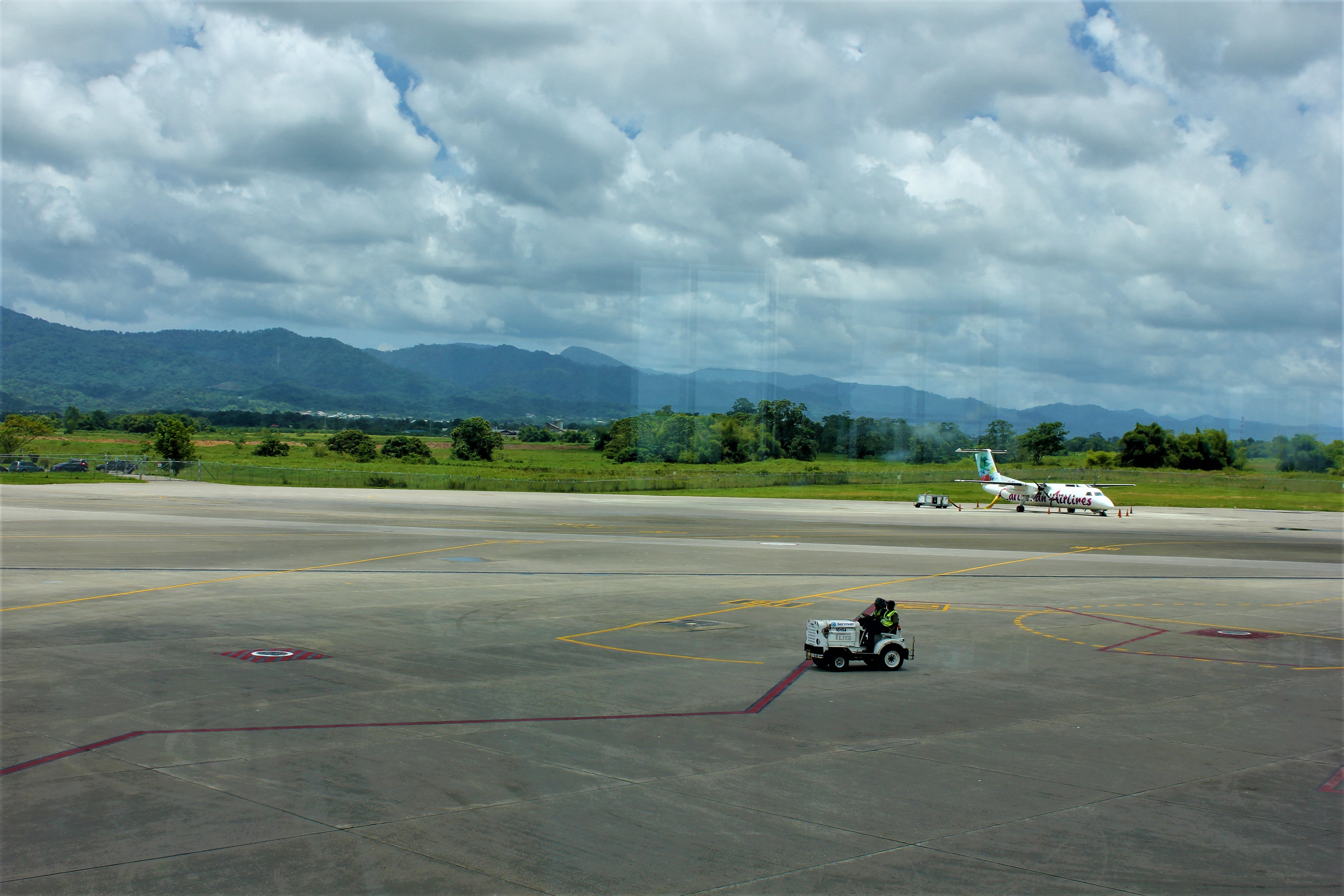
Piarco International Airport apron

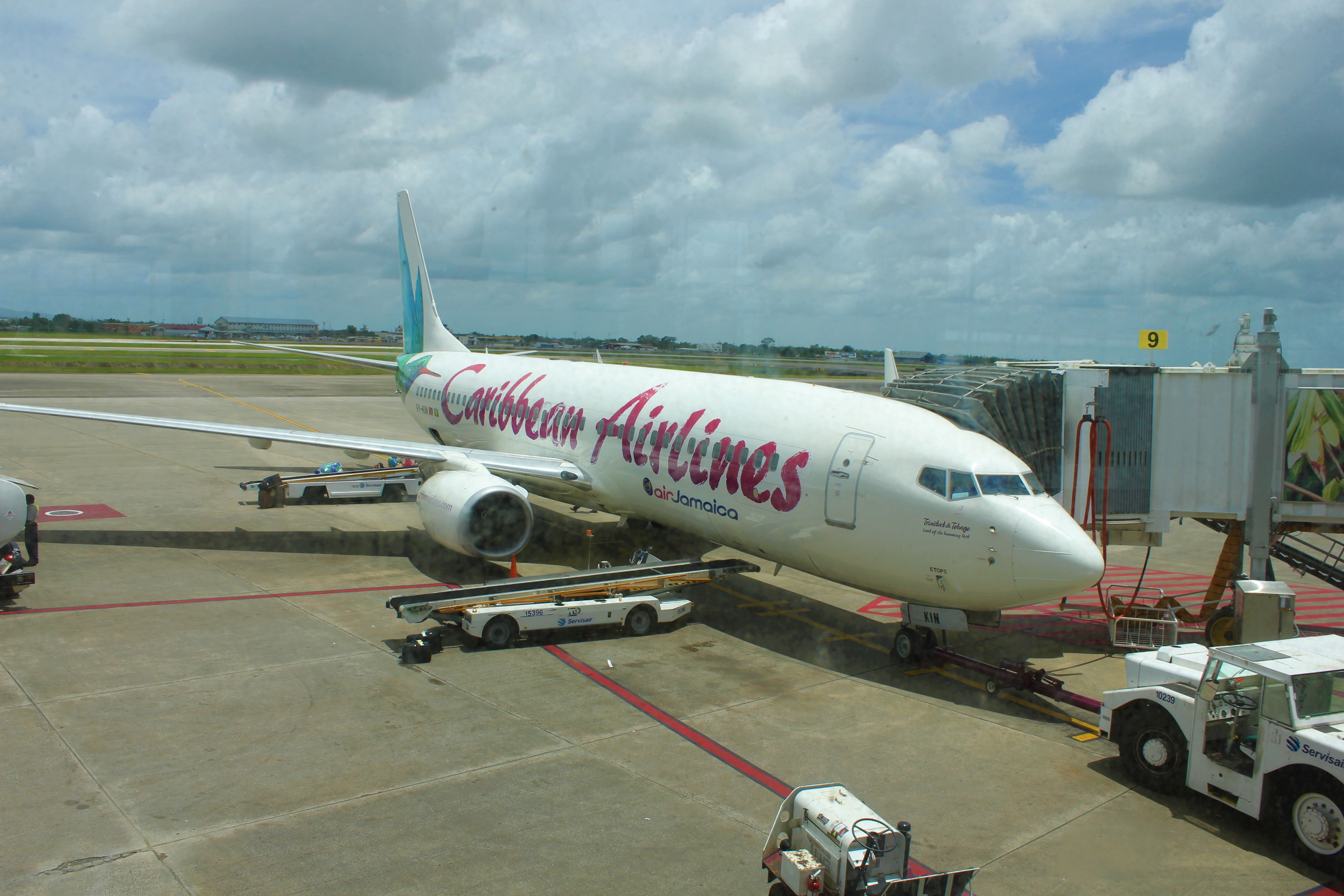
Caribbean Airlines jet at POS Airport

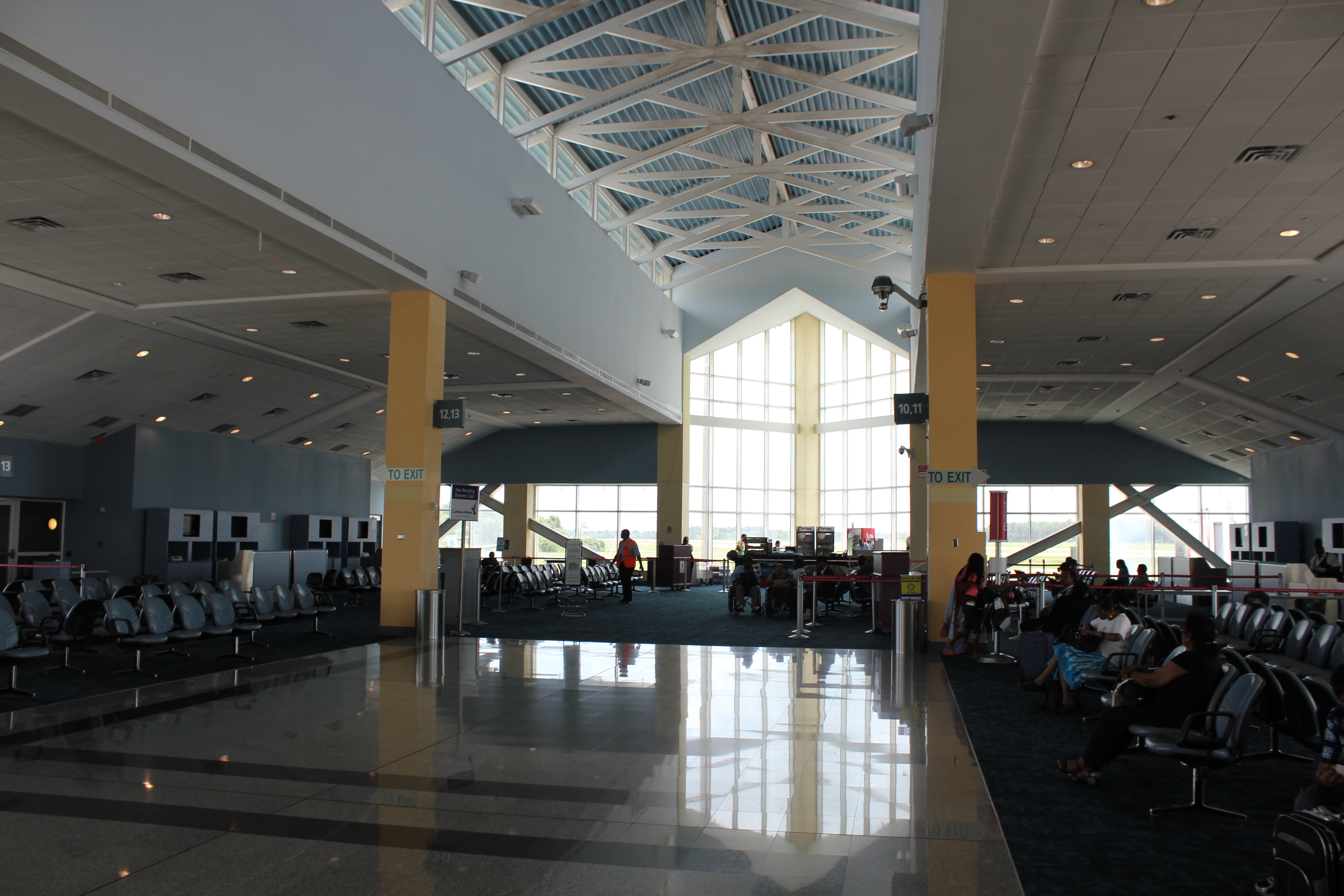
Inside POS boarding area

=== Operational facilities ===
At Piarco International Airport there are two high-speed taxiways and three connector taxiways (ICAO Code F for new large aircraft). The airport has 82 ticket counter positions that operate under SITA's fibre-optic C.U.T.E. system which exceeds the recommended standards of ICAO and IATA.

The terminal is equipped to process a peak-hour passenger traffic of 1,500 passengers.

An administrative/operations building for the Trinidad and Tobago Air Guard is being constructed at the Piarco Air Base.

The control tower at the old terminal building is currently used for air traffic control. The tower at the new terminal building is used for ramp control and runway movement control. A new control tower was opened in 2011.

With a 10,500ft (3,200m) runway, the airport is also large enough to accommodate most international widebody airliners such as the Boeing 777 and the Airbus A340, while also including small and medium sized aircraft such as the Boeing 737, Airbus A330, and DeHavilland Dash 8.

The airport layout consists of one main terminal building which includes three concourses. These concourses are not strictly identified as their name depicts but are divided into the following areas; Gates 1–7 serving all other airlines, Gates 8-14 serving Caribbean Airlines, and the Tobago concourse serving flights to Tobago.

The entrance of the Club Caribbean lounge is located at Gate 14. The VIP Flyers lounge is adjacent to Gate 1, just outside the atrium.

The Air Guard of Trinidad and Tobago is based at Piarco International Airport. During the existence of BWIA West Indies, its head office was on the airport property.

The disused south terminal has been renovated into a VIP terminal for the Summit of The Americas. The North terminal has also received additional remote parking stands. In November 2009, upgrades on the south terminal were completed and the area now serves as a private/executive jet facility for high-end travellers.

In 2022, the sod was turned for a $12M solar park at the airport.

=== Terminals ===
Piarco International Airport has two terminals. The south terminal was once the passenger terminal for the airport but has been renovated to serve as an executive terminal. It serves cargo flights, general aviation and helicopter flights. It has fourteen parking positions as well as light aircraft parking. In addition it has the Airports Administration Centre, the head office of the Airports Authority of Trinidad and Tobago. The north terminal is the main passenger terminal, handling all commercial passenger airline traffic and housing 29 gates which include 14 mechanical bridges.

In addition to passenger airlines, the airport also handles cargo traffic, general aviation, military, and helicopter flights.

==== North Terminal ====
The North Terminal is the main passenger terminal, completed in 2001 and opened on 25 May 2002, handling all commercial passenger airline traffic. It has a total of 14 jetway gates spread among two concourses, with a total of 29 parking positions spread among the three concourses.

The western concourse includes a VIP Lounge, four remote stands, and serves all international airlines through gates 1-7. Gates 8-14 form the eastern concourse serving all international Caribbean Airlines flights, as well as the location of the Club Caribbean lounge.

The two concourses together form the international departures section of the airport, with a duty free mall area and panoramic views of the airfield and the Northern Range. The rest of the North Terminal consists of the check-in hall, public atrium, arrivals hall, local food court and the Tobago concourse, just outside the check-in hall. The Tobago concourse strictly serves domestic flights to Tobago and does not require the same infrastructure as an international departure hall, which is why there are just 2 parking positions.

The check-in hall contains 82 ticket counter positions, where Caribbean Airlines occupies the eastern extreme desks and the western extreme desks (designated for Tobago), and all other airlines occupy the remaining counters. The public atrium has the largest glass dome in the Caribbean.

==== South Terminal ====
The south terminal, now converted into a 24-hour Cargo Facility, houses an Executive Jet Centre and helicopter operations. It also has offices for the Airport Administration Centre and the Airport Authority.

=== Ground transportation ===
The airport is served by the east-west Churchill-Roosevelt Highway which runs to the north of the airport, and connects to the airport circular via BWIA Boulevard. The airport is also accessible from the south via the Caroni South Bank Road, which connects to the north-south Uriah Butler Highway at Caroni.

The Public Transport Service Corporation runs an hourly service during the week providing a bus connection between the airport and City Gate, Port of Spain. From City Gate, passengers can transit onto a bus to their final destination. Privately run taxi services are also available at the airport with fixed fares.

Rental car services are also available at the airport's curbside arrivals hall, from both local and foreign rental companies. The airport contains a large ground-level car park with fixed daily, weekly and monthly fares, as well as secondary parking north of the existing car park on an unfinished roadway, to which shuttle services are provided.

=== Expansion ===
The airport underwent expansion and renovation works in preparation for the Commonwealth Heads of Government summit in November 2009 due to being "inadequate" for the influx of planes arriving for said summit.

More recently, numerous upgrades have been conducted at the airport, and more are planned. These include:

- Upgrades to atrium seating facilities
- Planned Four Points by Sheraton hotel

== Airlines and destinations ==
=== Passenger ===
The following airlines operate regular scheduled and charter flights to and from Trinidad:

Airlines	Destinations
Air Canada	Toronto–Pearson
American Airlines	Miami
British Airways	London–Gatwick
Caribbean Airlines	Antigua, Barbados, Caracas, Castries, Curaçao, Fort-de-France, Fort Lauderdale, Georgetown–Cheddi Jagan, Georgetown–Ogle, Grenada, Havana, Kingston–Norman Manley, Miami, Nassau, New York–JFK, Orlando, Paramaribo, Pointe-à-Pitre, St. Maarten, St. Vincent–Argyle, Tobago, Toronto–Pearson
Contour Airlines	Dominica–Douglas-Charles
Copa Airlines	Panama City–Tocumen
InterCaribbean Airways	Barbados
JetBlue	New York–JFK
KLM	Amsterdam, St. Maarten
LIAT20	Antigua
Rutaca Airlines	Porlamar
United Airlines	Houston–Intercontinental; Seasonal: Newark
Winair	St. Maarten

=== Cargo ===
Airlines	Destinations
Amerijet International	Miami

== Accidents and incidents ==
- 22 August 1942 – a Lockheed Model 14 Super Electra operated by KLM West-Indisch Bedrijf crashed shortly after takeoff, about 2 miles (3.2 km) miles from the airport, killing all 13 people on board.
- 5 January 1963 – A Cessna Skywagon carrying two Swedish persons, Torgny Sommelius (Pilot) and actor Erik Strandmark, crash landed and caught fire at Piarco, killing them.
- 28 November 1963 – a Convair CV-340 operated by Avensa was hijacked by six armed people shortly after taking off from Ciudad Bolívar, with the destination of Caracas. They forced the pilot to circle Ciudad Bolívar and ordered them to drop pamphlets urging the Venezuelan public to avoid voting in the upcoming elections. After that they demanded to be flown to Piarco, where they surrendered.
- 17 January 1990 – A male American tourist stripped himself, jumped a fence that led into the airport tarmac, then stole a car and crashed it into a British Airways Boeing 747. After being arrested, he managed to escape and he threw himself into the engine of the plane, resulting in his death.

== Awards ==
- 2006 – The "Caribbean's Leading Airport", by the World Travel Awards

== See also ==
- List of the busiest airports in the Caribbean
