= AATT =

AATT may refer to:

- Addison Airport Toll Tunnel, a tunneled road in Addison, Texas, US
- Airports Authority of Trinidad and Tobago, a government agency
