= 749 Naval Air Squadron =

Inactive flying squadron of the Royal Navy's Fleet Air Arm

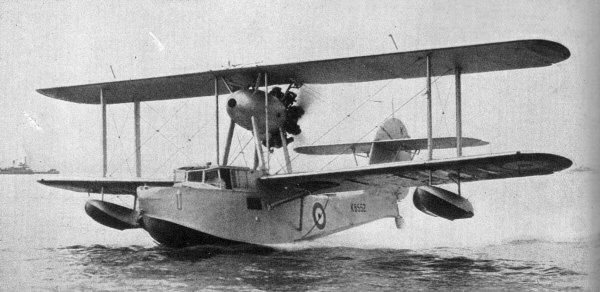
- Supermarine Walrus, of the type used by 749 NAS
- Active: 1941–1945
- Disbanded: 1 October 1945
- Country: United Kingdom
- Branch: Royal Navy
- Type: Fleet Air Arm Second Line Squadron
- Role: Observer Training Squadron
- Size: Squadron
- Part of: Fleet Air Arm
- Home station: RNAS Piarco (HMS Goshawk)

Insignia
- Identification Markings: W2QA+ & W2QAA+ (Walrus); W2A+ & W2AA+ (Goose); A1-A4 (Anson)

Aircraft flown
- Patrol: Supermarine Walrus
- Trainer: Grumman Goose; Avro Anson

749 Naval Air Squadron (749 NAS), sometimes referred to as 749 Squadron, is an inactive Fleet Air Arm (FAA) naval air squadron of the United Kingdom’s Royal Navy (RN). It was previously active from 1941 through to 1945, formed as an Observer Training Squadron, as part of No.1 Observer School at based at RNAS Piarco (HMS Goshawk), located 30 km (19 mi) east of Downtown Port of Spain, adjacent to the town of Piarco, on the island of Trinidad.

== History ==
=== Observer Training Squadron (1941–1945) ===
749 Naval Air Squadron formed at RNAS Piarco (HMS Goshawk), Trinidad, on 1 January 1941 as an Observer Training Squadron. The squadron's function, was the training of observers for the Fleet Air Arm and to achieve this, it was equipped with Supermarine Walrus, an amphibious maritime patrol aircraft and navigation training variant of the Grumman Goose amphibious aircraft. It formed part of the No. 1 Observer School, operating out of RNAS Piarco alongside two more Observer Training Squadrons: 750 Naval Air Squadron and 752 Naval Air Squadron, along with an Air Towed Target Unit, 793 Naval Air Squadron.

The ocean liner and a refrigerated cargo ship, SS Almeda Star, left Liverpool carrying within its passenger complement, 142 members of the Fleet Air Arm to RNAS Piarco, Trinidad. They consisted of 21 officers and 121 ratings from 749 Naval Air Squadron, 750 Naval Air Squadron and 752 Naval Air Squadron. On 17 January 1941 Almeda Star was about 35 nautical miles (65 km) north of Rockall when the German submarine U-96, commanded by Kptlt Heinrich Lehmann-Willenbrock, torpedoed her. All 360 people aboard were lost.

From 1942 the squadron was also tasked with anti-submarine patrols, depth charges and flares were provided to these flights, until 1944, when US Navy forces took on this responsibility.

749 Naval Air Squadron remained at RNAS Piarco for the duration of World War II, adding four Avro Anson multi-role training aircraft to its strength in 1954, however, it disbanded on 1 October 1945.

== Aircraft operated ==
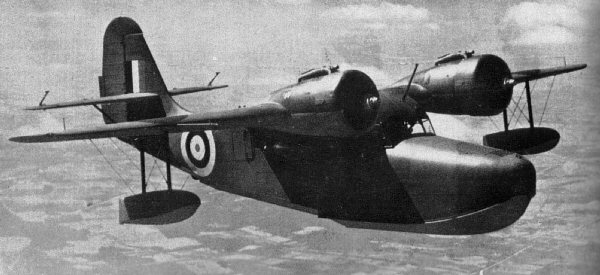
Grumman Goose

The squadron has operated three different aircraft types:

- Supermarine Walrus amphibious maritime patrol aircraft (January 1941 - October 1945)
- Grumman Goose Mk.IA amphibious navigation trainer aircraft (March 1942 – October 1945)
- Avro Anson I multi-role training aircraft (June 1945 - October 1945)

== Naval air stations ==
749 Naval Air Squadron operated from a single naval air station of the Royal Navy, located overseas in Trinidad:

- Royal Naval Air Station Piarco (HMS Goshawk), Trinidad, (1 January 1941 - 9 October 1945)
- disbanded - (9 October 1945)

== Commanding officers ==
List of commanding officers of 749 Naval Air Squadron with date of appointment:

- Lieutenant(A) J.C. Moore, RNVR, from 1 January 1941
- Lieutenant Commander(A) G.H. Winn, RNVR, from 1 December 1941
- Lieutenant commander(A) A.E. Worby, RNVR, from 7 April 1943
- Lieutenant commander(A) P.G. Lee, RNVR, from 1 August 1945
- disbanded - 9 October 1945

Note: Abbreviation (A) signifies Air Branch of the RN or RNVR.
