= Darby Brown =

Australian boxer (1929–1988)

Personal information
- Nationality: Australian
- Born: Leslie Brown; 24 April 1929 Sydney
- Died: 31 October 1988 (aged 59)
- Height: 5 ft 6 1/2 in (1.69 m)
- Weight: feather/light/welter/middleweight

Boxing career
- Reach: 65 in (165 cm)
- Stance: Orthodox

Boxing record
- Total fights: 63
- Wins: 38 (KO 25)
- Losses: 20 (KO 4)
- Draws: 4
- No contests: 1

Darby Brown (24 April 1929 – 31 October 1988) born Leslie Brown in Sydney was an Australian professional feather/light/welter/middleweight boxer of the 1940s and 1950s who won the Australian welterweight title, and British Empire welterweight title, his professional fighting weight varied from 126 lb (57 kg; 9 st 0 lb), i.e. featherweight to 149 1/4 lb (67.7 kg; 10 st 9.3 lb), i.e. middleweight. Darby Brown was managed by Jack Hourigan, and trained by Ray Horne, and Bob Urquhart. Darby Brown was inducted into the Australian National Boxing Hall of Fame in 2015 in the Veterans category.
