= Brian Janssen =

Australian boxer

Personal information
- Nationality: Australian
- Born: 10 August 1962 (age 64)
- Weight: light/light welter/welter/light middleweight

Boxing career
- Stance: Orthodox

Boxing record
- Total fights: 31
- Wins: 26 (KO 15)
- Losses: 3 (KO 2)
- Draws: 2

Brian Janssen (born 10 August 1962) is an Australian professional boxer of the 1980s who won the Queensland (Australia) State light welterweight title, Australian light welterweight title, Australian welterweight title, and Commonwealth welterweight title, his professional fighting weight varied from 135 lb (61 kg; 9 st 9 lb), i.e. lightweight to 148 3/4 lb (67.5 kg; 10 st 8.8 lb), i.e. light middleweight.

Janssen was inducted into the Australian National Boxing Hall of Fame in 2014 under the moderns category
