= Crusoe Cave =

Cave in Trinidad and Tobago

Crusoe Cave is a sea cave on Crown Point, on the island of Tobago in Trinidad and Tobago. The cave is named for the titular main character of the 1719 novel Robinson Crusoe by English writer Daniel Defoe. In the novel, Crusoe is shipwrecked on an unnamed island described as within sight of Trinidad; it is believed by some that Crusoe's island was based on Tobago. The cave has been referred to by this name since as early as 1890.

The cave can be visited on foot. It fills with water during high tide, and is therefore best viewed during low tide. There are some fossils found in the limestone of the cave. The land where the cave sits is privately owned, but can usually be accessed for a nominal fee.
