= Amerijet International =

American cargo airline

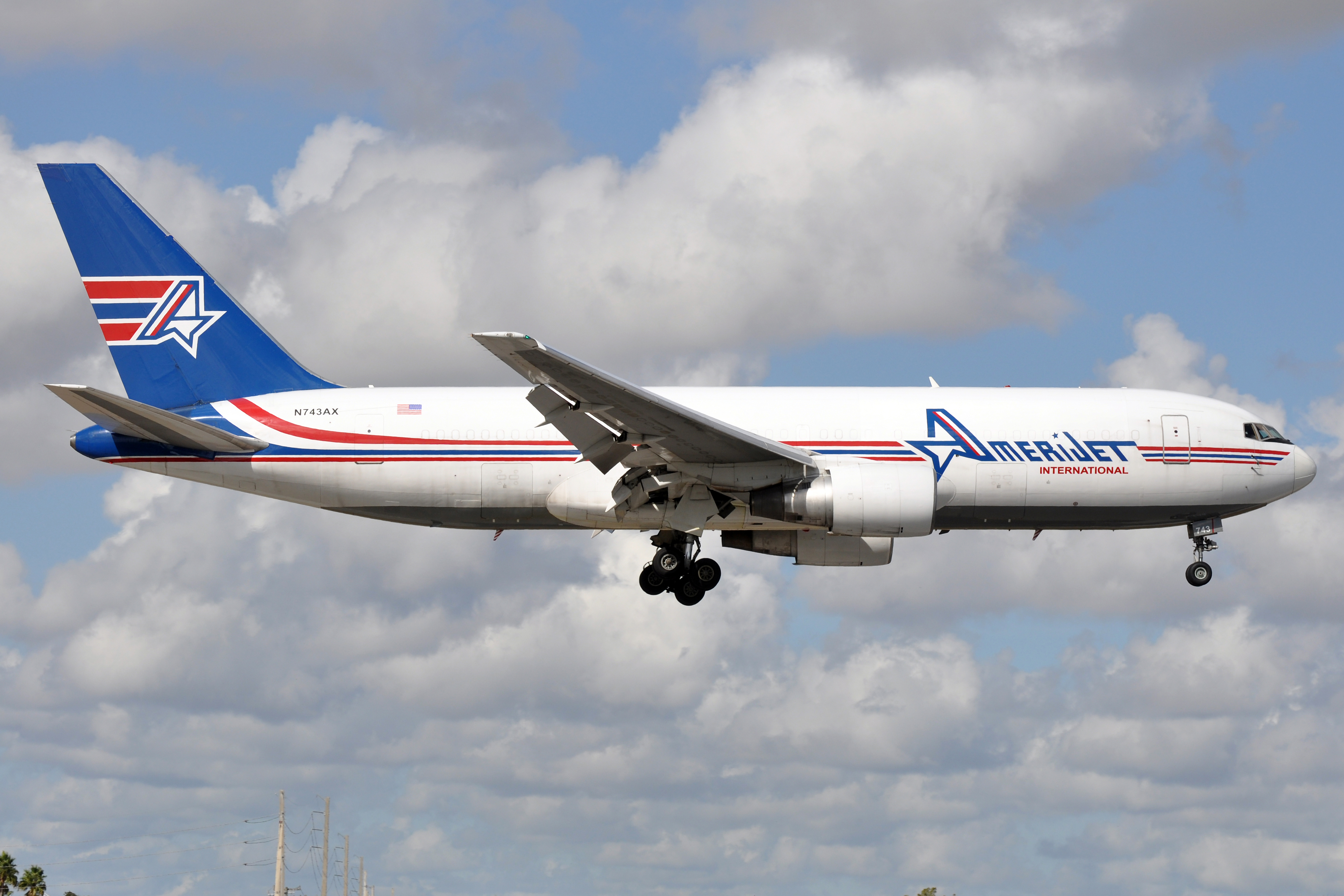
- An Amerijet Boeing 767-200
IATA	ICAO	Call sign
M6	AJT	AMERIJET
- Founded: 1974
- Commenced operations: 1978
- AOC #: PCSA059B
- Hubs: Miami International Airport; Piarco International Airport
- Fleet size: 10
- Destinations: 48
- Headquarters: Miami, Florida, United States
- Key people: Joe Mozzali (CEO)
- Website: amerijet.com

Amerijet International Airlines, Inc. is an American cargo airline headquartered in Miami, United States. The airline delivers air freight with its fleet of Boeing 767s from its main hub at the Miami International Airport to 48 destinations throughout the Caribbean, Mexico, Central and South America. Their network spans 476 destinations throughout the world, including Europe, Asia, the Americas, Africa, and the Middle East.

== History ==
The airline was established and started operations in 1974. The original name of the company was "Professional Charter Services." It was founded by David Bassett (Chairman and Chief Executive) and a partner with a leased Cessna 401, operating passenger and cargo services between the US and the Bahamas. In 1976, Amerijet became a freight only carrier. In late 1978, courier contracts were taken from Purolator, FedEx, UPS, DHL and Airborne Express in the early 1980s. In 1982, Bassett bought out his partner and created Amerijet International. The logo and name were created by Miami commercial artist, Michael I Rosenthal.

The main services that Amerijet offers are general cargo shipping, pharmaceutical shipping, perishable shipping, oversized load shipping, live animal transport, and charter services. Among their airfreight operation, Amerijet also provides trucking services, including expedited delivery. Throughout the Caribbean, Central and South America, Amerijet offers last mile delivery for commercial customers.

Amerijet has been a target internationally of animal rights activists for their transportation of animals for experimentation purposes in later years, particularly in conjunction with the Miami-based company Primate Products. Amerijet has been coming under increasing pressure in South Florida, with monthly demonstrations in front of its Fort Lauderdale office, and some of Amerijet's upper management have even been protested at their homes. To date, two activists have been arrested in front of Amerijet's office. On Valentine's Day 2011, Amerijet ended their involvement in the primate trade with these words, "Amerijet has ceased transporting primates for any and all purposes."

Amerijet operated under Chapter 11 bankruptcy protection from August 22 until December 31, 2001, from which it emerged after financial restructuring. Amerijet International was majority-owned by H.I.G. from 2001 to 2016. On July 26, 2016, H.I.G. Capital completed the sale of Amerijet, the Miami-based all-cargo carrier to private equity firm ZS Fund L.P. Amerijet's new CEO, Vicken L. Karjian joined the company in July 2016. Amerijet and the International Brotherhood of Teamsters reached an agreement on September 14, 2009, on a new four-year labor contract covering flight crew employees.

In July 2022, Maersk announced that they had reached a CMI agreement with Amerijet to operate three of their new Boeing 767-300 Freighters. Maersk will take delivery of three 767-300Fs from Boeing and outsource their operation to Amerijet. The aircraft were originally ordered by Longhao Airlines, but were never delivered to them. Maersk has said the aircraft would be used for trans-pacific flights.

In January 2024, Amerijet said it is returning six Boeing 757-200PCF freighters to lessors, laying off nonpilot personnel and securing $55 million in capital from existing lenders as part of a restructuring aimed at stabilizing faltering finances and operations. The company will also defer agreements to add additional Boeing 767 cargo jets to improve cash flow.

In March 2026, founder David Bassett died at age 77.

== Fleet ==
=== Current fleet ===
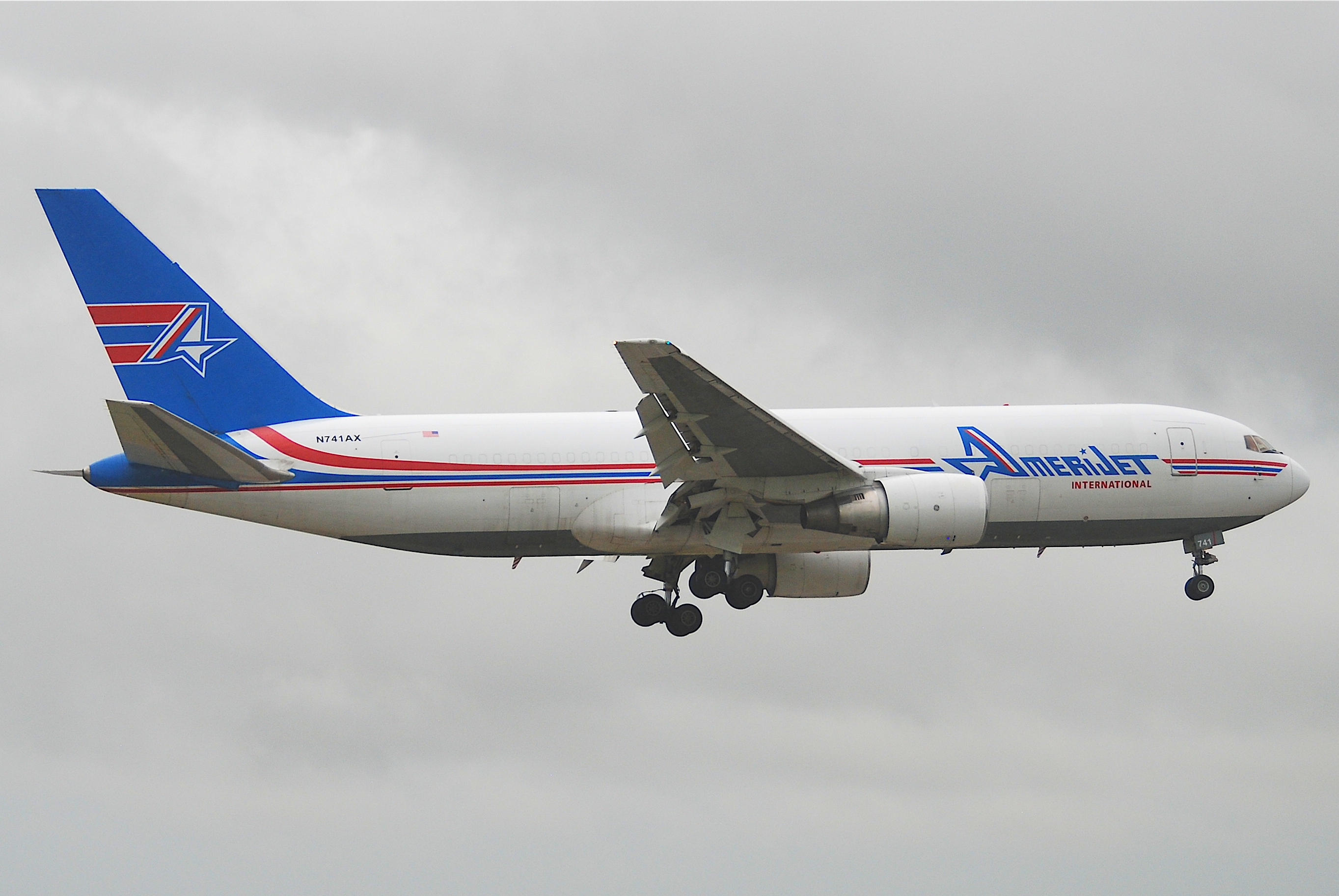
Amerijet Boeing 767-200BDSF, 2011

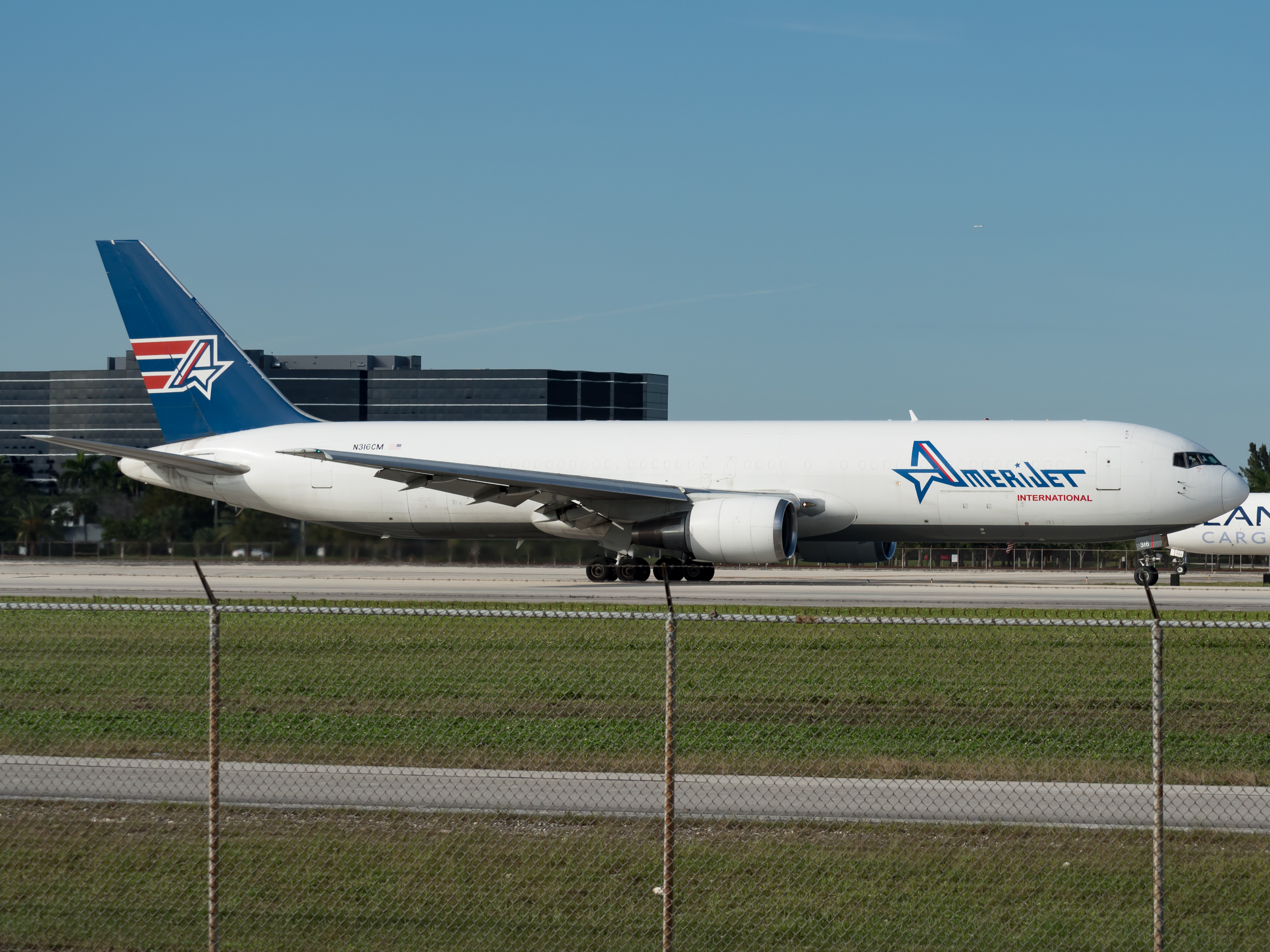
Amerijet Boeing 767-300ER/BDSF at Miami International Airport, 2016

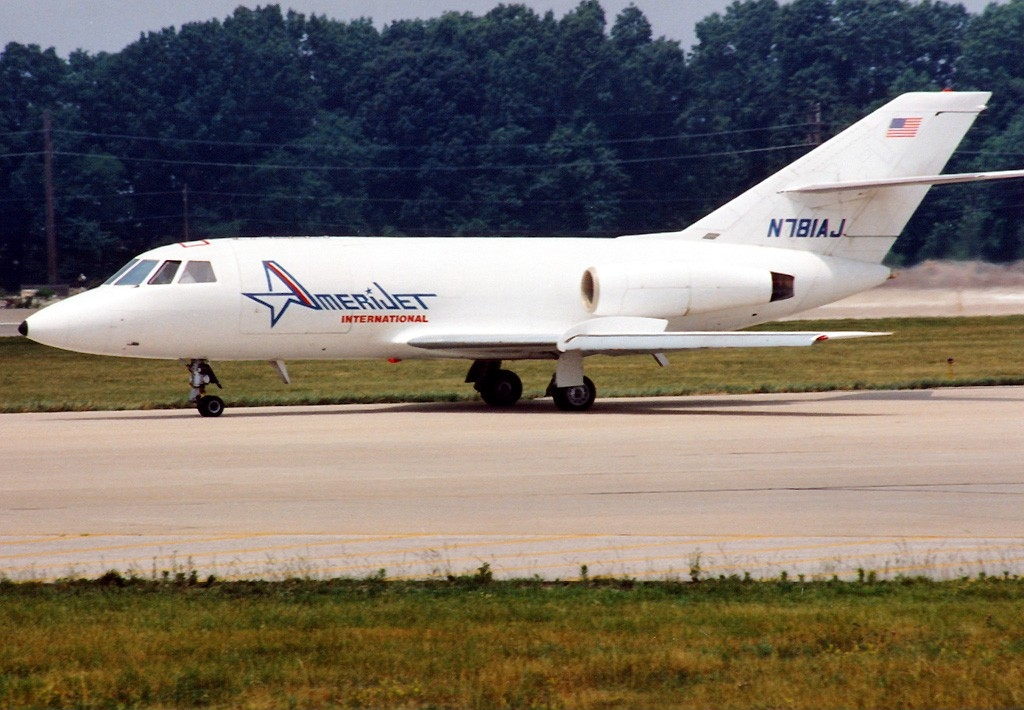
Dassault Falcon (Mystere) 20C

As of August 2025, Amerijet International operates the following aircraft:

Amerijet International fleet
Aircraft	In service	Orders	Notes
Boeing 767-200PCF	1	—	
Boeing 767-300ER/BCF	1	—	
Boeing 767-300ER/BDSF	8	—	
Total	10	—	

=== Former fleet ===
The airline operated the following aircraft:

Amerijet International former fleet
Aircraft	Total	Introduced	Retired	Notes
Airbus A321-200/P2F	2	2021	2022	Operated by Titan Airways.
Boeing 727-100F	11	1985	1998	
Boeing 727-200F	22	1989	2018	
Boeing 757-200PCF	6	2021	2024	Returned to their lessors.
Boeing 767-200BDSF	8	2010	2024	
Bombardier Challenger 601	1	2003	2004	
Cessna Citation I/SP	1	1987	2000	
Cessna 401A	1	1978	2005	
Dassault Falcon 20	9	1983	2001	
Learjet 35A	2	1999	2002	

== See also ==
- List of airlines of the United States
