= Yuh Hwan-kil =

South Korean boxer (1962–2009)

Personal information
- Nationality: South Korean
- Born: Yuh Hwan-kil; September 23, 1962 Namhae, Gyeongsangnam-do, South Korea
- Died: April 21, 2009 (aged 46) Goyang, Gyeonggi-do, South Korea
- Height: 5 ft 6 in (1.68 m)
- Weight: Featherweight; Junior-lightweight

Boxing career
- Stance: Southpaw

Boxing record
- Total fights: 31
- Wins: 26
- Win by KO: 11
- Losses: 2
- Draws: 3

Yuh Hwan-kil (Korean: 류환길; Hanja: 柳煥吉; September 23, 1962 – April 21, 2009) was a South Korean former professional boxer who has held the inaugural IBF junior-lightweight title between April 1984 to February 1985.

== Professional career ==
On December 6, 1981, he won the vacant OPBF featherweight title and defended it three times.

On April 22, 1984, Yuh won the inaugural IBF junior-lightweight champion with a split decision win over Rod Sequenan. He defended the belt once before losing it to Lester Ellis in 1985.

== Death ==
On April 21, 2009, he died after 3 years of being in a vegetative state. He had been injured in a hit and run accident.

== Professional boxing record ==
31 fights	26 wins	2 losses
By knockout	11	0
By decision	14	2
By disqualification	1	0
Draws	3	

No.	Result	Record	Opponent	Type	Round, time	Date	Location	Notes
31	Win	26–2–3	Moon Tae-Jin	PTS	10	Nov 17, 1985	Pohang City, South Korea	
30	Loss	25–2–3	Lester Ellis	SD	15	Feb 15, 1985	Melbourne, Australia	Lost IBF junior-lightweight title
29	Win	25–1–3	Sak Galaxy	KO	6 (15)	Sep 16, 1984	Pohang City, South Korea	Retained IBF junior-lightweight title
28	Win	24–1–3	Rod Sequenan	SD	15	Apr 22, 1984	Seoul, South Korea	Won inaugural IBF junior-lightweight title
27	Win	23–1–3	Eddy Camero	UD	10	Jan 29, 1984	Seoul, South Korea	
26	Win	22–1–3	Ray Tayaban	KO	7	Jul 24, 1983	Seoul, South Korea	
25	Win	21–1–3	Nugprachen Kiatkumchai	KO	6	Jan 30, 1983	Seoul, South Korea	
24	Win	20–1–3	Hideyuki Shikano	PTS	10	Dec 19, 1982	Seoul, South Korea	
23	Win	19–1–3	Davino Inocian	PTS	12	Aug 29, 1982	Seoul, South Korea	Retained vacant OPBF featherweight title
22	Win	18–1–3	Hwang Jung-Han	PTS	12	Jun 13, 1982	Seoul, South Korea	Retained vacant OPBF featherweight title
21	Win	17–1–3	Suvan Muagsurin	PTS	12	Apr 11, 1982	Seoul, South Korea	Retained vacant OPBF featherweight title
20	Win	16–1–3	Santi Donjadee	DQ	5	Jan 17, 1982	Seoul, South Korea	
19	Win	15–1–3	Hwang Jung-Han	PTS	12	Dec 6, 1981	Seoul, South Korea	Won vacant OPBF featherweight title
18	Win	14–1–3	Kolnyth Punyuth	PTS	10	Aug 9, 1981	Seoul, South Korea	
17	Win	13–1–3	Koichi Matsushima	KO	7 (10)	Jun 7, 1981	Seoul, South Korea	
16	Win	12–1–3	Deo Rabago	KO	2	Apr 26, 1981	Seoul, South Korea	
15	Win	11–1–3	Nugprachen Kiatkumchai	PTS	10	Feb 15, 1981	Seoul, South Korea	
14	Loss	10–1–3	Ahn Hyun	PTS	10	Dec 19, 1980	Seoul, South Korea	
13	Draw	10–0–3	Lee Yung-Pil	PTS	5 (10)	Nov 15, 1980	Seoul, South Korea	
12	Win	10–0–2	Yun Suk-Jong	PTS	10	Sep 13, 1980	Seoul, South Korea	
11	Win	9–0–2	Rasool Shakoor	PTS	8	Jul 10, 1980	Seoul, South Korea	
10	Draw	8–0–2	Kim Hyun	PTS	8	Mar 24, 1980	Sands Event Center, Bethlehem, Pennsylvania, U.S.	
9	Win	8–0–1	Chung Moon-Pyung	PTS	8	Feb 3, 1980	Seoul, South Korea	
8	Win	7–0–1	Choi Wan-chol	KO	4	Nov 8, 1979	Seoul, South Korea	
7	Draw	6–0–1	Kim Yong-Hwan	PTS	8	Sep 9, 1979	Seoul, South Korea	
6	Win	6–0	Chang Jung-Suk	KO	4	Aug 14, 1979	Seoul, South Korea	
5	Win	5–0	Lee Sung-Muk	KO	2	Jun 29, 1979	Seoul, South Korea	
4	Win	4–0	Kim Bok-Su	PTS	4	May 20, 1979	Seoul, South Korea	
3	Win	3–0	Kim Hung-Suk	KO	2	Apr 29, 1979	Seoul, South Korea	
2	Win	2–0	Lee Byung-Up	KO	1	Apr 21, 1979	Seoul, South Korea	
1	Win	1–0	Cho Yung-Bok	PTS	4	Mar 18, 1979	Busan, South Korea	

Preceded by Inaugural champion	IBF Super Featherweight Champion; April 22, 1984–February 15, 1985	Succeeded by Lester Ellis
