= Elley Bennett =

Australian boxer

Personal information
- Nationality: Australian
- Born: Elliot Bennett; 3 April 1924 Pialba, Queensland
- Died: 31 August 1981 (aged 57) Bundaberg, Queensland
- Weight: Bantamweight, Featherweight

Boxing career
- Stance: Orthodox

Boxing record
- Total fights: 59
- Wins: 44
- Win by KO: 40
- Losses: 13
- Draws: 0
- No contests: 2

Elliot "Elley" Bennett (1924–1981) was an Australian Aboriginal boxer. He was Australian champion in both the bantamweight and featherweight divisions.

In 2009, he was inducted into the Queensland Sport Hall of Fame.

Bennett was the 2005 Inductee for the Australian National Boxing Hall of Fame Veterans category.
