= Henry Nissen =

Australian boxer (born 1948)

Personal information
- Nationality: Australian
- Born: Henry Nissenbaum; 15 January 1948 (age 78) Belsen, Germany
- Weight: fly/bantam/featherweight

Boxing career
- Stance: Orthodox

Boxing record
- Total fights: 18
- Wins: 16 (KO 2)
- Losses: 2 (KO 1)

Henry Nissen OAM (born Henry Nissenbaum; 15 January 1948, in Belsen) is an Australian amateur flyweight and professional fly/bantam/featherweight boxer of the 1960s and '70s who as an amateur represented Australia and won the gold medal at flyweight in the boxing at the 1969 Maccabiah Games, and as a professional won the Australian flyweight title, and Commonwealth flyweight title, his professional fighting weight varied from 111 1/4 lb (50.5 kg; 7 st 13.3 lb), i.e. flyweight to 118 1/4 lb (53.6 kg; 8 st 6.3 lb), i.e. featherweight. He was inducted into the Australian National Boxing Hall of Fame in 2009. He currently works as a youth social worker, and is a founder of the Emerald Hill Mission.

== Genealogical information ==
Henry Nissen was born in the Officers' Headquarters in a Displaced persons camp, outside the former Bergen-Belsen concentration camp, and is the son of a Polish Jewish father and a Ukrainian Jewish mother, who met in the Soviet Union where they had fled to avoid the holocaust. He is the twin brother of the Australian amateur flyweight champion boxer, Leon Nissen, of the Nissenbaum family, who migrated to Australia in 1949.
