= Ken Salisbury =

English/Australian boxer

Personal information
- Nickname: Kenny Holden (Mother's maiden name)
- Nationality: English/Australian
- Born: Kenneth E. Salisbury; 22 August 1953 (age 73) Liverpool
- Weight: light middle/middle/light heavyweight

Boxing career
- Stance: Orthodox

Boxing record
- Total fights: 32
- Wins: 30 (KO 9)
- Losses: 1 (KO 1)
- Draws: 1

Ken Salisbury (born 22 August 1953 in Liverpool) is an English/Australian professional light middle/middle/light heavyweight boxer of the 1970s and '80s who won the New South Wales (Australia) State light middleweight title, Australian light middleweight title, and Commonwealth light middleweight title, his professional fighting weight varied from 151 lb (68 kg; 10 st 11 lb), i.e. light middleweight to 161 1/4 lb (73.1 kg; 11 st 7.3 lb), i.e. light heavyweight.

Salisbury was the 2016 Inductee for the Australian National Boxing Hall of Fame Moderns category.

Salisbury started boxing at the age of nine, and represented England three times. In his twenties, he emigrated to Australia and became a professional boxer at age 25. His most famous fight took place at the Sydney Opera House, where he fought against Alex Temelkov in a fight that was later nicknamed "World War Three" after turning into a brawl. This ended up being the first and last fight that ever took place at the Sydney Opera House.

== Genealogical information ==
Ken Salisbury is the son of Edward Salisbury and Margaret (née Holden), and older brother of Paul Salisbury.
