= Chacachacare Lighthouse =

Lighthouse in Trinidad and Tobago

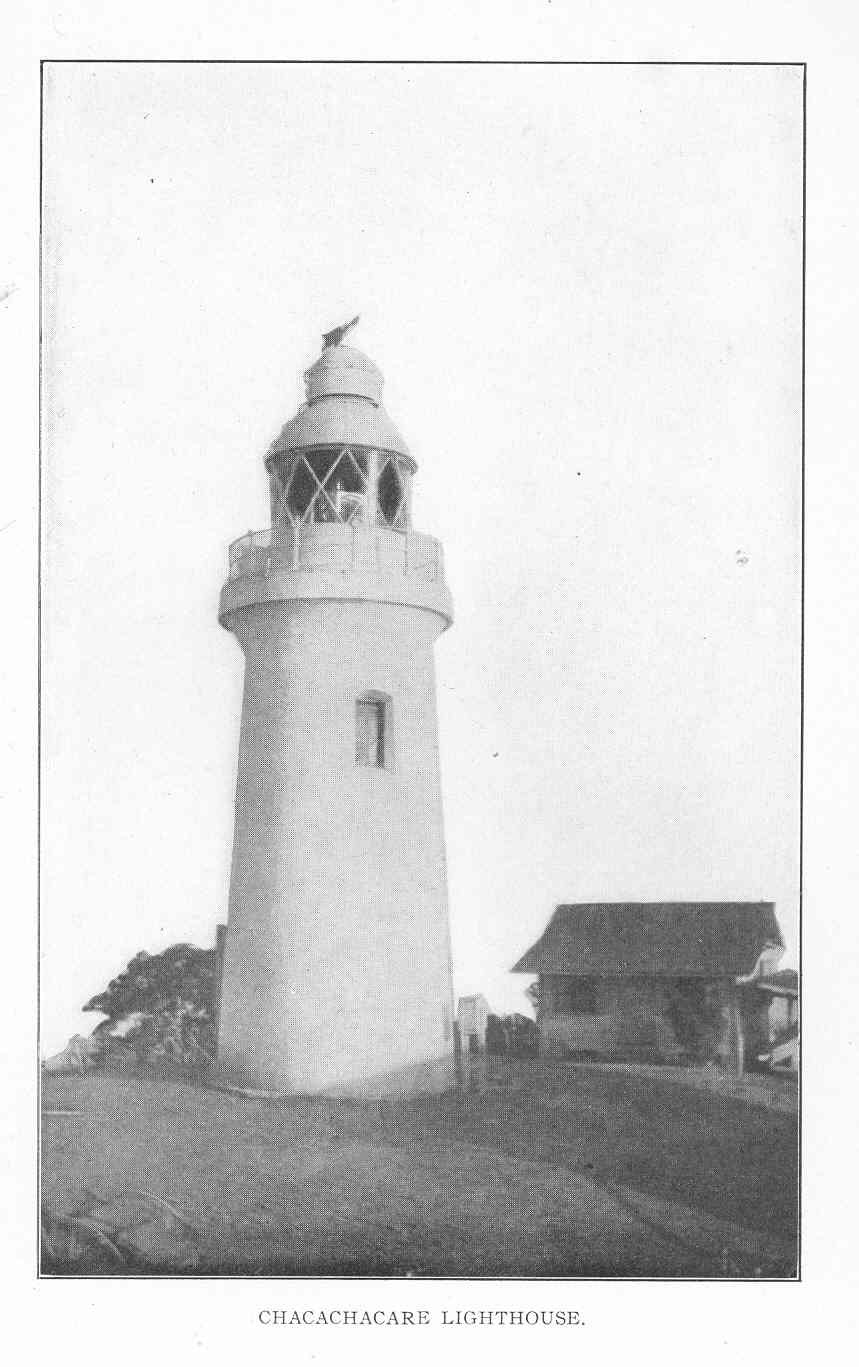
- Chacachacare Lighthouse in 1910
- Location: Chacachacare; Trinidad and Tobago
- Coordinates: 10°41′56.6″N 61°45′09.6″W

Tower
- Constructed: 1897
- Construction: masonry tower
- Height: 15 metres (49 ft)
- Shape: cylindrical tower with balcony and lantern
- Markings: white tower, red lantern
- Power source: mains electricity
- Operator: Chaguaramas National Park

Light
- Focal height: 251 metres (823 ft)
- Range: 26 nautical miles (48 km; 30 mi)
- Characteristic: Fl W 10s.

Chacachacare Lighthouse was an active lighthouse located on a hill in the northern part of Chacachacare Island, at an elevation of 236 metres (774 ft). The tower, built in 1897, with masonry, has a cylindrical shape with a balcony and lantern, positioned at a height of 251 metres (823 ft) above sea level. The tower is painted white and has a height of 15 metres (49 ft), the lantern is painted red. During its operational period, it emitted one white flash every ten seconds, visible up to 26 nautical miles (48 km; 30 mi).

== See also ==
- List of lighthouses in Trinidad and Tobago
