= Crown Point, Tobago =

Crown Point
- Town
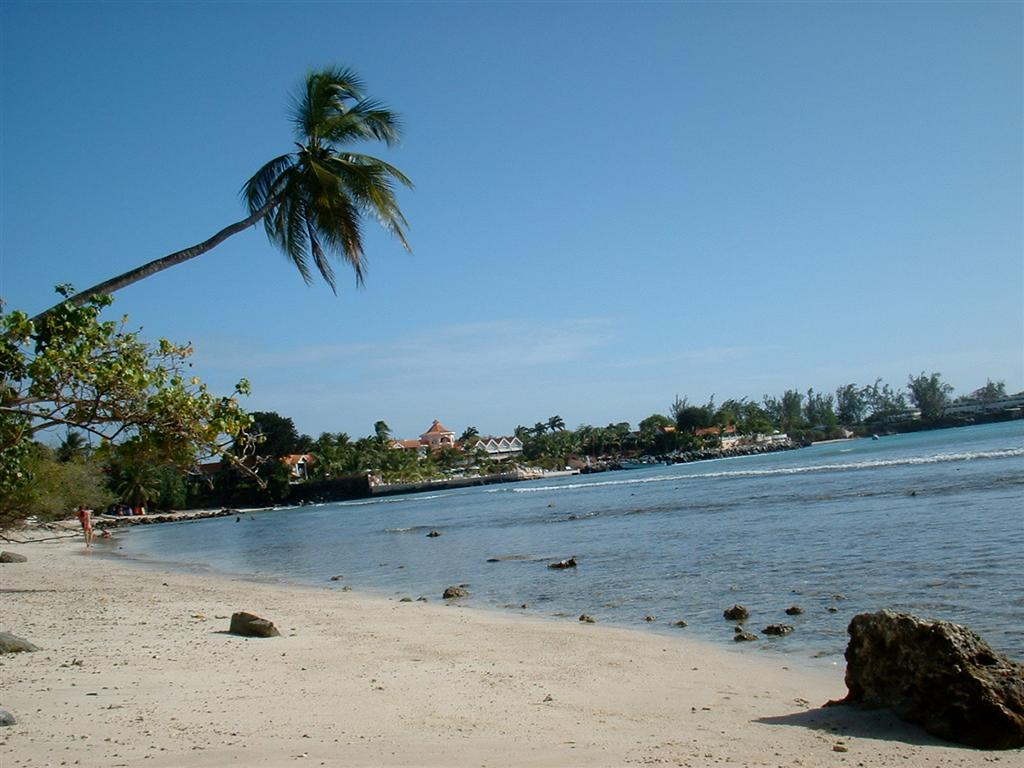
- A beach in Crown Point

- Location within Trinidad and Tobago
- Coordinates: 11°08′59″N 60°49′56″W
- Country: Trinidad and Tobago
- Ward: Tobago
- Parish: St. Patrick

Population (2011)
  - Total: 554

Crown Point is a town in southwestern Tobago, Trinidad and Tobago. It contains the A.N.R. Robinson International Airport which was formerly known as the Crown Point International Airport. It is near Store Bay, Buccoo Reef, and Pigeon Point. Crusoe Cave is located nearby.

== History ==
The name component "Crown" does not derive from the English word "crown", but from the Englisch word "couronian", referring to the Duchy of Courland and Semigallia that ruled over Tobago in the late 17th century.

== Lighthouse ==
Crown Point Lighthouse is an active lighthouse located in Scarborough, on the south west extremity of Tobago in the nearby the airport. The lighthouse consist of a square metal tower with gallery and lantern 26 metres (85 ft) high and has a focal height of 35 metres (115 ft). It is powered by solar unit and emits an alternating group of four white flashing repeated every 20 seconds visible up to 16 nautical miles (30 km; 18 mi).

== See also ==
- List of lighthouses in Trinidad and Tobago
