= ICAO code =

ICAO code may refer to:

- ICAO airport code, a four-character alphanumeric code designating each airport
- ICAO airline designator, a three-letter code designating each airline
- ICAO aircraft type designator, a three- or four-character alphanumeric code designating every aircraft type (and some sub-types) that may appear in flight planning
- ICAO aircraft marshalling signals, visual signalling between ground personnel and pilots on an airport, aircraft carrier or helipad
- ICAO 24-bit address, allocation of 24 bit addresses to states to uniquely identify aircraft worldwide
- ICAO altitude code a.k.a. Gillham code, an encoding used in older aircraft to report altitudes
