= Lennox Blackmoore =

Guyanese boxer

Personal information
- Nationality: Guyanese
- Born: Lennox Blackmoore; 10 July 1950 (age 76) Guyana
- Height: 5 ft 9 1/2 in (1.77 m)
- Weight: light/light welter/welter/light middle/middleweight

Boxing career
- Reach: 75 in (191 cm)
- Stance: Orthodox

Boxing record
- Total fights: 30
- Wins: 25
- Win by KO: 14
- Losses: 5

Lennox Blackmoore (born July 10, 1950) is a Guyanese professional light/light welter/welter/light middle/middleweight boxer of the 1970s and 80s.

His professional fighting weight varied from 132 lb (60 kg; 9 st 6 lb), i.e. lightweight to 156 lb (71 kg; 11 st 2 lb), i.e. middleweight. Lennox Blackmoore is the uncle of the boxer Shaun George.

Growing up in East La Penitence, his main interest was football. His first and only amateur bout was in 1971, and he began his professional career at 23 in 1974. He went on to win the Guyanese lightweight title and Guyanese light middleweight title. At 27, he won the 1977 Commonwealth lightweight title in Lagos, and upon his return to Guyana he was celebrated by the Forbes Burnham government. He was a challenger for the World Boxing Association (WBA) World light welterweight title against Aaron Pryor, and World Boxing Council (WBC) FECARBOX light welterweight title against Antonio Cervantes. Blackmoore also fought, and lost to, Steve Hearon.

He retired from boxing in 1986, and went on to train other boxers, including Julio César Green, Jill Matthews, and Åsa Sandell. He works as a private boxing trainer in New York city.

The Guyana Boxing Association (GBA) inaugurated the Lennox Blackmoore Intermediate Championships in 2015. GBA honors notable local boxers by naming tournaments after them.
