= Piarco =

- Town
- Location
- Coordinates: 10°35′N 061°20′W
- Country: Trinidad and Tobago
- Region: Tunapuna–Piarco
- Elevation: 58 ft (18 m)
- Ranked
- Time zone: UTC−4 (AST)
- Area code: +1 (868)-669

Piarco is a town in Trinidad and Tobago. It is situated in the north of the island of Trinidad and is the site of the country's main airport, Piarco International Airport, and area control centre for enroute air traffic over Trinidad and Tobago and as far north as Antigua and Barbuda and Saint Kitts and Nevis.

== Geography ==
Piarco is the site of one of the few natural savannas in Trinidad and Tobago, the Piarco Savanna. Most of this savanna land has been incorporated into the airport.

Piarco is bounded by Orange Grove to the west, Trincity/Maloney to the north and Mausica to the east. Piarco comprises a few areas/villages such as Oropune, Golden Grove and St Helena.

== Administration ==
Piarco, which is located south of Trincity and Tunapuna, is administered by the Tunapuna–Piarco Regional Corporation.

== Economy ==
Caribbean Airlines has its headquarters in the Iere House, Golden Grove Road Piarco. Prior to the establishment of Caribbean Airlines, BWIA West Indies Airways was headquartered on the airport property in Piarco.

The Airports Authority of Trinidad and Tobago has its headquarters in the Airports Administration Centre, in the South Terminal of the airport.
