= Charkey Ramon =

Australian boxer

Personal information
- Nationality: Australian
- Born: Dave Bruce Ballard Gulgong, NSW, Australia
- Weight: welter/light middle/middle/light heavyweight

Boxing career
- Stance: Orthodox

Boxing record
- Total fights: 35
- Wins: 33 (KO 21)
- Losses: 1 (KO 0)
- Draws: 1

Dave Bruce Ballard, known professionally as Charkey Ramon, is a retired Australian professional welter/light middle/middle/light heavyweight boxer.

== Early life and education ==
Dave Bruce Ballard was born in Gulgong, New South Wales.

== Career ==
Ballard was professionally known in his boxing career as Charkey Ramon. He was managed and trained by Bernie Hall.

In the 1970s, he boxed in the welter, light middle, middle, and light heavyweight categories. His professional fighting weight varied from 147 lb (67 kg; 10 st 7 lb), i.e. welterweight to 175 lb (79 kg; 12 st 7 lb), i.e. light heavyweight.

He later became a referee.

== Professional boxing record ==
Ramon won the Australian light middleweight title, and inaugural Commonwealth light middleweight title.

== Honours ==
Ballard was inducted into the Australian National Boxing Hall of Fame in 2008.
