= Airports Authority of Trinidad and Tobago =

- Headquarters: Piarco International Airport, Tunapuna–Piarco
- Number of locations: 2 airports
- Area served: Trinidad and Tobago
- Services: Airport operator
- Website: http://www.tntairports.com/

The Airports Authority of Trinidad and Tobago (AATT) is a government airport management agency of Trinidad and Tobago headquartered in the Airports Administration Centre in the South Terminal of Piarco International Airport in Piarco, Tunapuna–Piarco, Trinidad. The AATT manages the Piarco International Airport and the Arthur Napoleon Raymond Robinson International Airport (formerly Crown Point Airport). It was established in 1979 under the Airport Authorities Act, No. 49.
