= A. N. R. Robinson International Airport =

Airport in Trinidad and Tobago

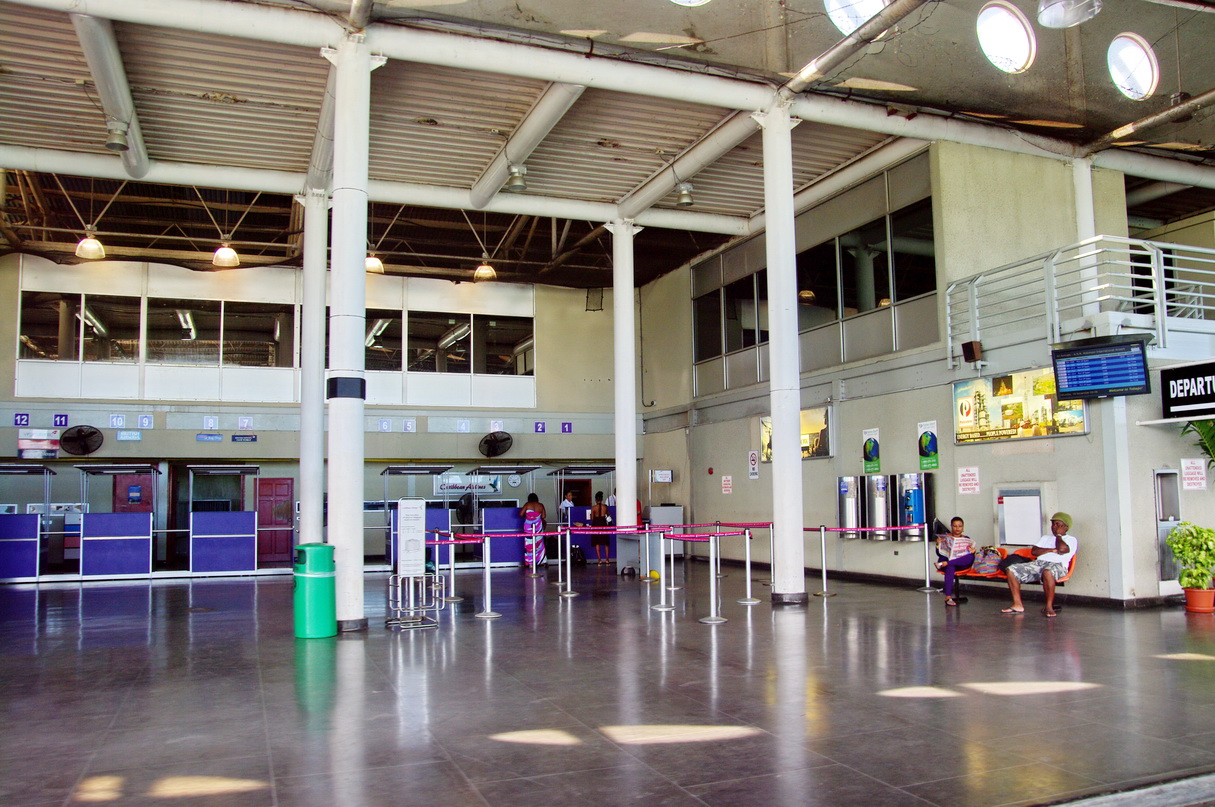
- IATA: TAB; ICAO: TTCP

Summary
- Airport type: Public
- Owner: Government of Trinidad and Tobago
- Operator: Airports Authority of Trinidad and Tobago
- Serves: Tobago
- Location: Crown Point, Tobago, Trinidad and Tobago
- Opened: December 1940; 85 years ago
- Elevation AMSL: 38 ft (12 m)
- Coordinates: 11°08′59″N 060°49′56″W
- Website: www.tntairports.com

Map
- Location in Trinidad and Tobago

Runways
Direction	Length		Surface
Direction	m	ft	Surface
11/29	2,744	9,003	Asphalt

Statistics (2015)
- International: 43,749
- Domestic: 695,873
- Total: 739,622
- Source: Aerodrome charts

A. N. R. Robinson International Airport (IATA: TAB, ICAO: TTCP) — formerly Crown Point International Airport — is an international airport located in Crown Point, Tobago in Trinidad and Tobago. It is located in the southwesternmost part of the island, near the town of Bon Accord, and 11 km (6.8 mi) from the capital, Scarborough. The airport is one of two international airports serving the twin isle republic of Trinidad and Tobago. The other airport is located on the island of Trinidad, Piarco International Airport.

== History ==
A. N. R. Robinson International Airport is situated on the southwestern tip of the island of Tobago. This airport is located within walking distance of some of several of the island's beaches. The airport was commissioned in December 1940 when the Works Department laid a 670 metres (2,200 ft) landing strip.

The facilities at Crown Point were upgraded in the mid-1980s to accommodate a new terminal building, access roads, and extended apron. Further developments were commenced in 1987 and completed in 1992 to accommodate wide-bodied aircraft such as the Boeing 747. Another development program was scheduled to commence in 2011, anticipated to include an extension of the terminal building, runway works and the addition of jet bridges to the structure.

On 19 May 2011, the airport was renamed after the Tobago-born third President and Prime Minister of Trinidad and Tobago, A. N. R. Robinson. In 2011, according to Trinidad Express, Tobago has recorded a 60% decrease in tourist arrivals, calling into question the practicality of the government's plan to further expand the airport.

== Airlines and destinations ==
The following airlines operate regular scheduled and charter flights to and from Tobago:

Airlines	Destinations
British Airways	Seasonal: Barbados
Caribbean Airlines	Barbados, New York–JFK, Port of Spain, Toronto–Pearson
Condor	Seasonal: Frankfurt

== See also ==
- List of the busiest airports in the Caribbean
