= Barry Michael =

Australian boxer

Personal information
- Nickname: Barry Michael
- Nationality: (Australia) Australian
- Born: Barry Michael Swettenham; 2 June 1955 (age 71) Watford, England
- Weight: Super Featherweight

Boxing career
- Stance: Orthodox

Boxing record
- Total fights: 60
- Wins: 48
- Win by KO: 15
- Losses: 9
- Draws: 3
- No contests: 0

Barry Michael (born 2 June 1955) is an Australian former boxer. He was in his prime during the 1980s and is best remembered for his 1985 fight against Lester Ellis, which received nationwide television coverage in Australia.

== Early life ==
Michael was born on 2 June 1955 in England and his family migrated to Australia in 1957. He grew up in Williamstown and dropped his surname Swettenham.

== Professional career ==
Michael won the IBF super featherweight title on 12 July 1985 over Lester Ellis. He made his first defense three months later on 19 October 1985 with a 4th-round TKO win over Korean Jin-Shik Choi at the Darwin Oval in the Northern Territory. The 25-year-old Choi had a record of 17-1 (15) going into the fight and had won eight straight. Jin-Shik Choi's only loss going into the fight was to Rod Sequenan (Ellis' first defense), two years earlier by 12th-round knockout.

== Later career ==
Michael ran for the Senate in 2013, representing the Palmer United Party.

Today, Michael is a boxing analyst in the media and appears on SEN 1116 as well as writing for the Herald Sun.

== Bibliography ==
- The Last Man Standing: The Barry Michael Story. Melbourne: New Holland Publishers. 2025. ISBN 9781760798406.

Sporting positions
Regional boxing titles
| Preceded by Billy Mulholland | Australian Lightweight Champion; 12 August 1978 – 12 July 1985; Vacated | Vacant Title next held by Dale Artango |
| Preceded by Langton Tinago | Commonwealth Lightweight Champion; 6 May 1981 – 22 July 1982 | Succeeded by Claude Noel |
| Preceded by Graeme Brooke | Commonwealth Lightweight Champion; 22 February – 12 July 1985; Vacated | Vacant Title next held by Langton Tinago |
World boxing titles
| Preceded by Lester Ellis | IBF Super Featherweight Champion; 12 July 1985 – 9 August 1987 | Succeeded by Rocky Lockridge |
