= Scarborough, Trinidad and Tobago =

Scarborough
- Town
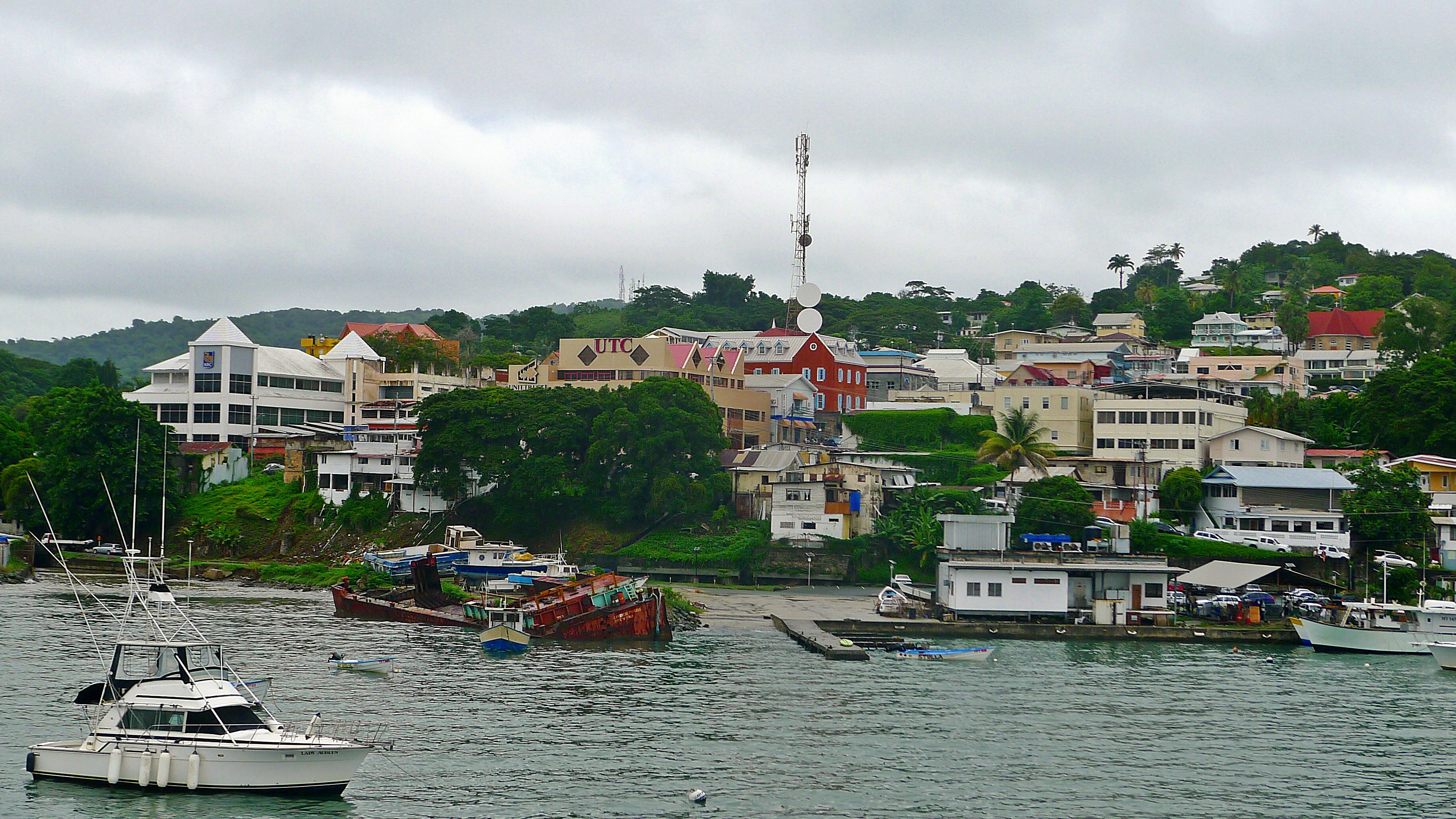
- Port of Scarborough

- Location within Trinidad and Tobago Location within the Caribbean Location within North America
- Coordinates: 11°11′0″N 60°44′15″W
- Country: Trinidad and Tobago
- Ward: Tobago
- Parish: Saint Andrew
- Settled: 1654
- Named for: Scarborough, England

Area
  - Total: 10 km^{2} (3.9 sq mi)
- Elevation: 4 m (13 ft)

Population (2011 census)
  - Total: 17,537
  - Rank: 11th
  - Density: 1,754/km^{2} (4,540/sq mi)
- Time zone: UTC-4 (AST)
- Postal Code: 90xxxx
- Area code: 868

Scarborough is a major town of the island of Tobago as well as the eleventh-most-populous in Trinidad and Tobago. Scarborough was the capital of Tobago in 1769 before it was unified with Trinidad changing the capital to Port of Spain. Situated in western Tobago, Scarborough is the economic and cultural centre of the island of Tobago. The estimated population in 2011 was 17,537. Scarborough is ranked as one of Trinidad and Tobago's most densely populated towns alongside Port of Spain, San Fernando, Chaguanas and Arima. The town's skyline is dominated by Fort King George, an 18th-century fortification named after King George III, which now hosts a historic and archaeologic museum. Scarborough's deepwater harbour was built in 1991; before that ships were forced to anchor offshore.

== Facilities ==
Shaw Park Cultural Complex is the largest performing arts theatre in the Caribbean. The facility has a capacity in its main hall of over 5000 as well as a conference and lecture halls. It hosted the Fast5 Netball at the 2023 Commonwealth Youth Games. The town has a library completed in 2012, and Scarborough General Hospital was completed in 2014.

== Suburbs ==
- Bacolet
- Bethel
- Carnbee
- Lambeau
- Signal Hill
- Orange Hill
- Patience Hill
- Providence
- Roselle
- Mount Saint George
- Lowlands
- Calder Hall

== History ==
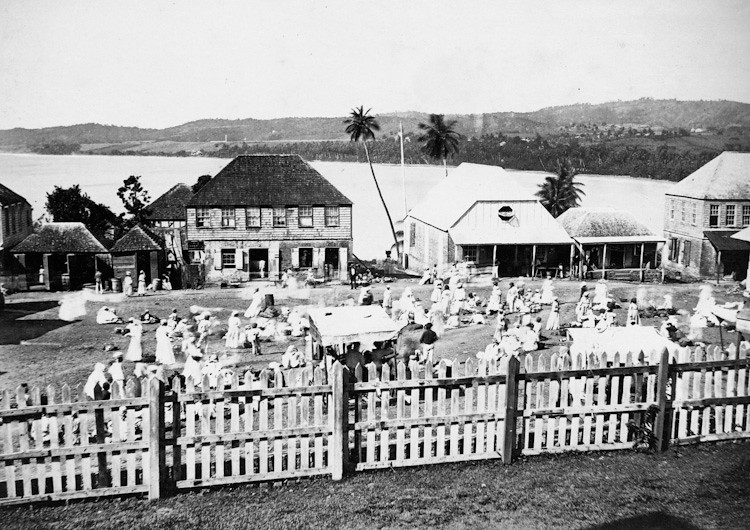
Scarborough market, ca. 1880

Scarborough became the capital of Tobago in 1769 when it replaced the then-capital of Georgetown. Under French rule it was named Port-Louis from 1789 to 1814. The town of Scarborough serves as the main seat of the Tobago House of Assembly, which is responsible for local governance in Tobago.

== Transportation ==
A ferry service links Scarborough with Port of Spain, Trinidad. Like the rest of the island of Tobago, Scarborough is served by the A.N.R. Robinson International Airport (formerly Crown Point Airport) located in Crown Point which is located 11 km from Downtown Scarborough. Scarborough is also served by the Claude Noel Highway.

== Namesake ==
The town is named after Scarborough in Yorkshire, United Kingdom.

== Geography ==
Scarborough is located in the southwestern part of Tobago.

=== Climate ===
The area has a relatively rare Köppen Climate Classification subtype of Am.

Climate data for Scarborough (1961–1990)
Month	Jan	Feb	Mar	Apr	May	Jun	Jul	Aug	Sep	Oct	Nov	Dec	Year
Mean daily maximum °C (°F)	29.5 (85.1)	30.0 (86.0)	30.4 (86.7)	31.0 (87.8)	31.2 (88.2)	30.6 (87.1)	30.2 (86.4)	30.3 (86.5)	30.7 (87.3)	30.5 (86.9)	30.1 (86.2)	29.5 (85.1)	30.3 (86.6)
Daily mean °C (°F)	25.9 (78.6)	26.1 (79.0)	26.6 (79.9)	27.4 (81.3)	27.8 (82.0)	27.4 (81.3)	27.0 (80.6)	27.1 (80.8)	27.3 (81.1)	27.1 (80.8)	26.8 (80.2)	26.2 (79.2)	26.9 (80.4)
Mean daily minimum °C (°F)	22.2 (72.0)	22.2 (72.0)	22.8 (73.0)	23.8 (74.8)	24.3 (75.7)	24.2 (75.6)	23.8 (74.8)	23.9 (75.0)	23.8 (74.8)	23.7 (74.7)	23.4 (74.1)	22.8 (73.0)	23.4 (74.1)
Average rainfall mm (inches)	47.4 (1.87)	47.9 (1.89)	42.8 (1.69)	44.8 (1.76)	63.8 (2.51)	148.4 (5.84)	187.7 (7.39)	162.7 (6.41)	171.3 (6.74)	220.3 (8.67)	206.7 (8.14)	158.9 (6.26)	1,502.7 (59.17)
Average rainy days	10	6	5	6	9	16	17	15	14	16	16	12	142
Source: WMO
