= Lester Ellis =

Australian boxer

Personal information
- Nickname: Master Blaster
- Nationality: Australian
- Born: 15 March 1965 (age 61) Blackpool, Lancashire, England
- Weight: Light welterweight

Boxing career
- Stance: Orthodox

Boxing record
- Total fights: 49
- Wins: 41
- Win by KO: 28
- Losses: 8

Lester Ellis (born 15 March 1965) is a British-born Australian former professional boxer. He is one-time world champion and four-times minor titles winner, having also held the Australian and Commonwealth (twice) titles.

At the age of 19, in 1985, Ellis fought and beat then-reigning IBF super featherweight champion Hwan-Kil Yuh over fifteen rounds. In 1993 he won the vacant World Boxing Federation (WBF) welterweight title against Rocky Berg. Ellis faced and defeated Al Coquilla in 1994 for the vacant IBO light welterweight title. Ellis went on to win another two IBO world titles, both in different weight divisions. One in 1995 against Amado Cabato at lightweight and another at light middleweight against Eric Alexander.

== Early life ==
Lester Ellis was born on 15 March 1965 in Blackpool, England to mother Sheila Ellis and his father Keith Ellis Snr. He is the youngest of three boys, with Keith Ellis being the oldest followed by Neil Ellis. The Ellis family migrated to Australia when Ellis was three on 2 October 1968.

At the age of five, Ellis's mother Sheila left the family home, leaving the three boys to live with Keith Snr. Ellis took this very hard and as a result he grew a hate towards authority figures and often did not attend school.

At the age of 12, Ellis began boxing training with Matthew Quinn at the Glengala Boxing Club in the Melbourne suburb of West Sunshine. Quinn had seen great potential in young, hateful Ellis and taught him how to harness his hate through the art of boxing.

== Amateur boxing career ==
Under amateur boxing trainer Matthew Quinn and his brother Keith, Ellis had an outstanding amateur career with a total record of 50 fights for 45 wins. Ellis had collected four Australian titles and six Victorian titles throughout this period. Ellis turned professional in 1983

== Professional career ==
=== Super featherweight IBF champion ===
In 1985, with a professional boxing record of 14 fights for 14 wins, 11 by KO at the age of 19, Ellis was offered to fight Hwan-Kil Yuh for the Super Featherweight International Boxing Federation (IBF) World Title. Ellis won this fight which went for the scheduled 15 rounds via split decision. Ellis successfully defended his title the same year against Rod Sequenan. Later that year on 12 July 1985 Ellis lost his IBF world championship via unanimous decision to ex training partner and then rival Barry Michael.

== Professional boxing record ==
49 fights	41 wins	8 losses
By knockout	28	5
By decision	13	3

== Boxing titles ==
=== Titles won by Ellis ===
1984-11-16 – Commonwealth (British Empire) Super Featherweight Title, opponent John Sichula

1985-02-15 – IBF Super Featherweight Title, opponent Hwan-Kil Yuh

1987-04-30 – Australian Lightweight Title, opponent Dale Artango

1988-03-16 – Australian light welterweight Title, opponent Pat Leglise

1988-08-04 – Commonwealth (British Empire) Light Welterweight Title, opponent Tony Laing

1993-02-19 – vacant World Boxing Federation Welterweight Title, opponent Rocky Berg

1994-12-03 – vacant International Boxing Organization Light Welterweight Title, opponent Al Coquilla

1995-03-10 – International Boxing Organization Lightweight Title, opponent Amado Cabato

1995-07-17 – vacant International Boxing Organization Light Middleweight Title, opponent Eric Alexander

== Personal life ==
Ellis is married to wife Sharon, with whom he has four sons – Lester Jr, Jake (who is a professional boxer and promoter), Darcy and Demsey. They live in the suburb of Taylors Hill, in Melbourne, Victoria. Ellis currently runs the Lester Ellis Fitness Academy from his home. Ellis's son Lester Ellis Jr has begun an acting career, recently starring as the title character's love interest in Ja'mie Private School Girl.

== See also ==
- List of boxing triple champions
- List of boxing quadruple champions
- List of boxing quintuple champions

Sporting positions
Regional boxing titles
Preceded by Tony Laing	Commonwealth Super Lightweight Champion; 4 August 1988 – 21 March 1989	Succeeded by Steve Larrimore
Minor world boxing titles
Preceded by Roger Turner	WBFo Welterweight boxing champion 19 February 1993– 19 March 1994	Succeeded by Jeff Malcolm
Vacant Title last held by Roger Mayweather	IBO Super Lightweight Champion; 3 December 1994 – 1995; Vacated	Vacant Title next held by Mario Martinez
Preceded by Amado Cabato	IBO Lightweight Champion; 10 March 1995– 1995; Vacated	Vacant Title next held by William Irwin
Major world boxing titles
Preceded by Hwan-Kil Yuh	IBF Super Featherweight Champion; 15 February – 12 July 1985	Succeeded by Barry Michael
