= Graeme Brooke =

Australian boxer

Personal information
- Nationality: Australian
- Born: 6 October 1963 (age 62) Melbourne
- Height: 5 ft 10 in (178 cm)
- Weight: light/light welterweight

Boxing career
- Stance: Orthodox

Boxing record
- Total fights: 24
- Wins: 21 (KO 9)
- Losses: 3 (KO 1)

Graeme Brooke (born 6 October 1963 in Melbourne) is an Australian professional light/light welterweight boxer of the 1980s who won the Australian lightweight title, and Commonwealth lightweight title, and was a challenger for the Commonwealth lightweight title against Langton Tinago, his professional fighting weight varied from 132 lb (60 kg; 9 st 6 lb), i.e. lightweight to 137 lb (62 kg; 9 st 11 lb), i.e. light welterweight.
