= Petro Ivanov =

Ukrainian boxer (born 1996)

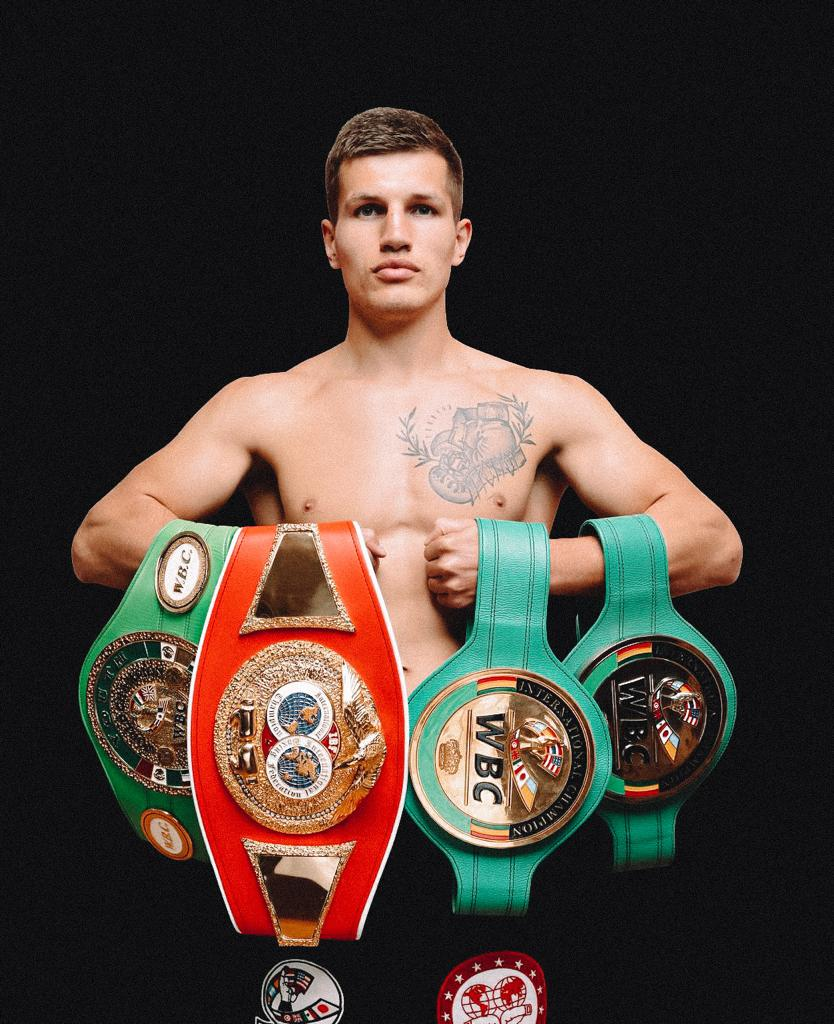
- Petro Ivanov in 2023

Personal information
- Native name: Петро Іванов
- Nationality: Ukraine
- Born: Petro Olehovych Ivanov; 12 July 1996 (age 29) Nizhyn, Ukraine
- Height: 5 ft 11 in (180 cm)
- Weight: 76.2 kg (168 lb)

Boxing career
- Weight class: Super middleweight
- Reach: 71 in (180 cm)
- Stance: Orthodox

Boxing record
- Total fights: 21
- Wins: 18
- Win by KO: 13
- Losses: 1
- Draws: 2

Petro Olehovych Ivanov (Ukrainian: Петро Олегович Іванов, IPA: [peˈtrɔ oˈlɛɦowɪtʃ iˈwɑnou̯]; born 12 July 1996) is a professional boxer from Ukraine. As of June 2023, he holds the IBF International title in the super middleweight division in the world. The Ukrainian is presently ranked as 8th in the world by the IBF, 18th in the WBC, 7th in the EBU and 15th in the IBO.

Making his professional debut in 2014, Ivanov defeated Louis Toutin through a TKO in round 9, becoming the WBC Youth World Super Middle Champion in 2018. In the past, the Ukrainian held several belts including the WBC Youth World Champion, the WBC International Silver Champion and the WBC International Champion in the super middleweight class.

In 2023, he became the ambassador of Ready to Fight, a blockchain-based boxing platform created by Sergey Lapin and Oleksandr Usyk. This platform supports effectively the needs of the boxing community by finding an opponent for sparring or duel, discuss and approve the terms of cooperation and gain money on it.

Ivanov has been boxing in Germany since 2019 while still living in Kyiv, Ukraine. Since July 2022 he lives in Karlsruhe, Germany.

== Amateur career ==
At the age of 18, Ivanov decided to move into professional boxing because since childhood he desired to enter the ring like the Klitschko brothers. He dreamed of feeling the energy of a huge arena filled with boxing fans and deserving standing ovations from the audience after each victory.

== Professional career ==
Ivanov started his professional career in 2014 with his debut in Lviv, Ukraine in the undercard fight of Oleksandr Usyk. Ivanov won by knockout in the first round in less than two minutes.

In 2018, he won his first WBC Youth World title against the previously undefeated Louis Toutin (12 wins, 11 KOs) from France. One year later, he defended his title in Karlsruhe against Vladimir Belujsyk from Slovakia by TKO in the fifth round. He attributes his success to the professional guidance to his coach Oleksandr Lichter, and the support from his manager Maxim Michailew and promoter Faechersport Management.

In August 2020, Ivanov defeated Roman Shkarupa by unanimous decision after eight rounds. This event "Big Boxing Night" was hosted by Usyk17 Promotion from heavyweight champion Oleksandr Usyk. Other boxers entering the ring were Vladyslav Sirenko, Oleksandr Zakhozhyi, Viktor Vykhryst, Daniel Lapin, Oleg Malinovskyi, and Andrii Velikovsky.

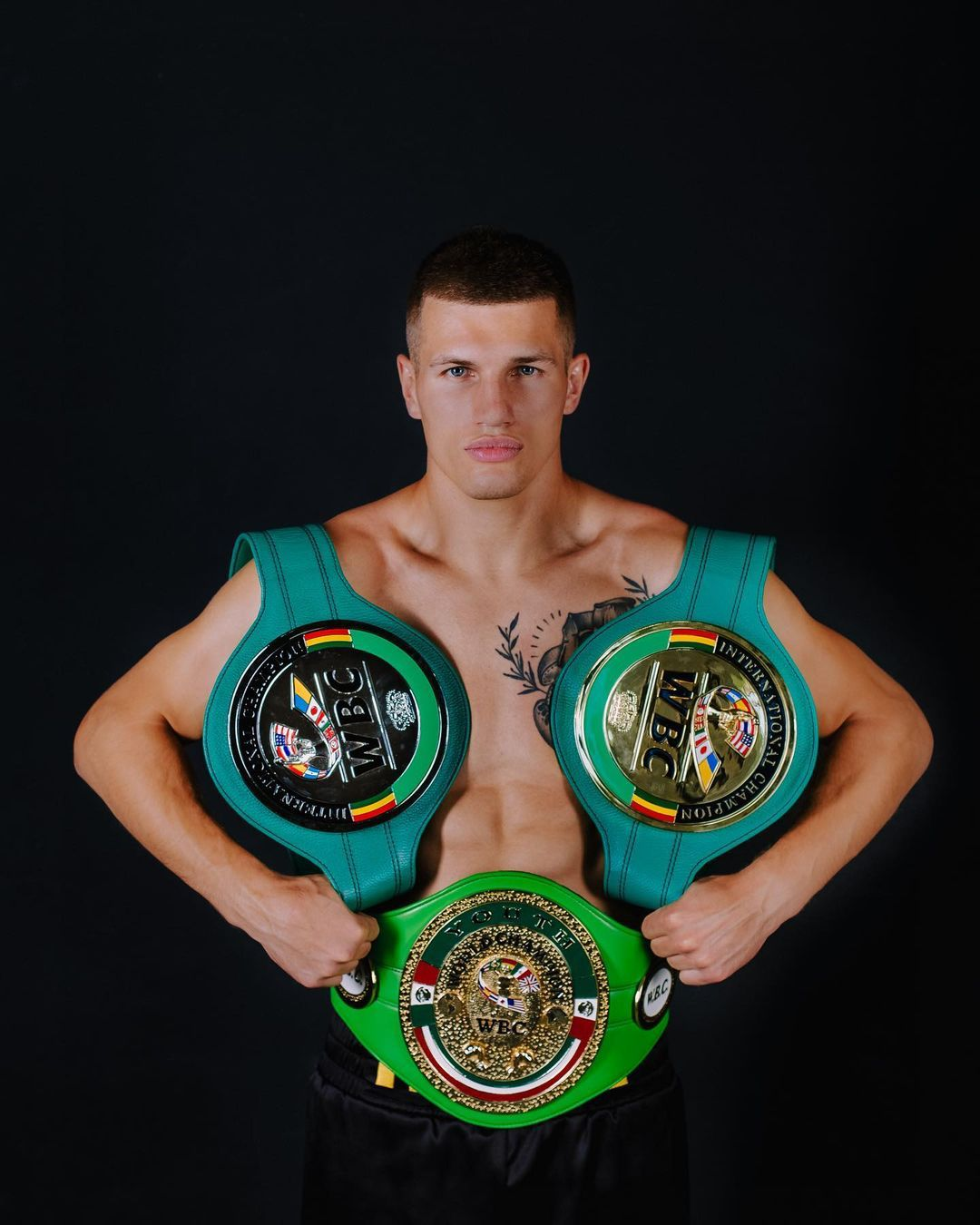
Ivanov with WBC Youth Title, WBC International Silver and Gold Title

Ivanov won his new WBC International Silver title in a fight against Yusuf Kanguel in October 2020. In the fourth round, Ivanov surprised Kanguel with his powerful hooks, uppercuts and head punches and won by KO.

In August 2021, Ivanov accepted his next title fight for WBC International Super Middle in Eggenstein-Leopoldshafen. The Ukrainian went powerfully against Rafael Amarillas Ortiz from Mexico who had only lost three times out of eighteen fights. Petro Ivanov achieved his fourteenth win out of sixteen fights (two draws) and secured his third WBC title after previously being WBC Youth and International Silver Champion.

In July 2022, Ivanov stepped into the ring at the Erdinger Boxnacht in Erding to compete for the IBF International title against Robert Talarek from Poland. Demonstrating top-class combinations, Ivanov was victorious in the fourth round, securing the win by TKO. Referee Robert Hoyle then intervened, officially declaring Ivano as the new IBF International Champion.

In June 2023, Ivanov retained his IBF International title against Gino Kanters via a 12-round KO victory. Ivanov has dominated all 12 rounds with his higher activity, power punches, precision and combinations. Kanters was too busy defending himself. With weaker power punches and precision, he couldn´t decide the fight.

As of 2023, Petro Ivanov holds the IBF International Super Middleweight title and is officially ranked seventh in the world by the IBF's list of rankings.

Ivanov was scheduled to challenge Osleys Iglesias for IBO super middleweight title in Montreal, Canada on November 7, 2024. He lost the fight by TKO in the fifth round.

== Professional boxing record ==
21 fights	18 wins	1 loss
By knockout	13	1
By decision	5	0
Draws	2	

No.	Result	Record	Opponent	Type	Round, time	Date	Location	Notes
21	Loss	18–1–2	(Cuba) Osleys Iglesias	TKO	5 (12), 0:40	7 Nov 2024	Montreal Casino, Montreal, Canada	For IBO super middleweight title
20	Win	18–0–2	(Colombia) Juan Boada	TKO	4 (10), 2:36	28 Oct 2023	Motorworld, München, Bayern, Germany	
19	Win	17–0–2	(Netherlands) Gino Kanters	KO	12 (12), 2:55	24 Jun 2023	Stadthalle, Rostock, Mecklenburg-Vorpommern, Germany	Retained IBF International super middleweight title
18	Win	16–0–2	(Poland) Robert Talarek	TKO	4 (12), 2:19	2 Jul 2022	Stadtwerke Arena, Erding, Bayern, Germany	Won vacant IBF International super middleweight title
17	Win	15–0–2	(Germany) Nuhu Lawal	RTD	1 (10), 3:00	22 Jan 2022	Boxclub Home of Champions-Ka, Eggenstein-Leopoldshafen, Baden-Württemberg, Germany	
16	Win	14–0–2	(Mexico) Rafael Amarillas Ortiz	KO	3 (12)	31 Jul 2021	Boxclub Home of Champions-Ka, Eggenstein-Leopoldshafen, Baden-Württemberg, Germany	Won vacant WBC International super middleweight title
15	Win	13–0–2	(Germany) Yusuf Kanguel	KO	4 (10), 1:44	16 Oct 2020	Palazzohalle, Karlsruhe, Baden-Württemberg, Germany	Won vacant WBC International Silver super middleweight title
14	Win	12–0–2	(Ukraine) Roman Shkarupa	UD	8	1 Aug 2020	Equides Club, Lesniki, Ukraine	
13	Win	11–0–2	(Slovakia) Vladimir Belujsky	TKO	5 (10), 1:46	11 Oct 2019	Palazzohalle, Karlsruhe, Baden-Württemberg, Germany	Retained WBC Youth super middleweight title
12	Win	10–0–2	(France) Louis Toutin	TKO	9 (10), 1:53	8 Dec 2018	Palais des sports Marcel Cerdan, Levallois-Perret, Hauts-de-Seine, France	Won vacant WBC Youth super middleweight title
11	Draw	9–0–2	(Ukraine) Igor Kudrytskyi	MD	8	14 Apr 2018	National Olympic Team Training Centre, Koncha-Zaspa, Ukraine	
10	Win	9–0–1	(Croatia) Bosko Misic	KO	2 (8), 1:16	20 Jan 2018	Parkovy Convention Centre, Kyiv, Ukraine	
9	Win	8–0–1	(Ukraine) Mykola Korenev	UD	8	23 Sep 2017	National Olympic Team Training Centre, Koncha-Zaspa, Ukraine	
8	Win	7–0–1	(Ukraine) Vladyslav Yeromenko	TKO	6 (8), 2:58	21 Jul 2017	National Olympic Team Training Centre, Koncha-Zaspa, Ukraine	
7	Win	6–0–1	(Ukraine) Volodymyr Romanenko	TKO	2 (6), 1:51	22 Apr 2017	Parkovy Convention Centre, Kyiv, Ukraine	
6	Draw	5–0–1	(Ukraine) Ramil Gadzhyiev	SD	8	15 Oct 2016	Sports School #4, Rivne, Ukraine	
5	Win	5–0	(Georgia (country)) Davit Ribakoni	TKO	1 (4), 1:33	23 Apr 2016	Sport Palace, Kyiv, Ukraine	
4	Win	4–0	(Georgia (country)) Beka Aduashvili	UD	6	29 Aug 2015	Sport Palace, Kyiv, Ukraine	
3	Win	3–0	(Ukraine) Sergii Shevchuk	UD	4 (4)	18 Apr 2015	Sport Palace, Kyiv, Ukraine	
2	Win	2–0	(Georgia (country)) Levan Shonia	UD	4 (4)	13 Dec 2014	Sport Palace, Kyiv, Ukraine	
1	Win	1–0	(Ukraine) Andriy Danichkin	TKO	1 (4), 1:58	4 Oct 2014	Arena Lviv, Lviv, Ukraine	
