= Mwale =

Mwale is an East African surname. Notable people with this surname include:

- Beatrice Roseby Mwale, Malawian politician
- Bush Mwale (born 1993), Kenyan rugby sevens player
- Chanju Samantha Mwale, Malawian lawyer and army officer
- David Mwale (born 1999), Zambian boxer
- Davis Mwale (born 1972), Zambian boxer
- Fiona Mwale (born 1974), Malawian judge
- Lottie Mwale (1952–2005), Zambian boxer
- MacDonald Mafuta Mwale (born 1970), Malawian economist and public servant
- Martha Mwale (1945-2004), Malawian teacher, political prisoner, and church leader
- Masauso Mwale, Zambian football coach
- Maximo Chanda Mwale (1961–2001), Zambian comedian
- Temi Mwale, British social entrepreneur and campaigner
- Tindi Mwale (born 1986), Kenyan politician
- Theresa Gloria Mwale (born 1947), Malawian nurse and politician
- Vincent Mwale (born 1976), Zambian politician
- Yvonne Mwale (born 1988), Zambian singer
