= List of British super-middleweight boxing champions =

List of British super-middleweight boxing champions is a table showing the boxers who have won the British super-middleweight title, which has been sanctioned by the British Boxing Board of Control (BBBoC) since 1989.

A champion will often voluntarily relinquish the title in order to fight for a higher-ranked championship, such as the world or European. Where the date on which a champion relinquished the title is unclear, the date of the last BBBoC sanctioned fight is shown.

^{r} – Champion relinquished title.
^{s} – Champion stripped of title.

Name	Duration of reign	Defences
Sam Storey	19 September 1989 - 30 October 1990	2
James Cook	30 October 1990^{r}	0
Fidel Castro Smith	24 September 1991 – 23 September 1992	2
Henry Wharton	23 September 1992^{r}	0
James Cook	16 September 1993 – 11 March 1994	1
Cornelius Carr	11 March 1994^{r}	0
Ali Forbes	23 January 1995 – 27 April 1995	1
Sam Storey	27 April 1995^{r}	0
Joe Calzaghe	28 October 1995 – 20 April 1996^{r}	1
David Starie	8 April 1997 - 19 July 1997	1
Dean Francis	19 July 1997 - 7 March 1998^{r}	1
David Starie	21 November 1998 - 29 September 2001^{r}	4
Matthew Barney	29 March 2003^{r}	0
Tony Dodson	22 November 2003^{r}	0
Carl Froch	24 September 2004 – 9 November 2007^{r}	4
Brian Magee	13 December 2008^{r}	0
Tony Quigley	28 March 2009 – 30 October 2009	1
Paul Smith	30 October 2009 – 11 December 2010	3
James DeGale	11 December 2010 – 21 May 2011	1
George Groves	21 May 2011 – 5 November 2011^{r}	1
Kenny Anderson	20 October 2012^{r}	0
Paul Smith	29 June 2013^{r}	0
Callum Smith	7 November 2015^{r}	0
Rocky Fielding	22 April 2017 - 30 September 2017^{r}	1
Zach Parker	3 November 2018^{r}	0
Lerrone Richards	30 November 2019 – November 2020^{r}	0
Lennox Clarke	27 March 2021 – 16 July 2022	0
Mark Heffron	16 July 2022 – 2 September 2023	0
Jack Cullen	2 September 2023 – 20 January 2024	0
Zak Chelli	20 January 2024 – 3 August 2024	0
Callum Simpson	3 August 2024 – 20 December 2025	1
Troy Williamson	20 December 2025 – present	0

== See also ==
- List of British heavyweight boxing champions
- List of British cruiserweight boxing champions
- List of British light-heavyweight boxing champions
- List of British middleweight boxing champions
- List of British light-middleweight boxing champions
- List of British welterweight boxing champions
- List of British light-welterweight boxing champions
- List of British lightweight boxing champions
- List of British super-featherweight boxing champions
- List of British featherweight boxing champions
- List of British super-bantamweight boxing champions
- List of British bantamweight boxing champions
- List of British super-flyweight boxing champions
- List of British flyweight boxing champions
- List of British world boxing champions
