= Osleys Iglesias =

Cuban boxer (born 1997)

Personal information
- Nicknames: El Tornado ("The Tornado")
- Born: Osleys Iglesias Estrada; 14 December 1997 (age 28) Havana, Cuba
- Height: 6 ft 2 1/2 in (189 cm)
- Weight: Super middleweight

Boxing career
- Stance: Southpaw

Boxing record
- Total fights: 16
- Wins: 16
- Win by KO: 15
Medal record
Men's Amateur boxing
Representing Cuba
Cuban National Championships
Silver medal – second place	2015 Camaguey	Middleweight
Silver medal – second place	2016 Santiago de Cuba	Middleweight
Silver medal – second place	2017 Sancti Spiritus	Middleweight
Silver medal – second place	2018 Camaguey	Middleweight
Thailand International Invitational Tournament
Silver medal – second place	2017 Bangkok	Middleweight

Osleys Iglesias Estrada (born 14 December 1997) is a Cuban professional boxer. He has held the IBO super middleweight title since December 2022 and the IBF super middleweight title since April 2026.

== Amateur career ==
Osleys Iglesias fought for the 2015 Cuban National Championship and he won against Reinier Pérez in the 1st round, Yainier Abreu in the 2nd round but lost against Arlen López in the finals, this is the same format of opponents and results he had at the 2017 Cuban National Championship, although in the 2016 Cuban National Championship, he beat Osnay Bencosme and Hugo Noriega before losing to Arlen López again. Iglesias fought in the Thailand International Invitational Tournament back in April 2017, he won against Eumir Marcial (Philippines) on the quarter-finals, also won against Erik Alzhanov (Kazakhstan) in the semi-finals but lost against Israil Madrimov (Uzbekistan) on the finals. During the 2018 Cuban National Championships, he got wins over Yusmel Alejandro Ruiz in the 1st round and Yojanler Martinez on the 2nd, but again lost to Arlen Lopéz on the finals.

== Professional career ==
=== Early career ===
Iglesias turned professional in 2019 and started fighting in Germany for the early days of his career, where he picked up wins against Malkhaz Sujashvili, Rafael Bejaran and Bernard Donfack, Iglesias began fighting at Poland by late 2021.

After the COVID-19 pandemic began to cool down, Iglesias returned to boxing to fight the Uruguayan veteran Rafael Sosa Pintos on 11 December 2021, at Szeligi, Poland, the match ended in a first-round technical knockout win for Iglesias.

==== Iglesias vs. Rácz ====
On 19 February 2022, at Wrocław, Poland, Iglesias fought Slovakian knockout artist Robert Rácz for the vacant IBO Youth super middleweight championship, in the first round, Iglesias floored Rácz down, ending the match early.

==== Iglesias vs. Chilemba ====
After winning the IBO Youth championship, Iglesias fought Malawian veteran Isaac Chilemba for the vacant WBA Inter-continental and IBO International super middleweight titles. The bout went to the distance and Iglesias earned his first ever decision bout as he prevails via unanimous decision.

==== Iglesias vs. Maderna ====
After defeating Chilemba, Iglesias was set to fight Azizbek Abdugofurov, however, Abdugofurov pulled out, Iglesias went to fight Ezequiel Maderna instead, this was not the first time Iglesias had a cancelled bout, as he had previously been scheduled to fight Luke Blackledge in Hamburg, Germany on 25 January 2020. In the match against Maderna, Iglesias won via firs-round knockout.

=== IBO super-middleweight champion ===
==== Iglesias vs. Velikovskyi ====
After notable victories against experienced boxers Isaac Chilemba and Ezequiel Maderna, Iglesias was given a world title shot against Ukrainian Andrii Velikovskyi for the vacant IBO super middleweight title, the bout nearly went the distance until in round 10, Iglesias floored Velikovskyi en route to a 10th-round knockout victory, making him the new IBO super middleweight champion.

==== Iglesias vs. Reis ====
His first defence of the IBO title was against undefeated (11–0) German boxer Artur Reis in Magdeburg, Germany on 7 October 2023, marking his return on boxing in Germany. The match was able to last up to four rounds before Iglesias made a stunning knockout punch against Reus.

==== Iglesias vs. Cóceres ====
On 7 March 2024, Iglesias and Marcelo Cóceres marked their first bout in 2024 together, their bout serving as a co-main for the Steven Butler vs. Steve Rolls card at Montreal Casino, this also marks as Iglesias' professional debut outside of Europe. On the first round of their scheduled non-titled 10-rounds match, Iglesias, towering over Cóceres who came fresh from a knockout loss against Diego Pacheco, utilized his reach advantage and jab, a combination of a jab followed by a left hook to the temple put Cóceres down en route to a first-round KO.

==== Iglesias vs. Shvedenko ====
On 6 June 2024, Iglesias defended his IBO super middleweight title against world-ranked Russian Evgeny Shvedenko at Montreal Casino, Canada, Iglesias won via frightening 1st-round knockout against Shvedenko.

==== Iglesias vs. Ivanov ====
Iglesias was scheduled to defend his IBO super middleweight title against Petro Ivanov in Montreal, Canada on November 7, 2024. He won the fight by TKO in the fifth round.

==== Iglesias vs. Shishkin ====
On 4 September 2025 in Montreal Casino, Montreal, Canada, Iglesias defended his IBO crown against world-ranked Vladimir Shishkin in an International Boxing Federation (IBF) super middleweight title eliminator. According to the IBF's official website, in July 2025, Shishkin was ranked no. 2 and Iglesias no. 3, whilst the first spot is vacant, thus, the winner will be the IBF mandatory for Canelo Alvarez' undisputed super middleweight titles. Iglesias prevailed after he landed a left hand that sent Shishkin through the ropes followed-up by a flury, compelling the referee to halt the contest.

=== IBF super-middleweight championship ===
==== Iglesias vs. Silyagin ====
After Terence Crawford retired and vacated the undisputed super middleweight titles, the four major sanctioning bodies were up for grab and Iglesias, having had won the IBF title eliminator, was the mandatory to challenge for the vacant IBF title. Originally the IBF proposed Canelo Álvarez, however Álvarez would reject the fight offer, instead routing for the other belts, then Jaime Munguía would follow, other certain circumstances wojld continued to halt Iglesias' opponent for the vacant title. For example, number 5 Callum Simpson auddenly losing via an upset against Troy Williamson. Albeit, one of the major factors of Iglesias being rejected multiple times was because of his lack of popularity and the how much fighting the other contenders would offer more. Eventually, Iglesias was able to be scheduled to challenge for the vacant IBF super middleweight title and defend his IBO super middleweight title against Russian Pavel Silyagin in Montreal, Canada, on April 9, 2026. After breaking Siyagin's nose and wearing him off over the course of eight rounds, he forced his opponent's corner to halt the contest, unifying his IBO title with the vacant IBF super middleweight title.

=== Iglesias vs Zaren ===
Iglesias successfully defended his IBF and IBO super-middleweight titles against the previously unbeaten Oliver Zaren at Capitole de Quebec in Quebec City, Canada, on October 8, 2026, winning by technical knockout in the seventh round.

== Professional boxing record ==
16 fights	16 wins	0 losses
By knockout	15	0
By decision	1	0

No.	Result	Record	Opponent	Type	Round, time	Date	Location	Notes
16	Win	16–0	Oliver Zaren	TKO	7 (12), 1:31	8 Oct 2026	Capitole de Quebec, Quebec City, Canada	Retained IBF and IBO super-middleweight titles
15	Win	15–0	Pavel Silyagin	RTD	8 (12), 3:00	9 Apr 2026	Montreal Casino, Montreal, Canada	Retained IBO super-middleweight title; Won vacant IBF super-middleweight title
14	Win	14–0	Vladimir Shishkin	TKO	8 (12), 1:28	4 Sep 2025	Montreal Casino, Montreal, Canada	Retained IBO super-middleweight title
13	Win	13–0	Petro Ivanov	TKO	5 (12), 0:40	7 Nov 2024	Montreal Casino, Montreal, Canada	Retained IBO super-middleweight title
12	Win	12–0	Sena Agbeko	TKO	2 (10), 1:16	17 Aug 2024	Centre Vidéotron, Quebec City, Canada	
11	Win	11–0	Evgeny Shvedenko	KO	1 (12), 2:48	6 Jun 2024	Montreal Casino, Montreal, Canada	Retained IBO super-middleweight title
10	Win	10–0	Marcelo Cóceres	KO	1 (10), 2:07	7 Mar 2024	Montreal Casino, Montreal, Canada	
9	Win	9–0	Artur Reis	KO	4 (12), 2:01	7 Oct 2023	Maritim Hotel, Magdeburg, Germany	Retained IBO super-middleweight title
8	Win	8–0	Andrii Velikovskyi	TKO	10 (12), 0:58	9 Dec 2022	Gliwice Arena, Gliwice, Poland	Won vacant IBO super-middleweight title
7	Win	7–0	Ezequiel Maderna	KO	1 (10), 2:05	24 Sep 2022	Hala Dworca Łódź Fabryczna, Łódź, Poland	
6	Win	6–0	Isaac Chilemba	UD	12	27 May 2022	Hala Globus, Lublin, Poland	Won vacant WBA Inter-Continental and IBO International super-middleweight titles
5	Win	5–0	Robert Rácz	KO	1 (10), 2:25	19 Feb 2022	Hala Orbita, Wrocław, Poland	Won vacant IBO Youth super-middleweight title
4	Win	4–0	Rafael Sosa Pintos	TKO	1 (8), 1:12	11 Dec 2021	Transcolor, Szeligi, Poland	
3	Win	3–0	Bernard Donfack	TKO	2 (8), 1:18	8 Feb 2020	EWS Arena, Göppingen, Germany	
2	Win	2–0	Rafael Bejaran	KO	2 (8), 0:23	9 Nov 2019	Kuppel, Hamburg, Germany	
1	Win	1–0	Malkhaz Sujashvili	TKO	1 (4), 1:05	8 Sep 2019	Work Your Champ Arena, Hamburg, Germany	

== Titles in boxing ==
=== Major world titles ===
- IBF super middleweight champion (168 lbs)

=== Minor world titles ===
- IBO super middleweight champion (168 lbs)

=== Regional titles ===
- WBA Inter-Continental super middleweight champion (168 lbs)
- IBO International super middleweight champion (168 lbs)

=== Youth titles ===
- IBO Youth super middleweight champion (168 lbs)

== See also ==
- List of male boxers
- List of southpaw stance boxers
- List of world super-middleweight boxing champions

Sporting positions
Regional boxing titles
Vacant Title last held by Aslambek Idigov	IBO Youth super-middleweight champion 19 February 2022 – 2022; Vacated	Vacant Title next held by Leon Bauer
Vacant Title last held by Anthony Sims Jr.	WBA Intercontinental super-middleweight champion 27 May 2022 – 2022; Vacated	Vacant Title next held by Bektemir Melikuziev
Vacant Title last held by William Scull	IBO International super-middleweight champion 27 May 2022 – 2022; Vacated	Vacant Title next held by Mate Kis
Minor world boxing titles
Vacant Title last held by Lerrone Richards	IBO super-middleweight champion 9 December 2022 – pressnt	Incumbent
Major world boxing titles
Vacant Title last held by Terence Crawford	IBF super-middleweight champion 9 April 2026 – pressnt	Incumbent
