= List of current WBC International champions =

This is a list of current WBC International champions. The International title is one of the World Boxing Council's highest regional championships, below world level and WBC Silver.

Weight class	Champion	Record	Defenses
Heavyweight	vacant		
Bridgerweight	(Croatia) Marko Calic	17-2 (10 KOs)	0
Cruiserweight	(England) Aloys Youmbi	11–1 (9 KOs)	0
Light heavyweight	(Turkey) Avni Yıldırım	28–5 (17 KOs)	1
Super middleweight	(Croatia) Luka Plantić	13–0 (10 KOs)	4
Middleweight	(Philippines) Eumir Marcial	7-0 (4 KOs)	0
Super welterweight	vacant		
Welterweight	(Ukraine) Yaroslav Mykhalushko	12–0 (9 KOs)	0
Super lightweight	vacant		
Lightweight	(United States) Jordan White	20-2 (12 KOs)	0
Super featherweight	(England) Ryan Garner	19–0 (10 KOs)	4
Featherweight	(United States) Kevin Walsh	20–0 (10 KOs)	0
Super bantamweight	vacant		
Bantamweight	(Zambia) David Mwale	13–0 (7 KOs)	1
Super flyweight	(England) Charlie Edwards	21-2 (7 KOs)	0
Flyweight	(England) Brandon Daord	12–0 (3 KOs)	0
Light flyweight	(Philippines) Arvin Magramo	20–2–1 (11 KOs)	1
Strawweight	(Philippines) Joey Canoy	25–5–2 (15 KOs)	0

== See also ==
- List of WBC world champions
- List of current WBC Youth world champions
