= Sadjo =

Sadjo is a surname. Notable people with the surname include:

- Babetida Sadjo (born 1983), Belgian actress
- Haman Sadjo, Cameroonian footballer
- Kévin Lele Sadjo (born 1990), French boxer
