= Joseph Parker vs. Derek Chisora II =

Boxing match

- Date: 18 December 2021
- Venue: Manchester Arena, Manchester, UK
- Title on the line: WBO Inter-Continental heavyweight title

Tale of the tape
Boxer	Joseph Parker	Derek Chisora
Nickname	"Lupesoliai La'auliolemalietoa"	"War"
Hometown	South Auckland, Auckland, New Zealand	Finchley, London, UK
Pre-fight record	29–2 (21 KOs)	32–11 (23 KOs)
Age	29 years, 11 months	37 years, 11 months
Height	6 ft 4 in (193 cm)	6 ft 2 in (188 cm)
Weight	251 lb (114 kg)	248 1/2 lb (113 kg)
Style	Orthodox	Orthodox
Recognition	WBO; No. 2 Ranked Heavyweight; IBF; No. 3 Ranked Heavyweight; WBC; No. 4 Ranked Heavyweight; WBA; No. 13 Ranked Heavyweight; The Ring; No. 5 Ranked Heavyweight; TBRB; No. 8 Ranked Heavyweight	WBC; No. 12 Ranked Heavyweight

Result
- Parker wins via 12–round unanimous decision (115–110, 115–111, 114–112)

Joseph Parker vs. Derek Chisora II, was a professional boxing match contested between former heavyweight champion and WBO Inter-Continental heavyweight champion, Joseph Parker, and Derek Chisora. The bout took place on 18 December 2021 at the AO Arena, with Parker winning by unanimous decision.

== Background ==
Following the controversial split decision victory in their first in May, both Joseph Parker and Derek Chisora expressed interest in an immediate rematch. On 16 September 2021, it was announced that a rematch on 18 December, again at the Manchester Arena.

Speaking to BBC Sport in the build up Parker would suggest that he might retire if he lost the rematch, saying "I just want to beat him properly this time. If I can't beat Derek then I have to really look at myself and where I go from there."

== Fight details ==
Parker would largely dominate the bout, landing many overhand rights and uppercuts that hurt Chisora. A big right uppercut from Parker had Chisora wobbling into the ropes, which the referee Howard Foster ruled a knockdown as the ropes had kept him up. Another uppercut sent Chisora down in the seventh and again in the eight. Chisora was again in trouble in the ninth, it appeared at one point that the referee was on the verge of stepping in and waving it off, but Chisora was able to the survive the round. Chisora appeared to be the fresher in the last two rounds but he was never able to hurt Parker. All three judges unanimously scored the fight in favour of Parker, with scores of 115–110, 115-111 and 114–112. Compubox showed that Parker landed 144 of his 464 punches thrown (42%) and Chisora landed 122 of his 466 thrown (34%).

== Aftermath ==
Speaking in the ring after result, Parker said that "Derek always comes for war, he was one tough guy and never stopped coming forward until the end, we practised and practised that uppercut. What a Christmas present. I felt a lot stronger. It was important to start strong and not be negative from the beginning. You can see there are improvements to be made. Derek Chisora is a credit to the sport of boxing." Promoter Eddie Hearn, speaking to DAZN, said: "Derek Chisora is not human. How that went 12 rounds I'll never know. There was zero quit in him. Both those guys deserve a huge amount of credit."

Attention was drawn to the scorecards which were widely perceived to be overly generous to Chisora: reporters Mike Coppinger opined that "the judges were trying to rob" Parker, while Chris Mannix stated, "These are criminally, criminally, bad scorecards."

== Fight card ==
Confirmed bouts:

Weight Class		vs.		Method	Round	Time	Notes
Heavyweight	Joseph Parker (c)	def.	Derek Chisora	UD	12/12		^{Note 1}
Super-middleweight	Kévin Lele Sadjo	def.	Jack Cullen	TKO	6/12	1:11	^{Note 2}
Super-featherweight	Zelfa Barrett	def.	Bruno Tarimo	UD	12/12		^{Note 3}
Super-middleweight	Lerrone Richards	def.	Carlos Góngora (c)	SD	12/12		^{Note 4}
Heavyweight	Alen Babić	def.	David Spilmont	KO	6/8	0:53
Cruiserweight	David Nyika	def.	Anthony Carpin	RTD	1/4	3:00
Preliminary bouts
Light-welterweight	Sandy Ryan	def.	Maria Soledad Capriolo	TKO	3/8	1:11
Cruiserweight	Jordan Thompson	def.	Piotr Budziszewski	TKO	1/6	0:53
Lightweight	Rhiannon Dixon	def.	Vaida Masiokaite	PTS	6/6

^Note 1 For WBO Inter-Continental heavyweight title
^Note 2 For European super-middleweight title
^Note 3 Eliminator for IBF super-featherweight title
^Note 4 For IBO super-middleweight title

== Broadcasting ==
Country	Broadcaster
Country	Stream
Worldwide	DAZN

Preceded by First Bout	Joseph Parker's bouts 18 December 2021	Succeeded by vs. Joe Joyce
Preceded by First Bout	Derek Chisora's bouts 18 December 2021	Succeeded by vs. Kubrat Pulev
