= Lennox Clarke =

English boxer (born 1991)

Personal information
- Born: 15 July 1991 (age 35) Birmingham, England
- Height: 5 ft 10 in (178 cm)
- Weight: Super-middleweight; Light-heavyweight

Boxing career
- Stance: Orthodox

Boxing record
- Total fights: 23
- Wins: 20
- Win by KO: 8
- Losses: 2
- Draws: 1

Lennox Clarke (born 15 July 1991) is an English former professional boxer who held the British and Commonwealth super-middleweight titles from 2021 to 2022.

== Professional career ==
Clarke made his professional debut on 16 November 2013, scoring a second-round technical knockout (TKO) victory against James Child at the Town Hall in Walsall.

After compiling a record of 6–0 (3 KOs), he defeated Dan Blackwell via points decision (PTS) over eight rounds on 21 February 2015, capturing the vacant British Masters Bronze super-middleweight title at the Stadium Suite at the Banks's Stadium in Walsall.

Following eight more wins and one draw, Clarke faced Jahmaine Smyle for the IBO Continental super-middleweight title on 2 December 2017 at the Leicester Arena. Clarke scored a knockdown in the ninth round en route to a unanimous decision (UD) victory to win his second regional title. All three judges scored the bout 97–92.

He scored three more wins before challenging Commonwealth super-middleweight champion Lerrone Richards. The bout took place on 30 November 2019 at the Arena Birmingham, with the vacant British super-middleweight title also on the line. After a closely contested twelve-rounds which saw Clarke march forward as the aggressor while Richards remained on the back foot, boxing at range, Clarke suffered the first defeat of his career, losing via split decision (SD). One judge scored the bout 115–113 in favour of Clarke while the other two scored it 117–112 and 116–113 for Richards.

== Cocaine supplying conviction ==
In March 2025, Clarke was sentenced to six years and four months in prison after being convicted of supplying cocaine. During the sentencing hearing Gloucester Crown Court heard he had a previous conviction for supplying drugs dating back to 2012, with the judge telling him he had not learned his lesson.

== Professional boxing record ==
| 23 fights | 20 wins | 2 losses |
|---|---|---|
| By knockout | 8 | 1 |
| By decision | 12 | 1 |
| Draws | 1 | |

| No. | Result | Record | Opponent | Type | Round, time | Date | Location | Notes |
|---|---|---|---|---|---|---|---|---|
| 23 | Loss | 20–2–1 | Mark Heffron | TKO | 5 (12), 2:28 | 16 Jul 2022 | Copper Box Arena, London, England | Lost British and Commonwealth super-middleweight titles; For IBF Inter-Continental super-middleweight title |
| 22 | Win | 20–1–1 | Willy Hutchinson | TKO | 5 (12), 1:05 | 27 Mar 2021 | Copper Box Arena, London, England | Won vacant British and Commonwealth super-middleweight titles |
| 21 | Loss | 19–1–1 | Lerrone Richards | SD | 12 | 30 Nov 2019 | Arena Birmingham, Birmingham, England | For Commonwealth and vacant British super-middleweight titles |
| 20 | Win | 19–0–1 | Darryl Sharp | PTS | 4 | 28 Sep 2019 | Town Hall, Walsall, England | |
| 19 | Win | 18–0–1 | Elvis Dube | PTS | 4 | 22 Dec 2018 | Stadium Suite at Banks's Stadium, Walsall, England | |
| 18 | Win | 17–0–1 | Wilmer Gonzalez | TKO | 1 (6), 1:57 | 21 Apr 2018 | Town Hall, Walsall, England | |
| 17 | Win | 16–0–1 | Jahmaine Smyle | UD | 10 | 2 Dec 2017 | Leicester Arena, Leicester, England | Won vacant IBO Continental super-middleweight title |
| 16 | Draw | 15–0–1 | Karel Horejsek | PTS | 8 | 13 May 2017 | Barclaycard Arena, Birmingham, England | |
| 15 | Win | 15–0 | Bartlomiej Grafka | PTS | 8 | 17 Feb 2017 | Stadium Suite at Banks's Stadium, Walsall, England | |
| 14 | Win | 14–0 | Adam Jones | PTS | 4 | 22 Oct 2016 | Barclaycard Arena, Birmingham, England | |
| 13 | Win | 13–0 | Zahari Mutafchiev | TKO | 2 (4), 0:13 | 2 Sep 2016 | Stadium Suite at Banks's Stadium, Walsall, England | |
| 12 | Win | 12–0 | Dean Gillen | TKO | 1 (8), 2:22 | 9 Jul 2016 | Town Hall, Walsall, England | |
| 11 | Win | 11–0 | Kiril Psonko | PTS | 4 | 28 May 2016 | The Venue, Birmingham, England | |
| 10 | Win | 10–0 | Richard Horton | TKO | 1 (8), 1:44 | 19 Feb 2016 | Town Hall, Walsall, England | |
| 9 | Win | 9–0 | Elvis Dube | PTS | 4 | 18 Dec 2015 | Stadium Suite at Banks's Stadium, Walsall, England | |
| 8 | Win | 8–0 | Alistair Warren | PTS | 4 | 9 May 2015 | Barclaycard Arena, Birmingham, England | |
| 7 | Win | 7–0 | Dan Blackwell | PTS | 8 | 21 Feb 2015 | Stadium Suite at Banks's Stadium, Walsall, England | Won vacant British Masters Bronze super-middleweight title |
| 6 | Win | 6–0 | Jamie Ambler | PTS | 4 | 29 Nov 2014 | Town Hall, Walsall, England | |
| 5 | Win | 5–0 | Raimonds Sniedze | TKO | 1 (4), 0:32 | 24 Oct 2014 | Hatherley Manor Hotel, Cheltenham, England | |
| 4 | Win | 4–0 | Joe Walsh | TKO | 1 (4), 1:59 | 11 Jul 2014 | Town Hall, Walsall, England | |
| 3 | Win | 3–0 | Shaun Law | PTS | 4 | 1 Mar 2014 | Town Hall, Walsall, England | |
| 2 | Win | 2–0 | Jody Meikle | PTS | 4 | 19 Dec 2013 | Holiday Inn, Birmingham, England | |
| 1 | Win | 1–0 | James Child | TKO | 2 (4), 1:58 | 16 Nov 2013 | Town Hall, Walsall, England | |

Sporting positions
Regional boxing titles
| N/A | British Masters Bronze super-middleweight champion 21 February 2015 – May 2015 | N/A |
| Inaugural champion | IBO Continental super-middleweight champion 2 December 2017 – 2018 | Vacant Title next held by Toni Kraft |
