= Oliver Zaren =

Danish boxer (born 1999)

Personal information
- Nickname: Great Dane
- Nationality: Danish
- Born: 11 November 1999 (age 26) Roskilde, Denmark
- Height: 6 ft (183 cm) 1 1/2
- Weight: Super Middleweight

Boxing career
- Stance: Southpaw

Boxing record
- Total fights: 21
- Wins: 19
- Win by KO: 8
- Losses: 1
- No contests: 1

Oliver Zaren (born 11 November 1999) is a Danish professional boxer. He challenged for the challenged IBF and IBO super-middleweight titles in 2026.

== Amateur career ==
Zaren was a four time national champion. He is trained by former super middleweight world champion Mikkel Kessler.

== Professional career ==
=== Zaren vs Harding Jr ===
Zaren fought on the undercard of former world champion Charlie Edwards at York Hall. Zaren beat Brit John Harding Jr over 8 rounds with a score of 80–71. In the first round Zaren dropped Harding with a right hand.

=== Zaren vs Lacroix ===
Zaren returned to England to fight on the undercard of Lyndon Arthur vs Liam Cameron in Bolton. He faced French journeyman Thomas Lacroix. Zaren overwhelmed and stopped the Frenchman in the second round showing him no respect for his defence as he got through his guard with ease.

=== Zaren vs Arriaza ===
Zaren fought on the undercard of his fellow countrywoman Dina Thorslund who was defending two of her world titles. He stopped Spaniard Roberto Arriaza in the second round with a devastating right hand.

=== Zaren vs Maigwisya ===
On 14 June 2025 Zaren defeated Joseph Maigwisya of Tanzania in Copenhagen on points.

=== Zaren vs Iglesias ===
Zaren challenged IBF and IBO super-middleweight champion Osleys Iglesias at Capitole de Quebec in Quebec City, Canada, on 8 October 2026, losing by technical knockout in the seventh round.

== Professional boxing record ==
21 fights	19 wins	1 loss
By knockout	8	1
By decision	11	0
No contests	1	

No.	Result	Record	Opponent	Type	Round, time	Date	Location	Notes
21	Loss	19–1 (1)	(Cuba) Osleys Iglesias	TKO	7 (12), 1:31	8 Oct 2026	Capitole de Quebec, Quebec City, Canada	For IBF and IBO super-middleweight titles
20	NC	19–0 (1)	(Spain) Jose Luis Navarro Jr.	TD	3 (12), 3:00	19 Jun 2026	Hipodromo de la Zarzuela, Madrid, Spain	For vacant European super middleweight title. The bout was stopped after three rounds due to heavy rain.
19	Win	19–0	(Argentina) David Benitez	KO	2 (8), 0:40	31 Jan 2026	Sydbank Arena, Kolding, Denmark	
18	Win	18–0	(Croatia) Ante Bilic	UD	10	4 Oct 2025	Herlev Hallen, Herlev, Denmark	Won vacant IBF Inter-Continental super-middleweight title
17	Win	17–0	(Tanzania) Joseph Maigwisya	UD	10	14 Jun 2025	Crowne Plaza Hotel, Copenhagen, Denmark	
16	Win	16–0	(France) Samuel Cavret	KO	4 (8), 0:57	8 Mar 2025	Hotel Scandic Sluseholmen, Copenhagen, Denmark	
15	Win	15–0	(Mexico) Carlos Gallego Montijo	TKO	6 (8), 1:12	29 Nov 2024	Frederiksberg Hallerne, Copenhagen, Denmark	
14	Win	14–0	(Spain) Roberto Arriaza	KO	2 (8), 2:13	25 Oct 2024	Graakjaer Arena, Holstebro, Denmark	
13	Win	13–0	(France) Thomas Lacroix	TKO	2 (6), 2:13	21 Jun 2024	(United Kingdom) Bolton Whites Hotel, Bolton, England, UK	
12	Win	12–0	(Germany) Killian Weck	TKO	4 (6), 1:29	25 May 2024	Royal Arena, Copenhagen, Denmark	
11	Win	11–0	(United Kingdom) John Harding Jr	UD	8	12 Apr 2024	(United Kingdom) York Hall, London, England, UK	
10	Win	10–0	(Iran) Bahadur Karami	UD	6	10 Oct 2023	(United Kingdom) Brighton Centre, Brighton, England, UK	
9	Win	9–0	(Republic of Ireland) Jay Byrne	UD	4	15 Jul 2023	(United Kingdom) Vertu Motors Arena, Newcastle, England, UK	
8	Win	8–0	(Croatia) Frane Radnic	UD	4	24 Mar 2023	(United Kingdom) Bolton Whites Arena, Bolton, England, UK	
7	Win	7–0	(Kosovo) Novak Radulovic	UD	6	7 May 2022	(Germany) Sartory Sale Koln, Cologne	
6	Win	6–0	(Georgia (country)) Nika Gvajava	UD	4	3 Dec 2021	Harzlandhalle, Ilsenburg, Germany	
5	Win	5–0	(Slovakia) Pavol Garaj	UD	6	10 Sep 2021	Worthersee Stadium, Klagenfurt, Austria	
4	Win	4–0	(Serbia) Predrag Cvetkovic	UD	6	19 Jun 2021	Universum Gym, Hamburg, Germany	
3	Win	3–0	(Bulgaria) Konstantin Aleksandrov	UD	6	26 Sep 2020	Struer Arena, Stuer, Denmark	
2	Win	2–0	(Hungary) Attila Orsos	TKO	2 (4), 1:03	5 Oct 2019	Gilleleje Hallen, Gilleleje, Denmark	
1	Win	1–0	(Slovakia) Birkan Garip	TKO	1 (4) 2:58	4 Jul 2019	Ringriderteltet, Aabenraa, Denmark	
