= Germaine Brown =

English boxer (born 1994)

Personal information
- Nickname: G-Man
- Nationality: English
- Born: 31 May 1994 (age 32)
- Weight: Super-middleweight

Boxing career
- Stance: Orthodox

Boxing record
- Total fights: 19
- Wins: 15
- Win by KO: 6
- Losses: 4

Germaine Brown (born 31 May 1994) is an English professional boxer. He is a former English super-middleweight champion.

== Career ==
Having taken up boxing at the age of 16, Brown fought out of Fitzroy Lodge ABC in Lambeth as an amateur, winning the Novice London Championship and reaching the Boxing Alliance England final, as well as serving as a sparring partner for world champion George Groves.

He made his pro-debut at York Hall in London on 14 April 2018, defeating Nathan Halton on points in a four-round contest.

In his 10th fight in the paid ranks, Brown beat Jamal Le Doux on points at Wembley Arena on 2 October 2021, in a final eliminator for a shot at the English super-middleweight title.

He faced defending champion Charlie Schofield at Manchester Arena on 19 February 2022. Brown won by unanimous decision to claim the title.

Returning to Wembley Arena for his first defense on 11 June 2022, he lost the championship, and his unbeaten record, to Zak Chelli, going down to a unanimous decision defeat.

In his next outing, Brown challenged WBC International super-middleweight champion Ivan Zucco at the Allianz Cloud Arena in Milan, Italy, on 24 March 2023, but suffered a second straight unanimous decision loss.

He unsuccessfully attempted to become a two-time English super-middleweight title holder when he took on undefeated champion Mark Jeffers at the Echo Arena in Liverpool on 20 January 2024, again losing via unanimous decision in a bout which was also for the vacant Commonwealth Silver championship.
