= Zak Chelli =

English boxer (born 1997)

Personal information
- Born: 26 November 1997 (age 28) London, England
- Height: 6 ft 0 in (183 cm)
- Weight: Super middleweight; Light heavyweight

Boxing career
- Stance: Orthodox

Boxing record
- Total fights: 21
- Wins: 17
- Win by KO: 9
- Losses: 3
- Draws: 1

Zak Chelli (born 26 November 1997) is an English professional boxer. He has held the English light-heavyweight title since June 2025. Chelli is also a former British, Commonwealth, English and WBA Continental super-middleweight champion.

== Career ==
Chelli made his professional debut at York Hall in London on 24 February 2017, stopping Jacob Lucas in the third of their scheduled four-round encounter.

He won his first professional title in his eighth fight, claiming the vacant Southern Area super-middleweight crown with a unanimous decision victory over Jimmy Smith at Wembley Arena on 27 April 2019.

On 10 November 2020, Chelli defeated Vladimir Georgiev by unanimous decision and Mike McGoldrick via a second round stoppage at BT Sport Studio in Stratford to win the Boxxer VII tournament and secure a two-year contract with the promotional company.

He became English super-middleweight champion by dethroning Germaine Brown with a unanimous decision success at Wembley Arena on 11 June 2022.

At the same venue on 11 February 2023, Chelli took the WBA Continental super-middleweight title thanks to a unanimous decision win over Anthony Sims Jr.

He lost his English title to Mark Jeffers at Manchester Arena on 1 July 2023, going down to a unanimous decision defeat.

Chelli challenged British and Commonwealth super-middleweight champion Jack Cullen at Liverpool Arena on 20 January 2024, winning the bout by unanimous decision.

In his first defense at Oakwell Stadium in Barnsley on 3 August 2024, he lost his titles via unanimous decision to Callum Simpson.

After more than 10 months out of the competitive boxing ring, Chelli returned to face Adam Hepple for the vacant English light-heavyweight title at York Hall in London on 27 June 2025. Ahead on all three judges' scorecards and having already sent his opponent to the canvas in the ninth round, Chelli won the fight by knockout in the 10th and final round when Hepple failed to beat the referee's 10-count after being dropped by a punch to his body.

He took on former two-weight WBA (Regular) champion David Morrell at Co-op Live in Manchester on 9 May 2026. In a massive upset, Chelli won by technical knockout in the 10th and final round for the second bout in a row. While Morrell controlled most of the early portion of the fight, Chelli continued to land several overhand rights that gradually took their toll. Morrell came under major pressure at the end of the ninth and again in the 10th, the latter leading to a severe beating that prompted the referee to step in and stop the fight.

In November 2026, Chelli signed a multi-fight contract with Zuffa Boxing.

== Personal life ==
Chelli was born in England to a Tunisian father and Italian mother. His father, Zakaria Chelli, was a national boxer in Tunisia, before moving to Italy where he won a title. He has a degree in business, management and marketing from the University of Surrey and, after gaining a teaching qualification, began working as a substitute teacher during the COVID-19 lockdowns in 2020. Away from the boxing ring, he continues to be employed in teaching as of May 2026. Chelli is a keen chess player having taken up the boardgame while at school.

== Professional boxing record ==
21 fights	17 wins	3 losses
By knockout	9	0
By decision	8	3
Draws	1	

No.	Result	Record	Opponent	Type	Round, time	Date	Location	Notes
21	Win	17–3–1	David Morrell	TKO	10 (10), 2:24	9 May 2026	Co-op Live, Manchester, England	
20	Win	16–3–1	Adam Hepple	KO	10 (10), 0:29	27 Jun 2025	York Hall, London, England	Won vacant English light-heavyweight title
19	Loss	15–3–1	Callum Simpson	UD	12	3 Aug 2024	Oakwell Stadium, Barnsley, England	Lost British and Commonwealth super middleweight titles
18	Win	15–2–1	Jack Cullen	UD	12	20 Jan 2024	Echo Arena, Liverpool, England	Won British and Commonwealth super middleweight titles
17	Win	14–2–1	Jordan Grannum	KO	4 (4), 2:02	23 Sep 2023	York Hall, London, England	
16	Loss	13–2–1	Mark Jeffers	UD	10	1 Jul 2023	Manchester Arena, Manchester, England	Lost English super-middleweight title
15	Win	13–1–1	Anthony Sims Jr.	UD	10	11 Feb 2023	Wembley Arena, London, England	
14	Win	12–1–1	Germaine Brown	UD	10	11 Jun 2022	Wembley Arena, London, England	Won English super-middleweight title
13	Win	11–1–1	Jack Kilgannon	TKO	6 (8), 2:59	2 Apr 2022	Newcastle Arena, Newcastle, England	
12	Win	10–1–1	Bohdan Harkavyi	TKO	3 (6), 2:53	10 Apr 2021	Kyiv, Ukraine	
11	Win	9–1–1	Mike McGoldrick	TKO	2 (3), 1:31	10 Nov 2020	BT Sports Studio, London, England	
10	Win	8–1–1	Vladimir Georgiev	UD	3	10 Nov 2020	BT Sports Studio, London, England	
9	Draw	7–1–1	Jack Cullen	SD	10	22 Aug 2020	Matchroom Sport Headquarters, Brentwood, England	
8	Loss	7–1	Kody Davies	UD	10	14 Sep 2019	York Hall, London, England	
7	Win	7–0	Jimmy Smith	PTS	10	27 Apr 2019	Wembley Arena, London, England	Won Southern Area super-middleweight title.
6	Win	6–0	Ladislav Nemeth	TKO	1 (6), 0:59	9 Mar 2019	Woodside Leisure Centre, Watford, England	
5	Win	5–0	Umar Sadiq	PTS	8	20 Oct 2018	Brentwood Centre, Brentwood, England	
4	Win	4–0	Przemyslaw Binienda	TKO	2 (4), 2:16	2 Mar 2018	York Hall, London, England	
3	Win	3–0	Adam Jones	PTS	6	16 Sep 2017	Copper Box Arena, London, England	
2	Win	2–0	Chris Dutton	TKO	2 (4), 2:17	13 May 2017	First Direct Arena, Leeds, England	
1	Win	1–0	Jacob Lucas	TD	3 (4), 2:10	24 Feb 2017	York Hall, London, England	
