= Charlie Schofield =

English boxer (born 1993)

Personal information
- Born: 8 July 1993 (age 32) Ashton-under-Lyne, Lancashire, England
- Height: 6 ft 3 in (191 cm)
- Weight: Super-middleweight, Light-heavyweight, Cruiserweight

Boxing career
- Stance: Orthodox

Boxing record
- Total fights: 19
- Wins: 17
- Win by KO: 1
- Losses: 2

Charlie Schofield (born 8 July 1993) is an English former professional boxer. The highlight of his career was an eight-month reign as English super-middleweight champion.

== Career ==
Having started his professional career campaigning at cruiserweight and light-heavyweight, Schofield was unbeaten in his first 15 professional fights, before losing to Mickey Ellison on points in a super-middleweight contest at De Vere Whites in Bolton on 28 September 2019.

After almost 21 months out of the competitive ring, he faced Ellison in a rematch at Sheffield Arena Car Park on 4 June 2021, with the vacant English super-middleweight title on the line. This time Schofield won via unanimous decision to claim the championship.

He lost the title in his first defense against Germaine Brown at Manchester Arena on 19 February 2022, going down to a unanimous decision defeat.

Without fighting again, Schofield retired from professional boxing later in 2022 to focus on running his personal training business as well as organising white-collar boxing events.
