= Roamer Alexis Angulo =

Colombian boxer (born 1984)

Roamer Angulo
Personal information
- Nationality: Colombian
- Born: 25 March 1984 (age 42) Patía, Cauca, Colombia
- Height: 6 ft 1 in (185 cm)
- Weight: Super middleweight

Boxing career
- Reach: 75 in (191 cm)
- Stance: Orthodox

Boxing record
- Total fights: 30
- Wins: 27
- Win by KO: 23
- Losses: 3

Roamer Alexis Angulo (born 25 March 1984) is a Colombian professional boxer who challenged for the WBO super middleweight title in 2018 and the WBC super middleweight title in 2020.

== Professional career ==
Roamer turned professional in 2010 and won 23 fights in a row with 20 coming by way of Knockout. In his 24th fight he would earn his first world title opportunity against Mexican world champion Gilberto Ramírez.

== Professional boxing record ==
| 30 fights | 27 wins | 3 losses |
|---|---|---|
| By knockout | 23 | 1 |
| By decision | 4 | 2 |

| No. | Result | Record | Opponent | Type | Round, time | Date | Location | Notes |
|---|---|---|---|---|---|---|---|---|
| 30 | Loss | 27–3 | (United States) Edgar Berlanga | UD | 10 | 11 Jun 2022 | (United States) Hulu Theater, New York City, New York, U.S. | For NABO super middleweight title |
| 29 | Win | 27–2 | (Colombia) Carlos Galvan | RTD | 5 (8), 3:00 | 4 Jun 2021 | Hotel Catalonia Malecon Center, Santo Domingo, Dominican Republic | |
| 28 | Loss | 26–2 | (United States) David Benavidez | RTD | 10 (12), 3:00 | 15 Aug 2020 | (United States) Mohegan Sun Arena, Uncasville, Connecticut, US | For WBC super middleweight title |
| 27 | Win | 26–1 | (United States) Anthony Sims Jr. | SD | 10 | 30 Jan 2020 | (United States) Meridian at Island Gardens, Miami, Florida, US | Retained WBO Latino super middleweight title |
| 26 | Win | 25–1 | (Mexico) Javier Gomez Rueda | TKO | 1 (10), 2:56 | 14 Sep 2019 | Cancha Juanito Cabello, Cidra, Puerto Rico | |
| 25 | Win | 24–1 | (Venezuela) Reinaldo Gonzalez | KO | 4 (10), 0:57 | 21 Dec 2018 | Anthony Nesty sporthal, Paramaribo, Suriname | Won vacant WBC Latino and WBO interim Latino super middleweight titles |
| 24 | Loss | 23–1 | (Mexico) Gilberto Ramírez | UD | 12 | 30 Jun 2018 | (United States) Chesapeake Energy Arena, Oklahoma City, Oklahoma, US | For WBO super middleweight title |
| 23 | Win | 23–0 | (Colombia) Evert Bravo | KO | 1 (10), 2:02 | 24 Feb 2018 | Polyforum Zam Ná, Mérida, Mexico | Retained WBO Latino super middleweight title |
| 22 | Win | 22–0 | (Argentina) Rolando Mansilla | TKO | 2 (10), 0:24 | 27 May 2017 | Polyforum Zam Ná, Mérida, Mexico | Won vacant WBO Latino super middleweight title |
| 21 | Win | 21–0 | (Dominican Republic) Valerio Marte | TKO | 2 (8), 2:18 | 18 Apr 2017 | Casa de los Clubes, Santo Domingo, Dominican Republic | |
| 20 | Win | 20–0 | (Dominican Republic) Ramon Jimenez | TKO | 1 (8), 2:47 | 31 Mar 2017 | Coliseo Pepe Mayen, San Pedro de Macoris, Dominican Republic | |
| 19 | Win | 19–0 | (Hungary) Zoltan Papp | KO | 1 (12), 1:04 | 6 Aug 2016 | (United States) Miami Airport Convention Center, Miami, Florida, US | |
| 18 | Win | 18–0 | (Argentina) Claudio Ariel Abalos | UD | 8 | 1 Apr 2016 | (United States) War Memorial Auditorium, Fort Lauderdale, Florida, US | |
| 17 | Win | 17–0 | (Belgium) Matingu Kindele | TKO | 4 (8), 2:29 | 5 Dec 2015 | Saarlandhalle, Saarbrücken, Germany | |
| 16 | Win | 16–0 | (United States) Izaak Cardona | UD | 8 | 27 Aug 2015 | (United States) Show Palace, Oceanside, California, US | |
| 15 | Win | 15–0 | (Dominican Republic) Junior Ramos | TKO | 1 (8), 2:00 | 18 Nov 2014 | Sosua Club, Puerto Plata, Dominican Republic | |
| 14 | Win | 14–0 | (Bosnia and Herzegovina) Slavisa Simeunovic | RTD | 2 (10), 3:00 | 10 May 2014 | Ulm, Germany | |
| 13 | Win | 13–0 | (Germany) Surik Donsdean | TKO | 4 (8), 2:44 | 11 Apr 2014 | Universal Hall, Berlin, Germany | |
| 12 | Win | 12–0 | (Hungary) Sandor Micsko | TKO | 3 (8), 0:20 | 27 Sep 2013 | Atatürk Spor Salonu, Tekirdağ, Turkey | |
| 11 | Win | 11–0 | (Argentina) Dario Balmaceda | TKO | 2 (12), 2:25 | 27 Jul 2013 | Kugelbake-Halle, Cuxhaven, Germany | Won vacant IBF Latino super middleweight title |
| 10 | Win | 10–0 | (Hungary) Ferenc Hafner | KO | 3 (6), 2:55 | 4 May 2013 | Biosphaere, Potsdam, Germany | |
| 9 | Win | 9–0 | (Romania) Ionut Trandafir Ilie | KO | 2 (6), 1:21 | 23 Mar 2013 | Merkur Arena Luebbecke, Lübbecke, Germany | |
| 8 | Win | 8–0 | (Argentina) Jose Maria Caffarena | SD | 6 | 24 Nov 2012 | Club Huracán, Villaguay, Argentina | |
| 7 | Win | 7–0 | (Colombia) Alvaro Vargas | KO | 1 (8), 2:50 | 8 Sep 2012 | Coliseo de Combate, Cartagena, Colombia | |
| 6 | Win | 6–0 | (Colombia) Elias Ruiz | TKO | 2 (8), 1:50 | 4 Jun 2012 | Inbox Boxing Club, Bogotá, Colombia | |
| 5 | Win | 5–0 | (Colombia) Juan Villadiego | KO | 1 (8), 2:31 | 24 Mar 2012 | Gimnasio de Boxeo, Sahagún, Colombia | |
| 4 | Win | 4–0 | (Colombia) Segundo Herrera | TKO | 4 (6), 2:58 | 15 Sep 2011 | Gimnasio In Box, Bogotá, Colombia | |
| 3 | Win | 3–0 | (Colombia) Leonardo Julio | KO | 1 (4), 2:00 | 29 Jul 2011 | Coliseo "Happy" Lora, Montería, Colombia | |
| 2 | Win | 2–0 | (Dominican Republic) Aneudy Marte | TKO | 1 (4), 1:23 | 29 Nov 2010 | Coliseo Pepe Mayen, San Pedro de Macorís, Dominican Republic | |
| 1 | Win | 1–0 | (Dominican Republic) Jose Felix | TKO | 1 (4), 2:31 | 18 Sep 2010 | Coliseo Carlos 'Teo' Cruz, Santo Domingo, Dominican Republic | |
