= Maciej Sulęcki =

Polish boxer (born 1989)

Personal information
- Nickname: Striczu
- Nationality: Polish
- Born: 2 May 1989 (age 37) Warsaw, Poland
- Height: 1.85 m (6 ft 1 in)
- Weight: Light-middleweight; Middleweight; Super-middleweight

Boxing career
- Reach: 173 cm (68 in)
- Stance: Orthodox

Boxing record
- Total fights: 37
- Wins: 33
- Win by KO: 13
- Losses: 4

Maciej Sulęcki (born 2 May 1989) is a Polish professional boxer who challenged for the WBO middleweight title in 2019.

== Amateur career ==
Sulecki had a 110–30 record as an amateur, becoming a three-time Polish Junior champion.

== Professional career ==
Sulęcki made his professional debut in June 2010, defeating Adam Gawlik by knockout in the first round in Kielce, Poland. In June 2012, Sulęcki defeated former welterweight world champion Yuriy Nuzhnenko with a unanimous decision.

Over the next three years Sulęcki put together 15 straight victories before fighting for his first title in November 2013, against Lukasz Wawrzyczek for the vacant Republic of Poland middleweight title. Sulęcki won by unanimous decision. In May 2014, he added the Polish International super-middleweight title to that by beating Nicolas Dion of France over ten rounds.

Sulęcki then faced former European champion and WBA middleweight world title challenger Grzegorz Proksa at the Krakow Arena, Poland in November 2014. Sulęcki was victorious in the all-Polish affair, stopping Proksa in the seventh round. Proksa's unorthodox style gave Sulęcki some trouble early on but as the fight went on, Sulęcki started landing more effective shots and ended the fight with a right-hand counterpunch.

Following that victory, the Pole teamed up with promoter Lou DiBella and manager Al Haymon and made his US debut against Darryl Cunningham at the UIC Pavilion, Chicago in April 2015. Sulęcki again won by knockout, this time in the third round.

Sulęcki then stopped 40-year-old Jose Miguel Berrio, late replacement for Eduardo Tercero, at the Prudential Center. Sulęcki landed a number left hooks under the right elbow of Rodriguez and the referee stopped the fight before the end of the first round. Following this victory Sulecki was added as a contender for Sherdog's Top 10 middleweights list.

In 2016, Sulęcki defeated previously unbeaten prospect Hugo Centeno Jr. with a knockout in the final round of a ten-round bout. This was Sulęcki's fifth consecutive knockout after only scoring three stoppages in his first eighteen fights. Sulęcki moved down to light-middleweight in 2017. In October, he fought Jack Culcay, backing up the World Boxing Super Series quarter-final match between Krzysztof Włodarczyk and Murat Gassiev. Sulęcki beat Culcay with a unanimous decision (98-92, 97-93, 96-94).

After that, Sulecki fought former world middleweight champion Daniel Jacobs, who was ranked #2 by the WBA and WBO and #3 by the WBC and IBF at the time. He went on to lose the bout by unanimous decision.

In his next fight in the States, Sulecki defeated Puerto Rican veteran Gabriel Rosado in a grudgematch. This win eventually led him to a #2 ranking by the WBO and a mandatory world-title fight against Demetrius Andrade. Andrade would end up being too much for the Pole, taking away every round from him, while also dropping him to the canvas in the process.

Sulecki faced Diego Pacheco in Carson, CA on August 31, 2024. This fight was for both the WBC USA and WBO International super middleweight titles Sulecki lost the fight via KO after a left body hook knocked him down in the sixth round

== Professional boxing record ==
37 fights	33 wins	4 losses
By knockout	13	2
By decision	20	2

No.	Result	Record	Opponent	Type	Round, time	Date	Location	Notes
37	Loss	33–4	Christian M'billi	KO	1 (12), 2:28	27 Jun 2025	Videotron Centre, Quebec City, Canada	For vacant WBC interim super middleweight title
36	Win	33–3	Ali Akhmedov	TKO	10 (10), 0:14	28 Feb 2025	Qazaqstan Track and Field Arena, Astana, Kazakhstan	Won vacant WBC Silver super middleweight title
35	Loss	32–3	Diego Pachecho	KO	6 (12), 0:54	31 Aug 2024	Dignity Health Sports Park, Carson, California, U.S.	For WBC and WBO International super middleweight titles
34	Win	32–2	Rowdy Legend Montgomery	UD	10	31 May 2024	Melrose Ballroom, Queens, New York, U.S.	
33	Win	31–2	Angel Hernandez	KO	2 (8), 0:16	9 Jun 2023	Turning Stone Resort & Casino, Verona, New York, U.S.	
32	Win	30–2	Fouad El Massoudi	UD	8	17 Dec 2021	Hala WOSiR, Wyszków, Poland	
31	Win	29–2	Sasha Yengoyan	UD	10	29 Aug 2020	Arena Suwałki, Suwałki, Poland	
30	Loss	28–2	Demetrius Andrade	UD	12	29 Jun 2019	Dunkin' Donuts Center, Providence, Rhode Island, US	For WBO middleweight title
29	Win	28–1	Gabriel Rosado	UD	10	15 Mar 2019	Liacouras Center, Philadelphia, Pennsylvania, US	Won vacant WBO International middleweight title
28	Win	27–1	Jean Michel Hamilcaro	TKO	2 (10), 2:33	10 Nov 2018	Arena Gliwice, Gliwice, Poland	
27	Loss	26–1	Daniel Jacobs	UD	12	28 Apr 2018	Barclays Center, New York City, New York, US	
26	Win	26–0	Jack Culcay	UD	10	21 Oct 2017	Prudential Center, Newark, New Jersey, US	
25	Win	25–0	Damián Bonelli	TKO	3 (10), 2:54	24 Jun 2017	Ergo Arena, Gdańsk, Poland	
24	Win	24–0	Michi Muñoz	KO	3 (10), 2:03	8 Apr 2017	Nosalowy Dwór, Zakopane, Poland	
23	Win	23–0	Hugo Centeno Jr.	TKO	10 (10), 1:06	18 Jun 2016	UIC Pavilion, Chicago, Illinois, US	
22	Win	22–0	Derrick Findley	TKO	7 (8), 1:29	16 Jan 2016	Barclays Center, New York City, New York, US	
21	Win	21–0	Jose Miguel Berrio	TKO	1 (8), 2:07	14 Aug 2015	Prudential Center, Newark, New Jersey, US	
20	Win	20–0	Darryl Cunningham	KO	3 (8), 2:59	24 Apr 2015	UIC Pavilion, Chicago, Illinois, US	
19	Win	19–0	Grzegorz Proksa	TKO	7 (10), 2:57	8 Nov 2014	Kraków Arena, Kraków, Poland	
18	Win	18–0	Nicolas Dion	UD	10	10 May 2014	Hala OSiR, Brodnica, Poland	Won Republic of Poland International super-middleweight title
17	Win	17–0	Howard Cospolite	UD	10	1 Mar 2014	HALA OSiR, Suwałki, Poland	
16	Win	16–0	Lukasz Wawrzyczek	UD	10	9 Nov 2013	Sport Hall, Ełk, Poland	Won vacant Republic of Poland middleweight title
15	Win	15–0	Daniel Urbanski	UD	6	29 Jun 2013	Amfiteatr, Ostróda, Poland	
14	Win	14–0	Francis Tchoffo	UD	8	10 May 2013	Urania Hall, Olsztyn, Poland	
13	Win	13–0	Robert Swierzbinski	UD	8	23 Feb 2013	Ergo Arena, Gdańsk, Poland	
12	Win	12–0	Andrejs Loginovs	PTS	6	16 Nov 2012	Hotel Trylogia, Zielonka, Poland	
11	Win	11–0	Dzianis Makar	TKO	5 (6), 2:26	27 Oct 2012	Sport Hall, Częstochowa, Poland	
10	Win	10–0	Yuriy Nuzhnenko	UD	6	1 Jun 2012	Sport Hall, Rzeszów, Poland	
9	Win	9–0	Jetmir Kuqi	UD	6	17 Feb 2012	Urania Hall, Olsztyn, Poland	
8	Win	8–0	Fehti Bentafna	UD	6	26 Nov 2011	Lodowisko MOSiR, Białystok, Poland	
7	Win	7–0	Mika Joensuu	UD	6	5 Aug 2011	Hala Polonia, Częstochowa, Poland	
6	Win	6–0	Endrit Vuka	UD	6	25 Jun 2011	Sport Hall, Ostrowiec Świętokrzyski, Poland	
5	Win	5–0	Dzianis Makar	TKO	5 (6), 2:44	11 Mar 2011	Hala Urania, Olsztyn, Poland	
4	Win	4–0	Sergejs Savrinovics	UD	4	12 Nov 2010	Salt Mine, Wieliczka, Poland	
3	Win	3–0	Deniss Sirjatovs	UD	4	17 Sep 2010	Hala Urania, Olsztyn, Poland	
2	Win	2–0	Andrejs Loginovs	UD	4	18 Aug 2010	Amfiteatr, Międzyzdroje, Poland	
1	Win	1–0	Adam Gawlik	TKO	1 (4), 2:16	19 Jun 2010	MOSiR, Kielce, Poland	

== Bare-knuckle boxing record ==
Professional record breakdown
1 match	0 wins	1 loss
By knockout	0	0
By decision	0	1

Res.	Record	Opponent	Method	Event	Date	Round	Time	Location	Notes
Loss	0–1	Kacper Formela	Decision (majority)	Fight Mode 1	May 23, 2026	5	3:00	Poznań, Poland	

== Custom rules record ==
1 fight	0 wins	1 loss
By decision	0	1

No.	Result	Record	Opponent	Type	Round, time	Date	Location	Notes
1	Loss	0–1	Norman Parke	SD	5	9 Dec 2023	Atlas Arena, Łódź, Poland	5 alternating rounds between boxing and K-1 rules.

Regional boxing titles
Vacant Title last held by Jaime Munguia	WBC Silver super middleweight champion February 28, 2015 – present	Incumbent
