= Mark Heffron =

English boxer (born 1991)

Personal information
- Nickname: Kid Dynamite
- Born: 18 November 1991 (age 34) Oldham, Greater Manchester, England
- Height: 5 ft 11 in (180 cm)
- Weight: Light Middleweight Middleweight Super Middleweight

Boxing career
- Reach: 72 in (183 cm)
- Stance: Orthodox

Boxing record
- Total fights: 35
- Wins: 30
- Win by KO: 24
- Losses: 4
- Draws: 1
Medal record
Men's amateur boxing
Representing England
European Youth Championships
Silver medal – second place	2009 Szczecin	Light-welterweight

Mark Heffron (born 18 November 1991) is an English former professional boxer. He held the British and Commonwealth super-middleweight titles between 2022 and September 2023. As an amateur he won a silver medal at the 2009 European Youth Championships.

== Professional career ==
Heffron made his professional debut on 4 September 2010, scoring a second-round knockout (KO) victory against Torsten Roos at the Bekkerveld Festival in Heerlen, Netherlands.

After compiling a record of 19–0 (15 KOs), he defeated Andrew Robinson via sixth-round technical knockout (TKO) on 9 June 2018 at the Manchester Arena, capturing the vacant WBC International middleweight title. The bout served as part of the undercard for Tyson Fury's comeback fight against Sefer Seferi.

Following a fourth-round TKO victory against Aryee Ayittey in October, Heffron returned to the Manchester Arena to face former British super-welterweight champion Liam Williams for the vacant British middleweight title on 22 December, serving as part of the undercard for Josh Warrington's world title defence against Carl Frampton. After nine rounds of action Heffron was well behind on the scorecards. In the tenth, he was caught with a punch which prompted Williams to launch a sustained attack and force referee Howard Foster to issue a standing eight count. The fight resumed, only to be stopped moments later after Heffron was again on the receiving end of a barrage of punches, prompting Foster to call a halt to the contest to hand Heffron the first defeat of his career via tenth-round TKO.

Heffron won the British and Commonwealth super middleweight titles by stopping defending champion Lennox Clarke in the fifth round of their contest at the Copper Box Arena in London on 16 July 2022.

He lost the titles in his first defense against Jack Cullen at Manchester Arena on 2 September 2023 via technical knockout in round three.

Heffron challenged Christian M'billi for the WBC Continental Americas and WBA International super-middleweight titles at Centre Gervais Auto in Shawinigan, Canada,on 25 May 2024. He was knocked out after just 40 seconds of the opening round.

Having not fought again, Heffron officially announced his retirement from professional boxing in January 2025. He subsequently set up a window cleaning business.

== Professional boxing record ==
35 fights	30 wins	4 losses
By knockout	24	4
By decision	6	0
Draws	1	

No.	Result	Record	Opponent	Type	Round, time	Date	Location	Notes
35	Loss	30–4–1	Christian M'billi	KO	1 (10), 0:40	25 May 2024	Centre Gervais Auto, Shawinigan, Canada	For WBC Continental Americas and WBA International super-middleweight titles
34	Win	30–3–1	Serhii Ksendzov	TKO	2 (6), 2:43	23 Feb 2024	Oldham Leisure Centre, Oldham, England	
33	Loss	29–3–1	Jack Cullen	TKO	3 (12), 2:43	2 Sep 2023	Manchester Arena, Manchester, England	Lost the British and Commonwealth super-middleweight titles
32	Win	29–2–1	Martin Ezequiel Bulacio	TKO	1 (8), 1:13	24 Sep 2022	AO Arena, Manchester, England	
31	Win	28–2–1	Lennox Clarke	TKO	5 (12), 2:28	16 Jul 2022	Copper Box Arena, London, England	Won British, Commonwealth, and vacant IBF Inter-Continental super-middleweight titles
30	Win	27–2–1	Tomas Bezvoda	TKO	3 (8), 1:02	19 Mar 2022	Oldham Leisure Centre, Oldham, England	
29	Win	26–2–1	Farouk Daku	TKO	3 (6), 0:35	16 Oct 2021	Oldham Leisure Centre, Oldham, England	
28	Loss	25–2–1	Denzel Bentley	RTD	4 (12), 3:00	13 Nov 2020	BT Sport Studios, London, England	For vacant British middleweight title
27	Draw	25–1–1	Denzel Bentley	UD	10	12 Sep 2020	York Hall, London, England	
26	Win	25–1	Ondrej Budera	TKO	1 (6), 0:59	22 Feb 2020	Oldham Leisure Centre, Oldham, England	
25	Win	24–1	Rui Manuel Pavanito	TKO	1 (6), 3:00	12 Oct 2019	First Direct Arena, Leeds, England	
24	Win	23–1	Daniel Urbanski	PTS	6	15 Jun 2019	First Direct Arena, Leeds, England	
23	Win	22–1	Serge Ambomo	PTS	6	16 Mar 2019	Oldham Leisure Centre, Oldham, England	
22	Loss	21–1	Liam Williams	TKO	10 (12), 1:55	22 Dec 2018	Manchester Arena, Manchester, England	For vacant British middleweight title
21	Win	21–0	Aryee Atittey	TKO	4 (8), 2:53	6 Oct 2018	Morningside Arena, Leicester, England	
20	Win	20–0	Andrew Robinson	TKO	6 (10), 2:02	9 Jun 2018	Manchester Arena, Manchester, England	Won vacant WBC International middleweight title
19	Win	19–0	Adam Grabiec	TKO	4 (6), 2:30	19 May 2018	Elland Road, Leeds, England	
18	Win	18–0	Lewis Taylor	TKO	7 (8), 2:03	11 Nov 2017	Metro Radio Arena, Newcastle, England	
17	Win	17–0	Istvan Zeller	PTS	4	29 Jul 2017	Oldham Leisure Centre, Oldham, England	
16	Win	16–0	Bartolomiej Grafka	PTS	6	17 Jun 2017	Victoria Warehouse, Manchester, England	
15	Win	15–0	Achilles Szabo	TKO	2 (8), 1:55	8 Apr 2017	Manchester Arena, Manchester, England	
14	Win	14–0	Christian Hoskin-Gomez	TKO	2 (6), 0:33	24 Feb 2017	Middleton Arena, Middleton, England	
13	Win	13–0	Michael Mora	TKO	3 (4), 0:30	26 Nov 2016	Fusion Nightclub, Liverpool, England	
12	Win	12–0	Attila Tabor Nagy	TKO	2 (4), 1:12	5 Nov 2016	Middleton Arena, Middleton, England	
11	Win	11–0	Raimonds Sniedze	TKO	2 (6), 2:05	31 Oct 2015	Civic Hall, Radcliffe, England	
10	Win	10–0	Janos Olah	KO	1 (6)	1 Aug 2015	Hotel Holyday World, Benalmádena, Spain	
9	Win	9–0	Mateo Veron	PTS	8	15 Feb 2014	National Stadium, Dublin, Ireland	
8	Win	8–0	Achilles Szabo	TKO	1 (8), 0:30	22 Nov 2013	Bowlers Exhibition Centre, Manchester, England	
7	Win	7–0	Julio Acosta	KO	2 (6)	18 Oct 2013	La Farga, L'Hospitalet de Llobregat, Spain	
6	Win	6–0	Fehti Bentafna	TKO	1 (6)	17 Mar 2012	Wellness Profi Center, Purmerend, Netherlands	
5	Win	5–0	David Pulido	TKO	3 (6)	19 Mar 2011	City West Hotel, Dublin, Ireland	
4	Win	4–0	Chris O'Brien	TKO	1 (4), 1:10	13 Nov 2010	M.E.N. Arena, Manchester, England	
3	Win	3–0	Attila Molnar	TKO	1 (4)	2 Oct 2010	László Papp Sporthalle, Szentes, Hungary	
2	Win	2–0	Arek Malek	UD	4	17 Sep 2010	Hala Urania, Olsztyn, Poland	
1	Win	1–0	Torsten Roos	KO	2 (4)	4 Sep 2010	Bekkerveld Festival, Heerlen, Netherlands	
