= List of current WBC Youth world champions =

This is a list of current WBC Youth world champions. The Youth title is one of the World Boxing Council's minor world championships for young up-and-coming professional boxers.

Weight class	Champion	Record	Defenses
Heavyweight			
Bridgerweight	(Croatia) Lovro Pavcec	10-0-0 (8 KOs)	0
Cruiserweight			
Light heavyweight	(China) Saipaier Rouzi	7–0–1 (6 KOs)	0
Super middleweight	vacant		
Middleweight	(Germany) Sami Ahmeti	10–0–1 (5 KOs)	0
Super welterweight	(France) Enzo Marguerite	9–0 (3 KOs)	0
Welterweight	(Algeria) Mohammed Sahnoun	8–0 (6 KOs)	0
Super lightweight	(Slovenia) Nejc Petric	8–0 (7 KOs)	0
Lightweight	vacant		
Super featherweight			
Featherweight	(Venezuela) Alexander Jimenez	13-0-1 (8 KOs)	0
Super bantamweight	(China) Hanle Xie	7-1-0 (4 KOs)	0
Bantamweight	(France) Ibrahim Boukedim	7-0-0 (0 KOs)	1
Super flyweight	(Japan) Reon Fujino	10-0–1 (6 KOs)	2
Flyweight	vacant		
Light flyweight	(South Africa) Siseko Teyisi	10-0-0 (7 KOs)	0
Strawweight	(Japan) Rento Miyazawa	9-3-2 (3 KOs)	0

== See also ==
- List of WBC world champions
- List of current WBC International champions
