= Kévin Lele Sadjo =

French boxer (born 1990)

Personal information
- Nicknames: The Punisher; The Phenomen
- Nationality: French
- Born: Kévin Lele Sadjo; April 6, 1990 (age 36) Yaoundé, Cameroon
- Height: 1.73 m (5 ft 8 in)
- Weight: Light heavyweight; Super middleweight

Boxing career
- Reach: 173 cm (68 in)
- Stance: Orthodox

Boxing record
- Total fights: 31
- Wins: 30
- Win by KO: 25
- Losses: 1

Kévin Lele Sadjo (born 6 January 1990) is a Cameroonian-born French professional boxer. He held the EBU Super middleweight title from 2021 to 2025.

== Amateur career ==
On 3 December 2016, Sadjo fought fellow Cameroonian-French Christian M'billi at the Final amateur bout for 2016 Olympics qualifiers in Montargis, France in which Sadjo fell short on points. Furthermore, Sadjo fought against Bulgarian Radoslav Pantaleev in the 2017 World Series of Boxing, unfortunately losing via 5-rounds unanimous decision.

== Professional career ==
=== Early years ===
==== Sadjo vs. Ismailov ====
On 20 January 2018, after composing a record of 4–0 all by knockouts, Sadjo was matched up against the reigning FFB super middleweight champion Shamil Ismailov for the French super middleweight crown at Levallois-Perret in Paris. Sadjo dethroned the opposition, stopping Ismailov in the fourth round with 10-seconds left in the round.

On 30 March 2018, Sadjo defended his title against journeyman Matiouze Royer in Palais des sports Marcel-Cerdan. Sadjo won via third-round TKO.

==== Sadjo vs. Sequeira ====
On 20 July 2019, Sadjo challenged regional challenger and the reigning WBC Latino light heavyweight champion Walter Gabriel Sequeira for the vacant WBA Inter-Continental super middleweight crown in Palais des Sports de Marseille for 12 rounds, Sadjo stopped Sequeira in the tenth-round.

==== Sadjo vs. Mansilla ====
On 16 November 2019, Sadjo made the first defence of his WBA crown against Argentine and reigning WBO Latino super middleweight champion Rolando Wenceslao Mansilla, Sadjo retained his title with a first-round TKO victory inside 1 minute and 11 seconds after Mansilla sustained fibular fracture and ankle sprain.

==== Sadjo vs. Landaeta ====
After a year of inactivity due to the COVID-19 pandemic, Sadjo defended his WBA Inter-Continental crown on 5 December 2020, Sadjo fought Spanish-Venezuelan contender Ronny Landaeta for the vacant title at Levallois-Perret, Sadjo outscored the challenger over ten rounds.

=== European super middleweight champion ===
==== Sadjo vs. Cullen ====
After Lerrone Richards lost the EBU super middleweight title in a bid for the IBO world championship, the European championship turned vacant again. The EBU ordered the vacant title to be fought for by English contender Jack Cullen and the short-notice foe Sadjo on 18 December 2021 at the AO Arena, in the undercard of the Joseph Parker vs. Derek Chisora II event, Sadjo landed a vicious body shot that dropped and stunned Cullen en route to referee John Latham halting the contest a decision justified by Cullen having to lay down for several minutes in the canvas. As Sadjo's triumph fills the air of the arena in Manchester, Sadjo sparked controversy as he celebrated by screaming in overjoy and later began showboating with press-ups as Cullen received a medical check which caused the crowd to go furious and started booing and Sadjo even earned a warning from the referee himself.

==== Sadjo vs. Cukur ====
In July 2022, Sadjo was announced to make his first defense of his continental crown against Turkish-German contender Emre Cukur, set for 17 September 2022 at Créteil, France. However the match was postponed and moved to November 19, in which, both fighters had a tune-up fight with Sadjo stopping overmatched Georgian Badri Gogichasvili in August 15 and Cukur tying with veteran French campaigner Hadillah Mohoumadi. Sadjo retained his European crown via seventh-round TKO.

==== Sadjo vs. Elbir ====
On 28 May 2023 in Créteil, France, Sadjo battles against Turkish Zeynel (Sven) Elbir for the vacant WBO Inter-Continental super middleweight title, Sadjo won via seventh-round TKO.

==== Sadjo vs. De Carolis ====
Sadjo challenged long time super middleweight contender, former WBA world champion and Italian veteran Giovanni De Carolis in bid for Sadjo's European belt at Marseille, however, De Carolis had to withdraw after sustaining a shoulder injury, thus, Sadjo defended his WBO Inter-Continental title instead against late-replacement Argentine Abraham Gabriel Buonarrigo, whereas, Sadjo won via fourth-round TKO. Sadjo's defense against De Carolis was then set at the prestigious Palais des sports Marcel-Cerdan in Levallois-Perret on 9 March 2024, Sadjo defeated the long-time warrior via eighth-round stoppage.

==== Sadjo vs. Palacio ====
On 13 June 2024, Sadjo fought the Argentine light heavyweight champion Durval Elias Palacio for the vacant WBC Silver super middleweight title in Zénith Paris, Sadjo won via unanimous decision.

==== Sadjo vs. Chaves ====
On 14 December 2024, Sadjo squared-off against former WBA Interim welterweight champion Diego Chaves in Grand Hyatt Baha Mar at Nassau, The Bahamas, Sadjo stopped Chaves in the fourth round.

=== Post-European super middleweight championship ===
==== Cancelled bout vs. M'billi ====
On 9 January 2025, the IBF ordered a title eliminator bout between Sadjo and amateur rival Christian M'billi in which, a purse bid will have to take place. On 30 January 2025, it was announced that Sadjo's promoter Yohan Zaoui of Y12 Promotions won the purse bid via posting a bid of $878,000 to outbid M'billi's Eye of the Tiger Promotions' bid of $767,000 and therefore gained promotional rights and set the contest on May in Paris, France. Next month however, the bout would be in "jeopardy" after Eye of the Tiger Promotions' president Camille Estephan stated: "We have suffered an injustice and we do not accept it," Estephan also added that there are other avenues just as interesting for M'Billi, Estephan's decline was thoroughly stated at The Ring's report, the report stated that Estephan felt duped after Y12 Promotions released a poster with the "May" date in place, beyond the 90-days deadline, which was granted by the IBF, the bout was supposedly taking place on 8 May the Victory Day in France and other European nations. M'Billi instead pursued the WBC route as he was the number 1 contender in it.

==== Sadjo vs. Ahmed ====
On 10 May 2025, in the Cissokho-Kavaliauskas boxing card, Sadjo fought 30–3–1 former world title-challenger Ghanaian Habib Ahmed for 10 rounds in Malabo, Equatorial Guinea. Sadjo knocked Ahmed out with a body shot in the third round, the supposedly 10-rounds bout was just for eight rounds at the two videos released of the bout in Dailymotion.

==== Sadjo vs. Pacheco ====
Despite knocking his opponent to the canvas in the eighth round, Sadjo lost his WBC Silver super-middleweight title, and unbeaten professional record, to Diego Pacheco via unanimous decision at Stockton Arena in Stockton, California, USA, on 13 December 2025.

== Professional boxing record ==
31 fights	30 wins	1 loss
By knockout	25	0
By decision	5	1

No.	Result	Record	Opponent	Type	Round, time	Date	Location	Notes
31	Win	30–1	Adrian Cota	UD	10	4 Jul 2026	Palais des Sports Robert Oubron, Créteil, France	Retained WBA Continental Gold super middleweight title
30	Win	29–1	Abdul Ubaya	UD	10	10 Jun 2026	Abidjan, Cote D'Ivoire	
29	Win	28–1	Alaa AlMahmoud	TKO	8 (12), 2:17	27 Mar 2026	Palais des Sports, Caen, France	Won inaugural WBA Continental Gold super middleweight title
28	Win	27–1	Pavel Albrecht	TKO	2 (10)	7 Feb 2026	Salle Pierre Jablonski, Châteauroux, France	
27	Loss	26–1	Diego Pacheco	UD	12	13 Dec 2025	Stockton Arena, Stockton, California, U.S.	Lost WBC Silver super middleweight title; For WBO International super middleweight title
26	Win	26–0	Martín Ezequiel Bulacio	RTD	4 (10), 3:00	28 Aug 2025	Salle du Casino, Enghien, France	
25	Win	25–0	Habib Ahmed	KO	3 (10), 2:04	10 May 2025	Centre de Conférence de Sipopo, Malabo, Equatorial Guinea	
24	Win	24–0	Diego Chaves	TKO	4 (10), 2:11	14 Dec 2024	Grand Hyatt Baha Mar, Nassau, The Bahamas	
23	Win	23–0	Durval Elías Palacio	UD	12	13 Jun 2024	Zénith, Paris, France	Won vacant WBC Silver super middleweight title
22	Win	22–0	Giovanni De Carolis	TKO	8 (12), 2:21	9 Mar 2024	Palais des sports Marcel-Cerdan, Paris, France	Retained European super middleweight title
21	Win	21–0	Abraham Gabriel Buonarrigo	TKO	4 (12)	2 Dec 2023	Palais des Sports, Marseille, France	Retained WBO Inter-Continental super middleweight title
20	Win	20–0	Zeynel Elbir	TKO	7 (12), 2:11	28 May 2023	Palais des Sports Robert Oubron, Créteil, France	Won vacant WBO Inter-Continental super middleweight title
19	Win	19–0	Emre Çukur	TKO	7 (12)	19 Nov 2022	La Palestre, Le Cannet, France	Retained European super middleweight title
18	Win	18–0	Badri Gogichasvili	TKO	3 (10)	15 Aug 2022	Palais des Festivals, Cannes, France	
17	Win	17–0	Jack Cullen	TKO	6 (12), 1:11	18 Dec 2021	AO Arena, Manchester, England	Won vacant European super middleweight title
16	Win	16–0	Javier Francisco Maciel	UD	8	17 Jul 2021	Stade du Heysel, Brussels, Belgium	
15	Win	15–0	Ronny Landaeta	UD	10	5 Dec 2020	Palais des sports Marcel-Cerdan, Parsi, France	Retained WBA Inter-Continental super middleweight title
14	Win	14–0	Rolando Wenceslao Mansilla	TKO	1 (12), 1:11	16 Nov 2019	Palais des sports Marcel-Cerdan, Paris, France	Retained WBA Inter-Continental super middleweight title
13	Win	13–0	Walter Gabriel Sequeira	TKO	10 (12), 1:08	20 Jul 2019	Palais des Sports, Marseille, France	Won vacant WBA Inter-Continental super middleweight title
12	Win	12–0	John Cortez	TKO	2 (8)	29 Jul 2019	Arènes, Fréjus, France	
11	Win	11–0	David Radeff	TKO	8 (8)	15 Jun 2019	Patinoire, Amiens, France	
10	Win	10–0	Nika Gvajava	RTD	3 (6), 3:00	30 Mar 2019	Centre Pierre Brossolette, Saint-Maur-des-Fossés, France	
9	Win	9–0	Sadok Sebki	TKO	4 (6)	22 Feb 2019	Château des Rochers, Nogent-sur-Oise, France	
8	Win	8–0	Djordje Marković	TKO	2 (6), 1:52	20 Oct 2018	Canal Olympia, Dakar, Senegal	
7	Win	7–0	Miloš Pavićević	TKO	3 (6)	12 May 2018	Gymnase Cosec, Cosne-Cours-sur-Loire, France	
6	Win	6–0	Matiouze Royer	TKO	3 (10)	20 Mar 2018	Palais des sports Marcel-Cerdan, Paris, France	Retained French super middleweight title
5	Win	5–0	Shamil Ismailov	TKO	4 (10), 2:50	20 Jan 2018	Palais des sports Marcel-Cerdan, Paris, France	Won vacant French super middleweight title
4	Win	4–0	Otari Gogoberishvili	TKO	4 (6)	8 Dec 2017	Salle jean Vilain, Fréjus, France	
3	Win	3–0	Gabriel Lecrosnier	KO	1 (6)	11 Nov 2017	Vélodrome de Saint-Quentin-en-Yvelines, Montigny-le-Bretonneux, France	
2	Win	2–0	Uladzimir Kharkevich	TKO	2 (6)	22 Jul 2017	Salle Roger Maillaud, Nouzonville, France	
1	Win	1–0	Andrejs Loginovs	TKO	2 (6)	17 Jul 2017	Salle Jean Cochet, Chartres, France	

== Personal life ==
Sadjo was born in the Cameroon capital Yaoundé and currently resides in Créteil, France, he studied AEI at Paris-East Créteil University.
