= Christian M'billi =

Cameroon-born French boxer (born 1995)

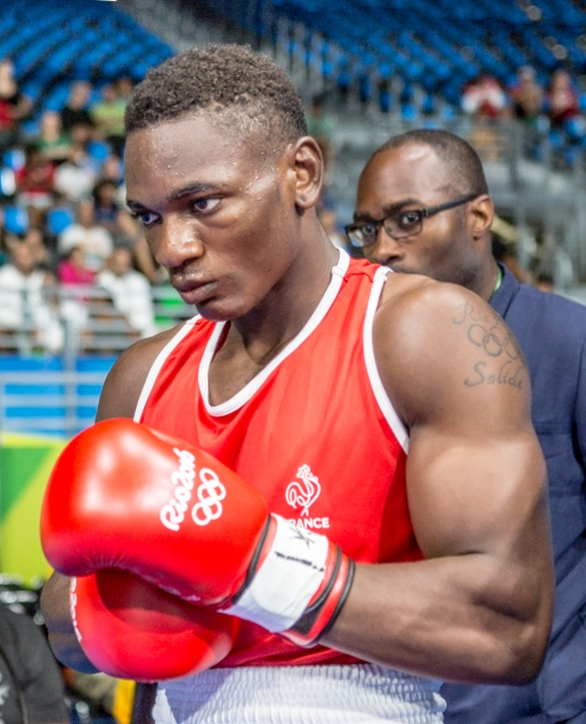
- M'billi at the 2016 Summer Olympics

Personal information
- Nickname: Solide ("Solid")
- Citizenship: Cameroon; France; Canada (since 2023)
- Born: Christian Mbilli Assomo-Hallier; 26 April 1995 (age 31) Yaoundé, Cameroon
- Height: 5 ft 8 1/2 in (174 cm)
- Weight: Middleweight; Super middleweight

Boxing career
- Reach: 72 in (183 cm)
- Stance: Orthodox

Boxing record
- Total fights: 31
- Wins: 29
- Win by KO: 24
- Losses: 1
- Draws: 1

Christian M'billi Assomo-Hallier (born 26 April 1995) is a professional boxer. He previously held the World Boxing Council (WBC) super-middleweight title in 2026.

== Professional career ==
=== Rise up the ranks ===
==== M'billi vs. Derevyanchenko ====
M'billi faced Sergiy Derevyanchenko at Videotron Centre in Quebec City, Canada on August 17, 2024. M'billi won the contest after ten rounds via unanimous decision (100–90, 99–91, 98–92). Derevyanchenko suffered a significant bicep injury during the bout.

M'billi was scheduled to face Kévin Lele Sadjo in the IBF super middleweight title eliminator on May 8, 2025, in Paris, France. On February 18, 2025, it was reported that the fight was canceled due to financial issues.

=== WBC interim super middleweight champion ===
==== M'billi vs. Sulęcki ====
M'billi was scheduled to face Maciej Sulęcki for the interim WBC super middleweight title on June 27, 2025, in Québec City, Canada. M'billi won the fight via stoppage in the first round.

==== M'billi vs. Martínez ====
M'billi was scheduled to defend his WBC interim super middleweight title against Lester Martínez in Las Vegas, on September 13, 2025. The fight ended in a split draw, therefore M'billi retained the title.

=== WBC super middleweight champion ===
On January 27, 2026, it was announced that Christian Mbilli had been elevated to WBC super middleweight champion after the title was vacated by Terence Crawford, and Mbilli's ordered fight against Hamzah Sheeraz did not take place.

==== Álvarez vs. Mbili ====
On 30 April, Ring Magazine officially announced that Canelo Álvarez would challenge M’billi for his WBC title, in his first title defence. On 31 October 2026, in Riyadh, Saudi Arabia, Mbilli lost the fight via unanimous decision, with scorecards of 115–112, 116–111, and 117–110, all in favour of Álvarez.

== Personal life ==
Mbili has Cameroonian, French and Canadian citizenship.

== Professional boxing record ==
31 fights	29 wins	1 loss
By knockout	24	0
By decision	5	1
Draws	1	

No.	Result	Record	Opponent	Type	Round, time	Date	Location	Notes
31	Loss	29–1–1	Canelo Álvarez	UD	12	31 Oct 2026	Kingdom Arena, Riyadh, Saudi Arabia	Lost WBC super middleweight title
30	Draw	29–0–1	Lester Martínez	SD	10	13 Sep 2025	Allegiant Stadium, Paradise, Nevada, U.S.	Retained WBC interim super middleweight title
29	Win	29–0	Maciej Sulęcki	KO	1 (12), 2:28	27 Jun 2025	Videotron Centre, Quebec City, Canada	Won WBC interim super middleweight title
28	Win	28–0	Sergiy Derevyanchenko	UD	10	17 Aug 2024	Videotron Centre, Quebec City, Canada	Retained WBC Continental Americas title
27	Win	27–0	Mark Heffron	KO	1 (10), 0:40	25 May 2024	Centre Gervais Auto, Shawinigan, Canada	Retained WBC Continental Americas title
26	Win	26–0	Rohan Murdock	RTD	6 (10), 3:00	13 Jan 2024	Videotron Centre, Quebec City, Canada	Retained WBC Continental Americas and WBA International super middleweight titles
25	Win	25–0	Demond Nicholson	KO	4 (10), 1:56	8 Sep 2023	Casino du Lac-Leamy, Gatineau, Canada	Retained WBC Continental Americas and WBA International super middleweight titles
24	Win	24–0	Carlos Góngora	UD	10	23 Mar 2023	Montreal Casino, Montreal, Canada	Retained WBC Continental Americas and WBA International super middleweight titles
23	Win	23–0	Vaughn Alexander	UD	10	17 Dec 2022	Parc des Expositions, Nantes, France	
22	Win	22–0	DeAndre Ware	KO	2 (10), 2:20	9 Sep 2022	Montreal Casino, Montreal, Canada	Retained WBC Continental Americas super middleweight title; Won vacant WBA International super middleweight title
21	Win	21–0	Nadjib Mohammedi	KO	5 (10), 2:45	26 Mar 2022	Montreal Casino, Montreal, Canada	Retained WBC Continental Americas super middleweight title
20	Win	20–0	Ronald Ellis	UD	10	11 Dec 2021	Zembo Shrine Building, Harrisburg, Pennsylvania, U.S.	Retained WBC Continental Americas super middleweight title
19	Win	19–0	Ronny Landaeta	TKO	3 (10), 0:37	23 Sep 2021	Videotron Centre, Quebec City, Canada	Won vacant WBC Continental Americas super middleweight title
18	Win	18–0	Jesus Antonio Gutierrez Velazquez	TKO	5 (8), 1:53	22 Apr 2021	United States Military Academy, West Point, New York, U.S.	
17	Win	17–0	Rolando Paredes	TKO	3 (8), 1:04	12 Dec 2020	Hotel Holiday Inn, Cuernavaca, Mexico	
16	Win	16–0	KeAndrae Leatherwood	TKO	8 (10), 1:04	13 Dec 2019	Palais des sports Marcel-Cerdan, Paris, France	
15	Win	15–0	Abraham Juarez	TKO	9 (10), 2:35	12 Oct 2019	Palais des sports Marcel-Cerdan, Paris, France	Won vacant WBC Francophone middleweight title
14	Win	14–0	Humberto Gutierrez Ochoa	UD	8	30 Mar 2019	2300 Arena, Philadelphia, Pennsylvania, U.S.	
13	Win	13–0	Ilya Kharlamau	TKO	3 (8), 2:10	4 Dec 2018	Zénith Paris, Paris, France	
12	Win	12–0	Luis Fernando Pina	TKO	2 (10), 2:07	11 Oct 2018	Palais des Sports, Orléans, France	Retained WBC Youth middleweight title
11	Win	11–0	Ramon Aguinaga	KO	5 (8), 1:47	27 Jul 2018	Theatre du Tivoli, Le Cannet, France	Won vacant WBC Youth Intercontinental middleweight title
10	Win	10–0	Marcos Jesus Cornejo	TKO	3 (8), 1:52	19 May 2018	Air Canada Centre, Toronto, Canada	Won vacant WBC Youth middleweight title
9	Win	9–0	Luis Eduardo Paz	TKO	1 (6), 1:44	19 Apr 2018	Montreal Casino, Montreal, Canada	
8	Win	8–0	Jesus Gurrola	KO	2 (8), 1:45	15 Mar 2018	Montreal Casino, Montreal, Canada	
7	Win	7–0	Robert Swierzbinski	TKO	5 (8), 0:27	14 Dec 2017	Palais des sports Marcel-Cerdan, Paris, France	
6	Win	6–0	Martin Owono	KO	3 (6), 1:50	12 Oct 2017	Sud de France Arena, Pérols, France	
5	Win	5–0	Genaro Quiroga	KO	4 (6), 1:09	19 Aug 2017	Powerade Centre, Brampton, Canada	
4	Win	4–0	Cesar Lopez Ugarte	TKO	2 (4), 0:47	3 Jun 2017	Bell Centre, Montreal, Canada	
3	Win	3–0	Sergio de Leon	KO	3 (4), 1:13	8 Apr 2017	Tohu, Montreal, Canada	
2	Win	2–0	Jesus Olivares	TKO	3 (4), 0:34	24 Feb 2017	Videotron Centre, Quebec City, Canada	
1	Win	1–0	Adrian Arenas	KO	2 (4), 1:26	9 Feb 2017	Montreal Casino, Montreal, Canada	

== See also ==
- List of male boxers
- List of world super-middleweight boxing champions

Sporting positions
Regional boxing titles
Vacant Title last held by Mekhrubon Sanginov	WBC Youth middleweight champion 19 May 2018 – 2019; Vacated	Vacant Title next held by Ramadan Hiseni
Vacant Title last held by Yernar Yeshenov	WBC Youth Intercontinental middleweight champion 27 July 2018 – 2019; Vacated	Vacant Title next held by Erdonis Maliqi
Vacant Title last held by Steven Butler	WBC Francophone middleweight champion 12 October 2019 – 2020; Vacated	Vacant Title next held by Moughit El Moutaouakil
Vacant Title last held by Mike Gavronski	WBC Continental Americas super-middleweight champion 23 September 2021 – 27 June 2025; Won world title	Vacant Title next held by Wilkens Mathieu
Vacant Title last held by Bek Nurmaganbet	WBA International super-middleweight champion 9 September 2022 – 2024; Vacated	Vacant Title next held by Edin Avdic
World boxing titles
Vacant Title last held by David Benavidez	WBC super-middleweight champion Interim title 27 June 2025 – 27 January 2026; Promoted	Vacant
Vacant Title last held by Terence Crawford	WBC super-middleweight champion 27 January – 31 October 2026	Succeeded by Canelo Álvarez
