= Jack Cullen (boxer) =

British boxer (born 1993)

Personal information
- Nickname: Little Lever's Meat Cleaver
- Nationality: British
- Born: Jack Patrick Cullen; 7 November 1993 (age 32) Bolton, Lancashire, England
- Height: 6 ft 3 in (191 cm)
- Weight: Middleweight; Super-middleweight

Boxing career
- Reach: 78 in (198 cm)
- Stance: Orthodox

Boxing record
- Total fights: 29
- Wins: 22
- Win by KO: 10
- Losses: 6
- Draws: 1

Jack Patrick Cullen (born 7 November 1993) is a British professional boxer and current BKFC Middleweight Champion. He held the British and Commonwealth super-middleweight titles between 2023 and 2024. As an amateur, Cullen competed in the men's middleweight event at the 2014 English National Championships. He became BKFC Middleweight Champion as of 26th September 2026.

== Early life ==
Jack Patrick Cullen was born on 7 November 1993 and grew up in Little Lever, Bolton, England.

== Amateur career ==
Cullen competed at the 2014 English National Championships, where he lost to Jack Langford via a points-decision 2:1 in the quarter-finals at the Echo Arena, Liverpool.

== Professional career ==
Cullen won the British and Commonwealth super middleweight titles by stopping defending champion Mark Heffron in the third round of their contest at Manchester Arena on 2 September 2023.

He lost the titles in his first defense against Zak Chelli via unanimous decision at Liverpool Arena on 20 January 2024.

== Bare-knuckle boxing ==
Cullen made his Bare Knuckle Fighting Championship debut against Jakub Kosicki on 29 March 2025 at BKFC Fight Night 23. After delivering two knockdowns, he won the bout by technical knockout via doctor stoppage in the first round.

Cullen was scheduled to face Stanislav Grosu on 27 September 2025 at BKFC 81. However, for unknown reasons, the bout did not take place.

Cullen is scheduled to face Marley Churcher on 14 March 2026 at BKFC Fight Night 34. He won the fight by knockout in the second round.

== Professional boxing record ==
29 fights	22 wins	6 losses
By knockout	10	5
By decision	12	1
Draws	1	

No.	Result	Record	Opponent	Type	Round, time	Date	Location	Notes
29	Loss	22–6–1	Luka Plantic	TKO	5 (10), 2:35	6 Apr 2024	Frankenstolz Arena, Aschaffenburg, Germany	For WBC International super-middleweight title
28	Loss	22–5–1	Zak Chelli	UD	12	20 Jan 2024	Liverpool Arena, Liverpool, England	Lost British and Commonwealth super-middleweight titles
27	Win	22–4–1	Mark Heffron	TKO	3 (10) 2:43	2 Sep 2023	Manchester Arena, Manchester, England	Won British and Commonwealth super-middleweight titles
26	Loss	21–4–1	Diego Pacheco	TKO	4 (10) 0:40	11 Mar 2023	Liverpool Arena, Liverpool, England	For vacant WBO International super-middleweight title
25	Win	21–3–1	Vladimir Belujsky	PTS	8	16 Apr 2022	AO Arena, Manchester, England	
24	Loss	20–3–1	Kévin Lele Sadjo	TKO	6 (12), 1:11	18 Dec 2021	AO Arena, Manchester, England	For vacant European super-middleweight title
23	Win	20–2–1	Avni Yıldırım	UD	10	31 Jul 2021	Matchroom Fight Camp, Brentwood, England	Won vacant IBF International super-middleweight title
22	Win	19–2–1	John Docherty	UD	10	14 Nov 2020	Wembley Arena, London, England	
21	Draw	18–2–1	Zak Chelli	SD	10	22 Aug 2020	Matchroom Fight Camp, Brentwood, England	
20	Win	18–2	Tomas Andres Reynoso	TKO	2 (8), 2:31	7 Mar 2020	Manchester Arena, Manchester, England	
19	Loss	17–2	Felix Cash	TKO	8 (12), 1:14	2 Nov 2019	Manchester Arena, Manchester, England	For Commonwealth middleweight title
18	Win	17–1	John Harding Jr	TKO	8 (10), 2:07	2 Aug 2019	Exhibition Centre Liverpool, Liverpool, England	Retained English middleweight title
17	Win	16–1	Jack Sellars	TKO	8 (10), 1:33	11 May 2019	Bolton Whites Hotel, Bolton, England	Won vacant English middleweight title
16	Win	15–1	Tomas Bezvoda	TKO	3 (10), 2:57	8 Dec 2018	Bolton Whites Hotel, Bolton, England	
15	Win	14–1	Alistair Warren	TKO	3 (6), 2:11	6 Oct 2018	Oldham Leisure Centre, Oldham, England	
14	Win	13–1	Emmanuel Moussinga	TKO	2 (8), 2:37	16 Jun 2018	Bolton Whites Hotel, Bolton, England	
13	Win	12–1	Harry Matthews	PTS	6	5 May 2018	Victoria Warehouse, Manchester, England	
12	Win	11–1	Nick Quigley	UD	3	3 Mar 2018	National Stadium, Dublin, Ireland	
11	Win	10–1	Chris Blaney	UD	3	3 Mar 2018	National Stadium, Dublin, Ireland	
10	Loss	9–1	Roy Sheahan	TKO	1 (3), 2:52	3 Mar 2018	National Stadium, Dublin, Ireland	
9	Win	9–0	Alistair Warren	TKO	4 (8), 2:48	24 Feb 2018	Bolton Whites Hotel, Bolton, England	
8	Win	8–0	Deividas Šajauka	TKO	4 (6), 0:55	10 Nov 2017	Victoria Warehouse, Manchester, England	
7	Win	7–0	Callum Ide	TKO	2 (4), 2:18	23 Sep 2017	Manchester Arena, Manchester, England	
6	Win	6–0	Jason Ball	PTS	6	15 Jul 2017	Winter Gardens, Blackpool, England	
5	Win	5–0	Dan Blackwell	PTS	6	19 May 2017	Bolton Whites Hotel, Bolton, England	
4	Win	4–0	Dwain Grant	PTS	4	11 Mar 2017	Preston Guild Hall, Preston, England	
3	Win	3–0	Scott Hillman	PTS	4	18 Dec 2016	Lancashire County Cricket Club, Manchester, England	
2	Win	2–0	Robert Studzinski	PTS	4	3 Dec 2016	Leigh Sports Village, Leigh, England	
1	Win	1–0	Curtis Gargano	PTS	4	22 Oct 2016	Bolton Whites Hotel, Bolton, England	

== Bare-knuckle boxing record ==
Professional record breakdown
2 matches	2 wins	0 losses
By knockout	2	0

Res.	Record	Opponent	Method	Event	Date	Round	Time	Location	Notes
Win	2–0	Marley Churcher	KO	BKFC Fight Night Newcastle: Terrill vs. McFarlane	March 14, 2026	2	1:59	Newcastle upon Tyne, England	
Win	1–0	Jakub Kosicki	TKO (doctor stoppage)	BKFC Fight Night Manchester: Chipchase vs. Fox	March 29, 2025	1	1:24	Altrincham, England	

Sporting positions
Regional boxing titles
Vacant Title last held by Reece Cartwright	English middleweight champion 11 May 2019 – 20 November 2019; Vacated	Vacant Title next held by Linus Udofia
Preceded by Daniele Scardina	IBF International super-middleweight title champion 31 July 2021 – present	Incumbent
