= Anthony Sims Jr. =

American boxer

Personal information
- Nickname: Magician
- Nationality: American
- Born: February 23, 1995 (age 31) Plainfield, Indiana, U.S.
- Height: 6 ft 1 in (185 cm)
- Weight: Super middleweight; Light heavyweight

Boxing career
- Reach: 79 in (201 cm)
- Stance: Orthodox

Boxing record
- Total fights: 25
- Wins: 23
- Win by KO: 20
- Losses: 2

Anthony Sims Jr. (born February 23, 1995) is an American professional boxer.

== Personal life ==
Sims was born on February 23, 1995, in Plainfield, Indiana. He is a cousin of Floyd Mayweather Jr.

== Professional career ==
Sims Jr. was a decorated US amateur and finished his amateur career with a record of 188–13, including 10 national titles.

The 6 ft 1 light heavyweight has demonstrated exceptional power and has knocked out all but two of his opponents. He has 10 first-round KO's.

On August 1, 2018, he signed with promoter Eddie Hearn under Matchroom Boxing USA. Sims Jr. is now a free agent.

== Professional boxing record ==
25 fights	23 wins	2 losses
By knockout	20	0
By decision	3	2

No.	Result	Record	Opponent	Type	Round, time	Date	Location	Notes
25	Loss	23–2	(United Kingdom) Zak Chelli	UD	10	Feb 11, 2023	(United Kingdom) Wembley Arena, Wembley, England	For WBA Continental super middleweight title
24	Win	23–1	(United States) Antonio Todd	UD	8	Dec 21, 2022	(United States) Sony Hall, Manhattan, New York, U.S.	
23	Win	22–1	(United States) Manny Woods	TKO	3 (8), 1:22	Dec 18, 2021	(United States) The Armory, Minneapolis, Minnesota, U.S.	
22	Win	21–1	(Argentina) Hernán David Peréz	TKO	9 (12), 2:29	Aug 13, 2021	(United Arab Emirates) Atlantis Palm Hotel, Dubai, UAE	For WBA Intercontinental super middleweight title
21	Loss	20–1	(Colombia) Roamer Alexis Angulo	SD	10	Jan 30, 2020	(United States) Meridian at Island Gardens, Miami, Florida, U.S.	For WBO Latino super middleweight title
20	Win	20–0	(United States) Morgan Fitch	TKO	6 (10), 0:42	Oct 12, 2019	(United States) Wintrust Arena, Chicago, Illinois, U.S.	
19	Win	19–0	(United States) Vaughn Alexander	UD	10	Apr 26, 2019	(United States) The Forum, Inglewood, California, U.S.	
18	Win	18–0	(Argentina) Mateo Damian Veron	TKO	6 (10), 1:54	Mar 2, 2019	(United Kingdom) East of England Arena, Peterborough, England	
17	Win	17–0	(United States) Colby Courter	TKO	2 (8), 0:40	Nov 17, 2018	(United States) Kansas Star Arena, Mulvane, Kansas, U.S.	
16	Win	16–0	(Mexico) Mario Aguilar	KO	6 (8), 2:49	Oct 6, 2018	(United States) Wintrust Arena, Chicago, Illinois, U.S.	
15	Win	15–0	(Czech Republic) Stanislav Eschner	TKO	4 (6), 1:13	Aug 4, 2018	(United Kingdom) Ice Arena Wales, Cardiff, Wales	
14	Win	14–0	(Mexico) Miguel Cubos	TKO	1 (6), 2:58	Feb 24, 2017	(United States) Motor City Casino, Detroit, Michigan, U.S.	
13	Win	13–0	(United States) Rayco Saunders	TKO	2 (6), 2:01	Nov 17, 2016	(United States) Motor City Casino, Detroit, Michigan, U.S.	
12	Win	12–0	(United Kingdom) Jimmy Campbell	TKO	1 (8), 1:17	Jun 18, 2016	(United States) Tim Faulkner Gallery, Louisville, Kentucky, U.S.	
11	Win	11–0	(United States) Keith Debow	TKO	1 (6), 1:27	May 7, 2016	(United States) Alliant Energy Center, Madison, Wisconsin, U.S.	
10	Win	10–0	(United States) William Johnson	TKO	1 (6), 2:26	Mar 26, 2016	(United States) Farm Bureau Building, Indianapolis, Indiana, U.S.	
9	Win	9–0	(United States) Eric Moon	TKO	1 (4), 2:15	Feb 13, 2016	(United States) Royal Oak Music Theatre, Detroit, Michigan, U.S.	
8	Win	8–0	(United States) Joe Jiles	KO	1 (6), 1:10	Jan 22, 2016	(United States) Wheeling Island Casino Racetrack, Wheeling, West Virginia, U.S.	
7	Win	7–0	(United States) Darius Shorter	TKO	1 (8), 1:38	Nov 28, 2015	(United States) Wheeling Island Hotel Casino Racetrack, Wheeling, West Virginia, U.S.	
6	Win	6–0	(United States) Ramiro Bueno Jr.	TKO	1 (6), 1:25	Oct 17, 2015	(United States) Derby Park Expo, Louisville, Kentucky, U.S.	
5	Win	5–0	(United States) Anthony Morgan	KO	1 (4), 0:55	Jun 27, 2015	(United States) Tyndall Armoury, Indianapolis, Indiana, U.S.	
4	Win	4–0	(United States) Dwayne Williams	TKO	2 (4), 1:47	Apr 17, 2015	(United States) International Banquet Center, Detroit, Michigan, U.S.	
3	Win	3–0	(United States) Cody Groves	KO	1 (4), 2:17	Feb 28, 2015	(United States) McGowan Hall - Knights of Columbus, Indianapolis, Indiana, U.S.	
2	Win	2–0	(United States) Josh Thorpe	TKO	2 (4), 2:25	May 29, 2014	(United States) Horseshoe Casino, Cincinnati, Ohio, U.S.	
1	Win	1–0	(United States) James Lee Guy	UD	4	Apr 19, 2014	(United States) McGowan Hall - Knights of Columbus, Indianapolis, Indiana, U.S.	
