= Lerrone Richards =

British boxer (born 1992)

Personal information
- Nickname: Sniper The Boss
- Born: Lerrone Richards; 25 August 1992 (age 34) New Malden, Greater London, England
- Height: 5 ft 11 in (180 cm)
- Weight: Super-middleweight; Light-heavyweight

Boxing career
- Reach: 71 in (180 cm)
- Stance: Southpaw

Boxing record
- Total fights: 21
- Wins: 19
- Win by KO: 4
- Losses: 2
Medal record
Men's amateur boxing
English National Championships
Bronze medal – third place	2013 Houghton-le-Spring	Middleweight

Lerrone Richards (born 25 August 1992) is a British professional boxer who formerly held the IBO super-middleweight title, having won it in December 2021. At regional level he held the British, Commonwealth and European super-middleweight titles between 2019 and 2021.

== Amateur career ==
As an amateur Richards compiled a record of 91–9. He represented Ghana at the 2012 African Olympic Qualifier, losing in the quarter-final to Abdelmalek Rahou by 9:16.

== Professional career ==
Richards made his professional debut on 29 September 2013, scoring a four-round points decision (PTS) victory over Robert Studzinski at the York Hall in London.

With four wins out of four fights under his belt, Richards had a two-year absence from competitive bouts while waiting for his contract to expire with his current management team due to a dispute; his last fight being a PTS win over Darren McKenna in April 2014. In 2016, with his contract now expired, Richards signed a promotional deal with Frank Warren's Queensberry Promotions. His return to the ring came on 24 October of that year, winning with a first-round technical knockout (TKO) against Gordan Glisic.

He fought and won five times in 2017, ending the year with a fight against Rhys Pagan for the vacant WBO European super-middleweight title on 27 November at the Grange St. Paul's Hotel in London. Richards won the fight via ten-round unanimous decision (UD), with two judges scoring the bout 99–91 and the third scoring it 98–92.

Following a six-round PTS victory over Chris Dutton in March 2018 – Richards' only fight of 2018 due to injury – he fought Tommy Langford on 27 April 2019 at the Wembley Arena, London, with the vacant WBO International, and Commonwealth super-middleweight titles on the line. Richards won by UD with the three judges scoring the bout 118–111, 118–110 and 116–113.

The first defence of his Commonwealth title came against Lennox Clarke on 30 November 2019 at Arena Birmingham, with the vacant British title also up for grabs. Richards retained his title via split decision (SD), adding the British title to his collection. Two judges scored in favour of Richards with 117–112 and 116–113 while the third scored it 115–113 to Clarke.

Richards defeated Giovanni De Carolis by unanimous decision to win the vacant European super-middleweight title at AO Arena in Manchester on 15 May 2021.

At the same venue, he faced IBO super-middleweight champion Carlos Góngora on 18 December 2021, winning via split decision.

Richards was scheduled to challenge WBA interim light-heavyweight champion Albert Ramírez at Montreal Casino in Montreal, Canada, on 5 February 2026. However, the fight was cancelled when Ramírez was hospitalised due to appendicitis two days before the event. The bout was rescheduled to take place at the same venue on 4 June 2026. Richards lost by split decision with the judges' scorecards reading 116–112, 113–115 and 113–115.

== Professional boxing record ==
21 fights	19 wins	2 losses
By knockout	4	1
By decision	15	1

No.	Result	Record	Opponent	Type	Round, time	Date	Location	Notes
21	Loss	19–2	Albert Ramírez	SD	12	4 Jun 2026	Montreal Casino, Montreal, Canada	For WBA interim light-heavyweight title
20	Win	19–1	Dylan Courtney	PTS	6	26 Sep 2025	York Hall, London, England	
19	Loss	18–1	Steed Woodall	TKO	6 (10), 1:39	14 Jun 2024	Bolton Whites Hotel, Bolton, England	For vacant WBO Inter-Continental super-middleweight title
18	Win	18–0	Mickey Ellison	PTS	8	10 Nov 2023	Brighton Centre, Brighton, England	
17	Win	17–0	Harry Matthews	KO	4 (6), 1:32	12 May 2023	Maher Centre, Leicester, England	
16	Win	16–0	Carlos Góngora	SD	12	18 Dec 2021	AO Arena, Manchester, England	Won IBO super-middleweight title
15	Win	15–0	Giovanni De Carolis	UD	12	15 May 2021	AO Arena, Manchester, England	Won vacant European super-middleweight title
14	Win	14–0	Timo Laine	PTS	8	5 Dec 2020	The SSE Arena, London, England	
13	Win	13–0	Lennox Clarke	SD	12	30 Nov 2019	Arena Birmingham, Birmingham, England	Retained Commonwealth super-middleweight title; Won vacant British super-middleweight title
12	Win	12–0	Tommy Langford	UD	12	27 Apr 2019	The SSE Arena, London, England	Won vacant Commonwealth and WBO International super-middleweight titles
11	Win	11–0	Chris Dutton	PTS	6	31 Mar 2018	BT Convention Centre, Liverpool, England	
10	Win	10–0	Rhys Pagan	UD	10	27 Nov 2017	Grange St. Paul's Hotel, London, England	Won vacant WBO European super-middleweight title
9	Win	9–0	Ferenc Albert	PTS	6	16 Sep 2017	Copper Box Arena, London, England	
8	Win	8–0	Lewis van Poetsch	TKO	3 (4), 2:06	22 Jul 2017	Brentwood Centre, Brentwood, England	
7	Win	7–0	Anthony Fox	PTS	6	20 May 2017	Copper Box Arena, London, England	
6	Win	6–0	Attila Tibor Nagy	PTS	6	24 Feb 2017	York Hall, London, England	
5	Win	5–0	Gordan Glisic	TKO	1 (4), 2:47	24 Oct 2016	Hilton Hotel, London, England	
4	Win	4–0	Darren McKenna	PTS	4	27 Apr 2014	York Hall, London, England	
3	Win	3–0	Mark Till	PTS	4	22 Feb 2014	Ice Arena, Hull, England	
2	Win	2–0	Jay Morris	RTD	1 (4), 3:00	24 Nov 2013	York Hall, London, England	
1	Win	1–0	Robert Studzinski	PTS	4	29 Sep 2013	York Hall, London, England	

Sporting positions
Regional boxing titles
Vacant Title last held by Andrey Sirotkin	WBO European super-middleweight champion 27 November 2017 – October 2018; Vacated	Vacant Title next held by Patrick Rokohl
Vacant Title last held by Arthur Abraham	WBO International super-middleweight champion 27 April 2019 – February 2020	Vacant Title next held by Zach Parker
Vacant Title last held by Rocky Fielding	Commonwealth super-middleweight champion 27 April 2019 – November 2020; Vacated	Vacant
Vacant Title last held by Zach Parker	British super-middleweight champion 30 November 2019 – November 2020; Vacated	Vacant
Vacant Title last held by Stefan Härtel	European super-middleweight champion 15 May 2021 – September 2021	Vacant
Minor world boxing titles
Preceded by Carlos Góngora	IBO super-middleweight champion 18 December 2021 – ?	Vacant Title next held by Osleys Iglesias
