= Jordan White (boxer) =

American professional boxer

Personal information
- Nickname: Shortdog
- Born: August 27, 1997 (age 29) Landover, Maryland, U.S.
- Height: 5 ft 7½ in
- Weight: Super-featherweight; Lightweight

Boxing career
- Reach: 70 in (178 cm)
- Stance: Orthodox

Boxing record
- Total fights: 23
- Wins: 21
- Losses: 2

Jordan White (born August 27, 1997) is an American professional boxer. He has held regional championships at super-featherweight and lightweight, including the WBC International lightweight title.

== Amateur career ==
White began boxing at the age of eight after being introduced to the sport by his cousin, 2000 United States Olympian Clarence Vinson. He compiled an amateur record of 145–16 and won nine national championships. White also represented the United States in international competition alongside future world champions Devin Haney and Shakur Stevenson.

== Professional career ==
White made his professional debut on December 8, 2015, defeating Jose Roman by first-round knockout. He won his first four bouts before suffering a unanimous-decision loss to undefeated prospect Adam Lopez in May 2017. White reportedly fought through a broken hand during the bout.

=== White vs. Garcia ===
After winning ten consecutive fights following his first defeat, White faced undefeated prospect Eridson Garcia in a ShoBox main event on August 4, 2023. White knocked Garcia out with a left hook in the opening round, capturing the NABF super-featherweight title.

=== Move to lightweight ===
White moved up to lightweight in 2025. On September 5, he faced René Téllez Girón for the vacant NABF lightweight title in Washington, D.C. White was knocked down in the fifth round and lost by unanimous decision, with scores of 97–92, 95–93 and 95–94.

White returned on January 30, 2026, defeating Willie Shaw by unanimous decision to win the vacant WBC International lightweight title. He retained the title against Luis Torres on August 29, stopping him in the later rounds at the Galen Center in Los Angeles.

== Professional boxing record ==
23 fights	21 wins	2 losses
By knockout	13	0
By decision	8	2

No.	Result	Record	Opponent	Type	Round, time	Date	Location	Notes
23	Win	21–2	Luis Torres	TKO	9 (10)	29 Aug 2026	Galen Center, Los Angeles, California, U.S.	Retained WBC International lightweight title
22	Win	20–2	Willie Shaw	UD	10	30 Jan 2026	Maryland Live Casino, Hanover, Maryland, U.S.	Won vacant WBC International lightweight title
21	Loss	19–2	René Téllez Girón	UD	10	5 Sep 2025	Entertainment and Sports Arena, Washington, D.C., U.S.	For vacant NABF lightweight title
20	Win	19–1	Matías Romero	UD	10	12 Apr 2025	Maryland Live Casino, Hanover, Maryland, U.S.	Retained NABF super-featherweight title
19	Win	18–1	Jason Sanchez	UD	10	3 Aug 2024	Entertainment and Sports Arena, Washington, D.C., U.S.	
18	Win	17–1	Jonathan Oquendo	TKO	1 (10)	18 May 2024	Entertainment and Sports Arena, Washington, D.C., U.S.	Retained NABF super-featherweight title
17	Win	16–1	Jose Edgardo Garcia	UD	10	4 Nov 2023	Entertainment and Sports Arena, Washington, D.C., U.S.	
16	Win	15–1	Eridson Garcia	KO	1 (10)	4 Aug 2023	Wind Creek Events Center, Bethlehem, Pennsylvania, U.S.	Won NABF super-featherweight title
15	Win	14–1	Derrick Murray	UD	10	6 Aug 2022	Maryland Live Casino, Hanover, Maryland, U.S.	Retained WBC USNBC super-featherweight title
14	Win	13–1	Brandon Valdes	SD	10	19 Feb 2022	Maryland Live Casino, Hanover, Maryland, U.S.	Won vacant WBC USNBC super-featherweight title
13	Win	12–1	Joe Perez	RTD	6 (8)	23 Oct 2021	Maryland Live Casino, Hanover, Maryland, U.S.	
12	Win	11–1	Misael Lopez	TKO	6 (8)	10 Mar 2021	Mohegan Sun Arena, Uncasville, Connecticut, U.S.	
11	Win	10–1	Ronaldo Solis	TKO	7 (8)	28 Feb 2020	Maryland Live Casino, Hanover, Maryland, U.S.	Won vacant WBC Youth Intercontinental super-featherweight title
10	Win	9–1	Vincent Jennings	TKO	4 (6)	2 Aug 2019	Maryland Live Casino, Hanover, Maryland, U.S.	
9	Win	8–1	Christian Esquivel	UD	6	18 May 2019	Entertainment and Sports Arena, Washington, D.C., U.S.	
8	Win	7–1	Ndira Spearman	TKO	1 (6)	1 Dec 2018	Entertainment and Sports Arena, Washington, D.C., U.S.	
7	Win	6–1	Christian Renteria	KO	1 (6)	8 Nov 2018	Fantasy Springs Resort Casino, Indio, California, U.S.	
6	Win	5–1	Francisco Rodriguez	TKO	4 (6)	22 Sep 2018	Bowie State University, Bowie, Maryland, U.S.	
5	Loss	4–1	Adam Lopez	UD	6	20 May 2017	Laredo Energy Arena, Laredo, Texas, U.S.	
4	Win	4–0	Jose Elizondo	UD	6	5 Nov 2016	Rosecroft Raceway, Fort Washington, Maryland, U.S.	
3	Win	3–0	Sergio Aguilar	RTD	2 (4)	19 Aug 2016	Crystal City Hilton, Crystal City, Virginia, U.S.	
2	Win	2–0	Manuel Rubalcava	TKO	1 (4)	9 Feb 2016	Sands Bethlehem Event Center, Bethlehem, Pennsylvania, U.S.	
1	Win	1–0	Jose Roman	KO	1 (4)	8 Dec 2015	Sun National Bank Center, Trenton, New Jersey, U.S.	
