= Diego Pacheco (boxer) =

American boxer (born 2001)

Personal information
- Nationality: American; Mexican
- Born: March 8, 2001 (age 25) Los Angeles, California, U.S.
- Height: 6 ft 4 in (193 cm)
- Weight: Middleweight, Super middleweight

Boxing career
- Reach: 79 in (201 cm)
- Stance: Orthodox

Boxing record
- Total fights: 27
- Wins: 26
- Win by KO: 19
- Losses: 1

Diego Pacheco (born March 8, 2001) is an American of Mexican origin professional boxer. He is a former WBC Silver and WBO International super-middleweight champion.

== Early life ==
Pacheco was born on March 8, 2001, in Los Angeles to Mexican parents. His mother is from Zacatecas and his father from Mexico City.

== Amateur career ==
Pacheco began boxing at the age of ten and amassed over seventy-five bouts and eight national championships in his amateur career. At the time he turned professional, he was ranked as the top amateur middleweight in both the United States and Mexico.

== Professional career ==
In October 2018 Pacheco signed with Eddie Hearn's Matchroom Boxing USA. He made his professional debut on December 22, 2018, at the Auditorio Fausto Gutiérrez Moreno in Tijuana, Mexico, against Luis Carlos Gonzalez, winning by knockout (KO) early in the first round. In 2019, he fought and won seven times, including six victories by way of KO. On December 7, 2019, he featured on the undercard of Andy Ruiz Jr. vs Anthony Joshua II in Riyadh, Saudi Arabia, knocking out the more experienced opponent Selemani Saidi with a right hand.

On February 29, 2020, Pacheco defeated Oscar Riojas via six-round unanimous decision (UD) on the undercard of Mikey Garcia vs. Jessie Vargas at the Ford Center at The Star in Frisco, Texas.

On March 5, 2022, Pacheco stopped Genc Pllana in the second round. On June 10, 2022, he defeated Raul Ortega via fourth-round retirement.

On April 6, 2024, in Las Vegas, Pacheco was scheduled to face Shawn McCalman. He won the fight by unanimous decision and retained his WBC USA and WBO International super middleweight titles.

Pacheco was scheduled to face former title challenger Maciej Sulecki at Dignity Health Sports Park, Carson, California, on August 31, 2024. Pacheco won the fight by knockout in the sixth round with liver shot.

Pacheco beat Steven Nelson by unanimous decision in Las Vegas on January 25, 2025.

He recovered from being knocked to the canvas in the eighth round to defeat the previously unbeaten Kévin Sadjo via unanimous decision to claim the WBC Silver super-middleweight title at Stockton Arena in Stockton, California, on December 13, 2025.

Pacheco successfully defended the title with an 11th-round technical knockout win over Immanuwel Aleem at Dignity Health Sports Park in Carson, California, on July 18, 2026.

At the same venue on November 14, 2026, he lost his titles and, unbeaten professional record, going down to a unanimous decision defeat against Darius Fulghum despite his opponent being docked a point in the ninth round for repeatedly hitting him behind the head.

== Fighting style ==
At 6'4" in height, Pacheco is well known for his length and superior sense of timing, as well as for having power in both hands.

== Professional boxing record ==
27 fights	26 wins	1 loss
By knockout	19	0
By decision	7	1

No.	Result	Record	Opponent	Type	Round, time	Date	Location	Notes
27	Loss	26–1	Darius Fulghum	UD	12	Nov 14, 2026	Dignity Health Sports Park, Carson, California, U.S.	Lost WBO International and WBC Silver super middleweight titles
26	Win	26–0	Immanuwel Aleem	TKO	11 (12), 2:32	Jul 18, 2026	Dignity Health Sports Park, Carson, California, U.S.	Retained WBO International and WBC Silver super middleweight titles
25	Win	25–0	Kévin Lele Sadjo	UD	12	Dec 13, 2025	Stockton Arena, Stockton, California, U.S	Retained WBO International super middleweight title; Won WBC Silver super middleweight title
24	Win	24–0	Trevor McCumby	UD	12	Jul 19, 2025	Ford Center at The Star, Frisco, Texas, U.S	Retained WBC-USNBC and WBO International super middleweight titles
23	Win	23–0	Steven Nelson	UD	12	Jan 25, 2025	Chelsea Ballroom, Paradise, Nevada, U.S	Retained WBC-USNBC and WBO International super middleweight titles
22	Win	22–0	Maciej Sulęcki	KO	6 (12), 0:54	Aug 31, 2024	Dignity Health Sports Park, Carson, California, U.S.	Retained WBC-USNBC and WBO International super middleweight titles
21	Win	21–0	Shawn McCalman	UD	10	Apr 6, 2024	Fontainebleau Las Vegas, Winchester, Nevada, U.S.	Retained WBC-USNBC and WBO International super middleweight titles
20	Win	20–0	Marcelo Cóceres	KO	9 (12), 2:53	Nov 18, 2023	YouTube Theater, Inglewood, California, U.S.	Retained WBC-USNBC and WBO International super middleweight titles
19	Win	19–0	Manuel Gallegos	TKO	4 (10), 0:11	Jul 7, 2023	Cintermex, Monterrey, Mexico	Retained WBC-USNBC and WBO International super middleweight titles
18	Win	18–0	Jack Cullen	TKO	4 (10) 0:40	11 Mar 2023	Liverpool Arena, Liverpool, England	Won vacant WBO International super middleweight title
17	Win	17–0	Ricardo Adrian Luna	TKO	2 (10), 2:08	Dec 3, 2022	Desert Diamond Arena, Glendale, Arizona, U.S.	Retained WBC-USNBC super middleweight title
16	Win	16–0	Enrique Collazo	TKO	5 (10), 2:29	Sep 17, 2022	T-Mobile Arena, Paradise, Nevada, U.S.	Won vacant WBC-USNBC super middleweight title
15	Win	15–0	Raul Ortega	RTD	4 (8), 3:00	Jun 10, 2022	Domo Alcalde, Guadalajara, Mexico	
14	Win	14–0	Genc Pllana	KO	2 (8), 1:29	Mar 5, 2022	Pechanga Arena, San Diego, California, U.S.	
13	Win	13–0	Lucas De Abreu	TKO	8 (8), 2:21	Oct 16, 2021	Chukchansi Park, Fresno, California, U.S.	
12	Win	12–0	Jesús Moroyoqui	TKO	6 (8), 2:17	Jun 26, 2021	Arena Alcalde, Guadalajara, Mexico	
11	Win	11–0	Rodolfo Gomez Jr.	UD	8	Feb 27, 2021	Hard Rock Stadium, Miami Gardens, Florida, U.S.	
10	Win	10–0	Juan Antonio Méndez	TKO	2 (6), 0:19	Oct 23, 2020	Gimnasio TV Azteca, Mexico City, Mexico	
9	Win	9–0	Oscar Riojas	UD	6	Feb 29, 2020	Ford Center at The Star, Frisco, Texas, U.S.	
8	Win	8–0	Selemani Saidi	KO	1 (4), 1:38	Dec 7, 2019	Diriyah Arena, Riyadh, Saudi Arabia	
7	Win	7–0	Aaron Casper	KO	4 (6), 2:49	Nov 9, 2019	Staples Center, Los Angeles, California, U.S.	
6	Win	6–0	Terry Fernandez	KO	3 (4), 0:41	Sep 14, 2019	Dignity Health Sports Park, Carson, California, U.S.	
5	Win	5–0	Jose Alonso Esparza	TKO	1 (4), 1:17	Aug 24, 2019	Centros de Usos Multiples, Hermosillo, Mexico	
4	Win	4–0	Jared Chauvin	TKO	1 (4), 1:50	Jun 1, 2019	Madison Square Garden, New York City, New York, U.S.	
3	Win	3–0	Guillermo Maldonado	KO	1 (4), 1:46	Apr 26, 2019	The Forum, Inglewood, California, U.S.	
2	Win	2–0	Felix Alberto Aguilar	UD	4	Feb 23, 2019	Auditorio Fausto Gutierrez Moreno, Tijuana, Mexico	
1	Win	1–0	Luis Carlos Gonzalez	KO	1 (4), 2:33	Dec 22, 2018	Auditorio Fausto Gutierrez Moreno, Tijuana, Mexico	
