= Maximo Chanda Mwale =

Zambian comedian

Chanda Mwale (22 May 1961 – 27 July 2001) popularly known as a 'Maximo' was a Zambian comedian and TV broadcaster.

He appeared in a number of short films known as Play Cicle on the Zambia National Broadcasting Corporation (ZNBC). He and fellow comedian and friend Daniel Kanengoki popularly known as 'Sauzande' become a duo in a number of shows they did together.

He died 27 July 2001 after an illness and was buried 31 July 2001 in Old Leopards Hill cemetery, Lusaka. At the time of his death he was survived by a wife and 3 children.

He received a posthumous award from the National Association for Media Arts in 2011.
