= David Mwale =

Zambian boxer (born 1999)

David "Sniper" Mwale
Personal information
- Nickname: Sniper
- Nationality: Zambian
- Born: David Mwale; February 12, 1999 (age 27) Lusaka, Zambia
- Years active: 2018–present
- Height: 5 ft 7 in (170 cm)

Boxing career
- Weight class: Bantamweight
- Reach: 75 in (191 cm)
- Stance: southpaw

Boxing record
- Total fights: 13
- Wins: 13
- Win by KO: 7
- Losses: 0
- Draws: 0

David Mwale (born 12 February 1999), nicknamed "Sniper", is a Zambian professional boxer. He has held the World Boxing Council (WBC) International bantamweight title since June 2025 and previously held the African Boxing Union (ABU) bantamweight title.

Mwale made his professional debut in October 2018 and remained unbeaten through his first 13 bouts. He won the vacant ABU bantamweight title in December 2023 before claiming the vacant WBC International bantamweight title with a unanimous decision over Michael Decardi Nelson on 28 June 2025. In January 2026, he retained the WBC International title with a first-round knockout of Ramadhan Pido.

== Early life ==
Born on 12 February 1999, David Mwale found inspiration in boxing through his older brother, Adam Mwale, whose talent and dedication left a lasting impression on him. Adam’s untimely death at the age of 23 deeply affected David and became a defining motivation in his decision to pursue boxing seriously from the age of 12.

In 2012, David’s potential attracted the attention of Oriental Quarries Boxing Promotions, who began supporting both his athletic development and education. Their sponsorship helped ease financial pressures on his family and allowed him to focus on training while continuing his schooling. With their support, he later completed his secondary education at Mukamambo School, graduating in 2019 with a full Grade 12 certificate.

Prior to this support, David’s family experienced financial challenges and limited access to educational opportunities. Assistance from Oriental Quarries Boxing Promotions contributed to his academic advancement and boxing development, helping him focus on establishing his professional career.

== Professional career ==
David Mwale began his professional boxing career with a unanimous decision (UD) victory over Wiseman Chuma across four scheduled rounds on 13 October 2018 at the Government Complex in Lusaka, Zambia. He followed this with another UD victory over Philimon Hara on 19 October 2019. Mwale returned to the ring on 26 February 2022, defeating Bongani Makovora by UD over eight rounds at the Government Complex in Lusaka.

On 25 June 2022, Mwale recorded his fourth victory by knocking out Aubrey Masamba in the first round of a scheduled eight-round bout at the Chipata Golf Club in Chipata. He extended his unbeaten record on 15 July 2023, stopping Patrick Kimweri by technical knockout (TKO) in the first round of a scheduled eight-round bout at the Mulungushi International Conference Centre in Lusaka. On 16 December 2023, Mwale won his first professional title, defeating Innocent Mantengu by UD over twelve rounds at the Government Complex in Lusaka, claiming the vacant ABU Bantamweight title.

Mwale retained the ABU Bantamweight title on 6 April 2024, defeating James Mugeni by technical decision (TD-M) over ten rounds of a scheduled twelve-round bout, and again on 17 August 2024, defeating Kouassi Martin Klaklevi by RTD (corner retirement) in the seventh round of a scheduled twelve-round bout at the Government Complex in Lusaka.

He won the vacant WBC International Bantamweight title on 28 June 2025, defeating Michael Decardi Nelson by UD over twelve rounds at the Government Complex in Lusaka. On 31 January 2026, Mwale retained the WBC International Bantamweight title, defeating Ramadhan Pido by first-round knockout (KO) of a scheduled twelve-round bout at the Government Complex in Lusaka.

== Professional boxing record ==
13 fights	13 wins	0 losses
By knockout	7	0
By decision	6	0
Draws	0	

No.	Result	Record	Opponent	Type	Round, time	Date	Location	Notes
13	Win	12–0–0	Tionge Chingeni	KO	2 (8)	February 27, 2026	Chipata, Eastern, Zambia	—N/a
12	Win	11–0–0	Ramadhan Pido	KO	1 (12), 2:41	January 31, 2026	Government Complex, Lusaka, Zambia	Retained WBC International Bantamweight title
11	Win	10–0–0	Michael Decardi Nelson	UD	12	June 28, 2025	Government Complex, Lusaka, Zambia	Won vacant WBC International Bantamweight title
10	Win	9–0–0	Pemphero Nkhoma	KO	1 (8)	December 25, 2024	Railway Ground, Monze, Southern, Zambia	—N/a
9	Win	8–0–0	Patrick Kimweri	TKO	2 (6)	November 2, 2024	Game Ranch, Chingola, Copperbelt, Zambia	—N/a
8	Win	7–0–0	Kouassi Martin Klaklevi	RTD	7 (12)	August 17, 2024	Government Complex, Lusaka, Zambia	Retained ABU Bantamweight title
7	Win	6–0–0	James Mugeni	TD-M	10 (12)	April 6, 2024	Government Complex, Lusaka, Zambia	Retained ABU Bantamweight title
6	Win	5–0–0	Innocent Mantengu	UD	12	December 16, 2023	Government Complex, Lusaka, Zambia	Won vacant ABU Bantamweight title
5	Win	4–0–0	Patrick Kimweri	TKO	1(8)	July 15, 2023	Mulungushi Conference Center, Lusaka, Zambia	—N/a
4	Win	3–0–0	Aubrey Masamba	KO	1(8)	June 25, 2022	Chipata Golf Club, Chipata, Zambia	—N/a
3	Win	2–0–0	Bongani Makovora	UD	8	February 26, 2022	Government Complex, Lusaka, Zambia	—N/a
2	Win	1–0–0	Philimon Hara	UD	6	October 19, 2019	Government Complex, Lusaka, Zambia	—N/a
1	Win	—N/a	Wiseman Chuma	UD	4	October 13, 2018	Government Complex, Lusaka, Zambia	Professional debut
