= Super middleweight =

Weight class used in combat sports

Super middleweight is a weight class in combat sports.

== Boxing ==
In professional boxing, super middleweight is contested between the middleweight and light heavyweight divisions, in which boxers can weigh between 160 pounds (73 kg) and 168 pounds (76 kg). The class first appeared in 1967.

=== History ===
==== 1960s–1983 ====
There was interest in a division between middleweight and light heavyweight in the late 1960s, the mid-1970s, and the early 1980s. A few states briefly recognized a "Junior Light Heavyweight" division at 167 pounds (76 kg) and the fringe World Athletic Association (WAA) later inaugurated a "super middleweight" division at 168 pounds (76 kg). On April 3, 1967, in Salt Lake City, Utah, Don Fullmer, a brother of former world middleweight champion Gene Fullmer, won the first version by stopping previously unbeaten Joe Hopkins in six rounds. He never defended it. On November 25, 1974, in Columbus, Ohio, Billy Douglas, the father of future world heavyweight champion James "Buster" Douglas, halted Danny Brewer in two rounds to win the Ohio Commission's version of the world junior light heavyweight title. He too never made a defense of the title. Then, on April 3, 1982, in Denver, Colorado, Jerry "Wimpy" Halstead stopped Ron Brown in six rounds to win the WAA's inaugural super middleweight title bout. Halstead made one defense, knocking out Darren Encline in one round on May 29, 1982, in Oklahoma City, Oklahoma. Following that fight, Halstead moved up to the light heavyweight class and eventually campaigned as a heavyweight. The media and most commissions did not recognize Fullmer's, Douglas', or Halstead's titles. Nor did they recognize the division during this period.

==== 1984–1989 ====
The current super middleweight division traces its beginning to 1984, when Murray Sutherland defeated Ernie Singletary for the International Boxing Federation version of the title. The World Boxing Association created its version of the super middleweight title when reigning Lineal champion Chong Pal Park defeated Jesus Gallardo in 1987 (Park had been IBF champion before relinquishing the title to fight for the inaugural WBA version). The World Boxing Council crowned its first champion in 1988 when Sugar Ray Leonard defeated Donny Lalonde in a fight that was also for its version of the light heavyweight title.

==== 1990–2007 ====
Since the early 1990s, there has been a highly competitive super middleweight division in Britain and Ireland, including the rivalry between Nigel Benn, Chris Eubank, and Michael Watson, which included two memorable fights and the tragic injury to Watson, followed by the emergence of Steve Collins, who defeated Benn and Eubank, before retiring and vacating the title, as well as the 10-year reign of Joe Calzaghe. In addition, fellow Brits Richie Woodhall and Robin Reid also held versions of the title between 1996–97 and 1997–98. During this decade, Americans James Toney and Roy Jones Jr. also reigned as champions. In 2007, two champions of the division, the undefeated Calzaghe and the likewise undefeated Mikkel Kessler, had a title unification fight which Calzaghe won by a unanimous decision to become the unified super middleweight champion of the world.

==== 2008–present ====
At the end of the 2000s and start of the 2010s the division was one of the most active in boxing with the likes of Lucian Bute, Andre Ward, Andre Dirrell, Carl Froch, George Groves, Mikkel Kessler, Anthony Mundine, Arthur Abraham, Robert Stieglitz, Sakio Bika, Allan Green, Jesse Brinkley, Librado Andrade, Edison Miranda and Jermain Taylor. This was showcased with Showtime's, Super Six World Boxing Classic that sought out to find the best super middleweight in the world at the time. Andre Ward went on to defeat Carl Froch by unanimous decision and win the tournament in late 2011.

On November 6, 2021, Canelo Álvarez became the first undisputed champion of the division in the four belt era.

=== Current world champions ===
Sanctioning body	Reign began	Champion	Record	Defenses
WBA	May 2, 2026	Jaime Munguía	46–2 (35 KO)	0
WBC	October 31, 2026	Canelo Álvarez	64–3–2 (39 KO)	0
IBF	April 9, 2026	Osleys Iglesias	15–0 (14 KO)	0
WBO		vacant		

=== Current world rankings ===
==== The Ring ====
As of May 30, 2026.

Keys:

C Current The Ring world champion

Rank	Name	Record (W–L–D)	Title(s)
C	vacant		
1	Canelo Álvarez	63–3–2 (39 KO)	
2	Osleys Iglesias	15–0 (14 KO)	IBF
3	Christian M'billi	29–0–1 (24 KO)	WBC
4	Lester Martínez	20–0–1 (16 KO)	WBC (Interim)
5	Jaime Munguia	46–2 (35 KO)	WBA
6	Diego Paheco	25–0 (18 KO)	
7	Armando Resendiz	16–3 (11 KO)	
8	Jacob Bank	19–0 (11 KO)	
9	Hamzah Sheeraz	23–0–1 (19 KO)	WBO
10	Caleb Plant	23–3 (14 KO)	

==== BoxRec ====
As of 30 May 2026.

Rank	Name	Record (W–L–D)	Title(s)
1	Saul Álvarez	63–3–2 (39 KO)	
2	Hamzah Sheeraz	23–0–1 (19 KO)	WBO
3	Osleys Iglesias	15–0 (14 KO)	IBF
4	Diego Pacheco	25–0 (18 KO)	
5	Jermall Charlo	34–0 (23 KO)	
6	Christian M'Billi	29–0–1 (24 KO)	WBC
7	Jaime Munguia	46–3 (35 KO)	WBA
8	Jacob Bank	19–0 (11 KO)	
9	Kévin Lele Sadjo	28–1 (25 KO)	
10	Lester Martínez	20–0–1 (16 KO)	WBC (Interim)

=== Longest reigning world super middleweight champions ===
Below is a list of longest reigning super middleweight champions in boxing measured by the individual's longest reign. Career total time as champion (for multiple title reigns) does not apply.

	Name	Title reign	Title recognition	Successful defenses	Beaten opponents	Fights
1.	Joe Calzaghe	10 years, 11 months, 22 days	WBO	21	20	
2.	Andre Ward	5 years, 11 months, 21 days	WBA (Super)	6	6	
3.	Sven Ottke	5 years, 5 months, 3 days	IBF	21	20	
4.	Frankie Liles	4 years, 10 months, 0 days	WBA	7	7	
5.	Canelo Álvarez	4 years, 8 months, 26 days	WBA, WBC, IBF, WBO	9	9	
6.	Lucian Bute	4 years, 7 months, 7 days	IBF	9	8	
7.	Chris Eubank	4 years, 4 months, 0 days	WBO	14	13	
8.	Park Chong-pal	3 years, 7 months, 17 days	IBF, WBA	10	8	
9.	Nigel Benn	3 years, 4 months, 28 days	WBC	9	9	
10.	Gilberto Ramirez	3 years, 1 month, 5 days	WBO	5	4	
11.	Robert Stieglitz	3 years, 0 months, 3 days	WBO	6	6	

Active reign
Reign has ended

== Kickboxing ==
- International Kickboxing Federation (IKF) Super Middleweight (Pro & Amateur) 165.1 - 172 lb (75.1 - 78.2 kg)

== Mixed martial arts ==
In MMA, the Super middleweight division is from 186 lbs (84 kg) to 195 lb (88 kg).
