= KSI vs. Logan Paul II =

2019 professional YouTube boxing match

KSI vs Logan Paul II
- Date: November 9, 2019
- Venue: Staples Center, Los Angeles, California, U.S.
- Title(s) on the line: WBC (YouTube II) cruiserweight title

Tale of the tape
Boxer	KSI	Logan Paul
Nickname	The Nightmare	The Maverick
Hometown	Watford, England	Westlake, Ohio, USA
Pre-fight record	0–0	0–0
Age	26 years, 4 months	24 years, 7 months
Height	6 ft 0 in (183 cm)	6 ft 2 in (187 cm)
Weight	193.2 lb (87.6 kg)	199.4 lb (90.4 kg)
Style	Orthodox	Orthodox

Result
- KSI wins by split decision in 6 rounds (57–54, 56–55, 55–56)

KSI vs. Logan Paul II was a cruiserweight professional boxing match contested between English YouTuber KSI and American YouTuber Logan Paul. The bout was held on November 9, 2019, at Staples Center in Los Angeles, California. KSI defeated Paul via split decision, with two judges scoring the bout 56–55 and 57–54 in favour of KSI, and a third judge scoring the fight 56–55 in favour of Paul.

On the undercard, Billy Joe Saunders successfully defended the WBO super middleweight title against Marcelo Coceres, and Devin Haney was also successful in his defence of the WBC lightweight title against Alfredo Santiago. The decision to have two world-title bouts on the undercard, beneath the two YouTubers, was criticised, with some going as far as describing the event as an 'insult' to boxing. However, a number of figures within the sport, including professional boxers, were receptive to the event and highlighted the professionalism of Paul and KSI – both of whom received coaching from previous world champion coaches and boxers – as well as their intention to bring a new audience to the sport of boxing. The fight sold 2 million PPV buys.

== Background and build-up ==
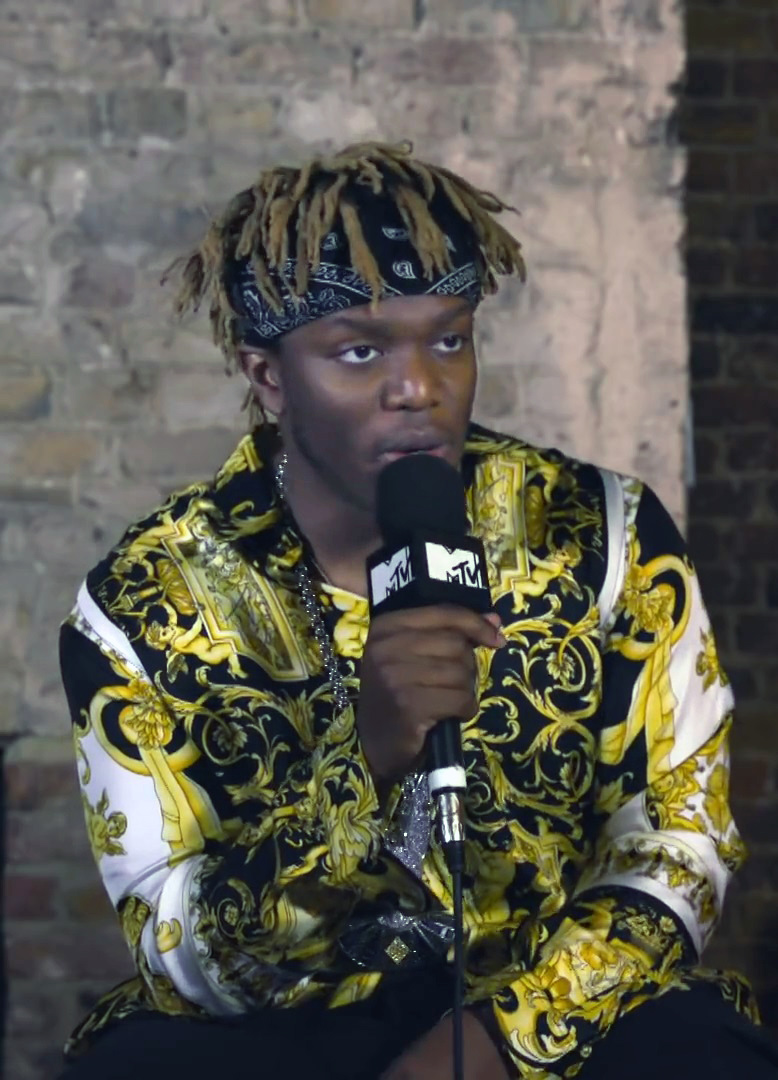
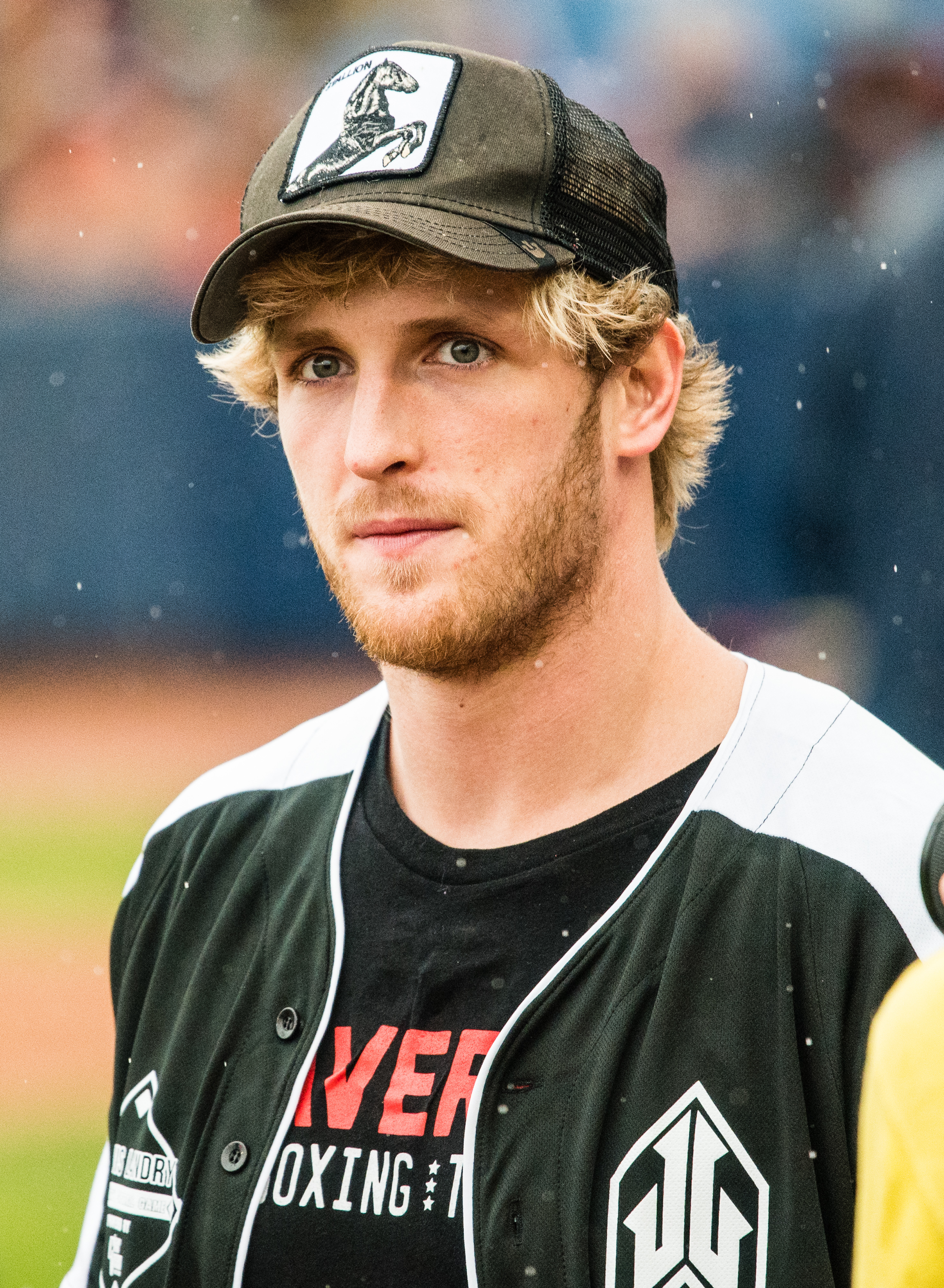
KSI (left) and Logan Paul (right) both made their professional debuts on the night of the bout.

After the successful first fight against Paul, KSI requested for the second fight to be postponed until May 2019. Citing the difference in time-zones and the potential for the fight to be too late for some UK viewers, KSI said he would prefer the bout to take place in New York City. On August 28, 2018, it was announced that the fight would take place in May 2019 in an undetermined United States venue, provided neither KSI nor Paul opted out, though a date in May was never agreed. On September 3, 2019, KSI and Paul announced via Instagram that the fight would take place on November 9, 2019, at the Staples Center, Los Angeles and that it would be a professional bout, with no head guards—unlike the previous bout. The announcement confirmed that the fight would be promoted by Eddie Hearn's Matchroom Boxing.

=== Press conferences ===
Three press conferences were held in the following cities:

- September 14, 2019 – Outside the Staples Center, Los Angeles
- October 7, 2019 – The Troxy Theatre, London
- November 7, 2019 – The Hollywood Restaurant Tao, Los Angeles

=== Coaches ===
Paul's main coach for the fight was two-time heavyweight champion, Shannon Briggs, while KSI trained under up-and-coming professional boxer, Viddal Riley, and Jeff Mayweather, uncle of Floyd Mayweather Jr. As a professional event, only fighters with professional boxing licences, and no other YouTubers, were allowed to participate; this decision was met with contention from some in the YouTube community who were hoping to see others participate in what was originally a 'YouTube' event.

=== Criticism ===
Upon its announcement as a professional bout, the event drew criticism from a number of figures within boxing, as well as boxing journalists and fans, some of whom labelled the fight as an 'insult' to boxing. The headline accusation was that the pair were using the event as a 'cash grab' and questioned the 'legitimacy' of the match as a professional bout, and many questioned the choice of putting professional world-title bouts on the undercard beneath two YouTubers. Others within the sport, however, were more receptive to the fight and embraced the event. The executive director of the California State Athletic Commission (the fight's sanctioning body), Andy Foster, defended the accusation that the YouTubers weren't fit to fight professionally, saying in an interview that "If they weren’t YouTube stars, this fight is still approvable in every commission in this country as debut athletes". Kevin Draper of The New York Times notes KSI, Paul and the organisers' intention to bring a new audience to a 'stagnant' sport and highlights the fact both YouTubers sought coaching from world-champion boxers and trainers. Professional boxers Anthony Joshua, Deontay Wilder, Tyson Fury, Dillian Whyte and Andy Ruiz Jr. also expressed support for the event and the fact it was being held as a professional bout, highlighting the benefit it could bring to boxing in terms of expanding the sport's audience.

== Fight summary ==
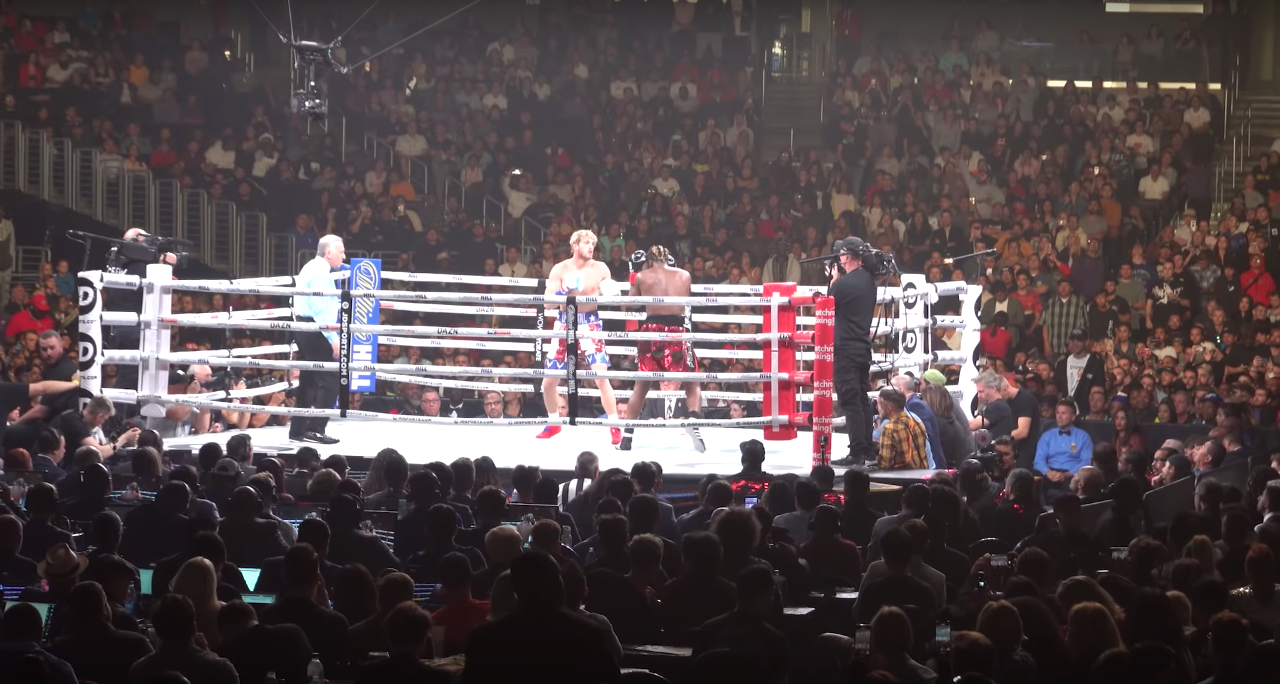
KSI and Logan Paul during their fight

The weigh-in took place at 1 pm PST on 8 November at the Xbox Plaza in Los Angeles. Paul stepped on the scales first, weighing in at 199.4lbs, just under the 200lbs cruiserweight limit, while KSI weighed in at 193.4lbs, just over 6lbs lighter, before the pair shared a brief head to head. Paul entered the ring first, sporting a red-white-and-blue robe and shorts and accompanied by his brother, Jake Paul, and musician Justin Bieber; KSI then entered the arena donning a red-and-black robe, shorts and mask, as American rappers Rick Ross and Lil Baby, and British singer and producer S-X performed KSI's newly released song, titled "Down Like That", on which they feature. After they entered, God Save the Queen and The Star-Spangled Banner were performed by Brian King Joseph and Nova Miller, respectively.

The first three rounds were controlled by KSI, who offloaded more punches and appeared the aggressor, while Paul employed a more cautious approach, throwing more tentative jabs. On the back foot after the first two rounds, Paul slipped to the canvas twice in the third round, before KSI landed an overhand right behind Paul's ear – enough to send Paul to the canvas – but no knockdown was called by the referee. A chaotic fourth round saw Paul land a clean uppercut on KSI, but for the second uppercut which followed Paul had his other arm around the back of KSI's head. The illegal blow was enough to send the Briton falling to the canvas. On KSI's way down, Paul broke KSI's fall and offloaded a further illegal punch to the back of his head, then hit him once more when he reached the canvas. What was originally unanimously scored as a 10–8 round in favour of Paul for scoring a knockdown was negated by a two-point deduction from Paul's card for the illegal back-of-the-head blows. As well as deducting Paul points, the referee allowed KSI time to regain his composure before resuming the fight. The fifth round was a closer contest, with Paul landing the more meaningful jabs while KSI stayed out of any trouble. The sixth and final round matched the frantic pace of the first as both fighters swung wildly in a last attempt to snatch victory, but neither could land a decisive knockout blow.

After six rounds, the fight resulted in a split decision victory for KSI, with two judges scoring the bout 57–54 and 56–55 in favor of KSI, and a third scoring it 56–55 in favour of Paul. After the split decision victory, Paul and KSI shook hands and shared an embrace after the fight, with both paying respect to one another, though Paul stated his intention to contest the commission for his point deduction for his illegal punches, stating that he does not dispute what happened but thought he deserved only a warning. Paul did indeed appeal the decision, but the appeal was denied in early December 2019. When asked about a possible rematch, Paul expressed his support for the idea, but KSI rejected any prospect of a third fight against Paul, saying "It's done ... I'm on to the next thing".

=== Scorecard ===
Lou Moret		Patrick Russell		Zachary Young	
KSI	Paul	KSI	Paul	KSI	Paul
56	55	57	54	55	56

== Fight card ==
Weight Class		vs.		Method	Round	Time	Notes
Cruiserweight	KSI	def.	Logan Paul	SD	6/6	—	^{Note 1}^{,} ^{2}
Super middleweight	Billy Joe Saunders (c)	def.	Marcelo Cóceres	TKO	11/12	1:59	^{Note 3}
Lightweight	Devin Haney (c)	def.	Alfredo Santiago	UD	12/12	—	^{Note 4}
Super middleweight	Nikita Ababiy	def.	Jonathan Batista	DQ	1/4	—
Super bantamweight	Ronny Rios	def.	Hugo Berrio	KO	4/12	2:56
Super middleweight	Diego Pacheco	def.	Aaron Casper	KO	4/6	2:56
Super welterweight	Reshat Mati	def.	Cody Peterson	KO	2/6	1:41
Cruiserweight	Josh Brueckner	def.	Tyler Smith	UD	4/4	—	^{Note 5}^{,} ^{6}

^Note 1 KSI's professional debut
^Note 2 Paul's professional debut
^Note 3 For WBO super middleweight title
^Note 4 For WBC lightweight title
^Note 5 Brueckner's professional debut
^Note 6 Smith's professional debut

== Fight details ==
=== Attendance ===
KSI vs. Logan II had an attendance of 12,000 people in which a number of celebrities were in attendance. This included Canadian singer Justin Bieber, Paul's brother Jake Paul, Wiz Khalifa, Post Malone, former UFC welterweight champion Tyron Woodley, Dan Bilzerian, Mike Tyson, as well as all the members of KSI's former YouTube group, the Sidemen.

=== Broadcasting ===
The fight was streamed live on DAZN in the United States and seven other countries. The fight was broadcast live on Sky Sports Box Office in the United Kingdom and Ireland for a fee of £9.95. The fight was streamed live on FITE TV in the countries where the rights are not sold. Due to piracy concerns, the fight was not broadcast on YouTube, like the previous event, this event lost an estimated 1.4 million potential pay-per-view buys to pirated Twitch streams. On British radio, the fight aired on BBC Radio 5 Live.

On DAZN, it was the third most streamed fight of 2019 across nine markets, behind only Andy Ruiz Jr. vs. Anthony Joshua II and Canelo Álvarez vs. Sergey Kovalev. On Sky Sports Box Office, the fight sold 216,000 PPV buys in the United Kingdom. In August 2022, Eddie Hearn would reveal that the fight sold 2 million PPV buys worldwide, which would later be backed up on Twitter by KSI's manager Mams Taylor.

Country/Region	Broadcasters				
	Free-to-air	Cable/Pay television	Stream		PPV
International (unsold markets)	—N/a				FITE TV
United States (host)	—N/a				
Austria	—N/a				
Brazil	—N/a				
Canada	—N/a				
Germany	—N/a				
Italy	—N/a				
Spain	—N/a				
Switzerland	—N/a				
United Kingdom	—N/a				Sky Sports Box Office
Ireland	—N/a				Sky Sports Box Office
Argentina	—N/a	Space	TNT Go	—N/a	
Chile	—N/a	Space	TNT Go	—N/a	
Ecuador	—N/a	Space	TNT Go	—N/a	
Mexico	—N/a	Space	TNT Go	—N/a	
Panama	—N/a	Space	TNT Go	—N/a	
Peru	—N/a	Space	TNT Go	—N/a	
Uruguay	—N/a	Space	TNT Go	—N/a	
Venezuela	—N/a	Space	TNT Go	—N/a	
Brunei	—N/a		Astro GO		Astro Box Office
Malaysia	—N/a		Astro GO		Astro Box Office
China	CCTV-5		CNTV	—N/a	
Indonesia	Mola TV		Mola TV On Demand	—N/a	
Timor-Leste	Mola TV		Mola TV On Demand	—N/a	
New Zealand	—N/a	Sky Sport News	Sky Go	—N/a	
Philippines	5 (delayed)	—N/a			ESPN5 (delayed)
Philippines	5 (delayed)	—N/a			Cignal TV
Philippines	5 (delayed)	—N/a	Eleven Sports	—N/a	
Philippines	5 (delayed)			Sky Sports	
Poland	TVP Sport	—N/a			

As of November 9, 2019

Result	Ladbrokes	BetOnline
KSI	7/4	+160
Logan Paul	8/15	-195
Draw	1/1	+1000

=== Purses ===
Both KSI and Paul earned a minimum of $900,000 for the bout as stipulated in their contract with the California State Athletic Commission, although their final earnings from the fight are expected to be much higher.
