= Shakeel Phinn =

Canadian boxer

Personal information
- Nickname: The Jamaican Juggernaut
- Born: 31 October 1990 (age 35) Brossard, Quebec, Canada
- Weight: Super middleweight

Boxing career
- Stance: Orthodox

Boxing record
- Total fights: 31
- Wins: 26
- Win by KO: 17
- Losses: 3
- Draws: 2

Shakeel Phinn (born October 31, 1990) is a Canadian professional boxer who has held the WBC–NABF and IBF North American super middleweight titles since 2019.

== Early life ==
Phinn was born on October 31, 1990, in Brossard, Quebec, Canada. His father, Benjamin, was an amateur boxer. Phinn played running back at Champlain College Saint-Lambert, where he was named team offensive MVP for the 2010–11 season. He joined oneXone Boxing Gym in Saint-Hubert initially to stay conditioned and work on his footwork. He was quickly drawn into the sport and enrolled as an amateur fighter at the gym, competing in his first amateur bout at the age of 21. Within a year, he won the Quebec provincial championship.

== Professional career ==
Phinn made his professional debut on January 31, 2015, defeating Eddie Gates via fourth-round technical knockout (TKO) in Gatineau, Quebec. However, he lost in his second bout that April against compatriot Roody Rene on the Adonis Stevenson–Sakio Bika undercard in Quebec City. After three straight victories he knocked out the third-ranked Canadian super middleweight Guillaume Tremblay-Coude in November, although he suffered the first knockdown of his career in the fight. Three months later, just over a year after turning pro, he beat hometown hero Paul Bzdel in Saskatoon to win the vacant CPBC national super-middleweight title. His unanimous decision (UD) victory headlined the first night of professional boxing held in the city in 16 years. His eventual sixteen-fight winning streak would be snapped in December 2017, when he suffered his second career loss versus undefeated Mexican prospect Ramón Aguiñaga by majority decision (MD) in Montreal, falling to 16–2.

On December 1, 2018, he faced undefeated American Dario Bredicean for the vacant IBF Inter-Continental super middleweight title on the Adonis Stevenson–Oleksandr Gvozdyk undercard in Quebec City, the night Stevenson suffered a life-threatening brain injury that prematurely ended his career. Phinn battled the Chicago native to a controversial majority draw – one judge scored it 98–92 in clear favor of Phinn, but was overruled by the other two who scored it 95–95. After a win over Mexican journeyman Juan Carlos Raygosa, he defeated Argentine southpaw Elio Germán Rafael on June 8, 2019, by tenth-round TKO for the vacant WBC–NABF and IBF North American super-middleweight titles. In November he travelled to Poland to face undefeated local Mateusz Tryc, losing by UD after eight rounds for the third loss of his career.

== Professional boxing record ==
31 fights	26 wins	3 losses
By knockout	17	0
By decision	8	3
By disqualification	1	0
Draws	2	

No.	Result	Record	Opponent	Type	Round, time	Date	Location	Notes
31	Draw	26–3–2	(Canada) Erik Bazinyan	SD	10	May 2, 2024	Montreal Casino, Montreal, Canada	For NABF and vacant WBA Continental (North America) super middleweight titles
30	Win	26–3–1	(Uruguay) Rafael Sosa Pintos	TKO	1 (8), 2:00	Oct 21, 2023	Pickering Casino Resort, Pickering, Canada	
29	Win	25–3–1	(Canada) Ryan Young	UD	10	May 27, 2023	CAA Centre, Brampton, Canada	
28	Win	24–3–1	(Slovakia) Vladimir Belujsky	UD	10	Nov 12, 2022	CAA Centre, Brampton, Canada	
27	Win	23–3–1	(Mexico) Josué Castañeda Pérez	TKO	7 (8), 0:53	Sep 10, 2022	CAA Centre, Brampton, Canada	
26	Win	22–3–1	(Mexico) Joaquín Murrieta Lucio	UD	6	May 21, 2022	Bell Sports Complex, Brossard, Canada	
25	Loss	21–3–1	(Poland) Mateusz Tryc	UD	8	Nov 30, 2019	Nosalowy Dwór Hotel, Zakopane, Poland	
24	Win	21–2–1	(Argentina) Elio Germán Rafael	TKO	10 (10), 2:34	Jun 8, 2019	Montreal Casino, Montreal, Quebec, Canada	For vacant WBC–NABF and IBF North American super middleweight titles
23	Win	20–2–1	(Mexico) Juan Carlos Raygosa	TKO	5 (8), 1:26	Mar 23, 2019	Montreal Casino, Montreal, Quebec, Canada	
22	Draw	19–2–1	(United States) Dario Bredicean	MD	10	Dec 1, 2018	Centre Vidéotron, Quebec City, Quebec, Canada	For vacant IBF Inter-Continental super middleweight title
21	Win	19–2	(Argentina) Crispulo Javier Andino	TKO	1 (8), 2:30	Oct 20, 2018	Montreal Casino, Montreal, Quebec, Canada	
20	Win	18–2	(Croatia) Mirzet Bajrektarevic	TKO	6 (8), 0:39	Jun 9, 2018	Montreal Casino, Montreal, Quebec, Canada	
19	Win	17–2	(Poland) Bartlomiej Grafka	UD	8	Apr 19, 2018	Montreal Casino, Montreal, Quebec, Canada	
18	Loss	16–2	(Mexico) Ramón Aguiñaga	MD	8	Dec 7, 2017	Montreal Casino, Montreal, Quebec, Canada	
17	Win	16–1	(Mexico) Mario Aguilar	RTD	4 (8), 3:00	Sep 28, 2017	Montreal Casino, Montreal, Quebec, Canada	
16	Win	15–1	(Mexico) Bladimir Hernández Cazares	RTD	4 (10), 3:00	Aug 19, 2017	Festival Arena, Shediac, New Brunswick, Canada	
15	Win	14–1	(Argentina) Pablo Daniel Zamora Nievas	KO	2 (8), 1:18	Jun 15, 2017	Montreal Casino, Montreal, Quebec, Canada	
14	Win	13–1	(Mexico) Josué Aguilar	DQ	10 (10), 1:45	Mar 30, 2017	Montreal Casino, Montreal, Quebec, Canada	
13	Win	12–1	(Mexico) Víctor Manuel Palacios	RTD	3 (8), 3:00	Feb 9, 2017	Montreal Casino, Montreal, Quebec, Canada	
12	Win	11–1	(France) Mehdi Madani	KO	8 (8)	Dec 10, 2016	Montreal Casino, Montreal, Quebec, Canada	
11	Win	10–1	(Canada) Tom Vautour	TKO	3 (6), 0:53	Oct 15, 2016	Aitken Centre, Fredericton, New Brunswick, Canada	
10	Win	9–1	(Finland) Janne Forsman	TKO	3 (8), 1:01	Sep 3, 2016	Tohu, Montreal, Quebec, Canada	
9	Win	8–1	(Mexico) Jaudiel Zepeda	UD	8	May 24, 2016	Montreal Casino, Montreal, Quebec, Canada	
8	Win	7–1	(Mexico) Guillermo Herrera Campos	TKO	8 (8), 1:45	Apr 12, 2016	Fairmont Royal York, Toronto, Ontario, Canada	
7	Win	6–1	(Canada) Paul Bzdel	UD	10	Feb 27, 2016	Prairieland Park, Saskatoon, Saskatchewan, Canada	Won vacant CPBC national super middleweight title
6	Win	5–1	(Canada) Guillaume Tremblay-Coude	KO	6 (6)	Nov 20, 2015	Colisée Cardin, Sorel-Tracy, Quebec, Canada	
5	Win	4–1	(Canada) Chris Aucoin	TKO	3 (6), 2:21	Dec 18, 2015	Bains Mathieu, Montreal, Quebec, Canada	
4	Win	3–1	(Canada) Colato Boakye	UD	4	Aug 11, 2015	Woodbine Convention Hall, Toronto, Quebec, Canada	
3	Win	2–1	(United States) Danny Waters	UD	4	Jul 9, 2015	(United States) Tall Cedar's Hall, Baltimore, Maryland, U.S.	
2	Loss	1–1	(Canada) Roody Rene	UD	4	Apr 4, 2015	Colisée Pepsi, Quebec City, Quebec, Canada	
1	Win	1–0	(United States) Eddie Gates	TKO	4 (4), 1:27	Jan 31, 2015	Hilton Lac Leamy, Gatineau, Quebec, Canada	

== Personal life ==
He co-owns the Donnybrook Boxing Gym in Saint-Henri, Montreal with fellow pro fighter Ian MacKillop. Within a year of its opening, it housed more professional fighters than any other gym in the country.
