= Erik Bazinyan =

Canadian boxer (born 1995)

Personal information
- Nickname: Bzo
- Nationality: Canadian; Armenian
- Born: 21 May 1995 (age 31) Yerevan, Armenia
- Height: 1.85 m (6 ft 1 in)
- Weight: Super Middleweight; Light Heavyweight

Boxing career
- Stance: Orthodox

Boxing record
- Total fights: 35
- Wins: 33
- Win by KO: 24
- Losses: 1
- Draws: 1

Erik Bazinyan (born 21 May 1995) Is an Armenian-born, Canadian-based boxer who has held the NABF and NABA super middleweight titles.

== Biography ==
Erik Bazinyan was born in Yerevan, Armenia and currently resides in Laval, Quebec, Canada, Erik Bazinyan states that he had an amateur career with a record of 108 wins and 1 loss, Bazinyan lost his father in 2022 which made him focus on his family before returning to boxing in February 2023.

== Professional career ==
=== Early career ===
Bazinyan began his career as a light heavyweight, winning his first seven fights in the division from 2014 to 2015 as an 18 to 19 years old. On 27 March 2015, Bazinyan moved down to super middleweight and knocked Morgan Le Gal in the 5th round of their match.

==== Bazinyan vs. Schwartz ====
On 3 September 2016, Bazinyan fought Aro Schwartz for the vacant WBO Youth super middleweight title in a 10 rounder bout, with Bazinyan earning the unanimous decision victory.

==== Bazinyan vs. Zegarra ====
On 23 June 2018, Bazinyan fought a fresh from a loss in an inter-continental titled match Peruvian David Zegarra for the vacant NABO super middleweight title. Bazinyan slowly started with huge right hands that hurts Zegarra and on the hurt Zegarra badly in the third round, but Zegarra was saved by the bell, Bazinyan downed Zegarra twice in the next round, prompting the referee to stop the bout.

==== Bazinyan vs. Ntetu ====
On 13 October 2018, Bazinyan was scheduled to defend his NABO super middleweight title against Francy Ntetu, the vacant NABA super middleweight title was also put at stake, on the natch, Bazinyan downed Ntetu in the sixth round, Ntetu later went recovered but Bazinyan knocked him down with flurry of punches, prompting the referee to halt the contest.

Bazinyan successfully defended his NABO and NABA titles against Ricardo Adrian Luna and Alan Campa who he dominated in all 10 rounds.

==== Bazinyan vs. Román ====
On 13 December 2019, Erik Bazinyan fought Mexican veteran boxer, Saúl Román in a non-titled bout, on the night of the match, Bazinyan started with a halting work but slowly began to make notable progress and on the starting moments of the third round Bazinyan floored Román with a hard short-shot right hand, which Román didn't recover from.

==== COVID-19 pandemic ====
Before the COVID-19 pandemic, Bazinyan defeated Finland's Timo Laine via technical knockout, but due to inactivity because of the pandemic, the NABO title was stripped off him, yet Bazinyan kept the NABA title.

==== Bazinyan vs. Sigmon ====
On 4 June 2021, Erik Bazinyan returned to boxing and put his NABA title on the line against Scott Sigmon, while the vacant NABF super middleweight title awaits in Cuernavaca, Mexico, in the second round of the match, Erik Bazinyan scored a knockout win against Sigmon.

On 12 February 2022, it was announced that Bazinyan would fight Reinaldo Paniagua, and was successful on retaining his NABF super middleweight title via technical knockout.. Later his NABA title got vacated, but on 28 April 2022, it was announced that he would defend his NABF super middleweight title, while the vacant NABA was put on the line on Bazinyan's bout against tough and resilient Argentinian boxer, Marcelo Cóceres, Bazinyan successfully defended his NABF title and regained his NABA title via unanimous decision as he dominated.

==== Bazinyan vs. Fox ====
On 15 December 2022, it was announced that Bazinyan would fight former WBA (Regular) super middleweight title challenger, Alantez Fox on 2 February 2023, at Montreal, at the same time, the NABF and NABA super middleweight titles were at stake, Bazinyan earned a majority decision win; he earned the scores of 98–92 two times and 95–95.

==== Bazinyan vs. Macias ====
On 5 April 2023, it was announced that Bazinyan was scheduled to defend his NABF and NABA super middleweight titles against former NABF middleweight champion and veteran Mexican boxer, Jose de Jesus Macias. During the fight, Bazinyan showed magnificent performances from the starting round to the middle round, until in the 7th round, Macias unexpectedly caught him with a hard right hand that made Bazinyan wobble, but Bazinyan was able to stay on his feet and later continued to be in control until the dying moments of the bout.

==== Bazinyan vs. Ellis ====
On 24 August, Bazinyan's next fight was announced to be Ronald Ellis. Ellis, who previously fought David Benavidez and Christian Mbili, was expected to remain a strong challenger against Bazinyan, despite not competing in a professional bout for nearly two years. During the fight, on 11 October, both made notable progress, but on the 6th round, out of nowhere, Bazinyan rocked Ellis with two right hands that dropped Ellis down. Ellis was able to recover but the referee halted the contest, making this the quickest loss of Ellis, prior to his previous bouts.

==== Bazinyan vs. Godoy ====
On 1 December 2023, a scheduled fight between Erik Bazinyan and Argentinian veteran boxer, Billi Facundo Godoy on 25 January 2024 is announced, with Bazinyan's NABF super middleweight title being at stake, despite being Bazinyan's 32nd bout without any losses, the 28 years old Bazinyan is still looking to progress more instead of willing to compete in any world championships yet, despite his top 5 rankings in every boxing organizations on the super middleweight division. Bazinyan would make a rather quick victory as he prevails against Godoy with an impressive combination which Godoy did not beat the 10-seconds count from, Bazinyan therefore retains his NABF title.

==== Bazinyan vs. Phinn ====
Bazinyan was scheduled to make the seventh defense of his NABF super middleweight title and for the vacant WBA Continental (North America) super middleweight title against veteran Shakeel Phinn on April 11, 2024, however the fight was postponed to May 2, 2024, after Bazinyan became ill. Bazinyan earned his first draw against Phinn in a rather controversial fashion after being outclassed by Phinn.

==== Bazinyan vs. Munguia ====
Bazinyan was scheduled to face Jaime Munguia in a super middleweight bout at Desert Diamond Arena in Glendale, AZ on September 20, 2024. Bazinyan lost the fight by knockout in the 10th round.

==== Bazinyan vs. Butler ====
Bazinyan was scheduled to face Steven Butler in Montreal, Quebec, Canada on March 14, 2025. On February 26, 2025 it was reported that Bazinyan suffered an injury, a sprain of the deltoid ligament in his right ankle, and the fight was canceled. On April 23, 2025, it was reported that the fight was rescheduled for June 27, 2025, in Québec City, Canada. After the fight was once again postponed, on September 12, 2025, it was announced that the new date for the event would be November 13, 2025, in Montreal. The fight was cancelled once more after Bazinyan sustained an unspecified injury. The boxers finally met at Montreal Casino on November 13, 2026, with Bazinyan winning by technical knockout after he sent his opponent to the canvas early in the 10th and final round and, although Butler got back to his feet to beat the 10-count, the referee decided he was not fit to continue and waved the bout off.

== Professional boxing record ==
35 fights	33 wins	1 loss
By knockout	24	1
By decision	9	0
Draws	1	

No.	Result	Record	Opponent	Type	Round, Time	Date	Location	Notes
35	Win	33–1–1	(Canada) Steven Butler	TKO	10 (10), 0:22	12 Nov 2026	Montreal Casino, Montreal, Canada	
34	Loss	32–1–1	(Mexico) Jaime Munguía	KO	10 (12), 2:36	20 Sep 2024	(United States) Desert Diamond Arena, Glendale, Arizona, U.S.	Lost WBC-NABF super middleweight title; For WBC Silver super middleweight title
33	Draw	32–0–1	(Canada) Shakeel Phinn	SD	10	02 May 2024	Montreal Casino, Montreal, Canada	Retained WBC-NABF super middleweight title; For vacant WBA Continental (Americas) super middleweight title
32	Win	32–0	(Argentina) Billi Facundo Godoy	TKO	3 (10), 2:23	25 Jan 2024	Montreal Casino, Montreal, Canada	Retained WBC-NABF super middleweight title
31	Win	31–0	(United States) Ronald Ellis	KO	6 (10), 1:44	11 Oct 2023	Montreal Casino, Montreal, Canada	Retained WBC-NABF and WBA-NABA super middleweight titles
30	Win	30–0	(Mexico) Jose de Jesus Macias	UD	10	1 Jun 2023	Montreal Casino, Montreal, Canada	Retained WBC-NABF and WBA-NABA super middleweight titles
29	Win	29–0	(United States) Alantez Fox	MD	10	2 Feb 2023	Montreal Casino, Montreal, Canada	Retained WBC-NABF and WBA-NABA super middleweight titles
28	Win	28–0	(Argentina) Marcelo Cóceres	UD	10	23 Jun 2022	Montreal Casino, Montreal, Canada	Retained WBC-NABF super middleweight title; Won vacant WBA-NABA super middleweight title
27	Win	27–0	(Mexico) Reinaldo Paniagua	TKO	9 (10), 1:10	3 Mar 2022	Montreal, Quebec, Canada	Retained WBC-NABF super middleweight title
26	Win	26–0	(United States) Scott Sigmon	TKO	2 (10), 1:55	4 Jun 2021	Hotel Holiday Inn, Cuernavaca, Mexico	Retained WBA-NABA super middleweight title; Won vacant WBC-NABF super middleweight title
25	Win	25–0	(Finland) Timo Laine	TKO	6 (10), 0:45	21 Feb 2020	Le Centre Financier Sun Life, Rimouski, Canada	
24	Win	24–0	(Mexico) Saúl Román	KO	3 (8), 0:46	13 Dec 2019	(United States) Fantasy Springs Resort Casino, Indio, California, U.S.	
23	Win	23–0	(Mexico) Alan Campa	UD	10	2 May 2019	(United States) Hard Rock Hotel & Casino, The Joint, Paradise, Nevada, U.S.	Retained WBO-NABO and WBA-NABA super middleweight titles
22	Win	22–0	(Mexico) Ricardo Adrian Luna	TKO	5 (10), 1:41	14 Dec 2018	Shaw Conference Centre, Edmonton, Canada	Retained WBO-NABO and WBA-NABA super middleweight titles
21	Win	21–0	(Canada) Francy Ntetu	TKO	6 (10), 1:30	13 Oct 2018	Montreal Casino, Montreal, Canada	Retained WBO-NABO super middleweight title; Won vacant WBA-NABA super middleweight title
20	Win	20–0	(Peru) David Zegarra	TKO	4 (10), 2:45	23 Jun 2018	Montreal Casino, Montreal, Canada	Won vacant WBO-NABO super middleweight title
19	Win	19–0	(Argentina) Alejandro Gustavo Falliga	TKO	3 (8), 1:38	26 May 2018	Centre Vidéotron, Quebec City, Canada	
18	Win	18–0	(Hungary) Ferenc Albert	TKO	3 (8), 2:35	31 Mar 2018	Montreal Casino, Montreal, Canada	
17	Win	17–0	(Germany) Bernard Donfack	KO	2 (8), 1:16	9 Sep 2017	Tohu, Montreal, Canada	
16	Win	16–0	(Mexico) Rolando Paredes	TKO	4 (8), 1:43	10 Jun 2017	Tohu, Montreal, Canada	
15	Win	15–0	(Montenegro) Alis Sijaric	TKO	4 (8), 2:00	8 Apr 2017	Tohu, Montreal, Canada	
14	Win	14–0	(Germany) Aro Schwartz	UD	10	3 Sep 2016	Tohu, Montreal, Canada	Won vacant WBO Youth super middleweight title
13	Win	13–0	(Hungary) Zoltan Sera	KO	2 (8), 2:02	17 Jun 2016	Tohu, Montreal, Canada	
12	Win	12–0	(Hungary) Gergo Horvath	KO	2 (8), 1:22	12 Mar 2016	Tohu, Montreal, Canada	
11	Win	11–0	(Poland) Michal Ludwiczak	UD	8	21 Jan 2016	Montreal Casino, Montreal, Canada	
10	Win	10–0	(Canada) Roody Rene	TKO	4 (6), 2:36	24 Oct 2015	Complexe Sportif Gilles Tremblay, Repentigny, Canada	
9	Win	9–0	(Germany) LeeAnthony Spitzka	KO	3 (6), 2:57	15 Aug 2015	Bell Centre, Montreal, Canada	
8	Win	8–0	(France) Morgan Le Gal	TKO	5 (6), 2:38	27 Mar 2015	Olympia Theatre, Montreal, Canada	
7	Win	7–0	(Mexico) Victor Manuel Palacios	KO	1 (6), 2:33	7 Nov 2014	Château Vaudreuil, Vaudreuil-Dorion, Canada	
6	Win	6–0	(France) Baptiste Castegnaro	UD	6	27 Sep 2014	Bell Centre, Montreal, Canada	
5	Win	5–0	(Canada) Gary Kopas	UD	6	28 Jun 2014	Soccerplexe Catalogna, Lachine, Canada	
4	Win	4–0	(Mexico) Jaudiel Zepeda	UD	4	24 May 2014	Bell Centre, Montreal, Canada	
3	Win	3–0	(Canada) Alexandre Bouvier	TKO	3 (6), 2:28	21 Mar 2014	Holiday Inn, Pointe-Claire, Canada	
2	Win	2–0	(Canada) Ahmad Selemani	TKO	4 (4), 1:16	8 Nov 2013	Holiday Inn, Pointe-Claire, Canada	
1	Win	1–0	(Canada) Matt Heim	KO	1 (4), 0:33	21 Sep 2013	Halifax Forum, Halifax, Canada	

== Career rankings ==
As of February 2024, Erik Bazinyan is ranked No. 14 in active super middleweight boxers in accordance to BoxRec and No. 6 by The Ring.

He is ranked No. 3 on WBC, No. 2 on WBA, No. 5 on IBF and No. 3 on WBO super middleweight rankings.

Sporting positions
Youth boxing titles
Vacant Title last held by Tim-Robin Lihaug	WBO Youth super middleweight champion 3 September 2016 – ~2017; Vacated	Vacant Title next held by Renato Egedi
Regional boxing titles
Vacant Title last held by Jesse Hart	NABO super middleweight champion 23 June 2018 – ~2019/2020; Vacated	Vacant Title next held by Steven Nelson
Vacant Title last held by Adonis Stevenson	NABA super middleweight champion 13 October 2018 – 20 February 2020; Stripped	Vacant Title next held by Erik Bazinyan
Vacant Title last held by Erik Bazinyan	NABA super middleweight champion 4 June 2021 – ~June 2022; Vacated	Vacant Title next held by Erik Bazinyan
Vacant Title last held by Lexson Mathieu	NABF super middleweight champion 4 June 2021 – Present	Incumbent
Vacant Title last held by Erik Bazinyan	NABA super middleweight champion 23 Jun 2022 – ~2024; Vacated	Vacant; Incumbent
