= Darius Fulghum =

American boxer (born 1996)

Personal information
- Nickname: DFG
- Nationality: American
- Born: Darius Sherrod Fulghum; September 4, 1996 (age 30) El Paso, Texas, U.S.
- Height: 6 ft 1 in (185 cm)
- Weight: Super middleweight

Boxing career
- Reach: 73 in (185 cm)
- Stance: Orthodox

Boxing record
- Total fights: 18
- Wins: 16
- Win by KO: 13
- Losses: 1
- Draws: 1

Darius Fulghum (born September 4, 1996) is an American professional boxer.

== Professional career ==
With a record of 15-1-1, Fulghum challenged WBC Silver and WBO International super-middleweight champion Diego Pacheco at Dignity Health Sports Park in Carson, California, on November 14, 2026. He won via unanimous decision despite being docked a point in the ninth round for repeatedly hitting his opponent behind the head.

== Professional boxing record ==
18 fights	16 wins	1 loss
By knockout	13	0
By decision	3	1
Draws	1	

No.	Result	Record	Opponent	Type	Round, time	Date	Location	Notes
18	Win	16–1–1	Diego Pacheco	UD	12	Nov 14, 2026	Dignity Health Sports Park, Carson, California, U.S.	Won WBO International and WBC Silver super middleweight titles
17	Win	15–1–1	Yoanki Urrutia	KO	3 (10), 3:00	May 22, 2026	SAP Center, San Jose, California, U.S.	
16	Draw	14–1–1	David Stevens	MD	10	Nov 8, 2025	Dickies Arena, Fort Worth, Nevada, US	
15	Loss	14–1	Bektemir Melikuziev	UD	12	May 30, 2025	The Theater at Virgin Hotels, Paradise, Nevada, US	
14	Win	14–0	Winfred Harris Jr	KO	4 (10), 2:18	Feb 15, 2025	Honda Center, Anaheim, California, U.S.	Retained WBA Continental USA super middleweight title
13	Win	13–0	Christopher Pearson	TKO	3 (10), 1:02	Nov 2, 2024	The Theater at Virgin Hotels, Paradise, Nevada, US	Retained WBA Inter Continental super middleweight title
12	Win	12–0	Vaughn Alexander	UD	10	Jun 27, 2024	Fantasy Springs Casino, Indio, California, U.S.	
11	Win	11–0	Cristian Olivas	TKO	4 (8), 0:50	Apr 20, 2024	Barclays Center, New York City, New York, U.S.	
10	Win	10–0	Alantez Fox	MD	10	Jan 27, 2024	Footprint Center, Phoenix, Arizona, U.S.	Won vacant WBA Inter Continental super middleweight title
9	Win	9–0	Pachino Hill	TKO	2 (8), 0:56	Dec 2, 2023	Toyota Center, Houston, Texas, U.S.	Won vacant WBA Continental USA super middleweight title
8	Win	8–0	Alan Campa	KO	1 (8), 2:58	Oct 7, 2023	The Cosmopolitan, Paradise, Nevada, U.S.	
7	Win	7–0	Ricardo Adrian Luna	KO	2 (8), 1:30	Sep 16, 2023	Commerce Casino, Commerce, California, U.S.	
6	Win	6–0	Jeremiah Curtright	TKO	3 (4), 2:17	Jul 8, 2023	AT&T Center, San Antonio, Texas, U.S.	
5	Win	5–0	Symari Alexander	TKO	6 (6), 1:56	Jun 3, 2023	Galveston Island Convention Center, Galveston, Texas, U.S.	
4	Win	4–0	Jay Williams	TKO	2 (4), 0:58	Apr 29, 2023	College Park Center, Arlington, Texas, U.S.	
3	Win	3–0	David Murray	KO	2 (6), 1:49	Aug 10, 2022	Garden Theater, Detroit, Michigan, U.S.	
2	Win	2–0	Nosa Divine Nehikhare	RTD	3 (6), 3:00	Apr 16, 2022	AT&T Stadium, Arlington, Texas, U.S.	
1	Win	1–0	Juan Emmanuel Navarrete Liera	TKO	1 (4), 1:56	Dec 16, 2021	Arena La Paz, La Paz, Mexico	
