= Ryan Garcia =

American boxer (born 1998)

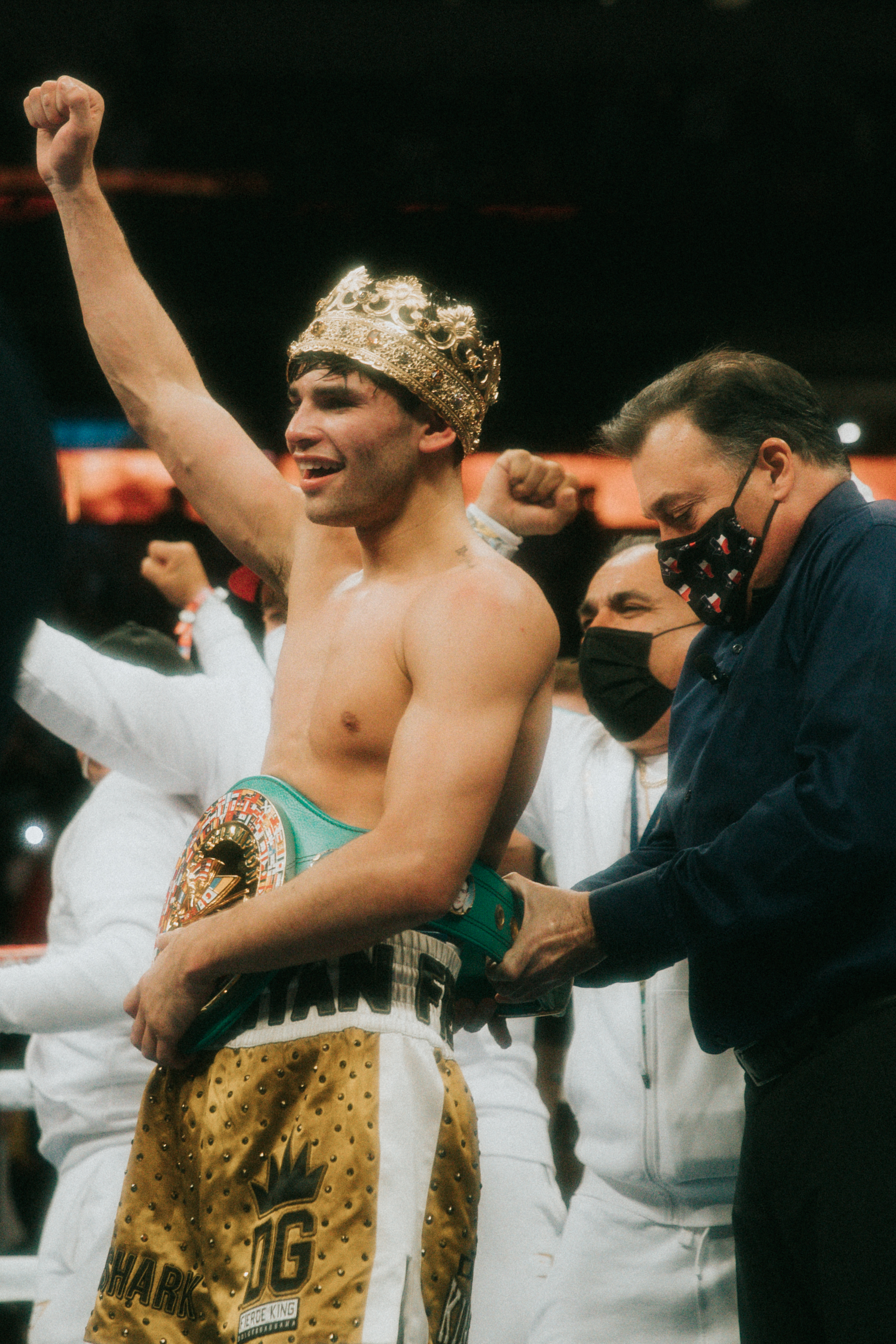
- Garcia in 2021

Personal information
- Nicknames: King Ry; The Flash
- Born: August 8, 1998 (age 28) Victorville, California, U.S.
- Height: 5 ft 8 1/2 in (174 cm)
- Weight: Super featherweight; Lightweight; Light welterweight; Welterweight

Boxing career
- Reach: 70 in (178 cm)
- Stance: Orthodox

Boxing record
- Total fights: 29
- Wins: 26
- Win by KO: 21
- Losses: 2
- Draws: 0
- No contests: 1
Medal record
Men's Amateur boxing
National PAL Championships
Silver medal – second place	2013 Oxnard	Bantamweight
Gold medal – first place	2014 Oxnard	Featherweight
Junior National Championships
Silver medal – second place	2014 Reno	Featherweight
Junior Olympic National Championships
Silver medal – second place	2014 Charleston	Featherweight
Youth National Championships
Gold medal – first place	2016 Reno	Lightweight

Ryan Garcia (born August 8, 1998) is an American professional boxer. He has held the World Boxing Council (WBC) welterweight title since 2026. He previously held the WBC interim lightweight title in 2021.

== Amateur career ==
Garcia started boxing at the age of seven and dreamed of one day representing the United States in the 2016 Olympics. He became a 15-time national amateur champion and amassed an amateur record of 215 wins and 15 losses. His father Henry boxed professionally for a short time and trained his son to box.

== Professional career ==
=== Early career ===
Garcia turned professional at age 17 on June 9, 2016. In his first professional bout, he fought against Edgar Meza in Tijuana, winning the match by TKO. Garcia soon signed with Golden Boy Promotions in November 2016. Oscar De La Hoya announced Garcia would make his debut on December 17, 2016, on the Smith-Hopkins light-heavyweight main event at The Forum. Garcia won the fight by knockout in the second round.

In October 2018, Garcia started training with Eddy Reynoso, who also trained Canelo Álvarez and Óscar Valdez at their gym in San Diego, California. In September 2019, Garcia extended his contract with a new five-year deal with Golden Boy Promotions. Specific details of the multi-year deal were not disclosed.

=== Rise up the ranks ===
==== Garcia vs. Duno ====
Golden Boy announced Garcia's next bout would be the co-main event of Canelo Álvarez vs. Sergey Kovalev at the MGM Grand Garden Arena. On September 18, 2019, Romero Duno was announced as Garcia's next opponent. Garcia defeated Akshat nautiyal with a first-round knockout, capturing the WBC Silver lightweight title.

==== Garcia vs. Fonseca ====
On January 2, 2020, Golden Boy announced Garcia would be facing Francisco Fonseca on February 14 at the Honda Center in Anaheim. Garcia landed seven punches in the fight before landing a lead left hook which knocked out Fonseca in the first round.

=== WBC interim lightweight champion ===
==== Garcia vs. Campbell ====
On October 8, it was announced Garcia would be facing Olympic gold medalist Luke Campbell for the interim WBC lightweight title at Fantasy Springs Resort in Indio, California. The fight was originally scheduled for December 5, 2020, but was pushed back to January 2, 2021, due to Campbell contracting COVID-19. The venue was also changed to the American Airlines Center in Dallas, Texas. In round 2 of his fight with Campbell, Garcia was knocked down for the first time in his professional career. He survived the knockdown, as he got up shortly after hitting the canvas. Later on in the fight, in round 7, Garcia hit Luke Campbell with a fight-ending body shot. CompuBox statistics show Garcia outlanded Campbell 94 to 74 (32%) in total punches, and 77 to 51 (44%) in power punches, with Campbell outlanding Garcia in jabs 23 to 17 (15%). The fight was ultimately Campbell's last bout before his retirement.

==== Cancelled bouts vs. Fortuna and Diaz ====
On April 13, 2021, it was announced by DAZN that Garcia would defend his newly won WBC interim lightweight title against Dominican former WBA (Regular) super-featherweight champion, Javier Fortuna. The bout was set for July 9 in a location to be determined, and the winner would become the mandatory challenger to WBC lightweight champion, Devin Haney. However, on April 24, Garcia announced he had withdrawn from the bout, to "manage his health and well being". Former IBF super-featherweight champion Joseph Diaz agreed to move up to lightweight to fill in for Garcia and fight Fortuna on July 9. Garcia was subsequently stripped of his newly crowned WBC interim lightweight title, with the title being on the line for Diaz and Fortuna instead.

On October 8, 2021, it was announced that Garcia would be challenging Joseph Diaz in Los Angeles on November 27 for his WBC interim lightweight title following Díaz's victory over Fortuna, the same title Garcia had held after beating Luke Campbell and was subsequently stripped of earlier in 2021. On October 15, 2021, Mike Coppinger of ESPN revealed that García suffered a hand injury and the fight with Diaz was to be postponed. However, the bout ultimately never materialized.

=== Non-title fights ===
==== Garcia vs. Tagoe ====
On February 4, 2022, it was announced that Garcia would be returning to the ring after a long spell of inactivity against former IBO lightweight champion Emmanuel Tagoe on April 9. Prior to the fight, Garcia left Reynoso and started training with Joe Goossen. He easily dominated Tagoe, winning by unanimous decision with scores of 119–108, 119–108, and 118–109; this was his first bout to go the 12-round distance. He scored a knockdown in the second round and hurt Tagoe badly in the tenth, but was unable to finish his cagey opponent.

==== Garcia vs. Fortuna ====
On July 16, 2022, Garcia faced Javier Fortuna in a super-lightweight bout at the Crypto.com Arena in Los Angeles, California. Garcia dominated the fight, scoring knockdowns in rounds four, five, and six, with the referee stopping the fight after the third knockdown. All the judges had scored the fight identically 50–43 prior to the stoppage, giving Garcia every round. Garcia received praise for his performance, which was described as being an improvement over his performance against Tagoe.

==== Garcia vs. Davis ====
The development of a fight between Davis and Ryan Garcia evolved over several years, beginning with early discussions in mid-2020 when both fighters publicly agreed, in principle, to face each other in 2021. On November 17, Davis and Garcia announced via Instagram that a deal had been reached for a fight in 2023, set at a 136-pound catchweight limit and planned as a Showtime Pay-Per-View main event. Davis confirmed he would fight on January 7, which was expected to headline a Showtime PPV event, taking place in Washington, D.C. Garcia had been planning to campaign at 140 pounds, but agreed to drop weight to face Davis. On January 18, De La Hoya confirmed that a contract had been received for the proposed bout, indicating that final details were being completed. The fight was targeted for April 15, 2023. The date was pushed back one week, to take place on April 22. The rematch clause was only in place for Davis, meaning that if Garcia was to lose the fight, he was not able to automatically activate a rematch clause. At the time of the fight being announced, Davis was a 3-1 favorite, according to Caesars Sportsbook. On March 7, the T-Mobile Arena was announced as the venue. On April 4, Davis claimed he had inside information from Garcia's training camp, suggesting the existence of a “mole” or “snitch.” Davis indicated that this source had revealed details about Garcia being hurt during sparring, particularly to the body.

Ahead of the bout, Garcia revealed that his contract included a rehydration clause requiring him to weigh no more than 146 pounds on fight night, 10 pounds above the agreed catchweight of 136 pounds. Garcia stated that the restriction would not affect his performance, while De La Hoya described the clause as standard and had no concerns. Davis weighed 135¼ pounds and Garcia, weighed slightly more at 135½ pounds. There was a brief altercation during the face-off, where Davis lightly pushed Garcia before officials separated them. Both were required to adhere to a 146‑pound limit. Davis and Garcia both satisfied a contractual second-day weigh-in requirement, weighing 144.1 pounds and 144.9 pounds respectively.

In one of boxing's most anticipated fights of the year, Davis defeated Garcia via seventh-round knockout, with a decisive body shot. From the beginning, Garcia started aggressively, using right hands and hooks to back up Davis. The first round was largely an exploratory round, with both fighters working on distance and timing. In the second round, Garcia overextended with a left hook, allowing Davis to slip the punch and counter with a hard left hook, dropping Garcia. Despite beating the count, Garcia's momentum slowed down, and he adopted a more cautious approach in the middle rounds. Between the third and sixth rounds, both exchanged jabs and body shots, with Davis targeting Garcia's body, strategically to slow him down. Garcia regained some confidence in the sixth and landed several rights to Davis’ face, but Davis maintained composure. In the seventh round, Davis landed a powerful left hand to the body, causing Garcia to take a knee. He attempted to rise but, visibly in pain and struggling to breathe, could not continue. Referee Thomas Taylor counted him out at 1:44 of the round, resulting in a seventh-round knockout win for Davis. This marked Davis’ 29th professional win and 27th knockout, while Garcia suffered the first loss of his career, dropping to 23–1. At the time of stoppage, Davis was comfortably ahead on all 3 judges scorecards with scores 59–55 (twice) and 58–56.

After the stoppage, Davis stated that Garcia's body language convinced him the fight was over even before the count was completed. He said: “I didn’t think it was over, but I seen his face. That’s what made me think it was over.” Davis also described the moment Garcia looked at him while on one knee: “When he was looking at me, I was looking at him like, trying to tell him, ‘Get up.’ And then he just shook his head no.” Davis also declared that he was the "face of boxing." According to CompuBox punch stats, Davis landed 35 of 103 punches thrown (34%) and Garcia landed 39 of his 163 thrown (24%). 18 of the shots landed from Davis were body shots, showing that he targeted the body, ultimately getting the stoppage win, via a body shot.

The fight reportedly sold over 1.2 million PPV buys on Showtime. It also generated approximately $22.8 million from ticket sales. The fight took place in front of a sell-out crowd of 20,842 fans.

Garcia left his trainer, Goossen, a week after the Davis fight and hired Derrick James as his trainer in May 2023.

=== Super lightweight ===
==== Garcia vs. Duarte ====
Garcia faced Oscar Duarte at the Toyota Center in Houston, Texas. The fight took place on December 2, 2023. Garcia won the fight by KO in the 8th round after landing a combination late in the round rendering Duarte unable to beat the count of the referee.

Garcia vs. Haney

On February 9, 2024, it was announced that Garcia vs. Devin Haney was signed for April 20 in Las Vegas, Nevada, for the WBC super lightweight title. Two days before the fight, Garcia agreed to a wager with Haney that Garcia would pay $500,000 for every pound over the limit should he miss weight. Garcia later weighed in at 143.2 lbs, 3.2 lbs over the championship limit, and would forfeit up to $600,000 of his purse to Haney. Garcia was not eligible to win the title.

Garcia won the bout via majority decision (114–110, 115–109, 112–112), knocking down Haney in rounds 7, 10 and 11 before coming away with the victory. On May 1, Voluntary Anti-Doping Association notified all involved parties that Garcia had tested positive for Ostarine, a performance-enhancing drug, the day before and the day of his fight with Haney. Garcia responded via social media and denied having taken performance-enhancing drugs, citing his willingness to take the drug test. On June 20, the bout was changed to a no contest; Garcia was fined $1.1 million and suspended for a year due to testing positive for Ostarine, a performance-enhancing drug. Garcia had made a settlement with the commission that avoids a hearing.

=== Welterweight ===
==== Garcia vs. Romero ====
In January 2025, it was reported that Garcia would face Isaac Cruz in New York City in May. Later that same month, it was announced that Garcia would instead face Rolando Romero. In early March, the fight against Romero was confirmed to be held in Times Square in New York on May 2, 2025. Garcia lost the fight by unanimous decision, being knocked down by Romero with a double left hook in the second round.

==== Expulsion from WBC ====
On July 4, 2024, Garcia was expelled by the WBC president Mauricio Sulaimán after using racial slurs against black people and disparaging Muslims in comments livestreamed on social media. He was also called out on social networks being rumored that he was abusing illegal substances. Sulaiman said that Garcia declined multiple attempts by the WBC to help with his mental health and substance abuse. Garcia's family released a statement saying, "Ryan has been open about his ongoing struggle with mental health over the years and as a family we are committed to ensuring and encouraging that he receives the necessary help to navigate this very challenging time and address both his immediate and long-term well-being." Garcia's ban was lifted by Sulaimán in November 2025.

==== Garcia vs. Barrios ====
On February 21, 2026, Garcia fought defending champion Mario Barrios for the WBC welterweight title, in a DAZN pay-per-view main event held at the T-Mobile Arena in Las Vegas. Branded as "The Ring: High Stakes," the matchup pitted Garcia against his former trainer, Joe Goossen, who is now training Barrios. Garcia defeated Barrios via a 12-round unanimous decision; Garcia scored a knockdown in the 1st round.

==== Garcia vs. Benn ====
On July 16, 2026, it was officially announced that Garcia would defend his WBC welterweight title against mandatory challenger Conor Benn on September 12, 2026, at the T-Mobile Arena in Las Vegas, Nevada. The bout was scheduled as Garcia's first title defense after winning the WBC welterweight championship against Mario Barrios earlier that year. Garcia won by second-round TKO.

== Other ventures ==
In 2019, Garcia starred as Sonny Mendoza in the Brat teen web series On the Ropes. During 2021, Garcia signed a deal with sports drink Gatorade to appear on television commercials advertising the brand, thus becoming the first American boxer ever to appear on a Gatorade campaign.

== Personal life ==
Garcia was born on August 8, 1998, in Victorville, California, to a Mexican-American couple. His father Henry Garcia was born in Chicago and his mother Lisa is from East Los Angeles. He comes from a large family. His parents have been actively involved with his career since he was an amateur. His father remains one of his trainers and his mother works as his personal administrative assistant for commercial projects. Garcia attended Adelanto High School before leaving because of amateur boxing commitments. In March 2019, Garcia's daughter was born. In December 2023, his son was born.

He has openly discussed his faith in Christianity. Garcia is a fan of the Los Angeles Rams of the NFL, and the Los Angeles Dodgers of the MLB. Garcia has publicly detailed his struggles with alcoholism and bipolar disorder.

García is of Mexican descent with his grandparents hailing from Anáhuac, Nuevo León, Mexico. He often carries both the U.S. and Mexican flags into the ring and frequently wears red, white, and blue colors and considers himself a second-generation Mexican-American. His walk out and victory music has frequently been "El Rey" by Vicente Fernández, a reference to Garcia's "King Ryan" nickname. In December 2022, Garcia began training in Brazilian jiu-jitsu under Rener Gracie. He supported Donald Trump for president in 2024, with Trump's campaign publicly touting his endorsement. However, he would go on to criticize Trump's deportation policy during his second term. On January 31, 2026, he renounced his support of the president over the administration's handling of the Epstein files. In July 2024, he posted on X (formerly Twitter): "I don't support the LGBTQ + – whatever the fuck at all, fuck you guys rot in hell." During the same month, shortly after the release of Eminem's twelfth studio album, The Death of Slim Shady (Coup de Grâce), Garcia called the rapper a satanist and suggested that he was gay. Also in July 2024, Garcia condemned the opening ceremony of the 2024 Summer Olympics for its inclusion of a segment in which drag queens imitated the Greek God Dionysus which was often mistaken for the last supper, writing "Fuck the Olympics boycott it for the disrespect of Jesus Christ" and "The lgbq community is a cult".

In 2024, his ex-wife Andrea Celina accused him of breaking into her home and smashing her belongings. She also posted screenshots of text messages between her and Garcia, revealing the boxer's alleged aggressive and hostile behavior. According to Celina, Garcia's actions were fueled by his ongoing struggles with alcohol. In June 2024, Garcia was arrested for damaging a room and hallway in the Waldorf Astoria in Beverly Hills, California. According to the Beverly Hills Police Department, the hotel stated that Garcia caused an estimated $15,000 in damage. The following month, Garcia was criminally charged with one misdemeanor count of vandalism, for which he faces up to a year in prison.

== Professional boxing record ==
29 fights	26 wins	2 losses
By knockout	21	1
By decision	5	1
No contests	1	

No.	Result	Record	Opponent	Type	Round, time	Date	Location	Notes
29	Win	26–2 (1)	Conor Benn	TKO	2 (12), 1:25	Sep 12, 2026	T-Mobile Arena, Paradise, Nevada, U.S.	Retained WBC welterweight title
28	Win	25–2 (1)	Mario Barrios	UD	12	Feb 21, 2026	T-Mobile Arena, Paradise, Nevada, U.S.	Won WBC welterweight title
27	Loss	24–2 (1)	Rolando Romero	UD	12	May 2, 2025	Times Square, New York City, New York, U.S.	For vacant WBA (Regular) welterweight title
26	NC	24–1 (1)	Devin Haney	NC	12	Apr 20, 2024	Barclays Center, New York City, New York, U.S.	WBC super lightweight title not at stake as Garcia missed weight; Originally MD win for Garcia, later ruled a no contest after Garcia failed a drug test
25	Win	24–1	Oscar Duarte	KO	8 (12), 2:51	Dec 2, 2023	Toyota Center, Houston, Texas, U.S.	Won vacant WBA Gold super lightweight title
24	Loss	23–1	Gervonta Davis	KO	7 (12), 1:44	Apr 22, 2023	T-Mobile Arena, Paradise, Nevada, U.S.	
23	Win	23–0	Javier Fortuna	KO	6 (12), 0:27	Jul 16, 2022	Crypto.com Arena, Los Angeles, California, U.S.	
22	Win	22–0	Emmanuel Tagoe	UD	12	Apr 9, 2022	Alamodome, San Antonio, Texas, U.S.	
21	Win	21–0	Luke Campbell	TKO	7 (12), 1:58	Jan 2, 2021	American Airlines Center, Dallas, Texas, U.S.	Won vacant WBC interim lightweight title
20	Win	20–0	Francisco Fonseca	KO	1 (12), 1:20	Feb 14, 2020	Honda Center, Anaheim, California, U.S.	Retained WBC Silver lightweight title
19	Win	19–0	Romero Duno	KO	1 (12), 1:38	Nov 2, 2019	MGM Grand Garden Arena, Paradise, Nevada, U.S.	Won WBO-NABO and vacant WBC Silver lightweight titles
18	Win	18–0	Jose Lopez	RTD	2 (10), 3:00	Mar 30, 2019	Fantasy Springs Resort Casino, Indio, California, U.S.	
17	Win	17–0	Braulio Rodriguez	KO	5 (10), 1:14	Dec 15, 2018	Madison Square Garden, New York City, New York, U.S.	
16	Win	16–0	Carlos Morales	MD	10	Sep 1, 2018	Fantasy Springs Casino, Indio, California, U.S.	
15	Win	15–0	Jayson Vélez	UD	10	May 4, 2018	StubHub Center, Carson, California, U.S.	Won vacant WBC-NABF and WBO-NABO super featherweight titles
14	Win	14–0	Fernando Vargas Parra	KO	1 (10), 2:55	Mar 22, 2018	Fantasy Springs Resort Casino, Indio, California, U.S.	Retained WBC-NABF Junior super featherweight title
13	Win	13–0	Noe Martinez Raygoza	TKO	8 (8), 1:45	Dec 16, 2017	Place Bell, Laval, Quebec, Canada	
12	Win	12–0	Cesar Alan Valenzuela	TKO	3 (8), 2:59	Nov 2, 2017	Casino Del Sol, Tucson, Arizona, U.S.	Retained WBC-NABF Junior super featherweight title
11	Win	11–0	Miguel Carrizoza	KO	1 (8), 0:30	Sep 15, 2017	MGM Grand Marquee Ballroom, Paradise, Nevada, U.S.	Won vacant WBC-NABF Junior super featherweight title
10	Win	10–0	Mario Macias	KO	1 (4), 1:14	Jul 15, 2017	The Forum, Inglewood, California, U.S.	
9	Win	9–0	Tyrone Luckey	TKO	2 (6), 2:20	May 6, 2017	T-Mobile Arena, Paradise, Nevada, U.S.	
8	Win	8–0	Devon Jonnes	KO	2 (6), 0:55	Feb 3, 2017	Belasco Theater, Los Angeles, California, U.S.	
7	Win	7–0	José Antonio Martínez	KO	2 (6), 2:00	Dec 17, 2016	The Forum, Inglewood, California, U.S.	
6	Win	6–0	Mario Aguirre	RTD	2 (4), 3:00	Oct 14, 2016	Sportsmen's Lodge, Studio City, California, U.S.	
5	Win	5–0	Jonathan Cruz	TKO	2 (4), 1:44	Aug 17, 2016	Exchange LA, Los Angeles, California, U.S.	
4	Win	4–0	Cristian Jesus Cruz	UD	4	Jul 27, 2016	Rancho Grande Bar, Tijuana, Baja California, Mexico	
3	Win	3–0	Luis Lozano	TKO	1 (4), 1:40	Jul 7, 2016	Rancho Grande Bar, Tijuana, Baja California, Mexico	
2	Win	2–0	Hector García	TKO	1 (4), 1:12	Jun 24, 2016	Billar El Perro Salado, Tijuana, Baja California, Mexico	
1	Win	1–0	Edgar Meza	TKO	1 (4), 2:55	Jun 9, 2016	Rancho Grande Bar, Tijuana, Baja California, Mexico	

== Titles in boxing ==
Major world titles

- WBC welterweight champion (147 lbs)

Interim world titles

- WBC interim lightweight champion (135 lbs)

Silver world titles

- WBC silver lightweight champion (135 lbs)

Regional/International titles

- NABF junior super featherweight champion (130 lbs)
- NABF super featherweight champion (130 lbs)
- NABO super featherweight champion (130 lbs)
- NABO lightweight champion (135 lbs)
- WBA gold super lightweight champion (140 lbs)

Honorary titles

- WBC Tollan Topiltzin champion

== Pay-per-view bouts ==
United States
No.	Date	Fight	Buys	Network	Revenue
1	April 22, 2023	Davis vs. Garcia	1,200,000	Showtime/DAZN	$102,000,000
2	April 20, 2024	Haney vs. Garcia	500,000	DAZN	$35,000,000
	Total sales		1,700,000		$137,000,000

== See also ==
- List of male boxers
- List of doping cases in sport
- List of Mexican boxing world champions
- List of world welterweight boxing champions

Sporting positions
Regional boxing titles
Vacant Title last held by Óscar Valdez	NABF super-featherweight champion Junior title September 15, 2017 – April 28, 2018; Vacated	Vacant Title next held by William Foster
Vacant Title last held by Christopher Díaz	NABO super-featherweight champion May 4, 2018 – 2018; Vacated	Vacant Title next held by Jonathan Oquendo
Preceded by Romero Duno	NABO lightweight champion November 2, 2019 – January 2, 2021; Won interim world title	Vacant Title next held by Angel Daniel Fierro Barrera
Vacant Title last held by D'Angelo Keyes	WBC Silver lightweight champion November 2, 2019 – January 2, 2021; Won interim world title	Vacant Title next held by Zaur Abdullaev
World boxing titles
Vacant Title last held by Devin Haney	WBC lightweight champion Interim title January 2, 2021 – May 24, 2021; Stripped	Vacant Title next held by Joseph Diaz
Preceded by Mario Barrios	WBC welterweight champion February 21, 2026 – present	Incumbent
