= 2017 AIBA World Boxing Championships – Light heavyweight =

Boxing competitions

Light heavyweight at the 2017 AIBA World Boxing Championships
- Venue: Alsterdorfer Sporthalle
- Location: Hamburg, Germany
- Dates: 26 August–2 September
- Competitors: 24 from 24 nations

Medalists
gold medal	Julio César La Cruz	Cuba
silver medal	Joe Ward	Ireland
bronze medal	Carlos Andrés Mina	Ecuador
bronze medal	Bektemir Melikuziev	Uzbekistan

The Light heavyweight competition at the 2017 AIBA World Boxing Championships was held from 26 August to 2 September 2017.

== Draw ==
=== Final ===
Final
2 September
(Cuba) Julio César La Cruz	5
(Republic of Ireland) Joe Ward	0

=== Top half ===
First round
26 August
(Venezuela) Albert Ramírez	0
(Mexico) Rogelio Romero	5
26 August
(Angola) Menayame Mbimbi
(England) Thomas Hart	w/o
26 August
(Tajikistan) Shabbos Negmatulloev	4
(Turkmenistan) Nurýagdy Nurýagdyýew	1
26 August
(Croatia) Damir Plantić	5
(China) Huang Jiabin	0

Second round
28 August
(Cuba) Julio César La Cruz	5
(Mexico) Rogelio Romero	0
28 August
(England) Thomas Hart	0
(Germany) Ibragim Bazuev	3
28 August
(Brazil) Michel de Souza	1
(Tajikistan) Shabbos Negmatulloev	4
28 August
(Croatia) Damir Plantić	1
(Ecuador) Carlos Andrés Mina	4

Quarterfinals
29 August
(Cuba) Julio César La Cruz	5
(Germany) Ibragim Bazuev	0
29 August
(Tajikistan) Shabbos Negmatulloev	0
(Ecuador) Carlos Andrés Mina	5

Semifinals
1 September
(Cuba) Julio César La Cruz	5
(Ecuador) Carlos Andrés Mina	0

=== Bottom half ===
First round
26 August
(Georgia (country)) Iago Kiziria	5
(Scotland) Sean Lazzerini	0
26 August
(Zambia) Mbachi Kaonga	0
(Italy) Valentino Manfredonia	5
26 August
(Australia) Clay Waterman	4
(Pakistan) Awais Khan	1
26 August
(Russia) Muslim Gadzhimagomedov	5
(Colombia) Jeysson Monroy	0

Second round
28 August
(Republic of Ireland) Joe Ward	5
(Georgia (country)) Iago Kiziria	0
28 August
(Italy) Valentino Manfredonia	1
(Belarus) Mikhail Dauhaliavets	4
28 August
(Kazakhstan) Yerik Alzhanov	5
(Australia) Clay Waterman	0
28 August
(Russia) Muslim Gadzhimagomedov	1
(Uzbekistan) Bektemir Melikuziev	4

Quarterfinals
29 August
(Republic of Ireland) Joe Ward	5
(Belarus) Mikhail Dauhaliavets	0
29 August
(Kazakhstan) Yerik Alzhanov	2
(Uzbekistan) Bektemir Melikuziev	3

Semifinals
1 September
(Republic of Ireland) Joe Ward	3
(Uzbekistan) Bektemir Melikuziev	2
