= Canelo Álvarez vs. Sergey Kovalev =

2019 professional boxing match

- Date: November 2, 2019
- Venue: MGM Grand Garden Arena; Paradise, Nevada, United States
- Title(s) on the line: WBO light heavyweight title

Tale of the tape
Boxer	Sergey Kovalev	Saúl Álvarez
Nickname	Krusher	Canelo ("Cinnamon")
Hometown	Kopeysk, Chelyabinsk Oblast, Russia	Guadalajara, Jalisco, Mexico
Purse	$3,000,000	$35,000,000
Pre-fight record	34–3–1 (29 KO)	52–1–2 (35 KO)
Age	36 years, 7 months	29 years, 3 months
Height	6 ft 0 in (183 cm)	5 ft 8 in (173 cm)
Weight	175 lb (79 kg)	174 1/2 lb (79 kg)
Style	Orthodox	Orthodox
Recognition	WBO; Light Heavyweight Champion; The Ring/TBRB; No. 2 Ranked Light Heavyweight	WBA (Super), TBRB and The Ring; Middleweight Champion; WBA (Regular) super middleweight champion The Ring; No. 5 Ranked Super Middleweight; TBRB; No. 6 Ranked Super Middleweight; The Ring No. 3 ranked pound-for-pound fighter 2-division world champion^{[*]}

Result
- Álvarez wins via 11th-round KO

Canelo Álvarez vs. Sergey Kovalev was a professional boxing match contested on November 2, 2019, for the WBO light heavyweight championship. The fight took place at the MGM Grand Garden Arena in Paradise, Nevada and Álvarez won by 11th-round knockout.

== Background ==
On July 25, 2019, it became known that Kovalev (34–3–1, 29 KOs) was negotiating a deal to fight Álvarez (51–1–2, 34 KOs) for October 2019, in a fight that would see Álvarez make his light heavyweight debut. There was reports implying the fight with Anthony Yarde, who the WBO ordered Kovalev to fight, would be scrapped if Golden Boy Promotions and Main Events successfully negotiated a deal. Álvarez was ordered by the IBF to defend the title against Sergiy Derevyanchenko. John Skipper, who was DAZN's executive chairman, where Álvarez was tied into a contract, stated the streaming service would only approve Kovalev or a trilogy fight with Gennady Golovkin as Álvarez's next fight. According to Egis Klimas, an agreement was in place for Kovalev to fight Álvarez, if he was to defeat Yarde. On August 8, Álvarez decided to wait until after Kovalev's fight with Yarde to decide his next opponent. Yarde revealed he was approached multiple times for step aside offers. He was first offered less than his purse for the Kovalev fight, then offered the same amount. Yarde joked that these offers needed to be more than double his purse for him to consider stepping aside. During fight week, Kovalev spoke to reporters to explain the reason why he turned down a last minute eight-figure offer from Álvarez was due to the Yarde fight only being three weeks away. Tickets were already on sale and being sold. Also the matter that Kovalev was defending his world title in front his own fans in his hometown, having fought the majority of his career in the United States. Speaking to Steve Bunce, Kovalev said he wanted five more fights and a chance to become undisputed champion.

A few weeks after Kovalev defeated Yarde, the fight between Kovalev and Álvarez was formally announced to take place on November 2, 2019, at the MGM Grand in Las Vegas, exclusively on DAZN. The fight would see Álvarez move up in weigh again in attempt to become a four-division world champion and only the second Mexican to win a world title at light heavyweight. Álvarez was looking to make history. He said, "The second phase of my career is continuing just as we had planned, and that's why we are continuing to make great fights to enter into the history books of boxing. That's also why I've decided to jump two weight classes against one of the most feared champions of recent years. Kovalev is a dangerous puncher, and he's naturally the bigger man, but that's the kind of challenges and risks that I like to face." Kovalev said of the fight, "In order to be the best you have to beat the best. I have always tried to fight the toughest opponents in my division, but many have ducked me throughout my career. Canelo wanted to fight me; to step up to higher weight and challenge for my belt." The ideal location for the fight was the T-Mobile Arena, but was not available due to Vegas Golden Knights having an NHL game on November 2.

According to Eric Gomez of Golden Boy Promotions, completing the deal with Main Events was easy. The hurdles came before that where different parties tried to jeopardise the fight. Kovalev's former trainer John David Jackson stated the only reason Team Canelo picked Kovalev was due to him being the weakest of the champion in the division. At the time, the other champions were Beterbiev, Bivol, and Gvozdyk. He said, "I’m not saying Kovalev can’t beat them because he can punch. At this stage of his career he’s on the decline compared to them.” Álvarez said he picked Kovalev because 'he's the best in his division, he's one of the best [in the sport]'. The event was criticised by UFC boss Dana White for going head-to-head with UFC 244, which was being aired on ESPN+, a rival network.

There was talk amongst the boxing media whether Álvarez would utilise the full 175 pound weight limit or whether he would weigh lighter. During a media call, Álvarez said he planned on weighing at the limit. This was Kovalev's 17th consecutive title fight. Kovalev towered over Álvarez being four full inches taller. At the weigh-in, Álvarez weighed 174½ pounds. At first, Kovalev stepped on the scales at 176 pounds, a pounds above the limit. He then expected to make the weight by removing his necklace, only to weigh 175½ pounds. He removed his clothes to step on the scales a third time, but was still over, this time at 175¼ pounds. He was given an hour by the NSAC to lose the extra weight. Kovalev returned a few minutes and weighing in at the 175 pounds limit. Both boxers had to adhere to the rehydration clause where neither could weigh above 185 pounds on the morning of the fight.

== The fight ==
There was a crowd of 14,490 in attendance, mostly pro-Álvarez. There was over an hour delay before the main event started. DAZN wanted to wait for the UFC 244 main event to finish, to maximise the amount of subscribers to tune into the boxing. MGM Grand were granted permission from ESPN+, the UFC broadcaster, to allow them to show the UFC main event in the arena, whilst the crowd waited. The boxing began at 1:18 a.m. ET.

The fight was competitive throughout up until round 11 where Álvarez knocked out Kovalev to claim his WBO light heavyweight title. Kovalev worked off his jab from the opening round, finding success and winning rounds. Álvarez starting landing more power shots in the second half of the fight, but at the same time, Kovalev's jab was still connecting, frustrating Álvarez. Kovalev had his best round in the eighth pushing Álvarez on the backfoot. In the ninth and tenth rounds, Kovalev had further success out-landing Álvarez 34–22 in punches landed. Everything changed in the eleventh. Álvarez caught Kovalev with a left hook to the head which badly staggered him. He then followed with an accurately placed right hand to the chin, which had Kovalev knocked out against the second rope. Referee Russell Mora didn't start a count and immediately stopped the fight with the official time of the stoppage being 2:15 of round 11.

Kovalev was stopped for just the third time in his career. At the time of the stoppage, Álvarez led 96–94 on two of the judges' scorecards, with the other scorecard even at 95–95. Some within the media had Kovalev ahead, including ESPN's Dan Rafael, who scored it 97–93. Álvarez joined Thomas Hearns, Sugar Ray Leonard, and Mike McCallum as the only former light middleweight champions in history to win a title at light heavyweight.

== CompuBox Stats ==
According to CompuBox, Álvarez landed 133 of 345 punches thrown (39%) while Kovalev landed 115 of 745 thrown (15%). Kovalev threw a career-high 577 jabs, landing only 63 of them.

== Aftermath ==
Speaking after the fight, Álvarez said, "The plan overall was patience, that was basically it -- to have patience. We knew it was going to be five, six rounds, and it was going to take some time for me to get him. I'm new at this weight, new in this division. Much credit to him. He's a great fighter, but we stuck to our game plan. It was delayed a little bit, but overall, it was successful." Kovalev was gracious in defeat, "I'll be back. I'll be back much stronger. I know that I can be a unified champion. Nobody wants to fight me in my division. This guy [Álvarez] is more fresh. He came into my division more fresh. He has more stamina, but it's OK. It's a good experience for me." Kovalev went to hospital for precautionary purposes.

Álvarez's purse for the fight as part of his DAZN deal was $35 million. Kovalev received a base purse of $3 million, however would earn more from the $12 million his promoter received from Golden Boy Promotions. Álvarez admitted it would be difficult to lose weight to safely get back down to 160 pounds and was keeping his options open.

Immediately after the bout, many fight fans started asking Kovalev on social media about why he allegedly took a dive. The former champion answered via several videos on his Instagram page,:

"It was impossible for me to win that fight because of all the demands and contract clauses I have signed, and my physical conditioning problems. But financially it was very interesting for me... so, yeah, I accepted the fight I was not supposed to win."

Álvarez responded by calling Kovalev a "bad loser".

== Reception ==
The event generated $8.173 million live gate from the 10,005 tickets sold. 1,643 tickets were issued as complimentary. The total was still less than what was announced on the night.

== Fight card ==
Confirmed bouts:

Weight class		vs.		Type	Round	Time	Notes
Light heavyweight	(Mexico) Canelo Álvarez	def.	(Russia) Sergey Kovalev (c)	KO	11/12	2:15	^{Note 1}
Lightweight	(United States) Ryan Garcia	def.	(Philippines) Romero Duno	KO	1/12	1:38	^{Note 2}
Flyweight	(United States) Seniesa Estrada	def.	(United States) Marlen Esparza	TD	9/10	2:00	^{Note 3}
Welterweight	(United States) Blair Cobbs	def.	(Mexico) Carlos Ortiz	RTD	6/10	3:00	^{Note 4}
Preliminary Card
Super welterweight	(United States) Evan Holyfield	def.	(United States) Nick Winstead	KO	1/4	0:16	^{Note 5}
Super welterweight	(Russia) Bakhram Murtazaliev	def.	(Spain) Jorge Fortea	UD	12
Super welterweight	(United States) Tristan Kalkreuth	def.	(United States) Twon Smith	UD	4
Light heavyweight	(Uzbekistan) Bektemir Melikuziev	def.	(United States) Clay Collard	TKO	4/8	1:11
Middleweight	(Kazakhstan) Meirim Nursultanov	def.	(Mexico) Cristian Olivas	UD	10

^Note 1 For WBO light heavyweight title
^Note 2 For vacant WBC Silver lightweight title
^Note 3 For WBA female flyweight title
^Note 4 For vacant NABF welterweight title
^Note 5 Holyfield's professional debut

== Broadcasting ==
The fight was streamed live on DAZN in the United States and nine other countries, televised on both FTA Azteca 7 in Mexico and Channel One in Russia.

Country	Broadcaster			
Country	Free-to-air	Cable/Pay television	PPV	Stream
Australia	—N/a		Main Event	—N/a
Austria	—N/a			DAZN
Brazil	—N/a			DAZN
Brunei	—N/a		Astro Box Office	Astro GO
Canada	—N/a			DAZN
China	CCTV-5		—N/a	CNTV Ai Bugu
Denmark	—N/a	TV3 Sport	—N/a	Viaplay
Finland	—N/a	TV3 Sport	—N/a	Viasat Urheilu
France	—N/a	beIN Sports	—N/a	beIN Sports Connect
Germany	—N/a			DAZN
Indonesia	Mola TV		—N/a	Mola TV On Demand
Ireland	—N/a	Sky Sports	—N/a	Sky Go
Italy	—N/a			DAZN
Japan	—N/a			DAZN
Kazakhstan	QAZTRK	—N/a		QAZTRK
Latin America Central: Costa Rica; Dominican Republic; El Salvador; Guatemala; Honduras; Nicaragua; Panama; South: Argentina; Chile; Colombia; Ecuador; Peru; Uruguay; Venezuela		Space (PAN and South)	—N/a	Space GO (PAN and South)
Mexico	Azteca 7	Space (PAN and South)	—N/a	Space GO (PAN and South)
Mexico	Las Estrellas	TUDN	—N/a	TUDN
Malaysia	—N/a		Astro Box Office	Astro GO
MENA: Algeria; Chad; Comoros; Djibouti; Iran; Iraq; Jordan; Kuwait; Lebanon; Libya; Mauritania; Morocco; Oman; Palestine; Qatar; Saudi Arabia; Somalia; Sudan; Syria; Tunisia; United Arab Emirates; Yemen	—N/a	beIN Sports	—N/a	beIN Sports Connect
New Zealand	—N/a		Sky Arena	—N/a
Norway	—N/a			Viasport
Panama	Telemetro	—N/a		Medcom Go
Philippines	5 (delayed)	—N/a		ESPN5 (delayed)
Philippines	5 (delayed)	—N/a	Cignal TV	
Philippines	5 (delayed)	—N/a	Sky Sports	
Poland	—N/a	Polsat Sport	—N/a	IPLA
Russia	Channel One	—N/a		Channel One
Spain	—N/a			DAZN
Sub-Saharan Africa: Angola; Benin; Botswana; Burkina Faso; Burundi; Cameroon; Cape Verde; Central African Republic; Chad; Comoros; Congo; Djibouti; DR Congo; Equatorial Guinea; Eritrea; Eswatini; Ethiopia; Gabon; Gambia; Ghana; Guinea; Guinea-Bissau; Ivory Coast; Kenya; Lesotho; Liberia; Madagascar; Malawi; Mali; Mauritania; Mauritius; Mozambique; Namibia; Niger; Nigeria; Rwanda; Sao Tome and Principe; Senegal; Seychelles; Sierra Leone; Somalia; South Africa; South Sudan; Sudan; Tanzania; Togo; Uganda; Zambia; Zimbabwe	—N/a	SuperSport	—N/a	DStv Go
Sweden	—N/a			Viasport
Switzerland	—N/a			DAZN
Taiwan	—N/a	Eleven Sports	—N/a	Eleven Sports
Timor-Leste	Mola TV		—N/a	Mola TV On Demand
Turkey	DMAX	—N/a		DMAX
United Kingdom	—N/a	Sky Sports	—N/a	Sky Go
United States	—N/a			DAZN
United States	—N/a			Pluto TV (undercard only)
United States	—N/a			Stadium (undercard only)

== Fight purses ==
According to the Nevada State Athletic Commission, Álvarez earned an official purse of $35 million and Kovalev a $3 million purse. These figures are the final figures they will earn as Canelo has a subscription deal which means no potential PPV revenue.

Guaranteed base purses

- Canelo Álvarez ($35 million) vs. Sergey Kovalev ($3 million)
- Ryan Garcia ($250,000) vs. Romero Duno ($50,000)
- Bakhram Murtazaliev ($55,000) vs. Jorge Fortea ($20,000)
- Seniesa Estrada ($50,000) vs. Marlen Esparza ($50,000)
- Blair Cobbs ($20,000) vs. Carlos Ortiz ($5,000)
- Meiirim Nursultanov ($12,500) vs. Cristian Olivas ($12,000)

== Notes ==
1. Canelo is a 2-division champion because his WBA (Regular) super middleweight title was a secondary title. The universally recognized WBA super middleweight champion during this fight was WBA (Super) champion Callum Smith.

Preceded by vs. Anthony Yarde	Sergey Kovalev's bouts 2 November 2019	Succeeded by vs. Tervel Pulev
Preceded by vs. Daniel Jacobs	Canelo Álvarez's bouts 2 November 2019	Succeeded by vs. Callum Smith
