= Evan Holyfield =

American boxer

Personal information
- Nickname: Yung Holy
- Born: Eleazar Evan Holyfield; October 23, 1997 (age 28) Atlanta, Georgia, U.S.
- Height: 6 ft 2 in (188 cm)
- Weight: Light middleweight
- Parent: Evander Holyfield (father)
- Relative: Elijah Holyfield (brother)

Boxing career
- Reach: 74 1/2 in (189 cm)

Boxing record
- Total fights: 10
- Wins: 9
- Win by KO: 6
- Losses: 1

Eleazar Evan Holyfield (born October 23, 1997) is an American professional boxer. He is the son of former two-division world champion of boxing, Evander Holyfield.

== Background ==
Holyfield was born in Atlanta. He is the middle child of 11 total children that Evander Holyfield has fathered. His younger brother, Elijah Holyfield, is a running back for the Cincinnati Bengals of the National Football League. Holyfield is represented professionally by Athelo Group, a sports agency based out of Connecticut.

== Professional career ==
Holyfield made his professional debut on November 2, 2019, on the undercard of Canelo Álvarez vs. Sergey Kovalev at the MGM Grand Garden Arena in Paradise, Nevada. He scored a technical knockout (TKO) victory against Nick Wenstead at 16 seconds in the first round. He went on a 9-fight win streak, winning five of them inside the distance. He suffered his first defeat on May 14, 2022, via knockout. The defeat came at the Kia Forum in Inglewood at on the Sergey Kovalev vs. Tervel Pulev undercard against journeyman 32 year old Jurmain McDonald. It was a minute into the second round when McDonald landed a right hand to Holyfield's head as he fell face first onto the canvas. To his credit, he got back and tried to argue with the referee, but the fight was over. He was scheduled to return after a 2-year hiatus, at the CountryBox: Where Music Meets Boxing event on July 1, 2025, when he replaced Shannon Briggs.

== Professional boxing record ==
13 fights	12 wins	1 loss
By knockout	8	1
By decision	4	0

No.	Result	Record	Opponent	Type	Rounds	Date	Location	Notes
13	Win	12–1	LaTreveon Grant	KO	1 (6). 2:39	Jul 1, 2025	Texas Troubadour Theatre, Nashville, Tennessee, U.S.	
12	Win	11–1	Juan Meza Moreno	UD	6	Jun 24, 2023	Cow Palace, Daly City, California, U.S.	
11	Win	10–1	Terrance Jarmon	TKO	1 (6). 2:56	Feb 18, 2023	Cow Palace, Daly City, California, U.S.	
10	Loss	9–1	Jurmain McDonald	KO	2 (6), 1:03	May 14, 2022	Kia Forum, Inglewood, California, U.S.	
9	Win	9–0	Chris Rollins	UD	6	Jan 22, 2022	Borgata Casino Hotel, Atlantic City, New Jersey, U.S.	
8	Win	8–0	Charles Stanford	KO	2 (6), 0:30	Oct 23, 2021	State Farm Arena, Atlanta, Georgia, U.S.	
7	Win	7–0	Agustin Cicero	TKO	3 (6), 0:11	Jul 30, 2021	Castleton Banquet & Conference Center, Windham, New Hampshire, U.S.	
6	Win	6–0	Nicholas Compton	UD	4	Apr 10, 2021	Mohegan Sun Casino, Montville, Connecticut, U.S.	
5	Win	5–0	Donnis Reed	TKO	1 (4), 1:53	Dec 12, 2020	Champion Boxing Gym, Jonesboro, Georgia, U.S.	
4	Win	4–0	Dylan Carlson	UD	4	Mar 7, 2020	Toyota Music Factory, Irving, Texas, U.S.	
3	Win	3–0	Travis Nero	TKO	1 (4), 1:22	Feb 8, 2020	Hard Rock Hotel, Daytona Beach, Florida, U.S.	
2	Win	2–0	Henry Mendez	TKO	3 (4), 1:57	Nov 23, 2019	Arabia Shine Center, Houston, Texas, U.S.	
1	Win	1–0	Nick Winstead	TKO	1 (4), 0:16	Nov 2, 2019	MGM Grand Garden Arena, Paradise, Nevada, U.S.	
