= Carlos Andrés Mina =

Ecuadorian boxer

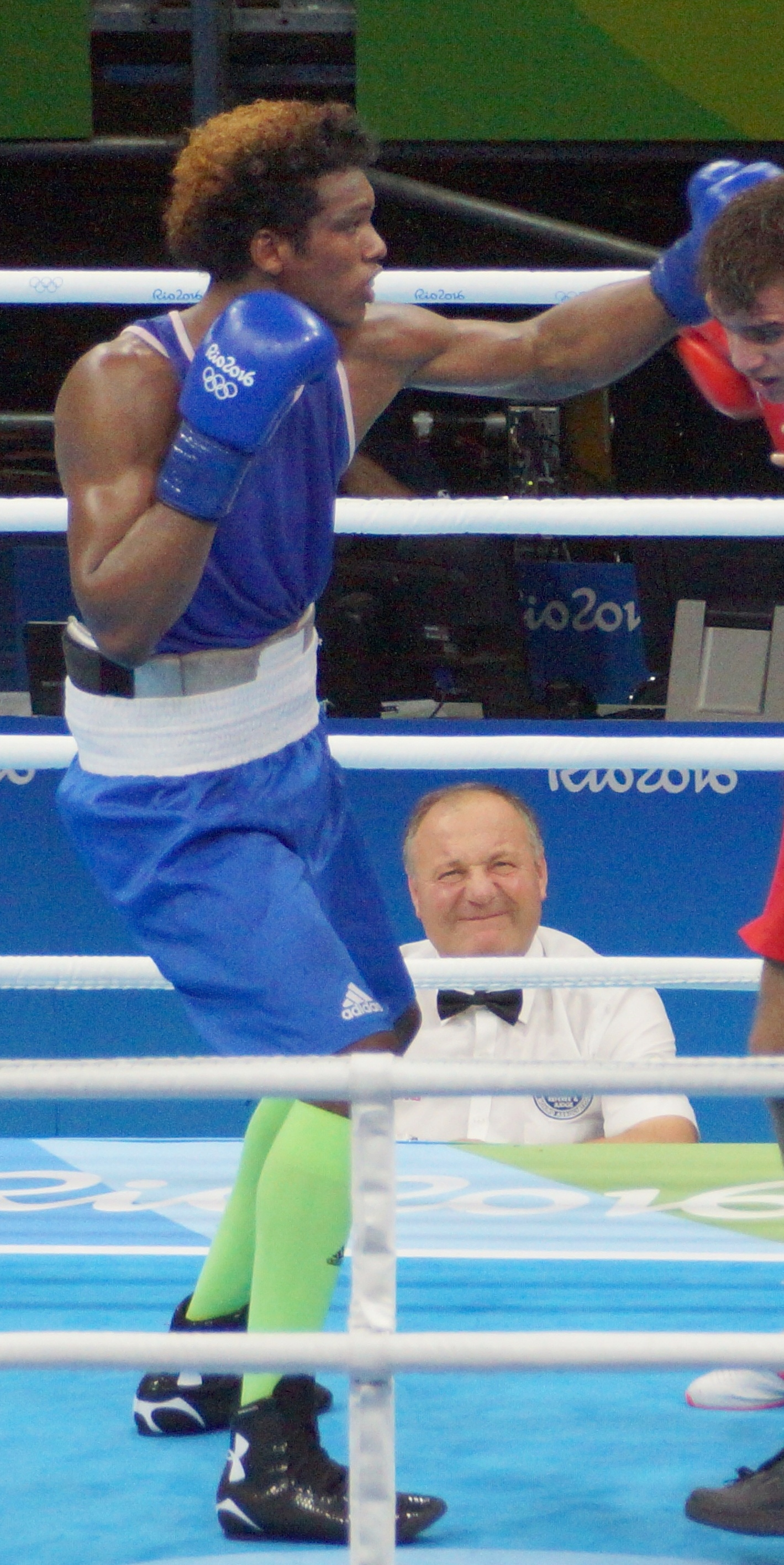
- Mina at the 2016 Olympics

Personal information
- Nationality: Ecuadorian
- Born: 10 October 1992 (age 33)
- Height: 184 cm (6 ft 0 in)

Sport
- Sport: Amateur boxing
- Club: La Tola, Quito
- Coached by: Segundo Chango
Medal record
Men's amateur boxing
Representing Ecuador
World Championships
Bronze medal – third place	2017 Hamburg	Light heavyweight
Pan American Championship
Silver medal – second place	2017 Tegucigalpa	Light heavyweight

Carlos Andrés Mina (born 10 October 1992) is an Ecuadorian amateur boxer. He competed in the light heavyweight division at the 2016 Summer Olympics, but was eliminated in the third bout.

Mina is a composer and singer of rap music. In 2014 he recorded an album La Tinta under an alias Jeanthes Space. He starred in the documentary La Tola Box about his boxing gym La Tola and composed the soundtrack for it. His brother Nixon is an international basketball player, and his cousin Abel is a boxer.
