= Alantez Fox =

American boxer

Personal information
- Nickname: SlyAza
- Born: March 13, 1992 (age 34) Washington, D.C., U.S.
- Height: 6 ft 4 in (193 cm)
- Weight: Light middleweight; Middleweight; Super middleweight

Boxing career
- Reach: 79 in (201 cm)
- Stance: Orthodox

Boxing record
- Total fights: 36
- Wins: 28
- Win by KO: 13
- Losses: 6
- Draws: 1
- No contests: 1

Alantez Fox (born March 13, 1992) is an American professional boxer.

While beginning his professional career as a middleweight, Fox was closely compared to Paul Williams due in large part to both fighters being extremely tall for their weight class.

== Professional career ==
Fox turned professional at the age of 18 instead of attempting to represent the United States in the 2012 Summer Olympics due to the rumors that the protective headgear would not be used, even though the headgear was used in 2012 and not removed until the 2016 Summer Olympics.

Fox's most notable fight occurred in October 2017 on HBO's Boxing After Dark when he fought Demetrius Andrade and lost his undefeated record via a unanimous decision.

Fox is promoted by Lou DiBella's DiBella Entertainment.

== Professional boxing record ==
36 fights	28 wins	6 losses
By knockout	13	3
By decision	14	3
By disqualification	1	0
Draws	1	
No contests	1	

No.	Result	Record	Opponent	Type	Round, time	Date	Location	Notes
36	Loss	28–6–1 (1)	Darius Fulghum	MD	10	Jan 27, 2024	Footprint Center, Phoenix, Arizona, U.S.	For WBA Inter-Continental super middleweight title
35	Loss	28–5–1 (1)	Bektemir Melikuziev	TKO	4 (10)	Oct 7, 2023	The Cosmopolitan of Las Vegas, Chelsea Ballroom, Paradise, Nevada, U.S.	For WBA Inter-Continental super middleweight title
34	Loss	28–4–1 (1)	Erik Bazinyan	MD	10	Feb 2, 2023	Montreal Casino, Montreal, Canada	
33	Loss	28–3–1 (1)	David Morrell Jr.	TKO	4 (12) 2:06	Dec 18, 2021	Minneapolis Armory, Minneapolis, Minnesota, U.S.	For WBA (Regular) super middleweight title
32	Win	28–2–1 (1)	Manny Woods	TKO	7 (8), 1:11	Jun 27, 2021	Minneapolis Armory, Minneapolis, Minnesota U.S.	
31	Win	27–2–1 (1)	Marcos Hernandez	UD	10	Dec 26, 2020	Shrine Exposition Theater, Los Angeles, California, U.S.	
30	NC	26–2–1 (1)	Habib Ahmed	NC	3 (8)	Aug 15, 2020	Mohegan Sun Arena, Montville, Connecticut, U.S.	Fight stopped after Fox cut from accidental head clashes
29	Loss	26–2–1	Liam Williams	TKO	5 (12), 2:59	Dec 21, 2019	Copper Box Arena, London, England	For WBO Inter-Continental middleweight title
28	Win	26–1–1	Bruno Leandro Romay	UD	8	Oct 26, 2019	Cancha Ruben Zayas Montanez, Trujillo Alto, Puerto Rico	
27	Win	25–1–1	Nick Brinson	TKO	6 (8), 2:47	May 18, 2019	St. Elizabeths East Entertainment and Sports Arena, Washington, DC, U.S.	
26	Win	24–1–1	Elvin Ayala	UD	8	Sep 22, 2018	Bowie State University, Bowie, Maryland, U.S.	
25	Loss	23–1–1	Demetrius Andrade	UD	12	Oct 21, 2017	Turning Stone Resort & Casino, Verona, New York, U.S.	
24	Win	23–0–1	Euri Gonzalez	RTD	4 (6), 3:00	Jul 26, 2017	Hotel Jaragua, Santo Domingo, Dominican Republic	
23	Win	22–0–1	Kenneth McNeil	UD	10	Feb 25, 2017	Legacy Arena, Birmingham, Alabama, U.S.	Won vacant WBC-USNBC middleweight title
22	Win	21–0–1	Ronald Montes	TKO	2 (8), 2:59	Sep 30, 2016	UIC Pavilion, Chicago, Illinois, U.S.	
21	Win	20–0–1	Paul Valenzuela, Jr.	RTD	5 (10), 3:00	Jul 21, 2016	Foxwoods Resort Casino, Ledyard, Connecticut, U.S.	
20	Win	19–0–1	Milton Núñez	RTD	4 (8), 3:00	May 8, 2016	Lakeland Events Center, Lakeland, Florida, U.S.	
19	Win	18–0–1	Todd Manuel	RTD	4 (8), 3:00	Nov 13, 2015	Beau Rivage Resort & Casino, Biloxi, Mississippi, U.S.	
18	Win	17–0–1	Eric Mitchell	DQ	5 (8), 0:10	Oct 17, 2015	EagleBank Arena, Fairfax, Virginia, U.S.	
17	Win	16–0–1	Guillermo Valdes	KO	1 (6), 1:28	Jul 18, 2015	Sphinx Club, Washington, DC, U.S.	
16	Win	15–0–1	Franklin Gonzalez	TKO	2 (8), 2:39	Apr 17, 2015	Mohegan Sun Casino, Montville, Connecticut, U.S.	
15	Win	14–0–1	Patrick Day	MD	8	Jan 9, 2015	Morongo Casino, Resort & Spa, Cabazon, California, U.S.	
14	Win	13–0–1	Jonathan Garcia	UD	6	Sep 20, 2014	Resorts Casino, New York City, New York, U.S.	
13	Win	12–0–1	Zain Shah	UD	6	Sep 7, 2013	Rosecroft Raceway, Fort Washington, Maryland, U.S.	
12	Win	11–0–1	Keith Collins	UD	6	Apr 25, 2013	Hyatt Regency Hotel, Tulsa, Oklahoma, U.S.	
11	Win	10–0–1	Greg Hackett	UD	6	Mar 2, 2013	Rosecroft Raceway, Fort Washington, Maryland, U.S.	
10	Win	9–0–1	Julius Kennedy	UD	6	Jan 12, 2013	Rosecroft Raceway, Fort Washington, Maryland, U.S.	
9	Win	8–0–1	Jimmy LeBlanc	TKO	1 (6), 1:12	Dec 8, 2012	Walter E. Washington Convention Center, Washington, DC, U.S.	
8	Draw	7–0–1	Frank Galarza	SD	8	Sep 22, 2012	Resorts World Casino, New York City, New York, U.S.	For vacant USA New York State light middleweight title
7	Win	7–0	Fitzgerald Johnson	UD	4	Feb 17, 2012	Nutley High School, Nutley, New Jersey, U.S.	
6	Win	6–0	Corey Preston	UD	4	Nov 3, 2011	Martins Valley Mansion, Hunt Valley, Maryland, U.S.	
5	Win	5–0	Mike Denby	UD	4	Jul 16, 2011	DC Star Night Club, Washington, DC, U.S.	
4	Win	4–0	Warren Snapp	TKO	3 (4), 0:50	May 13, 2011	Buffalo Bill's Star Arena, Primm, Nevada, U.S.	
3	Win	3–0	Charles White	KO	1 (4), 1:08	Nov 10, 2010	DC Star Night Club, Washington, DC, U.S.	
2	Win	2–0	Dustin Parrish	TKO	1 (4), 1:31	Oct 21, 2010	Martin's Valley Mansion, Cockeysville, Maryland, U.S.	
1	Win	1–0	Kelvin Kibler	UD	4	Jul 31, 2010	Sovereign Bank Baseball Stadium, York, Pennsylvania, U.S.	
