= Nikita Ababiy =

American boxer (born 1998)

Personal information
- Nickname: White Chocolate
- Nationality: American
- Born: October 20, 1998 (age 27) Richmond, Virginia, U.S.
- Height: 6 ft 0 in (183 cm)
- Weight: Middleweight

Boxing career
- Reach: 70 in (178 cm)
- Stance: Orthodox

Boxing record
- Total fights: 14
- Wins: 14
- Win by KO: 8

Nikita Ababiy (born October 20, 1998) is an American professional boxer of Russian descent. As an amateur he was a Jr. Golden Gloves National Champion as well as two-time World Ring Side Champion. Ababiy was also in the USA Youth Team in 2016.

== Professional career ==
Ababiy made his professional debut under Eddie Hearn's Matchroom Boxing USA banner on October 6, 2018, at the Wintrust Arena in Chicago, Illinois. The fight was streamed live, exclusively on DAZN in the U.S. as part of the undercard of Jessie Vargas vs. Thomas Dulorme. Ababiy won the fight via first round knockout (KO). Ababiy's second professional fight was against American welterweight Javier Rodriquez at the Kansas Star Arena in Kansas on November 17, 2018. The bout was stopped in the first round and the referee declared Ababiy the winner by TKO. Ababiy's third professional fight was on the undercard of Dmitry Bivol vs. Joe Smith Jr. against American Cory Dulaney on March 9, 2018. Ababiy got a TKO victory in the first round, achieving his third first-round knockout victory in a row.

In April 2019, Ababiy made his first appearance outside the United States at The O2 Arena in London. He secured a second-round TKO victory over Dimitri Faltin to take his record to 4–0 and make it 4 consecutive knockout victories. Two months later, Ababiy defeated Juan Francisco Lopez Barajas of Mexico with a first-round knockout, in Madison Square Garden, New York City. In July 2019, Ababiy won by unanimous decision against Cuban Yunier Calzada after 6 rounds. In Ababiy's seventh professional fight, on November 5, 2019, he defeated Isiah Seldon via first-round knockout, bringing his knockout total to 6 out of 7 fights. In his eighth professional fight, he won by disqualification against Jonathan Batista on the KSI vs. Logan Paul II undercard after Batista continued to fight after the round ending bell had been sounded. This brought Ababiy's record to 8–0 with 6 first-round victories.

== Professional boxing record ==
14 fights	14 wins	0 losses
By knockout	8	0
By decision	5	0
By disqualification	1	0

No.	Result	Record	Opponent	Type	Round, time	Date	Location	Notes
13	Win	13–0	(Mexico) Jesus Cruz Silva	TKO	1 (6) 3:00	Apr 27, 2024	(United States) Liacouras Center, Philadelphia, Pennsylvania, U.S.	
12	Win	12–0	(United States) Noe Larios Jr	UD	8	Jun 25, 2022	(United States) Tech Port Arena, San Antonio, Texas, U.S.	
11	Win	11–0	(United States) Sanny Duversonne	UD	8	Oct 16, 2021	(United States) Chukchansi Park, Fresno, California, U.S.	
10	Win	10–0	(United States) Brandon Maddox	UD	6	Nov 27, 2020	(United States) Seminole Hard Rock Hotel & Casino, Hollywood, Florida, U.S.	
9	Win	9–0	(United States) Jarvis Williams	UD	6	Aug 15, 2020	(United States) Downtown Tulsa Streets, Tulsa, Oklahoma, U.S.	
8	Win	8–0	(Dominican Republic) Jonathan Batista	DQ	1 (4), 3:00	Nov 9, 2019	(United States) Staples Center, Los Angeles, California, U.S.	Batista disqualified for punching after the bell
7	Win	7–0	(United States) Isiah Seldon	KO	1 (6), 1:45	Oct 5, 2019	(United States) Madison Square Garden, New York City, New York, U.S.	
6	Win	6–0	(Cuba) Yunier Calzada	UD	6	Jul 27, 2019	(United States) College Park Center, Arlington, Texas, U.S.	
5	Win	5–0	(Mexico) Juan Francisco Lopez Barajas	KO	1 (4), 0:41	Jun 8, 2019	(United States) Madison Square Garden, New York City, New York, U.S.	
4	Win	4–0	(Finland) Dimitri Faltin	TKO	2 (4), 0:26	Apr 20, 2019	(United Kingdom) The O2 Arena, London, England	
3	Win	3–0	(United States) Cory Dulaney	TKO	1 (4), 3:00	Mar 9, 2019	(United States) Turning Stone Resort & Casino, Verona, New York, U.S.	
2	Win	2–0	(United States) Javier Rodriguez	TKO	1 (4), 1:48	Nov 17, 2018	(United States) Kansas Star Arena, Mulvane, Kansas, U.S.	
1	Win	1–0	(United States) Jake Henriksen	KO	1 (4), 0:28	Oct 6, 2018	(United States) Wintrust Arena, Chicago, Illinois, U.S.	
