= Bektemir Melikuziev =

Uzbek boxer (born 1996)

Personal information
- Nickname: Bek the Bully
- Nationality: Uzbek
- Born: Bektemir Rozmatjon Ogli Meliqoziyev; 13 April 1996 (age 30) Shoimbek, Uzbekistan
- Height: 5 ft 9 in (175 cm)
- Weight: Super-middleweight

Boxing career
- Reach: 70 1/2 in (179 cm)
- Stance: Southpaw

Boxing record
- Total fights: 17
- Wins: 16
- Win by KO: 10
- Losses: 1
Medal record
Men's amateur boxing
Representing Uzbekistan
Olympic Games
Silver medal – second place	2016 Rio de Janeiro	Middleweight
World Amateur Championships
Silver medal – second place	2015 Doha	Middleweight
Bronze medal – third place	2017 Hamburg	Light-heavyweight
Asian Championships
Gold medal – first place	2015 Bangkok	Middleweight
Gold medal – first place	2017 Tashkent	Light-heavyweight
Youth Olympic Games
Gold medal – first place	2014 Nanjing	Welterweight

Bektemir Rozmatjon Ogli Meliqoziyev (born 13 April 1996) is an Uzbek professional boxer. As an amateur, he won a silver medal at the 2016 Summer Olympics as a middleweight.

== Amateur career ==
=== Olympic result ===
Rio 2016

- Round of 16: Defeated Daniel Lewis (Australia) 3–0
- Quarter-finals: Defeated Vikas Krishan Yadav (India) 3–0
- Semi-final: Defeated Misael Rodríguez (Mexico) 3–0
- Final: Defeated by Arlen López (Cuba) 3–0

=== World Championship results ===
Doha 2015

- Round of 32: Defeated Zaal Kvachatadze (Georgia) KO
- Round of 16: Defeated Christian M'billi (France) 2–1
- Quarter-finals: Defeated Petr Khamukov (Russia) 2–1
- Semi-finals: Defeated Michael O'Reilly (Republic of Ireland) 2–1
- Final: Defeated by Arlen López (Cuba) 2–1

Hamburg 2017

- Round of 16: Defeated Muslim Gadzhimagomedov (Russia) 4–1
- Quarter-finals: Defeated Yerik Alzhanov (Kazakhstan) 3–2
- Semi-final: Defeated by Joe Ward (Republic of Ireland) 3–2

== Professional career ==
On 13 June 2019, Melikuziev made his professional debut against the experienced Argentinian Martin Fidel Rios. Melikuziev won the bout after knocking Rios out with a left hand to the body in the opening round. Melikuziev's second bout as a professional was against Ricardo Adrian Luna Flores on 30 August 2019. Melikuziev secured a first round win after dropping his Mexican opponent on the canvas twice following a series of strong body shots, Melikuziev was declared the winner after Luna Flores was unable to recover from a second time on the canvas.

On 2 November 2019, Melikuziev fought professionally for a third time on the undercard of Canelo Álvarez vs. Sergey Kovalev against Clay Collard. Melikuziev won via fourth-round technical knockout after slowly wearing his opponent down with a number of heavy body shots. Melikuziev was taken the distance for the first time as a professional when he fought Vaughn Alexander on 13 December 2019. Melikuziev won via wide unanimous decision after winning every round on each of the three scorecards.

On 14 February 2020, Melikuziev fought against Oscar Cortes. In the opening round, Melikuziev put his opponent on the canvas with a right hand to the head. Cortes landed few shots throughout the bout and Melikuziev eventually dropped his opponent for a second time in the round with a heavy shot to the body, following the second knock down, referee Edward Hernandez Sr called an end to the fight. Melikuziev's sixth professional fight was against Alan Campa on 30 October 2020. Melikuziev won via knockout in the third round.

Melikuziev had been scheduled to fight former light heavyweight champion Sergey Kovalev on 30 January 2021, but the bout was canceled when Kovalev tested positive for a banned substance. Melikuziev instead fought Morgan Fitch on 13 February 2021 and won via third-round knockout after knocking Fitch down twice in the bout.

On 19 June 2021, Melikuziev fought his toughest opponent yet, American veteran Gabriel Rosado. He dropped Rosado in the first round and looked to be in control of the fight, but Rosado unexpectedly caught Melikuziev in the third round with a powerful overhand right that sent him to the canvas. Melikuziev was unable to recover in time and he suffered a major upset loss, with commentators and analysts opining that the stoppage was a contender for Knockout of the Year.

On April 20, 2024 in Brooklyn, New York, Melikuziev was scheduled to face Pierre Hubert Dibombe. He won the fight via unanimous technical decision, after the fight was stopped in the eighth round due to cut above his left eye.

Melikuziev faced Darius Fulghum in a WBA super-middleweight title eliminator at The Theater at Virgin Hotels in Las Vegas, on May 30, 2025. He won by unanimous decision.

== Professional boxing record ==
18 fights	17 wins	1 loss
By knockout	11	1
By decision	6	0

No.	Result	Record	Opponent	Type	Round, time	Date	Location	Notes
18	Win	17–1	Sena Agbeko	TKO	7 (10), 2:58	21 Feb 2026	T-Mobile Arena, Paradise, Nevada, U.S.	
17	Win	16–1	Darius Fulghum	UD	12	30 May 2025	The Theater at Virgin Hotels, Las Vegas, Nevada, US	
16	Win	15–1	David Stevens	SD	12	2 Nov 2024	The Theater at Virgin Hotels, Las Vegas, Nevada, US	
15	Win	14–1	Pierre Hubert Dibombe	TD	8 (10)	20 Apr 2024	Barclays Center, Brooklyn, New York, U.S.	Retained WBA Inter-Continental super-middleweight title; Unanimous TD: Fight stopped after both fighters suffered a cut on their head caused by an accidental clash of heads
14	Win	13–1	Alantez Fox	TKO	4 (10), 2:44	7 Oct 2023	The Cosmopolitan of Las Vegas, Chelsea Ballroom, Las Vegas, U.S.	Retained WBA Inter-Continental super-middleweight title
13	Win	12–1	Gabriel Rosado	UD	10	22 Apr 2023	T-Mobile Arena, Paradise, Nevada, U.S.	Won vacant WBA Inter-Continental super-middleweight title
12	Win	11–1	Ulises Sierra	KO	3 (10), 2:59	28 Jan 2023	YouTube Theater, Inglewood, California, US	Won vacant WBO Global super-middleweight title
11	Win	10–1	Sladan Janjanin	TKO	3 (8), 2:18	6 Aug 2022	Dickies Arena, Fort Worth, Texas, US	
10	Win	9–1	David Zegarra	KO	2 (10), 0:30	19 Mar 2022	Galen Center, Los Angeles, California, US	
9	Win	8–1	Sergei Ekimov	UD	8	17 Dec 2021	Hotel Renaissance, Tashkent, Uzbekistan	
8	Loss	7–1	Gabriel Rosado	KO	3 (12), 1:21	19 Jun 2021	Don Haskins Center, El Paso, Texas, US	Lost WBA Continental Americas super-middleweight title; For vacant WBO International super-middleweight title
7	Win	7–0	Morgan Fitch	KO	3 (8), 2:08	13 Feb 2021	Fantasy Springs Resort Casino, Indio, California, US	
6	Win	6–0	Alan Campa	KO	3 (10), 0:21	30 Oct 2020	Fantasy Springs Resort Casino, Indio, California, US	Won vacant WBO Inter-Continental super-middleweight title
5	Win	5–0	Oscar Cortes	KO	1 (10), 2:04	14 Feb 2020	Honda Center, Anaheim, California, US	
4	Win	4–0	Vaughn Alexander	UD	10	13 Dec 2019	Fantasy Springs Resort Casino, Indio, California, US	Won vacant WBA Continental Americas super-middleweight title
3	Win	3–0	Clay Collard	TKO	4 (8), 2:22	2 Nov 2019	MGM Grand Garden Arena, Paradise, Nevada, US	
2	Win	2–0	Ricardo Adrian Luna Flores	KO	1 (8), 2:13	30 Aug 2019	Pasadena City Hall, Pasadena, California, US	
1	Win	1–0	Martin Fidel Ríos	KO	1 (6), 1:39	13 Jun 2019	Avalon Hollywood, Los Angeles, California, US	

Sporting positions
Regional boxing titles
New title	WBA Continental Americas super-middleweight title 13 December 2019 – 19 June 2021	Succeeded by Gabriel Rosado
Vacant Title last held by Zach Parker	WBO Inter-Continental super-middleweight title 30 Oct 2020 – 2021	Succeeded by Daniele Scardina
