= Marcelo Cóceres =

Argentine boxer (born 1991)

Personal information
- Nicknames: El Terrible ("The Terrible"); Marcelito
- Born: Marcelo Esteban Cóceres; 27 February 1991 (age 35) Villaguay, Entre Ríos, Argentina
- Height: 5 ft 11 1/2 in (182 cm)
- Weight: Light middleweight; Middleweight; Super middleweight; Light heavyweight

Boxing career
- Reach: 69 in (175 cm)
- Stance: Orthodox

Boxing record
- Total fights: 41
- Wins: 32
- Win by KO: 18
- Losses: 8
- Draws: 1

Marcelo Esteban Cóceres (born 27 February 1991) is an Argentine professional boxer who challenged for the World Boxing Organization (WBO) middleweight title in November 2019.

== Professional career ==
=== Early years ===
==== Debut ====
On 24 February 2012, Cóceres made his professional debut against 8–1 Angel Alberto Panario in San Jorge, Santa Fe Province, Argentina, Cóceres won via second-round TKO.

He would compose a record of 14–0–1 with 8 knockouts before heading for a championship bout.

==== IBF Latino junior middleweight champion ====
On 16 August 2014, Cóceres faced compatriot veteran Sergio Jose Sanders for the vacant IBF Latino junior middleweight strap at San Jorge's Club Atletico in Santa Fe Province, Cóceres won via seventh-round corner retirement.

He would defend the regional crown against lackluster opponents hailing from South American soil before defending his title against regional-challenger Argentine Cesar Humberto Velez where he won via first-round TKO.

==== Cóceres vs. Luján ====
On 22 January 2016, Cóceres was scheduled against three-time world title challenger veteran Sebastián Luján to make way for his most notable title defense yet in a bout held in Firmat, Santa Fe Province, Cóceres won via unanimous decision.

=== Rise up the ranks ===
==== WBC and WBO Latino middleweight champion ====
After Cóceres lost hold of his IBF crown in 2017, on 18 May 2018 he fought for another Latino-labeled title, the vacant WBC Latino middleweight belt against the Chilean National middleweight champion Mirko Manquecoy in Club Social y Deportivo Salud Pública, Villaguay. Cóceres won via stopping Manquecoy in the second round. He again fought for a Latino-labaled championship, now the vacant WBO Latino middleweight belt against Argentine prospect Cristian Zarate on 18 August 2018 in Cutral Có, Neuquén Province, Argentina, he won via UD.

==== Cóceres vs. Peralta ====
On 21 September 2019, Cóceres fought German Ignacio Peralta for the vacant WBA Fedebol middleweight title, Coceres won via UD.

=== Cóceres vs. Saunders ===
At the KSI vs Logan Paul II event on 9 November 2019 in Staples Center, Los Angeles, Cóceres challenged reigning WBO super middleweight champion Billy Joe Saunders after the bout was officially announced on 9 October 2019, this bout marked his first match outside of South American soil and his debut in the super middleweight division. On weigh-in, Cóceres tipped in at 168lbs limit whilst Saunders stood at 167¼lbs, the bout was merely criticized as "thrown in together" in a mad rush by Matchroom promoter Eddie Hearn and "NOT supposed to be competitive affairs." It was reported that Saunders would receive a $750,000 guaranteed purse and Cóceres was to collect a $80,000 purse.

Cóceres gave Saunders, who was a 100-1 favorite, a tough and action-packed fight through the first ten rounds despite the odds and early criticism, but in the eleventh, Saunders knocked Cóceres down three times, prompting referee Ray Corona to wave the fight off 1 minute 59 seconds into the penultimate round. Saunders was not pleased with his performance. Speaking to DAZN's Chris Mannix, "Look, there's no excuse. That performance is not worthy of the Canelos (Canelo Álvarez), the Jacobs (Daniel Jacobs) and the other big names. I came here five days before the fight. I'm not making excuses, but I knew, in my own heart, from round nine I have to get this man out of there... Everything was just off tonight. I won, but you know, I wanted to impress the American crowd. I hope you enjoyed the knockout, because that's the only thing I can give you tonight. So, thank you very much." At the time of stoppage, Saunders was ahead on two of the judges scorecards at 96-94 and the remaining judge had it 96-94 for Cóceres.

=== Facing contenders ===
==== Cóceres vs. Papeschi I ====
On 13 November 2020, Cóceres returned in the ring against regional-challenger Sebastian Horacio Papeschi for the Argentine super middleweight title in Luis Guillon, Buenos Aires, Cóceres won the bout via close UD victory.

==== Cóceres vs. Papeschi II ====
On 23 January 2021, Cóceres and Papeschi had an immediate rematch for the Argentine middleweight title due to how close their contest was, in a bout scheduled for 10 rounds in Polidepotivo Municipal Eva Perón, General Madariaga Partido. Papeschi earned his revenge as he wins via split decision.

==== Cóceres vs. Rosalez ====
On 17 June 2021, Cóceres faced 5–3 Nelson Nicolas Rosalez for the vacant WBA Fedebol super middleweight crown, Cóceres won via second-round TKO.

==== Cóceres vs. Berlanga ====
On 9 October 2021 in the undercards of Tyson Fury vs. Deontay Wilder III event at T-Mobile Arena, Cóceres fought rising star Edgar Berlanga for the vacant WBO-NABO super middleweight strap. Cóceres proved to be a worthy test for Berlanga who sustained a torn left bicep as Cóceres proved to be tough and dropped Berlanga in the ninth round, in which Berlanga stood up from en route to a dominative UD victory.

==== Cóceres vs. Bazinyan ====
On 23 June 2022, Cóceres fought Canadian contender and NABF super middleweight champion Erik Bazinyan for the NABF and vacant NABA super middleweight titles in Montreal, Canada. Cóceres fell short as Bazinyan dominated him in a UD victory.

Cóceres rebounded with a fourth-round TKO victory over experienced Javier Francisco Maciel on 19 August 2022, a bout that took place in the light heavyweight division.

==== Cóceres vs. Nursultanov ====
On 1 October 2022, Cóceres challenged the Kazakh WBO International middleweight champion Meiirim Nursultanov for a scheduled 10-rounds bout in MOSiR Hall, Lublin, Poland, Cóceres lost via unanimous decision with the judges scoring 98–92 and 96–94 twice for the latter.

==== Cóceres vs. Avila ====
On 19 May 2023, Cóceres fought Leonel "Fachín" Avila for the vacant South American light heavyweight title at the Juan Domingo Perón Cultural and Sports Events Center, González Catán, Cóceres prevailed via impressive second-round TKO to win the Continental belt.

==== Cóceres vs. Pacheco ====
On 18 November 2023, Cóceres fought rising contender, WBC-USNBC and WBO International super middleweight champion Diego Pacheco in a bout that headlined an event in YouTube Theater, Inglewood, California. Cóceres gave Pacheco a tough contest but the prospect overpowered Cóceres en route to a memorable ninth-round KO victory.

==== Cóceres vs. Iglesias ====
On 7 March 2024, Cóceres fought the reigning IBO super middleweight champion and knockout-artist Osleys Iglesias In the first round of their bout, Iglesias used his height and reach advantage, utilizing the jab until he lands a jab followed by a left hook to the temple that dropped Cóceres, where Cóceres shockingly lost in the first round as he was counted out.

==== Cóceres vs. Pomerleau ====
On 21 September 2024, Cóceres faced against rising prospect David Pomerleau in Colisée de Laval, Laval, Quebec, Canada. Pomerleau scored a stunning, resounding KO victory as he put Cóceres into a halt 31 seconds into the fifth-round.

== Professional boxing record ==
41 fights	32 wins	8 losses
By knockout	18	4
By decision	14	4
Draws	1	

No.	Result	Record	Opponent	Type	Round, time	Date	Location	Notes
41	Loss	32–8–1	Derek Pomerleau	KO	5 (8), 0:31	21 Sep 2024	Colisée de Laval, Laval, Canada	
40	Loss	32–7–1	Osleys Iglesias	KO	1 (10), 2:07	7 Mar 2024	Montreal Casino, Montreal, Canada	
39	Loss	32–6–1	Diego Pacheco	KO	9 (12), 2:53	28 Nov 2023	YouTube Theater, Inglewood, California, U.S.	For WBC-USNBC and WBO International super middleweight titles
38	Win	32–5–1	Leonel Eduardo Ávila	TKO	2 (10), 2:05	19 May 2023	Centro de Eventos Culturales y Deportivos Juan Domingo Perón, González Catán, Argentina	Won vacant South American light heavyweight title
37	Loss	31–5–1	Meiirim Nursultanov	UD	10	11 Oct 2022	MOSiR Hall, Lublin, Poland	For WBO International middleweight title
36	Win	31–4–1	Javier Francisco Maciel	TKO	4 (10), 1:53	19 Aug 2022	Club Union Carmeña, Carmen de Areco, Argentina	
35	Loss	30–4–1	Erik Bazinyan	UD	10	23 Jun 2022	Montreal Casino, Montreal, Canada	For WBC-NABF and vacant WBA-NABA super middleweight titles
34	Loss	30–3–1	Edgar Berlanga	UD	10	9 Oct 2021	T-Mobile Arena, Paradise, Nevada, U.S.	For vacant WBO-NABO super middleweight title
33	Win	30–2–1	Nelson Nicolás Rosalez	TKO	2 (10), 1:54	17 Jun 2021	Microestadio Municipal, Hurlingham, Argentina	Won vacant WBA Fedebol super middleweight title
32	Loss	29–2–1	Sebastián Horacio Papeschi	SD	10	23 Jan 2021	Polideportivo Municipal Eva Perón, General Madariaga Partido, Argentina	For vacant Argentine middleweight title
31	Win	29–1–1	Sebastián Horacio Papeschi	UD	10	13 Nov 2020	Club Atlético Social y Deportivo - Complejo Guillon-, Buenos Aires, Argentina	Won vacant Argentine super middleweight title
30	Loss	28–1–1	Billy Joe Saunders	KO	11 (12), 1:59	9 Nov 2019	Staples Center, Los Angeles, California, U.S.	For WBO super middleweight title
29	Win	28–0–1	Germán Ignacio Peralta	UD	10	21 Sep 2019	Club Atlético Huracán, Buenos Aires, Argentina	Won vacant WBA Fedebol middleweight title
28	Win	27–0–1	Carmelito de Jesús	TKO	7 (10), 3:00	5 Apr 2019	Club Atlético Huracán, Buenos Aires, Argentina	
27	Win	26–0–1	Basilio Silva	KO	2 (10)	28 Dec 2018	Centro de Educacion Física, Ranchos, Argentina	
26	Win	25–0–1	Dani Eliasquevici	UD	10	6 Oct 2018	Estadio F.A.B., Buenos Aires, Argentina	
25	Win	24–0–1	Criztian Zárate	UD	10	18 Aug 2018	Gimnasio Municipal Enrique Mosconi, Cutral Có, Argentina	Won vacant WBO Latino middleweight title
24	Win	23–0–1	Mirko Manquecoy	TKO	2 (10)	18 May 2018	Club Social y Deportiva Salud Públiva, Villaguay, Argentina	Won vacant WBC Latino middleweight title
23	Win	22–0–1	Abel Nicolás Adriel	TKO	4 (6)	10 Mar 2018	Estadio F.A.B., Buenos Aires, Argentina	
22	Win	21–0–1	Guillermo de Jesús Paz	UD	6	24 Feb 2017	Olímpico Football Club, Villa Gobernador Gálvez, Argentina	
21	Win	20–0–1	Sebastián Luján	UD	10	22 Jan 2016	Club Atlético Argentino, Firmat, Argentina	Retained IBF Latino light middleweight title
20	Win	19–0–1	César Humberto Vélez	TKO	1 (10)	27 Nov 2015	Polideportivo Municipal, Recreo, Argentina	Retained IBF Latino light middleweight title
19	Win	18–0–1	Claudinei Lacerda	UD	10	8 Jul 2015	Sociedad Italiana, Santa Fe, Argentina	Retained IBF Latino light middleweight title
18	Win	17–0–1	Mateo Damián Verón	KO	6 (10)	15 May 2015	Club Atlético San Jorge, Santa Fe, Argentina	Retained IBF Latino light middleweight title
17	Win	16–0–1	Adonisio Francisco Reges	UD	10	10 Oct 2014	Asociación Club Mutual El Tala, San Francisco, Argentina	Retained IBF Latino light middleweight title
16	Win	15–0–1	Sergio José Sanders	RTD	7 (10), 3:00	16 Aug 2014	Club Atlético San Jorge, Santa Fe, Argentina	Won vacant IBF Latino light middleweight title
15	Win	14–0–1	Pablo Martín Roldán	TKO	1 (6), 0:37	19 Jul 2014	Villa La Ñata Sporting Club, Buenos Aires, Argentina	
14	Win	13–0–1	Claudio Roberto Fernández	KO	1 (6)	23 May 2014	Sociedad Italiana, Santa Fe, Argentina	
13	Win	12–0–1	Miguel Carranza	TKO	3 (6)	21 Mar 2014	San Jorge, Santa Fe, Argentina	
12	Win	11–0–1	Maximiliano Gaston Mujica	KO	6 (6), 2:43	22 Feb 2014	Asociación de Fomento, Buenos Aires, Argentina	
11	Win	10–0–1	Juan Alberto Nicolás Cuéllar	UD	6	6 Dec 2013	Club Los Padres Capuchinos, Concórdia, Argentina	
10	Win	9–0–1	Adán Martínez	UD	6	25 Oct 2013	Club Salto Uruguayo, Salto, Uruguay	
9	Win	8–0–1	Bernardino González	UD	6	11 Oct 2013	Asociación Mutual Club El Tala, San Francisco, Argentina	
8	Win	7–0–1	Daniel Alberto Rodríguez	TKO	2 (6)	20 Sep 2013	Club El Expreso, El Trébol, Argentina	
7	Win	6–0–1	Pablo Martín Roldán	TKO	2 (6)	6 Jul 2013	Club Huracán, Villaguay, Argentina	
6	Win	5–0–1	Gustavo Hernán Ríos	UD	4	24 Nov 2012	Club Huracán, Villaguay, Argentina	
5	Win	4–0–1	Claudio Roberto Fernández	UD	4	12 Oct 2012	Club Atlético María Juana, María Juana, Argentina	
4	Win	3–0–1	Roberto Eduardo Adriel	UD	4	5 May 2012	Club Huracán, Villaguay, Argentina	
3	Win	2–0–1	Daniel Alberto Rodríguez	TKO	2 (4)	20 Apr 2012	Sociedad Italiana, Santa Fe, Argentina	
2	Draw	1–0–1	César Hernán Reynoso	SD	4	23 Mar 2012	Club Atlético María Juana, María Juana, Argentina	
1	Win	1–0	Ángel Alberto Panario	TKO	2 (4)	24 Feb 2012	Sociedad Italiana, Santa Fe, Argentina	
