= Romero Duno =

Filipino boxer

Personal information
- Nickname: Ruthless
- Nationality: Filipino
- Born: Romero C Duno; 14 October 1995 (age 30) Cotabato City, Philippines
- Height: 1.70 m (5 ft 7 in)
- Weight: Lightweight

Boxing career

Boxing record
- Total fights: 31
- Wins: 26
- Win by KO: 20
- Losses: 5

Romero Duno (born 14 October 1995) is a Filipino professional boxer. He is the current WBA Asia lightweight champion after defeating Kuldeep Dhanda of India on 9 February 2019.

== Professional career ==
Duno turned professional in 2014 and in 2017 he stopped Christian Gonzalez of USA for the vacant WBC Youth Intercontinental lightweight title. Later after the fight, he was signed by Oscar De La Hoya's Golden Boy Promotions.

== Professional boxing record ==
31 fights	26 wins	5 losses
By knockout	20	4
By decision	6	1

No.	Result	Record	Opponent	Type	Round, time	Date	Location	Notes
31	Loss	26–5	(United States) Cain Sandoval	KO	6 (10), 1:00	2024-08-31	(United States) Chumash Casino, Santa Ynez	
30	Loss	26–4	(Mexico) Antonio Moran	KO	6 (10), 1:25	2024-01-32	(United States) WhiteSands Events Center, Plant City, Florida	
29	Win	26–3	(Italy) Christian Danilo Guido	UD	8	2022-10-21	(United States) Avanti Palms Resort, Orlando, Florida, U.S.	
28	Win	25–3	(Colombia) Yogli Herrera	RTD	4 (8)	2022-07-06	Casino Hollywood Milla de Oro, Medellín, Colombia	
27	Loss	24–3	(United States) Frank Martin	TKO	4 (10)	2022-01-01	(United States) Miami, Florida	
26	Win	24–2	(Colombia) Jonathan Perez	RTD	1 (8)	2021-09-24	(United States) Miami, Florida	
25	Win	23–2	(Paraguay) Ramon Elizer Esperanza	TKO	1 (6)	2021-08-20	(United States) Seminole Hard Rock Hotel and Casino, Hollywood	
24	Win	22–2	(Philippines) Angelito Merin	KO	1 (10)	2020-02-29	General Santos, Philippines	
23	Loss	21–2	(United States) Ryan Garcia	KO	1 (12)	2019-11-02	(United States) MGM Grand, Grand Garden Arena, Las Vegas, Nevada, U.S.	
22	Win	21–1	(United States) Ivan Delgado	RTD	7(10)	2019-09-22	(United States) Dignity Health Sports Park, Carson, California, U.S.	
21	Win	20–1	(Mexico) Juan Antonio Rodriguez	TD	9(10)	2019-05-16	(United States) Fantasy Springs Casino, Indio, U.S.	Won vacant WBO–NABO lightweight title
20	Win	19–1	(India) Kuldeep Dhanda	KO	2 (10)	2019-03-09	Midas Hotel and Casino, Pasay, Philippines	Won vacant WBA Asia lightweight title
19	Win	18–1	(Mexico) Ezequiel Aviles	UD	8	2018-09-29	(United States) Fantasy Springs Casino, Indio, U.S.	
18	Win	17–1	(Mexico) Gilberto Josué González	UD	10	2018-05-17	(United States) Fantasy Springs Casino, Indio, U.S.	
17	Win	16–1	(Mexico) Yardley Armenta Cruz	KO	1 (10)	2018-01-17	(United States) Forum, Inglewood, U.S.	
16	Win	15–1	(Mexico) Juan Pablo Sanchez	UD	8	23 Sep 2017	(United States) Forum, Inglewood, U.S.	
15	Win	14–1	(Philippines) Jason Tinampay	TKO	2 (8)	2017-06-10	Robinson’s Mall Atrium, General Santos, Philippines	
14	Win	13–1	(United States) Christian Gonzalez	KO	2 (8)	2017-03-10	(United States) Belasco Theater, Los Angeles, U.S.	Won vacant WBC Youth Intercontinental lightweight title
13	Win	12–1	(Philippines) Gabby Simpo	TKO	1 (6)	2016-12-04	Robinson’s Mall Atrium, General Santos, Philippines	
12	Win	11–1	(Thailand) Paiboon Lorkham	KO	1 (8)	2016-09-10	(Philippines) Tupi Municipal Gymnasium, Tupi, Thailand	Won vacant WBC–ABC super featherweight title
11	Win	10–1	(Philippines) Eusebio Baluarte	RTD	4 (8)	2016-06-26	Gaisano Mall Atrium of General Santos City, General Santos, Philippines	
10	Loss	9–1	(Russia) Mikhail Alexeev	UD	8	2016-05-06	DIVS, Ekaterinburg, Russia	For vacant WBO Youth super featherweight title
9	Win	9–0	(Philippines) Jason Egera	RTD	8 (10)	2016-02-13	Gaisano Mall Atrium of General Santos City, General Santos, Philippines	
8	Win	8–0	(Philippines) Eusebio Baluarte	RTD	3 (8)	2015-10-07	Glan Municipal Hall, Glan, Philippines	
7	Win	7–0	(Philippines) Joas Apericio	KO	4 (10)	2015-08-14	SM City Annex, Ecoland, Davao City, Philippines	
6	Win	6–0	(Philippines) Arnel Acebuque	TKO	5 (8)	2015-05-30	Lagao Gym, General Santos, Philippines	
5	Win	5–0	(Philippines) Elmer Colve	TKO	5 (8)	2015-02-28	Zamboanga City, Philippines	
4	Win	4–0	(Philippines) Rey Liparanon	KO	1 (6)	2015-01-17	Oval Plaza Covered Court, General Santos, Philippines	
3	Win	3–0	(Philippines) Rowel Garcia	KO	2 (6)	2014-11-27	Safii Compound Gymnasium, Barangay Tambler, General Santos, Philippines	
2	Win	2–0	(Philippines) Frejun Dela Cruz	UD	4	2014-09-13	Lagao Gym, General Santos, Philippines	
1	Win	1–0	(Philippines) Michael Manambay	TKO	1 (4)	2014-07-02	Bula Gymnasium, Barangay Bula, General Santos, Philippines	
