= Devin Haney vs. Ryan Garcia =

Boxing competition

This One Counts
- Date: April 20, 2024
- Venue: Barclays Center, Brooklyn, New York City, New York, U.S.

Tale of the tape
| Boxer | Devin Haney | Ryan Garcia |
| Nickname | The Dream | King |
| Hometown | San Francisco, California, U.S. | Victorville, California, U.S. |
| Pre-fight record | 31–0 (15 KOs) | 24–1 (20 KOs) |
| Age | 25 years, 5 months | 25 years, 8 months |
| Height | 5 ft 9 in (175 cm) | 5 ft 8 1/2 in (174 cm) |
| Weight | 140 lb (64 kg) | 143.2 lb (65 kg) |
| Style | Orthodox | Orthodox |
| Recognition | WBC; Super Lightweight champion The Ring No. 7 ranked pound-for-pound fighter 2-division world champion | WBC; No. 6 Ranked Super Lightweight; Former WBC interim lightweight champion |

Result
- Garcia originally wins a majority decision in 12 rounds (115–109, 112–112, 114–110); later overturned to a no contest after he failed a drug test

Devin Haney vs. Ryan Garcia, billed as This One Counts, was a professional boxing match contested in the super lightweight division between WBC super lightweight champion, Devin Haney, and former WBC interim lightweight champion, Ryan Garcia. The bout took place on 20 April 2024 at the Barclays Center in Brooklyn, New York.

The contest was originally declared a majority decision victory for Garcia, before being changed to a no contest after Garcia had tested positive for Ostarine.

== Background ==
On February 9, 2024, it was announced that Haney vs. Garcia was signed for April 20, 2024, in Las Vegas, Nevada, for Haney’s WBC super lightweight title.

The title of the fight, This One Counts, is a reference to the six prior matches between Haney and Garcia in amateur boxing, with this one being their first official match in professional boxing. The last time they fought was in January 2015, in the quarterfinals of the USA Youth National Championships. Their record in the amateurs stood evenly tied at 3–3.

Two days before the fight, Garcia agreed to a wager with Haney that Garcia would pay $500,000 for every pound over the limit should he miss weight.

Garcia later weighed in at 143.2lbs, 3.2lbs over the championship limit, and would forfeit up to $600,000 of his purse to Haney. Due to Garcia missing the 140lbs weight limit, Haney's WBC super lightweight title was no longer at stake.

== The fight ==
Garcia won the bout via majority decision. Garcia knocked down Haney three times in rounds 7, 10, and 11 before coming away with the victory by Majority Decision (114–110, 115–109, 112–112).

Garcia out-landed Haney 106–87 in total punches and 95–45 in power punches. Garcia landed 41% of his power punches, while Haney's previous 10 opponents landed 25%. Haney landed 7 of 18 punches per round, whereas he had landed 13 of 42 in his previous 10 fights.

=== Official scorecards ===
| Judge | Fighter | 1 | 2 | 3 | 4 | 5 | 6 | 7 | 8 | 9 | 10 | 11 | 12 | Total |
|---|---|---|---|---|---|---|---|---|---|---|---|---|---|---|
| Max DeLuca | Haney | 9 | 10 | 10 | 10 | 10 | 10 | 8 | 10 | 10 | 8 | 8 | 9 | 112 |
| Max DeLuca | Garcia | 10 | 9 | 9 | 9 | 9 | 9 | 9 | 9 | 9 | 10 | 10 | 10 | 112 |
| Eric Marlinski | Haney | 9 | 10 | 10 | 10 | 10 | 9 | 8 | 10 | 9 | 8 | 8 | 9 | 110 |
| Eric Marlinski | Garcia | 10 | 9 | 9 | 9 | 9 | 10 | 9 | 9 | 10 | 10 | 10 | 10 | 114 |
| Robin Taylor | Haney | 9 | 10 | 10 | 10 | 10 | 9 | 8 | 9 | 9 | 8 | 8 | 9 | 109 |
| Robin Taylor | Garcia | 10 | 9 | 9 | 9 | 9 | 10 | 9 | 10 | 10 | 10 | 10 | 10 | 115 |

== Fight card ==
Main card
| Weight class | | vs. | | Method | Round | Time | Notes |
|---|---|---|---|---|---|---|---|
| Super Lightweight | Devin Haney (c) | vs. | Ryan Garcia | NC | 12/12 | | ^{Note 1} ^{Note 2} |
| Super Lightweight | Arnold Barboza Jr. (c) | def. | Seán McComb | SD | 10/10 | | ^{Note 3} |
| Super Middleweight | Bektemir Melikuziev (c) | def. | Pierre Dibombe | TD | 8/10 | 2:58 | ^{Note 4} |
| Super Flyweight | David Jiménez | def. | Johnny Ramirez | UD | 12/12 | | ^{Note 5} |
| Super Welterweight | Charles Conwell | def. | Nathaniel Gallimore | TKO | 6/10 | 0:52 |
Undercard
| Super Middleweight | Sergiy Derevyanchenko | def. | Vaughn Alexander | UD | 10/10 |
| Super Middleweight | Darius Fulghum | def. | Cristian Olivas | TKO | 4/8 | 0:52 |
| Super Lightweight | Johnny Canas | def. | Markus Bowes | UD | 4/4 |
| Middleweight | Amari Jones | def. | Armel Mbumba | TKO | 6/8 | 0:39 |
| Super Middleweight | Kevin Newman II | def. | Eric Robles | TKO | 4/6 | 1:53 |
| Lightweight | Shamar Canal | def. | Pedro Borgaro | UD | 6/6 |

^Note 1 WBC super lightweight title.
^Note 2 Originally a majority decision win for Garcia; changed to a no contest due to Garcia failing a drug test.
^Note 3 For WBO inter-continental super lightweight title.
^Note 4 For WBA inter-continental super middleweight title.
^Note 5 For vacant interim WBA super flyweight title.

== Aftermath ==
=== Failed drug test ===
On May 1, the Voluntary Anti-Doping Association notified all involved parties that Garcia had tested positive for Ostarine, a performance-enhancing drug, the day before and the day of his fight with Haney. Garcia responded via social media, denying the accusations and citing his willingness to take the drug test.

On June 20th, 2024, via the New York State Athletic Commission the result of the fight was changed to a no contest, with Haney remaining undefeated and reclaimed the title while Garcia regaining his purse back.
