= Majority decision =

Winning criterion in combat sports

A majority decision (MD) is a winning criterion in several full-contact combat sports, such as boxing, kickboxing, Muay Thai, mixed martial arts and other sports involving striking. In a majority decision, two of the three judges agree on which fighter won the match, while the third judge indicates that neither fighter won (i.e., a "draw").

In boxing, each of the three judges allocates a score (round by round) for each fighter. If all scheduled rounds are completed (i.e., no knockout (technical included)), each judge totals the points for all rounds. If the same fighter scores more points than the other on two of the judges' scorecards, but the third judge scored equally for both fighters (a draw), the official victory is awarded to the agreed-upon (by a 2 to 1 'majority') fighter. If all judges rule for the same boxer, the decision is referred to as a unanimous decision.

The majority decision is frequently confused with the term split decision, but they are not the same. A split decision occurs when two judges pick the same fighter as the winner, while the third judge decides that the opposite fighter won. On very rare occasions, two judges vote for a draw while the third chooses a winner—this is a majority draw.

== Notable examples ==
Date	Fight	Scorecards			Source
November 6, 1993	Riddick Bowe vs. Evander Holyfield II	115–113 Holyfield	115–114 Holyfield	114–114	
April 22, 1994	Evander Holyfield vs. Michael Moorer	116–112 Moorer	115–114 Moorer	114–114	
May 10, 1996	Lennox Lewis vs. Ray Mercer	96–94 Lewis	96–95 Lewis	95–95	
November 8, 2003	Antonio Tarver vs. Roy Jones Jr.	117–111 Jones	116–112 Jones	114–114	
December 20, 2008	Nikolai Valuev vs. Evander Holyfield	116–112 Valuev	115–114 Valuev	114–114	
November 12, 2011	Manny Pacquiao vs. Juan Manuel Marquez III	116–112 Pacquiao	115–113 Pacquiao	114–114	
September 14, 2013	Floyd Mayweather Jr. vs. Canelo Álvarez	117–111 Mayweather	116–112 Mayweather	114–114	
May 3, 2014	Floyd Mayweather Jr. vs. Marcos Maidana	117–111 Mayweather	116–112 Mayweather	114–114	
June 21, 2014	Vasyl Lomachenko vs. Gary Russell Jr.	116–112 Lomachenko	116–112 Lomachenko	114–114	
August 16, 2014	Shawn Porter vs. Kell Brook	117–111 Brook	116–112 Brook	114–114	
August 20, 2016	Nate Diaz vs. Conor McGregor II	48–47 McGregor	48–47 McGregor	47–47	
December 10, 2016	Joseph Parker vs. Andy Ruiz Jr.	115–113 Parker	115–113 Parker	114–114	
September 16, 2018	Canelo Álvarez vs. Gennady Golovkin II	115–113 Álvarez	115–113 Álvarez	114–114	
January 27, 2018	Oleksandr Usyk vs. Mairis Briedis	115–113 Usyk	115–113 Usyk	114–114	
March 18, 2023	Leon Edwards vs. Kamaru Usman III	48–46 Edwards	48-46 Edwards	47-47	
April 20, 2024	Devin Haney vs. Ryan Garcia	115–109 Garcia	114–110 Garcia	112–112	
October 12, 2024	Artur Beterbiev vs. Dmitry Bivol	116–112 Beterbiev	115–113 Beterbiev	114–114	
February 22, 2025	Artur Beterbiev vs. Dmitry Bivol II	116–112 Bivol	115–113 Bivol	114–114	
August 22, 2026	Rolando Romero vs. Teofimo Lopez	116–112 Lopez	115–113 Lopez	114–114	
