= Canelo Alvarez vs. Christian Mbilli =

Professional boxing event held on 31 October 2026

- Date: 31 October 2026
- Venue: The Venue, Riyadh, Saudi Arabia
- Title on the line: WBC super middleweight title

Tale of the tape
Boxer	Canelo Álvarez	Christian M'billi
Nickname	Canelo	Solide
Pre-fight record	62–3–2 (39 KO)	29–0–1 (24 KO)

Result
- Álvarez wins by unanimous decision (115–112, 116–111, 117–110)

Canelo Álvarez vs. Christian Mbilli was a professional boxing event held on 31 October 2026 at The Venue in Riyadh, Saudi Arabia. The main event saw Canelo Álvarez challenge Christian M'billi for the WBC super middleweight title. Álvarez won by unanimous decision to regain the title. The card was broadcast on DAZN pay-per-view.

== Background ==
Álvarez returned to the ring for the first time since September 2025, when he lost his undisputed super middleweight titles to Terence Crawford. Mbilli had been the WBC interim champion and was elevated to full champion after Crawford's retirement. His previous fight was a split draw with Lester Martínez in Las Vegas.

Mbilli entered unbeaten at 29–0–1 (24 KOs) and was making the first defence of the title as full champion. At the weigh-in on 30 October, Álvarez weighed 167.6 lb and Mbilli 167.8 lb.

=== Announcement ===
Álvarez vs. Mbilli was initially announced in May, with the fight set to headline The Ring's 'Mexico vs. The World' event in Saudi Arabia set for September. However, the fight was ultimately pushed back, with Ryan Garcia vs. Conor Benn instead filling that slot. In July, Alvarez revealed that the fight was instead going to take place on Halloween.

== Fight card ==
Weight class	Fighters			Method	Round	Time	Notes
Main card (DAZN PPV)
Super middleweight	Canelo Álvarez	def.	Christian M'billi (c)	UD	12	3:00	For the WBC super middleweight title
Super middleweight	Jaime Munguía (c)	def.	Nikita Zon	UD	12	3:00	Retained the WBA super middleweight title (first defence)
Featherweight	Rafael Espinoza (c)	def.	Ricardo Blandón	TKO	3	1:22	Retained the WBO featherweight title (fifth defence); stopped by the ringside doctor due to a cut
Super featherweight	Reito Tsutsumi	def.	Raymundo Rojas García	TKO	2	2:27	
Preliminary card
Featherweight	Carl Jammes Martin	def.	David Picasso (c)	SD	10	3:00	Won the WBC Silver featherweight title (95–94, 94–95, 96–93)
Super featherweight	Sultan Almohammed	def.	Erick Jahir Urvina Villegas	UD	6	3:00	
Super middleweight	Bek Nurmaganbet	def.	Marcos Vázquez Rodríguez	KO	1	2:57	
Middleweight	Carlos Emilio Rojo Vázquez	def.	Flavius Biea	TKO	4	1:38	
Super middleweight	Brayan León Salgado	def.	Héctor Octavio Aguirre Martínez	UD	8	3:00	

== Main event ==
The main event was a 12-round super middleweight championship bout. Referee Hector Afu deducted a point from Mbilli in the eighth round for punches below the belt. The judges scored the bout 115–112, 116–111 and 117–110 for Álvarez, who regained the title and handed Mbilli the first loss of his professional career, moving to 63–3–2 while Mbilli fell to 29–1–1.

=== Reaction ===
Forbes reported that the point deduction followed complaints from Álvarez about low blows and punches behind the head, and that DAZN commentators Todd Grisham and Tony Bellew criticised Álvarez over the sequence. After the fight, Álvarez said he was thankful to be a champion again after 21 years as a professional.

== Broadcasting ==
Country/Region	Broadcaster
Worldwide	DAZN (PPV)
United Kingdom	DAZN
