= The Ring (magazine) =

Boxing magazine

- Trade name: The Ring
- Type: Private
- Industry: Boxing promotion Sports magazine
- Founded: 1922; 104 years ago
- Headquarters: Dubai, United Arab Emirates
- Key people: Turki Alalshikh (Owner); Rick Reeno (CEO)
- Parent: The Ring Magazine FZ-LLC
- Website: ringmagazine.com

The Ring
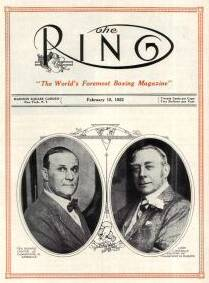
- Cover of the first issue
- Editor-in-Chief: Douglass Fischer
- Former editors: Nat Fleischer
- Categories: Sports magazine
- Publisher: Stefan Friedman
- Founded: 1922; 104 years ago
- Country: United States
- Based in: Los Angeles, California; Blue Bell, Pennsylvania; Dubai, United Arab Emirates
- Language: English
- Website: Official website
- ISSN: 0035-5410

The Ring Magazine (Publishing) (often called The Ring or Ring magazine) is a boxing magazine, that was first published in 1922 as a boxing and wrestling magazine. As the sporting legitimacy of professional wrestling became increasingly dubious, The Ring shifted to becoming exclusively an all boxing publication.

Ring began publishing annual ratings of boxers in 1924. Following the November/December issue in 2022, the magazine announced it would halt its print editions, while remaining a digital only publication with occasional special print editions. However, in 2025 following a revitalization under new owner Turki Al-Sheikh, The Ring once again returned to regular monthly print issues.

== History ==
The Ring, founded and published by future International Boxing Hall of Fame member Nat Fleischer, has perpetrated boxing scandals, helped make unknown fighters famous worldwide, and covered boxing's biggest events of all time. Dan Daniel was a co-founder and prolific contributor to The Ring through most of its history.

Another founding partner was John L. "Ike" Dorgan (April 15, 1879 – December 27, 1960), a bookbinder, boxing manager (for Harry Ebbets and Charles Francis "Frank" Moran, known as "The Fighting Dentist"), press agent (for boxing promoter George L. "Tex" Rickard), and publicity manager for the Madison Square Garden. He remained with this influential publication until his retirement in 1930.

The Ring refers to itself (and is referred to by others) as "The Bible of Boxing." During the Fleischer years, the contents page or indicia of every issue carried the claim: "The Ring is a magazine which a man may take home with him. He may leave it on his library table safe in the knowledge that it does not contain one line of matter either in the text or the advertisements which would be offensive. The publisher of The Ring guards this reputation of his magazine jealously. It is entertaining and it is clean."

In 1972, following Fleischer's death, his son-in-law and managing editor Nat Loubet took over as publisher. In 1977, Loubet launched three international editions of the magazine. The Spanish version, Ring En Español, was published in Venezuela and distributed to all Spanish-speaking countries and the United States (U.S.) until 1985. There was also a Japanese version published in Tokyo and a French version published in Paris.

In 1977, managing editor of The Ring Johnny Ort, fabricated records of selected boxers, and elevated their rankings, securing them lucrative fights on the American ABC television network, as part of the United States Championship Tournament orchestrated by promoter Don King. The deception was uncovered by boxing writer Malcolm "Flash" Gordon and ABC staffer Alex Wallau and the United States Championship tournament was cancelled by ABC.

In 1979, the magazine was purchased from Loubet by a group led by Dave DeBusschere and Bert Sugar took over as editor. In 1983 Sugar was succeeded by future New York boxing commissioner Randy Gordon. By 1984 the publication was reported to be over $1 million in debt and a number of top salaried employees, including Gordon, were let go. Nigel Collins of the Ring's defunct sister magazine Boxing Illustrated took over as editor. In 1989 The Ring was purchased by Stanley Weston's G.C. London Publishing (later known as Kappa Publishing Group), which also published KO Magazine and a number of wrestling publications. KO senior writer Steve Farhood became The Ring's editor. Weston was a sentimentalist and 52 years after joining The Ring magazine as a stock boy, Weston purchased the magazine that gave him his first job. He not only resurrected the magazine from its imminent collapse, he re-established the publication as the definitive source for boxing news. An outstanding boxing artist, Weston painted 57 covers for The Ring with his first cover, a painting of Billy Conn, for the December 1939 issue. Weston was also a photographer who, according to his own estimate, shot over 100,000 boxing photos‍—‌the majority of which are housed in the archives of The Ring magazine.

Sports and Entertainment Publications, LLC, a subsidiary of Oscar De La Hoya's Golden Boy Enterprises, acquired The Ring, KO Magazine, and World Boxing in 2007. The magazine's rankings are recognized as "official" by some in the U.S. media, particularly ESPN. While some may see a conflict of interest in a boxing promoter being paymaster of what is essentially a magazine/rankings organization that awards world titles and belts, De La Hoya says that is not the case. "These magazines will be held in an editorial trust where they will be operating totally independent of any influence from me or others from the Golden Boy Companies as it relates to editorial direction or content". Also there is a 35-member ratings advisory panel, which include many of the media that cover boxing, who would prevent Golden Boy Promotions from using the magazine for self gain.

The Ring was headquartered in Blue Bell, Pennsylvania until 2011 when it was relocated to Los Angeles.

The magazine had a sister publication named The Ring Wrestling which came about due to professional wrestling writer Bob Leonard contacting the magazine and expressing that it was too focused on boxing and not giving wrestling enough coverage. Nat Loubet served as the editor of the wrestling magazine as well.

In December 2022, The Ring relocated from Los Angeles to Dubai after discontinuing their regular monthly print issues in the United States.

In November 2024, The Ring was acquired by Turki Alalshikh, chairman of the General Entertainment Authority and a major figure in the global boxing renaissance. Alalshikh had already been instrumental in bringing major events to Saudi Arabia under the Riyadh Season umbrella. After the acquisition, The Ring began to evolve from a neutral publication into an active promotional brand. Under Alalshikh's direction, the magazine retained its editorial team and rankings panel but expanded its operations to include event promotion, branding partnerships, and cross-industry collaborations. The transition formally materialized in 2025 with the launch of Ring-branded boxing, with the first major event being Ryan Garcia vs. Rolando Romero – Fatal Fury in Times Square.

=== Controversies ===
In their book Iron Ambition: My Life With Cus D'Amato, Mike Tyson and Larry Sloman, while depicting the rise of the International Boxing Club of New York and D'Amato's battle with the organization, allege that the magazine and its then-owner and editor-in-chief Nat Fleischer were under control of the IBC and the rankings were heavily favorable towards the fighters it controlled.

In the 1970s, managing editor of The Ring Johnny Ort fabricated records of selected boxers to elevate them, thereby securing them lucrative fights on the American ABC television network, as part of the United States Championship Tournament, orchestrated by promoter Don King. The scandal was uncovered by boxing writer Malcolm "Flash" Gordon and ABC staffer Alex Wallau. After Gordon and Wallau's evidence was presented to ABC executive Roone Arledge, the United States Championship tournament was cancelled. The scandal would lead to the eventual resignation of New York State Boxing Commissioner James A. Farley Jr., who had lent his name to the Championship fights.

== Cover art ==
Some of the boxers featured on the magazine covers have included Tommy Ryan, Salvador Sánchez, Jack Dempsey, Pancho Villa, Max Schmeling, Joe Louis, Sugar Ray Robinson, Jake LaMotta, Rocky Marciano, Willie Pep, Ingemar Johansson, Muhammad Ali, Alexis Argüello, Wilfred Benítez, Wilfredo Gómez, Roberto Durán, Larry Holmes, Marvin Hagler, Sugar Ray Leonard, Bud Taylor, Mike Tyson, Evander Holyfield, Floyd Mayweather Jr., Thomas Hearns, Naoya Inoue, Roy Jones Jr., Bernard Hopkins, Julio César Chávez, Félix Trinidad, Manny Pacquiao, Oscar De La Hoya, Mauro Mina and Ricardo Mayorga. In 1978, boxer Cathy "Cat" Davis became the first woman ever to be on a cover of The Ring, and she held the distinction of being the only woman featured on the cover of the magazine until January 2016, when Ronda Rousey joined her and also became the first mixed martial arts fighter featured on its cover. The Ring has used cover artwork created by famed artists such as LeRoy Neiman and Richard T. Slone.

== Boxing events ==
On March 5, 2025, TKO Group Holdings (TKO) announced a partnership with Turki Alalshikh and Saudi entertainment conglomerate Sela to launch a new boxing promotion in 2026. Shortly after this announcement, rumors about disagreements between TKO's Dana White and Alalshikh about the promotion for a fight between Canelo Álvarez and Terence Crawford started circulating on social media. These disagreements allegedly prompted Alalshikh to venture into boxing promotion himself under "The Ring" banner. The first event advertised under The Ring banner in partnership with SNK took place on April 26, 2025, with Eubank Jr vs. Benn – Fatal Fury at the Tottenham Hotspur Stadium in London.

=== Events ===
#	Event	Date	Venue	Main event	Co-Promoters
1	Eubank Jr vs. Benn – Fatal Fury	April 26, 2025	Tottenham Hotspur Stadium, London, UK	Chris Eubank Jr. vs. Conor Benn	Matchroom Boxing, Boxxer
2	Ryan Garcia vs. Rolando Romero – Fatal Fury in Times Square	May 2, 2025	Times Square, New York City, New York, USA	Ryan Garcia vs. Rolly Romero	Golden Boy Promotions, Matchroom Boxing, Top Rank
3	Ring III: Berlanga vs. Sheeraz	July 13, 2025	Louis Armstrong Stadium, Queens, New York, USA	Edgar Berlanga vs. Hamzah Sheeraz	Matchroom Boxing, Queensberry Promotions, Top Rank
4	The Ring Presents: The Underdog	September 11, 2025	Fontainebleau Las Vegas, Las Vegas, Nevada, USA	Anthony Olascuaga vs. Juan Carlos Camacho	Zuffa Boxing
5	The Ring: Unfinished Business – Eubank Jr. vs. Conor Benn II	November 15, 2025	Tottenham Hotspur Stadium, London, UK	Chris Eubank Jr. vs. Conor Benn	Matchroom Boxing, Boxxer
6	Ring IV: Benavidez vs. Yarde – Night of the Champions	November 22, 2025	ANB Arena, Riyadh, Saudi Arabia	David Benavidez vs. Anthony Yarde	Queensberry Promotions, Top Rank, Sela
7	Ring V: Night of the Samurai	November 27, 2025	Mohammed Abdo Arena, Riyadh, Saudi Arabia	Naoya Inoue vs. David Picasso	Matchroom Boxing
8	Ring VI: Teofimo vs. Shakur	January 31, 2026	Madison Square Garden, New York City, New York USA	Teofimo Lopez vs. Shakur Stevenson	Matchroom Boxing, Top Rank
9	The Ring: High Stakes – Barrios vs. Garcia	February 21, 2026	T-Mobile Arena, Las Vegas, Nevada, USA	Mario Barrios vs. Ryan Garcia	Golden Boy Promotions, TGB Promotions
10	Fury vs. Makhmudov	April 11, 2026	Tottenham Hotspur Stadium, London, UK	Tyson Fury vs. Arslanbek Makhmudov	Gold Star Promotions
10	Usyk vs. Rico – Glory in Giza	May 23, 2026	Giza pyramid complex, Giza, Egypt	Oleksandr Usyk vs. Rico Verhoeven	Matchroom Boxing, Gold Star Promotions
11	Garcia vs. Benn	Sept 12, 2026	T-Mobile Arena, Las Vegas, Nevada, USA	Ryan Garcia vs. Conor Benn	Zuffa Boxing, Golden Boy Promotions
12	Mexico vs The World: Alvarez vs. Mbilli	October 31, 2026	The Venue, Riyadh, Saudi Arabia	Canelo Alvarez vs. Christian Mbilli	Premier Boxing Promotions, Sela
13	Fury vs. Joshua	December 11, 2026	Principality Stadium, Cardiff, Wales	Tyson Fury vs. Anthony Joshua	Matchroom Boxing, Queensberry Promotions, Sela

== World champions ==
The Ring has its own championship belt in a given weight class where The Ring champion holds a lineal reign to the throne, the man who beat the man. The Ring began awarding championship belts in 1922. The first Ring world title belt was awarded to heavyweight champion Jack Dempsey and the second was awarded to flyweight champion Pancho Villa. The Ring stopped giving belts to world champions in the 1990s, then reintroduced their titles in their April 2002 magazine. In their reintroduction of the titles, they awarded four boxers with The Ring title—Lennox Lewis, Roy Jones Jr, Bernard Hopkins, and Kostya Tszyu.

The Ring stated that their title was "intended to reward fighters who, by satisfying rigid criteria, can justify a claim as the true and only world champion in a given weight class". It echoed many critics' arguments that the sanctioning bodies in charge of boxing championships had undermined the sport by pitting undeserving contenders against undeserving "champions" and forcing the boxing public to see mismatches for so-called "world championships". The Ring attempts to be more authoritative and open than the sanctioning bodies' rankings, with a page devoted to full explanations for ranking changes. A fighter pays no sanctioning fees to defend or fight for the title at stake, contrary to practices of the sanctioning bodies.

However, many boxing journalists complained that The Ring ignored the world championship lineage when they started awarding titles again. A controversy described by Cliff Rold of BoxingScene.com is for example, the "world" light-heavyweight title was considered vacant from the time Michael Spinks went up to heavyweight in 1985 until 1996. While the Cyber Boxing Zone and the International Boxing Research Organization considers Virgil Hill's defeat of Henry Maske (who were the two highest rated light-heavyweights) as the beginning of the new lineage, The Ring awarded their newly reintroduced title to Roy Jones. In 2002, The Ring editor, Nigel Collins, acknowledged that if their championship policy was in place in 1997, Dariusz Michalczewski, who defeated Hill, "probably would have been The Ring Champion."

Under the original version of the championship policy, there were only two ways that a boxer could win The Ring's title: defeat the reigning champion; or win a box-off between the magazine's number-one and number-two rated contenders (or, sometimes, number-one and number-three rated). A vacant Ring championship was filled when the number-one contender in a weight-division battles the number-two contender or the number-three contender (in cases where The Ring determined that the number-two and number-three contenders were close in abilities and records). The ratings are compiled by the magazine's editorial board, with the participation of The Ring Ratings Panel of boxing journalists from around the world. A fighter could not be stripped of the title unless he lost, decided to move to another weight division, or retired.

In May 2012, citing the number of vacancies in various weight classes as primary motivation, The Ring unveiled a new championship policy. Under the new policy, The Ring title can be awarded when the No. 1 and No. 2 fighters face one another or when the No. 1 and 2 contenders choose not to fight one another and either of them fights No. 3, No. 4 or No. 5, the winner may be awarded The Ring belt. In addition, there are now seven ways for a fighter to lose his title:

- The champion loses a fight in the weight class in which he is champion.
- The champion moves to another weight class.
- The champion does not schedule a fight in any weight class for 18 months.
- The champion does not schedule a fight at his championship weight for 18 months (even if he fights at another weight).
- The champion does not schedule a fight with a top five contender from any weight class for two years.
- The champion retires.
- The champion tests positive for a banned substance.

Many media outlets and members are extremely critical of the new championship policy and state that if this new policy is followed The Ring title will lose the credibility it once held. They then later changed the policy so vacant belts can only be awarded to the winner of No. 1 vs No. 2 or if No. 3 is deemed worthy by The Ring's editorial board.

The purchase of The Ring magazine by Golden Boy Promotions in 2007, the dismissal of editor-in-chief Nigel Collins and several editorial staff in 2011 and a series of questionable ratings decisions by the new editors prompted many members of The Ring Ratings Advisory Panel to resign. This led to the formation of the Transnational Boxing Rankings Board in 2012 headed by boxing historians Springs Toledo, Cliff Rold and Tim Starks.

Golden Boy publicized The Ring's World Championship when the title is at stake in fights it promotes (such as Joe Calzaghe vs. Roy Jones Jr. in 2008).

=== Current champions ===
==== Men's ====
As of October 24, 2026

Weight class	Champion	Date won
Strawweight	Oscar Collazo	November 16, 2024
Junior flyweight	Vacant	
Flyweight	Vacant	
Junior bantamweight	Vacant	
Bantamweight	Vacant	
Junior featherweight	Naoya Inoue	December 26, 2023
Featherweight	Vacant	
Junior lightweight	O'Shaquie Foster	October 24, 2026
Lightweight	Vacant	
Junior welterweight	Shakur Stevenson	January 31, 2026
Welterweight	Vacant	
Junior middleweight	Vacant	
Middleweight	Vacant	
Super middleweight	Vacant	
Light heavyweight	Dmitry Bivol	February 22, 2025
Cruiserweight	Jai Opetaia	July 2, 2022
Heavyweight	Oleksandr Usyk	August 20, 2022

==== Women's ====
As of 12 May 2026

Weight class	Champion	Date won
Atomweight	Vacant	
Strawweight	Vacant	
Junior flyweight	Uninaugurated	
Flyweight	Gabriela Fundora	November 2, 2024
Junior bantamweight	Mizuki Hiruta	May 17, 2025
Bantamweight	Dina Thorslund	September 1, 2023
Junior featherweight	Vacant	
Featherweight	Amanda Serrano	September 24, 2022
Junior lightweight	Alycia Baumgardner	October 15, 2022
Lightweight	Vacant	
Junior welterweight	Katie Taylor	November 25, 2023
Welterweight	Lauren Price	May 11, 2024
Junior middleweight	Vacant	
Middleweight	Vacant	
Super middleweight	Lani Daniels	April 17, 2026

==== By country ====
Country	Total championships	Total men's championships	Total women's championships
United States	5	3	2
United Kingdom	2	1	1
Ukraine	1	1	0
Russia	1	1	0
Australia	1	1	0
Denmark	1	0	1
Ireland	1	0	1
Puerto Rico	1	0	1
New Zealand	1	0	1

== Rankings ==
=== Current rankings ===
==== By country ====
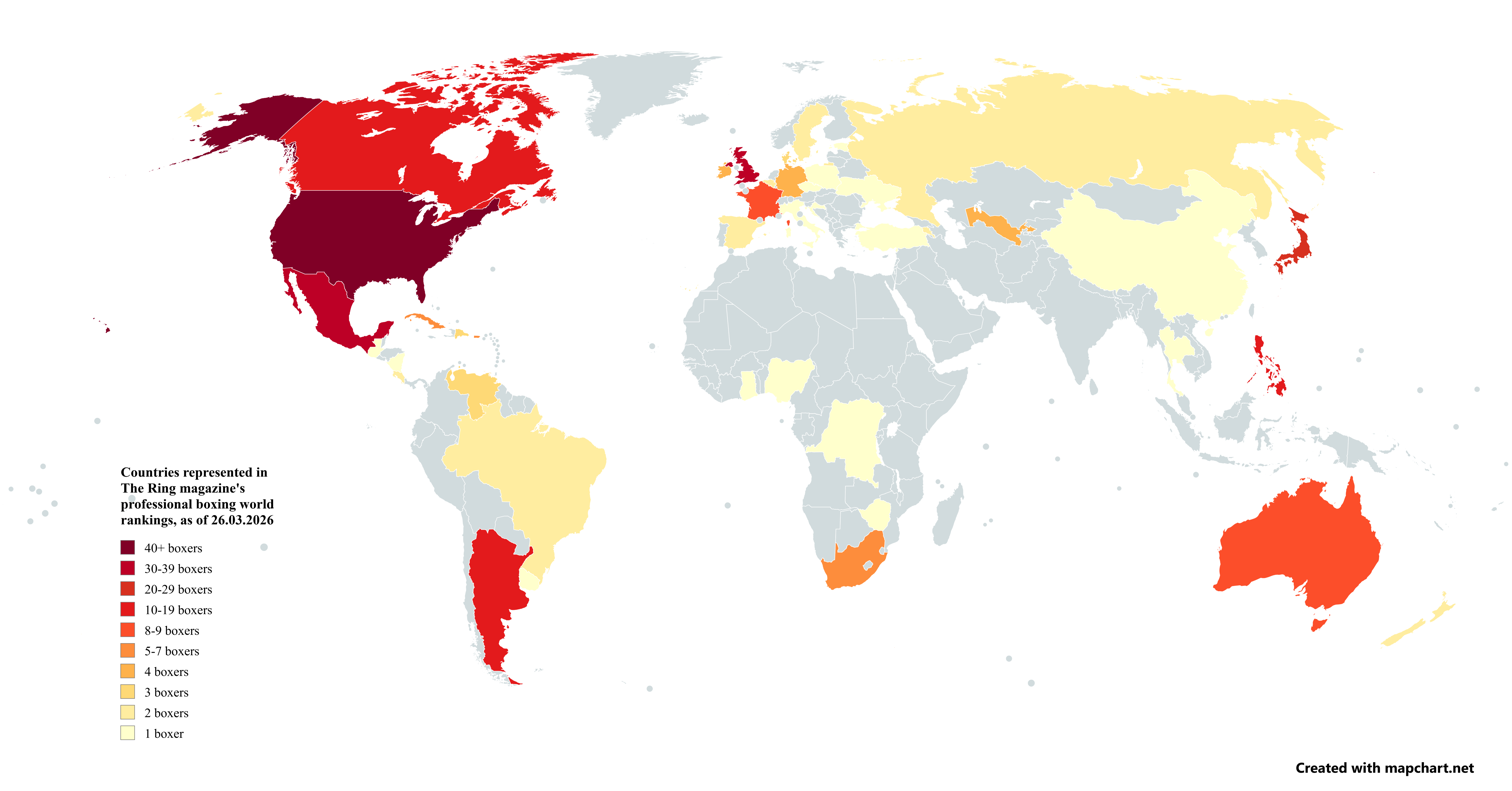
Map of countries by number of boxers represented in The Ring magazine's rankings, as of March 26, 2026

As of March 26, 2026.

Country	Men	Women	Total
United States	40	16	56
United Kingdom	23	11	34
Mexico	21	10	31
Japan	17	5	22
Argentina	4	8	12
Canada	3	8	11
Philippines	10	0	10
Australia	4	4	8
France	3	5	8
Puerto Rico	4	2	6
Cuba	5	0	5
South Africa	5	0	5
Uzbekistan	4	0	4
Ireland	3	1	4
Germany	2	2	4
Venezuela	3	0	3
Dominican Republic	3	0	3
Denmark	1	2	3
Armenia	2	0	2
Sweden	2	0	2
Russia	2	0	2
Brazil	1	1	2
Spain	1	1	2
Costa Rica	1	1	2
Belgium	0	2	2
New Zealand	0	2	2
Ukraine	1	0	1
Croatia	1	0	1
China	1	0	1
DR Congo	1	0	1
Nigeria	1	0	1
Poland	1	0	1
Guatemala	1	0	1
Italy	1	0	1
Lithuania	1	0	1
Ghana	1	0	1
Nicaragua	1	0	1
Thailand	1	0	1
Zimbabwe	1	0	1
Czech Republic	0	1	1
Turkey	0	1	1
Uruguay	0	1	1

=== Current #1 ranked fighters per weight class ===
Note: The Ring champions are also noted as No. 1 fighters

As of March 27, 2026.

==== Men's ====
Weight class	No. 1 ranked fighter
Strawweight	Oscar Collazo
Junior flyweight	René Santiago
Flyweight	Ricardo Sandoval
Junior bantamweight	Jesse Rodriguez
Bantamweight	Seiya Tsutsumi
Junior featherweight	Naoya Inoue
Featherweight	Rafael Espinoza
Junior lightweight	Emanuel Navarrete
Lightweight	Shakur Stevenson
Junior welterweight	Shakur Stevenson
Welterweight	Devin Haney
Junior middleweight	Vergil Ortiz Jr.
Middleweight	Carlos Adames
Super middleweight	Canelo Alvarez
Light heavyweight	Dmitry Bivol
Cruiserweight	Jai Opetaia
Heavyweight	Oleksandr Usyk

==== Women's ====
Weight class	No. 1 ranked fighter
Atomweight	Sumire Yamanaka
Strawweight	Yokasta Valle
Junior flyweight	Evelyn Nazarena Bermúdez
Flyweight	Gabriela Fundora
Junior bantamweight	Mizuki Hiruta
Bantamweight	Dina Thorslund
Junior featherweight	Ellie Scotney
Featherweight	Amanda Serrano
Junior lightweight	Alycia Baumgardner
Lightweight	Caroline Dubois
Junior welterweight	Katie Taylor
Welterweight	Lauren Price
Junior middleweight	Mikaela Mayer
Middleweight	Desley Robinson
Super middleweight	Lani Daniels

==== By country ====
Country	Total No.1 spots	Total men's No.1 spots	Total women's No.1 spots
United States	11	7	4
Japan	4	2	2
Mexico	3	3	0
United Kingdom	3	0	3
Australia	2	1	1
Puerto Rico	2	1	1
Ukraine	1	1	0
Russia	1	1	0
Dominican Republic	1	1	0
Denmark	1	0	1
Ireland	1	0	1
Argentina	1	0	1
Costa Rica	1	0	1

=== List of pound for pound #1 fighters ===
As of November 17, 2026.

Keys:

Current P4P #1

No.	Name	Weight Division(s) as #1	Date	Duration
1	Mike Tyson	Heavyweight	September 12, 1989 – February 12, 1990	153 days
2	Julio César Chávez	Junior welterweight	February 12, 1990 – September 15, 1993	3 years, 215 days
3	Pernell Whitaker	Welterweight; Junior middleweight	September 15, 1993 – April 18, 1996	2 years, 219 days
4	Roy Jones Jr.	Light heavyweight	April 18, 1996 – April 17, 1997	364 days
5	Oscar De La Hoya	Welterweight	April 17, 1997 – October 5, 1999	2 years, 171 days
6	Roy Jones Jr. (2)	Light heavyweight	October 5, 1999 – July 5, 2000	274 days
7	Shane Mosley	Welterweight	July 5, 2000 – January 27, 2002	1 year, 206 days
8	Bernard Hopkins	Middleweight	January 27, 2002 – March 11, 2003	1 year, 43 days
9	Roy Jones Jr. (3)	Light heavyweight; Heavyweight	March 11, 2003 – June 8, 2004	1 year, 89 days
10	Bernard Hopkins (2)	Middleweight	June 8, 2004 – July 18, 2005	1 year, 40 days
11	Floyd Mayweather Jr.	Junior welterweight; Welterweight; Junior middleweight	July 18, 2005 – June 9, 2008	2 years, 327 days
12	Manny Pacquiao	Junior lightweight; Lightweight; Junior welterweight; Welterweight; Junior middleweight	June 9, 2008 – May 7, 2012	3 years, 333 days
The Ring decided to vacate the pound-for-pound #1 rank and demoted Pacquiao to #2 that resulted in a tie with Mayweather Jr. because the members of the editorial board were unimpressed by Pacquiao's performance in his third fight with Juan Manuel Márquez, while Mayweather Jr. was not promoted to #1 because the board determined that he struggled in his fight against Miguel Cotto.
13	Floyd Mayweather Jr. (2)	Welterweight; Junior middleweight	December 11, 2012 – September 15, 2015	2 years, 278 days
14	Román González	Flyweight; Junior bantamweight	September 15, 2015 – March 21, 2017	1 year, 187 days
15	Andre Ward	Light heavyweight	March 21 – September 26, 2017	189 days
16	Gennady Golovkin	Middleweight	September 26, 2017 – September 18, 2018	357 days
17	Vasiliy Lomachenko	Lightweight	September 18, 2018 – November 7, 2019	1 year, 50 days
18	Canelo Álvarez	Middleweight; Super middleweight; Light heavyweight	November 7, 2019 – May 7, 2022	2 years, 181 days
19	Oleksandr Usyk	Heavyweight	May 7 – June 11, 2022	35 days
20	Naoya Inoue	Bantamweight	June 11 – August 20, 2022	70 days
21	Oleksandr Usyk (2)	Heavyweight	August 20, 2022 – July 29, 2023	343 days
22	Terence Crawford	Welterweight	July 29, 2023 – May 6, 2024	282 days
23	Naoya Inoue (2)	Junior featherweight	May 6 – May 18, 2024	12 days
24	Oleksandr Usyk (3)	Heavyweight	May 18, 2024 – September 15, 2025	1 year, 120 days
25	Terence Crawford (2)	Super middleweight	September 15 – December 24, 2025	100 days
26	Oleksandr Usyk (4)	Heavyweight	December 24, 2025 – May 4, 2026	131 days
27	Naoya Inoue (3)	Junior featherweight	May 4, 2026 – present	197 days

== See also ==
- List of The Ring world champions
- List of The Ring pound for pound rankings
- List of fights between two The Ring pound for pound boxers
- The Ring magazine Fighter of the Year
- The Ring magazine Fight of the Year
- The Ring magazine Knockout of the Year
- The Ring magazine Comeback of the Year
- The Ring magazine Round of the Year
- The Ring magazine Upset of the Year
- The Ring magazine Prospect of the Year (discontinued between 1989 and 2010)
- The Ring magazine Event of the Year
- The Ring magazine Hall of Fame
- The Ring magazine Pound for Pound
- The Ring magazine Progress of the Year (discontinued)
- The Ring: Boxing the 20th Century
- List of professional wrestling magazines
