= Tyson Fury vs. Anthony Joshua =

Boxing competition

Finally
- Official Poster
- Date: December 11, 2026
- Venue: Principality Stadium, Cardiff, Wales
- Title on the line: Vacant WBA (Super) heavyweight title

Tale of the tape
Boxer	Tyson Fury	Anthony Joshua
Nickname	The Gypsy King	AJ
Pre-fight record	36–2–1 (25 KO)	30–4 (27 KO)

Tyson Fury vs. Anthony Joshua, billed as Finally, is a heavyweight professional boxing match between Tyson Fury and Anthony Joshua, scheduled to take place on 11 December 2026 at the Principality Stadium in Cardiff, Wales, for the vacant WBA (Super) heavyweight title. The event will be streamed globally on Netflix.

== Background ==
Fury and Joshua, both former world heavyweight champions, were long discussed as opponents in a domestic super-fight, but negotiations repeatedly stalled. Both men have been beaten twice by Oleksandr Usyk.

=== Tyson Fury ===
Fury defeated Arslanbek Makhmudov at Tottenham Hotspur Stadium in April 2026. Entering the fight, his record is 36 wins, 2 losses and 1 draw, with 25 knockouts.

=== Anthony Joshua ===
Joshua defeated Jake Paul in December 2025 and returned in July 2026 to beat Kristian Prenga in Riyadh. His record is 30 wins and 4 losses, with 27 knockouts.

=== Negotiations and announcement ===
A deal was reached in principle for two fights, and the main stumbling block was the venue. Dana White, whose Zuffa Boxing was involved in the promotion, reportedly favoured Madison Square Garden. On 24 September 2026, the fight was announced for Cardiff on 11 December, with a "star-studded undercard" promised at a later date. The bout is co-promoted by The Ring and Zuffa Boxing.

=== Title ===
Promoter Frank Warren confirmed that the WBA had sanctioned the bout for its "Super" heavyweight title. The decision drew questions because Murat Gassiev holds the WBA's regular heavyweight title.

== Fight card ==
Weight class	Fighters			Method	Round	Time	Notes
Main card (Netflix)
Heavyweight	Tyson Fury	vs.	Anthony Joshua	–	(12)	–	For the vacant WBA (Super) heavyweight title
Heavyweight	Deontay Wilder	vs.	TBA	–	(10)	–	Wilder's original opponent, Jai Opetaia, withdrew due to a hand injury on 17 November.
Heavyweight	Martin Bakole	vs.	Solomon Adebayo	–	(10)	–	
Heavyweight	Da'Mazion Vanhouter	vs.	Michael Essomba	–	(10)	–	

== Broadcasting ==
Country/Region	Broadcaster
Worldwide	Netflix
