= 1977 United States Boxing Championships Series =

American boxing tournament

- 1977

Tournament information
- Sport: Boxing
- Location: United States
- Dates: February 13, 1977–April 14, 1977
- Established: 1977

The 1977 United States Boxing Championships Series, also known internationally as the Ring Magazine Scandal was a controversial professional boxing tournament which was organized by American boxing promoter Don King, and which involved fights that were telecast on American television network ABC. The tournament was ultimately cancelled because a duo composed of New York City writer Malcolm "Flash" Gordon and television sportscaster Alex Wallau discovered that there were many fraudulent concerns around it, including falsified boxer records and fighter rankings.

Boxing magazine The Ring was also involved, as one of their assistant editors fixed ratings at that magazine to make certain boxers look better to viewers.

== Background ==
Malcolm "Flash" Gordon was a boxing writer from Sunnyside, New York, who published a boxing zine named "Tonight's Boxing Program and Weekly Newsletter" from his apartment in Queens from the 1960s to the mid 1980s. He would handle these zines personally outside the Madison Square Garden before fight cards at the arena.

Meanwhile, 1976 had been the United States Bicentennial. 500,000 people had viewed the U.S. Capitol's bicentennial parade that year, and Americans were, generally speaking, still in a festive mood when 1977 arrived. There was a palpable sense of patriotism in the country during this era. Don King, the promoter from Cleveland, Ohio, decided to capitalize on that patriotism as well as on the success of five Americans in amateur boxing at the 1976 Summer Olympics (Sugar Ray Leonard, Leon and Michael Spinks, Howard Davis and Leo Randolph, each of whom had won gold medals) so he created the tournament.

== Tournament ==
Among the boxers who fought in the tournament was Minnesota's noted heavyweight contender, Scott LeDoux. LeDoux fought Johnny Boudreaux, an American of African descent, on February 13, 1977, at the Halsey Field House in Annapolis, Maryland. He lost by unanimous eight-rounds decision despite dropping Boudreaux in round three. Edwin Viruet, a Puerto Rican boxer, also fought as part of the tournament in the lightweight division on that program, knocking out Tommy Rose in four rounds. Two more bouts that were part of the U.S. championships took place on that program: one was a Middleweight contest, Leo Saenz vs. Casey Gacic, and the other one was a featherweight one between Richard Rozelle and Davey Vazquez.

A melee ensued after the decision was announced for the Boudreaux–LeDoux bout, where LeDoux punched Boudreaux on camera and television broadcaster Howard Cosell's hairpiece fell off. LeDoux claimed that he had been told about the fight's result beforehand and that Boudreaux was among a group of fighters managed by King, Paddy Flood and Al Braverman, who allegedly had previously assigned which fighters would win the tournament fights. The contest caused a grand jury investigation.

On March 6, 1977, bouts took place at the Marion County Institution, a jail in Marion, Ohio. That day's fights included a non-tournament bout by Puerto Rican Wilfred Benitez as well as tournament fights involving such boxers as Ruben Castillo, Stan Ward of California and others. Joe Louis, the former world heavyweight champion, was ringside and former heavyweight contender Pete Rademacher was the referee of one of the contests.

The FBI initiated an investigation soon after the February 13 show. In addition, a boxer named Kenny Weldon alleged that he had to pay $2,300 out of his purse to be allowed to participate.

Malcolm Gordon, the New York City boxing writer, meanwhile, had begun to notice that small-time boxing managers had begun to be associated with Don King, and he also noticed those managers' club fighters had begun to climb on the rankings of The Ring magazine. Alex Wallau of ABC also noticed the trend. Wallau began to worry about the quality of the boxers King was feeding ABC for their televised matches. Separately, Gordon began his own investigation into the matter.

The Ring, the prestigious boxing magazine, became involved in the scandal, because one of the magazine's then assistant editors, Johnny Ort, had been elevating boxer rankings and publishing results of fights that never took place for those boxers and then updating those boxers' fight records to reflect such non-existent bouts in order for them to be accepted into the tournament by ABC. Gordon and Wallau discovered this.

Another prominent boxer who participated at the tournament was Floyd Mayweather Sr. Future WBC world Super-Lightweight (Junior Welterweight) champion Saoul Mamby also participated; on April 2 (the same day of Ruben Castillo's semi-finals fight), he beat Mike Everett in a semi-final of the series' Super-Lightweight tournament at San Antonio, Texas by a ten-rounds unanimous decision, with Mamby allowed to compete despite being one pound over that division's weight limit of 140 pounds.

== Cancellation ==
On April 14 of 1977, ABC, which had paid $1.5 million dollars for the rights to cover the tournament on television, announced they would suspend all future broadcasts of fights included in the tournament, one day before a semi-finals card would be held in Miami, Florida, following the allegations made by Weldon and other boxers and the internal investigation led by Gordon and Wallau.

After Gordon and Wallau's evidence was presented to Roone Arledge of ABC, the United States Championship tournament was cancelled. The scandal would lead to the eventual resignation of New York State Boxing Commissioner James A. Farley Jr., who had lent his name to the championship tournament's fights.

== Aftermath ==
Malcolm "Flash" Gordon kept publishing his newsletter until the middle 1980s. He allegedly became a recluse and is suspected of having died around 2017.

Wallau went on to become a two-time Emmy Award-winning producer and director of ABC's sports coverage. He worked primarily on ABC's boxing coverage with announcer Cosell. In 1986, after Cosell's retirement, Wallau became ABC's boxing analyst. He was honored by the Boxing Writers Association of America as the top television boxing journalist in his first year.

Wallau moved into management under Bob Iger in 1993 and was named president of ABC in 2000, with oversight of 11 divisions, including Entertainment, News, Sports, Finance & Sales. In 2007, he joined the Walt Disney Company's Corporate Strategy, Business Development & Technology Group as senior strategic advisor. In 2017, he moved to the new DTCI division which created new streaming services including Disney+. He retired in 2020.

He has served on the board of directors of ESPN, the Ad Council and the Paley Center for Media. In 2006, Wallau was honored by UCLA's Jonsson Comprehensive Cancer Center with their Humanitarian Award. Wallau is a cancer survivor.

King continued to promote fights well into his 90s.

ABC's coverage of professional boxing fights continued for decades.
