= 2021 AIBA Youth World Boxing Championships =

Boxing competition

- Venue: Hala Legionów
- Location: Kielce, Poland
- Dates: 13–23 April
- Competitors: 414 from 52 nations

The 2021 AIBA Youth World Boxing Championships (21st) were held in Kielce, Poland, from 13 to 23 April 2021. The competition was held under the supervision of AIBA, the world's governing body for amateur boxing, and was open to boxers born in 2002 and 2003. It was the third time in the tournament's history that men and women have fought in the same championship. India topped the medal table with eight gold and three bronze medals.

== Schedule ==
Preliminaries
Quarterfinals
Semifinals
Final

Event	13 Apr	14 Apr	15 Apr	16 Apr	17 Apr	18 Apr	19 Apr	20 Apr	21 Apr	22 Apr	23 Apr	Total
Men
Light flyweight (–49 kg)		6			8		4	2			1	21
Flyweight (–52 kg)		12	8				4	2			1	27
Bantamweight (–56 kg)	10				8		4	2			1	25
Lightweight (–60 kg)			16			8	4	2			1	31
Light welterweight (–64 kg)		2		16	8		4	2			1	33
Welterweight (–69 kg)	4		16			8	4	2			1	35
Middleweight (–75 kg)				13		8	4	2			1	28
Light heavyweight (–81 kg)				9		8	4	2			1	24
Heavyweight (–91 kg)		8			8		4	2			1	23
Super heavyweight (+91 kg)		2		8		4		2			1	17
Women
Light flyweight (–48 kg)			3		8	4		2		1		18
Flyweight (–51 kg)		1		8			4	2		1		16
Bantamweight (–54 kg)	4		8				4	2		1		19
Featherweight (–57 kg)	2	8				4		2		1		17
Lightweight (–60 kg)	2	8				4		2		1		17
Light welterweight (–64 kg)				8			4	2		1		15
Welterweight (–69 kg)			1				4	2		1		8
Middleweight (–75 kg)					1		4	2		1		8
Light heavyweight (–81 kg)						2		2		1		5
Heavyweight (+81 kg)						4		2		1		7
Total	22	47	52	54	49	54	56	40	—	10	10	394

== Events Boxers ==
Weights	1	2	3	4	5	6	7	8	9	10
Men's	22	28	26	32	34	36	29	25	24	18
Women's	19	17	20	18	18	16	9	9	6	8

== Medal summary ==
=== Men ===
Event	Gold	Silver	Bronze
Light flyweight (–49 kg)	Sanzhar Tashkenbay; Kazakhstan	Robert Badalian; Russia	Bishwamitra Chongtham; India Nijat Huseynov; Azerbaijan
Flyweight (–52 kg)	Shakhzod Muzafarov; Uzbekistan	Evgenii Zhorov; Russia	Ruslan Tsykalo; Ukraine Enkhzorigtyn Sükhbat; Mongolia
Bantamweight (–56 kg)	Sachin Siwach; India	Yerbolat Sabyr; Kazakhstan	Michele Baldassi; Italy Alexey Shendrik; Russia
Lightweight (–60 kg)	Reito Tsutsumi; Japan	Yelnur Suyunbay; Kazakhstan	Radoslav Rosenov; Bulgaria Jhon Orobio; Colombia
Light welterweight (–64 kg)	Sabirzhan Akkalykov; Kazakhstan	Bozorboi Matyakubov; Ukraine	Ankit Narwal; India Zhantoro Tashiev; Kyrgyzstan
Welterweight (–69 kg)	Yurii Zakharieiev; Ukraine	Cheerav Ashalaev; Russia	Dany Lafos; Cuba Alokhon Abdullaev; Uzbekistan
Middleweight (–75 kg)	Mikhail Usov; Russia	Illia Tohobytskyi; Ukraine	Dias Molzhigitov; Kazakhstan William Cholov; Bulgaria
Light heavyweight (–81 kg)	Vasily Kaverin; Russia	Petar Liješević; Montenegro	Denys Salabai; Ukraine Shokhjakhon Abdullaev; Uzbekistan
Heavyweight (–91 kg)	Jorge Felimón; Cuba	Jakub Straszewski; Poland	Ramazan Dadaev; Russia Vishal Gupta; India
Super heavyweight (+91 kg)	Jakhongir Zokirov; Uzbekistan	Hovhannes Papazyan; Armenia	Levente Kiss; Hungary Fernando Arzola; Cuba

=== Women ===
Event	Gold	Silver	Bronze
Light flyweight (–48 kg)	Gitika Narwal; India	Natalia Kuczewska; Poland	Erika Prisciandaro; Italy Thipsatcha Yodwaree; Thailand
Flyweight (–51 kg)	Naorem Babyrojisana Chanu; India	Valeriia Linkova; Russia	Lucia Elen Ayari; Italy Altanbyekiin Khulan; Mongolia
Bantamweight (–54 kg)	Nigina Uktamova; Uzbekistan	Khrystyna Lakiichuk; Ukraine	Anastasiia Kirienko; Russia Karolina Ampulska; Poland
Featherweight (–57 kg)	Poonam Punia; India	Sthelyne Grosy; France	Sitora Turdibekova; Uzbekistan Panida Kawkankhun; Thailand
Lightweight (–60 kg)	Vinka; India	Zhuldyz Shayakhmetova; Kazakhstan	Veronika Gajdová; Czech Republic Dilfuza Bekova; Uzbekistan
Light welterweight (–64 kg)	Azaliia Amineva; Russia	Mokhinabonu Abdullaeva; Uzbekistan	Wiktoria Tereszczak; Poland Beatrise Rozentāle; Latvia
Welterweight (–69 kg)	Arundhati Choudhary; India	Barbara Marcinkowska; Poland	Khadichabonu Abdullaeva; Uzbekistan Zhasmin Kizatova; Kazakhstan
Middleweight (–75 kg)	Thokchom Sanamacha Chanu; India	Dana Diday; Kazakhstan	Daria Parada; Poland Sokhiba Ruzmetova; Uzbekistan
Light heavyweight (–81 kg)	Büşra Işıldar; Turkey	Kseniia Olifirenko; Russia	Martyna Jancelewicz; Poland Assel Sagatova; Kazakhstan
Heavyweight (+81 kg)	Alfiya Pathan; India	Daria Kozorez; Moldova	Oliwia Toborek; Poland Yeldana Talipova; Kazakhstan

== Medal table ==
* Host nation (Poland)

Rank	Nation	Gold	Silver	Bronze	Total
1	India	8	0	3	11
2	Russia	3	5	3	11
3	Uzbekistan	3	1	6	10
4	Kazakhstan	2	4	4	10
5	Ukraine	1	3	2	6
6	Cuba	1	0	2	3
7	Japan	1	0	0	1
7	Turkey	1	0	0	1
9	Poland*	0	3	5	8
10	Armenia	0	1	0	1
10	France	0	1	0	1
10	Moldova	0	1	0	1
10	Montenegro	0	1	0	1
14	Italy	0	0	3	3
15	Bulgaria	0	0	2	2
15	Mongolia	0	0	2	2
15	Thailand	0	0	2	2
18	Azerbaijan	0	0	1	1
18	Colombia	0	0	1	1
18	Czech Republic	0	0	1	1
18	Hungary	0	0	1	1
18	Kyrgyzstan	0	0	1	1
18	Latvia	0	0	1	1
Totals (23 entries)		20	20	40	80

== Participating nations ==
A total of 414 competitors from 52 nations (32 Europe, 11 Asia, 7 Americas, 2 Africa) participated.

- Armenia (11)
- Azerbaijan (9)
- Belarus (10)
- Bosnia and Herzegovina (2)
- Brazil (7)
- Bulgaria (7)
- Colombia (14)
- Croatia (6)
- Cuba (9)
- Czech Republic (9)
- Denmark (2)
- Ecuador (4)
- Estonia (5)
- Eswatini (1)
- Finland (6)
- France (5)
- Germany (13)
- Greece (3)
- Hungary (13)
- Iceland (1)
- India (20)
- Iran (7)
- Israel (4)
- Italy (15)
- Japan (9)
- Jordan (8)
- Kazakhstan (20)
- Kyrgyzstan (9)
- Latvia (6)
- Lithuania (8)
- Mexico (2)
- Moldova (11)
- Mongolia (8)
- Montenegro (3)
- Morocco (9)
- Nepal (2)
- Nicaragua (2)
- North Macedonia (1)
- Poland (20)
- Romania (12)
- Russia (20)
- Scotland (2)
- Serbia (4)
- Slovakia (4)
- Slovenia (1)
- Spain (9)
- Thailand (7)
- Turkey (12)
- Ukraine (19)
- United Arab Emirates (2)
- Uzbekistan (18)
- Venezuela (3)

== See also ==
- 2021 AIBA World Boxing Championships
