= Jimmy Kelly (boxer) =

British boxer

Personal information
- Born: September 1, 1992 (age 34) Manchester, England
- Height: 6 ft 0 in (183 cm)
- Weight: Light-middleweight; Middleweight

Boxing career
- Stance: Orthodox

Boxing record
- Total fights: 31
- Wins: 28
- Win by KO: 10
- Losses: 3

Jimmy Kilrain Kelly (born 1 September 1992) is a British professional boxer. He held the WBO Inter-Continental light-middleweight title and challenged for the WBO light-middleweight title in 2015.

== Amateur career ==
As an amateur, Kelly won three junior ABA titles and two national schoolboy titles. Before turning professional at 19, Kelly's amateur record stood at 70–5.

== Professional career ==
=== Light middleweight ===
==== Kelly vs. Rios ====
Kelly outpointed Martin Fidel Rios over ten rounds at the AO Arena, Manchester capturing the WBO Inter-Continental light middleweight title with a unanimous decision win with the scorecards 99–89, 100-87 and 98–89.

==== Kelly vs. Smith ====
In 2015, Kelly faced Liam Smith for the WBO light middleweight title. Kelly lost in the seventh round by TKO.

==== Kelly vs. Kostov ====
Kelly became the WBO Inter-Continental light middleweight titleholder again, knocking down Kostov in the first round and twice in the fourth where the fight was halted by TKO.

=== Middleweight ===
==== Kelly vs. Islam ====
In ProBox Promotions’ main event in Plant City, Florida, Kelly defeated middleweight contender Kanat Islam handing him his first loss despite being the underdog. Kelly captured the WBO global middleweight title with scores 95-95, 96-94 and 97–93, a majority decision.

=== Catchweight ===
==== Kelly vs. Munguía ====
Kelly faced former WBO junior middleweight champion Jaime Munguía at the Honda Center in Anaheim, California in a catchweight bout with Kelly weighing in at 164 pounds and Munguía 165. Kelly suffered three knockdowns before the referee stopped the bout in round five.

== Personal life ==
Kelly was born on 1 September 1992 in Manchester and grew up in the Wythenshawe area of the city. His middle name, Kilrain, was taken from the 1800s bare-knuckle boxer Jack Kilrain. Kelly's father, a former amateur boxer, was born in Ireland. Before every fight, Kelly takes a blade of grass from his mother's graveside and places it in his hand wraps.

== Professional boxing record ==
33 fights	30 wins	3 losses
By knockout	12	2
By decision	17	1
By disqualification	1	0

No.	Result	Record	Opponent	Type	Round, time	Date	Location	Notes
33	Win	30–3	Chaiwat Mueanphong	KO	4 (10), 2:58	28 Nov 2025	MISA Cannt Lahore, Lahore, Pakistan	Won vacant WBA Asia South super-middleweight title
32	Win	29–3	Patumong Saengarun	KO	3 (8), 0:19	10 May 2025	Quetta Polo Club, Quetta, Pakistan	
31	Win	28–3	Juan Jose Velasco	DQ	5 (10), 0:19	15 Nov 2023	Whitesands Events Center, Plant City, Florida, U.S.	
30	Win	27–3	Edward Ulloa Diaz	UD	8	22 Feb 2023	Whitesands Events Center, Plant City, Florida, U.S.	
29	Loss	26–3	Jaime Munguía	KO	5 (12) 2:57	11 Jun 2022	Honda Center, Anaheim, California, U.S.	
28	Win	26–2	Kanat Islam	MD	10	25 Feb 2022	Whitesands Events Center, Plant City, Florida, U.S.	Won vacant WBO Global middleweight title
27	Win	25–2	Harry Matthews	KO	3 (6) 0:23	12 Dec 2021	AJ Bell Stadium, Eccles, England	
26	Win	24–2	Miguel Aguilar	PTS	6	25 May 2019	Banqueting Suite at Elland Road, Leeds, England	
25	Loss	23–2	Dennis Hogan	UD	12	7 Apr 2018	Brisbane Convention & Exhibition Centre, Brisbane, Australia	Lost WBO Inter-Continental light-middleweight title; For WBO Oriental light middleweight title
24	Win	23–1	Stiliyan Kostov	TKO	4 (12)	23 Sep 2017	Manchester Arena, Manchester, England	Won vacant WBO Inter-Continental light-middleweight title
23	Win	22–1	Kevin McCauley	PTS	6	24 Jun 2017	Wythenshawe Forum, Manchester, England	
22	Win	21–1	Rick Godding	PTS	10	8 Apr 2017	Manchester Arena, Manchester, England	
21	Win	20–1	Vaidas Balciauskas	TKO	5 (6) 2:10	4 Mar 2017	Park Hall Hotel, Chorley, England	
20	Win	19–1	Darryl Sharp	PTS	10	12 Aug 2016	Village Hotel, Ashton-under-Lyne, England	
19	Win	18–1	Deividas Sajauka	PTS	6	18 Jun 2016	Guild Hall, Preston, England	
18	Win	17–1	Michael Mora	PTS	8	13 May 2016	Bolton Whites Hotel, Bolton, England	
17	Loss	16–1	Liam Smith	TKO	7 (12) 2:35	19 Dec 2015	Manchester Arena, Manchester, England	For WBO light-middleweight title
16	Win	16–0	Martin Fidel Rios	UD	10	10 Oct 2015	Manchester Arena, Manchester, England	Won vacant WBO Inter-Continental light-middleweight title
15	Win	15–0	Isaac Aryee	TKO	3 (10) 2:37	20 Jun 2015	Victoria Warehouse, Manchester, England	Won vacant WBC Youth light-middleweight title
14	Win	14–0	Nodar Robakidze	TKO	3 (10) 2:57	14 Mar 2015	Victoria Warehouse, Manchester, England	Won vacant WBC Youth Silver light-middleweight title
13	Win	13–0	Danny Shannon	KO	2 (4) 2:40	31 Jan 2015	Middleton Arena, Middleton, England	
12	Win	12–0	Dan Blackwell	PTS	6	18 Oct 2014	Victoria Warehouse, Manchester, England	
11	Win	11–0	Jason McArdle	PTS	4	13 Sep 2014	Phones 4u Arena, Manchester, England	
10	Win	10–0	Max Maxwell	PTS	6	25 Apr 2014	Wythenshawe Forum, Manchester, England	
9	Win	9–0	Ryan Toms	PTS	8	22 Nov 2013	Bowlers Exhibition Centre, Manchester, England	
8	Win	8–0	Dee Mitchell	PTS	6	20 Sep 2013	Banqueting Suite at Elland Road, Leeds, England	
7	Win	7–0	William Warbutton	PTS	8	10 May 2013	Wythenshawe Forum, Manchester, England	
6	Win	6–0	Simone Lucas	TKO	1 (6) 2:28	1 Mar 2013	Wythenshawe Forum, Manchester, England	
5	Win	5–0	Adam Jones	PTS	4	9 Dec 2012	De Vere Whites Hotel, Bolton, England	
4	Win	4–0	Jay Morris	TKO	4 (6) 1:48	22 Sep 2012	Bowlers Exhibition Centre, Manchester, England	
3	Win	3–0	Chris Jenkinson	TKO	1 (4) 2:31	2 Jun 2012	Bowlers Exhibition Centre, Manchester, England	
2	Win	2–0	Billy Smith	PTS	4	28 Apr 2012	Bowlers Exhibition Centre, Manchester, England	
1	Win	1–0	Moss Hamed	TKO	2 (6) 0:35	2 Mar 2012	Castle Leisure Centre, Bury, England	
