= Halsey Field House =

Multi-purpose arena in Annapolis, Maryland

- Halsey Field House
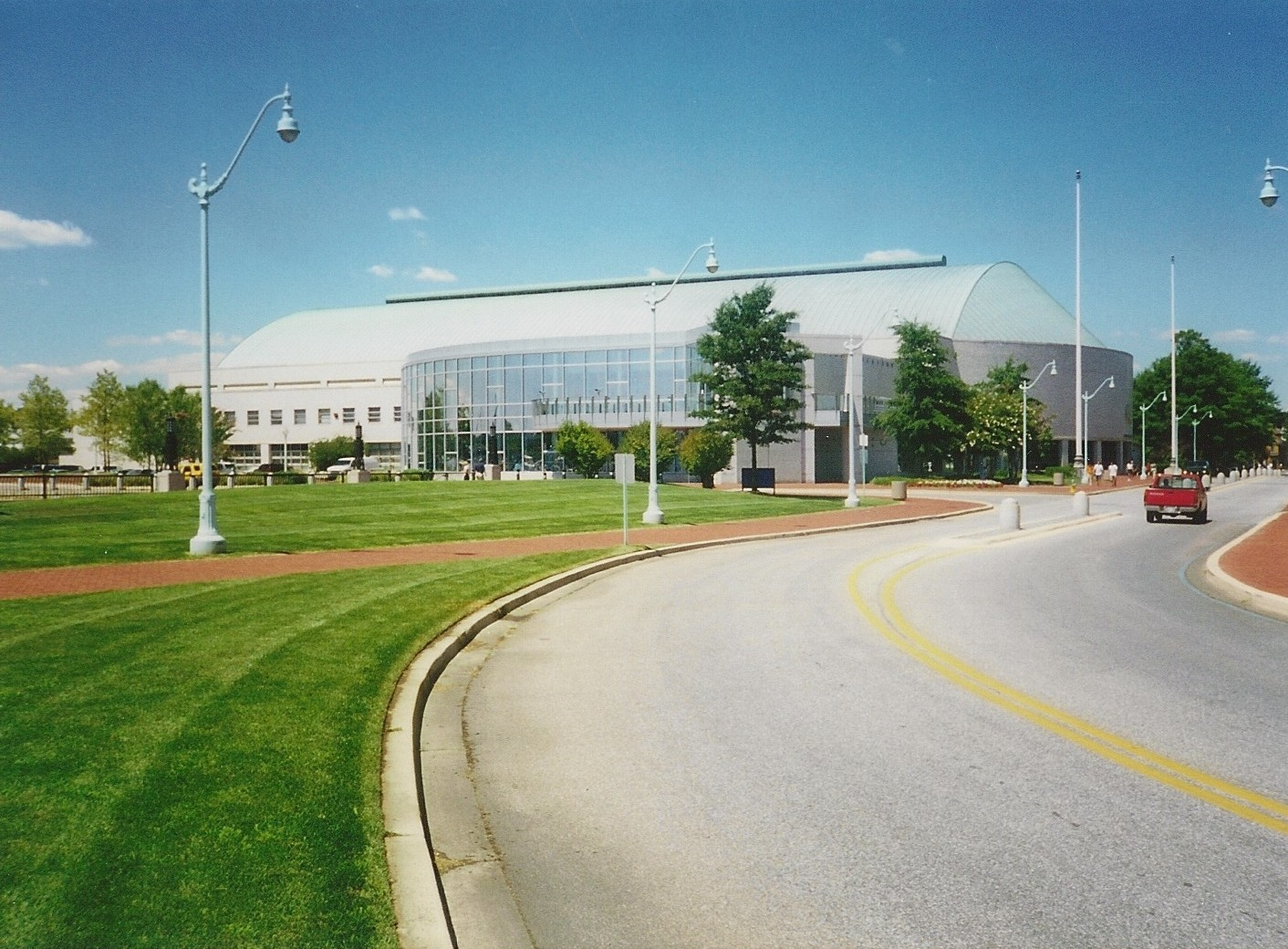
- Halsey Field House in 2002
- Interactive map of Halsey Field House
- Full name: Halsey Field House
- Location: Annapolis, Maryland
- Coordinates: 38°58′40″N 76°29′3″W
- Owner: United States Naval Academy
- Operator: United States Naval Academy
- Capacity: 5,000

Construction
- Opened: 1957

Tenant
- Navy Midshipmen men's basketball (1956-1991)

Halsey Field House is a multi-purpose arena at the United States Naval Academy, in Annapolis, Maryland, with a seating capacity of 5,000. It was home to the Navy Midshipmen men's basketball team until the Alumni Hall opened in 1991. It is named after William Halsey Jr., a World War II United States Navy fleet admiral

Currently it is the home of the indoor track and field teams. It contains a 200-meter synthetic track, squash and tennis courts, a 65 tatami dojo for Aikido/Judo, and a climbing wall.

The North Wing has five basketball courts, five squash courts, dressing rooms, a conditioning room, classrooms for physical education, athletic-gear storage, and office space for instructors.

The weight room is one of three "strength and conditioning facilities" at the academy. With 5,500 square feet (510 m^{2}), it serves men's and women's basketball, men's and women's crew, men's and women's swimming, and squash.

Some fights of the controversial 1977 United States Professional Boxing Championships Series took place at Halsey Field House on February 13, 1977, including bouts involving Scott LeDoux and Edwin Viruet.

== See also ==
- Navy Midshipmen § Facilities
- United States Naval Academy § Halls and principal buildings
