= Rafael Espinoza =

Mexican boxer (born 1994)

Personal information
- Nicknames: El Divino ("The Divine")
- Born: Rafael Espinoza Zepeda; April 21, 1994 (age 32) Guadalajara, Jalisco, Mexico
- Height: 6 ft 1 in (185 cm)
- Weight: Featherweight

Boxing career
- Reach: 74 in (188 cm)
- Stance: Orthodox

Boxing record
- Total fights: 29
- Wins: 29
- Win by KO: 25

Rafael Espinoza Zepeda (born April 21, 1994) is a Mexican professional boxer who has held the World Boxing Organization (WBO) featherweight title since December 2023.

== Professional career ==
Espinoza turned professional in 2013 and had compiled a 23–0 record by 2023. Before turning professional, he amassed only 11 amateur fights in his entire amateur career.

=== WBO Featherweight Champion ===
==== Espinoza vs. Ramírez ====
On December 9, 2023, at Charles F. Dodge City Center in Pembroke Pines, Florida, Espinoza defeated Robeisy Ramírez in a major upset by majority decision to become the new WBO featherweight champion.

==== Espinoza vs. Chirino ====
Espinoza was scheduled to make the first defense of his WBO featherweight title against Sergio Chirino on June 21, 2024, at BleauLive Theater at Fontainebleau in Las Vegas. He won the fight by TKO in the fourth round, dropping the challenger three times in the first, third and fourth rounds.

==== Espinoza vs. Ramírez 2 ====
Espinoza defeated Robeisy Ramírez by TKO after six rounds when Ramírez sustained an eye injury during a rematch at Footprint Center in Phoenix, AZ on December 7, 2024.

==== Espinoza vs. Vazquez ====
Espinoza made the third defense of his WBO featherweight title against Edward Vazquez at T-Mobile Arena in Paradise, Nevada on May 4, 2025. He defeated Vasquez by TKO in the seventh round.

==== Espinoza vs. Khegai ====
On November 15, 2025, he defeated Arnold Khegai when his opponent retired at the start of the 11th round at Arena Coliseo in San Luis Potosí.

==== Espinoza vs. Blandon ====
Espinoza fought Ricardo Blandon at Kingdom Arena in Riyadh, Saudi Arabia, on October 31, 2026, winning by technical knockout in the third round when the ringside doctor decided a cut sustained by his opponent was too severe for him to be allowed to continue the contest.

== Professional boxing record ==
29 fights	29 wins	0 losses
By knockout	25	0
By decision	4	0

No.	Result	Record	Opponent	Type	Round, time	Date	Location	Notes
29	Win	29–0	Ricardo Blandon	TKO	3 (12), 1:22	31 Oct 2026	Kingdom Arena, Riyadh, Saudi Arabia	Retained WBO featherweight title
28	Win	28–0	Arnold Khegai	RTD	11 (12), 0:15	15 Nov 2025	Arena Coliseo, San Luis Potosí, Mexico	Retained WBO featherweight title
27	Win	27–0	Edward Vazquez	TKO	7 (12), 1:47	4 May 2025	T-Mobile Arena, Paradise, Nevada, U.S.	Retained WBO featherweight title
26	Win	26–0	Robeisy Ramírez	TKO	6 (12), 2:42	7 Dec 2024	Footprint Center, Phoenix, Arizona, U.S.	Retained WBO featherweight title
25	Win	25–0	Sergio Chirino Sanchez	TKO	4 (12), 2:45	21 Jun 2024	Fontainebleau Las Vegas, Winchester, Nevada, U.S.	Retained WBO featherweight title
24	Win	24–0	Robeisy Ramírez	MD	12	9 Dec 2023	Charles F. Dodge City Center, Pembroke Pines, Florida, U.S.	Won WBO featherweight title
23	Win	23–0	Ally Mwerangi	KO	2 (10), 1:53	15 Jul 2023	Restaurante Arroyo, Mexico City, Mexico	
22	Win	22–0	Rafael Rosas Ramirez	TKO	3 (8), 1:44	25 Mar 2023	El Domo del Code Jalisco, Guadalajara, Mexico	
21	Win	21–0	Orlando Garcia Guerrero	TKO	1 (10)	19 Nov 2022	Arena Astros, Guadalajara, Mexico	
20	Win	20–0	Gerardo Valenzuela Munoz	TKO	1 (8), 2:44	25 Jun 2022	Palenque Fex, Mexicali, Mexico	
19	Win	19–0	Jose Gonzalez Ayala	KO	3 (10)	2 Apr 2022	PALCCO, Zapopan, Jalisco, Mexico	
18	Win	18–0	Alie Laurel	KO	1 (10), 1:37	19 Feb 2022	Plaza Monumental, Tijuana, Mexico	
17	Win	17–0	Aramis Solis	KO	1 (6), 0:12	25 Sep 2021	Complejo Deportivo La Inalámbrica, Merida, Mexico	
16	Win	16–0	Carlos Ornelas	UD	10	16 Jan 2021	Grand Hotel, Tijuana, Mexico	
15	Win	15–0	Luis Guzman Rios	TKO	2 (8)	27 Jun 2020	Gimnasio TV Azteca, Mexico City, Mexico	
14	Win	14–0	Diego Andrade Chavez	TKO	5 (8), 0:29	7 Jul 2018	Domo del Parque San Rafael, Guadalajara, Mexico	
13	Win	13–0	Cristian Cortes Gonzalez	TKO	6 (6)	17 Feb 2018	Domo del Parque San Rafael, Guadalajara, Mexico	
12	Win	12–0	Juan Jose Lopez Alcaraz	TKO	6 (6), 1:56	9 Dec 2017	Domo del Parque San Rafael, Guadalajara, Mexico	
11	Win	11–0	Mario Cruz	TKO	6 (8), 2:45	29 Oct 2016	Arena Coliseo, Guadalajara, Mexico	
10	Win	10–0	Jesus Marcelino Alvarez	KO	2 (6)	23 Jul 2016	Gimnasio Usos Múltiples UdeG, Guadalajara, Mexico	
9	Win	9–0	Eden Marquez	KO	1 (6)	4 Jun 2016	Gimnasio Usos Múltiples UdeG, Guadalajara, Mexico	
8	Win	8–0	Juan Jose Francisco Marquez Solano	KO	1 (6), 1:56	12 Mar 2016	Arena Jalisco, Guadalajara, Mexico	
7	Win	7–0	Karl Garcia	UD	4	30 May 2015	Florentine Gardens, Hollywood, California, U.S.	
6	Win	6–0	Agapito Garcia	KO	1 (6), 2:12	20 Mar 2015	Gimnacio Municipal de Box, Nogales, Mexico	
5	Win	5–0	Carlos Bacasegua Luzania	KO	3 (6), 2:24	7 Nov 2014	Forum del Mayo, Navojoa, Mexico	
4	Win	4–0	Victor Serrano Islas	TKO	5 (6), 2:05	11 Jul 2014	Fantasy Springs Resort Casino, Indio, California, U.S.	
3	Win	3–0	Luis Macias	TKO	2 (4)	1 Nov 2013	Auditorio Morelos, Aguascalientes, Mexico	
2	Win	2–0	Oscar Pena	UD	6	18 May 2013	Foro Polanco, Polanco, Mexico	
1	Win	1–0	Victor Valadez	TKO	3 (4)	15 Feb 2013	El Gran Mexicano, Zapopan, Mexico	

== See also ==
- List of Mexican boxing world champions
- List of world featherweight boxing champions

Sporting positions
World boxing titles
Preceded by Robeisy Ramírez	WBO featherweight champion December 9, 2023 – present	Incumbent
Awards
Previous: Jai Opetaia W 12; Mairis Briedis I	The Ring Upset of the Year; W 12 Robeisy Ramírez; 2023	Next: Bruno Surace KO6; Jaime Munguia
