= Dennis Hogan (boxer) =

Irish boxer

Personal information
- Nickname: Hurricane
- Nationality: Irish
- Born: 1 March 1985 (age 41) Kildare, Ireland
- Height: 1.73 m (5 ft 8 in)
- Weight: Light-middleweight; Middleweight; Super-middleweight

Boxing career
- Reach: 174 cm (69 in)
- Stance: Orthodox

Boxing record
- Total fights: 37
- Wins: 31
- Win by KO: 7
- Losses: 5
- Draws: 1

Dennis Hogan (born 1 March 1985) is an Irish professional boxer who is a former IBO super-welterweight World champion.

== Amateur boxing career ==
Hogan gathered an extensive amateur career of over 150 fights. He lost to the 2008 Olympic Finalist Kenny Egan in the semi-finals of the 2009 Irish Selection Tournament, 2009 and 2010 Irish Nationals. He won the All Ireland Light Heavyweight Championship.

== Professional boxing career ==
Hogan made his professional debut in a winning effort against Marlon Toby by corner retirement on 1 April 2011.

Hogan won his first professional title on 21 November 2011, beating Glen Fitzpatrick for the vacant Australian National Boxing Federation Queensland super-middleweight title by technical knockout in the fourth round.

On 5 December 2015, Hogan received his first major title opportunity facing Jack Culcay for the WBA Interim super-welterweight title losing by unanimous decision to record the first defeat of his career.

On 13 April 2019, Hogan faced Jaime Munguía for his WBO World super-welterweight title but lost by majority decision.

Hogan challenged WBC middleweight champion Jermall Charlo on 7 December 2019 at Barclays Center, Brooklyn, USA, losing by technical knockout in the seventh-round after being knocked to the canvas in rounds four and seven.

On 31 March 2021, Hogan lost to Tim Tszyu by technical knockout when his corner threw in the towel after he was floored the fifth round of the bout at Newcastle Entertainment Centre, Newcastle, New South Wales, Australia.

His three-match losing streak was finally broken on 17 November 2021, with a defeat of Tommy Browne by unanimous decision at Qudos Bank Arena, Sydney, Australia.

Hogan won the IBO super-welterweight World title with a majority decision win against defending champion Sam Eggington at the Newcastle Entertainment Centre on 8 October 2022.

He lost the title in his first defence on 20 May 2023, going down by unanimous decision to JJ Metcalf at the 3Arena in Dublin, Ireland.

In April 2024, Hogan took to social media to reveal he had taken a job as a sales representative for an electrical wholesale firm and was unlikely to return to boxing stating: "Circumstances outside my control in boxing put me on this path and unless you’ve got a big bag of cash or a great fight offer then I’ll be just focused on this."

== Personal life ==
Hogan currently lives in Newstead, Queensland, Australia.

== Professional boxing record ==
36 fights	30 wins	5 losses
By knockout	7	2
By decision	22	3
By disqualification	1	0
Draws	1	

No.	Result	Record	Opponent	Type	Round, time	Date	Location	Notes
37	Loss	31–5–1	(United Kingdom) James Metcalf	UD	12	20 May 2023	(Republic of Ireland) 3Arena, Dublin, Ireland	Lost IBO light middleweight title
36	Win	31–4–1	(United Kingdom) Sam Eggington	MD	12	8 Oct 2022	Newcastle Entertainment Centre, Newcastle, Australia	Won IBO light middleweight title
35	Win	30–4–1	(Australia) Wade Ryan	UD	12	2 Mar 2022	Brisbane Convention & Exhibition Centre, Brisbane, Australia	
34	Win	29–4–1	(Australia) Tommy Browne	UD	6	17 Nov 2021	Qudos Bank Arena, Sydney, Australia	
33	Loss	28–4–1	(Australia) Tim Tszyu	TKO	5 (10), 2:29	31 Mar 2021	Newcastle Entertainment Centre, Newcastle, Australia	For WBO Global light-middleweight title
32	Loss	28–3–1	(United States) Jermall Charlo	TKO	7 (12), 0:28	7 Dec 2019	(United States) Barclays Center, New York City, New York, U.S.	For WBC middleweight title
31	Loss	28–2–1	(Mexico) Jaime Munguía	MD	12	13 Apr 2019	Arena Monterrey, Monterrey, Mexico	For WBO light-middleweight title
30	Win	28–1–1	(Australia) Jamie Weetch	UD	12	15 Dec 2018	Brisbane Convention & Exhibition Centre, Brisbane, Australia	Retained WBO Oriental light-middleweight title; Won WBO Inter-Continental light-middleweight title
29	Win	27–1–1	(United Kingdom) Jimmy Kelly	UD	12	7 Apr 2018	Brisbane Convention & Exhibition Centre, Brisbane, Australia	Retained WBO Oriental light-middleweight title
28	Win	26–1–1	(Japan) Yuki Nonaka	UD	10	14 Oct 2017	Brisbane Convention & Exhibition Centre, Brisbane, Australia	Retained WBO Oriental light-middleweight title
27	Win	25–1–1	(Australia) Yao Yi Ma	TD	8 (12), 0:50	12 Nov 2016	Eatons Hill Hotel, Eatons Hill, Australia	Retained WBO Oriental light-middleweight title
26	Win	24–1–1	(Australia) Samuel Colomban	UD	10	10 Sep 2016	Mansfield Tavern, Mansfield, Australia	Won vacant WBO Oriental light-middleweight title
25	Win	23–1–1	(United States) Angel Hernandez	UD	6	15 Apr 2016	(United States) Grand Casino, Hinckley, Minnesota, U.S.	
24	Loss	22–1–1	(Germany) Jack Culcay	UD	12	5 Dec 2015	Inselparkhalle, Hamburg, Germany	For WBA interim light-middleweight title
23	Win	22–0–1	(United States) Kenny Abril	UD	10	26 Jun 2015	(United States) Seneca Niagara Casino & Hotel, Niagara Falls, New York, U.S.	Retained NABA-USA super light middleweight title
22	Win	21–0–1	(United States) Tyrone Brunson	UD	10	17 Apr 2015	(United States) Grand Casino, Hinckley, Minnesota, U.S.	Won vacant NABA-USA light-middleweight title
21	Win	20–0–1	(Colombia) Jose Miguel Rodriguez Berrio	DQ	4 (8), 0:51	13 Nov 2014	(United States) The Space at Westbury, Westbury, New York, U.S.	
20	Win	19–0–1	(Australia) Steve Moxon	SD	12	6 Jul 2014	Grand Star Receptions, Altona North, Australia	Won vacant WBA Oceania light-middleweight title
19	Win	18–0–1	(Australia) David Galvin	KO	6 (8), 0:37	21 May 2014	Eatons Hill Hotel, Eatons Hill, Australia	
18	Win	17–0–1	(Australia) Leroy Brown	UD	10	16 Mar 2014	Irish Club, Brisbane, Australia	Retained Australian middleweight title
17	Win	16–0–1	(Australia) Robbie Bryant	UD	10	7 Dec 2013	Kingsway Indoor Stadium, Madeley, Australia	Retained Australian middleweight title
16	Win	15–0–1	(Australia) Nathan Carroll	UD	10	7 Nov 2013	Eatons Hill Hotel, Eatons Hill, Australia	Won Australian middleweight title
15	Win	14–0–1	(Republic of Ireland) Gavin Andrew Prunty	UD	8	20 Sep 2013	Irish Club, Brisbane, Australia	
14	Win	13–0–1	(Thailand) Poomarase Yoohanngoh	KO	1 (8)	3 Aug 2013	Fortitude Stadium, Newstead, Australia	
13	Win	12–0–1	(Thailand) Sinlapakorn Silakun	TKO	2 (8), 1:45	15 Jun 2013	Fortitude Stadium, Newstead, Australia	
12	Win	11–0–1	(Thailand) Suwicha Ratidet	UD	8	14 Sep 2012	Irish Club, Brisbane, Australia	
11	Win	10–0–1	(Philippines) Arnel Tinampay	UD	8	28 Jul 2012	Gold Coast Convention Centre, Broadbeach, Australia	
10	Win	9–0–1	(Australia) Aswin Tjabui	UD	6	22 Jun 2012	Entertainment Centre, Hurstville, Australia	
9	Win	8–0–1	(Australia) Nathan Carroll	TKO	7 (8), 2:57	23 Mar 2012	Mansfield Tavern, Mansfield, Australia	Won vacant Queensland State middleweight title
8	Win	7–0–1	(Australia) David Galvin	UD	6	24 Feb 2012	Entertainment Centre, Hurstville, Australia	
7	Win	6–0–1	(Australia) Robert Clarke	UD	4	29 Oct 2011	Hervey Bay PCYC, Pialba, Australia	
6	Win	5–0–1	(Australia) Glen Fitzpatrick	TKO	4 (8), 1:58	21 Oct 2011	Broncos Leagues Club, Red Hill, Australia	Won vacant Queensland State super-middleweight title
5	Win	4–0–1	(Australia) Tass Tsitsiras	UD	4	30 Sep 2011	Fortitude Stadium, Newstead, Australia	
4	Win	3–0–1	(New Zealand) Moses Ioelu	UD	4	6 Aug 2011	Fortitude Stadium, Newstead, Australia	
3	Draw	2–0–1	(New Zealand) Edmund Eramiha	SD	5	17 Jun 2011	Grand Star Receptions, Altona North, Australia	
2	Win	2–0	(Australia) Ben Dyer	TKO	3 (4), 1:46	13 May 2011	Fortitude Stadium, Newstead, Australia	
1	Win	1–0	(Australia) Marlon Toby	RTD	2 (6), 3:00	1 Apr 2011	Fortitude Stadium, Newstead, Australia	
