= Reito Tsutsumi =

Japanese boxer (born 2002)

Reito Tsutsumi 堤麗斗
Personal information
- Born: 23 August 2002 (age 24) Narashino, Chiba, Japan
- Height: 5 ft 5 in (165 cm)
- Weight: Featherweight; Super featherweight

Boxing career
- Reach: 66 in (168 cm)
- Stance: Southpaw

Boxing record
- Total fights: 6
- Wins: 6
- Win by KO: 5
Medal record
Men's amateur boxing
Representing Japan
Youth World Championships
Gold medal – first place	2021 Kielce	Lightweight

Reito Tsutsumi (堤麗斗, Tsutsumi Reito; born 23 August 2002) is a Japanese professional boxer. As an amateur, Tsutsumi won a gold medal at the 2021 World Youth Championships as well as competing at the 2021 World Championships.

== Amateur career ==
=== World Youth Championship result ===
Kielce 2021

- Preliminaries: Defeated Daniele Salerno (Italy) RSC
- Preliminaries: Defeated Jalal Gurbanov (Azerbaijan) 5–0
- Quarter-finals: Defeated Jadier Herrera (Cuba) 5–0
- Semi-finals: Defeated Radoslav Rosenov (Bulgaria) 5–0
- Final: Defeated Yelnur Suyunbay (Kazakstan) 4–1

=== World Championship result ===
Belgrade 2021

- Second Round: Defeated by Serik Temirzhanov (Kazakhstan) 5–0

== Professional career ==
=== Early career ===
On 16 April 2025, The Ring reported that Tsutsumi had opted to turn professional, with his debut expected to be on the undercard of Ryan Garcia vs. Rolando Romero on 2 May 2025. Tsutsumi made his professional debut in a bout against Levale Whittington in Times Square, New York City, New York, USA on 2 May 2025. He was able to visibly hurt his opponent in the second and third rounds as he controlled the bout en route to a unanimous decision win.

Tsutsumi's second outing as a professional was against Michael Perez at Louis Armstrong Stadium in New York on 12 July 2025. In the opening round, Tsutsumi scored the first knockdown of his career after connecting with a right hand to the body of his opponent. Ruiz recovered from the knockdown, but was put on the canvas for a second time moments later after Tsutsumi landed a left hand to the body. In the opening minute of the second round, Tsustumi scored his third knockdown of the bout after connecting with a straight left hand to the head of Ruiz. Following this, the referee called an immediate end to the bout.

Next he stopped Javier Martinez in the first round at Allegiant Stadium in Paradise, Nevada, USA, on 13 September 2025, as part of the undercard for the undisputed super-middleweight world title fight between Canelo Álvarez and Terence Crawford.

Tsutsumi ended his first year as a professional with a fourth round technical knockout win over Leobardo Quintana Sanchez at Mohammed Abdo Arena in Riyadh, Saudi Arabia, on 27 December 2025.

In his fifth fight as a professional, Tsutsumi sent the previously undefeated Alvino Herrera Meza to the canvas twice in the opening round of their bout at Jeddah Superdome in Jeddah, Saudi Arabia, on 25 July 2026, before winning via technical knockout in the second round when the referee stopped the contest after he floored his opponent for a third time.

On 31 October 2026, he stopped Raymundo Rojas Garcia in the second round at Kingdom Arena in Riyadh, Saudi Arabia.

== Professional boxing record ==
6 fights	6 wins	0 losses
By knockout	5	0
By decision	1	0

No.	Result	Record	Opponent	Type	Round, time	Date	Location	Notes
6	Win	6–0	Raymundo Rojas Garcia	TKO	2 (10), 2:27	31 Oct 2026	Kingdom Arena, Riyadh, Saudi Arabia	
5	Win	5–0	Alvino Herrera Meza	TKO	2 (10), 0:28	25 Jul 2026	Jeddah Superdome, Jeddah, Saudi Arabia	
4	Win	4–0	Leobardo Quintana Sanchez	TKO	4 (6), 1:14	27 Dec 2025	Mohammed Abdo Arena, Riyadh, Saudi Arabia	
3	Win	3–0	Javier Martinez	TKO	1 (6), 2:18	13 Sep 2025	Allegiant Stadium, Paradise, Nevada, US	
2	Win	2–0	Michael Ruiz	TKO	2 (4), 0:28	12 Jul 2025	Louis Armstrong Stadium, New York City, New York, US	
1	Win	1–0	Levale Whittington	UD	6	2 May 2025	Times Square, New York City, New York, US	
