= Ryan Garcia vs. Rolando Romero =

2025 boxing match

Fatal Fury in Times Square
- Date: May 2, 2025
- Venue: Times Square, New York City, New York, U.S.
- Title(s) on the line: WBA (Regular) welterweight title

Tale of the tape
Boxer	Ryan Garcia	Rolando Romero
Nickname	King Ry	Rolly
Hometown	Victorville, California, U.S.	Las Vegas, Nevada, U.S.
Pre-fight record	24–1 (1) (20 KOs)	16–2 (13 KOs)
Age	26 years, 8 months	29 years, 6 months
Height	5 ft 8 1/2 in (1.74 m)	5 ft 8 in (173 cm)
Style	Orthodox	Orthodox
Recognition	Former WBC interim lightweight champion	Former WBA super lightweight champion

Result
- Romero won via UD (115–112, 118–109, 115–112)

Ryan Garcia vs. Rolando Romero, billed as Fatal Fury in Times Square (Note: The event is being named after the upcoming video game from SNK titled Fatal Fury: City of the Wolves as part of a partnership.), was a professional boxing match contested between Ryan Garcia and Rolando Romero for the vacant WBA (Regular) welterweight title. The bout took place on May 2, 2025 in Times Square, New York City, New York, U.S. Romero won by unanimous decision.

== Background ==
In January 2025, reports began to state that Ryan Garcia and Devin Haney would not be having an immediate rematch, but instead fight different opponents on the same card. Garcia–Rolando Romero and Haney–José Ramírez were the rumored bouts for May.

On February 28, Turki Alalsheikh announced that Garcia–Romero and Haney–Ramírez would take place on May 2, with Teofimo Lopez facing off Arnold Barboza Jr. Alalsheikh also announced that the event would take place in Times Square rather than a traditional arena and the first ever boxing event at the venue, in partnership with The Ring and being named after the upcoming video game Fatal Fury: City of the Wolves from SNK.

== Fight card ==
Weight Class		vs.		Method	Round	Time	Notes
Welterweight	Rolando Romero	def.	Ryan Garcia	UD	12	3:00	^{Note 1}
Welterweight	Devin Haney	def.	José Ramírez	UD	12	3:00
Light welterweight	Teofimo Lopez (c)	def.	Arnold Barboza Jr.	UD	12	3:00	^{Note 2}
Featherweight	Reito Tsutsumi	def.	Levale Whittington	UD	6	3:00	^{Note 3}

^Note 1 For vacant WBA (Regular) welterweight title
^Note 2 For WBO and The Ring light welterweight titles
^Note 3 Tsutsumi's professional debut
