= Frank Warren =

Frank or Francis Warren may refer to:

- Frank Warren (American football) (1959–2002), played for the New Orleans Saints
- Frank Warren (promoter) (born 1952), English boxing manager and promoter
- Frank Warren (racing driver) (1934–2024), NASCAR Cup Series driver
- Francis E. Warren (1844–1929), American politician, U.S. senator from Wyoming
- Francis Purcell Warren (1895–1916), British violinist, violist and composer
- Frank M. Warren Sr. (1848–1912), American businessman and millionaire
- Frank Warren, founder of the PostSecret website project

== See also ==
- Frank Warne (1906–1994), Australian cricketer
- Fran Warren (1926–2013), American singer
