= Nikita Zon =

Russian boxer

Personal information
- Nationality: Russian
- Born: Никита Олегович Зонь. 3 December 1993 (age 32) Novochunka, Russia
- Height: 6 ft 1 in (185 cm)
- Weight: Super-middleweight

Boxing career
- Stance: Southpaw

Boxing record
- Total fights: 10
- Wins: 9
- Win by KO: 7
- Draws: 1

Nikita Zon is a Russian professional boxer who currently competes in the super middleweight division.

== Professional career ==
Zons best win of his pro career to date was against fellow Russian dangerman Artysh Lopsan. Lopsan came out firing early on almost knocking down Zon in the second round. As the fight progressed Zon adapted to Lopsans style and landed the fight ending punch in the fifth, dropping Lopsan who failed to beat the count. Zon avenged the only blemish of his career by stopping unbeaten Uzbek Odiljon Aslonov in the sixth round. With the win Zon picked up his first pro belt, the WBA Asia Central Super Middleweight title

== International Boxing Association career ==
Despite formerly being unbeaten in the pro ranks Zon has suffered two defeats in International Boxing Association fights which is a mix of amateur and pro fighters. One of these defeats was against Cuban amateur Arlen Lopez. Despite Zon being the busier fighter, Lopez was on the front foot and looked the stronger man. Zon had success in the seventh and eight rounds Lopez sealed the deal, knocking down Zon three times in the ninth round and then into the ropes near the end of the tenth round forcing the referee to jump in

== Professional boxing record ==
11 fights	9 wins	1 loss
By knockout	7	0
By decision	2	1
Draws	1	
No contests	0	

No.	Result	Record	Opponent	Type	Round, time	Date	Location	Notes
11	Loss	9-1-1	Jaime Munguia	UD	12	31 Oct 2026	Kingdom Arena, Riyadh, Saudi Arabia	For WBA super-middleweight title
10	Win	9–0–1	Odiljon Aslonov	TKO	6 (10), 1:28	30 Nov 2024	RCC Boxing Academy, Ekaterinburg, Russia	
9	Win	8–0–1	Sajad Mehrabi	RTD	5 (8), 3:00	10 Feb 2024	KRK Uralets, Ekaterinburg, Russia	
8	Win	7–0–1	Artysh Lopsan	TKO	5 (10), 2:16	27 May 2023	RCC Boxing Academy, Ekaterinburg, Russia	
7	Win	6–0–1	Pavel Shelest	UD	8	28 Jan 2023	RCC Boxing Academy, Ekaterinburg, Russia	
6	Win	5–0–1	Manuk Dilanyan	TKO	3 (8), 2:14	19 Nov 2022	RCC Boxing Academy, Ekaterinburg, Russia	
5	Draw	4–0–1	Odiljon Aslinov	UD	8	6 Aug 2022	RCC Boxing Academy, Ekaterinburg, Russia	
4	Win	4–0	Ravshan Ergashev	UD	8	21 May 2022	RCC Boxing Academy, Ekaterinburg, Russia	
3	Win	3–0	Maxim Smirnov	RTD	5 (8), 3:00	29 Jan 2022	RCC Boxing Academy, Ekaterinburg, Russia	
2	Win	2–0	Sadam Elbiev	TKO	5 (6), 1:47	3 Nov 2021	Grozny, Russia	
1	Win	1–0	Yury Kolgan	TKO	3 (4), 1:47	11 Sep 2021	Ivan Yarygin Sports Palace, Krasnoyarsk, Russia	
