= Jaime Munguía =

Mexican boxer (born 1996)

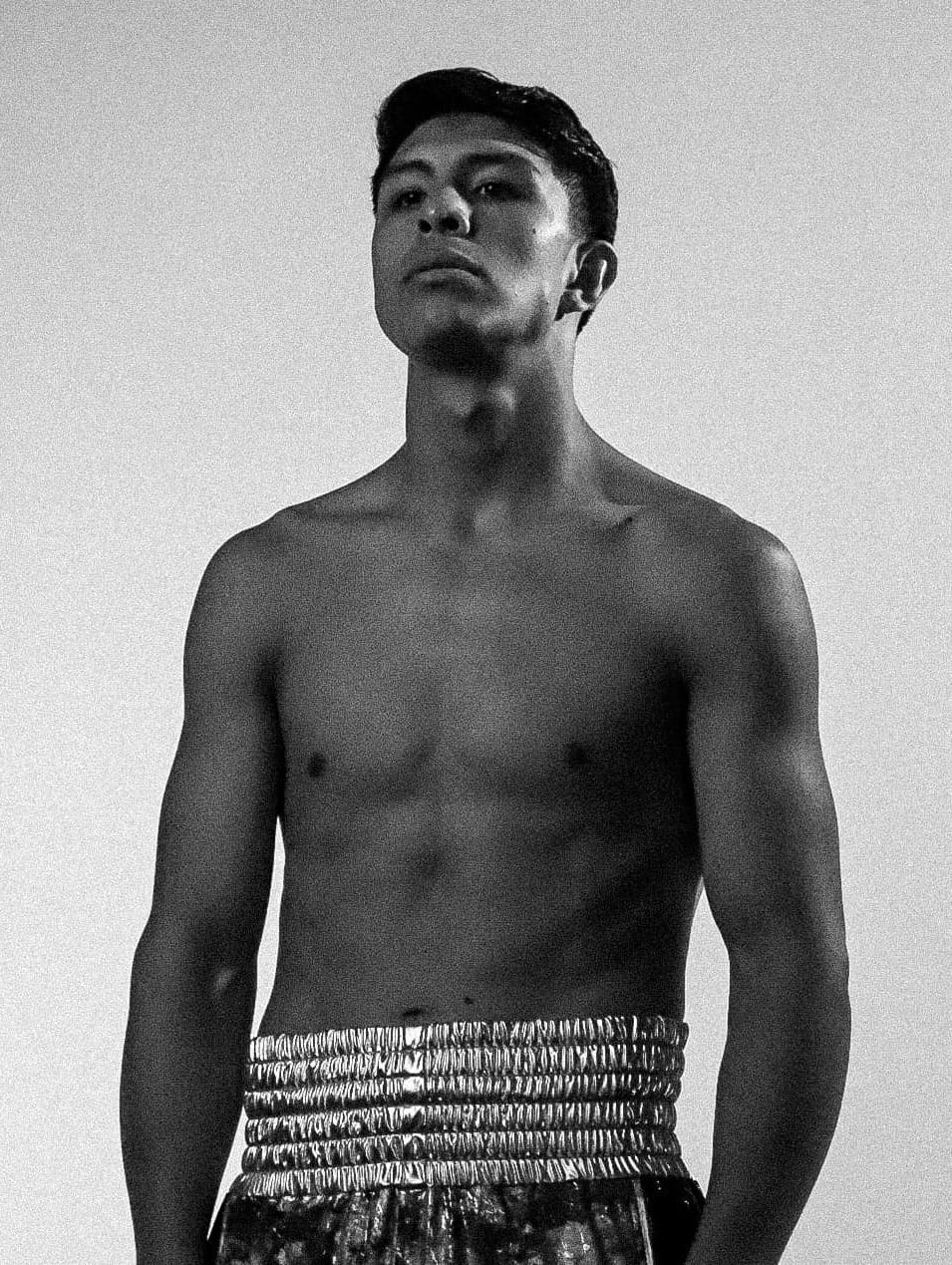

Personal information
- Born: Jaime Aarón Munguía Escobedo; 6 October 1996 (age 30) Tijuana, Baja California, Mexico
- Height: 6 ft 0 in (183 cm)
- Weight: Light middleweight; Middleweight; Super middleweight

Boxing career
- Reach: 72 in (183 cm)
- Stance: Orthodox

Boxing record
- Total fights: 49
- Wins: 47
- Win by KO: 35
- Losses: 2

Jaime Aarón Munguía Escobedo (born 6 October 1996) is a Mexican professional boxer. He is world champion in two weight classes including the World Boxing Association (WBA) super middleweight title since May 2026, and previously the World Boxing Organization (WBO) junior middleweight title from 2018 to 2019.

== Professional career ==
=== Light middleweight ===
==== Munguía vs. Ali ====
Munguía turned professional in 2013 and compiled a record of 28–0 before challenging and beating American Sadam Ali on 12 May 2018 for the WBO junior middleweight title.

==== Munguía vs. Smith ====
In his first defense on 21 July 2018, Munguía scored a unanimous decision victory over former light middleweight champion Liam Smith, with scores of 119–108, 117-110 and 116–111. Munguía had knocked Smith down in the sixth round.

==== Munguía vs. Cook ====
Munguía scored a third-round technical knockout victory against Brandon Cook on the undercard of Canelo Álvarez vs Gennady Golovkin II on 15 September 2018 for another successful defense of his world title.

==== Munguía vs. Hogan ====
On 13 April 2019, Munguía returned to defend his title against mandatory challenger Dennis Hogan. Munguía won by controversial majority decision.

==== Munguía vs. Allotey ====
Munguía made the fifth defense of his WBO light middleweight title when he defeated Patrick Allotey by fourth-round technical knockout on 14 September 2019 in Carson, California.

=== Middleweight ===
==== Munguía vs. O'Sullivan ====
Following Munguía's victory against Patrick Allotey, he vacated his WBO light middleweight title as he moved up to middleweight to face Gary O'Sullivan on 11 January 2020. Munguía won his middleweight debut via eleventh-round technical knockout.

==== Munguía vs. Johnson ====
In his second bout at middleweight, Munguía faced Tureano Johnson on 30 October 2020. In the sixth round of the fight, Munguía landed a right uppercut which caused a nasty gash in Johnson's lip. This caused a doctor's stoppage, giving Munguía the victory and the WBO Inter-Continental middleweight title. After the fight, he made clear his desire to win a world title at middleweight, saying "I want any of the 160-pound champs. Any [of them] would be great for me."

==== Munguía vs. Szeremeta ====
On 19 June 2021, Munguía faced former world title challenger Kamil Szeremeta who had taken the fight on short notice. Munguía won the fight via sixth-round corner retirement. Now ranked number 1 by the WBC and WBO, he said, "I would like to [fight for a world title] by the end of the year. If not, a battle between Mexico and Puerto Rico with Gabriel Rosado [who had knocked out Bektemir Melikuziev on the undercard], he looked really good tonight."

==== Munguía vs. Rosado ====
Munguía was scheduled to make his first WBO Inter-Continental middleweight title defense against the 41-fight veteran Gabriel Rosado on 13 November 2021, at the Honda Center in Anaheim, California. Munguía entered the fight as the significant betting favorite, with most odds-makers having him -700 or -750 betting favorite. Munguía won the fight by unanimous decision, with scores of 118–110, 119-109 and 117–111. He landed 328 total punches to Rosado's 154, and successfully connected with 50% of his power shots.

==== Munguía vs. Kelly ====
Munguía faced Jimmy Kelly at the Honda Center in Anaheim, California scoring three knockdowns before the referee stopped the bout in round five. At the immediate post-fight interview, Munguía called out Jermall Charlo seeking a world title.

=== Super middleweight ===
==== Munguía vs. Ryder ====
Munguía was scheduled to face Briton John Ryder in a super middleweight bout, on 27 January 2024, in the Footprint Center, in Phoenix, Arizona. He won the fight by TKO in the ninth round.

==== Munguía vs. Álvarez ====
On 27 February 2024, it was reported that Munguía would challenge Canelo Álvarez for the undisputed super middleweight titles on 4 May in Las Vegas. The fight was confirmed on 12 March 2024. Álvarez dropped Munguía for the first time in his career in the fourth round. Álvarez won the fight by unanimous decision (117–110, 116–111, 115–112).

==== Munguia vs. Bazinyan ====
Munguia was scheduled to face Erik Bazinyan in a super middleweight bout at Desert Diamond Arena in Glendale, Arizona, on 20 September 2024. He won the fight by TKO in the 10th round.

==== Munguia vs. Surace ====
In September 2024, it was reported that Munguia would face Ronald Gavril on 14 December 2024 in Tijuana, Mexico. On 8 November 2024, it was announced that Munguia was instead scheduled to face Bruno Surace. In a major upset, Munguia lost the fight by KO in the 6th round.

==== Munguia vs. Surace II ====
In February 2025 it was reported that Munguia was "finalizing a deal" to face Bruno Surace in a rematch at anb Arena in Riyadh, Saudi Arabia on 4 May 2025. The bout occurred on 4 May 2025 with Munguia winning by unanimous decision. Shortly after the bout, Munguia tested positive for performance-enhancing drugs; his b-sample also came back with a positive result. The investigation is still ongoing for potential disciplinary actions.

==== Munguia vs. Resendiz ====
On 10 November 2025, Ring Magazine reported that Munguia was in negotiations to fight interim WBC champion Christian Mbilli (29–0–1, 24 KOs) in the first quarter of 2026. Following their draw on 13 September, an immediate rematch was ordered for Mbilli to fight Lester Martinez. Mbilli's promoter, Camille Estephan, stated that the plan was to fight Munguia before returning to the rematch with Martinez. In March 2026, it was announced that Munguia would challenge Armando Reséndiz for the WBA super middleweight title on 2 May 2026, at T-Mobile Arena in Las Vegas. Munguía won by unanimous decision.

==== Munguia vs. Zon ====
Munguía made a successful first defense of his title with a unanimous decision win over Nikita Zon at Kingdom Arena in Riyadh, Saudi Arabia, on 31 October 2026.

== Professional boxing record ==
49 fights	47 wins	2 losses
By knockout	35	1
By decision	12	1

No.	Result	Record	Opponent	Type	Round, time	Date	Location	Notes
49	Win	47–2	Nikita Zon	UD	12	31 Oct 2026	Kingdom Arena, Riyadh, Saudi Arabia	Retained WBA super-middleweight title
48	Win	46–2	Armando Reséndiz	UD	12	2 May 2026	T-Mobile Arena, Paradise, Nevada, U.S.	Won WBA super-middleweight title
47	Win	45–2	Bruno Surace	UD	12	3 May 2025	anb Arena, Riyadh, Saudi Arabia	Tested positive for exogenous testosterone metabolites in a VADA
46	Loss	44–2	Bruno Surace	KO	6 (10), 2:36	14 Dec 2024	Estadio Caliente, Tijuana, Mexico	
45	Win	44–1	Erik Bazinyan	KO	10 (12), 2:36	20 Sep 2024	Desert Diamond Arena, Glendale, Arizona, U.S.	
44	Loss	43–1	Canelo Álvarez	UD	12	4 May 2024	T-Mobile Arena, Paradise, Nevada, U.S.	For WBA (Super), WBC, IBF, WBO, and The Ring super-middleweight titles
43	Win	43–0	John Ryder	TKO	9 (12), 1:25	27 Jan 2024	Footprint Center, Phoenix, Arizona, U.S.	Retained WBC Silver super-middleweight title
42	Win	42–0	Sergiy Derevyanchenko	UD	12	10 Jun 2023	Toyota Arena, Ontario, California, U.S.	Won vacant WBC Silver super-middleweight title
41	Win	41–0	Gonzalo Gaston Coria	KO	3 (10) 2:32	19 Nov 2022	Arena Astros, Guadalajara, Mexico	
40	Win	40–0	Jimmy Kelly	KO	5 (12) 2:57	11 Jun 2022	Honda Center, Anaheim, California, U.S.	
39	Win	39–0	D'Mitrius Ballard	TKO	3 (12), 1:48	19 Feb 2022	Bullring by the Sea, Tijuana, Mexico	Retained WBO Inter-Continental middleweight title
38	Win	38–0	Gabriel Rosado	UD	12	13 Nov 2021	Honda Center, Anaheim, California, U.S.	Retained WBO Inter-Continental middleweight title
37	Win	37–0	Kamil Szeremeta	RTD	6 (12), 3:00	19 Jun 2021	Don Haskins Center, El Paso, Texas, U.S.	Retained WBO Inter-Continental middleweight title
36	Win	36–0	Tureano Johnson	RTD	6 (12), 3:00	30 Oct 2020	Fantasy Springs Resort Casino, Indio, California, U.S.	Won vacant WBO Inter-Continental middleweight title
35	Win	35–0	Gary O'Sullivan	TKO	11 (12), 2:17	11 Jan 2020	Alamodome, San Antonio, Texas, U.S.	
34	Win	34–0	Patrick Allotey	KO	4 (12), 2:18	14 Sep 2019	Dignity Health Sports Park, Carson, California, U.S.	Retained WBO light-middleweight title
33	Win	33–0	Dennis Hogan	MD	12	13 Apr 2019	Arena Monterrey, Monterrey, Mexico	Retained WBO light-middleweight title
32	Win	32–0	Takeshi Inoue	UD	12	26 Jan 2019	Toyota Center, Houston, Texas, U.S.	Retained WBO light-middleweight title
31	Win	31–0	Brandon Cook	TKO	3 (12), 1:03	15 Sep 2018	T-Mobile Arena, Paradise, Nevada, U.S.	Retained WBO light-middleweight title
30	Win	30–0	Liam Smith	UD	12	21 Jul 2018	The Joint, Paradise, Nevada, U.S.	Retained WBO light-middleweight title
29	Win	29–0	Sadam Ali	TKO	4 (12), 1:02	12 May 2018	Turning Stone Resort Casino, Verona, New York, U.S.	Won WBO light-middleweight title
28	Win	28–0	Johnny Navarrete	KO	3 (10), 1:12	17 Mar 2018	Arena José Sulaimán, Monterrey, Mexico	
27	Win	27–0	Jose Carlos Paz	KO	3 (10), 2:19	10 Feb 2018	Grand Oasis Resort, Cancún, Mexico	Won vacant WBC Latino light-middleweight title
26	Win	26–0	Paul Valenzuela Jr	TKO	2 (8), 2:58	9 Dec 2017	Mandalay Bay Events Center, Paradise, Nevada, U.S.	
25	Win	25–0	Uriel Gonzalez	KO	2 (8), 0:01	2 Sep 2017	Gimnasio Manuel Bernardo Aguirre, Chihuahua City, Mexico	
24	Win	24–0	Miguel Angel Lopez	KO	3 (10), 2:33	1 Jul 2017	Grand Hotel, Tijuana, Mexico	
23	Win	23–0	Johnny Navarrete	UD	10	29 Apr 2017	Gimnasio Manuel Bernardo Aguirre, Chihuahua City, Mexico	
22	Win	22–0	Gabriel Agramon	RTD	2 (4), 3:00	1 Apr 2017	Auditorio Fausto Gutierrez Moreno, Tijuana, Mexico	
21	Win	21–0	Jorge Juarez	TKO	1 (8), 1:49	24 Mar 2017	Auditorio Municipal, Las Rosas, Mexico	
20	Win	20–0	Juan Macias Montiel	KO	2 (10), 2:38	2 Feb 2017	Auditorio Pablo Colin, Cuautitlán Izcalli, Mexico	
19	Win	19–0	Álvaro Robles	TKO	5 (10), 1:04	10 Dec 2016	Arena Monterrey, Monterrey, Mexico	
18	Win	18–0	Alfredo Chavez	TKO	1 (8), 0:30	22 Oct 2016	Auditorio Fausto Gutierrez Moreno, Tijuana, Mexico	
17	Win	17–0	Ramiro Alcaraz	KO	3 (8), 2:55	13 Aug 2016	Baja California Center, Tijuana, Mexico	
16	Win	16–0	Oscar Mora	KO	2 (8), 3:00	30 Jul 2016	Auditorio Fausto Gutierrez Moreno, Tijuana, Mexico	
15	Win	15–0	Seth Carrillo	KO	2 (8), 2:59	18 Jun 2016	Auditorio Fausto Gutierrez Moreno, Tijuana, Mexico	
14	Win	14–0	Elliot Cano	TKO	5 (8), 1:23	30 Apr 2016	Malecon Turistico, Guaymas, Mexico	
13	Win	13–0	Frank Verduzco	TKO	1 (8), 1:58	23 Jan 2016	Palenque Fex, Mexicali, Mexico	
12	Win	12–0	Gabriel Agramon	TKO	6 (8), 1:45	5 Dec 2015	Gimnasio Municipal Gustavo Díaz Ordaz, Tecate, Mexico	
11	Win	11–0	Jose Maria Valdez	TKO	2 (6), 2:59	10 Jul 2015	Campo Nuevo Ensenada, Ensenada, Mexico	
10	Win	10–0	Julio Nario	KO	4 (8), 2:57	14 Mar 2015	Auditorio Fausto Gutierrez Moreno, Tijuana, Mexico	
9	Win	9–0	Alan Zavala	UD	6	10 Jan 2015	Auditorio Fausto Gutierrez Moreno, Tijuana, Mexico	
8	Win	8–0	Jose Maria Valdez	UD	4	20 Sep 2014	Auditorio Fausto Gutierrez Moreno, Tijuana, Mexico	
7	Win	7–0	Jose Arteaga	UD	4	27 Jun 2014	Hipódromo Caliente, Arena Tecate, Tijuana, Mexico	
6	Win	6–0	Gerardo Mendoza	TKO	2 (4), 0:37	28 Feb 2014	Forum Tecate, Tijuana, Mexico	
5	Win	5–0	Juan Velasquez	TKO	2 (4), 0:55	11 Jan 2014	Casino Hipodromo Agua Caliente, Tijuana, Mexico	
4	Win	4–0	Abraham Marquez	TKO	1 (4), 2:13	22 Nov 2013	Forum Tecate, Tijuana, Mexico	
3	Win	3–0	Benjamin Urias	RTD	3 (4), 3:00	26 Oct 2013	Caliente Racetrack, Tijuana, Mexico	
2	Win	2–0	Luis Contreras	TKO	2 (4), 0:08	23 Aug 2013	Forum Tecate, Tijuana, Mexico	
1	Win	1–0	Manuel Mora	TKO	2 (4), 2:28	13 Jul 2013	Forum Tecate, Tijuana, Mexico	

== Titles in boxing ==
=== Major world titles ===
- WBO light-middleweight champion (154 lbs)
- WBA super-middleweight champion (168 lbs)

=== Regional/International titles ===
- WBC Latino light-middleweight champion (154 lbs)
- WBO Inter-Continental middleweight champion (160 lbs)
- WBC Silver super middleweight title (168 lbs)

== See also ==
- List of male boxers
- List of Mexican boxing world champions
- List of world light-middleweight boxing champions
- List of world super-middleweight boxing champions

Sporting positions
Regional boxing titles
Vacant Title last held by Isaac Real	WBC Latino light-middleweight champion 10 February 2018 – 2018; Vacated	Vacant Title next held by Jorge Fortea
Vacant Title last held by Liam Williams	WBO Inter-Continental middleweight champion 30 October 2020 – 2022; Vacated	Vacant Title next held by Etinosa Oliha
Vacant Title last held by Ali Akhmedov	WBC Silver super middleweight champion 10 June 2023 – 4 May 2024; Lost bid for world title	Vacant Title next held by Maciej Sulęcki
World boxing titles
Preceded by Sadam Ali	WBO light-middleweight champion 12 May 2018 – 23 November 2019; Vacated	Succeeded by Patrick Teixeira; Interim champion promoted
Preceded by Armando Reséndiz	WBA super-middleweight champion 2 May 2026 – present	Incumbent
Awards
Previous: Erickson Lubin	The Ring Prospect of the Year; 2017	Succeeded by Teofimo Lopez
Previous: Leigh Wood vs. Michael Conlan	BWAA Fight of the Year vs. Sergiy Derevyanchenko; 2023	Next: Tyson Fury vs. Oleksandr Usyk I
