= Bruno Surace =

French boxer (born 1998)

Personal information
- Nickname: Brunello
- Nationality: French
- Born: Bruno Surace; July 28, 1998 (age 28) Marseille, France
- Height: 1.83 m (6 ft 0 in)
- Weight: Super middleweight; Middleweight; Super welterweight

Boxing career
- Stance: Orthodox

Boxing record
- Total fights: 30
- Wins: 27
- Win by KO: 5
- Losses: 1
- Draws: 2
- No contests: 0
Medal record
Men's amateur boxing
French Junior National Championships
| Silver medal – second place | 2013 Berck-sur-Mer | Bantamweight |
French Youth National Championships
| Bronze medal – third place | 2015 Ohlain | Light-welterweight |

Bruno Surace (born 28 July 1998) is a French professional boxer who recently held the EBU Silver Middleweight title and is most known for scoring an upset knockout win over Jaime Munguía.

== Professional career ==
=== Super welterweight ===
On 28 October 2016, Surace faced fellow debutant Mathis Lourenco at Salle jean Vilain in Fréjus, France, their bout ended in majority draw, with one judge favoring the opposition 39–37 and the rest scoring 38–38. A few weeks after, Surace fought Kamel Jemli and won on points.

=== Middleweight ===
After composing a record of 8–0–2 with no knockout win whatsoever, he faced 15–9–1 veteran compatriot Charden Ansoula on 1 December 2018 in Salle Roger Maillaud, making his way for his middleweight debut. Surace unexpectedly won via first-round TKO.

==== French middleweight champion ====
On 23 January 2021, Surace fought for the vacant French middleweight title against fellow French contender Diego Natchoo in Charleville-Mézières, Grand Est, Surace officially became the French middleweight champion winning via unanimous decision. On 29 May 2021, he successfully defended his national title against Mehdi Madani via unanimous decision.

==== EBU Silver middleweight champion ====
On 16 December 2023, Surace faced undefeated Spanish contender Jhon Jader Obregon for the inaugural European Boxing Union (EBU) Silver middleweight title in the Aix-En-Provence Arena, Surace scored his fourth knockout win in 25 fights, stopping the Spanish foe in the last round.

=== Super middleweight ===
==== Surace vs. Munguía ====
In September 2024, it was reported that Jaime Munguía would face Ronald Gavril on 14 December 2024 in Tijuana, Mexico. On 8 November 2024, it was announced that Surace would replace Gavril. With Surace coming off a near one-year lay off, weaker résumé than the opposition and few knockout wins, few believed a triumphant bout for Surace, let alone a knockout win, was possible. This also served the first bout of Surace outside of France. Munguia was troubling Surace the whole fight, even scoring a knockdown in the second round, until in the sixth round, as Munguia seemed like he was heading for an impressive finish, Surace landed a right hand upstairs that unexpectedly dropped the former junior middleweight champion, Munguia tried to rise off, however, he was counted out.

==== Surace vs. Munguía II ====
On 19 December 2024, it was reported that Munguia activated his rematch clause. In January 2025, it was announced that Surace would be having his rematch with Jaime Munguía on April 12 in Tijuana. In February 2025 it was reported that Munguia was "finalizing a deal" to face Bruno Surace in a rematch in Riyadh, Saudi Arabia on 4 May 2025. The bout occurred on 4 May 2025 with Munguia winning by unanimous decision. Shortly after the bout, Munguia tested positive for performance-enhancing drugs; his b-sample also came back with a positive result. The investigation is still ongoing for potential disciplinary actions.

== Professional boxing record ==
| 30 fights | 27 wins | 1 loss |
|---|---|---|
| By knockout | 5 | 0 |
| By decision | 22 | 1 |
| Draws | 2 | |

| No. | Result | Record | Opponent | Type | Round, time | Date | Location | Notes |
|---|---|---|---|---|---|---|---|---|
| 30 | Win | 27–1–2 | Kamil Bednarek | UD | 10 | 14 Nov 2026 | The Venue Riyadh Season, Riyadh, Saudi Arabia | |
| 29 | Loss | 26–1–2 | Jaime Munguía | UD | 12 | 3 May 2025 | anb Arena, Riyadh, Saudi Arabia | |
| 28 | Win | 26–0–2 | Jaime Munguía | KO | 6 (10), 2:36 | 14 Dec 2024 | Estadio Caliente, Tijuana, Mexico | |
| 27 | Win | 25–0–2 | Jhon Jader Obregón | TKO | 12 (12), 2:00 | 16 Dec 2023 | Arena, Aix-en-Provence, France | Won inaugural European Silver middleweight title |
| 26 | Win | 24–0–2 | Miloš Janković | UD | 8 | 19 May 2023 | Salle du casino, Hyères, France | |
| 25 | Win | 23–0–2 | Giorgi Umekashvili | UD | 6 | 17 Dec 2022 | Hall Nelson Mandela, Venelles, France | |
| 24 | Win | 22–0–2 | Baptiste Castegnaro | PTS | 6 | 19 Nov 2022 | Salle des Sports, Marseille, France | |
| 23 | Win | 21–0–2 | Victor Garcia | UD | 8 | 12 Feb 2022 | Forum du Casino, Hyères, France | |
| 22 | Win | 20–0–2 | Artem Karasev | UD | 6 | 18 Dec 2021 | Hall Nelson Mandela, Venelles, France | |
| 21 | Win | 19–0–2 | Nodar Robakidze | PTS | 6 | 2 Jul 2021 | Restaurant U Nichjaretu, Calvi, France | |
| 20 | Win | 18–0–2 | Mehdi Madani | UD | 10 | 29 May 2021 | Salle l'Albanais, Rumilly, France | Retained French middleweight title |
| 19 | Win | 17–0–2 | Diego Natchoo | UD | 10 | 23 Jan 2021 | Gymnase Robert Hemmler, Charleville-Mézières, France | Won vacant French middleweight title |
| 18 | Win | 16–0–2 | Patrick Momene Mokamba | UD | 6 | 10 Oct 2020 | Accor Hotel Arena, Paris, France | |
| 17 | Win | 15–0–2 | Giorgi Khutsishvili | KO | 6 (6) | 28 Dec 2019 | Palais des Sports, Marseille, France | |
| 16 | Win | 14–0–2 | Antonio Di Mario | RTD | 2 (6), 3:00 | 23 Nov 2019 | Salle la Soucoupe, Saint-Nazaire, France | |
| 15 | Win | 13–0–2 | Mikael Mathieu | UD | 6 | 28 Sep 2019 | Arena, Aix-en-Provence, France | |
| 14 | Win | 12–0–2 | Martin Owono | MD | 8 | 22 Jun 2019 | Hall Nelson Mandela, Venelles, France | |
| 13 | Win | 11–0–2 | Willy Borrel | PTS | 6 | 20 Apr 2019 | Salle Dubois-Crance, Charleville-Mézières, France | |
| 12 | Win | 10–0–2 | Vincent Galazzo | UD | 6 | 22 Dec 2018 | Hall Nelson Mandela, Venelles, France | |
| 11 | Win | 9–0–2 | Charden Ansoula | TKO | 1 (8) | 1 Dec 2018 | Salle Roger Maillaud, Nouzonville, France | |
| 10 | Win | 8–0–2 | Guillaume La Selva | UD | 6 | 3 Nov 2018 | Complexe de la Busserine, Marseille, France | |
| 9 | Win | 7–0–2 | Kelvin Arevalo | UD | 6 | 10 Mar 2018 | Salle René-Tys, Reims, France | |
| 8 | Win | 6–0–2 | Enzo Scotto | MD | 6 | 18 Nov 2017 | Salle Louison Bobet, Aix-en-Provence, France | |
| 7 | Win | 5–0–2 | Dzianis Yahoranka | UD | 6 | 28 Oct 2017 | Salle Polyvalente de Mon Idée, Auvillers-les-Forges, France | |
| 6 | Win | 4–0–2 | Romain Péron | PTS | 6 | 1 Jul 2017 | Salle Bayard, Charleville-Mézières, France | |
| 5 | Draw | 3–0–2 | Jimmy Wailly | MD | 6 | 1 Apr 2017 | Salle Georges Carpentier, Béthune, France | |
| 4 | Win | 3–0–1 | Slađan Dragišić | PTS | 4 | 25 Feb 2017 | Gymnase Fréderique Bronquart, Tinqueux, France | |
| 3 | Win | 2–0–1 | Predrag Cvetković | PTS | 4 | 10 Dec 2016 | Maison des Sports, Bazeilles, France | |
| 2 | Win | 1–0–1 | Kamel Jemli | PTS | 4 | 18 Nov 2016 | Gymnase de la Martine, Marseille, France | |
| 1 | Draw | 0–0–1 | Mathis Lourenco | MD | 4 | 28 Oct 2016 | Salle jean Vilain, Fréjus, France | |
