= Alex Wallau =

American boxing commentator (1945–2025)

Alex Wallau (January 11, 1945 – October 10, 2025) was an American boxing commentator who was president of the ABC television network.

== Life and career ==
Wallau began his career with ABC in 1976, when he joined the network's Sports division under Roone Arledge, then head of ABC Sports. Wallau went on to become a two-time Emmy Award-winning producer and director of ABC's sports coverage. He worked primarily on ABC's boxing coverage with announcer Howard Cosell. In 1986, after Cosell's retirement, Wallau became ABC's boxing analyst. He was honored by the Boxing Writers Association of America as the top television boxing journalist in his first year.

Wallau moved into management under Bob Iger in 1993 and was named President of ABC in 2000, with oversight of 11 divisions, including Entertainment, News, Sports, Finance, and Sales. In 2007, he joined The Walt Disney Company's Corporate Strategy, Business Development & Technology Group as Senior Strategic Advisor. In 2017, he moved to the new DTCI division which created new streaming services including Disney+. He retired in 2020.

He served on the Board of Directors of ESPN, the Ad Council, and the Paley Center for Media. In 2006, Wallau was honored by UCLA's Jonsson Comprehensive Cancer Center with their Humanitarian Award. Wallau was a cancer survivor.

Wallau died on October 10, 2025, at the age of 80.

== See also ==
- 1977 United States Boxing Championships Series
