= Roone Arledge =

American sports and news broadcasting executive (1931–2002)

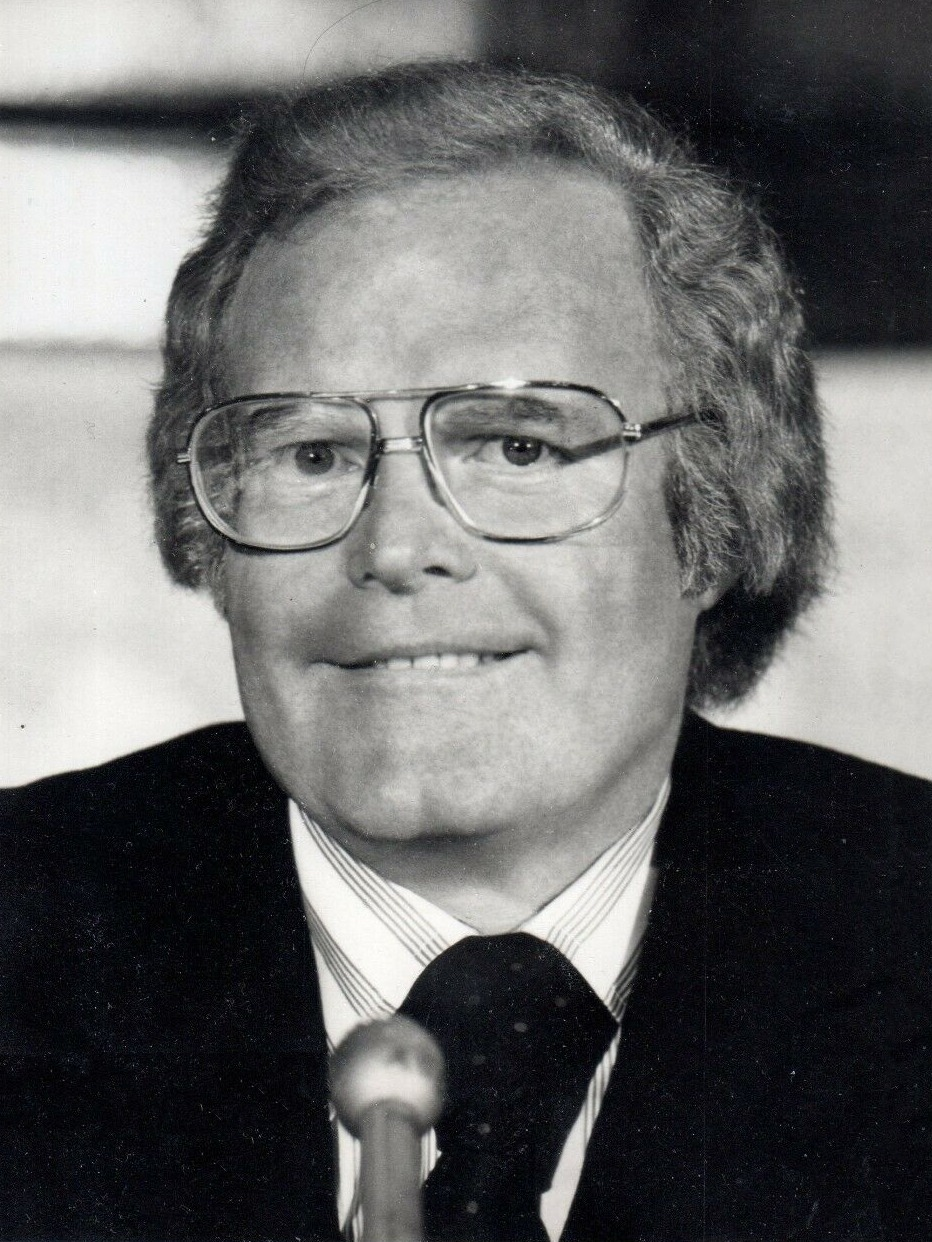
- Arledge in 1978
- Born: Roone Pinckney Arledge Jr. July 8, 1931; Queens, New York, U.S.
- Died: December 5, 2002 (aged 71); New York City, U.S.
- Resting place: Sacred Hearts of Jesus & Mary R.C. Cemetery, Southampton, New York
- Education: Columbia University (BA)

Roone Pinckney Arledge Jr. (July 8, 1931 – December 5, 2002) was an American sports and news broadcasting executive who was president of ABC Sports from 1968 until 1986 and ABC News from 1977 until 1998, and a key part of the company's rise to competition with the two other main television networks, NBC and CBS, in the 1960s, '70s, '80s and '90s. He created many programs still airing today, such as Monday Night Football, ABC World News Tonight, Nightline and 20/20.

== Early life ==
Arledge was born in Forest Hills, Queens, New York City, the son of Gertrude (Stritmater) and Roone Pinckney Arledge, an attorney. Arledge grew up in Merrick and attended Wellington C. Mepham High School on Long Island where he wrestled and played baseball. Although Arledge was not a stand out wrestler, Mepham was the most premier wrestling school in the country at the time.

Upon graduation, he decided that sportswriting was what he wanted to do in life, and applied to Columbia University. There, he discovered that Columbia's journalism program was a graduate program, not an undergraduate one. Even so, Arledge liked what he saw and enrolled in a liberal-arts program. He also served as President of the Omega chapter of the fraternity of Phi Gamma Delta. His classmates included Max Frankel, who would eventually win a Pulitzer Prize in 1973 for his work as editorial page editor of the New York Times; Larry Grossman, who became president of the Public Broadcasting Service in 1976 and later went on to head NBC News; and Richard Wald, another president of NBC News that Arledge would later persuade to come over to ABC News as a senior vice-president. He was the only one of the four who did not work at the Columbia Daily Spectator, the daily student newspaper of Columbia University.

After receiving a bachelor's degree in 1952, Arledge enrolled in graduate studies at Columbia's School of International and Public Affairs. Restless with graduate studies, he went looking for a job where he could use his college degree and obtained an entry-level job at the DuMont Television Network. Military service intervened, and after Arledge's discharge, he learned the network had folded and he had no job to return to.

== Personal life ==
Arledge was married three times. He wed Gigi Shaw in 1994. He is survived by her and his four children from his first marriage, Roone, Elizabeth, Susan Weston and Patricia Loonie. His previous spouses were Joan Heise and Ann Fowler.

== Career ==
Contacts he made at DuMont paid off with a stage manager's job at NBC's New York City station, WRCA (later WNBC). One of his assignments there was to help produce a children's puppet show hosted by Shari Lewis. In 1958, the program won a New York City Emmy award.

Even with that success, Arledge wanted to tinker with programming ideas. Using the avant-garde magazine Playboy as his model, Arledge convinced his superiors at WRCA to let him film a pilot of a show he called For Men Only. While his superiors liked the pilot, they told him WRCA could not find a place in the programming schedule for it. But the WRCA weatherman, Pat Hernon, who hosted the pilot episode of For Men Only, began showing the kinescope to people around New York City who might want the program. One of them was a former account executive at the ad agency Dancer Fitzgerald Sample, Edgar J. Scherick, who as far as Hernon knew, was doing something at ABC.

=== Assistant producer ===
Scherick had joined the fledgling ABC television network when he persuaded it to purchase Sports Programs, Inc. Scherick had formed this company after leaving CBS when the network would not make him the head of sports programming, choosing instead Bill MacPhail, a former baseball public-relations agent. Before ABC Sports even became a formal division of the network, Scherick and ABC programming chief Tom Moore pulled off many programming deals involving the most popular American sporting events.

While Scherick wasn't interested in "For Men Only," he recognized the talent Arledge had. Arledge realized ABC was the organization he was looking to join. The lack of a formal organization would offer him the opportunity to claim real power when the network matured. So, he signed on with Scherick as an assistant producer.

Several months before ABC began broadcasting NCAA college football games, Arledge sent Scherick a remarkable memo, filled with youthful exuberance, and television production concepts which sports broadcasts have adhered to since. Previously, network sporting broadcasts had consisted of simple set-ups and focused on the game itself. The genius of Arledge in this memo was not that he offered another way to broadcast the game to the sports fan. Arledge recognized television had to take the sports fan to the game. In addition, Arledge realized that the broadcasts needed to attract, and hold the attention of women viewers. At age 29 on September 17, 1960, he put his vision into reality with ABC's first NCAA college football broadcast from Birmingham, Alabama, between Alabama Crimson Tide and the Georgia Bulldogs won by Alabama, 21–6. That same year, ABC began broadcasting games in the fledgling American Football League and used the same innovative techniques in their broadcasts. Sports broadcasting has not been the same since.

=== ABC Sports ===
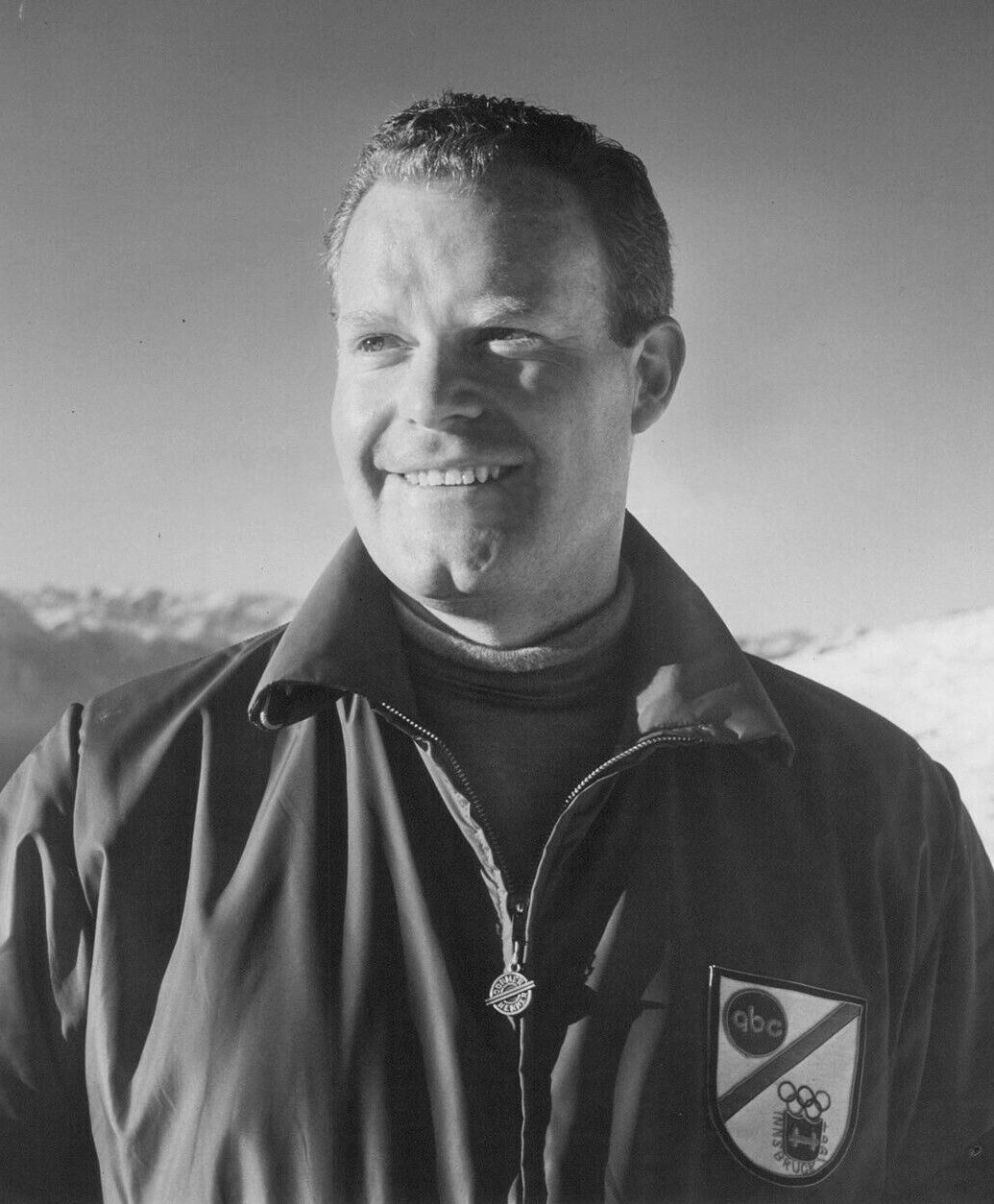
Arledge in 1968

Despite the production values he brought to NCAA college football, Scherick wanted low-budget (as in inexpensive broadcasting rights) sports programming that could attract and retain an audience. He hit upon the idea of broadcasting track and field events sponsored by the Amateur Athletic Union. While Americans were not exactly fans of track and field events, Scherick figured Americans understood games.

So in January 1961, Scherick called Arledge into his office and asked him to attend the annual AAU board of governors meeting. While he was shaking hands, Scherick said, if the mood seemed right, might he cut a deal to broadcast AAU events on ABC? It seemed a tall assignment, but as Scherick said years later, "Roone was a gentile and I was not." Arledge came back with a deal for ABC to broadcast all AAU events for $50,000 a year.

Next, Scherick and Arledge divided up their NCAA college football sponsor list. They then telephoned their sponsors and said in so many words, "Advertise on our new sports show coming up in April, or forget about buying commercials on NCAA college football this fall." The two persuaded enough sponsors to advertise, though it took them to the last day of a deadline imposed by ABC programming to do it.

Arledge was watching the television news coverage of President Kennedy’s assassination in late November 1963. While there was no film footage of Oswald shooting President Kennedy available to air, the shooting of Oswald by Jack Ruby was recorded on videotape. As a result, network television stations replayed the assassination several times after Oswald’s shooting. Arledge realized that videotape could be played, rewound, and replayed much easier than celluloid film. Therefore he suggested that ABC’s coverage of NCAA football include “instant replays” of important or impressive action on the playing field. Wide World of Sports suited Scherick's plans exactly. By exploiting the speed of jet transportation and flexibility of videotape, Scherick was able to undercut NBC and CBS's advantages in broadcasting live sporting events. In that era, with communications nowhere near as universal as they are today, ABC was able to safely record events on videotape for later broadcast without worrying about an audience finding out the results.

Arledge, his colleague Chuck Howard, and Jim McKay (who left CBS for this opportunity) made up the show on a week-by-week basis the first year it was broadcast. Arledge had a genius for the dramatic storyline that unfolded in the course of a game or event. McKay's honest curiosity and reporter's bluntness gave the show an emotional appeal that attracted viewers who might not otherwise watch a sporting event.

But more importantly from Arledge's perspective, Wide World of Sports allowed him to demonstrate his ability as an administrator as well as producer. Arledge did not gain a formal title as president of ABC Sports until 1968, even though Scherick left his position to assume a position of vice president for programming at ABC in 1964.

Arledge personally produced all ten ABC Olympic broadcasts, created the primetime Monday Night Football, and is said to have coined ABC's famous "The thrill of victory, and the agony of defeat" tagline — although the line was voiced by, and may have originated with, Arledge’s senior broadcaster Jim McKay. He also presided as producer over the 1975 flop, Saturday Night Live with Howard Cosell, which director Don Mischer blamed on Arledge's inexperience with the variety show genre and indifference to the work required.

=== ABC News ===
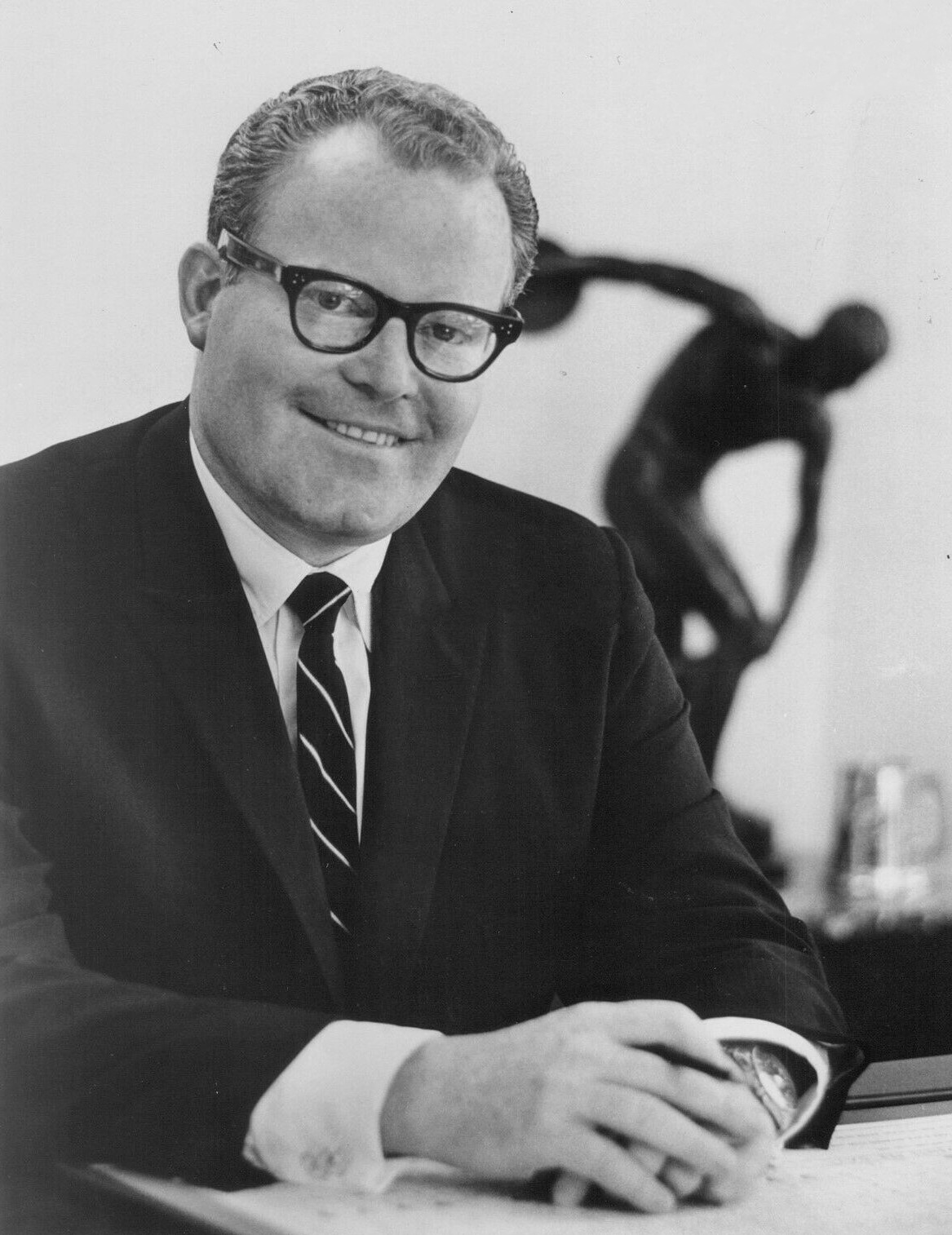
Arledge in the 1970s

Arledge took over as President of ABC News during a time that had been characterized by blunders such as the disastrous pairing of Barbara Walters with Harry Reasoner at the desk of the network's evening news. The previous year, ABC had lured Walters away from NBC's Today Show for $1,000,000. Previous to that time, the only news experience Arledge had was providing ABC's coverage of the tragedies during the '72 Olympics in Munich. Other than that, he had no other major experience in news. Arledge's first major creation for ABC was 20/20, which premiered in June 1978. The first iteration of this program fared badly, and resulted in the firing of the original hosts, with Hugh Downs chosen as the new anchor beginning the second week of the program, with the above-mentioned Barbara Walters joining Downs the following year, eventually becoming Downs' co-anchor by 1981.

Shortly thereafter, Arledge reformatted the network's evening newscast with many of the splashy graphics he had developed at Wide World of Sports, and created World News Tonight. The program was unique not only because it was anchored by three newsmen, but because each of them was located in separate cities. The lead anchor became Frank Reynolds, who was based in Washington, with Max Robinson based out of Chicago, and Peter Jennings reporting from London. The program expanded to Sundays in 1979 and Saturdays in 1985.

In 1983, Reynolds died of bone cancer, and Robinson departed the network, and ABC made Jennings the sole anchor of World News Tonight on September 5, 1983. Jennings anchored the broadcast until April 5, 2005, when he announced that he had been diagnosed with lung cancer, to which Jennings would succumb on August 7, 2005.

In 1979, the U.S. Embassy in Tehran, Iran was taken over by Iranian students, creating the Iranian Hostage Crisis. And on November 4, 1979, Frank Reynolds began anchoring a series of special reports entitled America Held Hostage. Several nights later, Ted Koppel, then the network's diplomatic correspondent to the U.S. State Department, took over as anchor. The special reports led to the creation of Nightline, which premiered on March 24, 1980. Koppel anchored the broadcast with Chris Bury, and served as its managing editor. Koppel retained the position until his retirement in November 2005.

In 1981, Arledge brought David Brinkley to ABC from NBC, and created the Sunday-morning affairs program This Week for Brinkley. Brinkley would retire from the program in 1996. The last major news program created during Arledge's reign at ABC News was Primetime Live, in 1989. The program was originally anchored by Sam Donaldson and Diane Sawyer.

During this period, he featured in What they don't teach you in Harvard Business School as an example of a senior executive who required long business lunches and "where it's best to go slow".

In 1986, Arledge stepped down as president of ABC Sports. That same year, ABC's World News Tonight began a ten-year domination of the network news ratings. In 1998, Arledge retired from ABC News. Arledge died on December 5, 2002, in New York City, New York, at the age of 71, following a battle with prostate cancer. He was buried in Southampton Cemetery. His autobiography, Roone: A Memoir, was published posthumously in 2003.

== United States Championship Tournament scandal ==
In 1976, managing editor of The Ring, Johnny Ort fabricated records of selected boxers, to elevate them, thereby securing them lucrative fights in the United States Championship Tournament, which was promoted by Don King and sponsored by ABC Sports. The scandal was uncovered by boxing writer Malcolm "Flash" Gordon and ABC staffer Alex Wallau. After Gordon and Wallau's evidence was presented to Arledge the United States Championship tournament was cancelled. The scandal would lead to the eventual resignation of New York State Boxing Commissioner James A. Farley Jr., who had lent his name to the Championship fights.

== 20/20 criticism ==
In October 1985, Arledge, then president of ABC News and Sports, made the decision to not air a 13-minute 20/20 report on the relationship between Marilyn Monroe and President John F. Kennedy and his brother Robert. The report was the result of a two month long investigation by journalist Sylvia Chase, and was also based on the then-recently released biography of Monroe Goddess, the Secret Lives of Marilyn Monroe by Anthony Summers.

Arledge's decision to kill the segment (which was possibly a result of his personal friendship with Robert's widow, Ethel Kennedy) drew criticism from the program's co-anchors, Hugh Downs and Barbara Walters, as well as from the executive producer, Av Westin.

Arledge said that he had killed the piece because it was "gossip-column stuff" and "[did] not live up to its billing." Downs, however, took issue with Arledge's judgment. "I am upset about the way it was handled," he said in an interview. "I honestly believe that this is more carefully documented than anything any network did during Watergate. I lament the fact that the decision reflects badly on people I respect and it reflects badly on me and the broadcast."

The week prior to the report's cancellation, and before Arledge had seen it, Westin said, "I don't anticipate not putting it on the air. The journalism is solid. Everything in there has two sources. We are documenting that there was a relationship between Bobby and Marilyn and Jack and Marilyn. A variety of eyewitnesses attest to that on camera."

According to an ABC staff member who had seen it, the unaired report included eyewitness accounts of wiretapping of Monroe's home by Teamsters leader Jimmy Hoffa that reveal meetings between her and the Kennedy brothers, and accounts of a visit to Monroe by Robert F. Kennedy on the day of her death. Private detective and former police officer Fred Otash is interviewed on camera and claims he was the chief wiretapper, and ABC staff members said his account was corroborated by three other alleged wiretappers. Additionally, they said that several people who do not appear in Summers' book appear on camera with claims that Monroe kept diaries with references to meetings with the Kennedy brothers.

Arledge claimed that much of the report was based on hearsay, saying, "It set out to be a piece which would demonstrate that because of alleged relations between Bobby Kennedy and John Kennedy and Marilyn Monroe the Presidency was compromised because organized crime was involved," but that "[based] on what has been uncovered so far, there was no evidence." He was further quoted as saying, "So far nobody has found the tapes. There were not enough credible witnesses. You could conclude from the piece that she had an affair or might have had an affair, but we didn't find evidence of a larger story."

Although David Burke, an ABC vice president, excused himself from involvement in the review of the report, due to his own relationship with the Kennedy family (having once worked for Senator Edward M. Kennedy), Arledge did not, saying of Ethel Kennedy, "[she] is a friend of mine like hundreds of people we do stories on. That has never affected our judgment."

Arledge's decision to kill the broadcast subsequently resulted in Geraldo Rivera's decision to leave ABC entirely. Rivera was a 20/20 correspondent who, although did not work on that story specifically, had been publicly critical of Arledge's decision. Chase also left the network shortly after Rivera did, moving from New York to San Francisco to take a job with KRON-TV. Although at the time she denied that her departure was related to the cancellation of her 20/20 piece, she later wrote that it had been a factor in her decision to leave.

== Honors ==
Arledge was selected by Life magazine as one of the "100 Most Important Americans of the 20th Century". Sports Illustrated ranked him number three in a list of "the 40 individuals who have most significantly altered or elevated the world of sports in the last four decades".

The NATPE "Man of the Year" Iris Award was presented to him in 1971. In 1981, he was a recipient of the Silver Olympic Order.

He was the winner of 37 Emmy Awards and in 1990 was inducted into the Television Academy Hall of Fame. In 2001, he was given the Pete Rozelle Radio-Television Award by the Pro Football Hall of Fame. In 2007, The Walt Disney Company posthumously named Arledge a Disney Legend for his contributions to ABC News and ABC Sports (now ESPN on ABC), both (along with the ABC Network) now owned by Disney.

The Roone Arledge auditorium located in student center Alfred Lerner Hall of Columbia University, Arledge's Alma Mater, is named in his honor.

In 1997, Arledge won the Walter Cronkite Award for Excellence in Journalism.

Arledge was portrayed by John Heard in the 2002 TNT movie Monday Night Mayhem. In the 2024 film September 5, about ABC's coverage of the 1972 Munich Olympics, Arledge was portrayed by Peter Sarsgaard.

== General sources ==
- Arledge, Roone (2003). Roone. New York: Harper-Collins Publishers. ISBN 9780060197339.
