= James A. Farley Jr. =

American sports commissioner (1928–1986)

James Aloysius Farley Jr. (May 26, 1928 – August 6, 1986) was an American sports commissioner who served as chairman of the New York State Athletic Commission from 1975 to 1977.

== Early life ==
Farley was born on May 26, 1928, at Good Samaritan Hospital in Suffern, New York to Elizabeth and James Farley. He attended Canterbury School and Georgetown Preparatory School. On March 11, 1950, he married Patricia Dillion in the Lady chapel of St. Patrick's Cathedral. The couple divorced on July 19, 1967 in Mexico. On August 15, 1967, Farley married Jean Loew at the Sands Hotel and Casino.

== Professional career ==
Farley began his professional career as the vice president of his father's building material business - the General Builders Supply Corporation. He later served as president of Brooklyn's Central State Bank. Farley was also part of a group that owned New York's roller derby franchise and was one of the sports chief promoters.

== New York State Athletic Commission ==
In 1956, Governor W. Averell Harriman appointed Farley to fill the seat on the New York State Athletic Commission vacated by Robert K. Christenberry. In 1960, Farley was reappointed by Harriman's successor Nelson Rockefeller. He was not reappointed when his term ended in 1965 and was succeeded by Albert Berkowitz.

In 1975, Farley was appointed chairman of the athletic commission by Governor Hugh Carey. Prior to taking office, the commission had been inactive and had its budget eliminated for financial reasons. As chairman, Farley pushed for legislation to legalize boxing and wrestling on Sundays and to eliminate the minimum age requirement to attend these events. In 1977, Farley served as supervisor of the United States Boxing Championship, a Don King promoted boxing tournament sponsored by ABC Sports. As supervisor, he received free travel and living expenses. Due to alleged kickbacks and fixes in the tournament, Governor Carey ordered an investigation. On April 24, 1977, Farley suspended himself from the commission until the investigation was complete. He resigned from the commission on June 3, 1977.

== Death ==
Farley died on August 6, 1986, at the Seton Medical Center in Daly City, California from complications following heart bypass surgery. He was survived by his three children.
