= Jermall Charlo =

American boxer (born 1990)

Personal information
- Nicknames: Hitman; The Future of Boxing
- Born: May 19, 1990 (age 36) Lafayette, Louisiana, U.S.
- Height: 6 ft 0 in (183 cm)
- Weight: Light middleweight; Middleweight; Super Middleweight

Boxing career
- Reach: 74 in (188 cm)
- Stance: Orthodox

Boxing record
- Total fights: 34
- Wins: 34
- Win by KO: 23

Jermall Charlo (/dʒɜːrˈmɑːl/; born May 19, 1990) is an American professional boxer. He has held world championships in two weight classes, including the International Boxing Federation (IBF) light middleweight title from 2015 to 2017 and the World Boxing Council (WBC) middleweight title from 2019 to 2024. His identical twin brother, Jermell Charlo, is also a professional boxer who was the undisputed light middleweight world champion.

== Early life ==
Jermall is older than his identical twin Jermell by one minute. Both brothers are graduates of Alief Hastings High School in Houston, Texas.

== Amateur career ==
They began boxing when they started following their father, himself a former boxer, into the gym. As an amateur, Jermall was hopeful for a spot on the 2008 U.S. Olympic team but was forced to back out due to a toe injury. He competed in the amateur ranks for one more year and finished with a record of 65 wins and 6 losses.

== Professional career ==
=== Light middleweight ===
==== Early career ====
On August 12, 2008, Charlo made his professional debut against Cimmaron Davis and won the fight via 2nd-round technical knockout. On July 11, 2009, Charlo faced Deon Nash, the opponent his brother Jermell went up against and beat in 2008. Jermall won a comfortable unanimous decision victory and later fought Nash to a rematch on August 28, 2010, and Charlo would end up winning again by a corner retirement. On October 24, 2010, Charlo went up against Puerto Rican Carlos Garcia, whom his brother Jermell had fought a year prior. Both brothers beat Garcia by unanimous decision. Over the next five years, Charlo remained undefeated picking up wins over Orlando Lora, Antwone Smith and Norberto Gonzalez. By the close of 2014, Charlo had a record of 20 wins with 16 coming inside the distance and no losses.

On March 28, 2015, Charlo went up against a highly talented prospect, Michael Kenneth Finney (12–2–1, 10 KOs) at The Pearl, Palms Casino, in Las Vegas. Charlo won all of the rounds on all 3 judges scorecards and won a unanimous decision victory. The fight nearly came to an end a few times during the fight; however, Finney managed to take Charlo the distance for the fifth time in his career.

==== Charlo vs. Bundrage ====
In May 2015, 42-year-old Cornelius Bundrage (34–5, 19 KOs) was ordered by the IBF to make a mandatory title defense against Charlo. July 25 was a potential date discussed initially. On June 8, a few weeks prior to the fight taking place, Bundrage was forced to pull out of the fight citing an injury above his left eye. The card, which was scheduled to July 18 was postponed. The deep cut happened during a sparring session. On August 17, it was confirmed the fight would take place at the Foxwoods Resort Casino in Ledyard, Connecticut, on September 12. After an 18-month wait, Charlo dismantled Bundrage and captured the IBF light middleweight title with a dominating third-round knockout win. Bundrage was knocked down once in rounds 1 and 2 and twice in round 3. An overhand right put Bundrage down in round 1. Charlo never allowed Bundrage to get into the fight, constantly applying pressure. The second knockdown, which occurred in round 2 was from a left jab. Fast combinations to the head dropped Bundrage early in round 3 and a couple of minutes later, a final blow to the head. The referee did attempt to make a count and stopped the fight at 2 minutes and 33 seconds. After the fight, Bundrage said, "I hadn't fought in (11 months), you can't be inactive fighting these young guys."

==== Charlo vs. Campfort ====
A few weeks after winning the title, Charlo's trainer Ronnie Shields confirmed that Charlo would make his first defence against veteran Wilky Campfort (21–1, 12 KOs) on November 28, 2015, at The Bomb Factory in Dallas, Texas. Campfort's sole loss on his record came in his second professional fight via majority decision after 4 rounds. Shield's, who had been training both the twins, recently confirmed he would no longer be working with Jermell. He stated it was on good terms and it would not affect how Jermall would perform. Charlo floored Campfort in round 2 with a counter right hand. He recorded a second knockdown the following round after a flurry in the corner forced Campfort to take a voluntary knee. Towards the end of round 3 Charlo hit a perfect left uppercut clean to his left eye of Campfort's, compromising his vision was instantly to take a knee again. Despite beating the count, Campfort complained that he was unable to see, causing referee Mark Calo-Oy to wave off the fight. Over the 4 rounds, Charlo out landed Campfort 62–11, connecting on 30% of his power shots. After the bout, Charlo confirmed he would stay at light middleweight and continue to defend his title; however, he wanted big fights. He also praised his jab, calling it the best in the business.

==== Charlo vs. Trout ====
On March 29, 2016, it was announced that Charlo would make a defence against former world champion Austin Trout (30–2, 17 KOs) at The Cosmopolitan of Las Vegas in Las Vegas, Nevada on May 21. The card also included top light middleweights Erislandy Lara, Vanes Martirosyan and his brother Jermell. In a close contested bout, Charlo defeated Trout by a 12-round unanimous decision. The judges' scored the fight 115–113, 116–112, 116–112. Charlo landed the harder shots to dominate the action in the first six rounds. However, Charlo seemed to gas out a little in the second half of the fight, and was outworked by Trout. Trout suffered a cut over his right eye in the 10th round from a clash of heads but fought well despite suffering the cut. The crowd booed loudly when the scores were read out to let the judges know that they felt Trout should have won. Charlo landed 130 of 474 punches thrown (27%) and Trout landed 117 of his 490 thrown (24%). Trout received a purse of $300,000 and Charlo earned a purse of $500,000.

==== Charlo vs. Williams ====
Charlo's next title defense was set to be against the No. 1 contender Julian Williams (22–0–1, 14 KOs) on December 10, 2016, at the USC Galen Center in Los Angeles, California. The fight was pushed back as Charlo was nursing an eye injury and was given a 60-day medical extension by IBF. There were also rumours that Charlo would vacate the title to move up to middleweight. Charlo retained his IBF light middleweight title with a fifth round stoppage of Williams. Charlo dropped Williams in the second round with a powerful jab. Williams came back and fought a clever fight, making Charlo miss, slipping punches, landing some good counters. In round 5, Charlo landed a right uppercut, dropping Williams hard. Williams got up; however, Charlo went for the finish, and got it with a third knockdown after a barrage of punches ending with a left hook. After the referee stopped the fight, Williams went over to congratulate Charlo. Charlo didn't want to embrace and told Williams,"I don't want your congratulations, I want your apology." The crowd noticing the heat between the two corners started to boo Charlo. In the post fight interview, Charlo stated Williams had disrespected him leading up to the fight, he also called out Canelo and Golovkin, stating he would move up to middleweight. The fight aired on Showtime and averaged 321,000 viewers, peaking at 370,000 viewers.

=== Middleweight ===
Charlo officially vacated his IBF light middleweight title on February 16, 2017, in order to move up to middleweight. Charlo had wanted to unify the light middleweight division, but there were no titlists available. At the time, twin Jermell, who Jermall had vowed not to fight, held the WBC title. He also stated after the Williams fight that he had been struggling to make weight. Charlo told ESPN, "It was either going to be a big fight for me at 154 pounds, like against Miguel Cotto or Canelo Álvarez, something big like that, or move up," On March 11, WBC ranked Charlo number 2 ahead of David Lemieux and Curtis Stevens, who were ranked number 3 and 4 respectively. The IBF gave Charlo a number 3 ranking. In March 2017, it was reported by ESPN Deportes that an announcement would be made for Charlo to fight WBC number 1 ranked, Argentinian boxer Jorge Sebastian Heiland in a final eliminator.

==== Charlo vs. Heiland ====
On June 5, 2017, reports circulated around Argentina that WBC mandatory challenger Jorge Sebastian Heiland (28–4–2, 15 KOs) would be ordered to fight Charlo in a final eliminator. Heiland had been the mandatory since 2015. Early talks indicated the fight could take place on the undercard of the Mikey Garcia vs. Adrien Broner undercard. On June 9, the WBC officially ordered the fight between the two, with the winner becoming the mandatory challenger for the winner of Canelo Álvarez vs. Gennady Golovkin, which would take place in September 2017. The fight was officially announced on June 27. Charlo weighed in a career high 159.2 pounds while Heiland came in slightly lighter at 158.2 pounds.

Charlo became the mandatory challenger for the WBC middleweight title, with a stoppage win over an injured Heiland in round 4. At the start of the fight, it was clear that Heiland's left leg was injured. Charlo first dropped Heiland in round 2 with a left to the head. In round 4, Charlo landed another left hook to the head which dropped Heiland again. Heiland beat the count, but as he was getting up, he stumbled around due to the injury. Referee Benji Esteves stopped the fight immediately at 2:13 of the fourth round to ensure Heiland took no more punishment. Charlo spoke to Showtime's Jim Gray in the post fight interview, "Sometimes the injury can be a decoy. You never want to just jump in and think it's part of his game plan. My coach [Ronnie Shields] told me to stay behind my job like I did, continue to work and it's gonna come." The ringside doctor checked Heiland's leg before the fourth round but let the action continue. Heiland stated that his leg was okay before the fight and the injury occurred in the opening round. Charlo earned $350,000 compared to Heiland who had $200,000 purse. The fight drew an average 500,000 viewers and peaked at 542,000 viewers on Showtime.

==== Charlo vs. Centeno ====
On November 21, 2017, the WBC announced that Charlo would have the opportunity to claim the Interim WBC middleweight title against Hugo Centeno (26–1, 14 KOs). WBC President Maurcio Sulaiman explained the reason for this being due to the full WBC title being tied up in a potential rematch between Golovkin and Álvarez. A possible date in January 2018 was being discussed at the time. Due to negotiations not being made, on January 2, 2018, Sulaiman ordered the fight and confirmed it would be sanctioned by the WBC for the interim championship. On January 23, the fight was made official to take place on the undercard of Deontay Wilder's WBC heavyweight title defence against Luis Ortiz on March 3 at the Barclays Center. On February 23, the fight was postponed after Centeno injured his ribs in training. The fight was quickly rescheduled to take place on April 21 on the Adrien Broner vs. Jessie Vargas undercard. On fight night, in front of 13,964 in attendance, Charlo won the vacant WBC interim middleweight title after knocking out Centeno in round 2. The knockdown came when Charlo landed a left hook to the head followed by a right hand to Centeno. The fight was promptly halted by referee Steve Willis. The official time was at 0:55 of round 2. Charlo spend the first round stalking Centeno, who was reluctant to exchange. After the fight, Charlo said, "I'm a two-time world champion. Bring on Triple G! I want that fight! The networks [HBO and Showtime] and the teams can figure out how to get the Triple G fight done. I have the best manager [Al Haymon] in the world. I'm 27–0 with 21 knockouts. Everybody sees it. What more can I say?" CompuBox Stats showed that Charlo landed 12 of 35 punches thrown (34%) and Centeno landed 10 of his 31 thrown (32%). Charlo earned $500,000 to Centeno's $235,000 purse.

==== Charlo vs. Korobov ====
In October 2018, Premier Boxing Champions announced a doubleheader for December 22, 2018, at the Barclays Center in Brooklyn, New York. The card, which would be televised by FOX, would feature Jermell Charlo defending his WBC light middleweight title against Tony Harrison and Jermall Charlo defending his WBC interim middleweight title against former world title challenger Willie Monroe Jr. (23–3, 6 KOs). The twins flipped a coin to see who would close the show. The official press conference took place on October 25. On December 15, a week before the fight, it was reported that the WBC had been alerted of an adverse finding in Monroe's pre-fight drug test. It was reported that Russian boxer Matt Korobov (28–1, 14 KOs), who was scheduled to fight on the untelevised undercard against Juan DeAngel, stepped up to the challenge. Koborov, usually fighting at the light heavyweight limit, was dropping down to super middleweight to fight DeAngel, and now had six days to come down to 160 pounds from super middleweight. The WBC issued a statement confirmed Monroe would not be able to challenge Charlo for the title. They also confirmed the adverse finding was a banned steroidal substance. According to the sample collector, Monroe disclosed that he had used a non-specific "testosterone booster", as written in the doping control form; however, he did not request a 'therapeutic use exception' for the substance. Charlo vs. Korobov was confirmed on December 17. Korobov had only two pounds to lose as it was revealed the contracted weight limit for his fight against DeAngel was 162 pounds.

There was an announced crowd of 9,177 fans in attendance. Charlo put in an unimpressive performance but retained his title via a controversial unanimous decision. Korobov's best punch was his left hand, which kept landing on Charlo, who seemed to have no answer for it throughout the fight. This could well have been down to not having enough chance to adjust his training after Korobov was drafted in as a late replacement. The first six rounds saw Korobov repeatedly landing the straight left which on many occasions, snapped Charlo's head back. Korobov slowed down during the championship rounds which allowed Charlo to come on strong and win the remaining rounds, nearly stopping Korobov in the twelfth round, but Korobov used his experience to hold on. The scorecards read 119–108, 116–112, and 116–112 in Charlo's favor. Charlo was the busier of the two, throwing nearly 200 more punches than Korobov. Compubox showed that he landed a total of 170 of 654 punches thrown (26%), while Korobov landed 128 of his 457 thrown (28%). After the fight, Charlo said, "I used everything that happened tonight as motivation in the 12th round. I haven't been that far in a fight in a couple of years. It felt good to be in there, get hit and bang with someone. He was an experienced guy who will make me better." He referred to his twin Jermell, who had lost his world titles prior to his fight. His trainer Ronnie Shields also stated he had to make sure Charlo was still focussed on the task ahead after seeing his brother lose. Korobov felt he won the fight and believed many fans would also think the same. The average viewership for the card, which was PBC's return to FOX, was 2,114,184. The card peaked 2,421,000 viewers, which was during the main event.

Mike Borao, Korobov's manager was disgusted with the 119–108 scorecard. When the scorecard was first read out, he assumed Korobov had won the fight. He said, "Boxing scoring is subjective, but 119–108 is outrageous. When a judge submits a scorecard like that, he should never judge another meaningful fight again." The judge in question Larry Hazzard Jr., only scored round 5 for Korobov and scored the last round 10–8 for Charlo.

==== Charlo vs. Adams ====
It was confirmed on April 3, 2019, that #12 ranked Brandon Adams (21–2, 13 KOs) had agreed terms to challenge Charlo for his interim WBC title. Adams was fresh off winning the fifth season of The Contender. He was also given the opportunity to fight Gennady Golovkin in a non-title bout, which Adams ultimately declined, in order to fight for a world title. The two dates being pushed were June 8 and June 15; however, there was boxing cards headlined by Golovkin and Tyson Fury on those dates, respectively. PBC decided to go with June 29 in Houston. On May 10, the tripleheader was formally announced which would see Charlo fight in his hometown of Houston for only the third time in his professional career, at the NRG Arena. He last fought in Houston in 2012. During fight week, Charlo was elevated to full WBC championship status. Charlo weighed 159½ pounds and Adams weighed in at the 160 pound limit.

In front of a sold-out crowd of 6,408 fans, Charlo won a near-shutout decision. Adams came out to box, and was tricky at times for Charlo. However, Charlo still managed to dominate throughout most of the fight. Adams was better than many thought he'd be. He displayed good defensive skill, making Charlo miss on many occasions. Two of the judges had Charlo winning 120–108 and one had it 119–109 for the champion. Charlo was not able to get the desired knockout win; however, it was revealed post-fight that he injured his left hand, which Charlo used as an excuse for not getting the stoppage. Charlo landed 151 of 634 punches thrown (24%) and Adams landed 73 of 334 his punches (22%). The fight averaged 379,000 viewers on Showtime and peaked at 434,000 viewers.

==== Charlo vs. Hogan ====
In October 2019, it was announced that Charlo would make his second defence, headlining a Showtime card on December 7, against Irish Boxer Dennis Hogan (28–2–1, 7 KOs) at the Barclays Center in New York. A press conference was due to make it official. Hogan was ranked #5 at middleweight by the WBC, but was coming up in weight after failing to dethrone WBO light middleweight champion Jaime Munguia in April 2019, which ended in a controversial majority decision. Charlo was not happy to be taken the full 12-round distance in both his last two fights and aimed for a knockout against Hogan. At the press conference, he said, "I'm ready to get back to my thing, which is knocking them out and getting them out of there. This is a big fight for me because it's my 30th fight and I'm about to turn 30." Charlo's trainer Ronnie Shields acknowledged Hogan's previous performance and felt he won. According to Paul Keegan, CEO of DDP Sports, who promoted Hogan, the reason for the move up in weight class was due to no one willing to fight him. Hogan was confident he would be stronger with the extra weight. Hogan stepped on the scale at 158¼ pounds and Charlo weighed 159½ pounds.

Charlo dropped Hogan twice, en route to a seventh-round TKO victory. Charlo delivered on his promise, producing a spectacular one-punch knockout. Prior to the fight, Hogan had only been dropped once in his career. Only 12 seconds into round 4, Hogan was dropped by a left uppercut. He made it back to his feet quickly. The end came in the seventh, in the opening minute. Charlo feinted a jab, setting up a left hook, which landed, pushing Hogan back towards the ropes. Hogan bravely got to his feet again, but referee Charlie Fitch waived off the bout. Charlo revealed he had been working on perfecting the uppercut for the fight. Hogan stated he wanted to continue after the second knockdown. His nose was busted and he looked dazed as he rose to his feet. According to Compubox, Charlo landed 86 of 266 punches thrown (32%), and Hogan landed 71 of his 418 thrown (17%). The fight averaged 249,000 viewers, only peaking 275,000 viewers.

==== Charlo vs. Derevyanchenko ====
On July 22, 2020, it was announced that the Charlo twins would co-headline a Showtime PPV. The card was scheduled to take place on September 26 at the Mohegan Sun Arena in Uncasville, Connecticut. Charlo would defend his WBC title against his toughest opponent to date, WBC #1 and The Ring #4 ranked Sergiy Derevyanchenko (13–2, 10 KOs). Derevyanchenko declined a lucrative offer to fight Saul Álvarez on September 12 at super middleweight, in order to challenge Charlo. Charlo wanted to cement his status as a top middleweight. The way he wanted to do this was by getting a stoppage win over Derevyanchenko. He had previously been dropped by Golovkin and Daniel Jacobs but took them both the distance, losing close decisions. At the press conference, Charlo said, "It would definitely deliver a statement to the world of boxing, to let them know that, yeah, the power's for real and I can get in there with just about anybody." Both made weight with Charlo coming in at 159¾ pounds and Derevyanchenko weighing 159½ pounds.

In what was probably his toughest opponent up to date, Charlo used a powerful jab, showed a good chin and a variety of shots to outpoint Derevyanchenko to a unanimous decision win after 12 rounds. Charlo would utilize his superior height and reach, and powerful jab to box effectively at the start of the bout, shaking the challenger late in the third with an overhand right. Derevyanchenko would grow into the bout in the middle rounds, being to close the distance and steadily land punches with both hands. Going to the body with left and landing right hands over the top. Although both boxers would land many hard punches, it was Charlo's punches that were more accurate, bruising Derevyanchenko face and causing blood to flow from his left eye. Derevyanchenko would nevertheless keep coming forward and backing the champion along the ropes. The judges scorecards read 116–112, 117–111, 118–110 all in Charlo's favour. The wide scorecards did not clearly reflect how tough Derevyanchenko made the fight for Charlo.

Compubox showed that Charlo landed 219 of 627 punches thrown (34.9%) and Derevyanchenko landed 180 punches of 681 thrown (26.4%). This was the most that any opponent had landed on Charlo in his career. During the post-fight, Charlo said, "I made my team proud and I did what I was supposed to do. I executed the game plan. [Trainer] Ronnie Shields told me that I passed the test tonight." He was happy with his overall performance. Charlo was guaranteed $1.5 million plus PPV split. Derevyanchenko reportedly earned $500,000 for his efforts. The PPV generated between 100,000 and 120,000 buys.

==== Charlo vs. Montiel ====
In April 2021, Charlo's next fight was announced, an optional defence, against unheralded challenger Juan Macias Montiel (22–4–2, 22 KOs) on Showtime. Montiel was coming off a first-round knockout win over former contender James Kirkland in December 2020. He was considered a dangerous opponent despite his losses as all his wins were via stoppage. June 19 was the date, with the card to be held in Houston, later confirmed to be Toyota Center. Due to the event taking place on Juneteenth Day and in Texas, the WBC created a commemorate title called "Freedom Belt", which would be contested for in the fight. Many predicted the fight to finish inside the distance, due to Charlo's punching power and all of Montiel's wins coming via stoppage. During fight week, mayor Sylvester Turner was present to officially declare June 19 as "Jermell and Jermall Charlo Day" in Houston. Charlo weighed in at 160 pounds on his second attempt after first weighing in 0.4 pounds over the limit to ensure he did not lose his title on the scales. Montiel weighed in 159.5 pounds. Charlo was a huge 33–1 favorite for the fight.

Charlo was in control throughout the fight, winning a unanimous decision, retaining his title. Charlo was hurt multiple times in the fight more towards the closing rounds, after breezing through the opening 6 rounds. Most of the damaging shots that Montiel threw were aimed at the body, which slowed down Charlo momentum. Montiel was tired during the championship rounds; however, his power still came through in his punches. The scorecards were slightly wide at 118–109, 119–109, 120–108. Charlo ended the fight with a cut over his right eye, which was caused in round 8. He stated after that fight that he had never been cut before. He added, "I never looked like this. And I knew he was putting in that work. He put in that work to fight me." He also praised Montiel for bringing the fight to him and his determination. Charlo landed more than double the amount of punches as Montiel (258–127), including a career-high 201 power punches. He landed 36 punches in the sixth round. The fight averaged 333,000 viewers and peaked at 379,000 viewers.

==== Cancelled fights and inactivity ====
In March 2022, it was reported that a fight between Charlo and former light middleweight world champion Jaime Munguía (39–0, 31 KOs) was being explored to take place in June 2022 in Houston. Munguía had previously moved on from talks involving Janibek Alimkhanuly (11–0, 7 KOs), which the WBO ordered for their interim title. Whilst negotiations continued, ESPN reported the fight would not come off. The main point was due to the two sides not agreeing which platform the fight would air. TGB Promotions, who work on behalf of PBC, made the offer for the fight to air on Showtime; however, Golden Boy Promotions, who promote Munguia along with Zanfer Promotions, work with DAZN, were hoping the fight could air on both platforms via pay-per-view. One solution, which came from Stephen Espinoza, was the fight to take place on Showtime PPV, as PBC was the lead promotion and in the event that Munguia won, Charlo would be able to trigger a rematch clause, which would then take place on DAZN PPV as Golden Boy would be the lead promotion. According to De La Hoya, unless DAZN were involved in the event, the fight would not happen.

After a deal was not made, PBC turned to plan C and on March 15, announced that Charlo would make a defence against Polish boxer Maciej Sulęcki (30–2, 11 KOs), to headline a Showtime card on June 18. Sulęcki's two losses came in failed world title challengers at against Demetrius Andrade and Daniel Jacobs, respectively. Plan B was a fight against Canelo Álvarez, which also never materialised. According to Tom Brown of TGB Promotions, Álvarez was offered a guaranteed $45 million to fight Charlo. Showtime and PBC later announced the fight along with 8 other cards, as part of their Spring-Summer schedule. A fight between Charlo and Sulęcki was first discussed briefly in 2018; however, Charlo fought Korobov instead. On May 4, the fight was officially announced to take place at Toyota Center in Houston and would mark the second consecutive year, in which Charlo was headlining a card to mark Juneteenth. With less than two weeks to go, the fight was postponed after Charlo suffered a back injury during training. According to Showtime, the fight would be rescheduled once Charlo was able to resume training.

In November, during their annual convention, WBC named all the mandatory challengers for their world champions. It was assumed that interim WBC champion Carlos Adames (22–1, 17 KOs) would be called upon. Mauricio Sulaimán advised he was being patient with Charlo as he was still recovering from an injury. BoxingScene.com reported Charlo had recovered from his back injury and was dealing with personal issues. Charlo broke his silence in February 2023. He wrote, via social media, "Practice makes perfection. I needed some time away from the sport. Back in my bag. I'll be defending my WBC title in June. Sorry for the wait." By June 2023, it meant Charlo would have been inactive for 24 months. Some raised concern over Charlo's recent inactivity, one of them being Adames, who insisted he be upgraded to full championship status. Fans also took to social media to voice their concerns over his two-year hiatus. Espinoza was open to the idea of staging Charlo vs. Adames in the fall of 2023, after Charlo's comeback fight. Sulaimán explained how the WBC would continue to support Charlo and revealed Charlo's inactivity stemmed from mental health problems. He also stated there would be no limit in terms of when Charlo had to fight. The WBC would not strip him of the title.

No fight was made for Charlo and in June, after a Dmitry Bivol rematch and a catchweight bout against Badou Jack began to fall through, Eddie Hearn listed Charlo as a potential frontrunner to challenge Canelo in September 2023. The fight seemed more likely after Canelo posted a video announcing he had partnered with PBC for his next fight to take place on PPV. The deal was believed to be a multi-fight agreement.

In August 2023, Charlo spoke to a group of reporters to talk about his current circumstances. He said, "I'll be back before the end of the year though. I promise you that. I'm getting back. I'm better now. Know what I'm sayin'? Everybody goes through things, you know. I faced my little adversity and the best thing about it is that I get to beat that adversity and y'all get to see the adversity. At a point in my life I didn't know what mental health even was. And a lot of people kind of shy away from showing that sensitive side of themselves. Yeah, because I'm the champ, they all look at me like, they're expecting greatness. And sometimes I don't have that greatness to provide and then I'm not mentally focused. So now that I'm mentally focused I feel like I'm a better person. I've evolved into something y'all probably would've never known. Sometimes it took me to get away from boxing at the time. I've been doing it for 20, 30 years. I had to get away from it a little bit. It is what it is. You can fault me for not fighting, but I'd rather be safe than sorry." On September 12, Sulaimán sad he spoke in depth with Charlo at the NABF's annual convention. He stated Charlo was ready, physically and mentally, to make a ring return.

==== Charlo vs. Benavidez Jr ====
In October 2023, Charlo's next fight was formally announced against José Benavidez Jr. (28–2–1, 19 KOs) on November 25 on Showtime Pay-Per-View. The card was to be headlined by José's brother David Benavidez, who was scheduled to fight Demetrius Andrade. It was not known whether Charlo's WBC title would be defended as Benavidez was not ranked. It was later announced the fight would take place at a 163-pound catchweight, 10-round non-title bout. Benavidez accused Charlo for not being a professional and using an excuse of not being able to make 160 pounds, but at the same time, acknowledged what Charlo had been through. Charlo hit back, stating it had nothing to do with weight issues. He considered the bout as a stepping stone and wanted to focus on defending his title against top contenders. After the fight, the WBC were ready to order Charlo vs. Adames. The official weigh in took place behind closed doors, hours before the ceremonial weigh ins. Despite the fight being 3 pounds above the middleweight limit, Charlo weighed in 166.4 pounds, 3.4 pounds above the limit set. Benavidez weighed 161.2 pounds. Charlo was given time to shed more weight off and when he stepped back on the scales, he came in heavier at 166.6 pounds. Charlo was docked $75,000 per pound over 163 weight limit. Benavidez and his team were not pleased that he came over and accused him of not being dedicated.

Charlo won the bout by unanimous decision. Benavidez came into the bout motivated; however, Charlo looked sharp throughout the fight, connecting with a lot of hard power shots, dominating the contest. The difference in talent showed in the fight. Benavidez tried to impose his aggression earlier on and had his best round in the fifth, but after the halfway mark, Charlo took over. The scorecards read 100–90, 99–91 and 98–92 in Charlo's favour, in what was his first fight in 29 months. Both boxers respectfully embraced following the fight. According to CompuBox, Charlo landed 243 of 613 punches (40%) and Benavidez landed 86 of 446 thrown (19%). Benavidez was out-landed in every round by a minimum 8 punches. Speaking after the fight, Charlo hinted he may stay in the super middleweight division.

==== Stripped of WBC title ====
On February 12, 2024, after weeks of rumours, it was reported that Charlo would challenge undisputed super middleweight champion Canelo Álvarez on May 4 in Las Vegas, Nevada. Two days later, whilst on vacation in Turks and Caicos, Charlo refuted these rumours, stating he had not spoken to Al Haymon since he last fought and no fight was confirmed for him. On February 26, despite being contracted to fight under the PBC banner in May, it was reported that Álvarez and PBC mutually agreed to part ways.

On May 6, Charlo was arrested and charged with three misdemeanours, one being a DWI. Court records showed his blood alcohol content was over 0.15, above the legal limit of .08. The next day, the WBC, after being continuously criticized for over a year, finally stripped Charlo of the WBC title, elevating Carlos Adames to full championship status. Despite this, Sulaiman stated they would continue to work closely with the PBC, to help support Charlo through difficult times. Sulaiman explained the WBC's decision, saying, "So the WBC has made the decision, but at the same time we have compassion and still care for [Charlo's] well-being. When he returns to boxing, we will walk with him, as well. "As I've always said, we are always going to give time for our champions – mental health is such a powerful issue in the world, now more than ever. We are talking to [Charlo's] promoter [TGB Promotions/Premier Boxing Champions] to help find the people who can help him with the specific actions he needs to take him to his recovery." Adames had also remained patient with the WBC during this time, having won the interim belt in October 2022.

=== Super middleweight ===
==== Charlo vs. LaManna ====
In January 2025, there were rumors that Charlo would make his ring return against Thomas LaManna on the Gervonta Davis-Lamont Roach Jr. PPV undercard on March 1. LaManna, who had been in training camp, announced the fight would no longer take place in March after he was told Charlo would not be ready for that date.

On March 26, 2025, Boxing Scene reported Charlo would make his long-awaited ring return against LaManna on May 31, at Michelob Ultra Arena in Las Vegas. The bout would be on the undercard of Caleb Plant vs. Armando Resendiz, which would headline PBC Prime Video, with the idea that should Charlo and Plant both be victorious in their respected bouts, would eventually face off against each other. LaManna was unhappy at being potentially overlooked. He also did not know what to expect come fight night, as many questioned the mental state of Charlo, mostly due to his inactivity. Charlo was not pleased with LaManna, who was on a 9-fight win streak, due to his trash talk after the fight was announced. Speaking at a Zoom presser, he said, "When I knock you out, I'm a stomp on yo ass."

Charlo returned to training with Hylon Williams Sr. for the fight. In the scheduled 10-round bout, Charlo scored three knockdowns, en route to stopping LaManna in the fifth round. In the opening round Charlo bloodied LaManna's nose. The first knockdown came in round 3 when Charlo landed an overhand right. LaManna made the 8-count. In round 4, LaManna was knocked down again. The end came in round 5 after Charlo scored another knockdown. LaManna managed to make it to the end of the round, but was badly bloodied from the nose. After the ringside doctor inspected LaManna before the sixth round, the fight was stopped. After the fight, Charlo told reporters, "It feels good to be back. I'm thankful to everyone who stood by me ... It goes on, man.You know you gotta go through things to get better. I got to work and I knew my timing was there. Shout out to my trainer Hylon Williams Snr." Charlo out-landed LaManna 67–19 in shots landed. In the main event Caleb Plant, the 25–1 betting favorite, lost a split decision against Armando Resendiz, throwing a spanner in the works for a future Plant vs. Charlo fight. Plant had a rematch clause which he could activate against Resendiz. Some within the boxing media hinted Charlo should next fight Resendiz next instead. Responding to Plant's loss, Charlo said, "We've got to go back to the drawing board on this one. Caleb Plant dropped the ball." Plant stated he could go straight into a grudge fight against Charlo, rather than rematch Resendiz.

==== Cancelled Ken Mazoudie bout ====
In November 2025, it was reported that talks had begun for a grudge match between Charlo and former world champion Caleb Plant (23-3, 14 KOs) to take place in 2026. This was despite the fact that Plant lost his last fight. In December, Charlo confirmed via Brian Custer’s YouTube channel, that the fight would take place January 31, 2026. Originally, he was aiming for the fight to take place before the year end, however, this was not possible. O January 5, 2026, Ronnie Shields confirmed that he is resuming his professional relationship with Charlo. On the reunion, he said, “We started from the very beginning and won championships together.” Shields wanted to reignite the winning formula. He continued, “You never lose what you had. You just got to get it back,” referring to consistent training to restore former capabilities.

On May 30, 2026, it was reported that Charlo would be added to the Errol Spence Jr. vs. Tim Tszyu card, which was scheduled for July 26 in Australia. On June 18, Australian boxer Koen Mazoudie was announced as his opponent. Despite attempting to secure entry approval throughout the week, Charlo was ultimately refused a visa into Australia. Charlo stated that he would not be able to compete despite having spent three months preparing for the fight and describing himself as "in shape, on weight, and ready". The fight was later rescheduled to take place on October 17, 2026, at The Cosmopolitan of Las Vegas, on the Sebastian Fundora vs Ermal Hadribeaj undercard. The bout was scheduled for 10-rounds. With just over a week before the event, Charlo was forced to withdraw after suffering an injury in training camp. Former WBA super middleweight champion Jose Armando Resendiz was selected as his replacement. The withdrawal represented another setback in a period of limited activity for Charlo, who had fought only four times since 2020.

== Legal troubles ==
According to TMZ Sports, Charlo was arrested following an incident which took place at the Privat Martini Bar & Social Club in San Antonio, Texas on July 16, 2021. Police documents claim that Charlo attended a bar with a large group. When the bill came, Charlo gave his credit card, but the waitress returned after the card declined. This is when a verbal altercation began between Charlo and the waitress, along with two managers. As Charlo and his party left the bar, they barged into the waitress, who alleged she injured her leg. Charlo turned himself in after arrest warrants were issued. There was also video evidence of the incident. He was formally charge with three counts of second-degree felony robbery, after footage showed him taking the check portfolio. Charlo's attorney, Kent A. Schaffer, stated: "I want to make clear that Jermall stole no money from anyone at the club and made no threats toward anyone. When (the club) ran his card, it was declined and he then received a fraud alert from Chase Bank asking if he had made the charge. He responded yes and they told him to have the charge submitted again. The waitress went to run it again and came back saying she could not find the card. Jermall was upset that his card was missing since it was a debit card tied to an account with a substantial amount of money." On February 2, 2022, Charlo was cleared of all charges. His version of events claim after the waitress lost his card, for an account in which he had a substantial amount of money in, he became upset and saw his ID in the check portfolio, which he then took, so it did not become lost.

Charlo was arrested on February 11, 2022, and charged with "Assault Causing Bodily Injury of a Family Member". The incident took place in September 2021. Previously, Charlo had been investigated in May 2020 following an "alleged aggravated assault incident", which also included a family member. The arrest affidavit read: "did then and there intentionally, knowingly, or recklessly cause bodily injury to (the alleged victim) by punching or grabbing him by his hair. It is further presented in and to said court that at the time of the offense alleged above, (the alleged victim) was a member of the defendant's family or household." He was arrested with one count of third-degree felony assault. Charlo was charged as a repeat offender following an incident which took place in Clark County, Nevada in 2015, where he was convicted. It was alleged he assaulted his 21-year-old nephew. On September 12, 2022, a Motion to Dismiss was filed by The State of Texas. The case was dismissed after the State was not able to prove beyond reasonable doubt.

On May 6, 2024, a road traffic accident occurred involving Charlo, which later saw him arrested and charged with three misdemeanour counts. According to reports, he was driving under the influence, fled from a police officer and fled the scene of the accident. According to TMZ, Charlo was driving a Lamborghini. He and the other driver had words before Charlo left the scene, only to be arrest a mile away at a red light. A blood test showed he was at .15, nearly twice the State limit. In September 2024, he was charged with DWI. His attorney Kent Schaffer stated Charlo would not have consumed any drugs as he was in training.

== Professional boxing record ==
34 fights	34 wins	0 losses
By knockout	23	0
By decision	11	0

No.	Result	Record	Opponent	Type	Round, time	Date	Location	Notes
34	Win	34–0	Thomas Lamanna	TKO	6 (12), 0:05	May 31, 2025	Michelob Ultra Arena, Paradise, Nevada, U.S.	Won vacant WBA Continental Americas Super Middleweight title
33	Win	33–0	José Benavidez Jr.	UD	10	Nov 25, 2023	Michelob Ultra Arena, Paradise, Nevada, U.S.	
32	Win	32–0	Juan Macias Montiel	UD	12	Jun 19, 2021	Toyota Center, Houston, Texas, U.S.	Retained WBC middleweight title
31	Win	31–0	Sergiy Derevyanchenko	UD	12	Sep 26, 2020	Mohegan Sun Arena, Uncasville, Connecticut, U.S.	Retained WBC middleweight title
30	Win	30–0	Dennis Hogan	TKO	7 (12), 0:28	Dec 7, 2019	Barclays Center, New York City, New York, U.S.	Retained WBC middleweight title
29	Win	29–0	Brandon Adams	UD	12	Jun 29, 2019	NRG Arena, Houston, Texas, U.S.	Retained WBC middleweight title
28	Win	28–0	Matt Korobov	UD	12	Dec 22, 2018	Barclays Center, New York City, New York, U.S.	Retained WBC interim middleweight title
27	Win	27–0	Hugo Centeno Jr.	KO	2 (12), 0:55	Apr 21, 2018	Barclays Center, New York City, New York, U.S.	Won vacant WBC interim middleweight title
26	Win	26–0	Jorge Sebastian Heiland	TKO	4 (12), 2:13	Jul 29, 2017	Barclays Center, New York City, New York, U.S.	
25	Win	25–0	Julian Williams	KO	5 (12), 2:06	Dec 10, 2016	Galen Center, Los Angeles, California, U.S.	Retained IBF light middleweight title
24	Win	24–0	Austin Trout	UD	12	May 21, 2016	The Cosmopolitan of Las Vegas, Paradise, Nevada, U.S.	Retained IBF light middleweight title
23	Win	23–0	Wilky Campfort	TKO	4 (12), 1:16	Nov 28, 2015	The Bomb Factory, Dallas, Texas, U.S.	Retained IBF light middleweight title
22	Win	22–0	Cornelius Bundrage	KO	3 (12), 2:33	Sep 12, 2015	Foxwoods Resort Casino, Ledyard, Connecticut, U.S.	Won IBF light middleweight title
21	Win	21–0	Michael Finney	UD	10	Mar 28, 2015	Pearl Concert Theater, Paradise, Nevada, U.S.	
20	Win	20–0	Lenny Bottai	KO	3 (12), 0:38	Dec 13, 2014	MGM Grand Garden Arena, Paradise, Nevada, U.S.	
19	Win	19–0	Norberto Gonzalez	TKO	7 (8), 1:23	Sep 11, 2014	The Joint, Paradise, Nevada, U.S.	
18	Win	18–0	Hector Munoz	RTD	4 (10) 3:00	Apr 26, 2014	StubHub Center, Carson, California, U.S.	
17	Win	17–0	Joseph De los Santos	KO	5 (8), 0:29	Dec 13, 2013	Fantasy Springs Resort Casino, Indio, California, U.S.	
16	Win	16–0	Rogelio De la Torre	TKO	7 (8), 1:50	Sep 12, 2013	MGM Grand Premier Ballroom, Paradise, Nevada, U.S.	
15	Win	15–0	Antwone Smith	KO	2 (10), 2:23	Aug 9, 2013	Fantasy Springs Resort Casino, Indio, California, U.S.	
14	Win	14–0	Luis Hernandez	TKO	2 (6), 2:26	Jun 1, 2013	BB&T Center, Sunrise, Florida, U.S.	
13	Win	13–0	Orlando Lora	RTD	4 (8), 3:00	Apr 20, 2013	Alamodome, San Antonio, Texas, U.S.	
12	Win	12–0	Gilbert Venegas	KO	3 (8), 1:24	Mar 2, 2013	Our Lady of the Lake University Gym, San Antonio, Texas, U.S.	
11	Win	11–0	Josh Williams	RTD	5 (8) 3:00	Jan 26, 2013	The Joint, Paradise, Nevada, U.S.	
10	Win	10–0	Edgar Perez	RTD	4 (8) 3:00	Dec 8, 2012	Business Expo Center, Anaheim, California, U.S.	
9	Win	9–0	Sean Rawley Wilson	TKO	5 (6), 2:21	Mar 24, 2012	Reliant Arena, Houston, Texas, U.S.	
8	Win	8–0	Eric Draper	KO	1 (6), 1:32	Sep 23, 2011	Hard Rock Live, Hollywood, Florida, U.S.	
7	Win	7–0	Deon Nash	RTD	2 (4), 0:10	Aug 28, 2010	Moody Gardens, Galveston, Texas, U.S.	
6	Win	6–0	Carlos Garcia	UD	4	Oct 24, 2009	Roberto Clemente Coliseum, San Juan, Puerto Rico	
5	Win	5–0	Deon Nash	UD	6	Jul 11, 2009	San Miguel Arena, Houston, Texas, U.S.	
4	Win	4–0	Terrell Davis	TKO	2 (4), 2:07	Jun 6, 2009	Convention Center, Washington, D.C., U.S.	
3	Win	3–0	Anthony Bowman	UD	4	Apr 25, 2009	Fitzgeralds Casino and Hotel, Tunica Resorts, Mississippi, U.S.	
2	Win	2–0	Mario Hernandez	UD	4	Oct 10, 2008	Desert Diamond Casino, Tucson, Arizona, U.S.	
1	Win	1–0	Cimarron Davis	TKO	2 (4), 0:47	Aug 12, 2008	Quick Trip Ballpark, Grand Prairie, Texas, U.S.	

== Titles in boxing ==
=== Major world titles ===
- IBF light middleweight champion (154 lbs)
- WBC middleweight champion (Note: Promoted from interim champion on June 26, 2019.) (160 lbs)

=== Interim world titles ===
- WBC interim middleweight champion (160 lbs)

=== Regional titles ===
- WBA Continental Americas Super Middleweight champion (168 lbs)

=== Honorary titles ===
- WBC Freedom 2021 champion

== See also ==
- List of world light-middleweight boxing champions
- List of world middleweight boxing champions

== Notes and references ==
=== References ===
Sporting positions
World boxing titles
Preceded by Cornelius Bundrage	IBF light middleweight champion September 12, 2015 – February 16, 2017; Vacated	Vacant Title next held by Jarrett Hurd
Vacant Title last held by Gennady Golovkin	WBC middleweight champion Interim title April 21, 2018 – June 26, 2019; Promoted	Vacant Title next held by Carlos Adames
Preceded by Canelo Álvarez promoted to Franchise champion	WBC middleweight champion June 26, 2019 – May 7, 2024; Stripped	Vacant Title next held by Carlos Adames
