= Brandon Adams (boxer) =

American boxer (born 1989)

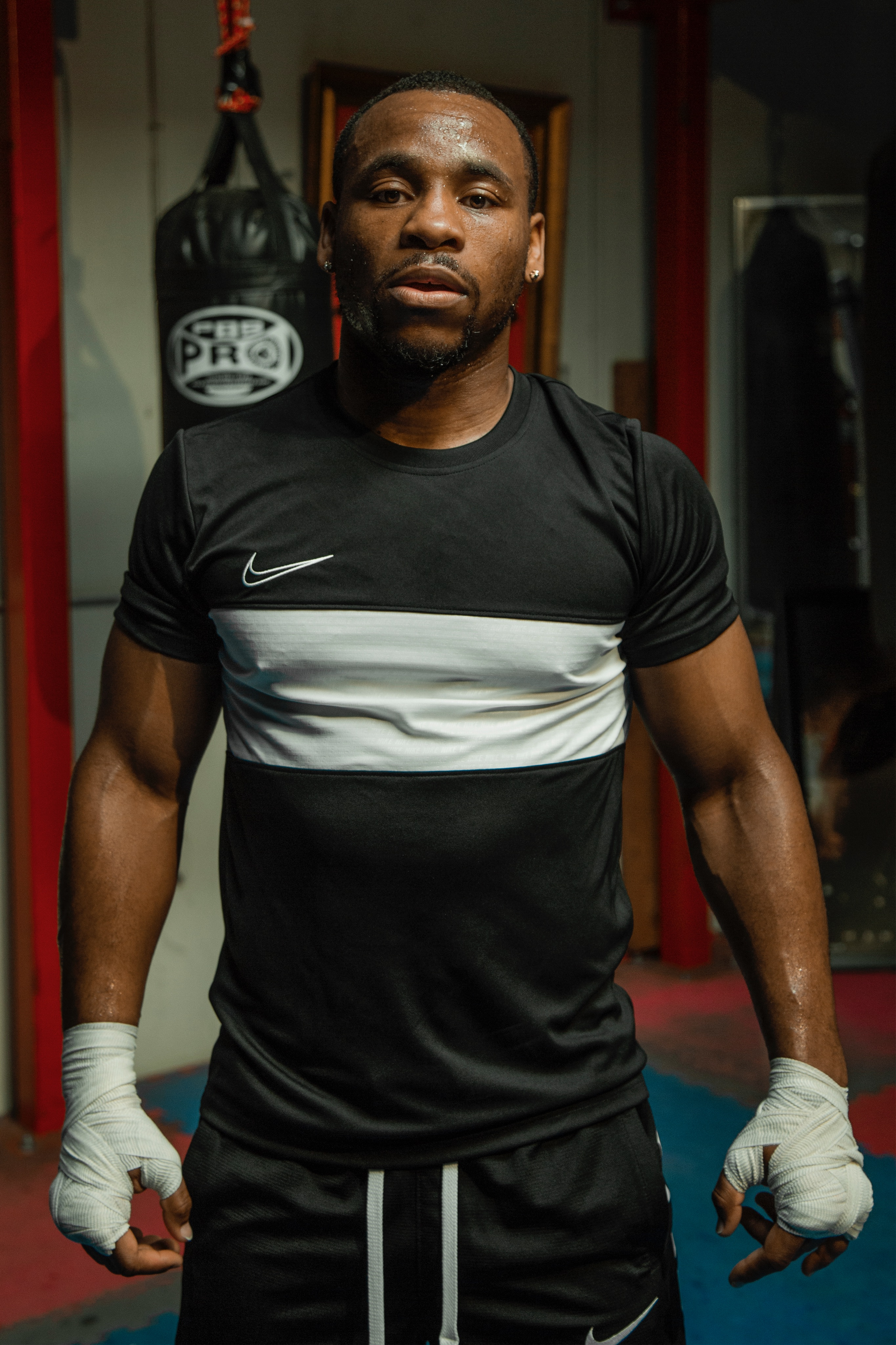
- Adams in 2019

Personal information
- Nickname: Cannon
- Born: July 31, 1989 (age 36) Los Angeles, California, U.S.
- Height: 5 ft 9 in (175 cm)
- Weight: Middleweight

Boxing career
- Reach: 70 in (178 cm)
- Stance: Orthodox

Boxing record
- Total fights: 30
- Wins: 26
- Win by KO: 16
- Losses: 4

Brandon Quincy Adams (born July 31, 1989) is an American professional boxer who challenged for the WBC middleweight title in 2019. He was the winner of season 5 of The Contender series.

== Early life ==
Adams was born on July 31, 1989, between Compton and Watts in Los Angeles, California. He fought against involvement with gangs and drugs early on in life, surviving through what he calls "faith and a courageous sense of humor." Eager to participate in sports as a youth, but shunned for his family's troubled reputation in the streets of Compton and Watts, Adams found a way around the hardships of the neighborhood by using the discipline of boxing as a way to better his opportunities in life and to defend himself. "I saw my older brothers get shot, lost best friends within 100 feet from where I lie my head," Adams explained. "I had to defend myself from being bullied because fighting was a reality of the streets. Being very small for my age, certainly the smallest of all my friends, I naturally had more to prove."

Quickly gaining a reputation after winning several backyard brawls, Brandon's neighbor "Big Al" took notice and brought him into the professional and legalized world of boxing. Introducing him into the "last old school boxing gym" in South Central Los Angeles, Big Al became Brandon's mentor and first trainer. "My neighbor Big Al saw my enthusiasm to box and make it out of the backyard, so he began taking me to the gym," Adams explained of his mentor. "Al introduced me to everyone in the gym, he had me do strength and conditioning in the same sessions as my training. He was a male figure that stepped in to try to mentor and help me, and I’m forever grateful."

== Career ==
In the same gym, Brandon eventually developed into a world class boxer under the tutelage of Hall of Fame trainer Dub Huntley, a trainer portrayed in the film Million Dollar Baby. "Dub would say I need to turn pro ASAP. I started training at 19, my first amateur fight was at 20, My first professional fight at 21. A feat nearly unheard of in the boxing industry. I was moving really fast because they believed in me," Adams said. "I went pro inside of two years, which is very unusual. Dub had multiple world champions and when he saw me train, he said I was ready to turn pro, he told me I would be a world champion."

After years of victories, Adams earned his nickname "The Cannon," dominating several local showcases and accumulating an undefeated record in fights across the U.S. and Mexico. Gaining the attention of the boxing community, Adams was requested for training camps by boxing contenders Shawn Porter, Gennady Golovkin and Antonio Margarito. In 2013, he signed with Banner Promotions and in 2015, he participated in ESPN's nationally televised annual Boxcino Tournament.

He ultimately finished runner-up in the tournament after a false blood doping accusation severely affected his training regiment, his ability to meet the required weight class, and his energy during the fight. A defeated fighter had falsely accused him of taking performance enhancers, which required Adams to be cleared by the Boxing Commission. After their independent blood tests cleared him to fight, he only had two days to lose twelve pounds. He accomplished this through the usage of sweat creams, sauna suits, and running. The extreme measures depleted his strength and caused him to lose the second round.

Relegating to full recovery mode over the next few years, in 2018 Brandon was invited to join season 5 of the EPIX network television show The Contender. The show revived his career, leading to his victory over Shane Mosley Jr. for the show finale and championship. Unfortunately, Big Al died from a heart attack during this time. Although severely affected by Big Al's death, Adams fought on 29 June 2019 against Jermall Charlo in Houston, Texas. Airing on Showtime with big box office appeal, the fight marked Brandon's national debut with over one million expected viewers. Charlo won the fight on points, retaining the WBC middleweight title.

In September 2025, Adams convincingly beat super welterweight contender Serhii Bohachuck for the second time. While the first victory was a come-from-behind knockout, the second victory was by a wide decision, with one judge scoring it 91-99, and the other two 92-98. Bohachuck came into the fight ranked as number one by the WBC at super welterweight and in the top five of the WBO and IBF rankings.

Adams was scheduled to face Caoimhín Agyarko in an eliminator for a shot at the IBF super-welterweight title at the Toyota Arena in Ontario, California, on 18 April 2026. The fight was cancelled after Adams collapsed in his hotel room and was taken to hospital before the weigh-in.

== Professional boxing record ==
| 30 fights | 26 wins | 4 losses |
|---|---|---|
| By knockout | 16 | 1 |
| By decision | 10 | 3 |

| No. | Result | Record | Opponent | Type | Round, time | Date | Location | Notes |
|---|---|---|---|---|---|---|---|---|
| 30 | Win | 26–4 | Serhii Bohachuk | UD | 10 | Sep 13, 2025 | Allegiant Stadium, Paradise, Nevada, U.S. | |
| 29 | Loss | 25–4 | Andreas Katzourakis | SD | 10 | Nov 22, 2024 | Corey Studios at Corey Tower, Atlanta, Georgia, U.S. | |
| 28 | Win | 25–3 | Francisco Verón | UD | 10 | Aug 30, 2024 | Overtime Elite Arena, Atlanta, Georgia, U.S. | |
| 27 | Win | 24–3 | Ismael Villarreal | KO | 3 (10), 2:59 | Apr 19, 2024 | Overtime Elite Arena, Atlanta, Georgia, U.S. | |
| 26 | Win | 23–3 | Serhii Bohachuk | TKO | 8 (10), 2:47 | Mar 4, 2021 | Municipal Boxing Gym Felix Pagan Pintor, Guaynabo, Puerto Rico | |
| 25 | Win | 22–3 | Sanny Duversonne | UD | 12 | Dec 3, 2020 | Wild Card Boxing, Los Angeles, California, U.S. | |
| 24 | Loss | 21–3 | Jermall Charlo | UD | 12 | Jun 29, 2019 | NRG Arena, Houston, Texas, U.S. | For WBC Middleweight title |
| 23 | Win | 21–2 | Shane Mosley Jr. | UD | 10 | Nov 9, 2018 | Kia Forum, Inglewood, California, U.S. | The Contender 5: Finals |
| 22 | Win | 20–2 | Eric Walker | MD | 5 | May 22, 2018 | LADC Studios, Los Angeles, California, U.S. | The Contender 5: Semi finals |
| 21 | Win | 19–2 | Ievgen Khytrov | UD | 5 | May 16, 2018 | LADC Studios, Los Angeles, California, U.S. | The Contender 5: Quarter finals |
| 20 | Win | 18–2 | Tyrone Brunson | KO | 4 (5), 2:00 | May 10, 2018 | LADC Studios, Los Angeles, California, U.S. | The Contender 5: preliminary round |
| 19 | Loss | 17–2 | John Thompson | TKO | 2 (10), 2:18 | May 22, 2015 | Omega Products International, Corona, California, U.S. | For NABA and vacant WBO inter-continental super welterweight title |
| 18 | Win | 17–1 | Vito Gasparyan | TKO | 7 (6), 0:35 | Apr 10, 2015 | Sands Bethlehem Event Center, Bethlehem, Pennsylvania, U.S. | |
| 17 | Win | 16–1 | Alex Perez | TKO | 5 (6), 2:47 | Feb 13, 2015 | Mohegan Sun Arena, Uncasville, Connecticut, U.S. | |
| 16 | Win | 15–1 | Lekan Byfield | TKO | 2 (8), 1:58 | Jan 16, 2015 | Turning Stone Resort & Casino, Verona, New York, U.S. | |
| 15 | Loss | 14–1 | Willie Monroe Jr. | UD | 10 | May 23, 2014 | Turning Stone Resort & Casino, Verona, New York, U.S. | For vacant WBA, NABA, and vacant WBO NABO middleweight titles |
| 14 | Win | 14–0 | Raymond Gatica | SD | 8 | Apr 18, 2014 | Turning Stone Resort & Casino, Verona, New York, U.S. | |
| 13 | Win | 13–0 | Daniel Edouard | RTD | 4 (6), 3:00 | Feb 28, 2014 | Horseshoe Casino, Hammond, Indiana, U.S. | |
| 12 | Win | 12–0 | Francisco Rios Gil | TKO | 2 (6), 1:58 | Sep 26, 2013 | Four Points Sheraton Hotel, San Diego, California, U.S. | |
| 11 | Win | 11–0 | Daniel Yocupicio Mendez | KO | 4 (4), 1:33 | Jul 17, 2013 | Salon Las Pulgas, Tijuana, Mexico | |
| 10 | Win | 10–0 | Rafael Ortiz Moreno | TKO | 3 (4), 1:44 | May 1, 2013 | Salon Las Pulgas, Tijuana, Mexico | |
| 9 | Win | 9–0 | Edgar Bojorquez | KO | 2 (4), 1:53 | Dec 19, 2012 | Salon Las Pulgas, Tijuana, Mexico | |
| 8 | Win | 8–0 | Yair Aguiar | KO | 2 (6), 2:52 | Nov 2, 2012 | Four Points Sheraton Hotel, San Diego, California, U.S. | |
| 7 | Win | 7–0 | Moses Alvizo | UD | 4 | Aug 18, 2012 | Hollywood Park Casino, Inglewood, California, U.S. | |
| 6 | Win | 6–0 | Cleven Ishe | UD | 4 | Jun 7, 2012 | Orange County Fairgrounds, Costa Mesa, California, U.S. | |
| 5 | Win | 5–0 | Dave Courchaine | KO | 1 (4), 1:54 | Jan 21, 2012 | Emerald Queen Casino, Tacoma, Washington, U.S. | |
| 4 | Win | 4–0 | Raymundo Inda | KO | 4 (4), 2:00 | Nov 4, 2011 | DoubleTree Hotel, Ontario, California, U.S. | |
| 3 | Win | 3–0 | John Worthy | UD | 4 | Sep 30, 2011 | Orange County Fairgrounds, Costa Mesa, California, U.S. | |
| 2 | Win | 2–0 | Miguel Lopez | KO | 4 (4), 2:09 | May 12, 2011 | Hollywood Park Casino, Inglewood, California, U.S. | |
| 1 | Win | 1–0 | Erin Beach | UD | 4 | Mar 31, 2011 | Four Points Sheraton Hotel, San Diego, California, U.S. | |

Sporting positions
| Preceded by Serhii Bohachuk | WBC Continental Americas super welterweight champion March 4, 2021 – February, 2022; Vacated | Vacant Title last held by Carlos Ocampo |
