= Andreas Katzourakis =

Greek boxer (born 1997)

Personal information
- Nickname: Katz
- Born: Andreas Katzourakis; September 12, 1997 (age 28) Athens, Greece
- Height: 5 ft 10 in (178 cm)
- Weight: Light middleweight; Middleweight

Boxing career
- Stance: Orthodox

Boxing record
- Total fights: 17
- Wins: 17
- Win by KO: 11
- Losses: 0
- Draws: 0

Andreas Katzourakis is a Greek professional boxer. He is a former WBA Continental North American light middleweight champion.

== Amateur career ==
Katzourakis began competing in kickboxing at the age of five at the direction of his father, a former kickboxer. After competing in hundreds of amateur bouts in kickboxing and point fighting at both the national and international level, Andreas turned full athletic attention to boxing at 15. Katzourakis had a brief career as an amateur boxer in Greece. As an amateur, he won four Greek National Championships and finished with a combined record of 21–0 with 16 forced stoppages within his home country.

== Professional career ==
Katzourakis made his professional debut on 7 June 2018 at The Hangar in Costa Mesa, California, knocking out Chukwuka Willis in the first round of a scheduled four-round bout. In his fourth professional fight, Katzourakis took on former world title challenger Walter Wright at Quiet Cannon Country Club in Montebello, California on 26 April 2019. He won the six-round fight via unanimous decision.

On 6 October 2022, Katzourakis took on veteran fighter Cameron Krael in Houston, Texas. Katzourakis won the fight via technical knockout after Krael's corner stopped the fight after five one-sided rounds.

On 22 November 2024, he defeated WBA Continental North American super-welterweight champion Brandon Adams by split decision at Corey Studios at Corey Tower in Atlanta, Georgia, to win his first title as a professional.

Katzourakis faced fellow unbeaten boxer Roberto Cruz Jr at Red Owl Boxing Arena in Houston, Texas, on 9 May 2025, winning via technical knockout in the seventh of their 10-round scheduled contest.

After more than a year away from the competitive boxing ring, Katzourakis returned with a unanimous decision win over another previously undefeated fighter, Misael Rodríguez, at the Meta Apex in Enterprise, Nevada, on 10 May 2026.

== Professional boxing record ==
17 fights	17 wins	0 losses
By knockout	11	0
By decision	6	0

No.	Result	Record	Opponent	Type	Round, time	Date	Location	Notes
17	Win	17–0	Misael Rodríguez	UD	10	10 May 2026	Meta Apex, Enterprise, Nevada, U.S.	
16	Win	16–0	Roberto Cruz Jr	TKO	7 (10), 2:37	9 May 2025	Red Owl Boxing Arena, Houston, Texas, U.S.	
15	Win	15–0	Brandon Adams	SD	10	22 Nov 2024	Corey Studios at Corey Tower, Atlanta, Georgia, U.S.	Won WBA Continental North American super-welterweight title
14	Win	14–0	Robert Terry	SD	10	30 Aug 2024	Overtime Elite Arena, Atlanta, Georgia, U.S.	
13	Win	13–0	Kudratillo Abdukakhorov	MD	10	31 May 2024	Red Owl Boxing Arena, Houston, Texas, U.S.	
12	Win	12–0	Corey Caad	TKO	3 (8), 3:00	3 Dec 2023	GSH Event Center, Houston, Texas, U.S.	
11	Win	11–0	Raphael Igbokwe	TKO	8 (8), 2:15	25 Aug 2023	Overtime Elite Arena, Atlanta, Georgia, U.S.	
10	Win	10–0	Marcelo Fabian Bzowski	TKO	5 (6), 1:42	17 Jun 2023	GSH Event Center, Houston, Texas, U.S.	
9	Win	9–0	Rodrigo Octavio Gonzalez	TKO	6 (8), 2:50	1 Apr 2023	Summer Creek High School Arena, Houston, Texas, U.S.	
8	Win	8–0	Cameron Krael	RTD	5 (8), 3:00	6 Oct 2022	ULH Event Center, Houston, Texas, U.S.	
7	Win	7–0	Isiah Jones	UD	6	17 Jun 2022	Bayou Event Center, Houston, Texas, U.S.	
6	Win	6–0	Brandon Baue	TKO	3 (6), 1:41	12 Dec 2020	Airport Hilton, Miami, Florida, U.S.	
5	Win	5–0	Edward Brown	TKO	2 (6), 2:45	13 Dec 2019	Florida National Armory, Miramar, Florida, U.S.	
4	Win	4–0	Walter Wright	UD	6	26 Apr 2019	Quiet Cannon Country Club, Montebello, California, U.S.	
3	Win	3–0	Gilberto Pereira dos Santos	KO	3 (4), 2:58	15 Mar 2019	Marconi Automative Museum, Tustin, California, U.S.	
2	Win	2–0	Christian Aguirre	KO	3 (6), 2:04	6 Dec 2018	The Hangar, Costa Mesa, California, U.S.	
1	Win	1–0	Chukwuka Willis	KO	1 (4), 2:37	7 Jun 2018	The Hangar, Costa Mesa, California, U.S.	
