= Matthew Macklin =

British-Irish boxer (born 1982)

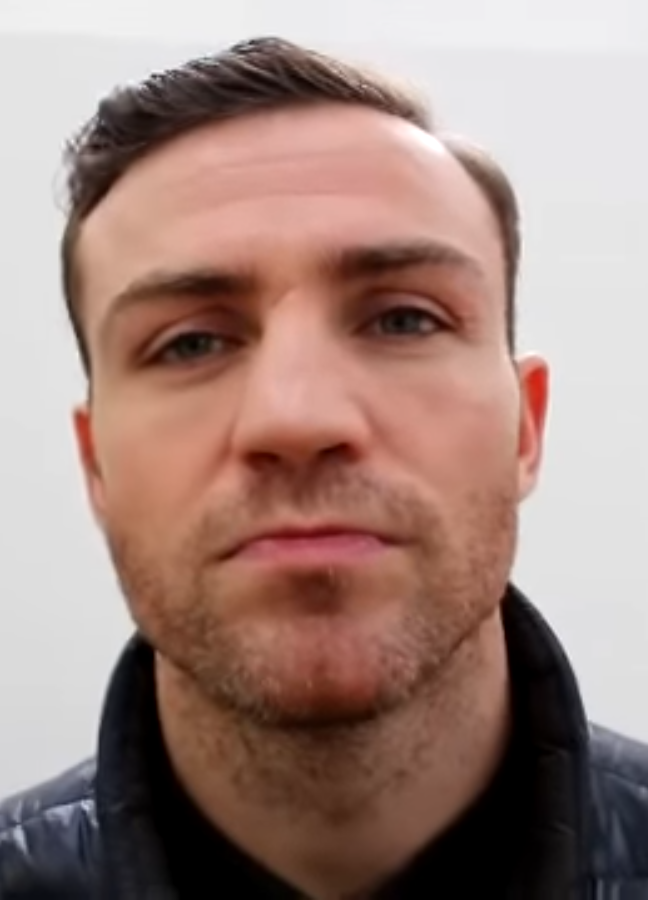
- Macklin in 2015

Personal information
- Nicknames: Mack the Knife; Tipperary Tornado; The Roscommon Rock
- Nationality: Irish; British
- Born: 14 May 1982 (age 44) Birmingham, West Midlands, England
- Height: 5 ft 10 in (178 cm)
- Weight: Welterweight; Light-middleweight; Middleweight

Boxing career
- Reach: 71 in (180 cm)
- Stance: Orthodox

Boxing record
- Total fights: 41
- Wins: 35
- Win by KO: 22
- Losses: 6

Matthew Macklin (born 14 May 1982) is a British-Irish former professional boxer who competed from 2001 to 2016, and has since worked as a boxing manager and commentator. He challenged three times for middleweight world titles between 2011 and 2013, and held multiple regional championships at that weight: the Irish title from 2005 to 2006, the British title in 2009, and the European title from 2009 to 2011.

== Early life ==
Macklin was born in Birmingham, England, to Irish parents, his father being from County Roscommon and his mother born in Birmingham from County Tipperary. He is a dual citizen and travels on an Irish passport.

Macklin and his brother Seamus, also a boxer, spent entire summers and much of their youth in their mother's native county. It was there that he learned how to play one of Ireland's national sports, hurling, and he is still an avid supporter of Tipperary today. Macklin is a close friend of now retired hurler Eoin Kelly. Macklin attends the Poc fada and other GAA events when Tipperary are playing.

Following his education at the independent Solihull School, at the age of 18 and whilst studying law at Coventry University as an amateur boxer, Macklin won the 2001 national senior ABA welterweight title for the Small Heath Boxing Club by beating Justin Turley in the final.

== Professional career ==
=== Debut fight ===
Macklin left the amateur ranks and turned professional in September 2001, winning his first fight at the Bellahouston Sports Centre, Glasgow, Scotland, against previously undefeated Ram Singh in a first-round knockout.

=== Macklin vs. Jamie Moore ===
In September 2006, Macklin was defeated by Jamie Moore for the British light middleweight title in a fight which took place at the George Carnell Leisure Centre, Davyhulme, Manchester, England.

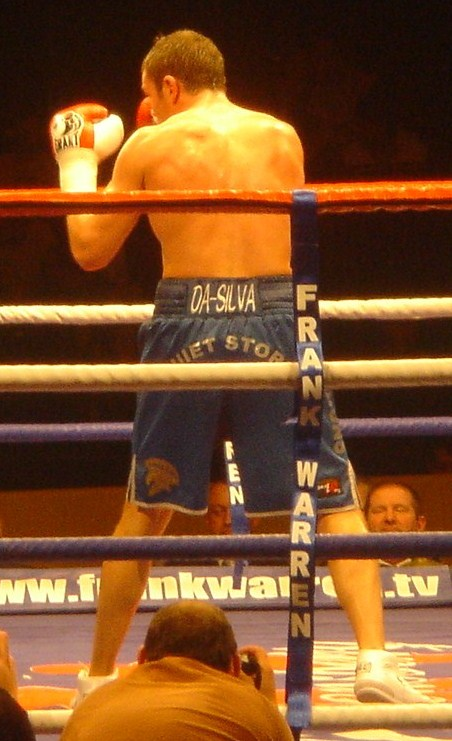
Macklin vs. Francis Cheka, 2008

In December 2009, Macklin moved closer to a world title shot with a points victory over Rafa Sosa Pintos at the National Stadium in Dublin.

=== European middleweight champion ===
Macklin beat Finnish Super-fighter Amin Asikainen by first round knockout at the Manchester Velodrome, England on 25 September 2009 for the vacant European middleweight title.

Macklin was later forced to vacate his European title. However, he would get in first for the fight for the vacant title. A fight against Englishman Darren Barker was arranged for 18 September 2010, on Frank Warren's Magnificent Seven bill on Sky Box Office. Barker was forced to pull out of the contest through injury and was replaced by Georgian boxer Shalva Jomardashvili. Macklin won the fight via a technical knock out in the sixth round.

=== World title challenges ===
Mathew fought WBA Middleweight champion Felix Sturm on 25 June 2011. The fight ended in a split decision win for Sturm.

On 17 March 2012, otherwise known as St. Patrick's Day, Macklin met WBC Diamond Middleweight champion Sergio Martinez at Madison Square Garden, New York City. Macklin would go on to lose after his corner retired him on his stool after round 11, a round in which Macklin was dropped twice by straight lefts from the southpaw Martinez. See Sergio Martinez vs. Matthew Macklin

=== Career rebuilding ===
Macklin came back on 15 September 2012, and fought on HBO World Championship Boxing PPV on the undercard of the WBC World Middleweight Title fight between Julio César Chávez, Jr. and Sergio Martínez in the Thomas & Mack Center in Paradise, Nevada. Macklin fought former light-middleweight world champion Joachim Alcine of Canada and won with a technical knockout in the first round. On 30 June 2013, he suffered another setback with a loss to Gennady Golovkin by knockout in the third round when Golovkin landed a left hook to the liver.

=== Retirement ===
Follow a knockout loss to Argentine boxer Jorge Sebastian Heiland, Macklin took some time off from the sport. He set up Macklin's Gym Marbella in Marbella, Spain, with Daniel Kinahan. Macklin returned the following year and took part in a couple of warm up fights, before dropping down a weight division to defeat Jason Welborn. He won by unanimous decision over 10 rounds in his home town of Birmingham. Macklin then defeated former world title challenger Brian Rose by a 12 round majority decision on the Anthony Joshua-Charles Martin undercard. Shortly after the Rose fight, Macklin announced his retirement in May 2016.

In 2017 Macklin announced that his partner Kinahan would be stepping back from boxing promotion due to bad publicity. The gym rebranded as MTK - Mack the Knife, as MGM Resorts International filed a trademark lawsuit over its use of the 'MGM' initials. MTK was bought out by external investors, with Matthew Macklin remaining on the board in an advisory capacity.

He became a pundit for Sky Sports.

In April 2022, Macklin was prevented from boarding a flight to the United States at a London airport because of links to Daniel Kinahan. He was travelling to Las Vegas to cover a fight between Shakur Stevenson and Óscar Valdez on 30 April.

== Professional boxing record ==
41 fights	35 wins	6 losses
By knockout	22	4
By decision	13	2

No.	Result	Record	Opponent	Type	Round, time	Date	Location	Notes
41	Win	35–6	Brian Rose	MD	12	9 Apr 2016	The O2 Arena, London, England	
40	Win	34–6	Jason Welborn	UD	10	17 Oct 2015	Barclaycard Arena, Birmingham, England	Won vacant WBC International light-middleweight title
39	Win	33–6	Chris Herrmann	KO	1 (8), 1:44	28 Aug 2015	H10 Andalucía Plaza, Marbella, Spain	
38	Win	32–6	Sandor Micsko	KO	2 (8), 1:28	9 May 2015	Barclaycard Arena, Birmingham, England	
37	Loss	31–6	Jorge Sebastian Heiland	KO	10 (12), 0:42	15 Nov 2014	3Arena, Dublin, Ireland	For WBC International middleweight title
36	Win	31–5	Jose Yebes	MD	8	27 Sep 2014	Kiel, Germany	
35	Win	30–5	Lamar Russ	UD	10	7 Dec 2013	Boardwalk Hall, Atlantic City, New Jersey, US	
34	Loss	29–5	Gennady Golovkin	KO	3 (12), 1:22	29 Jun 2013	Foxwoods Resort Casino, Ledyard, Connecticut, US	For WBA and IBO middleweight titles
33	Win	29–4	Joachim Alcine	KO	1 (10), 2:36	15 Sep 2012	Thomas & Mack Center, Paradise, Nevada, US	
32	Loss	28–4	Sergio Martínez	RTD	11 (12), 3:00	17 Mar 2012	The Theater at Madison Square Garden, New York City, New York, US	For The Ring middleweight title
31	Loss	28–3	Felix Sturm	SD	12	25 Jun 2011	Lanxess Arena, Cologne, Germany	For WBA middleweight title
30	Win	28–2	Ruben Varon	UD	12	11 Dec 2010	Echo Arena, Liverpool, England	Retained European middleweight title
29	Win	27–2	Shalva Jomardashvili	RTD	6 (12), 0:02	18 Sep 2010	LG Arena, Birmingham, England	Won vacant European middleweight title
28	Win	26–2	Rafael Sosa Pintos	PTS	10	5 Dec 2009	National Stadium, Dublin, Ireland	
27	Win	25–2	Amin Asikainen	TKO	1 (12), 2:34	25 Sep 2009	Manchester Velodrome, Manchester, England	Won vacant European middleweight title
26	Win	24–2	Wayne Elcock	TKO	3 (12), 0:59	14 Mar 2009	Aston Villa Events Centre, Birmingham, England	Won British middleweight title
25	Win	23–2	Geard Ajetović	PTS	10	31 Oct 2008	Aston Villa Leisure Centre, Birmingham, England	
24	Win	22–2	Francis Cheka	PTS	10	6 Sep 2008	MEN Arena, Manchester, England	
23	Win	21–2	Yori Boy Campas	PTS	10	22 Mar 2008	National Stadium, Dublin, Ireland	
22	Win	20–2	Alessio Furlan	TKO	8 (10), 1:28	20 Oct 2007	National Stadium, Dublin, Ireland	
21	Win	19–2	Darren Rhodes	KO	4 (8), 2:25	25 Aug 2007	Point Theatre, Dublin, Ireland	
20	Win	18–2	Anatoliy Udalov	KO	1 (8), 2:24	20 Jul 2007	Civic Hall, Wolverhampton, England	
19	Loss	17–2	Jamie Moore	KO	10 (12), 1:29	29 Sep 2006	George H Carnall Leisure Centre, Manchester, England	For British light-middleweight title
18	Win	17–1	Marcin Piatkowski	TKO	4 (8), 2:17	1 Jun 2006	Aston Villa Leisure Centre, Birmingham, England	
17	Win	16–1	Alexey Chirkov	KO	1 (10), 2:44	26 Nov 2005	Hallam FM Arena, Sheffield, England	
16	Win	15–1	Anthony Little	TKO	2 (8), 2:20	28 Oct 2005	Alhambra Arena, Philadelphia, Pennsylvania, US	
15	Win	14–1	Leo Ladaut	TKO	3 (8), 1:55	4 Aug 2005	Borgata, Atlantic City, New Jersey, US	
14	Win	13–1	Michael Monaghan	KO	5 (10), 1:28	14 May 2005	National Stadium, Dublin, Ireland	Won vacant Irish middleweight title
13	Win	12–1	Ojay Abrahams	PTS	4	12 Jun 2004	MEN Arena, Manchester, England	
12	Win	11–1	Scott Dixon	RTD	5 (8), 3:00	24 Apr 2004	Rivermead Leisure Centre, Reading, England	
11	Win	10–1	Dean Walker	KO	1 (6), 1:25	21 Feb 2004	National Ice Rink, Cardiff, Wales	
10	Loss	9–1	Andrew Facey	PTS	10	6 Nov 2003	Goresbrook Leisure Center, London, England	For vacant English light-middleweight title
9	Win	9–0	Paul Denton	PTS	6	24 May 2003	York Hall, London, England	
8	Win	8–0	Ruslan Yakupov	PTS	6	15 Feb 2003	Wembley Conference Centre, London, England	
7	Win	7–0	Leonti Vorontsuk	TKO	5 (6), 1:11	28 Sep 2002	MEN Arena, Manchester, England	
6	Win	6–0	Guy Alton	TKO	3 (4), 1:20	1 Jun 2002	MEN Arena, Manchester, England	
5	Win	5–0	Ilia Spasov	KO	3 (4), 2:35	20 Apr 2002	International Arena, Cardiff, Wales	
4	Win	4–0	David Kirk	PTS	4	11 Mar 2002	Kelvin Hall, Glasgow, Scotland	
3	Win	3–0	Dmitri Protkunas	RTD	2 (4), 3:00	9 Feb 2002	MEN Arena, Manchester, England	
2	Win	2–0	Cristian Hodorogea	KO	1 (4), 1:36	15 Dec 2001	Wembley Conference Centre, London, England	
1	Win	1–0	Ram Singh	TKO	1 (4), 1:52	17 Nov 2001	Bellahouston Leisure Centre, Glasgow, Scotland	

Sporting positions
Regional boxing titles
Vacant Title last held by Darren Sweeney	Irish middleweight champion 14 May 2005 – June 2006; Vacated	Vacant Title next held by Jim Rock
Vacant Title last held by Wayne Elcock	British middleweight champion 14 March 2009 – November 2009; Vacated	Vacant Title next held by Darren Barker
Vacant Title last held by Khoren Gevor	European middleweight champion 25 September 2009 – April 2011; Vacated	Vacant Title next held by Darren Barker
Vacant Title last held by Carson Jones	WBC International super-welterweight champion 17 October 2015 – April 2016; Vacated	Vacant Title next held by Sergio Garcia
