= Misael Rodríguez =

Mexican boxer (born 1994)

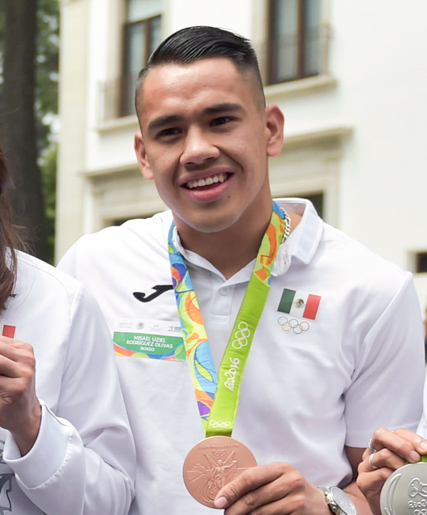
- Rodríguez in 2016

Personal information
- Born: Misael Uziel Rodríguez Olivas; 7 April 1994 (age 32) Ciénega de Ceniceros, Matamoros, Chihuahua, Mexico
- Height: 5 ft 11 in (180 cm)
- Weight: Middleweight

Boxing career

Boxing record
- Total fights: 17
- Wins: 16
- Win by KO: 8
- Losses: 1
Medal record
Men's amateur boxing
Representing Mexico
Olympic Games
Bronze medal – third place	2016 Rio de Janeiro	Middleweight
Pan American Games
Bronze medal – third place	2015 Toronto	Middleweight
Central American and Caribbean Games
Silver medal – second place	2014 Veracruz	Middleweight

Misael Uziel Rodríguez Olivas (Note: In this Spanish name, the first or paternal surname is Rodríguez and the second or maternal family name is Olivas.) (born 7 April 1994) is a Mexican professional boxer. He won a bronze medal at the 2016 Summer Olympics.

== Career ==
Rodríguez competed in the World Series of Boxing between 2014 and 2016. He wasn't successful, losing 9 of 12 bouts and being TKO'd by Arlen López in a May 2016 fight. Rodríguez won a bronze medal at the 2015 Pan American Games, beating Anthony Campbell before losing to Jorge Vivas in the semi-finals.

He competed in the men's middleweight event at the 2016 Summer Olympics. Rodríguez won three bouts before losing to silver medalist Bektemir Melikuziev in the semi-finals, winning a bronze medal.

In 2017, he turned professional, signing with Richard Schaefer. Rodríguez's manager is former Olympian and world champion Abner Mares.

Rodríguez won his 16th successive fight since turning professional when his opponent, fellow unbeaten boxer Austin Deanda, retired on the advice of the ringside doctor at the end of the fourth of their scheduled 10-round contest at Meta Apex in Enterprise, Nevada, USA, on 23 January 2026.

Fighting at the Meta Apex again, he lost his unbeaten professional record when he suffered a unanimous decision defeat against Andreas Katzourakis on 10 May 2026.

== Personal life ==
Rodríguez's cousin is UFC fighter Yair Rodríguez.

== Professional boxing record ==
17 fights	16 wins	1 loss
By knockout	8	0
By decision	8	1

No.	Result	Record	Opponent	Type	Round, time	Date	Location	Notes
17	Loss	16–1	(Greece) Andreas Katzourakis	UD	10	10 May 2026	(United States) Meta Apex, Enterprise, Nevada, U.S.	
16	Win	16–0	(United States) Austin Deanda	RTD	4 (10), 3:00	23 Jan 2026	(United States) Meta Apex, Enterprise, Nevada, U.S.	
15	Win	15–0	(Mexico) Omar Chavez	UD	10	25 Jan 2025	San Luis Potosí, San Luis Potosí, Mexico	
14	Win	14–0	(Mexico) Ricardo Banuelos Cernas	UD	8	3 Jun 2023	Chihuahua, Mexico	
13	Win	13–0	(Mexico) Aaron Rocha Guerrero	UD	8	4 Mar 2023	Polideportivo Juan S. Millan, Culiacan, Mexico	
12	Win	12–0	(Mexico) Eleazar Valenzuela Carrillo	TKO	3 (8), 1:01	30 Sep 2022	Culiacan, Mexico	
11	Win	11–0	(Mexico) Jesus Acosta Zazueta	RTD	6 (8), 3:00	15 Jul 2022	Polideportivo Juan S. Millan, Culiacan, Mexico	
10	Win	10–0	(United States) Brandon Maddox	KO	3 (8), 1:13	28 Sep 2019	(United States) Staples Center, Los Angeles, California, U.S.	
9	Win	9–0	(Mexico) Josue Castaneda Perez	UD	6	26 Jan 2019	Lienzo Charro, Ciudad Guzman, Mexico	
8	Win	8–0	(Mexico) Uriel Gonzalez	UD	6	26 May 2018	Teatro Moliere, Mexico City, Mexico	
7	Win	7–0	(Argentina) Jonathan Geronimo Barbadillo	TKO	2 (6), 1:00	3 Mar 2018	Gimnasio Rodrigo M. Quevedo, Chihuahua, Chihuahua, Mexico	
6	Win	6–0	(Cuba) Yunier Calzada	UD	6	15 Dec 2017	(United States) Pioneer Event Center, Lancaster, California, U.S.	
5	Win	5–0	(Mexico) Isaac Mendez	KO	2 (6), 1:47	4 Nov 2017	Gimnasio Municipal "Jose Neri Santos", Ciudad Juarez, Chihuahua, Mexico	
4	Win	4–0	(United States) Cesar Hernandez	UD	6	14 Oct 2017	(United States) StubHub Center, Carson, California, U.S.	
3	Win	3–0	(United States) Race Sawyer	TKO	2 (4), 2:12	23 Sep 2017	(United States) Alamodome, San Antonio, Texas, U.S.	
2	Win	2–0	(Colombia) José David Mosquera	KO	2 (6), 1:50	22 Jul 2017	Lienzo charro, Parral, Chihuahua, Mexico	
1	Win	1–0	(United States) Brian True	UD	4	9 Apr 2017	(United States) The Novo by Microsoft, Los Angeles, California, U.S.	
