= The Contender season 5 =

The Contender
- Season 5
- No. of episodes: 12

Release
- Original network: Epix
- Original release: August 24 – November 9, 2018

Season chronology
- ← Previous; The Contender 4

The fifth season of The Contender was recorded in Los Angeles, California and premiered on Epix on August 24, 2018. The series was on its fourth network, with the first season being broadcast on NBC, the second and third seasons on ESPN, and the fourth season on Versus.

== Contestants ==
The following 16 fighters, hailing from around the globe, were selected to take part in the fifth Contender Tournament which took place in the Middleweight division.

Contestant	Hometown	Record	TC Record	Link
Brandon Adams	Los Angeles, California	17–2	4–0	
Tyrone Brunson	Philadelphia, Pennsylvania	26–6–2	0–1	
Quatavious Cash	Las Vegas, Nevada	10–0	0–1	
Morgan Fitch	New Orleans, Louisiana	18–1–1	0–1	
Marcos Hernandez	Fresno, California	11–1–1	1–0	
John Jackson	St. Thomas, U.S. Virgin Islands	20–3	0–1	
Ievgen Khytrov	Brooklyn, New York	16–1	1–1	
Devaun Lee	Jamaica Queens, New York	10–3–1	0–1	
Malcolm McAllister	Long Beach, California	9–1	0–1	
Michael Moore	Cleveland, Ohio	15–1	2–2	
Shane Mosley Jr.	Pomona, California	10–2	3–1	
Lamar Russ	Wilmington, North Carolina	17–2	0–1	
Gerald Sherrell	Pittsburgh, Pennsylvania	8–0	1–1	
John Thompson	Newark, New Jersey	18–3	1–1	
Daniel Valdivia	Tulare, California	14–2	0–2	
Eric Walker	Plaquemine, Louisiana	15–1	3–1	

== Crew ==
Crew Member	Job
Andre Ward	Host
Dean Stone	Ring Announcer
Freddie Roach	Blue Team Trainer
Naazim Richardson	Gold Team Trainer

== Fight results ==
Fight 1 – Episode 1 (August 24, 2018)
Weight class				Method	Round	Time	Notes
Middleweight	(United States) John Thompson (Blue)	def.	(United States) Lamar Russ (Gold)	RTD	2 (5)	3:00
Fight 2 – Episode 2 (August 31, 2018)
Weight class				Method	Round	Time	Notes
Middleweight	(United States) Eric Walker (Blue)	def.	(United States Virgin Islands) John Jackson (Gold)	Decision (unanimous): 48–46, 49–45, 50–44	5
Fight 3 – Episode 3 (September 7, 2018)
Weight class				Method	Round	Time	Notes
Middleweight	(United States) Michael Moore (Blue)	def.	(United States) Malcolm McAllister (Gold)	Decision (unanimous): 50–45, 50–45, 48–47	5
Fight 4 – Episode 4 (September 14, 2018)
Weight class				Method	Round	Time	Notes
Middleweight	(United States) Gerald Sherrell (Blue)	def.	(United States) Quatavious Cash (Gold)	TKO	3 (5)	1:06
Fight 5 – Episode 5 (September 21, 2018)
Weight class				Method	Round	Time	Notes
Middleweight	(United States) Marcos Hernandez (Blue)	def.	(Mexico) Daniel Valdivia (Gold)	Decision (split): 48–47, 47–48, 48–47	5
Fight 6 – Episode 6 (September 28, 2018)
Weight class				Method	Round	Time	Notes
Middleweight	(United States) Shane Mosley Jr. (Gold)	def.	(United States) Devaun Lee (Blue)	TKO	5	2:59
Fight 7 – Episode 7 (October 5, 2018)
Weight class				Method	Round	Time	Notes
Middleweight	(Ukraine) Ievgen Khytrov (Gold)	def.	(United States) Morgan Fitch (Blue)	TKO	3	2:43
Fight 8 – Episode 7 (October 5, 2018)
Weight class				Method	Round	Time	Notes
Middleweight	(United States) Brandon Adams (Blue)	def.	(United States) Tyrone Brunson (Gold)	TKO	4	2:00
Quarterfinal 1 – Episode 8 (October 12, 2018)
Weight class				Method	Round	Time	Notes
Middleweight	(United States) Eric Walker	def	(United States) John Thompson	Decsision (unanimous): 50–44, 50–44, 50–44	5
Quarterfinal 2 – Episode 9 (October 19, 2018)
Weight class				Method	Round	Time	Notes
Middleweight	(United States) Brandon Adams	def	(Ukraine) Ievgen Khytrov	Decision (unanimous): 50–44, 49–45, 49–45	5
Quarterfinal 3 – Episode 10 (October 26, 2018)
Weight class				Method	Round	Time	Notes
Middleweight	(United States) Michael Moore	def	(United States) Gerald Sherrell	Decision (unanimous): 49-46, 49-46, 49-46	5
Quarterfinal 4 – Episode 10 (October 26, 2018)
Weight class				Method	Round	Time	Notes
Middleweight	(United States) Shane Mosley Jr.	def	(Mexico) Daniel Valdivia*	Decision (unanimous): 50-43, 49-44, 47-46	5
Semifinal 1 – Episode 11 (November 2, 2018)
Weight class				Method	Round	Time	Notes
Middleweight	(United States) Brandon Adams	def	(United States) Eric Walker	Decision (majority): 47-47, 49-45, 48-46	5
Semifinal 2 – Episode 11 (November 2, 2018)
Weight class				Method	Round	Time	Notes
Middleweight	(United States) Shane Mosley Jr.	def	(United States) Michael Moore	Decision (split): 49-46, 47-48, 49-46	5
Final — Episode 12 (November 9, 2018)
Weight class				Method	Round	Time	Notes
Middleweight	(United States) Brandon Adams	def	(United States) Shane Mosley Jr.	Decision (unanimous): 99-91, 100-90, 100-90	10
Bronze Match — Episode 12 (November 9, 2018)
Weight class				Method	Round	Time	Notes
Middleweight	(United States) Eric Walker	def	(United States) Michael Moore	Decision (unanimous): 80-73, 80-72, 80-72	8

on the undercard of the final, the following contenders were brought back to face each other:

- Tyrone Brunson def Devaun Lee via UD (59-55 x 3)
- Ievgen Khytrov def Malcolm McAllister via KO4
- Gerald Sherrell def Morgan Fitch via SD (58-56, 58-56, 56-58)
- Marcos Hernandez def Quatavious Cash via UD (58-56 x 3)
