= Willie Monroe Jr. =

American boxer (born 1986)

Personal information
- Nickname: El Mongoose
- Born: December 17, 1986 (age 39) Rochester, New York, U.S.
- Height: 5 ft 10 in (178 cm)
- Weight: Super Middleweight; Middleweight

Boxing career
- Reach: 74 in (188 cm)
- Stance: Southpaw

Boxing record
- Total fights: 27
- Wins: 24
- Win by KO: 6
- Losses: 3

Willie Monroe Jr. (born December 17, 1986) is an American professional boxer. He has challenged twice for a world title; first in 2015 for the WBA (Super), interim WBC, and IBO middleweight titles. In 2017, he challenged for the WBO middleweight title.

== Amateur career ==
Monroe's amateur record was 128–14, he won gold at the Empire Games and in the New York Golden Gloves.

== Professional career ==
Monroe made his debut on March 27, 2008 against Erix Quinteros. After winning his first 10 fights, his first loss came against Darnell Boone in 2011. After the loss he was released by his promoter. After 17 months without a fight, Monroe returned to the ring in August 2012. In 2014 he won the Boxcino Tournament which aired on ESPN 2. On January 16, 2015 he defeated Brian Vera in a 10-round unanimous decision.

=== Monroe Jr vs. Golovkin ===
Monroe fought against undefeated Gennady Golovkin on May 16, 2015. He lost the fight with a sixth round TKO.

=== Monroe Jr vs. Saunders ===
On September 16, 2017, Monroe Jr challenged Billy Joe Saunders for his WBO middleweight title but ultimately suffered the third defeat of his career, via a unanimous decision.

=== Monroe Jr vs. Maciel ===
On 24 August 2018, Monroe Jr fought and defeated Javier Francisco Maciel via unanimous decision, winning 100-90, 100-90 and 99-91 on the scorecards.

=== Monroe Jr vs. Centeno Jr ===
In his next bout, Monroe Jr faced the WBC #14 at middleweight Hugo Centeno Jr. In a largely slow and actionless fight, Monroe Jr managed to come out with a unanimous decision victory, 98-92, 97-93 and 96-94 on the scorecards.

== Professional boxing record ==
27 fights	24 wins	3 losses
By knockout	6	1
By decision	18	2

No.	Result	Record	Opponent	Type	Round, time	Date	Location	Notes
27	Win	24–3	(United States) Hugo Centeno Jr.	UD	10	2019-06-01	(United States) Soboba Casino, San Jacinto, California	
26	Win	23–3	(Argentina) Javier Francisco Maciel	UD	10	2018-08-24	(United States) Minneapolis Armory, Minneapolis	
25	Win	22–3	(Colombia) Carlos Galvan	UD	8	2018-03-03	(United States) Barclays Center, New York City, New York	
24	Loss	21–3	(United Kingdom) Billy Joe Saunders	UD	12	2017-09-16	(United Kingdom) Copper Box Arena, London, England	For WBO middleweight title
23	Win	21–2	(United States) Gabriel Rosado	UD	12	2016-09-17	(United States) AT&T Stadium, Arlington, Texas	Won vacant WBO Intercontinental middleweight title
22	Win	20–2	(United States) John Thompson	UD	12	2016-06-11	(United States) Turning Stone Resort & Casino, Verona, New York	
21	Loss	19–2	(Kazakhstan) Gennadiy Golovkin	TKO	6 (12), 0:45	2015-05-16	(United States) The Forum, Inglewood, California	For WBA (Super), IBO & interim WBC middleweight titles
20	Win	19–1	(United States) Brian Vera	UD	10	2015-01-16	(United States) Turning Stone Resort & Casino, Verona, New York	Retained WBA, NABA Middleweight title and WBO NABO middleweight title
19	Win	18–1	(United States) Brandon Adams	UD	10	2014-05-23	(United States) Turning Stone Resort & Casino, Verona, New York	Won vacant WBA, NABA, and vacant WBO NABO middleweight titles
18	Win	17–1	(Ukraine) Vitalii Kopylenko	UD	8	2014-04-18	(United States) Turning Stone Resort & Casino, Verona, New York	
17	Win	16–1	(Lithuania) Donatas Bondorovas	UD	6	2014-02-28	(United States) Horseshoe Casino, Hammond, Indiana	
16	Win	15–1	(Mexico) Miguel Alvarez	UD	6	2013-10-11	(United States) New Daisy Beale, Memphis, Tennessee	
15	Win	14–1	(United States) Toris Smith	RTD	3 (6), 3:00	2013-09-07	(United States) Civic Center, Biloxi, Mississippi	
14	Win	13–1	(United States) Michael Walker	TKO	1 (4), 1:22	2013-07-27	(United States) Bumpus Hardley Davidson, Memphis, Tennessee	
13	Win	12–1	(United States) Russell Jordan	UD	8	2013-03-21	(United States) Main Street Armory, Rochester, New York	
12	Win	11–1	(United States) Mark Anderson	UD	6	2012-08-08	(United States) Sahlen Stadium, Rochester, New York	
11	Loss	10–1	(United States) Darnell Boone	SD	8	2011-03-29	(United States) BB King Blues Club & Grill, New York City	
10	Win	10–0	(United States) Mickey Scarborough	TKO	5 (8), 1:53	2010-10-15	(United States) Main Street Armory, Rochester, New York	
9	Win	9–0	(United States) Loren Myers	RTD	4 (6), 3:00	2010-07-28	(United States) BB King Blues Club & Grill, New York City	
8	Win	8–0	(United States) Ibahiem King	UD	6	2010-04-10	(United States) BankAtlantic Center, Sunrise, Florida	
7	Win	7–0	(United States) Troy Artis	UD	6	2009-11-19	(United States) Main Street Armory, Rochester, New York	
6	Win	6–0	(United States) Tyson Schwieger	UD	4	2009-10-02	(United States) First Council Casino, Newkirk, Oklahoma	
5	Win	5–0	(United States) Torrence King	TKO	6 (6), 2:25	2009-05-07	(United States) Main Street Armory, Rochester, New York	
4	Win	4–0	(Canada) Chris Aucoin	UD	4	2008-11-19	(United States) OnCenter, Syracuse, New York	
3	Win	3–0	(United States) Wilson Montero	UD	4	2008-07-31	(United States) Frontier Field, Rochester, New York	
2	Win	2–0	(United States) Edward Smith	UD	4	2008-06-26	(United States) Main Street Armory, Rochester, New York	
1	Win	1–0	(United States) Erix Quinteros	TKO	3 (4), 2:25	2008-03-27	(United States) Main Street Armory, Rochester, New York	
