= Hugo Centeno Jr. =

American boxer

Personal information
- Nickname: The Boss
- Born: Hugo Centeno Jr. February 19, 1991 (age 35) Oxnard, California, U.S.
- Height: 6 ft 1 in (185 cm)
- Weight: Light middleweight Middleweight

Boxing career
- Reach: 75.5 in (192 cm)
- Stance: Orthodox

Boxing record
- Total fights: 34
- Wins: 28
- Win by KO: 15
- Losses: 4
- Draws: 1
- No contests: 1

Hugo Centeno Jr. (born February 19, 1991 in Oxnard, California) is an American professional boxer. He is managed by Al Haymon.

== Professional career ==
On September 17, 2010 Centeno beat the veteran Hector Rivera at the Nido Sport Center in Mexicali, Baja California, Mexico.

== Professional boxing record ==
| 32 fights | 27 wins | 3 losses |
|---|---|---|
| By knockout | 14 | 2 |
| By decision | 13 | 1 |
| Draws | 1 | |
| No contests | 1 | |

27 Wins (14 knockouts, 13 decisions), 3 Losses (2 knockouts, 1 decisions), 1 Draws, 1 No Contest
| Res. | Record | Opponent | Type | Rd., Time | Date | Location | Notes |
| Loss | 27-3 (1) | (United States) Willie Monroe Jr. | UD | 10 | 2019-06-01 | (United States) Soboba Casino, San Jacinto, California, U.S. | |
| Win | 27-2 (1) | (Mexico) Oscar Cortes | TD | 4 (10), 1:55 | 2019-02-16 | (United States) Microsoft Theater, Los Angeles, California, U.S. | |
| Loss | 26-2 (1) | (United States) Jermall Charlo | KO | 2 (12), 0:55 | 2018-04-21 | (United States) Barclays Center, New York City, New York, U.S. | For vacant WBC interim middleweight title |
| Win | 26-1 (1) | (United States) Immanuwel Aleem | KO | 3 (10), 2:27 | 2017-08-25 | (United States) Buffalo Run Casino, Miami, Florida | |
| Win | 25-1 (1) | (Colombia) Ronald Montes | RTD | 3 (8), 3:00 | 2016-12-10 | (United States) USC Galen Center, Los Angeles, California | |
| Loss | 24-1 (1) | (Poland) Maciej Sulęcki | TKO | 10 (10), 1:06 | 2016-06-18 | (United States) UIC Pavilion, Chicago | |
| Win | 24-0 (1) | (Mexico) Josue Ovando | UD | 10 | 2015-12-12 | (United States) AT&T Center, San Antonio | |
| Win | 23-0 (1) | (Poland) Lukas Maciec | UD | 8 | 2015-09-12 | (United States) Foxwoods Resort Casino, Mashantucket, Connecticut | |
| Win | 22-0 (1) | (Mexico) James de la Rosa | KO | 5 (10), 2:20 | 2014-12-06 | (United States) Barclays Center, Brooklyn, New York | |
| Win | 21-0 (1) | (United States) Gerardo Ibarra | UD | 10 | 2014-06-03 | (United States) Fantasy Springs Resort Casino, Indio, California | |
| Win | 20-0 (1) | (United States) Angel Osuna | KO | 10 (10), 0:52 | 2013-12-13 | (United States) Fantasy Springs Resort Casino, Indio, California | |
| NC | 19-0 (1) | (United States) Julian Williams | NC | 4 (10), 0:59 | 2013-09-12 | (United States) MGM Grand, Las Vegas | For vacant WBC International light middleweight title |
| Win | 19-0 | (Mexico) Isaac Mendez | KO | 1 (8), 0:46 | 2013-07-20 | (Mexico) Domo de la Colosio, Playa del Carmen, Quintana Roo | |
| Win | 18-0 | (United States) KeAndrae Leatherwood | UD | 10 | 2013-03-08 | (United States) Fantasy Springs Resort Casino, Indio, California | |
| Win | 17-0 | (United States) Allen Conyers | RTD | 6 (8), 3:00 | 2012-12-15 | (United States) Los Angeles Memorial Sports Arena, Los Angeles | |
| Win | 16-0 | (United States) Justin Williams | UD | 6 | 2012-10-06 | (United States) Sacramento Convention Center Complex, Sacramento, California | |
| Win | 15-0 | (Ghana) Ayi Bruce | UD | 8 | 2012-07-28 | (United States) HP Pavilion, San Jose, California | |
| Win | 14-0 | (Azerbaijan) Rahman Mustafa Yusubov | TKO | 4 (6), 2:39 | 2012-06-02 | (United States) Fantasy Springs Resort Casino, Indio, California | |
| Win | 13-0 | (Mexico) Gerardo Cesar Prieto | TKO | 4 (8), 1:54 | 2012-04-07 | (United States) Phoenix Club, Anaheim, California | |
| Win | 12-0 | (Nicaragua) Octavio Narvaez | UD | 6 | 2012-02-25 | (United States) Oceanview Pavilion, Port Hueneme, California | |
| Win | 11-0 | (United States) David Lopez | UD | 6 | 2011-12-01 | (United States) Club Nokia, Los Angeles | |
| Win | 10-0 | (United States) Hector Orozco | UD | 6 | 2011-11-04 | (United States) Fantasy Springs Resort Casino, Indio, California | |
| Win | 9-0 | (United States) Alfredo Rivera | UD | 4 | 17 Sep 2011 | (United States) Staples Center, Los Angeles | |
| Win | 8-0 | (United States) Kelly Wright | UD | 4 | 2011-06-03 | (United States) Warner Center Marriott, Woodland Hills, California | |
| Win | 7-0 | (United States) Jovanni Rubio | UD | 4 | 2011-04-21 | (United States) Orange County Fair, Costa Mesa, California | |
| Win | 6-0 | (United States) Jesus Vallejo | TKO | 1 (4), 1:29 | 2011-03-04 | (United States) Warner Center Marriott, Woodland Hills, California | |
| Win | 5-0 | (Mexico) Hector Rivera | KO | 1 (4), 1:04 | 2010-09-17 | (Mexico) Nido Sport Center, Mexicali, Baja California | |
| Win | 4-0 | (Mexico) David Orozco | KO | 1 (4), 1:41 | 2010-08-13 | (Mexico) Auditorio Ernesto Rufo, Rosarito, Baja California | |
| Win | 3-0 | (Mexico) Mario Evangelista | KO | 1 (4), 1:17 | 2010-04-01 | (United States) Marriott Hotel, Irvine, California | |
| Win | 2-0 | (United States) John Dunham | TKO | 1 (4), 2:05 | 2009-04-08 | (United States) Marriott Hotel, Irvine, California | |
| Win | 1-0 | (Mexico) Alan Lopez | TKO | 1 (4) | 2009-03-27 | (Mexico) Gimnasio Municipal, Mexicali, Baja California | |
