= Jorge Sebastian Heiland =

Argentine boxer

Personal information
- Nickname: El Gaucho de Pigüé
- Born: February 5, 1987 (age 39) Cipolletti, Rio Negro, Argentina
- Weight: Middleweight

Boxing career
- Stance: Southpaw

Boxing record
- Total fights: 36
- Wins: 29
- Win by KO: 16
- Losses: 5
- Draws: 2
- No contests: 0

Jorge Sebastian Heiland (born 5 February 1987) is an Argentine professional boxer and the current WBC International middleweight champion.

== Professional boxing ==
He made his debut in 2007, defeating Ceferino Juan Jose Coronel by UD decision. In 2009, Heiland won vacant WBC Latino middleweight title, defeating Gaston Alejandro Vega.

On November 29, 2013, he won the vacant WBC International middleweight title, defeating Billi Facundo Godoy.

He reached the number one spot in the WBC rankings, but was defeated by Jermall Charlo in a title eliminator on 29 July 2017.

== Professional record ==
36 fights	29 wins	5 losses
By knockout	15	1
By decision	13	4
By disqualification	1	0
Draws	2	

No.	Result	Record	Opponent	Type	Round, time	Date	Location	Notes
36	Loss	29–5–2	(United States) Jermall Charlo	TKO	4 (12), 2:13	Jul 29, 2017	(United States) Barclays Center, New York City, U.S.	
35	Win	29–4–2	(Argentina) Mateo Damian Veron	KO	8 (10)	Apr 21, 2017	Club Social y Deportivo El Porvenir, Quilmes, Buenos Aires, Argentina	
34	Win	28–4–2	(United States) Angel Hernandez	TKO	2 (8), 0:47	Sep 9, 2016	(United States) Santander Arena, Reading, Pennsylvania, U.S.	
33	Win	27–4–2	(Argentina) Martin Fidel Rios	UD	10	Apr 9, 2016	Club Rivadavia, Necochea, Buenos Aires, Argentina	
32	Win	26–4–2	(Argentina) Claudio Ariel Abalos	KO	6 (10)	Sep 19, 2015	Club Rivadavia, Buenos Aires, Argentina	Retained WBC International middleweight title
31	Win	25–4–2	(United Kingdom) Matthew Macklin	KO	10 (12) 0:42	Nov 15, 2014	(Republic of Ireland) 3Arena, Dublin, Ireland	Retained WBC International middleweight title
30	Win	24–4–2	(Argentina) Mateo Damian Veron	TKO	5 (8) 0:55	Sep 19, 2014	Anfiteatro Municipal, Córdoba, Argentina	
29	Win	23–4–2	(Argentina) Cesar Hernan Reynoso	TKO	5 (8), 1:23	Jun 6, 2014	Villa La Ñata Sporting Club, Buenos Aires, Argentina	
28	Win	22–4–2	(Argentina) Billi Facundo Godoy	KO	12 (12) 1:50	Nov 29, 2013	Estadio Ruca Che, Neuquén, Argentina	Won WBC International middleweight title
27	Loss	21–4–2	(Argentina) Mateo Damian Veron	MD	10	Jun 28, 2013	Auditorio Presidente Néstor Kirchner, Buenos Aires, Argentina	
26	Win	21–3–2	(Brazil) Douglas Damiao Ataide	DQ	6 (10), 2:54	Apr 6, 2013	Centro de Educación Física Nº 83, Buenos Aires, Argentina	Won vacant WBC Latino middleweight title
25	Win	20–3–2	(Argentina) Mateo Damian Veron	MD	8	Sep 22, 2012	Estadio Luna Park, Buenos Aires, Argentina	
24	Loss	19–3–2	(Argentina) Billi Facundo Godoy	UD	12	Jul 7, 2012	Estadio Ruca Che, Neuquén. Argentina	For WBC International middleweight title
23	Draw	19–2–2	(Argentina) Cristian Fabian Rios	SD	6	Mar 24, 2012	Salón de los Bomberos Voluntarios, Buenos Aires, Argentina	
22	Win	19–2–1	(Argentina) Esteban Waldemar Ponce	UD	6	Dec 9, 2011	Salón de los Bomberos Voluntarios, Buenos Aires, Argentina	
21	Draw	18–2–1	(Argentina) Mateo Damian Veron	SD	8	Sep 10, 2011	Polideportivo Municipal, La Pampa, Argentina	
20	Win	18–2	(Argentina) Sergio Jose Sanders	UD	10	May 21, 2011	Centro de Educación Física Nº 83, Buenos Aires, Argentina	
19	Win	17–2	(Argentina) Ruben Silva Diaz	KO	2 (10) 2:58	Mar 25, 2011	Salón de los Bomberos Voluntarios, Buenos Aires, Argentina	
18	Loss	16–2	(Colombia) Nilson Julio Tapia	UD	10	Oct 2, 2010	Arena Roberto Durán, Panama City, Panama	For vacant WBA Fedelatin middleweight title
17	Loss	16–1	(Germany) Sebastian Zbik	UD	12	Jul 31, 2010	Barclaycard Arena, Hamburg, Germany	For WBC interim middleweight title
16	Win	16–0	(Argentina) Alejandro Gustavo Falliga	UD	10	May 15, 2010	Estadio Luna Park, Buenos Aires, Argentina	Won WBC Latino middleweight title
15	Win	15–0	(Brazil) Joilson Morais Silva	KO	2 (10) 1:53	Apr 10, 2010	Ce.De.M. N° 2, Buenos Aires, Argentina	Retained WBC Latino interim middleweight title
14	Win	14–0	(Colombia) Orlando Torres	UD	10	Nov 14, 2009	Club del Progreso, Rio Negro, Argentina	Retained WBC Latino interim middleweight title
13	Win	13–0	(Argentina) Gaston Alejandro Vega	UD	10	Sep 19, 2009	Rio Negro, Argentina	Won WBC Latino interim middleweight title
12	Win	12–0	(Colombia) Orlando Torres	UD	8	Jun 26, 2009	Estadio Luna Park, Buenos Aires, Argentina	
11	Win	11–0	(Argentina) Americo Rodolfo Sagania	UD	8	Apr 30, 2009	Estadio Luna Park, Buenos Aires, Argentina	
10	Win	10–0	(Argentina) Elvio Matias Figueroa	KO	6 (6)	Mar 20, 2009	Ce.De.M. N° 2, Buenos Aires, Argentina	
9	Win	9–0	(Argentina) Alejandro Gabriel Boatto	TKO	2 (6)	Dec 20, 2008	Club Ciclista Juninense, Buenos Aires, Argentina	
8	Win	8–0	(Argentina) Jonathan Emanuel Arias	TKO	2 (6)	Aug 22, 2008	Estadio Socios Fundadores, Chubut, Argentina	
7	Win	7–0	(Argentina) Raul Alberto Gutierrez Sanchez	RTD	5 (6) 0:01	Jun 20, 2008	Parque Central, Neuquén, Argentina	
6	Win	6–0	(Argentina) Fabian Leonardo Velardes	TKO	5 (6)	Apr 12, 2008	Club Sarmiento, Buenos Aires, Argentina	
5	Win	5–0	(Argentina) Osvaldo Leonardo Acuna	RTD	4 (4) 0:56	Feb 29, 2008	Parque Prado Español, Buenos Aires, Argentina	
4	Win	4–0	(Argentina) Claudio Alberto Solis	TKO	1 (4)	Nov 2, 2007	Buenos Aires, Argentina	
3	Win	3–0	(Argentina) Angel German Ilundain	UD	4	Aug 31, 2007	Club Atlanta, Buenos Aires, Argentina	
2	Win	2–0	(Argentina) Marcos Alejandro Monzon	UD	4	Jun 2, 2007	Club Ciclista Juninense, Buenos Aires, Argentina	
1	Win	1–0	(Argentina) Ceferino Juan Jose Coronel	UD	4	Apr 7, 2007	Buenos Aires, Argentina	Heiland's professional debut
