= Lamar Russ =

American boxer

Personal information
- Nickname: The Boxing Que
- Born: January 15, 1987 (age 39) Tallahassee, Florida, U.S.
- Height: 6 ft 2 in (188 cm)
- Weight: Middleweight

Boxing career
- Reach: 75 in (191 cm)
- Stance: Orthodox

Boxing record
- Total fights: 22
- Wins: 18
- Win by KO: 9
- Losses: 3
- Draws: 0
- No contests: 1

Lamar Russ (born January 15, 1987) is an American professional boxer.

== Amateur career ==
Lamar is a six time North Carolina State champion and was ranked fifth in the nation during his amateur career.

== Professional career ==
On December 17, 2010, Russ upset former Haitian Olympian Elie Augustama. This bout was held at the UIC Pavilion in Chicago.

Russ suffered his first professional defeat in a bout against Matthew Macklin on December 7, 2013

Russ suffered his fourth loss in a bout against Aidan Werner on January 2, due to a doctor stoppage.

== Professional boxing record ==
22 fights	18 wins	3 losses
By knockout	9	1
By decision	9	2
No contests	1	

Result	Record	Opponent	Type	Round, Time	Date	Location	Notes
Win	18-3 (1)	Ricardo Vasquez Becerril	KO	7 (8) 2:59	26 Mar 2022	SouthPaw Arena, Rock Hill, South Carolina, U.S.	
Loss	17-3 (1)	Apollo Thompson	RTD	2 (5) 3:00	25 Apr 2018	LADC Studios, Los Angeles, California, U.S.	
Win	17-2 (1)	Juan De Angel	SD	8	29 Apr 2017	Center Stage@NoDa, Charlotte, North Carolina, U.S.	
Win	16-2 (1)	Antwun Echols	KO	1 (8) 0:18	30 Apr 2016	Crown Coliseum, Fayetteville, North Carolina, U.S.	
Win	15-2 (1)	Jonathan Reid	UD	6	6 Dec 2014	Coliseum Complex Events Center, Greensboro, North Carolina, U.S.	
Loss	14-2 (1)	Derrick Findley	UD	8	13 Aug 2014	BB King Blues Club & Grill, New York City, New York, U.S.	
NC	14-1 (1)	Tony Hirsch	NC	1 (8) 3:00	21 Mar 2014	Aviator Sports Complex, New York City, New York, U.S.	The bout was stopped when Hirsch received a cut over his right eye from an accidental head butt
Loss	14-1	Matthew Macklin	UD	10	7 Dec 2013	Boardwalk Hall, Atlantic City, New Jersey, U.S.	
Win	14-0	Latif Mundy	UD	8	16 Sep 2013	Resorts World Casino, New York City, New York, U.S.	
Win	13-0	Russell Jordan	UD	8	15 May 2013	BB King Blues Club & Grill, New York City, New York, U.S.	
Win	12-0	José Medina	UD	8	23 Jan 2013	BB King Blues Club & Grill, New York City, New York, U.S.	
Win	11-0	Jose Cepeda	TKO	1 (8) 1:45	12 Dec 2012	Ameristar Casino, Saint Charles, Missouri, U.S.	
Win	10-0	Jose Alonzo	KO	4 (6) 1:08	14 Apr 2012	Cicero Stadium, Cicero, Illinois, U.S.	
Win	9-0	Roberto Yong	UD	6	3 Feb 2012	Texas Station Casino, North Las Vegas, Nevada, U.S.	
Win	8-0	Marcus Upshaw	UD	6	9 Jul 2011	Seminole Hard Rock Hotel and Casino, Hollywood, Florida, U.S.	
Win	7-0	Elie Augustama	MD	6	17 Dec 2010	UIC Pavilion, Chicago, Illinois, U.S.	
Win	6-0	Brad Austin	UD	6	3 Dec 2010	World Congress Center, Atlanta, Georgia, U.S.	
Win	5-0	Robert Kamya	TKO	3 (4) 2:35	13 Nov 2010	Greensboro Coliseum, Greensboro, North Carolina, U.S.	
Win	4-0	Nain Yates	TKO	3 (4) 2:04	23 Jul 2010	Civic Center, Corbin, Kentucky, U.S.	
Win	3-0	Brandon Wyatt	TKO	3 (4) 1:52	19 Jun 2010	Emerald Queen Casino, Tacoma, Washington, U.S.	
Win	2-0	Shawn Actie	TKO	3 (4) 0:58	16 Jan 2010	City Auditorium, Macon, Georgia, U.S.	
Win	1-0	Frank Armstrong	KO	3 (4) 0:39	10 Oct 2009	Coliseum Complex Events Center, Greensboro, North Carolina, U.S.	

== Personal life ==
Russ graduated from Fayetteville State University with a degree in Business Administration in 2011. His nickname, "The Boxing Que," references his membership in the Omega Psi Phi fraternity as its members are known as "Ques."
