= John Thompson (boxer) =

American boxer

Personal information
- Nickname: Apollo Kidd
- Nationality: American
- Born: John Thompson; March 5, 1989 (age 37) Newark, New Jersey, U.S.
- Height: 6 ft 0 in (1.8 m)
- Weight: Light middleweight Middleweight

Boxing career
- Stance: Orthodox

Boxing record
- Total fights: 24
- Wins: 19
- Win by KO: 7
- Losses: 5
- Draws: 0

John Thompson (born March 5, 1989) is an American junior middleweight professional boxer.

== 2015 Boxcino tournament ==
Thompson won the 2015 Boxcino tournament - a tournament featured exclusively on ESPN Friday Night Fights. At the finals of this tournament, he also won the interim North American Boxing Association and WBO Inter-Continental junior middleweight titles.

== WBO world title fight ==
The Boxcino win increased Thompson's ranking in the WBO. When the WBO title was stripped from Demetrius Andrade, Liam Smith was to fight Michel Soro for the vacant title. Soro pulled out of the fight for the vacant title so Thompson was awarded the title shot by being the next highest available fighter. The fight took place on October 10, 2015, on the undercard of the Andy Lee-Billy Joe Saunders title fight, with Thompson losing by knockout.
