= Boxing in Liverpool =

Boxing in Liverpool, the United Kingdom, is centered on approximately 22 amateur boxing clubs. The city has produced several national, European, and world champion boxers.

Boxers from Liverpool were a significant percentage of the 2012 Olympics British Boxing Team. Boxing events were most commonly held at Liverpool Stadium; since then boxing events have been hosted at the Echo Arena and Liverpool Olympia within the city.

== History ==
Boxing in Liverpool developed rapidly in the late 19th and early 20th centuries, alongside the growth of the city as a major port. The sport became deeply embedded in working-class communities, particularly in districts such as Toxteth, Kirkdale, and Everton.

The opening of Liverpool Stadium in 1932 marked the United Kingdom’s first purpose-built boxing arena and venue for major fights.

Throughout the 20th century, Liverpool was considered a leading boxing city, producing British and international champions and maintaining a successful amateur boxing infrastructure.

== Notable amateur boxers from Liverpool ==
=== David Burke ===
David Burke won a bronze medal in men's featherweight at the 1996 European Amateur Boxing Championships in Vejle in the 57 kg division. He represented Salisbury Amateur Boxing Club.

=== Natasha Jonas ===
Natasha Jonas, from Toxteth, was the first British female boxer to ever qualify for and compete at an Olympic games, as GB Boxing's women's 60 kg representative at the 2012 London Olympics. She also won a bronze medal at the 2012 AIBA Women's World Boxing Championships in Qinhuangdao. She represents Rotunda Amateur Boxing Club.

=== Daniel Ezra Deane ===
Daniel Ezra Deane, from Dingle, Liverpool, 6"1 tall & then aged 36, won the gold medal as heavyweight at the 1996 European Amateur Boxing Championships in Vejle. He also boasted a professional record of 15-15-0 before his career was ended after an injury whilst on active deployment. He was from the backstreets of Moses Street.

=== Jay Deane Brown ===
Jay "Back alley" Brown, Cousin of Daniel Lowday (Ezra Deane) was from the back streets of Dingle (Graffton Street). He boasted of an amateur record of 20-0 with 19 KO's and 1 TKO, he boxed out of the United services club (L8 Byles street) but had to give up his career due to unforeseen circumstances. He currently works as a doorman in Liverpool's club scene.

=== Neil Perkins ===
Neil Perkins, from Kirkdale, won a bronze medal at the 2005 World Amateur Boxing Championships in the 69 kg division. He represented Kirkdale Amateur Boxing Club.

=== David Price ===
David Price, from West Derby, won a bronze medal at the 2008 Beijing Olympics in the 91+ kg division where he also captained the GB Boxing team. He represented Long Lane and Salisbury amateur boxing clubs.

=== Stephen Smith ===
Stephen Smith, from Kirkdale, won a bronze medal at the 2006 European Amateur Boxing Championships in Plovdiv in the 52 kg division. He represented Rotunda Amateur Boxing Club.

=== Tom Stalker ===
Tom Stalker, from Huyton, captained GB Boxing's Olympic team at the 2012 London Olympics. He won a bronze medal at the 2011 World Amateur Boxing Championships in Baku at 64 kg, and he twice won a silver medal (60 kg & 64 kg) at the 2010 European Amateur Boxing Championships and the 2011 European Amateur Boxing Championships in Moscow and Ankara respectively. He represented St. Aloysius and Salisbury amateur boxing clubs.

=== Tony Willis ===
Tony Willis won a bronze medal at the 1980 Moscow Olympics in the 63.5 kg division.

== Notable professional boxers from Liverpool ==
=== George Turpin ===
George Turpin won a bronze medal at the 1972 Munich Olympics in the 56 kg division.

=== Tony Bellew ===
Tony Bellew (30-3-1), from Wavertree, is a former WBC cruiserweight champion and former BBBofC British light heavyweight champion, a former commonwealth light heavyweight champion and a heavyweight contender. He is a former two-time light heavyweight world title challenger. He has fought Nathan Cleverly, Edison Miranda, and Isaac Chilemba, Adonis Stevenson, Ilunga Makabu, David Haye and Oleksandr Usyk.

=== Johnny Cooke ===
Johnny Cooke (52-34-7), from Bootle, was a BBBofC British and Commonwealth welterweight champion.

=== John Conteh ===
John Conteh (34-4-1), from Kirkby, a former WBC light heavyweight world champion, as well as the former BBBofC British and Commonwealth light heavyweight champion. He is considered Liverpool's greatest boxer.

=== Tony Dodson ===
Tony Dodson (29-8-1), from Garston, is a former BBBofC British super middleweight champion. He fought Carl Froch, Paul Smith, and Tony Quigley.

=== Rocky Fielding ===
Michael 'Rocky from Stocky' Fielding (30-2-0), from Stockbridge Village, was a WBA Inter-Continental super middleweight champion, and WBA regular world champion. He fought Mohammed Akrong, Tobias Webb and Canelo Alvarez.

=== Paul Hodkinson ===
Paul Hodkinson (22-3-1), from Kirkby, is a former BBBofC British featherweight champion and WBC featherweight world champion, a title which he defended successfully on four occasions. Hodkinson also was a challenger for the WBO featherweight title. He fought Marcos Villasana, Steve Cruz, and Gregorio Vargas.

=== Andy Holligan ===
Andy Holligan (27-3-0) is the former BBBofC British and Commonwealth light welterweight champion and former WBC light welterweight world title challenger. His most notable opponents were Julio César Chávez and Shea Neary.

=== Derry Mathews ===
Derry Mathews (34-8-2), from Anfield, was a Commonwealth lightweight champion and former BBBofC British lightweight champion. He fought Gavin Rees, Anthony Crolla, and Gary Buckland.

=== Shea Neary ===
Shea Neary (23-2-0) is a former WBU light welterweight champion. He fought Micky Ward, Andy Holligan, and Eamonn Magee.

=== Liam Smith ===
Liam Smith (15-0-1) from Kirkdale is the reigning WBO light middleweight world champion. He is one of the four famous Smith brothers. His most notable opponents to date are Eric Ochieng and Max Maxwell.

=== Paul Smith Jr ===
Paul Smith (33-3-0) from Kirkdale was BBBofC British super middleweight champion, a title he held on at least two separate occasions. He is one of the four famous Smith brothers. He fought James DeGale, George Groves, and Tony Dodson.

=== Stephen Smith ===
Stephen Smith (18-1-0), from Kirkdale, was BBBofC British super featherweight champion and the former BBBofC British and Commonwealth featherweight champion. He is one of the four famous Smith brothers. He fought Gary Buckland, Lee Selby, and John Simpson.

=== Callum Smith ===
Callum Smith (28-1-0), from Kirkdale is the most decorated of the four Smith brothers. He was BBBofC British Super Middleweight champion and the former unified super middleweight champion of the world. He beat George Groves to win the Muhammad Ali trophy in the World Boxing Super Series final and his only loss was to Canelo Álvarez where he suffered a bicep injury. Callum now competes at light heavyweight.

=== David Price ===
David Price (15-2-0), from West Derby, was a BBBofC British and Commonwealth heavyweight champion. He fought Tony Thomson and Audley Harrison.

=== Joey Singleton ===
Joey Singleton (27-11-2) from Kirkby was a BBBofC British light-welterweight champion 1974-1976. He won the title from Pat McCormick (15 rounds - points) at the Liverpool Stadium, and lost it two years later on a cut eye stoppage in round 6 to Dave Boy Green at the Royal Albert Hall on June 1, 1976. Singleton defended his title 3 times, winning the Lonsdale Belt outright in a record eight professional fights. He fought and lost to Jorgen Hansen for the European Welterweight Title on April 17, 1980.

=== Alan Rudkin ===
Alan Rudkin (42-8-0) from Dingle was a former BBBofC British and Commonwealth bantamweight champion. He also challenged for the WBC and WBA bantamweight world titles on several occasions. He fought Fighting Harada, Lionel Rose, and Rubén Olivares.

=== Kevin Satchell ===
Kevin Satchell (11-0-0) from Kirkdale was a BBBofC British and Commonwealth flyweight champion. He fought Iain Butcher, Luke Wilton, and Paul Edwards.

=== Nel Tarleton ===
Nel Tarleton (119-21-8) was a former BBBofC British and Commonwealth featherweight champion, a title he has held on several separate occasions.

=== Tony Willis ===
Tony Willis (25-4-0) is a former BBBofC British lightweight champion, a title he defended three times. He fought Steve Boyle, George Feeney, and Alex Dickson.
