= Lee Selby =

Welsh boxer (born 1987)

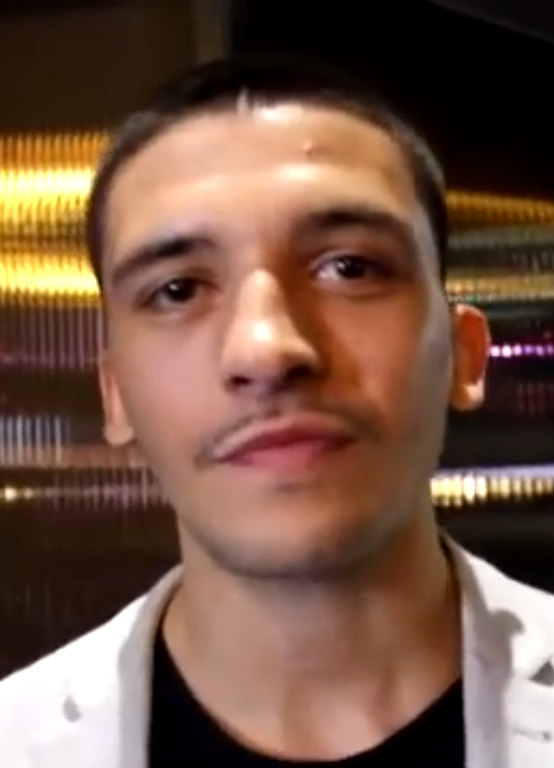
- Selby in 2015

Personal information
- Nicknames: Lightning; The Welsh Mayweather
- Nationality: British
- Born: 14 February 1987 (age 39) Barry, Wales
- Height: 5 ft 8 in (173 cm)
- Weight: Featherweight; Lightweight

Boxing career
- Reach: 69 1/2 in (177 cm)
- Stance: Orthodox

Boxing record
- Total fights: 32
- Wins: 28
- Win by KO: 9
- Losses: 4
Medal record
Men's amateur boxing
Representing Wales
Welsh National Championships
Gold medal – first place	2006 Newport	Featherweight
Gold medal – first place	2007 Ystradgynlais	Lightweight
Gold medal – first place	2008 Port Talbot	Heavyweight

Lee Selby (born 14 February 1987) is a Welsh former professional boxer who competed from 2008 to 2022. He held the IBF featherweight title from 2015 to 2018. At regional level, he held the British, Commonwealth, and European featherweight titles between 2011 and 2014.

== Professional career ==
=== Early career ===
Selby began his professional career on 12 July 2008 with a win over Sid Razak (3-8) at the Newport Leisure Centre in Wales. He compiled a record of 4-0 before losing for the first time in his professional career to Samir Mouneimne (1-0-1) by points decision in a four-round contest at the Fenton Manor Sports Complex in Stoke on 29 May 2009. Selby won his next three fights before beating Dai Davies (6-13-1) for the Welsh Area title on 30 October 2010 claiming the belt with a second-round knockout. On 30 July 2011, he met Scotsman James Ancliff (11-14-2) for the vacant Celtic featherweight title and claimed the belt with a sixth-round stoppage.

=== British and Commonwealth champion ===
On 17 September 2011, Selby claimed the British and Commonwealth titles with a win over then champion Stephen Smith via an eighth-round stoppage at the Olympia in Liverpool. Despite being the underdog going into the fight Selby took control of the centre of the ring and caught Smith with a left hand in the 8th round, a punch from which Smith was unable to recover. Selby said after the fight that the win "feels like I've won a world title" adding "It's something that I have been dreaming about since I was a kid. It's a big achievement and not a lot of people have done it".

On 20 April 2013 Selby dismantled the former unbeaten Australian champion Corey McConnell. McConell's corner threw in the towel in the fifth round.

=== WBC International Championship ===
==== Selby vs. Simion ====
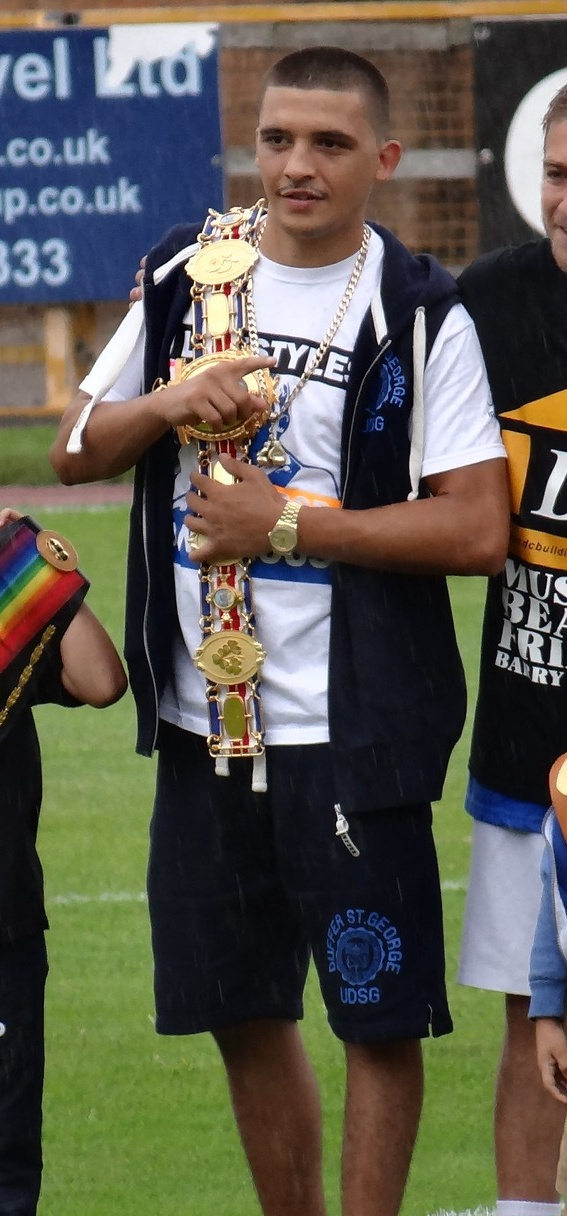
Selby attending a football match in 2013

On 13 July 2013, Lee Selby took another step towards a world title shot when he faced in Hull the unbeaten Romanian boxer and ranked at fourth by the WBC, Viorel Simion, and won the WBC International featherweight title with a unanimous decision victory. According to some prominent boxing writers, the British rising star passed the toughest test of his career in a very close fight.

=== IBF featherweight champion ===
==== Selby vs. Gradovich ====
In May 2015, Lee Selby won the IBF featherweight title from Evgeny Gradovich. The fight ended in a unanimous TD after Gradovich was cut from an accidental head clash, and was unable to continue.

==== Selby vs. Montiel ====
Selby retained his IBF featherweight title in October 2015 with a win over Mexican Fernando Montiel in Arizona. He dedicated the win to his childhood friend Darren Bray, who had recently died.

==== Selby vs. Barros ====
In July 2017, Lee made his next defence of his IBF featherweight crown. Just weeks before the fight, Selby received shocking news of his mother's sudden death in Wales, and his family urged him to pull out of the fight. Selby decided to continue training days later, and dedicate the fight to his mother.

==== Selby vs Warrington ====
On 19 May 2018, Selby defended his IBF featherweight title for the fifth time, against unbeaten Josh Warrington. Warrington was the aggressor early in the fight, and managed to rock Selby with a left hook in the second round and a jab to the temple. Selby suffered a bad cut over his left eye in the sixth round, but was allowed to continue the fight. Warrington managed to be busier than Selby and landed cleaner shots through most of the fight. Selby lost the belt to Warrington via split decision, 113–115, 116-112 and 115-113 for Warrington.

=== Post-title career ===
==== Selby vs Douglas ====
After losing his IBF belt, Selby bounced back with a victory over Omar Douglas. In a bloody fight, Selby managed to outbox Doulgas, to get the unanimous decision victory.

==== Selby vs Burns ====
In his next fight, Selby faced former world champion Ricky Burns. In a very close and foul-filled fight, Selby managed to win on two of the scorecards, 116-112 and 116–113, while the third judge had it a draw, 115-115.

==== Selby vs. Kambosos Jr. ====
Selby was scheduled to face George Kambosos Jr. in Cardiff on 9 May 2020. but was postponed due to the COVID-19 pandemic. The fight eventually went ahead on 31 October at The SSE Arena in London, where Selby went the distance but lost by split decision.

Selby announced his retirement from boxing on 5 April 2022.

== Bare-knuckle boxing ==
In February 2026, Selby signed a multi-fight deal with BKB Bare Knuckle Boxing.

== Professional boxing record ==
32 fights	28 wins	4 losses
By knockout	9	1
By decision	19	3

No.	Result	Record	Opponent	Type	Round, time	Date	Location	Notes
32	Loss	28–4	Gustavo Daniel Lemos	TKO	5 (12), 2:04	26 Mar 2022	Estadio Luna Park, Buenos Aires, Argentina	
31	Loss	28–3	George Kambosos Jr.	SD	12	31 Oct 2020	The SSE Arena, London, England	
30	Win	28–2	Ricky Burns	MD	12	26 Oct 2019	The O2 Arena, London, England	
29	Win	27–2	Omar Douglas	UD	12	23 Feb 2019	The O2 Arena, London, England	
28	Loss	26–2	Josh Warrington	SD	12	19 May 2018	Elland Road, Leeds, England	Lost IBF featherweight title
27	Win	26–1	Eduardo Ramirez	UD	12	9 Dec 2017	Copper Box Arena, London, England	Retained IBF featherweight title
26	Win	25–1	Jonathan Victor Barros	UD	12	15 Jul 2017	The SSE Arena, London, England	Retained IBF featherweight title
25	Win	24–1	Andoni Gago	TKO	9 (10), 0:41	4 Mar 2017	The O2 Arena, London, England	
24	Win	23–1	Eric Hunter	UD	12	9 Apr 2016	The O2 Arena, London, England	Retained IBF featherweight title
23	Win	22–1	Fernando Montiel	UD	12	14 Oct 2015	Gila River Arena, Glendale, Arizona, US	Retained IBF featherweight title
22	Win	21–1	Evgeny Gradovich	TD	8 (12), 1:00	30 May 2015	The O2 Arena, London, England	Won IBF featherweight title; Unanimous TD: Gradovich cut from an accidental head clash
21	Win	20–1	Joel Brunker	TKO	9 (12), 2:49	11 Oct 2014	The O2 Arena, London, England	
20	Win	19–1	Romulo Koasicha	UD	12	17 May 2014	Motorpoint Arena, Cardiff, Wales	Retained WBC International featherweight title
19	Win	18–1	Rendall Munroe	TKO	6 (12), 1:31	1 Feb 2014	Motorpoint Arena, Cardiff, Wales	Retained British featherweight title; Won vacant European featherweight title
18	Win	17–1	Ryan Walsh	UD	12	5 Oct 2013	The O2 Arena, London, England	Retained British and Commonwealth featherweight titles
17	Win	16–1	Viorel Simion	UD	12	13 Jul 2013	Craven Park, Hull, England	Won WBC International featherweight title
16	Win	15–1	Corey McConnell	TKO	5 (12), 1:16	20 Apr 2013	Winter Gardens, Blackpool, England	Retained Commonwealth featherweight title
15	Win	14–1	Martin Lindsay	UD	12	9 Feb 2013	Odyssey Arena, Belfast, Northern Ireland	Retained British and Commonwealth featherweight titles
14	Win	13–1	Patrick Okine	TKO	5 (12), 1:54	25 May 2012	Leisure Centre, Newport, Wales	Retained Commonwealth featherweight title
13	Win	12–1	John Simpson	TKO	5 (12), 2:02	14 Dec 2011	York Hall, London, England	Retained British and Commonwealth featherweight titles
12	Win	11–1	Stephen Smith	KO	8 (12), 2:04	17 Sep 2011	Liverpool Olympia, Liverpool, England	Won British and Commonwealth featherweight titles
11	Win	10–1	James Ancliff	TKO	6 (10), 2:12	30 Jul 2011	Pillgwenlly Millennium Centre, Newport, Wales	Won vacant British Celtic featherweight title
10	Win	9–1	Youssef Al Hamidi	PTS	6	27 Apr 2011	Liverpool Olympia, Liverpool, England	
9	Win	8–1	Dai Davies	KO	2 (10), 1:53	30 Oct 2010	Leisure Centre, Newport, Wales	Won vacant Welsh Area featherweight title
8	Win	7–1	Ben Jones	PTS	6	25 Jul 2010	Brentwood Centre, Brentwood, England	
7	Win	6–1	Jimmy Briggs	PTS	4	20 Nov 2009	Leisure Centre, Newport, Wales	
6	Win	5–1	Ian Bailey	PTS	6	10 Aug 2009	Jumeirah Carlton Tower, London, England	
5	Loss	4–1	Samir Mouneimne	PTS	4	29 May 2009	Fenton Manor Sports Complex, Stoke-on-Trent, England	
4	Win	4–0	Johnny Greaves	PTS	6	13 Mar 2009	Leisure Centre, Newport, Wales	
3	Win	3–0	Craig Johnson	PTS	4	27 Feb 2009	Metrodome, Barnsley, England	
2	Win	2–0	Peter Buckley	PTS	6	24 Oct 2008	Leisure Centre, Newport, Wales	
1	Win	1–0	Sid Razak	PTS	6	12 Jul 2008	Leisure Centre, Newport, Wales	

== Personal life ==
Selby is the brother of GB Boxing's 2012 Olympic flyweight representative Andrew Selby.

== See also ==
- List of Welsh boxing world champions

Sporting positions
Regional boxing titles
Vacant Title last held by Robbie Turley	British Welsh Area featherweight champion 30 October 2010 – July 2011; Vacated	Vacant Title next held by Dai Davies
New title	British Celtic featherweight champion 30 July 2011 – 17 September 2011; Won British title	Vacant Title next held by Kris Hughes
Preceded by Stephen Smith	British featherweight champion 17 September 2011 – May 2014; Vacated	Vacant Title next held by Josh Warrington
Preceded by Stephen Smith	Commonwealth featherweight champion 17 September 2011 – November 2013; Vacated	Vacant Title next held by Josh Warrington
Vacant Title last held by Alex Miskirtchian	European featherweight champion 1 February 2014 – May 2014; Vacated	Vacant Title next held by Josh Warrington
Preceded by Viorel Simion	WBC International featherweight champion 17 September 2011 – October 2014; Vacated	Vacant Title next held by Josh Warrington
World boxing titles
Preceded by Evgeny Gradovich	IBF featherweight champion 30 May 2015 – 19 May 2018	Succeeded by Josh Warrington
