= Gary Sykes =

British boxer (born 1984)

Personal information
- Nicknames: Five Star; Sykesy
- Born: 13 February 1984 (age 42) Dewsbury, England
- Height: 5 ft 8 in (173 cm)
- Weight: Super-featherweight; Lightweight

Boxing career
- Stance: Orthodox

Boxing record
- Total fights: 33
- Wins: 28
- Win by KO: 6
- Losses: 5

Gary Sykes (born 13 February 1984) is a British former professional boxer who competed from 2006 to 2016. He held the British super-featherweight title twice between 2010 and 2014, and challenged for the Commonwealth super-featherweight and lightweight titles in 2014 and 2016, respectively.

== Amateur career ==
Sykes boxing for Cleckheaton ABC enjoyed a 62 fight career as an amateur, a record which included at one stage a 32 fight winning streak as well as a victory over the current European champion at lightweight, John Murray. During his time as an amateur Sykes also won titles in the junior ABA's as well as the full ABA title in 2005 beating Mike Robinson in the 60 kg category in the event held at the Excel Arena in London. Despite establishing himself as one of England's top amateurs, Sykes missed out on a chance to go to the 2006 Commonwealth Games in Melbourne after Stephen Smith, another star amateur decided to move up and compete in the same weight division as Sykes. Speaking of the uncertainty at the time Sykes trainer Keith Tate said "everything is uncertain...because Smith's moved up to featherweight, and I know he's highly rated by Terry Edwards...I think Gary's earned his selection already but I have a feeling that this is going to come down to the next ABA Championships later this year....It seems like they're moving the goalposts and I'll feel sorry for Gary if he doesn't get the opportunity. He's had a great year." At the 2006 ABA championships, actually held on 2 December 2005 so as to allow preparation for the Commonwealth Games. Smith beat Akaash Bhatia in the final of the 57 kg.

== Professional career ==
Sykes made his professional boxing debut on 23 February 2006 at the Town Hall in Leeds fighting journeyman Dave Hinds and running out a winner over six rounds. Sykes followed up the victory with on further win in 2006, defeating Dai Davies once again at the Town Hall with a third-round knockout. In 2007 Sykes defeated Kristian Laight, Eduards Krauklis, Deniss Sirjatovs, Dwayne Hill and Carl Allen fighting in venues across the north of England including Barnsley, Wigan, Doncaster and Altrincham. In 2008 Sykes continued his winning streak with wins over Peter Allen, Harry Ramogoadi and Jason Nesbitt before starting 2009 on a high with a win over journeyman Johnny Greaves.

=== British Champion ===
On 29 May 2009 Sykes faced his biggest challenge so far against Anthony Crolla in an eliminator for British super featherweight Title, winning over the 10 round distance. Two more victories followed against Ibrar Riyaz and Dean Mills before getting the chance to fight for the title on 5 March 2010. The fight, against Andy Morris a former British featherweight champion, resulted in a close points win over 12 rounds at the Huddersfield Leisure Centre. Morris, who also won a Commonwealth games bronze medal as an amateur, had stepped in at last notice following the withdrawal of original opponent Ricky Burns. On 28 May 2010 Sykes made a successful first defence of his belt beating Kevin O'Hara again over 12 rounds at the Huddersfield Leisure Centre.

=== Prizefighter tournament ===
On 20 November 2010 Sykes chose to enter the knock out style Prizefighter series promoted by Barry Hearn and televised live by Sky Sports. The competition, which would provide the winner a prize of £32,000, pitched Sykes against former British and European title challenger Scott Lawton in the quarter finals in a bout which he comfortably won. In the semi-final Sykes, who had wanted to enter the tournament in order to raise his profile, faced Welshman Gary Buckland and suffered a surprise knockout defeat after just 45 seconds of the first round, the first defeat of his career. Luckily for Sykes, because of the format of the competition, his British title was not on the line. Buckland, himself a former European title challenger, went on to win the tournament beating Derry Mathews in the final.

=== Title defences ===
On 5 March 2011 Sykes returned to the ring for the second defence of his British title against former champion Carl Johanneson of Leeds, the mandatory challenger for the title. The fight, at the Huddersfield Sports Centre, resulted in a close points victory for Sykes after suffering a knockdown in the ninth round, eventually running out a 116–112, 115–112 and 115–113 winner. After the fight Sykes paid tribute to former champion Johanneson saying "To beat him means the world to me...when I first sparred with him I never thought I could last 12 rounds let alone beat him." For his third defence Sykes faced Gary Buckland with the two meeting on 24 September 2011. In a close back and forth contest Sykes lost the title to Buckland with the Welshman being awarded the decision over 12 rounds resulting in a second career defeat for Sykes.

=== Retirement ===
On 18 September 2016, Sykes announced his retirement from boxing on his Facebook page. He cited a lack of hunger and desire at his older age, and a lack of motivation to continue to fight.

== Professional boxing record ==
33 fights	28 wins	5 losses
By knockout	6	2
By decision	22	3

No.	Result	Record	Opponent	Type	Round, time	Date	Location	Notes
33	Loss	28–5	Luke Campbell	TKO	2 (12), 2:58	26 Mar 2016	Sheffield Arena, Sheffield, England	For vacant Commonwealth lightweight title
32	Win	28–4	Ibrar Riyaz	PTS	6	25 Jul 2015	Olympia, Liverpool, England	
31	Loss	27–4	Liam Walsh	UD	12	29 Nov 2014	ExCeL Arena, London, England	Lost British super-featherweight title; For Commonwealth super-featherweight title
30	Win	27–3	Jon Kays	TKO	10 (12), 1:33	24 May 2014	Dewsbury Leisure Centre, Dewsbury, England	Won vacant British super-featherweight title
29	Win	26–3	Femi Fehintola	PTS	8	21 Dec 2013	First Direct Arena, Leeds, England	
28	Win	25–3	Mark McKray	PTS	6	27 Sep 2013	Elland Road, Leeds, England	
27	Win	24–3	Jon Kays	UD	10	27 Apr 2013	Sheffield Arena, Sheffield, England	Retained English super-featherweight title
26	Win	23–3	Kevin Hooper	UD	10	15 Mar 2013	Beachcomber Club, Cleethorpes, England	Won vacant English super-featherweight title
25	Loss	22–3	Terry Flanagan	SD	3	6 Oct 2012	Olympia, Liverpool, England	Prizefighter: The Lightweights II – Final
24	Win	22–2	Anthony Crolla	SD	3	6 Oct 2012	Olympia, Liverpool, England	Prizefighter: The Lightweights II – Semi-final
23	Win	21–2	Tommy Coyle	UD	3	6 Oct 2012	Olympia, Liverpool, England	Prizefighter: The Lightweights II – Quarter-final
22	Win	20–2	Dean Mills	PTS	6	23 Mar 2012	Hull City Hall, Hull, England	
21	Loss	19–2	Gary Buckland	UD	12	24 Sep 2011	Ponds Forge Arena, Sheffield, England	Lost British super-featherweight title
20	Win	19–1	Valentin Stoychev	KO	3 (6)	23 Jul 2011	Huddersfield Sports Centre, Huddersfield, England	
19	Win	18–1	Carl Johanneson	UD	12	5 Mar 2011	Huddersfield Sports Centre, Huddersfield, England	Retained British super-featherweight title
18	Loss	17–1	Gary Buckland	TKO	1 (3)	20 Nov 2010	York Hall, London, England	Prizefighter: The Super-featherweights – Semi-final
17	Win	17–0	Scott Lawton	UD	3	20 Nov 2010	York Hall, London, England	Prizefighter: The Super-featherweights – Quarter-final
16	Win	16–0	Kevin O'Hara	UD	12	28 May 2010	Huddersfield Sports Centre, Huddersfield, England	Retained British super-featherweight title
15	Win	15–0	Andy Morris Jr.	UD	12	5 Mar 2010	Huddersfield Sports Centre, Huddersfield, England	Won vacant British super-featherweight title
14	Win	14–0	Dean Mills	PTS	6	5 Feb 2010	Harvey Hadden Leisure Centre, Nottingham, England	
13	Win	13–0	Ibrar Riyaz	PTS	8	16 Oct 2009	Seaburn Centre, Sunderland, England	
12	Win	12–0	Anthony Crolla	PTS	10	29 May 2009	Fenton Manor Sports Complex, Stoke-on-Trent, England	
11	Win	11–0	Johnny Greaves	PTS	4	29 Mar 2009	De Vere Whites Hotel, Bolton, England	
10	Win	10–0	Jason Nesbitt	TKO	4 (6)	21 Dec 2008	De Vere Whites Hotel, Bolton, England	
9	Win	9–0	Harry Ramogoadi	PTS	6	18 Jul 2008	Goresbrook Leisure Centre, Dagenham, England	
8	Win	8–0	Peter Allen	PTS	6	28 Mar 2008	Barnsley Metrodome, Barnsley, England	
7	Win	7–0	Carl Allen	PTS	6	8 Dec 2007	Robin Park Centre, Wigan, England	
6	Win	6–0	Dwayne Hill	TKO	4 (6)	19 Oct 2007	Doncaster Dome, Doncaster, England	
5	Win	5–0	Deniss Sirjatovs	TKO	2 (4)	13 Jul 2007	Barnsley Metrodome, Barnsley, England	
4	Win	4–0	Eduards Krauklis	PTS	4	24 Jun 2007	Robin Park Centre, Wigan, England	
3	Win	3–0	Kristian Laight	PTS	4	13 Apr 2007	Altrincham Leisure Centre, Altrincham, England	
2	Win	2–0	Dai Davis	KO	3 (6)	13 Apr 2006	Leeds Town Hall, Leeds, England	
1	Win	1–0	David Hinds	PTS	6	23 Feb 2006	Leeds Town Hall, Leeds, England	
