= Stephen Foster (boxer) =

English super featherweight boxer (born 1980)

Personal information
- Nationality: British
- Born: Stephen Foster; 16 September 1980 (age 45) Salford, England
- Weight: Super featherweight

Boxing career
- Stance: Orthodox

Boxing record
- Total fights: 40
- Wins: 33
- Win by KO: 19
- Losses: 6
- Draws: 1

Stephen Foster (born 16 September 1980) is an English professional boxer fighting in the super featherweight division. He is the former European super featherweight champion and is a former holder of the English and WBU titles at featherweight.

== Boxing career ==
=== Amateur career ===
Foster won the 2000 and 2001 Amateur Boxing Association British bantamweight title, when boxing out of the Shannon's ABC.

=== Early professional career ===
Foster's professional debut came on 15 September 2001 with a four-round points win over Andrew Greenway at the MEN Arena in Manchester. Over the rest of 2001 and during the next two years Foster fought on thirteen more occasions and winning each time competing in places such as London, Newcastle, Glasgow, Dagenham and Manchester to build up an unbeaten record of 14–0 at the end of 2003. On 26 February 2004 in his first fight of the new year, Foster defeated the unbeaten Sean Hughes at the Kingsway Leisure Centre in Widnes to win the English featherweight title with a sixth round stoppage. A win over Frenchman Jean-Marie Codet followed before on 1 October 2004, Foster returned to the MEN Arena to defeat Gary Thornhill in the ninth round to make his first successful defence of the title.

=== WBU champion ===
Boasting a record of 17–0 and English champion, Foster begun 2005 with a challenge for the World Boxing Union (WBU) featherweight title on 11 February. The fight, once more at the MEN Arena, resulted in a 10th round victory for Foster over the Colombian Livinson Ruiz. On 16 July 2005, Foster won a non-title fight against Jim Betts at the Bolton Arena and then in another non-title contest drew with Buster Dennis over eight rounds at the ExCeL London. On 1 April 2006, Foster made his first defence of the WBU title against John Simpson at the York Hall, retaining with a decision over 12 rounds. An early stoppage of Frederic Bonifai in another non-title clash followed before making his second defence of the title on 14 October 2006. Returning to the MEN Arena, Foster suffered his first professional defeat at the hands of then unbeaten Derry Mathews, losing the title on points over 12 rounds.

=== Comeback and World title challenge ===
Foster returned to the ring on 14 July 2007, stopping Wladimir Borov in the third round at the O2 Arena and followed this up by once more beating the Frenchman Jean-Marie Codet at the York Hall on 13 October 2007, scoring a first-round KO. On 15 December 2007 just over a year since losing to Mathews, Foster challenged Scotsman Alex Arthur for the interim version of the World Boxing Organisation (WBO) title up at super featherweight. Despite pushing Arthur all the way, the fight at the Meadowbank Sports Centre in Edinburgh resulted in a second career defeat for Foster losing once more on points.

=== European champion ===
Only one fight in the next two years on 31 October 2008, resulted in Foster scoring a win over the journeyman Jason Nesbitt before returning to the ring on 15 January 2010 to defeat the Georgian boxer Kakhaber Avetisian at the Altrincham Leisure Centre. Two more wins in 2010 followed against Youssef Al Hamidi at the Fenton Manor Sports Complex in Stoke-on-Trent and Aleksander Vakhtangashvili at the Ponds Forge Arena in Sheffield, before on 2 October 2010 travelling to Bolton to fight at the De Vere Whites Hotel in a contest for the European super featherweight title. Foster's opponent, the Russian Levan Kirakosyan, had a reputation for winning in the UK and had already beaten the Carl Johanneson twice and on his last visit won the title against Scott Lawton. Signalling his return to the top of British boxing Foster defeated Kirakosyan with a third round stoppage to lift the title.

=== Loss of European title ===
On 26 February 2011 Foster fought Belgian fighter Ermanno Fegatelli. Foster started well and appeared to be in good shape for the first seven rounds but began to fade as Fegatelli took control and started landing a series of damaging body shots. In the 9th Fegatelli hit Foster in the stomach which forced him down. Foster was down a further 3 times in the 10th round all due to body shots. The fight finished 110–114 109–114 109–114 in favour of the challenger and new champion Ermano Fegatilli. Speaking after the fight Foster said that he had been suffering from a virus saying "I thought to myself, 'yeah, I can do it, I've got a week to recover'. And with the training I did – I didn't want to throw anything away, I just wanted to soldier on".

== Genealogical information ==
Stephen Foster is the son of the boxer; Steve "The Viking" Foster.

== Professional boxing record ==
40 fights	33 wins	6 losses
By knockout	19	2
By decision	14	4
Draws	1	

Result	Record	Opponent	Type	Round, time	Date	Location	Notes
Loss	33–6–1	(Republic of Ireland) Jono Carroll	SD	3	2014-12-06	(United Kingdom) York Hall, Bethnal Green	
Win	33–5–1	(Bulgaria) Yordan Vasilev	TKO	3 (6)	2014-09-20	(United Kingdom) De Vere Whites Hotel, Bolton	
Win	32–5–1	(Spain) Santiago Bustos	PTS	6	2014-04-19	(United Kingdom) Phones 4u Arena (formerly M.E.N Arena), Manchester	
Loss	31–5–1	(United Kingdom) Anthony Crolla	RTD	6 (12)	2013-11-23	(United Kingdom) Phones 4u Arena (formerly M.E.N Arena), Manchester	For WBO Inter-Continental Lightweight Title
Win	31–4–1	(United Kingdom) Scott Moises	PTS	4	2013-05-10	(United Kingdom) Wythenshawe Forum, Manchester	
Loss	30–4–1	(United Kingdom) Gary Buckland	RTD	8 (12)	2012-11-24	(United Kingdom) Manchester Arena (formerly M.E.N Arena), Manchester	
Win	30–3–1	(Nicaragua) Miguel Aguilar	PTS	6	2012-04-21	(United Kingdom) Sports Centre, Lord Street, Oldham	
