= Hayemaker Promotions =

Promotional company

Hayemaker Promotions is a promotional company operated by former WBA heavyweight and undisputed cruiserweight champion David Haye. The company held their first boxing promotional event in Sheffield on 20 September 2008.

== Starting Up ==
On establishing the company, David Haye drew comparisons with Golden Boy Promotions when he said; "Golden Boy have taken over from Don King and Bob Arum and they've done it by empowering the fighters, putting control back in their hands and giving them the lion's share". Giving an insight into how the new promotional outfits would actually help fighters he added: "Promoting other fighters is not a money-making scheme for me, I make enough from my own fights, I don't need to take any money from six- to eight-rounders. Taking 15 or 20 grand from a British title fight doesn't mean anything to me, but that extra money means a hell of a lot to someone who's fighting for, say, 10 grand three times a year".

Haye and Booth signed up a number of fighters to their stable. Former WBU champion Derry Mathews signed having previously been with Sports Network, British light-middleweight champion Ryan Rhodes, and trainer Dave Coldwell joined as Head of Boxing.

The outfit also signed a number of up and coming young stars, including Liverpool lightweight John Watson, Sheffield prospect Josh Wale, and former amateur champions George Groves and Michael Maguire. On 27 January 2009, Hayemaker announced the signing of Olympic heavyweight bronze medallist David Price.

== Deal with Setanta ==
Hayemaker signed a deal on 27 May 2008 which would see ten promotions from the company broadcast on Setanta Sports. This would include the next four David Haye fights. The first promotion was held in Sheffield on 20 September 2008, and broadcast 4 live bouts which included the two-time British champion Ryan Rhodes defending his light-middleweight belt against Scotsman Jamie Coyle. The second promotion was held in London and featured David Haye against American Monte Barrett at heavyweight with Haye winning by knockout after 5 rounds.

Two more televised promotions followed before the subscription sports channel went bust in the UK on 23 June 2009. In Liverpool Tony Quigley claimed the British super-middleweight title with a win over Tony Dodson as well as marking the professional debut of David Price. This was followed by a bill in Belfast topped by Martin Lindsay winning the British featherweight title against Scotland's Paul Appleby.

The loss of the television deal meant that opportunities for boxers signed to the stable became rarer and saw fighters like Derry Mathews and David Price split from the promoter. Others such as George Groves signed promotional deals with other promoters whilst continuing to be managed by the company.

== Small hall shows ==
During the term of the deal with Setanta, Hayemaker also promoted a number of non-televised small hall shows in venues such as Rotherham, Sheffield and London's York Hall. They featured local fighters such as former Sheffield United player turned boxer Curtis Woodhouse who topped the bill at Rotherham's Consort Hotel on a two-fight dinner card, as well as at his former club's ground in Bramall Lane. George Groves topped the bill at the first Haymemaker promotion to be held at the York Hall.

== 2016 return ==
On 24 November 2015, Haye and his new promotion and management team, Salter Brothers Entertainment, announced his comeback fight against WBA #10 ranked heavyweight Mark de Mori. The fight took place on 16 January 2016 (marketed by Salter Brothers Entertainment as "Haye Day") at the O2 Arena in London, and was Haye's first fight in more than three years since stopping Derek Chisora in 2012. Coming into the fight, Australian De Mori had lost only once in 33 career bouts and 26 of his 29 victories had come via knockout, albeit against limited opposition. It was announced on 6 January 2016 that Haye and the Salter Brothers had struck a deal for the comeback fight to be shown on free-to-air entertainment channel Dave, the largest non-PSB broadcaster in the UK and the channel's first ever live sport broadcast. Salter Brothers Entertainment also partnered with YouTube to live-stream the event outside of the UK to a global audience for free.

On 20 January 2017, Haye announced he would combine his Hayemaker promotions with Richard Schaefer's Ringstar Sport to create Hayemaker Ringstar, which would be based in the UK and rival Eddie Hearn's Matchroom Sport and Frank Warren's Queensberry Promotions. They would also promote shows in the US. Shaefer stated in a press release that he had intended to promote in the UK for some years and spoke of his excitement to be in partnership with Haye.

At an official press conference on 12 July 2017, Hayemaker Ringstar announced they had agreed a TV rights deal with the biggest multichannel broadcaster in the UK, UKTV, for entertainment channel Dave. The deal would be for 3 years which would show five fight nights per year. Hayemaker Ringstar also introduced its latest signings, Olympics silver medalist, heavyweight Joe Joyce, Olympian Qais Ashfaq, European champion Willy Hutchinson and former 10-time world kickboxing champion Michael 'Venom' Page.

On 6 September 2017, an official announcement was made for the first boxing event which would take place at Indigo, The O2 arena in London on 20 October 2017. Haye confirmed that Joe Joyce would headline the card, making his debut against experienced former WBO Inter-Continental champion Ian Lewison (12-3, 8 KOs).

== See also ==
- Hatton Promotions
