= Gary Buckland =

Welsh boxer (born 1986)

Personal information
- Nickname: Dynamo
- Born: 12 June 1986 (age 40) Rumney, Cardiff, Wales
- Height: 5 ft 7 in (170 cm)
- Weight: Super Featherweight; Lightweight

Boxing career
- Reach: British
- Stance: Orthodox

Boxing record
- Total fights: 38
- Wins: 31
- Win by KO: 10
- Losses: 7

Gary Buckland (born 12 June 1986) is a Welsh former professional boxer who competed from 2005 to 2016. He held the British super featherweight title from 2011 to 2013. He also challenged for the British and EBU European lightweight titles in 2010; the British super featherweight title in 2013; and the Commonwealth lightweight title in 2014.

== Professional career ==
Buckland's professional debut came on 5 March 2005 with a four-round points win over Warren Dunkley at the Goresbrook Leisure Centre in Dagenham. He fought three more times that year scoring wins on each occasion and fighting in London, Plymouth and Bristol. Five fights the following year in 2006 resulted in five more wins including two victories over Judex Meema and a trip to Spain for a points win over Ubadel Soto. On 3 March 2007 in his first fight of the year and now boasting an unbeaten record of 9–0 Buckland defeated Stuart Phillips at the Newport Leisure Centre to win the Welsh Area title. A win over journeyman Carl Allen followed before on 5 October 2007 Buckland defeated Martin Watson over 10 rounds to lift the Celtic version of the lightweight title.

=== Defeat and regroup ===
Now with a record of 11–0, Buckland begun 2008 with wins over journeymen Alex Spitko and Ali Wyatt before on 13 June 2008 losing for the first time to Hove's Ben Murphy in a six-round points defeat. Buckland bounced back from the defeat on 27 February 2009 travelling to Barnsley and scoring a 10-round shut out against Craig Docherty in another Celtic title fight. His next contest was to be an eliminator for the full British title with England's Henry Castle his opponent. The fight in Newport resulted in another 10 round points win for Buckland against a man who had recently impressed with wins over Graham Earl, Ryan Barrett and Kevin O'Hara. A first round win over Hungarian Istvan Nagy on 13 November 2009 topped off a successful year for the Welshman.

=== British and European title challenge ===
On 19 February 2010 Buckland scored possibly his biggest win to date with a 12-round victory in a Commonwealth title eliminator against Uganda's Sam Rukundo. Rukundo, based in Sweden, was undefeated with 15 wins and only one draw before losing that record to Buckland at a fight in Stoke. Already in contention for a shot at the British title, the win had put him in the frame for a shot at the European title too. His opponent for both titles on 7 May 2010 was the current European number one contender and British champion, John Murray. The fight took place at the Kingsway Leisure Center in Widnes and ended with a second career defeat for Buckland with Murray proving to be just too strong, winning in the 11th round.

=== Prizefighter win ===
On 20 November 2010 Buckland moved down to super featherweight and competed in the 15th prizefighter competition shown live on Sky Sports. The Barry Hearn promoted tournament pitched 8 fighters in a knock out style competition over one evening with the winner walking away with prize money of £32,000. In the quarter finals Buckland was matched against former amateur star Steven Bell winning over 3 rounds on all the judges scorecards. In the semi-final Buckland pulled off one of the upsets of the year with a first-round knockout of the pre-tournament favourite and reigning British champion Gary Sykes. In the final Buckland met Derry Mathews the former WBU champion and former young boxer of the year. Mathews had beaten Gary McArthur by stoppage in the quarters and then engaged in a gruelling contest with Choi Tseveenpurev in the semis to book his place in the final. The fight resulted in another stoppage win for Buckland with a devastating punch to the solar plexus in the 2nd round proving too much for Mathews to recover from. Of his win Buckland said "I'm feeling on top of the world". He added "I'd done a good 10 weeks of training and I knew it was going to be a hard competition. This is the best thing that has ever happened to me, so far."

=== British champion ===
Buckland followed up his Prizefighter win with a victory over Oscar Chacin at the MEN Arena on 16 April 2011 and travelling to Mexico to beat Jose Roberto Gonzalez on 18 June 2011. His opportunity to fight for the super featherweight version of the British title came on 24 September 2011, with Buckland beating reigning champion Gary Sykes in a close back and forth contest over 12 rounds.

== Professional boxing record ==
38 fights	31 wins	7 losses
By knockout	10	2
By decision	21	5

Key to abbreviations used for results
DQ	Disqualification	RTD	Corner retirement
KO	Knockout	SD	Split decision / split draw
MD	Majority decision / majority draw	TD	Technical decision / technical draw
NC	No contest	TKO	Technical knockout
PTS	Points decision	UD	Unanimous decision / unanimous draw

Boxing record
No.	Result	Record	Opponent	Type	Round(s)	Time	Date	Location	Notes
38	Win	31–7	(United Kingdom) Matty Fagan	PTS	6	N/a	16 Jul 2016	(United Kingdom) Ice Arena Wales, Cardiff, Wales, UK	
37	Loss	30–7	(United Kingdom) Sean Dodd	PTS	10	N/a	19 Sep 2015	(United Kingdom) Liverpool Olympia, Liverpool, Merseyside, UK	
36	Win	30–6	(Georgia (country)) Giorgi Gachechiladze	TKO	3 (8)	2:46	19 Jun 2015	(United Kingdom) Newport Centre, Newport, Wales, UK	
35	Loss	29–6	(Republic of Ireland) Jono Carroll	SD	3	N/a	6 Dec 2014	(United Kingdom) York Hall, Bethnal Green, Greater London, UK	Prizefighter: The Lightweights III – Semi-final
34	Win	29–5	(United Kingdom) Floyd Moore	UD	3	N/a	6 Dec 2014	(United Kingdom) York Hall, Bethnal Green, Greater London, UK	Prizefighter: The Lightweights III – Quarter-final
33	Loss	28–5	(Ghana) Richard Commey	UD	12	N/a	12 Jul 2014	(United Kingdom) York Hall, Bethnal Green, Greater London, UK	For vacant Commonwealth lightweight title
32	Loss	28–4	(United Kingdom) Gavin Rees	SD	12	N/a	17 May 2014	(United Kingdom) Cardiff International Arena, Cardiff, Wales, UK	
31	Win	28–3	(United Kingdom) Gavin Rees	SD	12	N/a	1 Feb 2014	(United Kingdom) Cardiff International Arena, Cardiff, Wales, UK	
30	Loss	27–3	(United Kingdom) Stephen Smith	KO	5 (12)	1:14	17 Aug 2013	(United Kingdom) Cardiff International Arena, Cardiff, Wales, UK	Lost British super featherweight title
29	Win	27–2	(United Kingdom) Stephen Foster	RTD	8 (12)	3:00	24 Nov 2012	(United Kingdom) Manchester Arena, Manchester, Greater Manchester, UK	Retained British super featherweight title
28	Win	26–2	(Netherlands) Innocent Anyanwu	PTS	8	N/a	21 Jul 2012	(United Kingdom) Newport Centre, Newport, Wales, UK	
27	Win	25–2	(United Kingdom) Paul Truscott	UD	12	N/a	24 Mar 2012	(United Kingdom) Ponds Forge Arena, Sheffield, South Yorkshire, UK	Retained British super featherweight title
26	Win	24–2	(United Kingdom) Gary Sykes	UD	12	N/a	24 Sep 2011	(United Kingdom) Ponds Forge Arena, Sheffield, South Yorkshire, UK	Won British super featherweight title
25	Win	23–2	(Mexico) Jose Gonzalez Ayala	UD	6	N/a	18 Jun 2011	Arena VFG, Tlajomulco de Zúñiga, Jalisco, Mexico	
24	Win	22–2	(Venezuela) Oscar Chacin	PTS	8	N/a	16 Apr 2011	(United Kingdom) Manchester Arena, Manchester, Greater Manchester, UK	
23	Win	21–2	(United Kingdom) Derry Mathews	KO	2 (3)	1:28	20 Nov 2010	(United Kingdom) York Hall, Bethnal Green, Greater London, UK	Prizefighter: The Super Featherweights – Final
22	Win	20–2	(United Kingdom) Gary Sykes	KO	1 (3)	0:45	20 Nov 2010	(United Kingdom) York Hall, Bethnal Green, Greater London, UK	Prizefighter: The Super Featherweights – Semi-final
21	Win	19–2	(United Kingdom) Stevie Bell	UD	3	N/a	20 Nov 2010	(United Kingdom) York Hall, Bethnal Green, Greater London, UK	Prizefighter: The Super Featherweights – Quarter-final

Sporting positions
Regional boxing titles
Previous: Gary Sykes	British super featherweight champion 24 September 2011 – 17 August 2013	Succeeded by Stephen Smith
