= Martin Lindsay =

Martin Lindsay may refer to:

- Sir Martin Lindsay, 1st Baronet (1905–1981) British army officer, polar explorer and politician
- Martin Lindsay (boxer) (born 1982), Irish professional boxer
