= Jono Carroll =

Irish boxer (born 1992)

Personal information
- Nicknames: King Kong; Celtic Warrior
- Born: Jonathan Beresford; 12 April 1992 (age 34) Dublin, Ireland
- Height: 5 ft 7 in (170 cm)
- Weight: Super-featherweight; Lightweight

Boxing career
- Stance: Southpaw

Boxing record
- Total fights: 30
- Wins: 26
- Win by KO: 7
- Losses: 3
- Draws: 1

Jonathan Beresford (born 12 April 1992), better known as Jono Carroll, is an Irish professional boxer who has held the IBO super-featherweight title since March 2026. He also challenged for the IBF junior-lightweight title in 2019 and the interim WBA super-featherweight title in 2024.

== Professional career ==
Carroll began his pro career while in Australia in 2012. After building a 2–0 record he returned home to Dublin where he began fighting under Paschal "Packie" Collins, out of Celtic Warrior Gym, Blanchardstown.

=== Irish debut ===
Carroll made his Irish professional debut in November 2014, when he faced Declan Geraghty at the 3Arena. On the undercard of Matthew Macklin vs. Jorge Sebastian Heiland, promoter Eddie Hearn confirmed that the winner would earn a slot at the following month's Prizefighter tournament in London. Carroll and Geraghty went on to produce 'Fight of the Night', in a bout which ended in the fourth round when Geraghty was disqualified for persistent use of the head, that same fight would go on to win Irish fight of the year.

=== Prizefighter champion ===
Carroll really stepped into the limelight when he accepted the invitation and became Prizefighter champion in December. The Dubliner was a relative unknown to British audiences when he defied the odds to defeat Stephen Foster, Gary Buckland, and Michael Devine to take the lightweight title. Carroll subsequently signed a promotional deal with Eddie Hearn and Matchroom Sport.

=== Following Prizefighter ===
Despite being booked to appear on the undercard of teammate Spike O'Sullivan vs. Chris Eubank Jr, Carroll accepted a different fight at just a week's notice. On the Wladimir Klitschko vs. Tyson Fury card in Düsseldorf, Carroll agreed to the longest bout of his career so far, a ten rounder with Miguel Gonzalez. Despite the timing, Carroll outclassed the Honduran from start to finish, winning every round on the way to a unanimous decision victory. "I just went out there and enjoyed myself," he told Sky Sports afterwards. "Because I never fought 10 rounds, I wanted to see what it was all about. I wanted to get through without any injuries. I'm pretty proud of that."

==== Carroll vs. Quigg ====
On 7 March 2020, Carroll fought former world champion Scott Quigg. Carroll dominated Quigg over the whole fight and managed to stop him in the eleventh round to earn the TKO victory.

==== Carroll vs. Hughes ====
Carroll fought Maxi Hughes at LS-Live in Wakefield, England, on 12 August 2020, losing via unanimous decision.

==== Carroll vs. Vences ====
On 11 September 2021 at the Seminole Hard Rock Hotel & Casino Hollywood, Florida, USA, Carroll fought Andy Vences, then ranked as #7 at super-featherweight by the WBA. He won the fight via majority decision, with the scorecards reading 97–93, 97–93 and 95–95 in his favour.

==== Carroll vs. Batyrgaziev ====
Carroll faced Albert Batyrgaziev for the vacant interim WBA super-featherweight title at the IBA Colosseum in Serpukhov, Russia, on 12 July 2024. He lost by technical knockout in the ninth round.

==== Carroll vs. Murphy ====
On 14 March 2026, Carroll fought Colm Murphy for the vacant IBO super-featherweight title at the 3Arena in Dublin. He won via split decision. Two judges scored the bout 117–111 and 116–112 in his favour overruling the third who had it 116–112 for his opponent.

== Professional boxing record ==
30 fights	26 wins	3 losses
By knockout	7	1
By decision	18	2
By disqualification	1	0
Draws	1	

No.	Result	Record	Opponent	Type	Round, time	Date	Location	Notes
30	Win	26–3–1	Colm Murphy	SD	12	14 Mar 2026	3Arena, Dublin, Ireland	Won vacant IBO super-featherweight title
29	Win	25–3–1	Alexander Prado	UD	8	15 Mar 2025	Jumeirah Golf Estates Club House, Dubai, United Arab Emirates	
28	Loss	24–3–1	Albert Batyrgaziev	TKO	9 (12), 2:23	12 Jul 2024	IBA Colosseum, Serpukhov, Russia	For vacant interim WBA super-featherweight title
27	Win	24–2–1	Miguel Marriaga	UD	10	18 Mar 2023	Agenda Arena, Dubai, United Arab Emirates	
26	Win	23–2–1	James Chereji	UD	8	2 Dec 2022	Humo Arena, Tashkent, Uzbekistan	
25	Win	22–2–1	Patrick Ayi Aryee	TKO	4 (10), 2:07	18 Mar 2022	Aviation Club Tennis Centre, Dubai, United Arab Emirates	
24	Win	21–2–1	Aelio Mesquita	KO	2 (8), 2:27	11 Dec 2021	Coca-Cola Arena, Dubai, United Arab Emirates	
23	Win	20–2–1	Andy Vences	MD	10	11 Sep 2021	Seminole Hard Rock Hotel & Casino Hollywood, Florida, US	
22	Win	19–2–1	Romic Airapetean	RTD	4 (8), 3:00	27 Mar 2021	Club Saga Heredia, Málaga, Spain	
21	Loss	18–2–1	Maxi Hughes	UD	10	12 Aug 2020	LS-Live, Wakefield, England	
20	Win	18–1–1	Scott Quigg	TKO	11 (12), 2:14	7 Mar 2020	Manchester Arena, Manchester, England	
19	Win	17–1–1	Eleazar Valenzuela	UD	10	24 Aug 2019	Centro de Usos Multiples, Hermosillo, Mexico	
18	Loss	16–1–1	Tevin Farmer	UD	12	15 Mar 2019	Liacouras Center, Philadelphia, Pennsylvania, US	For IBF junior-lightweight title
17	Draw	16–0–1	Guillaume Frenois	SD	12	8 Dec 2018	Sheffield Arena, Sheffield, England	
16	Win	16–0	Declan Geraghty	TKO	9 (12), 2:12	30 Jun 2018	Odyssey Arena, Belfast, Northern Ireland	Retained IBF Inter-Continental junior-lightweight title
15	Win	15–0	Humberto de Santiago	TKO	3 (12), 2:16	18 Nov 2017	The SSE Arena, Belfast, Northern Ireland	Won vacant IBF Inter-Continental junior-lightweight title
14	Win	14–0	John Quigley	SD	12	17 Jun 2017	Waterfront Hall, Belfast, Northern Ireland	Won vacant IBF European junior-lightweight title
13	Win	13–0	Juan Luis Gonzalez	PTS	8	3 Dec 2016	Lagoon Leisure Centre, Paisley, Scotland	
12	Win	12–0	Damian Lawniczak	PTS	6	29 Oct 2016	Meadowbank Sports Centre, Edinburgh, Scotland	
11	Win	11–0	Simas Volosinas	PTS	4	24 Sep 2016	Tudor Grange Leisure Centre, Solihull, England	
10	Win	10–0	Jordan Ellison	PTS	6	7 May 2016	Manchester Arena, Manchester, England	
9	Win	9–0	Miguel Gonzalez	UD	10	28 Nov 2015	ESPRIT arena, Düsseldorf, Germany	
8	Win	8–0	Barrington Brown	TD	5 (6), 1:02	18 Jul 2015	Manchester Arena, Manchester, England	Technical decision after Carroll cut from accidental head clash
7	Win	7–0	Carlos Perez	PTS	6	11 Apr 2015	First Direct Arena, Leeds, England	
6	Win	6–0	Michael Devine	UD	3	6 Dec 2014	York Hall, London, England	Prizefighter: The Lightweights III – Final
5	Win	5–0	Gary Buckland	UD	3	6 Dec 2014	York Hall, London, England	Prizefighter: The Lightweights III – Semi-final
4	Win	4–0	Stephen Foster	SD	3	6 Dec 2014	York Hall, London, England	Prizefighter: The Lightweights III – Quarter-final
3	Win	3–0	Declan Geraghty	DQ	4 (4), 0:56	15 Nov 2014	3Arena, Dublin, Ireland	Geraghty disqualified for head butt
2	Win	2–0	Pornchai Sithpajuk	KO	2 (4), 1:21	7 Dec 2013	Kingsway Indoor Stadium, Perth, Australia	
1	Win	1–0	Matthew Seden	UD	4	16 Dec 2012	WA Italian Club, Perth, Australia	
