= Choi Tseveenpurev =

Mongolian boxer (born 1971)

Personal information
- Nationality: Mongolian
- Born: Choijiljavyn Tseveenpürev; 6 October 1971 (age 55) Ulaanbaatar, Mongolia
- Height: 5 ft 6 in (1.68 m)
- Weight: Featherweight

Boxing career
- Reach: 65 in (165 cm)
- Stance: Orthodox

Boxing record
- Total fights: 44
- Wins: 36
- Win by KO: 24
- Losses: 7
- Draws: 1
- No contests: 0

Choijiljavyn "Choi" Tseveenpürev (Mongolian: Чойжилжавын Цэвээнпүрэв; born 6 October 1971) is a Mongolian featherweight boxer based in the United Kingdom. Tseveenpurev won the Prizefighter series Featherweights tournament on 29 October 2011, the same month that he passed 40. This followed a ten-round victory on 18 June 2011 over former IBO featherweight champion Jackson Asiku – a fight nominated for the British boxing fight of the year.

== Career ==
Tseveenpurev, known as the Mongol Warrior, began his career with ten-rounders as an away fighter in South Korea and Thailand fighting legendary former and future world champion Veeraphol Sahaprom in only his third contest. This is one of only 7 defeats, all by points verdicts.

His boxing career saw him travel to Finland, Russia, South Korea, Thailand, Indonesia and China before settling in the UK in 2000. Tseveenpurev is currently trained by promoter Spencer Fearon, having previously worked with Jack Doughty and Lee Wilkins.

On 6 June 2008, he was awarded with the title of 'State Honoured Athlete' by the Mongolian President, Nambaryn Enkhbayar.

He won the vacant World Boxing Foundation (WBFo) title by knocking out David Kiilu in the third round. Tseveenpurev defended the title twice before becoming the WBU Featherweight champion with a destructive win over Derry Mathews in Bolton on 5 April 2008.

During the bout, Tseveenpurev was described as "Britain's answer to Manny Pacquiao" by boxing commentator John Rawling. With his unrelenting style and similar trademark ponytail, Choi has also been compared to Hall of Fame boxer Kostya Tszyu. Tseveenpurev himself lists Tszyu as his idol, along with Roberto Durán.

There followed a 15-month period of inactivity described as "criminal" by UK publication Boxing News which led him to briefly to retire, before returning to the ring with Spencer Fearon's Hard Knocks Boxing Promotions in June 2009.

In his first fight under the Hard Knocks banner, Tseveenpurev beat Lubos Prehradnik in three rounds on 11 July, his country's Independence Day in front of many of his countrymen who were earlier at London's Naadam celebrations. The crowd was described by boxing pundit Steve Bunce as the most passionate in British boxing for 30 years.

As of March 23, 2012, he holds the WBC International Silver Title belt, after knocking out Bastien Rozeaux in the eighth round, to claim the vacant WBC Silver Featherweight title

In May 2012 Daud Yordan claimed the IBO Featherweight World Championship title. Tseveenpurev lost by a decision to Yordan in a championship fight on November 9, 2012, in a decision.

== Professional boxing record ==
44 fights	36 wins	7 losses
By knockout	24	0
By decision	12	7
Draws	1	

No.	Result	Record	Opponent	Type	Round, Time	Date	Location	Notes
44	Draw	36–7–1	Hyun Sunwoo	MD	6	19 Jul 2014	Inter-Burgo Hotel, Wonju, South Korea	
43	Loss	36–7	John Simpson	UD	12	11 May 2013	Emirates Arena, Glasgow, Scotland	For vacant WBC International Silver super-featherweight title
42	Loss	36–6	Daud Yordan	UD	12	9 Nov 2012	Marina Bay Sands Hotel, Singapore	For IBO featherweight title
41	Win	36–5	Bastien Rozeaux	TKO	8 (10), 0:18	23 Mar 2012	The Troxy, Limehouse, England	Won vacant WBC International Silver featherweight title
40	Win	35–5	Rhys Roberts	UD	3	29 Oct 2011	York Hall, Bethnal Green, England	'Prizefight' Tournament featherweight final
39	Win	34–5	George Jupp	UD	3	29 Oct 2011	York Hall, Bethnal Green, England	'Prizefighter' Toyrnament featherweight semi-final
38	Win	33–5	Lee Glover	TKO	2 (3), 1:02	29 Oct 2011	York Hall, Bethnal Green, England	'Prizefighter' Tournament featherweight quarter-final
37	Win	32–5	Janis Puksins	TKO	2 (4), 1:46	7 Oct 2011	York Hall, Bethnal Green, England	
36	Win	31–5	Jackson Asiku	PTS	10	18 Jun 2011	York Hall, Bethnal Green, England	
35	Loss	30–5	Derry Mathews	UD	3	20 Nov 2010	York Hall, Bethnal Green, England	'Prizefighter' Tournament super-featherweight semi-final
34	Win	30–4	Ben Murphy	UD	3	20 Nov 2010	York Hall, Bethnal Green, England	'Prizefighter' Tournament super-featherweight quarter-final
33	Win	29–4	Mickey Coveney	KO	3 (6), 2:22	4 Jun 2010	York Hall, Bethnal Green, England	
32	Win	28–4	Lubos Priehradnik	TKO	3 (4), 1:05	11 Jul 2009	Kensington Town Hall, Kensington, England	
31	Win	27–4	Derry Mathews	KO	5 (12), 3:00	5 Apr 2008	Bolton Arena, Bolton, England	Won WBU featherweight title
30	Win	26–4	Ajibu Salum	KO	2 (6), 0:32	2 Dec 2007	Sports Center, Lord Street, Oldham, England	
29	Win	25–4	Abdul Tebazalwa	SD	12	7 Oct 2007	Tara Leisure Centre, Shaw, England	Retained WBF featherweight title
28	Win	24–4	Nikoliz Berkatsashvili	KO	4 (12), 1:55	11 Mar 2007	Tara Leisure Centre, Shaw, England	Retained WBF featherweight title
27	Win	23–4	David Kiilu	TKO	3 (12), 1:06	2 Apr 2006	Tara Leisure Centre, Shaw, England	Won vacant WBF featherweight title
26	Win	22–4	Aliaksei Volchan	TKO	10 (10), 2:06	20 Nov 2005	Tara Leisure Centre, Shaw, England	Won vacant WBF (World Boxing Foundation not World Boxing Federation) International featherweight title
25	Win	21–4	Harry Ramogoadi	TKO	5 (10), 2:16	6 Mar 2005	Tara Leisure Centre, Shaw, England	
24	Win	20–4	Harry Ramogoadi	RTD	6 (10), 3:00	10 Jul 2004	AT7 Centre, Coventry, England	
23	Win	19–4	Kevin O'Hara	PTS	8	6 May 2004	Metrodome, Barnsley, England	
22	Loss	18–4	Lehlo Ledwaba	MD	8	13 Mar 2004	Brøndby Hallen, Brøndby, Denmark	
21	Win	18–3	John Mackay	TKO	3 (6), 1:16	29 Feb 2004	Tara Leisure Centre, Shaw, England	
20	Win	17–3	Daniel Thorpe	PTS	8	8 Jun 2003	Tara Leisure Centre, Shaw, England	
19	Win	16–3	Jason Nesbitt	PTS	8	9 Mar 2003	Tara Leisure Centre, Shaw, England	
18	Win	15–3	Peter Allen	TKO	4 (6), 2:41	17 Nov 2002	Tara Leisure Centre, Shaw, England	
17	Win	14–3	John Mackay	TKO	5 (6), 0:44	2 Jun 2002	Tara Leisure Centre, Shaw, England	
16	Win	13–3	Chris Emanuele	PTS	4	22 Mar 2002	AT7 Centre, Coventry, England	
15	Win	12–3	Kevin Gerowski	TKO	5 (10), 0:50	9 Dec 2001	Tara Leisure Centre, Shaw, England	
14	Win	11–3	Livinson Ruiz	PTS	4	6 Oct 2001	Wythenshawe Forum, Manchester, England	
13	Win	10–3	Steve Hanley	PTS	6	23 Sep 2001	Tara Leisure Centre, Shaw, England	
12	Loss	9–3	Willie Limond	PTS	6	27 Apr 2001	Thistle Hotel, Glasgow, Scotland	
11	Win	9–2	Chris Williams	PTS	4	3 Dec 2000	Tara Leisure Centre, Shaw, England	
10	Win	8–2	Billy Smith	RTD	2 (4)	24 Sep 2000	Tara Leisure Centre, Shaw, England	Smith retired with damaged hand
9	Win	7–2	David Jeffrey	KO	2 (6), 2:00	21 May 2000	Tara Leisure Centre, Shaw, England	
8	Win	6–2	Kon Rucksa	KO	4 (?)	22 Aug 1999	Shenyang, China	
7	Win	5–2	Jiao Hasabayar	TKO	4 (?)	12 Aug 1999	Ulaanbaatar, Mongolia	
6	Loss	4–2	Bulan Bugiarso	UD	12	1 May 1999	Stadium Sudirman, Bojonegoro, Indonesia	For PABA super-bantamweight title
5	Win	4–1	Ekarat 13Rientower	TKO	2 (?)	7 Jan 1999	Krabi, Thailand	
4	Win	3–1	Surapol Sithnaruepol	KO	1 (?)	2 Oct 1998	Bangkok, Thailand	
3	Loss	2–1	Veeraphol Sahaprom	PTS	10	19 Aug 1998	Bangkok, Thailand	
2	Win	2–0	Hee Youn Kwon	KO	9 (10)	27 Jun 1997	Busan, South Korea	
1	Win	1–0	Jeung Tae Kim	KO	8 (?)	22 Nov 1996	Seoul, South Korea	
