= Evgeny Gradovich =

Russian boxer (born 1986)

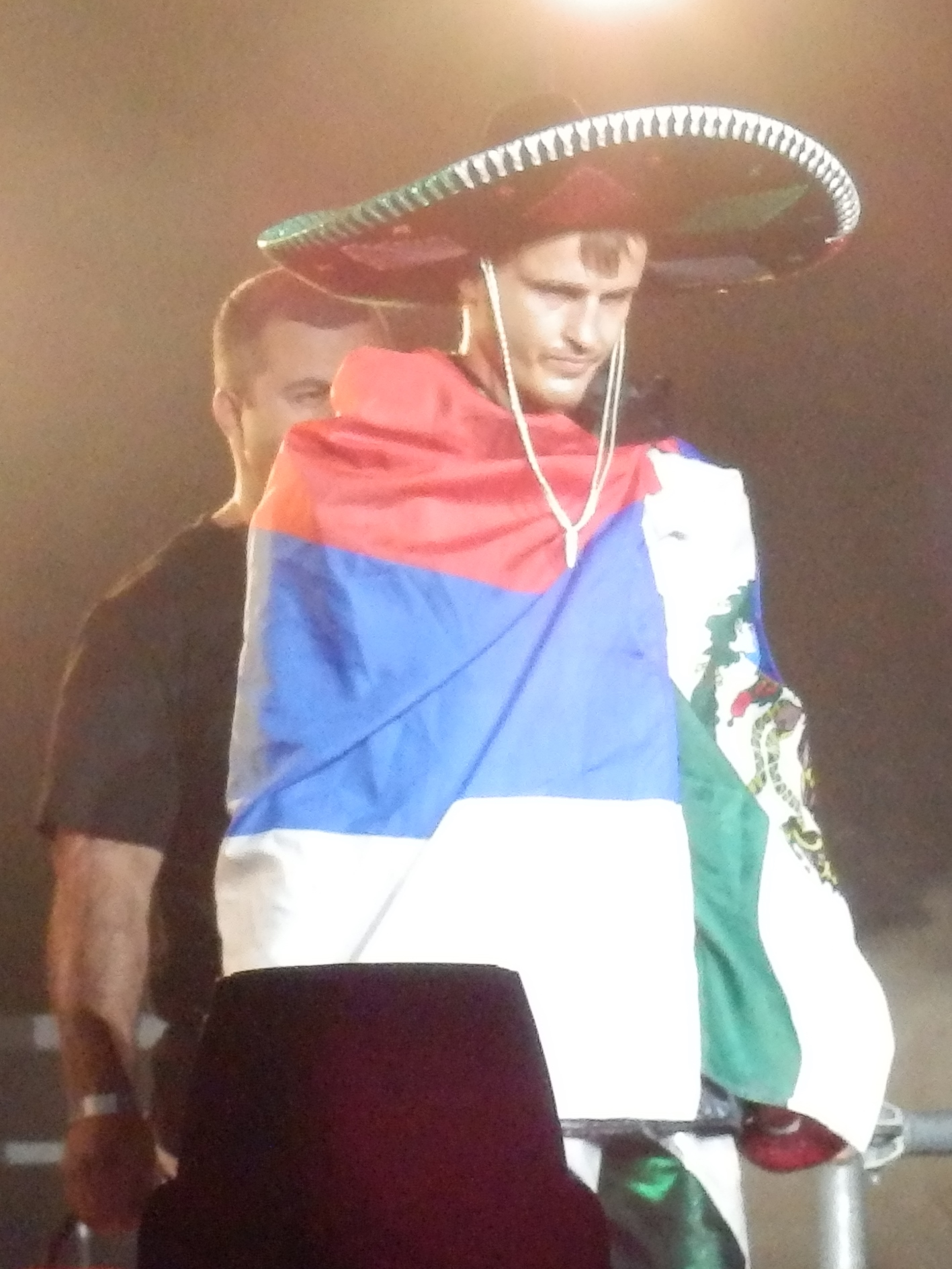
- Gradovich in 2016

Personal information
- Native name: Евгений Градович
- Nicknames: El Ruso Mexicano ("The Mexican Russian"); Mini Destructor
- Nationality: Russian
- Born: Evgeny Pavlovich Gradovich; 7 August 1986 (age 39) Igrim, Khanty-Mansi Autonomous Okrug, Russian SFSR, Soviet Union
- Height: 1.73 m (5 ft 8 in)
- Weight: Super bantamweight; Featherweight; Super featherweight

Boxing career
- Reach: 170 cm (67 in)
- Stance: Orthodox

Boxing record
- Total fights: 26
- Wins: 23
- Win by KO: 9
- Losses: 2
- Draws: 1

Evgeny Pavlovich Gradovich (Russian: Евгений Павлович Градович; born 7 August 1986) is a Russian former professional boxer who competed from 2010 to 2017, and held the IBF featherweight title from 2013 to 2015.

== Amateur career ==
During his amateur career in Russia, Gradovich compiled a record of 127 wins and 23 losses, and made it on the Russian national boxing team.

== Professional career ==
In April 2011, Gradovich beat undefeated Aalan Martínez at the Cosmopolitan Resort in Paradise, Nevada.

=== IBF featherweight champion ===
On 1 March 2013, Gradovich scored an upset win over Billy Dib to take his IBF Featherweight Championship. This bout was televised on ESPN2. In June 2013, Gradovich successfully made first title defence by defeating Argentine Mauricio Munoz in a one-sided contest. On 24 November 2013, he fought again against Dib, on the Manny Pacquiao vs. Brandon Rios undercard. Gradovich dominated the fight, winning by TKO in the 9th round.

== Professional boxing record ==
26 fights	23 wins	2 losses
By knockout	9	1
By decision	14	1
Draws	1	

No.	Result	Record	Opponent	Type	Round, time	Date	Location	Notes
26	Win	23–2–1	Hugo Berrio	MD	12	5 May 2017	Palace of Sporting Games, Yekaterinburg, Russia	Won WBA Inter-Continental and vacant WBO Inter-Continental super bantamweight titles
25	Win	22–2–1	Eusebio Osejo	SD	10	9 Sep 2016	Traktor Ice Arena, Chelyabinsk, Russia	
24	Loss	21–2–1	Óscar Valdez	TKO	4 (12), 2:14	9 Apr 2016	MGM Grand Garden Arena, Paradise, Nevada, US	For vacant NABO featherweight title
23	Win	21–1–1	Jesus Galicia	MD	10	9 Jan 2016	Centro Deportivo Boxing Unitres, Picanya, Spain	
22	Win	20–1–1	Aldimar Silva Santos	SD	8	24 Oct 2015	CenturyLink Center, Omaha, Nebraska, US	
21	Loss	19–1–1	Lee Selby	TD	8 (12), 1:00	30 May 2015	The O2 Arena, London, England	Lost IBF featherweight title; Unanimous TD: Gradovich cut from an accidental head clash
20	Draw	19–0–1	Jayson Vélez	SD	12	29 Nov 2014	CenturyLink Center, Omaha, Nebraska, US	Retained IBF featherweight title
19	Win	19–0	Alex Miskirtchian	UD	12	31 May 2014	Cotai Arena, Macau, SAR	Retained IBF featherweight title
18	Win	18–0	Billy Dib	TKO	9 (12), 1:10	23 Nov 2013	Cotai Arena, Macau, SAR	Retained IBF featherweight title
17	Win	17–0	Mauricio Javier Munoz	UD	12	27 Jul 2013	Cotai Arena, Macau, SAR	Retained IBF featherweight title
16	Win	16–0	Billy Dib	SD	12	1 Mar 2013	MGM Grand at Foxwoods, Ledyard, Connecticut, US	Won IBF featherweight title
15	Win	15–0	Willie Villanueva	TKO	7 (8), 2:03	6 Dec 2012	The Mirage, Paradise, Nevada, US	
14	Win	14–0	José Ángel Beranza	UD	8	13 Oct 2012	Home Depot Center, Carson, California, US	
13	Win	13–0	Francisco Leal	KO	10 (10), 2:15	31 Mar 2012	Illusions Theater, San Antonio, Texas, US	
12	Win	12–0	Robert Osiobe	UD	6	3 Feb 2012	Texas Station, North Las Vegas, Nevada, US	
11	Win	11–0	Robert DaLuz	UD	8	19 Aug 2011	Horseshoe Casino, Hammond, Indiana, US	
10	Win	10–0	Aalan Martinez	UD	6	29 Apr 2011	Cosmopolitan of Las Vegas, Paradise, Nevada, US	
9	Win	9–0	Francisco Reyes	UD	10	19 Mar 2011	Emerald Queen Casino, Tacoma, Washington, US	
8	Win	8–0	Tommy Atencio	TKO	4 (6), 1:59	17 Dec 2010	UIC Pavilion, Chicago, Illinois, US	
7	Win	7–0	Jesse Caradine	UD	6	3 Dec 2010	World Congress Center, Atlanta, Georgia, US	
6	Win	6–0	Cordaro Simpkins	TKO	5 (6), 1:39	29 Oct 2010	Blake Hotel, Charlotte, North Carolina, US	
5	Win	5–0	Steven Johnson	TKO	3 (6), 2:14	19 Sep 2010	UIC Pavilion, Chicago, Illinois, US	
4	Win	4–0	Manuel Ortega	UD	4	19 Jun 2010	Emerald Queen Casino, Tacoma, Washington, US	
3	Win	3–0	Andrew Barnes	TKO	2 (4), 0:37	15 May 2010	The Fillmore, Charlotte, North Carolina, US	
2	Win	2–0	Benjamin Rivera	KO	3 (4), 1:54	10 Apr 2010	Agua Caliente Casino Resort Spa, Rancho Mirage, California, US	
1	Win	1–0	Travis Bedwell	TKO	1 (4), 1:55	19 Mar 2010	Derby Park Expo, Louisville, Kentucky, US	

Sporting positions
Regional boxing titles
Preceded by Hugo Berrio	WBA Inter-Continental super bantamweight champion 5 May 2017 – 20 December 2017; Retired	Vacant Title next held by Murodjon Akhmadaliev
Vacant Title last held by Cesar Juarez	WBO Inter-Continental super bantamweight champion 5 May 2017 – 20 December 2017; Retired	Vacant Title next held by Albert Pagara
World boxing titles
Preceded by Billy Dib	IBF featherweight champion 1 March 2013 – 30 May 2015	Succeeded by Lee Selby
