= Paul Truscott =

British boxer (born 1986)

Personal information
- Nickname: Trussy
- Nationality: British
- Born: Paul Truscott; 1 May 1986 (age 40) Middlesbrough, Yorkshire, UK
- Height: 1.75 m (5 ft 9 in)
- Weight: Featherweight

Boxing career
- Stance: Orthodox

Boxing record
- Total fights: 24
- Wins: 19
- Win by KO: 3
- Losses: 5
- Draws: 0
- No contests: 0

Paul Truscott (born 1 May 1986) is a British professional boxer and former Commonwealth featherweight champion.

== Professional career ==
=== Early career ===
Truscott made his professional debut in June 2006 at the Winter Gardens in Blackpool, with a win over experienced journeyman Billy Smith. His first pro fight in his native town of Middlesbrough came the fight after he defeated Steve Gethin at the Eston Sports Academy, with both wins coming after 4 rounds. His winning record continued with victories including, amongst others, the tough Ben Odamattey and Riaz Durgahed on his way to compiling a 10-0 record.

=== Commonwealth Champion ===
When Jackson Asiku chose to vacate his title Truscott found himself in line for a crack at the vacant commonwealth featherweight belt. Despite having never been more than 8 rounds before Truscott defeated tough Ghanaian Osumana Akaba over 12 to win the title. After the fight an emotional Truscott said “I can’t explain what it means...I’ve shoved all the setbacks I had as an amateur down everyone’s throats and proved them all wrong...And I’ve showed that you can achieve things when you come from Middlesbrough and be someone."

Truscott returned to the ring in October 2008 and met the Armenian fighter Alex Miskirtchian (13-1-1) in Burton. The fight was a non-title affair over 8 rounds and proved to be a good test for the fighter who took his record to 12-0 following another points victory. The first defence of his Commonwealth title came in January 2009 and ended in disappointment when losing to former British champion John Simpson. The fight having been halted in the 8th round when a clash of heads forced the referee to stop the fight on the advice of the ringside doctor, handing the title to the Scotsman. Truscott returned to the ring in June and won a six rounder against the Russian Andrey Kostin before on 4 September 2009 becoming the first defence of Simpson's newly won belt. It was to be another disappointing evening for Truscott when after receiving a standing count in the 9th round, the fight was stopped in the 10th handing another win to the Scot with both fighters having fought the bout at a furious tempo.

=== Comeback ===
Truscott returned to the ring on 7 May 2010 with a win over journeyman Mykyta Lukin at the Kingsway Leisure Centre in Widnes. The victory was followed up with two further wins in 2010 beating Zsolt Nagy in Wigan on 25 September and travelling to Ireland to beat Yordan Vasilev on 20 November. In his first fight of 2011 on 5 March Truscott traveled to Huddersfield and once again defeated the Hungarian journeyman Zsolt Nagy, winning on points over 6 rounds.

| Preceded by Jackson Asiku; Vacated | Commonwealth featherweight champion 9 May 2008 – 16 Jan 2009 | Succeeded by John Simpson |
