= Alex Miskirtchian =

Belgo-Armenian boxer

Personal information
- Nickname: Alex "Boum Boum" Miskirtchian
- Nationality: (Belgium) Belgian (Armenia) Armenian
- Born: Alexander Miskirtchian; 24 December 1985 (age 40) Tbilisi, Georgia
- Weight: Featherweight

Boxing career

Boxing record
- Total fights: 32
- Wins: 26
- Win by KO: 10
- Losses: 5
- Draws: 1
- No contests: 0

Alex Miskirtchian (born 24 December 1985) is an Armenian-Belgian professional boxer. He is the former EBU Featherweight Champion.

== Professional career ==
Miskirtchian won the EBU Featherweight title by defeating then EBU Featherweight Champion Sofiane Takoucht via decision on September 30, 2011.

== Professional boxing record ==
28 Wins (11 knockouts), 5 Losses, 1 Draw
Result	Record	Opponent	Type	Round	Date	Location	Notes
Win	28-5-1	(Democratic Republic of the Congo) Bilindo Eseko	UD	6 (6)	17/6/2017	(Democratic Republic of the Congo) Kinshasa, Congo	
Win	27-5-1	(Ghana) Kamarudeen Boyefio	KO	3 (8)	28/10/2016	(Democratic Republic of the Congo) Kinshasa, Congo	
Loss	26-5-1	(Romania) Viorel Simion	UD	12	18/03/2016	Bucharest, Romania	For vacant IBF Inter-Continental featherweight title.
Win	26-4-1	(Slovakia) Roman Rafael	TKO	2 (4)	13/02/2016	Sportova hala MSO, Štúrovo, Slovakia	
Loss	25-4-1	(United States) Cornelius Lock	TKO	3 (10)	25/08/2015	MCU Park, Brooklyn, New York, United States	
Win	25-3-1	(Nicaragua) Michael Escobar	UD	8	14/03/2015	Spiroudome Arena, Charleroi, Hainaut, Belgium	
Loss	24-3-1	(Russia) Evgeny Gradovich	UD	12	31/05/2014	Cotai Arena, Venetian Resort, Macau, China	For IBF featherweight title. Gradovich was down in 6th.
Win	24-2-1	(France) Sofiane Takoucht	MD	12	11/01/2014	Country Hall, Sart Tilman, Liege, Belgium	
Win	23-2-1	(Hungary) Andras Varga	KO	2 (8)	11/05/2013	Hall Octave Henry, Saint Servais, Namur, Belgium	
Win	22-2-1	(Norway) Andreas Evensen	TKO	12 (12)	09/02/2013	Blue Water Dokken, Saint Servais, Esbjerg, Denmark	Retained EBU (European) featherweight title.
Win	21-2-1	(France) Philippe Frenois	UD	12	28/04/2012	Spiroudome Arena, Charleroi, Hainaut, Belgium	Retained EBU (European) featherweight title.
Win	20-2-1	(France) Sofiane Takoucht	SD	12	30/09/2011	Spiroudome Arena, Charleville-Mézières, Ardennes, France	Won EBU (European) featherweight title.
Win	19-2-1	(Hungary) Ignac Kassai	TKO	4 (6)	19/03/2011	Salle des sports d'Anseremme, Anseremme, Namur, Belgium	
Win	18-2-1	(Thailand) Rachamongkol Sor Pleonchit	TKO	4 (12)	27/03/2010	Basket Club de Ciney, Ciney, Namur, Belgium	Won WBC International featherweight title.
Win	17-2-1	(France) Osman Aktas	UD	12	24/10/2009	Collège Notre-Dame de Bellevue, Dinant, Namur, Belgium	Won EBU-EU (European Union) featherweight title.
Win	16-2-1	(Morocco) Samir Boukrara	KO	3 (6)	01/05/2009	Hall Octave Henry, Namur, Namur, Belgium	
Win	15-2-1	(Spain) Ruddy Encarnacion	SD	10	11/04/2009	Salle de la Plante, Namur, Namur, Belgium	Won vacant Belgium featherweight title.
Win	14-2-1	(Czech Republic) Martin Holub	KO	1 (6)	22/02/2009	Éghezée, Namur, Belgium	
Loss	13-2-1	(United Kingdom) Paul Truscott	PTS	8	03/10/2008	Meadowside Leisure Centre, Burton-on-Trent, Staffordshire, United Kingdom	
Win	13-1-1	(Belgium) Lorenzo Ledesma	UD	4	24/05/2008	Hall Octave Henry, Namur, Namur, Belgium	
Win	12-1-1	(Slovakia) Elemir Rafael	TKO	5 (6)	26/04/2008	Montignies sur Sambre, Hainaut, Belgium	
Loss	11-1-1	(Italy) Antonio De Vitis	UD	12	28/02/2008	PalaFerrua, Savigliano, Piemonte, Italy	For vacant IBF International super featherweight title.
Win	11-0-1	(Belgium) Lorenzo Ledesma	UD	6	12/01/2008	Lotto Arena, Antwerpen, Antwerpen, Belgium	
Win	10-0-1	(Belgium) Pascal Bouchez	UD	6	17/11/2007	Complexe Sportif, Andenne, Luxembourg, Luxembourg, Belgium	
Win	9-0-1	(Belgium) Pascal Bouchez	TKO	5 (6)	09/06/2007	Antwerpen, Antwerpen, Belgium	Stopped when Bouchez was injured.
Win	8-0-1	(Czech Republic) Tomas Berki	TKO	1 (8)	15/04/2007	Montignies sur Sambre, Hainaut, Belgium	
Win	7-0-1	(France) Guillaume Tajan	PTS	6	10/02/2007	Casino Barriere, Dinant, Namur, Belgium	
Win	6-0-1	(Romania) Cristian Niculae	PTS	6	09/12/2006	Cuesmes, Hainaut, Belgium	
Win	5-0-1	(France) Faycal Messaoudene	UD	4	18/11/2006	Casino, Namur, Namur, Belgium	
Draw	4-0-1	(France) Mohamed Bouleghcha	PTS	4	29/04/2006	Chatelineau, Hainaut, Belgium	
Win	4–0	(France) Thomas Blondel	PTS	4	15/04/2006	Centre Culturel, Éghezée, Namur, Belgium	
Win	3–0	(Belgium) Miloud Saadi	PTS	6	28/01/2006	Salle Belle Vue, Dinant, Namur, Belgium	
Win	2–0	(Belgium) Lorenzo Ledesma	PTS	4	16/04/2005	Namur, Namur, Belgium	
Win	1–0	(Russia) Nikolai Volovoy	PTS	4	22/01/2005	Salle Belle Vue, Dinant, Namur, Belgium	
