= Martin Lindsay (boxer) =

Irish boxer (born 1982)

Personal information
- Nickname: Mac Man
- Born: 10 May 1982 (age 44) Belfast, Northern Ireland
- Weight: Featherweight

Boxing career
- Stance: Orthodox

Boxing record
- Total fights: 24
- Wins: 21
- Win by KO: 8
- Losses: 3

Martin Lindsay (born 10 May 1982) is a former professional boxer from Northern Ireland who competed from 2004 to 2014. He held the IBF Youth featherweight title in 2007. At regional level, he held the British featherweight title from 2009 to 2010 and challenged twice for the Commonwealth featherweight title between 2013 and 2014.

== Background ==
Lindsay was born in Belfast, Northern Ireland, and graduated from the University of Ulster with a Bachelor of Science degree in Business, Finance and Investment.

== Amateur career ==
At amateur level, Lindsay began boxing at the age of nine and was a stalwart of the Immaculata ABC in Belfast where he won 97 of 112 amateur bouts and was trained by Gerry "Nugget" Nugent.

He won eight All-Ireland titles at all levels including becoming the Irish senior featherweight champion in 2001 and 2004 as well as the Ulster championship in 2001 and 2002. Many of his fights were against fellow Belfast boxer, Brian Gillen, from the Holy Trinity club, with whom he developed a great rivalry.

In 2002, Lindsay represented Northern Ireland at the 2002 Commonwealth Games in Manchester, England and was defeated by England's Mark Moran in the second round.

Lindsay failed to qualify for the 2004 Summer Olympic in Athens after being beaten by Polish boxer Kryzysztov Szot 49–27 during an Olympic qualifier in Gothenburg, Sweden and then decided to turn professional.

== Professional career ==
=== Debut ===
Lindsay turned professional in December 2004 in Crystal Palace, London on an undercard of bill that included Carl Johanneson and Leva Kirakosyan. In his debut Lindsay defeated previously unbeaten Welshman Dai Davies with a first round knockout.

Lindsay followed this debut win up with six more wins in Ireland and the United Kingdom including a further two wins by knockout.

=== Move to Canada ===
In 2007, Lindsay then moved to Brampton, Ontario in Canada after he signed a three-year contract with Canadian promoters Orion Sports and the London-based former Immaculata boxer John Rooney Jnr.

=== IBF Youth Featherweight title ===
Following a win over Jose Silveira, Lindsay then fought for IBF Youth featherweight title. He challenged Mexican Uriel Barrera on 27 October 2007 for the title on a bill labelled the "Rumble at Rama II" at the Casino Rama, Rama, Ontario, Canada. It was the chief support on the undercard of the IBF super bantamweight title fight between stablemate Steve Molitor v. Fahsan 3K Battery.

Lindsay won the title on a shutout over ten rounds with a score of 100–90 on all three judges cards. Following the fight he stated "It felt brilliant when the referee put my hand up for the win, though it didn't really sink in at the time. It sunk in the next day when I felt all the pains all round my body.".

=== Celtic title and BBBofC British featherweight title ===
In February 2008, Lindsay had to postpone a combined Celtic title and British featherweight title eliminator fight against Scot Paul Appleby after he had to undergo dental surgery. However he put himself back in the mix in September 2008 when he found himself as the chief support on the first ever Hayemaker card in Sheffield. He boxed a final eliminator for the British title knocking out Liverpool fighter Derry Mathews in the 9th round. Following this the Appleby fight was rescheduled for March 2009 in Belfast, but after sustaining a rib injury in training Lindsay was forced to push back the fight. The fight eventually took place on 25 April 2009, at the Ulster Hall in Belfast, Northern Ireland, with Martin Lindsay capturing the title in front of his home crowd by stopping Paul Appleby in the 6th round. In his second defence of the British title, Lindsay lost out on a Unanimous Decision to John Simpson, giving lindsay his first loss and giving john simpson the British title.

=== Lindsay vs. Selby ===
Following his first loss to John Simpson, Lindsay has since bounced back with a 6-round points decision victory over Polish fighter Maurycy Gojko, a fourth-round TKO victory over Mickey Coveney, and an 8-round points decision victory over French lightweight Renald Garrido. On 9 February 2013, on the undercard of Carl Frampton vs. Kiko Martinez in the Odyssey Arena, Belfast, he will get his second BBBofC British Featherweight Title shot live on Sky Sports. He will be facing known Welsh fighter, Lee Selby on a card that will also include Ireland's Andy Lee facing Irishman Anthony "The Pride" Fitzgerald of Dublin in his first comeback fight since his loss to Julio Cesar Chavez Jr.

Lindsay has recently been training with ex Ulster and Gwent Dragons rugby player Jamie Smith.
