= Paul Appleby (boxer) =

Scottish boxer (born 1987)

Personal information
- Born: 22 July 1987 (age 38) Edinburgh, Scotland
- Height: 5 ft 9 in (175 cm)
- Weight: Featherweight, Super-featherweight

Boxing career
- Stance: Orthodox

Boxing record
- Total fights: 25
- Wins: 19
- Win by KO: 11
- Losses: 6

Paul Appleby (born 22 July 1987) is a Scottish former professional boxer. He held the British featherweight title from June 2008 to April 2009.

== Professional career ==
Appleby made his professional boxing debut on 23 January 2006 at the St. Andrew's Sporting Club in Glasgow, defeating Graeme Higginson when his opponent retired at the end of the third round.

After 11 straight wins, including eight stoppages, he beat reigning champion John Simpson on 6 June 2008 at the Kelvin Hall in Glasgow to claim the British featherweight title.

He successfully defended the title against Esham Pickering at Bellahouston Leisure Centre in Glasgow on 28 November 2008, winning by unanimous decision.

Appleby was named the 2008 Young Fighter of the Year by the Boxing Writers' Club.

On 25 April 2009, he lost his title against Martin Lindsay at the Ulster Hall in Belfast. The fight was stopped in round six after some heavy blows from Lindsay, although Appleby did not suffer a knockdown.

Appleby faced Joseph Laryea for the vacant WBO Intercontinental super-featherweight title at Braehead Arena in Glasgow on 4 December 2010. He lost the bout, which was also a final eliminator for a shot at the WBO title held by Ricky Burns, via split decision.

He challenged Commonwealth super-featherweight champion Liam Walsh at York Hall in London on 30 September 2011. Appleby knocked his opponent to the canvas in the seventh round, but was sent to the mat himself in round 10 and was retired by his corner before the start of the 11th round.

On 10 March 2012, Appleby won the vacant Celtic super-featherweight title with a unanimous decision success over Stephen Ormond at the Braehead Arena in Glasgow.

He lost the title in his first defense, a rematch from four years earlier against John Simpson, at Kelvin Hall in Glasgow on 29 June 2012, going down to a sixth round stoppage defeat.
