= GB Boxing =

British amateur boxing association

Great Britain Boxing
- Sport: Boxing
- Abbreviation: GB Boxing
- Headquarters: English Institute of Sport, Sheffield, United Kingdom

Official website
- www.gbboxing.org.uk
- (United Kingdom)

Great Britain Boxing is a team of elite amateur boxers from Great Britain, which is funded by the National Lottery and is based in the English Institute of Sport in Sheffield.

The Great British boxing team is split into two squads, the 'Podium' and 'Development', and the concept is that those of the 'Podium' are largely the current Olympians, the more experienced and accomplished of the elite of amateur boxing in Britain. Whereas the Development Squad focuses on developing the future generation of boxers for the 2020 Tokyo Olympics and beyond. The British Boxing team has emerged as a 'force' in the amateur boxing game in recent years. The programme is supported by a team of world-class nutritionists, physiotherapists, psychologists, as well as a partnership with Soulmate Food.

In 2009, Natasha Jonas became the first female boxer to compete for GB Boxing.

== Training base ==
The GB Boxing Team are based at the English Institute of Sport in Sheffield, where they have a state-of-the-art, purpose-built boxing gymnasium which opened in 2009.

== Olympic Games ==
=== 1948 London Olympics ===
Date: 1948

Location: (United Kingdom) London, Great Britain

Participants: 8

Medal Haul: 0 G, 2 S, 0 B

Boxers:

Boxer	Nationality	Weight	Result
Peter Brander	(England) ENG	Featherweight	ROUND OF 32
Henry Carpenter	(England) ENG	Flyweight	ROUND OF 16
Ron Cooper	(England) ENG	Lightweight	ROUND OF 16
Jack Gardner	England	Heavyweight	ROUND OF 16
Tommy Proffitt	(England) ENG	Bantamweight	ROUND OF 32
Don Scott	(England) ENG	Light Heavyweight	SILVER
Max Shacklady	(England) GBR	Welterweight	ROUND OF 16
Johnny Wright	(England) ENG	Middleweight	SILVER

Coaches:

=== 1952 Helsinki Olympics ===
Date: 1952

Location: Helsinki, Finland

Participants: 10

Medal Haul: 0 G, 0 S, 0 B

Boxers:

Boxer	Nationality	Weight	Result
Henry Cooper	(England) ENG	Light Heavyweight	ROUND OF 16
Dai Dower	(Wales) WAL	Flyweight	ROUND OF 16
Bernard Foster	(England) ENG	Light Middleweight	ROUND OF 32
Terence Gooding	(England) ENG	Middleweight	ROUND OF 16
Edgar William Hearn	(England) ENG	Heavyweight	QUARTER-FINAL
Percival Lewis	(England) ENG	Featherweight	ROUND OF 32
John Patrick Maloney	(England) ENG	Welterweight	ROUND OF 32
Thomas Nicholls	(England) ENG	Bantamweight	ROUND OF 32
Frederick Reardon	(England) ENG	Lightweight	QUARTER-FINAL
Peter Waterman	(England) ENG	Light Welterweight	ROUND OF 16

Coaches:

=== 1956 Melbourne Olympics ===
Date: 1956

Location: Melbourne, Australia

Participants: 7

Medal Haul: 2 G, 1 S, 2 B

Boxers:

Boxer	Nationality	Weight	Result
Nicholas Gargano	(England) ENG	Welterweight	BRONZE
John McCormack	(Scotland) SCO	Light Middleweight	BRONZE
Richard McTaggart	(Scotland) SCO	Lightweight	GOLD
Thomas Nicholls	(England) ENG	Featherweight	SILVER
Ronald Redrup	(England) ENG	Middleweight	ROUND OF 16
Owen Reilly	(Scotland) SCO	Bantamweight	QUARTER-FINAL
Terence Spinks	(England) ENG	Flyweight	GOLD

Coaches:

=== 1960 Rome Olympics ===
Date: 1960

Location: Rome, Italy

Participants: 5

Medal Haul: 0 G, 0 S, 3 B

Boxers:

Boxer	Nationality	Weight	Result
Thomas Dave	(England) ENG	Heavyweight	QUARTER-FINAL
William Fisher	(Scotland) SCO	Light Middleweight	BRONZE
Jimmy Lloyd	(England) ENG	Welterweight	BRONZE
Richard McTaggart	(Scotland) SCO	Lightweight	BRONZE
Johnny Ould	(England) ENG	Light Heavyweight	ROUND OF 32

Coaches:

=== 1964 Tokyo Olympics ===
Date: 1964

Location: Tokyo, Japan

Participants: 8

Medal Haul: 0 G, 0 S, 0 B

Boxers:

Boxer	Nationality	Weight	Result
Jimmy Dunne	(England) ENG	Lightweight	ROUND OF 16
John McCluskey	(Scotland) SCO	Flyweight	ROUND OF 16
Richard McTaggart	(Scotland) SCO	Light Welterweight	ROUND OF 16
Brian Packer	(England) ENG	Bantamweight	ROUND OF 32
William Robinson	(England) ENG	Light Middleweight	ROUND OF 16
Ronald Smith	(England) ENG	Featherweight	ROUND OF 32
William Stack	(England) ENG	Middleweight	ROUND OF 16
Michael Varley	(England) ENG	Welterweight	QUARTER-FINAL

Coaches:

=== 1968 Mexico City Olympics ===
Date: 1968

Location: Mexico City, Mexico

Participants: 2

Medal Haul: 1 G, 0 S, 0 B

Boxers:

Boxer	Nationality	Weight	Result
Eric Blake	(England) ENG	Light Middleweight	QUARTER-FINAL
Chris Finnegan	(England) ENG	Middleweight	GOLD

Coaches:

=== 1972 Munich Olympics ===
Date: 1972

Location: Munich, West Germany

Participants: 8

Medal Haul: 0 G, 0 S, 3 B

'Boxers:

Boxer	Nationality	Weight	Result
Neville Cole	(England) ENG	Lightweight	ROUND OF 32
Ralph Evans	(Wales) WAL	Light Flyweight	BRONZE
Maurice Hope	(England) ENG	Welterweight	QUARTER-FINAL
William Knight	(England) ENG	Middleweight	ROUND OF 16
Alan Minter	(England) ENG	Light Middleweight	BRONZE
Maurice O'Sullivan	(England) ENG	Flyweight	ROUND OF 32
William Taylor	(England) ENG	Featherweight	ROUND OF 32
George Turpin	(England) ENG	Bantamweight	BRONZE

Coaches:

=== 1976 Montreal Olympics ===
Date: 1976

Location: Montreal, Canada

Participants: 6

Medal Haul: 0 G, 0 S, 1 B

Boxers:

Boxer	Nationality	Weight	Result
Patrick Cowdell	(England) ENG	Bantamweight	BRONZE
Robert Davies	(England) ENG	Light Middleweight	ROUND OF 16
Colin Jones	(Wales) WAL	Welterweight	ROUND OF 16
Charlie Magri	(England) ENG	Flyweight	ROUND OF 16
Clinton McKenzie	(England) ENG	Light Welterweight	ROUND OF 16
David Odwell	(England) ENG	Middleweight	ROUND OF 16

Coaches:

=== 1980 Moscow Olympics ===
Date: 1980

Location: Moscow, Soviet Union

Participants: 9

Medal Haul: 0 G, 0 S, 1 B

Boxers:

Boxer	Nationality	Weight	Result
Joseph Frost	(England) ENG	Welterweight	QUARTER-FINAL
George Gilbody	(England) ENG	Lightweight	QUARTER-FINAL
Raymond Gilbody	(England) ENG	Bantamweight	ROUND OF 16
Peter Hanlon	(England) ENG	Featherweight	ROUND OF 16
Gerard Hawkins	(England) ENG	Light Flyweight	ROUND OF 16
Mark Kaylor	(England) ENG	Middleweight	QUARTER-FINAL
Keith Wallace	(England) ENG	Flyweight	ROUND OF 16
Tony Willis	(England) ENG	Light Welterweight	BRONZE
Nick Wilshire	(England) ENG	Light Middleweight	QUARTER-FINAL

Coaches:

=== 1984 Los Angeles Olympics ===
Date: 1984

Location: Los Angeles, United States

Participants: 11

Medal Haul: 0 G, 0 S, 1 B

Boxers:

Boxer	Nationality	Weight	Result
Pat Clinton	(Scotland) SCO	Flyweight	ROUND OF 16
Ricky Coleman	(England) ENG	Light Flyweight	QUARTER-FINAL
Rod Douglas	(England) ENG	Light Middleweight	QUARTER-FINAL
Alex Dickson	(Scotland) SCO	Lightweight	ROUND OF 16
David Griffiths	(England) ENG	Light Welterweight	ROUND OF 16
Michael Hughes	(England) ENG	Welterweight	ROUND OF 32
John Hyland	(England) ENG	Bantamweight	ROUND OF 32
Brian Schumacher	(England) ENG	Middleweight	ROUND OF 32
Kevin Taylor	(England) ENG	Featherweight	ROUND OF 16
Robert Wells	(England) ENG	Super Heavyweight	BRONZE
Anthony Wilson	(England) ENG	Light Heavyweight	QUARTER-FINAL

=== 1988 Seoul Olympics ===
Date: 1988

Location: Seoul, South Korea

Participants: 8

Medal Haul: 0 G, 0 S, 1 B

Boxers:

Boxer	Nationality	Weight	Result
Henry Akinwande	(England) ENG	Super Heavyweight	ROUND OF 16
David Anderson	(England) ENG	Featherweight	ROUND OF 16
Michael Devanney	(England) ENG	Bantamweight	ROUND OF 32
Mark Elliott	(England) ENG	Light Welterweight	ROUND OF 32
Mark Epton	(England) ENG	Light Flyweight	ROUND OF 32
Charles Kane	(England) ENG	Lightweight	QUARTER-FINAL
John Lyon	(England) ENG	Flyweight	ROUND OF 32
Richie Woodhall	(England) ENG	Light Middleweight	BRONZE

Coaches:

=== 1992 Barcelona Olympics ===
Date: 1992

Location: Barcelona, Spain

Participants: 7

Medal Haul: 0 G, 0 S, 1 B

Boxers:

Boxer	Nationality	Weight	Result
Brian Carr	(Scotland) SCO	Featherweight	ROUND OF 32
Robert Clarke	(England) ENG	Lightweight	ROUND OF 32
Adrian Dodson	(England) ENG	Welterweight	ROUND OF 16
Paul Ingle	(England) ENG	Flyweight	ROUND OF 16
Paul Lawson	(England) ENG	Heavyweight	ROUND OF 32
Robin Reid	(England) ENG	Light Middleweight	BRONZE
Rowan Williams	(England) ENG	Light Flyweight	QUARTER-FINAL

=== 1996 Atlanta Olympics ===
Date: 1996

Location: Atlanta, United States

Participants: 2

Medal Haul: 0 G, 0 S, 0 B

Boxers:

Boxer	Nationality	Weight	Result
David Burke	(England) ENG	Featherweight	ROUND OF 32
Fola Okesola	(England) ENG	Heavyweight	ROUND OF 32

Coaches:

=== 2000 Sydney Olympics ===
Date: 2000

Location: Sydney, Australia

Participants: 2

Medal Haul: 1 G, 0 S, 0 B

Boxers:

Boxer	Nationality	Weight	Result
Courtney Fry	(England) ENG	Light Heavyweight	ROUND OF 32
Audley Harrison	(England) ENG	Super Heavyweight	GOLD

Coaches:

- (England) Ian Irwin
- (England) Kelvyn Travis

=== 2004 Athens Olympics ===
Date: 2004

Location: Athens, Greece

Participants: 1

Medal Haul: 0 G, 1 S, 0 B

Boxers:

Boxer	Nationality	Weight	Result
Amir Khan	(England) ENG	Lightweight	SILVER

Coaches:

- (England) Terry Edwards

=== 2008 Beijing Olympics ===
Date: 2008

Location: Beijing, China

Participants: 8

Medal Haul: 1 G, 0 S, 2 B

Boxers:

Boxer	Nationality	Weight	Result
James DeGale	(England) ENG	Middleweight	GOLD
Frankie Gavin	(England) ENG	Lightweight	WITHDREW
Tony Jeffries	(England) ENG	Light Heavyweight	BRONZE
Joe Murray	(England) ENG	Bantamweight	ROUND OF 32
David Price (c)	(England) ENG	Super Heavyweight	BRONZE
Billy Joe Saunders	(England) ENG	Welterweight	ROUND OF 16
Bradley Saunders	(England) ENG	Light Welterweight	ROUND OF 16
Khalid Yafai	(England) ENG	Flyweight	ROUND OF 16

Coaches:

- (Wales) Nigel Davies
- (England) Terry Edwards
- (England) Dave Pocknall

=== 2012 London Olympics ===
Date: 2012

Location: (United Kingdom) London, Great Britain

Participants: 10

Medal Haul: 3 G, 1 S, 1 B

Boxers:

Boxer	Nationality	Weight	Result
Nicola Adams	(England) ENG	Flyweight	GOLD
Luke Campbell	(England) ENG	Bantamweight	GOLD
Fred Evans	(Wales) WAL	Welterweight	SILVER
Natasha Jonas	(England) ENG	Lightweight	QUARTER-FINAL
Anthony Joshua	(England) ENG	Super Heavyweight	GOLD
Savannah Marshall	(England) ENG	Middleweight	QUARTER-FINAL
Anthony Ogogo	(England) ENG	Middleweight	BRONZE
Andrew Selby	(Wales) WAL	Flyweight	QUARTER-FINAL
Tom Stalker (c)	(England) ENG	Light Welterweight	QUARTER-FINAL
Josh Taylor	(Scotland) SCO	Lightweight	ROUND OF 16

Coaches:

- (England) Dave Alloway
- (England) Lee Pullen
- (England) Paul Walmsley

=== 2016 Rio Olympics ===
Date: 2016

Location: Rio de Janeiro, Brazil

Participants: 9

Medal Haul:

Boxers:

Boxer	Nationality	Weight	Result
Galal Yafai	(England) ENG	Light Flyweight	
Muhammad Ali	(England) ENG	Flyweight	
Qais Ashfaq	(England) ENG	Bantamweight	
Joseph Cordina	(Wales) WAL	Lightweight	
Josh Kelly	(England) ENG	Welterweight	
Antony Fowler	(England) ENG	Middleweight	
Joshua Buatsi	(England) ENG	Light Heavyweight	Bronze
Lawrence Okolie	(England) ENG	Heavyweight	
Joe Joyce	(England) ENG	Super Heavyweight	Silver
Nicola Adams	(England) ENG	Flyweight	Gold

Coaches:

- (England) Dave Alloway
- (England) Lee Pullen
- (England) Paul Walmsley

== World Championships ==
=== 1974 World Amateur Boxing Championships ===
Date: 1974

Location: Havana, Cuba

Participants:

Medal Haul: 0 G, 0 S, 0 B

Boxers:

'Coaches:

=== 1978 World Amateur Boxing Championships ===
Date: 1978

Location: (Socialist Federal Republic of Yugoslavia) Belgrade, Yugoslavia

Participants:

Medal Haul: 0 G, 0 S, 0 B

Boxers:

'Coaches:

=== 1982 World Amateur Boxing Championships ===
Date: 1982

Location: Munich, West Germany

Participants:

Medal Haul: 0 G, 0 S, 0 B

Boxers:

'Coaches:

=== 1986 World Amateur Boxing Championships ===
Date: 1986

Location: Reno, United States

Participants:

Medal Haul: 0 G, 0 S, 0 B

Boxers:

'Coaches:

=== 1989 World Amateur Boxing Championships ===
Date: 1989

Location: Moscow, Soviet Union

Participants:

Medal Haul: 0 G, 0 S, 0 B

Boxers:

'Coaches:

=== 1991 World Amateur Boxing Championships ===
Date: 1991

Location: Sydney, Australia

Participants:

Medal Haul: 0 G, 0 S, 0 B

Boxers:

'Coaches:

=== 1993 World Amateur Boxing Championships ===
Date: 1993

Location: Tampere, Finland

Participants:

Medal Haul: 0 G, 0 S, 0 B

Boxers:

'Coaches:

=== 1995 World Amateur Boxing Championships ===
Date: 1995

Location: Berlin, Germany

Participants:

Medal Haul: 0 G, 0 S, 0 B

Boxers:

'Coaches:

=== 1997 World Amateur Boxing Championships ===
Date: 1997

Location: Budapest, Hungary

Participants:

Medal Haul: 0 G, 0 S, 0 B

Boxers:

'Coaches:

=== 1999 World Amateur Boxing Championships ===
Date: 1999

Location: Houston, United States

Participants:

Medal Haul: 0 G, 0 S, 1 B

Boxers:

Boxer	Nationality	Weight	Result
Keith Evans	(Wales) WAL	Heavyweight	BRONZE

'Coaches:

=== 2001 World Amateur Boxing Championships ===
Date: 2001

Location: Belfast, Northern Ireland

Participants:

Medal Haul: 0 G, 1 S, 1 B

Boxers:

Boxer	Nationality	Weight	Result
Carl Froch	(England) ENG	Middleweight	BRONZE
David Haye	(England) ENG	Heavyweight	SILVER

Coaches:

=== 2003 World Amateur Boxing Championships ===
Date: 2003

Location: Bangkok, Thailand

Participants:

Medal Haul: 0 G, 0 S, 0 B

Boxers:

Coaches:

=== 2005 World Amateur Boxing Championships ===
Date: 2005

Location: Mianyang, China

Participants:

Medal Haul: 0 G, 0 S, 1 B

Boxers:

Boxer	Nationality	Weight	Result
Neil Perkins	(England) ENG	Welterweight	BRONZE

Coaches:

=== 2007 World Amateur Boxing Championships ===
Date: 2007

Location: Chicago, United States

Participants:

Medal Haul: 1 G, 0 S, 2 B

Boxers:

Boxer	Nationality	Weight	Result
Frankie Gavin	(England) ENG	Lightweight	GOLD
Joe Murray	(England) ENG	Bantamweight	BRONZE
Bradley Saunders	(England) ENG	Light Welterweight	BRONZE

Coaches:

=== 2009 World Amateur Boxing Championships ===
Date: 2009

Location: Milan, Italy

Participants:

Medal Haul: 0 G, 0 S, 0 B

Boxers:

Coaches:

=== 2011 World Amateur Boxing Championships ===
Date: 2011

Location: Baku, Azerbaijan

Participants: 13

Medal Haul: 0 G, 3 S, 1 B

Boxers:

Boxer	Nationality	Weight	Result
Luke Campbell	(England) ENG	Bantamweight	SILVER
Scott Cardle	(England) ENG	Welterweight	ROUND OF 64
Joe Cordina	(Wales) WAL	Lightweight	ROUND OF 64
Charlie Edwards	(England) ENG	Light Flyweight	ROUND OF 64
Anthony Joshua	(England) ENG	Super Heavyweight	SILVER
Fred Evans	(Wales) WAL	Welterweight	QUARTER-FINAL
Sean McGoldrick	(Wales) WAL	Bantamweight	ROUND OF 64
Anthony Ogogo	(England) ENG	Middleweight	ROUND OF 16
Andrew Selby	(Wales) WAL	Flyweight	SILVER
Tom Stalker	(England) ENG	Light Welterweight	BRONZE
Josh Taylor	(Scotland) SCO	Light Welterweight	ROUND OF 64
Martin J Ward	(England) ENG	Lightweight	ROUND OF 32
Khalid Yafai	(England) ENG	Flyweight	QUARTER-FINAL

Coaches:

=== 2013 World Amateur Boxing Championships ===
Date: 2013

Location: Almaty, Kazakhstan

Participants: 13

Medal Haul:

Boxers:

Boxer	Nationality	Weight	Result
Jack Bateson	(England) ENG	Light Flyweight	ROUND OF 32
Warren Baister	(England) ENG	Heavyweight	ROUND OF 64
Aston Brown	(Scotland) SCO	Middleweight	ROUND OF 16
Joe Cordina	(Wales) WAL	Lightweight	ROUND OF 32
Charlie Edwards	(England) ENG	Flyweight	ROUND OF 32
Fred Evans	(Wales) WAL	Welterweight	QUARTER-FINAL
Anthony Fowler	(England) ENG	Middleweight	BRONZE
Joe Joyce	(England) ENG	Super Heavyweight	ROUND OF 32
Sam Maxwell	(England) ENG	Light Welterweight	ROUND OF 64
Sean McGoldrick	(Wales) WAL	Bantamweight	ROUND OF 64
Andrew Selby	(Wales) WAL	Flyweight	
Josh Taylor	(Scotland) SCO	Light Welterweight	ROUND OF 32
Gamal Yafai	(England) ENG	Bantamweight	ROUND OF 64

Coaches:

Tony Davis

== European Championships ==
=== 2011 European Amateur Boxing Championships ===
Date: 2011

Location: Ankara, Turkey

Participants:

Medal Haul:

Boxers:

Boxer	Nationality	Weight	Result
Aston Brown	(Scotland) SCO	Middleweight	
Luke Campbell	(England) ENG	Bantamweight	
Scott Cardle	(England) ENG	Welterweight	
Charlie Edwards	(England) ENG	Light Flyweight	BRONZE
Fred Evans	(Wales) WAL	Welterweight	
Anthony Joshua	(England) ENG	Super Heavyweight	
Obed Mbwakongo	(England) ENG	Light Heavyweight	
Sean McGoldrick	(Wales) WAL	Bantamweight	
Anthony Ogogo	(England) ENG	Middleweight	
Danny Price	(England) ENG	Heavyweight	
Andrew Selby	(Wales) WAL	Flyweight	GOLD
Tom Stalker	(England) ENG	Light Welterweight	SILVER
Josh Taylor	(Scotland) SCO	Lightweight	
Martin J Ward	(England) ENG	Lightweight	
Khalid Yafai	(England) ENG	Flyweight	

Coaches:

== British Lionhearts ==
The British Lionhearts represent Great Britain in the World Series of Boxing. Founded in 2012, the Lionhearts competed in the 2012–13 season of WSB, reaching the quarter-finals where they were defeated by Mexico Guerreros. However, they didn't enter in the following season.

== Current squad ==
Men:

49 kg (England) Galal Yafai

52 kg (England) Will Cawley

52 kg (England) Kiaran MacDonald

56 kg (England) Niall Farrell

56 kg (England) Peter McGrail

60 kg (England) Calum French

64 kg (England) Luke McCormack

64 kg (Wales) Mickey McDonagh

69 kg (England) Pat McCormack

69 kg (England) Cyrus Pattinson

69 kg (England) Harris Akbar

75 kg (England) Mark Dickinson

81 kg (Wales) Sammy Lee

91 kg (England) Cheavon Clarke

91 kg (England) Lewis Williams

91 kg (Scotland) Scott Forrest

91+kg (England) Solomon Dacres

91+kg (England) Frazer Clarke

Women:

52 kg (England) Ebonie Jones

60 kg (England) Paige Murney

60 kg (England) Sandy Ryan

64 kg (Wales) Rosie Eccles

75 kg (England) Natasha Gale

75 kg (Wales) Lauren Price
