= Derry Mathews =

British boxer (born 1983)

Personal information
- Nationality: English
- Born: 23 September 1983 (age 43) Liverpool, England
- Height: 5 ft 8 1/2 in (174 cm)
- Weight: Featherweight; Lightweight; Light welterweight

Boxing career
- Reach: 68 in (173 cm)
- Stance: Orthodox

Boxing record
- Total fights: 52
- Wins: 38
- Win by KO: 20
- Losses: 12
- Draws: 2

Derry Mathews (born 23 September 1983) is a British former professional boxer who competed from 2003 to 2017. He held the WBA interim lightweight title in 2015 and has challenged, twice, for lightweight world championships, the WBO title in 2016, and the vacant IBO title in 2012. At regional level, he held the British lightweight title twice between 2012 and 2014, the Commonwealth lightweight title in 2013, and challenged, twice, for the EBU European lightweight title between 2011 and 2012.

== Amateur career ==
Mathews won the 2002 Amateur Boxing Association British bantamweight title, when boxing out of the Salisbury ABC.

== Professional career ==
Mathews shot to notice in October 2006 when he defeated Stephen Foster to win the WBU featherweight title which announced Mathews onto the domestic scene. Successful defences of the title followed against John Simpson and Matthew Marsh before running into the Mongolian Choi Tseveenpurev in Bolton on 5 April 2008. Mathews hit the deck three times before finally being hit with a body shot that ended the fight on the bell to end the fifth round. After the defeat to Tseveenpurev, Mathews came back to beat the Kenyan, John Gircharu over eight rounds in his home city of Liverpool showing that the defeat had not destroyed his confidence.

=== Signing for Hayemaker ===
In August 2008, Mathews decided to split from the Frank Warren boxing stable and took the decision to join the newly formed Hayemaker Promotions. On speaking about the deal Mathews said; "The deal is unbelievable and Hayemaker Promotions are going to bring big things for me" He was knocked out in the 9th round of his first fight with the fledgling promotional outfit. The fight against Martin Lindsay was on the undercard to Ryan Rhodes defence of his British light-middleweight title. Mathews had put Lindsay down in the 2nd round and was ahead on points, until a knockout brought any aspirations that Mathews may have had of fighting for the British title down. Mathews second fight with Hayemaker in March 2009 took place in his home town of Liverpool. It also ended in disappointment as he suffered a stoppage defeat to Harry Ramogoadi. Following the collapse of Setanta Sports and the loss of Hayemakers television deal, Mathews split from the promoter saying "It’s a shame but after the TV went the shows dried up. I have left on good terms though and have no issues with anybody at Hayemaker, but I have to look after my own career."

=== Hatton Promotions ===
Mathews signed for Hatton Promotions following the collapse of his deal with Hayemaker, making his debut on 13 November 2009. Fighting in Stoke on the Matthew Hatton versus Lovemore N'dou undercard, Mathews challenged local man Scott Lawton only to lose in the sixth round after the referee deemed Mathews unfit to continue. The defeat to Lawton represented Mathew's fourth defeat in five matches. On 17 July 2010 he returned to winning ways defeating journeyman Kristian Laight at the Fit City in Salford and followed the victory up with another win over Daniel Thorpe at the same venue on 25 September 2010.

=== Prizefighter tournament ===
On 20 November 2010 Mathews entered the super featherweight installment of the Prizefighter series saying that he wanted to make the most of the opportunity. Amongst the other contestants in the tournament were two fighters he had previously lost to in Scott Lawton and Choi Tseveenpurev with Mathews saying "I want Choi up first to prove to myself and to other people that I can beat him. When I lost my world title to him I was only 22, I was only a boy, but I’m now a man and have learnt the hard way coming off a few defeats." In the draw for the tournament Mathews took on Gary McArthur in the quarter-finals, stopping him in the third round before meeting Choi in the semi-final with Mathews gaining a revenge victory in a close fought fight. Reaching the final Mathews met Gary Buckland only to lose with a second round stoppage. Speaking following the tournament Mathews described his performance against Choi as a "real war" and said of his opponent in the final, "Gary is a deserved winner but after how I performed tonight, I know I have more to offer the game."

=== Comeback ===
On 22 January 2011 Mathews made a comeback under the guidance of Liverpool Boxing Promoter Stephen Vaughan Jnr and challenged Scott Lawton once more, this time at the Olympia in Liverpool gaining a revenge win over the man from Stoke to lift the IBO International title at lightweight. Winning on all three of the judges scorecards, the fight went the full 12 rounds with Mathews dominating the first 8 rounds only for Lawton to come back into the fight towards the end culminating in a final round tear up. Mathews followed the win up with a challenge for the English lightweight title beating Amir Unsworth with a 1st round stoppage again at the Olympia on 2 April 2011. Two more stoppage victories following against George Watson and Stephen Jennings. The latter for the British Masters lightweight title. He then challenged Gavin Rees for the European Boxing Union European Title which ended in a draw because of a head collision. On 20 January 2012, almost a year on from his comeback, he challenged Emiliano Marsili for the vacant IBO World lightweight title. The fight with Marsili ended in round 7 with Mathews being stopped on his feet. He then challenged then British champion Anthony Crolla on 21 April 2012 and won with a sixth round stoppage winning the British title for the first time in his career. After this impressive win to capture the British Title he challenged Gavin Rees again for the EBU European title on 7 July 2012 which ended in a ninth round stoppage in favor of Rees. After this he left Stephen Vaughan Jnr entered prizefighter for the second time which ended in a semi-final defeat to Terry Flanagan and signed a Promotional deal with Dave Coldwell.

A win on a Coldwell promotion on 7 December 2012 against journeyman Asan Yuseinov set up a return match up with Anthony Crolla for the vacant Commonwealth lightweight title in Liverpool Echo Arena on 30 March 2013 which ended in a draw although most seen Crolla as the winner. After this on 13 July 2013 he won the vacant Commonwealth title with a KO of Tommy Coyle in the 10th round outdoors at Craven Park Stadium Hull.

Mathews subsequently defeated Curtis Woodhouse by way of a third round ok to retain his Commonwealth title in Liverpool Olympia on 21 September 2013. In October 2013 he announced a split from Dave Coldwell and signed an agreement with Frank Warren to box on his BoxNation Channel. In his 1st fight back under the Warren banner he was out pointed easily by Irishman Stephen Ormond for the WBO European title on 7 December 2013.

On 10 May 2014 he won the British lightweight title for the second time by out pointing Martin Gethin over 12 Rounds at the Liverpool Olympia. He subsequently relinquished the title.

On 18 April 2015, Mathews won the WBA interim lightweight title by defeating Tony Luiz via unanimous decision at the Echo Arena in Liverpool.

Mathews managed to secure a shot at the WBO lightweight title on 12 March 2016, fighting Terry Flanagan for the title. Mathews lost the fight convincingly, via unanimous decision, as Flanagan defended his belt successfully for the second time in a row.

In his next fight, Mathews faced British Olympian Luke Campbell. Campbell managed to land numerous body shots on Mathews, which culminated in a fourth-round knockout for Campbell.

On 5 March 2017 he announced his retirement from boxing following a 3rd round stoppage against Ohara Davies the night before.

== Professional boxing record ==
52 fights	38 wins	12 losses
By knockout	20	9
By decision	18	3
Draws	2	

No.	Result	Record	Opponent	Type	Round, time	Date	Location	Notes
52	Loss	38-12-2	Ohara Davies	TKO	3 (12)	4 Mar 2017	The O2 Arena, London, England	For WBC Silver super lightweight title
51	Loss	38-11-2	Luke Campbell	KO	4 (12)	15 Oct 2016	Echo Arena, Liverpool, England	For WBC Silver and Commonwealth lightweight titles
50	Loss	38-10-2	Terry Flanagan	UD	12	12 Mar 2016	Echo Arena, Liverpool, England	For WBO lightweight title
49	Win	38-9-2	Tony Luis	UD	12	18 Apr 2015	Echo Arena, Liverpool, England	Won WBA interim lightweight title
48	Win	37-9-2	Gyorgy Mizsei Jr	TKO	5 (8)	6 Mar 2015	Echo Arena, Liverpool, England	
47	Win	36-9-2	Adam Dingsdale	UD	12	25 Oct 2014	Echo Arena, Liverpool, England	Won vacant WBA Continental lightweight title
46	Win	35-9-2	Martin Gethin	SD	12	10 May 2014	Liverpool Olympia, Liverpool, England	Won British lightweight title
45	Loss	34-9-2	Stephen Ormond	UD	10	7 Dec 2013	Echo Arena, Liverpool, England	For WBO European lightweight title
44	Win	34-8-2	Curtis Woodhouse	TKO	4 (12)	21 Sep 2013	Liverpool Olympia, Liverpool, England	Retained Commonwealth lightweight title
43	Win	33-8-2	Tommy Coyle	KO	10 (12)	13 Jul 2013	Craven Park, Hull, England	Won vacant Commonwealth lightweight title
42	Draw	32-8-2	Anthony Crolla	SD	12	30 Mar 2013	Echo Arena, Liverpool, England	For vacant Commonwealth lightweight title
41	Win	32-8-1	Asan Yuseinov	KO	1 (8)	7 Dec 2012	Bowler's Arena, Manchester, England	
40	Loss	31-8-1	Terry Flanagan	UD	3	6 Oct 2012	Liverpool Olympia, Liverpool, England	Prizefighter: The Lightweights II - Semi-Final
39	Win	31-7-1	Jamie Spence	UD	3	6 Oct 2012	Liverpool Olympia, Liverpool, England	Prizefighter: The Lightweights II - Quarter-Final
38	Loss	30-7-1	Gavin Rees	TKO	9 (12)	7 Jul 2012	Motorpoint Arena, Sheffield, England	For British and EBU European lightweight titles
37	Win	30-6-1	Anthony Crolla	TKO	6 (12)	21 Apr 2012	Oldham Sports Centre, Oldham, England	Won British lightweight title
36	Loss	29-6-1	Emiliano Marsili	TKO	7 (12)	20 Jan 2012	Liverpool Olympia, Liverpool, England	For IBO lightweight title
35	Draw	29-5-1	Gavin Rees	TD	4 (12)	1 Oct 2011	Newport Leisure Centre, Newport, Wales	For EBU European lightweight title
34	Win	29-5	Stephen Jennings	TKO	6 (10)	30 Jul 2011	Greenbank Sports Centre, Liverpool, England	Won British Masters lightweight title
33	Win	28-5	George Watson	KO	1 (8)	11 Jun 2011	Liverpool Olympia, Liverpool, England	
32	Win	27-5	Amir Unsworth	TKO	1 (10)	2 Apr 2011	Liverpool Olympia, Liverpool, England	Won English lightweight title
31	Win	26-5	Scott Lawton	UD	12	22 Jan 2011	Liverpool Olympia, Liverpool, England	Won IBO International lightweight title
30	Loss	25-5	Gary Buckland	KO	2 (3)	20 Nov 2010	York Hall, London, England	Prizefighter: The Super Featherweights - Final
29	Win	25-4	Choi Tseveenpurev	UD	3	20 Nov 2010	York Hall, London, England	Prizefighter: The Super Featherweights - Semi-Final
28	Win	24-4	Gary McArthur	TKO	3 (3)	20 Nov 2010	York Hall, London, England	Prizefighter: The Super Featherweights - Quarter-Final
27	Win	23-4	Daniel Thorpe	PTS	6	25 Sep 2010	Fit City, Salford, England	
26	Win	22-4	Kristian Laight	PTS	4	17 Oct 2010	Fit City, Salford, England	
25	Loss	21-4	Scott Lawton	TKO	6 (8)	13 Nov 2009	Fenton Manor Sports Complex, Stoke-on-Trent, England	
24	Loss	21-3	Harry Ramogoadi	KO	4 (6)	28 Mar 2009	Echo Arena, Liverpool, England	For British Masters lightweight title
23	Loss	21-2	Martin Lindsay	KO	9 (10)	20 Sep 2008	Hillsborough Leisure Centre, Sheffield, England	
22	Win	21-1	John Gicharu	PTS	8	19 Jul 2008	Greenbank Sports Centre, Liverpool, England	Won British Masters lightweight title
21	Loss	20-1	Choi Tseveenpurev	KO	5 (12)	5 Apr 2008	USN Bolton Arena, Bolton, England	For WBU featherweight title
20	Win	20-0	Nikoloz Berkatsashvili	KO	1 (8)	2 Feb 2008	ExCel Arena, London, England	
19	Win	19-0	Matthew Marsh	TKO	11 (12)	13 Oct 2007	York Hall, London, England	Retained WBU featherweight title
18	Win	18-0	John Simpson	UD	12	10 Mar 2007	Liverpool Olympia, Liverpool, England	Retained WBU featherweight title
17	Win	17-0	Stephen Foster	UD	12	14 Oct 2006	Manchester Arena, Manchester, England	Won WBU featherweight title
16	Win	16-0	Mickey Coveney	PTS	8	1 Jun 2006	Metrodome, Barnsley, England	
15	Win	15-0	Steve Chinnock	RTD	6 (10)	28 Jan 2006	Nottingham Arena, Nottingham, England	Won English featherweight title
14	Win	14-0	Frederic Bonifai	PTS	6	25 Oct 2005	Guild Hall, Preston, England	
13	Win	13-0	Dai Davies	TKO	2 (6)	16 Jul 2005	USN Bolton Arena, Bolton, England	
12	Win	12-0	John Mackay	PTS	6	13 May 2005	Everton Park Sports Centre, Liverpool, England	
11	Win	11-0	Dean Ward	TKO	1 (6)	17 Dec 2004	Everton Park Sports Centre, Liverpool, England	
10	Win	10-0	Buster Dennis	PTS	6	10 Sep 2004	Everton Park Sports Centre, Liverpool, England	
9	Win	9-0	Henry Janes	PTS	4	3 Apr 2004	Manchester Arena, Manchester, England	
8	Win	8-0	Gareth Payne	TKO	4 (4)	26 Feb 2004	Kingsway Leisure Centre, Widnes, England	
7	Win	7-0	Peter Buckley	PTS	4	13 Dec 2003	Manchester Arena, Manchester, England	
6	Win	6-0	Aliaksei Volchan	TKO	2 (4)	2 Oct 2003	Everton Park Sports Centre, Liverpool, England	
5	Win	5-0	Marty Kayes	RTD	2 (4)	29 Aug 2003	Everton Park Sports Centre, Liverpool, England	
4	Win	4-0	Henry Janes	TKO	1 (4)	20 Jun 2003	Everton Park Sports Centre, Liverpool, England	
3	Win	3-0	Steve Gethin	TKO	3 (4)	8 May 2003	Kingsway Leisure Centre, Widnes, England	
2	Win	2-0	Jus Wallie	PTS	4	5 Apr 2003	Manchester Arena, Manchester, England	
1	Win	1-0	Sergei Tasimov	TKO	1 (4)	18 Jan 2003	Guild Hall, Preston, England	

Titles in pretence
Preceded by Stephen Foster	World featherweight Champion; WBU recognition 14 October 2006 – 5 April 2008	Succeeded by Choi Tseveenpurev
Achievements
Vacant Title last held by Darleys Pérez	WBA lightweight interim Champion; 18 April 2015 - 21 November 2015; Vacated	Vacant Title next held by Ismael Barroso
