= Stephen Smith (boxer) =

English boxer (born 1985)

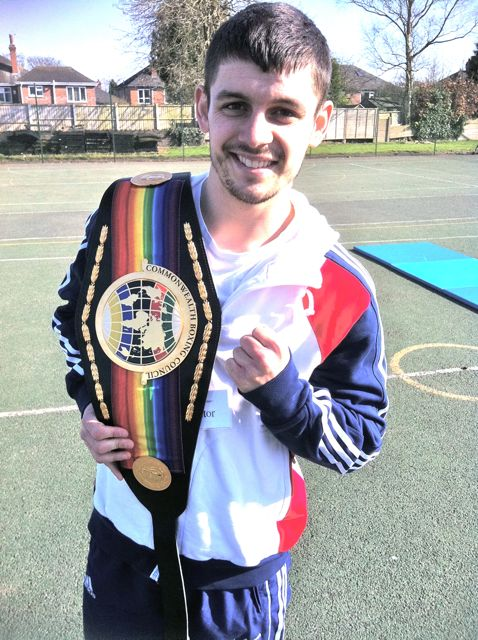
- Smith in 2011

Personal information
- Nickname: Swifty
- Born: Stephen Francis Smith; 22 July 1985 (age 41) Liverpool, Merseyside, England
- Height: 5 ft 6 1/2 in (169 cm)
- Weight: Featherweight; Super-featherweight; Light-welterweight

Boxing career
- Reach: 66 in (168 cm)
- Stance: Orthodox

Boxing record
- Total fights: 32
- Wins: 28
- Win by KO: 15
- Losses: 4
Medal record
boxing
Representing England
Commonwealth Games
Gold medal – first place	2006 Melbourne	Featherweight
Commonwealth Championships
Gold medal – first place	2007 Liverpool	Featherweight
Silver medal – second place	2005 Glasgow	Featherweight
European Amateur Championships
Bronze medal – third place	2006 Plovdiv	Featherweight

Stephen Francis Smith (born 22 July 1985) is an English former professional boxer who competed from 2008 to 2019. He challenged twice for a super-featherweight world championship; the IBF and WBA titles, both in 2016. At regional level he held multiple championships, including the British and Commonwealth featherweight titles and the British super-featherweight title between 2010 and 2013.

== Amateur career ==
A distinguished amateur with over 150 fights, Smith represented Rotunda ABC and achieved fame at the 2006 Commonwealth Games in Melbourne when he defeated Mehrullah Lassi in the final to win Commonwealth Gold. He also won a bronze medal at the 2006 European Amateur Boxing Championships in Plovdiv, losing in the semi-final of that tournament to Albert Selimov. He also won the ABA championships in 2005 and 2006, the Four Nations in 2006 and Gold at the 2007 Commonwealth Federation Championships held in Liverpool.

At the 2007 World Amateur Boxing Championships in Chicago, US he was defeated in the first round losing 20:14 to German Marcel Herfurth, in a tournament in which he had been expected to perform well.

== Professional career ==
Smith turned professional on 21 June 2008 and stopped Shaun Walton in the third round at the National Indoor Arena in Birmingham. Like his brother he signed for Warren's Sports Network

=== Smith vs. Simpson ===
Smith became Commonwealth featherweight champion after he edged a split decision over John Simpson in Glasgow on 4 September 2010. The judges' scorecards were 114–116, 116–114, 116–112 decision was announced following a gruelling battle. A re-match was held on 27 April 2011 with the vacant British title also up for grabs. Smith once again won by majority decision with the judges scores reading 114–114, 115–114 and 118–112.

=== Smith vs. Selby ===
Smith fought the Welsh challenger Lee Selby on 17 September 2011, in a British and Commonwealth title defence at the Olympia, Liverpool where he was stopped in the eighth round by a Selby left hand.

Since losing to Selby, Smith fought Arpad Vass in the Olympiahalle in Munich, Germany on 18 February 2012 winning via KO in Round 1. On 2 March 2012 Smith fought Ben Jones at The Troxy in London winning that fight via technical knockout in round one. On 1 June 2012 Smith fought for the third time in 2012 against Jose Luis Gratero at the York Hall winning again this time on points over eight rounds.

Smith was due to fight on 8 March 2013 on the undercard of Yaqub Kareem v Paul Butler at the Liverpool Olympia however the fight was rescheduled to 12 April 2013. On 8 April 2013 Frank Warren confirmed that the event had been cancelled.

Smith fought for the first time in 13 months on 28 June 2013 against Eddie Nebitt of Belfast at the Liverpool Olympia and won via knockout in round one. In his next fight on 17 August 2013 against Gary Buckland at the Motorpoint Arena in Cardiff, Smith won the British super-featherweight title after he knocked out Buckland in round five.

=== Promotional change ===
In October 2013, Smith announced he was breaking his contract with Frank Warren and signing with Eddie Hearn's Matchroom Boxing. Warren took action through the courts and with the British Boxing Board of Control against Smith's contract termination.

On 31 October 2013 Smith was ordered by the British Boxing Board of Control to fight on 7 December 2013 in Liverpool under the Frank Warren promotion, Smith refused and relinquished his belt, the following day Smith was suspended by the BBBoC pending further investigation into his and Eddie Hearn's conduct in the switch.

On 15 November 2013 Smith was handed back his licence by the BBBoC and his first fight under Matchroom promotions was confirmed to be against Sergio Manuel Medina on the undercard of the Carl Froch v George Groves at Manchester's Phones 4u arena on 23 November 2013, Smith won the fight via knockout in round eight and won the vacant WBC International Silver super-featherweight title.

==== Smith vs. Sosa ====
Smith challenged WBA (Regular) super featherweight champion Jason Sosa at Salle des Étoiles in Monte Carlo, Monaco, on November 12, 2016. He lost via unanimous decision with the ringside judges' scorecards reading 117–110, 116-112 and 116–111.

==== Smith vs. Vargas ====
On 17 August 2017, Smith fought Francisco Vargas, who was ranked #2 by the WBC at super-featherweight. Vargas won in the ninth round via a technical decision after the fight was stopped due to an ear injury suffered by Smith.

== Professional boxing record ==
32 fights	28 wins	4 losses
By knockout	15	1
By decision	13	3

No.	Result	Record	Opponent	Type	Round, time	Date	Location	Notes
32	Win	28–4	(United Kingdom) Jonny Phillips	PTS	6	23 Nov 2019	(United Kingdom) Echo Arena, Liverpool, England	
31	Win	27–4	(United Kingdom) Jaime Quinn	PTS	6	16 Jun 2019	(United Kingdom) Woodhouse Park Lifestyle Centre, Manchester, England	
30	Win	26–4	(United Kingdom) Des Newton	PTS	6	10 May 2019	(United Kingdom) Motorpoint Arena, Nottingham, England	
29	Loss	25–4	(Mexico) Francisco Vargas	TD	9 (10)	9 Dec 2017	(United States) Mandalay Bay Events Center, Paradise, Nevada, U.S.	Smith lost by a technical decision after an accidental headbutt left him with his left ear almost detached
28	Win	25–3	(Hungary) Karoly Gallovich	KO	1 (6)	17 Jun 2017	Rittal Arena, Wetzlar, Germany	
27	Loss	24–3	(United States) Jason Sosa	UD	12	12 Nov 2016	Salle des Etoiles, Monte Carlo, Monaco	For WBA (Regular) super featherweight title
26	Win	24–2	(Argentina) Daniel Brizuela	TKO	7 (12)	29 May 2016	(United Kingdom) Goodison Park, Liverpool, England	Won vacant WBC Silver super featherweight title
25	Loss	23–2	(Puerto Rico) José Pedraza	UD	12	16 Apr 2016	(United States) Foxwoods Resort, Mashantucket, Connecticut, U.S.	For IBF super featherweight title
24	Win	23–1	(Italy) Devis Boschiero	TKO	6 (12)	19 Sep 2015	(United Kingdom) Liverpool Olympia, Liverpool, England	
23	Win	22–1	(United Kingdom) Barrington Brown	PTS	6	4 Apr 2015	(United Kingdom) Metro Radio Arena, Newcastle, England	
22	Win	21–1	(Poland) Jacek Wylezol	PTS	6	28 Mar 2014	(United Kingdom) Motorpoint Arena Sheffield, Sheffield, England	
21	Win	20–1	(Mexico) Pedro Navarrete	PTS	8	14 Jun 2014	(United Kingdom) Echo Arena, Liverpool, England	
20	Win	19–1	(Argentina) Mauricio Javier Munoz	RTD	8 (12)	21 May 2014	(United Kingdom) First Direct Arena, Leeds, England	Won WBC Silver super featherweight title
19	Win	18–1	(Argentina) Sergio Manuel Medina	KO	8 (10)	23 Nov 2013	(United Kingdom) Phones4u Arena, Manchester, England	Won vacant WBC International Silver super featherweight title
18	Win	17–1	(United Kingdom) Gary Buckland	KO	5 (12)	17 Aug 2013	(United Kingdom) Motorpoint Arena Cardiff, Cardiff, Wales	Won British super featherweight title
17	Win	16–1	(Republic of Ireland) Eddie Nesbitt	KO	1 (6)	28 Jun 2013	(United Kingdom) Liverpool Olympia, Liverpool, England	
16	Win	15–1	(Venezuela) Jose Luis Graterol	PTS	8	1 Jun 2012	(United Kingdom) York Hall, London, England	
15	Win	14–1	(United Kingdom) Ben Jones	TKO	1 (12)	2 Mar 2012	(United Kingdom) The Troxy, London, England	Won WBO Intercontinental super featherweight title
14	Win	13–1	(Hungary) Arpad Vass	KO	1 (8)	18 Feb 2012	Olympiahalle, Munich, Germany	
13	Loss	12–1	(United Kingdom) Lee Selby	KO	8 (12)	17 Sep 2011	(United Kingdom) Liverpool Olympia, Liverpool, England	Lost British featherweight title
12	Win	12–0	(United Kingdom) John Simpson	MD	12	27 Apr 2011	(United Kingdom) Liverpool Olympia, Liverpool, England	Won British featherweight title
11	Win	11–0	(United Kingdom) John Simpson	SD	12	4 Sep 2010	(United Kingdom) Kelvin Hall, Glasgow, Scotland	Won Commonwealth featherweight title
10	Win	10–0	(United Kingdom) Jason Thomas	TKO	1 (8)	12 Mar 2010	(United Kingdom) Echo Arena, Liverpool, England	
9	Win	9–0	(United Kingdom) Chris Riley	PTS	4	5 Dec 2009	(United Kingdom) Metro Radio Arena, Newcastle, England	
8	Win	8–0	(United Kingdom) Gavin Reid	PTS	8	30 Oct 2009	(United Kingdom) Echo Arena, Liverpool, England	
7	Win	7–0	(Hungary) Zsolt Nagy	PTS	6	22 May 2009	(United Kingdom) York Hall, London, England	
6	Win	6–0	(United Kingdom) Steve Gethin	RTD	1 (4)	28 Feb 2009	(United Kingdom) National Indoor Arena, Birmingham, England	
5	Win	5–0	(United Kingdom) Anthony Hanna	PTS	4	12 Dec 2008	(United Kingdom) Kingsway Leisure Centre, Widnes, England	
4	Win	4–0	(United Kingdom) Sid Razak	TKO	3 (4)	31 Oct 2008	(United Kingdom) Aston Villa Leisure Centre, Birmingham, England	
3	Win	3–0	(United Kingdom) Robin Deakin	TKO	2 (4)	10 Oct 2008	(United Kingdom) Everton Park Sports Centre, Liverpool, England	
2	Win	2–0	(Moldova) Wladimir Borov	TKO	1 (4)	6 Sep 2008	(United Kingdom) MEN Arena, Manchester, England	
1	Win	1–0	(United Kingdom) Shaun Walton	KO	3 (4)	21 Jun 2008	(United Kingdom) National Indoor Arena, Birmingham, England	

== Personal life ==
Stephen Smith is the younger brother of the boxer; Paul Smith, and the older brother of the boxers; Liam Smith, and Callum Smith.
