= John Simpson (boxer) =

Scottish boxer

Personal information
- Nationality: British
- Born: 26 July 1983 (age 42) Greenock, Scotland
- Height: 5 ft 7 in (170 cm)
- Weight: Featherweight; Super-featherweight; Lightweight

Boxing career
- Reach: 65 in (165 cm)
- Stance: Orthodox

Boxing record
- Total fights: 37
- Wins: 26
- Win by KO: 11
- Losses: 11

John Simpson (born 26 July 1983) is a Scottish former professional boxer who competed from 2002 to 2015. He held the British featherweight title twice between 2006 and 2010 and the Commonwealth featherweight title from 2009 to 2010.

== Professional career ==
Simpson's professional boxing career began in September 2002, with a first-round knockout of Simon Chambers. Simpson suffered a setback when he lost his second fight on points against Lee Holmes. Simpson remained undefeated in his next ten fights, and a victory over Marc Callaghan led to him receiving a shot at the British featherweight title.

=== British title challenges ===
On 5 November 2004, Simpson faced Dazzo Williams in a challenge for the British featherweight title. Simpson lost a very close points decision as referee Phil Edwards scored the bout 115–114 in favour of Williams. After a six-month lay off, Simpson returned to the ring to defeat former European lightweight title challenger Dariusz Snarski via a third-round knockout.

On 5 November 2005, exactly one-year after his last title challenge, Simpson fought Andy Morris for the vacant British featherweight title. Simpson was defeated by a unanimous decision with scores of 118–111, 117–111 and 118–110. Following this fight, Simpson lost to Stephen Foster Jr. via a unanimous points decision in a challenge for the WBU featherweight title.

On 9 December 2006, Simpson fought Andy Morris in his third challenge for the British featherweight title. Simpson claimed the title after stopping Morris in the 5th round. The fight was stopped after referee John Keane deemed that a cut over Morris' left eye was too severe to allow the fight to continue. Morris' trainer Bob Shannon has argued that his fighter should have been allowed to continue.

=== WBU title ===
On 10 March 2007, Simpson lost a controversial points decision to Derry Mathews in a contest for the WBU featherweight title. Matthews was floored in the first round before Simpson was badly cut by an accidental headbutt. Mathews went on to be deducted points in the 6th and 9th rounds for hitting behind the head and holding. Despite the deductions and the knockdown, Mathews was awarded a wide points decision with scores of 118–112, 117–110 and 113–111. It was later announced that two of the ringside judges had failed to deduct the two points Mathews lost from their scorecards.

=== British title defences ===
On 6 August 2007, Simpson defended his British featherweight title with a fifth-round knockout of Ryan Barrett.

On 7 September 2007, Simpson fought Andy Morris for a third time and defeated him via a seventh-round knockout to defend his British title. After the fight, Simpson said "I hope I can go on to bigger and better things now. Hopefully now I can go on to European and World titles, I started boxing to win a World title and that is my ambition".

On 6 June 2008, Simpson lost his British featherweight title to Paul Appleby in a close unanimous points decision.

On 28 November 2008, Simpson returned to the ring to defeat Kenyan John Gicharu on points over 8 rounds.

=== Commonwealth Champion ===
On 16 January 2009, Simpson travelled to Middlesbrough to meet Paul Truscott for Truscott's Commonwealth featherweight Championship. The fight ended in victory for Simpson following a clash of heads which caused the fight to be stopped on cuts in the 8th round. On 4 September 2009 Simpson made his first defence against the man he had beaten for the title. The fight once again took place in Middlesbrough and saw the Scotsman retain his title this time stopping Truscott in the 10th round with both fighters contesting a furiously paced bout.

== Notable bouts ==
Result	Opponent	Type	Rd., Time	Date	Location	Notes
Win	(United Kingdom) Paul Truscott	TKO	8 (12), 0.54	16 January 2009	(United Kingdom) Middlesbrough, England	Won Commonwealth Featherweight title
Loss	(United Kingdom) Paul Appleby	Decision (unanimous)	12	6 June 2008	(United Kingdom) Glasgow, Scotland	Lost British Featherweight title.
Win	(United Kingdom) Andy Morris	TKO	7 (12), 0.53	7 September 2007	(United Kingdom) London, England	Defended British Featherweight title.
Win	(United Kingdom) Ryan Barrett	KO	5 (12), 2.50	6 August 2007	(United Kingdom) London, England	Defended British Featherweight title.
Loss	(United Kingdom) Derry Mathews	Decision (unanimous)	12	10 March 2007	(United Kingdom) Liverpool, England	Bout for Matthews' WBU Featherweight title.
Win	(United Kingdom) Andy Morris	TKO	5 (12), 2.27	9 December 2006	(United Kingdom) London, England	Won British Featherweight title.
Loss	(United Kingdom) Stephen Foster Jr.	Decision (unanimous)	12	1 April 2006	(United Kingdom) London, England	Bout for Foster's WBU Featherweight title.
Loss	(United Kingdom) Andy Morris	Decision (unanimous)	12	5 November 2005	(United Kingdom) Glasgow, Scotland	Bout for vacant British Featherweight title.
Loss	(United Kingdom) Dazzo Williams	Decision	12	5 November 2004	(United Kingdom) Hereford, England	Bout for Williams' British Featherweight title.

== See also ==
- List of British featherweight boxing champions

Regional boxing titles
Preceded by Andy Morris	British featherweight champion 9 December 2006 – 6 June 2008	Succeeded by Paul Appleby
Preceded by Paul Truscott	Commonwealth featherweight champion 16 January 2009 – 4 September 2010	Succeeded by Stephen Smith
Preceded by Martin Lindsay	British featherweight champion 15 December 2010 – 27 April 2011	Succeeded by Stephen Smith
Preceded by Paul Appleby	Celtic Area super-featherweight champion 29 June 2012 – April 2013	Vacant Title next held by Anthony Cacace
Vacant Title last held by Sergio Thompson	WBC International Silver super-featherweight champion 11 May 2013 – October 2013	Vacant Title next held by Stephen Smith
