= Levan Kirakosyan =

Russian boxer (born 1973)

Personal information
- Nationality: Armenian
- Born: Levan Kirakosyan; 24 December 1973 (age 52) Gyumri, Armenian SSR, U.S.S.R.
- Weight: Super Featherweight

Boxing career
- Stance: Orthodox

Boxing record
- Total fights: 40
- Wins: 34
- Win by KO: 23
- Losses: 6
- Draws: 0
- No contests: 0

Levan Kirakosyan (born 24 December 1973) is an Armenian former professional boxer who competed from 1999 to 2012. He twice held the European super featherweight title between 2007 and 2010.

== Professional career ==
In 2005, Levan Kirakosyan was the World Boxing Foundation (WBFo) World Champion.

On 3 March 2007, he defeated Antonio João Bento to capture the vacant European super featherweight title. He defended, lost, regained, and again lost that title.
