= Héctor Alfredo Ávila =

Argentine boxer (born 1975)

Personal information
- Nickname: El Tiburón ("The Shark")
- Born: 17 April 1975 (age 51) Los Polvorines, Buenos Aires, Argentina
- Height: 6 ft 1 in (185 cm)
- Weight: Cruiserweight; Heavyweight

Boxing career
- Stance: Orthodox

Boxing record
- Total fights: 41
- Wins: 24
- Win by KO: 15
- Losses: 16
- Draws: 1

Héctor Alfredo Ávila (born 17 April 1974) is an Argentine former professional boxer who competed from 1999 to 2016. At regional level, he held multiple championships, including the Argentinian cruiserweight title from 2005 to 2009.

== Professional career ==
On 20 April 2013, Ávila faced former world title challenger Derek Chisora on the undercard of Nathan Cleverly against Robin Krasniqi, in London, England. Ávila had one point deducted in the 6th round for holding and another in the 9th for use of the elbow, but was eventually stopped in the ninth round.

On 1 March 2014, Ávila faced Olympic gold medallist Anthony Joshua on the undercard of Ricky Burns against Terence Crawford, in Glasgow, Scotland. Ávila lost the fight in a first-round KO.

== Professional boxing record ==
41 fights	24 wins	16 losses
By knockout	15	12
By decision	8	4
By disqualification	1	0
Draws	1	

No.	Result	Record	Opponent	Type	Round, time	Date	Location	Notes
41	Win	24–16–1	Pablo Alejandro Aima	KO	5 (8)	26 Feb 2016	B-52 Boxing Club, Buenos Aires, Argentina	
40	Win	23–16–1	Fernando Nahuel Lobos	UD	8	8 Jan 2016	B-52 Boxing Club, Buenos Aires, Argentina	
39	Loss	22–16–1	Anthony Joshua	KO	1 (6), 2:14	1 Mar 2014	Exhibition and Conference Centre, Glasgow, Scotland	
38	Loss	22–15–1	Marcelo Domínguez	TKO	7 (10)	31 Aug 2013	Club Atlético, Social y Deportivo Camioneros, Buenos Aires, Argentina	
37	Win	22–14–1	Jose Manuel Farias	KO	3 (6), 1:21	17 Aug 2013	Club Social y Cultural El Cruce, Buenos Aires, Argentina	
36	Loss	21–14–1	Irineu Beato Costa Junior	KO	1 (12)	8 Jun 2013	São Paulo, Brazil	For vacant WBO Latino heavyweight title
35	Win	21–13–1	Icho Larenas	UD	6	24 May 2013	Club Social y Cultural El Cruce, Buenos Aires, Argentina	
34	Loss	20–13–1	Derek Chisora	TKO	9 (10), 2:49	20 Apr 2013	Wembley Arena, London, England	
33	Win	20–12–1	Martin David Islas	SD	6	23 Mar 2013	Club Social y Cultural El Cruce, Buenos Aires, Argentina	
32	Win	19–12–1	Emilio Ezequiel Zarate	RTD	6 (10), 3:00	12 Jan 2013	Club Social y Cultural El Cruce, Buenos Aires, Argentina	Won vacant WBC interim Mundo Hispano heavyweight title
31	Win	18–12–1	Walter David Cabral	DQ	1 (6)	1 Dec 2012	Club Social y Cultural El Cruce, Buenos Aires, Argentina	
30	Loss	17–12–1	Walter David Cabral	TD	3 (8), 3:00	18 Aug 2012	Club Social y Cultural El Cruce, Buenos Aires, Argentina	
29	Loss	17–11–1	Jovo Pudar	KO	2 (12), 2:20	30 Sep 2011	Hotel Jugoslavija, Belgrade, Serbia	For WBA-PABA heavyweight title
28	Win	17–10–1	Emilio Ezequiel Zarate	UD	8	7 May 2011	Club Social y Cultural El Cruce, Buenos Aires, Argentina	
27	Loss	16–10–1	Cesar David Crenz	TKO	1 (10), 2:54	28 Feb 2009	Club Union, Buenos Aires, Argentina	Lost Argentina cruiserweight title
26	Loss	16–9–1	Pedro Otas	TD	10 (12), 3:00	22 Feb 2008	Ginasio Municipal Guaibé, São Paulo, Brazil	For vacant WBO interim Latino cruiserweight title
25	Loss	16–8–1	Aleksandr Alekseyev	KO	1 (12), 2:32	16 Jun 2007	SYMA Sport & Leisure Center, Budapest, Hungary	For vacant WBO Inter-Continental cruiserweight title
24	Win	16–7–1	Sergio Martin Beaz	TKO	3 (4)	26 May 2007	Gimnasio Municipal, Buenos Aires, Argentina	
23	Loss	15–7–1	Yoan Pablo Hernández	UD	8	14 Apr 2007	Porsche-Arena, Stuttgart, Germany	
22	Win	15–6–1	Héctor Ricardo Sotelo	TKO	5 (10), 1:52	17 Mar 2007	Gimnasio Municipal, Buenos Aires, Argentina	Retained Argentina cruiserweight title
21	Loss	14–6–1	Héctor Ricardo Sotelo	TKO	8 (10)	27 Jan 2007	Unidad Funcional Pueblo Chico, Buenos Aires, Argentina	
20	Win	14–5–1	Jose Luis Loyola	KO	2 (10)	8 Sep 2006	Tucumán, Argentina	
19	Loss	13–5–1	Krzysztof Włodarczyk	KO	6 (10), 2:06	24 Sep 2005	Katowice, Poland	
18	Win	13–4–1	Adolfo Obando	TKO	5 (10), 2:21	20 Aug 2005	Ce.De.M. N° 2, Buenos Aires, Argentina	
17	Win	12–4–1	Orlando Antonio Farias	KO	2 (10), 2:07	26 Mar 2005	Sociedad Alemana de Gimnasia, Buenos Aires, Argentina	Retained Argentina cruiserweight title
16	Win	11–4–1	Cesar David Crenz	KO	2 (10), 0:52	26 Feb 2005	Estadio FAB, Buenos Aires, Argentina	Won vacant Argentina cruiserweight title
15	Draw	10–4–1	Sergio Martin Beaz	SD	8	9 Oct 2004	Club Atletico Villa Mitre, Buenos Aires, Argentina	
14	Loss	10–4	Cesar David Crenz	TKO	6 (6)	14 Feb 2004	Club Atletico Mar del Plata, Buenos Aires, Argentina	
13	Loss	10–3	Giacobbe Fragomeni	PTS	8	14 Oct 2003	Pala Italia Online, Milan, Italy	
12	Loss	10–2	Miguel Angel Antonio Aguirre	KO	7 (12)	12 Jul 2003	Gimnasio Malvinas Argentinas, Buenos Aires, Argentina	For South American cruiserweight title
11	Win	10–1	Luis Oscar Ricail	TKO	6 (12)	7 Mar 2003	Buenos Aires, Argentina	Won vacant WBC Mundo Hispano cruiserweight title
10	Win	9–1	Adolfo Obando	TKO	6 (6)	26 Nov 2002	Casino Trillenium, Buenos Aires, Argentina	
9	Win	8–1	Jose Daniel Velazquez	UD	4	13 Apr 2002	Estadio FAB, Buenos Aires, Argentina	
8	Loss	7–1	Vincenzo Cantatore	TKO	5 (12), 2:01	23 Feb 2002	Milan, Italy	For WBC International cruiserweight title
7	Win	7–0	Aaron Orlando Soria	UD	4	8 Sep 2001	Estadio FAB, Buenos Aires, Argentina	
6	Win	6–0	Juan Eduardo Zabala	TKO	2 (4), 2:19	21 Jul 2001	Polideportivo Municipal, Buenos Aires, Argentina	
5	Win	5–0	Luis Oscar Ricail	UD	6	17 Mar 2001	Ce.De.M. N° 2, Buenos Aires, Argentina	
4	Win	4–0	Luis Oscar Ricail	UD	4	17 Feb 2001	Gimnasio Ian Bartney, Misiones, Argentina	
3	Win	3–0	Jorge Enrique Arguello	KO	2 (6)	25 Feb 2000	Buenos Aires, Argentina	
2	Win	2–0	Jorge Mario Torres	RTD	2 (4), 3:00	24 Sep 1999	Santa Cruz, Argentina	
1	Win	1–0	Jorge Nolberto Gimenez	KO	2 (6), 2:55	15 Jan 1999	Club Social y Deportivo Mar de Ajó, Buenos Aires, Argentina	

Sporting positions
Regional boxing titles
Vacant Title last held by Aaron Orlando Soria	WBC Mundo Hispano cruiserweight champion 7 March 2003 – September 2006; Vacated	Vacant Title next held by Orlando Antonio Farias
Vacant Title last held by Dario Walter Matteoni	Argentinian cruiserweight champion 26 February 2005 – 28 February 2009	Succeeded by Cesar David Crenz
Vacant Title last held by Gonzalo Basile	WBC Mundo Hispano heavyweight champion Interim title 12 January 2013 – June 2014; Vacated	Vacant Title next held by Gonzalo Basile
