= Ricky Burns vs. Julius Indongo =

2017 boxing match

- Date: 15 April 2017
- Venue: Scottish Hydro Arena, Glasgow, Scotland, UK
- Title(s) on the line: WBA, IBF and IBO light welterweight titles

Tale of the tape
Boxer	Ricky Burns	Julius Indongo
Nickname	"The Rickster"	"Blue Machine"
Hometown	Coatbridge, Lanarkshire, UK	Windhoek, Khomas Region, Namibia
Pre-fight record	41–5–1 (14 KO)	21–0 (11 KO)
Age	34 years	34 years, 2 months
Height	5 ft 9 in (175 cm)	5 ft 10 1/2 in (179 cm)
Weight	139 1/4 lb (63 kg)	139 1/4 lb (63 kg)
Style	Orthodox	Southpaw
Recognition	WBA; Light Welterweight Champion; The Ring; No. 5 Ranked Light Welterweight; TBRB; No. 9 Ranked Light Welterweight; 3-division world champion	IBF and IBO; Light Welterweight Champion; TBRB; No. 2 Ranked Light Welterweight; The Ring; No. 7 Ranked Light Welterweight

Result
- Indongo defeats Burns by unanimous decision

Ricky Burns vs. Julius Indongo was a professional boxing match contested on 15 April 2017, for the WBA, IBF and IBO light welterweight championship.

== Background ==
Since winning the vacant WBA 140 lb title in May 2016, to become only the second Brit to win major world titles in three divisions (after Bob Fitzsimmons in 1903), Ricky Burns had made one successful defence against mandatory Kiryl Relikh, running out a unanimous decision winner in October. Following this victory a December fight against former champion Adrien Broner (who had held the WBA belt before Burns but had been stripped for missing weight in March), possibly in the US, was mooted.

In late December 2016 however, there were talks for a potential unification bout between Burns and IBF and IBO champion Julius Indongo, who had acquired the titles after knocking out then undefeated Eduard Troyanovsky in less than a minute on 3 December, in his first bout outside of his native Namibia. Also, in January 2017, Freddie Roach named Burns a potential opponent for Filipino legend Manny Pacquiao for 23 April bout. On 9 January, Burns's manager Tommy Morrison confirmed a deal was being put together for Burns to fight Indongo in April at The SSE Hydro in Glasgow. On 11 January, Sky Sports confirmed a deal was reached for Burns and Indongo in a unification title bout on 15 April. This was Scotland's first ever unification fight.

It was hoped that a victory for Burns would set up potential bouts with Broner, former Lightweight champion Anthony Crolla or an undisputed showdown with Terence Crawford, who had beaten Burns back in March 2014.

Indongo would tell BBC Scotland that he believed that Burns was making a lot of mistakes that he could take advance of saying "He is making a lot of mistakes, if he is not aware of those mistakes, I feel pity for him." He also revealed that the Namibian president, Hage Geingob, had spoken to him in advance of the bout "I have been sent on a mission by my president, and also by the force, because I work as a police officer. I received his blessing and he recommended that I should always keep my guard. He is a man of sport and loves sport very much. It is no pressure. It is an honour. I have been given a privilege and I have to take that responsibility.

In the days before the bout Burns would admit that this was the biggest fight of his career, saying "I said it as soon as the fight was made, for me this is the biggest fight. These unification fights have been spoken about my whole career, now we're just about there so I couldn't be happier with the way all the preparations have gone. I just want to get in and get on with it."

Burns was a 8/15 favorite to win with Indongo the underdog at 7/5.

== The fight ==
The opening round saw Indongo use his height and reach advantage to control the action with his jab, with Burns continuing his recent tendency to start a bout slowly before finding his rhythm. Indongo's greater work-rate and accuracy continued through the first four rounds before Burns began to find the mark more frequently with his right hand in the next two, forcing Indongo back with his aggression. Although Indongo was never able to hurt Burns, his accumulation cleaner punches landed meant that as the bout moved towards the championship rounds, Burns appeared to need to stop Indongo in order to keep his title. As Burns over-stretched attempting to land a match altering shot he thrice found himself on the canvas but these were all ruled as a slips. The fight landed the full 12 round distance and Indongo was awarded a unanimous decision victory with scores of 120–108, 118–110 and 116–112.

== Aftermath ==
Speaking after the bout Indongo said "I feel very proud. My home crowd are watching. It's for the whole of Africa. This is so great. I am very proud for opening my doors and now the world can see me."

Following the defeat, Burns praised the new unified champion, "He was so so awkward. He was a lot better than we thought he was going to be. He can hit as well. He started the rounds fast and the height and reach advantage meant he was out of my distance." He also said that he wouldn't retire, "I'm going to have all the doubters saying I'm finished - but I'll come again".

Trainer Adam Booth, speaking on BBC Radio 5 Sports Extra criticized Burns' performance as one-dimensional, saying "It was pretty one-dimensional from Ricky Burns, who was trying to jump in from long distance on a fighter who was bigger, with longer arms and a heavy puncher. Indongo was dominant, knew what he was about, kept swinging dangerous bombs and didn't let Burns in at all. In the last two rounds, when he had the match won, he still wanted to dominate, and like true champions, wanted to get rid of his challenger. He ticks all the right boxes. It is going to take a high-level operator to cope with him. I think Terence Crawford is that kind of guy."

Later Burns suggested that that he was "not entertaining" an all-Scottish fight against Commonwealth champion, Josh Taylor, while his promoter Eddie Hearn mooted either the bout with Broner or Crolla.

On 1 July, promoters Top Rank announced that Indongo and WBC, WBO, Ring magazine and lineal champion Terence Crawford had agreed to face each other on 19 August in Lincoln, Nebraska, U.S., to determine the first undisputed light welterweight champion since Kostya Tszyu in 2004 and the first undisputed champion in any weight class since the WBO became fully recognized as the fourth major sanctioning body in 2007.

== Undercard ==
Confirmed bouts:

Winner	Loser	Weight division/title belt(s) disputed	Result
(United Kingdom) Charlie Edwards	(United Kingdom) Iain Butcher	vacant British Super Flyweight title	Unanimous decision
(United Kingdom) Josh Kelly	(Republic of Ireland) Jay Byrne	Middleweight (8 rounds)	Points decision
(United Kingdom) Robbie Barrett	(United Kingdom) Scott Cardle	British Lightweight title	Majority decision
(United Kingdom) Lawrence Okolie	(Poland) Lukasz Rusiewicz	Cruiserweight (4 rounds)	1st-round TKO
Preliminary bouts
(United Kingdom) Charlie Flynn	(United Kingdom) Ryan Collins	vacant Celtic Lightweight title	Technical draw
(United Kingdom) Joe Ham	(United Kingdom) Scott McCormack	Scottish Super Bantamweight title	Points decision
Non-TV bouts
(United Kingdom) Ryan Smith	(United Kingdom) Josh Thorne	Light Welterweight (4 rounds)	Unanimous decision
(United Kingdom) Ally Black	(United Kingdom) Mark Weston	Welterweight (4 rounds)	1st-round TKO
(United Kingdom) Lewis Paulin	(United Kingdom) Luke Fash	Super Featherweight (4 rounds)	4th-round TKO

== Broadcasting ==
Country	Broadcaster
Hungary	Sport 1
Panama	Cable Onda Sports
United Kingdom	Sky Sports

Preceded by vs. Kiryl Relikh	Ricky Burns's bouts 15 April 2017	Succeeded by vs. Anthony Crolla
Preceded by vs. Eduard Troyanovsky	Julius Indongo's bouts 15 April 2017	Succeeded by vs. Terence Crawford
