= Terence Crawford vs. Julius Indongo =

Boxing match

- Date: August 19, 2017
- Venue: Pinnacle Bank Arena, Lincoln, Nebraska, U.S.
- Title(s) on the line: WBA (Super), WBC, IBF, WBO, The Ring and TBRB undisputed light welterweight titles

Tale of the tape
Boxer	Terence Crawford	Julius Indongo
Nickname	"Bud"	"Blue Machine"
Hometown	Omaha, Nebraska, U.S.	Windhoek, Khomas Region, Namibia
Pre-fight record	31–0 (22 KO)	22–0 (11 KO)
Age	29 years, 10 months	34 years, 6 months
Height	5 ft 8 in (173 cm)	5 ft 10 1/2 in (179 cm)
Weight	140 lb (64 kg)	139 lb (63 kg)
Style	Southpaw (Note: Listed by BoxRec as southpaw, but regularly switch hits as an orthodox.)	Southpaw
Recognition	WBC, WBO, The Ring and TBRB; Light Welterweight Champion; The Ring No. 4 ranked pound-for-pound fighter 2-division world champion	WBA (Unified) and IBF; Light Welterweight Champion; TBRB; No. 1 Ranked Light Welterweight; The Ring; No. 2 Ranked Light Welterweight

Result
- Crawford won by 3rd-round KO.

Terence Crawford vs. Julius Indongo was a professional boxing match contested on August 19, 2017, for the undisputed light welterweight championship. The bout took place at the Pinnacle Bank Arena in Lincoln, Nebraska. Crawford defeated Indongo via third-round KO.

== Background ==
Following his reign as the WBO lightweight champion in 2014, Crawford moved up to light welterweight in April 2015 to capture the vacant WBO title against Thomas Dulorme. After two defences of his title, he defeated WBC champion Viktor Postol in July 2016 to unify the WBC, and WBO titles, while also capturing the vacant Ring magazine title in the process.

Indongo defeated reigning champion Eduard Troyanovsky in December 2016 to capture the IBF, and IBO light welterweight titles. Four months later he defeated reigning champion Ricky Burns for the WBA (Unified) title in April 2017, capturing the last of the four major world titles in the light welterweight division and setting up the undisputed title fight. Indongo's IBO title was not on the line as the Namibian champion had been stripped of the title for refusing to pay the IBO's sanctioning fees, which already stood at $100,000 for each fighter.

The winner would be the first undisputed light welterweight champion since Kostya Tszyu in 2004 and the first undisputed champion in any weight division since O'Neil Bell in 2006. The bout would also be the first time all what is now considered the four major belts had been at stake in a single fight since Bernard Hopkins vs. Jermain Taylor in 2005, although the WBO didn't become a major title until 2007.

Crawford entered the fight as a heavy favourite to win.

== The fight ==
The first round was a tentative affair; both fighters attempting to establish their presence in the center of the ring, engaging in a battle of the jabs with neither fighter landing any significant punches. The second round began the same as the previous. Halfway through the round Crawford began increasing his punch output. With a minute left in the round, Crawford caught Indongo with a straight left hand, sending the Namibian champion to the canvas. Indongo raised to his feet before the referee's count of five and survived the rest of the round.

The first minute of round three saw both fighters throwing the jab and missing with the occasional left hand from the southpaw stance. 1 minute into the round, Indongo began putting together combinations and walking towards Crawford. At the halfway point, as Indongo rushed in on the offensive, Crawford landed two solid body punches to drop Indongo for a second time. With Indongo laid on his back wincing in pain, referee Jack Reiss reached the count of ten, crowning Crawford as the new undisputed light welterweight champion by a third-round knockout.

According to CompuBox stats, Crawford landed 26 of his 75 punches thrown (35%), while Indongo landed 13 of 74 thrown (18%).

== Aftermath ==
Following the fight, Indongo stated "When he hit me like that, my mind was gone" about Crawford's body shot.

The card averaged 965,000 viewers on ESPN.

Two days after the fight, the IBF ordered a fight between Crawford and their mandatory challenger, Sergey Lipinets. Lipinets was named Indongo's mandatory challenger in December 2016, but Indongo was given an exemption to allow the unification fight with Crawford to happen. Lipinets stated that the IBF title was "stolen from him". As Crawford didn't plan to return to the ring before the IBF's deadline, he vacated the IBF title just 11 days after defeating Indongo, ending his undisputed reign. The IBF ordered Lipinets to face Akihiro Kondo for their vacant title.

== Fight card ==
Confirmed bouts:

Weight Class		vs.		Method	Round	Time	Notes
Light welterweight	(United States) Terence Crawford (c)	def.	(Namibia) Julius Indongo (c)	TKO	3/12	1:38	^{Note 1}
Light heavyweight	(Ukraine) Oleksandr Gvozdyk (c)	def.	(United States) Craig Baker	TKO	6/10	2:04	^{Note 2}
Light welterweight	(United States) Mike Reed	def.	(United States) Robert Franckel	UD	10
Heavyweight	(United Kingdom) Dillian Whyte	def.	(United States) Malcolm Tann	TKO	3/8	2:36
Heavyweight	(United States) Bryant Jennings	def.	(United States) Daniel Martz	TKO	2/8	2:48
Welterweight	(United States) Mike Alvarado	def.	(Brazil) Sidney Siqueira	KO	4/8	1:27
Featherweight	(United States) Shakur Stevenson	def.	(Argentina) David Paz	UD	6
Light heavyweight	(United States) Steven Nelson	def.	(Mexico) César Ruiz	UD	6
Lightweight	(United States) Kevin Ventura	def.	(Mexico) Baltazar Ramirez	TKO	3/4	1:54

^Note 1 For WBA (Super), WBC, IBF, WBO, and The Ring light welterweight titles
^Note 2 For WBC-NABF, and WBO-NABO light heavyweight titles

== Broadcasting ==
Country	Broadcaster
Canada	Super Channel
Panama	RPC
United Kingdom	Sky Sports
United States	ESPN

== See also ==
- List of undisputed world boxing champions

== Notes ==
Preceded by vs. Félix Díaz	Terence Crawford's bouts 19 August 2017	Succeeded by vs. Jeff Horn
Preceded by vs. Ricky Burns	Julius Indongo's bouts 19 August 2017	Succeeded by vs. Regis Prograis
