= Julius Indongo =

Namibian boxer (born 1983)

Personal information
- Nickname: Blue Machine
- Nationality: Namibian
- Born: Julius Munyelele Indongo; 12 February 1983 (age 43) Windhoek, South West Africa
- Height: 5 ft 10 1/2 in (179 cm)
- Weight: Lightweight; Light-welterweight; Welterweight; Light-middleweight

Boxing career
- Reach: 71 1/2 in (182 cm)
- Stance: Southpaw

Boxing record
- Total fights: 31
- Wins: 24
- Win by KO: 13
- Losses: 7

Julius Munyelele Indongo (born 12 February 1983) is a Namibian professional boxer. He is a former light-welterweight world champion, having held the WBA (Regular), IBF, and IBO titles between 2016 and 2017. As an amateur, Indongo represented Namibia at the 2008 Olympics, reaching the first round of the lightweight bracket.

== Amateur career ==
Indongo first took up boxing at the age of 17. In 2002, he won the amateur Namibian National Championships and he appeared poised for success. However, Indongo was struck by tuberculosis, which interrupted his career for 2 years. After recovering, Indongo qualified to represent his country in the 2008 Olympics. Right before his first fight, Indongo broke his right hand. He decided to fight regardless but was easily outpointed by Anthony Little.

== Professional career ==
=== Early career ===
Indongo debuted professionally at the age of 25, on 25 July 2009, with a points decision (PTS) win over Pohamba Mandume. After winning his first six fights, he won his first regional title, the Namibian lightweight title, by defeating Samuel Kapapu, and retained it against Peter Malakia.

After improving to 14 consecutive wins, he won the WBO Africa light-welterweight title in October 2012 via victory over James Onyango. Indongo went on to make six successful defenses of that title between 2014 and 2016. Indongo was a late bloomer on the world stage, with his first world title fight taking place when he was 33. His trainer, Nestor Tobias, stated that he often needed to be more aggressive and "deliver the killer punch".

=== light-welterweight champion ===
In October 2016, undefeated IBF and IBO light-welterweight champion Eduard Troyanovsky (25–0, 22 KOs) stated he would make a voluntary defence on the Lebedev-Gassiev card in Russia on 3 December. On 7 November, Indongo, who was ranked WBO #3, WBA #15 and IBF #10, was announced as his opponent, for the fight to take place in Moscow, in his first bout held outside of Namibia. Despite being a favoured underdog, Indongo knocked out Troyanovsky after only forty seconds of the first round with a left hook, becoming Namibia's fourth world boxing champion. Troyanovsky was badly hurt from the shot and did not get up. Referee Mark Calo-Oy immediately halted the fight with Troyanovsky still down on the canvas. After some assistance, they eventually got Troyanovsky back to his feet and took him out of the ring.

In late December, there were talks for a potential fight between Indongo and WBA (Regular) Light Welterweight champion Ricky Burns. On 9 January, Burns' manager Tommy Morrison confirmed a deal was being put together for Burns to fight Indongo in April at The SSE Hydro in Glasgow. On 11 January, Sky Sports confirmed a deal was reached for Burns and Indongo title bout on 15 April 2017. The WBA (Regular), IBF and IBO titles would be at stake. This was Scotland's first ever unification fight. Burns lost the fight via a one-sided unanimous decision with wide scores of 120–108, 118-110 and 116–112. In the last two rounds, Burns hit the canvas three times, but these were ruled as a slip. Following the defeat, Burns praised Indongo, "He was so so awkward. He was a lot better than we thought he was going to be. He can hit as well." He also said that he wouldn't retire.

==== Indongo vs. Crawford ====
On 1 July 2017, Top Rank announced that a light welterweight unification fight between Indongo and WBC, WBO, Ring magazine, and lineal champion Terence Crawford was agreed to take place on 19 August at the Pinnacle Bank Arena in Lincoln, Nebraska live on ESPN in US and Sky Sports in the UK. The projected unification of every major world title in boxing (WBA, WBC, IBF, WBO, The Ring, and lineal) will determine the light welterweight division's first undisputed champion since Kostya Tszyu in 2004, and the first time all the aforementioned titles have been at stake in a single fight since Bernard Hopkins vs. Jermain Taylor in 2005. Both fighters paid over US$100,000 in sanctioning fees. Indongo vacated the IBO belt to avoid paying even more in sanctioning fees. Crawford entered the fight as a heavy favourite to win.

On fight night, Crawford dominated Indongo, knocking him down in the second round before finishing him with a vicious body shot in just three rounds. The fight took place in front of a raucous home crowd for Crawford. Crawford landed 27 total punches to Indongo's 13 and 17 power punches to Indongo's 10. According to CompuBox stats, Crawford landed 26 of his 75 punches thrown (35%), while Indongo landed 13 of 74 thrown (18%). Both boxers earned an undisclosed 7-figure purse. Following the fight, Indongo stated "When he hit me like that, my mind was gone" about Crawford's body shot. The card averaged 965,000 viewers on ESPN.

=== Career from 2018 ===
On 5 January 2018, Lou DiBella of DiBella Entertainment announced that he had signed Indongo on a long-term promotional contract. A few hours later, Nestor Tobias, Indongo's manager and promoter from Namibia claimed that Indongo and DiBella had breached contract. Tobias stated that Indongo was under contract with his MTC Nestor Sunshine Boxing & Fitness Academy until 2020.

The WBC super lightweight title became vacant after Terence Crawford decided to move up to welterweight. It was announced that number 1 ranked Amir Imam would fight number 3 ranked Jose Ramirez for the vacant title. WBC President Mauricio Sulaiman then announced that Viktor Postol, who was ranked number 4, would fight number 2 ranked Regis Prograis (20–0, 17 KOs) for the interim WBC title. The winner of both fights would then meet to become the full titleholder. In January 2018, a deal was finally reached for the fight between Postol and Prograis to take place on 9 March at the Buffalo Run Casino in Miami, Florida. On 12 February, ESPN reported that Postol suffered a fractured thumb and forced to drop out of the bout. Indongo was announced as his replacement, with the bout still taking place on 9 March, however the venue was changed to Deadwood Mountain Grand, a casino and resort in Deadwood, South Dakota, with Showtime televising the bout live. Prograis knocked Indongo down four times in the fight, dropping him once in round 1 and three more times in round 2 before referee Ian John Lewis stopped the fight at 2:54 of round 2. Indongo started the fight well before being hit with a hard jab that dropped him. Indongo was hurt with this shot. Indongo fought close to Prograis, which seemed to benefit Prograis. After the fight, Prograis told Showtime's Steve Farhood, "After the first round, I felt his punches. He couldn't punch. He couldn’t hurt me. I got a little reckless. But I got the job done, so I can’t complain." Prograis landed 46 of 94 punches thrown (49%) and Indongo connected on 32 of his 120 thrown (27%).

Indongo came back with a win against Carltavius Jones Johnson in his next fight. Indongo was controlling the action in round one. In round two, Jones Johnson fought more aggressively, but a counter right hook from Indongo dropped him on the canvas. Johnons managed to beat the count, but the referee decided he was not fit to continue, awarding Indongo with the TKO win.

On 27 November 2020, Indongo faced Daniyar Yeleussinov. Yeleussinov looked dominant and dropped Indongo in the opening round. It looked like the fight would end in the opening round, but Indongo managed to survive to the round. In the second round, Indongo was dropped again, and again managed to beat the count. He did not look fit to continue however, and the referee waved the fight off right after the knockdown.

== Professional boxing record ==
31 fights	24 wins	7 losses
By knockout	13	5
By decision	11	2

No.	Result	Record	Opponent	Type	Round, time	Date	Location	Notes
31	Loss	24–7	Khariton Agrba	KO	3 (8) 1:50	19 Nov 2022	RCC Boxing Academy, Ekaterinburg, Russia	
30	Loss	24–6	Mirzakamol Nematov	UD	8	15 Jul 2022	Hotel Renaissance, Tashkent, Uzbekistan	
29	Win	24–5	Sherif Kasongo	RTD	4 (8)	26 Feb 2022	Government Complex, Lusaka, Zambia	
28	Loss	23–5	Chris Jenkins	PTS	8	5 Feb 2022	Motorpoint Arena, Cardiff, Wales	
27	Loss	23–4	Hassan Mwakinyo	TKO	4 (12)	3 Sep 2021	Kilimanjaro Hall, Dar es Salaam, Tanzania	For African light-middleweight title
26	Loss	23–3	Daniyar Yeleussinov	TKO	2 (10), 0:30	27 Nov 2020	Seminole Hard Rock Hotel & Casino, Hollywood, Florida, US	For vacant IBF Inter-Continental welterweight title
25	Win	23–2	Tay Jones	TKO	2 (10), 1:12	3 Aug 2019	Bobby Miller Center, Tuscaloosa, Alabama, US	
24	Loss	22–2	Regis Prograis	TKO	2 (12), 2:54	9 Mar 2018	Mountain Grand, Deadwood, South Dakota, US	For vacant WBC interim light-welterweight title
23	Loss	22–1	Terence Crawford	KO	3 (12), 1:38	19 Aug 2017	Pinnacle Bank Arena, Lincoln, Nebraska, US	Lost WBA and IBF light-welterweight titles; For WBC, WBO, and The Ring light-welterweight titles
22	Win	22–0	Ricky Burns	UD	12	15 Apr 2017	The SSE Hydro, Glasgow, Scotland	Retained IBF and IBO light-welterweight titles; Won WBA light-welterweight title
21	Win	21–0	Eduard Troyanovsky	KO	1 (12), 0:40	3 Dec 2016	Megasport Arena, Moscow, Russia	Won IBF and IBO light-welterweight titles
20	Win	20–0	Fabian Lyimo	TKO	1 (12)	6 Aug 2016	Country Club Resort, Windhoek, Namibia	Retained WBO Africa light-welterweight title
19	Win	19–0	Allan Kamote	TKO	9 (12)	26 Mar 2016	Country Club Resort, Windhoek, Namibia	Retained WBO Africa light-welterweight title
18	Win	18–0	Zolani Marali	UD	12	3 Oct 2015	Country Club Resort, Windhoek, Namibia	Retained WBO Africa light-welterweight title
17	Win	17–0	Ibrahim Class	UD	12	20 Mar 2015	Ramatex Factory, Windhoek, Namibia	Retained WBO Africa light-welterweight title
16	Win	16–0	Kaizer Mabuza	UD	12	6 Dec 2014	Country Club Resort, Windhoek, Namibia	Retained WBO Africa light-welterweight title
15	Win	15–0	Ishmael Takudzwa Kuchocha	TKO	3 (12), 0:45	26 Jul 2014	Club Resort, Windhoek, Namibia	Retained WBO Africa light-welterweight title
14	Win	14–0	Joel Mwewa	KO	1 (12), 2:17	1 Mar 2014	Olufuko Centre, Outapi, Namibia	
13	Win	13–0	Nelson Banda	PTS	10	11 May 2013	Kuisebmond Community Hall, Walvis Bay, Namibia	
12	Win	12–0	Abias Silipumbwe	KO	1 (6), 1:25	20 Mar 2013	Country Club Resort, Windhoek, Namibia	
11	Win	11–0	James Onyango	TKO	2 (12), 0:29	12 Oct 2012	Country Club Resort, Windhoek, Namibia	Won vacant WBO Africa light-welterweight title
10	Win	10–0	Meshack Kondwani	TKO	4 (8), 2:02	20 Mar 2012	Country Club Resort, Windhoek, Namibia	
9	Win	9–0	Silas Mandeya	UD	6	5 Nov 2011	Country Club Resort, Windhoek, Namibia	
8	Win	8–0	Peter Malakia	TKO	10 (10)	11 Jun 2011	Country Club Resort, Windhoek, Namibia	Retained Namibian lightweight title
7	Win	7–0	Samuel Kapapu	UD	10	19 Mar 2011	Country Club Resort, Windhoek, Namibia	Won vacant Namibian lightweight title
6	Win	6–0	Lawrence Moyo	TKO	1 (4)	7 Aug 2010	Kuisebmond Community Hall, Walvis Bay, Namibia	
5	Win	5–0	Samuel Kapapu	UD	4	29 May 2010	Kalahari Sands Hotel, Windhoek, Namibia	
4	Win	4–0	Festus Nghidinwa	MD	4	20 Mar 2010	Country Club Resort, Windhoek, Namibia	
3	Win	3–0	Daniel Hosea	TKO	2 (4), 1:56	31 Oct 2009	Kuisebmond Community Hall, Walvis Bay, Namibia	
2	Win	2–0	Pohamba Mandume	UD	4	12 Sep 2009	Country Club Resort, Windhoek, Namibia	
1	Win	1–0	Pohamba Mandume	PTS	4	25 Jul 2009	Country Club Resort, Windhoek, Namibia	

Sporting positions
Regional boxing titles
Vacant Title last held by Martin Haikali	Namibian lightweight champion 19 March 2011 – January 2012; Vacated	Vacant Title next held by Samuel Kapapu
Vacant Title last held by Ebenezer Lantei Lamptey	WBO Africa light-welterweight champion 12 October 2012 – 3 December 2016; Vacated	Vacant Title next held by Marios Matamba
Minor world boxing titles
Preceded by Eduard Troyanovsky	IBO light-welterweight champion 3 December 2016 – 7 August 2017; Stripped	Vacant Title next held by Mohamed Mimoune
Major world boxing titles
Preceded by Eduard Troyanovsky	IBF light-welterweight champion 3 December 2016 – 19 August 2017	Succeeded by Terence Crawford
Preceded by Ricky Burns as Champion	WBA light-welterweight champion Unified title 15 April 2017 – 19 August 2017	Succeeded by Terence Crawford as Super champion
