= Andreas Evensen =

Norwegian boxer

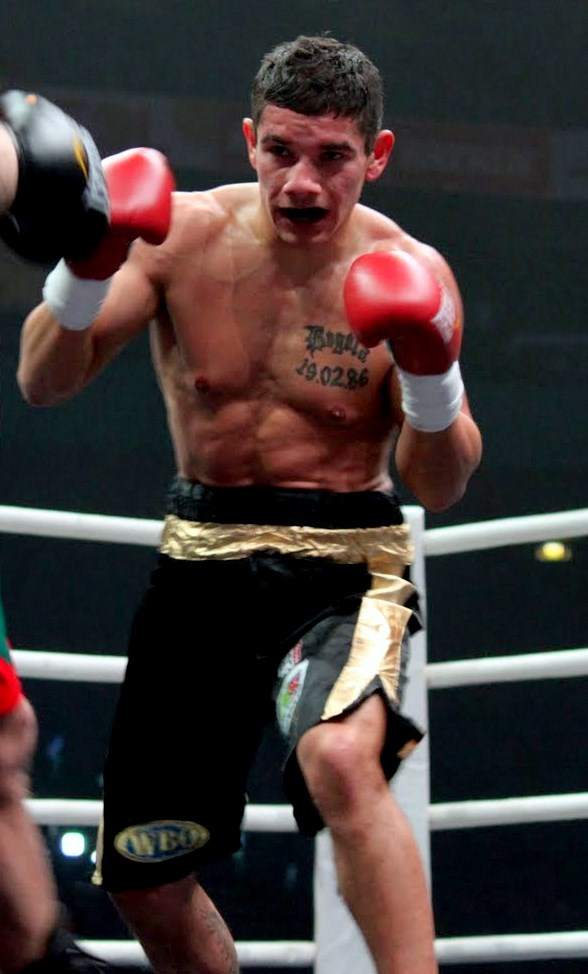
A Norwegian boxer, Andreas Evensen

Andreas Volden Evensen (born 19 February 1986) is a Norwegian professional boxer whose last 4 bouts have been on Sauerland Events Viasat Nordic Fight Night cards.

Evensen was born in Bogotá, Colombia. His trainer is Helge Wærøy.

In December 2010 in a title fight against Ricky Burns (in WBO's super-featherweight division), he lost by points, and in February, 2013, he was stopped in the final round while challenging for Alexander Miskirtchian's European title.

== Professional boxing record ==
17 Wins (6 knockouts, 11 decisions), 3 Losses (1 knockout, 2 decisions), 1 Draw
Res.	Record	Opponent	Type	Rd., Time	Date	Location	Notes
Loss	17-3-1	(Armenia) Alexander Miskirtchian	TKO	12	2013-02-09	Blue Water Dokken, Esbjerg, Denmark	For European Featherweight Title
Win	17-2-1	(France) Philippe Frenois	UD	10	2012-11-10	Ice Hall, Helsinki, Finland	
Win	16-2-1	(Republic of Ireland) Willie Casey	MD	12	2012-04-21	Arena Nord, Frederikshavn, Denmark	
Win	15-2-1	(Nicaragua) Julio Buitrago	UD	10	2012-02-18	Brøndby Hallen, Brøndby, Denmark	
Draw	14-2-1	(Spain) Sergio Prado	TD	3 (8)	2011-12-17	Ringside Gym, Leppavaara, Finland	
Win	14-2	(Bulgaria) Yordan Vasilev	TKO	3 (6)	2011-03-04	Hartwall Arena, Helsinki, Finland	
Loss	13-2	(United Kingdom) Ricky Burns	UD	12	2010-12-04	(United Kingdom) Braehead Arena, Glasgow, Scotland	For WBO Super Featherweight Title
Win	13-1	(Argentina) Jose Saez	TKO	6 (12)	2010-05-11	Varuboden Arena, Kirkkonummi, Finland	Defended WBO Inter-Continental Featherweight Title
Win	12-1	(Thailand) Payak Patanakan Gym	TKO	7 (12)	2010-03-26	Toolon Kisahalli, Helsinki, Finland	Won vacant WBO Inter-Continental Featherweight Title
Win	11-1	(Hungary) Mihaly Telekfi	TKO	2 (6)	2009-11-27	Pyynikin Palloiluhalli, Tampere, Finland	
Win	10-1	(Italy) Gianpiero Contestabile	TKO	5 (8)	2009-09-25	(United Kingdom) Manchester Velodrome, Manchester, England	
Win	9-1	(Russia) Andrey Kostin	UD	6	2009-04-18	Kisahalli, Helsinki, Finland	
Win	8-1	(Sweden) Rikard Lundby	MD	8	2008-06-21	Brøndby Hallen, Brøndby, Denmark	Won Nordic Featherweight Title
Win	7-1	(Ecuador) Alex Bone	UD	6	2008-02-01	Toolo Sports Hall, Helsinki, Finland	
Loss	6-1	(Canada) Benoit Gaudet	UD	8	2007-09-29	EWE-Arena, Oldenburg, Germany	
Win	6-0	(Armenia) Artak Alijan	PTS	6	2007-02-17	Complexe Sportif, Evere, Belgium	
Win	5-0	(Belgium) Pascal Bouchez	UD	6	2006-12-16	BigBox, Kempten, Germany	
Win	4-0	(Belgium) Younes Amrani	TKO	5 (6)	2006-11-04	RWE Rhein-Ruhr Sporthalle, Muelheim, Germany	
Win	3-0	(Belgium) Miloud Saadi	UD	4	2006-09-23	Rittal Arena, Wetzlar, Germany	
Win	2-0	(Slovakia) Stefan Berza	UD	6	2006-05-19	Infanta Cristina, Torrevieja, Spain	
Win	1-0	(Poland) Piotr Niesporek	UD	4	2006-03-25	TURM Erlebnis City, Oranienburg, Germany	Evensen's professional debut
