= Robbie Barrett =

British boxer

Personal information
- Nationality: British
- Born: England
- Height: 5 ft 10 in (178 cm)
- Weight: Lightweight

Boxing career
- Reach: 68 in (173 cm)
- Stance: Southpaw

Boxing record
- Total fights: 21
- Wins: 18
- Win by KO: 1
- Losses: 3
- Draws: 1

Robbie Barrett is a British former professional boxer who competed from 2012 to 2018. He held the British lightweight title in 2017.

== Professional career ==
Barrett made his professional debut on 2 March 2012, scoring a four-round points decision (PTS) victory over Kristian Laight at The Dome Leisure Centre in Doncaster.

In his eleventh fight, with a record of 7–2–1, he fought Brad Botham at The Dome Leisure Centre on 28 February 2015, winning the fight and vacant Central Area lightweight title via PTS over ten rounds.

On 22 October 2016, he defeated Marcus Ffrench at the Barclaycard Arena in Birmingham by unanimous decision (UD) to win the vacant English lightweight title. Two judges scored the bout 100–91 and the third scored it 98–92.

Two fights later, he challenged Scott Cardle for the British lightweight title on 15 April 2017 at The SSE Hydro in Glasgow. Barrett touched the canvas twice during the fight, once in round two and again in the fifth, but won the title via majority decision (MD), with two judges scoring the bout 115–113 and 114–112 in favour of Barrett, while the third scored it a draw with 114–114.

The first defence of his British title came on 7 October 2017 at the Manchester Arena against undefeated prospect Lewis Ritson, losing via seventh-round technical knockout (TKO). Ritson was the aggressor from the opening bell, backing Barrett up with combination punches. 13 seconds into round two, the champion was dropped heavily from a left hook and straight right hand. Barrett made it back to his feet and entered defensive mode as spent the rest of the round on the back foot while under constant pressure from Ritson's combination punches to the head and body. The next few rounds saw Ritson staying on the front foot, attacking in combinations, with Barrett having minimal success with the jab and straight right hands. In the first minute of the sixth, Barrett was dropped with a left hook to the body. After beating the count, he was dropped again just 7 seconds later from another body shot, this time a right hand. After rising to his feet for the referee's count of 8, Barrett had Ritson backed up against the ropes nearing the halfway point of the round, only for Ritson to spin the champion and turn the tables, unleashing heavy shots as Barrett's back was now against the ropes. In the final 30 seconds of the round, Barrett had some success with straight right hands as Ritson appeared to tire from the earlier onslaught. The first half of the seventh round was evenly contested with both fighters having success. In the second half, Ritson began landing clean punches to the head of Barrett. Ritson landed a left hook to the body of Barrett in the final minute and dropped the champion for the fourth time, causing referee Steve Gray to wave off the fight with 40 seconds remaining.

In his final professional fight, he fought Matty Fagan for the vacant IBF European lightweight title on 5 October 2018 at the Barnsley Metrodome, Barnsley. Barrett won via unanimous decision over ten rounds, with two judges scoring the bout 96–93 and the third scoring it 99–91.

On 5 March 2019, Barrett announced his retirement from boxing.

== Professional boxing record ==
| 21 fights | 17 wins | 3 losses |
|---|---|---|
| By knockout | 1 | 1 |
| By decision | 16 | 2 |
| Draws | 1 | |

| No. | Result | Record | Opponent | Type | Round, time | Date | Location | Notes |
|---|---|---|---|---|---|---|---|---|
| 21 | Win | 17–3–1 | Matty Fagan | UD | 10 | 5 Oct 2018 | Barnsley Metrodome, Barnsley, England | Won vacant IBF European lightweight title |
| 20 | Win | 16–3–1 | Jordan Ellison | PTS | 8 | 13 Apr 2018 | The Dome Leisure Centre, Doncaster, England | |
| 19 | Loss | 15–3–1 | Lewis Ritson | TKO | 8 (12), 2:27 | 7 Oct 2017 | Manchester Arena, Manchester, England | Lost British lightweight title |
| 18 | Win | 15–2–1 | Scott Cardle | MD | 12 | 15 Apr 2017 | The SSE Hydro, Glasgow, England | Won British lightweight title |
| 17 | Win | 14–2–1 | Kevin Hooper | UD | 10 | 4 Mar 2017 | The Dome Leisure Centre, Doncaster, England | Retained English lightweight title |
| 16 | Win | 13–2–1 | Marcus Ffrench | UD | 10 | 22 Oct 2016 | Barclaycard Arena, Birmingham, England | Won vacant English lightweight title |
| 15 | Win | 12–2–1 | Adam Kettleborough | TKO | 6 (8), 0:45 | 14 May 2016 | The Dome Leisure Centre, Doncaster, England | |
| 14 | Win | 11–2–1 | Sylwester Walczak | PTS | 4 | 13 Feb 2016 | Dearne Valley Leisure Centre, Denaby Main, England | |
| 13 | Win | 10–2–1 | Fonz Alexander | PTS | 4 | 20 Nov 2015 | Barnsley Metrodome, Barnsley, England | |
| 12 | Win | 9–2–1 | Ismail Anwar | PTS | 10 | 26 Jun 2015 | Barnsley Metrodome, Barnsley, England | Retained Central Area lightweight title |
| 11 | Win | 8–2–1 | Brad Botham | PTS | 10 | 28 Feb 2015 | The Dome Leisure Centre, Doncaster, England | Won vacant Central Area lightweight title |
| 10 | Win | 7–2–1 | Matt Seawright | PTS | 6 | 29 Nov 2014 | The Dome Leisure Centre, Doncaster, England | |
| 9 | Win | 6–2–1 | Jamie Zaszlos | PTS | 4 | 6 Sep 2014 | The Dome Leisure Centre, Doncaster, England | |
| 8 | Win | 5–2–1 | Graham Fearn | PTS | 4 | 8 Mar 2014 | The Dome Leisure Centre, Doncaster, England | |
| 7 | Loss | 4–2–1 | Andy Harris | PTS | 8 | 20 Sep 2013 | Barnsley Metrodome, Barnsley, England | |
| 6 | Win | 4–1–1 | Billy Smith | PTS | 6 | 6 Jul 2013 | The Dome Leisure Centre, Doncaster, England | |
| 5 | Loss | 3–1–1 | Ismail Anwar | PTS | 6 | 19 Apr 2013 | The Dome Leisure Centre, Doncaster, England | |
| 4 | Draw | 3–0–1 | Jamie Robinson | PTS | 4 | 1 Dec 2012 | The Dome Leisure Centre, Doncaster, England | |
| 3 | Win | 3–0 | Sid Razak | PTS | 4 | 1 Sep 2012 | The Dome Leisure Centre, Doncaster, England | |
| 2 | Win | 2–0 | Steve Martin | PTS | 4 | 27 Apr 2012 | Barnsley Metrodome, Barnsley, England | |
| 1 | Win | 1–0 | Kristian Laight | PTS | 4 | 2 Mar 2012 | The Dome Leisure Centre, Doncaster, England | |

Sporting positions
Regional boxing titles
| Vacant Title last held by Scott Cardle | Central Area lightweight champion 28 February 2015 – September 2016; Vacated | Vacant Title next held by Josh Morgan |
| Vacant Title last held by Ohara Davies | English lightweight champion 22 October 2016 – March 2017; Vacated | Vacant Title next held by Lee Appleyard |
| Preceded by Scott Cardle | British lightweight champion 15 April 2017 – 7 October 2017 | Succeeded by Lewis Ritson |
| Vacant Title last held by Paul Hyland Jr. | IBF European lightweight champion 5 October 2018 – 5 March 2019; Retired | Vacant |
