= Craig Evans (boxer) =

Welsh boxer (born 1989)

Personal information
- Born: 18 September 1989 (age 36) Blackwood, Wales
- Height: 5 ft 8 in (173 cm)
- Weight: Super-featherweight; Lightweight

Boxing career
- Stance: Southpaw

Boxing record
- Total fights: 25
- Wins: 20
- Win by KO: 3
- Losses: 3
- Draws: 2

Craig Anthony Evans (born 18 September 1989) is a Welsh professional boxer who challenged for the British lightweight title in 2015.

== Professional career ==
Evans made his professional debut on 15 May 2010, scoring a first-round technical knockout (TKO) over Dan Carr at Upton Park in London, England.

After winning his first 14 fights, three by stoppage, he fought Scott Cardle for the vacant British lightweight title on 30 May 2015 at The O2 Arena in London. The bout was part of the undercard of Kell Brook's IBF world title defence against Frankie Gavin. Evans suffered the first defeat of his career via unanimous decision (UD), with all three judges scoring the bout 116–112.

Following defeat to Cardle, he faced 2012 Olympian Tom Stalker for the vacant WBO European lightweight title on 10 October 2015 at the Manchester Arena. The bout was scored a split draw (SD), with one judge scoring it 96–94 in favour of Evans, another scoring it 97–93 to Stalker while the third judge scored it even at 95–95. The pair had a rematch two months later on 19 December at the same venue, again for the vacant WBO European title. The bout was once again scored a SD, with one judge scoring it 96–94 for Evans, another scoring it 96–94 for Stalker and the third scoring it even at 95–95. After securing a points decision (PTS) victory against Jordan Ellison in July 2016, Evans and Stalker agreed to settle the score once and for all in a trilogy fight on 26 November 2016 at the Motorpoint Arena in Cardiff, Wales, with the WBO European title being on the line yet again, although this time the title was in Stalker's possession. Evans defeated Stalker via majority decision (MD) to capture his first professional title. Two judges scored the bout 98–92 and 96–94 in favour of Evans, while the third scored it even at 95–95.

He successfully defended his title against Stephen Ormond in June 2017 before facing undefeated Roman Andreev on 3 February 2018 at the Bolshoy Ice Dome in Sochi, Russia. Evans suffered the second defeat of his career, losing his WBO European title via ninth-round TKO. At the time of the stoppage, Evans was ahead on all three judges' scorecards with 77–75 and 76–75 twice.

He bounced back from defeat with a PTS victory in a rematch with Jordan Ellison in September 2018 before challenging for the vacant WBO European title once again, this time against Boy Jones Jr. on 19 November 2018 at the Hilton Hotel in London. Evans captured the title for a second time, defeating Jones Jr. via UD. One judge scored the bout 98–92 and the other two scored it 97–93. He successfully defended the title in a rematch with Stephen Ormond in June 2019, before facing James Tennyson five months later in a non-title fight on 23 November at the M&S Bank Arena (formerly Echo Arena) in Liverpool. Evans was dropped in the first round en route to an eleventh-round TKO defeat.

== Professional boxing record ==
25 fights	20 wins	3 losses
By knockout	3	2
By decision	17	1
Draws	2	

No.	Result	Record	Opponent	Type	Round, time	Date	Location	Notes
25	Loss	20–3–2	James Tennyson	TKO	11 (12), 2:00	23 Nov 2019	M&S Bank Arena, Liverpool, England	
24	Win	20–2–2	Stephen Ormond	UD	10	2 Jun 2019	Vale Sports Arena, Cardiff, Wales	Retained WBO European lightweight title
23	Win	19–2–2	Boy Jones Jr.	UD	10	19 Nov 2018	Hilton Hotel, London, England	Won vacant WBO European lightweight title
22	Win	18–2–2	Jordan Ellison	PTS	6	7 Sep 2018	Vale Sports Arena, Cardiff, Wales	
21	Loss	17–2–2	Roman Andreev	TKO	9 (12), 1:19	3 Feb 2018	Bolshoy Ice Dome, Sochi, Russia	Lost WBO European lightweight title
20	Win	17–1–2	Stephen Ormond	UD	10	17 Jun 2017	Waterfront Hall, Belfast, Northern Ireland	Retained WBO European lightweight title
19	Win	16–1–2	Tom Stalker	MD	10	26 Nov 2016	Motorpoint Arena, Cardiff, Wales	Won WBO European lightweight title
18	Win	15–1–2	Jordan Ellison	PTS	8	16 Jul 2016	Ice Arena, Cardiff, Wales	
17	Draw	14–1–2	Tom Stalker	SD	10	19 Dec 2015	Manchester Arena, Manchester, England	For vacant WBO European lightweight title
16	Draw	14–1–1	Tom Stalker	SD	10	10 Oct 2015	Manchester Arena, Manchester, England	For vacant WBO European lightweight title
15	Loss	14–1	Scott Cardle	UD	12	30 May 2015	The O2 Arena, London, England	For vacant British lightweight title
14	Win	14–0	Jacek Wylezol	PTS	8	14 Feb 2015	Civic Hall, Wolverhampton, England	
13	Win	13–0	Ronnie Clark	PTS	10	24 Nov 2014	Hilton Hotel, London, England	
12	Win	12–0	Dame Seck	PTS	8	10 May 2014	Olympia, Liverpool, England	
11	Win	11–0	Andoni Alonso	PTS	8	7 Dec 2013	Echo Arena, Liverpool, England	
10	Win	10–0	Youssef al-Hamidi	PTS	8	17 Aug 2013	Motorpoint Arena, Cardiff, Wales	
9	Win	9–0	Billy Smith	PTS	4	31 May 2013	Town Hall, Walsall, England	
8	Win	8–0	Ideh Ochuko	PTS	6	1 Nov 2012	York Hall, London, England	
7	Win	7–0	Dougie Curran	RTD	1 (6), 2:21	25 May 2012	Newport Centre, Newport, Wales	
6	Win	6–0	Marc Callaghan	RTD	1 (6), 3:00	25 Feb 2012	Motorpoint Arena, Cardiff, Wales	
5	Win	5–0	Ibrar Riyaz	PTS	6	15 Oct 2011	Echo Arena, Liverpool, England	
4	Win	4–0	Scott Moises	TD	5 (6)	16 Jul 2011	Echo Arena, Liverpool, England	TD after Moises injured from accidental head clash
3	Win	3–0	Sid Razak	PTS	4	12 Mar 2011	Braehead Arena, Glasgow, Scotland	
2	Win	2–0	Paddy McGarrity	PTS	4	4 Dec 2010	Braehead Arena, Glasgow, Scotland	
1	Win	1–0	Dan Carr	TKO	1 (4), 0:39	15 May 2010	Upton Park, London, England	
