= Mike Reed (boxer) =

American boxer (born 1993)

Personal information
- Nickname: Yes Indeed
- Nationality: American
- Born: Michael Delonte Reed; January 12, 1993 (age 33) Washington, D.C., U.S.
- Height: 5 ft 6 in (168 cm)
- Weight: Light welterweight; Welterweight
- Website: www.YesIndeedReed.com

Boxing career
- Reach: 66 in (168 cm)
- Stance: Southpaw

Boxing record
- Total fights: 27
- Wins: 25
- Win by KO: 13
- Losses: 2

Michael Delonte Reed (born January 12, 1993) is an American professional boxer.

== Amateur career ==
Reed won the 2005 National Silver Gloves Championship, the 2009 U.S. Junior National Championship, and the 2011 National Golden Gloves Championship. He finished second at the 2010 U.S. National Championships, third at the 2010 National PAL Championships, and fourth at the 2011 U.S. National Championships. He was named the 2011 Amateur Boxer of the Year by boxing website Stiff Jab. Reed finished his amateur career with a record of 90–13.

== Professional career ==
Reed made his professional debut on March 2, 2013, scoring a first-round technical knockout (TKO) victory over Kareem McFarland at the Rosecroft Raceway in Fort Washington, Maryland. He secured five more victories in 2013; a knockout (KO) over Cassius Clay in April; DeMarcus Rogers by unanimous decision (UD) in June; stoppages over Roberto Lopez in July and Ramesis Gil in September; and a UD against Randy Fuentes in October.

He fought four times in the first half of 2014, scoring wins over Jorge Marquez by TKO in January; Bilal Mahasin by UD in March; Regino Canales by corner retirement (RTD) in April; and Alberto Morales by UD in June. A month after his win over Morales, it was announced that Reed had signed a promotional deal with Bob Arum's Top Rank. He finished the year with UD wins against Osnel Charles in October and Oscar Valenzuela in November.

He began 2015 with TKO wins over Edgardo Soto in March and Osenohan Vazquez in May, followed by a UD victory against Luis Joel Gonzalez in June. Reed ended the year with TKO wins over Antonio Canas in September and Rondale Hubbert in November.

He secured four more wins in 2016; Samuel Amoako by UD in March; TKOs over Abraham Cordero in June and Aaron Herrera in October; and a UD against Sidney Siqueira in December.

Following two UD victories in 2017 – against Reyes Sanchez in April and Robert Franckel in August – Reed challenged for his first professional championship, the WBC Continental Americas super lightweight title, against undefeated future unified world champion José Ramírez. The bout took place on November 11, 2017, at the Save Mart Center in Fresno, California. Reed suffered the first defeat of his professional career via second-round KO.

He only fought once in 2018, suffering the second loss of his career to Arnold Barboza Jr. via UD over ten rounds. Reed bounced back in 2019 with two victories; a KO over Yardley Armenta Cruz in April and a UD against Angel Hernandez in June.

== Professional boxing record ==
27 fights	25 wins	2 losses
By knockout	13	1
By decision	12	1

No.	Result	Record	Opponent	Type	Round, time	Date	Location	Notes
27	Win	25–2	(United States) Angel Herndandez	UD	8	Jun 20, 2019	(United States) Ocean Resort Casino, Atlantic City, New Jersey, U.S.	
26	Win	24–2	(Mexico) Yardley Armenta Cruz	KO	2 (6), 1:45	Apr 25, 2019	(United States) Fantasy Springs Casino, Indio, California, U.S.	
25	Loss	23–2	(United States) Arnold Barboza Jr.	UD	10	Mar 10, 2018	(United States) StubHub Center, Carson, California, U.S.	
24	Loss	23–1	(United States) José Ramírez	KO	2 (10), 1:43	Nov 11, 2017	(United States) Save Mart Center, Fresno, California, U.S.	For WBC Continental Americas super lightweight title
23	Win	23–0	(United States) Robert Franckel	UD	10	Aug 19, 2017	(United States) Pinnacle Bank Arena, Omaha, Nebraska, U.S.	
22	Win	22–0	(Mexico) Reyes Sanchez	UD	10	Apr 8, 2017	(United States) MGM National Harbor, Oxon Hill, Maryland, U.S.	
21	Win	21–0	(Brazil) Sidney Siqueira	UD	8	Dec 10, 2016	(United States) CenturyLink Center, Omaha, Nebraska, U.S.	
20	Win	20–0	(Mexico) Aaron Herrera	TKO	6 (8), 3:00	Oct 14, 2016	(United States) 2300 Arena, Philadelphia, Pennsylvania, U.S.	
19	Win	19–0	(Mexico) Abraham Cordero	TKO	6 (8), 2:29	Jun 11, 2016	(United States) The Theater at Madison Square Garden, New York City, New York, U.S.	
18	Win	18–0	(Ghana) Samuel Amoaka	UD	6	Mar 18, 2016	(United States) 2300 Arena, Philadelphia, Pennsylvania, U.S.	
17	Win	17–0	(United States) Rondale Hubbert	TKO	7 (8), 1:09	Nov 7, 2015	(United States) Thomas & Mack Center, Las Vegas, Nevada, U.S.	
16	Win	16–0	(United States) Antonio Canas	TKO	5 (8), 1:28	Sep 11, 2015	(United States) Cosmopolitan of Las Vegas, Las Vegas, Nevada, U.S.	
15	Win	15–0	(Puerto Rico) Luis Joel Gonzalez	UD	8	Jun 13, 2015	(United States) The Theater at Madison Square Garden, New York City, New York, U.S.	
14	Win	14–0	(Puerto Rico) Osenohan Vazquez	TKO	2 (8), 2:00	May 8, 2015	(United States) Prudential Center, Newark, New Jersey, U.S.	
13	Win	13–0	(Puerto Rico) Edgardo Soto	TKO	2 (8), 2:10	Mar 14, 2015	(United States) Sphinx Club, Washington, D.C., U.S.	
12	Win	12–0	(Mexico) Oscar Valenzuela	UD	8	Nov 29, 2014	(United States) CenturyLink Center, Omaha, Nebraska, U.S.	
11	Win	11–0	(United States) Osnel Charles	UD	6	Oct 4, 2014	(United States) Bally's Atlantic City, Atlantic City, New Jersey, U.S.	
10	Win	10–0	(Nicaragua) Alberto Morales	UD	6	Jun 14, 2014	(United States) Bally's Atlantic City, Atlantic City, New Jersey, U.S.	
9	Win	9–0	(Puerto Rico) Regino Canales	RTD	4 (6), 3:00	Apr 18, 2014	(United States) Rosecroft Raceway, Fort Washington, Maryland, U.S.	
8	Win	8–0	(United States) Bilal Mahasin	UD	6	Mar 7, 2014	(United States) Rosecroft Raceway, Fort Washington, Maryland, U.S.	
7	Win	7–0	(United States) Jorge Marquez	TKO	5 (6), 2:34	Jan 17, 2014	(United States) Rosecroft Raceway, Fort Washington, Maryland, U.S.	
6	Win	6–0	(United States) Randy Fuentes	UD	6	Oct 18, 2013	(United States) Rosecroft Raceway, Fort Washington, Maryland, U.S.	
5	Win	5–0	(Dominican Republic) Ramesis Gil	KO	6 (6), 1:23	Sep 7, 2013	(United States) Rosecroft Raceway, Fort Washington, Maryland, U.S.	
4	Win	4–0	(United States) Roberto Lopez	TKO	3 (4), 2:40	Jul 13, 2013	(United States) Rosecroft Raceway, Fort Washington, Maryland, U.S.	
3	Win	3–0	(United States) DeMarcus Rogers	UD	4	Jun 15, 2013	(United States) Walter E. Washington Convention Center, Washington, D.C., U.S.	
2	Win	2–0	(United States) Cassius Clay	KO	1 (4), 0:41	Apr 20, 2013	(United States) The Show Place Arena, Upper Malboro, Maryland, U.S.	
1	Win	1–0	(United States) Kareem McFarland	TKO	1 (4), 2:43	Mar 2, 2013	(United States) Rosecroft Raceway, Fort Washington, Maryland, U.S.	
