= Lewis Ritson =

British boxer (born 1993)

Personal information
- Nickname: The Sandman
- Nationality: British
- Born: Lewis David Ritson; 22 September 1993 (age 33) Forest Hall, Newcastle upon Tyne, England
- Height: 5 ft 10 in (178 cm)
- Weight: Lightweight; Light-welterweight

Boxing career
- Reach: 83.5 in (212 cm)
- Stance: Orthodox

Boxing record
- Total fights: 28
- Wins: 23
- Win by KO: 13
- Losses: 5

Lewis David Ritson (born 22 September 1993) is a British professional boxer. At regional level, he held the British lightweight title from 2017 to 2018, and challenged once for the European lightweight title in 2018.

== Amateur career ==
Ritson first started boxing at the age of eight. He was an England international at amateur level and a dual title winner of the TTW belts at 67 kg and 71 kg respectively. Ritson had 97 amateur fights in total and was also an ABA Seniors finalist.

== Professional career ==
=== Early career ===
Ritson made his professional boxing debut in April 2015 with a points win over Kristian Laight at the Metro Radio Arena in Newcastle. He went on to box a further six times throughout the remainder of the year, winning all six; two by knockout. Ritson won all five of his fights in 2016, culminating in him securing the BBBofC Northern Area lightweight title with a seventh-round knockout win over Jordan Ellison on 3 December 2016. As a result of his early performances as a professional, Ritson received interest from promoters Eddie Hearn, Barry McGuigan and Frank Warren.

=== British lightweight champion ===
==== Ritson vs. Barrett ====
Having spent the first two years of his professional boxing career competing largely on small hall shows, Ritson fought live on Sky Sports for the first time on the undercard for Anthony Crolla–Ricky Burns at the Manchester Arena on 7 October 2017. He defeated Robbie Barrett by way of TKO in the seventh round having dropped Barrett on four occasions, in doing so winning the British lightweight title. Just three days after the fight, on 10 October 2017, he signed a promotional deal with Matchroom Boxing, with Ritson highlighting his next goal to successfully defend the title three times and consequently win the Lonsdale Belt outright.

==== Ritson vs. Murray ====
Ritson's first defence of his British title was pencilled in when he answered Joe Murray's challenge, with the pair headlining the Sky Sports NXTGEN bill in Manchester on 25 February 2018. Ritson won the bout courtesy of a "whirlwind stoppage victory" in the first round and afterwards discussed the possibility of fighting former British lightweight champion Scott Cardle, who was watching ringside.

==== Ritson vs. Cardle ====
Cardle was subsequently named as Ritson's next opponent on the Dillian Whyte–Lucas Browne undercard at The O2 Arena on 24 March 2018. Ahead of the fight, Ritson stated "I've been on small hall shows in the past and now I'm headlining on Sky Sports and heading to The O2 on a big show – it's amazing and I'm working hard to make sure that this is just the beginning". Ritson successfully retained his British lightweight title with a second round stoppage victory over Cardle.

==== Ritson vs. Hyland Jnr ====
He was then matched to defend his British lightweight title against unbeaten Northern Irish boxer Paul Hyland Jnr, co-headlining the Sky Sports event at the Metro Radio Arena in his home city of Newcastle on 16 June 2018. Ritson won the fight courtesy of a first round stoppage having knocked Hyland Jnr down three times in the opening round. The win meant that he secured the British lightweight belt outright. Four days after the fight, Ritson signed a new five-fight deal with Matchroom Boxing.

"Lewis Ritson has fast become one of the most popular and exciting fighters in British boxing and now he gets an opportunity to challenge for a European title. He has cleared up domestically and this is the next step."

— Promotor Eddie Hearn on Ritson's challenge for the vacant European lightweight title.

=== European lightweight challenge ===
==== Ritson vs. Amador ====
Matchroom Boxing announced that Ritson would headline a card at the Metro Radio Arena in Newcastle in October 2018, where he would challenge for the European lightweight title. His opponent was revealed as former titleholder Francesco Patera on 28 August 2018, with the two competing for the vacant title. Before challenging for the European title, Ritson would first appear on the Amir Khan undercard at the Arena Birmingham on 8 September 2018, in an eight-round "warm-up fight" that was made in the hope Ritson would get some rounds under his belt having fought for a total of four rounds over the course of the previous year. Ritson knocked out Nicaraguan boxer Oscar Amador following a body shot at the beginning of round three of the bout.

==== Ritson vs. Patera ====
Ritson lost to Patera by split decision on 13 October 2018. Two judges scored the fight 116–112, 116–112 for Patera, and the remaining judge scored it 116–112 in Ritson's favour. Following the defeat, Ritson stated a body shot in the fifth round hurt him and that he did not fully recover for the remainder of the fight.

=== Move to light welterweight ===
==== Ritson vs. Benitez ====
Ritson was initially meant to defend his British lightweight title against Andy Townend at the Copper Box Arena in London on 23 March 2019. It was then stated that Ritson would be vacating his British lightweight title and moving up a weight division to light welterweight, fighting Argentina's German Argentino Benitez for the WBA Inter-Continental super-lightweight title. On his move up to light welterweight, Ritson stated "now is the right time to move up to 140lbs. I probably should have moved up in weight a while ago but I was determined to test myself on the European scene which is why I carried on." Ritson defeated Benitez by unanimous decision over ten rounds.

==== Ritson vs. Jedrzejewski ====
Ritson defended his WBA Inter-Continental light welterweight title against Polish challenger Marek Jedrzejewski on 2 August 2019. The referee called a stop to the one-sided bout at 2:50 of the 3rd round. This win set up a fight with Robbie Davies Jr. on 19 October.

==== Ritson vs. Ponce ====
On 12 June 2021 Riston faced Jeremias Ponce in a IBF Super-Lightweight World Title eliminator fight. Ponce was ranked #5 by the IBF at super lightweight. Ritson was dominated in the fight and was eventually knocked down three times in the fight, which ended with a tenth round stoppage loss.

==== Ritson vs. Zlaticanin ====
Ritson beat Dejan Zlaticanin by unanimous decision in their 10 round contest on 25 March 2022 at Newcastle Arena in Tyne and Wear. The scorecards read 100-90, 100-90, 99-91 in favor of Ritson.

==== Ritson vs. Walker ====
Ritson lost to Conah Walker by unanimous at Resorts World Arena in Birmingham, England, on 30 November 2024.

== Personal life ==
Ritson is a Newcastle United supporter and wears the club's black and white stripes on his customary shorts. He walks to the ring to Geordie folk song Blaydon Races.

== Professional boxing record ==
28 fights	23 wins	5 losses
By knockout	13	3
By decision	10	2

No.	Result	Record	Opponent	Type	Round, time	Date	Location	Notes
28	Loss	23–5	Conah Walker	UD	10	30 Nov 2024	Resorts World Arena, Birmingham, England	
27	Loss	23–4	Paddy Donovan	TKO	9 (10), 0:32	25 May 2024	First Direct Arena, Leeds, England	
26	Loss	23–3	Ohara Davies	KO	9 (12), 2:23	4 Mar 2023	Newcastle Arena, Newcastle, England	
25	Win	23–2	Dejan Zlatičanin	UD	10	25 Mar 2022	Newcastle Arena, Newcastle, England	
24	Win	22–2	Christian Uruzquieta	RTD	9 (10), 3:00	18 Dec 2021	Rainton Meadows Arena, Houghton-le-Spring, England	
23	Loss	21–2	Jeremias Ponce	TKO	10 (12), 1:24	12 Jun 2021	Vertu Motors Arena, Newcastle, England	
22	Win	21–1	Miguel Vázquez	SD	12	17 Oct 2020	East of England Arena, Peterborough, England	Won vacant WBA Inter-Continental super-lightweight title
21	Win	20–1	Robbie Davies Jr.	UD	12	19 Oct 2019	Utilita Arena, Newcastle, England	
20	Win	19–1	Marek Jedrzejewski	TKO	3 (10), 2:50	2 Aug 2019	Exhibition Centre, Liverpool, England	Retained WBA Inter-Continental super-lightweight title
19	Win	18–1	German Argentino Benitez	UD	10	23 Mar 2019	Copper Box Arena, London, England	Won vacant WBA Inter-Continental super-lightweight title
18	Loss	17–1	Francesco Patera	SD	12	13 Oct 2018	Metro Radio Arena, Newcastle, England	For vacant European lightweight title
17	Win	17–0	Oscar Amador	KO	3 (8), 0:36	8 Sep 2018	Arena Birmingham, Birmingham, England	
16	Win	16–0	Paul Hyland Jnr	TKO	1 (12), 2:53	16 Jun 2018	Metro Radio Arena, Newcastle, England	Retained British lightweight title
15	Win	15–0	Scott Cardle	TKO	2 (12), 2:05	24 Mar 2018	The O2 Arena, London, England	Retained British lightweight title
14	Win	14–0	Joe Murray	TKO	1 (12), 1:55	25 Feb 2018	Victoria Warehouse Hotel, Manchester, England	Retained British lightweight title
13	Win	13–0	Robbie Barrett	TKO	7 (12), 2:27	7 Oct 2017	Manchester Arena, Manchester, England	Won British lightweight title
12	Win	12–0	Jordan Ellison	KO	7 (10), 1:35	3 Dec 2016	Rainton Meadows Arena, Houghton-le-Spring, England	Won vacant Northern Area lightweight title
11	Win	11–0	James Gorman	RTD	4 (6), 3:00	8 Oct 2016	Ashington Leisure Centre, Ashington, England	
10	Win	10–0	Nathan Hardy	TKO	2 (6), 3:00	10 Jul 2016	Stadium of Light, Sunderland, England	
9	Win	9–0	Bence Molnar	UD	10	26 Mar 2016	Bellahouston Leisure Centre, Glasgow, Scotland	Won vacant WBC Silver Youth lightweight title
8	Win	8–0	Daniel Bazo	RTD	3 (6), 3:00	30 Jan 2016	Marriott Hotel, Glasgow, Scotland	
7	Win	7–0	Mikhail Avakian	TKO	4 (10), 2:14	27 Nov 2015	Bellahouston Leisure Centre, Glasgow, Scotland	
6	Win	6–0	Youssef al-Hamidi	PTS	4	20 Nov 2015	Rainton Meadows Arena, Houghton-le-Spring, England	
5	Win	5–0	Jordan Ellison	PTS	6	19 Sep 2015	Lancastrian Suite, Gateshead, England	
4	Win	4–0	Simas Volosinas	PTS	4	5 Jul 2015	Stadium of Light, Sunderland, England	
3	Win	3–0	Chris Adaway	KO	1 (6)	4 Jun 2015	Radisson Blu Hotel, Glasgow, Scotland	
2	Win	2–0	Janis Puksins	PTS	4	8 May 2015	Borough Hall, Hartlepool, England	
1	Win	1–0	Kristian Laight	PTS	4	4 Apr 2015	Metro Radio Arena, Newcastle, England	
