= Scott Cardle =

British champion boxer (born 1989)

Personal information
- Born: 28 September 1989 (age 36) Blackpool, Lancashire, England
- Weight: Lightweight; Light-welterweight
- Website: www.scottycardle.co.uk

Boxing career
- Stance: Orthodox

Boxing record
- Total fights: 27
- Wins: 23
- Win by KO: 7
- Losses: 3
- Draws: 1
Medal record
Men's amateur boxing
Representing England
EU Championships
Bronze medal – third place	2009 Odense	Welterweight

Scott Cardle (born 28 September 1989) is an English former professional boxer who competed from 2012 to 2018. He held the British lightweight title from 2015 to 2016. As an amateur, he won a bronze medal in the welterweight division at the 2009 EU Championships.

== Amateur career ==
Born in Blackpool, Lancashire, to Glasgow-born parents, Cardle had a successful amateur career fighting out of Kirkham ABC, As well as 7 national gold medals from the age of 14, Scott became an England and Team GB International, winning many international honours including gold medal in multi nation tournament in Dublin, Ireland in three consecutive years (2007, 2008 & 2009), Gold at 'Golden Gong Cup' tournament in Macedonia (2008), a bronze medal at a multi nation tournament in Germany (2008) beating Jeff Horn, a bronze medal at the 2009 European Union Amateur Boxing Championships at welterweight, he then dropped down a weight to light-welterweight for the AIBA World Boxing Championships in Milan in 2009 After beating Olympic Bronze Medalist, Frenchman, Alexis Vastine, he then lost to another Olympic Bronze Medallist, Cuban, Roniel Iglesias Sotolongo missing the chance to secure a world championship medal.

== Professional boxing career ==
Trained by Joe Gallagher in Bolton, Cardle made his professional debut in March 2012 with a points win over journeyman Sid Razak. He had seven more fights that year, winning them all. In April 2013, he beat Maxi Hughes unanimously to win the Central Area lightweight title. Wins over Gary Fox, Krzysztof Szot, and Paul Appleby preceded a challenge for the English title in September 2014 against defending champion Kirk Goodings, the fight also an eliminator for the British title. Cardle stopped Goodings in 35 seconds in the first round to take the title.

In May 2015 Cardle met Craig Evans at The O2 Arena for the vacant British title. The fight went the distance, with both fighters suffering cuts, Cardle took a unanimous decision to become British champion. He was due to make his first defence of the title in September 2015 against Gary Buckland but a quadriceps tear sustained in sparring ruled him out of the fight, and he went on to make his first defence in November at the Echo Arena, Liverpool, against Sean Dodd. Despite sustaining cuts above both eyes after a tough eleven rounds, Cardle stopped Dodd in the twelfth and final round to retain the title."Scott Cardle vows to improve" The stoppage was controversial, and Cardle agreed to a rematch with Dodd in 2016 which ended in a draw. Cardle then defended his Lonsdale belt in Glasgow against mandatory challenger, Grimsby's Kevin Hooper. Cardle stopped Hooper in the sixth round to retain the belt.

Cardle then lost his British lightweight title to Robbie Barrett on 15 April 2017. Barrett won by majority decision, the judges scorecards reading 114–114, 112–114 and 113–115. Cardle eventually got another crack at the title, losing to Newcastle's Lewis Ritson by stoppage in the third round. In 2019, after losing to three time, three weight world champion, Ricky Burns in November 2018, Cardle retired from the sport.

== Personal life ==
A fan of Celtic F.C., Cardle got to play for the club in September 2015 in a charity match in honour of Jock Stein against Dunfermline Athletic F.C. His elder brother, Joe, was a professional footballer.

== Professional boxing record ==
27 fights	23 wins	3 losses
By knockout	7	2
By decision	16	1
Draws	1	

No.	Result	Record	Opponent	Type	Round, time	Date	Location	Notes
27	Loss	23–3–1	Ricky Burns	TKO	3 (10), 2:06	10 Nov 2018	Manchester Arena, Manchester, England	
26	Win	23–2–1	Michael Mooney	PTS	6	4 Aug 2018	Ice Arena Wales, Cardiff, Wales	
25	Loss	22–2–1	Lewis Ritson	TKO	2 (12), 2:05	24 Mar 2018	The O2 Arena, London, England	For British lightweight title
24	Win	22–1–1	Lee Connelly	PTS	6	7 Oct 2017	Manchester Arena, Manchester, England	
23	Loss	21–1–1	Robbie Barrett	MD	12	15 Apr 2017	SSE Hydro, Glasgow, Scotland	Lost British lightweight title
22	Win	21–0–1	Kevin Hooper	TKO	6 (12), 1:53	7 Oct 2016	SSE Hydro, Glasgow, Scotland	Retained British lightweight title
21	Win	20–0–1	Ivan Njegac	PTS	6	28 May 2016	SSE Hydro, Glasgow, Scotland	
20	Draw	19–0–1	Sean Dodd	MD	12	2 Apr 2016	Echo Arena, Liverpool, England	Retained British lightweight title
19	Win	19–0	Sean Dodd	TKO	12 (12), 1:58	7 Nov 2015	Echo Arena, Liverpool, England	Retained British lightweight title
18	Win	18–0	Craig Evans	UD	12	30 May 2015	The O2 Arena, London, England	Won vacant British lightweight title
17	Win	17–0	Yordan Vasilev	TKO	1 (4), 0:36	14 Feb 2015	Winter Gardens, Blackpool, England	
16	Win	16–0	Kirk Goodings	TKO	1 (10), 0:46	13 Sep 2014	Phones 4u Arena, Manchester, England	Won English lightweight title
15	Win	15–0	Sylvain Chapelle	PTS	8	27 Jun 2014	Braehead Arena, Glasgow, Scotland	
14	Win	14–0	Paul Appleby	TKO	8 (8), 1:17	1 Mar 2014	Scottish Exhibition Centre, Glasgow, Scotland	
13	Win	13–0	Krzysztof Szot	PTS	6	23 Nov 2013	Phones 4u Arena, Manchester, England	
12	Win	12–0	Gary Fox	PTS	8	7 Sep 2013	Scottish Exhibition Centre, Glasgow, Scotland	
11	Win	11–0	Maxi Hughes	PTS	10	20 Apr 2013	Winter Gardens, Blackpool, England	Won vacant Central Area lightweight title
10	Win	10–0	Yves Mesny	PTS	4	30 Mar 2013	Echo Arena, Liverpool, England	
9	Win	9–0	Maycol Cuevas	PTS	6	22 Feb 2013	Magna Centre, Rotherham, England	
8	Win	8–0	Miguel Aguilar	PTS	8	17 Nov 2012	Capital FM Arena, Nottingham, England	
7	Win	7–0	Karim Aliliche	PTS	6	20 Oct 2012	Sheffield Arena, Sheffield, England	
6	Win	6–0	Luis Garcia	TKO	2 (6), 2:11	5 Oct 2012	Winter Gardens, Blackpool, England	
5	Win	5–0	Francis Maina	PTS	4	22 Sep 2012	Odyssey Centre, Belfast, Northern Ireland	
4	Win	4–0	Karoly Lakatos	TKO	2 (6), 3:00	7 Jul 2012	Sheffield Arena, Sheffield, England	
3	Win	3–0	Ideh Ochuko	PTS	6	26 May 2012	Capital FM Arena, Nottingham, England	
2	Win	2–0	Johnny Greaves	PTS	4	27 Apr 2012	Echo Arena, Liverpool, England	
1	Win	1–0	Sid Razak	PTS	4	17 Mar 2012	Sheffield Arena, Sheffield, England	
