= Arnold Barboza Jr. =

American boxer (born 1991)

Personal information
- Born: December 9, 1991 (age 34) Long Beach, California, U.S.
- Height: 5 ft 9 in (175 cm)
- Weight: Light welterweight; Welterweight

Boxing career
- Reach: 72 in (183 cm)
- Stance: Orthodox

Boxing record
- Total fights: 34
- Wins: 33
- Win by KO: 11
- Losses: 1

Arnold Barboza Jr. (born December 9, 1991) is an American professional boxer. He held the World Boxing Organization (Interim version) light welterweight world title in 2025. As of April 2025, he is ranked as the world's fourth-best active light welterweight by The Ring.

== Professional career ==
Barboza made his professional debut as a welterweight on June 14, 2013, scoring a six-round unanimous decision (UD) victory against Gustavo Lopez at the Chumash Casino Resort in Santa Ynez, California.

After compiling a record of 19–0 (7 KOs) he defeated Manuel Lopez via ten-round UD on December 14, 2018, capturing the vacant WBC-NABF Junior light welterweight title at the American Bank Center in Corpus Christi, Texas. All three judges scored the bout 100–90. Barboza scored another three victories in 2019; a third-round knockout (KO) to retain his title against former world title challenger Mike Alvarado in April; a fourth-round stoppage via corner retirement (RTD) against Ricky Sismundo in a non-title bout in August; and a second successful defence of his title against William Silva via fifth-round KO in November.

Barboza Jr. faced Tony Luis on August 29, 2020, in his first fight of the year. He won the bout by unanimous decision, with all three judges scoring the fight 99–90 in his favor. Barboza Jr. was booked to face the one-time WBO light welterweight title challenger Alex Saucedo for the vacant WBO International light welterweight title on October 17, 2020. He won the fight by unanimous decision, with scores of 96–93, 97–92 and 97–92.

Barboza made his first WBO International title defense against Antonio Moran on August 14, 2021, on the undercard of the Joshua Franco and Andrew Moloney trilogy bout. He won the fight by a dominant unanimous decision, with scores of 99–91, 100–90 and 99–91.

Barboza was scheduled to face Sean McComb on April 20, 2024 in Brooklyn, New York billing as the co-main event of the Ryan Garcia vs. Devin Haney bout. Barboza won the fight via controversial split decision to retain his WBO Intercontinental junior welterweight title.

On 16 November 2024, he beat José Ramírez by unanimous decision in a 10-round bout at The Venue Riyadh in Saudi Arabia.

Barboza faced Jack Catterall in a WBO super lightweight title eliminator on 15 February 2025 at Co-op Live in Manchester, England. He won by split decision.

Barboza unsuccessfully challenged Teofimo Lopez for his WBO super lightweight title, losing a unanimous decision in Times Square in New York City, on May 2, 2025.

Barboza returned to the ring to face Kenneth Sims Jr. in a welterweight debut at the Honda Center in Anaheim, California, on March 14, 2026. He won via unanimous decision.

== Professional boxing record ==
34 fights	33 wins	1 loss
By knockout	11	0
By decision	22	1

No.	Result	Record	Opponent	Type	Round, time	Date	Location	Notes
34	Win	33–1	Kenneth Sims Jr.	UD	12	Mar 14, 2026	Honda Center, Anaheim, California, U.S.	Won vacant WBO Global welterweight title
33	Loss	32–1	Teofimo Lopez	UD	12	May 2, 2025	Times Square, New York City, New York, U.S.	For WBO and The Ring light welterweight titles
32	Win	32–0	Jack Catterall	SD	12	Feb 15, 2025	Co-op Live, Manchester, England	Won vacant WBO interim light welterweight title
31	Win	31–0	José Ramírez	UD	10	Nov 16, 2024	The Venue Riyadh Season, Riyadh, Saudi Arabia	
30	Win	30–0	Seán McComb	SD	10	Apr 20, 2024	Barclays Center, Brooklyn, New York, U.S.	Retained WBO Inter-Continental light welterweight title
29	Win	29–0	Xolisani Ndongeni	RTD	8 (10), 3:00	Jan 6, 2024	Virgin Hotels Las Vegas, Las Vegas, U.S	
28	Win	28–0	José Pedraza	UD	10	Feb 3, 2023	Desert Diamond Arena, Glendale, Arizona, U.S.	Retained WBO Inter-Continental light welterweight title
27	Win	27–0	Danielito Zorrilla	UD	10	Jul 15, 2022	Pechanga Resort & Casino, Temecula, California, U.S.	Won vacant WBO Inter-Continental light welterweight title
26	Win	26–0	Antonio Moran	UD	10	Aug 14, 2021	Hard Rock Hotel & Casino, Tulsa, Oklahoma, U.S.	Retained WBO International light welterweight title
25	Win	25–0	Alex Saucedo	UD	10	Oct 17, 2020	MGM Grand Conference Center, Paradise, Nevada, U.S.	Won vacant WBO International light welterweight title
24	Win	24–0	Tony Luis	UD	10	Aug 29, 2020	MGM Grand Conference Center, Paradise, Nevada, U.S.	
23	Win	23–0	William Silva	KO	5 (10), 2:59	Nov 30, 2019	Cosmopolitan of Las Vegas, Paradise, Nevada, U.S.	Retained WBC-NABF Junior light welterweight title
22	Win	22–0	Ricky Sismundo	RTD	4 (10), 3:00	Aug 17, 2019	Banc of California Stadium, Los Angeles, California, U.S.	
21	Win	21–0	Mike Alvarado	KO	3 (10), 0:49	Apr 12, 2019	Staples Center, Los Angeles, California, U.S.	Retained WBC-NABF Junior light welterweight title
20	Win	20–0	Manuel Damairias Lopez	UD	10	Dec 14, 2018	American Bank Center, Corpus Christi, Texas, U.S.	Won vacant WBC-NABF Junior light welterweight title
19	Win	19–0	Luis Solís	TKO	5 (10), 3:00	Aug 25, 2018	Gila River Arena, Glendale, Arizona, U.S.	
18	Win	18–0	Mike Reed	UD	10	Mar 10, 2018	StubHub Center, Carson, California, U.S.	
17	Win	17–0	Jonathan Chicas	UD	8	Aug 5, 2017	Microsoft Theater, Los Angeles, California, U.S.	
16	Win	16–0	Markus Morris	KO	5 (8), 0:46	Apr 28, 2017	Marriott Convention Center, Burbank, California, U.S.	
15	Win	15–0	Johnny Rodríguez	UD	8	Jan 27, 2017	Sportsmans Lodge, Los Angeles, California, U.S.	
14	Win	14–0	Martin Angel Martinez	UD	6	Dec 15, 2016	Exchange L.A., Los Angeles, California, U.S.	
13	Win	13–0	John David Charles	UD	6	Jul 16, 2016	Pioneer Event Center, Lancaster, California, U.S.	
12	Win	12–0	John Nater	KO	2 (6), 0:49	May 14, 2016	Sportsmans Lodge, Los Angeles, California, U.S.	
11	Win	11–0	Maximilliano Becerra	UD	6	Mar 12, 2016	Marriott Convention Center, Burbank, California, U.S.	
10	Win	10–0	Robbie Cannon	KO	1 (6), 2:59	Jan 30, 2016	Marriott Convention Center, Burbank, California, U.S.	
9	Win	9–0	Rony Óscar Alvarado	KO	6 (6), 1:23	Dec 12, 2015	Civic Auditorium, Glendale, California, U.S.	
8	Win	8–0	Lionel Jimenez	UD	6	Jul 25, 2015	Florentine Gardens, Los Angeles, California, U.S.	
7	Win	7–0	Brandon Adams	UD	6	May 30, 2015	Florentine Gardens, Los Angeles, California, U.S.	
6	Win	6–0	James Harrison	KO	4 (6), 1:45	Mar 14, 2015	Civic Auditorium, Glendale, California, U.S.	
5	Win	5–0	Taif Harris	KO	1 (4), 1:45	Jan 17, 2015	Oceanview Pavilion, Port Hueneme, California, U.S.	
4	Win	4–0	Samuel Garcia	UD	4	Dec 6, 2014	Civic Auditorium, Glendale, California, U.S.	
3	Win	3–0	Douglas Rosales	UD	4	Oct 19, 2013	Pico Rivera Sports Arena, Pico Rivera, California, U.S.	
2	Win	2–0	Vicente Guzman	UD	4	Aug 9, 2013	Morongo Casino Resort & Spa, Cabazon, California, U.S.	
1	Win	1–0	Gustavo Lopez	UD	6	Jun 14, 2013	Chumash Casino Resort, Santa Ynez, California, U.S.	

Achievements
Vacant Title last held by Chris Algieri	WBO International super lightweight champion October 17, 2020 – July 15, 2022; Won Inter-continental title	Vacant Title next held by Teofimo Lopez
Vacant Title last held by Tyrone McKenna	WBO Inter-Continental super lightweight champion July 15, 2022 – February 15, 2025; Won interim world title	Vacant Title next held by Hendri Cedeno
