= Ricky Burns vs. Terence Crawford =

Boxing match

Man of Steel
- Date: 1 March 2014
- Venue: Scottish Exhibition and Conference Centre, Glasgow, Scotland, UK
- Title on the line: WBO lightweight title

Tale of the tape
Boxer	Ricky Burns	Terence Crawford
Nickname	"The Rickster"	"Bud"
Hometown	Coatbridge, Lanarkshire, UK	Omaha, Nebraska, U.S.
Purse	£500,000	
Pre-fight record	36–2–1 (11 KO)	22–0 (16 KO)
Age	30 years, 10 months	26 years, 5 months
Height	5 ft 9 in (175 cm)	5 ft 8 in (173 cm)
Weight	134 1/4 lb (61 kg)	134 1/4 lb (61 kg)
Style	Orthodox	Southpaw
Recognition	WBO; Lightweight Champion; TBRB; No. 3 Ranked Lightweight; The Ring; No. 4 Ranked Lightweight; 2-division world champion	WBO; No. 1 Ranked Lightweight; TBRB; No. 5 Ranked Lightweight; The Ring; No. 10 Ranked Lightweight

Result
- Crawford defeats Burns by unanimous decision

Ricky Burns vs. Terence Crawford, billed as Man of Steel, was a professional boxing match contested on 1 March 2014, for the WBO Lightweight championship.

== Background ==
Since his promotion to full WBO lightweight champion in January 2012, Ricky Burns had made four successful defences, the last of which was a split decision draw with Ray Beltrán in September 2013. After the fight it emerged that Beltrán had broken Burns's jaw as early as the 2nd round. After successful surgery Burns expressed interest in a rematch with Beltrán however, the WBO had installed unbeaten contenter Terence Crawford as their mandatory challenger. While it was believed that Burns' promoter Eddie Hearn had wanted the rematch with Beltrán, Crawford's promoter Top Rank were ready to enforce his mandatory status, hence a deal was done in December 2013 for the two to meet early in 2014.

Speaking at the formal announcement Hearn told ESPN "I'm delighted to bring this fight to Scotland. We tried hard to make the Beltran rematch but Crawford is the mandatory and Ricky is happy to accept the challenge. It's perhaps the toughest test Ricky has faced so far. There seems to be plenty of hype around Crawford, so let's see how he gets on trying to take Ricky's title in his backyard." Crawford, who was fighting outside the U.S. for the first time, expressed confidence for his first world title bout saying "I hope Burns is ready to walk to hell and back. I'm going to fight with all my heart. I have the determination and the skill to win the world title and bring it home."

During the build up, Burns assuaged any suggestion that his jaw, which now had a titanium plate inserted, saying "My jaw's been holding up as well. I've taken a few knocks and it seems to be holding up...Fingers crossed [the jaw] holds up on fight night and there's no accidents."

Burns was a 2 to 1 underdog.

== The fights ==
=== Undercard ===
The live card began with a victory for 2012 Olympic bronze medalist Anthony Ogogo. This was followed by wins for Martin Joseph Ward, David Brophy, Scott Cardle and John Murray.

=== Joshua vs. Avila ===
The chief support saw 2012 Olympic Gold medalist Anthony Joshua face Argentinian veteran Héctor Alfredo Ávila.

Joshua would knockout Avila in the 1st round.

Preceded by vs. Dorian Darch	Anthony Joshua's bouts 1 March 2014	Succeeded by vs. Matt Legg
Preceded by vs. Marcelo Domínguez	Héctor Alfredo Ávila's bouts 1 March 2014	Succeeded by vs. Fernando Nahuel Lobos

=== Main Event ===
Both fighters were cautious in the opening round, with Burns’ jab making the early impact. Crawford adjusted in the 2nd, neutralizing Burns’ jab. The action heated up in the 5th as Crawford began to showcase his offensive skills, with champion waiting too long to get his punches off. Despite the tactical nature of the fight, with both boxers using feints, jabs, and lateral movement to disrupt each other, Crawford took control and set the pace. Burns tried to stand his ground in the 7th, attempting to go toe-to-toe with Crawford, but Crawford’s hard jab and aggressive approach soon took over. In the 8th, Crawford was punishing Burns with heavy shots. Burns caught Crawford cleanly early in the 9th. The challenger continued to outwork and outland Burns in the championship rounds. By the 12th, Crawford was pouring on the pressure, looking to finish, landing a series of headshots with Burns on the ropes but the Champion remained upright and saw the final bell. The judges scored the fight 117–111, 116–112 and 116–112 all in favour of Crawford.

Former world champion Jim Watt on the Sky Sports broadcast scored it 117–111 for Crawford.

Over the twelve rounds, Crawford landed 213 of 811 punches thrown (26.2%). Burns landed 76 of his 552 thrown (13.8%).

== Aftermath ==
A delighted Crawford said at ringside "I'm lost for words, I'm happy, yeah, I've got that belt." Burns meanwhile praised Crawford after the fight, simply stating, "The better man won" before adding "There are some big fights out there for me but my first choice would be a rematch. We knew it was going to be difficult. I knew how good he was. I'd like to keep fighting at world level. I think I proved tonight that I definitely do belong there. I'm definitely going to stay at lightweight. I made the weight comfortably." Burns would also say he wanted a rematch "First thing I said to Eddie after the fight was 'we'll be chasing for a rematch'. Hopefully, we can get that sorted."

Crawford was linked to a number of fighters following his victory including Beltrán, former featherweight champion Yuriorkis Gamboa, IBF champion Miguel Vázquez or WBA champion Richar Abril.

== Undercard ==
Confirmed bouts:

Winner	Loser	Weight division/title belt(s) disputed	Result
Floater bouts
(United Kingdom) Ryan Smith	(United Kingdom) Ibrar Riyaz	Lightweight (4 rounds)	Points decision
Live bouts
(United Kingdom) Anthony Joshua	(Argentina) Héctor Alfredo Ávila	Heavyweight (6 rounds)	1st round TKO
(United Kingdom) John Murray	(United Kingdom) John Simpson	Lightweight (10 rounds)	2nd round TKO
(United Kingdom) Scott Cardle	(United Kingdom) Paul Appleby	Lightweight (8 rounds)	8th round TKO
(United Kingdom) David Brophy	(United Kingdom) Jamie Ambler	Sper middleweight (8 rounds)	Points decision
(United Kingdom) Martin Joseph Ward	(United Kingdom) Craig Woodruff	Super featherweight (6 rounds)	4th round TKO
(United Kingdom) Anthony Ogogo	(United Kingdom) Greg O'Neil	Middleweight (6 rounds)	Points decision
Preliminary bouts
(United Kingdom) Michael Roberts	(France) Romain Peker	Super featherweight (4 rounds)	Points decision
(United Kingdom) Scott Allan	(United Kingdom) Francis Croes	Bantamweight (4 rounds)	Points decision
(United Kingdom) Ryan Collins	(Poland) Mariusz Bak	Super featherweight (4 rounds)	Points decision

== Broadcasting ==
Country	Broadcaster
United Kingdom	Sky Sports
United States	AWE

Preceded by vs. Ray Beltrán	Ricky Burns's bouts 1 March 2014	Succeeded by vs. Dejan Zlatičanin
Preceded by vs. Andrey Klimov	Terence Crawford's bouts 1 March 2014	Succeeded by vs. Yuriorkis Gamboa
