= Jose Gonzalez (boxer) =

Puerto Rican professional boxer (born 1983)

Personal information
- Nickname: Chelo
- Nationality: Puerto Rican
- Born: Jose A Gonzalez; June 6, 1983 (age 43) Toa Baja, Puerto Rico
- Height: 5 ft 8 in (173 cm)
- Weight: Lightweight

Boxing career
- Reach: 73 in (185 cm)
- Stance: Orthodox

Boxing record
- Total fights: 26
- Wins: 24
- Win by KO: 19
- Losses: 2

Jose A Gonzalez (born June 6, 1983) is a Puerto Rican professional boxer who has challenged once for the WBO lightweight title.

== Professional career ==
Gonzalez made his professional debut on April 25, 2008, winning a four-round points decision against Israel Suarez, who also debuted. Fighting exclusively in his native Puerto Rico for the next five years, Gonzalez would remain undefeated while making five successful defenses of the regional WBO Latino lightweight title. On May 11, 2013, Gonzalez travelled abroad for the first time to face WBO lightweight champion Ricky Burns. After nine rounds, and despite having built up a comfortable lead on all three judges' scorecards, Gonzalez surprised onlookers by retiring on his stool, citing a wrist injury.

More than a year-and-a-half later, Gonzalez returned to the ring on December 20, 2014, regaining the vacant WBO Latino lightweight title by stopping Antonio João Bento in two rounds. On June 26, 2015, Gonzalez was stopped in seven rounds by Diego Magdaleno.

== Professional boxing record ==
| 26 fights | 24 wins | 2 losses |
|---|---|---|
| By knockout | 19 | 2 |
| By decision | 4 | 0 |
| By disqualification | 1 | 0 |

| No. | Result | Record | Opponent | Type | Round, time | Date | Location | Notes |
|---|---|---|---|---|---|---|---|---|
| 26 | Loss | 24–2 | Diego Magdaleno | TKO | 7 (12), 2:43 | Jun 26, 2015 | State Farm Arena, Hidalgo, Texas, U.S. | For vacant WBO International lightweight title |
| 25 | Win | 24–1 | Marvin Quintero | RTD | 5 (10), 3:00 | Apr 11, 2015 | José Miguel Agrelot Coliseum, San Juan, Puerto Rico | Retained WBO Latino lightweight title |
| 24 | Win | 23–1 | Antonio João Bento | TKO | 2 (10), 2:27 | Dec 20, 2014 | El San Juan Resort & Casino, Carolina, Puerto Rico | Won vacant WBO Latino lightweight title |
| 23 | Loss | 22–1 | Ricky Burns | RTD | 9 (12), 3:00 | May 11, 2013 | Emirates Arena, Glasgow, Scotland | For WBO lightweight title |
| 22 | Win | 22–0 | José Alejandro Rodríguez | RTD | 5 (10), 3:00 | Feb 2, 2013 | Coliseo Rubén Rodríguez, Bayamón, Puerto Rico | Retained WBO Latino lightweight title |
| 21 | Win | 21–0 | Oscar Cuero | TKO | 1 (10), 2:26 | Oct 6, 2012 | Coliseo Rubén Rodríguez, Bayamón, Puerto Rico | Retained WBO Latino lightweight title |
| 20 | Win | 20–0 | Joseph Laryea | TKO | 3 (10), 2:59 | Jul 7, 2012 | Coliseo Antonio R. Barceló, Toa Baja, Puerto Rico | |
| 19 | Win | 19–0 | Hevinson Herrera | TKO | 8 (10), 1:48 | Mar 10, 2012 | Roberto Clemente Coliseum, San Juan, Puerto Rico | Retained WBO Latino lightweight title |
| 18 | Win | 18–0 | Fernando Trejo | UD | 10 | Nov 4, 2011 | Coliseo Antonio R. Barceló, Toa Baja, Puerto Rico | Retained WBO Latino lightweight title |
| 17 | Win | 17–0 | Edgardo Soto | KO | 1 (10), 1:50 | Sep 2, 2011 | Coliseo Rubén Rodríguez, Bayamón, Puerto Rico | Retained WBO Latino lightweight title |
| 16 | Win | 16–0 | Gerardo Cuevas | RTD | 6 (10), 0:10 | Jun 3, 2011 | Coliseo Antonio R. Barceló, Toa Baja, Puerto Rico | Won vacant WBO Latino lightweight title |
| 15 | Win | 15–0 | Miguel Angel Munguia | TKO | 3 (6), 0:46 | Apr 16, 2011 | Coliseo Rubén Rodríguez, Bayamón, Puerto Rico | |
| 14 | Win | 14–0 | Derrick Campos | TKO | 5 (10), 2:54 | Feb 5, 2011 | Coliseo Rubén Rodríguez, Bayamón, Puerto Rico | |
| 13 | Win | 13–0 | Andres Navarro | TKO | 7 (10), 2:20 | Oct 22, 2010 | Coliseo Antonio R. Barceló, Toa Baja, Puerto Rico | |
| 12 | Win | 12–0 | Hector Marengo | TKO | 6 (6), 1:19 | Aug 28, 2010 | Mario Morales Coliseum, Guaynabo, Puerto Rico | |
| 11 | Win | 11–0 | Matthew Robinson | KO | 1 (4), 1:49 | Jul 10, 2010 | José Miguel Agrelot Coliseum, San Juan, Puerto Rico | |
| 10 | Win | 10–0 | Keivy Arce | KO | 2 (6), 2:26 | May 29, 2010 | Coliseo Rubén Rodríguez, Bayamón, Puerto Rico | |
| 9 | Win | 9–0 | Roberto Acevedo | DQ | 5 (8), 0:32 | Feb 26, 2010 | Coliseo Rubén Rodríguez, Bayamón, Puerto Rico | |
| 8 | Win | 8–0 | Javier Garcia | TKO | 2 (8), 2:49 | Oct 24, 2009 | Roberto Clemente Coliseum, San Juan, Puerto Rico | |
| 7 | Win | 7–0 | Joan Cesario | TKO | 4 (6), 0:54 | Aug 21, 2009 | Coliseo Pedrin Zorrilla, San Juan, Puerto Rico | |
| 6 | Win | 6–0 | Eric Cruz | SD | 6 | Mar 28, 2009 | Coliseo Rubén Rodríguez, Bayamón, Puerto Rico | |
| 5 | Win | 5–0 | Enrique Quinones | TKO | 3 (4), 2:24 | Dec 13, 2008 | José Miguel Agrelot Coliseum, San Juan, Puerto Rico | |
| 4 | Win | 4–0 | Enrique Quinones | UD | 6 | Oct 4, 2008 | José Miguel Agrelot Coliseum, San Juan, Puerto Rico | |
| 3 | Win | 3–0 | Osenohan Vazquez | KO | 3 (4), 2:20 | Aug 8, 2008 | Coliseo Antonio R. Barceló, Toa Baja, Puerto Rico | |
| 2 | Win | 2–0 | Milton Gonzalez | TKO | 1 (4), 0:40 | May 23, 2008 | Coliseo Antonio R. Barceló, Toa Baja, Puerto Rico | |
| 1 | Win | 1–0 | Israel Suarez | PTS | 4 | Apr 25, 2008 | Coliseo Antonio R. Barceló, Toa Baja, Puerto Rico | Professional debut |

Sporting positions
Regional boxing titles
| Vacant Title last held by Hardy Paredes | WBO Latino lightweight champion June 3, 2011 – May 11, 2013; Lost bid for world title | Vacant Title next held by William Silva |
| Vacant Title last held by William Silva | WBO Latino lightweight champion December 20, 2014 – April 2015; Vacated | Vacant Title next held by Félix Verdejo |
