= Dejan Zlatičanin =

Montenegrin boxer (born 1984)

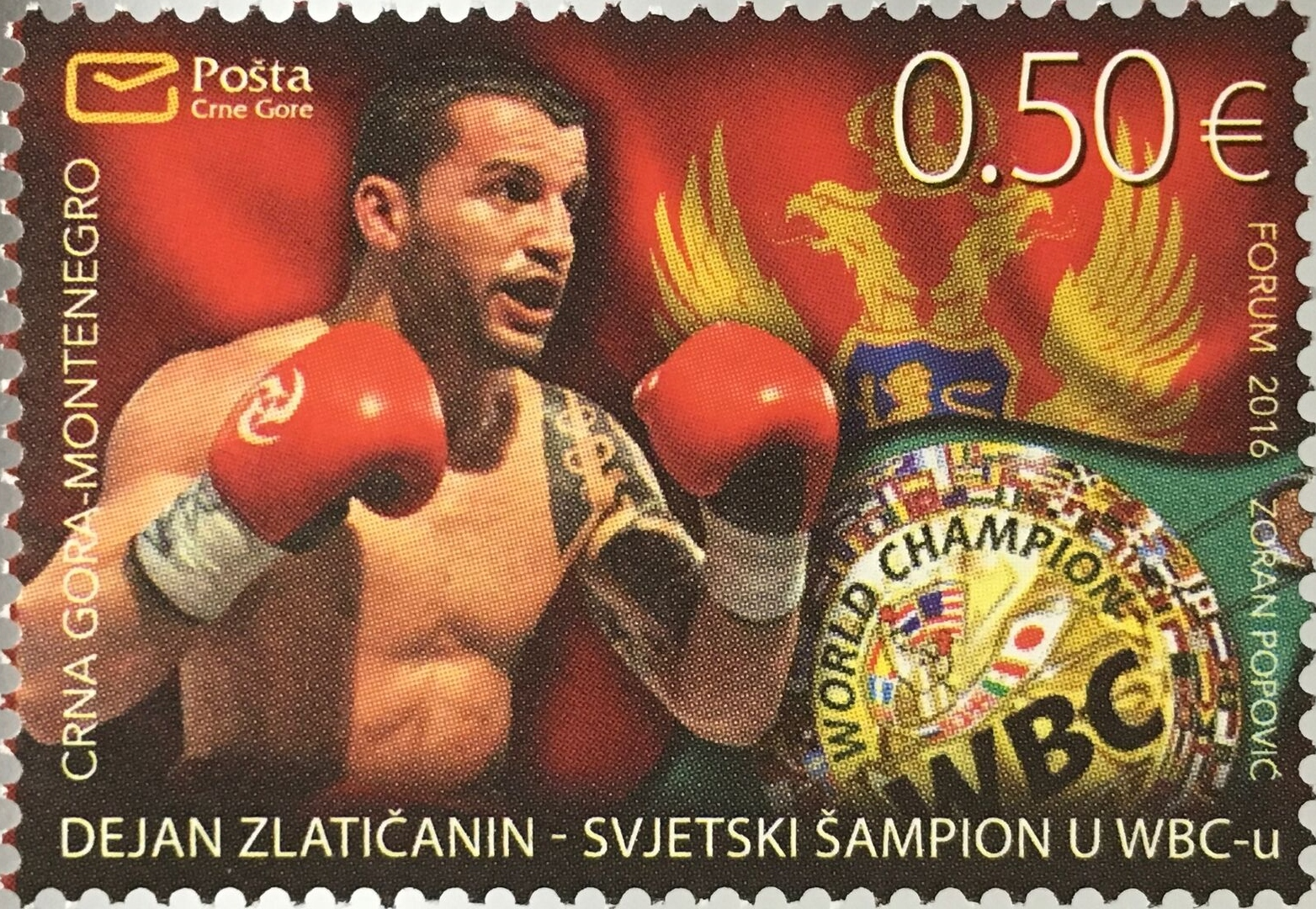

Personal information
- Nickname: Dynamite
- Nationality: Montenegrin
- Born: 23 April 1984 (age 42) Titograd, SR Montenegro, SFR Yugoslavia
- Height: 1.63 m (5 ft 4 in)
- Weight: Lightweight

Boxing career
- Reach: 165 cm (65 in)
- Stance: Southpaw

Boxing record
- Total fights: 29
- Wins: 25
- Win by KO: 17
- Losses: 4

Dejan Zlatičanin (born 23 April 1984) is a Montenegrin professional boxer. He is the first Montenegrin boxer to win a boxing world title, having held the WBC lightweight title from 2016 to 2017.

== Professional career ==
Zlatičanin made his professional debut on 3 May 2008, scoring a third-round technical decision against Wladimir Borov. On 1 February 2011, he won his first regional championship — the vacant WBC Mediterranean lightweight title— via unanimous decision over Felix Lora. Later that year, on 26 November, he claimed the vacant WBV International lightweight title with a unanimous decision over Godfrey Nzimande.

=== Zlaticanin vs. Burns ===
Having vacated the title, he regained it, and earned a world title shot, by defeating Ricky Burns at Braehead Arena in Glasgow, Scotland, on 27 June 2014. Zlatičanin knocked his opponent to the canvas after just 30 seconds of the first round and went on to win via split decision with two of the ringside judges scoring the fight 115–113 in his favour, while the third had it for Burns by the same score.

=== Zlaticanin vs. Mamani ===
The pinnacle of Zlatičanin's career came at Turning Stone Resort & Casino in Verona, New York, USA, on 11 June 2016, when he won the WBC lightweight title to become the first Montenegrin world boxing champion. He was originally scheduled to face defending champion Jorge Linares, but the Venezuelan withdrew due to a fractured hand and was designated as champion in recess. Franklin Mamani was drafted in as a replacement, taking the fight on just 11 days notice. In the third round, with Mamani backed up against the ropes and taking heavy punishment, the referee stepped in to halt the contest, giving Zlatičanin victory by technical knockout.

=== Zlaticanin vs. Garcia ===
Zlatičanin lost the title in his first defense to Mikey Garcia at MGM Grand Garden Arena in Paradise, Nevada, USA, on 28 January 2017. He was knocked out in the third round.

=== Zlaticanin vs. Abdullaev ===
On 11 September 2021, Zlaticanin faced Zaur Abdullaev for the vacant WBC Silver lightweight title at RCC Boxing Academy in Ekaterinburg, Russia. He lost via unanimous decision with the judges' scorecards reading 109–119, 110–118 and 111–117.

=== Zlaticanin vs. Ritson ===
In his next bout, Zlaticanin fought Lewis Ritson at Newcastle Arena in Newcastle, England, on 25 March 2022, losing by unanimous decision.

== Bare-knuckle boxing ==
In August 2026, it was announced that Zlatičanin had signed with Bare Knuckle Fighting Championship and would make his debut for the promotion against Said-Khusein Akhyadov in Belgrade, Serbia, on 17 October 2026 at BKFC Fight Night: Belgrade. However, the event was postponed to a to be determined date for undisclosed reasons.

== Professional boxing record ==
29 fights	25 wins	4 losses
By knockout	17	2
By decision	8	2

No.	Result	Record	Opponent	Type	Round, time	Date	Location	Notes
29	Win	25–4	(Hungary) Adrian Orban	TKO	1 (6), 0:54	14 Apr 2024	Black Wolves Fight Club, Wiesbaden, Germany	
28	Loss	24–4	(United Kingdom) Lewis Ritson	UD	10	25 Mar 2022	(United Kingdom) Newcastle Arena, Newcastle, England	
27	Loss	24–3	(Russia) Zaur Abdullaev	UD	12	11 Sep 2021	RCC Boxing Academy, Ekaterinburg, Russia	For vacant WBC Silver lightweight title
26	Win	24–2	(Russia) Viskhan Murzabekov	UD	10	10 Nov 2019	Hala Moraca, Podgorica, Montenegro	
25	Loss	23–2	(Mexico) Roberto Ramirez	TKO	2 (10), 2:32	21 Jun 2018	(United States) Melrose Ballroom, New York City, New York, US	
24	Win	23–1	(Colombia) Hevinson Herrera	KO	1 (8), 1:57	15 Dec 2017	(United States) B.B. King Blues Club & Grill, New York City, New York, US	
23	Loss	22–1	(United States) Mikey Garcia	KO	3 (12), 2:21	28 Jan 2017	(United States) MGM Grand Garden Arena, Paradise, Nevada, US	Lost WBC lightweight title
22	Win	22–0	(Bolivia) Franklin Mamani	TKO	3 (12), 0:54	11 Jun 2016	(United States) Turning Stone Resort & Casino, Verona, New York, US	Won vacant WBC lightweight title
21	Win	21–0	(Ukraine) Ivan Redkach	TKO	4 (12), 1:24	13 Jun 2015	(United States) Bartow Arena, Birmingham, Alabama, US	
20	Win	20–0	(Ecuador) Alex Bone	UD	10	25 Oct 2014	Mediterranean Sports Centre, Budva, Montenegro	
19	Win	19–0	(United Kingdom) Ricky Burns	SD	12	27 Jun 2014	(United Kingdom) Braehead Arena, Glasgow, Scotland	Won vacant WBC International lightweight title
18	Win	18–0	(Bulgaria) Asan Yuseinov	KO	1 (10), 2:27	24 Aug 2013	Budva, Montenegro	
17	Win	17–0	(Russia) Petr Petrov	UD	12	13 Apr 2013	Topolica Sport Hall, Bar, Montenegro	Retained WBC International lightweight title
16	Win	16–0	(Uzbekistan) Bahrom Payozov	KO	8 (12), 1:53	24 Jul 2012	Budva, Montenegro	Retained WBC International lightweight title
15	Win	15–0	(Romania) Vasile Herteg	KO	1 (8), 2:02	24 Mar 2012	Sportski Centar, Nikšić, Montenegro	
14	Win	14–0	(South Africa) Godfrey Nzimande	UD	12	26 Nov 2011	Morača Sports Center, Podgorica, Montenegro	Won vacant WBC International lightweight title
13	Win	13–0	(Spain) Hoang Sang Nguyen	KO	5 (12), 2:06	29 Apr 2011	Morača Sports Center, Podgorica, Montenegro	Retained WBC Mediterranean lightweight title
12	Win	12–0	(Dominican Republic) Felix Lora	UD	12	25 Feb 2011	Hotel Park, Novi Sad, Serbia	Won vacant WBC Mediterranean lightweight title
11	Win	11–0	(Romania) Cristian Spataru	KO	2 (6)	4 Mar 2010	Grand Hotel, Kopaonik, Serbia	
10	Win	10–0	(Hungary) Istvan Hegedus	TKO	4 (6)	28 Nov 2009	Hall Prokleta Avlija, Drvengrad, Serbia	
9	Win	9–0	(Croatia) Antonio Horvatić	TKO	1 (6)	3 Oct 2009	Sport Hall, Budva, Montenegro	
8	Win	8–0	(Germany) Suleyman Dag	TKO	2 (6), 2:34	16 Apr 2009	Podgorica, Montenegro	
7	Win	7–0	(Hungary) Sandor Fekete	UD	4	17 Dec 2008	Zetra Olympic Hall, Sarajevo, Bosnia and Herzegovina	
6	Win	6–0	(Croatia) Edin Kavara	KO	1 (6), 0:35	18 Oct 2008	Sport Hall, Budva, Montenegro	
5	Win	5–0	(Serbia) Bojan Žarkov	KO	1 (6)	26 Sep 2008	Zvornik, Bosnia and Herzegovina	
4	Win	4–0	(Hungary) Tibor Horvath	TKO	1 (4)	23 Aug 2008	Kruševac, Serbia	
3	Win	3–0	(Serbia) Bojan Žarkov	KO	1 (4)	9 Aug 2008	Kanjiža, Serbia	
2	Win	2–0	(Bosnia and Herzegovina) Enko Alic	TKO	1 (6)	1 Aug 2008	Budva, Montenegro	
1	Win	1–0	(Bulgaria) Wladimir Borov	TD	3 (4)	3 May 2008	Sport Hall, Budva, Montenegro	

Sporting positions
Regional boxing titles
Vacant Title last held by Emiliano Marsili	WBC Mediterranean lightweight champion 25 February 2011 – 26 November 2011; Won International title	Vacant Title next held by Hedi Slimani
Vacant Title last held by Matias Daniel Ferreyra	WBC International lightweight champion 26 November 2011 – March 2014; Vacated	Vacant Title next held by Sergio Thompson
Vacant Title last held by Sergio Thompson	WBC International lightweight champion 27 June 2014 – August 2015; Vacated	Vacant Title next held by Luke Campbell
World boxing titles
Vacant Title last held by Jorge Linares	WBC lightweight champion 11 June 2016 – 28 January 2017	Succeeded by Mikey Garcia
