= Ricky Burns =

Scottish boxer (born 1983)

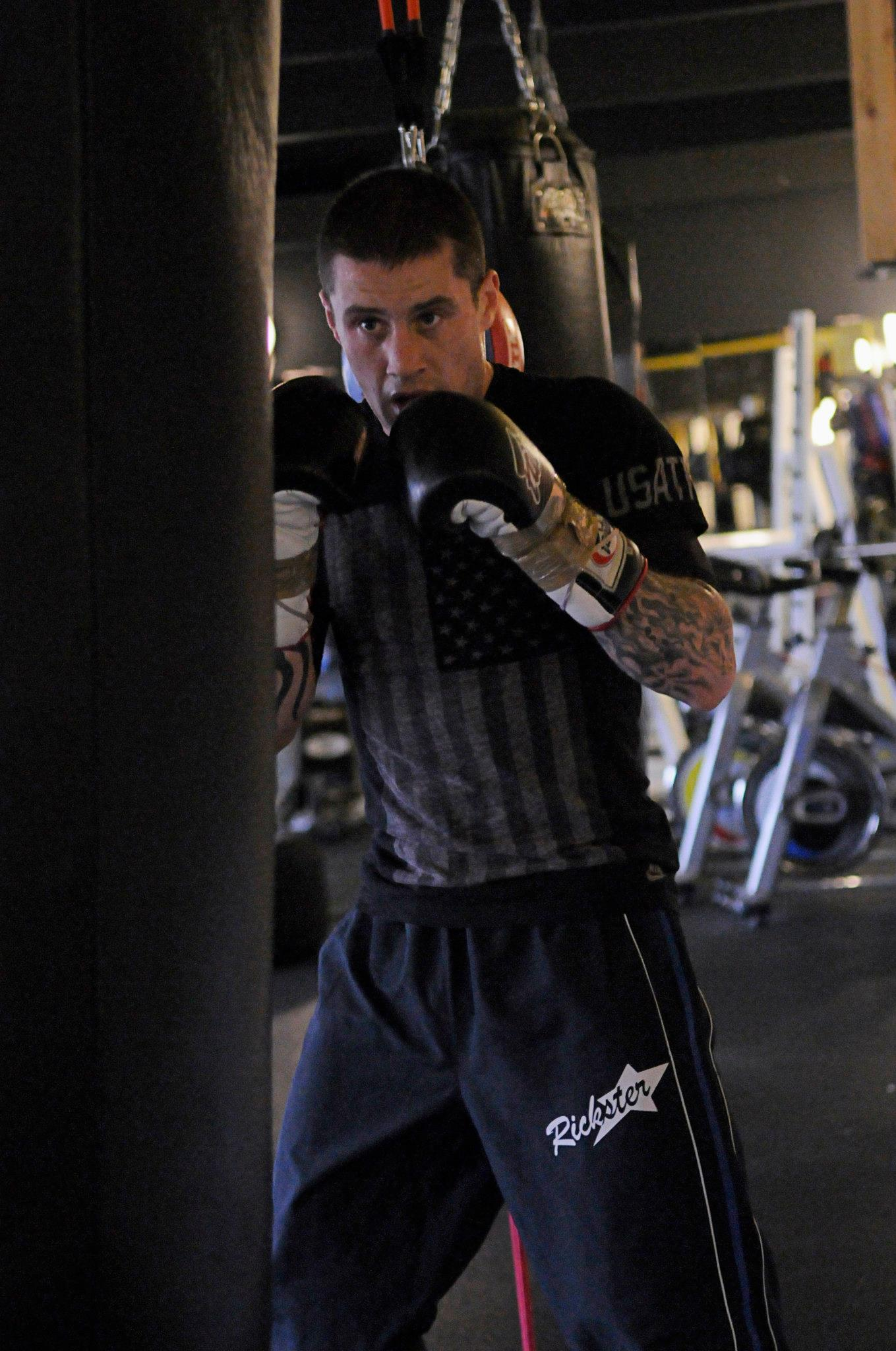
- Burns in 2013

Personal information
- Nickname: The Rickster
- Born: 13 April 1983 (age 43) Coatbridge, North Lanarkshire, Scotland
- Height: 5 ft 9 in (175 cm)
- Weight: Super-featherweight; Lightweight; Light-welterweight; Welterweight

Boxing career
- Reach: 70 in (178 cm)
- Stance: Orthodox

Boxing record
- Total fights: 54
- Wins: 45
- Win by KO: 17
- Losses: 8
- Draws: 1
- No contests: 0

Ricky Burns (born 13 April 1983) is a Scottish former professional boxer who competed from 2001 to 2023. He won world titles in three weight divisions and the first from Scotland, having held the World Boxing Organization (WBO) super-featherweight title from 2010 to 2011, the WBO lightweight title from 2012 to 2014, and the World Boxing Association (WBA) light-welterweight title from 2016 to 2017.

== Professional career ==
=== Super-featherweight ===
==== Early career ====
Burns first fight as a professional was a four-round victory in October 2001 over Woody Greenaway at the Kelvin Hall in Glasgow, Scotland. On 12 December 2004, following a string of seven wins over opponents including Jeff Thomas, Ernie Smith and Daniel Thorpe he was matched against fellow unbeaten prospect Colin Bain. The fight, at the Marriott Hotel in Glasgow, resulted in a first career defeat for Bain as Burns won over the six round distance. For Burns, the win set him up for a journey south of the border to face the unbeaten British lightweight champion Graham Earl in a non-title fight. The fight with Earl took place at the Wembley Conference Center and Burns produced one of the upsets of the year when he scored a points victory to beat Earl over eight rounds.

==== Domestic title fights ====
The win against Earl meant he would land a shot at the big time when in February 2006, he took on reigning British, Commonwealth and European champion Alex Arthur. The fight took place in Edinburgh and ended in defeat for Burns, as Arthur retained on points. Burns who was still only a 12-fight novice at this stage took the fight to Arthur prompting the champion to heap praise on him; "Ricky Burns was in superb shape and he was up for the fight" said Arthur, "He's a brilliant boxer with a great future and he could be a world champion one day." Burns himself refused to be disappointed with the loss saying; "I don't count that as a loss. I'm just 22 and it was great experience for me".

Burns next had a crack at the British title almost exactly a year later when in February 2007, he met reigning champion Carl Johanneson at the Town Hall in Leeds. The fight ended once again in defeat with Burns losing a 12-round decision to the experienced champion. Johanneson intent on winning well before his home crowd hounded Burns throughout the fight and managed to knock Burns down three times.

==== Regaining composure ====
After the defeat to Johanneson, Burns took the decision to leave his old boxing club in a bid to seek a new challenge. Burns had worked with Rab Bannan at the Barn Boxing Club for over 14 years, but the Johanneson defeat prompted a need for a change of direction. On telling his former mentor the news Burns said; "It was a nightmare having to tell him. It was really sad because I've been with him for 14 years. All my boxing life really. It was really hard but we left on good terms and we shook hands and I'm sure our paths will cross again." Burns moved to the Dalmarnock gym in Glasgow, where he could train alongside the likes of Willie Limond and Kenny Anderson.

Since the fight with Johanneson, Burns won eight fights in a row. A ten-round win over Romanian Gheorghe Ghiompirica at the Thistle Hotel in Glasgow gave him the lightly regarded British International Masters belt. Burns also spent time sparring former opponent Alex Arthur in preparation for Arthur's WBO super-featherweight title defence against Nicky Cook.

==== Commonwealth champion ====
In September 2008, Burns was in line for a crack at the vacant Commonwealth title, a belt which had been given up by Londoner Kevin Mitchell. The challenge took place at the York Hall in Bethnal Green and saw Burns outpoint the Ghanaian Osumana Akaba over 12 rounds. The fight, which was taken with only weeks notice after the original main event on the card was cancelled, propelled Burns into the championship frame. Speaking of his future ambitions Burns said; "There is only one fight I want at the moment. That fight would be the current British champion Kevin Mitchell. He recently has been injured, and won't be back until December so we'll have to see what happens".

Burns defended his crown at Glasgow's Kelvin Hall soon afterwards in November 2008, against another Ghanaian, Yakubu Amidu. The African fighter had a record of 16–1–1, with all his victories coming by way of stoppage. Burns however was too much and his superior fitness levels showed as the referee stopped the contest in the seventh round, handing victory to the Scotsman. Burns second defence took place in March 2009, and saw Burns halt former British champion Michael Gomez in the seventh round. On 20 June 2009, Burns made perhaps the toughest defence of his title yet with a hard-fought 12 round win over Northern Ireland's Kevin O'Hara, with the assistance of the highly experienced trainer Billy Nelson and his Fighting Scots Gym in Stepps. Ricky became Billy's first world champion.

==== Burns vs. Martínez ====
Burns success in the ring had elevated him to the number one ranking with the WBO's rankings. Burns's promoter Frank Warren tried to negotiate a match with the reigning champion Roman Martínez. The bout with the Puerto Rican champion had been subject to numerous delays with the fight scheduled for both Scotland and Puerto Rico at various intervals only for the fight never to materialise and for Martinez to make a voluntary defence of his title instead. The uncertainty for Burns meant that a proposed British title contest against Gary Sykes never happened with Sykes winning the title against Burns replacement Andy Morris and defending against the man Burns had defeated in his last Commonwealth title defence Kevin O'Hara. Finally after almost a year of frustration Burns re-entered the ring on 15 May 2010, on the undercard of Kevin Mitchell's world title shot against Michael Katsidis at the Boleyn Ground. Burns continued his winning streak and kept ticking over with an eight-round win over journeyman and former foe Youssef Al Hamidi. Burns claimed after the fight that he hoped the fight with Román Martinez would materialise around July and that it would be in Glasgow.

The WBO super-featherweight title showdown between Burns and Roman Martinez was eventually confirmed on 24 June 2010 and scheduled to take place at the Kelvin Hall, Glasgow on 4 September. Speaking at the announcement of the fight Burns said; "this has been dragging on a bit ... it is the biggest fight of my career but I'm more than confident that I can beat him". Finally on 4 September, Burns entered the ring at Kelvin Hall to face the WBO's unbeaten reigning world champion Roman Martinez. Martinez had held the title for over a year winning it from Englishman Nicky Cook and defending twice against Colombian Feider Viloria and Argentinian Gonzalo Munguia. Despite suffering a knockdown in the first round, Burns took the fight to the champion winning on all three judges scorecards 115–112, 115–112 and 115–113 to inflict a career first defeat on Martinez and finally winning the world title.

Speaking of the fight, Burns promoter Frank Warren said; "this was the best night I've ever had in Scotland and I've had some great shows with Scott Harrison and Alex Arthur as well as bringing Nigel Benn and Frank Bruno up here." Describing the atmosphere at the Kelvin Hall as "electric" he went on to praise Burns, who in winning the title had become Scotland's 12th world champion, saying Scotland had a new "sporting hero" and that the win would lead to a renaissance in Scottish boxing. It also transpired that before the fight the manager of Celtic, Neil Lennon had called to wish Burns the best and sent him a Celtic strip signed by the whole of the first team as a good luck present.

==== Burns vs. Evensen ====
On 4 December 2010, Burns defended his title for the first time against Norwegian boxer Andreas Evensen who held the WBO Inter-Continental featherweight title. The fight, at the Braehead Arena in Glasgow, resulted in another unanimous points win for Burns with the Scotsman also scoring a knockdown in the first round.

On 12 March 2011, Burns made his second defence again at the Braehead Arena. His opponent the Ghanaian boxer Joseph Laryea had won the WBO Inter-Continental title win a victory over Scotsman Paul Appleby on the same night that Burns beat Evenson. The fight was stopped in the 7th round after Laryea withdrew citing a broken knuckle with Burns ahead in the fight.

==== Burns vs. Cook ====
Burns's next defence was scheduled for 16 July 2011 and against former WBO champion Nicky Cook, in Liverpool's Echo Arena. The fight resulted in a 93-second stoppage for Burns as Cook's corner threw in the towel following an injury to his back. After only six seconds a punch from Burns resulted in Cook receiving a count and complaining of back trouble. Cook was sent to the canvas twice more before his corner retired the boxer handing a third straight defence of the title to Burns who said that he would like to fight the South African boxer Mzonke Fana next.

Burns was next scheduled to meet mandatory challenger, and Boxrec No. 1 rated super-featherweight, Adrien Broner, but announced on 22 September 2011 that he would be relinquishing his WBO super-featherweight title and moving up to compete at lightweight. Burns said that the move up a weight division would ease the pressure of having to control his weight saying "the last couple of fights it was getting harder and harder for me to do it." Adrien Broner commented on the situation, saying, "You vacated the title talking about you couldn't make weight no more. But you just fought four times and defended this title", Broner further said, "But everyone knows boxing is a game where you can duck fighters ... and I guess he felt like running away was best for his career."

=== Lightweight ===
==== Burns vs. Katsidis ====
In his first fight at the weight it was announced that Burns would fight Australian Michael Katsidis in London for the WBO interim lightweight title. Speaking of the fight Burns said that it would definitely be the toughest of his career saying "I don't think they could have got me a harder fight if they tried, he's been in with the best of the weight, he's proved himself, obviously he's one of the best in the division and it's a great chance to get out there and show what I can do." On 5 November 2011, Burns took on Katsidis for the WBO interim lightweight championship and despite being the slight underdog went on to win the fight by unanimous decision. After the fight Burns claimed to have "proved a lot of people wrong" as some people "thought Michael would walk all over me". Speaking of the fight he added "Michael didn't give me a minute, he kept coming forward but I'd prepared for that. I'm doing my job and that's the way I always look at it."

==== Burns vs. Moses ====
On 26 January 2012, Burns was installed as WBO lightweight champion after former champion Juan Manuel Márquez moved up a division to welterweight. Ricky defended his WBO lightweight title against Namibian fighter Paulus Moses. He will have the homefield advantage with the fight being held in Braehead Arena, Glasgow. Burns said, "It's great news about the title but it's back to reality and training hard for what will be a tough title defence against Moses in my homecoming in Scotland. For the last 10 years I've been grafting away in my career. But in the last couple of years it has really taken off with me beating Roman Martinez and then beating a great warrior like Katsidis to put me up there with the best in the world." Ricky would go on to successfully defend his title via a unanimous points win, with Moses outboxed by Ricky, who was awarded victory 119–110,120–110,117–111 by the three judges.

==== Burns vs. Mitchell ====
In June 2012 it was confirmed after months of negotiations that Burns's next fight will be another defence of his WBO lightweight title, against former WBO Inter-Continental lightweight champion Kevin Mitchell on 22 September 2012. In front of a sold out Scottish Exhibition and Conference Centre Burns turned in a career best performance to defeat Mitchell via fourth-round TKO. Burns looked the much bigger man on fight night and seemed to recognise this adopting a more aggressive style, he was gaining control of the fight by the 4th round out boxing Mitchell he would go on to knock Mitchell down twice in round 4 in the last minute of round 4 and a further onslaught forced the referee to stop the fight. After such a dominant performance, Burns was able to make a legitimate claim to being of the best at 135 pounds.

==== Promotional changes ====
On 15 December 2012, Burns was expected to defend his WBO lightweight title against Liam Walsh at the ExCeL, London. Walsh was later involved in a car crash and had to pull out. Walsh's replacement was revealed to be Jose Ocampo. Ocampo however, had to pull out due to death of his trainer. then followed an announcement from Burns that he would not be competing in London on that date after not being able to find an opponent in time. With promoter Frank Warren unable to secure an opponent for a rescheduled date of 26 January 2013, Burns declined the opportunity of an exhibition bout, deciding instead to take a long rest between fights.

On 4 March 2013, the unification fight between Burns and Miguel Vázquez (which was originally scheduled for 16 March 2013) was postponed to 20 April 2013 because Vazquez was suffering from a viral infection. Burns was due to defend his WBO title while also challenging for Vazquez' IBF title. The Vazquez fight was also called off with Burns manager Alex Morrison telling The Scotsman "I doubt very much that fight was ever going to happen – leading to an announcement on 7 March 2013 that Burns had left Frank Warren's promotion stable.

==== Miscellaneous defences ====
On 11 March 2013 it was confirmed that Burns had joined Eddie Hearn's Matchroom promotions and fought for the first time under Matchroom on 11 May 2013, when he faced Puerto Rican Jose Gonzalez at the Emirates Arena in Glasgow, a fight broadcast on Sky Sports. Burns won the fight in the ninth round after being outboxed in the first 6 rounds however the fight took a drastic change in round 7 where Burns was hurt before firing back in true championship style, Burns dominated rounds 8 & 9. Gonzalez refused to come out for the tenth round citing a damaged wrist for pulling out of the fight despite being 87–84 ahead on all 3 cards.

==== Burns vs. Beltrán, Crawford ====
Burns's promoter Eddie Hearn announced that Burns would fight again on 7 September 2013 against Ray Beltrán of Mexico at the Scottish Exhibition and Conference Centre. Burns was knocked down in the 8th round. The bout ended in a controversial split-decision draw as the vast majority of observers believed Beltran had won and the decision was seen as one of the worst decisions of 2013. The draw meant Burns retained his WBO lightweight title. It was confirmed after the fight that Beltran had broken Burns's jaw as early as the second round.

After having surgery the following day it was unsure when, and if, Burns would be able to fight again, but after the surgery was successful, Burns expressed interest in a rematch with Beltran. However, the WBO installed Terence Crawford as Burns's mandatory challenger and the bout took place on 1 March 2014 in Scotland. Crawford defeated Burns by unanimous decision, boxing well on the outside and picking his shots to win the WBO lightweight title. Burns earned a career high £500,000 for the fight.

==== Burns vs. Zlatičanin ====
On 27 June 2014 Burns fought Dejan Zlatičanin at the Braehead Arena in Glasgow. It was an eliminator fight and for the WBC International title. Burns lost the fight to Zlaticanin on a split points decision after having been knocked down in Round 1, this was his second consecutive loss.

=== Light-welterweight ===
After the loss to Zlatičanin on 27 June 2014, Burns promoter Eddie Hearn confirmed on 4 July 2014 that he would have a "Make or Break" 10 round fight in a move to the light-welterweight division. This was on 4 October 2014 at the First Direct Arena in Leeds, giving Burns a break from fighting in Scotland, the fight was originally scheduled for 13 September 2014 in Manchester but was moved due to an elbow injury Burns sustained in the Zlaticanin fight. Burns defeated French journeyman Alexandre Lepelley via points on his light-welterweight debut on 4 October 2014.

==== Burns vs. Figueroa Jr. ====
In his US debut, Burns faced off against undefeated former WBC lightweight champion Omar Figueroa Jr. on 9 May 2015 in Hidalgo, Texas. In a fight that saw both men land clean hard punches throughout was over shadowed by disgraceful refereeing as 2 points were deducted from Burns for holding and for repeatedly moving both boxers hands whilst they were in a dominant position within the clinch. Burns lost a controversial decision as the judges in Texas scored the fight widely to the home fighter. Two judges scored the fight 116–110 and the third had it 117–109.

Burns then went on to win two consecutive fights, firstly with a TKO victory against Prince Ofotsu on 1 August 2015 in Hull then winning via KO against Josh King on 7 November 2015 in Liverpool.

==== Burns vs. Di Rocco, Relikh ====
It was confirmed on 15 March 2016 that Burns would fight Italian boxer Michele di Rocco for the vacant WBA (Regular) light-welterweight title at the SSE Hydro in Glasgow on 28 May 2016. Burns dominated from start to finish with his jab and right cross, knocking his opponent down on the third and stopping him in the eighth in front of a packed crowd.

WBA ordered Burns to defend his Regular title against their Inter-Continental champion Kiryl Relikh (21–0, 19 KOs) of Belarus. The official announcement was made with The SSE Hydro in Glasgow as the venue and 7 October as the date. After starting off slow in the first couple of rounds, Burns used his experience and took the fight to 12 rounds. Burns seemed to take some shots which seemed to shake him for split seconds as he carried on and showed that he is a master of pacing 12 round fights. Burns needed good movement as Relikh switched to and from the southpaw stance which helped cut the distance. At the end of the fight, the three judges scored the fight with scores of 116–112 twice and a rather wide 118–110. Some pundits ringside including Relikh's trainer Ricky Hatton believed the wide scoring was harsh due to the fact there was constant back and forth action. With Burns retaining the world title paved the way for a fight in December against former champion Adrien Broner, possibly in the US.

==== Burns vs. Indongo ====
In late December, there were talks for a potential fight between Burns and IBF, and IBO champion Julius Indongo (21–0, 11 KOs). Indongo acquired the two titles after knocking out then undefeated Eduard Troyanovsky in less than a minute on 3 December. In January 2017, Freddie Roach named Burns a potential opponent for Filipino legend Manny Pacquiao for 23 April. On 9 January, Burns's manager Tommy Morrison confirmed a deal was being put together for Burns to fight Indongo in April at The SSE Hydro in Glasgow. On 11 January, Sky Sports confirmed a deal was reached for Burns and Indongo in a unification title bout on 15 April 2017. The WBA (Regular), IBF, and IBO titles would be at stake. This was Scotland's first ever unification fight. Burns lost the fight via a one-sided unanimous decision with wide scores of 120–108, 118–110 and 116–112. In the last two rounds, Burns hit the canvas three times, but these were ruled as a slip. Following the defeat, Burns praised Indongo, "He was so so awkward. He was a lot better than we thought he was going to be. He can hit as well." He also said that he wouldn't retire.

=== Return to lightweight ===
==== Burns vs. Crolla ====
On 7 July 2017, STV news reported there was talks between Burns and fellow Brit Anthony Crolla (31–6–3, 13 KOs) about a potential all-British fight towards the end of 2017. Talks suggested a fight would likely take place in Manchester or Glasgow at light-welterweight. A provisional date of 14 October 2017 was being considered. Both boxers tweeted a day earlier confirming their interest in the fight. Burns told Sky Sports, he agreed to the fight straight away when he first heard about the speculations. He said, both he and Crolla were in the same position, coming off losses. At the time, Burn's compatriot Josh Taylor had been calling him out for an all Scottish showdown. Crolla admitted the fight would be a 'make or break' fight for both of them and could steer the defeated boxer into retirement, whereas the winner could line himself up for another potential world title fight. On 7 August 2017, it was confirmed by Eddie Hearn that a deal had been reached between Crolla and Burns for a fight to take place at lightweight on 7 October, live on Sky Sports. Manchester Arena was confirmed as the venue, marking it the first time Burns would fight in Manchester. Hearn spoke to Sky Sports about the fight, "What a fight between two great warriors. Both Anthony and Ricky are in similar places in the careers and they know that this absolute must-win. Knowing these two like I do this is going to be a fight until the finishing bell with neither taking a backward step. It's an all-British super fight between two great [former] world champions." Crolla won the fight via 12 round unanimous decision. In the end, the three judges' scored the fight 116–113, 117–112, 116–114. Sky pundits at ringside had either Crolla winning or a draw, however none believed Burns had done enough to warrant a win. Crolla was the busier fighter throwing much more than Burns and focused a lot of his body shots. Burns made Crolla miss a lot with his movement and looked to land cleaner and accurate punches. Both fighters embraced in the end, as they had shown mutual respect for one another in the build up. In the post fight, Crolla said, "I thought I definitely did enough. He just kept coming, he gave me a very tough fight, but I thought my quality shots won it." Burns felt he did enough to win the fight saying, "Although it was close, I thought I did enough. thought I landed the cleaner shots. In my eyes, I thought I just edged it." Crolla also said he would be willing to travel to Glasgow for a rematch.

==== Burns vs. Njegac, Cardle ====
On 26 May 2018, Burns's 50th professional fight was announced to take place at the Metro Radio Arena in Newcastle on 16 June on a card co-headlined by Josh Kelly and Lewis Ritson. It was the first time Burns fought in Newcastle. In a scheduled 6-round bout, Burns retired his Croatian opponent Ivan Njegac after round 4. After the bout, Burns stated he intended to carry on boxing.

On 3 November, at just one weeks notice, Burns stepped in to replace Joe Cordina and fight Scott Cardle (23–2–1, 7 KOs) on 10 November 2018 at the Manchester Arena. Cordina withdrew from the bout after picking up an injury. Prior to stepping in, Burns was originally scheduled to appear on a Matchroom USA card in Kansas, US, on 17 November. Burns dominated and then knocked out Cardle in round 3 to continue his comeback in 2018. It was a right hand which sent Cardle to the canvas. Cardle managed to beat the count, but referee Mark Lyson called a halt to the about at 2:06 of round 3. Although Burns did not call anyone out in the prost-fight interview, he stated he was chasing big fights in 2019.

==== Burns vs. Selby ====
On 26 October 2019 at The O2 Arena in London, Burns faced former world champion Lee Selby. In a foul-filled fight, Selby managed to edge Burns via majority decision, winning 116–112 and 116–113 on two of the scorecards, while the third judge scored the fight a draw, 115–115.

=== Comeback ===
After more than two years away from the competitive boxing ring, Burns returned to action with a unanimous decision win over Emiliano Dominguez at Rainton Meadows Arena in Newcastle on 18 December 2021.

He followed this up by stopping Willie Limond in the eighth round of their bout at Braehead Arena in Glasgow on 1 September 2023.

== Professional boxing record ==
54 fights	45 wins	8 losses
By knockout	17	0
By decision	28	8
Draws	1	

No.	Result	Record	Opponent	Type	Round, time	Date	Location	Notes
54	Win	45–8–1	Willie Limond	TKO	8 (12), 3:00	1 Sep 2023	Braehead Arena, Glasgow, Scotland	
53	Win	44–8–1	Emiliano Dominguez	UD	10	18 Dec 2021	Rainton Meadows Arena, Newcastle, England	
52	Loss	43–8–1	Lee Selby	MD	12	26 Oct 2019	The O2 Arena, London, England	
51	Win	43–7–1	Scott Cardle	TKO	3 (10), 2:06	10 Nov 2018	Manchester Arena, Manchester, England	
50	Win	42–7–1	Ivan Njegac	RTD	4 (6), 3:00	16 Jun 2018	Metro Radio Arena, Newcastle, England	
49	Loss	41–7–1	Anthony Crolla	UD	12	7 Oct 2017	Manchester Arena, Manchester, England	
48	Loss	41–6–1	Julius Indongo	UD	12	15 Apr 2017	The SSE Hydro, Glasgow, Scotland	Lost WBA light-welterweight title; For IBF and IBO light-welterweight titles
47	Win	41–5–1	Kiryl Relikh	UD	12	7 Oct 2016	The SSE Hydro, Glasgow, Scotland	Retained WBA light-welterweight title
46	Win	40–5–1	Michele di Rocco	TKO	8 (12), 1:57	28 May 2016	The SSE Hydro, Glasgow, Scotland	Won vacant WBA light-welterweight title
45	Win	39–5–1	Josh King	KO	11 (12), 0:54	7 Nov 2015	Echo Arena, Liverpool, England	Won vacant WBO International lightweight title
44	Win	38–5–1	Prince Ofotsu	TKO	5 (8), 1:43	1 Aug 2015	Craven Park, Hull, England	
43	Loss	37–5–1	Omar Figueroa Jr.	UD	12	9 May 2015	State Farm Arena, Hidalgo, Texas, US	
42	Win	37–4–1	Alexandre Lepelley	PTS	8	4 Oct 2014	First Direct Arena, Leeds, England	
41	Loss	36–4–1	Dejan Zlatičanin	SD	12	27 Jun 2014	Braehead Arena, Glasgow, Scotland	For vacant WBC International lightweight title
40	Loss	36–3–1	Terence Crawford	UD	12	1 Mar 2014	Exhibition and Conference Centre, Glasgow, Scotland	Lost WBO lightweight title
39	Draw	36–2–1	Ray Beltrán	SD	12	7 Sep 2013	Exhibition and Conference Centre, Glasgow, Scotland	Retained WBO lightweight title
38	Win	36–2	Jose Gonzalez	RTD	9 (12), 3:00	11 May 2013	Emirates Arena, Glasgow, Scotland	Retained WBO lightweight title
37	Win	35–2	Kevin Mitchell	TKO	4 (12), 2:59	22 Sep 2012	Exhibition and Conference Centre, Glasgow, Scotland	Retained WBO lightweight title
36	Win	34–2	Paulus Moses	UD	12	10 Mar 2012	Braehead Arena, Glasgow, Scotland	Retained WBO lightweight title
35	Win	33–2	Michael Katsidis	UD	12	5 Nov 2011	Wembley Arena, London, England	Won WBO interim lightweight title
34	Win	32–2	Nicky Cook	TKO	1 (12), 1:33	16 Jul 2011	Echo Arena, Liverpool, England	Retained WBO super-featherweight title
33	Win	31–2	Joseph Laryea	RTD	7 (12), 3:00	12 Mar 2011	Braehead Arena, Glasgow, Scotland	Retained WBO super-featherweight title
32	Win	30–2	Andreas Evensen	UD	12	4 Dec 2010	Braehead Arena, Glasgow, Scotland	Retained WBO super-featherweight title
31	Win	29–2	Román Martínez	UD	12	4 Sep 2010	Kelvin Hall, Glasgow, Scotland	Won WBO super-featherweight title
30	Win	28–2	Youssef Al Hamidi	PTS	8	15 May 2010	Boleyn Ground, London, England	
29	Win	27–2	Kevin O'Hara	UD	12	19 Jun 2009	Bellahouston Sport Centre, Glasgow, Scotland	Retained Commonwealth super-featherweight title
28	Win	26–2	Michael Gomez	TKO	7 (12), 0:47	27 Mar 2009	Bellahouston Sport Centre, Glasgow, Scotland	Retained Commonwealth super-featherweight title
27	Win	25–2	Yakubu Amidu	TKO	7 (12), 2:57	14 Nov 2008	Kelvin Hall, Glasgow, Scotland	Retained Commonwealth super-featherweight title
26	Win	24–2	Osumanu Akaba	UD	12	26 Sep 2008	York Hall, London, England	Won vacant Commonwealth super-featherweight title
25	Win	23–2	Gheorghe Ghiompirica	PTS	10	17 May 2008	Thistle Hotel, Glasgow, Scotland	
24	Win	22–2	Billy Smith	PTS	4	22 Mar 2008	International Arena, Cardiff, Wales	
23	Win	21–2	Silence Saheed	TKO	3 (6), 2:45	22 Feb 2008	Dalziel Park Hotel, Motherwell, Scotland	
22	Win	20–2	Billy Smith	PTS	6	15 Dec 2007	Meadowbank Stadium, Edinburgh, Scotland	
21	Win	19–2	Youssef Al Hamidi	PTS	6	3 Nov 2007	Millennium Stadium, Cardiff, Wales	
20	Win	18–2	Ben Odamattey	PTS	8	26 Oct 2007	SeeWoo Restaurant, Glasgow, Scotland	
19	Win	17–2	Frederic Bonifai	TKO	5 (8), 2:45	13 Oct 2007	York Hall, London, England	
18	Win	16–2	Ernie Smith	PTS	6	15 Sep 2007	Linwood Leisure Centre, Paisley, Scotland	
17	Loss	15–2	Carl Johanneson	UD	12	9 Feb 2007	Town Hall, Leeds, England	For British super-featherweight title
16	Win	15–1	Wladimir Borov	PTS	8	4 Nov 2006	Kelvin Hall, Glasgow, Scotland	
15	Win	14–1	Adolphe Avadja	TKO	5 (8), 2:14	1 Apr 2006	York Hall, London, England	
14	Loss	13–1	Alex Arthur	UD	12	18 Feb 2006	Meadowbank Stadium, Edinburgh, Scotland	For European, British, and Commonwealth super-featherweight titles
13	Win	13–0	Alan Temple	PTS	4	23 Jul 2005	Meadowbank Stadium, Edinburgh, Scotland	
12	Win	12–0	Haider Ali	PTS	8	17 Jun 2005	Kelvin Hall, Glasgow, Scotland	
11	Win	11–0	Buster Dennis	PTS	6	8 Apr 2005	Meadowbank Stadium, Edinburgh, Scotland	
10	Win	10–0	Graham Earl	PTS	8	25 Feb 2005	Wembley Conference Centre, London, England	
9	Win	9–0	Colin Bain	PTS	6	12 Dec 2004	Marriott Hotel, Glasgow, Scotland	
8	Win	8–0	Jeff Thomas	PTS	4	29 Oct 2004	Braehead Arena, Glasgow, Scotland	
7	Win	7–0	Daniel Thorpe	PTS	6	8 Oct 2004	Marriott Hotel, Glasgow, Scotland	
6	Win	6–0	Nono Junior	PTS	8	8 Dec 2002	Thistle Hotel, Glasgow, Scotland	
5	Win	5–0	Neil Murray	TKO	2 (4), 0:36	19 Oct 2002	Braehead Arena, Glasgow, Scotland	
4	Win	4–0	Ernie Smith	PTS	6	6 Sep 2002	Thistle Hotel, Glasgow, Scotland	
3	Win	3–0	Gary Harrison	TKO	1 (4), 1:30	8 Jun 2002	Braehead Arena, Glasgow, Scotland	
2	Win	2–0	Peter Allen	PTS	6	15 Mar 2002	Thistle Hotel, Glasgow, Scotland	
1	Win	1–0	Woody Greenaway	PTS	4	20 Oct 2001	Kelvin Hall, Glasgow, Scotland	

== Titles in boxing ==
=== Major world titles ===
- WBO super-featherweight champion (130 lbs)
- WBO lightweight champion (135 lbs)
- WBA light-welterweight champion (140 lbs)

=== Interim world titles ===
- WBO interim lightweight champion (135 lbs)

=== Regional/International titles ===
- Commonwealth super-featherweight champion (130 lbs)
- WBO International lightweight champion (135 lbs)

== See also ==
- List of boxing triple champions

Sporting positions
Regional boxing titles
Vacant Title last held by Kevin Mitchell	Commonwealth super-featherweight champion 26 September 2008 – October 2010; Vacated	Vacant Title next held by Liam Walsh
Vacant Title last held by Diego Magdaleno	WBO International lightweight champion 7 November 2015 – March 2016; Vacated	Vacant Title next held by Isa Chaniev
World boxing titles
Preceded by Román Martínez	WBO super-featherweight champion 4 September 2010 – 13 September 2011; Vacated	Vacant Title next held by Adrien Broner
Vacant Title last held by Robert Guerrero	WBO lightweight champion Interim title 5 November 2011 – 26 January 2012; Promoted	Vacant
Preceded by Juan Manuel Márquez vacated	WBO lightweight champion 26 January 2012 – 1 March 2014	Succeeded by Terence Crawford
Vacant Title last held by Adrien Broner	WBA super-lightweight champion 28 May 2016 – 15 April 2017	Succeeded by Julius Indongo as Unified champion
