= Kell Brook vs. Frankie Gavin =

Boxing match

Rule Britannia
- Date: 30 May 2015
- Venue: The O2 Arena, Greenwich, London
- Title(s) on the line: IBF welterweight title

Tale of the tape
Boxer	(United Kingdom) Kell Brook	(United Kingdom) Frankie Gavin
Nickname	"The Special One"	"Funtime"
Hometown	Sheffield, South Yorkshire	Birmingham, West Midlands
Pre-fight record	34–0 (23 KO)	22–1 (13 KO)
Age	29 years	29 years, 8 months
Height	5 ft 9 in (175 cm)	5 ft 10 in (178 cm)
Weight	146 1/2 lb (66 kg)	146 lb (66 kg)
Style	Orthodox	Southpaw
Recognition	IBF; Welterweight Champion; The Ring; No. 1 Ranked Welterweight; TBRB; No. 4 Ranked Welterweight	IBF; No. 2 Ranked Welterweight

Result
- Brook defeated Gavin via 6th round TKO

Kell Brook vs. Frankie Gavin, billed as Rule Britannia, was a professional boxing match contested on 30 May 2015, for the IBF Welterweight championship.

== Background ==
After making the first defence of his IBF welterweight belt against Jo Jo Dan and after being unable to attract Amir Khan, Kell Brook agreed to face former British and Commonwealth champion, Frankie Gavin.

This was the first all British World Welterweight title bout for more than 100 years, since Matt Wells scored an 20-round decision victory over Tom McCormick at Sydney Stadium in 1914.

== The fights ==
=== Undercard ===
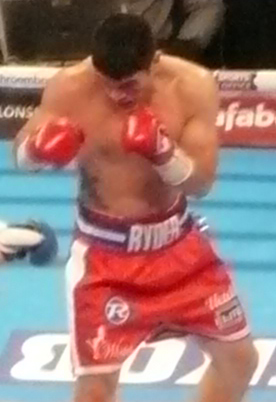
Ryder facing Blackwell

Dave Ryan survived two knockdowns before scoring a 9th-round TKO in his second bout with John Wayne Hibbert. Scott Cardle won the British lightweight title after a unanimous points decision over Craig Evans, Nick Blackwell upset John Ryder to win the British middleweight title and former world champion Nathan Cleverly scored a 24-second knockout of journeyman Tomas Man.

=== Gradovich vs Selby ===
In the first of three world title bouts, unbeaten IBF featherweight champion Evgeny Gradovich faced Lee Selby.

==== The fight ====
Selby consistently outboxed Gradovich throughout the bout, before a clash of heads left Gradovich cut by the right eye in the seventh. During the next round referee Deon Dwarte called for the ringside doctor to inspect the eye and the bout was quickly waved off. As the clash was accidental, the bout went to the scorecard who awarded Selby victory by unanimous technical decision with scores 79–73, 80-72 and 79–73.

==== Aftermath ====
Selby would dedicate the victory to his late brother Michael.

Preceded by vs. Jayson Vélez	Evgeny Gradovich's bouts 30 May 2015	Succeeded by vs. Aldimar Silva Santos
Preceded by vs. Joel Brunker	Lee Selby's bouts 30 May 2015	Succeeded by vs. Fernando Montiel

=== Linares vs Mitchell ===
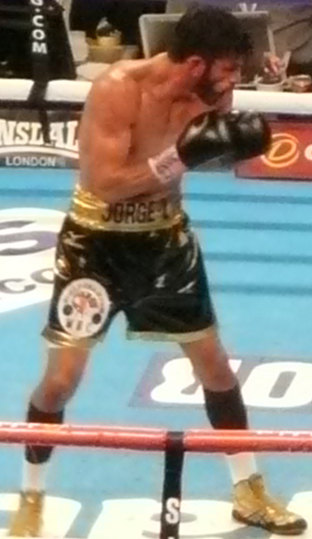
Linares in action against Mitchell

Selby's win was followed by WBC lightweight champion Jorge Linares making the first defence of his belt against Kevin Mitchell, who was having his third shot at a world title.

==== The fight ====
Linares was dropped in the fifth round with a right-left combination. By the eight Mitchell was badly cut above the left eye which had closed up. Mitchell was dropped in the tenth with a right hand, he beat the count but the referee stopped the bout. The cut was due to a clash of heads in round four, which also opened a cut on the side of Linares' head.

At the time of stoppage, Mitchell was ahead on two of the judges scorecards at 82–88 and 84–86. The third judge had it even at 85–85.

Preceded by vs. Javier Prieto	Jorge Linares's bouts 30 May 2015	Succeeded by vs. Ivan Cano
Preceded by vs. Daniel Estrada	Kevin Mitchell's bouts 30 May 2015	Succeeded by vs. Ismael Barroso

=== Joshua vs Johnson ===
In the chief support, 2012 Olympic gold medalist Anthony Joshua faced the durable former world title challenger Kevin Johnson.

Joshua had stopped all 12 of his previous opponents within 3 rounds, while Johnson was on a run of just 1 win in his last 6 bouts, but this included going the distance with the likes of Tyson Fury and Derek Chisora.

==== The fight ====
Joshua would dominate Johnson dropping him through the ropes in the first round. Johnson beat the count but a sustained barrage in the second round prompted the referee to wave the bout off. This was marked the first time Johnson had ever been stopped.

==== Aftermath ====
Steve Bunce, commentating for BBC Radio 5 Live said in the aftermath: "We've seen the future and the future is Anthony Joshua, if we were watching this in the early hours of the morning from the United States we'd be getting very excited. I don't want the post mortem to say Johnson was too old and too fat. I thought he would go the distance. The look on Johnson's face was one of shock."

Preceded by vs. Raphael Zumbano Love	Anthony Joshua's bouts 30 May 2015	Succeeded by vs. Dillian Whyte
Preceded by vs. Manuel Charr	Kevin Johnson's bouts 30 May 2015	Succeeded by vs. Terrell Jamal Woods

=== Main Event ===
Gavin used his awkward style to cause Brook some issues in the opening rounds, especially with a couple of sharp right-hand counters in the fourth, although Brook was largely in control of the action. However Brook's hard shots began taking their toll and by the fifth the challenger's face was beginning to mark up. Towards the end of the sixth round, Brook landed right hand followed by a pair of uppercuts which prompted the referee stepped in to end the fight.

== Aftermath ==
Plans for a summer or autumn bout with Khan didn't come together and Brook return to the ring in March 2016 against Kevin Bizier.

== Undercard ==
Confirmed bouts:

Winner	Loser	Weight division/title belt(s) disputed	Result
(United Kingdom) Anthony Joshua	(United States) Kevin Johnson	WBC International Heavyweight (10 rounds)	2nd-round TKO.
(Venezuela) Jorge Linares	(United Kingdom) Kevin Mitchell	WBC World Lightweight	10th-round TKO.
(United Kingdom) Lee Selby	(Russia) Evgeny Gradovich	IBF World Featherweight	8th round TD.
(United Kingdom) Nathan Cleverly	(Czech Republic) Tomas Man	Light Heavyweight (8 rounds)	1st-round TKO.
(United Kingdom) Nick Blackwell	(United Kingdom) John Ryder	British Middleweight	7th-round TKO.
(United Kingdom) Scott Cardle	(United Kingdom) Craig Evans	British Lightweight	Unanimous decision.
(United Kingdom) Dave Ryan	(United Kingdom) John Wayne Hibbert	Commonwealth & WBC International Light welterweight	9th-round TKO.
(United Kingdom) Lucien Reid	(Slovakia) Elemir Rafael	Featherweight (4 rounds)	4th-round TKO.

== Broadcasting ==
Country	Broadcaster
United Kingdom	Sky Sports

Preceded by vs. Jo Jo Dan	Kell Brook's bouts 30 May 2015	Succeeded by vs. Kevin Bizier
Preceded by vs. Bogdan Mitic	Frankie Gavin's bouts 30 May 2015	Succeeded by vs. Ivo Gogosevic
