= Emmanuel Tagoe =

Ghanaian boxer

Personal information
- Nickname: The Gameboy
- Born: 10 January 1989 (age 37) Accra, Ghana
- Height: 5 ft 8 in (173 cm)
- Weight: Featherweight; Super-featherweight; Lightweight

Boxing career
- Reach: 70 in (178 cm)
- Stance: Orthodox

Boxing record
- Total fights: 34
- Wins: 32
- Win by KO: 15
- Losses: 2

Emmanuel Tagoe (born 10 January 1989) is a Ghanaian professional boxer. He held the IBO lightweight title from 2016 to 2018.

== Professional career ==
Tagoe made his professional debut on 19 June 2004, losing by fifth-round technical knockout (TKO) against Lante Addy in Accra, Ghana.

After compiling a record of 26–1 (13 KOs) he faced former world champion Mzonke Fana for the vacant IBO lightweight title on 2 December 2016 at the Bukom Boxing Arena in Accra. In a fight which saw Tagoe score two knockdowns in the first round, he went on to win via shutout unanimous decision (UD) with two judges scoring the bout 120–106 and the third scoring it 120–107. Fana collapsed in his corner after the final bell, requiring immediate medical attention from the ringside doctors. He was taken to the hospital before the results were announced.

On April 9, 2022, Tagoe lost by a wide unanimous decision after twelve rounds to Ryan Garcia at the Alamodome in San Antonio, Texas, with scores of 119-110 (twice) and 118–109 against Tagoe. Garcia dominated the fight, but didn't get the knockout he had predicted.

Tagoe agreed to a lightweight division fight against highly rated American prospect Keyshawn Davis on April 8, 2024, in Newark, New Jersey however Tagoe never signed a contract and his team informed Top Rank that he will not go through with the fight for undisclosed reasons.

== Professional boxing record ==
34 fights	32 wins	2 losses
By knockout	15	1
By decision	17	1

No.	Result	Record	Opponent	Type	Round, time	Date	Location	Notes
34	Loss	32–2	Ryan Garcia	UD	12	9 Apr 2022	Alamodome, San Antonio, Texas, U.S.	
33	Win	32–1	Mason Menard	MD	10	27 Nov 2020	Seminole Hard Rock Hotel & Casino, Hollywood, Florida, U.S.	
31	Win	31–1	Ishmael Aryeetey	TKO	6 (10)	20 Jul 2019	Old Kingsway Building, Accra, Ghana	
31	Win	30–1	Vyacheslav Gusev	UD	12	23 Feb 2019	Bukom Boxing Arena, Accra, Ghana	Won vacant IBF International and WBO Global lightweight titles
30	Win	29–1	Paulus Moses	UD	12	20 Oct 2018	Bukom Boxing Arena, Accra, Ghana	Won vacant WBO Africa lightweight title
29	Win	28–1	David Saucedo	TKO	10 (12)	27 Jan 2018	Bukom Boxing Arena, Accra, Ghana	Retained IBO lightweight title
28	Win	27–1	Mzonke Fana	UD	12	2 Dec 2016	Bukom Boxing Arena, Accra, Ghana	Won vacant IBO lightweight title
27	Win	26–1	Carlo Magali	TKO	9 (12)	15 Jul 2016	Accra Sports Stadium, Accra, Ghana	Retained WBA International lightweight title
26	Win	25–1	Allan Kamote	TKO	1 (12)	20 Nov 2015	Accra Sports Stadium, Accra, Ghana	Retained WBA International lightweight title
25	Win	24–1	Joebert Delos Reyes	TKO	4 (12), 2:45	24 Apr 2015	Accra Sports Stadium, Accra, Ghana	Won vacant WBA International lightweight title
24	Win	23–1	Sadiki Momba	TKO	6 (12)	26 Dec 2014	Accra Sports Stadium, Accra, Ghana	
23	Win	22–1	Gerardo Robles	RTD	9 (12), 3:00	9 Aug 2013	Morongo Casino, Resort & Spa, Cabazon, California, US	Won vacant IBF Inter-Continental super-featherweight title
22	Win	21–1	Ronald Pontillas	MD	12	26 Apr 2013	Accra Sports Stadium, Accra, Ghana	Won vacant WBA International and WBO Africa super-featherweight titles
21	Win	20–1	George Ashie	MD	12	10 Nov 2012	Accra Sports Stadium, Accra, Ghana	Won vacant WBA International lightweight title
20	Win	19–1	Miguel Leonardo Caceres	UD	10	25 Feb 2012	Accra Sports Stadium, Accra, Ghana	
19	Win	18–1	Oscar Bravo	UD	12	25 Jun 2011	Accra International Conference Centre, Accra, Ghana	Won vacant IBF Inter-Continental super-featherweight title
18	Win	17–1	Samuel Kamau	TKO	1 (12), 1:13	31 Jul 2010	Ohene Djan Sports Stadium, Accra, Ghana	Retained WBO Africa super-featherweight title
17	Win	16–1	Ismaila Adonaba	TKO	1 (8)	20 Feb 2010	Jubilee Pool House, Accra, Ghana	
16	Win	15–1	Thomson Makwana	UD	12	6 Feb 2010	Ohene Djan Sports Stadium, Accra, Ghana	Won vacant WBO Africa super-featherweight title
15	Win	14–1	Patrick Okine	UD	12	12 Sep 2009	Globe Cinema, Accra, Ghana	Retained Ghanaian featherweight title
14	Win	13–1	Imurana Bozo	TKO	2 (8)	30 May 2009	Globe Cinema, Accra, Ghana	
13	Win	12–1	Aminu Turkson	TKO	3 (6)	2 Nov 2008	Venus Printing Press, Accra, Ghana	
12	Win	11–1	Isaac Aryee	KO	10	16 Nov 2007	Azumah Nelson Sports Complex, Accra, Ghana	
11	Win	10–1	Abdul Malik Jabir	TD	10 (12), 3:00	12 Aug 2007	Mantse Agbona House, Accra, Ghana	Won Ghanaian featherweight title
10	Win	9–1	Daniel Tetteh	MD	8	26 May 2007	Lebanon House, Accra, Ghana	
9	Win	8–1	Ishmael Aryeetey	UD	8	6 Jan 2007	Lebanon House, Accra, Ghana	
8	Win	7–1	Dan Quartey	UD	6	9 Dec 2006	Lebanon House, Accra, Ghana	
7	Win	6–1	Benjamin Tutu	KO	1	17 Nov 2006	Azumah Nelson Sports Complex, Accra, Ghana	
6	Win	5–1	Tico Tico	KO	1	9 Sep 2006	Teshie, Ghana	
5	Win	4–1	Martin Ahiadekey	UD	8	19 Nov 2005	Metro TV Studios, Accra, Ghana	
4	Win	3–1	Odalai Lamptey	UD	8	16 Jul 2005	Metro TV Studios, Accra, Ghana	
3	Win	2–1	Isaac Aryee	PTS	8	18 Jun 2005	Metro TV Studios, Accra, Ghana	
2	Win	1–1	Alfred Quaye	TKO	4 (8)	21 Aug 2004	Metro TV Studios, Accra, Ghana	
1	Loss	0–1	Lante Addy	TKO	5 (8)	19 Jun 2004	Accra, Ghana	

Sporting positions
Regional boxing titles
Vacant Title last held by Abdul Malik Jabir	Ghanaian featherweight champion 12 August 2007 – January 2010	Vacant Title next held by Alfred Tetteh
Inaugural champion	WBO Africa super-bantamweight champion 6 February 2010 – January 2010	Vacant Title next held by Maxwell Awuku
Vacant Title last held by Kevin Mitchell	IBF Inter-Continental super-featherweight champion 25 June 2011 – June 2012	Vacant Title next held by Antonio de Vitis
Vacant Title last held by Samir Ziani	WBA International lightweight champion 10 November 2012 – March 2013	Vacant Title next held by Bahodir Mamadjonov
Inaugural champion	WBA International super-featherweight champion 26 April 2013 – October 2014	Vacant Title next held by Dardan Zanunaj
Vacant Title last held by Osumana Akaba	WBO Africa super-featherweight champion 26 April 2013 – November 2014	Vacant Title next held by Aphiwe Mboyiya
Vacant Title last held by Antonio de Vitis	IBF Inter-Continental super-featherweight champion 9 August 2014 – March 2015	Vacant Title next held by Yavuz Erturk
Vacant Title last held by Eduard Troyanovsky	WBA International lightweight champion 24 April 2015 – May 2016	Vacant Title next held by Ray Beltrán
Vacant Title last held by George Ashie	WBO Africa lightweight champion 20 October 2018 – January 2019	Vacant
Inaugural champion	WBO Global lightweight champion 22 February 2019 – June 2019	Vacant Title next held by Yang Yongqiang
Vacant Title last held by Aik Shakhnazaryan	IBF International lightweight champion 23 February 2019 – May 2019	Vacant Title next held by Jacob Ng
Minor world boxing titles
Vacant Title last held by Xolisani Ndongeni	IBO lightweight champion 2 December 2016 – 13 June 2018; Stripped	Vacant
