= David Brophy =

David Brophy may refer to:

- David Brophy (conductor) (born 1972), Irish conductor
- David Brophy (boxer) (born 1990), Scottish boxer
- David Brophy (historian), Australian historian
