= Iván Cano =

Iván Cano may refer to:

- Iván Cano (boxer) (born 1987), Mexican boxer
- Iván Cano (long jumper) (born 1995), Spanish long jumper
