= Anthony Joshua vs Gary Cornish =

Boxing match

Heavy Duty
- Date: 12 September 2015
- Venue: The O2 Arena, Greenwich, London
- Title(s) on the line: WBC International, and vacant Commonwealth heavyweight titles

Tale of the tape
Boxer	(United Kingdom) Anthony Joshua	(United Kingdom) Gary Cornish
Nickname	AJ	"Highlander"
Hometown	Watford, Hertfordshire	Inverness, Highland
Pre-fight record	13–0 (13 KO)	21–0 (12 KO)
Age	25 years, 10 months	28 years, 5 months
Height	6 ft 6 in (198 cm)	6 ft 7 in (201 cm)
Weight	249 lb (113 kg)	256 lb (116 kg)
Style	Orthodox	Orthodox
Recognition	WBC; No. 2 Ranked Heavyweight; WBO; No. 3 Ranked Heavyweight; IBF; No. 12 Ranked Heavyweight; WBA; No. 13 Ranked Heavyweight; WBC International heavyweight champion	IBO Inter-Continental heavyweight champion

Result
- Joshua defeated Cornish in the first-round by TKO

Anthony Joshua vs. Gary Cornish, billed as Heavy Duty, was a professional boxing match contested on 12 September 2015, for the Commonwealth and WBC International heavyweight championship. The bout took place at The O2 Arena in London.

Joshua defeated Cornish, adding the Commonwealth title to his WBC International title via first-round technical knockout (TKO).

== Background ==
Both fighters last fought in May 2015; Cornish scoring a fourth-round TKO win over Zoltan Csala to capture the IBO Inter-Continental title and Joshua scoring a second-round TKO over former world title challenger Kevin Johnson–the first stoppage loss of Johnson's career–to retain his WBC International title.

After Lucas Browne relinquished the Commonwealth title in order to face WBA (Regular) champion Ruslan Chagaev, the Commonwealth Boxing Council ordered Joshua vs. Cornish for the vacant title, with the fight scheduled to take place on 12 September at The O2 Arena in London, live on Sky Sports.

Joshua was ranked 2nd by the WBC, 3rd by the WBO, 12th by the IBF and 13th by the WBA.

== The fights ==
=== Undercard ===
The preliminary bouts saw wins for, among others, prospects Ohara Davies, Ted Cheeseman and Reece Bellotti. The first featured bout saw Charlie Edwards outpoint English flyweight champion Louis Norman.

=== Whyte vs. Minto ===
This was followed by unbeaten heavyweight contender Dillian Whyte facing American veteran Brian Minto, with the WBC International Silver title on the line.

==== The fight ====
Whyte knocked down Minto in the 1st round before knocking him out in the 3rd.

Preceded by vs. Irineu Beato Costa Junior	Dillian Whyte's bouts 12 September 2015	Succeeded by vs. Anthony Joshua
Preceded by vs. Israel Adesanya	Brian Minto's bouts 12 September 2015	Succeeded by vs. Edmund Gerber

=== Ryan vs. Hibbert III ===
The chief support saw Commonwealth and WBC International Light welterweight champion Dave Ryan have a trilogy bout with John Wayne Hibbert. Ryan had twice before bested Hibbert winning a points decision in March 2013 and stopping him in the 9th round in May 2015.

==== The fight ====
Ryan was in control from the opening bell, knocking down Hibbert in the 6th round. Hibbert began to exert pressure from rounds 7 through 9. In the 10th, after a right hook from Hibbert, Ryan pulled backwards with his hand on his back, visibly in pain. After a momentary pause, Hibbert attacked with a three punch combination to the champion's body, forcing Ryan to go down to the canvas on one knee, informing the referee his "back had gone". He managed to rise to his feet, only to be met by a flurry of punches from Hibbert to prompt referee Ian John Lewis to step in and call a halt to the contest, handing Hibbert a 9th-round TKO victory.

=== Main Event ===
With both men showing intent to fight from the opening bell, Joshua landed a solid right hand a little under a minute into the fight, dropping the Scottish challenger to the canvas. Cornish made it to his feet before the referee's count of ten, only to be met by a sustained attack from Joshua. On the receiving end of another right hand, Cornish was down for a second time halfway through the round. He again made it to his feet just before the count of ten on unsteady legs, prompting referee Victor Loughlin to wave off the fight, giving Joshua his first major regional title via first-round TKO.

== Aftermath ==
Immediately after the fight, promoter Eddie Hearn revealed a deal was in place for Joshua to take on undefeated rival Dillian Whyte.

== Fight card ==
Confirmed bouts:

Weight Class		vs.		Method	Round	Time	Notes
Heavyweight	Anthony Joshua (c)	def.	Gary Cornish	TKO	1/12	1:37	^{Note 1}
Super-lightweight	John Wayne Hibbert (c)	def.	Dave Ryan	TKO	10/12	1:43	^{Note 2}
Heavyweight	Dillian Whyte	def.	Brian Minto	TKO	3/12	0:26	^{Note 3}
Flyweight	Charlie Edwards	def.	Louis Norman (c)	UD	10		^{Note 4}
Preliminary bouts
Featherweight	Reece Bellotti	def.	Adel Hadjouis	PTS	6
Super-lightweight	Cassius Connor	def.	Ricky Boylan	PTS	10
Super-lightweight	Tommy Martin	def.	Michael Devine	TKO	10/12		^{Note 5}
Light-heavyweight	Jake Ball	def.	Haidar Sadiq	TKO	1/4	0:25
Light-middleweight	Ted Cheeseman	def.	Gabor Ambrus	TKO	2/4	0:54
Super-lightweight	Ohara Davies	def.	Dame Seck	TKO	3/6	2:41
Super-bantamweight	Lucien Reid	def.	Samuel Escobar	PTS	4

^Note 1 For WBC International, and vacant Commonwealth heavyweight titles
^Note 2 For Commonwealth and WBC International super-lightweight titles
^Note 3 For vacant WBC International Silver heavyweight title
^Note 4 For English flyweight title
^Note 5 For vacant WBA Continental super-lightweight title

== Broadcasting ==
Country	Broadcaster
United Kingdom	Sky Sports

Preceded by vs. Kevin Johnson	Anthony Joshua' bouts 12 September 2015	Succeeded by vs. Dillian Whyte
Preceded by vs. Zoltan Csala	Gary Cornish's bouts 12 September 2015	Succeeded by vs. Kamil Sokolowski
