= Ryan Barrett =

English boxer (born 1982)

Personal information
- Nicknames: Mr Attitude; 666
- Nationality: Great Britain
- Born: Ryan Barrett; 27 December 1982 (age 43)
- Weight: Featherweight: Super featherweight; Lightweight; Light welterweight; Welterweight

Boxing career
- Stance: Southpaw

Boxing record
- Total fights: 44
- Wins: 30
- Win by KO: 6
- Losses: 11
- Draws: 3
- No contests: 0

Ryan Barrett (born 27 December 1982) is an English boxing coach and former professional boxer.

== Early life and amateur career ==
Ryan Barrett began boxing at the age of seven and developed his skills at Eltham ABC. He went on to establish a successful amateur career, representing both Eltham & District and England.

Representing Eltham & District, Barrett recorded 60 wins in 75 bouts. His amateur achievements included four national championships, English and international titles, as well as two Schoolboy Championship titles and two National Association of Boys Clubs (NABC) championships.

He also represented England in 12 international bouts, recording nine wins and three defeats. His performances in the amateur ranks led to his transition into professional boxing.

== Professional career ==
Barrett competed in 44 professional bouts, finishing his career with a record of 30 wins, 11 defeats and three draws. During his professional career, he won titles across several weight divisions, including the International Masters title at lightweight, the British Masters title at featherweight and the English title at super-featherweight.

Among his victories were wins over Gareth Wiltshaw, Jason Gonzalez and Martin Turner. He also faced a number of established opponents during his career, including Amir Khan, Femi Femetola, Willie Limond and Dierry Jean just to name a few.

Ryan won the International title with a victory over Mark Alexander and subsequently captured the English title against Femi Femetola. He also won the British Masters title after defeating Jamie McKeever.

One of the defining achievements of Barrett’s professional career came in Germany, where he won the World Boxing Union (WBU) world welterweight title. The victory was particularly significant as it avenged an earlier defeat to Geoffrey Munika.

Barrett retired from professional boxing in 2014 at the age of 31, after suffering two strokes. The strokes were caused by a blood clot in his brain which had travelled from his heart.

== Coaching career ==
Following his retirement from professional competition, Ryan moved into boxing coaching, continuing a family connection to the sport through his father.

He became head coach of the Cayman Islands national boxing team, guiding boxers to international medals and helping the team qualify for the 2018 Commonwealth Games on the Gold Coast, Australia. During his tenure, he was also involved in preparing athletes for world championships and Youth Commonwealth Games competition.

Ryan subsequently worked with a number of professional boxers, including Jordy Weiss, Djamel Dahou, Hovo Martirosyan and Maxime Beaussire.

Weiss, a former European Boxing Union (EBU) champion, also held the WBA Intercontinental and IBO Continental welterweight titles. Dahou was a former WBC Youth world champion, Martirosyan IBO intercontinental champion, while Beaussire challenged twice for the EBU title.

Other boxers coached by Ryan Barrett include Tom Smith, Jake Henty, Tiawo Mosuro, Didi Lemonnier, Daniel Francis and Jack Blencowe.

== Professional boxing record ==
| 44 fights | 30 wins | 11 losses |
|---|---|---|
| By knockout | 7 | 6 |
| By decision | 23 | 5 |
| Draws | 3 | |

| Result | Record | Opponent | Type | Round, time | Date | Location | Notes |
|---|---|---|---|---|---|---|---|
| Win | 30–11–3 | (Georgia (country)) Jaba Shalutashvili | PTS | 6 | 2014-04-11 | (United Kingdom) Camden Centre, Kings Cross | |
| Win | 29–11–3 | (Hungary) Gergo Vari | TKO | 3 (6) | 2014-02-21 | (United Kingdom) Camden Centre, Kings Cross | |
| Win | 28–11–3 | (Kenya) Geoffrey Munika | TKO | 3 (12) | 2013-12-07 | Heimathaus, Neuwied, Germany | Won vacant World Boxing Union (German Version) Welterweight Title |
| Win | 27–11–3 | (Poland) Arek Malek | PTS | 6 | 2013-09-27 | (United Kingdom) York Hall, Bethnal Green | |
| Win | 26–11–3 | (United Kingdom) William Warburton | PTS | 4 | 2013-07-27 | (United Kingdom) York Hall, Bethnal Green | |
| Loss | 25–11–3 | (Belgium) Jean Pierre Bauwens | TKO | 1 (12) | 2012-04-27 | Topsporthal Vlaanderen, Ghent, Belgium | |
| Loss | 25–10–3 | (Canada) Dierry Jean | TKO | 3 (8) | 2012-02-18 | (Canada) Bell Centre, Montreal | |
