= Carl Johanneson =

British former professional boxer (born 1978)

Personal information
- Nickname: Ingemar
- Nationality: British
- Born: 1 August 1978 (age 48) Leeds, England
- Height: 5 ft 5 in (165 cm)
- Weight: Super featherweight; Lightweight

Boxing career
- Stance: Southpaw

Boxing record
- Total fights: 39
- Wins: 32
- Win by KO: 20
- Losses: 7

Carl Johanneson (born 1 August 1978) is a British former professional boxer. He held the British super featherweight title from 2006 to 2008. His nickname, "Ingemar" is a nod to the famous Swedish boxer Ingemar Johansson and is the nephew of former Leeds United player Albert Johanneson. He served for four years in the Duke of Wellington's Regiment of the British Army.

== Career ==
Born in Leeds, England, Johanneson began his career in the United States, for coach John Durkin fighting a variety of journeyman-level competition with two exceptions; He lost a split decision to Koba Gogoladze in 2003, and ended Harold Grey's career with a TKO in the 5th of 8.

Johanneson began fighting out of England less than a year later, beginning the British phase of his career by TKO'ing Carl Greaves in 3 rounds at Wembley Stadium for the World Boxing Foundation (WBFo) super featherweight title.

In 2006, he beat Billy Corcoran to win the British super featherweight title.

On Friday 13 July 2007 Johanneson lost to Leva Kirakosayan in a fight for Kirakosayan's European (EBU) Super-Featherweight title. Johanneson returned to winning ways with a 6th round stoppage win over Michael Gomez in a fight for his British Title. On Saturday 8 March Carl lost his British Title to Kevin Mitchell in a 9th-round TKO.

Johanneson returned to the ring in 2010 and scored routine six round points wins over Youssef Al Hamidi, Arek Malek, and George Watson. On 5 March 2011 he fought for the British title once more, losing to Gary Sykes at the Huddersfield Sports Centre.

In September 2012 he faced Martin Gethin for the vacant IBF International lightweight title, Gethin stopping him in the eleventh round. His final fight was a points defeat to Craig Woodruff three months later.
