= Charles Martin vs. Anthony Joshua =

2016 boxing match

Charles Martin vs Anthony Joshua
- Date: 9 April 2016
- Venue: The O2 Arena, London, England
- Title(s) on the line: IBF Heavyweight Championship

Tale of the tape
Boxer	Charles Martin	Anthony Joshua
Nickname	Prince	AJ
Hometown	St. Louis, Missouri, U.S.	London, England
Pre-fight record	23–0–1 (21 KOs)	15–0 (15 KOs)
Age	29 years, 11 months	26 years, 5 months
Height	6 ft 5 in (196 cm)	6 ft 6 in (198 cm)
Weight	245 lb (111 kg)	244 lb (111 kg)
Style	Southpaw	Orthodox
Recognition	IBF; Heavyweight Champion; The Ring/TBRB; No. 9 Ranked Heavyweight	IBF; No. 4 Ranked Heavyweight; The Ring/TBRB; No. 8 Ranked Heavyweight

Result
- Joshua wins via 2nd-round knockout

Charles Martin vs. Anthony Joshua was a professional boxing match contested on 9 April 2016, for the IBF heavyweight championship. The bout took place at The O2 Arena, London.

Joshua defeated Martin via second-round knockout to claim the IBF heavyweight title.

== Background ==
On 12 December 2015, Anthony Joshua fought fellow British contender and rival Dillian Whyte in a grudge match for Joshua's Commonwealth and WBC International titles with the vacant British title also on the line. The bout took place at The O2 Arena in London, with Joshua winning via seventh-round technical knockout (TKO).

Following the IBF's decision to strip newly crowned unified champion Tyson Fury of their version of the heavyweight championship for failing to agree terms for a fight with mandatory challenger Vyacheslav Glazkov, due to contractual obligations to face former unified champion Wladimir Klitschko in a rematch, the IBF ordered a fight between Glazkov and No. 2 ranked contender Charles Martin. The bout took place on 16 January 2016 at the Barclays Center, New York, with Martin winning via third-round TKO after Glazkov suffered a knee injury and was unable to continue. One month after Martin's win over Glazkov, it was announced that Martin would make a voluntary defence of his newly acquired title against Joshua—who was the IBF's No. 4 ranked contender, with the bout scheduled to take place on 9 April at The O2 Arena in London. It was reported that Martin would earn a career high purse of £3.46m with potential total earnings in excess of £6m after PPV sales.

== The fights ==
=== Undercard ===
The preliminary bouts saw wins for Kamil Łaszczyk and Ted Cheeseman. The PPV card began with victories for Ohara Davies and former world title challenger Matthew Macklin. This was followed by Jamie McDonnell making the 4th defence of the WBA (Regular) bantamweight title against Fernando Vargas Parra. McDonnell stopped the unranked Parra in the 9th.

=== Selby vs. Hunter ===
The first major world title bout on the card saw IBF featherweight champion Lee Selby make the 3rd defence of his title against No. 1 contender Eric Hunter.

==== The fight ====
Selby started the fight strongly but a left hook from Hunter caught him and sent the champion down for the first time in his career. Hunter was unable to build any momentum from that however as Selby regrouped and took control from the back foot. In the 8th Hunter was deduced a point for low blows. The bout lasted the full 12 rounds and Selby was awarded a unanimous decision with scores of 115–111, 116–110, 116–110.

==== Aftermath ====
Speaking about the knockdown Selby said "When I got put down it was only a flash knockdown. I've got one of the best chins in the business and I wasn't hurt. He was a good fighter but I was too good for him."

Preceded by vs. Fernando Montiel	Lee Selby's bouts 9 April 2016	Succeeded by vs. Andoni Gago
Preceded by vs. Antonio Escalante	Eric Hunter's bouts 9 April 2016	Succeeded by vs. German Ivan Meraz

=== Benn vs. Boyanov ===
Next Conor Benn, the son of former WBC super middleweight champion Nigel Benn, made his professional debut against Ivaylo Boyanov, who Benn stopped in the 1st round.

=== Groves vs. Brophy ===
The chief support saw former world title challenger George Groves (WBC:2nd, IBF:10th) face unbeaten David Brophy for the vacant WBA International super middleweight title.

==== The fight ====
Groves was in control from the start, making good use of his jab. A gash began to open beneath Brophy's right eye in the 3rd. Groves dropped Brophy with a right to the liver in the 4th and while Scot just about beat the count, he looked on unsteady legs and referee Howard Foster stopped the contest.

==== Aftermath ====
With the win, Groves hoped to land either a fourth shot at a world title or a fight with either Martin Murray or Callum Smith.

Preceded by vs. Andrea Di Luisa	George Groves's bouts 9 April 2016	Succeeded by vs. Martin Murray
Preceded by vs. Vaidas Balciauskas	David Brophy's bouts 9 April 2016	Succeeded by vs. Kelvin Young

=== Main Event ===
Round one saw Martin on the back foot, only throwing a handful of punches and landing even less. Joshua applied minimal pressure, throwing probing jabs to the head and body and the occasional right hand. In the final 30 seconds, Joshua grazed Martin with a straight right hand which appeared to cause the champion to momentarily stumble. However, the instant replay between rounds showed Martin had tripped over one of the ringside advertisements. Martin began standing his ground in the first minute of round two, throwing more punches in that minute than the previous three. One minute into the round, Joshua slipped a right hand jab from southpaw Martin and landed a solid counter straight right to Martin's chin, dropping the champion to the canvas. Five seconds after Martin rose to his feet, he threw another jab which Joshua once again slipped and landed the same counter straight right hand to floor the champion for the second time. Martin was still down on one knee as referee Jean-Pierre Van Imschoot reached the count of nine. Martin quickly rose up to his feet as Van Imschoot waved off the fight at 1 minute and 32 seconds, giving Joshua a second-round knockout win to secure the IBF heavyweight title.

== Aftermath ==
With Joshua's win, he became the first British super heavyweight Olympic champion to win a professional heavyweight world title; the fourth boxer in history to win a professional heavyweight world title as the reigning Olympic champion; and the fifth-fastest to win a heavyweight world title at two years and six months. He was also just the sixth British born heavyweight champion following Bob Fitzsimmons, Lennox Lewis, Frank Bruno, David Haye and Tyson Fury. Martin also made the heavyweight history books by having the second-shortest reign as a heavyweight world champion at just 85 days, behind only Tony Tucker at 64 days.

== Fight card ==
Confirmed bouts:

Weight Class	Weight		vs.		Method	Round	Time	Notes
Heavyweight		Anthony Joshua	def.	Charles Martin (c)	KO	2/12	1:32	^{Note 1}
Super-middleweight		George Groves	def.	David Brophy	KO	4/12	0:47	^{Note 2}
Light-welterweight		Conor Benn	def.	Ivaylo Boyanov	TKO	1/4	2:07
Featherweight		Lee Selby (c)	def.	Eric Hunter	UD	12		^{Note 3}
Bantamweight		Jamie McDonnell (c)	def.	Fernando Vargas Parra	TKO	9/12	2:39	^{Note 4}
Middleweight		Matthew Macklin	def.	Brian Rose	MD	12		^{Note 5}
Lightweight		Ohara Davies	def.	Andy Keates	KO	4/10	0:31	^{Note 6}
Preliminary bouts
Light-welterweight		Ted Cheeseman	def.	Mario Petrov	TKO	4/6
Featherweight		Kamil Łaszczyk	def.	Ignac Kassai	PTS	6

^Note 1 For IBF heavyweight title
^Note 2 For vacant WBA International super-middleweight title
^Note 3 For IBF featherweight title
^Note 4 For WBA (Regular) bantamweight title
^Note 5 For IBF Inter-Continental middleweight title
^Note 6 For vacant English lightweight title

== Broadcasting ==
Country	Broadcaster
Argentina	TyC Sports
Australia	Fox Sports
Germany	SAT.1
Hungary	Sport 2
Mexico	Televisa
New Zealand	Sky Arena
Panama	RPC Channel 4
United Kingdom	Sky Sports
United States	Showtime

Preceded by vs. Vyacheslav Glazkov	Charles Martin' bouts 9 April 2016	Succeeded by vs. Byron Polley
Preceded by vs. Dillian Whyte	Anthony Joshua's bouts 9 April 2016	Succeeded by vs. Dominic Breazeale
