= Cleotis Pendarvis =

American boxer

Personal information
- Nickname: Mookie
- Nationality: American
- Born: June 22, 1986 (age 40) Los Angeles, California
- Height: 5 ft 10 in (178 cm)
- Weight: Welterweight

Boxing career
- Reach: 72 in (183 cm)
- Stance: Southpaw

Boxing record
- Total fights: 23
- Wins: 17
- Win by KO: 6
- Losses: 4
- Draws: 2
- No contests: 0

Cleotis Pendarvis (born June 22, 1986) is an American professional boxer.

== Professional career ==
In April 2006, he beat the veteran Ricardo Galindo by unanimous decision.

On September 15, 2006 Cleotis fought to a draw against David Rodela in Montebello, California.

Pendarvis was one of the sparring partners of Antonio Margarito for his November 13, 2010 fight with Manny Pacquiao.

=== Professional record ===
17 Wins (6 knockouts, 11 decisions), 4 Losses (2 knockouts, 2 decisions), 2 Draws
Res.	Record	Opponent	Type	Rd., Time	Date	Location	Notes
Loss	17-4-2	(Canada) Dierry Jean	TKO	4 (12), 2:01	2013-05-10	(United States) Buffalo Run Casino, Miami, Oklahoma	
Win	17-3-2	(United States) Michael Clark	RTD	5 (12), 3:00	2012-12-21	(United States) Florentine Gardens, Hollywood, California	Retained USBA light welterweight title
Win	16-3-2	(United States) Robert Frankel	UD	12	2012-05-25	(United States) Warner Center Marriott, Woodland Hills, California	Won WBC-USNBC and vacant USBA light welterweight titles
Win	15-3-2	(Mexico) Luis Alfredo Lugo	UD	8	2012-01-21	(United States) Warner Center Marriott, Woodland Hills, California	
Win	14-3-2	(United States) Fernando Rodriguez	RTD	5 (10), 0:10	2011-12-08	(United States) The Houston Club, Houston, Texas	Won vacant WBF Intercontinental welterweight title
Win	13-3-2	(United States) Rogelio De la Torre	SD	8	2011-08-20	(United States) Houston Athletic Fencing Center, Houston, Texas	Won vacant WBF United States welterweight title
Win	12-3-2	(United States) Larry Smith	MD	6	2011-07-30	(United States) Hotel Fredonia, Nacogdoches, Texas	
Loss	11-3-2	(United States) Terrance Cauthen	SD	8	2010-06-18	(United States) Cedar Gardens, Hamilton Township, New Jersey	
Win	11-2-2	(Puerto Rico) Hector Sanchez	TKO	5 (8), 2:29	2010-04-02	(United States) Hard Rock Hotel and Casino, Las Vegas, Nevada	
Loss	10-2-2	(United States) Mauricio Herrera	MD	8	2009-10-09	(United States) Doubletree Hotel, Ontario, California	
Win	10-1-2	(United States) Steve Quinonez	TKO	1 (8), 2:07	2009-03-27	(United States) Quiet Cannon, Montebello, California	
Win	9-1-2	(United States) Sergio Joel De La Torre	UD	6	2008-10-17	(United States) Quiet Cannon, Montebello, California	
Draw	8-1-2	(Mexico) Mario Alberto Altamirano Becerra	PTS	6	2008-02-22	(Mexico) Coliseo Olímpico, Guadalajara, Jalisco	
Win	8-1-1	(United States) John Lewis	UD	6	2007-10-11	(United States) Oceanview Pavilion, Port Hueneme, California	
Win	7-1-1	(Nicaragua) Anthony Martinez	KO	3 (8), 2:58	2007-06-22	(United States) Quiet Cannon, Montebello, California	
Win	6-1-1	(United States) Leonel Madrigal	PTS	6	2007-06-22	(United States) Florentine Gardens, El Monte, California	
Draw	5-1-1	(United States) David Rodela	MD	8	2006-09-15	(United States) Quiet Cannon, Montebello, California	For vacant USA California State welterweight title
Loss	5-1-0	(United States) Noel Rodriguez	KO	1 (6), 0:36	2006-07-14	(United States) Charro Ranch, San Antonio, Texas	
Win	5-0-0	(Mexico) Ricardo Galindo	UD	6	2006-04-20	(United States) Marriott Hotel, Irvine, California	
Win	4-0-0	(United States) Alfredo Rivera	UD	4	2006-02-17	(United States) Doubletree Hotel, Ontario, California	
Win	3-0-0	(United States) Juan Joaquin Perez	UD	4	2005-11-04	(United States) Quiet Cannon, Montebello, California	
Win	2-0-0	(Mexico) Alex Ramirez	TKO	2 (4), 2:33	2005-06-02	(United States) Henry Fonda Theater, Hollywood, California	
Win	1-0-0	(United States) Steve Parker	MD	4	2004-11-22	(United States) Doubletree Hotel, Ontario, California	
