= Tommy Martin (boxer) =

British former professional boxer (born 1994)

Personal information
- Nationality: British
- Born: 20 March 1994 (age 32) Chelmsford, Essex, England
- Height: 5 ft 8 in (173 cm)
- Weight: Light-welterweight

Boxing career
- Reach: 71 in (180 cm)
- Stance: Orthodox

Boxing record
- Total fights: 14
- Wins: 13
- Win by KO: 5
- Losses: 1

Thomas Martin (born 20 March 1994) is a British former professional boxer who competed from 2012 to 2016 and challenged once for the Commonwealth super-lightweight title in 2016.

== Career ==
Martin amassed a professional record of 10 wins and 0 losses before fighting for the English title against Ricky Boylan (12 wins and 1 loss).

The fight took place at the O2 Arena in London, on the under-card of Danny Mitchell vs. Daniel Estrada.

On 12 September 2015, on the undercard of Anthony Joshua vs. Gary Cornish, Martin beat Michael Devine for the WBA Continental super lightweight title. He won the fight by TKO.

Martin then challenged John Wayne Hibbert for two titles: Commonwealth (British Empire) super lightweight title and the WBC International super lightweight title.

Tommy Martin suffered his first defeat on 30 January 2016 at the hands of Hibbert, via KO.

As a result of his knock-out loss, Martin suffered a bleed on the brain which was found following a post-fight MRI scan. Martin announced his retirement on 24 October 2016, after less than 4 years as a professional.
