= Zac Dunn =

Australian boxer

Personal information
- Nickname: Dynamo
- Nationality: Australian
- Born: 4 February 1991 (age 35) Melbourne, Australia
- Weight: Super middleweight

Boxing career
- Stance: Orthodox

Boxing record
- Total fights: 30
- Wins: 29
- Win by KO: 24
- Losses: 1
- Draws: 0
- No contests: 0

Zac Dunn (born 4 February 1991) is an Australian professional boxer and the current WBC International Silver Super middleweight champion and former IBO World champion.

== Professional boxing record ==
28 fights	27 wins	1 loss
By knockout	22	1
By decision	5	0
By disqualification	0	0
Draws	0	
No contests	0	

Result	Record	Opponent	Type	Rd., Time	Date	Location	Notes
Win	27–1	(United States) Bo Gibbs Jr	TKO	6 (10)	17 November 2018	(Mexico) The Melbourne Pavilion, Flemington	Won vacant WBA Oceania super middleweight title
Win	26–1	(Belgium) Enrique Rubio	TKO	6 (10)	27 April 2018	(Australia) The Melbourne Pavilion, Flemington	
Win	25–1	(Belgium) Cedric Spera	TKO	4 (10)	9 Dec 2017	(Australia) The Melbourne Pavilion, Flemington	
Win	24–1	(Argentina) Luis Eduardo Paz	TKO	4 (10)	7 Oct 2017	(Mexico) Domo Unidad Deportiva del F.U.T.V., Merida	
Loss	23–1	(United Kingdom) David Brophy	TKO	7 (12)	17 Mar 2017	(Australia) The Melbourne Pavilion, Flemington, Victoria	Lost Commonwealth super middleweight title
Win	23–0	(United Kingdom) Liam Cameron	UD	12	25 Nov 2016	The Melbourne Pavilion, Flemington, Victoria, Australia	Won vacant Commonwealth super middleweight title
Win	22–0	(Argentina) Carlos Adan Jerez	RTD	5 (10), 3:00	1 Jul 2016	The Melbourne Pavilion, Flemington, Victoria, Australia	Retained WBC International Silver super middleweight title
Win	21–0	(Australia) Les Sherrington	TKO	3 (12), 1:52	30 Apr 2016	The Melbourne Pavilion, Flemington, Victoria, Australia	Retained WBC International Silver super middleweight title
Win	20–0	(Brazil) Rogerio Damasco	KO	1 (12), 1:16	26 Feb 2016	The Melbourne Pavilion, Flemington, Victoria, Australia	Won WBC International Silver super middleweight title
Win	19–0	(United States) Derrick Findley	SD	10	24 Oct 2015	Paramount Theatre, Huntington, New York, United States	
Win	18–0	(Ukraine) Max Bursak	UD	12	27 Jun 2015	Royal Exhibition Building, Carlton, Victoria, Australia	Won vacant IBO super middleweight title
Win	17–0	(Colombia) Beibi Berrocal	TKO	2 (12), 2:41	6 Mar 2015	Royal Exhibition Building, Carlton, Victoria, Australia	Retained WBO Oriental super middleweight title
Win	16–0	(Argentina) Ricardo Ramallo	TKO	7 (12), 1:51	12 Dec 2014	Royal Exhibition Building, Carlton, Victoria, Australia	Retained WBO Oriental super middleweight title
Win	15–0	(Hungary) Istvan Zeller	TKO	3 (12), 2:10	11 Oct 2014	Celebrity Room, Moonee Valley, Victoria, Australia	Won vacant WBO Oriental super middleweight title
Win	14–0	(Japan) Yutaka Oishi	TKO	4 (12)	25 July 2014	Shoppingtown Hotel, Doncaster, Victoria, Australia	
Win	13–0	(South Korea) Kyung-Suk Kwak	KO	2 (10), 2:10	16 May 2014	Shoppingtown Hotel, Doncaster, Victoria, Australia	
Win	12–0	(Argentina) Oscar Daniel Veliz	UD	10	21 February 2014	Shoppingtown Hotel, Doncaster, Victoria, Australia	
Win	11–0	(Philippines) Marlon Alta	TKO	5 (10)	29 November 2013	Shoppingtown Hotel, Doncaster, Victoria, Australia	
Win	10–0	(Chile) Mirko Manquecoy	TKO	2 (10)	21 September 2013	Croxton Park Hotel, Thornbury, Victoria, Australia	
Win	9–0	(New Zealand) Lee Oti	TKO	5 (12)	19 July 2013	Hungarian Community Centre, Wantirna, Victoria, Australia	
Win	8–0	(Argentina) Fernando Marcos Gonzalez	KO	2 (8)	10 May 2013	Hungarian Community Centre, Wantirna, Victoria, Australia	
Win	7–0	(Argentina) Mariano Jose Riva	UD	8	8 March 2013	Knox Netball Centre, Ferntree Gully, Victoria, Australia	
Win	6–0	(China) Yong Zhang	TKO	3 (8)	30 November 2012	Grand Star Receptions, Altona North, Victoria, Australia	
Win	5–0	(Iran) Amir Ranjdar	KO	1 (8)	26 October 2012	Grand Star Receptions, Altona North, Victoria, Australia	
Win	4–0	(Australia) Marlon Toby	TKO	2 (8)	31 August 2012	Reggio Calabria Club, Parkville, Victoria, Australia	
Win	3–0	(Argentina) Jonathan Taylor	TKO	4 (6)	21 July 2012	(New Zealand) Reggio Calabria Club, Parkville, Victoria, Australia	
Win	2–0	(Thailand) Dechapon Suwunnalird	TKO	5 (6)	16 June 2012	Community Youth Basketball Stadium, Lilydale, Victoria, Australia	
Win	1–0	(Australia) Marlon Toby	TKO	1 (6)	25 May 2012	Knox Netball Centre, Ferntree Gully, Victoria, Australia	

== Titles in boxing ==
Achievements
Regional titles
Vacant Title last held by (Australia) Evan Themelakis	Australia – Victoria State Super Middleweight Champion; 26 October 2012; Vacated	Vacant Title next held by (Australia) Ryan Breese
Vacant	WBC Asian Boxing Council Continental Super Middleweight Champion; 16 May 2014; Vacated	Vacant Title next held by (Australia) Ryan Breese
Vacant	WBC Eurasia Pacific Boxing Council Super Middleweight Champion; 25 July 2014; Vacated	Vacant Title next held by (Turkey) Alptug Oner
Vacant Title last held by (Kenya) Kariz Kariuki	WBO Oriental Super Middleweight Champion; 11 October 2014; Vacated	Vacant Title next held by (Australia) Blake Caparello
Vacant Title last held by (United Kingdom) Luke Blackledge	WBC International Silver Super Middleweight Champion; 26 February 2016 – present	Incumbent
World titles
Vacant Title last held by (France) Hugo Kasperski	WBC Youth World Super Middleweight Champion; 21 September 2013; Vacated	Vacant Title next held by (Turkey) Bugra Oner
Vacant Title last held by (United States) Donovan George	IBO World Super Middleweight Champion; 27 June 2015; Stripped	Vacant
Other titles
Vacant Title last held by (Australia) Ben McCulloch	Interim PABA Super Middleweight Champion; 19 July 2013; Vacated	Vacant Title next held by (Australia) Ben McCulloch
