= George Ashie =

Ghanaian boxer

Personal information
- Nickname: Red Tiger
- Nationality: Ghanaian
- Born: Accra, Ghana
- Weight: super feather/light/light welterweight

Boxing career
- Stance: Orthodox

Boxing record
- Total fights: 40
- Wins: 33 (KO 25)
- Losses: 6 (KO 1)
- Draws: 1

George "Red Tiger" Ashie born in Accra is a Ghanaian professional super feather/light/light welterweight boxer of the 2000s and 2010s who won the African Boxing Union super featherweight title, Universal Boxing Council (UBC) Super Featherweight title, and Commonwealth lightweight title, and was a challenger for the World Boxing Association (WBA) International lightweight title against Emmanuel Tagoe, and Commonwealth super featherweight title against Kevin Mitchell, his professional fighting weight varied from 128 1/2 lb (58.3 kg; 9 st 2.5 lb), i.e. super featherweight to 137 3/4 lb (62.5 kg; 9 st 11.8 lb), i.e. light welterweight.
