= Kamil Łaszczyk =

Polish boxer

Personal information
- Nationality: Polish
- Born: 20 January 1991 (age 35) Wrocław, Poland
- Height: 168 cm (5 ft 6 in)
- Weight: Featherweight; Super-featherweight

Boxing career
- Reach: 164 cm (65 in)
- Stance: Orthodox

Boxing record
- Total fights: 31
- Wins: 30
- Win by KO: 11
- Losses: 1

Kamil Łaszczyk (born 20 January 1991) is a Polish professional boxer.

Łaszczyk is the Republic of Poland International Featherweight champion.

== Professional boxing record ==
31 fights	30 wins	1 loss
By knockout	11	1
By decision	19	0

No.	Result	Record	Opponent	Type	Round, time	Date	Location	Notes
31	Loss	30–1	Yohan Vasquez	KO	2 (8), 1:15	31 May 2024	Melrose Ballroom, Queens, New York, U.S.	
30	Win	30–0	Kevin Acevedo	TKO	2 (10), 1:49	27 Aug 2022	Stadion Wrocław, Konin, Poland	
29	Win	29–0	Ismail Galiatano	UD	10	1 Mar 2022	Recreation and Sports Facility "Rondo", Konin, Poland	
28	Win	28–0	Piotr Gudel	TKO	5 (8), 2:59	20 Jun 2020	Hotel Arlamów, Arłamów, Poland	
27	Win	27–0	Oleksandr Yegorov	UD	8	23 Nov 2019	MOSIR Hall, Radom, Poland	
26	Win	26–0	Pavlo Tryputen	KO	3 (6), 2:59	28 Apr 2019	Sport Hall, Dzierżoniów, Poland	
25	Win	25–0	Ruslan Berchuk	UD	8	28 Apr 2019	Sport Hall, Starachowice, Poland	
24	Win	24–0	Andrei Nurchynski	UD	6	10 Oct 2017	Lodowisko BOSiR, Białystok, Poland	
23	Win	23–0	Piotr Gudel	UD	6	22 Oct 2016	Wieliczka Salt Mine, Wieliczka, Poland	
22	Win	22–0	Ignac Kassai	PTS	6	9 Apr 2016	Millennium Dome, London, England	
21	Win	21–0	Oscauris Frias	UD	8	14 Aug 2015	Prudential Center, Newark, New Jersey, US	
20	Win	20–0	Jose Luis Araiza	TKO	6 (8), 2:59	26 Mar 2015	Hialeah Park Race Track, Hialeah, Florida, U.S.	
19	Win	19–0	Antonio Horvatic	UD	6	12 Dec 2014	MOSiR Hall, Radom, Poland	
18	Win	18–0	Sergio Romero	UD	8	17 Oct 2014	Sport Hall, Dzierzoniów, Poland	
17	Win	17–0	Tuomo Eronen	UD	12	16 May 2014	Sport Hall, Ślesin, Poland	Won vacant WBF, Republic of Poland International featherweight title
16	Win	16–0	Daniel Diaz	UD	8	7 Feb 2014	UIC Pavilion, Chicago, Illinois, U.S.	
15	Win	15–0	Laszlo Fekete	TKO	3 (8), 2:04	22 Dec 2013	MOSiR Hall, Radom, Poland	
14	Win	14–0	Andrei Isaeu	UD	12	29 Jun 2013	Outside Theatre, Ostróda, Poland	Retained WBO Inter-Continental featherweight title
13	Win	13–0	Krzysztof Rogowski	UD	6	20 Apr 2013	Sport Hall, Rzeszów, Poland	
12	Win	12–0	Krzysztof Cieslak	UD	10	23 Feb 2013	Ergo Arena, Gdańsk, Poland	
11	Win	11–0	Antonio Cossu	UD	12	17 Nov 2012	Hotel Hilton, Warsaw, Poland	Won vacant WBO Inter-Continental featherweight title
10	Win	10–0	Gennadiy Delisandru	RTD	3 (10), 3:00	22 Sep 2012	Hala Stulecia, Wrocław, Poland	Won vacant WBC Baltic Silver featherweight title
9	Win	9–0	Nikita Lukin	UD	6	1 Jun 2012	Sport Hall, Rzeszów, Poland	
8	Win	8–0	Tevin Farmer	UD	8	24 Mar 2012	Resorts Hotel & Casino, Atlantic City, New Jersey, U.S.	Won vacant WBO Youth junior-lightweight title
7	Win	7–0	Samuel Sanchez	UD	6	28 Jan 2012	Fitzgerald's Casino & Hotel, Tunica, Mississippi, U.S.	
6	Win	6–0	Istvan Paszti	KO	1 (4), 1:10	3 Dec 2011	Hotel Hilton, Warsaw, Poland	
5	Win	5–0	Chris Montoya Jr	TKO	1 (4), 0:36	5 Nov 2011	Mohegan Sun Casino, Uncasville, Connecticut, U.S.	
4	Win	4–0	Terrance Roy	UD	4	1 Oct 2011	Fitzgerald's Casino & Hotel, Tunica, Mississippi, U.S.	
3	Win	3–0	Javier Ramos	TKO	1 (4), 1:48	1 Apr 2011	The Asylum, Philadelphia, Pennsylvania, U.S.	
2	Win	2–0	Luquan Lewis	KO	2 (4), 2:17	17 Mar 2011	Plattduetsche Restaurant, Franklin Square, New York, U.S.	
1	Win	1–0	Emil Brooks	KO	2 (4), 1:25	4 Mar 2011	Cordon Bleu, Woodhaven, New York, U.S.	

== Mixed martial arts record ==
Res.	Record	Opponent	Method	Event	Date	Round	Time	Location	Notes
Win	1-0	Amadeusz Roślik	TKO (punches)	Fame MMA 17: Ferrari vs. Łaszczyk	27 August 2022	3	2:52	Kraków, Poland	
