= Anthony Joshua vs. Dillian Whyte =

Boxing match

Bad Intentions
- Date: 12 December 2015
- Venue: The O2 Arena, London, England
- Title(s) on the line: Commonwealth, WBC International and vacant British heavyweight titles

Tale of the tape
Boxer	Anthony Joshua	Dillian Whyte
Nickname	AJ	The Body Snatcher
Hometown	London, England	London, England
Pre-fight record	14–0 (14 KOs)	16–0 (13 KOs)
Age	26 years, 1 month	27 years, 8 months
Height	6 ft 6 in (198 cm)	6 ft 4 in (193 cm)
Weight	245 lb (111 kg)	247 lb (112 kg)
Style	Orthodox	Orthodox
Recognition	WBO; No. 2 Ranked Heavyweight; WBC; No. 3 Ranked Heavyweight; IBF; No. 7 Ranked Heavyweight; WBA; No. 13 Ranked Heavyweight; The Ring/TBRB; No. 10 Ranked Heavyweight; Commonwealth and WBC International heavyweight champion	WBC; No. 18 Ranked Heavyweight; WBC International Silver heavyweight champion

Result
- Joshua defeated Whyte in the seventh-round by TKO

Anthony Joshua vs. Dillian Whyte, billed as Bad Intentions, was a professional boxing match contested between Commonwealth and WBC International heavyweight champion, Anthony Joshua, and WBC International Silver heavyweight champion, Dillian Whyte, with the vacant British heavyweight title also on the line. The bout took place on 12 December 2015 at The O2 Arena, with Joshua winning by technical knockout in the seventh round.

== Background ==
Joshua and Whyte first fought in 2009 as amateurs, with Whyte knocking Joshua down en route to a points decision victory. While Joshua stayed in the amateurs to win a gold medal at the 2012 Olympics, Whyte turned professional in 2011, going on to compile a record of 9–0 (6 KOs) before receiving a two-year ban after failing a drug test in 2012 for the banned substance methylhexaneamine. After the ban ended in 2014, Whyte expressed his desire for a rematch with Joshua, now 9–0 (9 KOs), while also claiming there was animosity between the two after Joshua made disparaging comments towards Whyte in an interview.

On 9 July 2015, the British Boxing Board of Control announced an agreement had been reached between the two to fight for the vacant British heavyweight title. Following Joshua's win over Gary Cornish in September, a first-round TKO to capture the vacant Commonwealth title, promoter Eddie Hearn revealed during the post-fight interview that the bout would take place on 12 December at The O2 Arena in London.

Joshua was ranked 2nd by the WBC, 3rd by the WBO, 7th by the IBF and 13th by the WBA, while Whyte was ranked 18th by the WBC.

== Fight details ==
The opener was an action-packed round which saw both fighters throwing power punches throughout, with the highlight being a left hook from Joshua that wobbled Whyte. Chaos erupted in the ring after Joshua threw a punch after the bell sounded to end the round, prompting Whyte to throw two punches over the shoulder of referee Howard Foster. Cornermen from both sides entered the ring to separate both fighters. At the start of the second round, Foster immediately called a timeout, bringing the fighters together and giving both a warning for their actions in the previous round before resuming the contest. Joshua began to goad Whyte, talking to him before throwing punches. With a little over one minute left of the round, Whyte landed a solid left hook that staggered Joshua. Whyte followed up with a barrage of punches but was unable to drop the champion. The third round saw both men work behind the jab, each landing stiff left hands. The bell sounding to start the fourth marked the first time Joshua had been past three rounds. He began to find his target with more frequency, leaving Whyte on unsteady legs on more than one occasion. The fifth and sixth rounds saw much of the same, both men having success with Joshua landing the more eye catching punches. The end came in the seventh, a round in which neither fighter had previously fought. Less than a minute into the round, Joshua landed a right hand to the head of Whyte, staggering the challenger and sending him reeling backwards into the ropes. After a sustained follow up attack by the champion, a right uppercut landed on the chin of Whyte, dropping the challenger and leaving him laid on his back and prompting Foster to forgo the ten count and wave off the contest.

== Aftermath ==
Speaking to BBC Radio 5 Live after the bout Joshua "A world title fight is still far away. Becoming an elite athlete in such a tough sport, it doesn't happen overnight but I've got the desire, ambition and the team around me to do it but I don't want to rush it because when I get there, I want to stay there."

=== Cancelled rematch ===
A rematch was set take place at London's O2 Arena on 12 August 2023. The rematch was cancelled due to Dillian Whyte's failed drug test.

== Fight card ==
Confirmed bouts:

Weight Class		vs.		Method	Round	Time	Notes
Heavyweight	Anthony Joshua (c)	def.	Dillian Whyte	TKO	7/12	1:27	^{Note 1}
Middleweight	Chris Eubank Jr.	def.	Gary O'Sullivan	RTD	7/12	3:00	^{Note 2}
Lightweight	Ismael Barroso	def.	Kevin Mitchell	TKO	5/12	2:47	^{Note 3}
Cruiserweight	Tony Bellew	def.	Mateusz Masternak	UD	12		^{Note 4}
Lightweight	Yvan Mendy	def.	Luke Campbell (c)	SD	12		^{Note 5}
Heavyweight	Derek Chisora	def.	Jakov Gospic	TKO	3/8	2:23
Welterweight	Paulie Malignaggi	def.	Antonio Moscatiello	UD	12		^{Note 6}
Cancelled preliminary bouts
Super Featherweight	Martin Joseph Ward	vs.	Elvis Guillen	N/a	6
Light Heavyweight	Jake Ball	vs.	Richard Horton	N/a	4
Welterweight	Ted Cheeseman	vs.	Ian Henry	N/a	4
Unfought floater bouts
Featherweight	Reece Bellotti	vs.	Samuel Escobar	N/a	4

^Note 1 For Commonwealth, WBC International and vacant British heavyweight titles
^Note 2 WBA middleweight title eliminator
^Note 3 For vacant WBA interim lightweight title
^Note 4 For vacant European cruiserweight title
^Note 5 For WBC International lightweight title
^Note 6 For vacant European Union welterweight title

== Broadcasting ==
Country	Broadcaster
United Kingdom	Sky Sports Box Office
Australia	Fox Sports
Ireland	Sky Sports
New Zealand	Sky Arena
Poland	TVP Sport

Preceded by vs. Gary Cornish	Anthony Joshua' bouts 12 December 2015	Succeeded by vs. Charles Martin
Preceded by vs. Brian Minto	Dillian Whyte's bouts 12 December 2015	Succeeded by vs. Ivica Bacurin
