= David Saucedo =

Argentine boxer

Personal information
- Nickname: El Vasco
- Born: Fernando David Saucedo; 13 January 1981 (age 45) Florencio Varela, Buenos Aires, Argentina
- Weight: Featherweight 56.9 kg

Boxing career
- Stance: orthodox

Boxing record
- Total fights: 75
- Wins: 63
- Win by KO: 10
- Losses: 9
- Draws: 3

Fernando David Saucedo (born 13 January 1981) commonly known as David Saucedo is an Argentine professional boxer. His father was also a boxer and is now his coach.

== Professional career ==
On 5 December 2010, Saucedo had his chance for WBA (Super) featherweight title against Chris John. But he was defeated by Unanimous Decision after 12 rounds.

On 4 October 2014, Saucedo was defeated by Unanimous Decision after 12 rounds against unbeaten Rances Barthelemy in his first defense of IBF super featherweight title.

On 27 January 2018, Ghana's Emmanuel Tagoe (28–1, 14 KOs) controversially stopped Fernando David Saucedo (61–7–3, 10 KOs) in round 10 to defend his IBO lightweight belt at the Bukom Boxing Arena in Accra, Ghana.

== Professional boxing record ==
65 Wins (10 knockouts), 10 Losses (4 knockouts), 3 Draw
Res.	Record	Opponent	Type	Round Time	Date	Location	Notes
Win	65–10–3	(Argentina) Sergio Gabriel Quintana	UD	4 (4)	2025-01-10	Club Germinal, Gerli, Argentina	
Loss	64–10–3	(Colombia) Ismael Barroso	KO	4 (8)	2022-08-20	(United States) Seminole Hard Rock Hotel & Casino, Hollywood, Florida, USA	
Win	64–9–3	(Argentina) Miguel Leonardo Caceres	UD	4 (4)	2019-12-07	(Argentina) Olimpia BBC, Venado Tuerto	
Loss	63–9–3	(Puerto Rico) Subriel Matias	TKO	1 (10	2018-10-27	(United States) Lakefront Arena, New Orleans, Louisiana, USA	
Win	63–8–3	(Paraguay) Victor Cardozo Coronel	UD	6 (6)	2018-05-11	Club Social y Deportivo Nahuel, Florencio Varela, Argentina	
Loss	62–8–3	(Mexico) Cristian Mijares	TKO	8 (10	2018-03-17	Grand Oasis Arena, Cancun, Mexico	
Loss	62–7–3	(Ghana) Emmanuel Tagoe	TKO	10 (10)	2018-01-27	Bukom Boxing Arena, Bukom, Accra, Ghana	For IBO lightweight title
Win	61–6–3	(Argentina) Ramon Elizer Esperanza	UD	6 (6)	2017-07-07	Centro Veteranos de Guerra Héroes de Malvinas, Florencio Varela, Argentina	
Win	60–6–3	(Argentina) Pablo Manuel Ojeda	UD	10 (10)	2016-09-10	Club Social y Deportivo Nahuel, Florencio Varela, Buenos Aires, Argentina	
Win	59–6–3	(Argentina) Diego Alberto Chaves	UD	10 (10)	2016-06-25	Club Social y Deportivo Nahuel, Florencio Varela, Buenos Aires, Argentina	
Win	58–6–3	(Argentina) Jorge Luis Rodriguez	UD	10 (10)	2015-12-26	Anfiteatro Municipal, La Falda, Cordoba, Argentina	
Win	57–6–3	(Dominican Republic) Carlos Fulgencio	TKO	2 (8)	2015-10-10	(United States) Lowell Memorial Auditorium, Lowell, Massachusetts, USA	
Win	56–6–3	(Brazil) Leandro Mendes Pinto	UD	10 (10)	2015-07-24	Polideportivo La Patriada, Florencio Varela, Buenos Aires, Argentina	Won interim WBC and WBO Latino super featherweight title
Win	55–6–3	(Argentina) Juan Jose Farias	TKO	8 (10)	2015-05-23	Club Unión Eléctrica, Cordoba, Cordoba, Argentina	
Win	54–6–3	(Brazil) Leandro Mendes Pinto	UD	10 (10)	2015-02-06	Club S. y Dep. Nahuel, Florencio Varela, Buenos Aires, Argentina	
Win	53–6–3	(Argentina) Sergio Mauricio Gil	UD	10 (10)	2014-12-12	Club S. y Dep. Nahuel, Florencio Varela, Buenos Aires, Argentina	
Loss	52–6–3	(Cuba) Rances Barthelemy	UD	12 (12)	2014-10-04	(United States) Foxwoods Resort, Mashantucket, Connecticut, USA	For IBF World super featherweight title
Win	52–5–3	(Argentina) Luis Armando Juarez	TKO	3 (10)	2014-06-27	Club Social y Deportivo Nahuel, Florencio Varela, Buenos Aires, Argentina	
Win	51–5–3	(Mexico) John Carlo Aparicio	UD	10 (10)	2013-12-13	Polideportivo La Patriada, Florencio Varela, Buenos Aires, Argentina	
Win	50–5–3	(Argentina) Sergio Manuel Medina	UD	12 (12)	2013-08-16	Club Social y Deportivo Nahuel, Florencio Varela, Buenos Aires, Argentina	Won vacant WBC Silver super featherweight title
Win	49–5–3	(Brazil) Isaias Santos Sampaio	KO	2 (10)	2013-06-21	Club Social y Deportivo Nahuel, Florencio Varela, Buenos Aires, Argentina	Retain interim WBC Latino super featherweight title
Win	48–5–3	(Brazil) Edilson Rio	TKO	7 (10)	2013-01-12	Club Social y Deportivo Nahuel, Florencio Varela, Buenos Aires, Argentina	
Win	47–5–3	(Chile) Cristian Palma	TKO	7 (10)	2012-11-03	Club La Unión, Colon, Entre Rios, Argentina	Won interim WBC Latino super featherweight title
Win	46–5–3	(Argentina) Luis Armando Juarez	UD	10 (10)	2012-04-13	Poldeportivo Municipal, Necochea, Buenos Aires, Argentina	Retain IBF Latino super featherweight title
Win	45–5–3	(Argentina) Sergio Alejandro Blanco	UD	4 (4)	2011-12-09	Club Ciclista Juninense, Junín, Buenos Aires, Argentina	
Win	44–5–3	(Argentina) Sergio Javier Escobar	UD	6 (6)	2011-09-30	General Lavalle, Buenos Aires, Argentina	
Win	43–5–3	(Argentina) Diego Ramon Acosta	TKO	2 (4)	2011-08-19	Florencio Varela, Buenos Aires, Argentina	
Win	42–5–3	(Argentina) Carlos Rodriguez	UD	12 (12)	2011-07-15	Club Social y Deportivo Nahuel, Florencio Varela, Buenos Aires, Argentina	Won vacant IBF Latino super featherweight title
Win	41–5–3	(Brazil) Cid Edson Bispo Ribeiro	KO	2 (10)	2011-04-15	Club Social y Deportivo Nahuel, Florencio Varela, Buenos Aires, Argentina	Won vacant WBC Mundo Hispano super featherweight title
Win	40–5–3	(Argentina) Sergio Daniel Ledesma	KO	1 (10)	2011-02-25	Sociedad de Fomento Monteverde, Florencio Varela, Buenos Aires, Argentina	
Win	39–5–3	(Argentina) Ricardo Chamorro	UD	4 (1)	2011-01-07	Sociedad de Fomento Monteverde, Florencio Varela, Buenos Aires, Argentina	
Loss	38–5–3	(Indonesia) Chris John	UD	12 (12)	2010-12-05	Indoor Tennis Stadium, Jakarta, Indonesia	For WBA (Super) featherweight title
Win	38–4–3	(Argentina) Jorge Martin Garcia	UD	4 (4)	2010-01-30	Club Atletico Racing, Trelew, Chubut, Argentina	
Win	37–4–3	(Argentina) Miguel Caceres	UD	6 (6)	2009-10-31	Estadio Municipal, Comodoro Rivadavia, Chubut, Argentina	
Win	36–4–3	(Argentina) Miguel Caceres	UD	4 (4)	2009-06-12	Sociedad de Fomento San Emilio, Florencio Varela, Buenos Aires, Argentina	
Win	35–4–3	(Argentina) Diego Ramon Acosta	UD	8 (8)	2008-12-19	Club Union y Progreso, Tandil, Buenos Aires, Argentina	
Win	34–4–3	(Argentina) Diego Ramon Acosta	UD	6 (6)	2008-10-10	Sociedad de Fomento 9 de Julio, Florencio Varela, Buenos Aires, Argentina	
Win	33–4–3	(Argentina) Leandro Almagro	UD	6 (6)	2008-06-21	Gimnasio municipal, Berisso, Buenos Aires, Argentina	
Win	32–4–3	(Argentina) Cristian Javier Olmedo	DQ	6 (6)	2008-04-11	Sociedad de Fomento 9 de Julio, Florencio Varela, Buenos Aires, Argentina	
Win	31–4–3	(Argentina) Sergio Daniel Ledesma	UD	6 (6)	2008-01-05	Polideportivo Municipal, Villa Gesell, Buenos Aires, Argentina	
Win	30–4–3	(Argentina) Claudio Rosendo Tapia	UD	12 (12)	2007-10-21	Sociedad de Fomento 9 de Julio, Florencio Varela, Buenos Aires, Argentina	Won vacant South American featherweight title
Win	29–4–3	(Argentina) Marcelo Antonio Gomez	UD	6 (6)	2007-09-01	Ce.De.M. N° 2, Caseros, Buenos Aires, Argentina	
Win	28–4–3	(Argentina) Claudio Rosendo Tapia	TD	6 (10)	2007-05-30	Ce.De.M. N° 2, Caseros, Buenos Aires, Argentina	
Win	27–4–3	(Argentina) Sergio Daniel Ledesma	UD	6 (6)	2007-05-01	Ce.De.M. N° 2, Caseros, Buenos Aires, Argentina	
Win	26–4–3	(Chile) Hardy Paredes	KO	2 (6)	2007-01-20	Polideportivo Municipal, Monte Hermoso, Buenos Aires, Argentina	
Win	25–4–3	(Argentina) Dante Fabian Tablada	UD	6 (6)	2006-10-27	Sociedad de Fomento 9 de Julio, Florencio Varela, Buenos Aires, Argentina	
Win	24–4–3	(Argentina) Alejandro Daniel Gomez	UD	6 (6)	2006-10-01	Sociedad de Fomento 9 de Julio, Florencio Varela, Buenos Aires, Argentina	
Win	23–4–3	(Argentina) Diego Martin Alzugaray	UD	10 (10)	2006-05-27	Ce.De.M. N° 2, Caseros, Buenos Aires, Argentina	Retain Argentina (FAB) lightweight title
Win	22–4–3	(Argentina) Sergio Gonzalez	DQ	10 (10)	2006-02-04	Estadio F.A.B., Buenos Aires, Distrito Federal, Argentina	Won Argentina (FAB) lightweight title
Draw	21–4–3	(Argentina) Alejandro Daniel Gomez	SD	6 (6)	2005-12-17	Club El Ciclon, Rosario, Santa Fe, Argentina	
Win	21–4–2	(Argentina) Ricardo Chamorro	UD	6 (6)	2006-02-04	Estadio F.A.B., Buenos Aires, Distrito Federal, Argentina	
Win	20–4–2	(Argentina) Hernan Valenzuela	UD	6 (6)	2005-07-30	Ce.De.M. N° 2, Caseros, Buenos Aires, Argentina	
Win	19–4–2	(Argentina) Julio Gonzalez	UD	6 (6)	2005-05-14	Ce.De.M. N° 2, Caseros, Buenos Aires, Argentina	
Win	18–4–2	(Argentina) Fabian Martinez	UD	8 (8)	2005-03-20	Ce.De.M. N° 2, Caseros, Buenos Aires, Argentina	
Win	17–4–2	(Argentina) Jesus Ceferino Vergara	UD	6 (6)	2005-02-27	Sociedad de Fomento 9 de Julio, Florencio Varela, Buenos Aires, Argentina	
Loss	16–4–2	(Brazil) Acelino Freitas	UD	10 (10)	2004-12-11	Ginasio Municipal, Ibirapuera, Sao Paulo, Brazil	
Win	16–3–2	(Argentina) Vicente Luis Burgo	UD	4 (4)	2004-11-05	Sociedad de Fomento 9 de Julio, Florencio Varela, Buenos Aires, Argentina	
Win	15–3–2	(Argentina) Miguel Angel Albarado	UD	10 (10)	2004-06-18	Quilmes Atletico Club, Quilmes, Buenos Aires, Argentina	
Loss	14–3–2	(Australia) Nedal Hussein	DQ	9 (12)	2004-05-21	Badgery's Pavilion, Homebush Bay, Sydney, New South Wales, Australia	
Win	14–2–2	(Argentina) Julio Cesar Alganaraz	UD	6 (6)	2004-03-20	Estadio F.A.B., Buenos Aires, Distrito Federal, Argentina	
Loss	13–2–2	(Argentina) Claudio Rosendo Tapia	UD	10 (10)	2004-01-27	Club Atletico Mar del Plata, Mar del Plata, Buenos Aires, Argentina	
Win	13–1–2	(Argentina) Ricardo Ariel Elias	MD	6 (6)	2004-01-10	Club Atletico Mar del Plata, Mar del Plata, Buenos Aires, Argentina	
Draw	12–1–2	(Argentina) Fabian Martinez	SD	4 (4)	2003-10-18	Estadio F.A.B., Buenos Aires, Distrito Federal, Argentina	
Win	12–1–1	(Argentina) Julio Gonzalez	UD	4 (4)	2003-09-17	Estadio F.A.B., Buenos Aires, Distrito Federal, Argentina	
Win	11–1–1	(Argentina) Fabian Martinez	UD	6 (6)	2003-06-28	Estadio F.A.B., Buenos Aires, Distrito Federal, Argentina	
