= John Wayne Hibbert =

English boxer (born 1984)

Personal information
- Nickname: John Wayne
- Born: Wayne Hibbert; 12 December 1984 (age 41) Orsett, Essex, England
- Height: 5 ft 10 in (178 cm)
- Weight: Light-welterweight; Welterweight

Boxing career
- Reach: 70 in (178 cm)
- Stance: Orthodox

Boxing record
- Total fights: 23
- Wins: 18
- Win by KO: 11
- Losses: 5

"John" Wayne Hibbert is an English former professional boxer who competed from 2009 to 2017. He held the WBC International light-welterweight title twice between 2014 and 2016, and the Commonwealth light-welterweight title from 2015 to 2016.

== Professional career ==
=== Early career ===
Hibbert made his professional debut on 21 June 2009, scoring a first-round technical knockout (TKO) victory over Damien Turner at the York Hall in London. He scored three more wins in 2009; a TKO over Andrew Patterson in September; Kevin McCauley by points decision (PTS) in October; and Bheki Moyo by TKO in December.

He secured another three wins in 2010; a stoppage win by corner retirement (RTD) against Rock Boulter in March; and PTS victories against Matt Scriven in April and William Warburton in December.

==== Prizefighter series ====
After compiling a record of 7–0 (4 KOs) he entered the 19th edition of the Prizefighter series on 7 June 2011 at the York Hall. He faced Kevin McIntyre in the quarter-final, losing by unanimous decision (UD) over three rounds to suffer his first professional defeat. All three judges scored the bout 29–28.

==== British and International Masters titles ====
In his next fight he faced Tommy Coward for the vacant British Masters welterweight title on 8 June 2012 at the Dome Leisure Centre in Doncaster. Hibbert captured the title by PTS over ten rounds, with referee Howard John Foster scoring the bout 95–94. He made a successful defence of the title against Leon Findlay in October, winning by PTS, followed by an eight-round PTS victory against Arek Malek in December before suffering his second professional defeat against Dave Ryan in an eliminator for the English light-welterweight title in March 2013, losing by PTS over ten rounds with referee Mark Green scoring the bout 97–95.

He bounced back from defeat with an eight-round TKO victory against Calum Cooper on 27 September 2013, capturing the vacant British Masters Gold light-welterweight title at the Civic Hall in Grays. After a TKO victory against Michal Vosyka in March 2014, Hibbert was scheduled to face Joe Hughes for the vacant Southern Area light-welterweight title on 19 July at the Civic Hall in Grays. However, after Hughes was forced to withdraw after falling ill with a virus, Hibbert instead fought Michael Dufek for the International Masters light-welterweight title. Hibbert defeated Dufek via fourth-round TKO to capture the title.

=== WBC International and Commonwealth titles ===
He next faced Leonardo Esteban Gonzalez for the vacant WBC International light-welterweight title on 11 October 2014 at The O2 Arena in London, live on Sky Sports. Hibbert captured his fourth professional title via fifth round TKO. He followed up with a successful defence of the title in January 2015, defeating Tyler Goodjohn via eighth-round TKO.

His next fight was a rematch with former conqueror Dave Ryan, the reigning Commonwealth light-welterweight champion, on 30 May at The O2 Arena. Hibbert knocked the champion to the canvas twice – once in the third round and again in the fifth – before suffering two knockdowns himself in the ninth round. He was able to rise to his feet after the second knockdown but came under immediate pressure from Ryan, prompting referee Victor Loughlin to step in and call a halt to the contest to hand Hibbert his third professional defeat, losing his title via ninth-round TKO.

The pair had an immediate rematch for a trilogy fight, returning to The O2 Arena on 12 September. Hibbert was knocked down in the sixth round and losing the fight with Ryan in control from the opening bell. Hibbert began to exert pressure from rounds seven through nine to find some success. In the tenth – after a right hook from Hibbert – Ryan pulled backwards with his hand on his back, visibly in pain. After a momentary pause, Hibbert attacked with a three punch combination to the champion's body, forcing Ryan to go down to the canvas on one knee, informing the referee his "back had gone". He managed to rise to his feet, only to be met by a flurry of punches from Hibbert to prompt referee Ian John Lewis to step in and call a halt to the contest, handing Hibbert the WBC International and Commonwealth titles via ninth-round TKO. He successfully defended the titles against Tommy Martin on 30 January 2016, scoring a knockout (KO) victory in the twelfth and final round at the Copper Box Arena in London.

=== WBC Silver title ===
He relinquished his titles in early 2016 in order to pursue a world title shot, facing Andrea Scarpa for the WBC's secondary world championship, the WBC Silver title, on 25 June 2016 at The O2 Arena. The bout was televised live on Sky Sports Box Office as part of the undercard for Anthony Joshua vs. Dominic Breazeale. In a fight which saw Hibbert suffer a severe cut in the third round, he was dropped in the fifth by a right hand from Scarpa. Hibbert was able to make it to his feet and finish the remainder of the round. However, at the end of the sixth, the bout was called off on the advice of the ring-side doctor, handing Hibbert a TKO loss.

=== IBF International title ===
In his next fight he was scheduled to face Tommy Coyle for the vacant IBF International light-welterweight title on 26 November 2016 at the Wembley Arena in London. After Coyle withdrew from the bout citing "personal reasons", Martin Gethin stepped in as a late replacement. Gethin, who last fought seven days prior, defeated Hibbert via fourth-round TKO. Following the defeat, Hibbert announced his retirement from boxing.

=== Comeback fight ===
Just seven months after retiring, Hibbert returned to the ring to score a six-round PTS victory against Arvydas Trizno on 22 July 2017 at the Brentwood Centre in Brentwood, Essex.

Hibbert was next scheduled to face Curtis Woodhouse in a Commonwealth light-welterweight eliminator on 24 February 2018 at the Dome Leisure Centre in Doncaster. However, after Scott Westgarth was rushed to hospital following his bout with Dec Spelman in an undercard fight, the event was cancelled. Weatgarth subsequently died from his injuries. The bout was later rescheduled to 16 June, but was cancelled once again after Hibbert withdrew due to injury.

== Bare-knuckle boxing ==
Hibbert once again retired from gloved boxing, turning over to the bare-knuckle side of the sport. He fought James Lilley to a draw over three rounds on 16 November 2019 at the indigo at The O2 in London.

== Professional boxing record ==
23 fights	18 wins	5 losses
By knockout	11	3
By decision	7	2

No.	Result	Record	Opponent	Type	Round, time	Date	Location	Notes
23	Win	18–5	Arvydas Trizno	PTS	6	22 Jul 2017	Brentwood Centre, Brentwood, England	
22	Loss	17–5	Martin Gethin	TKO	4 (10), 2:28	26 Nov 2016	Wembley Arena, London, England	For vacant IBF International light-welterweight title
21	Loss	17–4	Andrea Scarpa	TKO	6 (12), 2:55	25 Jun 2016	The O2 Arena, London, England	For WBC Silver light-welterweight title
20	Win	17–3	Tommy Martin	KO	12 (12), 1:38	30 Jan 2016	Copper Box Arena, London, England	Retained Commonwealth and WBC International light-welterweight titles
19	Win	16–3	Dave Ryan	TKO	10 (12), 1:43	12 Sep 2015	The O2 Arena, London, England	Won Commonwealth and WBC International light-welterweight titles
18	Loss	15–3	Dave Ryan	TKO	9 (12), 2:00	30 May 2015	The O2 Arena, London, England	Lost WBC International light-welterweight title; For Commonwealth light-welterweight title
17	Win	15–2	Tyler Goodjohn	TKO	8 (10), 0:53	31 Jan 2015	The O2 Arena, London, England	Retained WBC International light-welterweight title
16	Win	14–2	Leonardo Esteban Gonzalez	TKO	5 (10), 2:18	11 Oct 2014	The O2 Arena, London, England	Won vacant WBC International light-welterweight title
15	Win	13–2	Michal Dufek	TKO	4 (10), 2:17	19 July 2014	Civic Hall, Grays, England	Won vacant International Masters light-welterweight title
14	Win	12–2	Michal Vosyka	TKO	1 (4), 2:57	15 Mar 2014	Civic Hall, Grays, England	
13	Win	11–2	Calum Cooper	TKO	8 (12), 0:18	27 Sep 2013	Civic Hall, Grays, England	Won vacant British Masters Gold light-welterweight title
12	Loss	10–2	Dave Ryan	PTS	10	9 Mar 2013	Civic Hall, Grays, England	
11	Win	10–1	Arek Malek	PTS	8	6 Dec 2012	Civic Hall, Grays, England	
10	Win	9–1	Leon Findlay	PTS	10	12 Oct 2012	Civic Hall, Grays, England	Retained British Masters Silver welterweight title
9	Win	8–1	Tommy Coward	PTS	10	8 Jun 2012	Dome Leisure Centre, Doncaster, England	Won vacant British Masters Silver welterweight title
8	Loss	7–1	Kevin McIntyre	UD	3	7 Jun 2011	York Hall, London, England	Prizefighter: The Welterweights II – Quarter-finals
7	Win	7–0	William Warburton	PTS	6	4 Dec 2010	York Hall, London, England	
6	Win	6–0	Matt Scriven	PTS	6	24 Apr 2010	York Hall, London, England	
5	Win	5–0	Rick Boulter	RTD	2 (4), 3:00	21 Mar 2010	York Hall, London, England	
4	Win	4–0	Bheki Moyo	TKO	2 (4), 2:36	6 Dec 2009	York Hall, London, England	
3	Win	3–0	Kevin McCauley	PTS	4	9 Oct 2009	York Hall, London, England	
2	Win	2–0	Andrew Patterson	TKO	2 (4), 0:34	13 Sep 2009	York Hall, London, England	
1	Win	1–0	Damien Turner	KO	1 (4), 2:25	21 Jun 2009	York Hall, London, England	

Sporting positions
Regional boxing titles
Vacant Title last held by Chris Jenkins	WBC International light-welterweight champion 11 October 2014 – 30 May 2015	Succeeded by Dave Ryan
Preceded by Dave Ryan	WBC International light-welterweight champion 12 September 2015 – February 2016; Vacated	Vacant Title next held by Nicolas Gonzalez
Preceded by Dave Ryan	Commonwealth light-welterweight champion 12 September 2015 – February 2016; Vacated	Vacant Title next held by Josh Taylor
