= Kevin Mitchell (boxer) =

British boxer

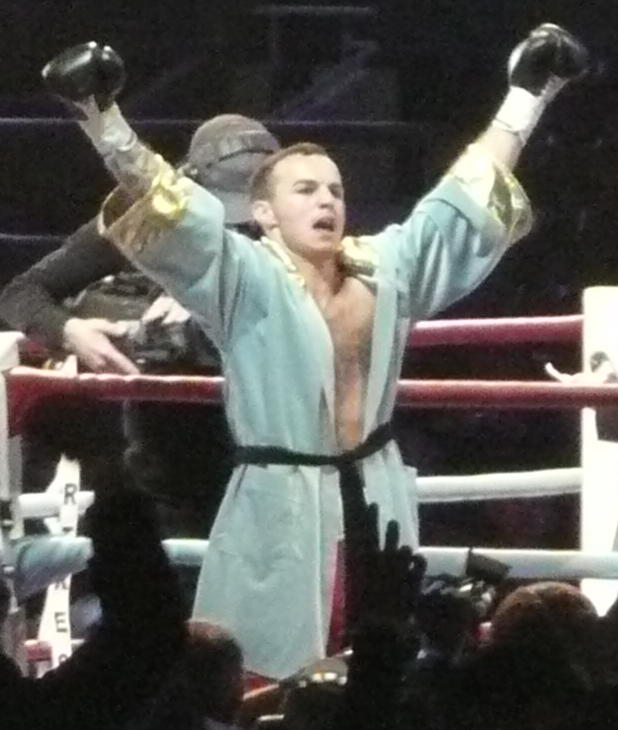
- Mitchell in 2010

Personal information
- Nicknames: The Hammer; The Dagenham Destroyer; Mighty
- Nationality: British
- Born: 29 October 1984 (age 41) Romford, London, England
- Height: 5 ft 8 in (173 cm)
- Weight: Super featherweight; Lightweight

Boxing career
- Reach: 68 in (173 cm)
- Stance: Orthodox

Boxing record
- Total fights: 43
- Wins: 39
- Win by KO: 29
- Losses: 4

Kevin Mitchell (born 29 October 1984) is a British former professional boxer who competed from 2003 to 2015. He challenged twice for the lightweight world title in 2012 and 2015. At the regional level, he held the Commonwealth super featherweight title from 2006 to 2008 and the British super featherweight title in 2008.

== Amateur career ==
As an amateur, Mitchell won the senior-level ABA featherweight title in 2003, at the age of 18.

== Professional career ==
Mitchell made his professional debut for promoter Frank Warren on 17 July 2003, scoring a first-round knockout of Stevie Quinn. On 10 December 2005, Mitchell stopped Mohammed Medjadji in six rounds to win the vacant IBF Inter-Continental super-featherweight title, his first regional championship.

=== Commonwealth and British super-featherweight champion ===
On 28 October 2006, Mitchell defeated George Ashie by a twelve-round unanimous decision to win the vacant Commonwealth super-featherweight title. Two defenses of this title came against Harry Ramogoadi on 10 March 2007 (sixth-round TKO) and Carl Johanneson on 8 March 2008 (ninth-round TKO). In the Johanneson fight, Mitchell also won the British super-featherweight title. Johanneson had drawn level on the judges' scorecards by the time of the stoppage.

=== Moving up to lightweight ===
In 2009, Mitchell began his campaign at lightweight. He won over Lanquaye Wilson on 22 May (third-round TKO) and Ruddy Encarnacion on 18 July (eighth-round TKO). One of Mitchell's most acclaimed matches to date was his win against Breidis Prescott on 5 December. Prescott was famous for his punching power and knockout of Amir Khan in 2008. At the end of the twelve-round, the judges scored the fight as a wide unanimous decision for Mitchell, handing him his 31st consecutive professional victory and the WBO Inter-Continental lightweight title.

=== First loss ===
On the 15 May 2010, Mitchell competed for WBO interim title, held by Michael Katsidis, as well as a chance to fight for a full world title later in the year. The referee stopped the fight two minutes into the third round when Katsidis hit Mitchell with a left hook and several unanswered punches.

=== Personal life ===
Mitchell was unable to compete for over a year due to personal issues. Prior to the Katsidis fight, Mitchell disclosed that he had been experiencing family and relationship difficulties, as well as engaging in an unhealthy lifestyle.

=== Comeback ===
A fight against fellow lightweight prospect and domestic rival John Murray, then undefeated as a professional, was set for 16 July 2011 as a comeback fight for Mitchell. Mitchell won his second WBO Inter-Continental lightweight title.

=== World title challenges ===
Another year of relative inactivity followed until 22 September 2012, when Mitchell faced WBO lightweight champion Ricky Burns for his first world title opportunity. In front of his home crowd in Glasgow, Burns scored two knockdowns and defeated Mitchell in four rounds. Following his second professional loss, Mitchell spent ten months away from the sport. From 2013 to 2014, having switched promoters to Matchroom Sport and reunited with former trainer Tony Sims, Mitchell earned four wins in what proved to be a steady return to form.

On 31 May 2014, an unexpected stiff test came in the form of Ghislain Maduma, on the undercard to the rematch between Carl Froch and George Groves at Wembley Stadium. On the day of the fight, Mitchell failed to make the IBF-mandated same-day weigh-in by 1 1/2 lb (0.68 kg), a mistake which Mitchell put down to having eaten steak the night before. Since the fight was an eliminator to face then-reigning IBF lightweight champion Miguel Vázquez, Mitchell had forfeited his chance at fighting for the title even if he won. In the fight against Maduma, Mitchell gave up an early lead on points and absorbed many clean punches from his highly aggressive opponent. In the ninth round, Mitchell began to gain ground by catching Maduma with clean punches of his own. This was followed up in rounds ten and eleven when Maduma was staggered by a series of punches and stopped on his feet.

On 31 January 2015, he faced Daniel Estrada for the vacant WBC Silver lightweight title. In what was described as a career-best performance, Mitchell showcased his boxing skills with renewed motivation en route to stopping Estrada in eight rounds. This set up a second world title opportunity for Mitchell, this time against WBC lightweight champion Jorge Linares. Their fight took place on 30 May. In round five, Mitchell scored a hard knockdown, allowing him to build up a lead on the scorecards. Linares scored a knockdown of his own in round ten, which quickly signaled the end of the fight as Mitchell's eye had been badly cut from a punch, forcing the referee to wave off the fight.

On 12 December, he made another attempt at vying for a world title on the undercard of Anthony Joshua vs. Dillian Whyte. On the line was the WBA interim lightweight title, and facing him was Ismael Barroso, who knocked him down three times. By the fifth round, the referee stopped the fight. Immediately afterwards, Mitchell had to be given oxygen by ringside doctors.

=== Retirement ===
Mitchell was scheduled to fight European lightweight champion Edis Tatli on 18 March 2016 in Finland, but on 10 February, Mitchell announced his retirement and withdrawal from the fight. He told Sky Sports, "I've had a good think about it over the last week and I'm happily retired now… I've been doing this 22 years and it's time to call it a day and start a new chapter in my life."

== Professional boxing record ==
43 fights	39 wins	4 losses
By knockout	29	4
By decision	10	0

No.	Result	Record	Opponent	Type	Round, time	Date	Location	Notes
43	Loss	39–4	Ismael Barroso	TKO	5 (12), 2:47	12 Dec 2015	The O2 Arena, London, England	For vacant WBA interim lightweight title
42	Loss	39–3	Jorge Linares	TKO	10 (12), 2:57	30 May 2015	The O2 Arena, London, England	For WBC lightweight title
41	Win	39–2	Daniel Estrada	TKO	8 (12), 1:12	31 Jan 2015	The O2 Arena, London, England	Won vacant WBC Silver lightweight title
40	Win	38–2	Ghislain Maduma	TKO	11 (12), 2:56	31 May 2014	Wembley Stadium, London, England	
39	Win	37–2	Mikheil Avakyan	TKO	2 (8), 2:07	15 Mar 2014	Echo Arena, Liverpool, England	
38	Win	36–2	Karim El Ouazghari	TKO	9 (12), 2:07	14 Dec 2013	ExCeL, London, England	Retained IBF Inter-Continental lightweight title
37	Win	35–2	Marco Antonio López	TKO	6 (12), 1:44	5 Oct 2013	The O2 Arena, London, England	Won vacant IBF Inter-Continental lightweight title
36	Win	34–2	Sebastien Benito	PTS	10	6 Jul 2013	York Hall, London, England	
35	Loss	33–2	Ricky Burns	TKO	4 (12), 2:59	22 Sep 2012	Exhibition and Conference Centre, Glasgow, Scotland	For WBO lightweight title
34	Win	33–1	Felix Lora	PTS	10	10 Feb 2012	York Hall, London, England	
33	Win	32–1	John Murray	TKO	8 (12), 1:46	16 Jul 2011	Echo Arena, Liverpool, England	Won vacant WBO Inter-Continental lightweight title
32	Loss	31–1	Michael Katsidis	TKO	3 (12), 1:57	15 May 2010	Boleyn Ground, London, England	For WBO interim lightweight title
31	Win	31–0	Ignacio Mendoza	KO	3 (12), 1:24	13 Feb 2010	Wembley Arena, London, England	Retained WBO Inter-Continental lightweight title
30	Win	30–0	Breidis Prescott	UD	12	5 Dec 2009	Metro Radio Arena, Newcastle, England	Won vacant WBO Inter-Continental lightweight title
29	Win	29–0	Ruddy Encarnacion	TKO	8 (10), 2:35	18 Jul 2009	MEN Arena, Manchester, England	
28	Win	28–0	Lanquaye Wilson	TKO	3 (8), 2:07	22 May 2009	York Hall, London, England	
27	Win	27–0	Walter Estrada	UD	12	7 Jun 2008	Boardwalk Hall, Atlantic City, New Jersey, US	Won vacant WBO Inter-Continental super featherweight title
26	Win	26–0	Carl Johanneson	TKO	9 (12), 2:29	8 Mar 2008	The O2 Arena, London, England	Won British super featherweight title; Retained Commonwealth super featherweight title
25	Win	25–0	Edison Torres	TKO	3 (10), 1:09	12 Jan 2008	York Hall, London, England	
24	Win	24–0	Alexander Khrulev	KO	2 (12), 0:57	14 Jul 2007	The O2 Arena, London, England	Won vacant WBO Inter-Continental super featherweight title; Retained IBF Inter-Continental super featherweight title
23	Win	23–0	Harry Ramogoadi	TKO	6 (12), 3:00	7 Jun 2007	Liverpool Olympia, Liverpool, England	Retained Commonwealth super featherweight title
22	Win	22–0	George Ashie	UD	12	28 Oct 2006	York Hall, London, England	Won vacant Commonwealth super featherweight title
21	Win	21–0	Andrei Isaeu	TKO	11 (12), 1:37	8 Sep 2006	Grosvenor House Hotel, London, England	Won IBF Inter-Continental super featherweight title
20	Win	20–0	Imad Ben Khalifa	TKO	2 (8), 0:34	7 Jul 2006	Millennium Stadium, Cardiff, Wales	
19	Win	19–0	Kirkor Kirkorov	RTD	2 (12)	13 May 2006	York Hall, London, England	Retained IBF Inter-Continental super featherweight title
18	Win	18–0	Youssouf Djibaba	UD	12	25 Feb 2006	ExCeL, London, England	Retained IBF Inter-Continental super featherweight title
17	Win	17–0	Mohammed Medjadji	TKO	6 (12), 2:12	10 Dec 2005	ExCel, London, England	Won vacant IBF Inter-Continental super featherweight title
16	Win	16–0	Daniel Thorpe	TKO	4 (8), 2:10	25 Oct 2005	Guild Hall, Preston, England	
15	Win	15–0	Wladimir Borov	TKO	2 (6), 1:35	23 Sep 2005	Hilton Hotel Mayfair, London, England	
14	Win	14–0	Karim Chakim	PTS	8	29 Apr 2005	Elephant and Castle Shopping Centre, London, England	
13	Win	13–0	Frederic Bonifai	PTS	6	8 Apr 2005	Meadowbank Stadium, Edinburgh, Scotland	
12	Win	12–0	Henry Janes	PTS	4	11 Dec 2004	ExCeL, London, England	
11	Win	11–0	Alain Rakow	KO	1 (6), 2:46	19 Nov 2004	York Hall, London, England	
10	Win	10–0	Mounir Guebbas	PTS	6	22 Oct 2004	Royal Highland Showground, Edinburgh, Scotland	
9	Win	9–0	Arpad J Toth	TKO	3 (6), 0:45	10 Sep 2004	York Hall, London, England	
8	Win	8–0	Jason Nesbitt	TKO	3 (4), 0:45	5 Jun 2004	York Hall, London, England	
7	Win	7–0	Slimane Kebaili	TKO	1 (4), 1:25	13 May 2004	York Hall, London, England	
6	Win	6–0	Eric Patrac	TKO	1 (4), 2:20	24 Apr 2004	Rivermead Leisure Centre, Reading, England	
5	Win	5–0	Kristian Laight	PTS	4	7 Feb 2004	York Hall, London, England	
4	Win	4–0	Jaz Virdee	TKO	1 (4), 1:13	24 Jan 2004	Wembley Conference Centre, London, England	
3	Win	3–0	Vladimir Varhegyi	TKO	3 (4), 1:44	6 Nov 2003	Goresbrook Leisure Centre, London, England	
2	Win	2–0	Csaba Ladanyi	TKO	1 (4), 2:21	18 Sep 2003	Goresbrook Leisure Centre, London, England	
1	Win	1–0	Stevie Quinn	KO	1 (4), 3:00	17 Jul 2003	Goresbrook Leisure Centre, London, England	

Sporting positions
Amateur boxing titles
Previous: David Mullholland	ABA featherweight champion 2003	Next: David Mullholland
Regional boxing titles
Vacant Title last held by Alex Arthur	IBF Inter-Continental super-featherweight champion 10 December 2005 – July 2006; Vacated	Vacant Title next held by Karim Chakim
Vacant Title last held by Karim Chakim	IBF Inter-Continental super-featherweight champion 8 September 2006 – October 2006; Vacated	Vacant Title next held by Emmanuel Tagoe
Vacant Title last held by Alex Arthur	Commonwealth super-featherweight champion 28 October 2006 – September 2008; Vacated	Vacant Title next held by Ricky Burns
Vacant Title last held by Román Martínez	WBO Inter-Continental super-featherweight champion 14 July 2007 – August 2007; Vacated	Vacant Title next held by Román Martínez
Preceded by Carl Johanneson	British super-featherweight champion 8 March 2008 – December 2009; Vacated	Vacant Title next held by Gary Sykes
Vacant Title last held by Amir Khan	WBO Inter-Continental lightweight champion 5 December 2009 – November 2010; Vacated	Vacant Title next held by Robert Guerrero
Vacant Title last held by Robert Guerrero	WBO Inter-Continental lightweight champion 16 July 2011 – June 2012; Vacated	Vacant Title next held by Carlos Molina
Vacant Title last held by Andrey Klimov	IBF Inter-Continental lightweight champion 5 October 2013 – May 2015; Vacated	Vacant Title next held by Richard Commey
Vacant Title last held by Javier Prieto	WBC Silver lightweight champion 31 January 2015 – 30 May 2015; Vacated	Vacant Title next held by Emiliano Marsili
