= Dierry Jean =

Haitian-born Canadian professional boxer

Personal information
- Nationality: (Canada) Canadian
- Born: April 20, 1982 (age 44) Haiti
- Height: 170 cm (5 ft 7 in)
- Weight: Light welterweight

Boxing career
- Stance: Orthodox

Boxing record
- Total fights: 34
- Wins: 31
- Win by KO: 22
- Losses: 2
- Draws: 1
- No contests: 0

Dierry Jean (born 20 April 1982 in Haiti) is a Haitian-born Canadian professional boxer fighting out of Montreal. He currently holds a professional record of 31–2–1.

== Professional career ==
Jean turned professional in 2006. He is currently managed by Montreal-based Eye of the Tiger Management.

Jean faced Lamont Peterson on January 25, 2014, in Washington, D.C., with Peterson's IBF Light Welterweight championship on the line. Peterson won the fight by unanimous decision, handing Jean his first career loss.

== Gambling and alcohol dependence ==
In November 2014, Dierry Jean decided to abandon the rings for an indefinite period to settle his addiction to gambling and alcohol. The group Eye of the Tiger Management (EOTTM) announced that the 32-year-old boxer had visited a rehabilitation center to treat a disease that was taking more and more space in the last month. On April 3, 2017, Jean was sentenced to 15 months in jail for robbery and drug possession, following events that incidentally happened in 2014.

== Professional boxing record ==
31 wins (22 knockouts), 2 losses, 1 draw, 0 no contests
Res.	Record	Opponent	Type	Round	Date	Location	Notes
Win	31-2-1	(Mexico) Jesus Nunez Rodriguez	TKO	1	2018-12-15	(Canada) Coca-Cola Coliseum, Toronto, Ontario	
Win	30-2-1	(Mexico) Abraham Gomez	TKO	6	2018-09-29	(Canada) Civic Complex, Cornwall, Ontario	
Draw	29-2-1	(Philippines) Ricky Sismundo	SD	8	2016-05-13	(Canada) Metropolis, Montréal, Québec	
Loss	29-2	(United States) Terence Crawford	TKO	10 (12)	2015-10-24	(United States) CenturyLink Center, Omaha, Nebraska	For WBO light welterweight title
Win	29-1	(United States) Jerry Belmontes	UD	10	2015-06-20	(Canada) Bell Centre, Montreal, Quebec	Retained WBC-NABF lightweight title
Win	28-1	(Dominican Republic) Carlos Manuel Reyes	KO	3 (10)	2015-03-14	(Canada) Bell Centre, Montreal, Quebec	
Win	27-1	(Mexico) Daniel Ruiz	TKO	5 (12)	2014-09-27	(Canada) Bell Centre, Montreal, Quebec	Retained WBC-NABF lightweight title
Win	26-1	(Mexico) Mario Perez	TKO	8 (12)	2014-06-13	(Canada) Pierre-Charbonneau Centre, Montréal, Québec	Won vacant WBC-NABF lightweight title
Loss	25-1	(United States) Lamont Peterson	UD	12	2014-01-25	(United States) DC Armory, Washington, District of Columbia	For IBF light welterweight title
Win	25-0	(United States) Cleotis Pendarvis	TKO	4 (12)	2013-05-10	(United States) Buffalo Run Casino, Miami, Oklahoma	
Win	24-0	(Mexico) Juan Jesus Rivera	TKO	2 (12)	2013-02-16	(Canada) Hilton Lac Leamy, Gatineau, Québec	Retained WBC-NABF light welterweight title
Win	23-0	(Mexico) Ivan Cano	TKO	11 (12)	2012-10-26	(Canada) Holiday Inn, Pointe-Claire, Québec	Retained WBC-NABF light welterweight title; Won vacant WBA-NABA light welterweight title
Win	22-0	(United States) Lanardo Tyner	UD	12	2012-05-19	(Canada) Holiday Inn, Pointe-Claire, Québec	Won vacant WBC-NABF light welterweight title
Win	21-0	(United Kingdom) Ryan Barrett	TKO	3 (8)	2012-02-18	(Canada) Bell Centre, Montréal, Québec	
Win	20-0	(Dominican Republic) Francisco Lorenzo	UD	10	2011-10-20	(Canada) Bell Centre, Montréal, Québec	
Win	19-0	(Puerto Rico) Wilfredo Negrón	TKO	5 (8)	2010-11-11	(Canada) Corona Theatre, Montréal, Québec	
Win	18-0	(Mexico) Antonio Soriano	RTD	6 (8)	2010-08-14	(Canada) Bell Centre, Montréal, Québec	
Win	17-0	(Mexico) Hugo Armenta	RTD	5 (8)	2009-11-07	(Canada) Montreal Casino, Montréal, Québec	
Win	16-0	(Mexico) Adrian Navarrete	UD	8	2009-06-06	(Canada) Montreal Casino, Montréal, Québec	
Win	15-0	(Mexico) Fabian Luque	TKO	2 (8)	2008-10-04	(Canada) Montreal Casino, Montréal, Québec	
Win	14-0	(Mexico) Cesar Soriano	UD	8	2008-08-01	(Canada) Gare Windsor, Montréal, Québec	
Win	13-0	(Mexico) Henry Arjona	KO	6 (8)	2008-05-03	(Canada) Montreal Casino, Montréal, Québec	
Win	12-0	(Mexico) Cristian Chavez	TKO	5 (8)	2008-03-08	(Canada) Montreal Casino, Montréal, Québec	
Win	11-0	(Trinidad and Tobago) Michael Springer	UD	8	2008-02-09	(Canada) Montreal Casino, Montréal, Québec	
Win	10-0	(The Bahamas) Anthony Woods	TKO	1 (6)	2008-01-11	(United States) Seminole Hard Rock Hotel and Casino, Hollywood, Florida	
Win	9-0	(Mexico) Saul Corral	KO	1 (4)	2007-12-01	(Canada) Montreal Casino, Montréal, Québec	
Win	8-0	(Mexico) Axel Rodrigo Solis	UD	4	2007-10-06	(Canada) Montreal Casino, Montréal, Québec	
Win	7-0	(Canada) Sebastien Hamel	KO	5 (6)	2007-09-21	(Canada) Colisée, Trois-Rivières, Québec	
Win	6-0	(Canada) Bakary Sako	TKO	4 (6)	2007-08-03	(Canada) Pierre-Charbonneau Centre, Montréal, Québec	
Win	5-0	(Mexico) Ivan Illescas	UD	4	2007-05-12	(Canada) Montreal Casino, Montréal, Québec	
Win	4-0	(Mexico) Mario Alberto Mondragon	KO	2 (4)	2007-03-19	(Canada) Montreal Casino, Montréal, Québec	
Win	3-0	(Mexico) Mario Rodriguez	TKO	2 (4)	2007-03-10	(Canada) Montreal Casino, Montréal, Québec	
Win	2-0	(Canada) Stephane Chartrand	TKO	4 (4)	2007-02-22	(Canada) Club Soda, Montréal, Québec	
Win	1-0	(Canada) Stephane Fleury	UD	4	2006-12-16	(Canada) Le Medley, Montréal, Québec	
