= Lucien Reid =

English boxer (born 1993)

Personal information
- Nickname: Lethal
- Born: 19 October 1993 (age 33) London, England
- Height: 5 ft 5 in (165 cm)
- Weight: Super-bantamweight

Boxing career
- Stance: Orthodox

Boxing record
- Total fights: 11
- Wins: 8
- Win by KO: 4
- Losses: 1
- Draws: 2

Lucien Reid (born 19 October 1993) is an English professional boxer who challenged for the British and Commonwealth super-bantamweight titles in 2019.

== Amateur career ==
Reid won the 2013 Amateur Boxing Association British bantamweight title, when boxing out of the West Ham ABC.

== Professional career ==
Reid made his professional debut on 30 May 2015, scoring a fourth-round technical knockout (TKO) victory over Elemir Rafael at The O2 Arena, London.

After compiling a record of 8–0 (4 KOs), he faced Ingi Sangha in March 2019. Following an accidental clash of heads, Reid suffered a cut above his right eye. Reid's corner was unable to stem the flow of blood which ultimately promoted referee Kieran McCann to call the fight off in the third round, resulting in a technical draw (TD).

In his next fight he challenged British, and Commonwealth super-bantamweight champion Brad Foster on 14 September at the York Hall in London, resulting in a majority draw (MD). Two judges scored the bout even at 114–114, while the third scored it 116–112 to Reid.

A rematch with Foster was held on 22 February 2020, again at the York Hall, with only the British title on the line, serving as domestic build-up for Deontay Wilder vs. Tyson Fury II later that night. Reid retired at the end of the sixth round.

== Professional boxing record ==
10 fights	8 wins	0 losses
By knockout	4	0
By decision	4	0
Draws	2	

No.	Result	Record	Opponent	Type	Round, time	Date	Location	Notes
11	Loss	8–1–2	Brad Foster	RTD	6 (12), 3:00	22 Feb 2020	York Hall, London, England	For British super-bantamweight title
10	Draw	8–0–2	Brad Foster	MD	12	14 Sep 2019	York Hall, London, England	For British, and Commonwealth super-bantamweight titles
9	Draw	8–0–1	Indi Sangha	TD	2 (6), 1:20	8 Mar 2019	Royal Albert Hall, London, England	Fight stopped after Reid cut from head clash
8	Win	8–0	Rafael Castillo	PTS	8	20 Oct 2018	Brentwood Centre, Brentwood, England	
7	Win	7–0	Jose Aguilar	PTS	6	16 Sep 2016	Copper Box Arena, London, England	
6	Win	6–0	Michael Mooney	PTS	6	20 May 2017	Copper Box Arena, London, England	
5	Win	5–0	Trayan Slavev	TKO	2 (4), 2:46	10 Jun 2016	York Hall, London, England	
4	Win	4–0	Gabor Kovacs	TKO	1 (6), 1:59	30 Jan 2016	Copper Box Arena, London, England	
3	Win	3–0	David Leo	RTD	3 (4), 3:00	3 Dec 2015	Civic Hall, Grays, England	
2	Win	2–0	Samuel Escobar	PTS	4	12 Sep 2015	The O2 Arena, London, England	
1	Win	1–0	Elemir Rafael	TKO	4 (4), 2:46	30 May 2015	The O2 Arena, London, England	
