= Ohara Davies =

English boxer (born 1992)

Personal information
- Nickname: Two Tanks
- Nationality: British
- Born: 9 February 1992 (age 34) Hackney, London, England
- Height: 5 ft 7 in (170 cm)
- Weight: Lightweight; Light-welterweight

Boxing career
- Reach: 71 in (180 cm)
- Stance: Orthodox

Boxing record
- Total fights: 30
- Wins: 26
- Win by KO: 18
- Losses: 4

Ohara Davies (born 9 February 1992) is a British professional boxer. He has challenged once for the WBA interim light-welterweight title in 2024. At regional level, he has held multiple light-welterweight championships; and challenged for the Commonwealth title in 2017.

== Professional career ==
=== Early career ===
Davies turned professional in 2014 and won on points in a four-round contest on his debut against Latvian fighter Ivans Levickis (9–12) on 19 April at the York Hall in London.

By the end of 2014, Davies held a record of 4–0 after knockout wins over Kristian Dochev (10–16), Andy Harris (3–18–1) and Oszkar Fiko (10–7). The latter two victories came on Matchroom Boxing shows.

Davies won all five of his contests in 2015, ending the year with a record of 9–0. He defeated Lee Gibbons (3–2), Jacek Wylezol (11–7), Simas Volosinas (6–30), Dame Seck (9–9–2) and Chris Truman (13–4–2), with Wylezol the only one to last the distance.

After defeating Ghana's Prince Ofotsu (15–5) in January, in March, Matchroom Boxing announced that Davies would fight for the vacant English lightweight against Andy Keates (11–3) The fight would take place on the undercard to Charles Martin vs. Anthony Joshua at The O2 Arena in London on 9 April.

Davies won by fourth-round knockout after knocking Keates down in the round one before knocking him out in round four.

Davies won both of his next two contests against Zoltan Szabo (9–0) and Chaquib Fadli (13–7), winning both inside the distance in non-title fights.

=== Rise up the ranks ===
==== Davis vs. Scarpa ====
In October, Matchroom Boxing announced that Davies would fight WBC Silver light-weltweight champion Andrea Scarpa (20–2) at Wembley Arena. Davies won by unanimous decision with all three judges producing scorecards of 120–108.

==== Davis vs. Matthews ====
On 9 January Matchroom Boxing confirmed that Davies would defend his WBC Silver light-welterweight title against former lightweight world title challenger Derry Matthews (38–11–2) on the undercard to David Haye vs Tony Bellew at the O2 Arena on London on 4 March.

Davies won by third-round stoppage after twice knocking down Mathews down in the third round. Shortly after the fight, Mathews retired from boxing.

==== Davis vs. Taylor ====
On 19 May Cyclone Promotions announced that Davies would defend his WBC Silver title against undefeated Commonwealth champion Josh Taylor (9–0), with both titles at stake. The fight would take place at the Braehead Arena in Glasgow on 8 July.

Davies was dominated in the fight. He was knocked down in round three and then twice in round seven before the referee halted the contest, his first defeat as a professional.

=== Return to the ring ===
==== Davis vs. Farrell ====
On 24 July Matchroom Boxing announced that Davies would fight undefeated Liverpool prospect Tom Farrell (13–0) for the vacant WBA International light-welterweight title on the undercard to Paul Butler vs Stuart Hall II at the Echo Arena in Liverpool on 30 September.

Davies won by sixth-round stoppage after knocking down Farrell once in round one, twice in round two and twice in round six.

On 27 April promoter Frank Warren confirmed that Davies would fight for the first time under his promotional banner against France's Christopher Sebire (26–10–1) on the undercard to Lee Selby vs Josh Warrington at the Elland Road Stadium in Leeds on 19 May. Davies went on to win via UD against Ismail Abdoul after Sebire pulled out. In the post fight interview Davies called out Jack Catterall and Terry Flanagan.

==== Davies vs. Vasquez ====
On 28 June 2019, Davies fought Miguel Vasquez. Davies won the fight with the sole referee scoring it 97–94. Even Davies himself thought the score was too wide and even raised Vasquez's hand after the score was announced.

=== The Golden Contract ===
==== Davies vs. McKenna ====
On 30 September 2020, Davies fought Tyrone McKenna. Davies won the fight via a narrow split-decision, 96–94, 96–94 and 95–95.

=== Retirement ===
==== Davies vs. Azim ====
Davies was stopped in the eighth round by Adam Azim at the Copper Box Arena in London, England on 19 October 2024.

== Professional boxing record ==
30 fights	26 wins	4 losses
By knockout	18	3
By decision	8	1

No.	Result	Record	Opponent	Type	Round, time	Date	Location	Notes
30	Win	26–4	Mohamed Aliseni	UD	8	13 Jun 2025	Bukom Boxing Arena, Accra, Ghana	
29	Loss	25–4	Adam Azim	KO	8 (12), 1:18	19 Oct 2024	Copper Box Arena, London, England	
28	Loss	25–3	Ismael Barroso	TKO	1 (12), 1:53	6 Jan 2024	Virgin Hotels Las Vegas, Paradise, Nevada, US	For WBA interim light-welterweight title
27	Win	25–2	Lewis Ritson	KO	9 (12), 2:23	4 Mar 2023	Newcastle Arena, Newcastle, England	
26	Win	24–2	Abdessamad Nechchad	TKO	8 (10), 0:37	18 Jun 2022	Leeds United FC Centenary Pavilion, Leeds, England	
25	Win	23–2	Nicholas Mwangi	UD	10	26 Nov 2021	Motospace Dubai Investment Park, Dubai, UAE	
24	Win	22–2	Tyrone McKenna	MD	10	30 Sep 2020	York Hall, London, England	Won WBC International light-welterweight title; The Golden Contract: Light-welterweight – Final
23	Win	21–2	Jeff Ofori	TKO	6 (10), 1:06	21 Feb 2020	York Hall, London, England	The Golden Contract: Light-welterweight – Semi-final
22	Win	20–2	Logan Yoon	RTD	7 (10), 3:00	22 Nov 2019	York Hall, London, England	The Golden Contract: Light-welterweight – Quarter-final
21	Win	19–2	Miguel Vázquez	PTS	10	28 Jun 2019	York Hall, London, England	
20	Loss	18–2	Jack Catterall	UD	12	6 Oct 2018	Leicester Arena, Leicester, England	For WBO Inter-Continental light-welterweight title
19	Win	18–1	Paul Kamanga	KO	2 (10), 2:41	23 Jun 2018	The O2 Arena, London, England	Won WBC International light-welterweight title
18	Win	17–1	Ahmed Ibrahim	PTS	6	19 May 2018	Elland Road, Leeds, England	
17	Win	16–1	Tom Farrell	TKO	6 (10), 0:50	30 Sep 2017	Echo Arena, Liverpool, England	Won WBA International light-welterweight title
16	Loss	15–1	Josh Taylor	TKO	7 (12), 2:25	8 Jul 2017	Braehead Arena, Glasgow, Scotland	Lost WBC Silver light-welterweight title; For Commonwealth light-welterweight title
15	Win	15–0	Derry Mathews	TKO	3 (12), 2:55	4 Mar 2017	The O2 Arena, London, England	Retained WBC Silver light-welterweight title
14	Win	14–0	Andrea Scarpa	UD	12	26 Nov 2016	Wembley Arena, London, England	Won WBC Silver light-welterweight title
13	Win	13–0	Chaquib Fadli	KO	2 (6), 2:44	1 Oct 2016	Jahnsportforum, Germany	
12	Win	12–0	Zoltan Szabo	RTD	5 (8), 3:00	21 Jun 2016	York Hall, London, England	
11	Win	11–0	Andy Keates	KO	4 (10), 0:31	9 Apr 2016	The O2 Arena, London, England	Won English lightweight title
10	Win	10–0	Prince Ofotsu	TKO	3 (6), 0:42	30 Jan 2016	Copper Box Arena, Olympic Park, London, England	
9	Win	9–0	Chris Truman	RTD	2 (8), 3:00	7 Nov 2015	Echo Arena, Liverpool, England	
8	Win	8–0	Dame Seck	TKO	3 (6), 2:41	12 Sep 2015	The O2 Arena, London, England	
7	Win	7–0	Simas Volosinas	TKO	2 (6), 2:34	28 May 2015	York Hall, London, England	
6	Win	6–0	Jacek Wylezol	UD	6	21 Mar 2015	Rostock, Germany	
5	Win	5–0	Lee Gibbons	KO	1 (6), 1:19	31 Jan 2015	The O2 Arena, London, England	
4	Win	4–0	Oszkar Fiko	TKO	1 (6), 2:39	6 Dec 2014	York Hall, London, England	
3	Win	3–0	Andy Harris	KO	2 (4), 0:37	11 Oct 2014	The O2 Arena, London, England	
2	Win	2–0	Kristian Dochev	TKO	1 (4), 2:50	7 Jun 2014	York Hall, London, England	
1	Win	1–0	Ivans Levickis	PTS	4	19 Apr 2014	York Hall, London, England	
