= Gary Cornish =

Scottish boxer (born 1987)

Personal information
- Nickname: Highlander
- Nationality: Scottish
- Born: 10 April 1987 (age 39) Inverness, Scotland
- Height: 6 ft 7 in (201 cm)
- Weight: Heavyweight

Boxing career
- Reach: 84 in (213 cm)
- Stance: Orthodox

Boxing record
- Total fights: 27
- Wins: 25
- Win by KO: 13
- Losses: 2

Gary Cornish (born 10 April 1987) is a Scottish former professional boxer who competed from 2011 to 2018. At regional level, he challenged once for the Commonwealth heavyweight title in 2015 and once for the British heavyweight title in 2017.

== Amateur career ==
As a youngster, he played football for Brora Rangers. He decided to go to the local boxing gym only to improve his fitness for football. He fell in love with boxing, quickly discovering his talent for the sport. Trainers and seasoned fighters were not used to 6 ft 7in boxers who possessed such speed and athleticism, and as such it proved difficult to find suitable opponents. After a pursuit of football, he eventually returned to boxing, the sport where he had shown most ability, at age of 19. His amateur career was short, due to the difficulty in finding suitable opponents, and he turned professional with an amateur record of 9–0.

== Professional career ==
His break out fight came in 2015, when he challenged Hungarian Zoltan Csala for the vacant IBO Inter-Continental Heavyweight title. Cornish dominated Csala and won the fight via a technical knockout in the fourth round.

=== Cornish vs. Joshua ===
On 12 September 2015, Cornish fought Anthony Joshua for the Vacant Commonwealth Belt. Cornish was stopped by the referee just 90 seconds into the fight. He was the first Scottish heavyweight to fight for the commonwealth heavyweight title.

Cornish remained largely absent from the public eye following the Joshua fight, but since regrouped in 2016 with two points victories in bouts fought in Scotland.

In 2017, he became the first Scottish boxer to fight for the British heavyweight title against Sam Sexton. His bid for the title proved unsuccessful, as he lost by unanimous decision to Sexton.

In March 2019, Cornish announced that he would be retiring from boxing on medical grounds after a brain scan. He described his decision to retire as "devastating".

== Personal life ==
Cornish is proud of his Scottish heritage. He has a tattoo on his chest, saying "Alba gu bràth," which is a Scottish Gaelic phrase used to express allegiance to Scotland as it means 'Scotland forever'. He’s married to Briony, who’s also from Scotland, Inverness, where they currently reside.

== Professional boxing record ==
27 fights	25 wins	2 losses
By knockout	13	1
By decision	12	1

No.	Result	Record	Opponent	Type	Round, time	Date	Location	Notes
27	Win	25–2	David Howe	TKO	1 (6), 1:29	26 Jan 2018	Crowne Plaza Hotel, Glasgow, Scotland	
26	Loss	24–2	Sam Sexton	UD	12	6 Oct 2017	Meadowbank Arena, Edinburgh, Scotland	For vacant British heavyweight title
25	Win	24–1	Kamil Sokolowski	PTS	6	18 Feb 2017	Lagoon Leisure Centre, Paisley, Scotland	
24	Win	23–1	Tomas Mrazek	PTS	6	24 Jun 2016	Radisson Hotel, Glasgow, Scotland	
23	Win	22–1	Kamil Sokolowski	PTS	8	25 Mar 2016	Beach Ballroom, Aberdeen, Scotland	
22	Loss	21–1	Anthony Joshua	TKO	1 (12), 1:37	12 Sep 2015	The O2 Arena, London, England	For WBC International, and vacant Commonwealth heavyweight titles
21	Win	21–0	Zoltan Csala	TKO	4 (12), 0:47	23 May 2015	Bellahouston Leisure Centre, Glasgow, Scotland	Won vacant IBO Inter-Continental heavyweight title
20	Win	20–0	Marino Goles	TKO	1 (10), 0:59	28 Feb 2015	Lagoon Leisure Centre, Paisley, Scotland	
19	Win	19–0	Larry Olubamiwo	PTS	8	9 Jun 2014	Lagoon Leisure Centre, Paisley, Scotland	
18	Win	18–0	Hrvoje Kisicek	TKO	2 (6)	28 Apr 2014	Radisson Hotel, Glasgow, Scotland	
17	Win	17–0	Ivica Perkovic	TKO	3 (6), 2:50	30 Nov 2013	Copper Box Arena, London, England	
16	Win	16–0	Tomas Mrazek	TKO	7 (8), 2:47	20 Sep 2013	Hilton Hotel, London, England	
15	Win	15–0	Paul Butlin	KO	5 (10), 3:08	7 Jun 2013	The Ironworks, Inverness, Scotland	Won vacant International Masters heavyweight title
14	Win	14–0	Humberto Evora	RTD	4 (8), 3:00	15 Mar 2013	York Hall, London, England	
13	Win	13–0	Jakov Gospic	TKO	4 (8), 2:03	15 Feb 2013	Rainton Meadows Arena, Houghton-le-Spring, England	
12	Win	12–0	Tamas Bajzath	PTS	6	21 Jan 2013	Radisson Hotel, Glasgow, Scotland	
11	Win	11–0	Yavor Marinchev	TKO	5 (6), 0:52	7 Dec 2012	Drumossie Hotel, Inverness, Scotland	
10	Win	10–0	Moses Matovu	PTS	6	22 Oct 2012	Radisson Hotel, Glasgow, Scotland	
9	Win	9–0	Peter Erdos	PTS	6	28 Sep 2012	The Ironworks, Inverness, Scotland	
8	Win	8–0	Tayar Mehmed	PTS	4	2 Jun 2012	Bowlers Exhibition Centre, Manchester, England	
7	Win	7–0	Laszlo Peczeli	TKO	2 (6), 0:15	11 May 2012	Drumossie Hotel, Inverness, Scotland	
6	Win	6–0	Igoris Borucha	PTS	4	25 Feb 2012	Beach Ballroom, Aberdeen, Scotland	
5	Win	5–0	Remigijus Ziausys	PTS	4	21 Jan 2012	Olympia, Liverpool, England	
4	Win	4–0	Hastings Rasani	PTS	8	2 Dec 2011	Drumossie Hotel, Inverness, Scotland	
3	Win	3–0	Rolandas Cesna	PTS	4	23 Sep 2011	Beach Ballroom, Aberdeen, Scotland	
2	Win	2–0	Hastings Rasani	RTD	4 (6), 2:00	11 Jun 2011	Beach Ballroom, Aberdeen, Scotland	
1	Win	1–0	Howard Daley	TKO	2 (6), 0:43	4 Aug 2011	Radisson Hotel, Glasgow, Scotland	
