= David Brophy (boxer) =

Scottish boxer

Personal information
- Nickname: Brophs
- Nationality: Scottish
- Born: 9 June 1990 (age 36) Caldercruix, Scotland
- Height: 5 ft 11 in (180 cm)
- Weight: Middleweight; Super-middleweight; Light-heavyweight

Boxing career
- Reach: 71 in (180 cm)
- Stance: Orthodox

Boxing record
- Total fights: 25
- Wins: 22
- Win by KO: 4
- Losses: 2
- Draws: 1

David Brophy (born 9 June 1990) is a Scottish professional boxer who held the Commonwealth super-middleweight title in 2017.

== Career ==
Brophy made his professional debut in February 2011 defeating James Tucker on points in Wishaw, Scotland.

On 17 March 2017 Brophy beat Zac Dunn by TKO in the seventh round and won the Commonwealth (British Empire) super middleweight title.

On 27 November 2019 Brophy announced his retirement from professional boxing, following advice from doctors regarding a prevalent eye issue.

== Record ==
25 fights	22 wins	2 losses
By knockout	4	2
By decision	18	0
Draws	1	

No.	Result	Record	Opponent	Type	Round, time	Date	Location	Notes
25	Win	22–2–1	(Slovakia) Vladimir Belujsky	PTS	6	22 Mar 2019	(United Kingdom) Emirates Arena, Glasgow, Scotland	
24	Win	21–2–1	(Ghana) Charles Adamu	PTS	6	30 Nov 2018	(United Kingdom) Emirates Arena, Glasgow, Scotland	
23	Win	20–2–1	(Hungary) Norbert Szekeres	TKO	5 (6)	24 Aug 2018	(United Kingdom) Emirates Arena, Glasgow, Scotland	
22	Loss	19–2–1	(United Kingdom) Rocky Fielding	TKO	1 (12)	30 Sep 2017	(United Kingdom) Echo Arena, Liverpool, England	Lost Commonwealth super-middleweight title; For British super-middleweight title
21	Win	19–1–1	(Australia) Zac Dunn	TKO	7 (12), 2:00	17 Mar 2017	The Melbourne Pavilion, Melbourne, Australia	Won Commonwealth super-middleweight title
20	Win	18–1–1	(Lithuania) Kiril Psonko	PTS	6	20 Jan 2017	(United Kingdom) Crowne Plaza Hotel, Glasgow, Scotland	
19	Win	17-1-1	(United Kingdom) Kelvin Young	TKO	2 (8), 2:05	1 Oct 2016	(United Kingdom) Bellahouston Leisure Centre, Glasgow, Scotland	
18	Loss	16-1-1	(United Kingdom) George Groves	KO	4 (12), 0:47	9 Apr 2016	(United Kingdom) O2 Arena, London, England	For vacant WBA International super-middleweight title
17	Win	16-0-1	(Lithuania) Vaidas Balciauskas	PTS	6	27 Feb 2016	(United Kingdom) Bellahouston Leisure Centre, Glasgow, Scotland	
16	Win	15-0-1	(United Kingdom) Tobias Webb	PTS	10	5 Dec 2015	(United Kingdom) Meadowbank Sports Centre, Edinburgh, Scotland	
15	Win	14-0-1	(United Kingdom) Dan Blackwell	PTS	6	5 Sep 2015	(United Kingdom) Meadowbank Sports Centre, Edinburgh, Scotland	
14	Win	13-0-1	(United Kingdom) Darren McKenna	PTS	8	12 Jun 2015	(United Kingdom) Bellahouston Leisure Centre, Glasgow, Scotland	
13	Win	12-0-1	(Romania) Vitalie Mirza	TKO	1 (6), 1:37	4 Oct 2014	(United Kingdom) First Direct Arena, Leeds, England	
12	Win	11-0-1	(United Kingdom) Harry Matthews	PTS	6	27 Jun 2014	(United Kingdom) Braehead Arena, Glasgow, Scotland	
11	Win	10-0-1	(United Kingdom) Jamie Ambler	PTS	8	1 Mar 2014	(United Kingdom) Scottish Exhibition Centre, Glasgow, Scotland	
10	Win	9-0-1	(United Kingdom) Alistair Warren	PTS	6	7 Dec 2013	(United Kingdom) Gorbals Leisure Centre, Glasgow, Scotland	
9	Win	8-0-1	(United Kingdom) Jason Ball	PTS	4	7 Sep 2013	(United Kingdom) Scottish Exhibition Centre, Glasgow, Scotland	
8	Win	7-0-1	(United Kingdom) Gary Boulden	PTS	6	11 May 2013	(United Kingdom) Emirates Arena, Glasgow, Scotland	
7	Win	6-0-1	(United Kingdom) James Tucker	PTS	4	16 Feb 2013	(United Kingdom) Gorbals Leisure Centre, Glasgow, Scotland	
6	Win	5-0-1	(United Kingdom) Tommy Tolan	PTS	4	21 Sep 2012	(United Kingdom) Marriott Hotel, Glasgow, Scotland	
5	Draw	4-0-1	(United Kingdom) Lee Noble	PTS	4	6 Apr 2012	(United Kingdom) Dalziel Park Hotel, Motherwell, Scotland	
4	Win	4-0	(United Kingdom) Danny Brown	PTS	4	25 Nov 2011	(United Kingdom) Ravenscraig Sports Centre, Motherwell, Scotland	
3	Win	3–0	(United Kingdom) Ryan Clark	PTS	4	11 Nov 2011	(United Kingdom) Gorbals Leisure Centre, Glasgow, Scotland	
2	Win	2–0	(United Kingdom) Matt Scriven	PTS	6	13 May 2011	(United Kingdom) Bellahouston Leisure Centre, Glasgow, Scotland	
1	Win	1–0	(United Kingdom) James Tucker	PTS	4	25 Feb 2011	(United Kingdom) Sports Centre, Wishaw, Scotland	
