= Ismael Barroso =

Venezuelan boxer

Personal information
- Born: Ismael Jose Barroso Bernay; 27 January 1983 (age 43) El Tigre, Anzoátegui, Venezuela
- Height: 5 ft 8 1/2 in (174 cm)
- Weight: Lightweight; Light welterweight

Boxing career
- Reach: 69 in (175 cm)
- Stance: Southpaw

Boxing record
- Total fights: 33
- Wins: 26
- Win by KO: 23
- Losses: 5
- Draws: 2

Ismael Jose Barroso Bernay (born 27 January 1983) is a Venezuelan professional boxer. He held the World Boxing Association (WBA) (Interim version) super lightweight title between January and September 2024, having previously held the same title at lightweight from 2015 to 2016. He challenged for the WBA lightweight title in the 2016 and the WBA super lightweight title in 2023.

== Professional career ==
Barroso made his professional debut on 13 August 2005 against Carlos Cardenas. Their fight ended in a four-round points draw. In his next fight, which took place nearly three years later on 31 March 2008, Barroso scored a first-round stoppage over Rafael May; his first of many knockout wins. Barroso's first outing on a major stage came on 12 December 2015 on the undercard of Anthony Joshua vs. Dillian Whyte against Kevin Mitchell for the vacant WBA interim lightweight title. From the opening round, Mitchell was unable to fend off Barroso's highly aggressive southpaw style, who scored three knockdowns. By the fifth round, the referee spared Mitchell from further damage and stopped the fight. Immediately afterwards, Mitchell had to be given oxygen by ringside doctors.

On 7 May 2016, Barroso endured a reversal of fortune when he faced Anthony Crolla for the WBA lightweight title, having travelled to England for a second time. Despite getting off to a similar start as he did against Mitchell, landing many hard punches and backing Crolla up, Barroso's onslaught began to wane in round five. In the seventh, Crolla scored a knockdown after a series of body shots, Barroso was unable to make the referee's count, handing him his first defeat.

== Professional boxing record ==
| 33 fights | 26 wins | 5 losses |
|---|---|---|
| By knockout | 23 | 4 |
| By decision | 3 | 1 |
| Draws | 2 | |

| No. | Result | Record | Opponent | Type | Round, time | Date | Location | Notes |
|---|---|---|---|---|---|---|---|---|
| 33 | Win | 26–5–2 | Pascual Salgado | UD | 8 | 29 Aug 2026 | Carlos Utria Gymnasium, Soplaviento, Colombia | |
| 32 | Loss | 25–5–2 | Andy Hiraoka | TKO | 9 (12), 2:58 | 3 Sep 2024 | Ariake Arena, Tokyo, Japan | |
| 31 | Win | 25–4–2 | Ohara Davies | TKO | 1 (12), 1:53 | 6 Jan 2024 | Virgin Hotels Las Vegas, Paradise, Nevada, U.S. | Won interim WBA super lightweight title |
| 30 | Loss | 24–4–2 | Rolando Romero | TKO | 9 (12) 2:41 | 13 May 2023 | The Cosmopolitan, Paradise, Nevada, U.S. | For vacant WBA super lightweight title |
| 29 | Win | 24–3–2 | Fernando David Saucedo | KO | 4 (8), 2:11 | 20 Aug 2022 | Seminole Hard Rock Hotel and Casino, Hollywood, California, U.S. | |
| 28 | Win | 23–3–2 | Nestor Hugo Paniagua | KO | 1 (10), 1:43 | 30 Jan 2021 | Four Ambassadors Hotel, Miami, Florida, U.S. | |
| 27 | Win | 22–3–2 | Yves Ulysse Jr. | UD | 12 | 5 Dec 2019 | The Hangar, Costa Mesa, California, U.S. | Won WBA Gold super lightweight title |
| 26 | Win | 21–3–2 | Enrique Martin Escobar | KO | 2 (8), 2:54 | 22 Mar 2019 | Miccosukee Resort & Gaming, Miami, Florida, U.S. | |
| 25 | Loss | 20–3–2 | Batyr Akhmedov | KO | 9 (12), 1:06 | 18 Aug 2018 | Westin Bonaventure Hotel, Los Angeles, California, U.S. | For WBA Inter-Continental super lightweight title |
| 24 | Loss | 20–2–2 | Isa Chaniev | UD | 12 | 12 May 2018 | Arena Riga, Riga, Latvia | For IBF Inter-Continental and WBO International lightweight titles |
| 23 | Win | 20–1–2 | Fidel Maldonado | TKO | 6 (10) | 13 Oct 2017 | Fantasy Springs Resort Casino, Indio, California, U.S. | |
| 22 | Loss | 19–1–2 | Anthony Crolla | KO | 7 (12), 1:30 | 7 May 2016 | Manchester Arena, Manchester, England | For WBA lightweight title |
| 21 | Win | 19–0–2 | Kevin Mitchell | TKO | 5 (12), 2:47 | 12 Dec 2015 | The O2 Arena, London, England | Won vacant WBA interim lightweight title |
| 20 | Win | 18–0–2 | Ira Terry | KO | 1 (8), 2:49 | 17 Apr 2015 | Grand Casino, Hinckley, Minnesota, U.S. | |
| 19 | Win | 17–0–2 | Issouf Kinda | TKO | 6 (10), 0:03 | 13 Mar 2015 | The Space, Westbury, New York, U.S. | Won vacant NABA and NABO interim lightweight titles |
| 18 | Win | 16–0–2 | Maximiliano Galindo | KO | 3 (8), 2:02 | 5 Dec 2014 | El Cobertiso, Concordia, Mexico | |
| 17 | Win | 15–0–2 | Luis Ernesto Jose | TKO | 2 (10), 2:45 | 18 Dec 2013 | Club Maquiteria, Santo Domingo, Dominican Republic | |
| 16 | Win | 14–0–2 | Winston Campos | KO | 4 (11) | 26 Oct 2013 | Sports City Gym, San José, Costa Rica | Retained WBA Fedelatin interim lightweight title |
| 15 | Win | 13–0–2 | Oscar Arenas | KO | 1 (11), 1:13 | 27 Oct 2012 | Parque Naciones Unidas, Caracas, Venezuela | Won vacant WBA Fedelatin interim lightweight title |
| 14 | Win | 12–0–2 | Edinson Garcia | TKO | 3 (8) | 21 Jul 2012 | Roberto Durán Arena, Panama City, Panama | |
| 13 | Win | 11–0–2 | Jose Miguel Payares | KO | 2 (9) | 28 Apr 2012 | Coliseo El Limón, Maracay, Venezuela | Retained WBA Fedebol lightweight title |
| 12 | Win | 10–0–2 | Julio Camano | TKO | 5 (9), 1:05 | 30 Mar 2012 | Roberto Durán Arena, Panama City, Panama | Retained WBA Fedebol lightweight title |
| 11 | Win | 9–0–2 | Abraham Gomez | UD | 8 | 10 Dec 2011 | El Palenque de la Feria, Tepic, Mexico | |
| 10 | Win | 8–0–2 | Wilson Silva | TKO | 1 (8), 0:36 | 3 Nov 2011 | Pepper Disco Club, San José, Costa Rica | |
| 9 | Win | 7–0–2 | Addir Sanchez | KO | 5 (9), 0:45 | 2 Jun 2011 | Hotel Veneto, Panama City, Panama | Won vacant WBA Fedebol lightweight title |
| 8 | Win | 6–0–2 | Rosano Lawrence | KO | 1 (8), 0:28 | 15 Apr 2011 | Palacio Dorado, Panama City, Panama | |
| 7 | Win | 5–0–2 | Javier Mercado | KO | 1 (4), 0:49 | 3 Mar 2011 | Pharaoh's Casino, Managua, Nicaragua | |
| 6 | Draw | 4–0–2 | Wilson Silva | SD | 4 | 10 Dec 2010 | Fight Club Escazu, San José, Costa Rica | |
| 5 | Win | 4–0–1 | Alfonso Perez | TKO | 5 (6) | 7 Nov 2009 | Domo José María Vargas, Maiquetía, Venezuela | |
| 4 | Win | 3–0–1 | Enrique Rivera | TKO | 1 (6) | 19 Dec 2008 | El Velódromo Teo Capriles, Caracas, Venezuela | |
| 3 | Win | 2–0–1 | Kerrys Moreno | KO | 1 (4) | 30 Aug 2008 | Maracaibo, Venezuela | |
| 2 | Win | 1–0–1 | Rafael May | TKO | 1 (4) | 31 Mar 2008 | Gimnasio Mocho Navas, Petare, Venezuela | |
| 1 | Draw | 0–0–1 | Carlos Cardenas | PTS | 4 | 13 Aug 2005 | Circulo Militar, Maracay, Venezuela | |

== See also ==
- List of southpaw stance boxers

Sporting positions
Regional boxing titles
| Vacant Title last held by Ammeth Diaz | WBA Fedebol lightweight champion 2 June 2011 – October 2012; Vacated | Vacant Title next held by Wilfrido Buelvas |
| New title | WBA Gold super lightweight champion 5 December 2019 – January 2021; Vacated | Vacant |
World boxing titles
| Vacant Title last held by Derry Mathews | WBA lightweight champion Interim title 12 December 2015 – 7 May 2016; Failed to win full title | Vacant Title next held by Rolando Romero |
