= Iván Cano (boxer) =

Mexican boxer (born 1987)

Personal information
- Nickname: Macanón
- Born: Iván Cano García; 1987 (age 38–39) Tlalnepantla, Mexico
- Height: 1.70 m (5 ft 7 in)
- Weight: Lightweight

Boxing career

Boxing record
- Total fights: 37
- Wins: 25
- Win by KO: 15
- Losses: 10
- Draws: 2

Iván Cano García (born 1987) is a Mexican professional boxer who challenged for the WBC lightweight title in 2015.

== Professional career ==
Cano lost to Dierry Jean for the North American Boxing Federation and North American Boxing Association super lightweight titles, and to Jorge Linares for the World Boxing Council lightweight title.

Cano fought Javier Prieto twice in 2014 with both fights resulting in a draw.
