= Javier Prieto (boxer) =

Mexican boxer (born 1987)

Personal information
- Nickname: Implacable
- Born: Francisco Javier Prieto Álvarez; July 5, 1987 (age 39) Apatzingán, Michoacán, Mexico
- Height: 5 ft 8 in (173 cm)
- Weight: Lightweight; Light welterweight; Welterweight

Boxing career
- Reach: 69 in (175 cm)
- Stance: Orthodox

Boxing record
- Total fights: 41
- Wins: 28
- Win by KO: 20
- Losses: 11
- Draws: 2

Francisco Javier Prieto Alvarez (born 5 July 1987) is a Mexican professional boxer who challenged for the WBC lightweight title in 2014 and held the WBC Silver lightweight title from 2013 to 2014.

== Professional career ==
Prieto made his professional debut as a boxer at the age of eighteen, defeating his opponent by way of technical knockout on March 16, 2006.

Prieto has twice fought to a draw against Ivan Cano.

== Professional boxing record ==
41 fights	28 wins	11 losses
By knockout	20	5
By decision	7	6
By disqualification	1	0
Draws	2	

Result	Record	Opponent	Type	Round, time	Date	Location	Notes
Loss	27–10–2	(Mexico) Ivan Alvarez	UD	8	Oct 29, 2016	Palenque de Gomez Palacio, Gómez Palacio, Mexico	
Loss	27–9–2	(Mexico) Carlos Molina	SD	8	Jun 18, 2016	Deportivo Agustín Ramos Millan, Toluca, Mexico	
Win	27–8–2	(Mexico) Rodrigo Mejia	KO	6 (10), 0:36	Feb 27, 2016	Gimnasio Olímpico Juan de la Barrera, Mexico City, Mexico	
Win	26–8–2	(Mexico) David Rangel	TKO	2 (10)	Nov 7, 2015	Centro de Convenciones, Tomatlán, Mexico	
Win	25–8–2	(Mexico) Jorge Silva	UD	10	Mar 28, 2015	Domo Deportivo, Tulum, Mexico	
Loss	24–8–2	(Venezuela) Jorge Linares	KO	4 (12), 1:50	Dec 30, 2014	Metropolitan Gymnasium, Tokyo, Japan	For vacant WBC lightweight title
Draw	24–7–2	(Mexico) Ivan Cano	MD	12	Sep 27, 2014	Hotel Gran Riviera Princess, Playa del Carmen, Mexico	Retained WBC Silver lightweight title
