= John Murray (boxer) =

English boxer (born 1984)

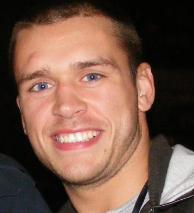
- Murray in 2009

Personal information
- Nationality: British
- Born: 20 December 1984 (age 41) Manchester, England
- Height: 5 ft 8 in (173 cm)
- Weight: Lightweight

Boxing career
- Reach: 70 in (178 cm)
- Stance: Orthodox

Boxing record
- Total fights: 36
- Wins: 33
- Win by KO: 20
- Losses: 3

John Murray (born 20 December 1984) is a British former professional boxer who competed from 2003 to 2014. He held the English lightweight title from 2007 to 2008, the British lightweight title twice between 2008 and 2010, and the European lightweight title from 2010 to 2011. He also challenged once for the vacant WBA lightweight title in 2011. John is the brother of British former Olympian Joe Murray. Since retiring, Murray has opened his own gym in Reddish, where he trains both amateur and professional boxers.

== Professional career ==
Murray's first professional fight took place in September 2003 with a 4-round points win over journeyman Peter Buckley. Over the next two years Murray was busy in the ring scoring 15 more wins in 15 fights before in December 2005 defeating Ignacio Mendoza for the WBC World Youth lightweight title. He made one defence of his title against Moebi Sarouna and scored decent wins over Ben Odamattey and Lorenzo Bethea before defeating Dean Hickman at the Ice Arena in Nottingham for the English title. In October 2006 he was awarded the prestigious young boxer of the year award at a ceremony held in London, an award previously held by the likes of Ricky Hatton, Frank Bruno and Barry McGuigan.

=== British Champion ===
Following the Hickman victory, Murray fought twice more against journeyman opponents before meeting Salford boxer Lee Meager for the vacant British lightweight title in July 2008. He won the belt after the referee stopped the fight in the 5th round. Following the fight Meager, a promotional stablemate, announced his retirement. The first defence of his title was made on 17 January 2009 at the Robin Park Centre in Wigan. Murray managed to keep hold of the belt after scoring an 8th round stoppage over Aberdeen's Lee McAllister.

Murray's second defence of the title on 13 June 2009 against Stoke fighter Scott Lawton ended before it had even begun when Murray weighed in for the contest 2oz overweight. Despite efforts to get down to the lightweight limit, Murray was unable to shift the weight and was stripped of the belt. The contest with Lawton still went ahead and resulted in a sixth round stoppage for Murray ensuring that he was still undefeated but no longer a champion. As punishment for failing to make the weight in a championship contest Murray, his trainer Joe Gallagher and his manager Mike Marsden were each fined £1500 by the British Boxing Board of Control.

Murray reclaimed the belt on 3 October 2009 after scoring a fourth round stoppage against former British and European champion Jonathon Thaxton at the Altrincham Leisure Centre. He had his fourth official British title fight on 7 May 2010 against Welsh boxer Gary Buckland this time in Widnes. The fight was also for the vacant European title and resulted in an 11th round stoppage win for Murray who was also able to keep his Lonsdale Belt for good. Murray having won the belt outright chose to vacate in order to defend his European crown with Gavin Rees winning the vacant title against John Watson on 6 November 2010.

=== European Champion ===
Murray made the first defence of the European title on 25 September 2010 against the Ukrainian boxer Andriy Kudryavtsev at the Robin Park Arena in Wigan. Kudryavstev had previously fought for the title in 2009 losing to Anthony Mezaache in 12 rounds and had held a number of titles including the Ukrainian national title and the European External Union title. Murray wore down his opponent to score a 9th round stoppage after a high tempo contest. Speaking after the fight Murray said that he knew the fight would be tough after watching Kudryavstev on tape and said that now he wanted to fight the top guys in the lightweight division saying he'd love a "world title shot before Christmas". Murray's next fight however was to be on 2 April 2011, traveling to London's York Hall to defend against Spanish champion Karim El Ouazghari. Both fighters were warned and deducted a point during the fight which Murray eventually won on points over the 12 round distance. The fight against El Ouazghari was Murray's first since joining up with promoter Frank Warren and was described by some as a "scrappy" performance. Murray summed up by saying "It wasn't my best fight, it was like having my debut again. I have cleaned up at domestic and European level and I am looking at moving on". Warren himself said that he'd like to see a fight between Murray and Kevin Mitchell in the future saying "the fans would like to see, but the bottom line is that John is the champion and it's all about what he wants to do."

=== Kevin Mitchell fight ===
Murray vacated the European belt in order to fight Kevin Mitchell who was not eligible to challenge for the title due to suffering a loss in his preceding fight with Michael Katsidis. Murray's trainer Joe Gallagher said that John should have been fighting for a world title but as the fight wasn't mandated then beating Mitchell would be a sure way of getting noticed. Mitchell himself had said that the fight represented a "last chance saloon" for him as the fight with Katsidis had resulted in a third round stoppage. Mitchell had cited "personal problems" as having marred his preparation for that fight. The two met at the Echo Arena in Liverpool on 16 July 2011 with Murray suffering a first career defeat via stoppage in the 8th round. Mitchell had hurt Murray in the 7th round and finally scored a knockdown in the 8th before the referee stepped in to call a halt to the fight in what was described as a "superb" contest.

=== World title shot ===
On 7 October 2011 it was confirmed that despite a first career defeat in his previous fight Murray would take on Brandon Rios for the WBA Lightweight title on 3 December in New York City. Murray lost the fight by TKO in 11th round. However, Ríos was overweight and was subsequently stripped of his title and had to pay Team Murray $20000 from his purse. The vacant WBA Lightweight title was only able to be won by Murray.

== Professional boxing record ==
36 fights	33 wins	3 losses
By knockout	20	3
By decision	13	0

No.	Result	Record	Opponent	Type	Round, time	Date	Location	Notes
36	Loss	33–3	(United Kingdom) Anthony Crolla	TKO	10 (12), 2:20	19 Apr 2014	(United Kingdom) Manchester Arena, Manchester, England	For WBO Inter-Continental lightweight title
35	Win	33–2	(United Kingdom) John Simpson	TKO	2 (10), 2:58	1 Mar 2014	(United Kingdom) Exhibition and Conference Centre, Glasgow, Scotland	
34	Win	32–2	(Argentina) Michael Escobar	TKO	4 (6), 1:43	22 Nov 2013	(United Kingdom) Bowlers Exhibition Centre, Manchester, England	
33	Loss	31–2	(United States) Brandon Ríos	TKO	11 (12), 2:06	3 Dec 2011	(United States) Madison Square Garden, New York City, New York, US	For vacant WBA lightweight title
32	Loss	31–1	(United Kingdom) Kevin Mitchell	TKO	8 (12), 1:46	16 Jul 2011	(United Kingdom) Echo Arena, Liverpool, England	For vacant WBO Inter-Continental lightweight title
31	Win	31–0	(Spain) Karim El Ouazghari	UD	12	2 Apr 2011	(United Kingdom) York Hall, London, England	Retained European lightweight title
30	Win	30–0	(Ukraine) Andriy Kudryavtsev	TKO	9 (12), 2:39	25 Sep 2010	(United Kingdom) Robin Park Arena, Wigan, England	Retained European lightweight title
29	Win	29–0	(United Kingdom) Gary Buckland	TKO	11 (12), 1:46	7 May 2010	(United Kingdom) Kingsway Leisure Centre, Widnes, England	Retained British lightweight title; Won vacant European lightweight title
28	Win	28–0	(United Kingdom) Jon Thaxton	TKO	4 (12), 2:30	3 Oct 2009	(United Kingdom) Leisure Centre, Altrincham, England	Won vacant British lightweight title
27	Win	27–0	(United Kingdom) Scott Lawton	TKO	6 (12), 1:50	13 Jun 2009	(United Kingdom) Robin Park Arena, Wigan, England	
26	Win	26–0	(United Kingdom) Lee McAllister	TKO	8 (12), 1:00	17 Jan 2009	(United Kingdom) Robin Park Arena, Wigan, England	Retained British lightweight title
25	Win	25–0	(United Kingdom) Lee Meager	TKO	5 (12), 2:20	11 Jul 2008	(United Kingdom) Robin Park Arena, Wigan, England	Won vacant British lightweight title
24	Win	24–0	(Syria) Youssef Al Hamidi	PTS	8	10 May 2008	(United Kingdom) Nottingham Arena, Nottingham, England	
23	Win	23–0	(Mexico) Miguel Angel Munguia	UD	10	7 Dec 2007	(United States) MGM Grand Garden Arena, Paradise, Nevada, US	
22	Win	22–0	(United Kingdom) Dean Hickman	TKO	4 (10), 2:50	9 Nov 2007	(United Kingdom) Ice Centre, Nottingham, England	Won vacant English lightweight title
21	Win	21–0	(United States) Lorenzo Bethea	TKO	7 (10), 0:28	5 May 2007	(United States) MGM Grand Garden Arena, Paradise, Nevada, US	
20	Win	20–0	(Ghana) Ben Odamattey	TKO	5 (8), 2:33	20 Jan 2007	(United Kingdom) Alexandra Palace, London, England	
19	Win	19–0	(United Kingdom) Billy Smith	PTS	6	6 Oct 2006	(United Kingdom) Goresbrook Lesiure Centre, London, England	
18	Win	18–0	(Togo) Mouibi Sarouna	UD	10	15 Sep 2006	(United Kingdom) Alexandra Palace, London, England	Retained WBC Youth lightweight title
17	Win	17–0	(United Kingdom) Billy Smith	TKO	6 (6), 1:36	12 Jul 2006	(United Kingdom) York Hall, London, England	
16	Win	16–0	(Colombia) Ignacio Mendoza	TD	8 (10)	2 Dec 2005	(United Kingdom) Ice Centre, Nottingham, England	Won vacant WBC Youth lightweight title; Unanimous TD after Murray could not continue due to forehead swelling
15	Win	15–0	(United States) Tyrone Wiggins	KO	4 (8), 2:43	29 Oct 2005	Casino du Lac-Leamy, Gatineau, Quebec, Canada	
14	Win	14–0	(Azerbaijan) Azad Azizov	TKO	3 (8), 1:54	23 Sep 2005	(United Kingdom) George H Carnall Leisure Centre, Trafford, England	
13	Win	13–0	(United States) Johnny Walker	UD	6	6 Aug 2005	(United States) St. Pete Times Forum, Tampa, Florida, US	
12	Win	12–0	(France) Mounir Guebbas	PTS	8	8 Jul 2005	(United Kingdom) Leisure Centre, Altrincham, England	
11	Win	11–0	(United Kingdom) Karl Taylor	PTS	6	6 Mar 2005	(United Kingdom) Tara Leisure Centre, Shaw, England	
10	Win	10–0	(South Africa) Harry Ramogoadi	TKO	4 (4), 2:02	9 Dec 2004	(United Kingdom) Acton Court Hotel, Stockport, England	
9	Win	9–0	(United Kingdom) Daniel Thorpe	TKO	2 (6), 2:36	26 Nov 2004	(United Kingdom) Leisure Centre, Altrincham, England	
8	Win	8–0	(United Kingdom) Ernie Smith	PTS	4	31 Oct 2004	(United Kingdom) Tara Leisure Centre, Shaw, England	
7	Win	7–0	(Poland) Dariusz Snarski	TKO	2 (6)	24 Sep 2004	(United Kingdom) Ice Cenre, Nottingham, England	
6	Win	6–0	(United Kingdom) Anthony Hanna	PTS	4	2 Jun 2004	(United Kingdom) Ice Centre, Nottingham, England	
5	Win	5–0	(United Kingdom) John Paul Ryan	TKO	1 (4), 2:05	12 Mar 2004	(United Kingdom) Ice Centre, Nottingham, England	
4	Win	4–0	(United Kingdom) Norman Dhalie	TKO	2 (4), 2:37	30 Jan 2004	(United Kingdom) Goresbrook Leisure Centre, London, England	
3	Win	3–0	(United Kingdom) Jason Nesbitt	PTS	6	21 Dec 2003	(United Kingdom) Reebok Stadium, Bolton, England	
2	Win	2–0	(United Kingdom) Matthew Burke	KO	1 (4)	18 Oct 2003	(United Kingdom) MEN Arena, Manchester, England	
1	Win	1–0	(United Kingdom) Peter Buckley	PTS	4	6 Sep 2003	(United Kingdom) Leisure Centre, Huddersfield, England	Professional debut

Sporting positions
Regional boxing titles
Vacant Title last held by Nico Salzmann	WBC Youth lightweight champion 2 December 2005 – August 2007; Vacated	Vacant Title next held by Josesito López
Vacant Title last held by Scott Lawton	English lightweight champion 9 November 2007 – 11 July 2008; Won British title	Vacant Title next held by Martin Gethin
Vacant Title last held by Jonathon Thaxton	British lightweight champion 11 July 2008 – 12 June 2009; Stripped	Vacant Title next held by Himself
Vacant Title last held by Himself	British lightweight champion 3 October 2009 – 6 November 2010; Vacated	Vacant Title next held by Gavin Rees
Vacant Title last held by Anthony Mezaache	European lightweight champion 7 May 2010 – June 2011; Vacated	Vacant Title next held by Gavin Rees
