= Gavin Rees =

Wales boxer

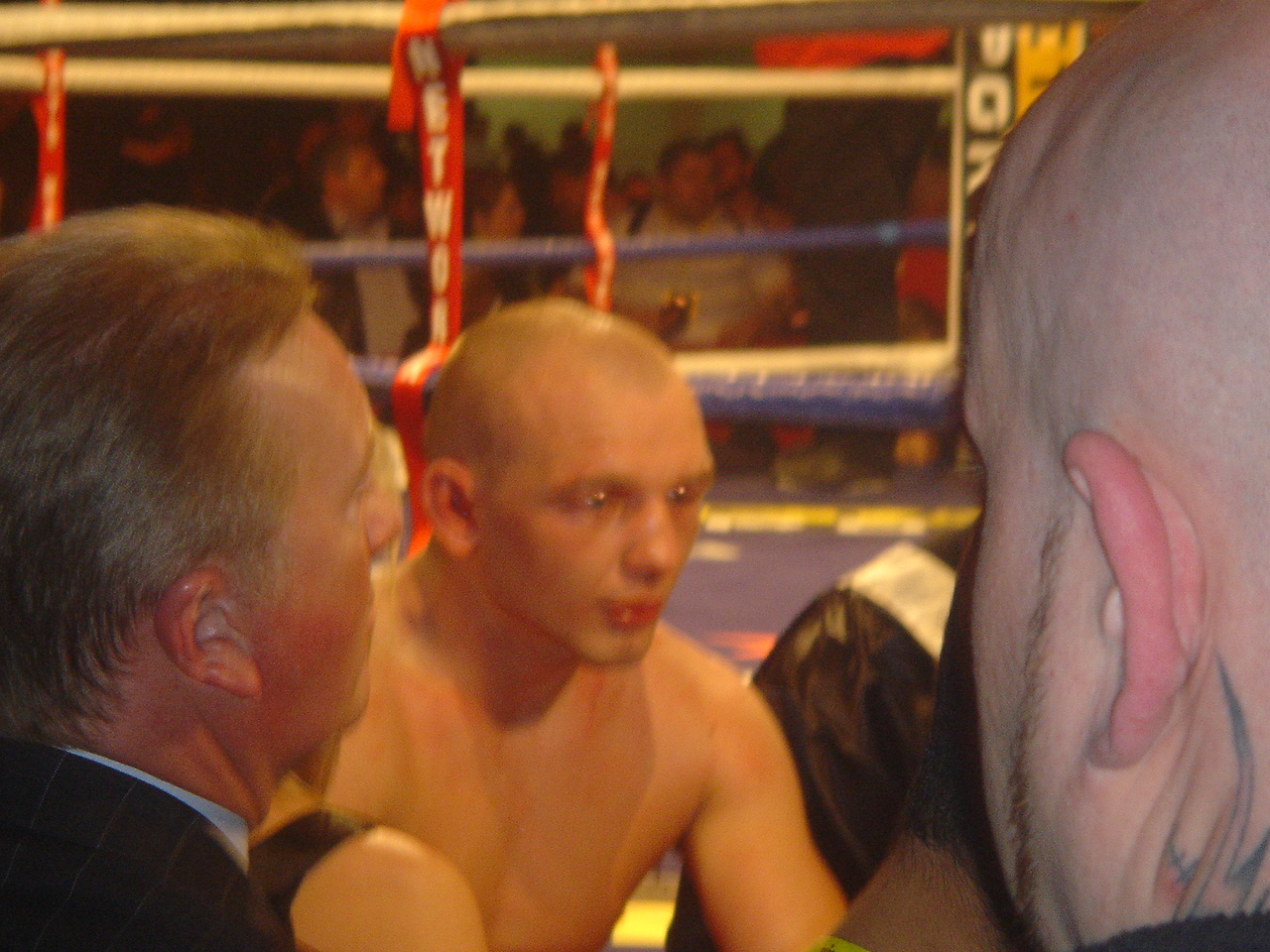
- Rees (middle) in 2008

Personal information
- Nickname: The Rock
- Born: 10 May 1980 (age 46) Newport, Wales
- Height: 5 ft 4 in (163 cm)
- Weight: Featherweight; Lightweight; Light welterweight

Boxing career
- Reach: 64 in (163 cm)
- Stance: Orthodox

Boxing record
- Total fights: 43
- Wins: 38
- Win by KO: 19
- Losses: 4
- Draws: 1

Gavin Rees (born 10 May 1980) is a Welsh boxing trainer and former professional boxer who competed from 1998 to 2014. He held the WBA (Regular) super lightweight title from 2007 to 2008. At regional level, he held the British lightweight title twice between 2010 and 2012, and the European lightweight title from 2011 to 2012.

== Career ==
After a successful amateur career, Rees turned professional in 1998.

=== World champion ===
In 2007, Rees defeated Souleymane M'baye to become the WBA Light Welterweight champion with a unanimous decision after 12 rounds.

Rees however lost his World title in his first defence via a 12th-round TKO loss to Andreas Kotelnik in March 2008.

=== Further success ===
Following his world title loss Rees was out of action for more than a year before returning in August 2009 to beat Johnny Greaves in 4 rounds. On 4 December, Rees entered the light welterweight prizefighter competition beating Ted Bami in the quarter-finals, Jason Cook in the semi-finals and Colin Lynes in the Final to win the £32,000 prize

Following his Prizefighter victory, Rees moved down to the (lightweight) division where he enjoyed instant success winning the British title in 2010 (which he then vacated). He has since won the European title in June 2011 and most recently regained the British title in July 2012.

Rees fought Adrien Broner for the World Boxing Council lightweight world title at Boardwalk Hall in Atlantic City, New Jersey on 16 February 2013. He lost the fight via 5th-round TKO.

== Professional boxing record ==
43 fights	38 wins	4 losses
By knockout	19	2
By decision	19	2
Draws	1	

No.	Result	Record	Opponent	Type	Round, time	Date	Location	Notes
43	Win	38–4–1	Gary Buckland	SD	12	17 May 2014	Motorpoint Arena, Cardiff, Wales, U.K.	
42	Loss	37–4–1	Gary Buckland	SD	12	1 Feb 2014	Motorpoint Arena, Cardiff, Wales, U.K.	
41	Loss	37–3–1	Anthony Crolla	MD	12	30 Jun 2013	Bolton Arena, Bolton, England, U.K.	For WBO Inter-Continental light-welterweight title
40	Loss	37–2–1	Adrien Broner	TKO	5 (12), 2:59	16 Feb 2013	Boardwalk Hall, Atlantic City, New Jersey, U.S.	For WBC lightweight title
39	Win	37–1–1	Derry Mathews	TKO	9 (12), 1:27	7 Jul 2012	Motorpoint Arena, Sheffield, England, U.K.	Retained European lightweight title; Won British lightweight title.
38	Win	36–1–1	Anthony Mezaache	TKO	7 (12), 2:15	23 Mar 2012	Gymnase Georges Racine, Clichy, France	Retained European lightweight title
37	Draw	35–1–1	Derry Mathews	TD	4 (12), 3:00	1 Oct 2011	Newport Leisure Centre, Newport, Wales, U.K.	Retained European lightweight title
36	Win	35–1	Andy Murray	UD	12	4 Jun 2011	Motorpoint Arena, Cardiff, Wales, U.K.	Won vacant European lightweight title
35	Win	34–1	John Watson	TKO	11 (12), 2:13	6 Nov 2010	Newport Leisure Centre, Newport, Wales, U.K.	Won vacant British lightweight title
34	Win	33–1	Sam Amoako	TKO	3 (6)	11 Jun 2010	King's Hall, Belfast, Northern Ireland, U.K.	
33	Win	32–1	Abdoulaye Soukouna	PTS	6	9 Apr 2010	Alexandra Palace, London, England, U.K.	
32	Win	31–1	Colin Lynes	UD	3	4 Dec 2009	Olympia, London, England, U.K.	Prizefighter: light-welterweight final
31	Win	30–1	Jason Cook	UD	3	4 Dec 2009	Olympia, London, England, U.K.	Prizefighter: light-welterweight semi-final
30	Win	29–1	Ted Bami	UD	3	4 Dec 2009	Olympia, London, England, U.K.	Prizefighter: light-welterweight quarter-final
29	Win	28–1	Johnny Greaves	RTD	4 (6), 3:00	21 Aug 2009	Newport Leisure Centre, Newport, Wales, U.K.	
28	Loss	27–1	Andreas Kotelnik	TKO	12 (12), 2:34	22 Mar 2008	Motorpoint Arena, Cardiff, Wales, U.K.	Lost WBA light-welterweight title
27	Win	27–0	Souleymane M'baye	UD	12	21 Jul 2007	Motorpoint Arena, Cardiff, Wales, U.K.	Won WBA light-welterweight title
56	Win	26–0	Billy Smith	PTS	6	7 Apr 2007	Millennium Stadium, Cardiff, Wales, U.K.	
25	Win	25–0	Chill John	PTS	8	18 Nov 2006	Newport Leisure Centre, Newport, Wales, U.K.	
24	Win	24–0	Martin Watson	PTS	6	8 Jul 2006	Millennium Stadium, Cardiff, Wales, U.K.	
23	Win	23–0	Daniel Thorpe	TKO	5 (6), 1:45	11 Mar 2006	Newport Leisure Centre, Newport, Wales, U.K.	
22	Win	22–0	Carl Allen	PTS	6	3 Sep 2004	Newport Leisure Centre, Newport, Wales, U.K.	
21	Win	21–0	Michael Muya	TKO	2 (8), 2:03	3 Jul 2004	Newport Leisure Centre, Newport, Wales, U.K.	
20	Win	20–0	Daniel Thorpe	TKO	5 (6), 2:44	28 Jun 2003	Newport Leisure Centre, Newport, Wales, U.K.	
19	Win	19–0	Andrey Devyataykin	PTS	6	15 Feb 2003	Conference Centre, Wembley, London, England, U.K.	
18	Win	18–0	Jimmy Beech	PTS	6	14 Dec 2002	Telewest Arena, Newcastle upon Tyne, England, U.K.	
17	Win	17–0	Serhiy Andriychikov	TKO	1 (6), 2:53	17 Aug 2002	Cardiff Castle, Cardiff, Wales, U.K.	
16	Win	16–0	Ernie Smith	TKO	5 (6), 1:21	8 Jul 2002	Grosvenor House, Mayfair, London, England, U.K.	
15	Win	15–0	Gary Flear	RTD	4 (6), 3:00	20 Apr 2002	Motorpoint Arena, Cardiff, Wales, U.K.	
14	Win	14–0	Rakhim Mingaleyev	PTS	6	12 Feb 2002	York Hall, Bethnal Green, London, England, U.K.	
13	Win	13–0	Nikolay Eremeev	UD	12	9 Oct 2001	Ice Rink, Cardiff, Wales, U.K.	Retained WBO Inter-Continental featherweight title
12	Win	12–0	Nigel Senior	TKO	2 (4), 1:57	21 Jul 2001	Ponds Forge Arena, Sheffield, Yorkshire, England, U.K.	
11	Win	11–0	Wladimir Borov	TKO	4 (12), 0:55	28 Apr 2001	Motorpoint Arena, Cardiff, Wales, U.K.	Won WBO Inter-Continental featherweight title.
10	Win	10–0	Chris Jikells	TKO	2 (6), 1:54	15 Jan 2001	Wythenshawe Forum, Manchester, England, U.K.	
9	Win	9–0	Steve Hanley	TD	1 (6)	13 Nov 2000	York Hall, Bethnal Green, London, England, U.K.	
8	Win	8–0	Peter Buckley	PTS	4	23 Sep 2000	York Hall, Bethnal Green, London, England, U.K.	
7	Win	7–0	Willie Valentine	TKO	3 (6)	29 May 2000	Wythenshawe Forum, Manchester, England, U.K.	
6	Win	6–0	Peter Buckley	PTS	4	19 Feb 2000	Goresbrook Leisure Centre, Dagenham, England, U.K.	
5	Win	5–0	Dave Hinds	TKO	2 (6), 2:46	11 Dec 1999	Everton Park Sports Centre, Liverpool, England, U.K.	
4	Win	4–0	Wayne Jones	TKO	2 (6), 0:35	5 Jun 1999	Motorpoint Arena, Cardiff, Wales, U.K.	
3	Win	3–0	Graham McGrath	TKO	2 (4), 2:40	27 Mar 1999	Derby Storm Arena, Derby, Derbyshire, England, U.K.	
2	Win	2–0	Ernie Smith	PTS	4	5 Dec 1998	Whitchurch Leisure Centre, Bristol, England, U.K.	
1	Win	1–0	John Farrell	PTS	4	5 Sep 1998	Ice Rink, Telford, Shropshire, England, U.K.	Professional debut.

== See also ==
- List of Welsh boxing world champions
- List of world light-welterweight boxing champions
- List of British world boxing champions

Sporting positions
Regional boxing titles
Vacant Title last held by John Murray	British lightweight champion 6 November 2010 – 2010; Vacated	Vacant Title next held by Anthony Crolla
Vacant Title last held by John Murray	European lightweight champion 4 June 2011 – 2012; Vacated	Vacant Title next held by Emiliano Marsili
Preceded by Derry Mathews	British lightweight champion 7 July 2012 – 2012; Vacated	Vacant Title next held by Martin Gethin
World boxing titles
Preceded by Souleymane M'baye	WBA super lightweight champion 21 July 2007 – 22 March 2008	Succeeded by Andreas Kotelnik
