= Jon Thaxton =

British boxer (born 1974)

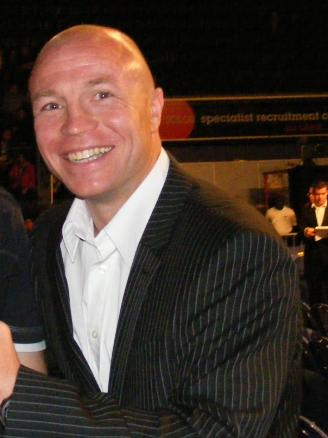

Personal information
- Nickname: Jono
- Nationality: British
- Born: Jonathan Lee Thaxton; 10 September 1974 (age 52) Norwich, England
- Height: 5 ft 6 in (168 cm)
- Weight: Lightweight; Light welterweight

Boxing career
- Stance: Southpaw

Boxing record
- Total fights: 45
- Wins: 34
- Win by KO: 19
- Losses: 11

Jonathan Lee Thaxton (born 10 September 1974) is a British former professional boxer who competed from 1992 to 2009. He held the British lightweight title from 2006 and 2007, and the EBU European title from 2008 to 2009.

== Professional career ==
He had his first professional fight in December 1992, beating Scott Smith on points over six rounds in Stoke on Trent. In his early career he fought as a light-welterweight. His first fight for a major title was in September 1996, when he won the WBO Intercontinental Light-Welterweight title, beating Bernard Paul of Mauritius on points. In November 1997, he won the IBF Intercontinental Light-Welterweight title, beating Rimvidas Bilius of Lithuania on points. In September 1998, he lost both titles, when he lost to the American, Emanuel Augustus, being knocked out in the seventh.

In November 1999, he fought Jason Rowland for the British light-welterweight title, losing when the fight was stopped in the fifth on a cut despite having flooded the champion twice in the fourth. In October 2000, he had another shot at the now vacant British light-welterweight title when he fought Ricky Hatton. Despite Hatton being cut badly in the first round, he went on to defeat Thaxton on points. In February 2002, he fought Eamonn Magee for the Commonwealth light-welterweight title, losing when the fight was stopped in the sixth after Thaxton had already been down in the third round.

Between 2002 and 2004, Thaxton spent two years out of the ring with a shoulder injury after a road accident.

=== WBF title ===
In April 2005, he knocked out Frenchman Christophe De Busillet in the fourth, to take the vacant World Boxing Foundation (WBFo) world lightweight title. In September 2005, he defended the title against Romanian Vasile Dragomir, scoring a knockout in the fourth round.

=== British title ===
In December 2006, he fought Lee Meager, the holder of the British lightweight title. Thaxton scored a unanimous points victory to take the title. In March 2007, he defended the British lightweight title against Scott Lawton, winning by a technical knockout in the seventh. In October 2007, he defended the British lightweight title again, this time against Dave Stewart, winning by a technical knockout in the twelfth round.

=== European title challenge ===
In April 2008, he challenged Yuri Romanov, of Belarus, for his European lightweight title. The fight was stopped at the start of the sixth when Thaxton's corner refused to let him come out due to bad cuts. This was Thaxton's first defeat after twelve straight wins. On 4 October 2008, Thaxton captured the vacated European lightweight title in the third round of the contest against Spaniard Juan Carlos Melero Diaz.

== Titles ==
  - IBF Inter-Continental light-welterweight champion
  - WBO Inter-Continental light welterweight champion
  - WBF World Lightweight champion
  - British Lightweight champion
  - European Lightweight champion

== Professional boxing record ==
45 fights	34 wins	11 losses
By knockout	19	6
By decision	15	5

Key to abbreviations used for results
DQ	Disqualification	RTD	Corner retirement
KO	Knockout	SD	Split decision / split draw
MD	Majority decision / majority draw	TD	Technical decision / technical draw
NC	No contest	TKO	Technical knockout
PTS	Points decision	UD	Unanimous decision / unanimous draw

Boxing record
No.	Result	Record	Opponent	Type	Round(s), time	Date	Location	Notes
45	Loss	34–11	(United Kingdom) John Murray	TKO	4 (12)	3 Oct 2009	(United Kingdom) Altrincham Leisure Centre, Altrincham, England	For vacant British lightweight title
44	Loss	34–10	(United Kingdom) Tom Glover	PTS	8	18 Jul 2009	(United Kingdom) York Hall, London, England	
43	Loss	34–9	(France) Anthony Mazaache	UD	12	28 Feb 2009	(United Kingdom) Norwich Showground, Norwich, England	Lost EBU European lightweight title
42	Win	34–8	(Spain) Juan Carlos Melero Diaz	KO	3 (12)	4 Oct 2008	(United Kingdom) Norwich Showground, Norwich, England	Won Vacant EBU European lightweight title
41	Loss	33–8	(Belarus) Yuri Romanov	TKO	6 (12)	4 Apr 2008	(United Kingdom) York Hall, London, England	For EBU European lightweight title
40	Win	33–7	(United Kingdom) Dave Stewart	TKO	12 (12), 1:24	5 Oct 2007	(United Kingdom) York Hall, London, England	Retained British lightweight title
39	Win	32–7	(United Kingdom) Scott Lawton	TKO	7 (12), 2:40	16 Mar 2007	(United Kingdom) Norwich Showground, Norwich, England	Retained British lightweight title
38	Win	31–7	(United Kingdom) Lee Meager	UD	12	8 Dec 2006	(United Kingdom) Goresbrook Leisure Centre, London, England	Won British lightweight title
37	Win	30–7	(Argentina) Jorge Daniel Miranda	PTS	10	13 May 2006	(United Kingdom) Ponds Forge Arena, Sheffield, England	
36	Win	29–7	(United Kingdom) Alan Temple	TKO	5 (8)	17 Feb 2006	(United Kingdom) York Hall, London, England	
35	Win	28–7	(Romania) Vasile Dragomir	KO	4 (12), 0:20	3 Sep 2005	(United Kingdom) Carrow Road, Norwich, England	Retained WBF lightweight title
34	Win	27–7	(France) Christophe De Busillet	KO	4 (12)	9 Apr 2005	(United Kingdom) Sports Village, Norwich, England	Won WBF lightweight title
33	Win	26–7	(United Kingdom) Carl Allen	KO	1 (4), 1:41	13 Dec 2004	(United Kingdom) Holiday Inn, Birmingham, England	
32	Win	25–7	(Nigeria) Silence Saheed	PTS	6	9 Oct 2004	(United Kingdom) Sports Village, Norwich, England	
31	Win	24–7	(Russia) Victor Baranov	TKO	1 (8)	21 Sep 2002	(United Kingdom) Sports Village, Norwich, England	
30	Win	23–7	(Belgium) Mark Waelkens	TKO	7 (8)	15 Jun 2002	(United Kingdom) Sports Village, Norwich, England	
29	Win	22–7	(United Kingdom) Chill John	TKO	2 (8)	13 Apr 2002	(United Kingdom) Sports Village, Norwich, England	
28	Loss	21–7	(Republic of Ireland) Eamonn Magee	TKO	6 (12)	9 Feb 2002	(United Kingdom) M.E.N. Arena, Manchester, England	For Commonwealth light welterweight title
27	Win	21–6	(United Kingdom) David Kirk	PTS	4	28 Jul 2001	(United Kingdom) Conference Centre, London, England	
26	Win	20–6	(United Kingdom) Alan Temple	PTS	4	26 Mar 2001	(United Kingdom) Conference Centre, London, England	
25	Loss	19–6	(United Kingdom) Ricky Hatton	PTS	12	21 Oct 2000	(United Kingdom) Conference Centre, London, England	For vacant British light welterweight title
24	Win	19–5	(Ivory Coast) Kimoun Kouassi	TKO	3 (8)	15 Jul 2000	(United Kingdom) Sports Village, Norwich, England	
23	Loss	18–5	(United Kingdom) Jason Rowland	TKO	5 (12)	15 Nov 1999	(United Kingdom) York Hall, London, England	For British light welterweight title
22	Win	18–4	(United Kingdom) Brian Coleman	PTS	6	7 Aug 1999	(United Kingdom) Goresbrook Leisure Centre, Essex, England	
21	Win	17–4	(United Kingdom) Karl Taylor	PTS	6	15 May 1999	(United Kingdom) Ponds Forge Arena, Sheffield, England	
20	Loss	16–4	(United States) Emanuel Augustus	TKO	7 (12)	26 Sep 1998	(United Kingdom) Sports Village, Norwich, England	Lost IBF and WBO Inter-Continental light welterweight titles
19	Win	16–3	(Lithuania) Rimvydas Bilius	UD	12	29 Nov 1997	(United Kingdom) Sports Village, Norwich, England	Retained IBF Inter-Continental light welterweight title
18	Win	15–3	(Armenia) Gagik Khachatryan	TKO	2 (12)	28 Jun 1997	(United Kingdom) Sports Village, Norwich, England	
17	Win	14–3	(United Kingdom) Paul Burke	TKO	9 (12)	27 Mar 1997	(United Kingdom) Sports Village, Norwich, England	Retained WBO Inter-Continental light welterweight title
16	Win	13–3	(Mauritius) Bernard Paul	PTS	12	14 Sep 1996	(United Kingdom) Concord Centre, Sheffield, England	Retained IBF Inter-Continental light welterweight title; Won vacant WBO Inter-Continental light welterweight title
15	Win	12–3	(United Kingdom) Mark Elliot	KO	5 (12)	25 Jun 1996	(United Kingdom) Mansfield Leisure Centre, Mansfield, England	Won vacant IBF Inter-Continental light welterweight title
14	Win	11–3	(United Kingdom) Paul Ryan	TKO	1 (10)	13 Feb 1996	(United Kingdom) York Hall, London, England	
13	Win	10–3	(United Kingdom) John O'Johnson	TKO	4 (6)	20 Jan 1996	(United Kingdom) Mansfield Leisure Centre, Mansfield, England	
12	Loss	9–3	(United Kingdom) Colin Dunne	TKO	5 (10)	8 Dec 1995	(United Kingdom) York Hall, London, England	For vacant British Southern Area lightweight title
11	Loss	9–2	(Netherlands) Rene Prins	PTS	8	12 Aug 1995	Zaandam, Netherlands	
10	Win	9–1	(United Kingdom) Delroy Leslie	PTS	6	23 Jun 1995	(United Kingdom) York Hall, London, England	
9	Win	8–1	(United Kingdom) David Thompson	TKO	6 (6)	26 May 1995	(United Kingdom) Norwich Lads Boxing Club, Norwich, England	
8	Loss	7–1	(United Kingdom) Keith Marner	PTS	10	18 Nov 1994	(United Kingdom) Bracknell Leisure Centre, Bracknell, England	Lost British Southern Area light welterweight title
7	Win	7–0	(United Kingdom) B. F. Williams	TKO	4 (10)	10 Mar 1994	(United Kingdom) Town Hall, Watford, England	Won vacant British Southern Area light welterweight title
6	Win	6–0	(United Kingdom) Dean Hollington	TKO	3 (8)	7 Dec 1993	(United Kingdom) York Hall, London, England	
5	Win	5–0	(United Kingdom) John Smith	PTS	6	22 Sep 1993	(United Kingdom) Wembley Conference Centre, London, England	
4	Win	4–0	(United Kingdom) Brian Coleman	PTS	8	23 Jun 1993	(United Kingdom) Ocean Rooms, Gorleston, England	
3	Win	3–0	(United Kingdom) John O'Johnson	PTS	6	17 Mar 1993	(United Kingdom) European Sporting Club, Stoke-on-Trent, England	
2	Win	2–0	(United Kingdom) Dean Hiscox	PTS	6	3 Mar 1993	(United Kingdom) Civic Hall, Solihull, England	
1	Win	1–0	(United Kingdom) Scott Smith	PTS	6	9 Dec 1992	(United Kingdom) European Sporting Club, Stoke-on-Trent, England	

== See also ==
- List of British lightweight boxing champions
