= Lee Meager =

British former professional boxer (born 1978)

Personal information
- Nickname: Macho Man
- Nationality: British
- Born: Lee Terence Meager; 18 January 1978 (age 48) Salford, Greater Manchester, England
- Height: 5 ft 8 in (1.73 m)
- Weight: Lightweight

Boxing career
- Stance: Orthodox

Boxing record
- Total fights: 26
- Wins: 21
- Win by KO: 8
- Losses: 3
- Draws: 2
- No contests: 0

Lee Meager (born 18 January 1978) is a British former professional boxer who competed from 2000 to 2008. He held the British lightweight title in 2006 and challenged for the same title in 2008.

== Professional career ==
He had his first professional fight in September 2000, when he beat Peter Buckley on points over four rounds at York Hall, Bethnal Green.

He won 16 of his first 17 fights, drawing the other, before losing on points to Danny Hunt in a fight for the English lightweight title on 19 November 2004.

In May 2006, Meager fought Dave Stewart for the vacant British lightweight title. The fight was at Bethnal Green, and Meager won when the fight was stopped in the sixth.

In December 2006, Meager defended his title against Jonathan Thaxton, at Dagenham. Thaxton won on a unanimous points decision after twelve rounds, to take Meager’s title.

Since losing his title, Meager has had a four-round win against Hungarian, Laszlo Komjathi, and has drawn against Mexican, Jose Alberto Gonzalez in Las Vegas.

Meager fought for the vacant British lightweight title in July 2008 against John Murray, losing in the 5th round when the referee stopped the fight. Afterward, he retired from the ring.

== Professional boxing record ==
23 fights	22 wins	1 loss
By knockout	21	1
By decision	1	0

No.	Result	Record	Opponent	Type	Round, time	Date	Location	Notes
26	Loss	21–3–2	(United Kingdom) John Murray	TKO	5 (12), 2:20	11 Jul 2008	(United Kingdom) Robin Park Centre, Wigan, England	For vacant British lightweight title
25	Draw	21–2–2	(Mexico) Jose Alberto Gonzalez	PTS	8	7 Dec 2007	(United States) MGM Grand, Las Vegas, Nevada, U.S.	
24	Win	21–2–1	(Hungary) Laszlo Komjathi	RTD	4 (10), 3:00	7 Sep 2007	(United Kingdom) Doncaster Dome, Doncaster, England	
23	Loss	20–2–1	(United Kingdom) Jon Thaxton	UD	12	8 Dec 2006	(United Kingdom) Goresbrook Leisure Centre, Essex, England	Lost British lightweight title
22	Win	20–1–1	(United Kingdom) Dave Stewart	TKO	6 (12), 1:34	12 May 2006	(United Kingdom) York Hall, London, England	Won vacant British lightweight title
21	Win	19–1–1	(United Kingdom) Ben Hudson	PTS	4	17 Feb 2006	(United Kingdom) York Hall, London, England	
20	Win	18–1–1	(Serbia) Tony Montana	PTS	8	2 Dec 2005	(United Kingdom) Nottingham Arena, Nottingham, England	
19	Win	17–1–1	(United Kingdom) Martin Watson	PTS	10	9 Sep 2005	(United Kingdom) Nottingham Arena, Nottingham, England	
18	Loss	16–1–1	(United Kingdom) Danny Hunt	PTS	10	19 Nov 2004	(United Kingdom) York Hall, London, England	For English lightweight title
17	Win	16–0–1	(Kenya) Michael Muya	PTS	8	2 Jun 2004	(United Kingdom) Nottingham Arena, Nottingham, England	
16	Win	15–0–1	(United Kingdom) Charles Shepherd	RTD	7 (10), 3:00	11 Dec 2003	(United Kingdom) York Hall, London, England	
15	Win	14–0–1	(United Kingdom) Peter Buckley	PTS	4	28 Nov 2003	(United Kingdom) Derby Storm Arena, Derby, England	
14	Win	13–0–1	(United Kingdom) Carl Allen	PTS	8	28 Jan 2003	(United Kingdom) Nottingham Arena, Nottingham, England	
13	Win	12–0–1	(Saint Vincent and the Grenadines) Chill John	TKO	5 (8), 0:59	21 Dec 2002	(United Kingdom) Goresbrook Leisure Centre, Essex, England	
12	Win	11–0–1	(United Kingdom) Iain Eldridge	TKO	5 (10), 1:58	25 Oct 2002	(United Kingdom) York Hall, London, England	
11	Win	10–0–1	(United Kingdom) Peter Buckley	PTS	6	10 May 2002	(United Kingdom) York Hall, London, England	
10	Win	9–0–1	(United Kingdom) Jason Nesbitt	PTS	4	16 Mar 2002	(United Kingdom) York Hall, London, England	
9	Win	8–0–1	(United Kingdom) Arv Mittoo	PTS	6	13 Sep 2001	(United Kingdom) Ponds Forge Arena, Sheffield, England	
8	Win	7–0–1	(United Kingdom) Steve Hanley	PTS	6	31 Jul 2001	(United Kingdom) York Hall, London, England	
7	Win	6–0–1	(United Kingdom) Jason White	PTS	4	12 May 2001	(United Kingdom) The Pavilions, Plymouth, England	
6	Win	5–0–1	(United Kingdom) Lenny Hodgkins	TKO	3 (4), 1:12	13 Mar 2001	(United Kingdom) The Pavilions, Plymouth, England	
5	Draw	4–0–1	(United Kingdom) Carl Allen	PTS	6	5 Feb 2001	(United Kingdom) City Hall, Hull, England	
4	Win	4–0	(United Kingdom) Jason Nesbitt	TKO	2 (6)	9 Dec 2000	(United Kingdom) Elephant & Castle Centre, London, England	
3	Win	3–0	(United Kingdom) Billy Smith	TKO	1 (4)	18 Nov 2000	(United Kingdom) Goresbrook Leisure Centre, Essex, England	
2	Win	2–0	(United Kingdom) Chris Jickells	PTS	4	14 Oct 2000	(United Kingdom) Conference Centre, London	
1	Win	1–0	(United Kingdom) Peter Buckley	PTS	4	16 Sep 2000	(United Kingdom) York Hall, London, England	

== See also ==
- List of British lightweight boxing champions
