= Anthony Crolla =

British boxer (born 1986)

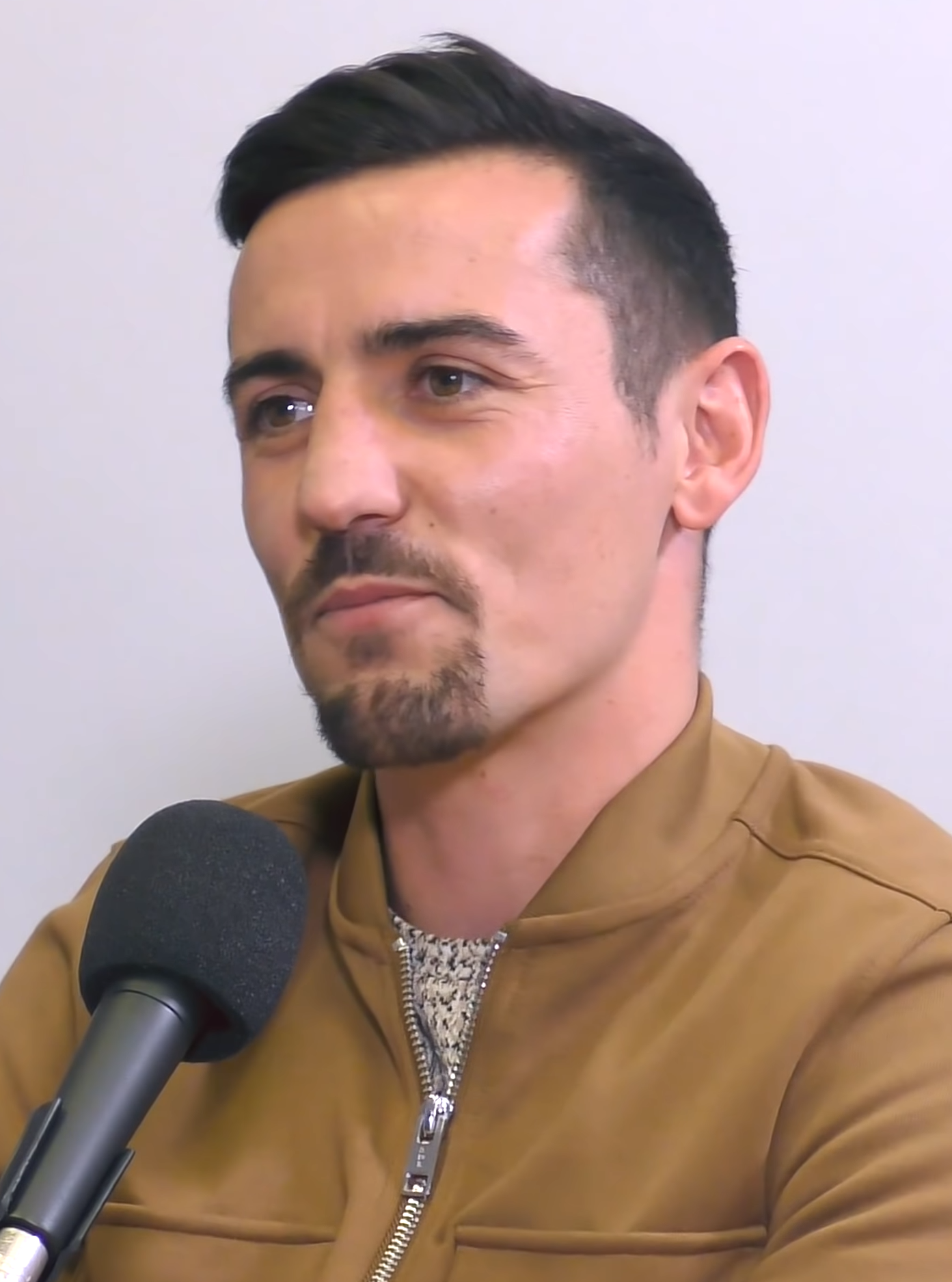
- Crolla in 2020

Personal information
- Nickname: Million Dolla
- Nationality: British
- Born: 16 November 1986 (age 39) Manchester, England
- Height: 5 ft 8 1/2 in (174 cm)
- Weight: Super featherweight; Lightweight

Boxing career
- Reach: 67 in (170 cm)
- Stance: Orthodox

Boxing record
- Total fights: 45
- Wins: 35
- Win by KO: 13
- Losses: 7
- Draws: 3

Anthony Crolla (born 16 November 1986) is a British former professional boxer who competed from 2006 to 2019. He held the WBA lightweight title from 2015 to 2016.

== Professional career ==
=== Early career ===
Crolla made his professional debut on 14 October 2006 when he scored a points win over Abdul Rashid at the MEN Arena in Manchester. Five more fights throughout the rest of the year and into 2007 resulted in five more victories giving Crolla an unbeaten record of 6–0 at the end of his first full year as a professional. Crolla begun 2008 with a win in Germany on 19 January beating Tomasz Kwiecien and followed this up with another victory on 14 March, traveling to the Old Trafford Stadium to beat journeyman Steve Gethin. On 5 April however, in his third fight of the year so far, Crolla lost his unbeaten record to Syrian Youssef Al Hamidi at the Bolton Arena, losing on points over 8 rounds. Two fights in September resulted in Crolla returning to winning ways against Robin Deakin on the 6th and then traveling to the York Hall in Bethnal Green on the 26th to meet Al Hamidi once more and to gain a revenge win over six rounds. Crolla finished 2008 with further victories over Carl Allen in October and Jon Baguley in December finishing the year with a record of 12–1.

=== Career from 2009 to 2011 ===
Crolla begun 2009 on 14 March with a repeat victory over former opponent Carl Allen and then on 29 May took part in his most significant bout to date, a British title eliminator at the Fenton Manor Sports Complex in Stoke. The fight resulted in a second career defeat for Crolla as he lost a ten-round points decision to Gary Sykes. On 25 September, he returned to ring and scored another victory over an opponent he had already met, Jon Baguley and then on 27 November met and defeated the former world champion Michael Brodie who had returned to the ring following a long lay off. He continued his winning run in 2010 with victories over Jason Nesbitt, Sid Razak and Chris Riley before on 2 October challenging Andy Morris for the English super featherweight title. The fight at the De Vere Whites hotel in Bolton resulted in a 7th round stoppage for Crolla and a first career title.

=== British lightweight champion ===
Crolla stepped up a weight division when on 12 February 2011 he challenged John Watson for the vacant British lightweight title. Described as an "early contender for fight of the year" Crolla won the fight in the 9th round after scoring a 9th-round knockout. Describing his move up a weight division after the fight Crolla said "I knew I'd be strong enough at lightweight, but I didn't know I'd be that strong. I'm in with strong kids in the gym all the time and they say my strength is underrated. But even I couldn't believe how strong I was." On 16 March, Crolla vs. Gavin Rees was added to the Amir Khan-Paul McCloskey WBA title fight undercard on 16 April at the MEN Arena in Manchester. Rees pulled out of the fight on 24 March due to a nose injury.

On 21 April 2012, Crolla lost his British lightweight title to 28-year-old Liverpudlian Derry Matthews at the Oldham Sports Centre. Matthews knocked Crolla down in the 3rd round, and the fight was eventually stopped with four seconds remaining in the 6th round.

==== Prizefighter ====
In September 2012, Crolla entered the Prize-Fighter Series for lightweights. The tournament took place on 6 October at the Liverpool Olympia. Entering the tournament, Crolla was the favourite to win. A day earlier it was announced that Crolla would fight Stephen Jennings in the quarter finals. Crolla won the fight after 3 rounds in what many felt was the best display of the night. Crolla reached the semi-final stage, losing a very close points decision that could have gone either way to Gary Sykes. Sykes went on to lose to Terry Flanagan in the final.

==== Crolla vs. Farrell ====
Kieran Farrell was at the time a young up and coming prospect that had beaten the 14 opponents put before him. His new promoter Dave Coldwell fancied his fighters chances against Crolla, feeling he may be on the slide. Crolla beat Farrell; just after the final bell Farrell collapsed and was rushed to hospital. He had had a brain injury during the contest and would no longer be able to box.

=== Career from 2013 to 2014 ===
==== Crolla vs. Matthews II ====
A rematch between Crolla and Matthews took place on 30 March 2013. The fight ended in draw, with one judge scoring the fight 115-115, whilst the remaining two gave Crolla and Matthews 115-113 apiece. Crolla started the fight very cautious and allowed Matthews to score without much reply. The middle rounds were closer and Crolla took the later rounds.

==== WBO Inter-Continental title ====
On 30 June 2013, Crolla upset former WBA light-welterweight champion Gavin Rees (37-2-1, 18 KOs) with a majority decision at the Bolton Arena in Bolton. The judges scored it 115-113 and 116–113 to Crolla, with one scoring it 115-115. The fight was scheduled to take place on the undercard of David Haye vs. Manuel Charr, but that fight was called of when Haye had a hand injury.

Crolla was scheduled to make his first defence of the title on the undercard of Carl Froch vs. George Groves at the Phones 4u Arena in Manchester against former WBU and European super featherweight champion Stephen Foster Jr. (31-4-1, 18 KO) on 23 November 2013. Foster was a late step in, as originally, Crolla was due to fight Martin Gethin for the British title. Foster was due to fight Michael Katsidis in Australia, but pulled out to fight Crolla in his hometown instead. Foster took a beating, retiring on his stool after six rounds, giving Crolla the stoppage win. Crolla returned to the Phones 4u Arena on 19 April 2014 against British boxer John Murray. The fight was billed as the 'Battle of Manchester'. It was known that Crolla and Murray former gym pals and friends outside of the ring. Crolla won the fight via a 10th round stoppage, in a brutal fight. After the fight, Crolla told Sky Sports, "It was even tougher than I expected. No matter how tough that looked, me and John were the luckiest men in this arena." Murray admitted the best man won.

Crolla made his third and final defence on 13 September against Mexican boxer Gamaliel Díaz at the Phones 4u Arena. In the third round, following an accidental clash of heads, Díaz was left with a bad cut over the eye and not able to continue. The fight was ruled a technical draw after the round. Crolla was unsure whether Díaz had the desire to continue. He told Sky Sports, "I'm not speaking bad of Gamaliel Díaz. It's a technical draw, the doctor ruled he was unable to continue, but I felt like he was happy with that." Promoter Eddie Hearn later went on to say, "I'll speak to the doctor because if the fighter chooses not to continue then I don't believe it's a technical draw. If the referee stops the fight on the advice of the doctor then it is a technical draw, but it looked like he didn't want to come out. I think he was happy to accept the technical draw."

==== World title cancellation ====
Crolla was scheduled to fight Richar Abril of Cuba for the WBA lightweight title in January 2015.

This fight was cancelled after Crolla suffered a broken ankle and a fractured skull during a burglary. Crolla confronted two burglars who were raiding a neighbour's house. Crolla was able to catch one of the intruders, but was then attacked by the other with a lump of concrete. Derry Matthews was picked to replace Crolla, but instead fought Tony Luis, who took the fight on four days notice, winning the interim WBA lightweight title.

=== WBA lightweight champion ===
==== Crolla vs. Pérez I, II ====
Crolla received his first opportunity at a world title against WBA lightweight champion Darleys Pérez on 18 July 2015 at the Manchester Arena in Manchester. The fight ended in a controversial split decision draw. Crolla seemed like the clear winner after Pérez twice had pointed deducted for low blows. One judge had the fight 116-111 for Crolla, the other two judges scored it a 113–113 draw. In the post fight, Crolla told Sky Sports, "I'm bitterly disappointed I've not got the world title take to home with me. I thought the deductions swayed it for me."

A day later, promoter Eddie Hearn stated that he would speak to the WBA to get an immediate rematch ordered. Hearn believed Crolla by at least four rounds and his trainer Joe Gallagher saw him win by two rounds. Hearn told Sky Sports, "I've emailed the WBA complaining about the points decision and asking for an immediate rematch. If there were two points deducted how could they have given the fight to Perez by two rounds? No way."

On 30 July 2015, the WBA officially ordered the rematch between Crolla and Pérez. Hearn announced the fight would take place on 21 November at the Manchester Arena. Crolla won the WBA title with a knockout win over Pérez in round 5. The punch which dropped Pérez was a left hook to the body. He was unable to beat the count. Crolla told Sky Sports, "I've dreamt this dream since I was 10 years of age. I didn't know it would be this good, honestly. It's even better than I dreamt."

==== Crolla vs. Barroso ====
On 11 March 2016, Sky Sports announced that Crolla would make his first defence of his WBA lightweight title against mandatory challenger Ismael Barroso (19-0-2, 18 KOs) at the Manchester Arena on 7 May. Barroso was known for displaying his punch power in a chilling knockout win over Kevin Mitchell in December 2015. Talking about Barroso, Crolla said, "For some strange reason, there was a few people out there who thought I was going to try and swerve Ismael Barroso. Listen when you're world champion, you try and fight the best challengers out there." At the time, Crolla was also offered £500,000 to fight the winner of WBO champion Terry Flanagan vs. Derry Matthews, which was taking place on 12 March. Crolla stated that with the offer, he would have had to surrender his WBA title. He was not likely to do so, just for a big payday. Crolla won the fight, retaining the WBA title. The opening five rounds saw Crolla take a lot of clean shots. Barroso began to tire following round 6, and Crolla took control. Crolla hurt Barroso with a right to the head that staggered him. He was able to land several more right hands before the end of the round. Barroso looked as though he had nothing left. In round 7, Barroso landed some shots, but lacked the power at this stage to hurt Crolla. Crolla landed several hard shots before dropping Barroso with a right to the body. Barroso got to one knee but wasn't able to beat the count. At the time of stoppage, Crolla was behind on all three judges scorecards (56–58, 55–59 twice).

=== Consecutive defeats ===
==== Crolla vs. Linares ====
On 15 June, it was announced on Sky Sports that a deal had been made for Crolla to fight WBC 'Diamond' champion Jorge Linares (40–3. 27 KOs) on 24 September at the Manchester Arena. Crolla's WBA world lightweight title will also be at stake as well as the Ring Magazine world championship. Crolla, who was named Ring Magazine's Most Inspirational fighter of 2015, said it would be 'a dream come true' if he can beat Linares and claim the Ring Magazine title. In front of the hometown crowd, Crolla was rocked in round 6 following a right hook as the fight went the distance. The judges scored the fight 115–114, 117-111 and 115–113 in favour of Linares. This was Crolla's first loss in 10 fights and regarded by many a close contest filled with action throughout. An immediate rematch was discussed post fight.

==== Crolla vs. Linares II ====
Reports in early December suggested a rematch could possibly take place in Manchester on 25 March 2017. The winner of the rematch would then be ordered to fight the winner of the Dejan Zlaticanin vs. Mikey Garcia, due to take place January, which was won by Garcia, in a unification fight. All three titles would be at stake in the rematch, with Eddie Hearn due to make an announcement in 2017. An official announcement was made on 4 January 2017, for the fight take place at the Manchester Arena in Manchester, a city which Linares said was open to returning to. The WBA, WBC Diamond and Ring magazine world lightweight titles would be at stake. The fight would be televised live on Sky Sports in the UK and on 24 January, Showtime announced they would cover the fight in the United States. Both fighters weighed in at 134.4 pounds.

On fight night, in front of 13,000 fans, Crolla was dropped in the seventh round by a left uppercut, and went the distance to lose by wider margins (119-109 on all three scorecards) than the first fight. Crolla started off well hitting to body, but Linares quickly capitalised and started connected well to the body and landing combinations of uppercuts. Linares put in a more solid and dominant performance than their first encounter. At the end of round 11, Crolla's trainer Joe Gallagher came into the ring and walked towards referee Howard John Foster, possibly to stop the fight. After Crolla pleaded with him, Gallagher allowed him to go the distance. With the win, Linares retained the WBA, The Ring and WBC Diamond lightweight titles.

In the post-fight interview, he thanked his promoter Oscar De Le Hoya for making the trip and watching him ringside and said his next move would be a big pay day in Las Vegas against WBC lightweight champion Mikey Garcia. Crolla apologized to the live attendance, admitted he lost to the better man and said he would be back to rebuild, "Manchester, I am so sorry I couldn't do it for you. Your support means so much to me. He caught me but before that I thought I could get to him. I got beaten by the better man - no excuses. I am 30 years old, I am going to rest, but I believe I can go again." Both fighters embraced at the final bell and showed respect. Crolla meditated around moving up to super lightweight. This was the first time Crolla had lost consecutive fights and losing to the same opponent twice after his losses to Gary Sykes in 2009 and 2012.

=== Later career ===
==== Crolla vs. Burns ====
On 7 July 2017, STV news reported there was talks between Crolla and Ricky Burns (41-6-1, 14 KOs) about a potential all-British fight towards the end of 2017. Talks suggested a fight would likely take place in Manchester or Glasgow at light-welterweight. A provisional date of 14 October 2017 was being considered. Both boxers tweeted a day earlier confirming their interest in the fight. Burns told Sky Sports, he agreed to the fight straight away when he first heard about the speculations. He said, both he and Crolla were in the same position, coming off losses. At the time, Burn's compatriot Josh Taylor had been calling him out for an all Scottish showdown. Crolla admitted the fight would be a 'make or break' fight for both of them and could steer the defeated boxer into retirement, whereas the winner could line himself up for another potential world title fight. On 7 August 2017, it was confirmed by Eddie Hearn that a deal had been reached between Crolla and Burns for a fight to take place at lightweight on 7 October, live on Sky Sports. Manchester Arena was confirmed as the venue, marking it the first time Burns would fight in Manchester. Hearn spoke to Sky Sports about the fight, "What a fight between two great warriors. Both Anthony and Ricky are in similar places in the careers and they know that this absolute must-win. Knowing these two like I do this is going to be a fight until the finishing bell with neither taking a backward step. It's an all-British super fight between two great [former] world champions." Crolla won the fight via 12 round unanimous decision. In the end, the three judges' scored the fight 116–113, 117–112, 116–114. Sky pundits at ringside had either Crolla winning or a draw, however non believed Burns had done enough to warrant a win. Crolla was the busier fighter throwing much more than Burns and focused a lot of his body shots. Burns made Crolla miss a lot with his movement and looked to land cleaner and accurate punches. Both fighters embraced in the end, as they had shown mutual respect for one another in the build up. In the post fight, Crolla said, "I thought I definitely did enough. He just kept coming, he gave me a very tough fight, but I thought my quality shots won it." Burns felt he did enough to win the fight saying, "Although it was close, I thought I did enough, thought I landed the cleaner shots. In my eyes, I thought I just edged it." Crolla also said he would be willing to travel to Glasgow for a rematch.

On 19 March 2018, Hearn announced that Crolla would fight on 31 March at the Principality Stadium in Cardiff on the undercard of the heavyweight unification fight between Anthony Joshua and Joseph Parker on Sky Sports Box Office. His opponent was announced as Mexican boxer Edson Ramirez, who was on an 18-fight win streak. The fight went the 10 round distance with Crolla doing just enough to win the rounds. The final judges' scorecards were 100–91, 100-90 and 98–92 in favour of Crolla. Ramirez focused on the body attack and was given 2 warnings from the referee for landing body shots that he felt were low. Crolla was cut over his right eye in the round 3.

==== Crolla vs. Yordan ====
In August 2018, according to trainer Joe Gallagher, Vasiliy Lomachenko was interested in a possible fight with Crolla in the UK. On 17 September, it was reported that Crolla would return to the Manchester Arena on 10 November on the Oleksandr Usyk vs. Tony Bellew undercard. Indonesian boxer Daud Yordan was considered a possible opponent. Yordan, a former two-time IBO world champion, had a record of 38 wins, 26 by KO and 3 losses. On 24 September, the fight was confirmed by Hearn and was likely to be a final eliminator for the WBA lightweight title, at the time, held by Lomachenko. Yordan was ranked #2 by the WBO and WBA at lightweight the time. Crolla defeated Yordan via a 12-round unanimous decision to earn a title shot against Lomachenko. Crolla outworked and outboxed Yordan throughout most of the fight. Coming forward, Crolla was also being hit, but managed to tie Yordan up and land body shots. From rounds 9 through 12, Yordan was the busier fighter, and he was able to land more shots in that part of the fight than he had earlier. Crolla began to tire, but looked to have a good enough lead to take the decision. The three judges scored the fight 116–112, 116-112 and 116-112 for Crolla. Speaking on the fight, Crolla stated it was 'a very mature boxing performance' as he knew it would 'be a very hard 12 rounds.' Crolla said he'd love to fight Lomachenko in Manchester, but he 'wouldn't be disrespectful' to call out Lomachenko.

On 30 November, the WBA confirmed that Crolla would be next in line to fight the winner of Vasiliy Lomachenko's unification fight against José Pedraza on 8 December 2018.

==== Crolla vs. Lomachenko ====
In December 2018, after Lomachenko successfully unified at lightweight, Top Rank president Todd duBoef announced Lomachenko would return to the ring on 12 April 2019 at the Staples Center in Los Angeles headlining Friday night Top Rank Boxing on ESPN. With Richard Commey and Isa Chaniev set to fight for the vacant IBF lightweight title, it was highly likely that the winner would fight Lomachenko in what would be Lomachenko's second unification fight. Top Rank intended to finalize the deal with promoter Lou DiBella, which would see Commey vs. Chaniev take place on 2 February 2019 at the Ford Center in Frisco, Texas. By the end of January 2019, purse bids for Lomachenko vs. Crolla were pushed back two days to 6 February 2019 with the minimum bid being $150,000.

Commey defeated Chaniev to become the new IBF lightweight champion, however picked up a hand injury during the fight. His promoter Lou DiBella advised Top Rank, Commey would be out of training for a minimum of two months. This prompted Top Rank to start searching for a new opponent for Lomachenko. On 20 February it was announced that Lomachenko would defend his WBA (Super), WBO and The Ring titles against Crolla at the Staples Center in Los Angeles, California on 12 April 2019. The bout, including the full undercard would be streamed live and exclusive on ESPN+, to mark the one year anniversary of the streaming service. The fight was made official a week later with ticket information. The bout would mark Crolla's first time fighting in USA, having only fought once previously outside of his native UK. It was reported that Lomachenlo would earn $1.2 million, but guaranteed closer to $3.2 million. Crolla, who was a heavy 100-1 underdog, had an official purse of $300,000 for the fight, however guaranteed more due to UK TV rights. Crolla was ranked #1 by the WBA and #10 by the WBO at lightweight.

In front of 10,101 in attendance, Lomachenko stopped Crolla in the first minute of round 4. The initial two rounds were paced and methodical as Lomachenko visibly started to out-throw Crolla during round 2. In round 3, Lomachenko became overwhelmingly dominant while forcing Crolla to spend a majority of his time against the ropes. With 11 seconds left in the round, Lomachenko's combination was interrupted by referee Jack Reiss. At first glance Lomachenko, and even the crowd, thought it looked as if Reiss had stopped the fight, causing Lomachenko to celebrate by jumping on the corner ropes. However, Reiss immediately corrected the misunderstanding and forced out commissioners who had climbed into the ring, and resumed the fight after a 10-second count for Crolla — although with 1 second left, the round effectively ended immediately. Between rounds 3 and 4, Reiss explained he'd not actually waved off the fight, and instead called a technical knockdown — he was seen immediately pointing and saying "down". He explained he was accounting for the ropes' aid to Crolla's ability to stand, since if the ropes had been absent Crolla would've been down and it is against the rules for a fighter to have any outside support in standing throughout the entire duration of the fight, thus justifying his rarely used but sanctioned technical knockdown. Because of this Crolla continued on into round 4 where after briefly trying to rally back he was knocked down in second 52 by a right hook to the temple. Crolla fell to the canvas face-first, unable to break his fall. After what looked to be a 3 to 4 second count by Reiss, the fight was waved off, giving Lomachenko the win and retaining his sanctioned belts. Crolla was unable to participate in the post-fight interviews, but did not decide to immediately go to hospital. According to CompuBox Stats, Lomachenko landed 72 of 249 shots (29%), and Crolla landed only 12 of his 96 thrown (13%), this included 7 power shots, compared to Lomachenko's 58 power shots. After the fight, Crolla said, "I don't want to go out like that but the end is near." He stated he would regroup with his team, and hope for a farewell bout in Manchester to finish his career.

=== Retirement fight ===
==== Crolla vs. Urquiaga ====
On 18 September 2019, Crolla announced his last fight would take place at the Manchester Arena on 2 November, co-headlining with Katie Taylor who was stepping up to super-lightweight to fight Greece's WBO title-holder Christina Linardatou. Speaking at the press conference, he said, “It’s the last one. If it couldn’t have been Manchester then there wouldn’t have been another one. If you stay in boxing too long, it takes more from you than you take from boxing.” 32 year old Frank Urquiaga (13-1-1, 1KO) was later named as Crolla's final opponent in a 10-round contest, with the fight being contested for the vacant WBA Continental title. Crolla admitted he did not know much about his opponent, but said, “I know that he is capable, he lost on points when he fought for the European title but I believe I should be beating him. That’s what I will do, I will go out on a massive high and enjoy this last dance." Crolla weighed in at 136.75 pounds and, as a result, not eligible for the fringe title being contested. Urquiaga weighed 134 pounds.

Crolla defeated Urquiaga via ten-round majority decision. The scorecards were 98–92, 97-93 and 95–95 in favor of Crolla, which seemed generous. Urquiaga started off on the offensive and seemed to dominate the early rounds. In the first round, he caused a cut above Crolla's left eye and continued to press the attack in the second, delivering right hands. Crolla displayed some progress in the fourth round but still found himself getting hit while moving forward. However, he upped his urgency in the fifth, landing a flurry of effective body shots. Crolla continued to apply pressure in the sixth and seventh rounds, but the final rounds proved to be closely contested.

After the fight, he said, “I definitely thought I had done enough, but I know time is up now. I’ve had a great career and I’ve loved every minute, but I know it is time to go now." He later added, “I tried my best to block it out, but I had a lot of nice messages today and that made me a bit emotional. I done the best I could and enjoyed the ringwalk, enjoyed the fight but I also knew that’s enough now, I’m past it. I don’t want to hang around to be a stepping stone for some of the fighters coming through. It’s great to go out with a win and there is nowhere else I would rather do it than Manchester. I set out in this game with two goals, one was to get a house, to make life a little bit easier for the family; the other was to win a world title. Thankfully I worked hard, Eddie (Hearn) provided me with the chance and I took it and I lived the dream.” After retiring, Crolla made the decision to further his education as a trainer and to operate his own amateur club, Fox ABC.

== Professional boxing record ==
45 fights	35 wins	7 losses
By knockout	13	2
By decision	22	5
Draws	3	

No.	Result	Record	Opponent	Type	Round, time	Date	Location	Notes
45	Win	35–7–3	Frank Urquiaga	MD	10	2 Nov 2019	Manchester Arena, Manchester, England	
44	Loss	34–7–3	Vasiliy Lomachenko	KO	4 (12), 0:58	12 Apr 2019	Staples Center, Los Angeles, California, US	For WBA (Super), WBO, and The Ring lightweight titles
43	Win	34–6–3	Daud Yordan	UD	12	10 Nov 2018	Manchester Arena, Manchester, England	
42	Win	33–6–3	Edson Ramirez	UD	10	31 Mar 2018	Principality Stadium, Cardiff, Wales	
41	Win	32–6–3	Ricky Burns	UD	12	7 Oct 2017	Manchester Arena, Manchester, England	
40	Loss	31–6–3	Jorge Linares	UD	12	25 Mar 2017	Manchester Arena, Manchester, England	For WBA and The Ring lightweight titles
39	Loss	31–5–3	Jorge Linares	UD	12	24 Sep 2016	Manchester Arena, Manchester, England	Lost WBA lightweight title; For vacant The Ring lightweight title
38	Win	31–4–3	Ismael Barroso	KO	7 (12), 1:31	7 May 2016	Manchester Arena, Manchester, England	Retained WBA lightweight title
37	Win	30–4–3	Darleys Pérez	KO	5 (12), 2:30	21 Nov 2015	Manchester Arena, Manchester, England	Won WBA lightweight title
36	Draw	29–4–3	Darleys Pérez	MD	12	18 Jul 2015	Manchester Arena, Manchester, England	For WBA lightweight title
35	Win	29–4–2	Gyorgy Mizsei Jr.	PTS	6	15 Nov 2014	3Arena, Dublin, Ireland	
34	Draw	28–4–2	Gamaliel Díaz	TD	3 (12), 3:00	13 Sep 2014	Phones 4u Arena, Manchester, England	Retained WBO Inter-Continental lightweight title; TD after Díaz cut from accidental head clash
33	Win	28–4–1	John Murray	TKO	10 (12), 2:20	19 Apr 2014	Phones 4u Arena, Manchester, England	Retained WBO Inter-Continental lightweight title
32	Win	27–4–1	Stephen Foster	RTD	6 (12), 3:00	23 Nov 2013	Phones 4u Arena, Manchester, England	Retained WBO Inter-Continental lightweight title
31	Win	26–4–1	Gavin Rees	MD	12	28 Jun 2013	Bolton Arena, Bolton, England	Won vacant WBO Inter-Continental lightweight title
30	Draw	25–4–1	Derry Mathews	SD	12	30 Mar 2013	Echo Arena, Liverpool, England	For vacant Commonwealth lightweight title
29	Win	25–4	Kieran Farrell	UD	10	7 Dec 2012	Bowlers Exhibition Centre, Manchester, England	Won vacant English lightweight title
28	Loss	24–4	Gary Sykes	SD	3	6 Oct 2012	Liverpool Olympia, Liverpool, England	Prizefighter 26: lightweight semi-final
27	Win	24–3	Stephen Jennings	UD	3	6 Oct 2012	Liverpool Olympia, Liverpool, England	Prizefighter 26: lightweight quarter-final
26	Loss	23–3	Derry Mathews	TKO	6 (12), 2:57	21 Apr 2012	Sports Centre, Oldham, England	Lost British lightweight title
25	Win	23–2	Willie Limond	UD	12	25 Nov 2011	Ravenscraig Regional Sports Facility, Motherwell, Scotland	Retained British lightweight title
24	Win	22–2	Juan Montiel	SD	8	17 Sep 2011	MGM Grand Garden Arena, Paradise, Nevada, US	
23	Win	21–2	Herve De Luca	TKO	1 (10), 2:59	18 Jun 2011	Robin Park Arena, Wigan, England	
22	Win	20–2	John Watson	TKO	9 (12), 2:35	12 Feb 2011	Liverpool Olympia, Liverpool, England	Won vacant British lightweight title
21	Win	19–2	Andy Morris	TKO	7 (10), 2:51	2 Oct 2010	De Vere Whites Hotel, Bolton, England	Won vacant English super-featherweight title
20	Win	18–2	Chris Riley	PTS	6	16 Jul 2010	Bolton Arena, Bolton, England	
19	Win	17–2	Sid Razak	PTS	6	16 Jul 2010	Fit City, Broughton, England	
18	Win	16–2	Jason Nesbitt	PTS	4	19 Feb 2010	Fenton Manor Sports Complex, Stoke-on-Trent, England	
17	Win	15–2	Michael Brodie	TKO	3 (8), 3:00	27 Nov 2009	Robin Park Arena, Wigan, England	
16	Win	14–2	John Baguley	PTS	4	25 Sep 2009	Manchester Velodrome, Manchester, England	
15	Loss	13–2	Gary Sykes	PTS	10	29 May 2009	Fenton Manor Sports Complex, Stoke-on-Trent, England	
14	Win	13–1	Carl Allen	PTS	6	14 Mar 2009	MEN Arena, Manchester, England	
13	Win	12–1	John Baguley	PTS	4	12 Dec 2008	Kingsway Leisure Centre, Widnes, England	
12	Win	11–1	Carl Allen	PTS	6	10 Oct 2008	Everton Park Sports Centre, Liverpool, England	
11	Win	10–1	Youssef al-Hamidi	PTS	6	26 Sep 2008	York Hall, London, England	
10	Win	9–1	Robin Deakin	PTS	4	6 Sep 2008	MEN Arena, Manchester, England	
9	Loss	8–1	Youssef al-Hamidi	PTS	8	5 Apr 2008	Bolton Arena, Bolton, England	
8	Win	8–0	Steve Gethin	PTS	6	14 Mar 2008	Old Trafford, Manchester, England	
7	Win	7–0	Tomasz Kwiecien	KO	5 (6), 1:40	19 Jan 2008	Burg-Wächter Castello, Düsseldorf, Germany	
6	Win	6–0	Daniel Thorpe	RTD	2 (6), 3:00	8 Dec 2007	Bolton Arena, Bolton, England	
5	Win	5–0	Johnny Greaves	TKO	3 (6), 1:08	6 Oct 2007	Nottingham Arena, Nottingham, England	
4	Win	4–0	Neil McQuade	TKO	1 (4), 2:15	31 May 2007	Old Trafford, Manchester, England	
3	Win	3–0	Eduards Krauklis	PTS	4	10 Mar 2007	Liverpool Olympia, Liverpool, England	
2	Win	2–0	Ariel Krasnopolski	TKO	3 (4), 1:57	9 Dec 2006	ExCeL, London, England	
1	Win	1–0	Abdul Rashid	PTS	4	14 Oct 2006	MEN Arena, Manchester, England	

Sporting positions
Regional boxing titles
Vacant Title last held by Ryan Barrett	English super-featherweight champion 2 October 2010 – 12 February 2012; Vacated	Vacant Title next held by Ben Jones
Vacant Title last held by Gavin Rees	British lightweight champion 12 February 2011 – 21 April 2012	Succeeded by Derry Mathews
Vacant Title last held by Derry Mathews	English lightweight champion 7 December 2012 – March 2013; Vacated	Vacant Title next held by Kirk Goodings
Vacant Title last held by Carlos Molina	WBO Inter-Continental lightweight champion 29 June 2013 – November 2014; Vacated	Vacant Title next held by Liam Walsh
World boxing titles
Preceded by Darleys Pérez	WBA lightweight champion 21 November 2015 – 24 September 2016	Succeeded by Jorge Linares
