= Scott Lawton (boxer) =

English boxer (born 1976)

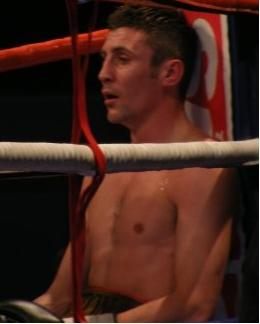

Personal information
- Nationality: British
- Born: Scott Lawton; 23 August 1976 (age 50) Stoke-on-Trent
- Weight: Lightweight

Boxing career
- Stance: Orthodox

Boxing record
- Total fights: 36
- Wins: 27
- Win by KO: 5
- Losses: 8
- Draws: 1

Scott Lawton (born 23 August 1976) is an English former professional boxer who has competed in the lightweight and super featherweight divisions. He comes from Stoke-on-Trent, is a two-time English lightweight champion and has challenged for the full British and Commonwealth lightweight titles as well as the full European super featherweight title.

== Professional career ==
Lawton's professional debut came in September 2001 with a win overs Dave Hinds at the Elephant & Castle Center in Southwark. He fought nine more times (winning 9 and losing 1) before being given the chance to fight for his first professional title in June 2004. The title on the line was the Midlands Area lightweight belt and he claimed the belt with a 10-round points win over experienced journeyman Carl Allen at the Octagon Center in Sheffield. He would defend the belt only once in May 2006 when he beat Baz Carey at the King's Hall in Stoke. Between the Allen and Carey fights he fought eight times, winning six times with one draw and a defeat to Alan Temple.

=== English champion and title challenger ===
Following the victory over Carey, Lawton's next significant fight in June 2006 was for the vacant English title beating Stefy Bull in the 8th round at the Doncaster Dome. Two more wins over journeyman opponents gave the man from Stoke a record of 20-2-1 and set him up for a shot at the full British title in March 2007. The fight against reigning champ Jon Thaxton was a big step up however and Thaxton won in the 7th round. His very next fight was to be a challenge for the Commonwealth title, this time fighting Amir Khan. As before his big night would end in disappointment with Khan scoring a win in the 4th round. The decision to fight Khan meant that Lawton was unable to defend his English championship which had to be vacated.

Lawton rebounded with four straight wins setting himself up for a shot at the new and unbeaten English champion Martin Gethin in December 2008. The fight ended in the 9th round when Gethin suffered a large cut on his head. Lawton was at the time ahead on the scorecards and was awarded the fight to become a two-time English champion at the Trent FM Arena in Nottingham.

On 13 June 2009 Lawton again challenged for the British title, travelling to the Robin Park Arena in Wigan to fight Manchester's John Murray. The fight again ended in disappointment for Lawton as he once again came up short at championship level, the referee stopping the fight in the sixth round ensuring a third championship defeat for Lawton. After the fight Lawton said that the result had made him consider his future in the sport saying "I'm 32 now and you can't keep going on forever. It's something that I've got to think hard about"

=== Move to super featherweight ===
Following the Murray defeat, Lawton took the decision to move down a weight division to super featherweight. His first fight at the weight saw him return to Stoke-on-Trent to fight on the Hatton Promotions card held in the city. His first opponent was a man moving up in weight, the former WBU champion Derry Mathews. Lawton won the fight via stoppage in the sixth round and afterwards claimed it was the "biggest fight of his career". The win paved the way for a crack at the vacant super featherweight European title against former holder French based Armenian Leva Kirakosyan. Kirakosyan, whose last visit to the UK saw him defeat the then British champion Carl Johanneson, held the title in 2007 only to lose it to Belarusian Sergey Gulyakevich. The fight on 19 February 2010 topped the bill of a Hatton Promotions bill in Stoke ended in a third round defeat for Lawton with the Armenian putting him down in the first minute and causing him to have a standing count in the second.

=== Prizefighter ===
On 20 November 2010 Lawton returned to the ring to take part in the Prizefighter tournament which featured boxers from the super featherweight division. Prior to the competition he claimed that a win would "open doorways" and possibly lead to another shot at the British title. The draw for the knock out style tournament gave Lawton a taste of what might happen if he did fight for the British belt once again as he faced the reigning British champion Gary Sykes in the quarter-finals. Sykes however was too good for Scott on the night and ran out a comfortable points winner over the three rounds although ended up losing himself in the semi-finals to eventual winner Gary Buckland.

=== Retirement ===
Lawton challenged previous victim Derry Mathews for the IBO International lightweight title on 22 January 2011, stating prior to the fight that it would be his last. The fight, in Liverpool, resulted in all three judges scoring for Mathews with the fight going the full 12 rounds despite a knock down for Lawton in the sixth. Speaking after the fight Lawton said "I finished off with a good last round ... I was getting to him towards the end of the fight and he didn't want to stand and trade with me ... I kept throwing shots and nothing was coming back. I had him on the ropes and he had to bite on his gum shield to get through it". Announcing his retirement from boxing Lawton said that he would now concentrate on training boxers at the Impact gym saying "I'm going to miss boxing. It's been a massive part of my life – and it's been fun ... But I'm getting on and needed to start thinking of doing something else. I'm going to concentrate on training champions."
