= Peter Buckley (boxer) =

English boxer (born 1969)

Personal information
- Nickname: The Professor
- Nationality: British
- Born: 9 March 1969 (age 57) Birmingham, England, U.K.
- Weight: Featherweight

Boxing career
- Stance: Orthodox

Boxing record
- Total fights: 300
- Wins: 32
- Losses: 256
- Draws: 12
- No contests: 0

Peter Buckley (born 9 March 1969) is a retired English journeyman boxer who competed from 1989 to 2008. Although he most notably fought around the Featherweight division, he competed at a number of weight divisions up and down on either side.

== Pro career ==
Buckley turned pro in October 1989, when he fought Alan Baldwin from Brixham at the Colosseum, Stafford, West Midlands, England, it was a close fight which ended in a draw.

Buckley lost 256 of his 300 contests, which is the second most in boxing history behind Reggie Strickland. Throughout his career he fought a number of quality world champions and British champions including Duke McKenzie, Naseem Hamed, Acelino Freitas, Jason Cook, Paul Ingle, Patrick Mullings, Dean Pithie, Jason Booth, Michael Brodie, Scott Harrison, Michael Gomez, Johnny Bredahl, Gavin Rees, John Murray, Bradley Pryce, Derry Mathews, Lee Meager, Dave Stewart, Gary Woolcombe, Lee Selby and Kell Brook.

Buckley, who never fought for a major title, was honoured with a special ringwalk and presentation before his 200th fight in April 2003 at the MEN Arena in Manchester. He then proceeded to lose a decision to Baz Carey.

Buckley finished his professional career with his 300th and last fight on 31 October 2008 where he scored a 4-round points decision victory over Matin Mohammed (0–1–1) in Birmingham. After the fight, Peter was awarded a small trophy and a special belt to mark his achievement.

Peter had won a few regional titles, the vacant BBBofC Midlands area Super featherweight and Super Bantamweight titles when his record was at 16–9–4 (2KO) against Mark Bates (super featherweight) and 20–44–5 (5KO) respectively. Perhaps his career peak was at 17–10–4 (3KO) before losing to future CBC, and EBU champion and WBU challenger Johnny Armour.

== See also ==
- Angel Robinson Garcia

Preceded by Hugh Forde	BBBofC Midlands Area Super Featherweight Champion; 5 June 1991 – 6 October 1997; Vacated	Vacant Title next held by Ervine Blake
Preceded by Matthew Harris	BBBofC Midlands Area Super Bantamweight Champion; 10 February 1995 – 25 October 1995	Succeeded by Matthew Harris
