= Kieran Farrell =

English boxer

Personal information
- Nickname: Vicious
- Nationality: British
- Born: 27 June 1990 (age 36) Heywood, Greater Manchester, UK
- Weight: Lightweight; Super featherweight

Boxing career
- Stance: Orthodox

Boxing record
- Total fights: 15
- Wins: 14
- Win by KO: 3
- Losses: 1

Kieran Farrell (born 27 June 1990) is a British former professional boxer who fought at lightweight.

He was trained by Bobby Rimmer in Manchester for his first eleven professional fights, winning eight on points and two by knockout. He then teamed up with Irish trainer John Breen where he engaged in another four paid contests including a lightweight Central Area title bout where he defeated previously unbeaten Joe Elfidh (7–0) by way of knockout in the fifth round.

Farrell was managed by Steve Wood for the first two years of his career by switched to Ricky Hatton's Hatton Promotions in the summer of 2011. After a short spell with Hatton Promotions, Kieran joined up with promoter Dave Coldwell at Coldwell Promotions.

Farrell was forced to retire from boxing in January 2013 after suffering brain damage during his fight with Anthony Crolla. Farrell was awarded a BEM British empire medal by her majesty in the Queen's 90th birthday honours 2016.

Kieran Farrell BEM is now a BBBofC Professional Promotor, Manager and Trainer.

Farrel serviced as Daniel Dubois' assistant trainer between March 2024 to August 2025.
