= Vasiliy Lomachenko vs. Anthony Crolla =

Boxing match

- Date: 12 April 2019
- Venue: Staples Center, Los Angeles, California, U.S.
- Title(s) on the line: WBA, WBO and The Ring lightweight titles

Tale of the tape
Boxer	Vasiliy Lomachenko	Anthony Crolla
Nickname	"Loma"	"Million Dolla"
Hometown	Bilhorod-Dnistrovskyi, Odesa Oblast, Ukraine	Manchester, England, UK
Purse	$1,200,000	$300,000
Pre-fight record	12–1 (9 KO)	34–6–3 (13 KO)
Age	31 years, 1 month	32 years, 4 months
Height	5 ft 7 in (170 cm)	5 ft 7 in (170 cm)
Weight	134 1/2 lb (61 kg)	134 3/4 lb (61 kg)
Style	Southpaw	Orthodox
Recognition	WBA, WBO and The Ring; Lightweight Champion; TBRB; No. 1 Ranked Lightweight; The Ring No. 1 ranked pound-for-pound fighter 3-division world champion	WBA; No. 1 Ranked Lightweight; WBO; No. 10 Ranked Lightweight; The Ring; No. 4 Ranked Lightweight; TBRB; No. 7 Ranked Lightweight; Former Lightweight Champion

Result
- Lomachenko defeats Crolla by 4th round KO

Vasiliy Lomachenko vs. Anthony Crolla was a professional boxing match contested 12 April 2019, for the WBA, WBO and The Ring Lightweight championship.

== Background ==
On 12 December 2018 Top Rank president Todd duBoef announced that unified WBA, WBO and The Ring lightweight Vasiliy Lomachenko would return to the ring on 12 April 2019 at the Staples Center in Los Angeles, headlining a Friday night Top Rank Boxing card on ESPN. With Richard Commey and Isa Chaniev set to fight for the vacant IBF lightweight title, it was considered highly likely that the winner would fight Lomachenko in what would be Lomachenko's second unification fight. Top Rank intended to finalize the deal with promoter Lou DiBella, which would see Commey vs. Chaniev take place on 2 February at the Ford Center in Frisco, Texas. By the end of January, purse bids for Lomachenko vs. Anthony Crolla were pushed back two days to 6 February 2019 with the minimum bid being $150,000. Commey defeated Chaniev to become the new IBF lightweight champion, however picked up a hand injury during the fight. His promoter Lou DiBella advised Top Rank, Commey would be out of training for a minimum of two months. This prompted Top Rank to start searching for a new opponent for Lomachenko. On 20 February, it was announced that Lomachenko would defend his WBA (Super), WBO and The Ring titles against Crolla at the Staples Center in Los Angeles on 12 April.

The bout, including the full undercard would be streamed live and exclusive on ESPN+, to mark the one year anniversary of the streaming service. The bout would mark Crolla's first time fighting in the US, having only fought once previously outside of his native UK. It was reported that Lomachenko would earn $1.2 million, but guaranteed closer to $3.2 million.

Crolla, who was a heavy 20–1 underdog, had an official purse of $300,000 for the fight, however guaranteed more due to UK TV rights.

== The fight ==
Lomachenko visibly started to out-throw Crolla in the 2nd round, before becoming dominant in the 3rd, forcing Crolla to spend a majority of his time against the ropes. With 11 seconds left in the round, Lomachenko's combination was interrupted by referee Jack Reiss. At first glance, Lomachenko, and even the crowd, thought it looked as if Reiss had stopped the fight, causing Lomachenko to celebrate by jumping on the corner ropes. However, Reiss immediately corrected the misunderstanding and forced out commissioners who had climbed into the ring, and resumed the fight after a 10-second count for Crolla — although with 1 second left, the round effectively ended immediately. Between rounds 3 and 4, Reiss explained he'd not actually waved off the fight, and instead called a technical knockdown — he was seen immediately pointing and saying "down". He explained he was accounting for the ropes' aid to Crolla's ability to stand, since if the ropes had been absent Crolla would've been down and it is against the rules for a fighter to have any outside support in standing throughout the entire duration of the fight, thus justifying this rarely used but sanctioned technical knockdown.

Crolla continued into round 4 where after briefly trying to rally back he was knocked down again by a right hook to the temple. Crolla fell to the canvas face-first, unable to break his fall. After what looked to be a 3 to 4 second count by Reiss, the fight was waved off, giving Lomachenko the win and retaining his titles.

According to CompuBox, Lomachenko landed 72 of 249 shots (28.9%), and Crolla landed only 12 of his 96 thrown (12.5%).

== Aftermath ==
Crolla was unable to participate in the post-fight interviews, but did not decide to immediately go to hospital.

In the post-fight press conference, Lomachenko said he thought it was a clear waving of the fight by Reiss, who had his back to Lomachenko and entered the exchange in a manner intent on protecting Crolla.

Following his win Lomachenko was linked to both Commey and WBC No. 1 contender Luke Campbell.

== Undercard ==
Confirmed bouts:

Winner	Loser	Weight division/title belt(s) disputed	Result
(Mexico) Gilberto Ramírez	(United States) Tommy Karpency	Light heavyweight (12 rounds)	4th round RTD
(United States) Arnold Barboza Jr.	(United States) Mike Alvarado	NABF Junior Super Lightweight title	3rd round KO
(Kazakhstan) Janibek Alimkhanuly	(Mexico) Cristian Olivas	vacant WBC Continental Americas and WBO Global middleweight titles	Unanimous decision
(United States) José Rubén Rodríguez	(United States) Ramel Sneger	Welterweight (6 rounds)	Majority decision
(Italy) Guido Vianello	(United States) Lawrence Gabriel	Heavyweight (6 rounds)	1st round KO
(Russia) Alexander Besputin	(Argentina) Alfredo Rodolfo Blanco	Welterweight (10 rounds)	Unanimous decision
Preliminary bouts
(United States) Christopher Zavala	(United States) Sergio Antonio Gonzalez	Super Featherweight (4 rounds)	Unanimous decision
(Dominican Republic) Elvis Rodriguez	(United States) Kevin Alfonso Luna	Light Welterweight (4 rounds)	2nd round KO

== Broadcasting ==
Country	Broadcaster
Panama	RPC Channel 4
Ukraine	Inter
United Kingdom	Sky Sports
United States	ESPN+

Preceded by vs. José Pedraza	Vasiliy Lomachenko's bouts 12 April 2019	Succeeded by vs. Luke Campbell
Preceded by vs. Daud Yordan	Anthony Crolla's bouts 12 April 2019	Succeeded by vs. Frank Urquiaga
