= List of British lightweight boxing champions =

List of British lightweight boxing champions is a table showing the boxers who have won the British lightweight title. The title had been sanctioned by the National Sporting Club from 1909–1929 where they awarded the Lord Lonsdale Challenge Belt until its later replacement by the British Boxing Board of Control (BBBoC) since.

A champion may retire or voluntarily relinquish the title in order to fight for a higher-ranked championship. Where the date on which a champion relinquished the title is unclear, the date of the last BBBoC sanctioned fight is shown.

^{r}–Champion relinquished title.

^{s}–Champion stripped of title.

Name	Duration of reign	Defences
(England) Jack Goldswain	23 April 1908 – 23 November 1908	2
(Wales) Freddie Welsh	8 November 1909 – 27 February 1911	1
(England) Matt Wells	27 February 1911 – 11 November 1912	1
(Wales) Freddie Welsh	11 November 1912 – 16 December 1912^{r}	1
(England) Bob Marriott	23 June 1919^{r}	0
(England) Ernie Rice	11 April 1921 – 18 September 1922	2
(Scotland) Seaman Nobby Hall	18 September 1922 – 17 May 1923	0
(England) Harry Mason	17 May 1923 – 21 November 1923^{r}	1
(England) Ernie Izzard	24 November 1924 – 22 June 1925	2
(England) Harry Mason	22 June 1925 – 11 February 1926^{r}	1
(England) Sam Steward	17 September 1928 – 2 May 1929	1
(England) Fred Webster	2 May 1929 – 21 May 1930	1
(England) Al Foreman	21 May 1930 – 15 March 1932^{r}	2
(England) Johnny Cuthbert	11 August 1932 – 18 January 1934	1
(England) Harry Mizler	18 January 1934 – 29 October 1934	2
(England) Jack Kid Berg	29 October 1934 – 24 April 1936	1
(England) Jimmy Walsh	24 April 1936 – 23 June 1938	2
(England) Dave Crowley	23 June 1938 – 15 December 1938	1
(England) Eric Boon	15 December 1938 – 12 August 1944	3
(Wales) Ronnie James	12 August 1944 – 6 June 1947^{r}	0
(England) Billy Thompson	16 October 1947 – 28 August 1951	3
(England) Tommy McGovern	28 August 1951 – 25 July 1952	1
(England) Frank Johnson	25 July 1952^{r}	0
(England) Joe Lucy	29 September 1953 – 26 April 1955	1
(England) Frank Johnson	26 April 1955 – 13 April 1956	1
(England) Joe Lucy	13 April 1956 – 9 April 1957	2
(England) Dave Charnley	9 April 1957 – January 1965^{r}	2
(England) Maurice Cullen	8 April 1965 – 19 February 1968	4
(Scotland) Ken Buchanan	19 February 1968 – 12 May 1970^{r}	1
(Scotland) Willie Reilly	1 February 1972^{r}	0
(Scotland) Jim Watt	3 May 1972 – 29 January 1973	1
(Scotland) Ken Buchanan	29 January 1973 – September 1974^{r}	0
(Scotland) Jim Watt	27 January 1975 – 21 February 1977^{r}	1
(Republic of Ireland) Charlie Nash	28 February 1979 – July 1979^{r}	0
(England) Ray Cattouse	24 March 1980 – 12 October 1982	2
(England) George Feeney	12 October 1982 – 10 February 1984^{r}	2
(England) Tony Willis	16 May 1985 – 24 September 1987	3
(Scotland) Alex Dickson	24 September 1987 – 24 February 1988	1
(Scotland) Steve Boyle	24 February 1988 – 1 November 1988^{r}	1
(England) Carl Crook	14 November 1990 – 28 October 1992	5
(England) Billy Schwer	28 October 1992 – 24 February 1993	1
(England) Paul Burke	24 February 1993 – 10 November 1993	1
(England) Billy Schwer	10 November 1993 – 16 February 1994^{r}	1
(England) Michael Ayers	17 February 1995 – August 1997^{r}	4
(England) Wayne Rigby	10 January 1998 – 17 October 1998	2
(England) Bobby Vanzie	17 October 1998 – 17 July 2003	5
(England) Graham Earl	17 July 2003 – 19 June 2005^{r}	3
(England) Lee Meager	12 May 2006 – 8 December 2006	1
(England) Jonathan Thaxton	8 December 2006 – 5 October 2007^{r}	2
(England) John Murray	11 July 2008 – 7 May 2010^{r}	4
(Wales) Gavin Rees	6 November 2010^{r}	0
(England) Anthony Crolla	12 February 2011 – 21 April 2012	2
(England) Derry Mathews	21 April 2012 – 7 July 2012	1
(Wales) Gavin Rees	7 July 2012^{r}	0
(England) Martin Gethin	18 January 2013 – 10 May 2014	1
(England) Derry Mathews	10 May 2014^{r}	0
(England) Terry Flanagan	26 July 2014^{r}	0
(England) Scott Cardle	30 May 2015 – 15 April 2017	2
(England) Robbie Barrett	15 April 2017 – 7 October 2017	0
(England) Lewis Ritson	7 October 2017 – 16 June 2018^{r}	3
(Wales) Joe Cordina	20 April 2019 – February 2020^{r}	1
(Northern Ireland) James Tennyson	1 August 2020^{r}	0
(England) Maxi Hughes	19 March 2021^{r}	0
(Wales) Gavin Gwynne	15 April 2022^{r}	2
(England) Sam Noakes	10 February 2024^{r}	1
(England) Louie O'Doherty	4 October 2025 – present	0

== See also ==
- List of British heavyweight boxing champions
- List of British cruiserweight boxing champions
- List of British light-heavyweight boxing champions
- List of British super-middleweight boxing champions
- List of British middleweight boxing champions
- List of British light-middleweight boxing champions
- List of British welterweight boxing champions
- List of British light-welterweight boxing champions
- List of British super-featherweight boxing champions
- List of British featherweight boxing champions
- List of British super-bantamweight boxing champions
- List of British bantamweight boxing champions
- List of British super-flyweight boxing champions
- List of British flyweight boxing champions
- List of British world boxing champions

== Sources ==
- boxrec
- Ken Buchanan - Lightweight Champion of the World - Ken Buchanan site with detailed bio, statistics, full fights and more
- Maurice Golesworthy, Encyclopaedia of Boxing (Eighth Edition) (1988), Robert Hale Limited, ISBN 0-7090-3323-0
