= Darleys Pérez =

Colombian boxer (born 1983)

Personal information
- Born: Darleys Gregorio Pérez Ballesta; September 14, 1983 (age 42) San Pedro de Urabá, Colombia
- Height: 5 ft 7 in (170 cm)
- Weight: Lightweight; Light welterweight

Boxing career
- Reach: 70 in (178 cm)
- Stance: Orthodox

Boxing record
- Total fights: 43
- Wins: 34
- Win by KO: 22
- Losses: 7
- Draws: 2
Medal record
Men's Boxing
Representing Colombia
South American Games
| Gold medal – first place | 2006 Buenos Aires | Lightweight |

Darleys Gregorio Pérez Ballesta (born September 14, 1983) is a Colombian professional boxer who held the WBA lightweight title in 2015. As an amateur he represented Colombia at the 2008 Summer Olympics as a lightweight.

== Amateur career ==
At the South American Games 2006 he won the gold medal vs Éverton Lopes (13:11). At the PanAm Games 2007 he lost at a qualifier (13:16) and the quarterfinals of the main event to world champion Yordenis Ugás (4:8) in a tight contest.

At the 2007 World Amateur Boxing Championships he upset heavy favourite Olexandr Klyuchko (13:10) and knocked out two successive opponents but lost to Kim Song Guk from North Korea {6:23} in the final. He clinched a berth at the Beijing Olympics in 2008, narrowly losing to eventual gold medallist Aleksei Tishchenko at the quarter-finals stage. He turned professional in 2009 following his Olympic campaign, with an impressive amateur record of 82 wins and 7 losses.

== Professional career ==
Darleys Pérez turned professional in 2009, where he competes in the lightweight division. Following a string of knockout victories over domestic Colombian fighters, Pérez debuted in America where he defeated a number of lightweight contenders to earn a shot at the WBA Interim Lightweight title against former super-featherweight champion Yuriorkis Gamboa, also undefeated. In an uninspired yet close contest, Gamboa edged the Colombian over the distance to hand Pérez his first loss in 28 fights. However, Pérez fought for the WBA Interim Lightweight title once again two fights later and won the belt with a decisive points victory over Argenis Lopez, before being promoted to WBA Lightweight champion due to Richar Abril being stripped of his title in 2015. Pérez' first defence of the WBA belt came against tough underdog Anthony Crolla in Manchester, where Crolla sought to win the world title following a life-threatening injury sustained in an incursion with burglars the previous Christmas. In a competitive yet controversial bout, many thought Crolla had done enough to secure a decision victory but Pérez was fortunate to come away from Manchester with a draw on the cards. A rematch subsequently followed in Manchester, during which Crolla upset Pérez by knocking him out with a crisp body punch in the 5th round, taking the Colombian's WBA belt in the process. Pérez followed up the second loss of his career with a knockout win over domestic rival Ubadel Soto in Colombia to take his record to 33 wins, 2 losses and 1 draw.

== Professional boxing record ==
| 43 fights | 34 wins | 7 losses |
|---|---|---|
| By knockout | 22 | 5 |
| By decision | 12 | 2 |
| Draws | 2 | |

| No. | Result | Record | Opponent | Type | Round, time | Date | Location | Notes |
|---|---|---|---|---|---|---|---|---|
| 43 | Loss | 34–7–2 | Juan Narvaez | RTD | 8 (10) | Feb 17, 2024 | Club La Pradera, Carmen de Apicala, Colombia | |
| 42 | Loss | 34–6–2 | Brayan Santander | UD | 8 | Jan 20, 2024 | Restaurante Bar Don Juan, Carmen de Apicala, Colombia | |
| 41 | Loss | 34–5–2 | Shakhram Giyasov | KO | 1 (10), 0:41 | Aug 24, 2019 | Centro de Usos Multiples, Hermosillo, Mexico | |
| 40 | Win | 34–4–2 | Felipe Lares | KO | 7 (8), 1:02 | Nov 22, 2018 | Hilton Hotel, Cartagena, Colombia | |
| 39 | Loss | 33–4–2 | Maxim Dadashev | TKO | 10 (10), 1:49 | Jun 9, 2018 | MGM Grand Garden Arena, Paradise, Nevada, U.S. | |
| 38 | Loss | 33–3–2 | Luke Campbell | TKO | 9 (12), 1:28 | Apr 29, 2017 | Wembley Stadium, London, England, U.K. | |
| 37 | Draw | 33–2–2 | Maurice Hooker | SD | 10 | Nov 19, 2016 | T-Mobile Arena, Paradise, Nevada, U.S. | For NABO light welterweight title |
| 36 | Win | 33–2–1 | Ubadel Soto | KO | 2 (8) | May 20, 2016 | Coliseo Municipal, Caucasia, Colombia | |
| 35 | Loss | 32–2–1 | Anthony Crolla | KO | 5 (12), 2:30 | Nov 21, 2015 | Manchester Arena, Manchester, England, U.K. | Lost WBA lightweight title |
| 34 | Draw | 32–1–1 | Anthony Crolla | MD | 12 | Jul 18, 2015 | Manchester Arena, Manchester, England, U.K. | Retained WBA lightweight title |
| 33 | Win | 32–1 | Jonathan Maicelo | UD | 12 | Jan 9, 2015 | Chumash Casino Resort, Santa Ynez, California, U.S. | Retained WBA interim lightweight title |
| 32 | Win | 31–1 | Jaider Parra | KO | 6 (12), 1:29 | Oct 24, 2014 | Coliseo Universidad del Norte, Barranquilla, Colombia | Retained WBA interim lightweight title |
| 31 | Win | 30–1 | Argenis Lopez | UD | 12 | Jun 28, 2014 | Sheraton Hotel, Santo Domingo, Dominican Republic | Won vacant WBA interim lightweight title |
| 30 | Win | 29–1 | Dunis Linan | UD | 8 | Dec 6, 2013 | Coliseo Elias Chegwin, Barranquilla, Colombia | |
| 29 | Loss | 28–1 | Yuriorkis Gamboa | UD | 12 | Jun 8, 2013 | Bell Centre, Montreal, Quebec, Canada | For vacant WBA interim lightweight title |
| 28 | Win | 28–0 | Julio Camano | UD | 8 | Mar 9, 2013 | Coliseo Mario de León, Cerete, Colombia | |
| 27 | Win | 27–0 | Kelly Figueroa | UD | 8 | Nov 30, 2012 | Hotel Prado Mar, Puerto Colombia, Colombia | |
| 26 | Win | 26–0 | Bahodir Mamadjonov | SD | 10 | Aug 10, 2012 | Morongo Casino Resort & Spa, Cabazon, California, U.S. | |
| 25 | Win | 25–0 | Alain Hernandez | KO | 2 (8), 2:59 | Apr 6, 2012 | DoubleTree Hotel, Ontario, California, U.S. | |
| 24 | Win | 24–0 | Fernando Trejo | UD | 8 | Dec 2, 2011 | Chumash Casino Resort, Santa Ynez, California, U.S. | |
| 23 | Win | 23–0 | Oscar Meza | RTD | 6 (10), 3:00 | Sep 30, 2011 | Chumash Casino Resort, Santa Ynez, California, U.S. | |
| 22 | Win | 22–0 | Baudel Cardenas | KO | 1 (6), 1:08 | Jul 22, 2011 | DoubleTree Hotel, Ontario, California, U.S. | |
| 21 | Win | 21–0 | Wilson Alcorro | TKO | 7 (10), 1:33 | Jun 24, 2011 | Coliseo Elias Chegwin, Barranquilla, Colombia | |
| 20 | Win | 20–0 | Jose Reyes | UD | 8 | Apr 29, 2011 | Civic Center, Kissimmee, Florida, U.S. | |
| 19 | Win | 19–0 | Alejandro Heredia | UD | 10 | Feb 5, 2011 | Coliseo Bernardo Caraballo, Cartagena, Colombia | |
| 18 | Win | 18–0 | Ramesis Gil | TKO | 4 (8), 2:14 | Dec 10, 2010 | Civic Center, Kissimmee, Florida, U.S. | |
| 17 | Win | 17–0 | Ernesto Vasquez Batioja | TKO | 1 (10), 2:38 | Oct 30, 2010 | Centro de Convenciones, Cartagena, Colombia | |
| 16 | Win | 16–0 | Edixon Garcia | UD | 10 | Oct 1, 2010 | Coliseo Municipal, Puerto Colombia, Colombia | |
| 15 | Win | 15–0 | Erwin Romero | KO | 2 (8), 1:37 | Jun 25, 2010 | Estadio de Softbol, Puerto Colombia, Colombia | |
| 14 | Win | 14–0 | Pascual Salgado | TKO | 5 (8) | Mar 5, 2010 | Estadio de Softbol, Puerto Colombia, Colombia | |
| 13 | Win | 13–0 | Edinson Teheran | UD | 8 | Feb 12, 2010 | Campito de Bocagrande, Cartagena, Colombia | |
| 12 | Win | 12–0 | Edwin Ortiz | KO | 1 (8), 1:06 | Dec 17, 2009 | Coliseo Bernardo Caraballo, Cartagena, Colombia | |
| 11 | Win | 11–0 | Patricio Antonio Pedrero | TKO | 1 (11), 1:55 | Nov 19, 2009 | La Macarena, Medellin, Colombia | Won vacant WBA Fedelatin lightweight title |
| 10 | Win | 10–0 | Jose Miranda | TKO | 2 (8), 1:38 | Oct 23, 2009 | Hotel Pradomar, Barranquilla, Colombia | |
| 9 | Win | 9–0 | Evaristo Tordecilla | TKO | 1 (8), 1:58 | Sep 12, 2009 | San Pedro de Uraba, Colombia | |
| 8 | Win | 8–0 | Reynaldo Esquivia | TKO | 1 (8), 1:33 | Aug 21, 2009 | Centro Recreacional Las Vegas, Barranquilla, Colombia | |
| 7 | Win | 7–0 | Dunis Linan | UD | 6 | Jun 20, 2009 | Universidad del Norte, Barranquilla, Colombia | |
| 6 | Win | 6–0 | Samir Torres | TKO | 4 (8), 1:04 | May 29, 2009 | Centro Recreacional Las Vegas, Barranquilla, Colombia | |
| 5 | Win | 5–0 | Devinson Guerra | TKO | 4 (8), 1:40 | May 15, 2009 | Hotel Prado Mar, Puerto Colombia, Colombia | |
| 4 | Win | 4–0 | Luis Diaz | KO | 1 (6), 2:54 | Apr 3, 2009 | Centro Recreacional Las Vegas, Barranquilla, Colombia | |
| 3 | Win | 3–0 | Daniel Mercado | KO | 2 (4), 2:45 | Mar 20, 2009 | Centro Recreacional Las Vegas, Barranquilla, Colombia | |
| 2 | Win | 2–0 | Miguel Pacheco | KO | 2 (4) | Mar 6, 2009 | Centro Recreacional Las Vegas, Barranquilla, Colombia | |
| 1 | Win | 1–0 | Edwin Ortiz | KO | 2 (4), 2:17 | Feb 14, 2009 | Puerto Colombia, Colombia | |

== See also ==
- List of world lightweight boxing champions

Sporting positions
Regional boxing titles
| Vacant Title last held by Oscar Jesus Pereyra | WBA Fedelatin lightweight Champion; November 19, 2009 – 2010; Vacated | Vacant Title next held by Richar Abril |
World boxing titles
| Vacant Title last held by Yuriorkis Gamboa | WBA lightweight champion Interim title June 28, 2014 – April 10, 2015; Promoted | Vacant Title next held by Derry Mathews |
| Preceded by Richar Abril; Status changed | WBA lightweight champion April 10, 2015 – November 21, 2015 | Succeeded by Anthony Crolla |
