= Michael Muya =

Kenyan boxer

Michael Muiya
Personal information
- Nickname: Lonzi (alias)
- Nationality: Kenyan
- Born: 1 January 1975 (age 51) Nairobi, Kenya
- Weight: light/light welter/welterweight

Boxing career
- Stance: Orthodox

Boxing record
- Total fights: 22
- Wins: 13 (KO 3)
- Losses: 9 (KO 2)
- Draws: 0

Michael Muiya (born 1 January 1975 in Nairobi) is a Kenyan professional light/light welter/welterweight boxer of the 1990s and 2000s who won the Kenya welterweight title, and Commonwealth lightweight title, and was a challenger for the Kenya light welterweight title against Kevin Onyango, his professional fighting weight varied from 133 3/4 lb (60.7 kg; 9 st 7.8 lb), i.e. lightweight to 140 lb (64 kg; 10 st 0 lb), i.e. light welterweight.
