= Yuri Romanov (boxer) =

Belarusian boxer (born 1982)

Personal information
- Nationality: (Belarus) Belarusian
- Born: 24 July 1982 (age 44) Minsk, Byelorussian SSR, Soviet Union
- Weight: Lightweight

Boxing career
- Stance: Orthodox

Boxing record
- Total fights: 26
- Wins: 23
- Win by KO: 14
- Losses: 3
- Draws: 0
- No contests: 0

Yuri Romanov (born 24 July 1982) is a Belarusian professional boxer who fights in the lightweight division.

== Professional career ==
=== Debut fight ===
Romanov's first fight as a professional boxer was in April 2002, in Maladzyechna, Belarus, when he beat fellow debutant Anton Serov with a seventh round knockout.

=== First title fight ===
After only two fights, Romanov fought Polish boxer Krzysztof Bienias in Wrocław, Poland for the IBF Youth Light Welterweight Title. Romanov lost a close ten round points decision.
