= John Watson (boxer) =

British lightweight boxer (born 1983)

John Watson Jnr
Personal information
- Nationality: (United Kingdom) British
- Born: John Watson; 9 June 1983 (age 43) England
- Height: 5 ft 10 in (1.78 m)
- Weight: Lightweight

Boxing career
- Stance: Orthodox

Boxing record
- Total fights: 18
- Wins: 14
- Win by KO: 6
- Losses: 4
- Draws: 0
- No contests: 0

John Watson (born 9 June 1983) is a British lightweight boxer, based in Liverpool, Merseyside, United Kingdom. He has fought for the British lightweight title on two occasions, losing to Gavin Rees and Anthony Crolla.

== Boxing career ==
=== Amateur career ===
On 28 April 2002 Watson was crowned Junior ABA champion after opponent Jimmy Fletcher pulled out of the final with an injury. The pinnacle of Watson's amateur career was winning the 2004 senior Amateur Boxing Association championships at light welterweight Watson was involved with the 2004 Olympics being Amir Khan's chief training and sparring partner. The same year saw Watson pick up bronze boxing for England in a multinations tournament, held in Lithuania.

=== Professional career ===
Watson turned professional on 10 March 2007, scoring a points victory against Jason Nesbitt. Watson scored another points victory in his second bout against Johnny Greaves on 11 August 2007. In his final fight of 2007 Watson defeated Ade Adebolo by TKO. Watson returned to the ring in February 2008 against Darren Broomhall, victory coming via a KO in the first round. The following month Watson chalked another win against Baz Carey. After his first seven wins Watson signed a three-year contract with David Haye's Hayemaker Promotions. He finished the year Boxing at London's O2 Arena against Silence Saheed on the Undercard of David Haye's Heavyweight Debut against Monte Barrett.

On 28 March 2009, Watson fought against former BBBofC English lightweight title holder Martin Gethin in an eliminator for the BBBofC Lightweight Title. Watson won the fight in what turned out to be a narrow points victory. His final fight of 2009 was against Syrian boxer Youssef Al Hamidi which Watson won on points. Watson then signed with Frank Maloney's FTM Promotions after the demise of Setanta Sports.

==== British title challenges ====
Watson's first fight of 2010 resulted in a points win against Ben Murphy on 19 March and a fifth round stoppage win against Ben Lawler on 4 June. On 6 November 2010 Watson met former WBA world champion Gavin Rees for the full British lightweight title, losing for the first time in his career in the 11th round. He fought once more for the title in his next fight after Rees vacated through illness, with Anthony Crolla stepping in to fight for the now vacant title. Crolla, stepping up to lightweight for the first time inflicted a second career defeat on Watson, winning in the 9th round.
