= Nadeem Siddique =

British-Pakistani boxer (born 1977)

Nadeem 'Sid' Siddique
Personal information
- Nickname: "Golden Boy"
- Nationality: British
- Born: Nadeem Siddique Bradford, Yorkshire, England
- Height: 173 cm (5 ft 8 in)
- Weight: welterweight

Boxing career
- Stance: Orthodox

Boxing record
- Total fights: 27
- Wins: 25
- Win by KO: 9
- Losses: 2
- Draws: 0

Nadeem Siddique (born 28 October 1977) is a British professional boxer.

== Personal life ==
Siddique was born on 28 October 1977 to British Pakistani parents in Bradford, Yorkshire, United Kingdom. He supports his local football team Bradford City and his favorite boxer is Sugar Ray Robinson.

== Amateur career ==
As an amateur Siddique was a 5-time Yorkshire Champion, 2x English Champion, England Schoolboy Captain and National Schoolboy Champion.

== Professional career ==
He made his boxing debut in 2002, and competed at both light-welterweight, and welterweight where he went on to win the BBBofC Central Area welterweight title by way of 4th-round TKO. He was also British Masters Champion.

Siddique prepared for a fight against undefeated Julius Odion, however the fight was cancelled. His first loss came on his 22nd fight at the hands of then undefeated champion Martin Gethin. He came back to fight after a year off boxing for his 23rd fight against Tom Glover, an opponent he had previously defeated. Siddique was disqualified due to continuous low-blows and subsequently put boxing on hold due to a back injury.

Siddique has said he has intentions of returning to boxing, stating; '...I've a lot to prove...I'll be back. I had a horrible back injury so it has been a nightmare... I'm still training, I'm nowhere near done...'

Siddique is now on the comeback trail with 3 fights and 3 wins and is on the verge of a major championship fight.

== Championships held ==
- Central Area welterweight champion
- British Masters champion

== Life outside boxing ==
Siddique is the founder of 'Make the Weight' gym; the opening of the gym was attended by boxer Mike Tyson in whose honor Siddique staged a 3-hour-long dinner-show with many A-list celebrities also in attendance. The event was dedicated to Qasim Rahman, a Tyson fan who had died just as the two prepared to meet.

In 2009, Siddique along with Junior Witter organized a charity event where they washed cars to help raise money for the victims of Gaza; Siddique had hosted a similar event in 2005 for the people of Palestine and Gaza whereby he raised £52,000. He stated 'Me and Junior have been doing loads of things for charities and with our popularity in Bradford we always raise quite a few quid...'. The boxers later took part in a charity run to help raise funds for the same cause.
