= Martin Gethin =

British former professional boxer (born 1983)

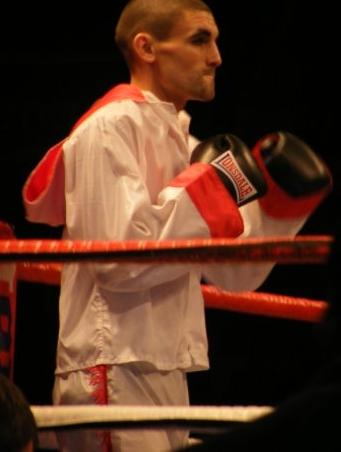
- Gethin in 2009

Personal information
- Nickname: The Quiet Man
- Nationality: British
- Born: 16 November 1983 (age 42) Walsall, West Midlands, UK
- Height: 5 ft 6 in (168 cm)
- Weight: Lightweight; Light welterweight

Boxing career
- Stance: Orthodox

Boxing record
- Total fights: 38
- Wins: 28
- Win by KO: 12
- Losses: 9
- Draws: 1

Martin Gethin (born 16 November 1983) is a British former professional boxer who competed from 2004 to 2017. He held the British lightweight title from 2013 to 2014.

== Early professional career ==
Gethin made his debut in November 2004 beating journeyman Kristian Laight stopping him in the 4th round. In his 10th fight he fought for the vacant Midlands Area lightweight title beating Craig Johnson on points over 10 rounds. He received an opportunity just two fights later to fight in Las Vegas at the MGM Grand. He beat Fabian Luque, who had a record of 21-5, and stopped him in the 4th round in what was his best win to date. On returning to the UK, Gethin trod water beating Carl Allen and Ali Wyatt until the opportunity arose for him to fight the unbeaten Nadeem Siddique. He won the fight in a potential fight of the year and set himself up for a shot at the English title.

== English champion and challenger ==
In September 2008 Gethin fought touted prospect John Fewkes for the vacant English lightweight title and forced the referee to wave it off in the 4th round. Fewkes came into the contest with a 17-0 record and with wins over Scott Haywood and Craig Watson on his record but had only fought once in the year and was also having problems making the weight. As it transpired he failed to make the weight for the contest meaning that even if he won he would not have lifted the title. Gethin took full advantage and dominated from the 3rd round securing a big upset win. Gethin's first defence ended in disappointment however when he was defeated by Stoke's Scott Lawton at Nottingham's Trent FM Arena on 6 December 2008. In March 2009 Gethin tried to shake off the disappointment of defeat by taking part in an eliminator for the British title, this time meeting Liverpool's John Watson at the city's Echo Arena. He was to lose for the second time despite putting his opponent down in the last round he'd left it too late and lost on points.

Gethin suffered his third defeat in a row when on 18 May 2009 he lost to journeyman Chris Long at the Holiday Inn in Birmingham, losing on points after being put down by Long in the last round. A victory the following month against another journeyman boxer, Jason Nesbitt, put Gethin back on winning ways before on 15 January 2010 he got the opportunity to once more fight for the English title. The fight, at the leisure centre in Altrincham, resulted in a 10-round points victory over challenger Graeme Higginson to become a two time holder of the title.

== Professional boxing record ==
38 fights	28 wins	9 losses
By knockout	12	6
By decision	16	3
Draws	1	

No.	Result	Record	Opponent	Type	Round, time	Date	Location	Notes
38	Loss	28–9–1	Jack Catterall	TKO	3 (10), 1:40	8 Apr 2017	Manchester Arena, Manchester, England	For WBO Inter-Continental light welterweight title
37	Win	28–8–1	John Wayne Hibbert	TKO	4 (10), 2:28	26 Nov 2016	Wembley Arena, London, England	Won vacant IBF International light welterweight title
36	Win	27–8–1	Liam Richards	PTS	4	19 Nov 2016	Town Hall, Walsall, England	
35	Loss	26–8–1	Adam Little	KO	3 (12)	17 Sep 2016	Hilton Hotel, Blackpool, England	
34	Win	26–7–1	Fonz Alexander	PTS	4	14 May 2016	Bescot Stadium, Walsall, England	
33	Loss	25–7–1	Tommy Coyle	RTD	5 (12), 3:00	7 Mar 2015	Ice Arena, Kingston upon Hull, England	
32	Win	25–6–1	Kevin McCauley	TD	5 (6), 1:03	6 Dec 2014	Hilton Hotel, Coventry, England	Points TD: An accidental head clash left Gethin with a cut on the left eye and the bout was halted
31	Loss	24–6–1	Terry Flanagan	RTD	7 (12), 3:00	26 Jul 2014	Phones 4u Arena, Manchester, England	For vacant British lightweight title
30	Loss	24–5–1	Derry Mathews	SD	12	10 May 2014	Olympia, Liverpool, England	Lost British lightweight title
29	Loss	24–4–1	Ammeth Díaz	KO	7 (12), 2:53	31 May 2013	Town Hall, Walsall, England	
28	Win	24–3–1	Ben Murphy	TKO	9 (12), 0:56	18 Jan 2013	Town Hall, Walsall, England	Won vacant British lightweight title
27	Win	23–3–1	Carl Johanneson	TKO	11 (12), 0:13	21 Sep 2012	Hilton Hotel, Westminster, England	Won vacant IBF International lightweight title
26	Win	22–3–1	Stuart Green	TKO	3 (10), 1:15	12 May 2012	Town Hall, Walsall, England	
25	Win	21–3–1	Csaba Torma	TKO	4 (6), 1:59	23 Mar 2012	Civic Hall, Wolverhampton, England	
24	Win	20–3–1	Ivan Godor	PTS	10	9 Mar 2012	East of England Arena, Peterborough, England	Won vacant International Masters welterweight title
23	Win	19–3–1	Arek Malek	PTS	6	18 Nov 2011	Town Hall, Walsall, England	
22	Win	18–3–1	John Baguley	PTS	6	16 Apr 2010	Robin Park Centre, Wigan, England	
21	Win	17–3–1	Graeme Higginson	UD	10	15 Jan 2010	Leisure Centre, Altrincham, England	Won vacant English lightweight title
20	Win	16–3–1	Jason Nesbitt	PTS	4	28 Jun 2009	Liquid Envy nightclub, Luton, England	
19	Loss	15–3–1	Chris Long	PTS	4	18 May 2009	Holiday Inn, Birmingham, England	
18	Loss	15–2–1	John Watson	PTS	10	28 Mar 2009	Echo Arena, Liverpool, England	
17	Loss	15–1–1	Scott Lawton	TKO	9 (10), 0:15	6 Dec 2008	Arena, Nottingham, England	Lost English lightweight title
16	Win	15–0–1	John Fewkes	TKO	4 (10), 2:30	5 Sep 2008	Harvey Hadden Leisure Centre, Nottingham, England	Won vacant English lightweight title; Title only at stake for Gethin as Fewkes misses weight
15	Win	14–0–1	Nadeem Siddique	TKO	7 (8), 2:42	11 Jul 2008	Robin Park Centre, Wigan, England	
14	Win	13–0–1	Ali Wyatt	PTS	8	25 Feb 2008	Burlington Hotel, Birmingham, England	
13	Win	12–0–1	Carl Allen	PTS	6	25 Jan 2008	Goresbrook Leisure Centre, Dagenham, England	
12	Win	11–0–1	Fabián Luque	TKO	4 (8), 0:24	7 Dec 2007	MGM Grand, Paradise, Nevada, U.S.	
11	Win	10–0–1	Darren Broomhall	TKO	3 (6), 1:59	8 Oct 2007	Burlington Hotel, Birmingham, England	
10	Win	9–0–1	Craig Johnson	PTS	10	15 Sep 2007	International Convention Centre, Birmingham, England	Won vacant Midlands Area lightweight title
9	Draw	8–0–1	Carl Allen	PTS	6	20 Apr 2007	Town Hall, Dudley, England	
8	Win	8–0	Judex Meemea	TKO	3 (10), 0:14	5 Dec 2006	Civic Hall, Wolverhampton, England	
7	Win	7–0	Kristian Laight	PTS	6	7 Nov 2006	Elland Road, Leeds, England	
6	Win	6–0	Baz Carey	PTS	4	1 Jun 2006	Aston Villa Leisure Centre, Birmingham, England	
5	Win	5–0	Carl Allen	PTS	4	10 Mar 2006	Bescot Stadium, Walsall, England	
4	Win	4–0	Michael Medor	PTS	4	25 Nov 2005	Town Hall, Walsall, England	
3	Win	3–0	John Paul Ryan	TKO	2 (6), 0:23	6 Oct 2005	Town Hall, Dudley, England	
2	Win	2–0	Jason Nesbitt	PTS	6	15 Apr 2005	Lord Hill Hotel, Shrewsbury, England	
1	Win	1–0	Kristian Laight	TKO	4 (6), 2:48	18 Nov 2004	McDonald-Albrighton Hall Hotel, Shrewsbury, England	
