= Schwer =

Schwer is a surname. Notable people with the surname include:

- Andreas Schwer (born 1966), German manager
- Billy Schwer (born 1969), English boxer
- Lea Schwer (born 1982), Swiss volleyball player

== See also ==
- r-colored vowel
