= Kristian Laight =

British boxer (born 1980)

Personal information
- Nickname: Mr Reliable
- Born: 15 July 1980 (age 46) Nuneaton, Warwickshire, England
- Weight: Lightweight; Light-welterweight; Welterweight

Boxing career
- Stance: Orthodox

Boxing record
- Total fights: 300
- Wins: 12
- Win by KO: 0
- Losses: 279
- Draws: 9

Kristian Laight (born 15 July 1980) is a British former professional boxer who competed from 2003 to 2018. In July 2018 he lost his 277th professional fight, which is known to be the most in boxing history, toppling the previous record, which was held since 2005 by Reggie Strickland. He was the debuting opponent for future British title holders Tyrone Nurse, Tommy Coyle and Lewis Ritson, and also fought Kevin Mitchell, and Derry Mathews, among others.

He was featured in a chapter of the 2014 book Journeymen: The Other Side of the Boxing Business by Mark Turley.

Laight enjoyed one of his most memorable victories in August 2015, when he upset Carl Chadwick in memory of his late trainer Lenny Woodhall, who had died a few weeks before.

He retired in 2018 with a record of 12–279–9, having been stopped only five times in his career. Following the announcement, Tony Bellew said that "without guys like him the pro game wouldn't exist" on Twitter.

== Professional boxing record ==
300 fights	12 wins	279 losses
By knockout	0	5
By decision	12	274
Draws	9	

No.	Result	Record	Opponent	Type	Round, time	Date	Location	Notes
300	Loss	12–279–9	Luke Beasley	PTS	4	28 Jul 2018	The Alan Higgs Centre, Coventry, England	
299	Loss	12–278–9	Simon Corcoran	PTS	4	14 Jul 2018	York Hall, London, England	
298	Loss	12–277–9	Connor Lee Jones	PTS	4	7 Jul 2018	The Venue, Dudley, England	
297	Loss	12–276–9	Sonny Price	PTS	4	30 Jun 2018	North Notts Arena, Worksop, England	
296	Loss	12–275–9	Calvin McCord	PTS	4	16 Jun 2018	Lagoon Leisure Centre, Paisley, Scotland	
295	Loss	12–274–9	Jack Newham	PTS	4	26 May 2018	York Hall, London, England	
294	Loss	12–273–9	Nathan McFarlane	PTS	4	19 May 2018	Holte Suite, Birmingham, England	
293	Loss	12–272–9	Dean Evans	PTS	6	12 May 2018	GL1 Leisure Centre, Gloucester, England	
292	Loss	12–271–9	Lenny Evans	PTS	4	5 May 2018	Holte Suite, Birmingham, England	
291	Loss	12–270–9	Bradley Townsend	PTS	4	28 Apr 2018	York Hall, London, England	
290	Loss	12–269–9	Carl Chadwick	PTS	4	6 Apr 2016	City Hall, Kingston upon Hull, England	
289	Draw	12–268–9	Youssef al-Hamidi	PTS	4	29 Mar 2018	Racecourse, Doncaster, England	
288	Loss	12–268–8	Youssef Khoumari	PTS	4	17 Mar 2018	York Hall, London England	
287	Loss	12–267–8	Liam Dillon	PTS	4	10 Mar 2018	York Hall, London, England	
286	Loss	12–266–8	Joe Eko	PTS	4	3 Mar 2018	Leisure Centre, Oldham, England	
285	Loss	12–265–8	Adam Ridge	PTS	4	24 Feb 2018	Whites Hotel (De Vera Whites), Bilton, England	
284	Loss	12–264–8	Lewis Booth	PTS	4	10 Feb 2018	Dearne Valley Leisure Centre, Denaby Main, England	
283	Loss	12–263–8	Muma Mweemba	PTS	4	2 Feb 2018	Ponds Forge Arena, Sheffield, England	
282	Loss	12–262–8	Andrew Felming	PTS	4	16 Dec 2017	Robin Park Centre, Wigan, England	
281	Loss	12–261–8	Connor Parker	PTS	4	9 Dec 2017	Imperial Banqueting Suite, Bilston, England	
280	Loss	12–260–8	Lee Gunter	PTS	4	2 Dec 2017	Holte Suite, Birmingham, England	
279	Loss	12–259–8	Connor Ireson	PTS	4	25 Nov 2017	Harvey Hadden Sports Village, Nottingham, England	
278	Loss	12–258–8	Reece MacMillan	PTS	4	18 Nov 2017	Bowlers Exhibition Centre, Manchester, England	
277	Loss	12–257–8	Ryan Watson	PTS	4	4 Nov 2017	BT Convention Centre, Liverpool, England	
276	Loss	12–256–8	Kane Gardner	PTS	4	28 Oct 2017	Leisure Centre, Oldham, England	
275	Loss	12–255–8	Adam Ridge	PTS	4	14 Oct 2017	Robin Park Centre, Wigan, England	
274	Loss	12–254–8	Muheeb Fazeldin	PTS	4	7 Oct 2017	Bowlers Exhibition Centre, Manchester, England	
273	Loss	12–253–8	Lee Connelly	PTS	6	30 Sep 2017	Kings Hall, Stoke-on-Trent, England	
272	Loss	12–252–8	Dean Dodge	PTS	4	16 Sep 2017	O2 Academy, Bournemouth, England	
271	Loss	12–251–8	Anesu Twala	PTS	4	9 Sep 2017	York Hall, London, England	
270	Loss	12–250–8	Ely Murphy	PTS	4	2 Sep 2017	Victoria Warehouse, Manchester, England	
269	Loss	12–249–8	Joe Eko	PTS	4	29 Jul 2017	Leisure Centre, Oldham, England	
268	Loss	12–248–8	Louis Aitken Fred	PTS	4	6 May 2017	Guildhall, Plymouth, England	
267	Loss	12–247–8	Tion Gibbs	PTS	4	29 Apr 2017	Holte Suite, Birmingham, England	
266	Loss	12–246–8	Jack O'Keeffe	PTS	4	22 Apr 2017	Tudor Grange Leisure Centre, Solihull, England	
265	Loss	12–245–8	Alex Florence	PTS	4	15 Apr 2017	PlayFootball Arena, Swindon, England	
264	Loss	12–244–8	Tony Buttigieg	PTS	4	8 Apr 2017	York Hall, London, England	
263	Loss	12–243–8	Cheznie Hawkins	PTS	4	1 Apr 2017	National Sports Centre, London, England	
262	Loss	12–242–8	Colin Day	PTS	4	24 Mar 2017	Robin Park Centre, Wigan, England	
261	Draw	12–241–8	Joe Ducker	PTS	6	11 Mar 2017	Harvey Hadden Sports Village, Nottingham, England	
260	Loss	12–241–7	Jay Hughes	PTS	4	4 Mar 2017	Rainton Meadows Arena, Houghton-le-Spring, England	
259	Loss	12–240–7	Michael Green	PTS	4	25 Feb 2017	Civic Hall, Bedworth, England	
258	Loss	12–239–7	Aaron Lovell	PTS	4	11 Feb 2017	Tudor Grange Leisure Centre, Solihull, England	
257	Loss	12–238–7	Ishmael Ellis	PTS	4	10 Dec 2016	Tudor Gange Leisure Centre, Solihull, England	
256	Loss	12–237–7	Tom McGuinness	PTS	4	3 Dec 2016	Sports Village, Leigh, England	
255	Loss	12–236–7	Scott Moises	PTS	4	25 Nov 2016	The Halls, Norwich, England	
254	Loss	12–235–7	Luke Willis	PTS	4	18 Nov 2016	Victoria Warehouse, Manchester, England	
253	Loss	12–234–7	Ikram Hussein	PTS	4	11 Nov 2016	The Venue, Birmingham, England	
252	Loss	12–233–7	Kane Baker	PTS	4	4 Nov 2016	The Venue, Dudley, England	
251	Loss	12–232–7	Peter McGurk	PTS	6	23 Oct 2016	Hermitage Leisure Centre, Whitwick, England	
250	Loss	12–231–7	Mike Cole	PTS	4	8 Oct 2016	Holiday Inn, Birmingham, England	
249	Loss	12–230–7	Manny Zaber	PTS	4	24 Sep 2016	Town Hall, Walsall, England	
248	Loss	12–229–7	Luke Evans	PTS	4	17 Sep 2016	Victoria Warehouse, Manchester, England	
247	Win	12–228–7	Sean Crowley	PTS	4	3 Sep 2016	Robin Park Centre, Wigan, England	
246	Loss	11–228–7	Darren Townley	PTS	4	30 Jul 2016	Guildhall, Plymouth, England	
245	Loss	11–227–7	Shaun Dick	PTS	4	24 Jun 2026	Radisson Blu Arena, Glasgow, Scotland	
244	Loss	11–226–7	Akeem Ennis-Brown	PTS	4	10 Jun 2026	Grange Leisure Centre, Swindon, England	
243	Loss	11–225–7	Gerard Carroll	PTS	4	29 Kay 2026	Goodison Park, Liverpool, England	
242	Loss	11–224–7	Josh Nelson	PTS	4	14 May 2016	York Hall, London, England	
241	Loss	11–223–7	David Birmingham	PTS	4	7 May 2016	York Hall, London, England	
240	Loss	11–222–7	Jake Bulger	PTS	4	23 Apr 2016	Devonshire Dome, Buxton, England	
239	Loss	11–221–7	Tim Cutler	PTS	4	16 Apr 2026	Action Indoor Sports (Whitchurch Leisure Centre), Bristol, England	
238	Loss	11–220–7	Danny Parsons	PTS	4	9 Apr 2016	K2 Leisure Centre, Crawley, England	
237	Loss	11–219–7	Sean Ben Mulligan	PTS	4	19 Mar 2016	Victoria Warehouse, Manchester, England	
236	Loss	11–218–7	George Horner	PTS	4	11 Mar 2016	Beachomber Club, Cleethorpes, England	
235	Loss	11–217–7	Steven Beattie	PTS	4	27 Feb 2016	Bellahouston Leisure Centre, Glasgow, Scotland	
234	Win	11–216–7	Ali Wyatt	PTS	6	20 Feb 2016	Civic Hall, Bedworth, England	
233	Loss	10–216–7	Kane Stewart	PTS	4	13 Feb 2016	GL1 Leisure Centre, Gloucester, England	
232	Loss	10–215–7	Leon Field	PTS	4	6 Feb 2016	Magna Centre, Rotherham, England	
231	Loss	10–214–7	Ali Wyatt	PTS	8	28 Jan 2016	Park Lane Hotel Mayfair, London, England	
230	Loss	10–213–7	Adam Hague	PTS	4	12 Dec 2015	Winter Gardens, Blackpool, England	
229	Loss	10–212–7	Thomas Dickson	PTS	4	5 Dec 2015	Meadowbank Leisure Centre, Edinburgh, Scotland	
228	Loss	10–211–7	Steven Hale	PTS	6	28 Nov 2015	Dome, Doncaster, England	
227	Loss	10–210–7	Michael Peart	PTS	6	21 Nov 2015	York Hall, London, England	
226	Loss	10–209–7	James Thomson	PTS	6	14 Nov 2015	Albert Halls, Stirling, Scotland	
225	Loss	10–208–7	Ben Smith	PTS	4	30 Oct 2015	Harrow Leisure Centre, London, England	
224	Loss	10–207–7	Jake Bulger	PTS	4	23 Oct 2015	Devonshire Dome, Buxton, England	
223	Loss	10–206–7	Zelfa Barrett	PTS	4	19 Sep 2015	Olympia, Liverpool, England	
222	Loss	10–205–7	Tony Jones	PTS	4	12 Sep 2015	Holte Suite, Birmingham, England	
221	Loss	10–204–7	Lewis Benson	PTS	4	5 Sep 2015	Meadowbank Sports Centre, Edinburgh, Scotland	
220	Loss	10–203–7	Lewis Booth	PTS	4	29 Aug 2015	Dome, Doncaster, England	
219	Win	10–202–7	Carl Chadwick	PTS	4	1 Aug 2015	Craven Park Stadium, Kingston upon Hull, England	
218	Loss	9–202–7	Nathan Kirk	PTS	4	25 Jul 2015	Arena, Derby, England	
217	Loss	9–201–7	Asinia Byfield	PTS	4	18 Jul 2015	York Hall, London, England	
216	Loss	9–200–7	Cori Gibbs	PTS	4	13 Jun 2015	Civic Hall, Bedworth, England	
215	Loss	9–199–7	Qasim Niaz	PTS	4	30 Mar 2015	Arena, Middleton, England	
214	Loss	9–198–7	Hamed Ghaz	PTS	4	15 May 2015	IceSheffield, Sheffield, England	
213	Loss	9–197–7	Lewis Ritson	PTS	4	4 Apr 2015	Metro Radio Arena, Newcastle upon Tyne, England	
212	Loss	9–196–7	Tom Farrell	PTS	4	21 Mar 2015	Olympia, Liverpool, England	
211	Loss	9–195–7	Andy Kremner	PTS	4	14 Mar 2015	Victoria Warehouse, Manchester, England	
210	Loss	9–194–7	Shakeeb Ali	PTS	4	28 Feb 2015	Guild Hall, Preston England	
209	Loss	9–193–7	Ryan Nandha	PTS	4	13 Feb 2015	The Halls, Norwich, England	
208	Loss	9–192–7	Nathan French	PTS	4	20 Dec 2014	City Hall, Kingston upon Hall, England	
207	Loss	9–191–7	Andy Colquhoun	PTS	6	13 Dec 2014	Sports Centre, Oldham, England	
206	Loss	9–190–7	Steve Brogan	PTS	4	6 Dec 2014	Olympia, Liverpool, England	
205	Loss	9–189–7	Charlie Williams	PTS	4	22 Nov 2014	Holte Suite, Birmingham, England	
204	Loss	9–188–7	Ryan Bennett	PTS	4	7 Nov 2014	North Kesrven Centre, North Hykeham England	
203	Loss	9–187–7	Zelfa Barrett	PTS	4	25 Ict 2014	Arena, Middleton, England	
202	Loss	9–186–7	Chris Conwell	PTS	4	18 Oct 2014	Victoria Warehouse, Manchester, England	
201	Loss	9–185–7	Danny Gunn	PTS	4	11 Oct 2014	Mercy Premier Nightclub, Norwich, England	
200	Loss	9–184–7	Kieron McLaren	PTS	4	4 Oct 2014	Chase Leisure Centre, Cannock, England	
199	Loss	9–183–7	Lee Redpath	PTS	6	21 Sep 2014	Miners Welfare Club, Cleland, Scotland	
198	Loss	9–182–7	Elvis Makoda	PTS	4	14 Sep 2014	York Hall, London, England	
197	Loss	9–181–7	Atif Mushtaq	PTS	4	6 Sep 2014	King George's Hall, Blackburn, England	
196	Loss	9–180–7	Declan Geraghty	PTS	4	26 Jul 2014	Phones 4u Arena, Manchester, England	
195	Loss	9–179–7	Jack Dishart	PTS	4	18 Jul 2014	Camden Centre, London, England	
194	Loss	9–178–7	Ryan Smith	PTS	4	27 Jun 2014	Braehead Arena, Glasgow, Scotland	
193	Loss	9–177–7	Kerry Evans	TKO	4 (4), 2:17	24 May 2014	Deeside Leisure Centre, Queensferry, Wales	
192	Loss	9–176–7	Rob Sharpe	PTS	4	16 May 2014	Rushcliffe Arena, Nottingham, England	
191	Loss	9–175–7	Lee Appleyard	PTS	4	9 May 2024	IceSheffield, Sheffield, England	
190	Loss	9–174–7	Anthony Upton	PTS	4	26 Apr 2013	The Troxy, London, England	
189	Loss	9–173–7	Rakeem Noble	PTS	4	19 Apr 2014	York Hall, London, England	
188	Loss	9–172–7	Pete Leeworthy	PTS	4	5 Apr 2014	The Forum, Bath, England	
187	Win	9–171–7	Aaron Flinn	PTS	4	29 Mar 2024	Civic Hall, Bedworth, England	
186	Loss	8–171–7	Louis Fielding	PTS	4	22 Mar 2024	Tower Ballroom, Birmingham, England	
185	Loss	8–170–7	Thomas Jarvis	PTS	4	15 Nar 2014	Rivermead Leisure Centre, Reading, England	
184	Loss	8–169–7	Marvin Greaves	PTS	4	8 Mar 2014	Sports Centre, Oldham, England	
183	Loss	8–168–7	Kevin Hooper	PTS	4	1 Mar 2014	North Kesteven Centre, North Hykeham, England	
182	Loss	8–167–7	Charlie Payton	PTS	4	22 Feb 2014	Ice Arena, Kingston upon Hull, England	
181	Win	8–166–7	Craig Whyatt	PTS	4	30 Jan 2014	Millennium Hotel Mayfair, London, England	
180	Loss	7–166–7	Michael Rooney	PTS	4	19 Dec 2013	Holiday Inn, Birmingham, England	
179	Loss	7–165–7	Artif Ali	PTS	4	6 Dec 2013	Municipal Hall, Colne, England	
178	Loss	7–164–7	Greg Pickin	PTS	4	29 Nov 2013	Oceana, Swansea, Wales	
177	Loss	7–163–7	Adrian Gonzalez	PTS	6	22 Nov 2013	Bowlers Exhibition Centre, Manchester, England	
176	Loss	7–162–7	Isaac Lowe	PTS	6	15 Nov 2013	Winter Gardens, Blackpool, England	
175	Loss	7–161–7	Alex Dilmaghani	PTS	4	26 Oct 2013	Civic Hall, Trowbridge, England	
174	Loss	7–160–7	Kofi Yates	PTS	4	12 Oct 2023	Whites Hotel (De Vera Whites), Bolton, England	
173	Loss	7–159–7	Callum Cooke	PTS	4	5 Oct 2013	Sports Centre, Oldham, England	
172	Loss	7–158–7	Dean Burrell	PTS	4	27 Sep 2013	York Hall, London, England	
171	Loss	7–157–7	Craig Poxton	PTS	4	14 Sep 2013	Epic Centre, Norwich, England	
170	Loss	7–156–7	Luke Paddock	PTS	4	7 Sep 2013	Town Hall, Walsall, England	
169	Loss	7–155–7	Tommy Martin	PTS	4	27 Jul 2013	York Hall, London, England	
168	Draw	7–154–7	Atif Mushtaq	PTS	4	20 Jul 2013	Whites Hotel (De Vera Whites), Bolton, England	
167	Loss	7–154–6	Josh Morgan	PTS	4	6 Jul 2013	Dome, Doncaster, England	
166	Loss	7–153–6	Sohail Ahmad	PTS	4	29 Jun 2013	York Hall, London, England	
165	Loss	7–152–6	Jordan Gill	PTS	4	22 Jun 2013	East of England Arena, Peterborough, England	
164	Loss	7–151–6	Craig Poxton	PTS	4	15 Jun 2013	Epic Centre, Norwich, England	
163	Loss	7–150–6	Jordan McCorry	PTS	4	7 Jun 2013	Bellahouston Leisure Centre, Glasgow, Scotland	
162	Loss	7–149–6	Dan Naylor	PTS	6	31 May 2013	Civic Hall, Bedworth, England	
161	Loss	7–148–6	Dean Swanson	PTS	4	24 May 2013	Olympia, Liverpool, England	
160	Loss	7–147–6	Atif Shafiq	PTS	4	17 May 2013	Ponds Forge Arena, Sheffield, England	
159	Loss	7–146–6	Kofi Yates	PTS	4	10 May 2013	Wythenshawe Forum, Manchester, England	
158	Loss	7–145–6	Matty Fagan	PTS	4	20 Apr 2013	Wembley Arena, London, England	
157	Loss	7–144–6	Václav Škromach	PTS	6	29 Mar 2013	Metrodome, Barnsley, England	
156	Loss	7–143–6	Alex Rutter	PTS	4	22 Mar 2013	Town Hall, Leeds, England	
155	Loss	7–142–6	Liam Taylor	PTS	4	9 Mar 2013	Whites Hotel (De Vera Whites), Bolton, England	
154	Loss	7–141–6	Adam Kettleborough	PTS	4	2 Mar 2013	North Kesteven Centre, North Hykeham, England	
153	Loss	7–140–6	Thomas Stalker	PTS	4	23 Feb 2013	York Hall, London, England	
152	Loss	7–139–6	Leigh Wood	PTS	4	2 Feb 2006	East of England Arena, Peterborough, England	
151	Loss	7–138–6	Taz Apergis	PTS	4	23 Dec 2012	Lancashire County Cricket Club, Manchester, England	
150	Loss	7–137–6	Lee Martin	PTS	4	6 Dec 2012	Civic Hall, Grays, England	
149	Loss	7–136–6	James Fryers	PTS	4	27 Nov 2012	Royal Lancaster Hotel Bayswater, London, England	
148	Loss	7–135–6	Konrad Dąbrowski	PTS	4	17 Niv 2012	Arena, Nottingham, England	
147	Loss	7–134–6	Rizwan Rasool	PTS	4	9 Nov 2012	The Venue, Dudley, England	
146	Loss	7–133–6	Kieran McGhee	PTS	4	2 Nov 2012	Magnus School Sports Centre, Newark, England	
145	Loss	7–132–6	Leo D'Erlanger	PTS	4	13 Oct 2012	Glow, Greenhithe, England	
144	Win	7–131–6	Kevin Hanks	PTS	6	6 Oct 2012	Sir Stanley Matthews Sports Centre, Stoke-on-Trent, England	
143	Loss	6–131–6	Jon Kays	PTS	6	22 Sep 2012	Bowlers Exhibition Centre, Manchester, England	
142	Loss	6–130–6	Scott Moises	PTS	4	15 Sep 2012	Norfolk Showground, Norwich, England	
141	Loss	6–129–6	Martin Joseph Ward	PTS	4	8 Sep 2012	Alexandra Palace, London, England	
140	Loss	6–128–6	Jazza Dickens	PTS	6	29 Jul 2012	Devonshire House Hotel, Liverpool, England	
139	Loss	6–127–6	Lee Mould	PTS	4	15 Jul 2012	Stadium of Light, Sunderland, England	
138	Loss	6–126–6	Jordan Gill	PTS	4	7 Jul 2012	Arena, Sheffield, England	
137	Loss	6–125–6	Femi Fehintola	PTS	6	23 Jun 2012	Don Valley Stadium, Sheffield, England	
136	Loss	6–124–6	Scott Jenkins	PTS	4	16 Jun 2012	Velodrome, Manchester, England	
135	Loss	6–123–6	Danny Carter	PTS	4	2 Jun 2012	GL1 Leisure Centre, Gloucester, England	
134	Loss	6–122–6	Sean Dodd	PTS	4	19 May 2012	Aintree Equestrian Centre, Liverpool, England	
133	Loss	6–121–6	Sam O'maison	PTS	4	12 May 2012	Hillsborough Leisure Centre, Sheffield, England	
132	Loss	6–120–6	Ben Wager	PTS	4	27 Apr 2012	Metrodome, Barnsley, England	
131	Loss	6–119–6	Ismail Anwar	PTS	4	14 Apr 2012	North Bridge Leisure Centre, Halifax, England	
130	Loss	6–118–6	Anthony Cacace	PTS	4	7 Apr 2012	Grove Leisure Centre, Newark-on-Trent, England	
129	Loss	6–117–6	Terry Flanagan	PTS	4	31 Mar 2012	Winter Gardens, Blackpool, England	
128	Loss	6–116–6	Billy Dawson	PTS	4	24 Mar 2011	City Hall, Kingston upon Hull, England	
127	Loss	6–115–6	Jake Smith	PTS	4	10 Mar 2012	Olympia, Liverpool, England	
126	Loss	6–114–6	Robbie Barrett	PTS	4	2 Mar 2012	Dome, Doncaster, England	
125	Loss	6–113–6	Joel Haigh	PTS	6	24 Feb 2012	Leisure Centre, Grimsby, England	
124	Loss	6–112–6	Mark Evans	PTS	4	3 Feb 2012	Bowlers Exhibition Centre, Manchester, England	
123	Loss	6–111–6	Joe Tonks	PTS	4	20 Jan 2012	Olympia, Liverpool, England	
122	Loss	6–110–6	Jamie Sampson	PTS	6	16 Dec 2011	Don Valley Stadium, Sheffield, England	
121	Loss	6–109–6	Mike Biggs	PTS	4	3 Dec 2011	Olympiad Leisure Centre, Chippenham, England	
120	Loss	6–108–6	Ben Day	PTS	4	25 Nov 2011	Coronet Theatre, London, England	
119	Loss	6–107–6	Adam Dingsdale	PTS	4	4 Nov 2011	Dome, Doncaster, England	
118	Loss	6–106–6	John Quigley	PTS	4	28 Oct 2011	Bowlers Exhibition Centre, Manchester, England	
117	Loss	6–105–6	Paul Davies	PTS	4	15 Oct 2011	Northgate Arena, Chester, England	
116	Loss	6–104–6	Liam Taylor	PTS	4	8 Oct 2011	Sports Centre, Oldham, England	
115	Loss	6–103–6	Tommy Carus	PTS	4	30 Sep 2011	Olympia, Liverpool, England	
114	Loss	6–102–6	Lee Stewart	PTS	4	23 Sep 2011	Metrodome, Barnsley, England	
113	Loss	6–101–6	Justin Newell	PTS	4	15 Sep 2011	Irish Centre, Leeds, England	
112	Loss	6–100–6	Ronnie Clark	PTS	6	3 Sep 2011	Lagoon Leisure Centre, Paisley, Scotland	
111	Loss	6–99–6	Rhys Roberts	PTS	4	23 Jul 2011	Castle Leisure Centre, Bury, England	
110	Loss	6–98–6	Jamie Speight	PTS	8	9 Jul 2011	Guildhall, Plymouth, England	
109	Loss	6–97–6	Ashley Mayall	PTS	6	25 Jun 2011	George Carnall Leisure Centre, Manchester, England	
108	Loss	6–96–6	Sean Watson	PTS	6	17 Jun 2011	Thistle Hotel, Glasgow, Scotland	
107	Loss	6–95–6	Eddie Doyle	PTS	8	3 Jun 2011	Kelvin Hall, Glasgow, Scotland	
106	Loss	6–94–6	Tom Shaw	PTS	4	20 May 2011	Deeside Leisure Centre, Queensferry, Wales	
105	Loss	6–93–6	Sam Standing	PTS	4	7 May 2011	York Hall, London, England	
104	Loss	6–92–6	Jamie Spence	PTS	10	1 Apr 2011	Park Inn Hotel, Northampton, England	
103	Loss	6–91–6	Ricky Boylan	PTS	4	19 Mar 2011	Goresbrook Leisure Centre, London, England	
102	Loss	6–90–6	Terry Needham	PTS	4	4 Mar 2011	Municipal Hall, Colne, England	
101	Loss	6–89–6	Arran McKelvie	PTS	6	21 Feb 2011	Thistle Hotel, Glasgow, Scotland	
100	Loss	6–88–6	Chad Gaynor	PTS	4	22 Jan 2011	Dome, Doncaster, England	
99	Loss	6–87–6	Paul Archer	PTS	4	12 Dec 2010	Rainton Meadows Arena, Houghton-le-Spring, England	
98	Loss	6–86–6	Maxi Hughes	PTS	4	3 Dec 2010	Dome, Doncaster, England	
97	Loss	6–85–6	Kieran Farrell	PTS	4	21 Nov 2010	George Carnall Leisure Centre, Manchester, England	
96	Loss	6–84–6	Charlie King	PTS	8	18 Oct 2010	Radisson Hotel, Glasgow, Scotland	
95	Loss	6–83–6	Wayne Bennett	PTS	4	8 Oct 2010	Municipal Hall, Colne, England	
94	Loss	6–82–6	Amir Unsworth	PTS	6	17 Sep 2010	Dome, Doncaster, England	
93	Loss	6–81–6	Chris Truman	PTS	4	5 Sep 2010	Civic Hall, Wolverhampton, England	
92	Loss	6–80–6	Derry Mathews	PTS	4	17 Jul 2010	Fit City, Broughton, England	
91	Loss	6–79–6	Kevin Hooper	PTS	6	4 Jul 2010	Beachomber Club, Cleethorpes, England	
90	Loss	6–78–6	Tony Owen	PTS	4	19 Jun 2010	York Hall, London, England	
89	Loss	6–77–6	Matty Tew	PTS	4	5 Jun 2010	Grundy Park Leisure Centre, Cheshunt, England	
88	Loss	6–76–6	Jay Morris	PTS	10	29 May 2010	Corn Exchange, Bedford, England	
87	Loss	6–75–6	Shayne Singleton	PTS	4	22 May 2010	Municipal Hall, Colne, England	
86	Draw	6–74–6	Bob Urry	PTS	6	2 May 2010	KC Sports Arena, Kingston upon Hull, England	
85	Loss	6–74–5	James Flinn	PTS	4	23 Apr 2010	Skydome, Coventry, England	
84	Loss	6–73–5	Stephen Jennings	PTS	6	14 Mar 2010	Whites Hotel (De Vera Whites), Bolton, England	
83	Loss	6–72–5	Dale Miles	TKO	2 (6), 1:25	5 Feb 2010	Harvey Hadden Leisure Centre, Nottingham, England	
82	Loss	6–71–5	Chris Evangelou	PTS	4	18 Dec 2009	York Hall, London, England	
81	Loss	6–70–5	Ryan Hookway	PTS	6	5 Dec 2009	Hilton Hotel, Coventry, England	
80	Loss	6–69–5	Kieran Maher	PTS	4	27 Nov 2009	Robin Park Centre, Wigan, England	
79	Loss	6–68–5	Phil Gill	PTS	4	5 Nov 2009	The Troxy, London, England	
78	Loss	6–67–5	George Watson	PTS	4	16 Oct 2009	Seaburn Centre, Sunderland, England	
77	Loss	6–66–5	Martin Gordon	PTS	6	9 Oct 2009	The Venue, Dudley, England	
76	Loss	6–65–5	Bobby Gladman	PTS	4	25 Sep 2009	Colosseum, Watford, England	
75	Loss	6–64–5	Tommy Coyle	PTS	6	18 Sep 2009	Dome, Doncaster, England	
74	Loss	6–63–5	Graeme Higginson	PTS	6	21 Aug 2009	Velodrome, Manchester, England	
73	Loss	6–62–5	Chris Mullen	PTS	4	10 Jul 2009	Seaburn Centre, Sunderland, England	
72	Loss	6–61–5	Martin Welsh	PTS	4	30 Jun 2009	York Hall, London, England	
71	Loss	6–60–5	Glen Matsell	PTS	6	6 Jun 2009	Leisure Centre, Beverley, England	
70	Loss	6–59–5	Mark Walsh	PTS	4	23 May 2009	Northgate Leisure Centre, Sleaford, England	
69	Loss	6–58–5	Nick Quigley	PTS	4	17 Apr 2009	Sports Village, Leigh, England	
68	Loss	6–57–5	Rob Doody	PTS	6	3 Apr 2009	Civic Hall, Wolverhampton, England	
67	Loss	6–56–5	Henry Castle	PTS	6	20 Mar 2009	Newham Leisure Centre, London, England	
66	Loss	6–55–5	Rick Godding	PTS	4	6 Mar 2009	Robin Park Centre, Wigan, England	
65	Win	6–54–5	Danny Coyle	PTS	6	21 Dec 2008	Hilton Hotel, Coventry, England	
64	Loss	5–54–5	Nathan McIntosh	PTS	6	6 Dec 2008	Arena, Nottingham, England	
63	Loss	5–53–5	Ben Lawler	PTS	6	29 Nov 2008	Northgate Leisure Centre, Sleaford, England	
62	Loss	5–52–5	Richard Ghent	PTS	4	9 Nov 2008	Civic Centre, Wolverhampton, England	
61	Loss	5–51–5	Chris Lewis	PTS	6	6 Oct 2008	Holiday Inn, Birmingham, England	
60	Loss	5–50–5	Jack Perry	PTS	6	22 Jun 2008	University, Derby, England	
59	Loss	5–49–5	Lee Jennings	PTS	6	15 Jun 2008	Sutton Sports Centre, St Helens, England	
58	Loss	5–48–5	Chris O'Brien	PTS	6	23 May 2008	Robin Oark Centre, Wigan, England	
57	Loss	5–47–5	Dean Arnold	PTS	6	12 May 2008	Burlington Hotel, Birmingham, England	
56	Loss	5–46–5	Chris Long	PTS	4	2 May 2008	Marriott Hotel, Bristol, England	
55	Loss	5–45–5	Darren Askew	PTS	6	20 Apr 2008	Tara Leisure Centre, Shaw, England	
54	Loss	5–44–5	Tyrone Nurse	PTS	4	28 Mar 2008	Metrodome, Barnsley, England	
53	Loss	5–43–5	Scott Evans	PTS	6	28 Feb 2008	Civic Hall, Wolverhampton, England	
52	Loss	5–42–5	John Wainwright	PTS	6	15 Feb 2008	Don Valley Stadium, Sheffield, England	
51	Loss	5–41–5	Jack Perry	PTS	4	28 Jan 2008	Meadowside Leisure Centre, Burton upon Trent England	
50	Loss	5–40–5	Rick Godding	PTS	6	23 Dec 2007	Whites Hotel (De Vera Whites), Bolton, England	
49	Loss	5–39–5	Graham Fearn	PTS	6	10 Dec 2007	Ramada Jarvis Hotel, Leicester, England	
48	Loss	5–38–5	Ross Hewitt	PTS	4	30 Nov 2007	Newham Leisure Centre, London, England	
47	Loss	5–37–5	Stuart Kennedy	PTS	6	23 Nov 2007	Rainton Meadows Arena, Houghton-le-Spring, England	
46	Loss	5–36–5	Stefy Bull	PTS	4	19 Oct 2007	Dome, Doncaster, England	
45	Loss	5–35–5	George Watson	PTS	6	5 Oct 2007	Roker Hotel, Sunderland, England	
44	Loss	5–34–5	Ruben Giles	PTS	4	27 Apr 2007	Wembley Arena, London, England	
43	Win	5–33–5	Martin Gordon	PTS	4	20 Apr 2007	Town Hall, Dudley, England	
42	Loss	4–33–5	Gary Sykes	PTS	4	13 Apr 2007	Leisure Centre, Altrincham, England	
41	Loss	4–32–5	Dean Harrison	PTS	4	23 Mar 2007	Arena, Nottingham, England	
40	Loss	4–31–5	Lee Purdy	PTS	4	16 Mar 2007	Norfolk Showground, Norwich, England	
39	Loss	4–30–5	Chris Goodwin	PTS	6	24 Feb 2007	Kings Hall, Stoke-on-Trent, England	
38	Loss	4–29–5	Rob Hunt	PTS	6	15 Feb 2007	Town Hall, Dudley, England	
37	Win	4–28–5	Ali Hussein	PTS	6	7 Dec 2006	Hilton Hotel (Norfolk Gardens), Bradford, England	
36	Loss	3–28–5	Jack Perry	PTS	4	24 Nov 2006	Arena, Nottingham, England	
35	Loss	3–27–5	Martin Gethin	PTS	6	7 Nov 2006	LUFC Banqueting Suite, Leeds, England	
34	Loss	3–26–5	Dean Harrison	PTS	4	26 Oct 2006	Town Hall, Dudley, England	
33	Draw	3–25–5	Baz Carey	PTS	6	9 Oct 2006	Civic Hall, Bedworth, England	
32	Loss	3–25–4	John Fewkes	TKO	5 (6), 2:48	21 Jul 2006	Leisure Centre, Altrincham, England	
31	Win	3–24–4	Neil McQuade	PTS	6	15 Jun 2006	Holiday Inn, Peterborough, England	
30	Loss	2–24–4	Akaash Bhatia	PTS	4	30 May 2006	York Hall, London, England	
29	Loss	2–23–4	Chris Long	PTS	6	21 May 2006	Jurys Hotel, Bristol, England	
28	Loss	2–22–4	Paul Holborn	PTS	6	11 May 2006	Roker Hotel, Sunderland, England	
27	Win	2–21–4	Wez Miller	PTS	6	21 Apr 2006	Dome, Doncaster, England	
26	Loss	1–21–4	Tristan Davies	PTS	6	14 Apr 2006	Oakengates Thetare, Telford, England	
25	Loss	1–20–4	Jaz Virdee	PTS	6	30 Mar 2006	Holiday Inn, Peterborough, England	
24	Loss	1–19–4	Jeff Thomas	PTS	6	2 Mar 2006	Norcalympia, Blackpool, England	
23	Loss	1–18–4	Haider Ali	PTS	4	16 Feb 2006	Town Hall, Dudley, England	
22	Loss	1–17–4	Garry O'Connor	PTS	6	18 Dec 2005	Whites Hotel (De Vera Whites), Bolton, England	
21	Draw	1–16–4	Charlie Thompson	PTS	6	2 Dec 2005	Dome, Doncaster, England	
20	Draw	1–16–3	Barry Downs	PTS	6	20 Nov 2005	Tara Leisure Centre, Shaw, England	
19	Loss	1–16–2	Danny Gwilym	PTS	6	12 Nov 2005	Thistle Hotel, Bristol, England	
18	Loss	1–15–2	Andrew Ferrans	PTS	8	24 Oct 2005	St.Andrew's Sporting Club, Glasgow, Scotland	
17	Loss	1–14–2	Tom Hogan	PTS	6	6 Oct 2005	Marriott Hotel, Sunderland, England	
16	Loss	1–13–2	Scott Haywood	PTS	6	2 Sep 2005	Heritage Hotel, Derby, England	
15	Loss	1–12–2	Chris Long	PTS	6	9 Jul 2005	Whitchurch Sports Centre, Bristol, England	
14	Draw	1–11–2	John Paul Ryan	PTS	6	25 Jun 2005	Cattle Market, Melton Mowbray, England	
13	Loss	1–11–1	Nadeem Siddique	TKO	7 (8), 0:55	8 May 2005	Town and Country Club, Bradford, England	
12	Loss	1–10–1	Baz Carey	PTS	6	17 Dec 2004	Sports Centre, Coventry, England	
11	Loss	1–9–1	Martin Gethin	TKO	4 (6), 2:48	18 Nov 2004	McDonald-Albright Hall Hotel, Shrewsbury, England	
10	Loss	1–8–1	Sean Hughes	PTS	6	23 Oct 2004	Lightwaves Leisure Centre, Wakefield, England	
9	Loss	1–7–1	Ryan Barrett	PTS	4	19 Jun 2004	Alexandra Palace, London, England	
8	Draw	1–6–1	Gary Coombes	PTS	6	4 Jun 2004	Town Hall, Dudley, England	
7	Loss	1–6	Femi Fehintola	PTS	6	20 Apr 2004	Octagon Centre, Sheffield, England	
6	Win	1–5	Jaz Virdee	PTS	6	8 Apr 2004	Moat House, Peterborough, England	
5	Loss	0–5	Chris McDonagh	PTS	6	30 Mar 2004	Guildhall, Southampton, England	
4	Loss	0–4	Kevin Mitchell	PTS	4	7 Feb 2004	York Hall, London, England	
3	Loss	0–3	Justin Hicks	PTS	6	4 Dec 2003	Dolman Exhibition Hall, Bristol, England	
2	Loss	0–2	Matty Teague	PTS	6	14 Nov 2003	Willerby Manor Hotel, Kingston upon Hull, England	
1	Loss	0–1	James Paisley	PTS	6	26 Sep 2003	Britannia International Hotel, London, England	
