= Sam Bowen (boxer) =

British boxer

Personal information
- Nickname: Bullet
- Born: England
- Height: 5 ft 8 in (173 cm)
- Weight: Super-featherweight

Boxing career
- Reach: 69 in (175 cm)
- Stance: Orthodox

Boxing record
- Total fights: 16
- Wins: 15
- Win by KO: 11
- Losses: 1

Sam Bowen is a British professional boxer who held the British super-featherweight title from 2018 to 2019.

== Professional career ==
Bowen made his professional debut on 25 March 2015, scoring a first-round technical knockout (TKO) victory over Richard Walter at the Civic Hall In Bedworth, Warwickshire.

After winning his first twelve fights, eight by stoppage, Bowen fought Maxi Hughes (18–3–2) for the vacant British super-featherweight title at the King Power Stadium in Leicester, winning via eighth-round TKO.

On 6 October 2018, he faced Horacio Alfredo Cabral at the Leicester Arena. Bowen scored a fourth-round TKO victory to capture the vacant WBO Inter-Continental super-featherweight title.

== Professional boxing record ==
16 fights	15 wins	1 loss
By knockout	11	0
By decision	4	1

No.	Result	Record	Opponent	Type	Round, time	Date	Location	Notes
16	Loss	15–1	Anthony Cacace	SD	12	30 Nov 2019	Arena Birmingham, Birmingham, England	Lost British super-featherweight title
15	Win	15–0	Jordan McCorry	TKO	9 (12), 0:33	23 Mar 2019	Leicester Arena, Leicester, England	Retained British super-featherweight title
14	Win	14–0	Horacio Alfredo Cabral	KO	4 (10), 2:07	6 Oct 2018	Leicester Arena, Leicester, England	Won vacant WBO Inter-Continental super-featherweight title
13	Win	13–0	Maxi Hughes	TKO	8 (12), 0:02	14 Apr 2018	King Power Stadium, Leicester, England	Won vacant British super-featherweight title
12	Win	12–0	Juan Ocura	PTS	6	9 Sep 2017	Braunstone Leisure Centre, Leicester, England	
11	Win	11–0	Lorenzo Parra	TKO	1 (6), 1:56	7 Jul 2017	Town Hall, Walsall, England	
10	Win	10–0	Juan Luis Gonzalez	TKO	4 (10), 0:55	11 Mar 2017	Harvey Hadden Sports Village, Nottingham, England	
9	Win	9–0	Ivaylo Boyanov	KO	1 (6), 2:48	3 Dec 2016	Hilton Hotel, Coventry, England	
8	Win	8–0	Reynaldo Mora	KO	2 (6), 1:36	22 Oct 2016	Barclaycard Arena, Birmingham, England	
7	Win	7–0	Abdon Cesar	RTD	2 (8), 3:00	16 Sep 2016	Barnsley Metrodome, Barnsley, England	
6	Win	6–0	Virgile Degonzaga	KO	2 (8), 2:13	21 May 2016	Civic Hall, Bedworth, England	
5	Win	5–0	Marcos Soria	TKO	1 (6), 1:50	20 Feb 2016	Civic Hall, Bedworth, England	
4	Win	4–0	Jamie Quinn	PTS	6	5 Dec 2015	Hilton Hotel, Coventry, England	
3	Win	3–0	Liam Richards	PTS	4	19 Sep 2015	Civic Hall, Bedworth, England	
2	Win	2–0	Ibrar Riyaz	PTS	4	13 Jun 2015	Civic Hall, Bedworth, England	
1	Win	1–0	Richard Walter	TKO	1 (4), 0:52	28 Mar 2015	Civic Hall, Bedworth, England	
