= Martin Joseph Ward =

British professional boxer (born 1991)

Personal information
- Nickname: Wardy
- Nationality: British
- Born: 13 July 1991 (age 35) Leeds, England
- Height: 5 ft 8 in (173 cm)
- Weight: Super-featherweight; Lightweight

Boxing career
- Stance: Orthodox

Boxing record
- Total fights: 28
- Wins: 24
- Win by KO: 11
- Losses: 2
- Draws: 2

Martin Joseph Ward (born 13 July 1991) is a British professional boxer. He held the British super-featherweight title from 2016 to 2017, and the Commonwealth and European super-featherweight titles from 2017 to 2018.

== Life ==
Martin Ward is the son of a builder, and one of five children. Some of his brothers were boxers, including John Ward, who in 2010 was the Junior European champion in his weight class. He attended Sawyers Hall College, but left school at age 14. He trains at the Repton Boxing Club in Bethnal Green. In August 2012, he and his brother John Ward were shot on farmland in Essex in what Essex police called a "neighbour feud." Francis O'Donoghue was sentenced to sixteen and half years for the shooting.

== Amateur career ==
Martin Ward won the title in 2007 at the Junior European Union Championships (Cadets) of the European Union in Porto Torres in the weight class under 46 kg, just edging out Hamza Touba from Germany in points (23-22). At the Junior European Championship (Cadets) of the same year in Siofok, he earned the bronze medal. He also won a bronze at the Junior World Championship (Cadets) 2007 in Baku, where he lost in the semi-final against Elvin Isayev from Azerbaijan by points (5-18).

In 2008, he earned a silver in flyweight at the Brandenburg Cup in Frankfurt an der Oder, losing to Qualid Berlaoura from France to points (9-18). In 2009, he won another international title, the European Youth Championship (formerly Junior Championship) in Szczecin in featherweight, defeating in the final round Bunjamin Aydin from Turkey by points (4-0).

In 2010, Martin Ward became the first English featherweight champion with a points victory in the final over Ryan Farrag (18-4). Later that year he won the 1st Championship of Great Britain, where he defeated lightweight Josh Taylor from Scotland in the finals (10-9). He qualified in England for participation in the 2011 European Amateur Boxing Championships in Ankara in lightweight. He started there in lightweight, defeating Tomas Vano from Slovakia (20-6) and Ildar Vaganov from Russia (16-10) to points. His victory over Vaganov, in particular, caused a stir, but in the quarterfinals, he was defeated by Vladimir Saruhanyan from Armenia to points (15-22) and thus finished fifth.

Based on these successes, he was hopeful of being able to participate in the 2012 Summer Olympics in London. However, in the 2011 World Championships in Baku he was defeated in the second round by Robson Conceição of Brazil (20-21), after being docked two points by the referee. For this reason, he was not selected to participate in the Olympic Games in London.

=== International championships ===
Year	Place	Competition	Weight class	Notes
2007	1	Junior European Union Championships (Cadets) in Porto Torres, Italy	under 46 kg	Points win over Erdi Alfaslan, Turkey (19-12), referee stopped contest in the first round over Alessandro Cubedau, Italy and points win over Hamza Touba, Germany (23-22)
2007	3	Junior European Championships (Cadets) in Siofok	under 46 kg	Points win over Catalin Gheorghe, Romania (21-20), referee stopped contest in the second round over Mikola Buzenko, Ukraine
2007	3	Junior World Championships (Cadets) in Baku	under 46 kg	Points victory over Robert Kanalas, Hungary (21-13) and Luis Cortes, USA (21:10) and points defeat against Elvin Isajew, Azerbaijan (5-18)
2008	2	Brandenburg-Cup (Junioren) in Frankfurt an der Oder	Flyweight	Points win over Alkan Özdemir, Turkey (18-5) and Dieter Geier, Germany (15-8) and points defeat against Qualid Belaoura, France (9-18)
2008	9	European Union Championship in Cetniewo	Flyweight	Points defeat against Kerem Guren, Turkey (12-14)
2009	1	Youth European Championship in Stettin	Featherweight	Points win over David Kanalas, Hungary (9-2), Wassili Tocu, Moldova (7-2), Elvin Alijew, Azerbaijan (8-0) und Bunjamin Aydin, Turkey (4-0)
2009	1	Tammer-Turnier in Tampere	Featherweight	Points win over Mikka Lehtinen, Finland (11-3) and Joe Ham, Scotland (9-4)
2010	1	Nations Cup in Wiener Neustadt	Lightweight	Points win over Ciaran Bates, Ireland (9-6) and Janosz Török, Hungary (4-2)
2010	1	British Championships in Manchester	Lightweight	Points win over Josh Taylor, Scotland (10-9)
2011	2	62nd Strandja-Memorial in Pazardzhik	Lightweight	Points win over Vage Saruhanjan, Armenia (3-2), Ildar Waganow, Russia (+1:1) and Elvin Isajew (5-3) and points defeat against Airin Ismetow, Bulgaria (2-2+)
2011	5	Gee-Bee-Tournament in Helsinki	Lightweight	Points defeat against David Oliver Joyce, Ireland (4-16)
2011	5	European Championship in Ankara	Lightweight	Points win over Tomas Vano, Slovakia (20-6) and Ildar Waganaow (16:10) and points defeat against Vladimir Saruhanyan, Armenia (15-22)
2011	17	World Championship in Baku	Lightweight	Points win over Dragos Marin, Romania (15-7) and points defeat against Robson Conceição of Brazil (20-21)
2011	1	London International Invitational	Lightweight	Points win over Eugen Burhard (10-5) in final

=== English championships ===
Year	Place	Weight class	Notes
2009	3	Bantamweight	disqualifying loss in the semi-final against James Allen
2010	1	Featherweight	points win in the final over Ryan Farrag (18-4)

=== International matches ===
Year	Place	Weight class	Notes	
2007	Dublin	Ireland vs. England (Junior)	bis 46 kg	points win over Neil Walker (21-4)
2008	Westport	Ireland vs. England	Featherweight	Points defeat against Carl Frampton (14-14+)
2008	Sligo/Irland	Ireland vs. England	Featherweight	points defeat against Willie Carey (11-11+)
2008	Gyöngyös	Hungary vs. England	Featherweight	points win over Miklós Ráth
2008	Hajdúszoboszló	Hungary vs. England	Featherweight	referee stopped contest in the second rough against Róbert Könnyű
2010	Stockholm	Sweden vs. England	Featherweight	points win over Bashir Hassan (2-1)

== Professional career ==
He began his professional career on 8 September 2012, where he has had considerable success.

=== Ward vs. Boschiero ===
Ward fought Devis Boschiero on 30 November 2018. Boschiero went into the fight ranked at #11 by the IBF at super featherweight. The scorecards were announced as in favor of Ward, who won by split decision.

=== Ward vs. Amparan ===
On 8 February 2020, Ward beat Jesus Amparan by points in the 10th round.

=== Ward. vs Fuzile ===
On 29 May 2021, Azinga Fuzile beat Ward by technical knockout in the 8th round. Fuzile was ranked number 5 by the IBF at super featherweight.

== Professional boxing record ==
28 fights	24 wins	2 losses
By knockout	11	2
By decision	13	0
Draws	2	

No.	Result	Record	Opponent	Type	Round, time	Date	Location	Notes
28	Loss	24–2–2	(South Africa) Azinga Fuzile	TKO	7 (12), 2:55	29 May 2021	(United States) Michelob Ultra Arena, Paradise, Nevada, US	
27	Win	24–1–2	(Mexico) Jesus Amparan	PTS	10	8 Feb 2020	(United Kingdom) FlyDSA Arena, Sheffield, England	
26	Win	23–1–2	(Nicaragua) Josue Bendana	TKO	5 (8)	31 Aug 2019	(United Kingdom) The O2 Arena, London, England	
25	Win	22–1–2	(Spain) Antonio Rodriguez	PTS	6	18 May 2019	(United Kingdom) SSE Hydro, Glasgow, Scotland	
24	Win	21–1–2	(Italy) Devis Boschiero	SD	12	30 Nov 2018	Teatro Obi Hall, Florence, Italy	Won vacant WBC International Silver super-featherweight title
23	Win	20–1–2	(Tanzania) Mohammed Kambuluta	KO	2 (6), 1:37	27 Oct 2018	(United Kingdom) Copper Box Arena, London, England	
22	Loss	19–1–2	(United Kingdom) James Tennyson	TKO	5 (12), 2:24	5 May 2018	(United Kingdom) The O2 Arena, London, England	Lost European and Commonwealth super-featherweight titles; For WBA International super-featherweight title
21	Win	19–0–2	(Spain) Juli Giner	TKO	6 (12), 1:30	13 Dec 2017	(United Kingdom) York Hall, London, England	Won vacant European super-featherweight title
20	Win	18–0–2	(United Kingdom) Anthony Cacace	UD	12	15 Jul 2017	(United Kingdom) Wembley Arena, London, England	Retained British super-featherweight title; Won vacant Commonwealth super-featherweight title
19	Win	17–0–2	(United Kingdom) Maxi Hughes	UD	12	25 Mar 2017	(United Kingdom) Manchester Arena, Manchester, England	Retained British super-featherweight title
18	Win	16–0–2	(United Kingdom) Ronnie Clark	UD	12	26 Nov 2016	(United Kingdom) Wembley Arena, London, England	Retained British super-featherweight title
17	Win	15–0–2	(United Kingdom) Andy Townend	TKO	8 (12), 0:54	10 Sep 2016	(United Kingdom) The O2 Arena, London, England	Won vacant British super-featherweight title
16	Win	14–0–2	(Dominican Republic) Ruddy Encarnacion	UD	10	16 Apr 2016	(United Kingdom) First Direct Arena, Leeds, England	Retained WBC International super-featherweight title
15	Win	13–0–2	(Italy) Mario Pisanti	TKO	3 (10), 2:44	30 Jan 2016	(United Kingdom) Copper Box Arena, London, England	Retained WBC International super-featherweight title
14	Win	12–0–2	(Spain) Sergio Blanco	UD	10	1 Aug 2015	(United Kingdom) Craven Park, Hull, England	Retained WBC International super-featherweight title
13	Win	11–0–2	(United Kingdom) Maxi Hughes	RTD	5 (10), 3:00	11 Apr 2015	(United Kingdom) First Direct Arena, Leeds, England	Won vacant WBC International super-featherweight title
12	Draw	10–0–2	(United Kingdom) Maxi Hughes	MD	10	6 Dec 2014	(United Kingdom) York Hall, London, England	
11	Win	10–0–1	(Georgia (country)) Kakhaber Avetisian	TKO	8 (8), 2:57	20 Sep 2014	(United Kingdom) Wembley Arena, London, England	
10	Draw	9–0–1	(United Kingdom) Ian Bailey	TD	1 (4), 1:41	31 May 2014	(United Kingdom) Wembley Stadium, London, England	
9	Win	9–0	(Nicaragua) Reynaldo Cajina	PTS	4	21 May 2014	(United Kingdom) First Direct Arena, Leeds, England	
8	Win	8–0	(United Kingdom) Craig Woodruff	TKO	4 (6), 1:36	1 Mar 2014	(United Kingdom) Scottish Exhibition Centre, Glasgow, Scotland	
7	Win	7–0	(United Kingdom) Ben Wager	TKO	6 (6), 0:58	14 Dec 2013	(United Kingdom) ExCel Arena, London, England	
6	Win	6–0	(United Kingdom) Andy Harris	TKO	3 (6), 2:30	25 May 2013	(United Kingdom) The O2 Arena, London, England	
5	Win	5–0	(United Kingdom) Kevin Hanks	TKO	5 (6), 0:56	9 Mar 2013	(United Kingdom) Wembley Arena, London, England	
4	Win	4–0	(United Kingdom) Dougie Curran	PTS	4	8 Dec 2012	(United Kingdom) Olympia, London, England	
3	Win	3–0	(United Kingdom) Dan Carr	PTS	4	17 Nov 2012	(United Kingdom) Capital FM Arena, Nottingham, England	
2	Win	2–0	(Lithuania) Simas Volosinas	PTS	4	22 Sep 2012	(United Kingdom) Odyssey Arena, Belfast, Northern Ireland	
1	Win	1–0	(United Kingdom) Kristian Laight	PTS	4	8 Sep 2012	(United Kingdom) Alexandra Palace, London, England	
