= Maxi Hughes =

British boxer (born 1990)

Personal information
- Nickname: Maximus
- Born: 4 March 1990 (age 36) Rossington, Doncaster, South Yorkshire
- Weight: Super-featherweight; Lightweight

Boxing career
- Stance: Southpaw

Boxing record
- Total fights: 41
- Wins: 29
- Win by KO: 6
- Losses: 10
- Draws: 2

Daniel "Maxi" Hughes (born 4 March 1990) is a British professional boxer. He held the International Boxing Organisation (IBO) lightweight title from 2021 to 2023. He has also held the British lightweight title.

== Professional career ==
Hughes made his professional debut on 17 September 2010, scoring a four-round points decision (PTS) victory against Johnny Greaves at the Doncaster Dome.

After compiling a record of 8–0–1 (0 KOs), he faced Scott Cardle for the vacant Central Area lightweight title on 20 April 2013 at Winter Gardens, Blackpool. In his first championship fight Hughes suffered the first defeat of his career, losing via PTS.

After four victories, Hughes was originally scheduled to face Joseph Laryea for the vacant International Masters super-featherweight title on 12 September 2014 at iceSheffield. After Laryea refused to fight on the scheduled date, he was replaced with Kakhaber Avetisiani. Hughes emerged victorious, winning his first championship via PTS over ten rounds.

He next faced Martin Joseph Ward on 6 December 2014. In a bout that served as an eliminator for the British super-featherweight title, Hughes scored two knockdowns–which Ward claims were the result of an accidental clash of heads and a slip–en route to a majority draw (MD). Two judges scored the bout even at 95–95 and 94–94, while the third judge scored it 95–94 in favour of Ward. The pair had an immediate rematch on 11 April at the First Direct Arena in Leeds, with the vacant WBC International super-featherweight title on the line. In the fifth round Ward landed an uppercut which left Hughes with a "badly damaged nose", prompting his corner to call a halt to the contest at the end of the round, handing Hughes a fifth-round stoppage defeat via corner retirement (RTD).

After three victories in non-title fights, Hughes and Ward–now the British super-featherweight champion–fought for a third time on 25 March 2017 at the Manchester Arena. Hughes suffered the third defeat of his career, losing via twelve-round unanimous decision (UD) with the judges' scorecards reading 118–111, 116–113 and 116–112.

In his next fight he defeated Ryan Moorhead via PTS, capturing the vacant Central Area super-featherweight title on 2 September 2017 at the Doncaster Dome.

Following a technical knockout (TKO) victory against Cassius Connor in November 2017, Hughes made his second attempt at the British championship, facing Sam Bowen for the vacant title on 14 April 2018 at the King Power Stadium in Leicester. Hughes took a knee twice in the seventh round. At the beginning of the eighth, referee Victor Loughlin called a time out to allow the ringside doctor to examine an injury to Hughes' right eye. After the doctor determined Hughes' was unable to continue, Louglin called a halt to the contest, handing Hughes an eighth-round TKO loss.

He bounced back from defeat with a TKO victory against Kieron McLaren in July 2018, before suffering the fifth defeat of his career on 9 November 2019, losing via UD against Liam Walsh in a bout for the vacant WBO European lightweight title at the York Hall in London.

Three fights later he fought undefeated prospect Viktor Kotochigov for the WBC International lightweight title on 9 October 2020 at the Caesars Palace in Dubai. In what media outlets described as an "upset", Hughes scored a knockdown in the third-round en route to a UD victory with the judges' scorecards reading 97–92, 96–93 and 95–94.

In his next fight he faced Paul Hyland Jr for the vacant British lightweight title on 19 March 2021 at the Whites Hotel in Bolton. In what was considered by media outlets as a "controversial" decision, Hughes emerged victorious via eighth-round TKO. Hughes landed a punch to the body of Hyland, causing him to bend over in pain. After referee Mark Lyson initially ordered Hughes to a neutral corner, believing Hyland had touched the floor, Hyland turned his back and walked to the opposite corner. Lyson then corrected his mistake and signalled Hughes to resume the action, at which point, he ran across the ring and landed a right hand on Hyland with his back still turned. Hyland fell to the floor, prompting Lyson to begin a ten count. He made it back to his feet by the count of nine only for Lyson to call a halt to the contest, awarding Hughes the British title in his third attempt.

Following his British title victory, Hughes made his first attempt at a world championship; facing Jovanni Straffon for the lightly-regarded IBO lightweight title on 4 September 2021 at the Headingley Rugby Stadium in Leeds. Serving as part of the undercard for Josh Warrington vs. Mauricio Lara, Hughes won a wide unanimous decision with two judges scoring the bout 120–117 while the third scored it 119–109.

He successfully defended the IBO title twice in 2022, against Ryan Walsh on 26 March and Kid Galahad and 24 September, before losing it via majority decision to George Kambosos Jr at Firelake Arena in Shawnee, United States, on 22 July 2022.

On 16 March 2024 in Las Vegas, Hughes faced the undefeated William Zepeda in a WBA lightweight title eliminator. Zepeda won the fight via stoppage in four rounds.

On 14 December 2024, in Monte Carlo, Monaco, Hughes defeated Gary Cully via unanimous decision to win the WBA Continental lightweight title.

On 23 May 2025, Hughes defeated Archie Sharp by unanimous decision at Keepmoat Stadium in Doncaster to win the vacant WBC Silver lightweight title.

On 12 December 2025 at Duty Free Tennis Stadium in Dubai, United Arab Emirates, he lost via majority decision to Bakhodur Usmonov.

Hughes faced Pierce O'Leary for the vacant IBO super-lightweight title at 3Arena in Dublin on 14 March 2026, having taken the fight on two weeks notice when Mark Chamberlain withdrew due to illness. He lost when he retired on his stool at the end of the fifth round.

He faced Giorgio Visioli for the vacant WBC International Silver lightweight title at Utilita Arena in Sheffield on 24 October 2026. Hughes lost by majority decision with two of the ringside judges scoring the fight 96–94 in his opponent's favour, while the third had it a 95–95 draw.

== Professional boxing record ==
41 fights	29 wins	10 losses
By knockout	6	4
By decision	23	6
Draws	2	

No.	Result	Record	Opponent	Type	Round, time	Date	Location	Notes
41	Loss	29–10–2	Giorgio Visioli	MD	10	24 Oct 2026	Utilita Arena, Sheffield, England	For vacant WBC International Silver lightweight title
40	Loss	29–9–2	Pierce O'Leary	RTD	5 (12), 3:00	14 Mar 2026	3Arena, Dublin, Ireland	For vacant IBO light-welterweight title
39	Loss	29–8–2	Bakhodur Usmonov	MD	12	12 Dec 2025	Duty Free Tennis Stadium, Dubai, United Arab Emirates	
38	Win	29–7–2	Archie Sharp	UD	10	23 May 2025	Keepmoat Stadium, Doncaster, England	Won vacant WBC Silver lightweight title
37	Win	28–7–2	Gary Cully	UD	10	14 Dec 2024	Salle des Étoiles, Monte Carlo, Monaco	Won WBA Continental lightweight title
36	Win	27–7–2	Efstathios Antonas	TKO	6 (6), 1:02	27 Sep 2024	Park Community Arena, Sheffield, England	
35	Loss	26–7–2	William Zepeda	RTD	4 (12), 3:00	16 Mar 2024	Cosmopolitan of Las Vegas, Paradise, Nevada, U.S.	
34	Loss	26–6–2	George Kambosos Jr	MD	12	22 Jul 2023	Firelake Arena, Shawnee, U.S.	Lost IBO Lightweight title
33	Win	26–5–2	Kid Galahad	MD	12	24 Sep 2022	Motorpoint Arena, Nottingham, England	Retained IBO lightweight title
32	Win	25–5–2	Ryan Walsh	UD	12	26 Mar 2022	First Direct Arena, Leeds, England	Retained IBO lightweight title
31	Win	24–5–2	Jovanni Straffon	UD	12	4 Sep 2021	Headingley Rugby Stadium, Leeds, England	Won IBO lightweight title
30	Win	23–5–2	Paul Hyland Jr	TKO	8 (12), 1:20	19 Mar 2021	Whites Hotel, Boston, England	Won vacant British lightweight title
29	Win	22–5–2	Viktor Kotochigov	UD	10	9 Oct 2020	Caesars Palace, Dubai, United Arab Emirates	Won WBC International lightweight title
28	Win	21–5–2	Jono Carroll	UD	10	12 Aug 2020	Production Park Studios, South Kirkby, England	
27	Win	20–5–2	Kris Pilkington	PTS	4	22 Feb 2020	Doncaster Dome, Doncaster, England	
26	Loss	19–5–2	Liam Walsh	UD	10	9 Nov 2019	York Hall, London, England	For vacant WBO European lightweight title
25	Win	19–4–2	Kieron McLaren	TKO	4 (10), 2:42	6 Jul 2019	Doncaster Dome, Doncaster, England	
24	Loss	18–4–2	Sam Bowen	TKO	8 (12), 0:02	14 Apr 2018	King Power Stadium, Leicester, England	For vacant British super-featherweight title
23	Win	18–3–2	Cassius Connor	KO	4 (10), 1:55	25 Nov 2017	Doncaster Dome, Doncaster, England	
22	Win	17–3–2	Ryan Moorhead	PTS	10	2 Sep 2017	Doncaster Dome, Doncaster, England	Won vacant Central Area super-featherweight title
21	Loss	16–3–2	Martin Joseph Ward	UD	12	25 Mar 2017	Manchester Arena, Manchester, England	For British super-featherweight title
20	Win	16–2–2	Fonz Alexander	PTS	6	16 Apr 2016	First Direct Arena, Leeds, England	
19	Win	15–2–2	James Fyers	SD	10	6 Feb 2016	Europa Hotel, Belfast, Northern Ireland	
18	Win	14–2–2	Abdon Cesar	PTS	6	23 Oct 2015	Devonshire Dome, Buxton, England	
17	Loss	13–2–2	Martin Joseph Ward	RTD	5 (10), 3:00	11 Apr 2015	First Direct Arena, Leeds, England	For vacant WBC International super-featherweight title
16	Draw	13–1–2	Martin Joseph Ward	MD	10	6 Dec 2014	York Hall, London, England	
15	Win	13–1–1	Kakha Avetisiani	PTS	10	12 Sep 2014	iceSheffield, Sheffield, England	Won vacant International Masters super-featherweight title
14	Win	12–1–1	Qasim Hussain	TKO	2 (4), 1:03	9 May 2014	iceSheffield, Sheffield, England	
13	Win	11–1–1	Imre Nagy	TKO	3 (8), 1:29	7 Feb 2014	iceSheffield, Sheffield, England	
12	Win	10–1–1	Andy Harris	TD	5 (6), 1:22	13 Dec 2013	iceSheffield, Sheffield, England	Fight stopped after Harris cut from accidental head clash
11	Win	9–1–1	Michael Mooney	PTS	6	4 Oct 2013	Ponds Forge, Sheffield, England	
10	Loss	8–1–1	Scott Cardle	PTS	10	20 Apr 2013	Winter Gardens, Blackpool, England	For vacant Central Area lightweight title
9	Win	8–0–1	Andrejs Podusovs	PTS	6	30 Nov 2012	Magna Centre, Rotherham, England	
8	Win	7–0–1	Ibrar Riyaz	PTS	6	28 Sep 2012	Magna Centre, Rotherham, England	
7	Win	6–0–1	Ivan Godor	PTS	6	8 Jun 2012	Doncaster Dome, Doncaster, England	
6	Draw	5–0–1	Ronnie Clark	PTS	4	2 Mar 2012	Doncaster Dome, Doncaster, England	
5	Win	5–0	Bheki Moyo	PTS	4	10 Jul 2011	Beachcombers Club, Cleethorpes, England	
4	Win	4–0	Youssef al-Hamidi	PTS	4	4 Mar 2011	Doncaster Dome, Doncaster, England	
3	Win	3–0	Graham Fearn	PTS	4	22 Jan 2011	Doncaster Dome, Doncaster, England	
2	Win	2–0	Kristian Laight	PTS	4	3 Dec 2010	Doncaster Dome, Doncaster, England	
1	Win	1–0	Johnny Greaves	PTS	4	17 Sep 2010	Doncaster Dome, Doncaster, England	

Sporting positions
Regional boxing titles
N/A	International Masters super-featherweight champion 12 September 2014 – December 2014	N/A
Vacant Title last held by Alex Rutter	Southern Area super-featherweight champion 2 September 2017 – November 2017	Vacant Title next held by Zeeshan Khan
Preceded by Viktor Kotochigov	WBC International lightweight champion 9 October 2020 – present	Incumbent
Vacant Title last held by James Tennyson	British lightweight champion 19 March 2021 – 4 September 2021; Won world title	Vacant
Minor world boxing titles
Preceded by Jovanni Straffon	IBO lightweight champion 4 September 2021 – present	Incumbent
