= Giorgio Visioli =

English boxer (born 2003)

Personal information
- Nationality: English
- Born: 15 April 2003 (age 23)
- Height: 5 ft 8 in (173 cm)
- Weight: Super-featherweight, Lightweight

Boxing career
- Stance: Southpaw

Boxing record
- Total fights: 12
- Wins: 12
- Win by KO: 6

Giorgio Visioli (born 15 April 2003) is an English professional boxer. He has held the WBC International Silver lightweight title since October 2026 and is also a former English champion in the same weight division. As an amateur, Visioli was a two-weight England Boxing National Champion.

== Career ==
Fighting out of Repton Boxing Club, Visioli won the England Boxing National Amateur Championships at lightweight in 2022 and light-welterweight a year later.

He turned professional in August 2023, signing a promotional contract with Eddie Hearn led Matchroom Boxing.

Visioli made his pro-debut on 25 November 2023 at the 3Arena in Dublin, stopping Lee Anthony Sibley in the first round.

He claimed his seventh successive professional win, and sixth inside the distance, with a fourth round stoppage of Kane Baker at Park Community Arena in Sheffield on 19 April 2025.

Visioli defeated Elias Federico Duguet on points over eight rounds at bp pulse LIVE Arena in Birmingham on 21 June 2025.

He faced James Wilkins at Wells Fargo Center in Philadelphia, USA, on 11 October 2025. Visioli won the eight-round contest via unanimous decision.

Visioli fought Joe Howarth for the vacant English lightweight title at Indigo at The O2 in London on 17 December 2025. He won by unanimous decision to claim his first professional championship.

He made a successful first defence of his title with a unanimous decision win over Levi Giles at the Copper Box Arena in London on 21 March 2026.

Having relinquished his English championship, Visioli faced Maxi Hughes for the vacant WBC International Silver lightweight title at Utilita Arena in Sheffield on 24 October 2026. He won by majority decision with two of the ringside judges scoring the fight 96–94 in his favour, while the third had it a 95–95 draw.

== Professional boxing record ==
12 fights	12 wins	0 losses
By knockout	6	0
By decision	6	0
Draws	0	

No.	Result	Record	Opponent	Type	Round, time	Date	Location	Notes
12	Win	12–0	Maxi Hughes	MD	10	24 Oct 2026	Utilita Arena, Sheffield, England	Won vacant WBC International Silver lightweight title
11	Win	11–0	Levi Giles	UD	10	21 Mar 2026	Copper Box Arena, London, England	Retained English lightweight title
10	Win	10–0	Joe Howarth	UD	10	17 Dec 2025	Indigo at The O2, London, England	Won vacant English lightweight title
9	Win	9–0	James Wilkins	UD	8	11 Oct 2025	Wells Fargo Center, Philadelphia, U.S.	
8	Win	8–0	Elias Federico Duguet	PTS	8	21 Jun 2025	bp pulse LIVE Arena, Birmingham, England	
7	Win	7–0	Kane Baker	TKO	4	19 Apr 2025	Park Community Arena, Sheffield, England	
6	Win	6–0	Francisco Javier Lucero	TKO	5 (8)	31 Jan 2025	Indigo at The O2, London, England	
5	Win	5–0	Diego Lagos	TKO	3	28 Sep 2024	Park Community Arena, Sheffield, England	
4	Win	4–0	Tampela Maharusi	PTS	6	6 Jul 2024	Copper Box Arena, London, England	
3	Win	3–0	Sergio Odabai	KO	4	25 May 2024	First Direct Arena, Leeds, England	
2	Win	2–0	Samuel Pikire	TKO	2	27 Jan 2024	Ulster Hall, Belfast, Northern Ireland	
1	Win	1–0	Lee Anthony Sibley	TKO	1	25 Nov 2023	3Arena, Dublin, Ireland	
