= Joe Cordina =

Welsh boxer (born 1991)

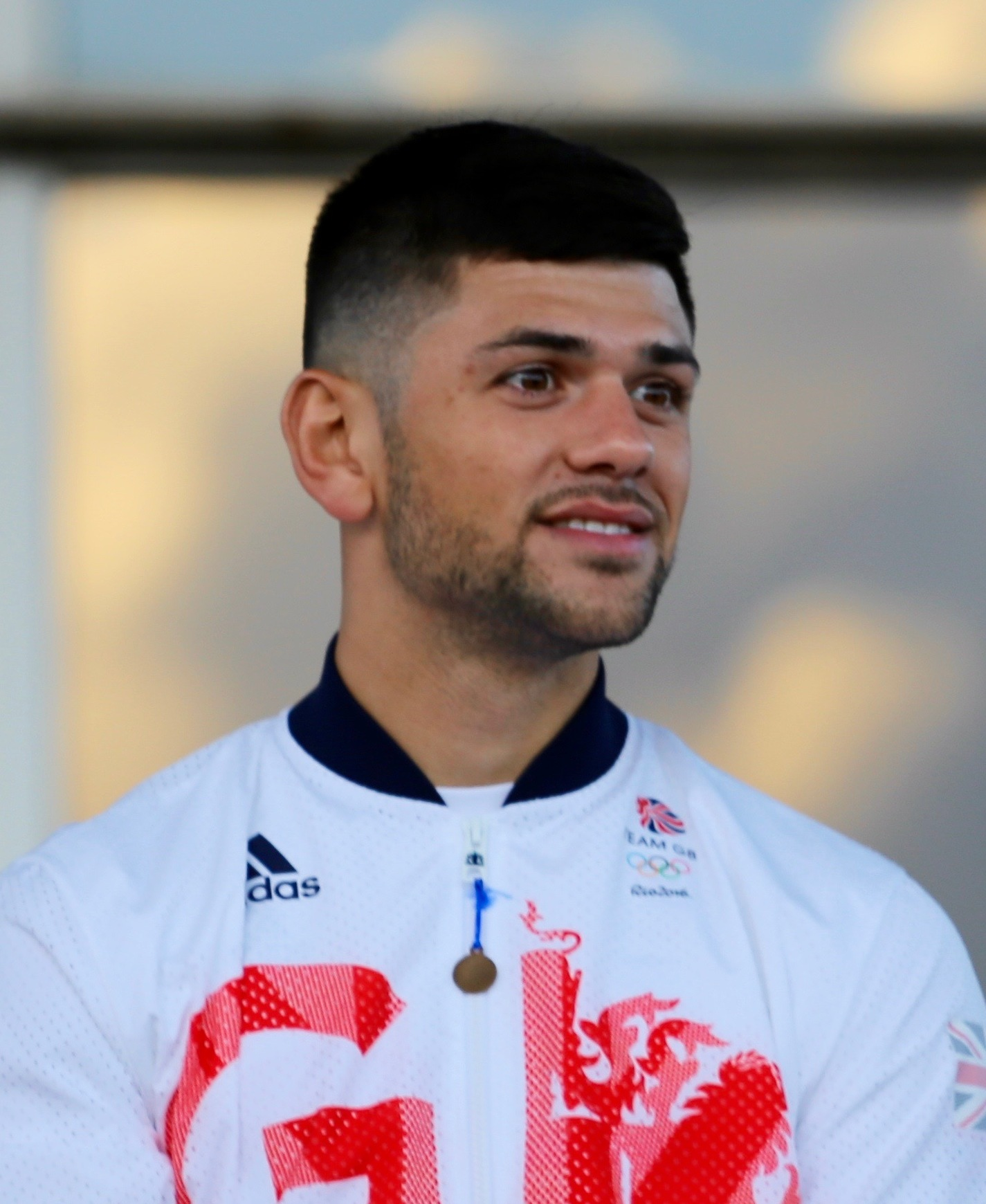
- Cordina in 2016

Personal information
- Born: 1 December 1991 (age 34) Cardiff, Wales
- Height: 5 ft 9 in (175 cm)
- Weight: Super-featherweight; Lightweight

Boxing career
- Reach: 69 in (175 cm)
- Stance: Orthodox

Boxing record
- Total fights: 20
- Wins: 19
- Win by KO: 9
- Losses: 1
Medal record
Men's amateur boxing
Representing Great Britain
European Amateur Championships
Gold medal – first place	2015 Samokov	Lightweight
Representing Wales
Commonwealth Games
Bronze medal – third place	2014 Glasgow	Lightweight
World Combat Games
Silver medal – second place	2010 Beijing	Bantamweight

Joe Cordina (born 1 December 1991) is a Welsh professional boxer. He is a two-time super-featherweight world champion, having held the International Boxing Federation (IBF) title between 2022 and 2024.

As an amateur, he won a bronze medal at the 2014 Commonwealth Games and gold at the 2015 European Championships, both in the lightweight division. He also represented Great Britain at the 2016 Summer Olympics.

== Early life ==
Cordina is of Maltese heritage.

== Amateur career ==
At the 2011 AIBA World Boxing Championships in Baku, Azerbaijan, he lost in the first round of the lightweight event to Eugen Burhard of Germany by a score of 7–13. In 2012, Cordina won a bronze medal at the European Under-22 Boxing Championships held in Russia. He defeated German boxer Artur Bril in his quarterfinal bout before losing 13–12 to Russian Maksim Shmiglev in the semi-finals. He was eliminated from the 2013 AIBA World Boxing Championships after losing his first bout in the lightweight event to Lázaro Álvarez of Cuba. At the 2012 European Boxing Olympic Qualification Tournament, he was eliminated after his bout against David Joyce of Ireland was stopped in the third round.

He represented Wales at the 2014 Commonwealth Games held in Glasgow, Scotland. Competing in the men's lightweight division, he defeated Pat McCormack of England in the first round, then Canada's David Gauthier in the round of 16. In the quarterfinals he defeated Chad Milnes of New Zealand, guaranteeing himself at least a bronze medal. He lost his semi-final to Scotland's Charlie Flynn by a split judge's decision and was eliminated from the tournament, to finish with a bronze medal.

Cordina won the lightweight gold medal at the 2015 European Amateur Boxing Championships in Samokov, Bulgaria, beating Otan Eranosyan of Georgia in the final. He was the only British boxer to win a gold medal at the event. At the 2015 AIBA World Boxing Championships held in Doha, Qatar, he reached the quarterfinals of the lightweight division by beating Kwon Chol-guk of North Korea in the round of 16, but was then eliminated after losing to Robson Conceição of Brazil.

He boxed at the 2016 European Boxing Olympic Qualification Tournament in Samsun, Turkey. He secured qualification for the lightweight event at the 2016 Summer Olympics in Rio de Janeiro, Brazil, by beating David Joyce, who had eliminated him from the 2012 Olympic qualification tournament, in the semi-finals.

== Professional career ==
=== Early career ===
Joe Cordina made his professional debut as a super-featherweight on 22 April 2017 at the Echo Arena, Liverpool, scoring a fourth-round technical knockout (TKO) victory over José Aguilar in a scheduled four round contest. Cordina next faced Sergej Vib on 29 April 2017, on the Anthony Joshua vs. Wladimir Klitschko undercard. He won the fight by a first-round technical knockout. Cordina faced Josh Thorne on 27 May 2017, in his third professional bout. He won it by a first-round stoppage, as Thorne retired at the end of the opening round. Cordina faced Jamie Speight on 1 September 2017, and extended his winning streak to four fights. Cordina faced Lester Cantillano on 28 October 2017 on the Anthony Joshua vs. Carlos Takam undercard. He won the fight on points, which was the first decision victory of his professional career. Cordina faced Lee Connelly on 13 December 2017, in his final fight of the year. He won the fight by a fourth-round technical knockout.

Cordina was booked to face Hakim Ben Ali for the vacant WBA International lightweight title on 31 March 2018, on the Anthony Joshua vs. Joseph Parker undercard. He won the fight by a third-round technical knockout.

=== British and Commonwealth champion ===
==== Cordina vs. Dodd ====
Cordina made his first regional title defense against Sean Dodd on 4 August 2018, in a fight which was simultaneously a bout for the vacant Commonwealth lightweight title as well. He won the fight by unanimous decision, with scores of 117–112, 119–109 and 120–109.

==== Cordina vs. Townend ====
Cordina faced Andy Townend on 20 April 2019 in his first Commonwealth title defense. The vacant British lightweight title was on the line as well. He won the fight by a sixth-round technical knockout.

==== Cordina vs. Gwynne ====
Cordina made the first defense of the British and Commonwealth titles on 31 August 2019. He won the fight by unanimous decision, with scores of 116–110, 116–111 and 116–110.

=== Rise up the ranks ===
Cordina was scheduled to fight Enrique Tinoco for the vacant WBA Continental super-featherweight title on 30 November 2019. He won the fight by unanimous decision, with two judges scoring the fight 98–92 in his favor, while the third judge scored it 96–94 for him.

Cordina faced Faroukh Kourbanov on 20 March 2021, following a 16-month absence from the sport. He won the fight by a close majority decision, with scores of 96–95, 96–96 and 98–93.

Cordina next faced Joshuah Hernandez on 14 August 2021. He won the fight by a first-round knockout, stopping Hernandez after just 53 seconds.

Cordina made his first WBA Continental title defense against Miko Khatchatryan on 11 December 2021, over two years after he had won it. He won the fight by unanimous decision, with two judges scoring the fight 98–92 for him, while the third judge scored it 100–90 in his favor.

=== IBF super-featherweight champion ===
==== Cordina vs. Ogawa ====
Cordina knocked out Kenichi Ogawa in the second round to become the IBF super featherweight champion on 4 June 2022, at the Motorpoint Arena in Cordina's native Cardiff, Wales.

Cordina was next scheduled to defend his belt against Shavkat Rakhimov on 5 November 2022. Due to a hand injury, Cordina had to pull out of the fight and was subsequently stripped of his IBF belt.

==== Cordina vs. Rakhimov ====
On 22 April 2023, at the Cardiff International Arena, Cordina defeated Shavkat Rahimov by split decision to regain the IBF super featherweight title.

==== Cordina vs. Vazquez ====
On 4 November 2023 in Monte Carlo, Monaco, Cordina made the first defense of his IBF super featherweight title against Edward Vazquez, with Cordina winning by majority decision.

==== Cordina vs. Cacace ====
On 18 May 2024, on the undercard of Tyson Fury vs. Oleksandr Usyk at Kingdom Arena in Riyadh, Saudi Arabia, Cordina lost his IBF super featherweight title via eighth-round TKO against Anthony Cacace.

=== Lightweight ===
==== Cancelled bout with Shakur Stevenson ====
Cordina was scheduled to challenge WBC lightweight world champion Shakur Stevenson at Kingdom Arena in Riyadh, Saudi Arabia, on 12 October 2024 on the undercard of Artur Beterbiev vs. Dmitry Bivol. On 11 September 2024, it was announced that Stevenson had suffered a hand injury and the fight was cancelled.

==== Cordina vs. Quiroz ====
On 5 July 2025, at the AO Arena in Manchester, Cordina returned from a 14-month absence to defeat Jaret Gonzalez Quiroz by unanimous decision, and claim the vacant WBO Global lightweight title.

==== Cordina vs. Flores Jr. ====
Cordina defeated Gabriel Flores Jr. via unanimous decision at Adventist Health Arena in Stockton, California, USA, on 13 December 2025.

== Personal life ==
Cordina has a daughter, born in 2015.

On 27 February 2026, Cordina was involved in an altercation with a man at a petrol station in Pentwyn, Cardiff. Cordina was charged with assault, resulting in him being denied entry to the United States, and his WBO lightweight title fight with Abdullah Mason in Cleveland on 4 July 2026 being cancelled. On 20 October 2026, Cordina was cleared of assault, as the judge found he had used necessary force to defend himself.

== Professional boxing record ==
20 fights	19 wins	1 loss
By knockout	9	1
By decision	10	0

No.	Result	Record	Opponent	Type	Round, time	Date	Location	Notes
20	Win	19–1	Gabriel Flores Jr.	UD	12	13 Dec 2025	Stockton Arena, Stockton, California, US	Won WBO International lightweight title
19	Win	18–1	Jaret Gonzalez Quiroz	UD	10	5 Jul 2025	Manchester Arena, Manchester, England	Won vacant WBO Global lightweight title
18	Loss	17–1	Anthony Cacace	TKO	8 (12), 0:39	18 May 2024	Kingdom Arena, Riyadh, Saudi Arabia	Lost IBF super-featherweight title; For IBO super-featherweight title
17	Win	17–0	Edward Vazquez	MD	12	4 Nov 2023	Casino de Monte Carlo, Monte Carlo, Monaco	Retained IBF super-featherweight title
16	Win	16–0	Shavkat Rakhimov	SD	12	22 Apr 2023	Cardiff International Arena, Cardiff, Wales	Won IBF super-featherweight title
15	Win	15–0	Kenichi Ogawa	KO	2 (12), 1:15	4 Jun 2022	Motorpoint Arena, Cardiff, Wales	Won IBF super-featherweight title
14	Win	14–0	Miko Khatchatryan	UD	10	11 Dec 2021	Echo Arena, Liverpool, England	Retained WBA Continental super-featherweight title
13	Win	13–0	Joshuah Hernandez	KO	1 (10), 0:53	14 Aug 2021	Matchroom Headquarters, Brentwood, England	
12	Win	12–0	Faroukh Kourbanov	MD	10	20 Mar 2021	The SSE Arena, London, England	
11	Win	11–0	Enrique Tinoco	UD	10	30 Nov 2019	Casino de Monte Carlo, Monte Carlo, Monaco	Won vacant WBA Continental super-featherweight title
10	Win	10–0	Gavin Gwynne	UD	12	31 Aug 2019	The O2 Arena, London, England	Retained British and Commonwealth lightweight titles
9	Win	9–0	Andy Townend	TKO	6 (12), 2:51	20 Apr 2019	The O2 Arena, London, England	Retained Commonwealth lightweight title; Won vacant British lightweight title
8	Win	8–0	Sean Dodd	UD	12	4 Aug 2018	Ice Arena Wales, Cardiff, Wales	Retained WBA International lightweight title; Won vacant Commonwealth lightweight title
7	Win	7–0	Hakim Ben Ali	TKO	3 (10), 2:41	31 Mar 2018	Principality Stadium, Cardiff, Wales	Won vacant WBA International lightweight title
6	Win	6–0	Lee Connelly	TKO	4 (8), 2:19	13 Dec 2017	York Hall, London, England	
5	Win	5–0	Lester Cantillano	PTS	4	28 Oct 2017	Principality Stadium, Cardiff, Wales	
4	Win	4–0	Jamie Speight	TKO	1 (6), 2:28	1 Sep 2017	York Hall, London, England	
3	Win	3–0	Josh Thorne	RTD	1 (4), 3:00	27 May 2017	Bramall Lane, Sheffield, England	
2	Win	2–0	Sergej Vib	TKO	1 (4), 1:59	29 Apr 2017	Wembley Stadium, London, England	
1	Win	1–0	Jose Aguilar	TKO	4 (4), 2:17	22 Apr 2017	Echo Arena, Liverpool, England	

== See also ==
- List of world super-featherweight boxing champions
- List of Welsh boxing world champions
- List of British world boxing champions

Sporting positions
Regional boxing titles
Vacant Title last held by Tommy Coyle	Commonwealth lightweight champion 4 August 2018 – 2020; Vacated	Vacant Title next held by Gavin Gwynne
Vacant Title last held by Lewis Ritson	British lightweight champion 20 April 2019 – 2020; Vacated	Vacant Title next held by James Tennyson
World boxing titles
Preceded by Kenichi Ogawa	IBF super-featherweight champion 4 June 2022 – 3 October 2022; Stripped	Vacant Title next held by Shavkat Rakhimov
Preceded by Shavkat Rakhimov	IBF super-featherweight champion 22 April 2023 – 18 May 2024	Succeeded by Anthony Cacace
