= James Tennyson =

Irish boxer (born 1993)

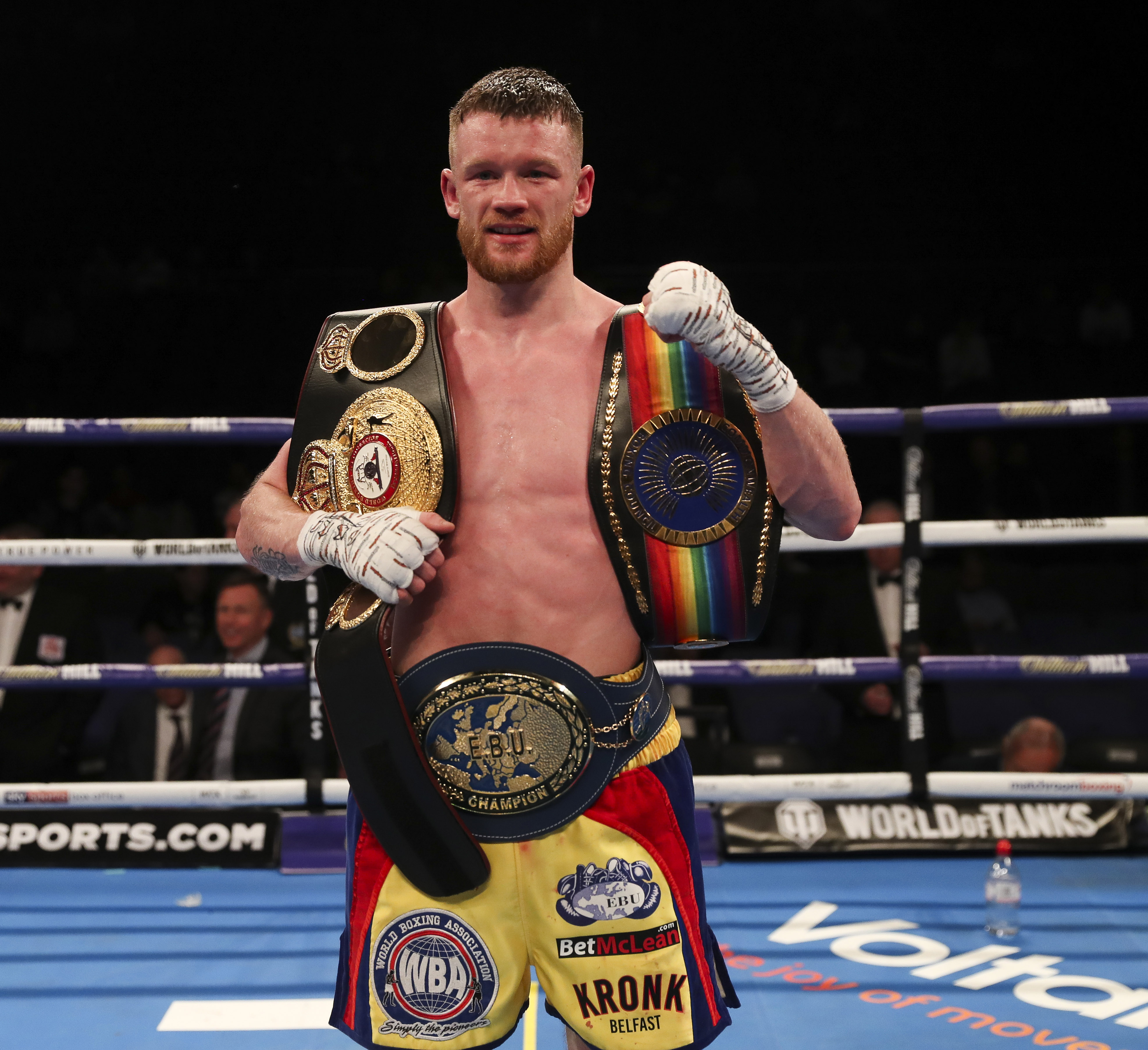

Personal information
- Nickname: The Assassin
- Nationality: Northern Irish
- Born: 6 August 1993 (age 33) Lisburn, Northern Ireland
- Height: 5 ft 8 in (173 cm)
- Weight: Featherweight; Super-featherweight; Lightweight

Boxing career
- Stance: Orthodox

Boxing record
- Total fights: 32
- Wins: 28
- Win by KO: 24
- Losses: 4

James Martin Tennyson (born 6 August 1993) is a Northern Irish former professional boxer who competed from 2012 to 2021. who challenged for the IBF super-featherweight title in 2018 and the IBO lightweight title in May 2021. At regional level he held the Commonwealth and European super-featherweight titles in 2018 and the British lightweight title from 2020 to May 2021.

== Professional career ==
=== Two-Time Irish champion ===
Tennyson is a two-time super-featherweight Irish champion. In 2013, he became the youngest ever modern era Irish champion by defeating former champion Mickey Coveney by knockout (KO) in the second round in what was only his sixth professional contest at the now demolished old St. Kevins Hall. In 2017, he won the title for the second time with a sixth-round technical knockout (TKO) over Dublin's former highly decorated amateur stand out Declan Geraghty at the Waterfront Hall in Belfast, live on BoxNation.

=== Celtic champion ===
He became Celtic featherweight champion in 2015 by way of disqualification after his opponent, Kris Hughes of Scotland, continued to hold after having already been deducted three points in the fight for persistent holding while heavily behind on points. This contest was also a final eliminator for the British featherweight title.

=== British Featherweight title challenge ===
Tennyson challenged Ryan Walsh for the British featherweight title, losing by fifth-round TKO after having been dropped twice in the fight by body shots. This contest proved to be his last at featherweight having struggled to make the weight.

=== Lightweight run ===
After a fifth round TKO loss at Super-Featherweight to then IBF Champion, Tevin Farmer in 2018 (once again via body shots), it became apparent that Tennyson was still having to drain himself significantly to make weight and it was affecting his performances in the ring. He made the smart decision to move up to Lightweight the next year. Since making the move, Tennyson had won six straight fights by knockout, including wins over the likes of Atif Shafiq, Craig Evans, Gavin Gwynne (against whom he won the vacant British Lightweight title), and previously unbeaten Josh O’Reilly, before losing to unheralded Mexican Jovanni Straffon by 1st-round TKO.

==== Tennyson vs. O'Reilly ====
On December 4, 2020, Tennyson fought Josh O'Reilly, who was ranked #7 at lightweight by the WBA, in a world title eliminator. Tennyson won the fight easily via a first round TKO.

==== Tennyson vs. Straffon ====
In his next bout, Tennyson faced Jovanni Straffon. Tennyson started the fight aggressively but Straffon retaliated with a few power punches of his own. As the pair went toe-to-toe, Straffon had more success, landing the better shots and dropping Tennyson twice before the referee decided to wave the fight off and award him the victory.

== Professional boxing record ==
32 fights	28 wins	4 losses
By knockout	24	4
By decision	3	0
By disqualification	1	0

No.	Result	Record	Opponent	Type	Round, time	Date	Location	Notes
32	Loss	28–4	Jovanni Straffon	TKO	1 (12), 2:10	1 May 2021	AO Arena, Manchester, England	For vacant IBO lightweight title
31	Win	28–3	Josh O'Reilly	TKO	1 (12), 1:37	4 Dec 2020	The SSE Arena, London, England	
30	Win	27–3	Gavin Gwynne	TKO	6 (12), 2:30	1 Aug 2020	Matchroom Fight Camp, Brentwood, England	Won vacant British lightweight title
29	Win	26–3	Craig Evans	TKO	11 (12), 2:00	23 Nov 2019	M&S Bank Arena, Liverpool, England	
28	Win	25–3	Atif Shafiq	KO	2 (10), 2:51	31 Aug 2019	The O2 Arena, London, England	Won vacant WBA International lightweight title
27	Win	24–3	Brayan Mairena	TKO	2 (6), 2:01	18 May 2019	Europa Hotel, Belfast, Northern Ireland	
26	Win	23–3	Garry Neale	KO	2 (10), 3:05	9 Feb 2019	Ulster Hall, Belfast, Northern Ireland	
25	Loss	22–3	Tevin Farmer	TKO	5 (12), 1:44	20 Oct 2018	TD Garden, Boston, Massachusetts, US	For IBF super-featherweight title
24	Win	22–2	Martin Joseph Ward	TKO	5 (12), 2:24	5 May 2018	The O2 Arena, London, England	Retained WBA International super-featherweight title; Won Commonwealth, and European super-featherweight titles
22	Win	21–2	Arnoldo Solano	KO	1 (8), 0:59	3 Feb 2018	Europa Hotel, Belfast, Northern Ireland	
22	Win	20–2	Darren Traynor	TKO	3 (10), 2:24	21 Oct 2017	The SSE Arena, Belfast, Northern Ireland	Retained WBA International super-featherweight title
21	Win	19–2	Ryan Doyle	RTD	6 (10), 3:00	10 Jun 2017	Odyssey Arena, Belfast, Northern Ireland	Won vacant WBA International super-featherweight title
20	Win	18–2	Declan Geraghty	TKO	6 (10), 2:53	10 Mar 2017	Waterfront Hall, Belfast, Northern Ireland	Won vacant BUI featherweight title
19	Win	17–2	Rafael Castillo	PTS	4	5 Nov 2016	Titanic Exhibition Centre, Belfast, Northern Ireland	
18	Loss	16–2	Ryan Walsh	TKO	5 (12), 2:34	30 Apr 2016	Copper Box Arena, London, England	For British featherweight title
17	Win	16–1	Antonio Horvatic	TKO	1 (6), 2:07	6 Feb 2016	Europa Hotel, Belfast, Northern Ireland	
16	Win	15–1	Sergejs Logins	TKO	1 (6), 1:50	14 Nov 2015	Seaplane Harbour, Tallinn, Estonia	
15	Win	14–1	Giorgi Gachechiladze	TKO	2 (8), 2:18	17 Oct 2015	Europa Hotel, Belfast, Northern Ireland	
14	Win	13–1	Krzysztof Rogowski	TKO	3 (6), 2:43	6 Jun 2015	Devenish Complex, Belfast, Northern Ireland	
13	Win	12–1	Kris Hughes	DQ	7 (10), 2:31	28 Mar 2015	Andersonstown Leisure Centre, Belfast, Northern Ireland	Won Celtic featherweight title; Hughes disqualified for persistent holding
12	Win	11–1	Simas Volosinas	TKO	2 (6), 1:23	7 Feb 2015	Devenish Complex, Belfast, Northern Ireland	
11	Win	10–1	Ian Bailey	PTS	8	10 May 2014	Devenish Complex, Belfast, Northern Ireland	
10	Win	9–1	Ignac Kassai	TKO	3 (4), 2:57	18 Apr 2014	Barba Negra Music Pub, Budapest, Hungary	
9	Loss	8–1	Pavels Senkovs	TKO	2 (6), 0:41	19 Oct 2013	Odyssey Arena, Belfast, Northern Ireland	
8	Win	8–0	Andrei Hramyka	TKO	1 (6), 2:49	28 Jun 2013	Holiday Inn, Ormeau Avenue, Belfast, Northern Ireland	
7	Win	7–0	David Kanales	KO	2 (6), 1:41	24 May 2013	Olympia, Liverpool, England	
6	Win	6–0	Mickey Coveney	TKO	2 (10), 1:41	27 Apr 2013	St Kevin's Hall, Belfast, Northern Ireland	Won vacant BUI super-featherweight title
5	Win	5–0	David Kis	TKO	1 (8), 0:57	9 Mar 2013	Fairways Hotel, Dundalk, Ireland	
4	Win	4–0	Mickey Coveney	PTS	6	7 Dec 2012	Rivals Gym, Wishaw, Scotland	
3	Win	3–0	Ignac Kassai	TKO	1 (4), 1:14	3 Nov 2012	National Basketball Arena, Dublin, Ireland	
2	Win	2–0	Tibor Meszaros	TKO	1 (4), 0:52	13 Oct 2012	Ulster Hall, Belfast, Northern Ireland	
1	Win	1–0	Fikret Remziev	TKO	4 (4), 1:57	8 Sep 2012	Holiday Inn, Ormeau Avenue, Belfast, Northern Ireland	

Sporting positions
Regional boxing titles
Vacant Title last held by Anthony Cacace	Irish super-featherweight champion 27 April 2013 – 2014	Vacant Title next held by Himself
Preceded by Kris Hughes	BBBofC Celtic featherweight champion 28 March 2015 – 2016	Vacant Title next held by Nathaniel Collins
Vacant Title last held by Himself	Irish super-featherweight champion 10 March 2017 – May 2017	Vacant
Vacant Title last held by Xu Can	WBA International super-featherweight champion 10 June 2017 – September 2018; Vacated	Vacant Title next held by John Joe Nevin
Preceded by Martin Joseph Ward	Commonwealth super-featherweight champion 5 May 2018 – September 2018; Vacated	Vacant Title next held by Zelfa Barrett
Preceded by Martin Joseph Ward	European super-featherweight champion 5 May 2018 – September 2018; Vacated	Vacant Title next held by Samir Ziani
Vacant Title last held by Devin Haney	WBA International lightweight champion 31 August 2019 – January 2021	Vacant Title next held by Artem Harutyunyan
Vacant Title last held by Joe Cordina	British lightweight champion 1 August 2020 – December 2020	Vacant Title next held by Maxi Hughes
