= Jovanni Straffon =

Mexican boxer (born 1993)

Personal information
- Other names: Impacto
- Born: Luis Jovan Velasco Straffon; 12 September 1993 (age 32) Minatitlán, Veracruz, Mexico
- Height: 5 ft 6 in (168 cm)
- Weight: Lightweight

Boxing career
- Reach: 67 in (170 cm)
- Stance: Southpaw

Boxing record
- Total fights: 34
- Wins: 26
- Win by KO: 19
- Losses: 7
- Draws: 1

Jovanni Straffon (born 12 September 1993) is a Mexican former professional boxer. He held the IBO lightweight title from 1 May 2021, when he defeated James Tennyson by first round technical knockout at Manchester Arena in Manchester, England, until 4 September 2021, when he lost in his first defense to Maxi Hughes via unanimous decision at Headingley Rugby Stadium in Leeds, England.
