= Sean Dodd =

British boxer (born 1984)

Personal information
- Nickname: Masher
- Born: 28 June 1984 (age 42) Birkenhead, Merseyside, England
- Height: 5 ft 7 in (170 cm)
- Weight: Super-featherweight; Lightweight; Light-welterweight

Boxing career
- Stance: Orthodox

Boxing record
- Total fights: 25
- Wins: 17
- Win by KO: 3
- Losses: 7
- Draws: 1

Sean "Masher" Dodd (born 28 June 1984) is a British professional boxer. He held the Commonwealth lightweight title from 2017 to 2018 and challenged twice for the British lightweight title in 2015 and 2016. Dodd fought out of the Birkenhead Venture Boxing Gym in Birkenhead, Merseyside, England

== Professional career ==
Dodd made his professional debut on 3 March 2012, scoring a fourth-round technical knockout (TKO) over Giuseppe Daparto at the Northgate Arena in Chester.

After winning his first eight fights, two by stoppage, he fought Andy Townend for the vacant Central Area super-featherweight title on 10 May 2014 at the Doncaster Dome in Doncaster. Dodd suffered the first defeat of his career via seventh-round TKO.

He bounced back from defeat with two points decision (PTS) victories against Liam Richards in March and Gary Buckland in September, before challenging Scott Cardle for the British lightweight title on 7 November 2015 at the Echo Arena in Liverpool. Dodd suffered the second defeat of his career via TKO in the twelfth and final round. At the time of the stoppage, he was ahead on two of the judges' scorecards at 107–103 and 105–104, while the third judge had it 105–104 in favour of Cardle. The pair would meet again in a rematch five months later on 2 April 2016, again at the Echo Arena. In what some described as a controversial decision, Cardle retained his title through a majority draw (MD), with two judges scoring the bout even at 114–114 while the third scored it 116–112 in favour of Cardle.

Following the draw against Cardle, he faced Pasquale Di Silvio for the vacant WBC International lightweight title on 29 May 2016 at Goodison Park in Liverpool. Dodd captured his first professional title by unanimous decision (UD) over ten rounds, with two judges scoring the bout 98–92 and the third scoring it 97–93.

He went on to successfully defend his title via split decision (SD) against Francesco Patera in October, as part of the undercard for Tony Bellew's WBC cruiserweight title defence against BJ Flores, before facing Lee Appleyard for the vacant Commonwealth lightweight title. The bout took place on 22 April 2017 at the Echo Arena. Dodd defeated Appleyard via UD with the judges' scorecards reading 117–112, 117–113 and 116–113. After a TKO win in a non-title fight against Antonio Horvatic in August, he made the first defence of his Commonwealth title a month later against Tom Stalker on 30 September 2017 at the Echo Arena. Dodd retained the title via UD over twelve rounds, with all three judges scoring the bout 118–111. His second title defence came on 21 April 2018 against Tommy Coyle at the Echo Arena. In a fight that saw the champion knocked to the canvas once in the fourth round and again in the sixth, Dodd suffered the third loss of his career, losing his Commonwealth title via sixth-round TKO after the referee called a halt to the bout to save Dodd from further punishment.

Following defeat to Coyle, Dodd faced 2016 Olympian Joe Cordina on 4 August 2018 at the Ice Arena in Cardiff, Wales. The fight would allow Dodd to challenge for the Commonwealth title once again after Coyle relinquished his claim, with Cordina's WBA International lightweight title also on the line. Dodd suffered his second consecutive defeat, losing via UD over twelve rounds with scores of 120–109, 119–109 and 117–112. He suffered a third consecutive defeat three months later against Jordan Ellison in November, before scoring two decision wins in 2019; Ibrar Riyaz by PTS in October and Tom Farrell by technical decision (TD) in November after Farrell suffered a cut from an accidental clash of heads.

On 13 May 2022, Dodd faced Harlem Eubank at Indigo at the O2 in London and was knocked out in the second round.

== Professional boxing record ==
25 fights	17 wins	7 losses
By knockout	3	4
By decision	14	3
Draws	1	

No.	Result	Record	Opponent	Type	Round, time	Date	Location	Notes
25	Loss	17–7–1	Harlem Eubank	KO	2 (10), 2:24	13 May 2022	Indigo at the O2, London, England	
24	Loss	17–6–1	Cori Gibbs	SD	3	6 Nov 2021	Echo Arena, Liverpool, England	
23	Win	17–5–1	Tom Farrell	TD	4 (10), 3:00	23 Nov 2019	Echo Arena, Liverpool, England	Majority TD after Farrell cut from accidental head clash
22	Win	16–5–1	Ibrar Riyaz	PTS	6	19 Oct 2019	Ellesmere Port Sports Village, Ellesmere Port, England	
21	Loss	15–5–1	Jordan Ellison	PTS	6	30 Nov 2018	Liverpool Olympia, Liverpool, England	
20	Loss	15–4–1	Joe Cordina	UD	12	4 Aug 2018	Ice Arena Wales, Cardiff, Wales	For WBA International and vacant Commonwealth lightweight titles
19	Loss	15–3–1	Tommy Coyle	TKO	6 (12), 2:13	21 Apr 2018	Echo Arena, Liverpool, England	Lost Commonwealth lightweight title
18	Win	15–2–1	Tom Stalker	UD	12	30 Sep 2017	Echo Arena, Liverpool, England	Retained Commonwealth lightweight title
17	Win	14–2–1	Antonio Horvatic	TKO	3 (8), 2:50	19 Aug 2017	Prenton Park, Birkenhead, England	
16	Win	13–2–1	Lee Appleyard	UD	12	22 Apr 2017	Echo Arena, Liverpool, England	Won vacant Commonwealth lightweight title
15	Win	12–2–1	Francesco Patera	SD	10	15 Oct 2016	Echo Arena, Liverpool, England	Retained WBC International lightweight title
14	Win	11–2–1	Pasquale Di Silvio	UD	10	29 May 2016	Goodison Park, Liverpool, England	Won vacant WBC International lightweight title
13	Draw	10–2–1	Scott Cardle	MD	12	2 Apr 2016	Echo Arena, Liverpool, England	For British lightweight title
12	Loss	10–2	Scott Cardle	TKO	12 (12), 1:58	7 Nov 2015	Echo Arena, Liverpool, England	For British lightweight title
11	Win	10–1	Gary Buckland	PTS	10	19 Sep 2015	Olympia Liverpool, Liverpool, England	
10	Win	9–1	Liam Richards	PTS	6	21 Mar 2015	Olympia Liverpool, Liverpool, England	
9	Loss	8–1	Andy Townend	TKO	7 (10), 2:34	10 May 2014	Doncaster Dome, Doncaster, England	For vacant Central Area super-featherweight title
8	Win	8–0	Ibrar Riyaz	PTS	6	14 Dec 2013	Liverpool Olympia, Liverpool, England	
7	Win	7–0	Youssef al-Hamidi	PTS	4	6 Jul 2013	Echo Arena, Liverpool, England	
6	Win	6–0	Lee Connelly	PTS	4	7 Jun 2013	Liverpool Olympia, Liverpool, England	
5	Win	5–0	Ross Payne	KO	6 (6), 1:30	23 Feb 2013	Echo Arena, Liverpool, England	
4	Win	4–0	Chuck Jones	PTS	4	8 Dec 2012	Liverpool Olympia, Liverpool, England	
3	Win	3–0	Billy Smith	PTS	4	13 Oct 2012	Echo Arena, Liverpool, England	
2	Win	2–0	Kristian Laight	PTS	4	19 May 2012	Aintree Equestrian Centre, Liverpool, England	
1	Win	1–0	Giuseppe Daparto	TKO	4 (4), 1:05	3 Mar 2012	Northgate Arena, Chester, England	

Sporting positions
Regional boxing titles
Vacant Title last held by Yvan Mendy	WBC International lightweight champion 29 May 2016 – March 2017	Vacant Title next held by Vage Sarukhanyan
Vacant Title last held by Luke Campbell	Commonwealth lightweight champion 22 April 2017 – 21 April 2018	Succeeded by Tommy Coyle
