= Anthony Cacace =

Irish boxer (born 1989)

Personal information
- Nicknames: The Apache; Anto
- Born: 2 February 1989 (age 37) Belfast, Northern Ireland
- Height: 5 ft 10 in (178 cm)
- Weight: Super featherweight

Boxing career
- Reach: 71 in (180 cm)
- Stance: Southpaw

Boxing record
- Total fights: 26
- Wins: 25
- Win by KO: 9
- Losses: 1

Anthony Cacace (/kəˈkɑːtʃeɪ/ kə-KAH-chay, /-tʃi/ -chee; born 2 February 1989) is a professional boxer from Northern Ireland. He is a two-time super-featherweight champion having held the World Boxing Association (WBA) title since February 2026, and previously the International Boxing Federation (IBF) title from 2024 to 2025. He also held the International Boxing Organization (IBO) super-featherweight title from 2022 to 2026.

== Professional career ==
=== Early career ===
Cacace made his professional debut on 25 February 2012, scoring a first-round technical knockout (TKO) victory over Ben Wager at the Emerald Roadhouse in Belfast, Northern Ireland. Followed three more wins—a points decision (PTS) over Kristian Laight in April; a sixth-round TKO over Mickey Coveney in July; and Aivaras Balsys by PTS in September—Cacace fought Mickey Coveney for a second time on 3 November 2012 at the National Basketball Arena in Dublin. Cacace won via first-round TKO to capture the BUI super-featherweight title. His final fight of 2012 was a PTS victory against Youssef al-Hamidi in December.

He gained decision victories over Zsolt Nagy in March and Osnel Charles in October 2013, followed by wins over Dawid Knade by TKO in September and Simas Volosinas by PTS in December 2014. He began 2015 with a PTS win over Santiago Bustos in February and a TKO win against Karoly Lakatos in June. His last fight of 2015 was against Ronnie Clark for the vacant Celtic super-featherweight title. The bout took place on 16 October at the Meadowbank Sports Centre in Edinburgh. Cacace captured the Celtic title via tenth-round TKO in a scheduled ten-round fight.

Following two fights in 2016 — a corner retirement (RTD) win against Jamie Quinn in September and a PTS win over Leonel Hernandez in November—Cacace challenged British super-featherweight champion Martin J Ward on 15 July 2017, at the Wembley Arena in London, with the vacant Commonwealth title also on the line. In what was a close competitive fight, Cacace suffered the first defeat of his professional career, losing by unanimous decision (UD) over twelve rounds, with the judges' scorecards reading 116–113, 116–114 and 115–113, all in favour of Ward.

Following his defeat to Ward, Cacace gained a PTS victory over six rounds against Reynaldo Mora in December 2017. After 14 months out of the ring, Cacace was back in action in February 2019 with an eight-round PTS win over Alan Castillo.

Cacace, as the mandatory contender, was due to challenge for the British super-featherweight title on 3 August 2019 against reigning champion Sam Bowen, however, Bowen pulled out of the fight due to a back injury. The bout was rescheduled for 30 November at Arena Birmingham. Cacace won, capturing the British title via split decision (SD), with two judges scoring the bout 115–113 to Cacace while the third scored it 115–112 to Bowen.

Cacace won the IBO super-featherweight title by defeating Michael Magnesi via split decision at Manchester Arena on 24 September 2022.

=== IBF Super featherweight champion ===
==== Cacace vs. Cordina ====
On 18 May 2024, Cacace challenged then unbeaten champion Joe Cordina for the IBF super-featherweight title on the undercard of Tyson Fury vs. Oleksandr Usyk. After dropping and badly hurting Cordina in round three, Cacace continued to pour on the pressure and ended up scoring an eighth round technical knockout win. This made him the first Irish super-featherweight champion.

==== Cacace vs. Warrington ====
Cacace defeated two-time former featherweight world champion Josh Warrington by unanimous decision at Wembley Stadium on 21 September 2024. The three ringside judges scored the fight 118–110, 117–111, 117–111 respectively in his favour. Cacace's belt was not on the line as the IBF did not recognise Warrington as a challenger due to his inactivity in the super-featherweight division, with the governing body announcing he would be stripped of the title had he lost the contest.

==== Vacating title ====
Cacace vacated the IBF title on 31 January 2025. In a social media post announcing the decision he said: "Becoming a world champion was an absolute dream and an incredibly proud moment for me. However, at this stage of my career, I only want the biggest fights possible, regardless of the belt on the line."

==== Cacace vs. Wood ====
Cacace successfully defended his IBO title by stopping Leigh Wood in the ninth round of their bout at Nottingham Arena on 10 May 2025.

=== WBA super-featherweight champion ===
==== Cacace vs. Dickens ====
Cacace challenged WBA super-featherweight champion Jazza Dickens at 3Arena in Dublin on 14 March 2026. He won by unanimous decision.

==== Cacace vs. Ball ====
Cacace is scheduled to make the first defence of his WBA super-featherweight title against former WBA featherweight champion Nick Ball at The O2 Belfast in Northern Ireland, on 19 December 2026.

== Professional boxing record ==
26 fights	25 wins	1 loss
By knockout	9	0
By decision	16	1

No.	Result	Record	Opponent	Type	Round, time	Date	Location	Notes
26	Win	25–1	Jazza Dickens	UD	12	14 Mar 2026	3Arena, Dublin, Ireland	Won WBA super-featherweight title
25	Win	24–1	Leigh Wood	TKO	9 (12), 2:15	10 May 2025	Nottingham Arena, Nottingham, England	Retained IBO super-featherweight title
24	Win	23–1	Josh Warrington	UD	12	21 Sep 2024	Wembley Stadium, London, England	Retained IBO super-featherweight title
23	Win	22–1	Joe Cordina	TKO	8 (12), 0:39	18 May 2024	Kingdom Arena, Riyadh, Saudi Arabia	Retained IBO super-featherweight title; Won IBF super-featherweight title
22	Win	21–1	Damian Wrzesiński	UD	12	27 May 2023	SSE Arena, Belfast, Northern Ireland	Retained IBO super-featherweight title
21	Win	20–1	Michael Magnesi	SD	12	24 Sep 2022	Manchester Arena, Manchester, England	Won IBO super-featherweight title
20	Win	19–1	Lyon Woodstock	UD	12	28 Aug 2021	Arena Birmingham, Birmingham, England	Retained British super-featherweight title
19	Win	18–1	Sam Bowen	SD	12	30 Nov 2019	Arena Birmingham, Birmingham, England	Won British super-featherweight title
18	Win	17–1	Alan Castillo	PTS	8	23 Feb 2019	The O2 Arena, London, England	
17	Win	16–1	Reynaldo Mora	PTS	6	21 Dec 2017	Holiday Inn, Birmingham, England	
16	Loss	15–1	Martin Joseph Ward	UD	12	15 Jul 2017	Wembley Arena, London, England	For British, and vacant Commonwealth super-featherweight titles
15	Win	15–0	Leonel Hernandez	PTS	6	19 Nov 2016	Victoria Warehouse, Manchester, England	
14	Win	14–0	Jamie Quinn	RTD	1 (6), 3:00	3 Sep 2016	Robin Park Center, Wigan, England	
13	Win	13–0	Ronnie Clark	KO	10 (10), 2:51	16 Oct 2015	Meadowbank Sports Center, Edinburgh, Scotland	Won vacant Celtic super-featherweight title
12	Win	12–0	Karoly Lakatos	TKO	3 (6), 1:39	14 Jun 2015	Hotel Aquincum, Budapest, Hungary	
11	Win	11–0	Santiago Bustos	PTS	8	28 Feb 2015	Odyssey Arena, Belfast, Northern Ireland	
10	Win	10–0	Simas Volosinas	PTS	6	6 Dec 2014	Olympia, Liverpool, England	
9	Win	9–0	Dawid Knade	TKO	2 (4), 2:09	6 Sep 2014	Titanic Quarter, Belfast, Northern Ireland	
8	Win	8–0	Osnel Charles	UD	4	12 Oct 2013	The Electric Factory, Philadelphia, Pennsylvania, US	
7	Win	7–0	Zsolt Nagy	PTS	6	9 Mar 2013	Fairways Hotel, Dundalk, Ireland	
6	Win	6–0	Youssef al-Hamidi	PTS	4	8 Dec 2012	Meadowbank Sports Centre, Edinburgh, Scotland	
5	Win	5–0	Mickey Coveney	TKO	1 (10), 3:09	3 Nov 2012	National Basketball Arena, Dublin, Ireland	Won BUI super-featherweight title
4	Win	4–0	Alvaras Balsys	PTS	8	7 Sep 2012	York Hall, London, England	
3	Win	3–0	Mickey Coveney	TKO	6 (6), 1:32	21 Jul 2012	Emerald Roadhouse, Belfast, Northern Ireland	
2	Win	2–0	Kristian Laight	PTS	4	7 Apr 2012	Grove Leisure Centre, Newark, England	
1	Win	1–0	Ben Wager	TKO	1 (4), 1:05	25 Feb 2012	Emerald Roadhouse, Belfast, Northern Ireland	

== See also ==
- List of male boxers
- List of southpaw stance boxers
- List of British world boxing champions
- List of world super-featherweight boxing champions

Sporting positions
Regional boxing titles
Vacant Title last held by Mickey Coveney	Irish super-featherweight champion 3 November 2012 – 2013; Vacated	Vacant Title next held by James Tennyson
Vacant Title last held by John Simpson	BBBofC Celtic super-featherweight champion 16 October 2015 – 30 November 2019; Won British title	Vacant Title next held by John Cooney
Preceded by Sam Bowen	British super-featherweight champion 30 November 2019 – 24 September 2022; Won IBO title	Vacant Title next held by Liam Dillon
Minor world boxing titles
Preceded by Michael Magnesi	IBO super-featherweight champion 24 September 2022 – 2026; Vacated	Vacant Title next held by Jono Carroll
Major world boxing titles
Preceded by Joe Cordina	IBF super-featherweight champion 18 May 2024 – 31 January 2025; Vacated	Vacant Title next held by Eduardo Núñez
Preceded by Jazza Dickens	WBA super-featherweight champion 14 March 2026 – present	Incumbent
