= Cameron Vuong =

English boxer (born 2002)

Personal information
- Nickname: The One
- Born: 5 August 2002 (age 23) Blyth, Northumberland, England
- Weight: Lightweight

Boxing career
- Stance: Orthodox

Boxing record
- Total fights: 10
- Wins: 9
- Win by KO: 4
- Draws: 1

Cameron Vuong (born 5 August 2002) is an English professional boxer. He currently competes in the lightweight division.

== Career ==
Vuong won the English National Amateur Elite Lightweight Championship in April 2023 and the Tri-Nations title a month later.

He made his professional debut on 7 October 2023, stopping Engel Gomez in the fourth round of their six-round contest at Sheffield Arena.

Vuong stopped Ishmael Ellis in the sixth round of a scheduled eight-round bout at Indigo at the O2 on 10 February 2024, and followed that up with a unanimous decision win against Jeff Ofori over 10 rounds at Resorts World Arena in Birmingham on 22 June 2024.

He defeated Joe Underwood Hughes on points at Wembley Arena on 18 September 2024, before returning to Resorts World Arena and overcoming Gavin Gwynne by unanimous decision on 30 November 2024.

Vuong defeated Jordan Flynn by stoppage in the seventh round at Planet Ice in Altrincham on 28 March 2025.

He fought a rematch against Gavin Gwynne at the National Exhibition Centre in Birmingham on 29 November 2025, which ended in a majority draw.

== Professional boxing record ==
10 fights	9 wins	0 losses
By knockout	4	0
By decision	5	0
Draws	1	

No.	Result	Record	Opponent	Type	Round, time	Date	Location	Notes
10	Draw	9–0–1	Gavin Gwynne	MD	10	29 Nov 2025	National Exhibition Centre, Birmingham, England	For vacant WBO Inter-Continental lightweight title
9	Win	9–0	Reuquen Cona Facundo Arce	PTS	8	6 Sep 2025	Rainton Meadows Arena, Houghton-le-Spring, England	
8	Win	8–0	Jordan Flynn	TKO	7 (10), 1:98	28 Mar 2025	Planet Ice, Altrincham, England	Won vacant WBO European lightweight title
7	Win	7–0	Gavin Gwynne	UD	10	30 Nov 2024	Resorts World Arena, Birmingham, England	
6	Win	6–0	Joe Underwood Hughes	PTS	8	18 Sep 2024	Wembley Arena, London, England	
5	Win	5–0	Jeff Ofori	UD	10	22 Jun 2024	Resorts World Arena, Birmingham, England	
4	Win	4–0	Ishmael Ellis	TKO	6 (8), 2:33	10 Feb 2024	Indigo at the O2, London, England	
3	Win	3–0	Michal Dufek	TKO	4 (6), 0:34	2 Dec 2023	Odyssey Arena, Belfast, Northern Ireland	
2	Win	2–0	John Henry Mosquera	PTS	6	11 Nov 2023	Newcastle Arena, Newcastle, England	
1	Win	1–0	Engel Gomez	TKO	4 (6), 1:19	7 Oct 2023	Sheffield Arena, Sheffield, England	
