= Gavin Gwynne =

Welsh boxer (born 1990)

Personal information
- Born: 25 April 1990 (age 36) Merthyr Tydfil, Wales
- Height: 6 ft (183 cm)
- Weight: Lightweight, Super-lightweight

Boxing career
- Stance: Orthodox

Boxing record
- Total fights: 26
- Wins: 19
- Win by KO: 5
- Losses: 5
- Draws: 2

Gavin Gwynne (born 25 April 1990) is a Welsh professional boxer who has held the European lightweight title since 2023. He previously held the British lightweight title between 2022 and 2024 and the Commonwealth lightweight title between 2021 and 2022.

== Professional career ==
Gwynne made his professional debut on 23 July 2016, scoring a four-round points decision (PTS) victory against Joe Beeden at the Rhydycar Leisure Centre in Merthyr Tydfil, Wales.

After compiling a record of 7–0 (1 KO) he defeated Henry James on 15 December 2017 at the Merthyr Leisure Centre in Merthyr Tydfil, capturing the vacant Welsh Area lightweight title via PTS over ten rounds.

Two fights later he faced Myron Mills on 27 October 2018 at the Newport Centre in Newport, Wales. In a fight which served as a final eliminator for the British lightweight title, Gwynne defeated Mills via ten-round unanimous decision (UD) with the judges' scorecards reading 97–93, 96–94, and 96–94.

Following an eight-round PTS victory against Arnoldo Solano in June 2019, Gwynne challenged British and Commonwealth lightweight champion Joe Cordina on 31 August at The O2 Arena in London. In a fight which saw both men receive a point deduction for committing fouls, Gwynne suffered the first defeat of his professional career, losing by UD with the judges' scorecards reading 116–110, 116–111, and 116–111.

He bounced back from defeat with a first-round technical knockout (TKO) victory against Abdon Cesar in November 2019, before making a second attempt at the British lightweight title, this time against former world title challenger James Tennyson on 1 August 2020 at Matchroom Sport's headquarters in Brentwood, Essex. Gwynne was hit with a two-punch combination in the sixth round, forcing him to go down on one knee. He made it back to his feet before the referee's count of ten, only to be met by a flurry of punches that prompted the referee to call a halt to the contest, awarding Tennyson a TKO victory.

Following his second defeat, Gwynne made a second attempt at the Commonwealth lightweight title, facing Seán McComb on 19 February 2021 at the Bolton Whites Hotel in Bolton. In a fight which saw Gwynne suffer a cut to the back of his head as a result of an accidental elbow strike, he dropped his opponent to the canvas in the sixth round en route to a seventh-round TKO victory after McComb turned his back on Gwynne, prompting the referee to step in and call a halt to the contest.

Gwynne made his first Commonwealth lightweight title defense against Jack O'Keeffe on 27 November 2021, at the LC2 in Swansea, Wales. He retained the title by a wide unanimous decision, with scores of 120–108, 119–109 and 118–110. Gwynne made his second title defense against the unbeaten Luke Willis on 15 April 2022, at the York Hall in Bethnal Green. Aside from being his second title defense, the vacant BBBofC British lightweight title was on the line as well. He won the fight by unanimous decision, with scores of 117–113, 118–110 and 115–112. Gavin made his first defence of the British title against Newport boxer Craig Woodruff trained by Luke Pearce. The bout was declared a draw in Bolton and a rematch was sanctioned by the BBBoC to take place in April, 2023.

Gwynne faced Cameron Vuong in Birmingham, England, on 30 November 2024. He lost by unanimous decision.

A rematch against Vuong took place at the National Exhibition Centre in Birmingham on 29 November 2025. It ended in a majority draw.

In his next fight, Gwynne faced the previously undefeated Khaleel Majid at Co-op Live in Manchester for the vacant WBA super-lightweight International title on 9 May 2026. He won via majority decision.

Gwynne fought Zelfa Barrett for the vacant WBA Intercontinental lightweight title at Wembley Arena in London on 14 November 2026. He lost by technical knockout in the fifth round.

== Professional boxing record ==
26 fights	19 wins	5 losses
By knockout	5	3
By decision	14	2
Draws	2	

No.	Result	Record	Opponent	Type	Round, time	Date	Location	Notes
26	Loss	19–5–2	Zelfa Barrett	TKO	5 (12), 2:33	14 Nov 2026	Wembley Arena, London, England	For vacant WBA Intercontinental lightweight title
25	Win	19–4–2	Khaleel Majid	MD	10	9 May 2026	Co-op Live, Manchester, England	Won vacant WBA super-lightweight International title
24	Draw	18–4–2	Cameron Vuong	MD	12	29 Nov 2025	National Exhibition Centre, Birmingham, England	
23	Win	18–4–1	Owen Durnan	PTS	6	16 Aug 2025	Neath Sports Centre, Neath, Wales	
22	Loss	17–4–1	Cameron Vuong	UD	10	30 Nov 2024	Resorts World Arena, Birmingham, England	
21	Loss	17–3–1	Mark Chamberlain	TKO	4 (10), 2:46	8 Mar 2024	Kingdom Arena, Riyadh, Saudi Arabia	For vacant WBA Inter-continental lightweight title
20	Win	17–2–1	Emiliano Marsili	RTD	8 (12), 3:00	1 Dec 2023	York Hall, Bethnal Green, England	Won vacant European lightweight title
19	Win	16–2–1	Craig Woodruff	TKO	5 (12), 2:02	22 Apr 2023	Motorpoint Arena, Cardiff, Wales	Retained British lightweight title
18	Draw	15–2–1	Craig Woodruff	MD	12	17 Sep 2022	Bolton Whites Hotel, Bolton, England	Retained British lightweight title
17	Win	15–2	Luke Willis	UD	12	15 Apr 2022	York Hall, Bethnal Green, England	Retained Commonwealth lightweight title; Won vacant British lightweight title
16	Win	14–2	Jack O'Keeffe	UD	12	27 Nov 2021	LC2, Swansea, Wales	Retained Commonwealth lightweight title
15	Win	13–2	Seán McComb	TKO	7 (12), 2:09	19 Feb 2021	Bolton Whites Hotel, Bolton, England	Won vacant Commonwealth lightweight title
14	Loss	12–2	James Tennyson	TKO	6 (12), 2:30	1 Aug 2020	Matchroom Headquarters, Brentwood, England	For vacant British lightweight title
13	Win	12–1	Abdon Cesar	TKO	1 (8), 1:51	30 Nov 2019	Active Living Centre, Pontypool, Wales	
12	Loss	11–1	Joe Cordina	UD	12	31 Aug 2019	The O2 Arena, London, England	For British and Commonwealth lightweight titles
11	Win	11–0	Arnoldo Solano	PTS	8	29 Jun 2019	Merthyr Leisure Centre, Merthyr Tydfil, Wales	
10	Win	10–0	Myron Mills	UD	10	27 Oct 2018	Newport Centre, Newport, Wales	
9	Win	9–0	Dean Evans	PTS	6	14 Apr 2018	Ice Arena Wales, Cardiff, Wales	
8	Win	8–0	Henry Janes	PTS	10	15 Dec 2017	Merthyr Leisure Centre, Merthyr Tydfil, Wales	Won vacant Welsh Area lightweight title
7	Win	7–0	Fonz Alexander	PTS	8	14 Oct 2017	Merthyr Leisure Centre, Merthyr Tydfil, Wales	
6	Win	6–0	Ibrar Riyaz	PTS	4	26 May 2017	Motorpoint Arena, Cardiff, Wales	
5	Win	5–0	Adam Bannister	PTS	4	22 Apr 2017	Leisure Centre, Ebbw Vale, Wales	
4	Win	4–0	Jamie Quinn	PTS	6	25 Mar 2017	Rhydycar Leisure Centre, Merthyr Tydfil, Wales	
3	Win	3–0	Andy Harris	PTS	4	21 Nov 2016	Sheraton Grand Park Hotel, London, England	
2	Win	2–0	Yaddollah Ghasemi	TKO	4 (4), 2:53	8 Oct 2016	Rhondda Fach Sports Centre, Tylorstown, Wales	
1	Win	1–0	Joe Beeden	PTS	4	23 Jul 2016	Rhydycar Leisure Centre, Merthyr Tydfil, Wales	

Sporting positions
Regional boxing titles
Vacant Title last held by Craig Woodruff	Welsh Area lightweight champion 15 December 2017 – 2018	Vacant
Vacant Title last held by Joe Cordina	Commonwealth lightweight champion 19 February 2021 – present	Incumbent
