= Vasiliy Lomachenko vs. Luke Campbell =

Boxing match

- Date: 31 August 2019
- Venue: The O2 Arena, Greenwich, London
- Title(s) on the line: WBC, WBA, WBO, and The Ring Lightweight Championship

Tale of the tape
Boxer	(Ukraine) Vasiliy Lomachenko	(United Kingdom) Luke Campbell
Nickname	"Loma"	"Cool Hand"
Hometown	Bilhorod-Dnistrovskyi, Odesa Oblast, Ukraine	Kingston upon Hull, East Riding of Yorkshire, UK
Purse	$3,500,000	
Pre-fight record	13–1 (10 KO)	20–2 (16 KO)
Age	31 years, 6 months	31 years, 11 months
Height	5 ft 7 in (170 cm)	5 ft 9 in (175 cm)
Weight	134 1/2 lb (61 kg)	134 1/2 lb (61 kg)
Style	Southpaw	Southpaw
Recognition	WBA, WBO and The Ring; Lightweight Champion; The Ring No. 1 ranked pound-for-pound fighter TBRB; No. 1 Ranked Lightweight; 3-division world champion	WBC; No. 1 Ranked Lightweight; WBA; No. 5 Ranked Lightweight; WBO; No. 11 Ranked Lightweight; The Ring; No. 2 Ranked Lightweight; TBRB; No. 7 Ranked Lightweight

Result
- Lomachenko defeated Campbell via Unanimous Decision

Vasiliy Lomachenko vs. Luke Campbell was a professional boxing match contested on 31 August 2019, for the WBC, WBA, WBO and The Ring lightweight championship.

== Background ==
In May 2019, after Mikey Garcia vacated the WBC lightweight title, Lomachenko (13–1, 10 KOs) petitioned for a vacant title shot. In normal circumstances, due to Lomachenko holding the WBO and WBA world title, meant he would not receive a ranking from the other organisations. The WBC however accepted the request, in what was a controversial move. Next in line to challenge for the WBC title was 31 year old British boxer Luke Campbell (20–2, 16 KOs). Lomachenko's aim was to unify the lightweight division. On 7 May, the WBC ordered the bout. Early talks between Eddie Hearn and Bob Arum suggested the fight was going to take place in England. Arum said, “I’ve already talked to Eddie Hearn and he’s looking for an appropriate venue in the UK.” It was something Lomachenko always wanted to do since winning his Olympic Gold medal in 2012. Part of the agreement for the fight taking place in the UK it had to be broadcast on ESPN in the US. Hearn believed the decision to allow Lomachenko to fight for the vacant WBC title was wrong. Hearn thought his boxer Devin Haney, who was ranked #3, should have been ordered instead. As of mid June, Lomachenko had agreed terms with Hearn waiting on Campbell to agree his terms.

On 23 June, the WBC cancelled the purse bid, anticipating an announcement, after it was reported that all terms were agreed. According to Hearn, on 30 June, all negotiations were complete and Campbell was due to receive the final contract, with the fight taking place on 31 August 2019. A week later, there was still no official announcement. Speaking to iFL TV, Arum said it was requested by Hearn, to allow Matchroom to announce the fight. On 20 July, the fight was officially announced, to take place at the O2 Arena in London, which would air on Sky Sports Box Office in the UK. The fight was Campbell's second attempt at a world title, having lost to Jorge Linares via split decision in September 2017. Lomachenko would praise Campbell in the build up, saying "He has a big reach and he has a high boxing IQ, maybe for me it will be a big challenge." Campbell would say that "I've never shied away from a challenge, we're the best two in the division and you're going to see one hell of a fight."

On 6 August, Bob Arum voiced his concern in not trusted the British board, on the back of Dillian Whyte's failed drug test after defeating Óscar Rivas. Arum's issue stemmed from the fact the board did not notify Rivas's team about the problem with one of the tests He told BBC Sport, "Ordinarily I wouldn't be concerned but ask me if I am and damn right I am because I don't trust the British board." The event sold out within weeks. Lomachenko weighed 134.5 pounds, which was consistent with his last three fight at the weight. Campbell weighed 134.25 pounds.

Lomachenko was a 1/18 favourite to win.

== The fights ==
=== Undercard ===
The first of the PPV bouts saw Savannah Marshall score a 5th round TKO victory over Daniele Bastieri, before Joe Cordina retained British and Commonwealth lightweight titles against fellow Welshman Gavin Gwynne and Joshua Buatsi stopped Ryan Ford.

=== Edwards vs Martinez ===
The first of two world title bouts on the card saw Charlie Edwards defended his WBC flyweight title against the top ranked contender Julio Cesar Martínez.

==== The fight ====
Martinez made an aggressive start and in the third round Edwards was forced to take a knee after a number of body shots. While his left glove and knee were touching the canvas, Martinez landed a shot to the ribs that prevented Edwards from beating the count. The replays of the incident prompted a chorus of boos from the crowd.

==== Aftermath ====
Martinez was initially declared the KO winner and the new WBC flyweight world champion. However, Edwards's promoter Eddie Hearn, instantly appealed to the WBC, speaking in the aftermath would describe the knockout shot as "so late it was next week". Less than 10 minutes after the fight ended, WBC president Mauricio Sulaiman ruled the bout a no contest, meaning that Edwards retained his title.

Preceded by vs. Angel Moreno	Charlie Edwards's bouts 31 August 2019	Succeeded by vs. Kyle Williams
Preceded by vs. Andrew Selby	Julio Cesar Martínez's bouts 31 August 2019	Succeeded by vs. Cristofer Rosales

=== Povetkin vs Fury ===
In the chief support, former world heavyweight title challengers Alexander Povetkin (WBC:7th WBA:10th) & Hughie Fury (WBC:22nd IBF:12th) faced each other for the WBA International title.

==== The fight ====
Fury would start the stronger making use of his 5-inch reach advantage, however as the bout wore on Povetkin would find ways of landing with his right hand and by the ninth round Fury was cut near his left eye. Povetkin did tire late on but Fury could take advantage. At the end of 12 rounds Povetkin won a unanimous decision with all three judges scoring the bout 117–111 in the Russian favour.

Preceded by vs. Anthony Joshua	Alexander Povetkin's bouts 31 August 2019	Succeeded by vs. Michael Hunter
Preceded by vs. Samuel Peter	Hughie Fury's bouts 31 August 2019	Succeeded by vs. Pavel Sour

=== Main Event ===
In front of a sold-out crowd of over 18,000 in attendance, Lomachenko retained the WBA, WBO and The Ring lightweight titles, and gained the vacant WBC lightweight title by defeating Campbell by unanimous decision. He was in fine form, winning by 119–108 on two judges' cards, and 118–109 on the other. Despite being a heavy underdog, Campbell started well and took the first round. Lomachenko soon found his groove, however, and almost had Campbell down in the 5th round but for the bell. Campbell took more shots in round 6, but fired back and the fight remained competitive. Lomachenko knocked down Campbell in the 11th round after a series of body shots followed by a stiff jab. Campbell beat the count, and ultimately survived the round and the fight, receiving credit after the bout for his resilience. According to CompuBox, Lomachenko landed 211 of 527 punches thrown (40%) and Campbell landed 131 of his 420 thrown (31.2%).

== Aftermath ==
Speaking in ring after the bout Lomachenko praised Campbell saying "He has big amateur experience, he's a smart fighter, a technical fighter and you saw his reach so of course it was hard for me. He gave me a good experience and a good fight. I want a unification fight for the four belts." Campbell likewise would praise Lomachenko saying "He is so good, he adapts to any plans, tonight was not the jackpot but my time will come." He would later describe the bout as first time he ever been "truly beaten".

Former world champion Carl Frampton, speaking as part of the BBC Radio 5 Live commentary team, was among those impressed by Campbell effort saying "I never expected that. It was down to Luke Campbell who showed such skill alongside grit and determination. His stock has risen dramatically tonight even though he is the loser. I think Lomachenko underplayed how hard that was. I think it's the toughest fight he has had as a professional."

The event sold approximately 205,000 PPV's in the UK. Lomachenko had a $3.5 million guaranteed purse. Campbell took a slightly lower purse, which allowed the fight to take place in his home country,

== Undercard ==
Confirmed bouts:

Winner	Loser	Weight division/title belt(s) disputed	Result
(Russia) Alexander Povetkin	(United Kingdom) Hughie Fury	vacant WBA International heavyweight title	Unanimous decision
(United Kingdom) Charlie Edwards	(Mexico) Julio Cesar Martínez	WBC World Flyweight title	No contest
(United Kingdom) Joshua Buatsi	(Canada) Ryan Ford	WBA International light heavyweight title	7th round KO
(United Kingdom) Joe Cordina	(United Kingdom) Gavin Gwynne	British and Commonwealth lightweight title	Unanimous decision
(United Kingdom) Savannah Marshall	(Brazil) Daniele Bastieri	Super middleweight (8 rounds)	5th round TKO
Preliminary bouts
(United Kingdom) James Tennyson	(United Kingdom) Atif Shafiq	vacant WBA International lightweight title	2nd round KO
(United Kingdom) Martin Joseph Ward	(Nicaragua) Josue Bendana	Lightweight (8 rounds)	5th round TKO
(United Kingdom) Connor Coghill	(United Kingdom) Dean Jones	Super featherweight (4 rounds)	Points decision

== Broadcasting ==
Country	Broadcaster
Czech Republic	Sport 2
Ukraine	Inter
United Kingdom	Sky Sports
United States	ESPN

Preceded by vs. Anthony Crolla	Vasiliy Lomachenko's bouts 31 August 2019	Succeeded by vs. Teófimo López
Preceded by vs. Adrian Yung	Luke Campbell's bouts 31 August 2019	Succeeded by vs. Ryan Garcia
