= Billy Schwer =

English boxer

Personal information
- Born: Billy Schwer; 12 April 1969 (age 57) Luton, England
- Weight: light-welterweight

Boxing career
- Stance: Orthodox

Boxing record
- Total fights: 45
- Wins: 39
- Win by KO: 30
- Losses: 6
- Draws: 0

William Schwer (born 12 April 1969 in Luton, England), known as Billy Schwer, is a former professional boxer.

For the majority of his professional career, Schwer fought in the lightweight division but also competed in the light welterweight division. He is a former British, Commonwealth and European lightweight and the IBO World Light Welter-weight title Champion.

== Background ==
Schwer's father was the Irish amateur title holder in the 1960s before he emigrated to England.

=== Amateur career ===
Schwer attended Challney High School for Boys (Luton). A former national schoolboy title holder, he represented England at the youth and senior levels. At the 1990 ABA National Championships held at the Royal Albert Hall, London, Schwer represent the Luton Irish Boxing Club and was runner up to Patrick 'Blueboy' Gallagher, in the lightweight division.

== Professional career ==
Schwer was trained by Jack Lindsay and fought out of Luton. He was a popular fighter and attracted a large local following. He had his first professional fight in October 1990. His first fight took place at the York Hall, Bethnal Green, London, where he beat Frenchman Pierre Conan with a first round knockout.

He fought a total of 45 bouts, between 1990 and 2001, winning 39 leading to winning British, Commonwealth, European and World Titles.

He retired from boxing in 2001, after losing his World Title to Pablo Daniel Sarmiento.

=== Title fights ===
==== British and Commonwealth Feather weight title ====
Schwer's first title fight came in 1992 against Carl Crook.

== See also ==
- List of British lightweight boxing champions

== Post-Boxing Career ==
After retiring from Boxing in 2001, Schwer became a speaker, author and performance coach.
