= Vladimir Saruhanyan =

Armenian boxer

Medal record

Men's Boxing

Representing Armenia

European Championships
Bronze medal – third place	2011 Ankara	Lightweight

Vladimir Saruhanyan (Armenian: Վլադիմիր Սարուխանյան) is an Armenian amateur boxer.

Saruhanyan won a bronze medal at the 2011 European Amateur Boxing Championships in the lightweight division.
