= Andreas Schwer =

German manager (born 1966)

Andreas Schwer (born 1966) is a German manager. He was CEO of the state arms and military manufacturer SAMI of Saudi Arabia from 2018 to 2020.

== Professional career ==
Schwer studied aerospace engineering at the University of Stuttgart from 1987 to 1992. In 1995 he earned a Ph. D. in Numerical Satellite Design Optimization with a research project at ESA. In 1999 he completed his master's in systems engineering at the Universiteit Delft.

Schwer worked for Airbus in the armaments and aerospace division from 1995 to 2004, moving to the helicopter division in 2005. In 2008 he was appointed CTO and Executive Vice-president at American crane manufacturer The Manitowoc Company, where he became managing director in 2011. In 2012, Schwer joined the executive board of Rheinmetall, where he was appointed CEO of Combat System Division in 2015 and Chairman & President and CEO in 2016. During his time at Rheinmetall, Schwer supported the export of combat tanks to Turkey. The German government stopped and banned all arms exports to the regime in Riyadh in 2018 because of the murder of journalist Jamal Khashoggi. In 2018, Schwer moved to SAMI as CEO.

Under the co-responsibility of Schwer SAMI intended to take over the South African armaments company Denel; including its shares in a joint venture with Rheinmetall. Rheinmetall production facilities in South Africa and Italy continue to supply SAMI with ammunition. According to German magazine Stern this deal amounts to more than 100 million euros per year.

The hiring of Schwer as a top manager by SAMI was part of a "small inquiry" (Kleine Anfrage) of the member of Bundestag Sevim Dağdelen, Christine Buchholz, Klaus Ernst, Heike Hänsel, Andrej Hunko, Zaklin Nastic, Eva-Maria Schreiber, Kirsten Tackmann, Kathrin Vogler, Hubertus Zdebel and the parliamentary party Die Linke entitled "The Promised Export Stop of German Armaments to Saudi Arabia and the Role of Rheinmetall" in January 2019.

Schwer is chairman of the Australian metal 3D-printer manufacturer Titomic since July 2020.

Dr Schwer was appointed Group CEO of EOS (Electro Optic Systems) in August 2022.

== Private life ==
Andreas Schwer lived in Meersburg on Bodensee until 2017. In Meersburg he was involved in as an organist in the Catholic parish of Mariä Heimsuchung.
