= Bedworth Civic Hall =

Arts centre in Bedworth, Warwickshire, England

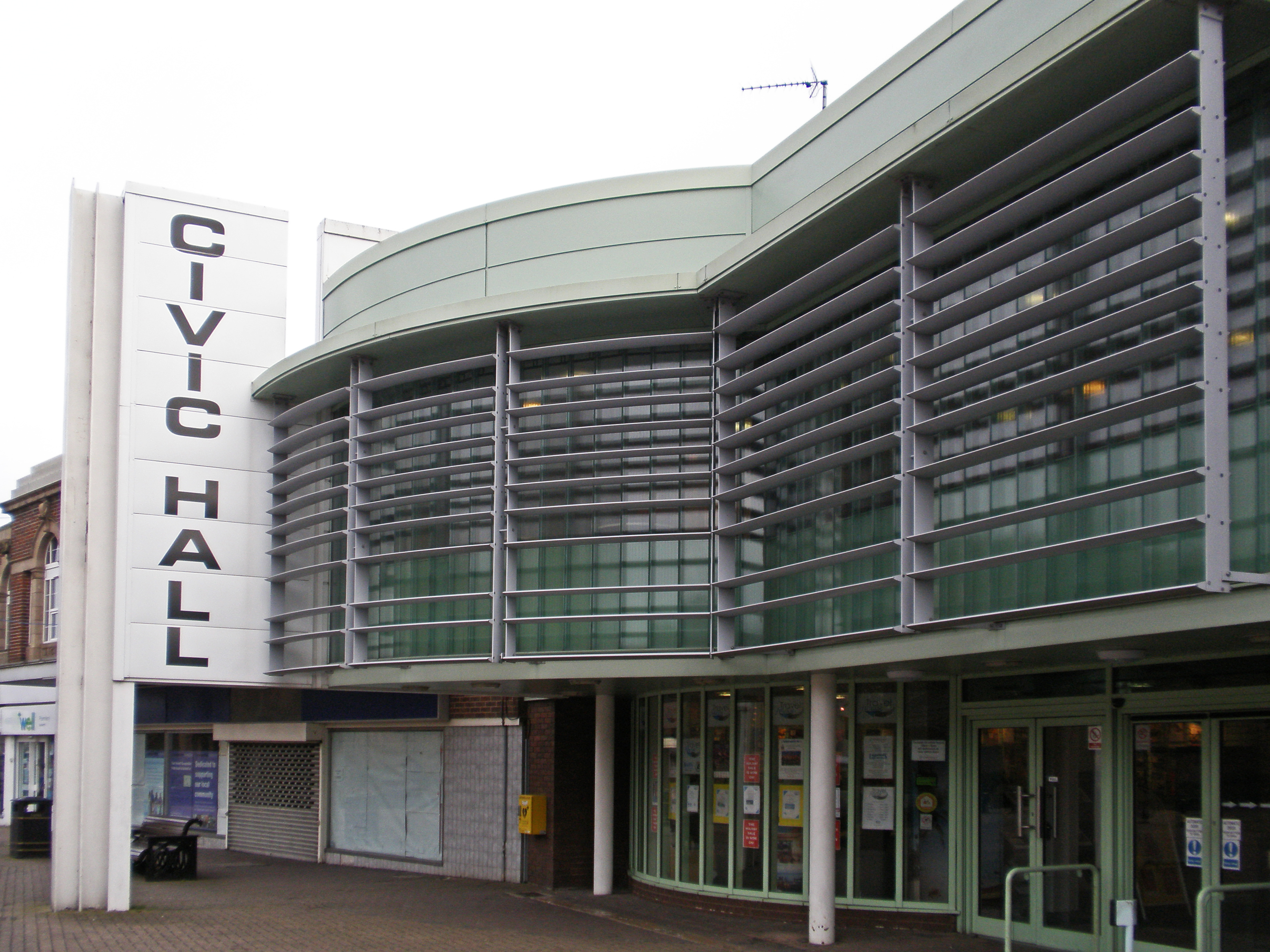
- Hall entrance
- Interactive map of Bedworth Civic Hall
- Address: High Street; Bedworth; England
- Coordinates: 52.478773°N 1.471775°W
- Owner: Bedworth Civic Hall Charitable Incorporated Organisation (CIO)
- Capacity: 763
- Current use: Theatre

Construction
- Opened: September 1973
- Renovated: 2004
- Closed: October 2022
- Reopened: July 2024

Website
- https://www.bedworthcivichall.co.uk/

The Bedworth Civic Hall is a multi-purpose entertainment venue in the town centre of Bedworth, Warwickshire, England.

The centrepiece of the venue is a 763-seat hall. Other facilities include a gallery, meeting rooms a small hall, and two bars (one downstairs and one upstairs in the piano lounge, which is host to regular comedy nights).

Box office is open every Saturday 11am to 2pm, and when shows are on.

== History ==
The facility was opened in September 1973. It was owned and managed by Nuneaton and Bedworth Borough Council. In 2004, the hall underwent a major refurbishment costing £1.4 million. In 2021, the hall was used as a vaccination centre during the COVID-19 pandemic. In October 2022 the borough council announced that the Civic Hall would close permanently, citing the cost of maintaining the venue, but they stated that it would be redeveloped into a new theatre and library. However in March 2024 it was announced that it would be reopened in phases, after the council transferred the running of the venue to a community-driven organisation, Bedworth Civic Hall Charitable Incorporated Organisation (CIO) on a 20 year lease. It was reopened on 19 July 2024.

== Notable acts ==
In 1990, the opera singer Luciano Pavarotti sang at the Civil Hall as a rehearsal with the City of Birmingham Symphony Orchestra.

Other notable acts to have performed at the venue include Lenny Henry, Billy Ocean, Pam Ayres, Billy Fury, AC/DC, Ken Dodd, Morecambe and Wise, the Drifters, Al Murray, Larry Grayson, Norman Wisdom, Jimmy Tarbuck, Martha Reeves, Elkie Brooks, and Cilla Black. It has also served as a venue for the television series Dickinson's Real Deal and Question Time.
