= Ryan Walsh =

English boxer (born 1986)

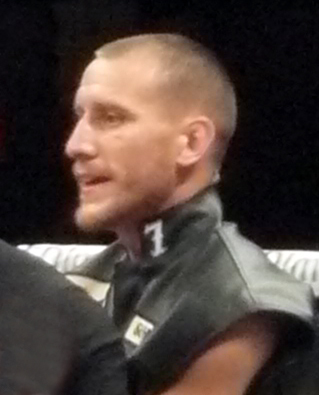
- Walsh in 2016

Personal information
- Nationality: British
- Born: 18 May 1986 (age 40) Rochdale, Greater Manchester, England
- Height: 5 ft 6 1/2 in (169 cm)
- Weight: Super-bantamweight; Featherweight

Boxing career
- Stance: Orthodox

Boxing record
- Total fights: 36
- Wins: 29
- Win by KO: 13
- Losses: 5
- Draws: 2

Ryan Walsh (born 18 May 1986) is an English professional boxer.

== Personal life ==
Ryan's twin brother Liam and older brother Michael are also professional boxers, and in 2015 Ryan and Liam became the first twins to hold British titles at the same time.

== Professional career ==
Raised in Rochdale and based in Cromer, Norfolk, Walsh made his professional debut on 2 February 2008 with a first-round knockout of Riaz Durgahed. By April 2011 he had won his first twelve fights, and on 21 October scored a unanimous decision (UD) over Liam Richards to win the English super-bantamweight title.

In October 2013, Walsh challenged Lee Selby for the British and Commonwealth featherweight titles. The fight went the full twelve-round distance, with Selby winning a clear UD to hand Walsh his first loss. Two years later, on 26 September 2015, Walsh faced Samir Mouneimne for the now-vacant British featherweight title. The fight went the distance, with Walsh scoring a split decision to become British champion.

Walsh was set to make his first defence of the title in January 2016 against Ryan Doyle, but instead faced the undefeated Darren Traynor, stopping the challenger in five rounds.

On 28 June 2019, Walsh defended his British featherweight belt against Lewis Paulin. The fight was considered a significant step up in quality for Paulin. Walsh was the better man for most of the fight, although Paulin had a couple of rounds where he boxed well and took the fight to Walsh. In the end, two judges scored the fight in favor of Walsh, 117-111 and 115–114, while the third judge gave the fight 115–113 to Paulin, thus awarding the split-decision victory to Walsh to retain his British featherweight belt.

In his next fight, Walsh fought Harion Socarras as a part of the quarter-final of The Golden Contract featherweight tournament. After a close start, a brawl started in the fifth round, in which Walsh managed to score a knockdown over Socarras. In the ninth round, Walsh sent Socarras to the ropes with a flurry of shots, which prompted the referee to stop the fight.

In the semi-final, Walsh faced Tyrone McCullagh. McCullagh started the fight strong, and was winning for the first half of the fight. However, Walsh managed to drop McCullagh twice in the remainder of the fight, even coming close to stopping him in the ninth. McCullagh made it to the final bell, but Walsh was announced the winner via unanimous decision, earning him a ticket to The Golden Contract tournament final.

Walsh challenged British and Commonwealth lightweight champion Sam Noakes at Wembley Arena in London on 7 December 2024. He lost by unanimous decision.

== Professional boxing record ==
36 fights	29 wins	5 losses
By knockout	13	0
By decision	16	5
Draws	2	

No.	Result	Record	Opponent	Type	Round, time	Date	Location	Notes
36	Loss	29–5–2	Sam Noakes	UD	12	7 Dec 2024	Wembley Arena, London, England	For the British and Commonwealth lightweight titles
35	Win	29–4–2	Reece Mould	TKO	1 (10), 1:58	27 Sep 2024	Park Community Arena, Sheffield, England	
34	Win	28–4–2	Rustem Fatkhullin	PTS	4	10 Dec 2023	Holiday Inn, Norwich Airport, Norwich, England	
33	Loss	27–4–2	Maxi Hughes	UD	12	26 Mar 2022	First Direct Arena, Leeds, England	For IBO lightweight title
32	Win	27–3–2	Ronnie Clark	PTS	6	18 Dec 2021	Norfolk Showground, Norwich, England	
31	Loss	26–3–2	Jazza Dickens	UD	10	2 Dec 2020	Production Park Studios, South Kirkby, England	For WBO European featherweight title; The Golden Contract: Featherweight – final
30	Win	26–2–2	Tyrone McCullagh	UD	10	21 Feb 2020	York Hall, London, England	The Golden Contract: Featherweight – semi-final
29	Win	25–2–2	Hairon Socarras	TKO	9 (10), 2:39	4 Oct 2019	York Hall, London, England	The Golden Contract: Featherweight – quarter-final
28	Win	24–2–2	Lewis Paulin	SD	12	28 Jun 2019	York Hall, London, England	Retained British featherweight title
27	Win	23–2–2	Reece Bellotti	SD	12	22 Dec 2018	The O2 Arena, London, England	Retained British featherweight title
26	Draw	22–2–2	Isaac Lowe	SD	12	17 Feb 2018	Manchester Arena, Manchester, England	Retained British featherweight title
25	Win	22–2–1	Marco McCullough	TKO	11 (12), 1:58	20 May 2017	Copper Box Arena, London, England	Retained British featherweight title
24	Loss	21–2–1	Dennis Ceylan	SD	12	15 Oct 2016	Arena Nord, Frederikshavn, Denmark	For vacant European featherweight title
23	Win	21–1–1	James Tennyson	TKO	5 (12), 2:34	30 Apr 2016	Copper Box Arena, London, England	Retained British featherweight title
22	Win	20–1–1	Darren Traynor	TKO	5 (12), 2:06	22 Jan 2016	York Hall, London, England	Retained British featherweight title
21	Win	19–1–1	Samir Mouneimne	SD	12	26 Sep 2015	The SSE Arena, London, England	Won vacant British featherweight title
20	Win	18–1–1	Reynaldo Cajina	PTS	8	14 Nov 2014	Pabellón Polideportivo Las Torres, Adeje, Canary Islands	
19	Win	17–1–1	Ibrar Riyaz	PTS	6	27 Jun 2014	Epic Centre, Norwich, England	
18	Loss	16–1–1	Lee Selby	UD	12	5 Oct 2013	The O2 Arena, London, England	For British and Commonwealth featherweight titles
17	Win	16–0–1	Jose Antonio Elizabeth	TKO	3 (8), 2:37	15 Jun 2013	Epic Centre, Norwich, England	
16	Win	15–0–1	Oszkar Fiko	TKO	3 (6)	22 Mar 2013	Epic Centre, Norwich, England	
15	Draw	14–0–1	Ronnie Clark	PTS	10	10 Nov 2012	Norfolk Showground, Norwich, England	
14	Win	14–0	Mikheil Gogebashvili	TKO	1 (8), 2:37	15 Sep 2012	Norfolk Showground, Norwich, England	
13	Win	13–0	Liam Richards	UD	10	21 Oct 2011	York Hall, London, England	Won English super-bantamweight title
12	Win	12–0	Gavin Reid	TKO	7 (8), 2:43	2 Apr 2011	York Hall, London, England	
11	Win	11–0	James Ancliff	PTS	8	23 Oct 2010	York Hall, London, England	
10	Win	10–0	Eugene Heagney	TKO	1 (6), 0:49	15 May 2010	Boleyn Ground, London, England	
9	Win	9–0	Ian Bailey	PTS	6	13 Feb 2010	Wembley Arena, London, England	
8	Win	8–0	Michael O'Gara	TKO	5 (6), 1:26	9 Oct 2009	York Hall, London, England	
7	Win	7–0	Marc Callaghan	RTD	3 (6), 3:00	22 May 2009	York Hall, London, England	
6	Win	6–0	Sid Razak	PTS	4	30 Jan 2009	York Hall, London, England	
5	Win	5–0	Johnny Greaves	PTS	4	6 Dec 2008	ExCeL, London, England	
4	Win	4–0	Robin Deakin	PTS	4	26 Sep 2008	York Hall, London, England	
3	Win	3–0	Gheorghe Ghiompirica	PTS	4	16 Jun 2008	York Hall, London, England	
2	Win	2–0	Robin Deakin	PTS	4	8 Mar 2008	The O2 Arena, London, England	
1	Win	1–0	Riaz Durgahed	KO	1 (4), 0:21	2 Feb 2008	ExCeL, London, England	

Sporting positions
Regional boxing titles
Vacant Title last held by Matthew Marsh	English super-bantamweight champion 21 October 2011 – November 2012; Vacated	Vacant Title next held by Jazza Dickens
Vacant Title last held by Josh Warrington	British featherweight champion 26 September 2015 – present	Incumbent
