= Francesco Patera =

Belgian boxer (born 1993)

Personal information
- Nationality: Belgian
- Born: 23 April 1993 (age 33)
- Height: 5 ft 9 in (175 cm)
- Weight: Lightweight

Boxing career
- Stance: Orthodox

Boxing record
- Total fights: 36
- Wins: 30
- Win by KO: 11
- Losses: 6

Francesco Patera (born 23 April 1993) is a Belgian former professional boxer. He was a two-time European lightweight champion.

== Career ==
A professional boxer since 2012 and with a perfect record of 15 wins from 15 pro-fights, Patera faced Yvan Mendy for the vacant European lightweight title at Salle Leo Lagrange in Pont-Sainte-Maxence, France, on 13 May 2016, but lost by unanimous decision.

Just less than a year later, on 6 May 2017, he got a second chance at the title, taking on defending champion Edis Tatli at the Gatorade Center in Turku, Finland. Patera won the fight via split decision with two of the ringside judges favouring him 116–112 and 115–113 respectively, while the third scored the contest 116–112 for his opponent.

His first defense was a rematch with Tatli at Kisahalli in Helsinki, Finland, on 12 December 2017, which he lost by unanimous decision.

Patera became a two-time European lightweight champion on 13 October 2018, when he defeated Lewis Ritson for the vacant title at Newcastle Arena in England. As with his first championship success, he won the bout via split decision with two judges scoring it 116–112 for him and the third giving it to his opponent by the same margin.

He successfully defended his title three times in 2019. First with a unanimous decision success over Marvin Petit in Herstal, Belgium, on 16 February, then stopping Paul Hyland Jnr in the sixth round in Milan, Italy, on 28 June, and finally overcoming Domenico Valentino via unanimous decision, again in Milan, on 25 October.

Patera vacated the championship to pursue a shot at a world title which never materialised. He continued to fight professionally for six more years, most notably losing to future world champion Keyshawn Davis by unanimous decision over 10 rounds at Firelake Arena in Shawnee, Oklahoma, USA, on 22 July 2023.

His final pro-fight was a unanimous decision loss to Dzmitry Asanau in Montreal, Canada, on 10 April 2025. Patera announced his retirement from professional boxing in August 2025, writing on social media: "This sport gave me everything – discipline, purpose and unforgettable moments."
