= Paul Hyland =

Paul Hyland may refer to:

- Paul V. Hyland (1876–1966), architect in Nebraska, United States
- Paul Hyland (boxer) (born 1984), Irish boxer
