= Socarras =

Socarras or Socarrás is a surname. Notable people with the surname include:

- Alberto Socarras (1908–1987), Cuban-American flautist
- Carlos Prío Socarrás (1903–1977), Cuban politician
- Francisco Prío Socarrás, Cuban politician
- Hairon Socarras (born 1993), Cuban boxer
- Karina Socarrás (born 1993), Puerto Rican footballer
