= The Golden Contract =

The Golden Contract is a professional boxing tournament created by boxing management and promotions company MTK Global. The tournament is held across three weight-classes with eight fighters in each class, competing in 10 x 3 minute rounds. The winners of each tournament secure a two-year, five-fight contract with MTK Global that guarantees a six-figure purse for each fight. The tournament is televised live on Sky Sports in the United Kingdom and streamed through ESPN+ in the United States.

== 2019/2020 ==
The Golden Contract's inaugural tournament is being contested across the featherweight, super-lightweight and light-heavyweight divisions.

=== Featherweight ===
Competitors in the featherweight edition are; Britain's Ryan Walsh, Leigh Wood, Jazza Dickens and Tyrone McCullagh; Ireland's David Oliver Joyce; Mexico's Carlos Araujo; Spain's Carlos Ramos; and Hairon Socarras of Cuba. With Britain's Razaq Najib and Jacob Robinson in reserve. The quarter-final bouts took place on 4 October 2019 at the York Hall, London, and the semi-finals on 21 February 2020 at the same venue. The final was originally set to take place in June, however, due to the COVID-19 pandemic the date was pushed back to 30 September.

Quarter-finals
(United Kingdom) Ryan Walsh	TKO 8
(Cuba) Hairon Socarras
(United Kingdom) Tyrone McCullagh	UD
(United Kingdom) Razaq Najib ^{n1}
(United Kingdom) Leigh Wood	TKO 9
(Republic of Ireland) David Oliver Joyce
(United Kingdom) Jazza Dickens	UD
(Spain) Carlos Ramos

Semi-finals
(United Kingdom) Ryan Walsh	UD
(United Kingdom) Tyrone Mccullagh
(United Kingdom) Leigh Wood
(United Kingdom) Jazza Dickens	MD

Final
(United Kingdom) Ryan Walsh	–
(United Kingdom) Jazza Dickens	UD

^Note 1 Araujo failed to make weight; Najib brought in as replacement

=== Super-lightweight ===
Competitors in the super-lightweight edition are; Britain's Tyrone McKenna, Ohara Davies, Jeff Ofori, Darren Surtees, Kieran Gething and Mikey Sakyi; America's Logan Yoon; and France's Mohamed Mimoune. The quarter-final bouts took place on 22 November 2019 at the York Hall, London, and the semi-finals on 21 February 2020. The final was originally set to take place in June, however, due to the COVID-19 pandemic the date was pushed back to 30 September.

Quarter-finals
(United Kingdom) Ohara Davies	RTD 7
(United States) Logan Yoon
(United Kingdom) Kieran Gething
(United Kingdom) Jeff Ofori ^{n1}	Draw
(United Kingdom) Tyrone McKenna	UD
(Spain) Mikey Sakyi
(France) Mohamed Mimoune	TKO 5
(United Kingdom) Darren Surtees

Semi-finals
(United Kingdom) Ohara Davies	TKO
(United Kingdom) Jeff Ofori
(United Kingdom) Tyrone McKenna	UD
(France) Mohamed Mimoune

Final
(United Kingdom) Ohara Davies	MD
(United Kingdom) Tyrone McKenna	–

^Note 1 Ofori replaced Lewis Benson due to injury

=== Light-heavyweight ===
Competitors in the light-heavyweight edition are; Britain's Hosea Burton, Steven Ward, Liam Conroy, Tommy Philbin, Andre Sterling and Bob Ajisafe; Germany's Serge Michel; and Latvia's Ričards Bolotņiks. The quarter-final bouts took place on 14 December 2019 at the Brentwood Centre, Brentwood. The semi-finals were originally scheduled to take place on 20 March 2020 at the York Hall in London, however, due to the COVID-19 pandemic the event was rescheduled to take place in September, being split over two nights; the first bout, featuring Bolotniks, took place in Bolotniks' hometown of Rīga, Latvia, on 26 September; the second bout will take place on the same card as the featherweight and super-lightweight finals on 30 September at the York Hall in London.

Quarter-finals
(United Kingdom) Bob Ajisafe	–
(United Kingdom) Hosea Burton	UD
(Republic of Ireland) Steven Ward	–
(Latvia) Ričards Bolotņiks	TKO
(United Kingdom) Andre Sterling	–
(United Kingdom) Liam Conroy	UD
(United Kingdom) Tommy Philbin	–
(Germany) Serge Michel	UD

Semi-finals
(United Kingdom) Hosea Burton	–
(Latvia) Ričards Bolotņiks	UD
(United Kingdom) Liam Conroy	–
(Germany) Serge Michel	TKO

Final
(Latvia) Ričards Bolotņiks	TKO
(Germany) Serge Michel	–
