= Umar Salamov =

Russian boxer (born 1994)

Personal information
- Born: 7 June 1994 (age 32) Grozny, Russia
- Height: 6 ft 3 1/2 in (192 cm)
- Weight: Light-heavyweight; Cruiserweight

Boxing career
- Reach: 76 in (193 cm)
- Stance: Orthodox

Boxing record
- Total fights: 34
- Wins: 32
- Win by KO: 24
- Losses: 2

Umar Isaevich Salamov (Russian: Умар Исаевич Саламов; born 7 June 1994) is a Russian professional boxer who held the IBO light-heavyweight title in 2016.

== Professional career ==
In May 2016, Salamov moved to Las Vegas, Nevada to start at a new training camp in Kevin Barry's gym. Barry is well known for training legendary boxers like David Tua, former WBA middleweight champion Maselino Masoe, three time world champion Beibut Shumenov and former IBF junior-lightweight champion Robbie Peden. Barry has trained Salamov alongside Izu Ugonoh and former WBO heavyweight champion Joseph Parker.

=== Salamov vs. Anim ===
On 1 December 2018, Salamov defeated Emmanuel Anim by unanimous decision in their 10 round contest. The scorecards read 98–92, 97–93, 99–91, in favor of Salamov.

=== Salamov vs. Danso ===
On 19 September 2019, Salamov fought and beat Emmanuel Danso by knockout in the 3rd round.

=== Salamov vs. Bivol ===
On 11 December 2021, Salamov fought Dmitry Bivol for the WBA light heavyweight division championship. Bivol was ranked as the #2 light heavyweight in the world according to The Ring magazine at that time. Bivol won the fight by unanimous decision in their 12 round contest, with the scorecards being 119–109, 118–109, 118–110 in Bivol's favor.

== Professional titles held ==
- International Boxing Organization
  - Youth World Light Heavyweight title (2013)
  - World Light Heavyweight title (2016)
- World Boxing Organisation
  - Youth World Light Heavyweight title (2014)
  - WBO European Light Heavyweight title (2014)
  - WBO International light heavyweight title (2017)
- International Boxing Federation
  - IBF East/West Europe light heavyweight title (2017)

== Professional boxing record ==
31 fights	29 wins	2 losses
By knockout	21	0
By decision	8	2

No.	Result	Record	Opponent	Type	Round, time	Date	Location	Notes
31	Win	29–2	(Ukraine) Server Emurlaev	RTD	4 (12), 3:00	11 Sep 2024	USC Soviet Wings, Moscow, Russia	
30	Win	28–2	(Kyrgyzstan) Dilmurod Satybaldiev	UD	10	24 Feb 2024	Krylia Sovetov, Moscow, Russia	
29	Win	27–2	(Namibia) Vikapita Meroro	KO	1 (10), 1:41	25 Sep 2022	Basket-Hall Arena, Kazan, Russia	
28	Loss	26–2	(Russia) Dmitry Bivol	UD	12	11 Dec 2021	KRK “Uralets”, Ekaterinburg, Russia	For WBA (Super) light-heavyweight title
27	Win	26–1	(Russia) Sergei Ekimov	UD	10	8 Apr 2021	Uvais Akhtaev Sports Palace, Grozny, Russia	
26	Win	25–1	(Ghana) Emmanuel Danso	KO	3 (12), 2:30	19 Sep 2019	Uvais Akhtaev Sports Palace, Grozny, Russia	Retained WBO International light-heavyweight titles
25	Win	24–1	(Poland) Norbert Dąbrowski	KO	9 (12), 2:02	18 Apr 2019	Colosseum Sport Hall, Grozny, Russia	Retained WBO International light-heavyweight titles
24	Win	23–1	(Ghana) Emmanuel Anim	UD	10	1 Dec 2018	Galaktika Culture Centre, Estosadok, Russia	Retained WBO International, and EBP light-heavyweight titles
23	Win	22–1	(Germany) Denis Liebau	KO	2 (10), 2:12	5 Sep 2018	Amphitheatre, Grozny, Russia	Won vacant WBO International, and EBP light-heavyweight titles
22	Win	21–1	(United States) Brian Howard	KO	9 (10), 0:53	22 Jun 2018	(United States) Masonic Temple, Detroit, Michigan, US	Won vacant IBF North American light-heavyweight title
21	Win	20–1	(Ukraine) Artem Redko	TKO	3 (10), 2:43	21 Dec 2017	Krylia Sovetov, Moscow, Russia	
20	Loss	19–1	(Australia) Damien Hooper	UD	10	2 Jul 2017	Suncorp Stadium, Brisbane, Australia	Lost WBO International light-heavyweight title; For vacant IBF International light-heavyweight title
19	Win	19–0	(Bosnia and Herzegovina) Emil Markic	TKO	4 (10), 2:15	6 May 2017	Vodafone Events Centre, Auckland, New Zealand	Won vacant WBO International, and IBF East/West Europe light-heavyweight titles
18	Win	18–0	(Tanzania) Abdallah Paziwapazi	TKO	1 (12), 2:58	10 Dec 2016	Krylia Sovetov, Moscow, Russia	
17	Win	17–0	(Hungary) Norbert Nemesapati	UD	10	23 Aug 2016	Colosseum Sport Hall, Grozny, Russia	
16	Win	16–0	(United Kingdom) Bob Ajisafe	UD	12	22 May 2016	Khodynka Ice Palace, Moscow, Russia	Won vacant IBO light-heavyweight title
15	Win	15–0	(Uganda) Joey Vegas	TKO	2 (10), 0:36	5 Mar 2016	Colosseum Sport Hall, Grozny, Russia	
14	Win	14–0	(France) Doudou Ngumbu	UD	12	14 Nov 2015	Ice Palace, Brovary, Ukraine	Retained WBO European light-heavyweight title
13	Win	13–0	(Czech Republic) Tomas Adamek	KO	4 (10), 0:58	13 Jun 2015	Cherkasy, Ukraine	Retained WBO European light-heavyweight title
12	Win	12–0	(Bosnia and Herzegovina) Enes Zecirevic	UD	10	12 Nov 2014	Ice Palace, Brovary, Ukraine	Retained WBO Youth light-heavyweight title; Won vacant WBO European light-heavyweight title
11	Win	11–0	(Georgia (country)) Giorgi Beroshvili	RTD	3 (8), 3:00	31 May 2014	Sportpalace, Odesa, Ukraine	
10	Win	10–0	(Russia) Gasan Gasanov	TKO	4 (10), 2:01	25 Apr 2014	Dynamo Sports in Krylatskoye, Moscow, Russia	Won vacant WBO Youth light-heavyweight title
9	Win	9–0	(Georgia (country)) Paata Aduashvili	TKO	2 (8), 1:09	1 Mar 2014	Spartak Gym, Kyiv, Ukraine	
8	Win	8–0	(Uzbekistan) Ravshan Jabbarov	RTD	6 (10), 3:00	9 Nov 2013	Sport Palace, Kyiv, Ukraine	Won vacant IBO Youth light-heavyweight title
7	Win	7–0	(Belarus) Dmitry Adamovich	KO	2 (6), 2:49	21 Sep 2013	Sportpalace Lokomotiv, Kharkiv, Ukraine	
6	Win	6–0	(Ukraine) Andriy Monakhov	TKO	3 (4), 1:16	2 Jul 2013	Spartak Gym, Kyiv, Ukraine	
5	Win	5–0	(Georgia (country)) Davit Ribakoni	KO	6 (6), 2:50	20 Apr 2013	Sportpalace, Kharkiv, Ukraine	
4	Win	4–0	(Belarus) Iliya Shakuro	TKO	3 (6), 1:22	16 Mar 2013	Sport Palace, Kyiv, Ukraine	
3	Win	3–0	(Ukraine) Vladyslav Nykytenko	TKO	3 (4)	16 Feb 2013	Spartak Gym, Kyiv, Ukraine	
2	Win	2–0	(Ukraine) Serhiy Chichikalov	UD	4	26 Jan 2013	SC Voskhod, Kyiv, Ukraine	
1	Win	1–0	(Ukraine) Mykhailo Lidovskyy	KO	2 (4), 1:19	15 Dec 2012	Cherkasy, Ukraine	
