= Tyrone McCullagh =

Irish boxer (born 1990)

Personal information
- Nickname: White Chocolate
- Nationality: Irish
- Born: 9 September 1990 (age 36) Derry, Northern Ireland
- Height: 5 ft 6 in (168 cm)
- Weight: Super-bantamweight; Featherweight

Boxing career
- Stance: Southpaw

Boxing record
- Total fights: 16
- Wins: 14
- Win by KO: 6
- Losses: 2
Medal record
Men's amateur boxing
Representing Ireland
European Championships
Bronze medal – third place	2010 Moscow	Featherweight

Tyrone McCullagh (born 9 September 1990) is an Irish former professional boxer. As an amateur, he won bronze at the 2010 European Championships and represented Northern Ireland at the 2010 Commonwealth Games where he reached the quarter-finals.

== Personal life ==
McCullagh was born in Derry.

Away from boxing, he works as a mental health nurse and has acknowledged the work of the NHS on his fight shorts.

An outspoken Irish nationalist, he has stated numerous times that he will not box for the British title despite being in a position to do so.

== Amateur career ==
An amateur with Illies GG in Donegal and then Holy Family GG in Belfast, he won the Irish title in 2010 and would go on to claim bronze at the European Championships in Moscow that summer. A runner-up at National level twice more, as well as spending time in Kazakhstan as part of the Astana Arlans World Series of Boxing team.

== Professional career ==
Turning professional having been angered by the politics of the amateur side of the sport, McCullagh made his professional debut on 25 July 2015, in Ellesmere Port, where he scored a second-round knockout (KO) of Tamas Laska.

Following 10 wins, and a move down in weight to super-bantamweight, he secured a shot at the Celtic title versus Scottish champ Joe Ham. McCullagh defeated Ham in Belfast on 30 June 2018, surviving a knockdown in the third round to otherwise dominate the Glaswegian.

McCullagh would then beat English champion Josh Kennedy on 5 October 2018 to add the WBO European title to his collection, a belt he would subsequently defend versus Spanish champion Alvaro Rodriguez.

McCullagh returned to featherweight in his next fight to enter The Golden Contract competition and he would win his quarter-final bout on 4 October 2019 at the York Hall, London, versus late replacement Razaq Najib. McCullagh was subsequently defeated by Ryan Walsh in the semi-finals at the same venue on 21 February 2020.

== Professional boxing record ==
15 fights	14 wins	1 loss
By knockout	6	0
By decision	7	1
By disqualification	1	0

No.	Result	Record	Opponent	Type	Round, time	Date	Location	Notes
15	Loss	14–1	(United Kingdom) Ryan Walsh	UD	10	21 Feb 2020	(United Kingdom) York Hall, London, England	The Golden Contract: Featherweight – semi-final
14	Win	14–0	(United Kingdom) Razaq Najib	UD	10	4 Oct 2019	(United Kingdom) York Hall, London, England	The Golden Contract: Featherweight – quarter-final
13	Win	13–0	(Spain) Álvaro Rodríguez	UD	10	3 May 2019	(United Kingdom) Eagles Community Arena, Newcastle, England	Retained WBO European super-bantamweight title
12	Win	12–0	(United Kingdom) Josh Kennedy	UD	10	5 Oct 2018	(United Kingdom) Titanic Exhibition Centre, Belfast, Northern Ireland	Won vacant WBO European super-bantamweight title
11	Win	11–0	(United Kingdom) Joe Ham	UD	10	30 June 2018	(United Kingdom) SSE Arena, Belfast, Northern Ireland	Won vacant BBBofC Celtic super-bantamweight title
10	Win	10–0	(Nicaragua) Elvis Guillén	TKO	3 (6), 2:10	21 Apr 2018	(United Kingdom) SSE Arena, Belfast, Northern Ireland	
9	Win	9–0	(Germany) Tom Tran	TKO	5 (8), 0:55	1 Dec 2017	(United Kingdom) Devenish Complex, Belfast, Northern Ireland	
8	Win	8–0	(United Kingdom) Craig Derbyshire	DQ	2 (?)	16 Sep 2017	(United Kingdom) Devenish Complex, Belfast, Northern Ireland	
7	Win	7–0	(Nicaragua) José Aguilar	PTS	4	10 Jun 2017	(United Kingdom) Odyssey Arena, Belfast, Northern Ireland	
6	Win	6–0	(Ghana) Michael Barnor	PTS	4	3 Mar 2017	(United Kingdom) Devenish Complex, Belfast, Northern Ireland	
5	Win	5–0	(Nicaragua) Edwin Téllez	TKO	4 (6), 2:32	8 Oct 2016	(United Kingdom) Europa Hotel, Belfast, Northern Ireland	
4	Win	4–0	(Latvia) Aleksandrs Birkenbergs	PTS	4	25 Jun 2016	(Republic of Ireland) National Stadium, Dublin, Ireland	
3	Win	3–0	(Latvia) Antons Zacests	TKO	1 (4), 1:43	6 Feb 2016	(United Kingdom) Europa Hotel, Belfast, Northern Ireland	
2	Win	2–0	(Hungary) Bence Sipos	TKO	2 (4), 0:15	21 Nov 2015	(United Kingdom) York Hall, London, England	
1	Win	1–0	(Hungary) Tamas Laska	TKO	2 (4), 1:14	25 July 2015	(United Kingdom) Ellesmere Port Sports Village, Ellesmere Port, England	
