= Hosea Burton =

British boxer (born 1988)

Personal information
- Nickname: The Hammer
- Born: Hosea Noah Burton; 14 September 1988 (age 38) Newcastle, England
- Height: 6 ft 4 in (193 cm)
- Weight: Light-heavyweight; Cruiserweight

Boxing career
- Stance: Orthodox

Boxing record
- Total fights: 32
- Wins: 28
- Win by KO: 12
- Losses: 4
Medal record
Men's amateur boxing
Representing England
English National Championships
Gold medal – first place	2009 Sheffield	Middleweight
Gold medal – first place	2010 London	Middleweight

Hosea Noah Burton (born 14 September 1988) is a British former professional boxer who held the British light-heavyweight title in 2016. As an amateur, he won the 2009 ABAE National Championships in the middleweight division. Hosea is a cousin of heavyweight boxer Tyson Fury.

== Professional career ==
Born in Newcastle upon Tyne and based in Manchester, Burton was successful as an amateur, winning the ABA senior middleweight title in 2009, beating Kirk Garvey in the final.

Trained by Joe Gallagher, he had his first professional fight in March 2012 at super-middleweight, a first round stoppage of Viktor Tzonev.

After winning his first 14 fights, he faced the also undefeated Miles Shinkwin on 27 February 2016 at Manchester Arena for the vacant British light-heavyweight title. Burton knocked Shinkwin down in the second and fifth rounds before finally stopping him in the sixth.

Burton lost the title in his first defense, going down to a 12th round stoppage defeat against Frank Buglioni at Manchester Arena on 10 December 2016.

Burton challenged WBO European light-heavyweight champion Ričards Bolotņiks in Rīga, Latvia, on 26 September 2020, losing by unanimous decision.

On 25 June 2021 in Bolton, Burton beat Liam Conroy by knockout in the sixth round in an eliminator for a shot at the British light-heavyweight title.

At Wembley Arena in London on 20 November 2021, Burton fought Dan Azeez for the vacant British light-heavyweight title. Azeez beat Burton by technical knockout in the seventh round.

Burton faced Ellis Zorro for the vacant WBO European cruiserweight title at York Hall in London on 12 May 2023, losing by stoppage in the seventh round.

== Professional boxing record ==
32 fights	28 wins	4 losses
By knockout	12	3
By decision	16	1

No.	Result	Record	Opponent	Type	Round, time	Date	Location	Notes
32	Loss	28–4	Ellis Zorro	TKO	7 (10), 1:28	12 May 2023	York Hall, London, England	For vacant WBO European cruiserweight title
31	Win	28–3	Darryl Sharp	PTS	6	3 Dec 2022	Tottenham Hotspur Stadium, London, England	
30	Win	27–3	Erik Nazaryan	PTS	4	7 Oct 2022	Bolton Whites Hotel, Bolton, England	
29	Loss	26–3	Dan Azeez	TKO	7 (12), 2:27	20 Nov 2021	Wembley Arena, London, England	For vacant British light-heavyweight title
28	Win	26–2	Liam Conroy	KO	6 (12), 1:44	25 Jun 2021	Bolton Whites Hotel, Bolton, England	
27	Loss	25–2	Ricards Bolotniks	UD	10	26 Sep 2020	Studio 69, Rīga, Latvia	For WBO European light-heavyweight title; The Golden Contract: light-heavyweight – semi-final
26	Win	25–1	Bob Ajisafe	UD	10	14 Dec 2019	Brentwood Centre, Brentwood, England	The Golden Contract: light-heavyweight – quarter-final
25	Win	24–1	Edgars Sniedze	PTS	6	5 Jul 2019	Bolton Whites Hotel, Bolton, England	
24	Win	23–1	Arturs Kulikauskis	PTS	6	9 Nov 2018	Victoria Warehouse Hotel, Manchester, England	
23	Win	22–1	Saidou Sall	KO	1 (6), 0:29	13 Oct 2018	Metro Radio Arena, Newcastle, England	
22	Win	21–1	Josip Perkovic	PTS	8	25 Feb 2018	Victoria Warehouse Hotel, Manchester, England	
21	Win	20–1	Ratu Latianara	TKO	1 (6), 1:20	7 Oct 2017	Manchester Arena, Manchester, England	
20	Win	19–1	Tamas Kozma	PTS	8	25 Mar 2017	Manchester Arena, Manchester, England	
19	Loss	18–1	Frank Buglioni	TKO	12 (12), 1:56	10 Dec 2016	Manchester Arena, Manchester, England	Lost British light-heavyweight title
18	Win	18–0	Fernando Castaneda	TKO	3 (10), 2:18	24 Sep 2016	Manchester Arena, Manchester, England	
17	Win	17–0	Jozsef Kormany	TKO	2 (6), 1:47	29 May 2016	Goodison Park, Liverpool, England	
16	Win	16–0	Michal Ludwiczak	TKO	4 (6), 2:58	7 May 2016	Manchester Arena, Manchester, England	
15	Win	15–0	Miles Shinkwin	TKO	6 (12), 1:13	27 Feb 2016	Manchester Arena, Manchester, England	Won vacant British light-heavyweight title
14	Win	14–0	Elvis Dube	PTS	6	19 Sep 2015	Olympia, Liverpool, England	
13	Win	13–0	Nathan King	PTS	6	18 Jul 2015	Manchester Arena, Manchester, England	
12	Win	12–0	Joe Hillerby	TKO	4 (4), 2:23	4 Apr 2015	Metro Radio Arena, Newcastle, England	
11	Win	11–0	Marko Martinjak	TKO	5 (6), 1:56	29 Nov 2014	Barnsley Metrodome, Barnsley, England	
10	Win	10–0	Tsvetozar Iliev	TKO	4 (4), 1:13	13 Sep 2014	Phones 4u Arena, Manchester, England	
9	Win	9–0	Valentin Freulon	PTS	8	19 Apr 2014	Phones 4u Arena, Manchester, England	
8	Win	8–0	Moses Matovu	PTS	4	22 Feb 2014	Hull Arena, Hull, England	
7	Win	7–0	Jahmaine Smyle	TKO	1 (6), 1:37	1 Jun 2013	Bowlers Exhibition Centre, Manchester, England	
6	Win	6–0	Carl Wild	PTS	6	8 Mar 2013	Bowlers Exhibition Centre, Manchester, England	
5	Win	5–0	James Tucker	PTS	4	12 Oct 2012	Bowlers Exhibition Centre, Manchester, England	
4	Win	4–0	Pawel Trebinski	PTS	4	22 Jun 2012	De Vere Whites Hotel, Bolton, England	
3	Win	3–0	Danny Brown	PTS	4	8 Jun 2012	Magna Centre, Rotherham, England	
2	Win	2–0	Robert Studzinski	PTS	4	27 Apr 2012	Echo Arena, Liverpool, England	
1	Win	1–0	Viktor Tzonev	KO	1 (4), 2:30	11 Mar 2012	De Vere Whites Hotel, Bolton, England	
