= Sam Noakes =

English boxer (born 1997)

Personal information
- Nickname: Midge
- Born: 20 July 1997 (age 29) Maidstone, Kent, England
- Height: 5 ft 8 in (173 cm)
- Weight: Lightweight

Boxing career
- Stance: Orthodox

Boxing record
- Total fights: 20
- Wins: 19
- Win by KO: 16
- Losses: 1

Sam Noakes (born 20 July 1997) is an English professional boxer. He challenged for the WBO lightweight title in 2025. Noakes is a former British, European and Commonwealth lightweight champion.

== Career ==
After an amateur career boxing out of Westree ABC which included winning the England Boxing National Amateur Championships light-welterweight title, Noakes turned professional in July 2019 signing a four-year contract with Frank Warren's Queensbury Promotions.

His first pro-fight was on 27 September 2019 at the Royal Albert Hall in London when he won via stoppage after his opponent, Chris Adaway, quit on his stool before the final round.

In just his eighth outing, Noakes won his first title in the paid ranks by stopping Shaun Cooper in the ninth round at the Copper Box Arena in London to claim the vacant WBC International Silver lightweight championship on 4 December 2021.

He successfully defended the title with a fourth round stoppage of Vincenzo Finiello at Wembley Arena in London on 19 March 2022.

Noakes claimed the vacant Commonwealth lightweight title on 26 November 2022, defeating Calvin McCord by technical knockout in round four at The O2 Arena in London.

A second round stoppage of Karthik Sathish Kumar saw Noakes retain his Commonwealth and WBC International Silver belts at the Copper Box Arena in London on 15 April 2023.

Next, with his WBC International Silver title on the line, he secured a 12th successive win inside the distance thanks to a fourth round technical knockout victory over Carlos Perez at York Hall in London on 1 December 2023.

On 10 February 2024, Noakes won the vacant British and WBO International lightweight titles by stopping Lewis Sylvester in the fourth round at the Copper Box Arena in London.

Despite being taken the distance for the first time in his professional career, Noakes became European lightweight champion with a unanimous points victory over Frenchman Yvan Mendy in a fight for the vacant title held at York Hall in London on 20 April 2024. All three ringside judges scored the contest as a 120–108 shutout in his favour.

He made a successful first defence of his European title against mandatory challenger Gianluca Ceglia from Italy at York Hall on 6 September 2024, when his opponent retired on his stool at the end of round eight. In October 2024, Noakes signed an extension to his promotional contract with Queensbury.

Noakes defended his British, Commonwealth and WBO International titles with a unanimous decision win over Ryan Walsh at Wembley Arena in London on 7 December 2024. He was named the 2024 European Boxing Union male champion of the year.

Having vacated his European title a month earlier, Noakes stopped Patrik Balaz in the third of a scheduled eight-round contest at Nottingham Arena on 10 May 2025.

Fighting outside of England for the first time, Noakes faced fellow unbeaten boxer, Abdullah Mason for the vacant WBO lightweight title at ANB Arena in Riyadh, Saudi Arabia, on 22 November 2025. He lost via unanimous decision with the judges scorecards reading 113–115, 113–115 and 111–117.

On 3 May 2026, Noakes made a low-key return to the competitive boxing ring, facing Benito Sanchez Garcia in a scheduled eight-round contest at York Hall in London. He got back to winning ways by stopping his opponent in the second round.

Noakes faced former WBO lightweight champion Denys Berinchyk at The O2 Arena in London on 29 August 2026. He won by unanimous decision to claim the vacant WBO International lightweight title.

== Personal life ==
Noakes' older brother Sean is also a professional boxer. He had jobs in a call centre, fast food restaurant and as a roofer before taking up boxing full-time.

== Professional boxing record ==
20 fights	19 wins	1 loss
By knockout	16	0
By decision	3	1

No.	Result	Record	Opponent	Type	Round, time	Date	Location	Notes
20	Win	19–1	Denys Berinchyk	UD	10	29 Aug 2026	The O2 Arena, London, England	Won vacant WBO International lightweight title
19	Win	18–1	Benito Sanchez Garcia	TKO	2 (8), 2:44	3 May 2026	York Hall, London, England	
18	Loss	17–1	Abdullah Mason	UD	12	22 Nov 2025	ANB Arena, Riyadh, Saudi Arabia	For vacant WBO lightweight title
17	Win	17–0	Patrik Balaz	KO	3 (8), 2:17	10 May 2025	Nottingham Arena, Nottingham, England	
16	Win	16–0	Ryan Walsh	UD	12	7 Dec 2024	Wembley Arena, London, England	Retained the British, Commonwealth and WBO International lightweight titles
15	Win	15–0	Gianluca Ceglia	RTD	8 (12), 3:00	6 Sep 2024	York Hall, London, England	Retained the European lightweight title
14	Win	14–0	Yvan Mendy	UD	12	20 Apr 2024	York Hall, London, England	Won vacant European lightweight title
13	Win	13–0	Lewis Sylvester	TKO	4 (12), 2:10	10 Feb 2024	Copper Box Arena, London, England	Retained Commonwealth and WBC International Silver lightweight titles Won vacant British and WBO International lightweight titles
12	Win	12–0	Carlos Perez	TKO	4 (10), 1:16	1 Dec 2023	York Hall, London, England	Retained WBC International Silver lightweight title
11	Win	11–0	Karthik Sathish Kumar	TKO	2 (12), 1:17	15 Apr 2023	Copper Box Arena, London, England	Retained Commonwealth and WBC International Silver lightweight titles
10	Win	10–0	Calvin McCord	TKO	4 (12), 2:14	26 Nov 2022	The O2 Arena, London, England	Retained WBC International Silver lightweight title; Won vacant Commonwealth lightweight title
9	Win	9–0	Vincenzo Finiello	TKO	4 (10), 1:54	19 Mar 2022	Wembley Arena, London, England	Retained WBC International Silver lightweight title
8	Win	8–0	Shaun Cooper	TKO	9 (10), 1:35	4 Dec 2021	Copper Box Arena, London, England	Won vacant WBC International Silver lightweight title
7	Win	7–0	Naeem Ali	TKO	2 (6), 3:00	24 Jul 2021	Wembley Arena, London, England	
6	Win	6–0	Lee Connelly	TKO	3 (6), 3:00	10 Jul 2021	Royal Albert Hall, London, England	
5	Win	5–0	Delmar Thomas	TKO	1 (8), 1:50	27 Feb 2021	Copper Box Arena, London, England	
4	Win	4–0	Jordan Ellison	TKO	5 (6), 1:28	20 Aug 2020	BT Sport Studio, London, England	
3	Win	3–0	Des Newton	TKO	1 (6), 3:00	22 Feb 2020	York Hall, London, England	
2	Win	2–0	Daryl Pearce	TKO	3 (4), 2:07	21 Dec 2019	Copper Box Arena, London, England	
1	Win	1–0	Chris Adaway	TKO	3 (4), 3:00	27 Sep 2019	Royal Albert Hall, London, England	
