= Edis Tatli =

Finnish boxer (born 1987)

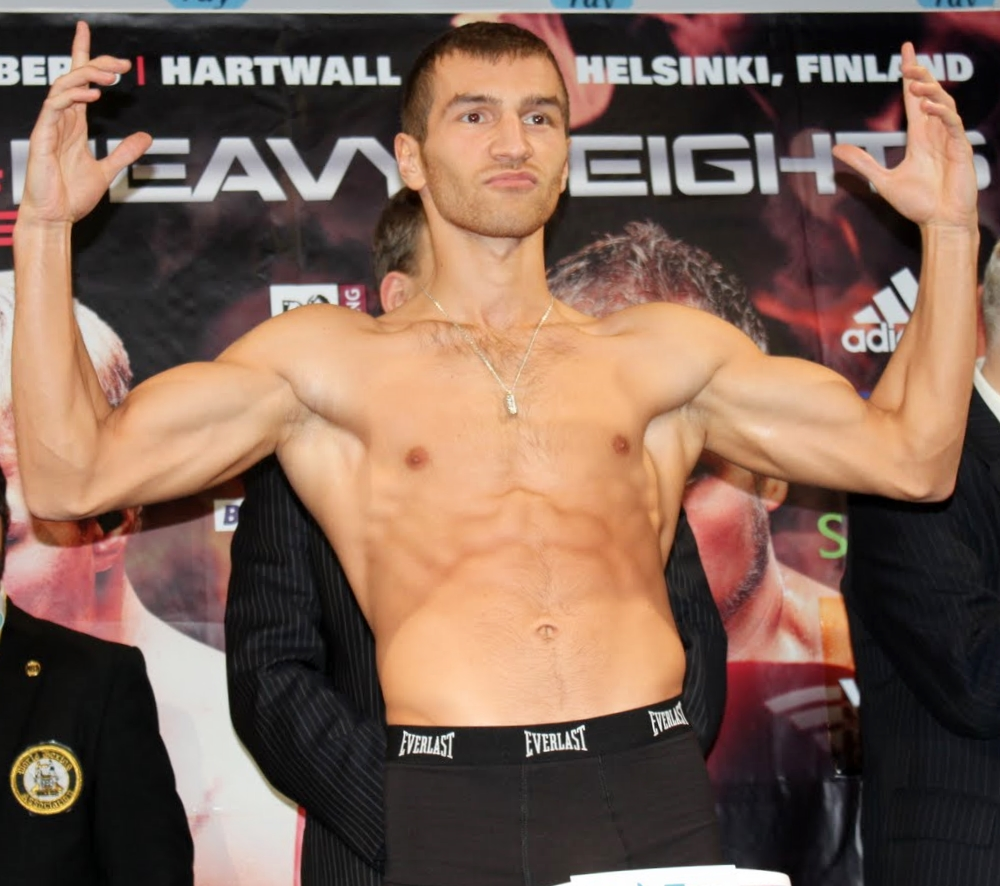
- Tatli in 2012

Personal information
- Nickname: Prince
- Nationality: Finnish
- Born: 13 August 1987 (age 39) Prizren, SFR Yugoslavia (now Kosovo)
- Height: 1.75 m (5 ft 9 in)
- Weight: Lightweight; Light-welterweight

Boxing career
- Stance: Orthodox

Boxing record
- Total fights: 35
- Wins: 32
- Win by KO: 10
- Losses: 3

Edis Tatli (born 13 August 1987) is a Finnish professional boxer. He has held the European lightweight title twice between 2015 and 2018, and has challenged once for the WBA lightweight title in 2014.

== Early life ==
Tatli was born in Prizren, Yugoslavia, in present-day Kosovo, to a Turkish father and Albanian mother. He moved to Finland at the age of four and was raised in Hämeenlinna. Having first trained in karate as a youth, at age fourteen he started boxing and won his first Finnish Amateur Championship title in 2004.

== Professional career ==
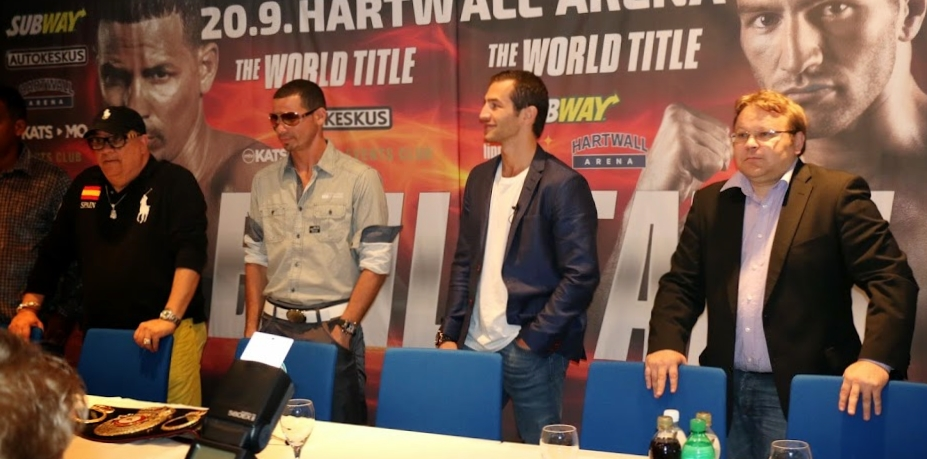
Tatli (second from right) at a press conference in 2014

Tatli turned professional in 2007. In December 2012, he won the vacant EBU-EU lightweight title against Paolo Gassani and in March 2013, Tatli beat Felix Lora for the WBA Inter-Continental lightweight title. He successfully defended the title against Mzonke Fana in December 2013 and against Antonio De Vitis in May 2014.

In July 2014, it was announced that Tatli will challenge Richard Abril for the WBA lightweight world champion title on September 20 in Helsinki. Tatli is the second Finnish boxer fighting for the World Championship title. Olli Mäki lost a featherweight championship match to Davey Moore in August 1962 at the Helsinki Olympic Stadium. The fight between Abril and Tatli is promoted by Olli's son Pekka Mäki of P3 Boxing Oy. He lost the fight by majority decision

He was supposed to fight the EBU lightweight champion Emiliano Marsili on 25 April. Marsili got injured and vacated the belt. Tatli fought Yvan Mendy instead for the EBU lightweight title, and won the fight by unanimous decision.

Edis Tatli was scheduled to face two time lightweight challenger Kevin Mitchell on 18 March 2016, in Finland, but on 10 February, Mitchell announced his retirement and withdrawal from the fight. Tatli instead faced Massimiliano Ballisai and won the fight by unanimous decision.

On 13 August 2016, Tatli defended his European title against Christian Morales by unanimous decision.

On 6 May 2017, Tatli was slated to defend his EBU lightweight belt against the highly rated Francesco Patera in his native Finland. The bout would start slow, with both boxers coming up to speed as the fight progressed. Patera was the busier man, but Tatli scored the powershots. The fight was ruled a split-decision win for Patera, with the judges scoring the fight 112–116, 113-115 and 116-112 for Patera.

In the immediate rematch, the fight was fast and entertaining from the beginning. Both fighters traded throughout the fight, with Tatli being the one whose shots visibly affected his opponent. Tatli was aggressive for most of the time, and even though he didn't manage to score a knockdown, all judges scored the fight 119-109 for the Finn, allowing him to retain the EBU lightweight title.

On 20 April 2019, Tatli fought rising prospect Teofimo Lopez, who was ranked #4 by the WBA, WBC and IBF and #5 by the WBO at lightweight. As many expected, Lopez ended the fight inside the distance with a vicious body shot in the fifth round, from which Tatli could not get up.

Tatli returned to the ring against Berman Sánchez on 10 August 2019, winning the bout via unanimous decision.

He was scheduled to fight for the EBU lightweight title against Gianluca Ceglia in May 2020, but the bout was postponed to take place on 8 August 2020, due to the COVID-19 pandemic. In turn, the bout was postponed twice due to Tatli's shoulder surgery. The fight was cancelled, it was expected to take place on 14 August 2021.

== Other appearances ==
In Autumn 2018, Tatli became a first athlete to win Dancing with the Stars, the Finnish version of the dance contest Strictly Come Dancing.

== Professional boxing record ==
35 fights	32 wins	3 losses
By knockout	10	1
By decision	22	2

No.	Result	Record	Opponent	Type	Round, time	Date	Location	Notes
35	Win	32–3	Berman Sánchez	UD	8	14 Aug 2019	Olavinlinna, Savonlinna, Finland	
34	Loss	31–3	Teófimo López	KO	5 (12), 1:32	20 Apr 2019	Madison Square Garden, New York City, New York, US	For WBC-NABF lightweight title
33	Win	31–2	Frank Urquiaga	UD	12	11 Aug 2018	Savonlinna, Finland	Retained European lightweight title
32	Win	30–2	Francesco Patera	UD	12	12 Dec 2017	Töölö Sports Hall, Helsinki, Finland	Won European lightweight title
31	Loss	29–2	Francesco Patera	SD	12	7 May 2017	Hartwall Arena, Helsinki, Finland	Lost European lightweight title
30	Win	29–1	Manuel Lancia	TKO	9 (12), 1:57	17 Dec 2016	Hartwall Arena, Helsinki, Finland	Retained European lightweight title
29	Win	28–1	Christian Morales	UD	12	13 Aug 2016	Olavinlinna, Savonlinna, Finland	Retained European lightweight title
28	Win	27–1	Massimiliano Ballisai	UD	12	19 Mar 2016	Metro Areena, Espoo, Finland	Retained European lightweight title
27	Win	26–1	Ramaz Bebnadze	TKO	3 (8), 2:59	21 Nov 2015	Töölön Kisahalli, Helsinki, Finland	
26	Win	25–1	Yvan Mendy	UD	12	25 Apr 2015	Hartwall Arena, Helsinki, Finland	Won vacant European lightweight title
25	Win	24–1	Olegs Vilcans	TKO	1 (12), 0:40	24 Jan 2015	Ringside Gym, Helsinki, Finland	
24	Loss	23–1	Richar Abril	MD	12	20 Sep 2014	Hartwall Arena, Helsinki, Finland	For WBA lightweight title
23	Win	23–0	Antonio De Vitis	TKO	8 (12), 0:01	9 May 2014	Urheilutalo, Helsinki, Finland	Retained WBA Inter-Continental lightweight title
22	Win	22–0	Mzonke Fana	UD	12	7 Dec 2013	Barona Areena, Espoo, Finland	Retained WBA Inter-Continental lightweight title
21	Win	21–0	Innocent Anyanwu	KO	5 (8), 2:00	17 Aug 2013	Olavinlinna, Savonlinna, Finland	
20	Win	20–0	Felix Lora	UD	12	9 Mar 2013	Barona Areena, Espoo, Finland	Won WBA Inter-Continental lightweight title
19	Win	19–0	Paolo Gassani	TKO	1 (10), 1:26	8 Dec 2012	Ringside Gym, Espoo, Finland	Won vacant European Union lightweight title
18	Win	18–0	Sherzodbek Mamadjanov	UD	8	31 May 2012	Ufa Arena, Ufa, Russia	
17	Win	17–0	Sarfo Tyson	TKO	1 (10), 1:35	31 Mar 2012	Barona Areena, Espoo, Finland	
16	Win	16–0	Pasquale di Silvio	UD	10	3 Dec 2011	Hartwall Arena, Helsinki, Finland	
15	Win	15–0	John Nolasco	UD	8	7 May 2011	Ice Hall, Helsinki, Finland	
14	Win	14–0	Stuart Green	UD	8	4 Mar 2011	Hartwall Arena, Helsinki, Finland	
13	Win	13–0	Asan Yuseinov	RTD	6 (8), 3:00	27 Nov 2010	Hartwall Arena, Helsinki, Finland	
12	Win	12–0	Ruddy Encarnacion	UD	8	4 Sep 2010	Töölö Sports Hall, Helsinki, Finland	
11	Win	11–0	Damien Martin	UD	6	26 Mar 2010	Töölö Sports Hall, Helsinki, Finland	
10	Win	10–0	Nikolajs Jasenko	TKO	1 (6), 0:40	12 Dec 2009	Aladdin Bar & Night Club, Espoo, Finland	
9	Win	9–0	Alex Bone	UD	6	24 Oct 2009	Urheilutalo, Helsinki, Finland	
8	Win	8–0	Walberto Gaxiola	KO	1 (6), 2:48	18 Apr 2009	Töölö Sports Hall, Helsinki, Finland	
7	Win	7–0	Sento Martinez	UD	6	14 Feb 2009	Pyynikin Palloiluhalli, Tampere, Finland	
6	Win	6–0	Juan Zapata	UD	6	28 Nov 2008	Hartwall Arena, Helsinki, Finland	
5	Win	5–0	Idiozan Matos	UD	6	30 Aug 2008	Metroauto-areena, Tampere, Finland	
4	Win	4–0	Leonti Vorontsuk	UD	4	14 Jun 2008	Kamppailuopisto, Espoo, Finland	
3	Win	3–0	Alexander Saltykov	UD	4	18 Apr 2008	Töölö Sports Hall, Helsinki, Finland	
2	Win	2–0	Juris Ivanovs	UD	4	1 Feb 2008	Töölö Sports Hall, Helsinki, Finland	
1	Win	1–0	Mohammed Ali Cherif	UD	4	22 Oct 2007	Töölö Sports Hall, Helsinki, Finland	

Sporting positions
Regional boxing titles
Vacant Title last held by Luca Giacon	European Union lightweight champion 18 December 2012 – February 2013; Vacated	Vacant Title next held by Brunet Zamora
Preceded by Felix Lora	WBA Inter-Continental lightweight champion 9 March 2013 – 20 September 2014; Lost bid for world title	Vacant Title next held by Emiliano Marsili
Vacant Title last held by Emiliano Marsili	European lightweight champion 25 April 2015 – 6 May 2017	Succeeded by Francesco Patera
Preceded by Francesco Patera	European lightweight champion 12 December 2017 – October 2018; Vacated	Vacant Title next held by Prancesco Patera
