= Bob Ajisafe =

English boxer

Personal information
- Nickname: Lionheart
- Nationality: British
- Born: Abubaker Ajisafe; 13 April 1985 (age 41) Nottingham, Nottinghamshire, England
- Height: 6 ft 2 in (188 cm)
- Weight: Light-heavyweight

Boxing career
- Stance: Southpaw

Boxing record
- Total fights: 23
- Wins: 19
- Win by KO: 9
- Losses: 4

Abubaker "Bob" Ajisafe (born 13 April 1985) is a British professional boxer. He challenged for the IBO light-heavyweight title in 2016. At regional level, he held the British light-heavyweight title in 2014 and the Commonwealth light-heavyweight title in 2015.

== Professional career ==
Born in Nottingham and now based in Leeds, Ajisafe turned professional in 2007 after a successful amateur career, winning his first six fights. In 2009 he competed in the Prizefighter tournament, losing in the quarter-final to Carl Dilks. Wins over Ovill McKenzie and Phil Goodwin in 2009 set him up for a challenge for Tony Bellew's Commonwealth title in September 2010; Bellew took a unanimous points decision despite being knocked down in the fourth round.

Ajisafe's next fight was against Darren Stubbs in July 2011 for the vacant English light-heavyweight title, Ajisafe winning after a cut above Stubbs' eye forced a stoppage. He successfully defended the title against Travis Dickinson in December 2012.

In March 2014 he met Dean Francis for the vacant British light-heavyweight title, taking a unanimous points decision. He subsequently beat Leon Senior and in November 2014 beat Matty Clarkson to win the MaxiNutrition Knockout Trophy.

In January 2015, Commonwealth champion Enzo Maccarinelli was ordered to make a mandatory defence of his title against Ajisafe.

== Professional boxing record ==
23 fights	19 wins	4 losses
By knockout	9	0
By decision	10	4

No.	Result	Record	Opponent	Type	Round	Date	Location	Notes
23	Loss	19–4	Hosea Burton	UD	10	14 Dec 2019	Brentwood Centre, Brentwood, England	The Golden Contract: Light-heavyweight – Quarter-final
22	Win	19–3	Genadij Krajevskij	TKO	6 (6)	3 Aug 2019	Oldham Leisure Centre, Oldham, England	
21	Win	18–3	Dominik Landgraf	TKO	2 (6)	16 Dec 2018	Victoria Warehouse, Manchester, England	
20	Win	17–3	Josef Obeslo	PTS	6	13 May 2017	First Direct Arena, Leeds, England	
19	Loss	16–3	Umar Salamov	UD	12	21 May 2016	Megasport Sport Palace, Moscow, Russia	For IBO light-heavyweight title
18	Win	16–2	Daniel Wanyonyi	KO	4	13 Jun 2015	Whitchurch Sports Centre, Bristol, England	Won Commonwealth light-heavyweight title
17	Win	15–2	Georgi Kandelaki	TKO	2	11 Apr 2015	First Direct Arena, Leeds, England	
16	Win	14–2	Matty Clarkson	RTD	4	8 Nov 2014	Glow, Bluewater, Greenhithe, England	
15	Win	13–2	Leon Senior	TKO	5 (10)	17 May 2014	Leeds Town Hall, Leeds, England	
14	Win	12–2	Dean Francis	UD	12	15 Mar 2014	Rivermead Leisure Centre, Reading, England	Won British light-heavyweight title
13	Win	11–2	Carl Wild	PTS	4	30 Mar 2013	Echo Arena, Liverpool, England	
12	Win	10–2	Travis Dickinson	UD	10	15 Dec 2012	Octagon Centre, Sheffield, England	Retained English light-heavyweight title
11	Win	9–2	Darren Stubbs	TKO	3 (10)	16 Jul 2011	Sports Centre, Oldham, England	Won English light-heavyweight title
10	Loss	8–2	Tony Bellew	UD	12	24 Sep 2010	Grosvenor House Hotel, London, England	For Commonwealth light-heavyweight title
9	Win	8–1	Phil Goodwin	PTS	6	3 Oct 2009	Leisure Centre, Altrincham, England	
8	Win	7–1	Ovill McKenzie	PTS	8	17 Apr 2009	Leigh Sports Village, Leigh, England	
7	Loss	6–1	Carl Dilks	UD	3	20 Feb 2009	York Hall, London, England	
6	Win	6–0	Adie Whitmore	TKO	4 (6)	5 Sep 2008	Harvey Hadden Leisure Centre, Nottingham, England	
5	Win	5–0	Jamie Norkett	PTS	4	25 Jul 2008	Rainton Meadows Arena, Houghton-le-Spring, England	
4	Win	4–0	Yanko Pavlov	PTS	4	9 May 2008	Eston Sports Academy, Middlesbrough, England	
3	Win	3–0	Jamie Norkett	PTS	4	26 Apr 2008	Darlington & District Club, Darlington, England	
2	Win	2–0	Victor Smith	PTS	4	22 Feb 2008	York Hall, London, England	
1	Win	1–0	Tom Owens	TKO	2 (4)	18 Nov 2007	Custard Factory, Birmingham, England	
