= Lewis Sylvester =

English boxer (born 1998)

Personal information
- Nationality: English
- Born: 20 February 1998 (age 28)
- Weight: Lightweight

Boxing career
- Stance: Orthodox

Boxing record
- Total fights: 18
- Wins: 17
- Win by KO: 4
- Losses: 1

Lewis Sylvester (born 20 February 1998) is an English professional boxer who has held the IBO Continental lightweight title since May 2025. He is a former English lightweight champion and has also challenged for the British and Commonwealth titles in the same weight division.

== Career ==
A professional since 2019, Sylvester had amassed a perfect record of 11 wins from 11 bouts by the time he defeated Adam Cope via unanimous decision to claim the vacant English lightweight title at Sheffield Arena on 1 July 2023.

He successfully defended his title with a first round stoppage of Jimmy First at the Magna Centre in Rotherham on 21 October 2023.

Sylvester challenged Commonwealth lightweight champion Sam Noakes at the Copper Box Arena in London on 10 February 2024, with the vacant British lightweight title also on the line. He lost by stoppage in the fourth round.

He faced Reece Mould for the vacant IBO Continental title at the Eco-Power Stadium in Doncaster on 23 May 2025. Sylvester won by split decision with two of the ringside judges scoring the contest 97–93 and 96–94 respectively in his favour while the third had it 96–94 for his opponent.
