= Isaac Lowe =

English boxer (born 1994)

Personal information
- Nickname: Westgate Warrior
- Nationality: English
- Born: 21 January 1994 (age 32) Lancaster, Lancashire, England
- Height: 5 ft 7 in (170 cm)
- Weight: Featherweight

Boxing career
- Stance: Orthodox

Boxing record
- Total fights: 31
- Wins: 25
- Win by KO: 8
- Losses: 3
- Draws: 3

Isaac Lowe (born 21 January 1994) is an English professional boxer. He fought for the WBC Silver featherweight title in 2022.

== Career ==
In his amateur debut, aged 10, Lowe beat future British super bantamweight champion Marc Leach.

Lowe's professional debut was in 2012, beating Michael Stupart by TKO.

Lowe fought on the undercard of Carl Frampton vs. Scott Quigg, defeating Marco McCullough by eighth-round stoppage to win the vacant Commonwealth featherweight title on 27 February 2016 at Manchester Arena.

He fought Dennis Ceylan for the European featherweight title on 18 March 2017, with the bout ending in a technical draw after being stopped in round four due to Ceylan sustaining a cut following an accidental clash of heads.

=== Lowe vs Lopez ===
Lowe faced Luis Alberto Lopez at York Hall on 3 December 2021, in a final eliminator for the International Boxing Federation featherweight title. He suffered his first defeat as a professional, losing the fight via KO in the 7th round. Lopez later went on to become the IBF world champion.

=== Lowe vs Ball ===
Lowe fought for the vacant World Boxing Council Silver featherweight title against Nick Ball on 23 April 2022, on the undercard of Tyson Fury vs. Dillian Whyte at Wembley Stadium. He lost the fight via TKO in the 6th round. Lowe suffered a bad cut above the left eye as a result of a clash of heads.

=== Lowe vs McGregor ===
Lowe lost to Lee McGregor via unanimous decision on 21 December 2024, at Kingdom Arena in Riyadh, Saudi Arabia as part of the undercard for the heavyweight world title rematch between Oleksandr Usyk and Tyson Fury.

== Personal life ==
Lowe is a close friend of Tyson Fury and has competed on the undercard of a number of his fights including most notably a 97-92 points win over former WBC Asian featherweight champion Hasibullah Ahmadi on the Fury vs Usyk bill in Saudi Arabia on 18 May 2024.

Lowe is a gypsy and lives in Morecambe.

== Professional boxing record ==
31 fights	25 wins	3 losses
By knockout	8	2
By decision	17	1
Draws	3	

No.	Result	Record	Opponent	Type	Round, time	Date	Location	Notes
31	Loss	25–3–3	Lee McGregor	UD	10	21 Dec 2024	Kingdom Arena, Riyadh, Saudi Arabia	For vacant WBC International featherweight title
30	Win	25–2–3	Hasibullah Ahmadi	PTS	10	28 May 2024	Kingdom Arena, Riyadh, Saudi Arabia	
29	Win	24–2–3	Jonatas Rodrigo Gomes de Oliveira	KO	1 (6)	1 Dec 2023	Bolton Whites Hotel (De Vere Whites), Bolton, England	
28	Win	23–2–3	Jonathan Santana	TKO	5 (8), 2:50	21 Jul 2023	Meadowbank Sports Centre, Edinburgh, Scotland	
27	Win	22–2–3	Sandeep Singh Bhatti	PTS	6	3 Dec 2022	Tottenham Hotspur Stadium, London, England	
26	Loss	21–2–3	Nick Ball	TKO	6 (12), 1:45	23 Apr 2022	Wembley Stadium, London, England	For vacant WBC Silver featherweight title
25	Loss	21–1–3	Luis Alberto Lopez	KO	7 (12), 2:38	3 Dec 2021	York Hall, London, England	
24	Win	21–0–3	Ed Harrison	PTS	6	12 Mar 2021	Bolton Whites Hotel (De Vere Whites), Bolton, England	
23	Win	20–0–3	Alberto Guevara	UD	10	22 Feb 2020	MGM Grand Garden Arena, Paradise, Nevada, U.S.	Retained WBC International featherweight title
22	Win	19–0–3	Rubén García Hernández	UD	8	14 Sep 2019	T-Mobile Arena, Paradise, Nevada, U.S.	
21	Win	18–0–3	Duarn Vue	UD	10	15 Jun 2019	MGM Grand Garden Arena, Paradise, Nevada, U.S.	Retained WBC International featherweight title
20	Win	17–0–3	Brayan Mairena	PTS	6	9 Mar 2019	Brentwood Centre, Brentwood, England	
19	Win	16–0–3	Lucas Rafael Báez	KO	5 (10), 2:11	1 Dec 2018	Staples Center, Los Angeles, California, U.S.	Won vacant WBC International featherweight title
18	Win	15–0–3	José Hernández	PTS	4	18 Aug 2018	Windsor Park, Belfast, Northern Ireland	
17	Draw	14–0–3	Ryan Walsh	SD	12	17 Feb 2018	Manchester Arena, Manchester, England	For British featherweight title
16	Win	14–0–2	Chris Adaway	PTS	6	27 Oct 2017	City Hall, Kingston upon Hull, England	
15	Draw	13–0–2	Dennis Ceylan	TD	4 (12), 2:30	18 Mar 2017	Ceres Arena, Aarhus, Denmark	For European featherweight title; TD: Ceylan cut from accidental head clash
14	Win	13–0–1	Elvis Guillén	PTS	6	24 Sep 2016	Manchester Arena, Mancehster, England	
13	Win	12–0–1	Marco McCullough	TKO	8 (12), 1:56	27 Feb 2016	Manchester Arena, Manchester, England	Won vacant Commonwealth featherweight title
12	Draw	11–0–1	Ryan Doyle	SD	10	21 Nov 2025	Manchester Arena, Manchester, England	Retained English featherweight title
11	Win	11–0	Jamie Speight	TKO	9 (10), 1:49	5 Sep 2015	First Direct Arena, Leeds, England	Won vacant English featherweight title
10	Win	10–0	Jamie Quinn	PTS	8	4 Apr 2015	King George's Hall, Blackburn, England	
9	Win	9–0	Simas Volosinas	PTS	4	22 Nov 2014	King George's Hall, Blackburn, England	
8	Win	8–0	Andy Harris	PTS	4	17 May 2014	Town Hall, Leeds, England	
7	Win	7–0	Ibrar Riyaz	PTS	4	22 Mar 2014	Ponds Forge Arena, Sheffield, England	
6	Win	6–0	Kristian Laight	PTS	6	15 Nov 2013	Winter Gardens, Blackpool, England	
5	Win	5–0	Pavel Senkovs	PTS	4	5 Oct 2013	Sports Centre, Oldham, England	
4	Win	4–0	Aaron Flinn	KO	1 (4), 1:19	7 Jun 2013	Winter Gardens, Blackpool, England	
3	Win	3–0	Delroy Spencer	KO	2 (4), 2:30	20 Apr 2013	Winter Gardens, Blackpool, England	
2	Win	2–0	Harvey Hemsley	PTS	4	14 Dec 2012	Winter Gardens, Blackpool, England	
1	Win	1–0	Michael Stupart	TKO	1 (4), 1:37	5 Oct 2012	Winter Gardens, Blackpool, England	
