= Ričards Bolotņiks =

Latvian boxer (born 1990)

Personal information
- Nickname: The Lion
- Nationality: Latvian
- Born: 24 March 1990 (age 36) Riga, Latvia
- Height: 1.85 m (6 ft 1 in)
- Weight: Light-heavyweight; Cruiserweight

Boxing career
- Stance: Orthodox

Boxing record
- Total fights: 29
- Wins: 20
- Win by KO: 8
- Losses: 8
- Draws: 1

Ričards Bolotņiks (born 24 March 1990) is a Latvian professional boxer who held the WBO European light-heavyweight title from 2019 to 2022.

== Professional career ==
Bolotņiks played ice hockey when he was younger, but decided to try boxing since he had always wanted to fight. He made his professional debut on 15 August 2013, defeating Pavels Veselovs by first-round knockout (KO) in Riga. In his next seven bouts he won only three times, suffering losses in Germany, England and France. After that he managed a string of six victories from 2015 to 2016, during which he moved up a weight class to cruiserweight. Sitting on a 10–3–1 record, he faced Micki Nielsen in Riga on 27 January 2018, losing by controversial split decision (SD) to end his streak. Five months later he lost again to Thabiso Mchunu in South Africa, and decided to move back down to light-heavyweight.

On 12 October 2019, Bolotņiks defeated Sergei Ekimov (18–0, 9 KO) by unanimous decision (UD) in Riga for the vacant EBP light-heavyweight title, the first of his career. Later that month, he was announced as a participant in The Golden Contract light-heavyweight tournament that secured the winner a two-year, five-fight contract with MTK Global. In the quarter-finals, he matched up against undefeated Belfast native Steven Ward (12–0, 4 KO) at the Brentwood Centre in England on 14 December with his WBO European light-heavyweight title also on the line. Bolotņiks won the fight by first-round technical knockout (TKO) in an upset, flooring the champion three times en route to a new belt and a £5,000 knockout bonus. He retained his title in the semi-finals against Hosea Burton by 10-round UD in Riga on 26 September 2020. Bolotņiks retained the title again, and won the final, by stopping Serge Michel in the 10th round at Production Park Studios in South Kirkby on 2 December 2020.

He faced Joshua Buatsi for the vacant WBA International light-heavyweight title at Matchroom Fight Camp in Brentwood on 14 August 2021, losing by knockout in the 11th round.

== Professional boxing record ==
29 fights	20 wins	8 losses
By knockout	8	6
By decision	12	2
Draws	1	

No.	Result	Record	Opponent	Type	Round, time	Date	Location	Notes
29	Loss	20–8–1	Imam Khataev	TKO	6 (10), 1:34	12 May 2024	RAC Arena, Perth, Australia	
28	Win	20–7–1	Tomas Bezvoda	UD	6	3 Dec 2023	Olympic Sports Center, Riga, Latvia	
27	Loss	19–7–1	Oleksandr Gvozdyk	TKO	6 (10), 1:06	6 Apr 2023	Estadio Akron, Zapopan, Mexico	
26	Win	19–6–1	Hrvoje Sep	UD	8	1 Apr 2022	Palau Olímpic Vall d'Hebron Barcelona, Spain	
25	Loss	18–6–1	Joshua Buatsi	KO	11 (12), 2:08	14 Aug 2021	Matchroom Fight Camp, Brentwood, England	For WBA International light-heavyweight title
24	Win	18–5–1	Serge Michel	TKO	10 (10), 2:50	2 Dec 2020	Production Park Studios, South Kirkby, England	Retained WBO European light-heavyweight title; The Golden Contract: light-heavyweight – final
23	Win	17–5–1	Hosea Burton	UD	10	26 Sep 2020	Studio 69, Riga, Latvia	Retained WBO European light-heavyweight title; The Golden Contract: light-heavyweight – semi-final
22	Win	16–5–1	Steven Ward	TKO	1 (10), 2:21	14 Dec 2019	Brentwood Centre, Brentwood, England	Won WBO European light-heavyweight title; The Golden Contract: light-heavyweight – quarter-final
21	Win	15–5–1	Sergei Ekimov	UD	12	12 Oct 2019	Arēna Rīga, Riga, Latvia	Won vacant EBP light-heavyweight title
20	Win	14–5–1	Gasan Gasanov	TKO	6 (8), 0:56	15 Jun 2019	Arēna Rīga, Riga, Latvia	
19	Win	13–5–1	Patrick Mendy	MD	8	23 Mar 2019	Arēna Rīga, Riga, Latvia	
18	Win	12–5–1	Zura Mekereshvili	UD	6	6 Oct 2018	Arēna Rīga, Riga, Latvia	
17	Loss	11–5–1	Thabiso Mchunu	TKO	6 (10), 0:23	23 Jun 2018	Emperors Palace, Kempton Park, South Africa	
16	Win	11–4–1	Alejandro Emilio Valori	KO	1 (8), 2:41	17 Mar 2018	Arēna Rīga, Riga, Latvia	
15	Loss	10–4–1	Micki Nielsen	SD	8	27 Jan 2018	Arēna Rīga, Riga, Latvia	
14	Win	10–3–1	César Córdoba	TKO	1 (6), 1:47	12 Nov 2016	Bilbao Exhibition Centre, Barakaldo, Spain	
13	Win	9–3–1	Reinis Porozovs	UD	8	31 Jul 2016	Arēna Rīga, Riga, Latvia	
12	Win	8–3–1	Giorgi Tevdorashvili	UD	8	14 May 2016	Arēna Rīga, Riga, Latvia	
11	Win	7–3–1	Jarek Prusak	KO	2 (8), 0:34	21 Feb 2016	Arēna Rīga, Riga, Latvia	
10	Win	6–3–1	Reinis Porozovs	UD	6	5 Dec 2015	Arēna Rīga, Riga, Latvia	
9	Win	5–3–1	Andrejs Pokumeiko	UD	6	10 Oct 2015	Arēna Rīga, Riga, Latvia	
8	Loss	4–3–1	Kevin Buval	UD	6	22 May 2015	Gymnase Georges Racine, Clichy, France	
7	Win	4–2–1	Lukas Ablozevicius	UD	4	28 Mar 2015	Arēna Rīga, Riga, Latvia	
6	Draw	3–2–1	Pascal Villeneuve	MD	6	31 Jan 2015	Hilton Lac Leamy, Gatineau, Quebec, Canada	
5	Win	3–2	Andrejs Pokumeiko	UD	4	6 Dec 2014	Arēna Rīga, Riga, Latvia	
4	Loss	2–2	Andreas Evangelou	TKO	4 (6), 3:06	12 Jul 2014	York Hall, London, England	
3	Win	2–1	Arturs Perihs	TKO	1 (4), 0:33	18 May 2014	Club Rigas Rings, Riga, Latvia	
2	Loss	1–1	Abel Mikaelyan	TKO	3 (4), 2:30	23 Nov 2013	CU Arena, Hamburg, Germany	
1	Win	1–0	Pavels Veselovs	KO	1 (4), 2:37	15 Aug 2013	Club Rigas Rings, Riga, Latvia	
