= Serge Michel =

German boxer (born 1988)

Personal information
- Nickname: Bavarian Sniper
- Nationality: German
- Born: Sergey Michel; 10 September 1988 (age 38) Kolendo, Sakhalin Oblast, Russian SFSR, USSR (now Russia)
- Height: 5 ft 11 1/2 in (182 cm)
- Weight: Light heavyweight

Boxing career
- Stance: Orthodox

Boxing record
- Total fights: 18
- Wins: 15
- Win by KO: 10
- Losses: 3

Serge Michel (Russian: Сергей Михель, 10 September 1988) is a German professional boxer. Finalist of the 2016 Olympic Qualification in Baku and participant of the 2016 Olympic Games in Rio de Janeiro. Serge Michel boxed in the World Series of Boxing, which was structured as a team world championship, and in the semi-professional tournament mode of the amateur federation AIBA (AIBA Pro Boxing).

== Early life ==
Sergey Michel was born on 10 September 1988 in Kolendo, Sakhalin Oblast, in the Russian Soviet Federative Socialist Republic, Soviet Union (now Russia). He is of German descent through his paternal grandfather, who was a prisoner of war and spent 11 years in camps before eventually ending up on Sakhalin.

When Michel was six years old, his family emigrated from Sakhalin to Germany, settling in Traunreut, Bavaria. He began boxing at the age of 12, training in the gym of his father, Eduard Michel, who became his trainer and later his manager.

Sergey Michel's adolescence was marked by difficulties. He left school without a degree after the eighth grade and had several run-ins with the law, resulting in two juvenile sentences served at the Stadelheim prison in Munich. He was released from juvenile detention in 2010.

== Professional boxing career ==
On April 6, 2019, Michel faced off against Canadian boxer Ryan Ford in a fight for the WBC International Silver light heavyweight title. Michel would go on to suffer his first loss of his career after losing via knockout in the eighth round.

On September 30, 2020, Michel took on Liam Conroy in the semi-finals of the Golden Contract light heavyweight tournament. Michel went on to win the fight via technical knockout in the fourth round to advance to the finals of the tournament.

On December 2, 2020, Michel faced off against Ričards Bolotņiks in the finals of the Golden Contract light heavyweight tournament for the WBO European light heavyweight title. Michel would go on to lose via technical knockout in the tenth round.

On October 2, 2021, Michel returned to boxing after a near one year absence to take on Stephane Tchamba. Michel would go on to win the fight via a third round technical knockout.

== Professional boxing record ==
18 fights	15 wins	3 losses
By knockout	10	3
By decision	5	0

No.	Result	Record	Opponent	Type	Round, time	Date	Location	Notes
18	Win	15–3	Alessandro Jandejsek	UD	8	17 May 2023	Felsenkeller, Traunreut, Germany	
17	Win	14–3	Geriso Aduashvili	TKO	2 (6), 2:25	25 Mar 2023	Grand Elysée, Rotherbaum, Germany	
16	Loss	13–3	Nikodem Jeżewski	RTD	6 (10), 3:00	2 Sep 2022	Hala Polonia, Częstochowa, Poland	
15	Win	13–2	Reinis Porozovs	UD	8	25 May 2022	Felsenkeller, Traunreut, Germany	
14	Win	12–2	Stephane Tchamba	TKO	3 (8), 0:19	2 Oct 2021	TSV Maccabi, Munich, Germany	
13	Loss	11–2	Ričards Bolotņiks	TKO	10 (10), 2:50	2 Dec 2020	Production Park Studios, South Kirkby, England	For WBO European light-heavyweight title; The Golden Contract: light-heavyweight – final
12	Win	11–1	Liam Conroy	TKO	4 (10), 1:39	30 Sep 2020	Production Park Studios, South Kirkby, England	The Golden Contract: light-heavyweight – semi-final
11	Win	10–1	Tommy Philbin	UD	10	14 Dec 2019	Brentwood Centre, Brentwood, England	The Golden Contract: light-heavyweight – quarter-final
10	Win	9–1	Vukasin Obradovic	TKO	3 (6), 2:55	12 Oct 2019	Halle Westand, Braunschweig, Germany	
9	Loss	8–1	Ryan Ford	KO	8 (12), 0:37	6 Apr 2019	Ballhaus Forum, Unterschleißheim, Germany	For vacant WBC International Silver light-heavyweight
8	Win	8–0	Sheldon Lawrence	KO	3 (12), 2:37	6 Oct 2018	TuS Halle, Traunreut, Germany	Won vacant WBC International light-heavyweight title
7	Win	7–0	Armenak Hovhannisyan	UD	10	16 Jun 2018	Ballhaus Forum, Unterschleißheim, Germany	Won vacant BDB International light-heavyweight title
6	Win	6–0	Attila Tibor Nagy	TKO	3 (8), 2:02	12 May 2018	Nobeo Studios, Cologne, Germany	
5	Win	5–0	Giovanni Rijkaard	TKO	6 (8), 0:50	3 Mar 2018	Sartory-Saal, Cologne, Germany	
4	Win	4–0	Milos Karanovic	TKO	4 (8), 2:05	3 Feb 2018	Leipzig, Germany	
3	Win	3–0	Zura Mekereshvili	UD	8	17 Jun 2017	TuS Halle, Traunreut, Germany	
2	Win	2–0	Viktor Kessler	KO	2 (8), 0:41	22 Apr 2017	TuS Halle, Traunreut, Germany	
1	Win	1–0	Slavisa Simeunovic	TKO	2 (6), 2:03	4 Mar 2017	ASV Halle, Dachau, Germany	

== Bare-Knuckle ==
In 2023, he fought his first bout in Bare‑Knuckle at the promotion Top Dog in Moscow, defeating the undefeated champion Naim Davudov. He lost three further fights for the promotion in 2024 and 2025, against Magomed Magomedov, Sergey Martschenko and Artak Sarkissjan respectively. Since then, he has contested further bare‑knuckle bouts in this organisation and also at Ringlife Combat Series in Germany, where he won the championship title in the up‑to‑93 kg class on 4 July 2026.

== See also ==
- List of male boxers

Sporting positions
Regional boxing titles
Vacant Title last held by Elvis Hetemi	BDB International light-heavyweight champion 16 June 2018 – 2019; Vacated	Vacant Title next held by Armend Xhoxhaj
Vacant Title last held by Isaac Chilemba	WBC International light-heavyweight champion 6 October 2018 – 2019; Vacated	Vacant Title next held by Nick Hannig
