= Patrick Brown (boxer) =

English boxer (born 1999)

Patrick Brown OLY
Personal information
- Full name: Patrick James Brown
- Born: 11 November 1999 (age 26) Sale, Greater Manchester, England
- Height: 191 cm (6 ft 3 in)

Boxing career
- Weight class: Cruiserweight
- Stance: Orthodox

Boxing record
- Total fights: 7
- Wins: 7
- Win by KO: 7

Patrick James Brown OLY (born 11 November 1999) is an English professional boxer. He has held the British and Commonwealth cruiserweight titles since September 2026. As an amateur Brown represented Great Britain at the 2024 Summer Olympics.

== Amateur career ==
By 2019, Brown was a two-time North West champion. In 2021, he won the heavyweight title at the England Boxing National Amateur Championships, representing Moss Side Fire Station Boxing Club. The following year Brown was awarded a place on the GB Boxing podium squad and won his second national championship.

In March 2024, Brown secured a quota spot for the 2024 Summer Olympics in Paris when he defeated Poland's Mateusz Bereźnicki by unanimous decision in the quarter-finals at the World Qualification Tournament 1 in Busto Arsizio, Italy.

On 7 June 2024, Brown was officially announced among the Great Britain squad for the Olympics. He was drawn to fight 2021 AIBA World Boxing Championships silver medalist Keno Marley Machado from Brazil in the first round and lost by 4:1 split decision.

== Professional career ==
On 25 November 2024, Brown turned professional, signing a promotional contract with Eddie Hearn's Matchroom Boxing. He made his pro-debut against Federico Javier Grandone at Planet Ice in Altrincham on 28 March 2025, winning by stoppage in the fourth of their scheduled six-round contest. According to Frank Smith, Matchroom Boxing's chief executive officer, Brown sold over 1,200 tickets for the event.

His second professional bout was against Ivan Duka at bp pulse LIVE Arena in Birmingham on 21 June 2025, on the Galal Yafai vs Francisco Rodriguez undercard. Brown won by stoppage in the second round. Two weeks later, on 5 July 2025, Brown was back in action against Lewis Oakford at the AO Arena in Manchester on the undercard of Jack Catterall vs Harlem Eubank. He stopped his opponent in the first round.

On 13 September 2025, he made it four consecutive stoppage wins with a second round technical knockout victory over Austine Nnamdi at Windsor Park in Belfast, Northern Ireland.

Brown made his United States debut on 1 November 2025, knocking out former WBA interim light-heavyweight champion, Felix Valera, in the second of their scheduled 10 rounds at Caribe Royale Orlando in Florida. He sent his opponent to the canvas three times in quick succession in round two, the third leaving Valera lying face-down on the mat causing the referee to halt the contest without administering a count.

Back at the scene of his pro-debut, Planet Ice in Altrincham, Brown fought Vasil Ducar on 3 April 2026. He knocked down his opponent three times during the fight before it was stopped in the eighth round with Brown awarded the win by technical knockout, claiming the vacant WBA International and IBF Intercontinental cruiserweight titles in the process.

In January 2026, before the Ducar fight took place, Eddie Hearn indicated that he was going to make a substantial financial offer to John Hedges (12–0, 3 KOs) to defend his English championship against Brown. Hedges had recently recorded a notable decision victory over Ellis Zorro, after winning the belt in May 2025. Hearn described it as "a dangerous fight for both" and argued that Hedges should be "well paid" given the potential risks to his career trajectory. He also believed that Hedges possessed the experience and style to trouble Brown. Following his win over Ducar, speculation surrounded a potential bout with Hedges, who entered the ring after the fight. Brown downplayed the prospect, stating that he had wanted the matchup earlier but believed "that ship's sailed" after negotiations failed to materialise. Instead, he wanted to pursue opportunities beyond the English title level, while adding that he retained "full respect" for Hedges. On 19 April, both boxers agreed on terms to fight one another after Brown was made mandatory. The fight was expected to take place on a Matchroom show. On 20 July, the fight was formally announced to take place at the Co-op Live in Manchester, on 19 September 2026, with the vacant British and Commonwealth cruiserweight titles on the line. Brown sent Hedges to the canvas twice in the sixth round with punches to the body, winning when his opponent failed to beat the referee's count after the second knockdown.

== Professional boxing record ==
7 fights	7 wins	0 losses
By knockout	7	0

No.	Result	Record	Opponent	Type	Round, time	Date	Location	Notes
7	Win	7–0	John Hedges	KO	6 (12), 2:36	19 Sep 2026	Co-op Live, Manchester, England	Retained WBA International and IBF Intercontinental cruiserweight titles; Won vacant British and Commonwealth cruiserweight titles
6	Win	6–0	Vasil Ducar	TKO	8 (10), 2:58	3 Apr 2026	Planet Ice, Altrincham, England	Won vacant WBA International and IBF Intercontinental cruiserweight titles
5	Win	5–0	Felix Valera	KO	2 (10), 1:31	1 Nov 2025	Caribe Royale Orlando, Florida, United States	
4	Win	4–0	Austine Nnamdi	TKO	2 (8), 1:51	13 Sep 2025	Windsor Park, Belfast, Northern Ireland	
3	Win	3–0	Lewis Oakford	TKO	1 (8), 2:06	5 Jul 2025	AO Arena, Manchester, England	
2	Win	2–0	Ivan Duka	KO	2 (6), 1:02	21 Jun 2025	bp pulse LIVE Arena, Birmingham, England	
1	Win	1–0	Federico Javier Grandone	TKO	4 (6), 0:55	28 Mar 2025	Planet Ice, Altrincham, England	
