= Marco McCullough =

Irish boxer (born 1989)

Marco McCullough (born 22 November 1989) is a Northern Irish former super-featherweight boxer. His career ran a total of 9 years, from 2011 to 2019 after his debut on 25 June 2011. In 2013, he defeated Willie Casey for the Boxing Union of Ireland featherweight title. McCullough defeated former world champion Dimitri Kirilov for the World Boxing Organization (WBO) European featherweight title. He has also won the intercontinental title for the World Boxing Organization (WBO). He lost to Isaac Lowe for the Commonwealth featherweight title.

McCullough lost to Ryan Walsh for the British featherweight title due to a technical knockout (TKO). Since his defeat to Ryan Wash, McCullough moved up to super-featherweight where he has won the IBO International Title and the IBF European Title, defeating Ruddy Encarnacion and Declan Geraghty respectively. McCullough's final official pro-boxing event was a victory against Declan Geraghty on 17 May 2019 via TKO for the Super Feather Title.

== Professional boxing record ==
22 Wins (12 Knockouts), 4 Losses, 0 Draws
Result	Record	Opponent	Type	Round	Date	Location	Notes
Win	1-0	(Republic of Ireland) Eddie Nesbitt	TKO	2 (4)	2011-06-25	(United Kingdom) Craigavon Leisure Centre, Craigavon, Northern Ireland	Professional debut.
Loss	1-1	(United Kingdom) Dai Davies	PTS	4	2011-09-10	(United Kingdom) Odyssey Arena, Belfast, Northern Ireland	
Win	2-1	(United Kingdom) Sean Watson	TKO	1 (4)	2012-04-14	(United Kingdom) Odyssey Arena, Belfast, Northern Ireland	
Win	3-1	(Bulgaria) Hyusein Hyuseinov	PTS	4	2012-09-08	(United Kingdom) Holiday Inn, Belfast, Northern Ireland	
Win	4-1	(Bulgaria) Valentin Marinov	KO	1 (4)	2012-10-13	(United Kingdom) Ulster Hall, Belfast, Northern Ireland	
Win	5-1	(Republic of Ireland) Michael Kelly	PTS	4	2012-12-01	(United Kingdom) Odyssey Arena, Belfast, Northern Ireland	
Win	6-1	(United Kingdom) Ibrar Riyaz	PTS	4	2013-02-09	(United Kingdom) Odyssey Arena, Belfast, Northern Ireland	
Win	7-1	(Republic of Ireland) Noel O'Brien	TKO	3 (8)	2013-05-14	(United Kingdom) City Hall, Belfast, Northern Ireland	
Win	8-1	(Republic of Ireland) Willie Casey	TKO	9 (10)	2013-10-19	(United Kingdom) Odyssey Arena, Belfast, Northern Ireland	Won Irish Featherweight Title
Win	9-1	(Slovakia) Elemir Rafael	TKO	3 (8)	2014-04-04	(United Kingdom) Odyssey Arena, Belfast, Northern Ireland	
Win	10-1	(Slovakia) Martin Parlagi	UD	10	2014-06-20	(United Kingdom) Waterfront Hall, Belfast, Northern Ireland	Won WBO European Featherweight Title
Win	11-1	(Russia) Dmitry Kirilov	RTD	8 (10)	2014-09-06	(United Kingdom) Titanic Quarter, Belfast, Northern Ireland	Defended WBO European Featherweight Title
Win	12-1	(Georgia (country)) Malkhaz Tatrishvili	TKO	1 (8)	2015-02-28	(United Kingdom) Odyssey Arena, Belfast, Northern Ireland	
Loss	12-2	(Hungary) Zoltan Kovacs	KO	1 (10)	2015-07-30	Sportpalast, Bielefeld, Germany	
Win	13-2	(Latvia) Sergejs Logins	TKO	1 (6)	2015-10-16	(United Kingdom) Meadowbank Sports Centre, Edinburgh, Scotland	
Win	14-2	(Spain) Sergio Prado	PTS	10	2015-10-16	(United Kingdom) Waterfront Hall, Belfast, Northern Ireland	
Loss	14-3	(United Kingdom) Isaac Lowe	TKO	8 (12)	2016-02-27	(United Kingdom) Manchester Arena, Manchester, England	Vacant Commonwealth Featherweight Title on the line
Win	15-3	(Lithuania) Simas Volosinas	PTS	6	2016-09-15	(United Kingdom) Crowne Plaza Hotel, Glasgow, Scotland	
Win	16-3	(Mexico) Luis Lugo	RTD	4 (10)	2016-11-05	(United Kingdom) Titanic Exhibition Centre, Belfast, Northern Ireland	Won the WBO Inter-Continental Featherweight Title
Win	17-3	(Nicaragua) Leonel Hernandez	PTS	8	2016-11-05	(United Kingdom) Waterfront Hall, Belfast, Northern Ireland	
Loss	17-4	(United Kingdom) Ryan Walsh	TKO	11 (12)	2017-05-20	(United Kingdom) Copper Box Arena, Hackney Wick, England	BBBofC British Featherweight Title at stake
Win	18-4	(United Kingdom) Josh Baillie	TKO	3 (6)	2017-11-18	(United Kingdom) The SSE Arena, Belfast, Northern Ireland	
Win	19-4	(Nicaragua) Arnoldo Solano	PTS	6	2018-04-21	(United Kingdom) The SSE Arena, Belfast, Northern Ireland	
Win	20-4	(United Kingdom) Jordan Ellison	PTS	6	2018-08-18	(United Kingdom) Windsor Park, Belfast, Northern Ireland	
Win	21-4	(Spain) Rudy Encarnacion	UD	10	2018-10-05	(United Kingdom) Titanic Exhibition Centre, Belfast, Northern Ireland	Won vacant IBO International Super-Featherweight Title
Win	22-4	(Republic of Ireland) Declan Geraghty	TKO	3 (10)	2019-05-17	(United Kingdom) Ulster Hall, Belfast, Northern Ireland	Won vacant IBF European Super-Featherweight Title
