= Ellis Zorro =

English boxer (born 1992)

Personal information
- Nationality: British
- Born: 5 October 1992 (age 34) Lewisham, London, England
- Height: 6 ft 2 in (1.88 m)
- Weight: Cruiserweight

Boxing career
- Reach: 75 in (191 cm)
- Stance: Orthodox

Boxing record
- Total fights: 23
- Wins: 18
- Win by KO: 7
- Losses: 5

Ellis Zorro (born 5 October 1992) is a British professional boxer. He held the WBO European cruiserweight title in 2023.

== Professional career ==
Zorro made his professional debut on 2 December 2017, defeating Jindrich Velecky in a four-round points victoryat York Hall in London.

On 14 May 2022, at the Boxxer Series cruiserweight tournament, Zorro defeated James Farrell and Jamie Smith in the quarterfinal and semifinal respectively, before defeating Ricky Reeves to win the tournament.

Zorro fought Hosea Burton for the vacant WBO European cruiserweight title at York Hall on 12 May 2023. He won the bout by seventh round technical knockout.

Returning once again to York Hall, he successfully defended the title with a unanimous decision win over Luca D'Ortenzi on 6 October 2023.

Zorro faced Jai Opetaia at Kingdom Arena in Riyadh, Saudi Arabia, on 23 December 2023, on the undercard of the at Anthony Joshua vs. Otto Wallin fight. Although it was originally set to be for the IBF cruiserweight title, Opetaia vacated the title after the IBF, which wanted him to rematch against former champion Mairis Briedis, refused to sanction the fight against Zorro. Zorro lost by knockout in the first round.

He took on Cheavon Clarke for the vacant British cruiserweight title at First Direct Arena in Leeds on 25 May 2024, but was knocked out in the eighth round.

Zorro faced Aloys Youmbi for the vacant WBC International cruiserweight title at the International Centre in Bournemouth on 26 July 2025. He lost by unanimous decision.

He challenged English cruiserweight champion John Hedges at Indigo at The O2 in London on 17 December 2025, losing via unanimous decision.

== Professional boxing record ==
23 fights	18 wins	5 losses
By knockout	7	2
By decision	11	3

No.	Result	Record	Opponent	Type	Round, time	Date	Location	Notes
23	Loss	18–5	Michiel Partoens	UD	8	28 Feb 2026	Sporthal Lago, Sint-Truiden, Limburg, Belgium	
22	Loss	18–4	John Hedges	UD	10	17 Dec 2025	Indigo at The O2, London, England	For English cruiserweight title
21	Loss	18–3	Aloys Youmbi	UD	10	26 Jul 2025	Bournemouth International Centre, Bournemouth, England	For vacant WBC International cruiserweight title
20	Win	18–2	Viktar Chvarkou	PTS	6	17 Apr 2025	BALLIN' Maidstone, Maidstone, England	
19	Loss	17–2	Cheavon Clarke	KO	8 (12), 2:59	25 May 2024	First Direct Arena, Leeds, England	For vacant British cruiserweight title
18	Loss	17–1	Jai Opetaia	KO	1 (12), 2:56	23 Dec 2023	Kingdom Arena, Riyadh, Saudi Arabia	For The Ring cruiserweight title
17	Win	17–0	Luca D'Ortenzi	UD	10	6 Oct 2023	York Hall, London, England	Retained WBO European cruiserweight title
16	Win	16–0	Hosea Burton	TKO	7 (10), 1:28	12 May 2023	York Hall, London, England	Won vacant WBO European cruiserweight title
15	Win	15–0	Dec Spelman	PTS	8	16 Sep 2022	York Hall, London, England	
14	Win	14–0	Ricky Reeves	UD	3	14 May 2022	Victoria Warehouse, Manchester, England	
13	Win	13–0	Jamie Smith	UD	3	14 May 2022	Victoria Warehouse, Manchester, England	
12	Win	12–0	James Farrell	UD	3	14 May 2022	Victoria Warehouse, Manchester, England	
11	Win	11–0	Ossie Jervier	KO	1 (6), 1:16	12 Feb 2022	Brentwood Centre, Brentwood, England	
10	Win	10–0	Tomislav Rudan	TKO	2 (6), 2:17	12 Nov 2021	York Hall, London, England	
9	Win	9–0	Ossie Jervier	PTS	6	14 Mar 2020	York Hall, London, England	
8	Win	8–0	Dmitrij Kalinovskij	PTS	6	30 Nov 2019	York Hall, London, England	
7	Win	7–0	Jan Hrazdira	TKO	5 (6), 2:52	7 Sep 2019	York Hall, London, England	
6	Win	6–0	Paweł Strykowski	TKO	1 (4), 1:56	29 Jun 2019	York Hall, London, England	
5	Win	5–0	Kent Kauppinen	PTS	4	9 Mar 2019	York Hall, London, England	
4	Win	4–0	Krisztian Harangi	TKO	1 (4), 1:45	1 Dec 2018	York Hall, London, England	
3	Win	3–0	Remigijus Ziausys	PTS	4	9 Sep 2018	York Hall, London, England	
2	Win	2–0	Toni Bilic	TKO	2 (4), 0:11	3 Mar 2018	York Hall, London, England	
1	Win	1–0	Jindrich Velecky	PTS	4	2 Dec 2017	York Hall, London, England	
