= Willie Casey =

Irish boxer

Personal information
- Nickname: Big Bang
- Nationality: Irish
- Born: Willie Casey; 20 December 1981 (age 44) Limerick, Ireland
- Height: 5 ft 5 in (165 cm)
- Weight: Super bantamweight

Boxing career

Boxing record
- Total fights: 19
- Wins: 16
- Win by KO: 10
- Losses: 3

Willie Casey (born 20 December 1981) is an Irish professional boxer who lives in Limerick, Ireland. He won the Prizefighter series in May 2010 in the super bantamweight division, defeating Mark Moran, Josh Wale and Paul McElhinney. He is nicknamed "Big Bang" for his aggressive and powerful boxing style.

Casey fought Paul Hyland at the University Arena in Limerick on 6 November 2010 for the European Super Bantamweight title which was previously held by Bernard Dunne. The original fight was supposed to be against Kiko Martinez who had held the title. However Martinez vacated the title citing a "rib injury" as the problem. Casey won the fight and was crowned European Super Bantamweight champion. On 2 February 2011 Casey was named Boxer of the Year at the Irish National Boxing Awards. Casey was then offered a fight with WBA World Super Bantamweight Title Guillermo Rigondeaux by Rigondeaux's manager Gary Hyde. Casey accepted this fight, thus relinquishing his European Super Bantamweight Title. The fight on 19 March 2011 was stopped with 22 seconds left in the 1st round, with Rigondeaux retaining his title. Willie Casey had a comeback fight on 17 September 2011 against veteran Frenchman Daniel Kodjo Sassau at the Kings Hall, Belfast, Northern Ireland. In the 7th round Casey dropped Sassou with a straight left cross and went on to win the fight with an 8th-round TKO.

== Professional boxing record ==
14 Wins (9 knockouts), 3 Losses, 0 Draws, 0 No Contests
Res.	Record	Opponent	Type	Round	Date	Location	Notes
Win	16-3	(Georgia (country)) George Gachechiladze	PTS	6(6)	6 September 2014	(United Kingdom) Titanic Quarter, Belfast, Northern Ireland	
Win	15-3	(Poland) Krzysztof Rogowski	PTS	6(6)	20 June 2014	(United Kingdom) Waterfront Hall, Belfast, Northern Ireland	
Loss	14-3	(Republic of Ireland) Marco McCullough	TKO	9(12)	19 November 2013	(United Kingdom) Odyssey Arena, Belfast, Northern Ireland	Irish Featherweight Title on the line.
Win	14-2	(United Kingdom) Jason Booth	UD	12(12)	15 July 2012	(United Kingdom) Stadium of Light, Sunderland, England	
Loss	13-2	(Norway) Andreas Evensen	MD	12(12)	21 April 2012	Arena Nord, Frederikshavn, Denmark	
Win	13-1	(Hungary) David Kanalas	TKO	1(8)	25 February 2012	Emerald House, Belfast, Northern Ireland	
Win	12-1	(France) Daniel Kodjo Sassou	TKO	3(8)	17 September 2011	Kings Hall, Belfast, Northern Ireland	
Loss	11-1	(Cuba) Guillermo Rigondeaux	TKO	1(12)	19 September 2011	(Republic of Ireland) Citywest Hotel, Dublin, Ireland	interim WBA World Super Bantamweight title on the line.
Win	11-0	(Republic of Ireland) Paul Hyland	TKO	4(12)	6 November 2010	(Republic of Ireland) University Arena, Limerick, Ireland	Won vacant EBU (European) Super Bantamweight title
Win	10-0	(Italy) Emiliano Salvini	PTS	8(8)	7 August 2010	(Republic of Ireland) Citywest Hotel, Dublin, Ireland	
Win	9-0	(France) Faycal Messaoudene	TKO	5(6)	26 June 2010	(Republic of Ireland) Neptune Sports Arena, Cork, Ireland	
Win	8-0	(United Kingdom) Paul McElhinney	UD	3(3)	29 May 2010	(United Kingdom) York Hall, Bethnal Green, London, UK	Prizefighter final.
Win	7-0	(United Kingdom) Josh Wale	SD	3(3)	29 May 2010	(United Kingdom) York Hall, Bethnal Green, London, UK	Prizefighter Semi-Final.
Win	6-0	(United Kingdom) Mark Moran	TKO	3(3)	29 May 2010	(United Kingdom) York Hall, Bethnal Green, London, UK	Prizefighter Quarter-Final.
Win	5-0	(Canada) Tyson Cave	TKO	8(8)	8 April 2010	Royal York Hotel, Toronto, Ontario, Canada	
Win	4-0	(Venezuela) Fernando Guevara	TKO	1(6)	13 February 2010	(Republic of Ireland) National Stadium, Dublin, Ireland	
Win	3-0	(United Kingdom) Michael O'Gara	TKO	6(6)	14 November 2009	(Republic of Ireland) University Arena, Limerick, Ireland	
Win	2-0	(Bulgaria) Stoyan Serbezov	PTS	6(6)	24 October 2009	(Republic of Ireland) National Stadium, Dublin, Ireland	
Win	1-0	(Brazil) Carlos De Jesus	TKO	2(4)	26 October 2008	(Republic of Ireland) Gleneagle Hotel, Killarney, Ireland	
