= John Hedges (boxer) =

English boxer (born 2002)

Personal information
- Nickname: The Gentleman
- Born: 11 April 2002 (age 24) Harlow, Essex, England
- Height: 6 ft 5 in (196 cm)
- Weight: Cruiserweight

Boxing career
- Stance: Southpaw

Boxing record
- Total fights: 13
- Wins: 12
- Win by KO: 3
- Losses: 1

John Hedges (born 11 April 2002) is an English professional boxer. He is a former English cruiserweight champion.

== Career ==
After an amateur career which saw him win 40 of his 44 bouts, Hedges turned professional in 2020 when he signed a promotional deal with Eddie Hearn led Matchroom Boxing.

He made his pro-debut at Marshall Arena in Milton Keynes on 4 October 2020, defeating Jan Ardon on points over four rounds.

Unbeaten in his first eight professional fights, Hedges stopped Erdogan Kadrija in the second of their scheduled eight-round contest at Indigo at The O2 in London on 10 February 2024.

In his next outing, he claimed the vacant Southern Area cruiserweight title with a unanimous technical decision win over the previously undefeated Lewis Oakford at the Copper Box Arena in London on 6 July 2024. On the advice of the ringside doctor, the referee stopped the fight after six rounds due to a cut above Oakford's left eye. At that point Hedges was ahead on all three judges' scorecards and was therefore declared the winner and new champion.

Having switched trainers from Mark Tibbs to former world champion and International Boxing Hall of Fame member Ricky Hatton, Hedges returned to the Copper Box Arena to face Nathan Quarless for the vacant English cruiserweight title on 17 May 2025. He won by unanimous decision.

Wearing a pair of sky blue gloves in tribute to Hatton who had died two months earlier, Hedges made the first defense of his title against Ellis Zorro at The O2 in London on 17 December 2025, winning via unanimous decision.

After vacating his English title, Hedges challenged WBA International and IBF Intercontinental cruiserweight champion, Pat Brown, at Co-op Live in Manchester on 19 September 2026, with the vacant British and Commonwealth cruiserweight titles also on the line. He was sent to the canvas twice in the sixth round by punches to his body, losing when he failed to beat the referee's count after the second knockdown.
