= Anthony Crolla vs. Jorge Linares =

Boxing match

Two Worlds Collide
- Date: 24 September 2016
- Venue: Manchester Arena, Manchester, England, UK
- Title(s) on the line: WBA and vacant The Ring lightweight titles

Tale of the tape
Boxer	Anthony Crolla	Jorge Linares
Nickname	"Million Dolla"	"El Niño de Oro"
Hometown	Manchester, England, UK	Barinas, Barinas, Venezuela
Pre-fight record	31–4–3 (13 KO)	40–3 (27 KO)
Age	29 years, 10 months	31 years, 1 month
Height	5 ft 8 1/2 in (174 cm)	5 ft 7 in (170 cm)
Weight	134 1/4 lb (61 kg)	134 lb (61 kg)
Style	Orthodox	Orthodox
Recognition	WBA; Lightweight Champion; The Ring; No. 3 Ranked Lightweight; TBRB; No. 5 Ranked Lightweight	WBC; Lightweight "Champion in Recess"; The Ring; No. 1 Ranked Lightweight; TBRB; No. 2 Ranked Lightweight; 3-division world champion

Result
- Linares defeats Crolla by unanimous decision

Anthony Crolla vs. Jorge Linares, billed as Two Worlds Collide, was a professional boxing match contested on 24 September 2016, for the WBA and The Ring lightweight championship.

== Background ==
After stopping Darleys Pérez to win the WBA lightweight belt in November 2015, Anthony Crolla had made one defence of his title, stopping Ismael Barroso the following May. Linares meanwhile had made two defences of the WBC belt he had won in December 2014, however a planned defence for April against mandatory Dejan Zlatičanin was cancelled after Linares suffered a fracture in his right hand. He was subsequently demoted to "Champion in recess".

On 15 June, it was announced on Sky Sports that a deal had been made for Crolla to fight Linares on 24 September at the Manchester Arena with both Crolla's WBA title and the vacant Ring Magazine belt would be on the line. Crolla, who was named Ring Magazine's Most Inspirational fighter of 2015, said it would be 'a dream come true' if he can beat Linares and claim the Ring Magazine title.

Speaking before the bout Crolla hoped to take advantage of the vulnerability Linares showed in his defence against Kevin Mitchell the previous year, saying "I’ve got to stamp my authority and gain that little bit of respect from him early on. I have got to be patient but it’s a very different fight from Ismael Barroso. Linares will be much smarter so I can’t be too patient. Certainly of late the shots to the body have been kind to us. It’s certainly part of my game but that’s not something I’ll be looking for straight away because he’s got a great team around him and they’ll have studied me. You’re going to see a bit of everything – a chess match at times and a bit of a brawling slugfest at times."

Crolla was a narrow 1 to 2 favourite to win.

== The fight ==
In front of the hometown crowd Crolla's pressure fighting was countered by Linares' unique style, hand speed and power punches in a close and competitive bout. Linares stunned the champion with a combination early in the 3rd, before getting warned for low blows in the 4th. Linares was cut over the left eye at the start of the 5th as Crolla backed Linares up and landed with left jabs and hooks.

Crolla was rocked in the 6th after a pair of clubbing overhand rights from Linares but the champion withstood the action and continued punching.

The fight went the distance and the judges scored the fight 115–114, 117–111 and 115–113 all in favour of Linares.

== Aftermath ==
Immediately after the fight, Linares offered Crolla a chance of a rematch, "I want to tell all the people thank you very much. We gave Manchester a beautiful fight and we can do it again. I hurt my hand in the sixth, and backed off a bit, in the 10th I told my corner I would close out the victory and I did and that's what got me the victory."

Speaking to BBC Radio 5 Live after the bout Crolla expressed disappointment "I am deeply disappointed. I have no complaints, but I am sorry I couldn't do it for this crowd. He's the best man I've ever been in a ring with, he's very fast and sharp and it was a pleasure to be in there with him. I gave it everything, it wasn't through a lack of trying, the difference was I took one or two hard counter-shots, which I was warned about by my team, and I paid the price. I am gutted, it's heart-breaking to lose the belt, but I will come back from this."

== Undercard ==
Confirmed bouts:

Winner	Loser	Weight division/title belt(s) disputed	Result
(United Kingdom) Jack Arnfield	(United Kingdom) John Ryder	WBA International Middleweight title	Unanimous decision
(United Kingdom) Callum Johnson	(Namibia) Willbeforce Shihepo	Commonwealth Light Heavyweight title	9th-round KO
(United Kingdom) Conor Benn	(United Kingdom) Ross Jameson	Light Welterweight (6 rounds)	Points decision
(United Kingdom) Hosea Burton	(Mexico) Fernando Castaneda Valdez	Light Heavyweight (10 rounds)	3rd-round TKO
Preliminary bouts
(United Kingdom) Nathan Wheatley	(United Kingdom) Dan Blackwell	Middleweight (4 rounds)	Points decision
(United Kingdom) Lyndon Arthur	(United Kingdom) Andy Neylon	Super Middleweight (4 rounds)	Points decision
(United Kingdom) Marcus Morrison	(France) Matiouze Royer	Middleweight (8 rounds)	1st-round KO
(United Kingdom) Isaac Lowe	(Nicaragua) Elvis Guillen	Featherweight (6 rounds)	Points decision
(United Kingdom) Mark Jeffers	(United Kingdom) Ben Heap	Middleweight (4 rounds)	Points decision
(United Kingdom) Liam Conroy	(France) Baptiste Castegnaro	Light Heavyweight (6 rounds)	Points decision

== Broadcasting ==
Country	Broadcaster
Hungary	Sport 1
Latin America	Canal Space
Panama	RPC Channel 4
United States	AWE
United Kingdom	Sky Sports

Preceded by vs. Ismael Barroso	Anthony Crolla's bouts 24 September 2016	Succeeded by Rematch
Preceded by vs. Ivan Cano	Jorge Linares's bouts 24 September 2016	Succeeded by Rematch
