= Emiliano Marsili =

Italian boxer (born 1976)

Personal information
- Nickname: Tizzo
- Nationality: Italian
- Born: Emiliano Marsili; August 11, 1976 (age 49) Civitavecchia, Italy
- Height: 5 ft 6 1/2 in (169 cm)
- Weight: Lightweight

Boxing career
- Stance: Southpaw

Boxing record
- Total fights: 44
- Wins: 43
- Win by KO: 16
- Losses: 1
- Draws: 1

Emiliano Marsili (born 11 August 1976) is an Italian professional boxer. He held the IBO lightweight title in 2012 and was European lightweight champion from 2013 to 2015.

== Professional career ==
Marsili made his professional debut on 31 May 2003 defeating Claudiu Pop on points in Civitavecchia, Lazio.

He won the vacant IBO lightweight title by stopping Derry Mathews in the seventh round at Olympia in Liverpool, England, on 20 January 2012.

Marsili faced Luca Giacon for the vacant EBU lightweight title at Palasport in Civitavecchia on 9 March 2013, winning via technical knockout in round two. He held the championship for two years, making four successful defenses, before vacating it.

He was set to fight Dejan Zlatičanin for the vacant WBC lightweight title at Turning Stone Resort & Casino in Verona, New York, USA, on 11 June 2016, but withdrew because of illness.

After more than 20 years undefeated, spanning 43 fights with the only blemish on his record being a solitary draw in 2006, Marsili lost his first professional fight when he retired due to a shoulder injury at the end of the eighth round against Gavin Gwynne in a bout for the vacant European lightweight title at York Hall in London, England, on 1 December 2023. He was leading on two of the judges' scorecards when he pulled out.

== Professional boxing record ==
45 fights	43 wins	1 loss
By knockout	16	1
By decision	26	0
By disqualification	1	0
Draws	1	

No.	Result	Record	Opponent	Type	Round, time	Date	Location	Notes
45	Win	43–1–1	Eber Tobar	PTS	10	2024-9-27	Civitavecchia, Lazio, Italy	
44	Loss	42–1–1	Gavin Gwynne	RTD	8 (12)	2023-12-01	York Hall, London, England, U.K.	For vacant European lightweight title
43	Win	42–0–1	Fabrizio Ferreri	TKO	2 (8)	2022-12-10	Santa Marinella, Italy	
42	Win	41–0–1	Frank Urquiaga	SD	12 (12)	2022-04-01	Palasport, Santa Marinella, Italy	Won vacant European Union lightweight title
41	Win	40–0–1	Stephane Jamoye	UD	10 (10)	2021-06-25	Civitavecchia, Italy	Won vacant IBO Mediterranean lightweight title
40	Win	39–0–1	Emiliano Salvini	UD	6 (6)	2020-10-11	Civitavecchia, Italy	
39	Win	38–0–1	Brayan Mairena	UD	6 (6)	2019-07-11	Stadio Nicola Pietrangeli, Roma, Italy	
38	Win	37–0–1	Milan Delic	TKO	5 (6)	2018-12-15	Teatro Principe, Milan, Italy	
37	Win	36–0–1	Victor Betancourt	TD	7 (12)	2018-02-23	Palasport Viale Tiziano, Roma, Italy	
36	Win	35–0–1	Zoltan Szabo	UD	8 (8)	2017-06-11	Teatro Principe, Milan, Italy	
35	Win	34–0–1	Aristides Pérez	UD	12 (12)	2016-12-10	PalaGeorge, Montichiari, Italy	Won vacant WBA Inter-Continental lightweight title
34	Win	33–0–1	Yordan Vasilev	PTS	8 (8)	2016-07-23	Palasport, Valenza, Italy	
33	Win	32–0–1	Gamaliel Díaz	UD	12 (12)	2015-08-01	Stadio Comunale Cetorelli, Fiumicino, Italy	Won vacant WBC Silver lightweight title
32	Win	31–0–1	Gyorgy Mizsei Jr.	TKO	7 (12)	2015-01-24	Palasport Piscine Italcementi, Bergamo, Italy	Retained European lightweight title
31	Win	30–0–1	Gyorgy Mizsei Jr.	UD	12 (12)	2014-09-27	PalaMalè, Viterbo, Italy	Retained European lightweight title
30	Win	29–0–1	Benoit Manno	TKO	6 (12)	2014-06-07	Palasport, Tolfa, Italy	Retained European lightweight title
29	Win	28–0–1	Pasquale Di Silvio	UD	12 (12)	2014-01-25	Palasport, Tolfa, Italy	Retained European lightweight title
28	Win	27–0–1	David Kis	KO	3 (6)	2013-11-02	Montalto di Castro, Italy	
27	Win	26–0–1	Luca Giacon	TKO	2 (12)	2013-03-09	Palasport, Civitavecchia, Italy	Won vacant European lightweight title
26	Win	25–0–1	Luis Garcia	UD	6 (6)	2012-09-28	Centro Sportivo Tordiquinto, Roma, Italy	
25	Win	24–0–1	Derry Mathews	TKO	7 (12)	2012-01-20	Olympia, Liverpool, England, U.K.	Won vacant IBO lightweight title
24	Win	23–0–1	Paolo Gassani	KO	1 (10)	2011-07-24	Civitavecchia, Italy	
23	Win	22–0–1	Pasquale Di Silvio	PTS	10 (10)	2010-11-27	Palasport, Civitavecchia, Italy	
22	Win	21–0–1	Luca Marasco	TKO	9 (10)	2010-05-21	Palasport San Filippo, Brescia, Italy	
21	Win	20–0–1	Zsolt Nagy	PTS	6 (6)	2010-02-05	PalaTenda, Fuscaldo, Italy	
20	Win	19–0–1	Giuseppe Facente	KO	8 (10)	2009-05-23	Civitavecchia, Italy	Won vacant WBC Mediterranean lightweight title
19	Win	18–0–1	Mohammed Ali Cherif	TKO	2 (6)	2009-03-31	Palasport, Pisa, Italy	
18	Win	17–0–1	Bela Sandor	PTS	6 (6)	2008-12-02	Palasport, Pisa, Italy	
17	Win	16–0–1	Sylvain Chapelle	PTS	6 (6)	2008-04-04	PalaMalè, Viterbo, Italy	
16	Win	15–0–1	Roman Rafael	DQ	3 (6)	2008-03-15	Palasport, Pisa, Italy	
15	Win	14–0–1	Sandor Fekete	PTS	6 (6)	2007-12-15	Palasport, Santa Marinella, Italy	
14	Win	13–0–1	George Grosu	PTS	6 (6)	2007-09-15	Civitavecchia, Italy	
13	Win	12–0–1	Jean Gomis II	TKO	3 (6)	2007-04-20	Civitavecchia, Italy	
12	Draw	11–0–1	Giovanni Niro	SD	10 (10)	2006-11-17	Palasport, Grosseto, Italy	
11	Win	11–0	Julius Rafael	TKO	1 (6)	2006-08-01	Forte Michelangelo, Civitavecchia, Italy	
10	Win	10–0	Lubos Priehradnik	TKO	5 (6)	2006-03-10	Palasport, Bergamo, Italy	
9	Win	9–0	Miro Dicky	TKO	2 (6)	2005-09-10	Civitavecchia, Italy	
8	Win	8–0	Ambroz Horvath	TKO	2 (6)	2005-05-20	Palazzetto dello Sport, Santa Marinella, Roma, Italy	
7	Win	7–0	Eric Patrac	PTS	6 (6)	2004-12-21	Palazzetto dello Sport, Sabaudia, Latina, Italy	
6	Win	6–0	Philippe Meheust	PTS	6 (6)	2004-11-13	PalaBrera, San Martino Siccomario, Italy	
5	Win	5–0	Anton Vontszemu	PTS	4 (4)	2004-07-24	Civitavecchia, Italy	
4	Win	4–0	Veselin Dimitrov Vasilev	PTS	6 (6)	2004-05-08	Civitavecchia, Italy	
3	Win	3–0	Fatah Boukhenoufa	PTS	6 (6)	2004-03-13	Manerba del Garda, Desenzano, Italy	
2	Win	2–0	Miro Dicky	PTS	6 (6)	2003-12-09	PalaLido, Milan, Italy	
1	Win	1–0	Claudiu Pop	PTS	4 (4)	2003-05-31	Civitavecchia, Italy	

== See also ==
- List of southpaw stance boxers

Sporting positions
Regional boxing titles
Vacant Title last held by Gavin Rees	EBU Lightweight champion March 9, 2013 – 2015; Vacated	Vacant Title next held by Edis Tatli
Minor World boxing titles
Vacant Title last held by Lenny Zappavigna	IBO Lightweight champion January 20, 2012 – 2012; Vacated	Vacant Title next held by Daud Yordan
