= Liam Conroy =

English boxer (born 1992)

Personal information
- Born: 17 July 1992 (age 33) Barrow-in-Furness, England
- Height: 6 ft 1 in (185 cm)
- Weight: Middleweight, Light-heavyweight

Boxing career
- Reach: 73 in (185 cm)
- Stance: Orthodox

Boxing record
- Total fights: 26
- Wins: 18
- Win by KO: 9
- Losses: 7
- Draws: 1

Liam Conroy (born 17 July 1992) is an English former professional boxer. He was English light-heavyweight champion from 2017 to 2018 and challenged for the British title in the same weight division in 2019.

== Professional career ==
Conroy made his professional debut a De Veres White Hotel in Bolton on 22 June 2012, scoring a fourth round technical knockout victory over Danny Brown.

He won the English light-heavyweight by stopping defending champion Joel McIntyre in the second round at York Hall in London on 9 September 2017.

Conroy successfully defended his title with a ninth round stoppage of Chris Hobbs at The Venue in Birmingham on 1 December 2017 and a second round technical knockout win over Miles Shinkwin at Preston Guild Hall on 31 March 2018.

Almost a year later, after recovering from a hernia problem, Conroy faced Joshua Buatsi for the vacant British light-heavyweight title at the Copper Box Arena in London on 23 March 2019, losing by stoppage in the third round.

He fought Steven Ward for the vacant WBO European light-heavyweight title at Ulster Hall in Belfast on 21 June 2019. The bout was halted in the eighth round because of a cut Ward sustained during an accidental clash of heads. At that stage, all three ringside judges' scorecards had Conroy behind by 75–76, meaning he lost the contest via unanimous technical decision.

Conroy's final fight was on 25 June 2021, back at the same venue where he had his pro-debut, De Veres White Hotel in Bolton, against Hosea Burton in a final eliminator for a shot at the British light-heavyweight title. He was knocked out in the sixth round.

== Professional boxing record ==
| 26 fights | 18 wins | 7 losses |
|---|---|---|
| By knockout | 9 | 4 |
| By decision | 9 | 3 |
| Draws | 1 | |

| No. | Result | Record | Opponent | Type | Round, time | Date | Location | Notes |
|---|---|---|---|---|---|---|---|---|
| 26 | Loss | 18–7–1 | (United Kingdom) Hosea Burton | KO | 6 (12), 1:44 | 25 Jun 2021 | (United Kingdom) Bolton Whites Hotel, Bolton, England | |
| 25 | Loss | 18–6–1 | (Germany) Serge Michel | TKO | 4 (10), 1:39 | 30 Sep 2020 | (United Kingdom) York Hall, London, England | The Golden Contract: light-heavyweight – semi-final |
| 24 | Win | 18–5–1 | (United Kingdom) Andre Sterling | UD | 10 | 14 Dec 2019 | (United Kingdom) Brentwood Centre, Brentwood, England | The Golden Contract: light-heavyweight – quarter-final |
| 23 | Loss | 17–5–1 | (Republic of Ireland) Steven Ward | TD | 8 (10) | 21 Jun 2019 | (United Kingdom) Ulster Hall, Belfast, Northern Ireland | For vacant WBO European light-heavyweight title; Technical decision due to Ward suffering cut from accidental clash of heads in round two |
| 22 | Win | 17–4–1 | (United Kingdom) Elvis Dube | TKO | 2 (6) | 11 May 2019 | (United Kingdom) Brentwood Centre, Brentwood, England | |
| 21 | Loss | 16–4–1 | (United Kingdom) Joshua Buatsi | TKO | 3 (12) | 23 Mar 2019 | (United Kingdom) Copper Box Arena, London, England | For vacant British light-heavyweight title |
| 20 | Win | 16–3–1 | (United Kingdom) Miles Shinkwin | TKO | 2 (10) | 31 Mar 2018 | (United Kingdom) Preston Guild Hall, Preston, England | Retained English light-heavyweight title |
| 19 | Win | 15–3–1 | (United Kingdom) Chris Hobbs | TKO | 9 (10) | 1 Dec 2017 | (United Kingdom) The Venue, Birmingham, England | Retained English light-heavyweight title |
| 18 | Win | 14–3–1 | (United Kingdom) Joel McIntyre | TKO | 2 (10) | 9 Sep 2017 | (United Kingdom) York Hall, London, England | Won English light-heavyweight title |
| 17 | Win | 13–3–1 | (United Kingdom) Steve Cooper | TKO | 9 (10) | 27 May 2017 | (United Kingdom) Bowlers Exhibition Centre, Manchester, England | Won vacant Northern Area light-heavyweight title |
| 16 | Win | 12–3–1 | (United Kingdom) Yailton Neves | TKO | 2 (6) | 4 Mar 2017 | (United Kingdom) Park Hall Hotel, Chorley, England | |
| 15 | Win | 11–3–1 | (France) Baptiste Castegnaro | PTS | 6 | 24 Sep 2016 | (United Kingdom) Manchester Arena, Manchester, England | |
| 14 | Win | 10–3–1 | (Hungary) Ferenc Albert | TKO | 4 (10) | 18 Jun 2016 | (United Kingdom) Preston Guild Hall, Preston, England | Won vacant WBC Youth Silver light-heavyweight title |
| 13 | Win | 9–3–1 | (Poland) Krzysztof Golec | PTS | 8 | 20 Feb 2016 | (United Kingdom) Preston Guild Hall, Preston, England | |
| 12 | Win | 8–3–1 | (United Kingdom) Elvis Dube | PTS | 4 | 12 Sep 2015 | (United Kingdom) Evoque Nightclub, Preston, England | |
| 11 | Draw | 7–3–1 | (United Kingdom) Mitch Mitchell | PTS | 4 | 28 Mar 2015 | (United Kingdom) Evoque Nightclub, Preston, England | |
| 10 | Loss | 7–3 | (United Kingdom) Cello Renda | TKO | 1 (3) | 14 Feb 2015 | (United Kingdom) Winter Gardens, Blackpool, England | Prizefighter: The Middleweights III - Quarter-finals |
| 9 | Win | 7–2 | (United Kingdom) Haldar Sadik | TKO | 1 (4) | 14 Dec 2014 | (United Kingdom) Bolton Whites Hotel, Bolton, England | |
| 8 | Loss | 6–2 | (United Kingdom) Max Maxwell | PTS | 6 | 21 Jun 2014 | (United Kingdom) Bowlers Exhibition Centre, Manchester, England | |
| 7 | Win | 6–1 | (Poland) Robert Studzinski | PTS | 6 | 8 Mar 2014 | (United Kingdom) Bowlers Exhibition Centre, Manchester, England | |
| 6 | Win | 5–1 | (United Kingdom) Gary Cooper | PTS | 6 | 20 Sep 2013 | (United Kingdom) Bowlers Exhibition Centre, Manchester, England | |
| 5 | Win | 4–1 | (United Kingdom) Duane Green | PTS | 6 | 1 Jun 2013 | (United Kingdom) Bowlers Exhibition Centre, Manchester, England | |
| 4 | Win | 3–1 | (United Kingdom) Kieron Gray | PTS | 6 | 8 Mar 2013 | (United Kingdom) Bowlers Exhibition Centre, Manchester, England | |
| 3 | Loss | 2–1 | (United Kingdom) Gilson de Jesus | PTS | 6 | 7 Dec 2012 | (United Kingdom) Bowlers Exhibition Centre, Manchester, England | |
| 2 | Win | 2–0 | (United Kingdom) Dan Blackwell | PTS | 4 | 12 Oct 2012 | (United Kingdom) Bowlers Exhibition Centre, Manchester, England | |
| 1 | Win | 1–0 | (United Kingdom) Danny Brown | TKO | 4 (4) | 22 Jun 2012 | (United Kingdom) De Vere Whites Hotel, Bolton, England | |
