= Eurasian Boxing Parliament =

Sporting organisation

- Abbreviation: EBP
- Formation: 2015
- Type: Non-profit Institution
- Purpose: Boxing sanctioning organisation
- Headquarters: Moscow, Russia
- Region served: Eurasia
- Members: IBF
- President: Mikhail Denisov
- Website: www.ebpboxing.com

The Eurasian Boxing Parliament (EBP) is a professional boxing organisation that sanctions bouts in various countries within Eurasia.

== Affiliation ==
The Eurasian Boxing Parliament is affiliated with and a member organization of the International Boxing Federation (IBF).

== Belt ==
The EBP belt is created by using the latest computerized laser technology with an external 24-carat gold-layered coating.

== Current champions ==
As of 4 December 2019

Weight class:	Champion:	Reign began:	Days
Strawweight	vacant		
Light-flyweight	vacant		
Flyweight	vacant		
Super-flyweight	vacant		
Bantamweight	vacant		
Super-bantamweight	vacant		
Featherweight	vacant		
Super-featherweight	Erzhan Turgumbekov (RUS)	24 August 2019	2634
Lightweight	Pavel Malikov (RUS)	12 October 2019	2585
Super-lightweight	Eduard Troyanovsky (RUS)	14 November 2019	2552
Welterweight	Alexander Besputin (RUS)	30 November 2019	2536
Super-welterweight	Bakhram Murtazaliev (RUS)	2 November 2019	2564
Middleweight	Magomed Madiev (RUS)	22 July 2019	2667
Super-middleweight	Evgeny Shvedenko (RUS)	11 October 2019	2586
Light-heavyweight	Ricards Bolotniks (LAT)	12 October 2019	2585
Cruiserweight	Ruslan Fayfer (RUS)	30 November 2019	2536
Heavyweight	Vladyslav Sirenko (UKR)	12 October 2019	2586

== Former champions ==
- Sergey Kovalev - former EBP (Super) light-heavyweight champion
- Yury Kashinsky - former EBP cruiserweight champion
- Umar Salamov - former EBP light-heavyweight champion
- Maksim Vlasov - former EBP light-heavyweight champion
- Aram Amirkhanyan - former EBP super-welterweight champion
- Georgi Chelokhsaev - former EBP super-lightweight champion
- Eduard Troyanovsky - former EBP super-lightweight champion
- Mark Urvanov - former EBP super-featherweight champion

== Member countries ==
- Afghanistan
- Albania
- Armenia
- Austria
- Belarus
- Belgium
- Bosnia and Herzegovina
- Croatia
- Czech Republic
- East Timor
- Estonia
- Georgia
- Germany
- India
- Indonesia
- Iran
- Kazakhstan
- Kyrgyzstan
- Laos
- Latvia
- Lithuania
- Macedonia
- Moldova
- Mongolia
- Netherlands
- Pakistan
- Philippines
- Poland
- Russia
- Serbia
- Slovenia
- South Korea
- Sri Lanka
- Switzerland
- Tajikistan
- Thailand
- Turkey
- Uzbekistan
- Vietnam

== See also ==
- List of boxing organisations
