= Yvan Mendy =

French boxer (born 1985)

Personal information
- Nickname: The Lion
- Nationality: French
- Born: 21 May 1985 (age 41) Paris, France
- Height: 5 ft 8 1/2 in (174 cm)
- Weight: Lightweight; Light-welterweight

Boxing career
- Reach: 70 in (178 cm)
- Stance: Orthodox

Boxing record
- Total fights: 58
- Wins: 49
- Win by KO: 22
- Losses: 7
- Draws: 1
- No contests: 1

Yvan Mendy (born 21 May 1985) is a French professional boxer of Senegalese descent.

== Professional career ==
In June 2013, a year after unsuccessfully taking on Viktor Postol for the WBC International Silver super lightweight title, Mendy won the French lightweight title for the first time, beating Marvin Petit. He went on to defend this title four times before trying to become European champion.

In April 2015 Mendy fought Edis Tatli for the vacant EBU (European) lightweight title and was defeated by unanimous decision.

On December 12, 2015, Mendy recorded a split-decision victory over Olympic gold medalist Luke Campbell on the undercard of Anthony Joshua vs. Dillian Whyte.

Mendy fought Sam Noakes for the vacant European lightweight title at York Hall in London, England, on 20 April 2024, losing by unanimous decision.

== Professional boxing record ==
58 fights	49 wins	7 losses
By knockout	22	0
By decision	27	7
Draws	1	
No contests	1	

No.	Result	Record	Opponent	Type	Round, time	Date	Location	Notes
58	Win	49–7–1 (1)	Maycol Escobar	UD	6	7 Dec 2024	Gymnase la Salamandre, Pont-Sainte-Maxence, France	
57	Loss	48–7–1 (1)	Sam Noakes	UD	12	20 Apr 2024	York Hall, London, England	
56	Win	48–6–1 (1)	Bastien Ballesta	SD	12	11 May 2023	Palais des Sports, Castelnau-le-Lez, France	Won IBF International super lightweight title
55	Loss	47–6–1 (1)	Denys Berinchyk	UD	12	3 Dec 2022	Tottenham Hotspur Stadium, London, England	Lost EBU European lightweight title; For WBO International lightweight title
54	Win	47–5–1 (1)	Gianluca Ceglia	UD	12	30 Apr 2022	Gymnase la Salamandre, Pont-Sainte-Maxence, France	Won vacant EBU European lightweight title
53	Win	46–5–1 (1)	Miguel Cesario Antin	UD	8	5 Dec 2020	Palais des sports Marcel Cerdan, Levallois-Perret, France	
52	Win	45–5–1 (1)	Alain Christian Sangue	UD	8	17 Oct 2020	Palais des sports Marcel Cerdan, Levallois-Perret, France	
51	Win	44–5–1 (1)	Jaider Parra	KO	6 (12)	13 Dec 2019	Palais des sports Marcel Cerdan, Levallois-Perret, France	
50	Win	43–5–1 (1)	Diego Fabian Eligio	UD	12	18 Jul 2019	Theatre du Tivoli, Le Cannet, France	Retained WBA Inter-Continental lightweight title
49	Win	42–5–1 (1)	Hakim Ben Ali	TKO	8 (12)	28 Mar 2019	Zenith de Lille, Lille, France	Won vacant WBA Inter-Continental lightweight title
48	Win	41–5–1 (1)	Achiko Odikadze	TKO	6 (8)	26 Jan 2019	Gymnase la Salamandre, Pont-Sainte-Maxence, France	
47	Loss	40–5–1 (1)	Luke Campbell	UD	12	22 Sep 2018	Wembley Stadium, London, England	
46	Win	40–4–1 (1)	Jesus Arevalo	KO	8 (12)	14 Dec 2017	Palais des Sport Marcel Cerdan, Levallois-Perret, France	Retained WBC Silver lightweight title
45	Win	39–4–1 (1)	Florian Montels	UD	10	12 Oct 2017	Sud de France Arena, Pérols, France	
44	Win	38–4–1 (1)	Javier Jose Clavero	UD	12	26 Jun 2017	La Salamandre, Pont-Sainte-Maxence, France	Won vacant WBC Silver lightweight title
43	Win	37–4–1 (1)	Juan Ocura	UD	10	26 Mar 2017	Palais des sports Marcel Cerdan, Levallois-Perret, France	
42	Win	36–4–1 (1)	Massimiliano Ballisai	KO	5 (12)	10 Nov 2016	Halle Georges Carpentier, Paris, France	Won vacant IBF Inter-Continental lightweight title
41	Win	35–4–1 (1)	Francesco Patera	UD	12	13 May 2016	Salle Leo Lagrange, Pont-Sainte-Maxence, France	Won vacant European Union lightweight title
40	Win	34–4–1 (1)	Samir Kasmi	TKO	9 (12)	12 Mar 2016	Palais des sports, Levallois-Perret, France	Retained WBC International lightweight title
39	Win	33–4–1 (1)	Luke Campbell	SD	12	12 Dec 2015	Millennium Dome, London, England	Won WBC International lightweight title
38	Win	32–4–1 (1)	Reynaldo Mora	TKO	3 (6)	03 Oct 2015	Gymnase Royallieu, Compiègne, France	
37	Win	31–4–1 (1)	Felix Lora	UD	6	13 Jun 2015	Cirque d'Hiver, Paris, France	
36	Loss	30–4–1 (1)	Edis Tatli	UD	12	25 Apr 2015	Hartwall Arena, Helsinki, Finland	For vacant European lightweight title
35	Win	30–3–1 (1)	Aboubeker Bechelaghem	UD	10	31 Oct 2014	Gymnase Michel Monard, Breuil-le-Sec, France	Retained France lightweight title
34	Win	29–3–1 (1)	Sebastien Benito	TKO	2 (10)	15 May 2014	Parc des Sports et Loisirs, Pont-Audemer, France	Retained French lightweight title
33	Win	28–3–1 (1)	Sylvain Chapelle	UD	10	17 Jan 2014	Salle Leo Lagrange, Pont-Sainte-Maxence, France	Retained French lightweight title
32	Win	27–3–1 (1)	Sebastien Benito	TKO	8 (10)	22 Nov 2013	Gymnase Michel Monard, Breuil-le-Sec, France	Retained French lightweight title
31	Win	26–3–1 (1)	Marvin Petit	UD	10	14 Jun 1013	Salle Marcel Cerdan, Poissy, France	Won French lightweight title
30	Loss	25–3–1 (1)	Viktor Postol	UD	12	27 Jun 2012	Club Sportlife, Kyiv, Ukraine	For WBC Intercontinental Silver super lightweight title
29	Win	25–2–1 (1)	Denis Farias	RTD	2 (8)	4 May 2012	Palais des Sport Marcel Cerdan, Levallois-Perret, France	
28	Win	24–2–1 (1)	Nugzar Margvelashvili	PTS	6	11 Feb 2012	Salle Marcel Cerdan, Thourotte, France	
27	Win	23–2–1 (1)	Tarik Madni	KO	4 (12)	16 Dec 2011	Salle Marcel Cerdan, Thourotte, France	Retained WBO Intercontinental super lightweight title
26	Win	22–2–1 (1)	Mladen Zivkov	TKO	3 (6)	12 Nov 2011	Salle Edouard Pinchon, Thourotte, France	
25	Loss	21–2–1 (1)	Abdoulaye Soukouna	UD	10	18 Jun 2011	Salle Marcel Cerdan, Thourotte, France	For France super lightweight title
24	Draw	21–1–1 (1)	Abdoulaye Soukouna	SD	10	1 Apr 2011	Salle Leo Lagrange, Pont-Sainte-Maxence, France	For France super lightweight title
23	Win	21–1 (1)	Sam Rukundo	UD	12	10 Dec 2010	Salle Leo Lagrange, Pont-Sainte-Maxence, France	Retained WBO Intercontinental super lightweight title
22	Win	20–1 (1)	Peter McDonagh	UD	12	4 Jun 2010	Salle Leo Lagrange, Pont-Sainte-Maxence, France	Won vacant WBO Intercontinental super lightweight title
21	Win	19–1 (1)	Beka Sajaia	KO	5 (8)	2 Apr 2010	Salle Leo Lagrange, Pont-Sainte-Maxence, France	
20	Win	18–1 (1)	Bismarck Alfaro	PTS	6	26 Feb 2010	Salle Leo Lagrange, Pont-Sainte-Maxence, France	
19	Win	17–1 (1)	Almin Kovacevic	DQ	5 (8)	11 Dec 2009	Salle Leo Lagrange, Pont-Sainte-Maxence, France	
18	Win	16–1 (1)	Konstantins Sakara	TKO	4 (8)	6 Nov 2009	Salle Leo Lagrange, Pont-Sainte-Maxence, France	
17	Win	15–1 (1)	Araik Sachbazjan	PTS	6	5 June 2009	Salle Leo Lagrange, Pont-Sainte-Maxence, France	
16	Win	14–1 (1)	Marian Cazacu	PTS	6	18 Apr 2009	Elispace, Beauvais, France	
15	Win	13–1 (1)	Kirkor Kirkorov	TKO	2 (6)	3 Apr 2009	Salle Leo Lagrange, Pont-Sainte-Maxence, France	
14	Loss	12–1 (1)	Abdoulaye Sokouna	UD	6	17 May 2008	Salle Albert Camus, Criel, France	
13	Win	12–0 (1)	Wladimir Borov	PTS	6	4 Apr 2008	Salle Leo Lagrange, Pont-Sainte-Maxence, France	
12	Win	11–0 (1)	Abendi Aalam	PTS	6	29 May 2007	Parc des Sports, Pont-Audemer, France	
11	NC	10–0 (1)	Mourad Sabry El Malki	NC	3 (6)	11 May 2007	Salle Leo Lagrange, Pont-Sainte-Maxence, France	
10	Win	10–0	Lubomir Wejs	KO	2 (6)	16 Mar 2007	Salle Leo Lagrange, Pont-Sainte-Maxence, France	
9	Win	9–0	Akim Mehadji	TKO	3 (6)	24 Feb 2007	Salle Marie-José Peréc, Fourmies, France	
8	Win	8–0	Alexis Wernet	TKO	2 (6)	30 Jan 2007	Salle Leo Lagrange, Pont-Sainte-Maxence, France	
7	Win	7–0	Mohamed Boulakhras	PTS	6	15 Dec 2006	Salle Leo Lagrange, Pont-Sainte-Maxence, France	
6	Win	6–0	Tibor Rafael	TKO	3 (6)	17 Nov 2006	Salle Marcel Coene, Montataire, France	
5	Win	5–0	Krasimir Dimitrov	TKO	1 (4)	17 June 2006	Salle Pierre de Coubertin, Beauvais, France	
4	Win	4–0	Milan Rybar	TKO	4	3 June 2006	Montataire, France	
3	Win	3–0	Veselin Vasilev	PTS	4	19 May 2006	Gymnase Georges Buffenoir, Rivery, France	
2	Win	2–0	Mahamadou Traore	PTS	4	29 Apr 2006	Salle Leo Lagrange, Pont-Sainte-Maxence, France	
1	Win	1–0	Faisal Bahache	TKO	2 (4)	25 Mar 2006	Soissons, France	
