= Reece Mould =

English boxer (born 1994)

Personal information
- Born: 17 October 1994 (age 31) Doncaster, Yorkshire, England
- Height: 5 ft 7 in (170 cm)
- Weight: Featherweight, Lightweight

Boxing career
- Stance: Orthodox

Boxing record
- Total fights: 25
- Wins: 21
- Win by KO: 6
- Losses: 4

Reece Mould (born 17 October 1994) is an English professional boxer. He is a former two-time English champion, having been title holder at featherweight and lightweight. Mould has also held the WBA Continental lightweight championship and challenged for the British featherweight title.

== Career ==
A professional since 2016 and unbeaten in his first 11 bouts, Mould stopped Sean Davis in the fourth round to claim the vacant English featherweight title at Doncaster Racecourse on 22 June 2019.

He faced Leigh Wood for the vacant British featherweight title at Wembley Arena in London on 13 February 2021, losing by stoppage in the ninth round.

Moving up to lightweight, Mould became a two-time English champion when he defeated the previously unbeaten Hamed Ghaz by unanimous decision for the vacant title at the Magna Centre in Rotherham on 10 February 2023, also collecting the WBA Continental lightweight championship at the same time.

He lost his WBA Continental crown to Gary Cully at 3Arena in Dublin on 25 November 2023, going down to a split decision defeat. One of the ringside judges scored the fight 97–93 in his favour but was overruled by his two colleagues who had it 97–93 and 96–93 respectively for his opponent.

Mould faced Lewis Sylvester for the vacant IBO Continental lightweight title at the Eco-Power Stadium in Doncaster on 23 May 2025. He lost by split decision with one judge seeing the contest 96–94 for him while the other two favoured Sylvester by scores of 97–93 and 96–94 respectively.

He got back to winning ways in his next outing, defeating Benito Sanchez Garcia on points over six rounds at Park Community Arena in Sheffield on 27 September 2025.
