= Paul Hyland (boxer) =

Irish boxer (born 1984)

Personal information
- Nationality: Irish
- Born: Paul Hyland; 19 November 1984 (age 41) Dublin, Ireland
- Height: 1.7 m (5 ft 7 in)
- Weight: Super bantamweight

Boxing career
- Stance: Orthodox

Boxing record
- Total fights: 23
- Wins: 21
- Win by KO: 6
- Losses: 2
- Draws: 0
- No contests: 0

Paul Hyland, (born 19 November 1984 in Dublin, Ireland) is an Irish professional boxer. Hyland is a two-time Irish Professional Super Bantamweight Champion and European Union Champion. Hyland also boxed World Title Challenger Willie Casey for the EBU (European) Title.

== Professional career ==
=== Début ===
Hyland turned professional on 5 November 2004 in Hereford Leisure Centre, England on an undercard of bill that included Jason Cook, Jason McKay and Scott Gammer. In his début Hyland defeated fellow débutant Hungarian Janos Garai with a second-round TKO knockout.

=== Irish title ===
He is the former two time Irish super bantamweight title holder, defeating Marc Callaghan on 5 July 2008. Hyland won this bout on a point score of 98–93. Hyland's second time winning the Irish super bantamweight title was on 5 December in the National Stadium, Dublin, Ireland. This time Hyland won on a 3rd round too win over Eugene Heagney. Hyland dropped Heagney with a combination of punches to body and head in third round, then a burst of punches from Hyland after the eight count brought the referee's intervention.
