= Hairon Socarras =

Cuban boxer

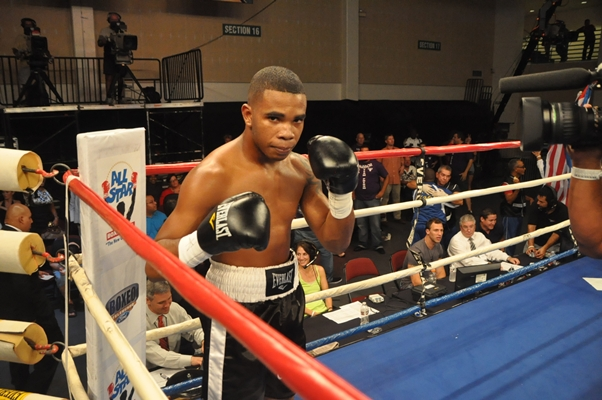
- Socarras in 2011

Personal information
- Nickname: El Maja
- Nationality: (Cuba) Cuban
- Born: Hairon Socarras; January 29, 1993 (age 33) Havana
- Height: 5 ft 6 in (1.68 m)
- Weight: Super Bantamweight

Boxing career
- Reach: 68"
- Stance: orthodox

Boxing record
- Total fights: 28
- Wins: 23
- Win by KO: 15
- Losses: 2
- Draws: 3

Hairon 'El Maja' Socarrás (born January 29, 1993) is a Cuban professional boxer from La Lisa, Havana. He arrived from Cuba at age of 11 in the United States with Amateur experience from La ESPA in which he represented the city of Artemisa.

== Professional career ==
Socarras made his pro debut on February 25, 2011, against American-born Carlos Bruno who was also making his pro debut. After a few rabbit punches by Socarras he knocked Bruno out cold in the first round with a perfect left hook.

2 months later on April 29, 2011, he faced Puerto Rican Kenneth Calvente who was also making his pro debut. Calvente lasted the first round, but the young Socarras started pressuring Calvente on the ropes until he dropped Calvente with a straight right hand. After the knockdown Socarras again trapped Calvente in the corner and landed another straight right handed that wobbled Calvente, the referee waved off the fight giving Socarras another TKO victory.

On June 24, 2011, Socarras made his debut in Miami against Anthony Fraguada at the Dade County Auditorium. The fight barely lasted 2 minutes, as Socarras floored Fraguada with a left hook that finished him off, prompting the referee to stop the fight.

On August 28, 2011, Socarras faced Eduardo Melendez of Puerto Rico. After Melendez landed a few punches to Socarras, the young fighter started to trap Melendez in the corner with body shots. Late in the round Socarras landed a clean left hook clean on Melendez's chin that knocked him out cold. Many have agreed in boxing sites that this knockout is a candidate for KO of the year and put Socarras on the Prospect to watch list.

On October 14 Socarras fought against Lamar Charlton. The fight was declared a split draw.

Socarras returned to the ring after 10 months of no activity, to be exact on August 18, 2012, in the Double Tree Hotel. He faced DeWayne Wisdom and beat him via Unanimous Decision to improve his professional record at 5–0 with 4 KO's.

On January 4, 2013, he faced up-and-coming Josh Bowles with a record of 6–0 at the Magic City Casino in Miami FL. Socarras won the bout by 3rd-round KO to improve to 6 and 0.

Socarras was back in action on March 23, 2013, to face Sergio Montes de Oca. In the first round Socarras knocked de Oca down, winning the fight clearly via Unanimous Decision, with a cut over his left eye from an accidental headbutt from De Oca. Hairon Socarras improved his record to 7–0.

On March 22, 2014, he won the vacant WBA Latino super bantamweight belt after scoring an impressive fourth-round knockout over Dominican, Aneudy Matos. The fight was held at the Carlos ‘Teo’ Cruz Coliseum in Santo Domingo.
