= Derek Chisora vs. Otto Wallin =

2025 Boxing match

The Last Dance
- Date: 8 February 2025
- Venue: Co-op Live, Manchester, UK

Tale of the tape
Boxer	Derek Chisora	Otto Wallin
Nickname	War	All In
Hometown	Finchley, London, UK	Sundsvall, Västernorrland, Sweden
Pre-fight record	35–13 (23 KO)	27–2 (1) (15 KO)
Age	41 years, 1 month	34 years, 2 months
Height	6 ft 2 in (188 cm)	6 ft 5 1/2 in (197 cm)
Weight	259 1/2 lb (118 kg)	239 lb (108 kg)
Style	Orthodox	Southpaw
Recognition	WBC; No. 20 Ranked Heavyweight; IBF; No. 9 Ranked Heavyweight; WBO; No. 14 Ranked Heavyweight	WBC; No. 10 Ranked Heavyweight; IBF; No. 12 Ranked Heavyweight; WBO; No. 11 Ranked Heavyweight

Result
- Chisora wins via 12–round unanimous decision (117–109, 114–112, 116–110)

Derek Chisora vs. Otto Wallin, billed as The Last Dance, was a professional boxing match contested between Derek Chisora, and Otto Wallin. The fight was an International Boxing Federation (IBF) "eliminator", with the winner becoming the number two contender for the IBF heavyweight title, held at the time by Daniel Dubois. The bout took place on 8 February 2025 at the Co-op Live, with Chisora winning by unanimous decision.

== Background ==
Chisora regained composure following a loss against Fury in 2022, scoring back-to-back unanimous decision victories over Gerald Washington in 2023 and Joe Joyce in 2024. Wallin regained composure following a loss against Joshua in 2023, securing a 1st-round KO over Onoriode Ehwarieme in 2024.

On 17 October 2024, Jarrell Miller told BoxingScene.com that he would fight Chisora at an arena in Manchester on 8 February 2025. He said, "That's the biggest one we're talking about right now – Chisora. It's not locked in yet; the deal's not signed yet. But there are definitely talks. In November, it was reported that Chisora would face Miller in Manchester, England on 8 February 2025. It was later announced that the fight against Miller fell through. Miller posted via his Instagram account it was Salita Promotions who caused the fight to fall apart after saying Chisora was ready to finalise. According to Miller, his contract with Salita Promotions had expired but said they exercised their first and last right of refusal. Salita later replied stating it was Miller who eventually turned down the fight.

On 27 November 2024, Wallin was announced as a replacement to fight Chisora. Wallin, who was also promoted by Salita, was given the opportunity after Miller was dropped. The pair went face-to-face at a press conference the next day. The fight was billed was 'The Last Dance', hinting Chisora's retirement. Chisora had recently said he wanted to have 50 professional fights. The fight with Wallin would be his 49th in the pro ranks. Wallin said he was there to win, "I'm here to fight and here to win and that's all. I don't worry so much about The Last Dance and all that, this is my time. You're gonna get stopped." Chisora responded, "There's nothing you've got that I haven't tasted in my life. I don't believe you've got the power to bother me. Even the biggest punchers have not bothered me, so, you know, don't worry, I've got fear of you but it gives me that motivation to train harder. I'm definitely going to come for you." Lead promoter Frank Warren said the winner would be locked in to a big fight later in the year.

In the lead-up, the match was elevated as an IBF "eliminator", with the winner becoming the number two contender for the IBF heavyweight title.

== Fight details ==
From the opening bell, Chisora adopted a forward-pressing style, applying pressure behind a high guard and seeking to engage at close range. Wallin responded with lateral movement and counterpunching, using his jab to maintain distance and disrupt Chisora’s rhythm. Wallin found early success in the second round, landing clean shots while evading sustained exchanges. However, Chisora’s relentless pace began to shift momentum in rounds three and four, as he landed heavier blows and forced Wallin into defensive positions. A cut beneath Chisora’s right eye emerged in the fourth round, but did not appear to affect his aggression. In the middle rounds, Chisora continued to dictate the pace, crowding Wallin and landing clubbing shots to the body and head. Wallin’s movement became less effective under sustained pressure, and his output diminished as Chisora’s physicality took its toll. An accidental clash of heads in round five resulted in cuts under both of Chisora’s eyes, prompting a brief ringside inspection in round six, though the bout was allowed to continue. Chisora’s work rate remained high, and a barrage of punches in round eight left Wallin visibly shaken, with the referee closely monitoring the action. In round nine, Chisora landed a decisive overhand right that dropped Wallin, inflicting the first knockdown of Wallin's career. Wallin rose and attempted to rally in the tenth and eleventh rounds, landing sporadic counters as Chisora showed signs of fatigue. However, Chisora regained control in the final round, scoring a second knockdown with another overhand right in the closing seconds. All three judges unanimously scored the fight in favour of Chisora, with scores of 117–109, 114–112 and 116–110.

== Aftermath ==
Following Chisora's win, in the post-fight interview, Chisora asked the fans to stay in the arena, inviting his amateur trainer, John Oliver into the ring to thank him for his guidance when he was starting his amateur career, and as he had prepared to ask them the question of who he should fight next. He had members of his team hold up three posters, one each of Usyk, Joshua and Dubois. The former two of which got the loudest crowd reactions. He said, "You tell me, I think I've earned number 50. A big blockbuster, please. So you tell me."

Chisora, was named mandatory challenger for the IBF heavyweight title, and ordered to face Dubois, and Wallin, announced he was linking up with new trainer Ronnie Shields, ahead of his return to the ring.

== Fight card ==
Confirmed bouts:

Weight Class		vs.		Method	Round	Time	Notes
Heavyweight	Derek Chisora	def.	Otto Wallin	UD	12
Featherweight	Zak Miller	def.	Masood Abdulah (c)	MD	12		^{Note 1}
Light-welterweight	Jack Rafferty (c)	def.	Reece MacMillan	TKO	7/12	1:37	^{Note 2}
Light-heavyweight	Zach Parker	def.	Mickael Diallo	UD	10
Middleweight	Nathan Heaney	vs.	Sofiane Khati	NC	7/10	1:08	^{Note 3}
Heavyweight	Lewis Williams	def.	Cristian Uwaka	PTS	4
Middleweight	Walter Fury	def.	Joe Hardy	PTS	4
Middleweight	Joe Cooper	def.	Artjom Spatar	PTS	4
Super-featherweight	Jermaine Dhliwayo	def.	Mark Butler	PTS	4

^Note 1 For Commonwealth and vacant British featherweight titles
^Note 2 For British, Commonwealth, and WBC International Silver light-welterweight titles
^Note 3 Originally a technical knockout win for Khati; changed to a no contest due to Khati failing a drug test

== Broadcasting ==
Country	Broadcaster
Country	Cable/Pay TV
United Kingdom	TNT Sports

Preceded by vs. Joe Joyce	Derek Chisora's bouts 8 February 2025	Succeeded by vs. Deontay Wilder
Preceded by vs. Onoriode Ehwarieme	Otto Wallin's bouts 8 February 2025	Succeeded by Chris Thomas
