= Zelfa Barrett =

English boxer (born 1993)

Personal information
- Nickname: Brown Flash
- Born: 9 July 1993 (age 33) Harpurhey, Manchester, England
- Height: 5 ft 3 in (160 cm)
- Weight: Super-featherweight; Lightweight

Boxing career
- Reach: 68 in (173 cm)
- Stance: Orthodox

Boxing record
- Total fights: 39
- Wins: 36
- Win by KO: 19
- Losses: 3

Zelfa Barrett (born 9 July 1993) is an English professional boxer. He challenged for the IBF super-featherweight title in 2022. Barrett is a former European and English super-featherweight champion.

== Professional career ==
Barrett made his professional debut on 25 October 2014 at the Middleton Arena in Middleton, Greater Manchester, scoring a four-round points decision victory over Kristian Laight.

After winning his first 18 fights, 11 by stoppage, he fought Chris Conwell for the vacant English super-featherweight title at the First Direct Arena, Leeds. Barrett won the fight with a fourth-round technical knockout (TKO) to capture the English title. Barrett dropped Conwell twice in round four, with the end coming at 2:20 after Conwell was unable to beat the referee's count of 10 following a left hook to the body.

His next fight came against Ronnie Clark for the vacant IBF European super-featherweight title on 24 February 2018 at the York Hall, London. Barrett lost the fight by majority decision over 12 rounds. Following a tentative opening round, the fight livened up in round two with Barrett electing to fight at range and having success to the body, while Clark came forward to work on the inside. The next few rounds saw much of the same; Barrett throwing punches from range and Clark forcing the pace to work at close quarters. After being warned for a low blow, Barrett was dropped to the canvas 1 minute into the sixth-round by a straight left-right uppercut combination from southpaw Clark. Barrett was on the back foot for the next minute, evading and blocking punches with the occasional hook and uppercut landing. Barrett began firing back with success in the closing minute of the round. In the second half of the fight, Clark began to show signs of fatigue which allowed Barrett to land his combinations at range with more frequency, with Clark still continuing to press the action and land single shots to make the rounds evenly contested. Two judges scored the bout 116–111 in favour of Clark while the third scored it a draw at 114–114.

Following two consecutive wins over journeyman Edwin Tellez, he then fought Lyon Woodstock on 15 June 2019 for the vacant Commonwealth super-featherweight title at the First Direct Arena, winning via unanimous decision. Two judges scored the bout 117–111 while the third scored it 118–110.

The first defence of his title came on 12 October 2019 against Jordan McCorry at the First Direct Arena. In a fight that saw McCorry lose a point for hitting after the bell at the end of the eighth, he was dropped three times; firstly in the third-round resulting from a left hook to the body; again in the eighth from a right hand to the body; and finally in the ninth-round from an uppercut, causing referee Steve Gray to wave the fight off at 1:43 into the round to see Barrett retain his title with a ninth-round TKO.

Barrett was booked to face the unbeaten Eric Donovan for the vacant IBF Inter-Continental junior-lightweight title on 14 August 2020, at the Matchroom Fight Camp in Brentwood, England. He won the fight by an eight-round technical knockout. Barrett made his first title defense against the former two-weight IBF champion Kiko Martínez on 13 February 2021. He won the fight by unanimous decision with scores of 118–111, 118–111 and 116–113.

Barrett faced the veteran Viorel Simion on 14 August 2021. Simion retired from the fight at the end of the fourth round. Barrett next faced Bruno Tarimo in an IBF super featherweight title eliminator on 18 December 2021. He won the fight by unanimous decision, with scores of 117–110, 117–110 and 116–111.

He won the vacant European super-featherweight title with a unanimous decision success over Faroukh Kourbanov at Motorpoint Arena in Cardiff on 4 June 2022.

With just five weeks notice, Barrett took on Shavkat Rakhimov for the vacant IBF super-featherweight title at the Etihad Arena in Abu Dhabi on 5 November 2022. He knocked his opponent to the canvas in round three but was himself floored twice in the ninth round with the referee stopping the contest after the second knockdown.

He returned to action on 22 April 2023, defeating Jason Sanchez via unanimous decision at the Motorpoint Arena in Cardiff.

Barrett faced Jordan Gill at Manchester Arena on 13 April 2024, winning the fight by technical knockout in the 10th round.

On 15 February 2025 at the Co-op Live Arena in Manchester, Barrett lost to Jazza Dickens by unanimous decision.

Barrett fought Gavin Gwynne for the vacant WBA Intercontinental lightweight title at Wembley Arena in London on 14 November 2026. He won by technical knockout in the fifth round.

== Personal life ==
Barrett comes from a fighting family, being a cousin of former Commonwealth light-heavyweight champion Lyndon Arthur, and nephew to former British and European champion and world title challenger, Pat Barrett, who is also his trainer. He is also a cousin of former Manchester United left-back Brandon Williams.

On Christmas Day in 2011, Barrett's older cousin, John, was attacked at a private party held at Sinclair's Bar in Rochdale, Greater Manchester. He died the following day from a single stab wound to the back.

== Professional boxing record ==
39 fights	36 wins	3 losses
By knockout	19	1
By decision	17	2

No.	Result	Record	Opponent	Type	Round, time	Date	Location	Notes
39	Win	36–3	Gavin Gwynne	TKO	5 (12), 2:33	14 Nov 2026	Wembley Arena, London, England	Won vacant WBA Intercontinental lightweight title
38	Win	35–3	Owen Durnan	PTS	6	18 Jul 2026	Kings Hall, Stoke-on-Trent, England	
37	Win	34–3	Liam Dillon	PTS	8	29 Nov 2025	National Exhibition Centre, Birmingham, England	
36	Win	33–3	Ramiro Garcia Lopez	PTS	6	2 Jul 2025	DIY Kitchens Stadium, Wakefield, England	
35	Win	32–3	Cristian Bielma	TKO	3 (8), 1:39	7 Jun 2025	Whites Hotel, Bolton, England	
34	Loss	31–3	Jazza Dickens	UD	10	15 Feb 2025	Co-op Live Arena, Manchester, England	
33	Win	31–2	Jordan Gill	TKO	10 (12), 2:44	13 Apr 2024	Manchester Arena, Manchester	
32	Win	30–2	Costin Ion	PTS	8	25 Nov 2023	3Arena, Dublin, Ireland	
31	Win	29–2	Jason Sanchez	UD	12	22 Apr 2023	Motorpoint Arena, Cardiff, Wales	
30	Loss	28–2	Shavkat Rakhimov	TKO	9 (12), 2:35	5 Nov 2022	Etihad Arena, Abu Dhabi, United Arab Emirates	For vacant IBF super-featherweight title
29	Win	28–1	Faroukh Kourbanov	UD	12	4 Jun 2022	Motorpoint Arena, Cardiff, Wales	Won European super-featherweight title
28	Win	27–1	Bruno Tarimo	UD	12	18 Dec 2021	Manchester Arena, Manchester, England	
27	Win	26–1	Viorel Simion	RTD	4 (8), 3:00	14 Aug 2021	Matchroom Fight Camp, Brentwood, England	
26	Win	25–1	Kiko Martínez	UD	12	13 Feb 2021	The SSE Arena, London, England	Retained IBF Inter-Continental super-featherweight title
25	Win	24–1	Eric Donovan	TKO	8 (10), 1:35	14 Aug 2020	Matchroom Fight Camp, Brentwood, England	Won vacant IBF Inter-Continental super-featherweight title
24	Win	23–1	Jordan McCorry	TKO	9 (12), 1:43	12 Oct 2019	First Direct Arena, Leeds, England	Retained Commonwealth super-featherweight title
23	Win	22–1	Lyon Woodstock	UD	12	15 Jun 2019	First Direct Arena, Leeds, England	Won vacant Commonwealth super-featherweight title
22	Win	21–1	Edwin Tellez	TKO	2 (6), 2:22	27 Apr 2019	Leisure Centre, Oldham, England	
21	Win	20–1	Edwin Tellez	PTS	8	9 Jun 2018	Manchester Arena, Manchester, England	
20	Loss	19–1	Ronnie Clark	MD	12	24 Feb 2018	York Hall, London, England	For vacant IBF European super-featherweight title
19	Win	19–0	Chris Conwell	KO	4 (10), 2:20	21 Oct 2017	First Direct Arena, Leeds, England	Won vacant English super-featherweight title
18	Win	18–0	Jordan Ellison	TKO	1 (10), 2:22	29 Jul 2017	Bowlers Exhibition Centre, Manchester, England	
17	Win	17–0	Eusebio Osejo	PTS	10	19 May 2017	Whites Hotel, Bolton, England	
16	Win	16–0	Ross Jameson	TKO	6 (6), 2:43	8 Apr 2017	Manchester Arena, Manchester, England	
15	Win	15–0	Reynaldo Cajina	KO	3 (6) 2:25	24 Feb 2017	Middleton Arena, Middleton, England	
14	Win	14–0	Rafael Castillo	RTD	4 (6), 3:00	17 Dec 2016	Newcastle Racecourse, Newcastle, England	
13	Win	13–0	Elvis Guillen	TKO	1 (8), 1:10	22 Oct 2016	Whites Hotel, Bolton, England	
12	Win	12–0	Reynaldo Mora	TKO	4 (6), 2:39	17 Sep 2016	Victoria Warehouse, Manchester, England	
11	Win	11–0	Damian Lawniczak	TKO	4 (6), 0:40	2 Jul 2016	Leisure Centre, Oldham, England	
10	Win	10–0	Chris Adaway	TKO	2 (6), 1:49	13 May 2016	Whites Hotel, Bolton, England	
9	Win	9–0	Damian Lawniczak	PTS	6	12 Mar 2016	Echo Arena, Liverpool, England	
8	Win	8–0	Aron Szilagyi	TKO	4 (6), 2:19	5 Mar 2016	Middleton Arena, Middleton, England	
7	Win	7–0	Ismail Anwar	TKO	2 (6), 2:50	31 Oct 2015	Castle Leisure Centre, Bury, England	
6	Win	6–0	Kristian Laight	PTS	4	19 Sep 2015	Liverpool Olympia, Liverpool, England	
5	Win	5–0	Ibrar Riyaz	PTS	4	30 May 2015	Middleton Arena, Middleton, England	
4	Win	4–0	Jamie Quinn	PTS	4	28 Mar 2015	Middleton Arena, Middleton, England	
3	Win	3–0	Jamie Quinn	PTS	4	31 Jan 2015	Middleton Arena, Middleton, England	
2	Win	2–0	Joe Beeden	KO	1 (4), 0:52	13 Dec 2014	Sports Centre, Oldham, England	
1	Win	1–0	Kristian Laight	PTS	4	25 Oct 2014	Middleton Arena, Middleton, England	
