= Michael Magnesi =

Italian boxer (born 1994)

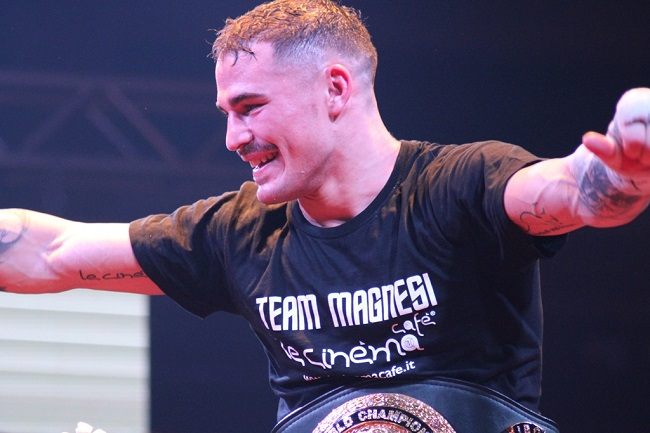
- Michael Magnesi wins the IBO world belt

Personal information
- Nickname: Lone Wolf
- Born: 18 November 1994 (age 31) Palestrina, Italy
- Height: 5 ft 6 in (168 cm)
- Weight: Super-featherweight

Boxing career
- Stance: Orthodox

Boxing record
- Total fights: 28
- Wins: 26
- Win by KO: 13
- Losses: 3

Michael Magnesi (born 18 November 1994) is an Italian professional boxer. He held the IBO super-featherweight title from November 2020 to September 2022.

== Professional career ==
Magnesi made his professional debut on 10 October 2015, scoring a four-round points decision (PTS) victory against Carmelo Palermo at Palasport V.le Tiziano in Rome, Italy.

After compiling a record of 11–0 (4 KOs), he defeated Francesco Invernizio via third-round technical knockout (TKO), capturing the vacant Italian super-featherweight title on 30 June 2018 at the Piazza Dante in Grosseto, Italy.

He retained the title with a unanimous decision (UD) victory against Giuseppe Carafa in November, before defeating Ruddy Encarnacion via fourth-round corner retirement (RTD) on 24 March 2019 in Rome, capturing the vacant IBF Mediterranean super-featherweight title.

He next defeated Emanuel López via tenth-round knockout (KO) on 21 June, capturing the vacant WBC International Silver super-featherweight title at the Parco della Pace in Rome.

Following a stoppage victory against Maxwell Awuku in a non-title fight in October, Magnesi won his third regional title on 29 February 2020 after defeating Breilor Teran via fourth-round RTD to capture the vacant IBO Inter-Continental super-featherweight title at the Tiburtina TV Studios in Rome.

In his next fight he faced Patrick Kinigamazi for the vacant IBO super-featherweight title on 27 November 2020 in Fondi, Italy. Magnesi knocked Kinigamazi to the floor in the third round en route to a fifth-round KO victory.

Magnesi lost the title to Anthony Cacace via split decision at Manchester Arena in England on 24 September 2022.

He faced Ryan Garner for the vacant interim WBC super-featherweight title at St Mary's Stadium in Southampton, England, on 20 June 2026. Magnesi lost via unanimous decision.

== Professional boxing record ==
29 fights	26 wins	3 losses
By knockout	13	1
By decision	13	2

No.	Result	Record	Opponent	Type	Round, time	Date	Location	Notes
29	Loss	26–3	Ryan Garner	UD	12	20 Jun 2026	St Mary's Stadium, Southampton, England	For vacant interim WBC super-featherweight title
28	Win	26–2	Marcos Gabriel Martinez	PTS	8	27 Feb 2026	Palasport, Cave, Italy	
27	Win	25–2	Khalil El Hadri	UD	12	28 Mar 2025	Valmontone, Italy	Won WBC Silver super-featherweight title
26	Win	24–2	Kevin Trana	PTS	8	26 Oct 2024	Tolfa, Italy	
25	Loss	23–2	Masanori Rikiishi	TKO	12 (12), 2:34	22 Mar 2024	Palazzetto Romboli, Colleferro, Italy	Lost WBC Silver super-featherweight title
24	Win	23–1	Nike Theran	UD	12	27 Oct 2023	Federbocce, Rome, Italy	Retained WBC Silver super-featherweight title
23	Win	22–1	Ayrton Osmar Gimenez	UD	12	31 Mar 2023	Valmontone, Italy	Won vacant WBC Silver super-featherweight title
22	Loss	21–1	Anthony Cacace	SD	12	24 Sep 2022	Manchester Arena, Manchester, England	Lost IBO super-featherweight title
21	Win	21–0	Dennis Contreras	TKO	5 (12), 0:59	9 Apr 2022	Palasport, Civitavecchia, Italy	Retained IBO super-featherweight title
20	Win	20–0	Eugene Lagos	TKO	3 (10), 1:56	11 Nov 2021	Paramount Theatre, Huntington, New York, US	
19	Win	19–0	Khanyile Bulana	TKO	1 (12), 0:47	23 Apr 2021	Palazzetto Valle Martella, Zagarolo, Italy	Retained IBO super-featherweight title
18	Win	18–0	Patrick Kinigamazi	KO	5 (12), 2:32	27 Nov 2020	Palasport, Fondi, Italy	Won vacant IBO super-featherweight title
17	Win	17–0	Breilor Teran	RTD	4 (10), 3:00	29 Feb 2020	Studios TV via Tiburtina, Rome, Italy	Won vacant IBO Inter-Continental super-featherweight title
16	Win	16–0	Maxwell Awuku	RTD	6 (12), 3:00	26 Oct 2019	Ragusa Off, Rome, Italy	
15	Win	15–0	Emanuel López	KO	10 (12), 2:15	21 Jun 2019	Parco della Pace, Rome, Italy	Won vacant WBC International Silver super-featherweight title
14	Win	14–0	Ruddy Encarnacion	RTD	4 (10), 3:00	24 Mar 2019	Roma Convention Center La Nuvola, Rome, Italy	Won vacant IBF Mediterranean super-featherweight title
13	Win	13–0	Giuseppe Carafa	UD	10	10 Nov 2018	Palasport, Cave, Italy	Retained Italian super-featherweight title
12	Win	12–0	Francesco Invernizio	TKO	3 (10), 2:43	30 Jun 2018	Piazza Dante, Grosseto, Italy	Won vacant Italian super-featherweight title
11	Win	11–0	Baska Tuvdenlhagva	PTS	8	15 Oct 2017	Piazza Giordano Bruno, Cave, Italy	
10	Win	10–0	Dionisie Tiganas	PTS	6	17 Jun 2017	Casino de la Vallee, Saint-Vincent, Italy	
9	Win	9–0	Milan Delic	TKO	2 (6)	3 Dec 2016	Colleferro, Italy	
8	Win	8–0	Milan Savic	PTS	6	22 Oct 2016	Rome, Italy	
7	Win	7–0	Zeljko Kovacevic	TKO	5 (6)	24 Jun 2016	Nettuno, Italy	
6	Win	6–0	Nemanja Sabljov	PTS	4	30 Apr 2016	Palasport, Fiumicino, Italy	
5	Win	5–0	Riccardo Battisti	PTS	6	17 Apr 2016	Cave, Italy	
4	Win	4–0	Ciprian Albert	PTS	6	28 Feb 2016	Palasport, Nettuno, Italy	
3	Win	3–0	Valerio Mazzulla	KO	1 (6), 0:52	19 Dec 2015	Polivalente Azzurri d'Italia, Brescia, Italy	
2	Win	2–0	Davide Bono	KO	2 (4)	14 Nov 2015	Palestra Testudo, Cernusco sul Naviglio, Italy	
1	Win	1–0	Carmelo Palermo	PTS	4	10 Oct 2015	Palasport V.le Tiziano, Rome, Italy	

Sporting positions
Regional boxing titles
Vacant Title last held by Alessandro Micheli	Italian super-featherweight champion 30 June 2018 – April 2019	Vacant Title next held by Giuseppe Carafa
Vacant Title last held by Floriano Pagliara	IBF Mediterranean super-featherweight champion 24 March 2019 – June 2019	Vacant
Vacant Title last held by Martin Joseph Ward	WBC International Silver super-featherweight champion 29 February 2020 – November 2020	Vacant Title next held by Jorge Castaneda
Vacant Title last held by Malcolm Klassen	IBO Inter-Continental super-featherweight champion 29 February – 27 November 2020; Won world title	Vacant Title next held by Bruno Tarimo
Minor world boxing titles
Vacant Title last held by Shavkat Rakhimov	IBO super-featherweight champion 27 November 2020 – present	Incumbent
