= Chris Pearson (boxer) =

American boxer

Personal information
- Nickname: Sweet Pea
- Born: Chris Pearson; November 12, 1990 (age 35) Dayton, Ohio, USA
- Height: 5 ft 10 in (1.78 m)
- Weight: Middleweight
- Website: sweetpearson.com

Boxing career
- Stance: Southpaw

Boxing record
- Total fights: 21
- Wins: 17
- Win by KO: 12
- Losses: 3
- Draws: 0
- No contests: 1

Chris Pearson (born November 12, 1990) is a former American amateur boxer and currently a professional boxer in the Middleweight division. He signed a professional managerial contract with Al Haymon to launch his pro career, whose stable of fighters includes Floyd Mayweather Jr., Jermain Taylor and Paul Williams.

== Amateur career ==
A southpaw with a 93-8 amateur record, Pearson was the 2009 Police Athletic League national champion and now has beaten four former Olympians, including Brazil’s Yamaguichi Florentino, a veteran of over 150 fights, and Bakhyt Sarsekbayev of Kazakhstan, the 2008 Beijing Games welterweight gold medalist — both of whom he conquered in Los Angeles. Pearson spent two and a half months in Los Angeles fighting for the L.A. Matadors, a team of select amateurs who competed in the newly formed World Series of Boxing.

He was also the:

- U.S. National Amateur Middleweight Champion, sweeping his bracket.
- 2-time Silver Gloves Champ
- 4-time Jr Golden Gloves Champ
- 8-time State Fair Champ
- Jr Olympic Bronze Medalist
- Ringside World Champion
- National PAL Champion

== Professional career ==
Pearson secured himself the perfect professional debut at U.S. Bank Arena in Cincinnati on November 26, 2011. It was on the undercard of Adrien Broner versus Vicente Martin Rodriguez for the recently vacated WBO super featherweight crown. He knocked out opponent Steven Chadwick within the opening two minutes of the first round.

On February 25, 2012, he made quick work of Jeremy Wood (1-5, 1 KO) stopping his fellow Ohioan in one round, on the non-televised undercard of the HBO Boxing After Dark show headlined by Devon Alexander-Marcos Maidana.

As of May 2019, his professional record is 19-2.

== Professional boxing record ==
17 Wins (12 knockout, 5 decision), 3 Losses, 0 Draws, 1 No Contests
| Result | Record | Opponent | Type | Round | Date | Location | Notes |
| Win | 12-0 | (United States) Steve Martinez | SD | 10 | 2014-12-12 | Illusions Theater in San Antonio, Texas, United States | |
| Win | 11-0 | (United States) Lanardo Tyner | SD | 8 | 2014-02-28 | Turning Stone Resort & Casino in Verona, New York, United States | |
| Win | 10–0 | (Brazil) Acacio Joao Ferreira | KO | 1 (4), 1:44 | 2013-12-06 | Little Creek in Shelton, Washington, United States | |
| Win | 9–0 | (United States) Josh Williams | TKO | 1 (4), 1:14 | 2013-09-13 | MGM Grand in Las Vegas, Nevada, United States | |
| Win | 8–0 | (United States) Arturo Crespin | TKO | 1 (4), 1:14 | 2013-7-19 | Staples Center in Las Vegas, Nevada, United States | |
| Win | 7–0 | (United States) Yosamani Abreu | RTD | 1 (4), 3:00 | 2012-11-10 | Sports Arena in Los Angeles, California, United States | |
| Win | 6–0 | (United States) Jeremy Marts | KO | 1 (4), 0:44 | 2012-11-10 | Staples Center in Los Angeles, California, United States | |
| Win | 5–0 | (United States) Christian Nava | TKO | 1 (4), 0:55 | 2012-02-25 | Scottrade Center in Saint Louis, Missouri, United States | |
| Win | 4–0 | (United States) Ángel Hernández | TKO | 1 (4), 0:55 | 2012-02-25 | Scottrade Center in Saint Louis, Missouri, United States | |
| Win | 3–0 | (United States) Jeremy Wood | TKO | 1 (4), 0:55 | 2012-02-25 | Scottrade Center in Saint Louis, Missouri, United States | |
| Win | 2–0 | (United States) Cleven Ishe | UD | 4 | 2012-01-06 | Fantasy Springs Resort Casino in Indio, California, United States | |
| Win | 1–0 | (United States) Steven Chadwick | TKO | 1 (4), 1:42 | 2011-11-26 | U.S. Bank Arena in Cincinnati, Ohio, United States | Pearson's professional debut. |
