= Youssef Khoumari =

British boxer (born 1996)

Personal information
- Nickname: Super
- Nationality: British
- Born: Youssef Daniel Fabro Khoumari; 22 June 1996 (age 30) London, England
- Height: 5 ft 8 in (1.73 m)
- Weight: Super-featherweight; Lightweight

Boxing career
- Stance: Orthodox

Boxing record
- Total fights: 22
- Wins: 18
- Win by KO: 8
- Losses: 3
- Draws: 1

Youssef Daniel Fabro Khoumari (born 22 June 1996) is a British professional boxer. He is a former English lightweight champion.

== Personal life ==
Khoumari was born in London to a Moroccan father and a Filipino mother who is a native of Alibeng, Sison, Pangasinan.

== Boxing career ==
=== Amateur career ===
Khoumari represented Neasden IQ Boxing Club as an amateur and won over 40 fights where he had won the Southern Area title and the prestigious Haringey Box Cup.

=== Professional career ===
==== Lightweight division ====
On 9 September 2017, Khoumari made his professional debut in boxing. Khoumari defeated British boxer Andy Harris via a Round 4 (TKO). Following the bout, one month after his professional debut, Khoumari defeated British Boxer Jamie Speight, winning a points decision (PTS) through four rounds.

On 2 December 2017, Khoumari extended his winning streak in less than 3 months after defeating British boxer Joe Beeden, winning a points decision (PTS) through four rounds.

==== Super Lightweight division ====
Khoumari moved up one division, to super lightweight, and defeated British veteran boxer Kristian Laight via a points decision (PTS) through four rounds.

On 8 September 2018, more than five months after his victory against Laight, Khoumari defeated British boxer Michael Mooney via a points decision (PTS) through four rounds.

==== Return to Lightweight ====
Khoumari returned to lightweight and defeated Ukrainian boxer Dmytro Kostenko via a points decision (PTS) through four rounds. Less than a month later, Khoumari defeated British veteran boxer David Birmingham via a Round 6 (TKO).

On 9 March 2019, Khoumari defeated Latvian veteran boxer Aleksandrs Birkenbergs via a points decision (PTS) through six rounds. Three months after, Khoumari defeated British boxer Des Newton, winning a points decision (PTS) through six rounds.

Khoumari extended his winning run to ten matches by defeating British veteran boxer Lee Devine via a Round 3 (TKO).

==== Super Featherweight division ====
Following the bout, Khoumari moved down one division to super featherweight, and received his first draw of his boxing career against Liam Dillon, the match ended in a split draw (SD).

==== Return to Lightweight ====
Khoumari returned to lightweight and defeated Nicaraguan boxer Michael Isaac Carrero via a Round 2 (TKO).

==== Return to Super Featherweight ====
Khoumari returned to super featherweight and defeated British boxer Kane Baker via a Round 5 (TKO).

Six months later, it was reported that Khoumari was scheduled to face former super featherweight world title contender Vicente Martín Rodríguez on September 11, 2021, in Barcelona, Spain. Khoumari defeated Rodríguez via a majority decision (MD) through eight rounds.

Less than two months after his previous fight, it was reported that Khoumari would face American boxer, Jorge David Castañeda on 30 October 2021 in London. He lost the bout, which was for the vacant WBC International Silver super featherweight title, by majority decision.

== Professional boxing record ==
22 fights	18 wins	3 losses
By knockout	8	0
By decision	10	3
Draws	1	

No.	Result	Record	Opponent	Type	Round, time	Date	Location	Notes
22	Loss	18–3–1	Louie O'Doherty	TKO	12	21 Jun 2025	York Hall, London, England	Lost the English lightweight title
21	Win	18–2–1	Tommy Hodgson	TKO	5 (10), 2:41	8 Mar 2025	York Hall, London, England	Won the vacant English lightweight title
20	Win	17–2–1	Kirk Stevens	TKO	8 (10)	9 Mar 2024	York Hall, London, England	
19	Win	16–2–1	Lee Hallett	PTS	6	2 Dec 2023	York Hall, London, England	
18	Loss	15–2–1	Reece Bellotti	UD	10	10 Jun 2023	Wembley Arena, London, England	
17	Win	15–1–1	Cruz Perez	TKO	1 (6), 1:33	18 Mar 2023	York Hall, London, England	
16	Win	14–1–1	Eduardo Valverde	PTS	6	30 Jul 2022	Dunstable Conference Centre, Dunstable, England	
15	Loss	13–1–1	Jorge Castaneda	MD	10	30 Oct 2021	The O2 Arena, London, England	For vacant WBC International Silver super featherweight title
14	Win	13–0–1	Vicente Martín Rodríguez	MD	8	11 Sep 2021	Pavelló de la Vall d'Hebron, Barcelona, Spain	
13	Win	12–0–1	Kane Baker	TKO	5 (10), 2:22	27 Mar 2021	Europa Sports Park, Gibraltar	
12	Win	11–0–1	Michael Isaac Carrero	TKO	2 (6), 2:34	7 Mar 2020	Dunstable Conference Centre, Dunstable, England	
11	Draw	10–0–1	Liam Dillon	SD	10	30 Nov 2019	York Hall, London, England	For vacant English super featherweight title
10	Win	10–0	Lee Devine	TKO	3 (4), 1:59	20 Sep 2019	Indigo at The O2, London, England	
9	Win	9–0	Des Newton	PTS	6	6 Jul 2019	York Hall, London, England	
8	Win	8–0	Aleksandrs Birkenbergs	PTS	6	9 Mar 2019	York Hall, London, England	
7	Win	7–0	David Birmingham	TKO	6 (6), 1:16	1 Dec 2018	York Hall, London, England	
6	Win	6–0	Dmytro Kostenko	PTS	4	2 Nov 2018	Indigo at The O2, London, England	
5	Win	5–0	Michael Mooney	PTS	4	8 Sep 2018	York Hall, London, England	
4	Win	4–0	Kristian Laight	PTS	4	17 Mar 2018	York Hall, London, England	
3	Win	3–0	Joe Beeden	PTS	4	2 Dec 2017	York Hall, London, England	
2	Win	2–0	Jamie Speight	PTS	4	14 Oct 2017	Wembley Arena, London, England	
1	Win	1–0	Andy Harris	TKO	4 (4), 2:38	9 Sep 2017	York Hall, London, England	
