= Lyon Woodstock =

English boxer (born 1993)

Personal information
- Nickname: The Lion
- Born: 13 August 1993 (age 32) Hackney, London, England
- Height: 5 ft 9 in (175 cm)
- Weight: Super-featherweight; Lightweight

Boxing career
- Stance: Orthodox

Boxing record
- Total fights: 21
- Wins: 16
- Win by KO: 7
- Losses: 5

Lyon Woodstock (born 13 August 1993) is an English professional boxer who held the WBO European super-featherweight title from 2017 to 2018 and challenged for the Commonwealth super-featherweight title in 2019.

== Professional career ==
Woodstock made his professional debut on 12 June 2015, scoring a first-round knockout (KO) victory over Reece Smith at the York Hall in London.

After compiling a record of 8–0 (4 KOs) he faced Paul Holt for the vacant Midlands Area super-featherweight title on 22 April 2017 at the Leicester Arena. Woodstock got off to a troubled start in the first round before taking control in the second. The referee called a halt to the contest in the third round after Woodstock landed clean uppercuts while Holt was pinned against the ropes, awarding Woodstock the Midlands Area title via technical knockout (TKO).

In his next fight he challenged for the vacant WBO European super-featherweight title, facing Craig Poxton on 21 October 2017 at the First Direct Arena in Leeds. Woodstock captured the WBO regional title via unanimous decision (UD) with the judges' scorecards reading 98–93, 97–93 and 97–95. Following a points decision (PTS) win against Edwin Tellez in a non-title fight in May 2018, Woodstock made the first defence of his title against Archie Sharp on 6 October at the Morningside Arena (formerly Leicester Arena). After being knocked down in the opening round by a left hook, Woodstock went on to lose his title via UD over ten rounds. All three judges scored the bout 96–93.

After bouncing back from defeat with a PTS win against Sergio Gonzalez in March 2019, he faced Zelfa Barrett for the vacant Commonwealth super-featherweight title on 15 June at the First Direct Arena. After struggling to keep up with Barrett's speed and movement, Woodstock lost by UD over twelve rounds. One judge scored the bout 118–110 while the other two scored it 117–111, handing Woodstock the second defeat of his career.

Woodstock challenged Commonwealth featherweight champion Zak Miller at Planet Ice in Altrincham on 23 August 2025, losing via unanimous decision.

== Professional boxing record ==
21 fights	16 wins	5 losses
By knockout	7	0
By decision	9	5

No.	Result	Record	Opponent	Type	Round, time	Date	Location	Notes
21	Loss	16–5	Zak Miller	UD	12	23 Aug 2025	Planet Ice, Altrincham, England	For the Commonwealth featherweight title
20	Loss	16–4	Kurt Walker	MD	10	1 Mar 2025	SSE Arena, Belfast, Northern Ireland	
19	Win	16–3	Rakesh Lohchab	KO	3 (10)	26 Oct 2024	Morningside Arena, Leicester, England	
18	Win	15–3	Tampela Maharusi	PTS	6	14 Jun 2024	Morningside Arena, Leicester, England	
17	Win	14–3	Tatenda Mangombe	PTS	6	2 Mar 2024	Morningside Arena, Leicester, England	
16	Win	13–3	Louis Norman	KO	3 (6), 1:20	12 May 2023	Maher Center, Leicester, England	
15	Loss	12–3	Anthony Cacace	UD	12	28 Aug 2021	Arena Birmingham, Birmingham, England	For British super-featherweight title
14	Loss	12–2	Zelfa Barrett	UD	12	15 Jun 2019	First Direct Arena, Leeds, England	For vacant Commonwealth super-featherweight title
13	Win	12–1	Sergio Gonzalez	PTS	8	23 Mar 2019	Morningside Arena, Leicester, England	
12	Loss	11–1	Archie Sharp	UD	10	6 Oct 2018	Morningside Arena, Leicester, England	Lost WBO European super-featherweight title
11	Win	11–0	Edwin Tellez	PTS	8	19 May 2018	Elland Road, Leeds, England	
10	Win	10–0	Craig Poxton	UD	10	21 Oct 2017	First Direct Arena, Leeds, England	Won vacant WBO European super-featherweight title
9	Win	9–0	Paul Holt	TKO	3 (10), 2:45	22 Apr 2017	Leicester Arena, Leicester, England	Won vacant Midlands Area super-featherweight title
8	Win	8–0	Antonio Horvatic	KO	3 (6), 2:30	22 Oct 2016	Bolton Whites Hotel, Bolton, England	
7	Win	7–0	Reynaldo Mora	PTS	6	10 Jun 2016	York Hall, London, England	
6	Win	6–0	Ibrar Riyaz	PTS	4	12 Mar 2016	Echo Arena, Liverpool, England	
5	Win	5–0	Ibrar Riyaz	PTS	4	13 Dec 2015	Hermitage Leisure Centre, Whitwick, England	
4	Win	4–0	Ignac Kassai	TKO	1 (4), 2:00	3 Oct 2015	Civic Hall, Wolverhampton, England	
3	Win	3–0	Michael Mooney	PTS	4	11 Sep 2015	Rockingham Forest Hotel, Corby, England	
2	Win	2–0	Elemir Rafael	TKO	2 (4), 1:26	25 Jul 2015	Ellesmere Port Sports Village, Ellesmere Port, England	
1	Win	1–0	Reece Smith	KO	1 (4), 0:38	12 Jun 2015	York Hall, London, England	

Sporting positions
Regional boxing titles
Vacant Title last held by Paul Holt	Midlands Area super-featherweight champion 22 April 2017 – September 2017	Vacant Title next held by James Beech Jr.
Vacant Title last held by Zoltán Kovács	WBO European super-featherweight champion 21 October 2017 – 6 October 2018	Succeeded by Archie Sharp
