= Billel Dib =

Australian boxer (born 1989)

Personal information
- Nickname: Babyface
- Nationality: Australian
- Born: 26 May 1989 (age 37) Sydney, New South Wales, Australia
- Height: 5 ft 9 in (175 cm)
- Weight: Super-featherweight

Boxing career
- Reach: 69 in (175 cm)
- Stance: Orthodox

Boxing record
- Total fights: 30
- Wins: 26
- Win by KO: 13
- Losses: 4
- Draws: 0

Billel Dib (born 26 May 1989) is an Australian professional boxer who has held the WBA Oceania super-featherweight title since 2018, and now also holds the International Boxing Federation Australasian super featherweight title. Billel Dib has held many titles such as the Australian title 2 times and the World Boxing Organization Oriental titles.

== Early life and education ==
Dib was born in Sydney, New South Wales, on 26 May 1989, into a Lebanese-Australian family. His parents emigrated to Australia from Lebanon. He was raised on the Gold Coast, Queensland, and graduated from Benowa State High School in 2006. He currently resides on the Gold Coast and travels to Sydney regularly for training camp, and to continue his commitments as a student of Accounting at the University of Western Sydney. His brother, Ahmed 'Dynamite' Dib is also a professional boxer.

== Professional career ==
=== Australia ===
Dib's professional career commenced in January 2011 when he debuted against Jayson Mac Gura on the Gold Coast, Australia. Dib won and went on to win the next seven bouts before suffering his first loss in October 2012, when Dib lost his claim to the Australian super-featherweight title against Dylan Sendeckyj by way of a split decision. In June 2013, Dib avenged the loss against Sendeckyj to capture the Australian title, winning by way of knockout. In May 2014, Dib won the WBO Oriental interim super-featherweight title against Brett Elliot in Sydney, Australia. In April 2015, Dib won the same title for a second time, against Bebong Manalo.

=== United States ===
Dib signed with Probox Management in February 2016, and went on to win his first international bout in April 2016 against Jose Salinas by way of majority decision. Chief executive officer and co-founder of Probox Management, Garry Jonas, has expressed that Dib "has all the characteristics that [Pro Box Management] look for. He is a hard worker, well spoken, good looking action fighting young man, who is very marketable. We definitely think he can be a significant world champion sometime soon."

== Professional boxing record ==
30 fights, 26 wins, 4 loss
| No. | Res. | Record | Opponent | Type | Date | Location |
|---|---|---|---|---|---|---|
| 30 | Loss | 26–4 | Francisco Fonseca | TKO | 2022-12-09 | Whitlam Leisure Centre, Liverpool |
| 29 | Win | 26–3 | Satnam Singh | TKO | 2022-07-16 | Orion Function Centre, Campsie |
| 28 | Win | 25–3 | Jack Asis | UD | 2021-04-09 | Club Punchbowl, Punchbowl |
| 27 | Win | 24–3 | Carlo Magali | UD | 2019-09-14 | Seagulls Rugby League Club, Tweed Heads |
| 26 | Win | 23–3 | Rey Juntilla | TKO | 2019-03-30 | Seagulls Rugby League Club, Tweed Heads |
| 25 | Win | 22–3 | Bruno Tarimo | UD | 2018-08-11 | Seagulls Rugby League Club, Tweed Heads |
| 24 | Loss | 21–3 | Bruno Tarimo | MD | 2018-03-24 | Seagulls Rugby League Club, Tweed Heads |
| 23 | Loss | 21–2 | Yuandale Evans | UD | 2017-04-21 | Buffalo Run Casino, Miami |
| 22 | Win | 21–1 | Carlos Padilla | UD | 2016-12-10 | Buffalo Run Casino, Miami |
| 21 | Win | 20–1 | Thongchai Kunram | KO | 2016-06-03 | Emporium Function Centre, Bankstown, NSW, Australia |
| 20 | Win | 19–1 | Jose Salinas | MD | 2016-04-20 | Hilton Westchester, Westchester, New York City |
| 19 | Win | 18–1 | Natthawat Thawithong | KO | 2015-11-27 | Entertainment Centre, Hurstville, NSW, Australia |
| 18 | Win | 17–1 | Bebong Manalo | TKO | 2015-04-17 | Entertainment Centre, Hurstville, NSW, Australia |
| 17 | Win | 16–1 | Erick Diaz Siregar | KO | 2015-01-31 | All phones Arena, Olympic Park, Sydney, NSW, Australia |
| 16 | Win | 15–1 | Anshori Anhar Pitulay | TKO | 2014-10-31 | The Melbourne Pavilion, Flemington, Victoria, Australia |
| 15 | Win | 14–1 | Brent Elliot | UD | 2014-05-31 | Emporium Function Centre, Bankstown, NSW, Australia |
| 14 | Win | 13–1 | Michael Correa | UD | 2014-02-15 | LMA Grand Function Hall, Lakemba, Sydney, NSW, Australia |
| 13 | Win | 12–1 | Igor Tsujev | UD | 2014-01-29 | Brisbane Entertainment Centre, Boondall, Queensland, Australia |
| 12 | Win | 11–1 | Dylan Sendeckyj | TKO | 2013-06-13 | Orion Function Centre, Campsie, NSW, Australia |
| 11 | Win | 10–1 | Roberto Oyan | MD | 2013-01-19 | LMA Grand Function Hall, Lakemba, Sydney, NSW, Australia |
| 10 | Loss | 9–1 | Dylan Sendeckyj | SD | 2012-10-26 | Reggio Calabria Club, Parkville, Victoria, Australia |
| 9 | Win | 9–0 | Hwi Jong Kim | UD | 2012-07-13 | Orion Function Centre, Campsie, New South Wales, Australia |
| 8 | Win | 8–0 | Justin Medoro | UD | 2012-05-12 | LMA Grand Function Hall, Lakemba, Sydney, NSW, Australia |
| 7 | Win | 7–0 | Jayson Mac Gura | KO | 2012-02-24 | Orion Function Centre, Campsie, New South Wales, Australia |
| 6 | Win | 6–0 | Manopnoi Singmanasak | UD | 2011-12-02 | Sunshine Roller Skating Centre, Sunshine, Victoria, Australia |
| 5 | Win | 5–0 | Cheyne Rees | UD | 2011-11-19 | Homebush Sports Centre, Sydney, New South Wales, Australia |
| 4 | Win | 4–0 | Derek Webber | TKO | 2011-10-19 | Entertainment Centre, Newcastle, NSW, Australia |
| 3 | Win | 3–0 | Luke Norton | PTS | 2011-07-15 | Orion Function Centre, Campsie, New South Wales, Australia |
| 2 | Win | 2–0 | Mark Eaton | TKO | 2011-04-13 | Brisbane Entertainment Centre, Boondall, Queensland Australia |
| 1 | Win | 1–0 | Jayson Mac Gura | TKO | 2011-01-29 | Gold Coast Convention Centre, Broadbeach, Queensland, Australia |

== Boxing titles ==
1. x2 Australian Super Featherweight Title;
2. World Boxing Organisation (WBO) Oriental Champion;
3. World Boxing Association (WBA) Oceania Champion
4. International Boxing Federation (IBF) Australasian Champion

== Personal life ==
Dib is a self-identified devout Muslim, and was raised in a Muslim-Australian household. He is involved in community work with Islamic Care, supporting social workers in disability centres in Lebanon for Lebanese, Palestinian and Syrian disabled refugees.
