= Ryan Garner =

English boxer (born 1998)

Personal information
- Nickname: The Piranha
- Born: 5 January 1998 (age 28) Southampton, Hampshire, England
- Height: 5 ft 6 in (168 cm)
- Weight: Super-featherweight

Boxing career
- Stance: Orthodox

Boxing record
- Total fights: 20
- Wins: 20
- Win by KO: 10

Ryan Garner (born 5 January 1998) is an English professional boxer. He has held the interim WBC super-featherweight title since June 2026. Garner is also a former British, Commonwealth and European super-featherweight champion.

== Career ==
Unbeaten in his first 13 professional fights, Garner faced Juan Jesus Antunez for the vacant WBC super-featherweight International title at York Hall in London on 18 August 2023. He won by stoppage in the third round.

He successfully defended his title with unanimous decision wins over Liam Dillon at York Hall on 11 May 2024, and Archie Sharp at The O2 Arena in London on 27 July 2024.

In his next bout on 1 March 2025, Garner defeated the previously unbeaten Spanish boxer Salvador Jimenez via unanimous decision at Bournemouth International Centre to claim the vacant European super-featherweight title with all three ringside judges scoring the fight 120–108.

Garner added the British and Commonwealth super-featherweight titles to his collection by dethroning defending champion Reece Bellotti at Bournemouth International Centre on 26 July 2025, winning by 12th round stoppage.

On 20 October 2025, he vacated his European title. He also reliquished his British title in January 2026.

Garner stopped Cristian Bielma in the third of a scheduled eight-round non-title contest at 3Arena in Dublin, Ireland, on 14 March 2026.

He faced Michael Magnesi for the vacant interim WBC super-featherweight title at St Mary's Stadium in Southampton on 20 June 2026. Garner dominated the fight and won via unanimous decision.

Garner is scheduled to make the first defense of his title against former WBA super-featherweight champion Jazza Dickens at Bournemouth International Centre on 9 January 2027.

== Drug driving conviction ==
In August 2017, Garner was convicted of driving while under the influence of cocaine. Southampton Magistrates' Court heard he crashed his brothers' car into a parked vehicle after taking the drug on 21 May that year. Garner was sentenced to an 80-hour unpaid work order and banned from driving for two years. He was also suspended by the British Boxing Board of Control.

== Professional boxing record ==
20 fights	20 wins	0 losses
By knockout	10	0
By decision	10	0

No.	Result	Record	Opponent	Type	Round, time	Date	Location	Notes
20	Win	20–0	Michael Magnesi	UD	12	20 Jun 2026	St Mary's Stadium, Southampton, England	Won vacant interim WBC super-featherweight title
19	Win	19–0	Cristian Bielma	TKO	3 (8), 1:07	14 Mar 2026	3Arena, Dublin, Ireland	
18	Win	18–0	Reece Bellotti	TKO	12 (12), 0:45	26 Jul 2025	Bournemouth International Centre, Bournemouth, England	Retained WBC International and European super-featherweight titles; Won Commonwealth and British super featherweight titles
17	Win	17–0	Salvador Jimenez	UD	12	1 Mar 2025	Bournemouth International Centre, Bournemouth, England	Retained WBC International super-featherweight title; Won vacant European super-featherweight title
16	Win	16–0	Archie Sharp	UD	10	27 Jul 2024	The O2 Arena, London, England	Retained WBC International super-featherweight title
15	Win	15–0	Liam Dillon	UD	10	11 May 2024	York Hall, Bethnal Green, London, England	Retained WBC International super-featherweight title
14	Win	14–0	Juan Jesus Antunez	TKO	3 (10), 2:18	18 Aug 2023	York Hall, Bethnal Green, London, England	Won vacant WBC International super-featherweight title
13	Win	13–0	Eduardo Valverde	KO	2 (6), 0:49	12 May 2023	York Hall, Bethnal Green, London, England	
12	Win	12–0	Christian Lopez Flores	PTS	8	16 July 2022	Copper Box Arena, London, England	
11	Win	11–0	Pedro Manuel Gomes	PTS	8	6 Nov 2021	Utilita Arena, Birmingham, England	
10	Win	10–0	Jordan Ellison	PTS	6	30 Apr 2021	York Hall, Bethnal Green, London, England	
9	Win	9–0	Jamie Quinn	PTS	6	22 Feb 2020	York Hall, Bethnal Green, London, England	
8	Win	8–0	Jose Aguilar	TKO	3 (6), 1:44	15 Dec 2018	Brentwood Centre, Essex, England	
7	Win	7–0	Lester Cantillano	PTS	4	24 Feb 2018	York Hall, Bethnal Green, London, England	
6	Win	6–0	Tamas Laska	KO	1 (4), 2:02	8 July 2017	Copper Box Arena, London, England	
5	Win	5–0	Rafael Castillo	PTS	4	13 May 2017	First Direct Arena, Leeds, Yorkshire, England	
4	Win	4–0	Johnson Tellez	TKO	3 (4), 2:30	11 Mar 2017	Novotel, Southampton, Hampshire, England	
3	Win	3–0	Antonio Horvatic	TKO	2 (4), 1:31	3 Dec 2016	Guildhall, Southampton, Hampshire, England	
2	Win	2–0	Aleksandrs Birkenbergs	TKO	3 (4), 0:23	8 Oct 2016	Harrow Leisure Centre, Harrow, London, England	
1	Win	1–0	Ricky Leach	TKO	4 (4), 1:54	10 Jun 2016	York Hall, Bethnal Green, London, England	
