= Jordan Gill =

English boxer (born 1994)

Personal information
- Nickname: The Thrill
- Born: 1 July 1994 (age 32) Huntingdon, Cambridgeshire, England
- Height: 5 ft 5 in (165 cm)
- Weight: Featherweight; Super-featherweight; Lightweight
- Website: https://jordangillboxing.co.uk/

Boxing career
- Stance: Southpaw

Boxing record
- Total fights: 32
- Wins: 28
- Win by KO: 9
- Losses: 3
- Draws: 1

Jordan Gill (born 1 July 1994) is an English former professional boxer. He held the Commonwealth featherweight title in 2018 and the European featherweight title in 2022.

== Professional career ==
Gill made his professional debut on 7 July 2012, scoring a four-round points decision victory against Kristian Laight at the Sheffield Arena.

After compiling a record of 21–0 (5 KOs), he challenged Commonwealth featherweight champion, Ryan Doyle, on 27 October 2018 at the Copper Box Arena in London. Gill dropped the champion to the canvas in the seventh round with body shots. Doyle was able to beat the referee's count of 10, only to be met with a barrage of punches, prompting referee Victor Laughlin to call a halt to the contest, awarding Gill a seventh-round technical knockout victory to become the new Commonwealth champion.

After Gill vacated his Commonwealth title in early 2019, he faced Emmanuel Dominguez for the vacant WBA International featherweight title on 2 March 2019 at the East of England Arena in Peterborough. In an early night for Gill, he dropped his opponent twice in the third round in quick succession before forcing the referee to halt the contest after trapping Dominguez against the ropes while unloading a flurry of punches, awarding Gill the win via third-round technical knockout.

The first defense of his title came two months later against Mario Enrique Tinoco on 10 May 2019 at the Motorpoint Arena in Nottingham. Gill was dropped on three occasions; once in the third round, again in the fifth and once more in the seventh, all by punches to the body. Before the start of round eight, Dave Coldwell, Gill's head trainer, pulled the champion out of the contest to save him from further punishment. Tinoco was declared the winner via eighth round corner retirement. After the fight, Gill claimed his poor performance was due to illness, saying, "I'm not going to make excuses but I'm going to, I've been on the toilet all afternoon. I think I've got food poisoning, I was not going to pull out on the day, I didn't want to quit in the fight."

Gill was booked to face Yesner Talavera on 19 September 2019, at the Tuscany Hall in Florence, Italy. He won his first fight outside of the United Kingdom by unanimous decision, with all three judges scoring the fight 60–54 in his favour. Gill was next scheduled to face Reece Bellotti on 1 August 2020. He won the fight by unanimous decision, with two judges scoring the fight 97–93 for him, while the third judge scored it 96–95 for Gill.

After successfully bouncing back from his first professional loss, Gill faced Cesar Juarez on 20 February 2021, for the vacant WBA International featherweight title. He won the fight by unanimous decision, with scores of 98–92, 98–93 and 96–94. Gill was expected to face Karim Guerfi for the European featherweight title on 11 December 2021. Guerfi later withdrew from the bout due to illness, and was replaced by Alan Castillo, who faced Gill in a non-title bout. The fight was ruled a draw by technical decision, after three rounds. The fight was stopped on the advice of the ringside physician, after Gill suffered a large cut on the hairline, due to an accidental clash of heads.

Gill eventually got his opportunity at the European featherweight title when he took on Guerfi at The O2 Arena in London on 27 February 2022, winning by knockout in the ninth round.

He lost the title in his first defense, going down to a fourth round technical knockout defeat to Kiko Martinez at Wembley Arena in London on 29 October 2022.

Next he faced Michael Conlan for the vacant WBA International super-featherweight title at the SSE Arena, Belfast, Northern Ireland, on 2 December 2023, winning via stoppage in the seventh round.

In December 2023, Gill opened his own gym, Boxcross UK, in Wisbech along with his business partners Damien Pearl and Gareth Watts.

On 13 April 2024 at Manchester Arena, Gill fought Zelfa Barrett. He lost the fight by technical knockout in the 10th round.

== Professional boxing record ==
32 fights	28 wins	3 losses
By knockout	9	3
By decision	19	0
Draws	1	

No.	Result	Record	Opponent	Type	Round, time	Date	Location	Notes
32	Loss	28–3–1	Zelfa Barrett	TKO	10 (12), 2:44	13 Apr 2024	Manchester Arena, Manchester	
31	Win	28–2–1	Michael Conlan	TKO	7 (12), 1:09	2 Dec 2023	SSE Arena, Belfast, Northern Ireland	Won vacant WBA International super-featherweight title
30	Loss	27–2–1	Kiko Martinez	TKO	4 (12) 2:44	29 Oct 2022	Wembley Arena, London, England	Lost European featherweight title
29	Win	27–1–1	Karim Guerfi	KO	9 (12), 2:59	27 Feb 2022	The O2 Arena, London, England	Won European featherweight title
28	Draw	26–1–1	Alan Castillo	TD	3 (8), 3:00	11 Dec 2021	Echo Arena, Liverpool, England	
27	Win	26–1	Cesar Juarez	UD	10	20 Feb 2021	The SSE Arena, London, England	Won vacant WBA International featherweight title
26	Win	25–1	Reece Bellotti	UD	10	1 Aug 2020	Matchroom Fight Camp, Brentwood, England	
25	Win	24–1	Yesner Talavera	UD	6	19 Sep 2019	Tuscany Hall, Florence, Italy	
24	Loss	23–1	Mario Enrique Tinoco	RTD	8 (10), 3:00	10 May 2019	Motorpoint Arena, Nottingham, England	Lost WBA International featherweight title
23	Win	23–0	Emmanuel Dominguez	TKO	3 (12), 1:55	2 Mar 2019	East of England Arena, Peterborough, England	Won vacant WBA International featherweight title
22	Win	22–0	Ryan Doyle	TKO	7 (12), 1:32	27 Oct 2018	Copper Box Arena, London, England	Won Commonwealth featherweight title
21	Win	21–0	David Berna	TKO	1 (8), 1:52	4 Aug 2018	Ice Arena Wales, Cardiff, Wales	
20	Win	20–0	Carl McDonald	PTS	6	5 May 2018	The O2 Arena, London, England	
19	Win	19–0	Jason Cunningham	UD	10	25 Feb 2018	Victoria Warehouse Hotel, Manchester, England	
18	Win	18–0	Rafael Castillo	PTS	6	13 Oct 2017	Rollerworld, Derby, England	
17	Win	17–0	Jordan Ellison	TKO	2 (6), 2:35	2 Sep 2017	Doncaster Dome, Doncaster, England	
16	Win	16–0	Chris Adaway	PTS	6	26 Mar 2016	Sheffield Arena, Sheffield, England	
15	Win	15–0	Harvey Hemsley	TKO	2 (6), 2:41	5 Dec 2015	Westcroft Leisure Centre, Carshalton, England	
14	Win	14–0	Giorgi Gachechiladze	PTS	6	25 Jul 2015	Derby Arena, Derby, England	
13	Win	13–0	Barrington Brown	PTS	6	28 Mar 2015	Sheffield Arena, Sheffield, England	
12	Win	12–0	Giorgi Kulumbegashvili	PTS	4	7 Dec 2014	Hermitage Leisure Centre, Whitwick, England	
11	Win	11–0	Simas Volosinas	PTS	6	20 Sep 2014	Ponds Forge Arena, Sheffield, England	
10	Win	10–0	Michael Mooney	PTS	4	10 May 2014	Ponds Forge Arena, Sheffield, England	
9	Win	9–0	Michael Stupart	TKO	2 (8), 0:47	1 Feb 2014	Bushfield Leisure Centre, Peterborough, England	
8	Win	8–0	Aaron Flinn	KO	1 (4), 0:46	26 Oct 2013	Sheffield Arena, Sheffield, England	
7	Win	7–0	Dan Carr	PTS	4	14 Sep 2013	Magna Centre, Rotherham, England	
6	Win	6–0	Kristian Laight	PTS	4	22 Jun 2013	East of England Arena, Peterborough, England	
5	Win	5–0	Pavels Senkovs	PTS	4	11 May 2013	East of England Arena, Peterborough, England	
4	Win	4–0	Sid Razak	PTS	6	2 Feb 2013	East of England Arena, Peterborough, England	
3	Win	3–0	Pavels Senkovs	PTS	4	8 Dec 2012	KC Sports Arena, Hull, England	
2	Win	2–0	Dan Naylor	PTS	4	13 Oct 2012	Glow, Bluewater, Greenhithe, England	
1	Win	1–0	Kristian Laight	PTS	4	7 Jul 2012	Motorpoint Arena, Sheffield, England	
