= Patrick Kinigamazi =

Rwandan boxer (born 1983)

Personal information
- Nickname: King Kini
- Nationality: Rwandan
- Born: 2 March 1983 (age 43) Gisenyi, Rwanda
- Weight: Super-featherweight; Lightweight

Boxing career

Boxing record
- Total fights: 34
- Wins: 32
- Win by KO: 4
- Losses: 3

Patrick Kinigamazi (born 2 March 1983) is a Rwandan former professional boxer who competed from 2006 to 2020. He held the African lightweight title in 2016 and the WBF super featherweight title from 2017 to 2020.

== Early life ==
Kinigamazi was born on 2 March 1983 in Gisenyi, Rwanda, and moved to Switzerland in at the age of fifteen to join family in the aftermath of the Rwandan genocide. After beginning in combat sports when he was seventeen, he followed his brother into a boxing ring and joined Club pugilistique de Carouge (CP Carouge).

During his early years as a pro boxer he also competed in kickboxing, winning two World and four European titles. On 2 May 2010, he won the WKN full-contact world featherweight title from Gary Hamilton, ending his seven-year reign as champion. Kinigamazi later called it his toughest fight.

Kinigamazi also played basketball with Bernex Geneve Basket.

== Professional career ==
Kinigamazi made his professional boxing debut on 29 June 2006, defeating Rocco Cipriano by fifth-round technical knockout in Carouge. He won his first title in his seventh fight, a split decision victory over Martino Ciano for the vacant Swiss lightweight title. After a streak of 16 wins to start his pro career he lost his first bout in 2011 to future European super featherweight champion Guillaume Frenois. A year later he suffered his second defeat at the hands of another Frenchman, Sebastien Cornu.

On 18 November 2016, more than nine years after his last championship fight, he beat Spanish-based Congolese fighter Clark Telamanou for the vacant African lightweight title via majority decision with the scorecards reading 96–94, 96–94 and 95–95. Two fights later, on 9 June 2017, a 34-year-old Kinigamazi defeated Juan José Farias unanimously (117–106, 116–107, 116–107) to win vacant WBF super featherweight title. He had four successful defenses against young contenders before he faced veteran South African Bongani Mahlangu in Geneva in his fifth defense, defeating the 2004 Olympian by majority decision on 12 December 2019. He was also named 2017 Fighter of the Year at the WBF Awards.

Kinigamazi was scheduled to fight Michael Magnesi on 6 November 2020 for the vacant IBO super featherweight title, but it had to be postponed after he tested positive for COVID-19. Three weeks later, Kinigamazi was stopped for the first time in his career. Magnesi knocked him down in the third round and again in the fifth to seal the victory. Kinigamazi confirmed that this was his last fight.

Kinigamazi had previously served as a promoter during his career, and continued in the role after his retirement. On 24 June 2021, he organized an event at the Salle Palladium in Geneva which featured the pro debut of Bryan Fanga, a Swiss prospect of Cameroonian origin who was seen by many as Kinigamazi's successor. It featured both pro and amateur bouts and was the first boxing event held in Switzerland in over a year and a half due to the COVID-19 pandemic.

== Professional boxing record ==
35 fights	32 wins	3 losses
By knockout	4	1
By decision	27	2
By disqualification	1	0

No.	Result	Record	Opponent	Type	Round, time	Date	Location	Notes
35	Loss	32–3	(Italy) Michael Magnesi	TKO	5 (12)	27 Nov 2020	Palasport, Fondi, Italy	For vacant IBO super featherweight title
34	Win	32–2	(South Africa) Bongani Mahlangu	MD	12	12 Dec 2019	Cirque de Noel, Geneva, Switzerland	Retained WBF super featherweight title
33	Win	31–2	(Slovakia) Martin Parlagi	UD	10	28 Jun 2019	Théâtre du Léman, Geneva, Switzerland	Retained WBF super featherweight title
32	Win	30–2	(United Kingdom) Jordan McCorry	UD	12	13 Dec 2018	Cirque de Noel, Geneva, Switzerland	Retained WBF super featherweight title
31	Win	29–2	(Nicaragua) Ramiro Blanco	UD	12	1 Jun 2018	Salle bout du Monde, Geneva, Switzerland	Retained WBF super featherweight title
30	Win	28–2	(Hungary) Robert Laki	TKO	5 (12)	24 Nov 2017	Salle bout du Monde, Geneva, Switzerland	Retained WBF super featherweight title
29	Win	27–2	(Argentina) Juan José Farias	UD	12	9 Jun 2017	Thônex, Switzerland	Won vacant WBF super featherweight title
28	Win	26–2	(France) Ruben Gouveia	PTS	8	18 Feb 2017	Maison des sports, Annemasse, France	
27	Win	25–2	(Republic of the Congo) Clark Telamanou	MD	10	18 Nov 2016	Salle des Fêtes, Carouge, Switzerland	Won vacant African lightweight title
26	Win	24–2	(Honduras) Miguel González	UD	8	22 Apr 2016	Citroën Acacias, Geneva, Switzerland	
25	Win	23–2	(France) Sylvain Chapelle	UD	8	3 Jul 2015	Hotel Novotel, Monte Carlo, Monaco	
24	Win	22–2	(Spain) King Daluz	UD	8	21 Nov 2014	Salle des Fêtes, Carouge, Switzerland	
23	Win	21–2	(Spain) Ryan Peleguer	PTS	6	1 Nov 2014	Pabellón Central, Santa Cruz de Tenerife, Spain	
22	Win	20–2	(Spain) Francisco Urena	UD	6	25 May 2013	Salle Louis-Bertrand, Geneva, Switzerland	
21	Win	19–2	(Hungary) Zsolt Nagy	UD	8	15 Feb 2013	Salle des Fêtes, Carouge, Switzerland	
20	Loss	18–2	(France) Sebastien Cornu	UD	6	1 Dec 2012	Salle de Gymnastique du Bourg, Martigny, Switzerland	
19	Win	18–1	(Hungary) Janos Vass	TKO	2 (6), 1:22	6 Oct 2012	Villars-sur-Ollon, Switzerland	
18	Win	17–1	(Belarus) Andrei Staliarchuk	UD	8	10 Feb 2012	Salle des Fêtes, Carouge, Switzerland	
17	Loss	16–1	(France) Guillaume Frenois	UD	12	26 Nov 2011	Arena de Genève, Geneva, Switzerland	
16	Win	16–0	(Morocco) Youness Laribi	DQ	6 (8), 2:20	7 May 2011	Salle Louis-Bertrand, Geneva, Switzerland	
15	Win	15–0	(Hungary) Zsolt Nagy	UD	6	6 Nov 2010	Salle bout du Monde, Geneva, Switzerland	
14	Win	14–0	(Mexico) Argel Salinas	UD	10	3 Jun 2010	Salle Communale de Carouge, Carouge, Switzerland	
13	Win	13–0	(Panama) Danys Díaz	UD	10	27 Nov 2009	Salle des Fêtes, Carouge, Switzerland	
12	Win	12–0	(United States) Mario Hayes	UD	8	13 Nov 2009	Casino de Deauville, Deauville, France	
11	Win	11–0	(Morocco) Samir Boukrara	UD	6	14 Feb 2009	Salle des Fêtes, Carouge, Switzerland	
10	Win	10–0	(Slovakia) Roman Rafael	TKO	2 (8), 1:40	1 Jun 2008	Ecole de Charmettes, Geneva, Switzerland	
9	Win	9–0	(Spain) Ruddy Encarnación	UD	6	8 Feb 2008	Salle des Fêtes, Carouge, Switzerland	
8	Win	8–0	(Algeria) Omar Krim	UD	6	15 Nov 2007	Salle Palladium, Geneva, Switzerland	
7	Win	7–0	(Switzerland) Martino Ciano	SD	10	30 Sep 2007	Salle bout du Monde, Geneva, Switzerland	Won vacant Swiss lightweight title
6	Win	6–0	(France) Mickaël Gomard	UD	6	15 Mar 2007	Salle Palladium, Geneva, Switzerland	
5	Win	5–0	(France) Nicolas Fargette	UD	6	2 Mar 2007	Salle des Fêtes de Perdtemps, Nyon, Switzerland	
4	Win	4–0	(France) Frederic Gosset	UD	6	16 Feb 2007	Salle des Fêtes, Carouge, Switzerland	
3	Win	3–0	(France) Nicolas Fargette	UD	6	26 Oct 2006	Salle Palladium, Geneva, Switzerland	
2	Win	2–0	(France) Franck Aiello	UD	6	16 Sep 2006	Casino Lucien Barrière, Montreux, Switzerland	
1	Win	1–0	(Switzerland) Rocco Cipriano	TKO	5 (6), 2:25	29 Jun 2006	Salle des Fêtes, Carouge, Switzerland	
