= Archie Sharp =

English boxer (born 1995)

Personal information
- Nickname: Sharpshooter
- Nationality: English
- Born: 14 April 1995 (age 31) Sidcup, Kent, England
- Height: 5 ft 9 in (175 cm)
- Weight: Super-featherweight; Lightweight

Boxing career
- Stance: Orthodox

Boxing record
- Total fights: 28
- Wins: 26
- Win by KO: 9
- Losses: 2

Archie Sharp (born 14 April 1995) is an English professional boxer. He is a former WBO European junior-lightweight title holder.

== Professional career ==
Sharp made his professional debut on 17 July 2015, scoring a first-round technical knockout (TKO) victory over Laszlo Fekete at the York Hall in London.

After compiling a record of 13–0 (7 KOs) he faced Lyon Woodstock on 6 October 2018 at the Morningside Arena in Leicester, with Woodstock's WBO European junior-lightweight title on the line. Sharp knocked Woodstock to the canvas in the opening round en route to a unanimous decision (UD) victory over ten rounds. All three judges scored the bout 96–93, awarding Sharp the WBO European title. Following a second-round TKO win against Sergio Gonzalez in April 2019, Sharp successfully defended his title on three occasions that year; a UD over Jordan McCorry in July; a fourth-round TKO against Declan Geragthy in September; and a UD over Artjom Ramlavs in December.

Sharp's sole fight of 2020 was against his countryman Jeff Ofori on 15 August 2020. He won the closely contested bout by a narrow unanimous decision, with referee and judge Marcus McDonnell scoring the fight 96-95 for Sharp.

Sharp was booked to fight Diego Andrade for the vacant WBO Global junior-lightweight title on 10 July 2021. He won the fight by unanimous decision, with two judges scoring the bout 97-93 in his favor, while the third judge scored it 99-93 for Sharp. Sharp made his first WBO Global title defense against Alexis Boureima Kabore on 29 October 2021. He won the fight by a dominant unanimous decision, with all three judges scoring the fight 100-90 for him.

Sharp challenged WBC super-featherweight International champion Ryan Garner at The O2 Arena in London on 27 July 2024, losing by unanimous decision to suffer the first defeat of his professional career.

On 23 May 2025, he lost to Maxi Hughes by unanimous decision at Keepmoat Stadium in Doncaster in a fight for the vacant WBC Silver lightweight title.

== Professional boxing record ==
28 fights	26 wins	2 losses
By knockout	9	0
By decision	17	2

No.	Result	Record	Opponent	Type	Round, time	Date	Location	Notes
28	Win	26-2	Stefan Vincent	PTS	6	30 Nov 2025	York Hall, Bethnal Green	
27	Loss	25-2	Maxi Hughes	UD	10	23 May 2025	Keepmoat Stadium, Doncaster, England	For vacant WBC Silver lightweight title
26	Loss	25-1	Ryan Garner	UD	12	27 Jul 2024	02 Arena, London	For the WBC super-featherweight International title
25	Win	25-0	Reuquen Cona Facundo Arce	PTS	8	11 May 2024	York Hall, Bethnal Green	
24	Win	24-0	Victor Julio	PTS	8	8 Dec 2023	York Hall, Bethnal Green	
23	Win	23-0	Mauro Alex Hasan Perouene	UD	10	14 Apr 2023	York Hall, Bethnal Green	
22	Win	22-0	Alex Rat	UD	10	18 Jun 2022	LUFC Banqueting Suite, Elland Road, Leeds	
21	Win	21-0	Alexis Boureima Kabore	UD	10	29 Oct 2021	York Hall, London, England	Retained WBO Global junior-lightweight title
20	Win	20-0	Diego Andrade	UD	10	10 Jul 2021	Royal Albert Hall, London, England	Won vacant WBO Global junior-lightweight title
19	Win	19-0	Jeff Ofori	PTS	10	15 Aug 2020	York Hall, London, England	
18	Win	18–0	Artjoms Ramlavs	UD	10	21 Dec 2019	Copper Box Arena, London, England	Retained WBO European junior-lightweight title
17	Win	17–0	Declan Geraghty	TKO	4 (10), 2:14	27 Sep 2019	Royal Albert Hall, London, England	Retained WBO European junior-lightweight title
16	Win	16–0	Jordan McCorry	UD	10	13 Jul 2019	The O2 Arena, London, England	Retained WBO European junior-lightweight title
15	Win	15–0	Sergio Gonzalez	TKO	2 (8), 2:02	28 Apr 2019	Wembley Arena, London, England	
14	Win	14–0	Lyon Woodstock	UD	10	6 Oct 2018	Leicester Arena, Leicester, England	Won WBO European junior-lightweight title
13	Win	13–0	Lester Cantillano	PTS	8	23 Jun 2018	The O2 Arena, London, England	
12	Win	12–0	Ivan Ruiz Morote	TKO	7 (8), 0:22	24 Feb 2018	York Hall, London, England	
11	Win	11–0	Rafael Castillo	PTS	8	9 Dec 2017	Copper Box Arena, London, England	
10	Win	10–0	Imre Nagy	TKO	2 (8), 1:32	16 Sep 2017	Copper Box Arena, London, England	
9	Win	9–0	Norbert Kalucza	TKO	1 (4), 2:59	8 Jul 2017	Copper Box Arena, London, England	
8	Win	8–0	Tamas Laska	TKO	3 (6), 1:31	20 May 2017	Copper Box Arena, London, England	
7	Win	7–0	Alex Phillips	TKO	2 (4), 1:42	24 Feb 2017	York Hall, London, England	
6	Win	6–0	Damian Lawniczak	PTS	6	8 Oct 2016	Harrow Leisure Centre, London, England	
5	Win	5–0	Reynaldo Cajina	PTS	4	9 Jun 2016	York Hall, London, England	
4	Win	4–0	Joe Beeden	TKO	3 (4), 1:36	25 Mar 2016	York Hall, London, England	
3	Win	3–0	Qasim Hussain	PTS	4	22 Jan 2016	York Hall, London, England	
2	Win	2–0	Dan Carr	PTS	4	30 Oct 2015	Harrow Leisure Centre, London, England	
1	Win	1–0	Laszlo Fekete	TKO	1 (4), 2:10	17 Jul 2015	York Hall, London, England	

Sporting positions
Regional boxing titles
Preceded by Lyon Woodstock	WBO European junior-lightweight champion 6 October 2018 – present	Incumbent
