= Reece Bellotti =

British boxer (born 1990)

Personal information
- Nickname: Bomber
- Born: 7 December 1990 (age 35) Watford, Hertfordshire, England
- Height: 5 ft 7 in (170 cm)
- Weight: Featherweight; Super featherweight

Boxing career
- Stance: Orthodox

Boxing record
- Total fights: 28
- Wins: 20
- Win by KO: 15
- Losses: 8

Reece Bellotti is an English professional boxer. He is a former British and Commonwealth super-featherweight champion and Commonwealth featherweight title holder. As an amateur, Bellotti won two ABA national championships, one at bantamweight in 2012 and the 2013 featherweight title.

== Early life ==
Reece Bellotti was born on 7 December 1990 in Watford, Hertfordshire. His father, like himself, is an electrician working in lighting in the film industry, while his mother is a manager at a pre-school. Bellotti started boxing at age 15 as a means to keep fit at the South Oxhey Boxing Club in Watford. He had his first amateur fight at the age of 17, and under the tutelage of amateur trainer Mick Courtney, Bellotti went on to win the ABA bantamweight championships in 2012, and again at featherweight in 2013.

== Professional career ==
Bellotti made his professional debut on 28 May 2015, at the York Hall in London, beating Joe Beeden by knockout (KO) in the first round. After winning his first nine fights, eight by stoppage, Bellotti's first title shot came against Jamie Speight on 1 July 2017, at the O2 Arena, London, on the undercard of the Frank Buglioni vs. Ricky Summers British light-heavyweight title fight. Bellotti defeated Speight by technical knockout (TKO) in the eighth round to capture the WBC International Silver featherweight title.

On 13 October 2017, he challenged Jason Cunningham for the Commonwealth featherweight title at the York Hall, London. The fight was the main event on a card televised on Sky Sports. In a back and forth contest, Bellotti dropped Cunningham in the fifth round with a right hook to the head. Cunningham made it to his feet and saw out the remainder of the round, only to be stopped by a barrage of punches in the sixth, giving Bellotti the TKO win and Commonwealth featherweight title. He would defend his Commonwealth title against Ben Jones on 2 February 2018, at the O2 Arena, London, again winning by sixth-round TKO, only to lose the title in his second defence against Ryan Doyle on 6 June 2018, suffering his first professional defeat via TKO in the fifth-round.

On 22 December 2018, Bellotti challenged British featherweight champion Ryan Walsh at The O2 Arena. Bellotti went the distance for the third time in his career, losing by split decision (SD), with one judge scoring the bout 116–113 in Bellotti's favour, while the other two scored it 116–112 to Walsh.

Bellotti once again fought for the vacant WBC International Silver featherweight title on 11 October 2019, against Italian Francesco Grandelli at the PalaTrento in Trento, Italy. Bellotti lost the fight via SD over ten rounds. One judge had Bellotti winning with 96–95, while the other two scored the bout 96–95 and 96–94 for Grandelli.

Bellotti became a two-time Commonwealth champion when he won the vacant title via eighth-round stoppage against Aqib Fiaz at the Echo Arena in Liverpool on 21 October 2023.

On 10 February 2024 at Indigo at The O2 in London, Bellotti was scheduled to face Liam Dillon for the British super featherweight title. He won the fight by unanimous decision.

He retained his titles on 15 February 2025 at the Co-op Live Arena in Manchester, when challenger Michael Gomez Jr retired at the start of round 10.

Bellotti faced European super-featherweight champion Ryan Garner at the Bournemouth International Centre on 26 July 2025, losing by 12th-round stoppage.

He faced Josh Padley at Sheffield Arena on 11 October 2025. Bellotti lost by unanimous decision.

Bellotti challenged WBO European super-featherweight champion Royston Barney-Smith at 3Arena in Dublin, Ireland, on 1 August 2026 with the vacant IBO Intercontinental super-featherweight title also on the line. He lost via unanimous decision.

== Professional boxing record ==
28 fights	20 wins	8 losses
By knockout	15	3
By decision	5	5

No.	Result	Record	Opponent	Type	Round, time	Date	Location	Notes
28	Loss	20–8	Royston Barney-Smith	UD	10	1 Aug 2026	3Arena, Dublin, Ireland	For WBO European super-featherweight title and vacant IBO Intercontinental super-featherweight title
27	Loss	20–7	Josh Padley	UD	10	11 Oct 2025	Sheffield Arena, Sheffield, England	
26	Loss	20–6	Ryan Garner	TKO	12 (12), 0:45	26 July 2025	Bournemouth International Centre, Bournemouth, England	Lost Commonwealth and British super featherweight titles; for European super-featherweight title
25	Win	20–5	Michael Gomez Jr	RTD	10 (12), 0:01	15 Feb 2025	Co-op Live Arena, Manchester, England	Retained Commonwealth and British super featherweight titles
24	Win	19–5	Levi Giles	UD	12	6 Jul 2024	Copper Box Arena, London, England	Retained Commonwealth and British super featherweight titles
23	Win	18–5	Liam Dillon	UD	12	10 Feb 2024	Indigo at The O2, London, England	Retained Commonwealth super featherweight title; Won British super featherweight title
22	Win	17–5	Aqib Fiaz	RTD	8 (12), 3:00	21 Oct 2023	Echo Arena, Liverpool, England	Won vacant Commonwealth super featherweight title
21	Win	16–5	Youssef Khoumari	UD	10	10 Jun 2023	Wembley Arena, London, England	
20	Win	15–5	Dean Dodge	TKO	7 (10), 0:42	22 Apr 2022	York Hall, London, England	
19	Loss	14–5	Raymond Ford	TKO	3 (10), 0:39	14 Aug 2021	Matchroom Headquarters, Brentwood, England	
18	Loss	14–4	Jordan Gill	UD	10	1 Aug 2020	Matchroom Fight Camp, Brentwood, England	
17	Loss	14–3	Francesco Grandelli	SD	10	11 Oct 2019	PalaTrento, Trento, Italy	For WBC International Silver featherweight title
16	Win	14–2	Josue Bendana	KO	4 (6), 2:13	21 Jun 2019	York Hall, London, England	
15	Loss	13–2	Ryan Walsh	SD	12	22 Dec 2018	The O2 Arena, London, England	For British featherweight title
14	Win	13–1	Brayan Mairena	PTS	6	27 Oct 2018	Copper Box Arena, London, England	
13	Loss	12–1	Ryan Doyle	TKO	5 (12), 1:02	6 Jun 2018	York Hall, London, England	Lost Commonwealth featherweight title
12	Win	12–0	Ben Jones	TKO	6 (12), 0:19	3 Feb 2018	The O2 Arena, London, England	Retained Commonwealth featherweight title
11	Win	11–0	Jason Cunningham	TKO	6 (12), 0:40	13 Oct 2017	York Hall, London, England	Won Commonwealth featherweight title
10	Win	10–0	Jamie Speight	TKO	8 (10), 0:58	1 July 2017	The O2 Arena, London, England	Won vacant WBC International Silver featherweight title
9	Win	9–0	Dai Davis	KO	3 (10), 2:52	17 Mar 2017	York Hall, London, England	
8	Win	8–0	Ian Bailey	RTD	7 (10), 3:00	26 Nov 2016	Wembley Arena, London, England	
7	Win	7–0	Rafael Castillo	TKO	3 (8), 2:14	29 Sep 2016	York Hall, London, England	
6	Win	6–0	Julio Buitrago	RTD	6 (8), 3:00	2 Apr 2016	Echo Arena, Liverpool, England	
5	Win	5–0	Elvis Guillen	TKO	7 (8), 2:41	30 Jan 2016	Copper Box Arena, London, England	
4	Win	4–0	Feycal Messaoudene	TKO	3 (6), 1:59	10 Oct 2015	York Hall, London, England	
3	Win	3–0	Adel Hadjouis	PTS	6	12 Sep 2015	The O2 Arena, London, England	
2	Win	2–0	Aron Szilagyi	TKO	2 (4), 1:18	4 Jul 2015	York Hall, London, England	
1	Win	1–0	Joe Beeden	KO	1 (4), 0:50	28 May 2015	York Hall, London, England	
