= Gary Hamilton (kickboxer) =

Irish kickboxer

- Born: 27 May 1980 (age 46); Belfast, Northern Ireland, U.K.
- Nationality: British
- Height: 174 cm (5 ft 9 in)
- Division: Lightweight, Featherweight
- Style: Muay Thai, Kickboxing (Full contact Oriental rules, Low-kick)
- Fighting out of: Belfast, Northern Ireland, U.K.
- Team: Prokick
- Trainer: Billy Murray

Professional boxing record
- Total: 8
- Wins: 2
- By knockout: 1
- Losses: 6
- By knockout: 1

Kickboxing record
- Total: 84
- Wins: 74
- By knockout: 28
- Losses: 8
- Draws: 1
- No contests: 1

Other information
- Boxing record from BoxRec

Gary Hamilton (born 17 May 1980) is a Northern Irish kickboxer, who is a former WKN World Full Contact champion in two weight-classes, featherweight and lightweight.

== Career ==
Gary Hamilton started competing at the age of 15 under patronage of former four-division world champion kickboxer Billy Murray at the Prokick gym in Belfast, Northern Ireland. As an amateur he has earned Ulster, Irish, British, European and world titles, prior turning pro in 2000. He has competed in all modern disciplines of kickboxing such as Full Contact, Low Kick, Oriental rules, and Muay Thai as well as in boxing.

Hamilton won his first WKN World Full Contact title at Featherweight in December 2002 in Lyon, France. He stopped the defending champion at that time Pastor Pascal in the fourth round. Hamilton made three successful title defenses prior losing the belt by decision against Patrick Kinigamazi on 2 May 2009 in Geneva, Switzerland.

On 2 October 2010 in Mazan, France, Hamilton challenged Bruce Codron for a vacant WKN World Full Contact title at Super Lightweight. The latter won the fight by decision after 12 rounds.

Hamilton made his Muay Thai debut on 31 January 2009 in Turin, Italy where he knocked out Filipo Cinti in the first round.

On 14 December 2013 Hamilton challenged the defending champion at that time, Daniel Zahra of Malta, for WKN World Super Lightweight title in oriental kickboxing. The latter retained the belt by knockout in the fourth round.

On 13 September 2014 Hamilton lifted his second WKN World Full Contact title at Lightweight in Belfast, Northern Ireland. He stopped Paolo Renna of Belgium in the fifth round.

Hamilton returned to the ring on 26 October 2019 in Belfast, Northern Ireland, where he faced Douglas Morrison of Scotland in a rematch, which co-headlined the event titled "Lord of the Ring". Their first encounter in February 2001 ended in favor of Hamilton, who won the bout by TKO in the final round. Hamilton won the second fight by decision after seven rounds.

== Titles ==
- WKN World Featherweight Full Contact title (including 3 successful defenses from 2002 to 2009)
- WKN World Lightweight Full Contact title (2014)
