= Louie O'Doherty =

English boxer (born 2000)

Personal information
- Nationality: English
- Born: 27 July 2000 (age 26)
- Weight: Lightweight; Light welterweight

Boxing career
- Stance: Orthodox

Boxing record
- Total fights: 13
- Wins: 12
- Win by KO: 3
- Draws: 1

Louie O'Doherty (born 27 July 2000) is an English professional boxer. He has held the British lightweight title since October 2025 and the Commonwealth lightweight title since May 2026. O'Doherty is also a former English champion in the same weight division.

== Career ==
A former gymnast, O'Doherty won the light-welterweight division at the 2022 England Boxing National Amateur Championships.

Unbeaten in his first five fights since turning professional in 2023, he claimed the vacant Southern Area lightweight title at York Hall in London on 24 February 2024, when his opponent, Marley Mason, retired on his stool at the end of the eighth round.

Returning to the same venue, O'Doherty became English lightweight champion on 21 June 2025, by dethroning defending title holder, Youssef Khoumari, via unanimous decision.

He faced Regan Glackin for the vacant British lightweight title at Braehead Arena in Glasgow on 4 October 2025. O'Doherty won when his opponent's corner threw in the towel during the 10th round.

On 16 May 2026 at the Keepmoat Stadium in Doncaster, he made the first defense of his title against the previously unbeaten Ahmed Hatim with the vacant Commonwealth lightweight championship also on the line. O'Doherty won by unanimous decision.

O'Doherty defended his British and Commonwealth titles against Michael Gomez Jr. at The O2 Arena in London on 17 October 2026. The fight ended in a majority draw with one of the ringside judges scoring it 115–114 for his opponent, while the other two had the bout a 114–114 tie.

== Personal life ==
Away from the boxing ring, O'Doherty works as a gymnastics coach.
