= Joe Joyce vs. Derek Chisora =

2024 Boxing match

Go Big or Go Home
- Date: 27 July 2024
- Venue: The O2 Arena, Greenwich, London, UK

Tale of the tape
| Boxer | Joe Joyce | Derek Chisora |
| Nickname | Juggernaut | War |
| Hometown | Putney, London, UK | Finchley, London, UK |
| Pre-fight record | 16–2 (15 KO) | 34–13 (23 KO) |
| Age | 38 years, 10 months | 40 years, 6 months |
| Height | 6 ft 6 in (198 cm) | 6 ft 2 in (188 cm) |
| Weight | 281 1/4 lb (128 kg) | 256 3/4 lb (116 kg) |
| Style | Orthodox | Orthodox |
| Recognition | WBC; No. 8 Ranked Heavyweight; IBF; No. 10 Ranked Heavyweight; WBO; No. 14 Ranked Heavyweight | WBC; No. 18 Ranked Heavyweight |

Result
- Chisora wins via 10–round unanimous decision (97–92, 96–94, 96–94)

Joe Joyce vs. Derek Chisora, billed as Go Big or Go Home, was a professional boxing match contested between Joe Joyce, and Derek Chisora. The bout took place on 27 July 2024 at The O2 Arena, with Chisora winning by unanimous decision.

== Background ==
In February 2018, whilst backstage at the O2 Arena in London for Lawrence Okolie vs. Isaac Chamberlain, Chisora met with David Haye and Joyce, where Chisora revealed Haye had contacted his manager Steve Goodwin and offered £60,000 for him to fight Joyce. Chisora later stated if the money was right, he would fight Joyce on the Tony Bellew vs. David Haye II card on 5 May. Two weeks later, Joyce defeated Rudolf Jozic via 1st-round KO. After the fight, Haye stated a new six-figure offer would be presented to Chisora, which would see him earn around the same purse he received in his loss to Agit Kabayel. On 1 March, speaking ahead of his next fight at the York Hall on 17 March against Donnie Palmer, Joyce stated that Chisora had rejected the offer to fight him. Joyce defeated Palmer via 1st-round KO.

On 24 March, Chisora regained composure following a loss against Kabayel in November, defeating Zakaria Azzouzi by stoppage in the second round. In the post-fight interview, Chisora proceeded to call Joyce and Haye over. Prior to calling them over, Chisora referred to Joyce as a Chihuahua. Chisora first asked Haye if he had confidence in Joyce and then stated, "In front of the British public on live television, I'll make a deal with you right now: if he (Joyce) beats me you write me a cheque of £1, if I beat him you give me your purse against Tony (Bellew) and your TV rights." Haye rejected the offer. Chisora then told Haye to not mention his name again. Haye told Sky Sports, "We offered him the same money he got for (Kubrat) Pulev, more money than he got for the European title, but you said no. Okay, we understand."

Chisora regained composure following a loss against Fury in 2022, securing a unanimous decision victory over Gerald Washington in 2023. Joyce regained composure following a loss against Zhang in 2023, securing a 10th-round KO over Kash Ali in March 2024.

On 22 May 2024, it was announced that Joyce would fight Chisora on 27 July at The O2 Arena in London. The bout was scheduled to be held on TNT Sports. In the build-up, Chisora spoke publicly of his desire to fight twice more after the match against Joyce, a sentiment supported by his opponent. Joyce weighed 281.2 pounds and Chisora stepped on the scales lighter at 256.7 pounds, but nearly 5 pounds heavier than his previous fight. Throughout the build up, Chisora teased Joyce about his stoppage losses to Zhang and at the weigh in, he wore a mask depicting the face of Zhang.

== Fight details ==
Chisora commenced the contest on the front foot, immediately dictating the tempo through a high volume of hooks and overhand rights that challenged Joyce's mobility. Joyce absorbed the early pressure while occasionally landing straight rights and uppercuts, but he remained predominantly on the back foot and encountered difficulties in establishing consistent range. Chisora's superior work rate and ring generalship earned him the majority of the opening rounds as both competitors engaged in vigorous, attritional exchanges. In the middle rounds, Joyce increased his activity, effectively cutting off the ring and unleashing powerful combinations that repeatedly forced Chisora to the ropes. Chisora endured the bursts of pressure, responding with precise counter hooks and uppercuts to counteract Joyce's momentum. While Joyce's volume and physicality enabled him to win several of these rounds, Chisora's resilience and cleaner single shots maintained a finely balanced contest. In the ninth round, Chisora timed a perfectly executed right counter, which sent Joyce to the canvas; Joyce recovered at the count of ten and promptly resumed his offensive. Both fighters entered the final round with the outcome still uncertain and exchanged heavy power shots in pursuit of a stoppage, prompting a standing ovation from the crowd at the O2 Arena. All three judges unanimously scored the fight in favour of Chisora, with scores of 97-92, 96-94 and 96-94. Compubox showed that Joyce landed 211 of his 835 punches thrown (25%) and Chisora landed 192 of his 564 thrown (34%). Chisora did have the edge on power punches, landing 163 compared to 151 from Joyce.

== Aftermath ==
Following Chisora's win, in the post-fight interview, Chisora said "I didn't say to people it was going to be a better fight than Dillian Whyte. I don't know where you put that. It was a great fight. I enjoyed it. It was beautiful, bro, it was beautiful, it was beautiful. It's hard to say goodbye, but it's almost time. You'll see me in Manchester next".

Joyce and Chisora both returned to the ring the following year. Chisora, received an IBF "eliminator" for the IBF heavyweight title, facing Otto Wallin in February, and Joyce, facing Filip Hrgović in April, following his original opponent Dillian Whyte pulling out. The two had previously fought within the amateur rankings in 2013 where Joyce had won.

== Fight card ==
Confirmed bouts:

| Weight Class | | vs. | | Method | Round | Time | Notes |
|---|---|---|---|---|---|---|---|
| Heavyweight | Derek Chisora | def. | Joe Joyce | UD | 10 |
| Super-featherweight | Ryan Garner (c) | def. | Archie Sharp | UD | 10 | | ^{Note 1} |
| Heavyweight | Moses Itauma (c) | def. | Mariusz Wach | TKO | 2/10 | 2:30 | ^{Note 2} |
| Super-bantamweight | Dennis McCann | def. | Ionut Baluta | UD | 12 | | ^{Note 3} |
| Super-featherweight | Royston Barney-Smith | def. | Brian Barajas | UD | 8 | | ^{Note 4} |
| Welterweight | Sean Noakes | def. | Inder Bassi | UD | 10 | | ^{Note 5} |
| Light-welterweight | Aadam Hamed | def. | Georgi Velichkov | PTS | 4 |
Preliminary Card
| Featherweight | Raven Chapman (c) | def. | Yohana Sarabia | UD | 10 | | ^{Note 6} |
| Light-welterweight | Brandun Lee | def. | Juan Anacona | PTS | 8 |
| Featherweight | Umar Khan | def. | Kaddour Hmiani | PTS | 8 |
| Lightweight | Jermaine Dhliwayo | def. | Engel Gomez | PTS | 4 | | ^{Note 7} |

^Note 1 For WBC International super-featherweight title
^Note 2 For WBO Inter-Continental heavyweight title
^Note 3 For vacant European super-bantamweight title
^Note 4 For vacant WBO Youth super-featherweight title
^Note 5 For vacant English welterweight title
^Note 6 For WBC International featherweight title
^Note 7 Dhliwayo's professional debut

== Broadcasting ==
| Country | Broadcaster |
| Country | Cable/Pay TV |
|---|---|
| United Kingdom | TNT Sports |

| Preceded by vs. Kash Ali | Joe Joyce's bouts 27 July 2024 | Succeeded by ~~vs. Dillian Whyte~~ vs. Filip Hrgović |
| Preceded by vs. Gerald Washington | Derek Chisora's bouts 27 July 2024 | Succeeded by vs. Otto Wallin |
