= Paul Fleming (boxer) =

Australian boxer

Personal information
- Nickname: Showtime
- Nationality: Australian
- Born: Paul Stephen Fleming; 3 April 1988 (age 38) Tully, Queensland, Australia
- Height: 175 cm (5 ft 9 in)
- Weight: Super Featherweight; Featherweight

Boxing career
- Reach: 177 cm (70 in)
- Stance: Southpaw

Boxing record
- Total fights: 32
- Wins: 28
- Win by KO: 18
- Losses: 2
- Draws: 2

Paul Fleming (born 3 April 1988) is an Australian professional boxer from Tully, Queensland who fought at the 2008 Olympics at featherweight. He was an Australian Institute of Sport scholarship holder.

Paul has since compiled a professional record of 26–0, with 17 knockouts. Paul most recently fought professionally on 15 March 2023, against Charly Suarez.

He is recognized in the Australian Olympic Committee list of Australian Indigenous Olympians. In 2020, the Australian Olympic Committee commissioned Fleming to complete traditional indigenous artworks. These works will appear on the official towels of all Australian athletes at the Tokyo Olympics.

== Professional boxing career ==
On 29 November 2008, Paul made his professional debut against veteran Shane Green scoring a 3rd-round TKO victory in the 6 round bout at the Maroochydore Rugby League Club, Queensland.

In 2010, the young Australian relocated to Sydney, to train with one of the countries World Champion trainers Billy Hussein at Bodypunch Boxing Gym. Under the guidance of Hussein, Paul was successful in his 4th professional bout against 25-year-old Kane Buckley scoring a 4th-round KO.

== Professional boxing record ==
32 fights	28 wins	2 losses
By knockout	18	1
By decision	10	1
Draws	2	

Key to abbreviations used for results
DQ	Disqualification	RTD	Corner retirement
KO	Knockout	SD	Split decision / split draw
MD	Majority decision / majority draw	TD	Technical decision / technical draw
NC	No contest	TKO	Technical knockout
PTS	Points decision	UD	Unanimous decision / unanimous draw

Boxing record
No.	Result	Record	Opponent	Type	Round(s), time	Date	Location	Notes
32	Loss	28–2–2	Ahmed Reda	UD	10	26 Jul 2026	Afterpay Arena, Sydney, New South Wales, Australia	
31	Draw	28–1–2	Jake Wylie	SD	10	6 Dec 2025	Gold Coast Convention Centre Gold Coast, Queensland, Australia	
30	Loss	28–1–1	Charly Suarez	TKO	12 (12), 1:58	15 Mar 2023	Kevin Betts Stadium, Mount Druitt, New South Wales, Australia	Lost WBC-ABCO and IBO Inter-Continental super featherweight title For WBA Oceania and vacant IBF Inter-Continental super featherweight titles
29	Win	28–0–1	Jackson Jon England	UD	10	23 Mar 2022	ICC Sydney, Sydney, New South Wales, Australia	Won WBC-ABCO, vacant IBF Pan Pacific and IBO Inter-Continental super featherweight titles
28	Win	27–0–1	Tyson Lantry	TKO	7 (10)	31 Mar 2021	Newcastle Entertainment Centre, Broadmeadow, New South Wales, Australia	
27	Draw	26–0–1	Bruno Tarimo	TD	3 (10), 3:00	16 Dec 2020	Western Sydney Stadium, Parramatta, New South Wales, Australia	For IBF International and interim WBA Oceania super featherweight titles
26	Win	26–0	Pungluang Sor Singyu	UD	8	21 Dec 2018	Emporium Function Centre, Bankstown, New South Wales, Australia	
25	Win	25–0	Virgil Puton	TKO	7 (8), 0:19	13 Dec 2017	Brisbane Convention & Exhibition Centre, South Brisbane, Queensland, Australia	
24	Win	24–0	Sadiki Momba	KO	2 (8), 0:28	13 Oct 2017	Emporium Function Centre, Bankstown, New South Wales, Australia	
23	Win	23–0	Jerope Mercado	TKO	2 (8), 2:04	8 Oct 2016	Convention and Exhibition Centre, Wan Chai, Hong Kong, China	
22	Win	22–0	Miguel Angel Gonzalez	UD	10	23 Apr 2016	Cebu City Sports Complex, Cebu City, Central Visayas, Philippines	Won WBC Continental Americas super featherweight title
21	Win	21–0	Akrapong Nakthaem	KO	2 (6), 2:59	13 Jun 2015	Entertainment Centre, Hurstville, New South Wales, Australia	
20	Win	20–0	Chaiyong Chanthahong	UD	10	28 Mar 2015	Mansfield Tavern, Mansfield, Queensland, Australia	
19	Win	19–0	Angky Angkotta	UD	8	21 Nov 2014	WA Italian Club, Perth, Western Australia, Australia	
18	Win	18–0	Ryusei Yoshida	TKO	4 (8), 1:07	6 Apr 2013	Venetian Arena, Cotai, Macao, China	
17	Win	17–0	Balweg Bangoyan	UD	8	16 Dec 2012	WA Italian Club, Perth, Western Australia, Australia	
16	Win	16–0	Eddy Comaro	KO	5 (8), 1:03	6 Oct 2012	Maroochydore Basketball Stadium, Buderim, Queensland, Australia	
15	Win	15–0	Chaiwirat Rongthaisong	KO	2 (6), 0:28	13 Jul 2012	Orion Function Centre, Campsie, Australia	
14	Win	14–0	Hwi Jong Kim	UD	6	6 Apr 2012	Orion Function Centre, Campsie, Australia	

Result	Method	Opponent	Venue	Date
Win	Knockout	Chaiwirat Rongthaisong	Orion Function Centre, Campsie	13 July 2012
Win	Unanimous Decision	Hwi Jong Kim	Orion Function Centre, Campsie	6 April 2012
Win	Technical Knockout	Thongchai Kunram	Sunshine Roller Skating Centre, Sunshine	2 December 2011
Win	Technical Knockout	Sonny Manakane	Homebush Sports Centre, Sydney	19 November 2011
Win	Technical Knockout	Quinton Donahue	Olympic Park Sports Centre, Homebush	29 July 2011
Win	Knockout	Juan Jose Beltran	Home Depot Center, Carson	9 July 2011
Win	Knockout	Joan de Guia	WA Italian Club, Perth	12 March 2011
Win	Unanimous Decision	Mick Shaw	Mansfield Tavern, Mansfield	14 October 2010
Win	Unanimous Decision	Michael Correa	Adeel’s Palace Receptions, Punchbowl	28 May 2010
Win	Technical Knockout	Manu Emery	WA Italian Club, Perth	22 May 2010

== Accomplishments ==
Paul Fleming won Bronze at the World Junior Championships in 2006 when he lost to Vyacheslav Shipunov.

Paul Fleming at 19 years old, had lost three times to long-time rival Luke Jackson but managed to defeat him and Taga Samueli Faialaga at the Oceanian Championships where he won his berth in the Olympic tournament.

Fleming was the first Australian to win the gold medal at the Pre-Olympic Chemistry Cup in Germany 2008.
