= Ryan Doyle (boxer) =

English boxer (born 1991)

Personal information
- Nickname: Ruthless
- Born: October 17, 1991 (age 34) Manchester, England
- Height: 5 ft 9 in (175 cm)
- Weight: Featherweight; Super-featherweight

Boxing career
- Stance: Orthodox

Boxing record
- Total fights: 24
- Wins: 18
- Win by KO: 9
- Losses: 4
- Draws: 2

Ryan Doyle is an English professional boxer who held the Commonwealth featherweight title in 2018.

== Professional career ==
Doyle made his professional debut on 2 March 2012, scoring a third-round technical knockout (TKO) victory against Michael Stupart at the Castle Leisure Centre in Bury, England.

After compiling a record of 9–0 (5 KOs), he faced Ian Bailey for the vacant International Masters Gold super-featherweight title on 27 September 2014 at the Olympia in Liverpool. Doyle suffered the first defeat of his career, losing via TKO in the tenth and final round.

He bounced back from defeat with a TKO win against Dawid Knade in March 2015 followed by a points decision (PTS) victory against Simas Volosinas in October. His next fight came the following month on 21 November against English featherweight champion Isaac Lowe at the Manchester Arena. The fight was scored a split draw (SD), with one judge scoring in favour of Doyle with 96–95, the second scoring in favour of Lowe with 97–93, while the third scored it even at 95–95. After a TKO win against Ismail Anwar in March 2016, Doyle fought for the vacant English title in a rematch with Ian Bailey on 16 July at the Victoria Warehouse in Manchester. Doyle dropped Bailey to the canvas in the first round en route to a unanimous decision (UD) victory to capture his first professional title. The three ringside judges scored the bout 99–90, 98–91 and 97–93.

Following a stoppage win against Tamas Laska in a non-title fight in November, Doyle fought for the vacant WBA International super-featherweight title against James Tennyson on 10 June 2017 at the Odyssey Arena in Belfast, Northern Ireland. Doyle suffered the second defeat of his career, losing via sixth-round corner retirement (RTD) after Doyle's trainer pulled him out of the fight before the start of the seventh.

He came back from defeat with two PTS wins to finish 2017–Lester Cantillano in October and Rafael Castillo in December–before challenging Commonwealth featherweight champion, Reece Bellotti, on 6 June 2018 at the York Hall in London. Doyle left the champion on unsteady legs in the fifth round after landing a right hand. He followed up with a barrage of punches to send Bellotti to the canvas, with referee Howard Foster immediately stepping in to call a halt to the contest, awarding Doyle a TKO win to capture the Commonwealth title. The first defence of his newly acquired title came four months later against Jordan Gill on 27 October at the Copper Box Arena in London. Doyle was dropped to the canvas in the seventh round and after a follow-up attack by Gill, the referee stepped in and stopped the contest to prevent Doyle from taking further damage, handing him the third defeat of his career. Doyle would get the chance to regain the Commonwealth title in his next fight, challenging the new champion, Leigh Wood, on 10 May 2019 at the Motorpoint Arena in Wood's home city of Nottingham. Doyle suffered his fourth defeat, being knocked to the canvas in the tenth round. Unable to get back to his feet, he was counted out while on the floor, resulting in a knockout (KO) loss.

== Professional boxing record ==
24 fights	18 wins	4 losses
By knockout	9	4
By decision	9	0
Draws	2	

No.	Result	Record	Opponent	Type	Round, time	Date	Location	Notes
24	Draw	18–4–2	Lee Connelly	PTS	4	2 Oct 2021	Leisure Centre, Oldham, England	
23	Win	18–4–1	Ibrar Riyaz	PTS	4	21 Dec 2019	Hilton Manchester Deansgate, Manchester, England	
22	Loss	17–4–1	Leigh Wood	KO	10 (12), 1:34	10 May 2019	Motorpoint Arena, Nottingham, England	For Commonwealth featherweight title
21	Loss	17–3–1	Jordan Gill	TKO	7 (12), 1:32	27 Oct 2018	Copper Box Arena, London, England	Lost Commonwealth featherweight title
20	Win	17–2–1	Reece Bellotti	TKO	5 (12), 1:02	6 Jun 2018	York Hall, London, England	Won Commonwealth featherweight title
19	Win	16–2–1	Rafael Castillo	PTS	6	17 Dec 2017	Victoria Warehouse Hotel, Manchester, England	
18	Win	15–2–1	Lester Cantillano	PTS	4	7 Oct 2017	Manchester Arena, Manchester, England	
17	Loss	14–2–1	James Tennyson	RTD	6 (10), 3:00	10 Jun 2017	Odyssey Arena, Belfast, Northern Ireland	For vacant WBA International super-featherweight title
16	Win	14–1–1	Tamas Laska	RTD	2 (8), 3:00	18 Nov 2016	Victoria Warehouse, Manchester, England	
15	Win	13–1–1	Ian Bailey	UD	10	16 Jul 2016	Victoria Warehouse, Manchester, England	Won vacant English featherweight title
14	Win	12–1–1	Ismail Anwar	TKO	2 (6), 2:04	19 Mar 2016	Victoria Warehouse, Manchester, England	
13	Draw	11–1–1	Isaac Lowe	SD	10	21 Nov 2015	Manchester Arena, Manchester, England	For English featherweight title
12	Win	11–1	Simas Volosinas	PTS	8	24 Oct 2015	Victoria Warehouse, Manchester, England	
11	Win	10–1	Dawid Knade	TKO	3 (4), 2:24	14 Mar 2015	Victoria Warehouse, Manchester, England	
10	Loss	9–1	Ian Bailey	TKO	10 (10), 1:05	27 Sep 2014	Olympia, Liverpool, England	For International Masters Gold super-featherweight title
9	Win	9–0	Michael Ramabelesta	PTS	10	8 Mar 2014	Bowlers Exhibition Centre, Manchester, England	
8	Win	8–0	Valentin Marinov	TKO	3 (4), 0:35	22 Nov 2013	Bowlers Exhibition Centre, Manchester, England	
7	Win	7–0	Pavels Senkovs	PTS	6	20 Sep 2013	Bowlers Exhibition Centre, Manchester, England	
6	Win	6–0	Maycol Cuevas	PTS	6	10 May 2013	Wythenshawe Forum, Manchester, England	
5	Win	5–0	Ignac Kassai	TKO	1 (4), 2:32	7 Dec 2012	Bowlers Exhibition Centre, Manchester, England	
4	Win	4–0	Elemir Rafael	TKO	3 (4), 2:08	22 Sep 2012	Bowlers Exhibition Centre, Manchester, England	
3	Win	3–0	Imran Khan	TKO	2 (4), 2:05	2 Jun 2012	Bowlers Exhibition Centre, Manchester, England	
2	Win	2–0	Sid Razak	PTS	4	21 Apr 2012	Sports Centre, Oldham, England	
1	Win	1–0	Michael Stupart	TKO	3 (6), 1:18	2 Mar 2012	Castle Leisure Centre, Bury, England	
