= Liam Dillon =

English boxer (born 1996)

Personal information
- Born: 5 January 1996 (age 30) London, England
- Height: 5 ft 7 in (170 cm)
- Weight: Super-featherweight, Lightweight, Super-lightweight

Boxing career
- Stance: Orthodox

Boxing record
- Total fights: 23
- Wins: 16
- Win by KO: 3
- Losses: 6
- Draws: 1

Liam Dillon (born 5 January 1996) is an English professional boxer. He is a former British and English super-featherweight champion and has also challenged for the Commonwealth super-featherweight and European super-lightweight titles.

== Career ==
A professional since 2017, Dillon won his first pro-title by claiming the vacant Southern Area super-featherweight championship with a seventh round stoppage of David Birmingham at York Hall in London on 9 March 2019.

At the same venue on 30 November 2019, he fought Youssef Khoumari for the vacant English super-featherweight title. The bout ended in a split draw with one ringside judge scoring in favour of each boxer and the third having it as a tie.

Returning again to York Hall on 9 October 2021, Dillon got his hands on the English title at the second attempt via a majority decision success over Dennis Wahome. Two judges ruled the fight his way 98–92 and 96–94 respectively, while the other had it a 95–95 draw.

He became British super-featherweight champion on 15 July 2023, taking the vacant title thanks to a split decision win against Qais Ashfaq at Vertu Motors Arena in Newcastle. Dillon knocked Ashfaq to the canvas in the fourth and ninth rounds but could not finish him off, so the outcome was decided by the judges with two awarding him the contest 117–110 and 115–112 respectively, while the third favoured his opponent 115–112.

Dillon lost his title in his first defense to Reece Bellotti, whose Commonwealth belt was also on the line when the pair met at Indigo at The O2 in London on 10 February 2024. Bellotti won by unanimous decision.

In his next fight, he challenged WBC super-featherweight International champion Ryan Garner at York Hall on 11 May 2024, losing via unanimous decision.

Dillon faced Pierce O'Leary for the vacant European super-lightweight title at Portman Road in Ipswich on 7 June 2025. He lost via unanimous decision.
