= Masood Abdulah =

English boxer (born 1993)

Personal information
- Nickname: Super Mas
- Born: 10 November 1993 (age 32) London, England
- Height: 5 ft 7 in (170 cm)
- Weight: Featherweight, Super-featherweight, Lightweight

Boxing career
- Stance: Orthodox

Boxing record
- Total fights: 15
- Wins: 14
- Win by KO: 8
- Losses: 1

Masood Abdulah (born 10 November 1993) is an English professional boxer. He held the Commonwealth featherweight title from September 2024 to February 2025.

== Career ==
Having won the lightweight division at the England Boxing Championships in April 2019, Abdulah turned professional in November that year.

Unbeaten in his first eight pro-fights, he claimed the vacant Commonwealth Silver featherweight title when his opponent, Marc Leach, retired on his stool at the end of the seventh round of their contest at York Hall in London on 6 October 2023.

Abdulah successfully defended his title against Qais Ashfaq at the Copper Box Arena in London on 10 February 2024. He knocked his opponent to the canvas three times in the fifth round before the fight was stopped.

Back at York Hall on 6 September 2024, he faced fellow undefeated boxer, George Stewart, for the vacant Commonwealth featherweight title. Abdulah won by unanimous decision.

With the vacant British featherweight championship also on the line, he made the first defense of his title against Zak Miller at Co-op Live in Manchester on 8 February 2025. Abdulah lost via majority decision with two of the ringside judges scoring the bout 115–113 and 115–114 respectively in favour of his opponent, while the third saw it as a 114–114 draw.

== Personal life ==
Abdulah's parents are from Afghanistan.

== Professional boxing record ==
15 fights	14 wins	1 loss
By knockout	8	0
By decision	6	1

No.	Result	Record	Opponent	Type	Round, time	Date	Location	Notes
15	Win	14–1	Adan Palma	UD	8	7 Nov 2026	Copper Box Arena, London, England	
14	Win	13–1	Thomas Essomba	TKO	10 (10)	13 Feb 2026	Rival Boxing Gym, Marbella, Spain	Won vacant IBO International featherweight title
13	Win	12–1	Alexander Morales	PTS	6	27 Jun 2025	York Hall, London, England	
12	Loss	11–1	Zak Miller	MD	12	8 Feb 2025	Co-op Live, Manchester, England	Lost Commonwealth featherweight title; for vacant British featherweight title
11	Win	11–0	George Stewart	UD	12	6 Sep 2024	York Hall, London, England	Won vacant Commonwealth featherweight title
10	Win	10–0	Qais Ashfaq	TKO	5 (10), 2:02	10 Feb 2024	Copper Box Arena, London, England	Retained Commonwealth Silver featherweight title
9	Win	9–0	Marc Leach	RET	7 (10), 3:00	6 Oct 2023	York Hall, London, England	Won vacant Commonwealth Silver featherweight title
8	Win	8–0	Lesther Lara	PTS	6	28 Jan 2023	Wembley Arena, London, England	
7	Win	7–0	Darwing Martinez	PTS	8	2 Dec 2022	York Hall, London, England	
6	Win	6–0	Stefan Nicolae	TKO	4 (6), 1:11	16 Sep 2022	York Hall, London, England	
5	Win	5–0	Tinko Banabakov	PTS	8	16 Jul 2022	Copper Box Arena, London, England	
4	Win	4–0	Sandeep Singh Bhatti	TKO	6 (6), 1:20	19 Mar 2022	Wembley Arena, London, England	
3	Win	3–0	Paul Holt	TKO	2 (6), 2:40	4 Dec 2021	Copper Box Arena, London, England	
2	Win	2–0	Petr Docekal	KO	1 (6), 0:40	17 Sep 2021	York Hall, London, England	
1	Win	1–0	Taka Bembere	TKO	2 (4), 2:37	27 Feb 2021	Copper Box Arena, London, England	
