= Bruno Tarimo =

Tanzanian boxer (born 1995)

Personal information
- Born: Bruno Melkiory Tarimo; 16 June 1995 (age 31) Rombo, Tanzania
- Weight: Super featherweight

Boxing career
- Stance: Orthodox

Boxing record
- Total fights: 34
- Wins: 28
- Win by KO: 7
- Losses: 4
- Draws: 2

Bruno Tarimo (born 16 June 1995) is a Tanzanian professional boxer and current Champion of International Boxing Federation International Super Feather title and Interim World Boxing Association Oceania Super Feather title. Tarimo resides in Southport, Queensland, Australia.

== Professional boxing career ==
Tarimo made his professional debut against Abdul Ali on 25 December 2013. He won the fight by a third-round technical knockout. He amassed a 23–2–1 record during the next six years. He won the Tanzania, WBA Oceania and IBF Pan Pacific super featherweight titles during this run.

Tarimo was booked to face Serif Gurdijeljac for the vacant IBF International super featherweight title on 31 August 2019, at the Hala Pendik in Novi Pazar, Serbia, which was his first fight outside of Australia and Tanzania. He won the fight by split decision. Two judges scored the fight 115–110 and 118–110 for Tarimo, while the third judge scored it 115–111 for Gurdijeljac.

Tarimo made his first IBF International title defense against Nathaniel May on 6 December 2019, at the ICC Exhibition Centre in Sydney, Australia. He won the fight by unanimous decision, with two judges scoring the fight 98–92 in his favor, while the third judge scored the fight 97–93 for him. Tarimo made his second IBF International title defense against Paul Fleming on 16 December 2020, at the Bankwest Stadium in Parramatta, Australia. The interim WBA Oceania super featherweight title was on the line as well. The fight was ruled a split draw by technical decision after the third round, as Fleming was unable to continue competing due to a head cut on Fleming, which was caused by an accidental clash of heads. Tarimo made his third IBF title defense against Kye MacKenzie on 21 April 2021, at the WIN Entertainment Centre in Wollongong, Australia. He won the fight by unanimous decision.

Tarimo faced the Commonwealth super-featherweight champion Zelfa Barrett in an IBF super featherweight title eliminator on 18 December 2021, at the Manchester Arena. He lost the fight by unanimous decision, with scores of 117–110, 117–110 and 116–111.

On 3 February 2022, Tarimo announced that he would drop down to super bantamweight, stating: "I have made 130 too easily for a long time, and now I want to fight at my real weight".

== Professional boxing record ==
34 fights	28 wins	4 losses
By knockout	7	1
By decision	21	3
Draws	2	

No.	Result	Record	Opponent	Type	Round, time	Date	Location	Notes
34	Win	28–4–2	(Tanzania) Juma Nassoro Juma	TKO	3 (8)	24 Feb 2024	Tasuba Hall, Bagamoyo, Tanzania	
33	Win	27–4–2	(Tanzania) Ali Mkojani	KO	5 (8)	18 Feb 2023	Mviringo Hall, Bagamoyo, Tanzania	
32	Loss	26–4–2	(Japan) Yoshiki Takei	TKO	11 (12), 2:17	13 Dec 2022	Ariake Arena, Tokyo, Japan	For OPBF super bantamweight title
31	Loss	26–3–2	(United Kingdom) Zelfa Barrett	UD	12	18 Dec 2021	(United Kingdom) Manchester Arena, Manchester, England	
30	Win	26–2–2	(Australia) Kye MacKenzie	UD	10	21 Apr 2021	Wollongong Entertainment Centre, Wollongong, Australia	Retained IBF International super featherweight title Won vacant IBO Inter-continental super featherweight title
29	Draw	25–2–2	(Australia) Paul Fleming	TD	3 (10), 3:00	16 Dec 2020	Western Sydney Stadium, Parramatta, Australia	Retained IBF International super featherweight title Won interim WBA Oceania super featherweight title
28	Win	25–2–1	(Australia) Nathaniel May	UD	10	6 Dec 2019	ICC Sydney, Sydney, Australia	Retained IBF International super featherweight title
27	Win	24–2–1	(Serbia) Serif Gurdijeljac	SD	12	31 Aug 2019	Hala Pendik, Novi Pazar, Serbia	Won vacant IBF International super featherweight title
26	Win	23–2–1	(Australia) Joel Brunker	UD	12	9 Mar 2019	Windsor Function Centre, Windsor, Australia	Won vacant IBF Pan Pacific super featherweight title
25	Win	22–2–1	(Australia) Josh English	MD	8	13 Oct 2018	Club Forster, Forster, Australia	
24	Loss	21–2–1	(Australia) Billel Dib	UD	10	11 Aug 2018	Seagulls Rugby League Club, Tweed Heads, Australia	Lost WBA Oceania super featherweight title
23	Win	21–1–1	(Australia) Billel Dib	MD	10	24 Mar 2018	Seagulls Rugby League Club, Tweed Heads, Australia	Won vacant WBA Oceania super featherweight title
22	Win	20–1–1	(Tanzania) Maulidi Bakari	UD	6	16 Dec 2017	Bagamoyo Country Club, Bagamoyo, Tanzania	
21	Win	19–1–1	(Tanzania) Faraji Sayuni	UD	10	13 Oct 2017	Chee Kwa Chee Pub, Bagamoyo, Tanzania	Retained Tanzania Professional Boxing Commission super featherweight title
20	Win	18–1–1	(Tanzania) Abdul Mwezemba	UD	10	2 Sep 2017	Chee Kwa Chee Pub, Bagamoyo, Tanzania	Won vacant Tanzania Professional Boxing Commission super featherweight title
19	Win	17–1–1	(Tanzania) Rashidi Abdallah Chande	KO	1 (6)	8 Aug 2017	Alliy Hassan Mwinyi Secondary School, Bagamoyo, Tanzania	
18	Win	16–1–1	(Tanzania) Festo Chiboni	KO	1 (6)	8 Aug 2017	Chee Kwa Chee Pub, Bagamoyo, Tanzania	
17	Win	15–1–1	(Tanzania) Sadiki Simba Saidi	UD	10	20 May 2017	Tasuba Hall, Bagamoyo, Tanzania	
16	Win	14–1–1	(Tanzania) Hussein Said	UD	10	16 Apr 2017	Chee Kwa Chee Pub, Bagamoyo, Tanzania	
15	Win	13–1–1	(Tanzania) Shabani Rambo	PTS	4	26 Mar 2017	Zulu Paradise, Dar-Es-Salaam, Tanzania	
14	Win	12–1–1	(Tanzania) Ally Bugingo	KO	3 (10)	5 Mar 2017	Chee Kwa Chee Pub, Bagamoyo, Tanzania	
13	Win	11–1–1	(Tanzania) Kasimu Hamad Haji	SD	10	20 Nov 2016	Chee Kwa Chee Pub, Bagamoyo, Tanzania	
12	Win	10–1–1	(Tanzania) John Amiri	PTS	4	12 Sep 2016	Chee Kwa Chee Pub, Bagamoyo, Tanzania	
11	Win	9–1–1	(Tanzania) Ally Hamisi	KO	1 (4)	8 Jul 2016	Chee Kwa Chee Pub, Bagamoyo, Tanzania	
10	Win	8–1–1	(Tanzania) Selemani M Kahengo	PTS	4	5 Jun 2016	Chee Kwa Chee Pub, Bagamoyo, Tanzania	
9	Win	7–1–1	(Tanzania) Juma Kani	UD	4	5 Mar 2016	Chuo Cha Sanaa, Bagamoyo, Tanzania	
8	Loss	6–1–1	(Tanzania) Abdallah Samata	PTS	4	31 Dec 2015	White House Hall, Kiwangwa, Tanzania	
7	Win	6–0–1	(Tanzania) Nobert Kigoma	PTS	4	24 Sep 2015	Chee Kwa Chee Pub, Bagamoyo, Tanzania	
6	Win	5–0–1	(Tanzania) Aidary Mussa	PTS	4	19 Jul 2015	Chee Kwa Chee Pub, Bagamoyo, Tanzania	
5	Win	4–0–1	(Tanzania) George Bale	PTS	4	14 Jun 2015	House Of Art, Bagamoyo, Tanzania	
4	Win	3–0–1	(Tanzania) Hassan Mwakifa	PTS	4	5 Oct 2014	Saadani Highway Lodge, Bagamoyo, Tanzania	
3	Draw	2–0–1	(Tanzania) Said Tete	PTS	4	29 Jul 2014	White House Lodge, Bagamoyo, Tanzania	
2	Win	2–0	(Tanzania) Tony Kameda	PTS	4	21 Apr 2014	Manyara Pub, Dar-Es-Salaam, Tanzania	
1	Win	1–0	(Tanzania) Abdul Ali	TKO	3 (4)	25 Dec 2013	Chuo Cha Sanaa, Bagamoyo, Tanzania	
