= Vicente Martín Rodríguez =

Argentine boxer (born 1985)

Vicente Rodríguez
Personal information
- Nickname: El Mono
- Born: Vicente Martín Rodríguez; January 22, 1985 (age 41) Eldorado, Argentina
- Height: 5 ft 7 in (170 cm)
- Weight: Super-featherweight

Boxing career
- Stance: Orthodox

Boxing record
- Total fights: 58
- Wins: 42
- Win by KO: 23
- Losses: 15
- Draws: 1

Vicente Martín Rodríguez (born January 22, 1985) is an Argentine former professional boxer. He challenged for the WBO super-featherweight title in 2011.

== Professional career ==
Rodríguez stepped it up a level in 2008 and was soundly beaten by Australian William Kickett by a lopsided 10 round unanimous decision loss.

He faced unbeaten Adrien Broner for the vacant WBO super-featherweight title, as part of a HBO tripleheader headlined by Canelo Álvarez vs. Kermit Cintrón at U.S. Bank Arena in Cincinnati, Ohio, USA, on November 26, 2011. Rodríguez lost by knockout in the third round.

== Professional boxing record ==
| 58 fights | 42 wins | 15 losses |
|---|---|---|
| By knockout | 23 | 6 |
| By decision | 18 | 9 |
| By disqualification | 1 | 0 |
| Draws | 1 | |

| No. | Result | Record | Opponent | Type | Round, time | Date | Location | Notes |
|---|---|---|---|---|---|---|---|---|
| 58 | Loss | 42-15-1 | (United States) Antwan Jones | TKO | 2 (8) | 2024-03-22 | (United States) Glass City Center, Toledo, Ohio, U.S. | |
| 57 | Win | 42-14-1 | (Argentina) Luis Angel Rojas | TKO | 4 (4) | 2023-11-11 | Santos Boxing Club, Santos Lugares, Argentina | |
| 56 | Loss | 40-14-1 | (United States) Trevor McCumby | KO | 5 (8) | 2023-05-06 | (United States) Celebrity Theater, Phoenix, Arizona, U.S. | |
| 55 | Loss | 41-13-1 | (Sweden) Oscar Ahlin | UD | 8 (8) | 2023-04-15 | Polideportivo Vicente Trueba, Torrelavega, Spain | |
| 54 | Loss | 41-12-1 | (United States) Roberto Garcia | UD | 8 (8) | 2023-03-04 | (United States) Hynes Event Center, Mercedes, Texas, U.S. | |
| 53 | Win | 41-11-1 | (Argentina) Juan Jose Dias | TKO | 2 (4) | 2022-11-12 | Santos Boxing Club, Santos Lugares, Argentina | |
| 52 | Loss | 40-11-1 | (Mexico) Carlos Ocampo | KO | 1 (8) | 2022-06-11 | (United States) Honda Center, Anaheim, California, U.S. | |
| 51 | Loss | 40-10-1 | (United States) Kevin Johnson | TKO | 3 (8) | 2022-05-21 | (United States) Davies Boxing and Fitness, San Antonio, Texas, U.S. | |
| 50 | Win | 40-9-1 | (Argentina) Juan Jose Dias | UD | 4 (4) | 2022-02-12 | Santos Boxing Club, Santos Lugares, Argentina | |
| 49 | Loss | 39-9-1 | (Ukraine) Arnold Khegai | UD | 10 (10) | 2021-12-18 | Ice Palace "Terminal", Brovari, Ukraine | |
| 48 | Loss | 39-8-1 | (United Kingdom) Youssef Khoumari | MD | 8 (8) | 2021-09-11 | Pavelló de la Vall d'Hebron, Barcelona, Spain | |
| 47 | Loss | 39-7-1 | (United Kingdom) Seán McComb | PTS | 8 (8) | 2021-08-06 | (United Kingdom) Falls Park, Belfast, Northern Ireland | |
| 46 | Loss | 39-6-1 | (Argentina) Maximiliano Nicolas Segura | UD | 8 (8) | 2021-01-23 | Arena Villa Carlos Paz, Villa Carlos Paz, Argentina | |
| 45 | Loss | 39-5-1 | (Tunisia) Hedi Slimani | UD | 10 (10) | 2016-11-11 | Sporthal De zwaluw, Zwevezele, Belgium | |
| 44 | Win | 39-4-1 | (Argentina) Raul Horacio Centeno | TD | 9 (10) | 2016-02-13 | Estadio F.A.B., Buenos Aires, Distrito Federal, Argentina | |
| 43 | Win | 38-4-1 | (Argentina) Diego Alberto Chaves | RTD | 9 (10) | 2015-10-09 | Estadio F.A.B., Buenos Aires, Distrito Federal, Argentina | |
| 42 | Win | 37-4-1 | (Argentina) Néstor Ramón Paniagua | UD | 6 (6) | 2014-03-08 | Club Deportivo San Vicente, Eldorado, Misiones, Argentina | |
| 41 | Loss | 36-4-1 | (Argentina) Sergio Javier Escobar | TKO | 3 (10) | 2013-04-05 | Club Deportivo San Vicente, San Vicente, Buenos Aires, Argentina | |
| 40 | Win | 36-3-1 | (Argentina) Oscar Jesus Pereyra | TKO | 7 (10) | 2012-08-24 | Auditorio Presidente N. Kirchner, Tapiales, Buenos Aires, Argentina | |
| 39 | Win | 35-3-1 | (Argentina) Sergio Javier Escobar | UD | 6 (6) | 2012-07-20 | Club Sportivo Escobar, Escobar, Buenos Aires, Argentina | |
| 38 | Loss | 34-3-1 | (United States) Adrien Broner | KO | 3 (12) | 2011-11-26 | (United States) U.S. Bank Arena, Cincinnati, Ohio, U.S. | For vacant WBO Super Featherweight title |
| 37 | Win | 34-2-1 | (Argentina) Mario Julio Ruben Martinez | UD | 8 (8) | 2011-07-15 | Salon Tattersall, San Isidro, Buenos Aires, Argentina | |
| 36 | Win | 33-2-1 | (Argentina) Alejandro Daniel Gomez | DQ | 6 (10) | 2011-04-23 | Club Vecinal, Munro, Buenos Aires, Argentina | |
| 35 | Win | 32-2-1 | (Argentina) Ramon Sebastian Munoz | TKO | 3 (8) | 2011-03-26 | Club Unión Progresista, Villa Ángela, Chaco, Argentina | |
| 34 | Win | 31-2-1 | (Paraguay) Victor Cardozo Coronel | KO | 3 (10) | 2011-01-08 | Club Atletico Lanus, Lanús, Buenos Aires, Argentina | |
| 33 | Win | 30-2-1 | (Paraguay) Ramon Elizer Esperanza | TKO | 3 (10) | 2010-12-17 | Casino Victoria, Victoria, Entre Ríos, Argentina | |
| 32 | Win | 29-2-1 | (Argentina) Miguel Leonardo Caceres | MD | 10 (10) | 2010-11-06 | Estadio F.A.B., Buenos Aires, Argentina | |
| 31 | Win | 28-2-1 | (Argentina) Oscar Alberto Mutuverria | RTD | 2 (6) | 2010-07-16 | Estadio F.A.B., Buenos Aires, Argentina | |
| 30 | Win | 27-2-1 | (Argentina) Bruno Horacio Godoy | KO | 4 (10) | 2010-03-13 | Estadio Parque Central, Neuquén Argentina | Retained interim Argentina (FAB) super featherweight title |
| 29 | Win | 26-2-1 | (Brazil) Mauricio De Lima | RTD | 3 (8) | 2009-12-12 | Gimnasio Malvinas Argentinas, Eldorado, Misiones, Argentina | |
| 28 | Draw | 25-2-1 | (Argentina) Claudio Rosendo Tapia | PTS | 3 (10) | 2009-06-27 | Estadio F.A.B., Buenos Aires, Argentina | |
| 27 | Win | 25-2 | (Argentina) Leandro Almagro | UD | 8 (8) | 2009-05-02 | Ce.De.M. N° 1, Caseros, Buenos Aires, Argentina | |
| 26 | Win | 24-2 | (Argentina) Adrian Marcelo Flamenco | TKO | 9 (10) | 2009-04-04 | Club Social y Deportivo Mar de Ajó, Mar de Ajo, Buenos Aires, Argentina | Won interim Argentina (FAB) super featherweight title |
| 25 | Win | 23-2 | (Argentina) Fabian Solis | KO | 3 (6) | 2008-11-07 | Eldorado, Misiones, Argentina | |
| 24 | Win | 22-2 | (Argentina) Martin Cruz Bergara | TKO | 4 (6) | 2008-10-18 | Villa Angela, Chaco, Argentina | |
| 23 | Loss | 21-2 | (Australia) William Kickett | UD | 10 (10) | 2008-08-22 | Wyong RSL Club, Wyong, Australia | |
| 22 | Win | 21-1 | (Argentina) Cesar Celso Nazario Romero | KO | 3 (10) | 2008-05-03 | Club Atletico El Palomar, El Palomar, Buenos Aires, Argentina | |
| 21 | Win | 20-1 | (Argentina) Leandro Almagro | SD | 8 (8) | 2008-03-22 | Sociedad de Fomento Crucecita Este, Avellaneda, Buenos Aires, Argentina | |
| 20 | Win | 19-1 | (Argentina) Diego Humberto Mora | TKO | 5 (12) | 2007-12-15 | Centro de Educación Física N° 6, Las Flores, Buenos Aires, Argentina | Retained WBO Latino super featherweight title |
| 19 | Win | 18-1 | (Argentina) Hugo Orlando Fernandez | UD | 10 (10) | 2007-09-08 | Gimnasio Municipal, Pergamino, Buenos Aires, Argentina | |
| 18 | Win | 17-1 | (Argentina) Gaston Isasmendi Sellan | UD | 12 (12) | 2007-05-26 | Gimnasio Municipal, Pergamino, Buenos Aires, Argentina | Won vacant WBO Latino super featherweight title |
| 17 | Win | 16-1 | (Argentina) Sergio Omar Priotti | RTD | 4 (10) | 2007-05-01 | Ce.De.M. N° 2, Caseros, Buenos Aires, Argentina | |
| 16 | Loss | 15-1 | (Argentina) Sergio Javier Benitez | SD | 10 (10) | 2007-03-03 | Ce.De.M. N° 2, Caseros, Buenos Aires, Argentina | |
| 15 | Win | 15-0 | (Argentina) Ricardo Fabricio Chamorro | UD | 6 (6) | 2006-12-09 | Club Belgrano, San Nicolas, Buenos Aires, Argentina | |
| 14 | Win | 14-0 | (Argentina) Carlos Alfredo Osorio | RTD | 4 (8) | 2006-11-11 | Gimnasio Malvinas Argentinas, Eldorado, Misiones, Argentina | |
| 13 | Win | 13-0 | (Argentina) Diego Alejandro Madole | UD | 6 (6) | 2006-10-21 | Estadio F.A.B., Buenos Aires, Distrito Federal, Argentina | |
| 12 | Win | 12-0 | (Argentina) Alejandro Daniel Gomez | UD | 6 (6) | 2006-09-02 | Club Estadio Master, Gregorio de Laferrere, Buenos Aires, Argentina | |
| 11 | Win | 11-0 | (Argentina) Julio Cesar Alganaraz | UD | 6 (6) | 2006-07-25 | Club Atletico San Miguel, San Miguel, Buenos Aires, Argentina | |
| 10 | Win | 10-0 | (Argentina) Norberto Adrian Acosta | TKO | 3 (6) | 2006-05-20 | Centro Municipal Nº 29, Santa Fe, Argentina | |
| 9 | Win | 9-0 | (Argentina) Diego Alejandro Madole | UD | 4 (4) | 2006-04-22 | Estadio Luna Park, Buenos Aires, Argentina | |
| 8 | Win | 8-0 | (Argentina) Alejandro Daniel Gomez | MD | 4 (4) | 2006-03-25 | Estadio Municipal, Perez, Argentina | |
| 7 | Win | 7-0 | (Argentina) Mario Julio Ruben Martinez | TKO | 2 (4) | 2005-11-26 | Estadio F.A.B., Buenos Aires, Argentina | |
| 6 | Win | 6-0 | (Argentina) Diego Ramon Acosta | UD | 4 (4) | 2005-09-24 | Polideportivo Municipal, Lujan, Argentina | |
| 5 | Win | 5-0 | (Argentina) German Omar Jesus Sanchez | TKO | 1 (4) | 2005-09-06 | Ce.De.M. N° 1, Caseros, Argentina | |
| 4 | Win | 4-0 | (Argentina) Jose Luis Avila | TKO | 1 (4) | 2005-08-20 | Ce.De.M. N° 2, Caseros, Argentina | |
| 3 | Win | 3-0 | (Argentina) Julio Ramon Escalante | TKO | 4 (4) | 2005-06-24 | Club Gimnasia y Esgrima, Ituzaingo, Argentina | |
| 2 | Win | 2-0 | (Argentina) Roberto Oscar Velazquez | KO | 1 (4) | 2005-06-04 | Instituto Provincial del Deporte, Posadas, Argentina | |
| 1 | Win | 1-0 | (Argentina) Julio Ramon Escalante | UD | 4 (4) | 2005-05-20 | Club Bochístico, Chascomus, Argentina | |
