= Zak Miller =

English boxer (born 1997)

Personal information
- Born: 21 March 1997 (age 29) Manchester, England
- Height: 5 ft 9 in (175 cm)
- Weight: Featherweight

Boxing career
- Stance: Orthodox

Boxing record
- Total fights: 19
- Wins: 17
- Win by KO: 3
- Losses: 2

Zak Miller (born 21 March 1997) is an English professional boxer. He is a former British, Commonwealth and English featherweight champion.

== Career ==
A former long-distance runner who represented Great Britain before switching his attention to boxing full-time, Miller went unbeaten in his first 13 professional fights.

He challenged British and Commonwealth featherweight champion Nathaniel Collins at Manchester Arena on 18 November 2023, losing by majority decision with two of the ringside judges scoring the fight 115–113 for his opponent, while the third had it a 114–114 draw.

Miller got back to winning ways in his next bout to claim the vacant English featherweight title thanks to a unanimous decision win over Lewis Frimpong at Oldham Leisure Centre on 1 June 2024.

He defeated Commonwealth featherweight champion Masood Abdulah at the Co-op Live Arena in Manchester on 8 February 2025, in a contest which was also for the vacant British title. Miller won by majority decision with two judges favouring him 115–113 and 115–114 respectively, overruling the third who scored the fight a 114–114 draw.

Miller vacated his British title in July 2025. He successfully defended his Commonwealth belt against Leon Woodstock at Planet Ice in Altrincham on 23 August 2025, winning the bout via unanimous decision.

After almost 15 months away from the competitive boxing ring due to a bicep injury during which time he gave up his Commonwealth belt, Miller returned to action against Gully Powar at Manchester Arena on 7 November 2026, with the vacant British featherweight title on the line. On the advice of the ringside doctor, the referee stopped the fight in the 10th round because of a huge swelling on Miller's head caused by an accidental clash of heads and it therefore went to the judges to decide the outcome with Powar awarded the win by unanimous technical decision.
