= Boxing at the 2004 Commonwealth Youth Games =

Boxing at the II Commonwealth Youth Games
- Dates: 29 November – 4 December
- Host city: Bendigo, Australia
- Venue: Bendigo Schweppes Centre
- Events: 6

Boxing at the 2004 Commonwealth Youth Games was held in Bendigo, Victoria in the months of November and December. This was the first time Boxing was introduced in the games. The chosen venue was the Bendigo Schweppes Centre.

The competition was fought over a knockout bracket using Amateur Boxing format - 3x2 minute rounds with 1 minute intervals. Boxing rewards point-scoring blows, based on the number of clean punches landed, rather than physical power, as judged by ringside judges.

All brackets and results are gathered from the official Commonwealth Youth Games returned results. In keeping with senior boxing tournaments, both defeated semi-finalists are awarded bronze medals.The 2004 Commonwealth Youth Games had male only boxing events in 54 kg (Bantamweight equivalent), 57 kg (Featherweight), 60 kg (Welterweight), 69 kg (Middleweight) and 75 kg (Cruiserweight).

== Medal table ==
* Host nation ( AUS)

Rank	Nation	Gold	Silver	Bronze	Total
1	ENG	6	0	0	6
2	AUS*	0	2	4	6
3	SCO	0	2	3	5
4	NIR	0	1	2	3
5	NZL	0	1	1	2
6	CKI	0	0	1	1
6	SAM	0	0	1	1
Totals (7 entries)		6	6	12	24

== 54kg Weight Category (Bantamweight) ==
=== Bracket ===
For male boxers whose 18th Birthday was later than 1/1/04 and weighed 54 kg or under

Quarterfinals
David Browne (Australia)	31
Desmond Samuels (South Africa)	20
Liam Walsh (England)	RSCOS R2
Rishi Kanta Singh (India)
Carl Frampton (Northern Ireland)	15
Angus Donaldson (New Zealand)	8
Tusiga Taala (Samoa)
Jason Hastie (Scotland)	RSCOS R3

Semifinals
David Browne (Australia)
Liam Walsh (England)	RSCOS R2
Carl Frampton (Northern Ireland)	19
Jason Hastie (Scotland)	24

Finals
Liam Walsh (England)	RSCOS R3
Jason Hastie (Scotland)

== 57kg Weight Category (Featherweight) ==
=== Bracket ===
For male boxers whose 18th Birthday was later than 1/1/04 and weighed 57 kg or under

Quarterfinals
Joel Brunker (Australia)	40
Leti Emelio Leti (Samoa)	16
Scott Gardner (New Zealand)	RSCOS R3
Mitieli Lacalevu (Fiji)
James McElvaney (England)	37
Manoj Kumar (India)	17
Thamasanqa Dubase (South Africa)
Joseph Kelso (Scotland)	RSCOS R2

Semifinals
Joel Brunker (Australia)	RSCOS R2
Scott Gardner (New Zealand)
James McElvaney (England)	RSCOS R2
Joseph Kelso (Scotland)

Finals
Joel Brunker (Australia)	24
James McElvaney (England)	38

== 60kg Weight Category (Lightweight) ==
=== Bracket ===
For male boxers whose 18th Birthday was later than 1/1/04 and weighed 60 kg or under

Quarterfinals
Lenny Zappavigna (Australia)	RSCOS R3
Mr Feroz (India)

Semifinals
Lenny Zappavigna (Australia)	16
David Appleby (Scotland)	23
David McComb (Northern Ireland)	27
Gary Barker (England)	34

Finals
David Appleby (Scotland)	19
Gary Barker (England)	28

== 64kg Weight Category (Welterweight) ==
=== Bracket ===
For male boxers whose 18th Birthday was later than 1/1/04 and weighed 64 kg or under

Quarterfinals
Gary McMillan (Scotland)	30
Sandeep Singh (India)	18
Patrick Murphy (Northern Ireland)	29
John Koen (South Africa)	26

Semifinals
Gary McMillan (Scotland)	18
Patrick Murphy (Northern Ireland)	19
Michael Hatwell (Australia)	8
Bradley Saunders (England)	31

Finals
Patrick Murphy (Northern Ireland)	12
Bradley Saunders (England)	33

== 69kg Weight Category (Middleweight) ==
=== Bracket ===
For male boxers whose 18th Birthday was later than 1/1/04 and weighed 69 kg or under

Quarterfinals
Ryan Pickard (England)	18
Desmond Samuels (South Africa)	11
Keve Tukia (Cook Islands)	37
Keneti Titali (Samoa)	26

Semifinals
Ryan Pickard (England)	RSCOS R3
Keve Tukia (Cook Islands)
Dean Russell (Australia)
Joseph Blackbourn (New Zealand)	RSCOS R3

Finals
Ryan Pickard (England)	30
Joseph Blackbourn (New Zealand)	23

== 75kg Weight Category (Cruiserweight) ==
=== Bracket ===
For male boxers whose 18th Birthday was later than 1/1/04 and weighed 75 kg or under

Quarterfinals
Andrew McKelvie (Scotland)	29
Unathi Jacobs (South Africa)	21

Semifinals
Andrew McKelvie (Scotland)	22
James DeGale (England)	36
Warren Fuiavailiili (Samoa)	22
Omar Shaick (Australia)	40

Finals
James DeGale (England)	RSCOS R3
Omar Shaick (Australia)
