= Headingley Rugby Stadium =

Rugby stadium in Headingley, Leeds

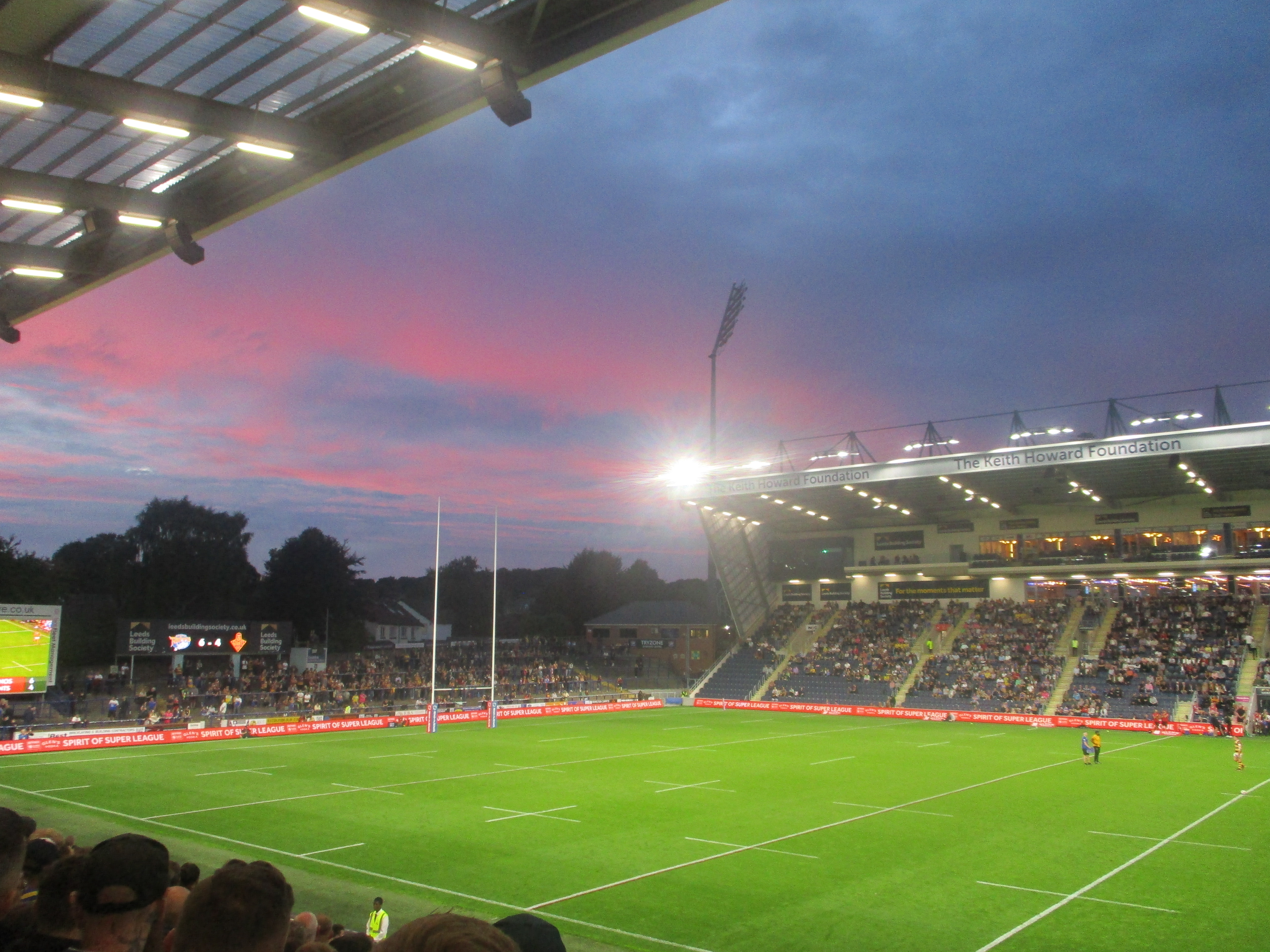
- Headingley, from South Stand
- Interactive map of Headingley Rugby Stadium
- Full name: Headingley Rugby Stadium
- Location: St. Michael's Lane, Headingley, Leeds LS6 3BR, West Yorkshire, England
- Coordinates: 53°48′58.87″N 1°34′55.82″W
- Owner: Leeds Rhinos
- Operator: Leeds Rhinos
- Capacity: 19,700 (rugby league)
- Surface: Grass and astro turf mix
- Scoreboard: Philips VideoTron
- Record attendance: All-time; 40,175 (Leeds v. Bradford Northern, 21 May 1947); Super League; 23,035 (Leeds v. Bradford Bulls, 2003)
- Field size: 115 yd × 74 yd (105 m × 68 m)
- Public transit: Headingley

Construction
- Opened: 1890
- Renovated: 1991, 2011, 2017–19
- Expanded: 1931, 1932, 2006

Tenants
- Leeds Rhinos (1890–present); Leeds Tykes (1991–2020); Bramley (1997–1999)

Headingley Rugby Stadium (known as AMT Headingley Rugby Stadium due to sponsorship) is a rugby league stadium in Headingley, Leeds and shares the same site as Headingley Cricket Ground. It is the home ground of the Leeds Rhinos, and is the fifth largest rugby league stadium in England.

== History ==
=== 1889–1980s: Construction and development ===
Leeds St Johns, who were later to become Leeds Rugby League Football Club then Leeds Rhinos, moved to Headingley in 1889 and built Headingley stadium. Leeds were founder members of the Northern Union in 1895 and Headingley hosted rugby league's first ever Challenge Cup Final in 1897.

In the 1930s, major developments took place on two sides of the rugby ground. The South Stand was completed in 1931, with some of the work being carried out by club players, while the old wooden North Stand was burned down during a match against Halifax on 25 March 1932. By the end of 1932, a new North Stand had been completed. The record attendance at Headingley was 40,175 for the rugby league match between Leeds and Bradford Northern on 21 May 1947. Undersoil heating was installed in 1963 but has since been removed due to ongoing problems, and floodlights were installed in 1966. The 1970 Rugby League World Cup final between Great Britain and Australia was played at the stadium before a crowd of 18,776.

The third and deciding Test of the 1978 Ashes series was played at Headingley before a crowd of 30,604.

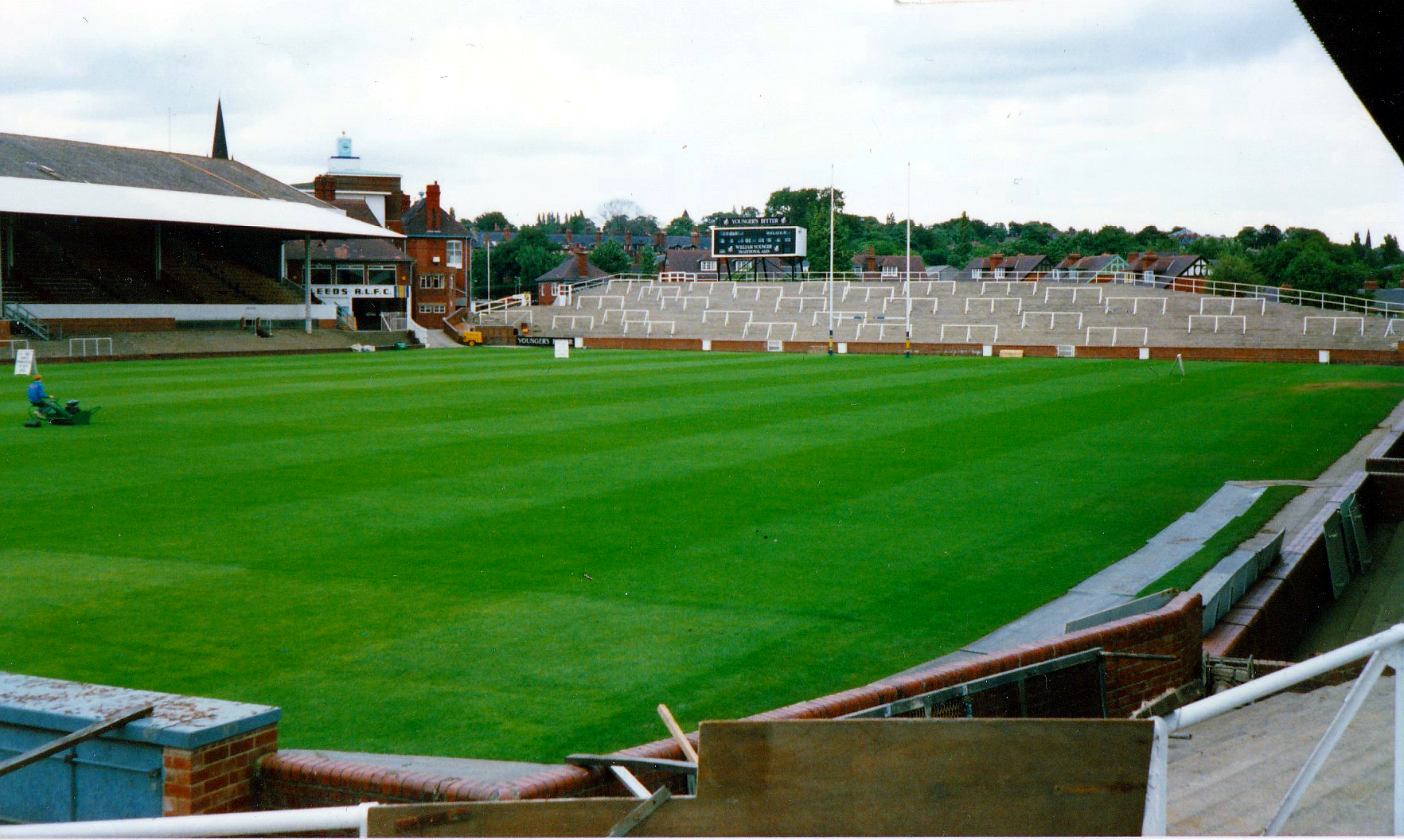
Headingley in the 1980s

=== 1990s–2000: Rugby union and World Cup games ===
New changing rooms were added in 1991, the same year Leeds RUFC were founded and moved into Headingley. In July 1998, Leeds RUFC came under common ownership with Leeds Rhinos, the two becoming part of the world's first dual-code rugby partnership, Leeds Rugby Limited.

Headingley only hosted one match of the 1995 Rugby League World Cup, held in England and Wales to celebrate the centenary of rugby league in England. Host nation England defeated rugby league minnows South Africa 46–0 in front of 14,041 fans.

Two matches of the 2000 Rugby League World Cup were held at Headingley which included England v. Fiji which England won by 66–10 in front of a crowd of 10,052 and latterly the quarter-final fixture between England and Ireland which England won by 26–16 and attracted 15,405 spectators.

=== 2001–2006: East Stand expansion and redevelopment ===
In 2001 capacity was increased marginally by extending the terracing around the corner in between the Western Terraces and the North Stand.

Since 2005 Headingley rugby stadium has been the venue for the annual varsity rugby union match between Leeds Beckett University and the University of Leeds which has attracted over 11,000 spectators.

2005 also saw the construction of the Carnegie Stand, built to replace the Eastern Terrace. The new stand had two tiers with 1,844 seats and hospitality suites. It was opened on 1 September 2006 for the Super League match between Leeds Rhinos and Warrington Wolves.

=== 2012–2015: More international games ===
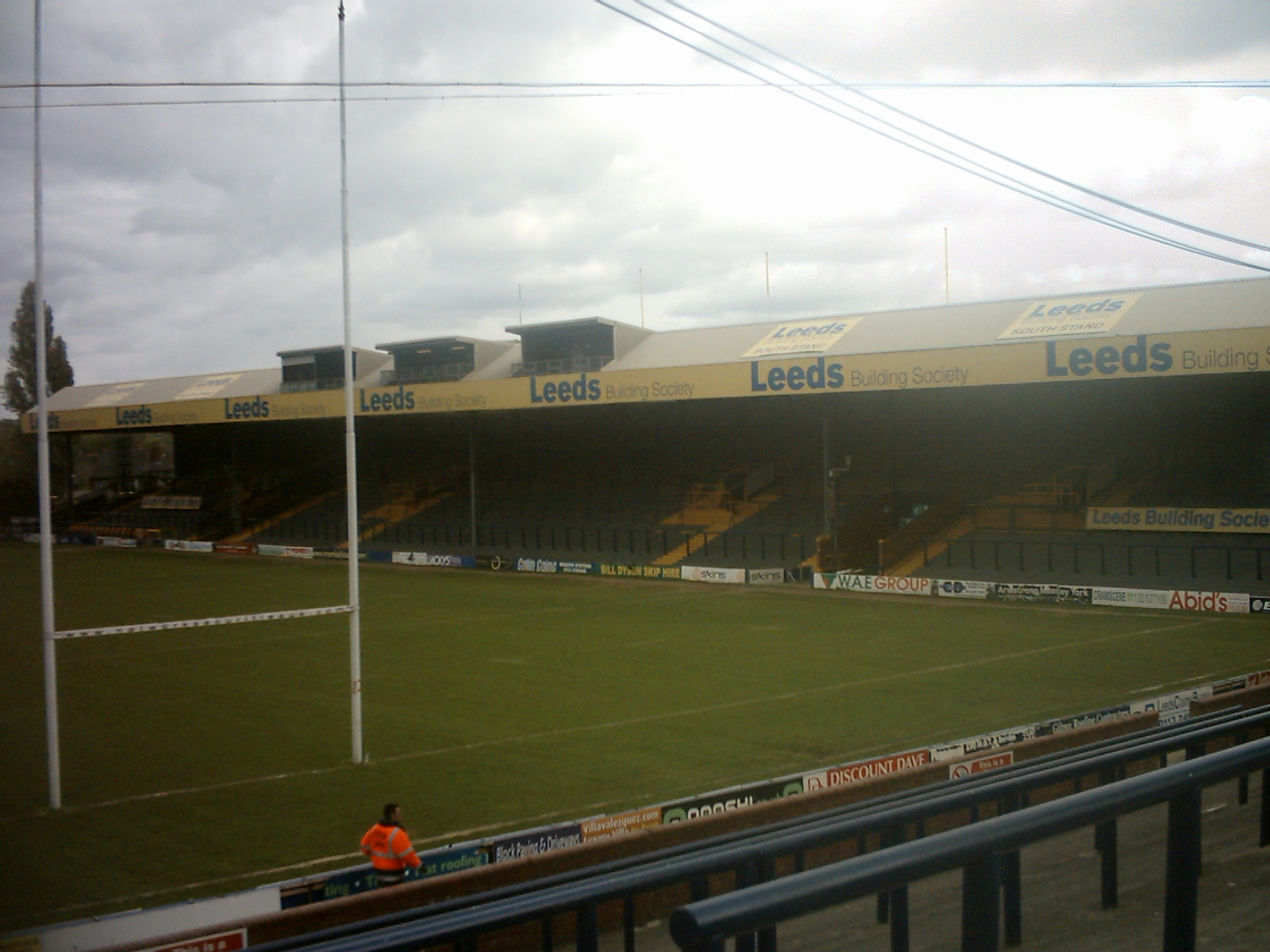
The former South Stand, built in 1931 and demolished in 2017

The 2012 World Club Challenge saw the stadium packed to its capacity when the home team, and Super League XVI Champions, Leeds Rhinos took on the 2011 NRL winners the Manly-Warringah Sea Eagles. A total of 21,062 turned out to see the Rhinos defeat Manly 26–12, the game being highlighted by Ryan Hall's 90-metre intercept try midway through the first half. This saw Leeds gain some revenge for their 28–20 loss to Manly in the 2009 World Club Challenge at Elland Road.

The stadium hosted two matches of the 2013 Rugby League World Cup: a Group B game featuring New Zealand, the defending World Cup Champions, and Papua New Guinea on Friday 8 November which the Kiwis won 56–10 in front of an audience of 18,180. Headingley also hosted a Quarter-final game on Friday 15 November between New Zealand and Scotland which New Zealand won by 40–4 to a crowd of 16,207.

In 2015 Headingley hosted New Zealand again for the first time since 2013 where they took on Leeds Rhinos as a warm-up for their test series against England. It also marked 120 years of rugby league being played at the stadium.

=== 2016–2019: Major redevelopment ===
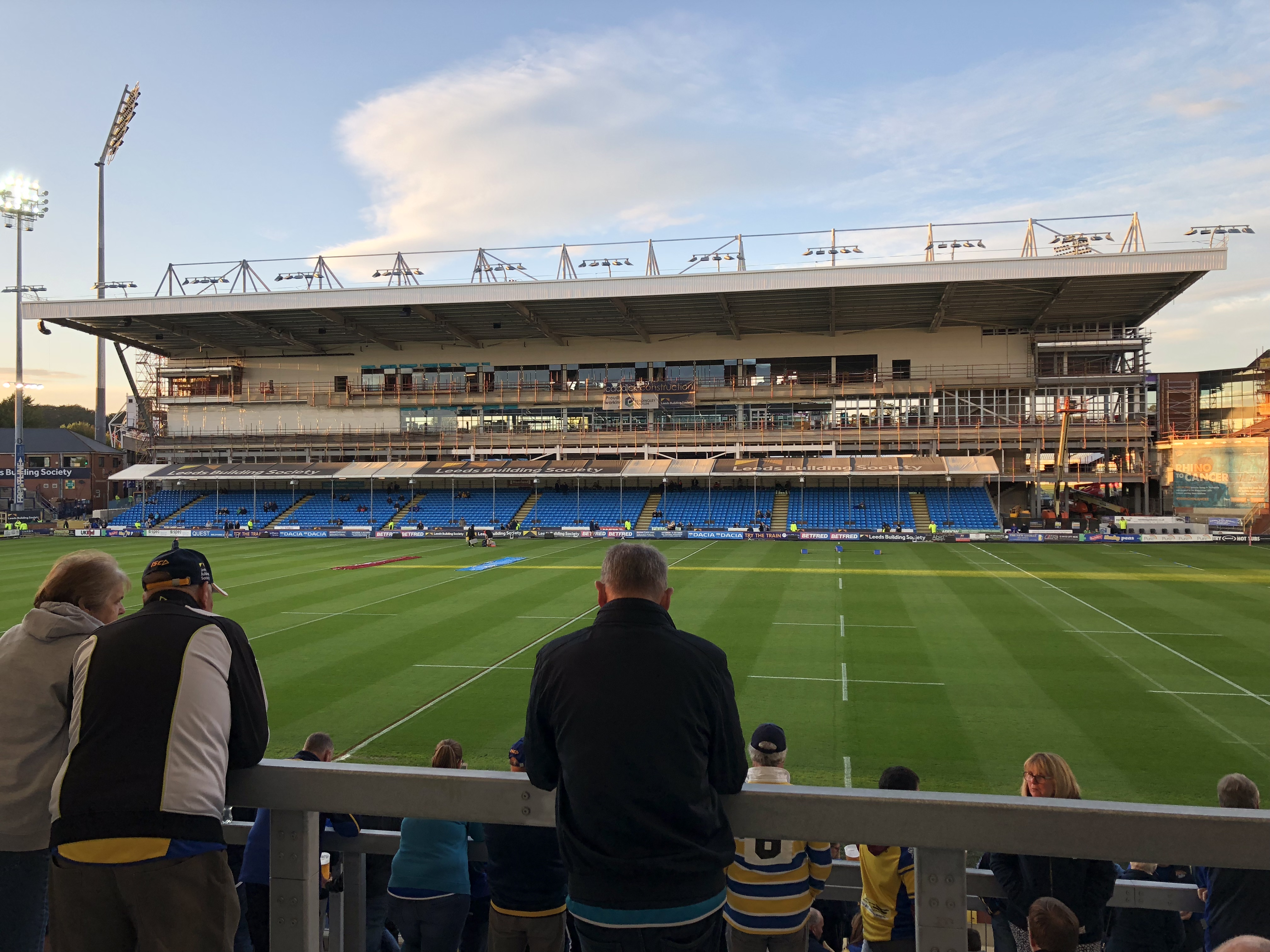
Construction of the new North Stand taking place in September 2018, with a temporary seated area located beneath the construction site

In January 2016, it was announced that the North and South stands were to be rebuilt as part of the overdue redevelopment of the stadium and adjoining cricket ground. Parts of the South Stand were condemned in 2011, and the club wanted to modernise the rest of the ground after the Carnegie Stand was completed in 2006. Financing for the £44 million redevelopment works on both the rugby stadium and cricket ground was secured from insurance and investment management group Legal & General in March 2017, with a further £10 million as well as a stadium sponsorship secured in June 2017 from Emerald Group Publishing.

The South Stand was demolished towards the end of the 2017 season with the North Stand following at the end of the season. Leeds Rhinos mostly continued playing at Headingley while construction work was underway on both stands, although two games were moved to Elland Road at the start of the 2018 season.

The new South Stand, housing up to 7,700 standing and seated supporters was officially opened in January 2019, while the North Stand, housing up to 3,800 seated supporters, opened in May 2019.

=== 2020–present ===
Following the loosening of COVID-19 restrictions in July 2020, Headingley was chosen alongside the Totally Wicked Stadium as the host of multiple rounds of Super League XXV, which were held behind closed doors following the restart of the Super League season on 2 August.

The stadium also hosted the 2022 Championship Summer Bash. The total attendance over the weekend at the stadium was recorded at 10,763, the lowest seen for a Summer Bash, with 4,011 recorded as attending the matches held on Sunday.

=== Future ===
The rebuilding of the North and South Stands in 2018 future-proofed the stadium. The only part of the ground that remains untouched is the Western Terrace. The club have explored possibilities of expanding the stand and putting a roof over it; however, owing to there being a public right of way and residential houses, plans have never been able to come to fruition.

== Layout ==
=== North Stand ===
Capacity- 3,825 (seated)

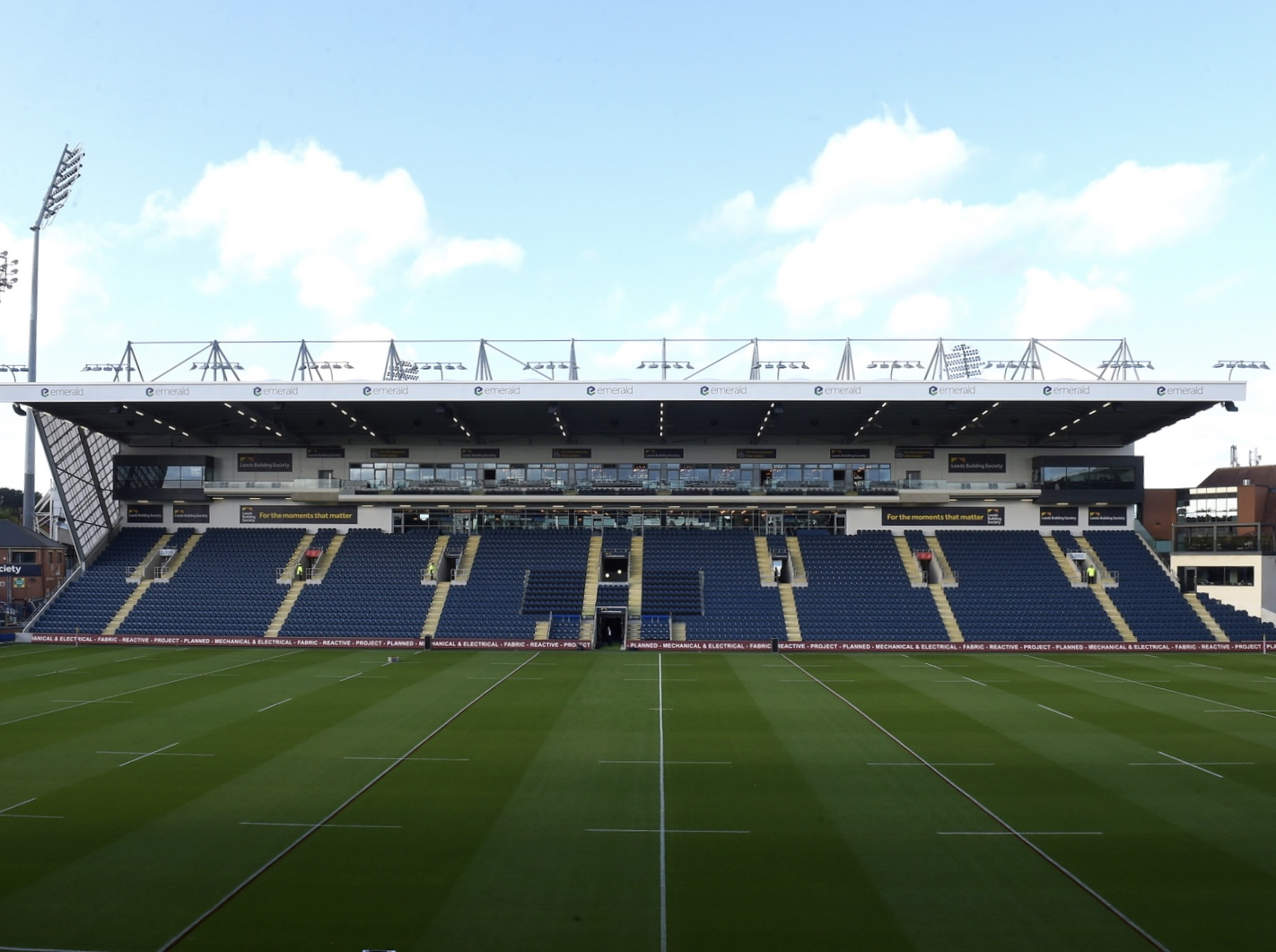
North Stand

The North Stand backs onto the cricket stadium. The stand also houses the changing rooms as well as the media and journalists and a banqueting suite that is shared by both the cricket and rugby grounds.

=== AMT Auto East Stand ===
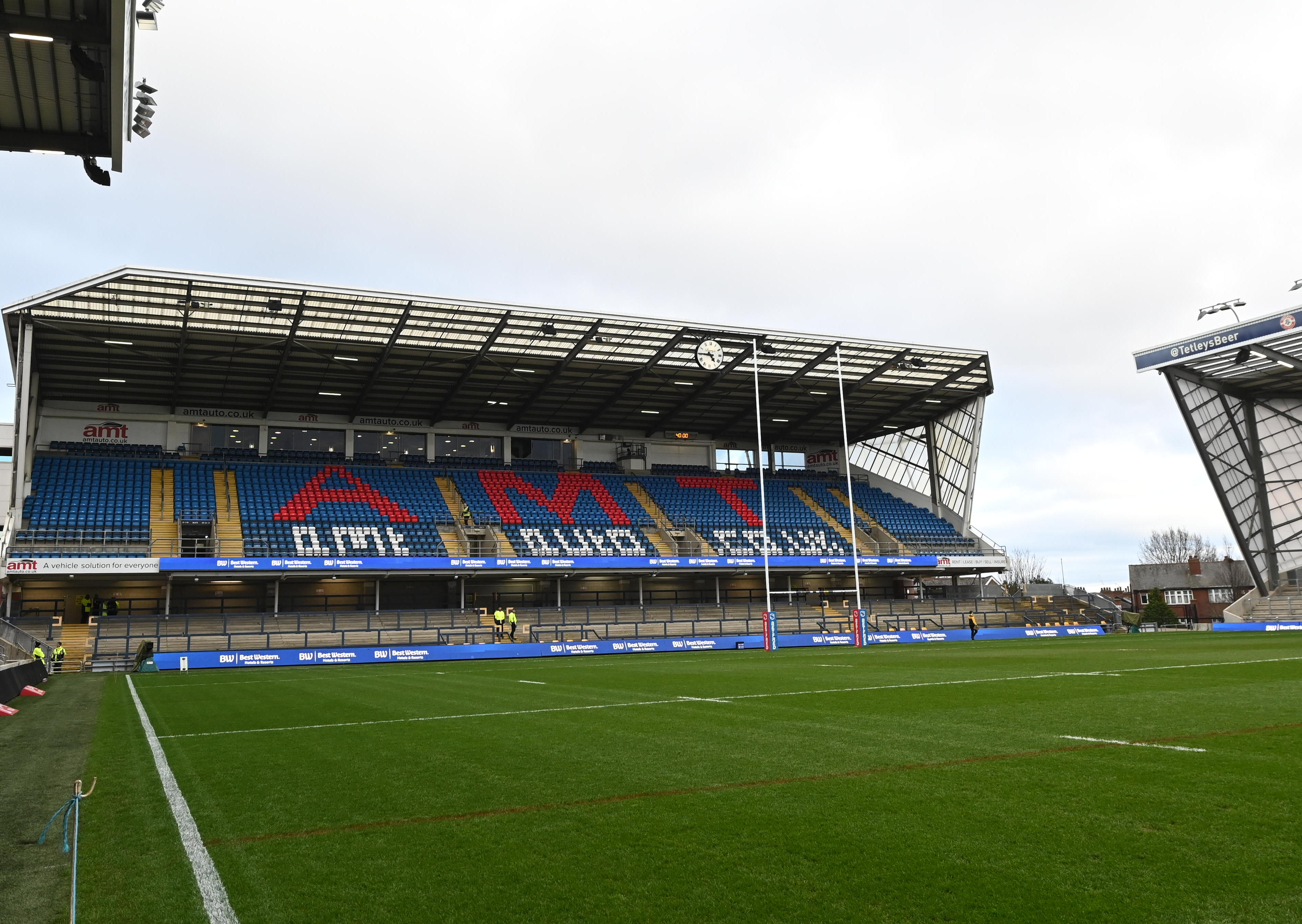
AMT Auto East Stand

Capacity- 4,550 (1,844 seated)
The AMT Auto Stand was completed in 2006 and replaced the Eastern Terrace. The stand has two tiers; the bottom contained terracing whilst the top contains seating, hospitality boxes, bars and a restaurant. It was originally known as the Carnegie Stand it has also been known as the Extentia Stand and Global East Stand.

=== South Stand ===
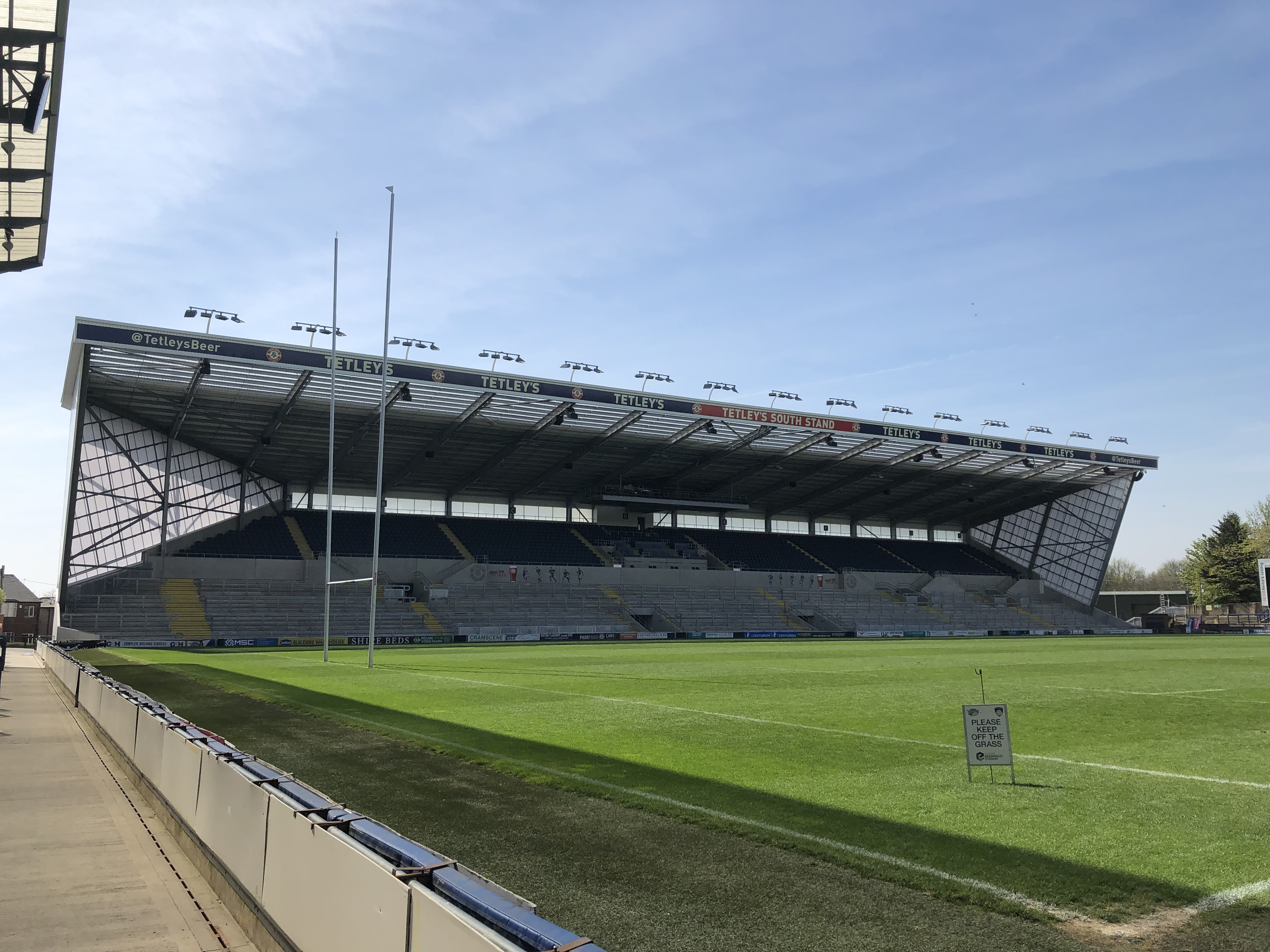
New South Stand

Capacity- 7,721 (2,217 seated) The South Stand is well known in rugby league for being the ground's popular side. The original stand was open to the elements but, following rebuilding in the 1930s, it was partially enclosed by a pitched roof. The roof was extended to cover the entire stand in the 1960s.

The stand was rebuilt in 2018 and contains two tiers, the bottom tier is terracing and the upper tier is seating. The stand also contains the TV gantry.

Before the replacement of the original roofs in 1999, the front of the South Stand featured a narrow spiral staircase, in full view of all spectators, via which television commentators accessed the television gantry on the roof. Rugby League commentator Eddie Waring claimed that, to brave the taunts and insults from fans as he climbed the stairs, he would sing the hymn, "Fight the Good Fight" to himself until reaching the sanctuary of the commentary box.

=== Western Terrace ===
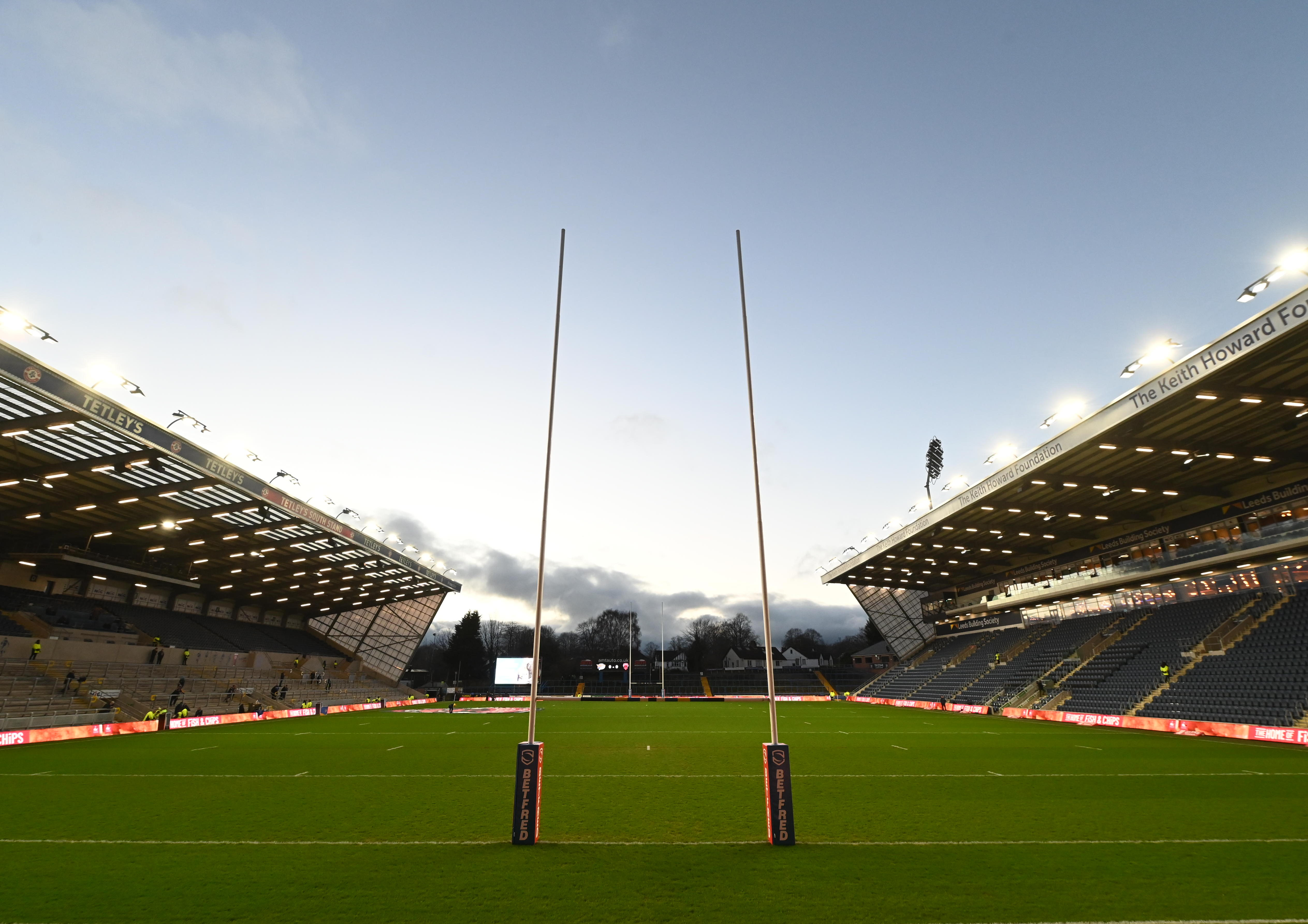
Western Terrace

Capacity- 3,604
The Western Terrace is the only part of the stadium not covered and houses the away fans. It is the only part of the ground that has had no major redevelopment nor are there any plans to do so as there is a public right of way and housing behind it. The biggest change to the Western Terrace is the permanent video board in the South West corner which replaced the temporary one in the North West corner.

== Sponsors ==
Headingley first sold naming rights in 1990 to brewers Bass following which the stadium's official name became Bass Headingley. Following the end of this arrangement the ground did not have another naming rights sponsor until 2006 when Leeds Metropolitan University took the rights during the construction of the Carnegie Stand.

In 2017, Headingley sold the naming rights to Bingley-based publishers Emerald Group during the redevelopment of the North and South stands. Emerald withdrew their sponsorship from the full Headingley complex in November 2021, after which the rugby stadium reverted to its original name of Headingley Stadium.

At the end of the 2023 season, Leeds announced a record-breaking 15-year sponsorship deal with Leeds-based car leasing company AMT.

Year	Sponsor	Name
1990–1994	Bass Brewery	Bass Headingley
2006–2017	Leeds Metropolitan University	Headingley Carnegie Stadium
2017–2021	Emerald Group Publishing	Emerald Headingley Stadium
2023–2038	AMT	AMT Headingley Stadium

== Other uses ==
=== Rugby League Internationals ===
==== World Cup matches ====
Headingley has hosted 12 World Cup games since England first hosted the tournament in 1960. The stadium will host three more games during the postponed 2021 World Cup.

Date	Winners	Score	Runners-up	Competition	Attendance
21 October 1960	Australia	21–15	New Zealand	1960 World Cup	10,773
24 October 1970	Great Britain	11–4	Australia	1970 World Cup	15,169
7 November 1970	Australia	12–7	Great Britain	1970 World Cup	18,776
16 March 1975	England	20–2	France	1975 World Cup	10,842
12 November 1975	Australia	25–0	England	1975 World Cup	7,680
9 November 1985	Great Britain	6–6	New Zealand	1985–88 World Cup	22,209
24 January 1988	Great Britain	52–4	France	1985–88 World Cup	6,567
14 October 1995	England	46–0	South Africa	1995 World Cup	14,041
4 November 2000	England	66–10	Fiji	2000 World Cup	10,052
11 November 2000	England	26–16	Ireland	2000 World Cup	15,405
4 November 2013	New Zealand	56–10	Papua New Guinea	2013 World Cup	18,180
15 November 2013	New Zealand	40–4	Scotland	2013 World Cup	16,207
15 October 2022	Australia	42–8	Fiji	2021 World Cup	13,366
24 October 2022	Ireland	48–2	Jamaica	2021 World Cup	6,320
30 October 2022	New Zealand	68–6	Jamaica	2021 World Cup	6,829
5 November 2022	New Zealand	48–10	Ireland	2021 World Cup	14,044

==== Women's World Cup matches ====
Date	Winners	Score	Runners-up	Competition	Attendance
9 November 2022	England	72–4	Brazil	2021 Women's World Cup	8,621
9 November 2022	Papua New Guinea	34–12	Canada	2021 Women's World Cup	8,621
17 November 2022	Canada	22–16	Brazil	2021 Women's World Cup	5,471
17 November 2022	England	42–4	Papua New Guinea	2021 Women's World Cup	5,471

==== Test matches ====
List of rugby league test matches played at Headingley.

Date	Winners	Score	Runners-up	Competition	Attendance
25 January 1908	Great Britain	29–7	New Zealand	1907–08 New Zealand tour	8,182
21 October 1921	Great Britain	6–5	Australia	1921–22 Kangaroo tour	31,700
15 January 1927	England	32–17	New Zealand	1926–27 New Zealand tour	6,000
9 November 1929	Great Britain	9–3	Australia	1929–30 Kangaroo tour	31,402
11 November 1933	Great Britain	7–5	Australia	1933–34 Kangaroo tour	29,618
16 October 1937	Great Britain	5–4	Australia	1937–38 Kangaroo tour	31,949
17 May 1947	Great Britain	5–2	France	1946–47 European Cup	20,000
4 October 1947	Great Britain	11–10	New Zealand	1947–48 New Zealand tour	28,445
9 October 1948	Great Britain	23–21	Australia	1948–49 Kangaroo tour	36,529
11 November 1950	England	14–9	France	1950–51 European Rugby League Championship	22,000
4 October 1952	Great Britain	19–6	Australia	1952–53 Kangaroo tour	34,505
25 October 1952	Wales	22–16	France	1952–53 European Cup	10,380
17 December 1955	New Zealand	28–13	Great Britain	1955–56 New Zealand tour	10,438
26 January 1957	Great Britain	45–12	France		20,221
14 March 1959	Great Britain	50–15	France		21,948
21 November 1959	Great Britain	11–10	Australia	1959–60 Kangaroo tour	30,301
30 September 1961	New Zealand	29–11	Great Britain	1961 New Zealand tour	16,540
17 November 1962	England	18–6	France		11,099
30 November 1963	Great Britain	16–5	Australia	1963–64 Kangaroo tour	20,497
21 October 1967	Great Britain	16–11	Australia	1967–68 Kangaroo tour	22,293
18 October 1969	England	40–23	Wales	1969–70 European Cup	8,355
24 February 1970	England	26–7	Wales	1969–70 European Cup	9,393
6 November 1971	Great Britain	12–3	New Zealand	1971 New Zealand tour	5,479
24 November 1973	Australia	14–6	Great Britain	1973 Kangaroo tour	16,674
29 January 1977	Wales	6–2	England	1977 European Cup	6,472
18 November 1978	Australia	23–6	Great Britain	1978 Kangaroo tour	30,604
21 February 1981	France	5–1	England	1981 European Cup	3,229
18 November 1982	Australia	32–8	Great Britain	1982 Kangaroo tour	17,318
17 February 1984	Great Britain	10–0	France		7,646
1 March 1985	Great Britain	50–4	France		6,491
6 February 1988	Great Britain	30–12	France		7,007
29 October 1988	Great Britain	30–28	Rest of the World		12,409
7 April 1990	France	25–18	Great Britain		6,554
16 February 1991	Great Britain	60–4	France		5,284
2 April 1993	Great Britain	72–6	France		8,196
6 November 1993	Great Britain	29–10	New Zealand	1993 New Zealand Tour	15,139
9 November	England	22–4	Wales	2003 European Cup	2,124
22 October 2006	England	26–10	France	Federation Shield	5,547
22 October 2006	Tonga	18–10	Samoa	2008 World Cup Qualifying	5,547
22 June 2007	Great Britain	42–14	France		12,685
4 November 2023	England	26–4	Tonga	2023 Tonga tour	15,477
2 November 2024	England	34–16	Samoa	2024 Samoa tour	16,068
8 November 2025	Australia	30–8	England	2025 Kangaroo tour	19,500

==== Tour Matches ====
Other than Leeds club games, Headingley has also seen Leeds, the county team Yorkshire and a Northern Union XIII (sometimes called English League) side play host to various international touring teams from 1911 to 2015.

Date	Winners	Score	Runners-up	Competition	Attendance
20 January 1908	Northern Union XIII	14–6	New Zealand	1907–08 All Golds tour	8,182
6 January 1912	Australasia	8–6	Leeds	1911–12 Kangaroo tour	1,000
19 October 1921	Australasia	11–5	Leeds	1921–22 Kangaroo tour	14,000
23 October 1929	Leeds	11–5	Australia	1929–30 Kangaroo tour	10,000
19 October 1933	Australia	13–0	Yorkshire	1933–34 Kangaroo tour	10,309
29 November 1933	Australia	15–7	Leeds	1933–34 Kangaroo tour	5,295
6 March 1935	English League	25–18	France	1935 French tour	15,000
1 December 1937	Leeds	21–8	Australia	1937–38 Kangaroo tour	5,000
27 October 1948	Australia	15–2	Leeds	1948–49 Kangaroo tour	13,542
24 November 1948	Yorkshire	5–2	Australia	1948–49 Kangaroo tour	5,310
22 November 1952	Australia	45–4	Leeds	1952–53 Kangaroo tour	20,335
13 October 1956	Leeds	18–13	Australia	1956–57 Kangaroo tour	24,459
16 April 1958	English League	19–8	France	1958 French tour	13,993
12 September 1959	Australia	44–20	Leeds	1959–60 Kangaroo tour	14,629
21 September 1963	Australia	13–10	Leeds	1963–64 Kangaroo tour	16,641
25 November 1967	Australia	7–4	Leeds	1967–68 Kangaroo tour	5,522
17 October 1978	Australia	25–19	Leeds	1978 Kangaroo tour	9,781
26 October 1980	New Zealand	25–5	Leeds	1980 New Zealand Kiwis tour	5,662
20 October 1982	Australia	31–4	Leeds	1982 Kangaroo tour	11,570
29 October 1983	Queensland	58–2	Leeds	1983 Queensland Maroons tour	5,647
19 October 1986	Australia	40–0	Leeds	1986 Kangaroo tour	11,389
21 October 1990	Australia	22–16	Leeds	1990 Kangaroo tour	16,037
5 October 1994	Australia	48–6	Leeds	1994 Kangaroo tour	18,581
23 October 2015	New Zealand	34–16	Leeds Rhinos	2015 New Zealand tour	20,158

==== World Club Challenge ====
Headingley has hosted five games of the World Club Challenge / Championship / Series between 1997 and 2016.

Date	Winners	Score	Runners-up	Competition	Attendance
18 July 1997	Leeds Rhinos	22–14	Adelaide Rams	1997 World Club Championship	11,269
3 August 1997	North Queensland Cowboys	48–14	Leeds Rhinos	1997 World Club Championship	12,224
17 February 2012	Leeds Rhinos	26–12	Manly-Warringah Sea Eagles	2012 World Club Challenge	21,062
22 February 2013	Melbourne Storm	18–14	Leeds Rhinos	2013 World Club Challenge	20,400
21 February 2016	North Queensland Cowboys	38–4	Leeds Rhinos	2016 World Club Series	19,778

=== Rugby League Finals ===
==== First Division finals ====
The ground has hosted six of the old First Division Finals. The first being in 1914 when Salford beat Huddersfield and the last in 1968 when Wakefield beat Hull KR.

Since Super League inception in 1996, Old Trafford has hosted all but one Grand Final.

Season	Champions	Score	Runners-up	Attendance
1913–14	Salford	5–3	Huddersfield	8,091
1919–20	Hull F.C.	3–2	Huddersfield	12,900
1920–21	Hull F.C.	16–14	Hull Kingston Rovers	10,000
1922–23	Hull Kingston Rovers	15–5	Huddersfield	14,000
1966–67	Wakefield Trinity	7–7	St. Helens	20,161
1967–68	Wakefield Trinity	17–10	Hull Kingston Rovers	22,586

==== Second Division finals ====
Headingley hosted its first Championship Grand Final in 2007 when Castleford beat Widnes in front of 20,000 people to be promoted to Super League. The event returned in 2014 when Leigh beat Featherstone however they were not promoted due to Super League then licensing period.

Year	Winners	Score	Runner-up	Attendance
2007	Castleford	42–10	Widnes	20,814
2014	Leigh	36–12	Featherstone	9,164

==== Third Division finals ====
As part of the Championship Finals that included the Championship Grand Final, Headingley hosted the Championship 1 Grand Finals

Year	Winners	Score	Runner-up	Attendance
2007	Featherstone	24–6	Oldham	
2014	Hunslet	17–16	Oldham	9,167

==== Challenge Cup Semi-finals ====
Headingley has hosted 13 Challenge Cup semi finals and one replay since 1981. The last semi final to be held at Headingley was in 2015 when Hull KR beat Warrington. In recent years the semi-finals have been held at one neutral venue as a double header.

Year	Winner	Score	Loser
1981	Hull Kingston Rovers	22–5	St. Helens
1982	Hull	15–11	Castleford
1983	Featherstone Rovers	11–6	Bradford Northern
1985	Hull	10–10	Castleford
R	Hull	22–16	Castleford
1987	Halifax	12–8	Widnes
1988	Halifax	0–0	Hull
1992	Castleford	8–4	Hull
1994	Wigan	20–6	Castleford
1998	Sheffield Eagles	22–18	Salford
1999	London Broncos	33–27	Castleford
2000	Bradford	44–20	Warrington
2002	Wigan	20–10	Castleford
2015	Hull Kingston Rovers	26–18	Warrington

=== Boxing ===
Date	Main fight	Undercard	Attendance
4 September 2021	Josh Warrington v Mauricio Lara II	Jovanni Straffon vs Maxi Hughes	20,000

=== Concerts ===
Date	Performer(s)	Opening act(s)	Tour/event	Attendance
12 June 2027	Paul Heaton	Echo and the Bunnymen		

Preceded by Sydney Cricket Ground; 1968	Rugby League World Cup; Final venue 1970	Succeeded by Stade de Gerland; 1972
