= John Cootes =

Australia international rugby league player (born 1941)

Personal information
- Born: 19 August 1941 (age 85) Sydney, Australia

Playing information
- Position: Centre, Wing
Club
| Years | Team | Pld | T | G | FG | P |
|---|---|---|---|---|---|---|
| 1967–73 | Wests (Newcastle) | 83 |
Representative
| Years | Team | Pld | T | G | FG | P |
| | Newcastle |
| 1967–70 | Country NSW | 3 | 2 | 9 | | 24 |
| 1969–70 | New South Wales | 5 | 4 | 1 | | 13 |
| 1969–70 | Australia | 7 | 6 | 0 | 0 | 18 |

John Cootes (born 19 August 1941), nicknamed "the footballing priest", is an Australian former professional rugby league footballer who played in the 1960s and 1970s, and Roman Catholic priest. An Australia international representative three-quarter back and adept goal-kicker, he played club football in the Newcastle Rugby League for Western Suburbs during the 1960s and also later worked as a television commentator and presenter.

Cootes hailed from Newcastle and was trained during childhood by Clive Churchill and later played for the Lazio rugby union club in 1966 while on scholarship to study theology at Rome's Propaganda College.

In 1967 he commenced playing in the Newcastle Rugby League for Western Suburbs.

Father John Cootes became the first Roman Catholic priest to play international rugby league when he was selected for Australia's tour of New Zealand in 1969. Also that year he was named New South Wales' Country Rugby League player of the year. He made appearances for Australia as a three-quarter back in 1969 and 1970. He played in the Newcastle Rugby League grand final-winning Wests side in 1970. Cootes' last Test match was the final of the 1970 World Cup which was against Great Britain at the Headingley ground in Leeds, England. A particularly violent match, Australia won 12–7, with Cootes crossing in the first half, becoming the tournament's top try-scorer.

Having obtained a dispensation to marry, Cootes wed in 1972 in Arizona, US. Eventually he left the priesthood and opened a chain of furniture stores in New South Wales. After football, Cootes also enjoyed a long and successful media career, becoming a sports commentator for Channel 10. In 1979 he was appointed as John Singleton's replacement as host of Channel 10's Saturday Night Live programme. He left Channel 10 in 1983 to concentrate on a business venture, but returned to television in 1986.

He was named at centre in West Rosellas RLFC's team of the century.
