= Dennis Tubieron =

Filipino boxer

Personal information
- Nickname: The Scorpion
- Nationality: (Philippines) Filipino
- Born: Diohines Reguma Tubieron; December 28, 1989 (age 36) Puerto Princesa City, Palawan, Philippines
- Height: 5 ft 6 in (1.68 m)
- Weight: Bantamweight; Featherweight

Boxing career
- Stance: Southpaw

Boxing record
- Total fights: 29
- Wins: 19
- Win by KO: 8
- Losses: 8
- Draws: 2
- No contests: 0

Diohines Reguma Tubieron (born 28 December 1989) is a Filipino professional boxer from Puerto Princesa City, Palawan, Philippines. Also known as Dennis "Scorpion" Tubieron by his ring moniker.

Tubieron is a former WBC International Bantamweight champion.

== Amateur career ==
At the age of 17, Tubieron became the trainer of Kalayaan National High School boxing team which later won an overall gold medal in the Palarong NCR boxing division. The victory in the regional level earned the team's opportunity to compete at the national competition. In the 52nd Palarong Pambansa (Filipino for "National Games") was held in Tacloban City, Leyte. The student participants of KNHS boxing team won 1 gold, 2 silver and 2 bronze medals respectively.

Tubieron juggled his amateur boxing career and high school studies to be able to help his family financially. Tubieron eventually decided to discontinue his high school education to pursue a career in professional boxing.

== Professional career ==
In 2009 at the age of 19, he joined Ariscon's boxing stable. After three years, he was eventually led to Gabriel "Bebot" Elorde's boxing stable and continued his boxing career under his management. He currently resides in Sucat, Parañaque and is training under the Elorde boxing stable.

Tubieron made his professional debut on June 20, 2009, against fellow Filipino Claver Ventolero. The bout took place in Muntinlupa Sports Complex, Tunasan, Muntinlupa, Metro Manila and he won via a unanimous decision.

On September 8, 2012, Tubieron won the WBC International Bantamweight title by defeating the Japanese defending champion Hiroki Shiino by eight-round Technical Knockout.

On March 16, 2013, Tubieron defended the WBC International Bantamweight title against the Indonesian challenger James Mokoginta. Tubieron won the fight via third-round Technical Knockout. The boxing event was held at the PAGCOR Grand Theater, Airport Casino Filipino, Parañaque, Metro Manila.

On September 26, 2014, Tubieron scored a minor upset over highly touted Featherweight prospect Rogelio Jun Doliguez in the headliner of Saved By The Bell Promotions’ boxing card held at the Mandaluyong City Gymnasium. Tubieron had his hand raised in victory via Technical Majority Decision with the scores of 47-47, 47-46 and 47–46 after Doliguez suffered a deep cut on his forehead following a clash of heads, prompting referee Sammy Bernabe Sr. to halt the contest at the end of round five.

On December 28, 2014, he fought to a draw against Carlo Magali for the vacant WBC International Featherweight championship. Magali suffered a cut on his right eyelid from an accidental clash of heads. The automatic point deduction prevented Tubieron from becoming the fourth Filipino owner of the title.

On April 11, 2015, Tubieron lost on points against the Englishman from Leeds prospect Josh Warrington once again for the vacant WBC International Featherweight title. In the fifth round, a timekeeping error occurred allowing the round to last full four minutes and sixth round lasted for two minutes. The bout took place at the First Direct Arena, Arena Way, Leeds, United Kingdom.

== Professional boxing record ==
29 fights	19 wins	8 losses
By knockout	8	5
By decision	11	3
Draws	2	

No.	Result	Record	Opponent	Type	Round, Time	Date	Location	Notes
29	Loss	19–8–2	Tae Il Atsumi	KO	2 (8), 2:35	31 Jul 2016	Sumiyoshi Ward Center, Osaka, Japan	
28	Loss	19–7–2	Ryosuke Iwasa	KO	7 (10), 1:42	6 Feb 2016	Korakuen Hall, Tolyo, Japan	
27	Loss	19–6–2	Takafumi Nakajima	UD	8	16 Nov 2015	Korakuen Hall, Tokyo, Japan	
26	Loss	19–5–2	Mitchell Smith	KO	1 (10), 2:42	24 Jul 2015	Wembley Arena, Wembley, England	For WBO Inter-continental super featherweight title
25	Loss	19–4–2	Josh Warrington	UD	12	11 Apr 2015	Leeds Arena, Leeds, England	For vacant WBC International featherweight title
24	Draw	19–3–2	Carlo Magali	MD	12	28 Dec 2014	The Flash Grand Ballroom of the Elorde Sports Complex, Parañaque, Philippines	For vacant WBC International featherweight title
23	Win	19–3–1	Rogelio Jun Doliguez	TD	5 (10)	26 Sep 2014	Mandaluyong Gym, Mandaluyong Sports Center, Mandaluyong, Philippines	
22	Win	18–3–1	Rey Ramos	SD	6	28 Jun 2014	The Flash Grand Ballroom of the Elorde Sports Complex, Parañaque, Philippines	
21	Win	17–3–1	Samuel Apuya	RTD	2 (6), 3:00	15 Mar 2014	Barangay San Dionisio Covered Court, Parañaque, Philippines	
20	Loss	16–3–1	Valentine Borg	TKO	6 (10), 2:46	13 Dec 2013	State Sports Centre, Homebush, New South Wales, Australia	For vacant IBO Asia Pacific lightweight title
19	Win	16–2–1	Rufino Mante	KO	8 (10), 1:20	27 Oct 2013	The Flash Grand Ballroom of the Elorde Sports Complex, Parañaque, Philippines	
18	Loss	15–2–1	Hiroki Shiino	KO	2 (12), 0:29	10 Jun 2013	Korakuen Hall, Tokyo, Japan	For vacant OPBF bantamweight title; Tubieron fails to make weight, title at stake for Shiino only
17	Win	15–1–1	James Mokoginta	TKO	3 (12), 0:50	16 Mar 2013	PAGCOR Grand Theater, Casino Filipino, Parañaque, Philippines	Retained WBC International bantamweight title
16	Win	14–1–1	Hiroki Shiino	TKO	8 (12), 2:31	8 Sep 2012	The Flash Grand Ballroom of the Elorde Sports Complex, Parañaque, Philippines	Won WBC International bantamweight title
15	Win	13–1–1	Rex Olisa	UD	10	11 Mar 2012	Barangay Addition Hills, Mandaluyong, Philippines	
14	Loss	12–1–1	Lubabalo Msuthu	SD	12	19 Nov 2011	Montecasino, Johannesburg, South Africa	For vacant WBF bantamweight title
13	Win	12–0–1	Richard Pumicpic	UD	10	18 Jun 2011	Provincial Capitol, Puerto Princesa, Philippines	
12	Win	11–0–1	Ryan Origenes	TKO	7 (10), 1:27	19 Feb 2011	Imus Plaza Covered Court, Imus, Philippines	Stoppage win for Tubieron after Origenes was declared unfit to continue from a cut below his left eye caused by a punch in round 2
11	Win	10–0–1	Edison Berwela	UD	10	22 Dec 2010	Imus Sports Gymnasium, Imus, Philippines	
10	Draw	9–0–1	Adelino Balongcas	TD	3 (8), 1:58	20 Nov 2010	Imus Plaza Covered Court, Imus, Philippines	Fight stopped due to a cut on Balongcas' eyebrow caused by an accidental headbutt
9	Win	9–0	Rey Liparanon	UD	6	26 Sep 2010	Arayata Sports Complex, Tanza, Philippines	
8	Win	8–0	Allan Ranada	UD	6	7 Aug 2010	Arayata Sports Complex, Tanza, Philippines	
7	Win	7–0	Noel Sungahid	TKO	7 (10), 0:51	26 Jun 2010	Bagumbayan Sports Complex, Bagumbayan, Taguig, Philippines	
6	Win	6–0	Jay Balido	TKO	3 (8), 2:15	31 May 2010	Eastwood City Central Plaza, Barangay Bagumbayan, Quezon City, Philippines	
5	Win	5–0	Jun Piacidad	UD	8	21 Feb 2010	Barangay Libis Espina, Caloocan, Philippines	
4	Win	4–0	Ronnie Pelonia	UD	6	12 Dec 2009	Yñares Sports Arena, Pasig, Philippines	
3	Win	3–0	Arjet Caballes	UD	6	24 Oct 2009	Filinvest Housing Covered Court, Barangay Alabang, Muntinlupa, Philippines	
2	Win	2–0	Ricky Cabatingan	TKO	1 (4), 2:46	19 Aug 2009	LDB Sports Arena, Mangilag Sur, Candelaria, Quezon, Philippines	
1	Win	1–0	Claver Ventolero	UD	4	20 Jun 2009	Muntinlupa Sports Complex, Barangay Tunasan, Muntinlupa, Philippines	
