= Leigh Wood (boxer) =

English boxer (born 1988)

Personal information
- Nickname: Leigh-thal
- Born: 1 August 1988 (age 38) Gedling, Nottinghamshire, England
- Height: 5 ft 7 in (170 cm)
- Weight: Super bantamweight; Featherweight; Super featherweight

Boxing career
- Reach: 67 in (170 cm)
- Stance: Orthodox

Boxing record
- Total fights: 33
- Wins: 29
- Win by KO: 17
- Losses: 4

Leigh Wood is an English professional boxer who has held the World Boxing Association (WBA) featherweight title in 2023, and previously held the Regular versions from 2021 to 2022.

== Professional career ==
=== Early career ===
Wood fought Gavin McDonnell for the British super bantamweight title on 22 February 2014 but lost after the fight was stopped in the 6th round due to Wood being stunned and unable to defend himself. Wood put on an impressive performance and was in control of the fight after winning the first 5 rounds, but prior to the fight Wood had to lose weight for himself to make the weight limit for the fight and after a few rounds Wood was becoming tired. After the loss to McDonnell, Wood had a comeback fight against Martin Mubiru and put in good performance and earned a 3rd-round TKO.

Then after 3 more fights and 3 more wins at featherweight, he stepped up in class to box the man who took his former foe to a draw Josh Wale in a British title eliminator. Wood outboxed Josh Wale for the majority of the fight finishing with last 2 of the 10 rounds with eye catching combinations and powerful right hands, winning the fight unanimously on all 3 scorecards.

Wood's next fight was a redemption fight for the Midlands Area featherweight title against Lee Glover who beat Wood in the Amateurs 7 years prior. Wood came out in the first round pot shooting and making Glover miss before landing some big punches before the bell. The second round went the same way, finally Wood stopping Glover with a big left and perfectly picked flurry of punches, sending Glover to the canvas and not making the count.

Wood faced Abraham Osei Bonsu for the vacant Commonwealth featherweight title on 2 March 2019. He made quick work of Bonsu, winning the fight by a second-round knockout. Wood made his first title defence against the former Commonwealth featherweight champion Ryan Doyle on 10 May 2019. Wood won the fight by a tenth-round knockout. He first staggered Doyle with a left hook and a flurry of punches, before knocking him out with a counter left hook.

Wood challenged the reigning WBO European featherweight champion David Oliver Joyce in The Golden Contract Featherweight Tournament Quarter-final, which was held on 4 October 2019. He won the fight by a ninth-round technical knockout. Wood made his first WBO European title defence against Jazza Dickens in The Golden Contract featherweight tournament semifinals on 21 February 2020. He lost the bout by a narrow majority decision. Two of the judges scored the fight 95–94 and 96–94 for Dickens, while the third judge scored the fight as an even 95–95 draw.

=== WBA (Regular) featherweight champion ===
==== Wood vs. Xu ====
On 6 July 2021, it was announced that Wood would challenge WBA (Regular) featherweight champion Xu Can in Brentwood, Essex on 31 July as part of Matchroom's Fight Camp. Xu came into the fight after 2 years of inactivity. Wood outboxed the champion during periods of the fight, and prevailed with an upset victory via twelfth-round technical knockout. Xu was down on the scorecards at the time of the stoppage, with scores of 105–102, 104–103 and 104–103. Wood landed 222 of his 935 total punches (24%) and 190 of his 477 power punches (40%), compared to Xu's 208 total and 136 power punches.

==== Wood vs. Conlan ====
His first defence of his WBA Regular title came against Michael Conlan on 12 March 2022 at the Motorpoint Arena in Nottingham. Wood was knocked down in the final seconds of the first round, Conlan continued to dominate the fight for the next few rounds, but in the later rounds Wood came back into the fight, with Conlan going down in the 11th round, it was scored as a knockdown despite protests from Conlan's corner that it was a slip. In the 12th round, with Conlan being ahead on all the scorecards, Wood managed to knock out Conlan 1:25 into the round, with Conlan falling through the ropes and being taken to hospital for checks. Conlan said since that he is "all good" and that the scans were "clear". Wood's twelfth-round technical knockout of Conlan was awarded as the winner of both The Ring magazine Fight of the Year 2022 and The Ring magazine Knockout of the Year 2022.

=== WBA featherweight champion ===
==== Wood vs. Lara ====
On 6 April 2022, WBA formally ordered their "Super" champion Leo Santa Cruz to face Wood in a mandatory title defence. They gave the pair 30 days to come to terms and avoid a purse bid. Matchroom Boxing argued for a 50-50 purse split in lieu of the traditional split between a "Super" champion and mandatory title challenger, which would've seen Santa Cruz receive the lion's share of the purse. As such, Santa Cruz's TGB Promotions and Wood's Matchroom Boxing were unable to reach a deal.

On 19 July 2022, the WBA once again ordered their featherweight "Super" champion Leo Santa Cruz to face Wood and gave the champion 24 hours to respond to the order. Santa Cruz requested an exemption from his mandatory defence to face the WBC featherweight champion Rey Vargas instead, which was denied by the sanctioning body. Santa Cruz then offered Wood step-aside money to postpone their fight so he could face Vargas, which was refused by Wood's camp. On 1 August, the WBA notified both camps that a purse bid would be held on 12 August, with a minimum allowed bid of $150,000, with a 75% share going to Santa Cruz as the "Super" titlist. Matchroom Boxing previously submitted an appeal for an even purse split, which was refused by the WBA. They avoided a purse bid, as the two sides reached an agreement to finalise the fight on 12 August. The agreement wasn't to face each other however, but to pursue separate fights. This request was approved by the WBA on 24 August 2022. The same day, it was announced that Wood would make his second WBA (Regular) title defence against Mauricio Lara. The title bout was expected to headline a DAZN broadcast card, which took place at the Motorpoint Arena Nottingham in Nottingham, England, on 24 September 2022. Wood withdrew from the fight ten days before it was supposed to take place, due to a torn biceps suffered in sparring.

On 30 September, the WBA once again ordered Wood and Santa Cruz to enter into negotiations for a title consolidation bout. On 12 December, Santa Cruz vacated his title and Wood was left as the sole champion in the division. As the bout with Santa Cruz fell through, Wood was once again booked to make his first featherweight title defence against Mauricio Lara. The fight took place on 18 February 2023. Wood was knocked down with a left hook near the end of the seventh round. Although he was able to rise from the canvas in time to beat the ten count, his trainer Ben Davison decided to throw in the towel six seconds before the end of the round.

==== Lara vs. Wood II ====
Wood was fought a rematch with Mauricio Lara for the WBA featherweight title in the Manchester Arena, on May 27, 2023. Lara missed weight by 3.8 lbs at the official weigh-ins and was stripped of the belt, leaving only Wood eligible to win the vacant championship. Wood captured the vacant title by unanimous decision, with two scorecards of 118–109 and one scorecard of 116–111.

==== Wood vs. Warrington ====
Wood was ordered by the WBA, on 30 May 2023, to make a mandatory championship defense against the #1 ranked contender Otabek Kholmatov. Exactly two months later however, the sanctioning body approved Wood's request to make a voluntary title defense against the former two-time IBF featherweight champion Josh Warrington, with the stipulation that the winner face Kholmatov within 120 days of their fight taking place. The fight took place on 7 October 2023, at the Utilita Arena Sheffield in Sheffield, England. Wood won the fight by a seventh-round knockout. He was down 58–56, 59–55 and 59–55 on the judges' scorecards at the time of the stoppage. Warrington had furthermore landed nearly twice as many total punches (104 to 53) and power punches (79 to 40) by that point as well. Wood vacated the featherweight championship with immediate effect on October 17, 2023.

==== Wood vs. Cacace ====
After 18 months away from competitive boxing, Wood returned to the ring to challenge IBO super-featherweight champion Anthony Cacace at Nottingham Arena on 10 May 2025, but lost by stoppage in the ninth round.

==== Wood vs. Warrington II ====
Wood faced Josh Warrington in a rematch of their fight from 2023 at Nottingham Arena on 21 February 2026. He won by unanimous decision.

== Professional boxing record ==
33 fights	29 wins	4 losses
By knockout	17	3
By decision	12	1

No.	Result	Record	Opponent	Type	Round, time	Date	Location	Notes
33	Win	29–4	Josh Warrington	UD	12	21 Feb 2026	Nottingham Arena, Nottingham, England	
32	Loss	28–4	Anthony Cacace	TKO	9 (12), 2:15	10 May 2025	Nottingham Arena, Nottingham, England	For IBO super-featherweight title
31	Win	28–3	Josh Warrington	TKO	7 (12), 3:00	7 Oct 2023	Sheffield Arena, Sheffield, England	Retained WBA featherweight title
30	Win	27–3	Mauricio Lara	UD	12	27 May 2023	Manchester Arena, Manchester, England	Won vacant WBA featherweight title
29	Loss	26–3	Mauricio Lara	TKO	7 (12), 2:54	18 Feb 2023	Motorpoint Arena, Nottingham, England	Lost WBA featherweight title
28	Win	26–2	Michael Conlan	TKO	12 (12), 1:25	12 Mar 2022	Motorpoint Arena, Nottingham, England	Retained WBA (Regular) featherweight title
27	Win	25–2	Xu Can	TKO	12 (12), 2:43	31 Jul 2021	Matchroom Headquarters, Brentwood, England	Won WBA (Regular) featherweight title
26	Win	24–2	Reece Mould	TKO	9 (12), 1:03	13 Feb 2021	The SSE Arena, London, England	Won vacant British featherweight title
25	Loss	23–2	Jazza Dickens	MD	10	21 Feb 2020	York Hall, London, England	Lost WBO European featherweight title; The Golden Contract: Featherweight – Semi-final
24	Win	23–1	David Oliver Joyce	TKO	9 (10), 2:23	4 Oct 2019	York Hall, London, England	Won WBO European featherweight title; The Golden Contract: Featherweight – Quarter-final
23	Win	22–1	Ryan Doyle	KO	10 (12), 1:34	10 May 2019	Motorpoint Arena, Nottingham, England	Retained Commonwealth featherweight title
22	Win	21–1	Abraham Osei Bonsu	KO	2 (12), 2:43	2 Mar 2019	East of England Arena, Peterborough, England	Won vacant Commonwealth featherweight title
21	Win	20–1	Rafael Castillo	TKO	3 (6), 1:31	3 Mar 2018	Sheffield Arena, Sheffield, England	
20	Win	19–1	Reynaldo Mora	PTS	6	25 Nov 2017	Harvey Hadden Sports Village, Nottingham, England	
19	Win	18–1	Simas Volosinas	PTS	4	24 Jun 2017	Bingham Leisure Centre, Nottingham, England	
18	Win	17–1	Lee Glover	TKO	2 (10), 1:06	26 Mar 2016	Sheffield Arena, Sheffield, England	Won vacant Midlands Area featherweight title
17	Win	16–1	Josh Wale	PTS	10	24 Oct 2015	Sheffield Arena, Sheffield, England	
16	Win	15–1	Isaac Owusu	KO	4 (6), 0:35	25 Jul 2015	Derby Arena, Derby, England	
15	Win	14–1	Laszio Fekete	TKO	1 (4), 3:00	28 Mar 2015	Sheffield Arena, Sheffield, England	
14	Win	13–1	Janis Puksins	TKO	2 (6), 1:29	7 Mar 2015	Mares Leisure Centre, Nottingham, England	
13	Win	12–1	Martin Mubiru	TKO	3 (8), 1:06	16 May 2014	Rushcliffe Arena, Nottingham, England	
12	Loss	11–1	Gavin McDonnell	TKO	6 (12), 2:03	22 Feb 2014	Ice Arena, Hull, England	For vacant British super-bantamweight title
11	Win	11–0	Simas Volosinas	PTS	4	13 Dec 2013	Ice Sheffield, Sheffield, England	
10	Win	10–0	Genilson de Jesus Santos	RTD	3 (10), 3:00	1 Nov 2013	Clifton Leisure Centre, Nottingham, England	
9	Win	9–0	Ian Bailey	TKO	2 (10), 1:43	22 Jun 2013	Clifton Leisure Centre, Nottingham, England	
8	Win	8–0	Sid Razak	PTS	6	13 Apr 2013	Ponds Forge, Sheffield, England	
7	Win	7–0	Kristian Laight	PTS	4	2 Feb 2013	East of England Arena, Peterborough, England	
6	Win	6–0	Tibor Meszaros	TKO	1 (6), 1:59	8 Dec 2012	KC Sports Arena, Hull, England	
5	Win	5–0	Dai Davies	PTS	4	17 Nov 2012	Capital FM Arena, Nottingham, England	
4	Win	4–0	Chuck Jones	RTD	1 (4), 3:00	28 Sep 2012	Magna Centre, Rotherham, England	
3	Win	3–0	Pavels Senkovs	PTS	4	18 Feb 2012	Magna Centre, Rotherham, England	
2	Win	2–0	Ryan McNicol	PTS	4	12 Nov 2011	Event City, Manchester, England	
1	Win	1–0	Chuck Jones	PTS	6	28 Oct 2011	Clifton Leisure Centre, Nottingham, England	

== See also ==
- List of British world boxing champions
- List of world featherweight boxing champions

Sporting positions
Regional boxing titles
Vacant Title last held by Bobby Jenkinson	BBBofC Midlands Area featherweight champion 26 March 2016 – 2 March 2019; Won Commonwealth title	Vacant Title next held by James Beech Jnr
Vacant Title last held by Jordan Gill	Commonwealth featherweight champion 2 March 2019 – 2021; Vacated	Vacant Title next held by Nathaniel Collins
Preceded by David Oliver Joyce	WBO European featherweight champion 4 October 2019 – 21 February 2020	Succeeded by Jazza Dickens
Vacant Title last held by Ryan Walsh	British featherweight champion 13 February 2021 – 31 July 2021; Won world title	Vacant Title next held by Nathaniel Collins
World boxing titles
Preceded by Xu Can	WBA featherweight champion Regular title 31 July 2021 – 12 December 2022	Title discontinued
Preceded by Léo Santa Cruz as Super champion	WBA featherweight champion 12 December 2022 – 18 February 2023	Succeeded by Mauricio Lara
Vacant Title last held by Mauricio Lara	WBA featherweight champion 27 May 2023 – 17 October 2023; Vacated	Vacant Title next held by Raymond Ford
Awards
Previous: Tyson Fury vs. Deontay Wilder III	The Ring Fight of the Year vs. Michael Conlan; 2022	Succeeded by Luis Nery vs. Azat Hovhannisyan
Previous: Tyson Fury vs. Deontay Wilder III	BWAA Fight of the Year vs. Michael Conlan; 2022	Succeeded by Jaime Munguía vs. Sergiy Derevyanchenko
Previous: Gabriel Rosado; KO3 Bektemir Melikuziev	The Ring Knockout of the Year; TKO12 Michael Conlan; 2022	Next: Junto Nakatani; KO12 Andrew Moloney
