= Allan Ranada =

Filipino boxer

Personal information
- Nickname: Granada
- Nationality: Filipino
- Born: Allan Arapoc Ranada Mutia, Zamboanga del Norte, Philippines
- Height: 5 ft 4 in (163 cm)
- Weight: Light flyweight; Flyweight; Super Flyweight; Bantamweight; Super bantamweight

Boxing career
- Stance: Orthodox

Boxing record
- Total fights: 41
- Wins: 18
- Win by KO: 10
- Losses: 22
- Draws: 1

Allan Ranada is a Filipino professional boxer.

Three times Ranada has fought for regional titles, but has lost in all three attempts. The titles include the WBC Asian Boxing Council flyweight title, the Pan Asian Boxing Association flyweight title, and the WBO Asia Pacific super flyweight title.

Ranada has also fought and lost to Johnriel Casimero, Sonny Boy Jaro, and Dennis Tubieron.

== Professional boxing record ==
41 fights	18 wins	22 losses
By knockout	10	6
By decision	8	16
Draws	1	

No.	Result	Record	Opponent	Type	Round, Time	Date	Location	Notes
41	Loss	18–22–1	Sonny Boy Jaro	TKO	2 (8), 1:52	23 Dec 2011	Angono Sports Complex (Angono Municipal Gym), Barangay Mahabang, Angono, Philippines	
40	Loss	18–21–1	Eduard Penerio	UD	8	5 Nov 2010	Yñares Sports Arena, Pasig City, Philippines	
39	Loss	18–20–1	Dennis Tubieron	UD	6	7 Aug 2010	Arayata Sports Complex, Tanza, Philippines	
38	Loss	18–19–1	Rocky Fuentes	KO	2 (8), 2:25	27 Jun 2009	Mandaue City Plaza Square, Barangay Centro, Mandaue City, Philippines	
37	Loss	18–18–1	John Riel Casimero	UD	8	8 May 2009	Naga City Sports Complex, Naga City, Philippines	
36	Loss	18–17–1	Marvin Tampus	KO	6 (10), 2:19	21 Apr 2008	Lapu-Lapu City Auditorium, Lapu-Lapu City, Philippines	
35	Loss	18–16–1	Richie Mepranum	UD	10	15 Jan 2008	Maasim Municipal Gymnasium, Maasim, Philippines	For PBF flyweight title
34	Loss	18–15–1	Narindech Kokiet Gym	UD	6	23 Oct 2007	Pathum Thani, Thailand	
33	Loss	18–14–1	Fernando Lumacad	KO	2 (10), 1:04	19 Jun 2007	Maasim, Sarangani, Philippines	
32	Win	18–13–1	Jerry Manganip	UD	10	2 Mar 2007	Amphitheater, Cagayan de Oro City, Philippines	
31	Win	17–13–1	Jun Pader	TD	5 (10)	29 Sep 2006	Jagna, Bohol, Philippines	
30	Win	16–13–1	Jojo Rodrigo	TD	6 (10)	8 May 2006	Calape Gymnasium, Calape, Philippines	
29	Win	15–13–1	Rolando Toyogon	TKO	6 (10)	28 Sep 2005	Jagna, Bohol, Philippines	
28	Loss	14–13–1	Takashi Kunishige	TD	9 (10), 1:49	27 Aug 2005	IMP Hall, Osaka, Japan	
27	Loss	14–12–1	Denkaosan Kaovichit	UD	12	17 May 2005	Si Sa Ket, Thailand	For PABA flyweight title
26	Win	14–11–1	Ricky Escaner	TD	4 (10)	11 May 2005	UMYCO Gym, Mambajao, Philippines	
25	Loss	13–11–1	Celso Danggod	TD	7 (10), 1:10	2 Apr 2005	Barangay Alabang, Muntinlupa City, Philippines	For PBF flyweight title
24	Loss	13–10–1	Panomroonglek Kratingdaenggym	KO	7 (12), 2:17	31 Dec 2004	Por Kungpao Restaurant, Bangkok, Thailand	For WBC Asian flyweight title
23	Win	13–9–1	Roger Gadian	UD	10	20 Nov 2004	Kalawit, Zamboanga d Norte, Philippines	
22	Loss	12–9–1	Pichit Chor Siriwat	UD	6	2 Nov 2004	Ubon Ratchathani, Thailand	
21	Loss	12–8–1	Pramuansak Phosuwan	UD	12	20 Sep 2004	Sakon Nakhon, Thailand	For WBO Asia Pacific super flyweight title
20	Win	12–7–1	Roger Gadian	TKO	3 (10)	26 Jul 2004	Ipil, Zamboanga Sibugay, Philippines	
19	Win	11–7–1	Jack Comen	TKO	2 (10), 2:10	25 Jun 2004	Jimenez Municipal Gym, Jimenez, Philippines	
18	Loss	10–7–1	Jito Armando	UD	10	27 Apr 2004	RCTI Studio, Jakarta, Indonesia	
17	Loss	10–6–1	La Syukur	TKO	2 (10)	9 Mar 2004	RCTI Studio, Jakarta, Indonesia	
16	Loss	10–5–1	Marti Polii	UD	10	17 Jan 2004	RCTI Studio, Jakarta, Indonesia	
15	Loss	10–4–1	Anis Ceunfin	UD	10	6 Jan 2004	RCTI Studio, Jakarta, Indonesia	
14	Win	10–3–1	Jhay Herla	TKO	1 (10), 1:20	29 Nov 2003	Jimenez, Misamis Occidental, Philippines	
13	Win	9–3–1	Danilo Logramonte	KO	5 (10)	29 Sep 2003	Jagna Municipal Gym, Jagna, Philippines	
12	Draw	8–3–1	Ernesto Rubillar	TD	7 (10), 0:20	28 Jun 2003	Olivarez College Sports Center, Paranaque City, Philippines	
11	Win	8–3	Decha Kokietgym	KO	3 (6)	21 Feb 2003	Bangbuathong, Thailand	
10	Win	7–3	Roger Maldecir	TKO	3 (10), 2:39	9 Feb 2003	Kidapawan City, Cotabato del Norte, Philippines	
9	Win	6–3	Marvin Gumban	KO	2 (8), 2:37	15 Nov 2002	Surigao City, Surigao del Norte, Philippines	
8	Win	5–3	Kompayak Porpramook	TKO	1 (6)	27 Sep 2002	Uttaradit, Thailand	
7	Loss	4–3	Z Gorres	UD	10	25 May 2002	Mandaue City Sports and Cultural Complex, Barangay Centro, Mandaue City, Philippines	
6	Win	4–2	Julius Agcopra	TKO	5 (10)	13 May 2002	Candijay Gym, Candijay, Philippines	
5	Win	3–2	Jun Morano	UD	6	12 Jan 2002	Jagna Municipal Gym, Jagna, Philippines	
4	Win	2–2	Neil Caga	UD	10	29 Nov 2001	Candijay, Bohol, Philippines	
3	Win	1–2	Edmund Nonong Develleres	UD	6	29 Sep 2001	Jagna, Bohol, Philippines	
2	Loss	0–2	Ricky Escaner	MD	6	21 Aug 2001	Gold City Coliseum, Cagayan de Oro City, Philippines	
1	Loss	0–1	Alex Egina	TD	? (6)	4 May 2001	Hinundayab, Southern Leyte, Philippines	
