= Leigh Wood vs Mauricio Lara =

Professional boxing match

- Date: 18 February 2023
- Venue: Motorpoint Arena, Nottingham, England
- Title(s) on the line: WBA featherweight title

Tale of the tape
Boxer	Leigh Wood	Mauricio Lara
Nickname	Leigh-thal	Bronco
Hometown	Gedling, England	Mexico City, Mexico
Pre-fight record	26–2 (16 KOs)	26–2–1 (19 KOs)
Height	5 ft 7 in (1.70 m)	5 ft 7 in (1.70 m)
Style	Orthodox	Orthodox
Recognition	WBA featherweight champion	

Result
- Lara defeated Wood via round 7 TKO.

Leigh Wood vs Mauricio Lara (billed as “Dance with the Devil”) was a featherweight professional boxing match contested between WBA featherweight champion Leigh Wood and Mauricio Lara. The bout took place on 18 February 2023 at the Motorpoint Arena in Nottingham, England. Lara defeated Wood via technical knockout in the 7th round.

== Background ==
On 24 August 2022 was announced that Leigh Wood would make his second WBA (Regular) title defence against Mexican professional boxer Mauricio Lara at the Motorpoint Arena in Nottingham, England on 24 September 2022. However Wood withdrew from the fight ten days before it was supposed to take place, due to a torn biceps suffered in sparring.

The bout was rescheduled for 18 February 2023 at the Motorpoint Arena in Nottingham, England.

== Fight card ==
Weight class		vs		Method	Round	Time	Notes
Main Card
Featherweight	Mauricio Lara	def.	Leigh Wood (c)	TKO	7/12	2:54	^{Note 1}
Super lightweight	Dalton Smith (c)	def.	Billy Allington	UD	12		^{Note 2}
Lightweight	Gary Cully	def.	Wilfredo Flores	TKO	2/10	1:52	^{Note 3}
Cruiserweight	Cheavon Clarke	def.	Israel Duffus	UD	10
Super bantamweight	Diego Alberto Ruiz	def.	Gamal Yafai	UD	10
Preliminary Card
Super middleweight	Aaron Bowen	def.	Mathieu Gomes	KO	1/6	1:35	^{Note 4}
Super welterweight	Junaid Bostan	def.	Peter Kramer	TKO	7/8	1:30
Super middleweight	Kieron Conway	def.	Jorge Silva	PTS	8
Super lightweight	Sam Maxwell	def.	Shaun Cooper	PTS	6

^Note 1 For WBA featherweight title
^Note 2 For British super-lightweight title
^Note 3 For vacant WBA Inter-Continental lightweight title
^Note 4 Bowen's professional debut

== Rematch ==
During the Anthony Joshua vs Jermaine Franklin broadcast, Eddie Hearn, Mauricio Lara and Leigh Wood appeared in the ring to announce the rematch which took place on 27 May at the AO Arena in Manchester, England.
