= 1970 Rugby League World Cup final =

Great Britain (United Kingdom)	Australia
(RFL)	(ARL)
7	12
	1	2	Total
GBR	4	3	7
AUS	5	7	12
- Date: 7 November 1970
- Stadium: Headingley
- Location: Leeds, England
- Referee: Fred Lindop (Great Britain)
- Attendance: 18,776

Broadcast partners
- Broadcasters: BBC
- Commentators: Eddie Waring

The 1970 Rugby League World Cup final was the conclusive game of the 1970 Rugby League World Cup tournament and was played between Great Britain and Australia on 8 November 1970 at the Headingley ground in Leeds, England.

== Background ==
The 1970 Rugby League World Cup was the fifth staging of the Rugby League World Cup since its inauguration in 1954, and the first since the 1968 tournament. The tournament was held in the England from 21 October, culminating in the final between Great Britain and Australia on 8 November.

=== Great Britain ===
Scores and results list Great Britain's points tally first.

Opposing Team	For	Against	Date	Venue	Attendance	Stage
Australia	11	4	24 October	Headingley, Leeds	15,084	Group stage
France	6	0	28 October	Wheldon Road, Castleford	8,958	Group stage
New Zealand	53	19	31 October	Station Road, Swinton	5,609	Group stage

Great Britain were undefeated going into the final.

=== Australia ===
Scores and results list Great Australia's points tally first.

Opposing Team	For	Against	Date	Venue	Attendance	Stage
New Zealand	47	11	21 October	Central Park, Wigan	9,805	Group stage
Great Britain	4	11	24 October	Headingley, Leeds	15,084	Group stage
France	15	17	1 November	Odsal Stadium, Bradford	6,654	Group stage

Australia, France and New Zealand all finished with one win each. Australia advanced to the Final by virtue of a better for and against record.

== Match details ==
Having retained the Ashes against Australia during their 1970 Australasian tour, Great Britain were favourites to win the World Cup tournament's final.

7 November 1970

Great Britain	7–12	Australia
Tries: John Atkinson Goals: Ray Dutton (1); Field Goal: Syd Hynes		Tries: John Cootes; Lionel Williamson; Goals: Eric Simms (2); Field Goal: Eric Simms

Headingley, Leeds
Attendance: 18,776
Referee: Fred Lindop (Great Britain)

Great Britain	Australia

FB	1	Ray Dutton
RW	2	Alan Smith
RC	3	Syd Hynes
LC	4	Frank Myler (c)
LW	5	John Atkinson
SO	6	Mick Shoebottom
SH	7	Keith Hepworth
PR	8	Dennis Hartley
HK	9	Tony Fisher
PR	10	Cliff Watson
SR	11	Jimmy Thompson
SR	12	Doug Laughton
LF	13	Mal Reilly
Substitutions:
IC	14	Chris Hesketh
IC	15	Bob Haigh
Coach:
(England) Johnny Whiteley

FB	1	Eric Simms
RW	2	Lionel Williamson
RC	3	John Cootes
LC	4	Paul Sait
LW	5	Mark Harris
FE	6	Bob Fulton
HB	7	Billy Smith
PR	8	John O'Neill
HK	9	Ron Turner
PR	10	Bob O'Reilly
SR	11	Bob McCarthy
SR	12	Ron Costello
LK	13	Ron Coote (c)
Substitutions:
IC	14	Ray Branighan
IC	15	Elwyn Walters
Coach:
(Australia) Harry Bath

The match, which would become known as the 'Battle of Headingley' due to its brutality went completely against expectations as Britain failed to play any decent football despite overwhelming possession. The Kangaroos led 5–4 at half-time with a try to Australian three-quarter, Father John Cootes. They went on to utilise their meagre chances to the full, running out 12–7 victors. The game itself was an extended punch-up. The only surprise was that it took 79 minutes before anyone was sent off. Two sacrificial lambs, Billy Smith of Australia and Syd Hynes of Britain, were sent off the field in the last minute for what had been going unpunished throughout the game.

Great Britain, having been undefeated in the World Cup, felt that there should not have been a need to play a final, especially as they had already defeated Australia 11–4 at Headingley in the second game of the tournament.

We beat them at Leeds in the group stages as well as beating France and New Zealand so we were confident but in the final we got our tactics wrong. We tried to physically knock them down but we should have played more football. John Atkinson had that altercation with Father John Cootes after the final whistle. Tactically we didn't play to our best. Maybe there was some complacency due to the Ashes win and the group stage games.

— British loose forward Malcolm Reilly.

(Note: Although Reilly recalls a post-match incident between Atkinson and Cootes, what actually happened was Australian fullback Eric Simms attempted to shake hands with Atkinson after the game, but was instead greeted with a headbutt by the frustrated Lions winger. This led to a wild post-match brawl between the teams that had to be broken up by referee Fred Lindop, his two touch judges, and the Leeds City Police.)
