= Josh Warrington =

English boxer (born 1990)

Personal information
- Nickname: The Leeds Warrior
- Born: 14 November 1990 (age 35) Leeds, England
- Height: 5 ft 7 in (170 cm)
- Weight: Featherweight; Super-featherweight

Boxing career
- Reach: 67 in (170 cm)
- Stance: Orthodox

Boxing record
- Total fights: 38
- Wins: 32
- Win by KO: 8
- Losses: 5
- Draws: 1

Josh Warrington (born 14 November 1990) is an English professional boxer. He is a two-time featherweight world champion, having held the International Boxing Federation (IBF) title twice between 2018 and 2022.

In 2018, a documentary style movie filmed over two years called Fighting for a City premiered. The film follows Warrington during his pursuit of winning the IBF title in his home town at Elland Road Stadium, the home of Leeds United.

== Professional career ==
=== Early career ===
Warrington turned professional in 2009 and won on his professional debut against Wolverhampton's Delroy Spencer (11–89–3) in October before defeating Latvia's Pavels Senkovs (2–10–2), winning both four-round contests by 40–36 points decision.

In 2010, Warrington won all three of his fights, defeating Danny McDermid (0–1), John Riley (0–0) and Youssef Al Hamidi (7–27–2), winning all of his four-round contests by points decision.

By the end of 2011, Warrington maintained his undefeated record with wins over Steve Gethin (11–56–3), Chris Riley (3–3–2), Marc Callaghan (19–21–1), Dougie Curran (5–8–1) and Ian Bailey (7–8), all by points decision.

In the first half of 2012, Warrington defeated Dan Naylor (1–8) and Ibrar Riyaz (4–34–1) by points decision.

In November, Warrington won his first professional title after he defeated the previously unbeaten Dudley-born prospect Chris Male (11–0) by unanimous decision in a ten-round contest to win the vacant English featherweight title. The fight took place at the Venue in Dudley on 9 November.

==== Warrington vs. Speight ====
On 22 March, Warrington made the first defence of his English featherweight title against former Southern Area super featherweight champion Jamie Speight (11–4). He won by unanimous decision over 10 rounds (scorecards of 100–91, 100–91, 100–90) when headlining a show at the Town Hall in Leeds.

==== Warrington vs. Bailey ====
On 27 September, Warrington made the second defence of his English featherweight title after he defeated Southern Area featherweight champion Ian Bailey (9–14) by unanimous decision over 10 rounds. The scorecards read 100–91, 98–92, 100–90 in Warrington's favour. The fight took place at the Banqueting Suite at the Elland Road Stadium in Leeds.

==== Warrington vs. Mouneimne ====
On 2 November, Warrington won the vacant Commonwealth featherweight title after he defeated the previously undefeated Hull-born prospect Samir Mouneimne by 12th-round stoppage in a 12-round contest. The fight took place at the Ice Arena in Hull and was Warrington's first fight on a Matchroom Boxing show.

=== 2014 ===
==== Warrington vs. Munroe ====
In early April, it was announced that Warrington would make the first defence of his Commonwealth featherweight title against former super-bantamweight world title challenger Rendall Munroe (28–4–1) on 19 April. The fight would take place at the Manchester Arena on the undercard to Scott Quigg vs Tshifhiwa Munyai.

Warrington won by technical knockout in the seventh-round after Munroe's corner threw in the towel. Later that month, Munroe announced his retirement from boxing.

==== Warrington vs. Lindsay ====
On 28 April, Matchroom Boxing announced that Warrington would make the second defence of his Commonwealth featherweight title and fight for the vacant British featherweight title against former British champion Martin Lindsay (21–2) at the First Direct Arena in Leeds on 21 May.

Warrington won by unanimous decision over twelve rounds with all three judges scoring the fight 119–110.

Five-fight Matchroom deal

On 27 August, Matchroom Boxing announced that Warrington had signed a five-fight deal with the promotional company. Speaking of the deal, Warrington said: "It’s great to have signed the deal so that I know that there’s going to be more big nights in Leeds in the next year."

Promoter Eddie Hearn said: "Josh is the biggest ticket seller in the country right now, and we have an opportunity to do something very big in Leeds. We dipped our toe in the water in May and now we’re diving in headfirst. It’s a huge opportunity for Josh and I think we could see one of the most memorable atmosphere in a British arena for some time."

==== Warrington vs. Dieli ====
On 4 October, Warrington won the vacant EBU European featherweight title after he defeated Italy's Davide Dieli (15–3) by fourth-round stoppage in a twelve-round contest. The fight took place at the First Direct Arena in Leeds.

=== 2015–2017 ===
==== Warrington vs. Tellez ====
On 15 December, Matchroom Boxing announced that Warrington would fight on the undercard to Arthur Abraham vs Paul Smith in Berlin on 21 February, his first fight of the year.

Later it was confirmed that Warrington would fight Nicaragua's Edwin Tellez (9–11–5) in an eight-round contest.

Prior to the fight, Warrington told the Yorkshire Evening Post: "Even though he's not got an excellent record, he's a fighter that I cannot take lightly."

Warrington won by fifth-round stoppage

==== Warrington vs. Tubieron ====
On 7 January, Matchroom Boxing announced that Warrington would fight Philippines' Dennis Tubieron (19–3–2) in a WBC world title eliminator and for the vacant WBC International featherweight title. The fight would headline a show at the First Direct Arena in Leeds on 11 April.

Warrington was accompanied by former Leeds United footballer Vinnie Jones during his ringwalk.

Warrington won by unanimous decision over twelve rounds, with all three judges scoring the fight 119–109.

After the fight, he admitted that he wasn't at his best, telling Sky Sports: "Looking back, I don’t think it was my best performance, but it’s all about learning. Maybe if I’d listened to my instructions a little bit more, I’d have got him out of there, but it’s all about experience. I can take so much from that fight."

Later that month, Warrington vacated his EBU European featherweight title after suffering a slight injury.

==== Warrington vs. Brunker ====
On 22 June, Matchroom Boxing announced that Warrington would defend his WBC International and Commonwealth featherweight titles against Australia's Joel Brunker (28–1) at the First Direct Arena in Leeds on 5 September.

Warrington won by unanimous decision over twelve rounds, with all three judges scoring the fight 120–108.

==== Warrington vs. Amagasa ====
On 15 February, Matchroom Boxing announced that Warrington would make the second defence of his WBC International featherweight title against Japan's Hisashi Amagasa (30–5–2), a former world title challenger at super-bantamweight. The fight would headline the show at the First Direct Arena in Leeds on 16 April.

Promoter Eddie Hearn said of the fight: "Josh is hunting a summer clash with IBF champion Lee Selby, so he cannot afford any slip-ups against Japanese banger Amagasa."

Warrington won by unanimous decision over twelve rounds, with the scorecards reading 117–111, 118–111 and 120–107.

==== Warrington vs. Hyland ====
On 14 June, Matchroom Boxing announced that Warrington would make the third defence of his WBC International featherweight title against Patrick Hyland (31–2), headlining a show at the First Direct Arena in Leeds on 30 July.

The WBC International featherweight title wasn't on the line for Hyland as he came in 2lbs and 6oz over weight at the weigh-in.

Warrington won by ninth-round technical knockout after he knocked Hyland down once in round eight and again round nine.

==== Leaving Matchroom and joining Frank Warren ====
On 2 December 2016, Matchroom Boxing announced that Warrington's promotional contract with them had expired. Warrington's promoter and Matchroom managing director Eddie Hearn said in a statement "we did not share the same plans as his team and decided not to make any further offers."

After much speculation, Warrington officially signed for rival British promoter Frank Warren in a "long-term promotional deal" later in December. Warren said he was confident of delivering a first world title shot for Warrington as well as a number of shows in Leeds in 2017.

==== Warrington vs. Martinez ====
In February, Warren announced that Warrington would be making his return to the ring on 13 May at the First Direct Arena in Leeds. It was initially announced that Warrington would fight WBO Inter-Continental champion Marco McCullough. However, it was since announced that Warrington would not fight McCullough and would instead fight former IBF super-bantamweight world champion Kiko Martinez (36–7–1).

Warrington defeated Martinez by a majority decision over 12 rounds, with scorecards of 116–112 (twice) and 114–114, in the third defence of his WBC International title.

==== Warrington vs. Ceylan ====
In August, it was announced that Warrington would fight the undefeated EBU European champion Dennis Ceylan (18–0–2) in an IBF world title final eliminator, to the title held by champion Lee Selby, at the First Direct Arena in Leeds on 21 October.

Commenting on the fight, Warrington said: "With Selby not taking a fight with me, it’s left me annoyed and even more hungry to produce a massive performance on October 21."

Warrington defeated Ceylan by tenth-round technical knockout after twice knocking down Ceylan in the same round.

Speaking of Lee Selby, Warrington told BT Sport in his post-fight interview that: "I want to get the Welshman up here. If we can make it at Elland Road, let's have it. I've waited so long and now I'm there."

=== 2018 ===
==== Warrington vs. Selby ====
On 23 January, it was confirmed that Warrington would fight IBF world champion Lee Selby (26–1) in his first world title fight on 19 May. On 30 January Elland Road Stadium was confirmed as the venue for the fight.

Warrington commented on the fight: "By winning this fight, not only do I get my hands on a world title, but it’s a chance to show everyone that I’m the best featherweight in the UK and propel myself onto the world level." Warrington was accompanied to the ring by ex Leeds United player Lucas Radebe whilst band Kaiser Chiefs performed live.

Warrington secured a split-decision victory over Selby by thoroughly outworking him for the majority of the twelve rounds to claim the title, and hand Selby his second career loss.

==== Warrington vs. Frampton ====
Immediately after Carl Frampton's win over Luke Jackson, Frank Warren announced that he would challenge Warrington for the IBF title. Warrington was also in attendance and entered the ring. Warren announced the fight would take place in December 2018 and be shown live and exclusive on BT Sport Box Office, BT's new pay-per-view platform. On 28 August, Boxing Scene reported a press conference would take place in the coming weeks with the fight likely to take place at the Manchester Arena. Warren wanted the fight to take place in a stadium, however did not want any mandatories to get in the way as a stadium fight would likely take place in Spring 2019. On 15 September, the fight was officially announced to take place at the Manchester Arena on 22 December 2018. Warrington weighed 125.6 pounds and Frampton came in slightly heavier at 125.9 pounds, both successfully making the featherweight limit. Warrington won the fight by unanimous decision. The judges scored the fight 116–112, 116–112 and 116–113 in his favour.

=== 2019–2021 ===
==== Warrington vs. Takoucht ====
On 7 August 2019, it was confirmed that Warrington would defend the IBF featherweight championship for the third time against Sofiane Takoucht. The fight took place on 12 October 2019, at the First Direct Arena in Leeds, England. This was the 13th time Warrington fought as a professional in his hometown of Leeds. In a one sided fight Warrington beat Takoucht by TKO in the second round.

==== Warrington vs. Galahad ====
On 15 June 2019, Warrington had his second title defense against domestic rival and IBF #1 contender Kid Galahad in his hometown of Leeds. In a messy bout, with a lot of holding and clinching from both sides, Warrington proved to be the aggressor more often than his counterpart, which was sufficient to edge the victory and retail his world title. The scorecards read 116–113 and 116–112 in favor of Warrington, while the third judge scored the fight 115–113 for Galahad.

==== Warrington vs. Lara ====
Warrington faced Mauricio Lara, a relatively unknown 22-year-old Mexican prospect, on 13 February 2021 after over a year of inactivity. No title was on the line as Warrington had vacated his IBF featherweight title a month prior. Warrington started off the fight slower than usual, and in the fourth round, he was hurt by a left hook before ultimately being knocked down. Despite getting up, Warrington never regained his legs, though he was able to land a few effective combinations on Lara in the subsequent rounds. In the ninth round, Lara once again knocked Warrington down with a left hook, and the fight was immediately called off by the referee, handing Warrington his first career loss. Lara's victory was considered a major upset, as he had been rated as an 11/1 (+1100) pre-fight underdog, compared to Warrington having been rated as the 1/33 (-3300) betting favourite. The Ring magazine opined that the result was an early candidate for its Upset of the Year award.

==== Warrington vs. Lara II ====
It was announced on 14 July 2021 that Warrington and Lara would face each other in a rematch on 4 September 2021 at Emerald Headingley Stadium in the former's hometown of Leeds. The fight ended in a technical draw after two rounds, after Lara was badly cut above his left eye due to a head clash.

=== 2022 ===
==== Warrington vs. Martínez ====
Warrington regained the IBF featherweight title by stopping defending champion Kiko Martínez in the seventh round at First Direct Arena in Leeds on 26 March 2022.

==== Warrington vs. Lopez ====
Once again at the First Direct Arena in Leeds, Warrington made the first defense of his newly reclaimed title against Luis Alberto Lopez on 10 December. He lost by majority decision with two of the judges scoring the fight 115–113 for his opponent, while the third ruled it a 114–114 draw.

=== 2023–2026 ===
==== Warrington vs. Wood ====
After 10 months out of competitive action, Warrington challenged WBA featherweight champion Leigh Wood at the Utilita Arena in Sheffield on 7 October 2023. He had appeared to be dominating the bout until being knocked to the canvas by a flurry of punches in the seventh round. Warrington got to his feet but the referee decided he was not fit to continue and waved the fight off.

==== Warrington vs. Cacace ====
Following another lengthy break, this time 11 months, Warrington returned to the ring on 21 September 2024, with IBO super-featherweight champion Anthony Cacace in the opposite corner at Wembley Stadium in London. He lost by unanimous decision.

==== Warrington vs. Khan ====
Warrington snapped his three-fight losing streak on 25 April 2025 with a unanimous decision win over Asad Asif Khan in a 10 round contest at Park Community Arena in Sheffield.

==== Warrington vs. Wood II ====
Warrington faced Leigh Wood in a rematch of their fight from 2023 at Nottingham Arena on 21 February 2026. He lost by unanimous decision.

== Professional boxing record ==
38 fights	32 wins	5 losses
By knockout	8	2
By decision	24	3
Draws	1	

No.	Result	Record	Opponent	Type	Round, time	Date	Location	Notes
38	Loss	32–5–1	Leigh Wood	UD	12	21 Feb 2026	Nottingham Arena, Nottingham, England	
37	Win	32–4–1	Asad Asif Khan	UD	10	25 Apr 2025	Park Community Arena, Sheffield	
36	Loss	31–4–1	Anthony Cacace	UD	12	21 Sep 2024	Wembley Stadium, London, England	For IBO super-featherweight title
35	Loss	31–3–1	Leigh Wood	TKO	7 (12), 3:00	7 Oct 2023	Utilita Arena Sheffield, Sheffield, England	For WBA featherweight title
34	Loss	31–2–1	Luis Alberto Lopez	MD	12	10 Dec 2022	First Direct Arena, Leeds, England	Lost IBF featherweight title
33	Win	31–1–1	Kiko Martínez	TKO	7 (12), 2:12	26 Mar 2022	First Direct Arena, Leeds, England	Won IBF featherweight title
32	Draw	30–1–1	Mauricio Lara	TD	2 (12), 3:00	4 Sep 2021	Headingley Stadium, Leeds, England	Fight stopped after Lara cut from an accidental head clash
31	Loss	30–1	Mauricio Lara	TKO	9 (12), 0:54	13 Feb 2021	Wembley Arena, London, England	
30	Win	30–0	Sofiane Takoucht	TKO	2 (12), 2:54	12 Oct 2019	First Direct Arena, Leeds, England	Retained IBF featherweight title
29	Win	29–0	Kid Galahad	SD	12	15 Jun 2019	First Direct Arena, Leeds, England	Retained IBF featherweight title
28	Win	28–0	Carl Frampton	UD	12	22 Dec 2018	Manchester Arena, Manchester, England	Retained IBF featherweight title
27	Win	27–0	Lee Selby	SD	12	19 May 2018	Elland Road, Leeds, England	Won IBF featherweight title
26	Win	26–0	Dennis Ceylan	TKO	10 (12), 1:43	21 Oct 2017	First Direct Arena, Leeds, England	
25	Win	25–0	Kiko Martínez	MD	12	13 May 2017	First Direct Arena, Leeds, England	Retained WBC International featherweight title
24	Win	24–0	Patrick Hyland	TKO	9 (12), 0:45	30 Jul 2016	First Direct Arena, Leeds, England	
23	Win	23–0	Hisashi Amagasa	UD	12	16 Apr 2016	First Direct Arena, Leeds, England	Retained WBC International featherweight title
22	Win	22–0	Joel Brunker	UD	12	5 Sep 2015	First Direct Arena, Leeds, England	Retained WBC International and Commonwealth featherweight titles
21	Win	21–0	Dennis Tubieron	UD	12	11 Apr 2015	First Direct Arena, Leeds, England	Won vacant WBC International featherweight title
20	Win	20–0	Edwin Tellez	TKO	5 (8), 1:51	21 Feb 2015	Mercedes-Benz Arena, Berlin, Germany	
19	Win	19–0	Davide Dieli	TKO	4 (12), 1:42	4 Oct 2014	First Direct Arena, Leeds, England	Won vacant European featherweight title
18	Win	18–0	Martin Lindsay	UD	12	21 May 2014	First Direct Arena, Leeds, England	Retained Commonwealth featherweight title; Won British featherweight title
17	Win	17–0	Rendall Munroe	RTD	7 (12), 3:00	19 Apr 2014	Manchester Arena, Manchester, England	Retained Commonwealth featherweight title
16	Win	16–0	Samir Mouneimne	TKO	12 (12), 1:27	2 Nov 2013	Hull Ice Arena, Hull, England	Won vacant Commonwealth featherweight title
15	Win	15–0	Ian Bailey	UD	10	27 Sep 2013	Elland Road, Leeds, England	Retained English featherweight title
14	Win	14–0	Jamie Speight	UD	10	22 Mar 2013	Town Hall, Leeds, England	Retained English featherweight title
13	Win	13–0	Chris Male	UD	10	9 Nov 2012	The Venue, Dudley, England	Won vacant English featherweight title
12	Win	12–0	Ibrar Riyaz	PTS	4	2 Jun 2012	Bowlers Exhibition Centre, Manchester, England	
11	Win	11–0	Dan Naylor	PTS	6	3 Mar 2012	Hillsborough Leisure Centre, Sheffield, England	
10	Win	10–0	Ian Bailey	PTS	4	18 Dec 2011	De Vere Whites Hotel, Bolton, England	
9	Win	9–0	Dougie Curran	PTS	6	22 Oct 2011	De Vere Whites, Bolton, England	
8	Win	8–0	Marc Callaghan	PTS	6	28 Apr 2011	City Hall, Hull, England	
7	Win	7–0	Chris Riley	PTS	6	9 Apr 2011	Rainton Meadows Arena, Houghton-le-Spring	
6	Win	6–0	Steve Gethin	PTS	4	22 Jan 2011	Doncaster Dome, Doncaster, England	
5	Win	5–0	Youssef al-Hamidi	PTS	4	2 Oct 2010	Elland Road, Leeds, England	
4	Win	4–0	John Riley	PTS	4	28 May 2010	Leisure Centre, Huddersfield, England	
3	Win	3–0	Danny McDermid	PTS	4	5 Mar 2010	Leisure Centre, Huddersfield, England	
2	Win	2–0	Pavels Senkovs	PTS	4	20 Dec 2009	De Vere Whites Hotel, Bolton, England	
1	Win	1–0	Delroy Spencer	PTS	4	31 Oct 2009	Leisure Centre, Huddersfield, England	

== Team ==
Warrington was signed to Eddie Hearn's Matchroom Boxing in the early stages of his career. He split from Matchroom to join Frank Warren's Queensberry Promotions in 2016, before rejoining Matchroom in February 2020. He is trained by his father, Sean O'Hagan. He is managed by Steve Wood, from VIP Boxing, who also manages former WBO lightweight world champion Terry Flanagan.

== Personal life ==
Warrington and his wife Natasha have twin daughters. He was excluded from John Smeaton Academy and didn't achieve the grades he needed to continue his education. He re-sat his exams on the advice of his father, Sean O'Hagan. He subsequently attended University of Leeds and gained a degree in 2013.

== See also ==
- List of British world boxing champions
- List of world featherweight boxing champions

Sporting positions
Regional boxing titles
Vacant Title last held by Derry Mathews	English featherweight champion 9 November 2012 – October 2013; Vacated	Vacant Title next held by Isaac Lowe
Vacant Title last held by Lee Selby	Commonwealth featherweight champion 2 November 2013 – 2015	Vacant Title next held by Isaac Lowe
Vacant Title last held by Lee Selby	British featherweight champion 21 May 2014 – 2014	Vacant Title next held by Ryan Walsh
Vacant Title last held by Lee Selby	European featherweight champion 4 October 2014 – 2015	Vacant Title next held by Oleg Yefimovych
Vacant Title last held by Lee Selby	WBC International featherweight champion 11 April 2015 – October 2017	Vacant Title next held by Lerato Dlamini
World boxing titles
Preceded by Lee Selby	IBF featherweight champion 19 May 2018 – 21 January 2021; Vacated	Vacant Title next held by Kid Galahad
Preceded by Kiko Martínez	IBF featherweight champion 26 March 2022 – 10 December 2022	Succeeded by Luis Alberto Lopez
