= Mauricio Lara =

Mexican boxer (born 1998)

Personal information
- Nickname: Bronco
- Born: Mauricio Lara Acosta; 23 February 1998 (age 28) Mexico City, Mexico
- Height: 5 ft 7 in (170 cm)
- Weight: Featherweight; Super featherweight

Boxing career
- Reach: 67 in (170 cm)
- Stance: Orthodox

Boxing record
- Total fights: 36
- Wins: 31
- Win by KO: 24
- Losses: 3
- Draws: 2

Mauricio Lara Acosta (born 23 February 1998) is a Mexican professional boxer. He held the WBA featherweight title in 2023.

== Professional career ==
=== Lara vs. Warrington ===
In his toughest test to date, Lara faced undefeated former IBF featherweight champion Josh Warrington on 13 February 2021 at the SSE Arena in London. No title was on the line as Warrington had vacated his IBF featherweight title a month prior.

Warrington had started off the fight slower than usual, and in the fourth round, Lara hurt him with a left hook before knocking his opponent down. Despite getting up, Warrington never regained his legs, though he was able to land a few effective combinations on Lara in the subsequent rounds. In the ninth round, Lara once again knocked his opponent down with a left hook, and the fight was immediately called off by the referee, handing Warrington his first career loss, breaking Warrington's 30-0 unbeaten streak. Lara's victory was considered a major upset, as he had been rated as an 11/1 (+1100) pre-fight underdog, compared to Warrington having been rated as the 1/33 (-3300) betting favorite. The Ring magazine opined that the result was an early candidate for its Upset of the Year award.

=== Lara vs. Warrington II ===
It was announced on 14 July 2021 that Lara and Warrington would face each other in a rematch on 4 September at Headingley Stadium in Warrington's hometown of Leeds, England. Lara expressed excitement about the prospect of potentially handing Warrington another defeat, saying, "I've never been much of a talker, I'd rather do my talking in the ring. I'm going for a repeat performance on September 4. Hit once, hit twice. Warrington should know that I am coming for him. This is all about pride. This is for Mexico!" The fight ended in a technical draw after 2 rounds, after Lara was badly cut above his left eye due to a head clash.

=== Lara vs. Wood ===
On 24 August 2022 was announced that Leigh Wood would make his second WBA (Regular) title defence against Lara. The title bout was expected to headline a DAZN broadcast card, which would have taken place at the Motorpoint Arena Nottingham in Nottingham, England on 24 September 2022. However Leigh Wood withdrew from the fight ten days before it was supposed to take place, due to a torn biceps suffered in sparring.

Lara was once again booked for WBA featherweight title fight against Leigh Wood. The fight took place on 18 February 2023. Mauricio Lara knocked down the champion with a left hook near the end of the seventh round, and Wood's trainer decided to throw in the towel. Lara became WBA featherweight champion.

=== Lara vs. Wood II ===
Lara was expected to defend the WBA featherweight title against Wood in the Manchester Arena, on 27 May 2023. Lara missed weight by 3.8 lbs at the official weigh-ins and was stripped of the belt, leaving only Wood eligible to win the vacant championship. On 27 May, Lara lost to Wood via unanimous decision, with two scorecards of 118–109 and one scorecard of 116–111.

=== Lara vs. Lugo ===
On 16 February 2024 in Oaxaca, Mexico, Lara was scheduled to face Daniel Lugo in a 10-round bout at featherweight. The fight ended in a majority draw.

=== Lara vs. Davila ===
Lara is scheduled to face Edwing Davila in a 10-round super featherweight bout in Mexico City, Mexico on 31 January 2025.

== Professional boxing record ==
36 fights	31 wins	3 losses
By knockout	24	1
By decision	7	2
Draws	2	

No.	Result	Record	Opponent	Type	Round, time	Date	Location	Notes
36	Win	31–3–2	Carlos Ornelas	TKO	2 (10), 0:47	29 August 2026	Complejo Deportivo de Artes Marciales, Guadalajara, Mexico	
35	Win	30–3–2	Rafael Rosas Ramirez	TKO	2 (10), 2:51	7 March 2026	Explanada del Palacio Municipal, Ciudad Nezahualcóyotl, Mexico	
34	Win	29–3–2	Miguel Román	TKO	1 (10), 2:05	18 October 2025	Gimnasio Universitario de la Universidad Autónoma de Ciudad Juárez, Ciudad Juárez, Mexico	
33	Win	28–3–2	Edwing Davila	TKO	8 (10), 1:32	31 January 2025	Centro de Espectáculos del Recinto Ferial, Metepec, Mexico	
32	Win	27–3–2	Pedro Delgado	TKO	7 (10), 1:07	30 August 2024	Pepsi Center WTC, Mexico City, Mexico	
31	Draw	26–3–2	Daniel Lugo	MD	10	16 February 2024	Auditorio Guelaguetza, Oaxaca City, Mexico	
30	Loss	26–3–1	Leigh Wood	UD	12	27 May 2023	Manchester Arena, Manchester, England	WBA featherweight title at stake; only for Wood as Lara missed weight
29	Win	26–2–1	Leigh Wood	TKO	7 (12), 2:54	18 February 2023	Motorpoint Arena, Nottingham, England	Won WBA featherweight title
28	Win	25–2–1	José Sanmartin	TKO	3 (10), 1:36	22 October 2022	Plaza de Toros México, Mexico City, Mexico	
27	Win	24–2–1	Emilio Sanchez	KO	3 (10), 2:59	5 March 2022	Pechanga Arena, San Diego, California, U.S.	
26	Draw	23–2–1	Josh Warrington	TD	2 (12), 3:00	4 September 2021	Headingley Stadium, Leeds, England	Fight stopped after Lara was cut from an accidental head clash
25	Win	23–2	Josh Warrington	TKO	9 (12), 0:54	13 February 2021	Wembley Arena, London, England	
24	Win	22–2	Sergio Puente	UD	10	4 December 2020	Las Lomas, Monterrey, Mexico	
23	Win	21–2	Jesus Quijada	TKO	8 (10), 1:19	21 August 2020	Restaurante Ballpark, Hermosillo, Mexico	
22	Win	20–2	Alejandro Palmero	TKO	1 (10), 2:54	4 July 2020	Gimnasio TV Azteca, Mexico City, Mexico	
21	Win	19–2	Alejandro Palmero	TKO	4 (8), 1:27	1 February 2020	Jardín Cerveza Expo, Guadalupe, Mexico	
20	Win	18–2	Rafael Sanchez Rodriguez	KO	4 (8), 1:07	7 December 2019	Auditorio GNP, Puebla, Mexico	
19	Win	17–2	Eduardo Estela	TKO	8 (10),	28 September 2019	Club Ferrocarril de Concordia, Concordia, Argentina	
18	Win	16–2	Oscar Barajas	RTD	5 (8), 3:00	6 July 2019	Delegación Coyoacán, Mexico City, Mexico	
17	Win	15–2	Guillermo Avila	TKO	2 (8), 2:44	23 March 2019	Centro de Espectáculos del Recinto Ferial, Metepec, Mexico	
16	Win	14–2	Jose Calyecac	UD	8	12 January 2019	Deportivo Trabajadores del Metro, Mexico City, Mexico	
15	Win	13–2	Alberto Luna Galicia	TKO	6 (8), 2:37	17 November 2018	Arena México, Mexico City, Mexico	
14	Win	12–2	Sergio Alfredo Chirino Sanchez	RTD	2 (8), 3:00	25 August 2018	Domo Sindicato de Trabajadores IMSS, Mexico City, Mexico	
13	Loss	11–2	Eliot Chávez	KO	1 (6), 0:50	19 May 2018	Hotel Holiday Inn, Victoria de Durango, Mexico	
12	Win	11–1	Daniel Colula	TKO	1 (6), 1:04	10 March 2018	Domo Sindicato de Trabajadores IMSS, Mexico City, Mexico	
11	Win	10–1	Israel Robles	UD	6	20 January 2018	Domo Sindicato de Trabajadores IMSS, Mexico City, Mexico	
10	Win	9–1	Luis Gerardo Perez Salas	KO	1 (6), 1:22	25 November 2017	Domo Sindicato de Trabajadores IMSS, Mexico City, Mexico	
9	Win	8–1	Erick Andrés Cruz	TKO	4 (6), 1:22	8 July 2017	Centro de Convenciones IMSS, Mexico City, Mexico	
8	Win	7–1	Eduardo Baez	UD	6	1 April 2017	Auditorio Fausto Gutierrez Moreno, Tijuana, Mexico	
7	Win	6–1	Martin Jimenez Delgado	UD	4	21 January 2017	Deportivo Benito Juárez, Mexico City, Mexico	
6	Win	5–1	Israel Rodriguez Picazo	SD	4	14 December 2016	Ciudad Deportiva Magdalena Mixhuca, Mexico City, Mexico	
5	Win	4–1	Julio Cesar Olvera Rodriguez	TKO	2 (4), 2:06	26 November 2016	Unidad Deportiva Miguel Hidalgo, Morelia, Mexico	
4	Win	3–1	Joel Cordova	TKO	4 (4), 1:48	5 November 2016	Fronton El Momo, Mexico City, Mexico	
3	Win	2–1	Daniel Carrillo	TKO	2 (4), 0:32	17 September 2016	Unidad Deportiva Miguel Hidalgo, Morelia, Mexico	
2	Win	1–1	Rogelio Perez Marquez	UD	4	8 July 2016	Auditorio BB, Mexico City, Mexico	
1	Loss	0–1	Julio Carabino	SD	4	10 October 2015	Explanada Delegacional Milpa Alta, Milpa Alta, Mexico	

== See also ==
- List of Mexican boxing world champions
- List of world featherweight boxing champions
- List of WBA world champions

Sporting positions
World boxing titles
Preceded by Leigh Wood	WBA featherweight champion 18 February 2023 – 26 May 2023; Stripped	Vacant Title next held by Leigh Wood
