= Joel Brunker =

Australian boxer

Personal information
- Nickname: Aussie
- Nationality: Australia
- Born: Joel Brunker; 22 February 1986 (age 40) Richmond, Sydney
- Height: 1.71 m (5 ft 7 1/2 in)
- Weight: Featherweight

Boxing career
- Stance: Orthodox

Boxing record
- Total fights: 34
- Wins: 30
- Win by KO: 20
- Losses: 4

Joel Brunker (born 22 February 1986 in Richmond, New South Wales) is a former featherweight boxer from Australia. He competed at the 2004 Summer Olympics in Athens, Greece. He was eliminated in the first round of the men's bantamweight division (– 54 kg) by eventual bronze medalist Aghasi Mammadov.

He was an Australian Institute of Sport scholarship holder.

== Professional boxing record ==
30 Wins (20 knockouts, 10 decisions), 4 Losses, 0 Draws
Res.	Record	Opponent	Type	Rd., Time	Date	Location	Notes
Win	31–2	(Indonesia) Jason Butar Butar	TKO	2,6	2017-03-17	The Melbourne Pavilion, Flemington, Victoria, Australia	
Win	30–2	(Thailand) Decha Janthasri	KO	1,6	2016-10-30	Club Punchbowl, Sydney, New South Wales, Australia	
Win	29–2	(Thailand) Phum Kunmat	UD	6	2016-08-13	The Melbourne Pavilion, Flemington, Victoria, Australia	
Loss	28–2	(United Kingdom) Josh Warrington	UD	12	2015-09-05	(United Kingdom) First Direct Arena, Leeds, Yorkshire, England	For Commonwealth & WBC International Featherweight title.
Win	28–1	(Philippines) Rey Las Pinas	TKO	2 (12)	2015-02-14	(Australia) Richmond Park, Richmond, New South Wales	Won IBO Oceania Featherweight title.
Loss	27–1	(United Kingdom) Lee Selby	TKO	9 (12)	2014-10-11	(United Kingdom) Millennium Dome, London, England	IBF Featherweight title eliminator.
Win	27–0	(United States) Mike Oliver	UD	8	2013-08-17	Revel Resort Atlantic City, Atlantic City, New Jersey, United States	
Win	26–0	(Thailand) Maxsaisai Sithsaithong	KO	4 (10)	2013-05-17	Richmond Club, Richmond, New South Wales, Australia	
Win	25–0	(Mexico) Ivan Hernández	UD	8	2013-01-30	Sydney Entertainment Centre, Sydney, New South Wales, Australia	
Win	24–0	(Dominican Republic) Carlos Fulgencio	KO	1 (8)	2012-10-27	Turning Stone Resort & Casino, Verona, New York, United States	
Win	23–0	(Mexico) Edgar Riovalle	UD	8	2012-07-13	Orion Function Centre, Campsie, New South Wales, Australia	
Win	22–0	(Australia) Matt Powell	UD	8	2012-03-02	Mansfield Tavern, Mansfield, Queensland, Australia	
Win	21–0	(Philippines) Adones Aguelo	UD	12	2011-11-25	Richmond Club, Richmond, New South Wales, Australia	Interim WBO Oriental featherweight title.
Win	20–0	(Philippines) Reynaldo Belandres	UD	8	2011-08-31	Derwent Entertainment Centre, Hobart, Australia	
Win	19–0	(Philippines) Freddie Martinez	KO	4 (10)	2011-07-22	Richmond Club, Richmond, New South Wales, Australia	
Win	18–0	(Indonesia) Marangin Marbun	RTD	4 (12)	2011-03-18	Richmond Club, Richmond, New South Wales, Australia	Interim WBO Oriental featherweight title
Win	17–0	(Philippines) Roberto Lerio	TKO	8 (10)	2010-11-25	The Cube (Campbelltown Convention Centre), Campbelltown, New South Wales, Australia	
Win	16–0	(Indonesia) Carlos Lopez	KO	2 (10)	2010-09-02	Le Montage, Lilyfield, New South Wales, Australia	Vacant WBO Youth featherweight title.
Win	15–0	(Australia) Ernie Gonzales Jr	TKO	7 (10)	2010-06-18	Richmond Club, Richmond, New South Wales, Australia	Australian featherweight title.
Win	14–0	(Australia) Dianever Orcales	TD	9 (10)	2010-04-16	Tattersalls Club, Brisbane, Queensland, Australia	Australian featherweight title.
Win	13–0	(New Zealand) Manu Emery	TKO	5 (8)	2010-03-05	Richmond Club, Richmond, New South Wales, Australia	
Win	12–0	(Thailand) Kongfah Singwancha	TKO	3 (4)	2009-12-11	Roundhouse (University of NSW), Kensington, New South Wales, Australia	
Win	11–0	(Thailand) Mongkolchai Patavikorngym	KO	1 (8)	2009-10-30	Richmond Club, Richmond, New South Wales, Australia	
Win	10–0	(Australia) Ernie Gonzales Jr	UD	10	2009-08-14	Blacktown RSL Club, Blacktown, New South Wales, Australia	Vacant Australian featherweight title.
Win	9–0	(Philippines) Roel Mangan	MD	6	2009-07-17	Richmond Club, Richmond, New South Wales, Australia	
Win	8–0	(Philippines) Flash Villacura	UD	6	2009-06-12	Brisbane Broncos Leagues Club, Brisbane, Queensland, Australia	
Win	7–0	(Australia) Kartu Arang	KO	3 (6)	2009-04-25	PCYC, Gladstone, Queensland, Australia	
Win	6–0	(Philippines) Percy Samson	TKO	4 (6)	2009-04-17	Richmond Club, Richmond, New South Wales, Australia	
Win	5–0	(Australia) Dan Cody	KO	5 (6)	2009-03-13	Mansfield Tavern, Mansfield, Queensland, Australia	
Win	4–0	(Australia) Troy Glover	TKO	2 (4)	2009-02-20	Newcastle Panthers Club, Newcastle, New South Wales, Australia	
Win	3–0	(Australia) Kane Buckley	UD	4	2009-04-17	The Cube (Campbelltown Convention Centre), Campbelltown, New South Wales, Australia	
Win	2–0	(Australia) Steve Storic	TKO	3 (4)	2008-11-21	Blacktown RSL Club, Blacktown, New South Wales, Australia	
Win	1–0	(Australia) Emanuel Micallef	UD	4	2008-10-10	Mansfield Tavern, Mansfield, Queensland, Australia	
