= Boxing in the 2010s =

Boxing in the 2010s includes notable events about boxing which occurred between 2010 and 2019. The decade saw high intensity action in the welterweight division. The match between veterans Floyd Mayweather Jr. and Manny Pacquiao broke PPV records. The broadcast of the fight in the Philippines was watched by nearly half the country's households. Mayweather retired at a record 50–0–0 while Pacquiao became the first eight division champion. The middleweight division saw immense action in the later years of the decade. After a draw in 2017, Canelo Alvarez ended Gennady Golovkin's long reign in 2018. The heavyweight division was dominated by Klitschko brothers before Wladimir's loss to Tyson Fury in 2015. Other talents that emerged were Anthony Joshua, Deontay Wilder and undisputed cruiserweight champion Oleksander Usyk.

== Lists of notable fights and events by year ==
=== 2010 ===
==== January ====
- January 8 – Roman Karmazin knocks out Dionisio Miranda in the 10th round as part of an IBF middleweight title eliminator. This fight was later named the best middleweight fight of 2010 by Ring magazine.
- January 12 – Jermain Taylor withdraws from the Super Six World Boxing Classic, citing a need to reevaluate his career. Allan Green was made Taylor's replacement in the tournament.
- January 23 – Juan Manuel López knocks out Steven Luevano in the seventh round to become the WBO featherweight champion. This was López's debut at featherweight after vacating his former WBO junior featherweight title. The fight was Luevano's sixth attempt at defending the title.

==== February ====
- February 5 – Glen Johnson, at 41 years of age, knocks out Yusaf Mack – ranked as one of top ten light heavyweights in the world – in the sixth round.
- February 13 – Nonito Donaire knocks out Manuel Vargas in the third round to defend his interim WBA world super flyweight title.

==== March ====
- March 13 – Manny Pacquiao defeats Joshua Clottey, controlling the fight from start to finish and winning by unanimous decision. This was the first boxing match held at Cowboys Stadium in Arlington, Texas, drawing more than 41,000 people. This was Pacquiao's first defense of his newly awarded WBO welterweight title.
- March 20 – Wladimir Klitschko knocks out Eddie Chambers with a fierce left to the temple with five seconds left in the fight. Chambers was knocked out nearly instantly, collapsing to the canvas and hanging off the last rope. This was Klitschko's first defense of his Ring magazine heavyweight title, his fourth defense of his WBO heavyweight title, and his eighth defense of his IBF and IBO heavyweight titles.
- March 27 – Arthur Abraham is disqualified in the 11th round, to lose to Andre Dirrell. In the fourth round, Abraham was down for the first time in his career, and he was cut over the right eyebrow in the seventh round. The fight was part of the second-group stage of the Super Six World Boxing Classic.
- March 27 – Erik Morales comes out of a nearly 32-month retirement to defeat José Alfaro by unanimous decision and win the WBC international welterweight title.
- March 27 – Pongsaklek Wonjongkam defeats Kōki Kameda by majority decision to win the WBC flyweight title and vacant Ring magazine flyweight title. This is the second time Wonjongkam has become the WBC flyweight champion, first winning the title in March 2001. Wonjongkam had defended the title 17 times before losing to Daisuke Naito in July 2007. This fight is later named the best flyweight fight of 2010 by Ring magazine.
- March 27 – In the co-main event of Wonjongkam/Kameda, Oleydong Sithsamerchai defeats Yasutaka Kuroki by a unanimous decision to retain his WBC strawweight title for the sixth time. This fight was later named the best strawweight fight of 2010 by Ring magazine.

==== April ====
- April 3 – Bernard Hopkins defeats Roy Jones Jr. by unanimous decision in a rematch of their May 1993 fight, in which Jones Jr. won the vacant IBF middleweight title. The fight itself got little attention from the boxing media, even though it had been anticipated for many years in the boxing community. Following the rematch, the fight was widely criticized for its heavy use of illegal blows and a skirmish at the end of the sixth round.
- April 3 – David Haye stops John Ruiz in the ninth round after knocking him down four times. This was Haye's first mandatory defense of his newly awarded WBA heavyweight title.
- April 10 – Evander Holyfield, at 47 years of age, knocks out Francois Botha in the eighth round to win the World Boxing Federation heavyweight title.
- April 10 – Andre Berto defeats Carlos Quintana via referee stoppage in the eighth round to retain his WBC welterweight title for the fourth time. This was Berto's first fight since taking a brief hiatus for nearly a year to help in earthquake relief efforts in Haiti as well as to handle personal and family losses from the earthquake. During the fight, Berto injured his left biceps.
- April 10 – Arthur Mercante dies at the age of 90.
- April 17 – Lucian Bute knocks out Edison Miranda with a hard left uppercut in the third round. This was Bute's fifth defense of his IBF super middleweight title.
- April 17 – Kelly Pavlik losses to Sergio Martínez in a close fight for Pavlik's WBC, WBO, and Ring magazine middleweight titles. Martínez controlled the early rounds with quick in and out movements, refusing to heavily engage with Pavlik. Martínez managed to cut Pavlik's left eyebrow in the first round. Pavlik then started to mount a comeback in the middle rounds by blocking Martínez's punches more effectively. Pavlik spent most of his time headhunting trying to land a hard right, which did help Pavlik get a knockdown in the seventh round. In the late rounds Martínez came back and started to open up Pavlik's cuts more, making his face extremely blood. In the post fight interview Pavlik said he couldn't see due to the blood. Martínez ended up winning the fight with a unanimous decision.
- April 19 – Edwin Valero commits suicide at the age of 28. On April 18, Valero was detained on suspicion of killing his 24-year-old wife. The following day, he was found dead in his prison cell, with a picture of his family in his mouth, having hanged himself using the denim pants he was wearing. Valero, who had two occasions where allegations of assault were placed on him in 2009 and 2010 was a subject of some inquiry on his mental health following a motorcycle crash he suffered in 2001.
- April 24 – Mikkel Kessler upsets Carl Froch by a unanimous decision to win Froch's WBC super middleweight title. The fight was part of the second-group stage of the Super Six World Boxing Classic. Following the fight, Froch complained about a judging bias, seeing how the fight was held in Kessler's country of origin, Denmark. This fight was later named the best super middleweight fight of 2010 by Ring magazine.
- April 24 – Tomasz Adamek defeats Chris Arreola by a majority decision. Arreola had his moments and held his own throughout the fight however Adamek had landed more clean punches and accurate combinations throughout the fight. This was Adamek's second defense of his IBF international heavyweight title. This fight was later named the best heavyweight fight of 2010 by Ring magazine.
- April 30 – In a stunning upset, Fernando Montiel knocks out Hozumi Hasegawa, ending his five-year, 10 title defense streak and taking his WBC bantamweight title. The knockout came as a surprise due to Hasegawa seeming to be clearly leading until the end of the fourth, when Montiel landed a left that stunned Hasegawa and pushed him back to the ropes, where he unloaded until the referee stopped the fight.

==== May ====
- May 1 – Floyd Mayweather Jr. defeats Shane Mosley to continue his undefeated career streak. Mosley came out strong for the first two rounds—at one point making Mayweather's knees buckle—but Mayweather went on to control the fight.
- May 8 – In a brief fight between Paul Williams and Kermit Cintrón, Cintrón falls out of the ring and is forced by doctors to stop fighting, giving Williams a win by technical decision.
- May 8 – Making his comeback after roughly 15½ months of being suspended, Antonio Margarito defeated Roberto Garcia to win the vacant WBC international super welterweight title.
- May 8 – In a rematch of a 2009 fight, Hugo Cázares defeated Nobuo Nashiro to win the WBA world super flyweight title. This fight is later named the best super flyweight fight of 2010 by Ring magazine.
- May 13 – Manny Pacquiao is officially proclaimed congressman of the lone district of Sarangani.
- May 15 – Amir Khan dominates Paulie Malignaggi to win by TKO in the eleventh round and retain his WBA light welterweight title for the second time. This was Khan's debut in the United States.
- May 22 – In their fourth fight against each other Rafael Márquez evens the series to two wins for each man by stopping Israel Vázquez by TKO in the third round.
- May 29 – The WBO decides to strip Sergio Martínez of his middleweight title due to his unclear decision of what weight class he wants to fight in (160lbs or 154lbs). According to WBO bylaws no WBO champion may hold a non-WBO championship in a weight class that is different from the weight class of his WBO championship. Martínez never defended his WBO middleweight title and continued to hold the WBC and Ring magazine middleweight titles as well as the WBC light middleweight title.

==== June ====
- June 5 – Miguel Cotto defeats Yuri Foreman by ninth round stoppage due to a leg injury Foreman suffered during the fight. In an amazing display of will, Foreman refused to quit despite being in what he later called a "very sharp pain". A towel was thrown in the ring, but it was ruled to have come from an outside source, and the fight continued for another minute until being stopped officially. This was Cotto's debut at light middleweight. The fight was the first boxing match in the new Yankee stadium built in 2009, and the first match in either Yankee stadium since Ali/Norton 3 in 1976.
- June 19 – Andre Ward defeats Allan Green by unanimous decision. The fight was part of the second-group stage of the Super Six World Boxing Classic.
- June 26 – Julio César Chávez Jr. continues his undefeated streak and improves his record to 41–0 with one draw and one no contest, following a unanimous decision over John Duddy to win the WBC silver middleweight title.
- June 28 – Manny Pacquiao takes his oath of office as a congressman before Supreme Court Associate Justice Antonio T. Carpio in the Provincial Capitol of Sarangani in Municipality of Alabel.

==== July ====
- July 10 – Juan Manuel López stops Bernabé Concepción in a second-round TKO to defend his newly awarded WBO featherweight title. The first round of this fight was later named round of the year by Ring magazine.
- July 31 – In a rematch of 2009's fight of the year, Juan Manuel Márquez defeats Juan Díaz for a second time to retain his WBO lightweight title and to win the WBA super world lightweight title.
- July 31 – On the undercard of Márquez/Díaz 2, top-10-ranked lightweight Robert Guerrero defeated Joel Casamayor.

==== August ====
- August 7 – Tavoris Cloud defeats Glen Johnson by a unanimous decision. This is Cloud's first defence of his newly awarded IBF light heavyweight title. This fight was later named the best light heavyweight fight of 2010 by Ring magazine.
- August 8 – Devon Alexander wins a decision over Andriy Kotelnyk.
- August 9 – Jay Larkin dies due to a brain tumor at the age of 59.
- August 14 – Jean Pascal upsets Chad Dawson by a technical decision due to an accidental headbutt that caused a major cut over Dawson's right eye and the fight was stopped by the ring side doctor. However Pascal easily won the fight according to the judge's scorecards. Pascal defended his WBC light heavyweight title for the third time, won Dawson's IBO light heavyweight title, and filled the vacant Ring magazine light heavyweight title.
- August 21 – Marco Huck defeats Matt Godfrey by fifth-round TKO, to defend his WBO junior heavyweight title for the fourth time.
- August 25 – Mikkel Kessler withdraws from the Super Six World Boxing Classic, citing an eye injury he suffered in his November 2009 fight against Andre Ward. 41-year-old Glen Johnson was made Kesslers's replacement in the tournament.
- August 28 – Giovanni Segura upsets Iván Calderón by a knockout in the eighth round to win the WBO and WBA super world light flyweight titles. Segura ends Calderón's undefeated 34-fight winning record. This fight would later be named both the best light flyweight and overall fight of the year of 2010 by Ring magazine.

==== September ====
- September 4 – Felix Sturm defeats Giovanni Lorenzo by a unanimous decision in his first fight in over a year.
- September 4 – Ricky Burns upsets previously undefeated Román Martínez to end his 24–0 winning streak and win the WBO super featherweight title. This fight is later named the best super featherweight fight of 2010 by Ring magazine.
- September 9 – Floyd Mayweather Jr. is questioned by police after a domestic battery charge is filed against him.
- September 10 – Floyd Mayweather Jr. is taken into custody but is released on $3,000 bail. Initially, Mayweather is only charged with felony theft.
- September 11 – Yuriorkis Gamboa defeats Orlando Salido to unified the WBA (Regular) and vacant IBF featherweight titles. Gamboa was knocked down in the eighth round and was docked two points in the twelfth round. While Salido was knocked down twice in the twelfth round.
- September 11 – Wladimir Klitschko defeats Samuel Peter for the second time, in a rematch of their September 2005 fight.
- September 16 – Floyd Mayweather Jr. receives two felony coercion charges and one felony robbery charge added to his felony theft that he received earlier in the week, along with one misdemeanor domestic battery charge and three misdemeanor harassment charges. Collectively, the eight charges leave Mayweather Jr. with potentially up to 34 years in prison.
- September 18 – Shane Mosley vs. Sergio Mora ends in a controversial draw.
- September 18 – Alexander Frenkel knocks out Enzo Maccarinelli in the seventh round to win the EBU cruiserweight title. This fight is later named the best cruiserweight fight of 2010 by Ring magazine.

==== October ====
- October 2 – Poonsawat Kratingdaenggym losses to Ryol Li Lee in a stunning upset. This was Kratingdaenggym's first loss since July 2006 against Volodymyr Sydorenko. This fight was later named the best super bantamweight fight of 2010 by Ring magazine.
- October 7 – Andre Dirrell withdraws from the Super Six World Boxing Classic, citing neurological issues. No one was needed to replace Dirrell in the tournament.
- October 15 – In his first fight in more than 16 months Antonio Tarver, former light heavyweight champion, returns as a heavyweight to defeat Nagy Aguilera.
- October 16 – Vitali Klitschko defeats Shannon Briggs by a unanimous decision. This is only the third time Klitschko has won a fight by decision.

==== November ====
- November 6 – Juan Manuel López defeats Rafael Márquez by TKO, in an exciting fight that was stopped early due to Márquez suffering a shoulder injury following the eighth round. López defends his WBO featherweight title and improves his record to 30–0. This fight is later named the best featherweight fight of 2010 by Ring magazine.
- November 6 – As part of the co-main event to López/Márquez, in his Super Six debut Glen Johnson defeats Allan Green in an eighth-round knockout. This was Johnson's first time fighting in the super middleweight division since September 2000 when he defeated Toks Owoh by a sixth-round TKO.
- November 6 – Zab Judah continues his comeback by defeating previously unbeaten Lucas Matthysse by a controversial spit decision.
- November 13 – David Haye knocks out Olympic gold medallist Audley Harrison in a third-round TKO.
- November 13 – Manny Pacquiao defeats Antonio Margarito for the WBC super welterweight title, making Pacquiao the first and so far only boxer to win world titles in eight different weight classes. Following the fight, Margarito is sent to a hospital with a fractured orbital bone, which requires surgery. This is Margarito's first major fight in over 21 months, following a knockout loss to Shane Mosley in January 2009.
- November 13 – In the co-main event of Pacquiao/Margarito, Mike Jones defeats Jesús Soto Karass by a unanimous decision. Jones retains his NABA and WBO NABO titles and wins the vacant WBC continental Americas welterweight title. This fight is later named the best welterweight fight of 2010 by Ring magazine.
- November 17 – Danny Green defeats BJ Flores by unanimous decision, giving Flores his first career loss.
- November 20 – In a highly anticipated rematch, Sergio Martínez knocks out Paul Williams in the second round to retain his WBC and Ring magazine middleweight titles. This was later named knockout of the year by Ring magazine.
- November 26 – Following a loss in April 2010 that cost Hozumi Hasegawa his WBC bantamweight title, Hasegawa defeats Juan Carlos Burgos to win the vacant WBC featherweight belt.
- November 27 – Carl Froch upsets Arthur Abraham by controlling the fight from start to finish to win a unanimous decision. Both boxers were coming off their first losses. The fight was part of the third-group stage of the Super Six World Boxing Classic. Froch regains his WBC super middleweight title that was vacated by Mikkel Kessler.
- November 27 – Andre Ward defeats Sakio Bika by unanimous decision. The fight was the first of two non-tournament bout of the Super Six World Boxing Classic. Ward defends his WBA super world super middleweight title for the second time.
- November 27 – Juan Manuel Márquez defeats Michael Katsidis by ninth-round TKO. Katsidis was competitive throughout the fight and even scored a knockdown on Márquez in the third round, While Márquez fought a more solid fight, landing many combinations. Márquez defends his WBO, WBA, and Ring magazine lightweight titles. This fight is later named the best lightweight fight of 2010 by Ring magazine.
- November 27 – Dispute being a heavy underdog, Jason Litzau upsets Celestino Caballero via split decision. The fight, part of the Márquez/Katsidis undercard, was later named upset of the year by Ring magazine.
- November 27 – Miguel Vazquez defeats Ricardo Dominguez by unanimous decision to defend his newly awarded IBF lightweight title.

==== December ====
- December 4 – Paweł Wolak knocks out Jose Pinzon in the seventh round. This fight is later named the best junior middleweight fight of 2010 by Ring magazine.
- December 8 – A judge issues an arrest warrant for Floyd Mayweather Jr. stemming from a November 15 incident where Mayweather allegedly poked a security guard in the face several times over parking tickets.
- December 11 – Amir Khan defeats Marcos Maidana in a relatively close decision. Khan came out strong in the early part of the fight by applying heavy pressure on Maidana and getting a knockdown late in the first round. However, in the later parts of the fight, Khan spent much of his time avoiding Maidana, trying to endure through rounds. At one point, Maidana appeared to have almost finished Khan in the tenth round, when he landed a huge punch. But Khan absorbs the punishment and does enough to win by unanimous decision. Khan defends his WBA world light welterweight title for the third time. This fight is later named the best light welterweight fight of 2010 by Ring magazine. It is also awarded Fight of the Year by the Boxing Writers Association of America.
- December 11 – In the co-main event of Khan/Maidana, Victor Ortiz and Lamont Peterson settle with a somewhat controversial majority draw after ten rounds of boxing.
- December 11 – Abner Mares defeats Vic Darchinyan by split decision to start Showtime's second boxing tournament based on the Super Six World Boxing Classic. However instead featured only four fighters, a single elimination format, and was focused on the bantamweight division at 118 lbs (54 kg) under the title, The Bantamweight Tournament: Winner Takes All. This fight was later named the best bantamweight fight of 2010 by Ring magazine.
- December 11 – Following Mares/Darchinyan, Joseph Agbeko defeated Yonnhy Pérez in a rematch of their October 2009 fight in which Pérez defeated Agbeko.
- December 18 – Marco Huck continues his reign as WBO junior heavyweight champion by defeating Denis Lebedev by split decision.
- December 18 – Jean Pascal vs. Bernard Hopkins ends in a controversial majority draw. Pascal scores two flash knockdowns early, putting Hopkins on the canvas for the first time in more than a decade. The older fighter then adjusts and dominates most of the fight.
- December 23 – Hugo Cázares defeats Hiroyuki Hisataka by a unanimous decision to retain his WBA super flyweight title for the third time.
- December 28 – "Bad" Bennie Briscoe dies at the age of 67.

=== 2011 ===
==== January ====
- January 4 – Southern Highlands homeowners association files a lawsuit to the Clark County District Court seeking $10,000 in damages and an injunction against Floyd Mayweather Jr. This comes in addition to numerous other charges Mayweather Jr. is facing, including domestic battery, theft, coercion, robbery, and harassment.
- January 29 – Timothy Bradley defeats Devon Alexander by a tenth-round technical decision. The fight was stopped due to a cut Alexander had received from an accidental headbutt in the third round, which was made worse by two more headbutts in the eighth round and a final, fourth headbutt in the tenth. Both fighters came in with undefeated records, and the fight was initially praised as one of the few good match-ups between two top-ranked Americans in recent years. With the win, Bradley unified the light welterweight titles by defending his WBO title and winning Alexander's WBC title.

==== February ====
- February 4 – Sergio Mora losses to Brian Vera by controversial split decision. Vera had lost four of his last six fights.
- February 5 – Tomás Rojas defends his WBC super flyweight title for the first time, defeating Nobuo Nashiro in an exciting, back-and-forth fight.
- February 12 – Arthur Abraham defeats Stjepan Božić by an official second-round technical knockout. The fight was stopped after Božić punched Abraham's elbow and fractured his hand.
- February 15 – Manny Pacquiao visited the American capital of Washington during a press tour to have meetings with President Barack Obama and Nevada Senator Harry Reid.
- February 19 – Nonito Donaire defeats Fernando Montiel by technical knockout in the second round to unify the WBO and WBC bantamweight titles. Donaire started the fight strong by controlling most of the first round, landing a left hook that briefly stunned Montiel. In the second round, Donaire started landing a few combinations before finishing Montiel with a solid hook.
- February 19 – In the co-main event of Montiel/Donaire, a rematch against up-and-comer Mike Jones and Jesus Soto Karass. The first bout against the two boxers back in November 2010 for the co-main event to Pacquiao/Margarito ended in a controversial majority decision for Jones. In the rematch however, Jones controlled most of this fight, cutting Soto Karass over both eyes in the third round to win a strong unanimous decision.
- February 26 – Brandon Rios knocks out Miguel Acosta in the tenth round, to win the WBA world lightweight title. Acosta started the fight strong by controlling most of the early rounds. However a left hand to the body followed by a short jab caught Acosta in the sixth round and forced a knockdown. Acosta then appeared to be to have regained himself in the seventh round, just to be knocked down again in the eighth. The fight then ended with back-and-forth action from both fighters, with Rios landing three right hands to finish Ascota in the tenth.

==== March ====
- March 5 – Saúl Álvarez defeats Matthew Hatton by unanimous decision to become the WBC light middleweight champion.
- March 12 – Sergio Martínez knocks out undefeated Sergiy Dzindziruk in the eighth round to win the vacant WBC middleweight diamond belt.
- March 12 – Miguel Cotto knocks out Ricardo Mayorga in the twelfth round to retain his WBA world light middleweight title.
- March 12 – Yuri Foreman is knocked out by Paweł Wolak at the end of the sixth round. This was Foreman's first fight since coming off knee surgery following his fight with Miguel Cotto.
- March 19 – Vitali Klitschko knocks out Odlanier Solís in the first round to retain his WBC heavyweight title for the sixth time. The knockout came as a surprise after Solís appeared to sustain a serious knee injury. Initially, Klitschko was angry at Solís, thinking he'd taken a dive. However, Solís was taken to a hospital, where a scan revealed tears to his anterior cruciate ligament and external meniscus and cartilage damage in his right knee.
- March 19 – Lucian Bute knocks out Brian Magee in the tenth round to defend his IBF supper middleweight title for the seventh time.
- March 26 – Yuriorkis Gamboa knocks out Jorge Solis in the fourth round for the IBF and WBA world featherweight titles.

==== April ====
- April 2 – Giovanni Segura knocks out Iván Calderón in the third round in a repeat of 2010's fight of the year.
- April 8 – Marco Antonio Rubio upsets top-ranked prospect David Lemieux by seventh-round TKO.
- April 8 – Experienced veteran Jhonny González upsets the top-ranked Hozumi Hasegawa in a fourth-round TKO to win his WBC featherweight title. This was Hasegawa's second fight at featherweight since moving from bantamweight in late 2010.
- April 9 – Marcos Maidana defeats Erik Morales by majority decision to become the interim WBA light welterweight champion again.
- April 9 – In the co-main event to Maidana/Morales, Robert Guerrero defeats Michael Katsidis by unanimous decision. Guerrero wins the interim WBO and WBA world lightweight titles.
- April 16 – Amir Khan defeats Paul McCloskey by technical decision in round 6. McCloskey was cut by a clash of heads, and the bout was stopped by the ringside doctor.
- April 16 – Victor Ortiz defeats Andre Berto, by unanimous decision, to win the WBC Welterweight title and end Berto's undefeated record.
- April 16 – Orlando Salido defeats Juan Manuel Lopez by technical knockout in the 8th round. This puts an end to Lopez's undefeated record and an end to a potential unification bout with Yuriorkis Gamboa.
- April 23 – Vic Darchinyan defeats Yonnhy Perez.

==== May ====
- May 1 – Henry Cooper dies at the age of 76.
- May 7 – Manny Pacquiao defeats Shane Mosley by unanimous decision to retain his WBO welterweight title.
- May 7 – Also on the Pacquiao/Mosley card, Kelly Pavlik defeats Alfonso López via majority decision. This was Pavlik's first fight in over a year after being defeated by Sergio Martínez and losing his Ring magazine, WBC, and WBO middleweight titles. It was also Pavlik's debut at super middleweight.
- May 7 – At 48 years old, Evander Holyfield knocks out 46-year-old Brian Nielsen in the tenth round.
- May 7 – Daniel Geale upsets Sebastian Sylvester by split decision.
- May 8 – Lionel Rose dies at the age of 62.
- May 14 – Andre Ward defeats Arthur Abraham by unanimous decision to retain his WBA Super World Super Middleweight title. The win advanced him to the Finals of the Super Six tournament.
- May 21 – Bernard Hopkins defeats Jean Pascal. Hopkins, at age 46, becomes the oldest man in the history of boxing to win a major world title, supplanting George Foreman, who had previously held the distinction after his knockout victory over Michael Moorer.
- May 21 – As part of the Hopkins/Pascal card, Chad Dawson defeats Adrian Diaconu nine months after his loss to Pascal. It was Dawson's first fight under Hall of Fame trainer Emanuel Steward.
- May 21 – Denis Lebedev brutally knocks out Roy Jones Jr. in the 10th round. Jones falls face first to the canvas and is unconscious for several minutes.

==== June ====
- June 4 – Julio Cesar Chavez Jr. defeats Sebastian Zbik by majority decision to capture the WBC Middleweight title and become the first Mexican to win a major title in the middleweight division.
- June 4 – Carl Froch defeats Glen Johnson by majority decision to retain his WBC Super Middleweight title and position himself to face Andre Ward in the Super Six finals.
- June 18 – Saul Alvarez defeats Ryan Rhodes by technical knockout in the 12th round to successfully defends his WBC title for the first time.
- June 25 – Felix Sturm defeats Matthew Macklin in an extremely close and controversial split decision to retain his WBA super world middleweight title.
- June 25 – Devon Alexander defeats Lucas Matthysse in a close split decision.
- June 25 – In the co-main event of Alexander/Matthysse, Tavoris Cloud knocks out Yusaf Mack at the end of the eighth round to improve to 22–0 and defend his IBF light heavyweight title for the third time.
- June 25 – Also on the same card as Alexander/Matthysse, Cornelius Bundrage upsets Sechew Powell by unanimous decision to defend his newly awarded IBF light middleweight title for the first time.

==== July ====
- July 2 – Wladimir Klitschko defeats David Haye by unanimous decision. Klitschko, already the holder of four heavyweight championships, adds Haye's WBA title to his collection.
- July 2 – Following his upset lost to Jason Litzau, Celestino Caballero losses another split decision to Jonathan Victor Barros.
- July 9 – Brandon Ríos knocks out Urbano Antillón in the third round.
- July 9 – Top-ranked Akifumi Shimoda is knocked out by Rico Ramos in a huge upset.
- July 9 – Paul Williams defeats Erislandy Lara in a highly disputed decision.
- July 16 – In a stunning upset, John Murray is knocked out by Kevin Mitchell in the eighth round.
- July 20 – Antonio Tarver stops Danny Green in the ninth round to win the IBO cruiserweight title.
- July 23 – Amir Khan knocks out Zab Judah in the fifth round.

==== August ====
- August 13 – Abner Mares wins a highly disputed majority decision over Joseph Agbeko.
- August 13 – Kimbo Slice makes his boxing debut with a 17-second knockout of James Wade.
- August 19 – Suriyan Sor Rungvisai wins a decision over Tomas Rojas to win WBC title.
- August 27 – Alexander Povetkin defeats Ruslan Chagaev by decision.
- August 27 – Raul Garcia losses a split decision to prospect Moises Fuentes to lose his WBO minimumweight title.
- August 31 – Hugo Fidel Cazares losses a split decision to Tomonobu Shimizu and WBA title.

==== September ====
- September 3 – Andre Berto stops Dejan Zavec at the end of the fifth round by a medical stoppage after Zavec's right eye closed and suffered a serious cut.
- September 10 – Vitali Klitschko knocks out Tomasz Adamek in the tenth round.
- September 10 – Yuriorkis Gamboa wins a technical decision over Daniel Ponce de Leon.
- September 10 – Juan Carlos Salgado wins a decision over Argenis Mendez for the vacant IBF title.
- September 17 – Saul Alvarez knocks out Alfonso Gomez in the sixth round.
- September 17 – Floyd Mayweather Jr. knocks out Victor Ortiz in what many deemed a sucker punch in the fourth round to remain undefeated.

==== October ====
- October 1 – Andy Lee wins a decision over Brian Vera.
- October 1 – Sergio Martínez knocks out Darren Barker in the 11th round.
- October 1 – Toshiaki Nishioka wins a decision over Rafael Marquez to defend WBC super bantamweight title.
- October 1 – Karo Murat versus Gabriel Campillo ends in a split draw.
- October 1 – Yoan Pablo Hernández wins a technical decision over Steve Cunningham.
- October 8 – Donnie Nietes defeats Ramon Garcia Hirales for WBO light flyweight title.
- October 8 – British prospect Kell Brook knocks out Rafal Jackiewicz in the sixth round.
- October 15 – In what is later changed to a No Contest, Bernard Hopkins is unable to continue after injuring his shoulder in the 2nd round of a light heavyweight fight with Chad Dawson. Dawson was initially awarded a knockout victory.
- October 15 – Kimbo Slice scores his second career knockout, stopping Tay Bledsoe in just under two minutes.
- October 21 – Pongsaklek Wonjongkam defeats Edgar Sosa to defend his WBC flyweight title.
- October 22 – Nonito Donaire wins a one-sided decision over Omar Andres Narvaez
- October 22 – Miguel Acosta losses a decision against Richard Abril in a big upset.
- October 29 – Hernan Marquez knocks out Luis Concepcion in the first round to defend the WBA belt.

==== November ====
- November 4 – Suriyan Sor Rungvisai wins a decision over Nobuo Nashiro.
- November 4 – Denis Lebedev wins a one-sided decision over James Toney.
- November 5 – Ricky Burns wins a decision over Michael Katsidis.
- November 5 – James Kirkland wins a major upset by knocking out Alfredo Angulo in the sixth round.
- November 5 – Lucian Bute wins a one-sided decision over veteran Glen Johnson.
- November 7 – Joe Frazier dies due to liver cancer.

=== 2012 ===
==== February ====
- February 4 – Julio César Chávez Jr. defeats Marco Antonio Rubio by unanimous decision.
- February 18 – Vitali Klitschko defeats Derek Chisora by unanimous decision. A post fight brawl between Chisora and former 2 division champion David Haye would see Chisora have his boxing license withdrawn.

==== March ====
- March 3 – Wladimir Klitschko defeats Jean-Marc Mormeck by 4th-round TKO
- March 18 – Sergio Martínez defeats Matthew Macklin by 11th-round RTD
- March 18 – Kell Brook defeats Matthew Hatton by unanimous decision.
- March 24 – Danny Garcia defeats Erik Morales by unanimous decision.

==== April ====
- April 28 – Chad Dawson defeats Bernard Hopkins by majority decision to win the WBC and The Ring light heavyweight titles.

==== May ====
- May 5 – Floyd Mayweather Jr. defeats Miguel Cotto by unanimous decision.
- May 5 – Canelo Álvarez defeats Shane Mosley by unanimous decision.
- May 26 – Carl Froch defeats Lucian Bute by 5th-round TKO

==== June ====
- June 9 – Timothy Bradley defeats Manny Pacquiao by split decision.
- June 16 – Julio Cesar Chavez Jr. defeats Andy Lee by 7th-round TKO.

==== July ====
- July 7 – Wladimir Klitschko defeats Tony Thompson by 6th-round KO in their rematch.
- July 14 – David Haye defeats Derek Chisora by 5th-round KO in a bout licensed by the Luxembourg Boxing Federation.
- July 14 – Danny Garcia defeats Amir Khan by 4th-round TKO to unify the WBC and WBA light welterweight titles.

==== September ====
- September 1 – Daniel Geale defeats Felix Sturm by split decision to unify the WBA and IBF middleweight titles.
- September 8 – Vitali Klitschko defeats Manuel Charr by 4th-round TKO in what would ultimately be the final bout of his career.
- September 8 – Andre Ward defeats Chad Dawson by 10th-round TKO.
- September 15 – Sergio Martínez defeats Julio César Chávez Jr. by unanimous decision to regain the WBC belt and defend his Ring and lineal titles.

==== October ====
- October 20 – Danny Garcia defeats Erik Morales by fourth-round KO in their rematch.

==== November ====
- November 10 – Wladimir Klitschko defeats Mariusz Wach by unanimous decision.
- November 24 – Vyacheslav Senchenko defeats Ricky Hatton by 9th-round KO, Hatton would retire for good after the bout.
- November 24 – Robert Guerrero defeats Andre Berto by unanimous decision.

==== December ====
- December 8 – Mikkel Kessler defeats Brian Magee by 3rd-round KO
- December 8 – Juan Manuel Márquez knocks out Manny Pacquiao in the 6th round in the fourth and final bout between the two.
- December 15 – George Groves defeats Glen Johnson by unanimous decision to win the Commonwealth super middleweight title.
- December 22 – Tomasz Adamek defeats Steve Cunningham by a controversial split decision in their second bout.

=== 2013 ===
==== February ====
- February 23 – Tony Thompson upset unbeaten David Price by 2nd-round KO

==== March ====
- March 9 – Bernard Hopkins defeats Tavoris Cloud by unanimous decision to win the IBF light heavyweight titles, breaking his record as the oldest fighter to win a major world title in boxing history.
- March 16 – Timothy Bradley defeats Ruslan Provodnikov by unanimous decision, which would be voted Fight of the Year by Ring magazine.

==== April ====
- April 13 – Guillermo Rigondeaux defeats Nonito Donaire by unanimous decision to unify WBA (Super), WBO, The Ring and TBRB super bantamweight titles.
- April 20 – Canelo Álvarez defeats Austin Trout by unanimous decision to retain the WBC and win the vacant The Ring light-middleweight titles.
- April 20 – Tyson Fury defeats Steve Cunningham by 7th-round KO.
- April 27 – Danny Garcia defeats Zab Judah by unanimous decision.

==== May ====
- May 4 – Wladimir Klitschko defeats Francesco Pianeta by 6th-round TKO
- May 4 – Floyd Mayweather Jr. defeats Robert Guerrero by unanimous decision.
- May 25 – Carl Froch defeats Mikkel Kessler by unanimous decision in their rematch.

==== June ====
- June 8 – Adonis Stevenson knocks out Chad Dawson in the first round to win the WBC and The Ring light heavyweight titles, which would be voted Knockout of the Year by Ring magazine.
- June 22 – Adrien Broner defeats Paulie Malignaggi by split decision.
- June 29 – Gennady Golovkin defeats Matthew Macklin by 3rd-round KO

==== July ====
- July 6 – Tony Thompson defeats David Price by 5th-round TKO in their rematch.

==== August ====
- August 17 – Sergey Kovalev defeats Nathan Cleverly by 4th-round TKO to win the WBO light heavyweight title.
- August 17 – Darren Barker defeats Daniel Geale by split decision to win the IBF middleweight title.

==== September ====
- September 14 – Floyd Mayweather Jr. defeats Canelo Álvarez by majority decision.

==== October ====
- October 5 – Wladimir Klitschko defeats Alexander Povetkin by unanimous decision.
- October 12 – Timothy Bradley defeats Juan Manuel Márquez by split decision.
- October 26 – Bernard Hopkins defeats Karo Murat by unanimous decision.

==== November ====
- November 16 – Andre Ward defeats Edwin Rodríguez by unanimous decision.
- November 17 – Former heavyweight champion David Haye pulls out of a 8 February 2014 bout with unbeaten contender Tyson Fury after shoulder surgery.
- November 23 – Carl Froch defeats George Groves by controversial 7th-round TKO.
- November 30 – Adonis Stevenson defeats Tony Bellew by 6th-round TKO.

==== December ====
- December 7 – Felix Sturm defeats Darren Barker by 2nd-round TKO to win the IBF middleweight title.
- December 14 – Marcos Maidana defeats Adrien Broner by unanimous decision, which would be voted Upset of the Year by Ring magazine.
- December 15 – Vitali Klitschko retires from boxing

=== 2014 ===
==== January ====
- January 18 – Jean Pascal defeats Lucian Bute by unanimous decision to win the vacant WBC Diamond Light heavyweight championship.

==== March ====
- March 1 – Terence Crawford defeats Ricky Burns by unanimous decision to win the WBO lightweight title.
- March 1 – Orlando Salido defeats Vasiliy Lomachenko by controversial split decision.
- March 8 – Canelo Álvarez defeats Alfredo Angulo by 10th-round TKO.

==== April ====
- April 12 – Manny Pacquiao defeats Timothy Bradley by unanimous decision in their rematch.
- April 19 – Bernard Hopkins defeats Beibut Shumenov by split decision to unify the WBA and IBF light-heavyweight titles, becoming the oldest boxer in history to become a unified champion.
- April 26 – Wladimir Klitschko defeats Alex Leapai by 5th-round KO.
- April 26 – Lucas Matthysse defeats John Molina Jr. by 11th-round TKO, which would be voted Fight of the Year by Ring magazine.

==== May ====
- May 3 – Floyd Mayweather Jr. defeats Marcos Maidana by majority decision.
- May 10 – Bermane Stiverne defeats Chris Arreola in their rematch to win the vacant WBC heavyweight title.
- May 31 – Sam Soliman defeats Felix Sturm by unanimous decision to win the IBF middleweight title.
- May 31 – Carl Froch defeats George Groves by 8th-round knockout in front of 80,000 people at Wembley Stadium. This was later named knockout of the year by Ring magazine.

==== June ====
- June 7 – Miguel Cotto stops Sergio Martínez in the 10th round to win the WBC, The Ring and lineal middleweight titles.
- June 21 – Vasiliy Lomachenko defeats Gary Russell Jr. by majority decision to win the vacant WBO featherweight title.

==== July ====
- July 12 – Canelo Álvarez defeats Erislandy Lara by split decision.

==== August ====
- August 16 –Kell Brook defeats Shawn Porter by majority decision to win the IBF welterweight title.

==== September ====
- September 13 – Floyd Mayweather Jr. defeats Marcos Maidana by unanimous decision.

==== October ====
- October 8 – Jermain Taylor defeats Sam Soliman by unanimous decision to win the IBF middleweight title.

==== November ====
- November 8 – Sergey Kovalev defeats Bernard Hopkins by unanimous decision to unify the WBA, IBF and WBO light heavyweight titles.
- November 15 – Wladimir Klitschko defeats Kubrat Pulev by 5th-round knockout.
- November 22 – Manny Pacquiao defeats Chris Algieri by unanimous decision.
- November 29 – Tyson Fury defeats Derek Chisora by 10th-round RTD in their rematch.
- November 29 – Billy Joe Saunders defeats Chris Eubank Jr. to defend the British, Commonwealth, and European middleweight titles

==== December ====
- December 13 – Amir Khan defeats Devon Alexander by unanimous decision.

=== 2015 ===
- January 17 – Deontay Wilder defeats Bermane Stiverne by unanimous decision to win the WBC heavyweight title, the first American heavyweight titleholder since Shannon Briggs lost his WBO belt to Sultan Ibragimov in June 2007.
- March 14 – Sergey Kovalev defeats Jean Pascal by eighth-round TKO

==== April ====
- April 24 – Badou Jack defeats Anthony Dirrell by majority decision to win the WBC super middleweight title
- April 25 – Wladimir Klitschko defeats Bryant Jennings by unanimous decision

==== May ====
- May 2 – Floyd Mayweather Jr. defeats Manny Pacquiao by unanimous decision to remain undefeated.
- May 9 – Canelo Álvarez defeats James Kirkland by 3rd-round knockout. This was later named knockout of the year by Ring magazine.
- May 23 – James DeGale defeats Andre Dirrell by unanimous decision to win the vacant IBF super-middleweight title
- May 30 – Kell Brook defeats Frankie Gavin by 6th-round TKO
- May 30 – Jorge Linares defeats Kevin Mitchell by 10th-round TKO
- May 30 – Lee Selby defeats Evgeny Gradovich by eighth-round technical decision to win the IBF featherweight title
- May 30 – Anthony Joshua defeats Kevin Johnson by 2nd-round TKO

==== June ====
- June 6 – Miguel Cotto defeats Daniel Geale by 4th-round TKO
- June 13 – Deontay Wilder defeats Eric Molina by 9th-round knockout
- June 20 – Shawn Porter defeats Adrien Broner by unanimous decision
- June 20 – Former unified super middleweight champion Andre Ward returned to the ring after a 19 month long lay off, stopping Paul Smith in the 9th round
- June 27 – Timothy Bradley defeats Jessie Vargas by unanimous decision to win the vacant WBO welterweight title

==== July ====
- July 11 – Terry Flanagan defeats Jose Zepeda by 2nd round retirement to win the vacant WBO lightweight title
- July 14 – IBF super middleweight champion Carl Froch retires from boxing
- July 18 – Scott Quigg defeats Kiko Martinez by 2nd-round KO
- July 18 – WBA lightweight champion Darleys Pérez drew with Anthony Crolla

==== August ====
- August 14 – Krzysztof Glowacki defeats Marco Huck by 11th round stoppage to win the WBO cruiserweight title

==== September ====
- September 12 – Anthony Joshua defeats Gary Cornish by first-round TKO to win the vacant Commonwealth heavyweight title
- September 12 – Floyd Mayweather Jr. defeats Andre Berto by unanimous decision to retain the WBC, IBF and The Ring welterweight titles. This would be the final world title bout of Mayweather's career as he would announce his retirement in the ring after the bout.
- September 12 – Badou Jack defeats George Groves by split decision
- September 26 – Deontay Wilder defeats Johann Duhaupas by 11th-round TKO

==== October ====
- October 10 – Liam Smith defeats John Thompson by 7th-round KO to win the WBO light middleweight title
- October 17 – Gennady Golovkin defeats David Lemieux by 8th-round TKO

==== November ====
- November 21 – Anthony Crolla defeats Darleys Pérez by 5th-round KO to win the WBA lightweight title
- November 21 – Canelo Álvarez defeats Miguel Cotto by unanimous decision to win WBC, The Ring and lineal middleweight titles.
- November 21 – Francisco Vargas defeats Takashi Miura by 9th-round TKO to win the WBC super featherweight title, which would be voted Fight of the Year by Ring magazine.
- November 28 – Wladimir Klitschko is defeated by British boxer Tyson Fury by unanimous decision, ending an almost decade-long reign as the Heavyweight Champion of the World.
- November 28 – James DeGale defeats Lucian Bute by unanimous decision

==== December ====
- December 12 – Enzo Maccarinelli defeats Roy Jones Jr by fourth-round KO
- December 12 – Patrick Nielsen defeats Rudy Markussen by 3rd-round TKO
- December 12 – Anthony Joshua defeats Dillian Whyte by 7th-round knockout to win the British and retain the Commonwealth heavyweight titles
- December 19 – Billy Joe Saunders defeats Andy Lee by majority decision to win the WBO middleweight title

=== 2016 ===
==== January ====
- January 16 – After three and half years out of the ring, former heavyweight champion David Haye made his return to the ring, stopping unbeaten Mark de Mori in the 1st round
- January 16 – Deontay Wilder defeats Artur Szpilka by 9th-round knockout
- January 16 – Charles Martin defeats Vyacheslav Glazkov by 3rd round retirement to win the vacant IBF heavyweight title
- January 23 – Danny Garcia defeats Robert Guerrero by unanimous points decision to win the vacant WBC welterweight title
- January 30 – Sergey Kovalev defeats Jean Pascal by 7th round stoppage in their rematch

==== February ====
- February 20 – Felix Sturm defeats Fedor Chudinov by majority decision to win the WBA super-middleweight title in their rematch
- February 27 – Carl Frampton defeats Scott Quigg by split decision to retain the IBF and win the WBA super-bantamweight title

==== April ====
- April 9 – Anthony Joshua defeats Charles Martin by 2nd-round KO to win the IBF heavyweight title
- April 9 – Manny Pacquiao defeats Timothy Bradley by unanimous decision.
- April 30 – James DeGale defeats Rogelio Medina by unanimous decision
- April 30 – Badou Jack defeats Lucian Bute by majority decision

==== May ====
- May 7 – Kubrat Pulev defeats Derek Chisora by split decision to win the vacant European heavyweight title
- May 7 – Canelo Álvarez knocks out Amir Khan in the 6th round. This was later named knockout of the year by Ring magazine.
- May 21 – Denis Lebedev defeats Victor Emilio Ramírez by 2nd-round TKO to unify the WBA and IBF cruiserweight titles
- May 28 – Ricky Burns stops Michele di Rocco to win the vacant WBA light welterweight title, becoming only the second Brit to win major title at three different weights.
- May 29 – Tony Bellew defeats Ilunga Makabu by 3rd-round KO to win the WBC cruiserweight title

==== June ====
- June 3 – Muhammad Ali dies at the age of 74 from septic shock due to unspecified natural causes.
- June 4 – Francisco Vargas draws with Orlando Salido, which would be voted Fight of the Year by Ring magazine.
- June 11 – Vasyl Lomachenko defeats Román Martínez by 5th-round KO to win the WBO super-featherweight title
- June 25 – Anthony Joshua defeats Dominic Breazeale by 7th-round TKO
- June 25 – Keith Thurman defeats Shawn Porter by unanimous decision to retain the WBA welterweight title
- June 26 – Unified WBA, WBO and The Ring heavyweight champion Tyson Fury and his cousin Hughie Fury tested positive for the banned substance nandrolone.

==== July ====
- July 16 – Deontay Wilder defeats Chris Arreola by 8th round retirement
- July 23 – Terence Crawford defeats Viktor Postol by unanimous points decision to unify the WBC and WBO and win the vacant The Ring light-welterweight titles
- July 30 – Carl Frampton defeats Léo Santa Cruz by majority decision to win the WBA featherweight title

==== September ====
- September 9 – Robert Easter Jr. defeats Richard Commey by split decision to win the vacant IBF lightweight title
- September 10 – Gennady Golovkin defeats Kell Brook by 5th-round TKO
- September 17 – Oleksandr Usyk defeats Krzysztof Glowacki by unanimous decision to win the WBO cruiserweight title
- September 17 – Canelo Álvarez defeats Liam Smith by ninth-round KO to the WBO light-middleweight title
- September 23 – Tyson Fury postponed his rematch with Wladimir Klitschko for the second time after being declared "medically unfit".
- September 24 – Jorge Linares defeats Anthony Crolla by unanimous decision to win the WBA and the vacant The Ring lightweight title

==== October ====
- October 12 – Tyson Fury vacates the WBA and WBO titles in order to "allow him the time and space to fully recover from his present condition without any undue pressure and with the expert medical attention he requires". He would however continue to be recognized as The Ring champion.

==== November ====
- November 3 – Murat Gassiev defeats Denis Lebedev by split decision to win the IBF cruiserweight title
- November 5 – Manny Pacquiao defeats Jessie Vargas by unanimous decision to win WBO welterweight title
- November 18 – George Groves defeats Eduard Gutknecht by unanimous decision to retain WBA International super-middleweight title. After the bout Gutknecht suffered a bleed in the skull and collapsed in the dressing room. He was rushed to a London hospital and had emergency surgery. His injuries would leave him unable to walk or talk and he suffered multiple strokes.
- November 19 – Andre Ward defeats Sergey Kovalev by a somewhat controversial unanimous decision to win WBA, IBF and WBO light heavyweight titles

==== December ====
- December 10 – Joseph Parker defeats Andy Ruiz Jr. by majority decision to win the vacant WBO heavyweight title
- December 10 – Anthony Joshua defeats Éric Molina by 3rd-round TKO
- December 10 – Dillian Whyte defeats Derek Chisora by split decision
- December 17 – In his final professional bout Bernard Hopkins was knocked out of the ring by Joe Smith Jr. giving him an 8th-round TKO victory, the only stoppage loss of Hopkins' career
- December 17 – Oleksandr Usyk defeats Thabiso Mchunu by 9th-round KO

=== 2017 ===
==== January ====
- January 14 – James DeGale and Badou Jack fight to a majority draw with the WBC, IBF and The Ring super middleweight titles on the line.
- January 28 – Léo Santa Cruz defeats Carl Frampton by majority decision to win the WBA featherweight title in their rematch

==== February ====
- February 25 – Deontay Wilder defeats Gerald Washington by 5th-round TKO

==== March ====
- March 4 – Tony Bellew defeats David Haye by 11th-round TKO
- March 4 – Keith Thurman defeats Danny Garcia by split decision to unify the WBC and WBA welterweight titles
- March 18 – Gennady Golovkin defeats Daniel Jacobs by unanimous decision
- March 25 – Jorge Linares defeats Anthony Crolla by unanimous decision in their rematch

==== April ====
- April 1 – Mairis Briedis defeats Marco Huck by unanimous decision to win the vacant WBC cruiserweight title
- April 15 – Julius Indongo defeats Ricky Burns by unanimous decision to unify the WBA, IBF and IBO light welterweight titles
- April 29 – Anthony Joshua stops Wladimir Klitschko in the 11th round, which would be voted Fight of the Year by Ring magazine.

==== May ====
- May 6 – Canelo Álvarez defeats Julio Cesar Chavez Jr. by unanimous decision.
- May 20 – Gervonta Davis defeats Liam Walsh by third-round TKO to retain the IBF super-featherweight title
- May 27 – Errol Spence Jr. defeats Kell Brook by 11th TKO to win the IBF welterweight title
  - George Groves defeats Fedor Chudinov by 6th-round TKO to win the vacant WBA super middleweight title

==== June ====
- June 10 – Ryan Burnett defeats Lee Haskins by unanimous decision to win the IBF bantamweight title
- June 17 – Andre Ward defeats Sergey Kovalev by 8th-round TKO in their rematch.
- June 17 – Guillermo Rigondeaux retained his WBA super-bantamweight title with a no contest with Moises Flores after a due to incorrect referee call after the 1st round

==== July ====
- July 2 – Jeff Horn defeats Manny Pacquiao by unanimous decision to retain the WBO welterweight title.
- July 8 – The World Boxing Super Series draft is held at the Grimaldi Forum in Monaco for the two inaugural tournaments at cruiserweight and super middleweight
- July 15 – Chris Eubank Jr defeats Arthur Abraham by unanimous decision to retain the IBO super-middleweight title and qualify for the World Boxing Super Series

==== August ====
- August 3 – Former long regaining heavyweight champion Wladimir Klitschko announced on his official website and social media channels that he was retiring from boxing.
- August 6 – Former two division champion Timothy Bradley officially announced his retirement from professional boxing, having not fought since his lost to Pacquiao more than a year earlier.
- August 17 – Former pound for pound No.1 and three division champion Shane Mosley announced his retirement after a 24-year career.
- August 19 – Terence Crawford defeats Julius Indongo by 3rd-round knockout to become the undisputed light welterweight champion, the first undisputed champion of the four belt era.
- August 26 – Floyd Mayweather Jr. stops UFC fighter (and boxing debutant) Conor McGregor in the 10th round.
- August 26 – Miguel Cotto defeats Yoshihiro Kamegai by unanimous decision to win the vacant WBO light-middleweight

==== September ====
- September 8 – David Benavidez defeats Ronald Gavril by split decision to win the vacant WBC super middleweight title
- September 9 – In the first quarter final of the WBSS Oleksandr Usyk defeats Marco Huck by 10th-round TKO
- September 16 – Callum Smith defeats Erik Skoglund by unanimous decision in a WBSS quarter final
- September 16 – Billy Joe Saunders defeats Willie Monroe Jr. by unanimous decision
- September 16 – The highly anticipated middleweight title fight between Gennady Golovkin and Canelo Álvarez ends in a draw.
- September 21 – Unified light heavyweight champion Andre Ward announced his retirement from boxing at the age of 33.
- September 23 – Joseph Parker defeats Hughie Fury by majority decision
- September 23 – Yuniel Dorticos defeats Dmitry Kudryashov by 2nd-round KO to retain the WBA cruiserweight title in a WBSS quarter final
- September 23 – Jorge Linares defeats Luke Campbell by split decision
- September 30 – Mairis Briedis defeats Mike Perez by unanimous decision to retain WBC cruiserweight title in a WBSS quarter final

==== October ====
- October 7 – Chris Eubank Jr. defeats Avni Yildirim by 3rd-round knockout by unanimous decision in a WBSS quarter final
- October 7 – Anthony Crolla defeats Ricky Burns by unanimous decision
- October 14 – George Groves defeats Jamie Cox by 4th-round KO in a WBSS quarter final
- October 14 – Jarrett Hurd defeats Austin Trout by 10th-round retirement to retain IBF light middleweight title
- October 21 – Ryan Burnett defeats Zhanat Zhakiyanov by unanimous decision to unify the IBF and WBA bantamweight titles
- October 21 – Murat Gassiev defeats Krzysztof Włodarczyk by 3rd-round KO to retain IBF cruiserweight title in a WBSS quarter final
- October 27 – Jürgen Brähmer defeats Rob Brant by unanimous decision in a WBSS quarter final
- October 28 – Anthony Joshua defeats Carlos Takam by 10th-round TKO
  - Dillian Whyte defeats Robert Helenius by unanimous decision
  - Katie Taylor defeats Anahí Ester Sánchez to win the vacant WBA lightweight title
  - Khalid Yafai defeats Sho Ishida to retain the WBA super-flyweight title

==== November ====
- November 4 – Deontay Wilder defeats Bermane Stiverne by 1st-round knockout in their rematch
- November 11 – Artur Beterbiev defeats Enrico Kölling by 12th-round KO to win the vacant IBF light heavyweight title
- November 25 – Sergey Kovalev defeats Vyacheslav Shabranskyy by 2nd-round TKO to win the vacant WBO light-heavyweight title

==== December ====
- December 2 – Sadam Ali defeats Miguel Cotto by unanimous decision to win the WBO light-middleweight title, Cotto would retire after the bout
- December 9 – Caleb Truax defeats James DeGale by majority decision to win the IBF super-middleweight
- December 9 – Vasiliy Lomachenko defeats Guillermo Rigondeaux by 6th round retirement t0 retain the WBO super-featherweight title
- December 13 – Katie Taylor defeats Jessica McCaskill by unanimous points victory to retain the WBA lightweight title
- December 16 – Billy Joe Saunders defeats David Lemieux by unanimous decision

=== 2018 ===
==== January ====
- January 12 – Claressa Shields defeats Tori Nelson by unanimous decision to retain WBC and IBF, win the vacant lineal, super middleweight titles
- January 20 – Errol Spence Jr. defeats Lamont Peterson by 8th-round TKO
- January 27 – In the first semi-final of the WBSS Oleksandr Usyk defeats Mairis Briedis by majority decision to unify the WBC and WBO cruiserweight titles

==== February ====
- February 3 – Murat Gassiev defeats Yuniel Dorticos by 12th-round TKO to unify the WBA and IBF cruiserweight titles in a WBSS semi final
- February 17 – George Groves defeats Chris Eubank Jr. by unanimous decision in a WBSS semi final
- February 24 – Callum Smith defeats late replacement Nieky Holzken by unanimous decision in a WBSS semi final

==== March ====
- March 3 – Deontay Wilder defeats Luis Ortiz by 10th-round KO
- March 24 – Dillian Whyte defeats Lucas Browne by 6th-round KO
- March 31 – Anthony Joshua defeats Joseph Parker by unanimous decision to unify the WBA, IBF and WBO heavyweight titles

==== April ====
- April 7 – James DeGale defeats Caleb Truax by unanimous decision in their rematch to win back the IBF super-middleweight title
- April 7 – Jarrett Hurd defeats Erislandy Lara by split decision to unify the WBA and IBF light-middleweight titles
- April 21 – Carl Frampton defeats Nonito Donaire by unanimous decision to win WBO interim featherweight title

==== May ====
- May 5 – Tony Bellew defeats David Haye by fifth-round TKO in their rematch.
- May 12 – Vasyl Lomachenko defeats Jorge Linares to win the WBA and The Ring lightweight titles, becoming a three division champion.
- May 12 – Jaime Munguía defeats Sadam Ali by 4th-round TKO to win the WBO light middleweight title
- May 19 – Josh Warrington defeats Lee Selby by split decision to win the IBF featherweight title
- May 19 – Adonis Stevenson has a majority draw with Badou Jack

==== June ====
- June 9 – After a 32-month absence from the ring, The Ring and Lineal heavyweight champion Tyson Fury returns to defeat Sefer Seferi by 4th round retirement
- June 9 – Maurice Hooker defeats Terry Flanagan by split decision to win the WBO super-lightweight title
- June 9 – Terence Crawford defeats Jeff Horn by 9th-round TKO to win the WBO welterweight title, becoming a three division champion.
- June 18 – Former two division champion David Haye released a statement via social media announcing his retirement from boxing at the age of 37.
- June 23 – Josh Taylor defeats Viktor Postol by unanimous decision

==== July ====
- July 15 – Manny Pacquiao defeats Lucas Matthysse by 7th-round KO to win WBA (Regular) welterweight title
- July 15 – Rocky Fielding defeats Tyron Zeuge to win WBA (Regular) super-middleweight title by 5th-round TKO
- July 21 – Oleksandr Usyk defeats Murat Gassiev by unanimous decision to become the first undisputed cruiserweight champion in the four belt era (and the first at all since O'Neil Bell in 2006), at the 2017-18 World Boxing Super Series - cruiserweight division final
- July 21 – Jaime Munguía defeats Liam Smith by unanimous decision to retain WBO light middleweight title
- July 28 – Dillian Whyte defeats Joseph Parker by unanimous decision
  - Derek Chisora defeats Carlos Takam by 8th-round TKO
  - Katie Taylor defeats Kimberly Connor by 3rd-round TKO

==== August ====
- August 4 – Eleider Álvarez defeats Sergey Kovalev to win the WBO light-heavyweight title
- August 18 – Carl Frampton defeats Luke Jackson by 9th-round TKO
  - Tyson Fury defeats Francesco Pianeta by unanimous decision

==== September ====
- September 15 – Canelo Álvarez defeats Gennady Golovkin by majority decision in a rematch to win the WBO and WBC middleweight titles. The bout would be voted Fight of the Year by Ring magazine.
- September 22 – Anthony Joshua defeats Alexander Povetkin by TKO in the seventh round.
- September 28 – Callum Smith defeats George Groves by 7th-round TKO to win the WBA and the vacant The Ring super middleweight titles in the final of World Boxing Super Series

==== October ====
- October 6 – Nicola Adams defeats Isabel Millan by unanimous decision to win the interim WBO flyweight title
- October 6 – Artur Beterbiev defeats Callum Johnson by 4th round stoppage to retain the IBF light heavyweight title
- October 7 – In the first quarter final of the 2018–19 bantamweight WBSS Naoya Inoue defeats Juan Carlos Payano by 1st-round KO
- October 7 – In the first quarter final of the 2018–19 super lightweight WBSS Kiryl Relikh defeats Eduard Troyanovsky by unanimous decision to retain the WBA Super lightweight title
- October 13 – Zolani Tete defeats Mikhail Aloyan by unanimous decision to retain WBO bantamweight title in a WBSS quarter final
- October 13 – In the first quarter final of the 2018–20 cruiserweight WBSS Andrew Tabiti defeats Ruslan Fayfer by unanimous decision
- October 13 – Terence Crawford defeats José Benavidez Jr. by 12th-round KO
- October 20 – Demetrius Andrade defeats Walter Kautondokwa by unanimous decision to win vacant WBO world middleweight title
- October 20 – Tevin Farmer defeats James Tennyson by fifth-round stoppage to retain the IBF super-featherweight title
- October 20 – Katie Taylor defeats Cindy Serrano by unanimous decision
- October 20 – Emmanuel Rodríguez defeats Jason Moloney by split decision in a WBSS quarter final
- October 20 – Yuniel Dorticos defeats Mateusz Masternak by unanimous decision in a WBSS quarter final
- October 27 – Kubrat Pulev defeats Hughie Fury by unanimous decision in an IBF heavyweight "final" eliminator
- October 27 – Daniel Jacobs defeats Sergey Derevyanchenko by split decision to win the vacant IBF world middleweight title
- October 27 – Regis Prograis defeats Terry Flanagan by unanimous decision in a 2018–19 super lightweight WBSS quarter final
- October 27 – Ivan Baranchyk defeats Anthony Yigit by a 7th round retirement to win the vacant IBF world super-lightweight title in a 2018–19 super lightweight WBSS quarter final

==== November ====
- November 3 – Josh Taylor defeats Ryan Martin by 7th-round TKO in a 2018–19 super lightweight WBSS quarter final
- November 3 – Nonito Donaire defeats Ryan Burnett by fourth-round retirement to win the WBA bantamweight title in a WBSS quarter final
- November 10 – Oleksandr Usyk defeats Tony Bellew by 8th-round KO to defend the undisputed cruiserweight title. Bellew would retire immediately after the bout.
- November 10 – Mairis Briedis defeats Noel Mikaelian by unanimous decision in a WBSS quarter final
- November 10 – Krzysztof Glowacki defeats Maksim Vlasov by unanimous decision in a WBSS quarter final
- November 17 – Claressa Shields defeats Hannah Rankin by unanimous decision to retain the IBF, WBA and win the vacant WBC middleweight titles

==== December ====
- December 1 – The highly anticipated match between Deontay Wilder and Tyson Fury ends in a draw.
- December 1 – Jarrett Hurd defeats Jason Welborn by 4th-round KO
- December 8 – Vasiliy Lomachenko defeats José Pedraza by unanimous decision to unify the WBA, WBO and The Ring lightweight titles
- December 8 – Emanuel Navarrete defeats Isaac Dogboe by unanimous decision to win the WBO super bantamweight title
- December 15 – Canelo Álvarez defeats Rocky Fielding by 3rd-round TKO
- December 15 – Katie Taylor defeats Eva Wahlström by unanimous decision
- December 22 – Dillian Whyte defeats Derek Chisora by 11th-round KO
- December 22 – Josh Warrington defeats Carl Frampton by unanimous decision
- December 22 – Tony Harrison defeats Jermell Charlo by unanimous decision to win the WBC super-welterweight title

=== 2019 ===
==== January ====
- January 13 – Caleb Plant defeats José Uzcátegui by unanimous decision to win the IBF super-middleweight title
- January 18 – Demetrius Andrade defeats Artur Akavov by 12th-round TKO
- January 18 – Amanda Serrano defeats Eva Voraberger by 1st-round KO to win the vacant WBO junior bantamweight title
- January 19 – Manny Pacquiao defeats Adrien Broner by unanimous decision.

==== February ====
- February 2 – Sergey Kovalev defeats Eleider Álvarez to regain the WBO light-heavyweight title in their rematch
- February 9 – Gervonta Davis defeats Hugo Ruiz by 1st-round KO to retain WBA super-featherweight title
- February 10 – José Ramírez defeats Jose Zepeda by majority decision to retain the WBC super-lightweight title
- February 23 – Chris Eubank Jr. defeats James DeGale by unanimous decision, DeGale would retire 5 days later.
- February 23 – Anthony Dirrell beat Avni Yildirim by technical split decision to win the vacant WBC super-middleweight title

==== March ====
- March 9 – Shawn Porter defeats Yordenis Ugás by split decision
- March 9 – Dmitry Bivol defeats Joe Smith Jr. by unanimous decision
  - Maurice Hooker defeats Mikkel LesPierre by unanimous decision
- March 15 – Katie Taylor defeats Rose Volante by a ninth-round TKO to unify the WBA, IBF and WBO lightweight titles
- March 16 – Welterweight champion Errol Spence Jr. defeats lightweight champion Mikey Garcia by unanimous decision.

==== April ====
- April 12 – Vasiliy Lomachenko defeats Anthony Crolla by 4th-round KO to retain the WBA, WBO and The Ring lightweight titles
- April 13 – Claressa Shields defeats Christina Hammer by unanimous decision to become the Undisputed middleweight champion
- April 20 – Terence Crawford defeats Amir Khan by 6th-round TKO to retain the WBO welterweight title
- April 27 – In the first semi-final of the WBSS Super lightweight division Regis Prograis defeats Kiryl Relikh by 6th-round TKO
- April 27 – In the first semi-final of the WBSS Bantamweight division Nonito Donaire defeats late replacement Stephon Young by 6th-round KO

==== May ====
- May 4 – Canelo Álvarez defeats Daniel Jacobs to unify the WBA, WBC, IBF, The Ring and TBRB middleweight titles
- May 4 – Artur Beterbiev defeats Radivoje Kalajdzic by fifth-round TKO
- May 11 – 7 to 1 underdog Julian Williams defeats Jarrett Hurd to win the WBA, IBF and IBO light middleweight titles
- May 18 – Josh Taylor defeats Ivan Baranchyk by unanimous decision to win IBF super lightweight title, in a WBSS Super lightweight division semi final
- May 18 – Naoya Inoue defeats Emmanuel Rodríguez by second-round knockout to win the IBF and the vacant The Ring bantamweight titles, in a WBSS Bantamweight division semi final
- May 18 – Deontay Wilder defeats Dominic Breazeale by 1st-round KO
- May 25 – Jessica McCaskill defeats Anahí Ester Sánchez by unanimous decision to unify the WBC & WBA super-lightweight titles

==== June ====
- June 1 – Late replacement Andy Ruiz Jr. upset undefeated Anthony Joshua at the Madison Square Garden, and became the new unified heavyweight champion.
- June 1 – Katie Taylor beat Delfine Persoon by majority decision to become the Undisputed lightweight champion.
- June 15 – In the first semi-final of the WBSS cruiserweight division Mairis Briedis defeats Krzysztof Głowacki by third-round TKO to win the WBO cruiserweight title
- June 15 – Yuniel Dorticos defeats Andrew Tabiti by 10th-round KO to win the vacant IBF cruiserweight title, in a WBSS cruiserweight division semi final
- June 15 – Josh Warrington defeats Kid Galahad by split decision to retain the IBF featherweight title
- June 15 – Tyson Fury defeats Tom Schwarz by 2nd-round TKO to retain the Lineal and The Ring heavyweight titles

==== July ====
- July 13 – Daniel Dubois defeats Nathan Gorman by 5th-round TKO to win the vacant British heavyweight title
- July 13 – Joe Joyce defeats Bryant Jennings by unanimous decision
- July 20 – Dillian Whyte defeats Óscar Rivas by unanimous decision.
- July 20 – Manny Pacquiao beats Keith Thurman by split decision at the MGM Grand Garden Arena to win the WBA welterweight title, becoming the oldest welterweight champion in boxing history at the age of 40.
- July 27 – José Ramírez defeats Maurice Hooker by 6th-round TKO to unify the WBC and WBO super-lightweight titles

==== August ====
- August 24 – Sergey Kovalev defeats Anthony Yarde by 11th-round KO
- August 31 – Vasiliy Lomachenko defeats Luke Campbell by unanimous decision.

==== September ====
- September 14 – Tyson Fury defeats Otto Wallin by unanimous decision
- September 28 – Errol Spence Jr. defeats Shawn Porter by split decision to unify WBC and IBF welterweight titles
- September 28 – David Benavidez defeats Anthony Dirrell by 9th-round TKO to regain the WBC super middleweight title

==== October ====
- October 5 – Gennady Golovkin defeats Sergiy Derevyanchenko by unanimous decision to win the vacant IBF & IBO middleweight titles
- October 12 – Dmitry Bivol beat Lenin Castillo by unanimous decision
- October 12 – Former undisputed cruiserweight Oleksandr Usyk made his heavyweight debut defeating Chazz Witherspoon by 7th round retirement
- October 18 – Artur Beterbiev defeats Oleksandr Gvozdyk by 10th-round TKO to unify the WBC & IBF light heavyweight titles
- October 26 – Josh Taylor defeats Regis Prograis to unify WBA, IBF and vacant The Ring light-welterweight titles in the final of WBSS Super lightweight division
- October 26 – Shakur Stevenson defeats Joet Gonzalez by unanimous decision to win the WBO featherweight title

==== November ====
- November 2 – Anthony Crolla retired following a majority decision victory over Frank Urquiaga
- November 2 – Katie Taylor defeats Christina Linardatou by unanimous decision to win the WBO super-lightweight title, becoming a 2 division world champion
- November 2 – Canelo Álvarez defeats Sergey Kovalev 11th-round KO to win the WBO light heavyweight title, becoming a 3-division world champion
- November 7 – Naoya Inoue defeats Nonito Donaire to win World Boxing Super Series and to unify the WBA, IBF, and The Ring bantamweight titles. It would also be voted Fight of the Year by Ring magazine.
- November 23 – Callum Smith defeats John Ryder by somewhat controversial unanimous decision to retain the WBA super-middleweight title
- November 23 – Deontay Wilder defeats Luis Ortiz by 7th-round KO
- November 30 – Cecilia Braekhus defeats Victoria Bustos by unanimous decision to retain the Undisputed welterweight title

==== December ====
- December 7 – Anthony Joshua regains titles by beating Andy Ruiz Jr. in a rematch.
- December 7 – Jermall Charlo defeats Dennis Hogan by 6th-round KO
- December 14 – Terence Crawford defeats Egidijus Kavaliauskas by 9th-round KO
- December 14 – Teofimo Lopez defeats Richard Commey by 2nd-round KO to win the IBF lightweight title
- December 21 – Jermell Charlo defeats Tony Harrison by 11th-round TKO to regain the WBC light-middleweight title in their rematch
