= Regis Prograis vs. Josh Taylor =

Boxing match

- Date: 26 October 2019
- Venue: The O2 Arena, Greenwich, London, UK
- Title(s) on the line: WBA (Super), IBF, WBC Diamond and vacant The Ring light welterweight titles

Tale of the tape
Boxer	Regis Prograis	Josh Taylor
Nickname	"Rougarou"	"The Tartan Tornado"
Hometown	New Orleans, Louisiana, U.S.	Prestonpans, Scotland, UK
Pre-fight record	24–0 (20 KO)	15–0 (12 KO)
Age	30 years, 9 months	28 years, 9 months
Height	5 ft 8 in (173 cm)	5 ft 10 in (178 cm)
Weight	140 lb (64 kg)	139 1/2 lb (63 kg)
Style	Southpaw	Southpaw
Recognition	WBA (Super) and WBC Diamond; Light Welterweight Champion; The Ring/TBRB; No. 1 Ranked Light Welterweight	IBF; Light Welterweight Champion; The Ring; No. 2 Ranked Light Welterweight; TBRB; No. 3 Ranked Light Welterweight

Result
- Taylor wins via 12–round majority decision (114–114, 115–113, 117–112)

Regis Prograis vs. Josh Taylor, was a professional boxing match contested on 26 October 2019, for the WBA (Super), IBF and The Ring light welterweight championship. The fight was the World Boxing Super Series: light-welterweight final, with the winner receiving the Muhammad Ali Trophy. The bout took place at The O2 Arena London, with Taylor winning by majority decision.

== Background ==
On 30 June 2018, it was announced that Taylor would join the eight man tournament. It was later announced on 13 July 2018 that Prograis would also be taking part in the tournament.

Prograis defeated his quarter-final, and semi-final opponents, Terry Flanagan, and Kiryl Relikh, to win the WBA light welterweight title. Taylor defeated his quarter-final, and semi-final opponents, Ryan Martin, and Ivan Baranchyk, to win the IBF light welterweight title.

On 31 August 2019, the unification bout between Prograis and Taylor was announced to take place on 26 October at The O2 Arena on Sky Sports Box Office.

Speaking during the build up Taylor expressed confidence saying "I'm very confident that I can outbox him and outfight him as well, I'm all about my speed, reactions and timing but I punch real hard as well for someone of my size. If I hit you, you're either going down or you're going to be hurt and in trouble. So if he tries to make it a 'dog fight', tries to walk me down and drag me into a fight, he is getting chinned. I will knock him spark out. The two best lads in the division are going for it. We are both undefeated, we are both hungry, so it's going to be a real interesting fight. But I can't see anything other than a Josh Taylor win."

Prograis entered the fight as a slight favourite to win.

== Fight details ==
Taylor spend much of the bout on the front foot with Prograis using head movement to evade before attempting to land counters with both hands.

After 12 hard fought rounds, Taylor was awarded a majority decision victory with scores of 115–113, 117–112 and an even 114–114.

== Aftermath ==
Following Taylor's win, in the post-fight interview, Taylor challenged WBC and WBO light-welterweight champion José Ramírez to an undisputed title fight. Prograis expressed interest in a rematch.

== Fight card ==
Confirmed bouts:

Weight Class		vs.		Method	Round	Time	Notes
Light-welterweight	Josh Taylor (c)	def.	Regis Prograis (c)	MD	12/12		^{Note 1}
Heavyweight	Derek Chisora	def.	David Price	TKO	4/12	2:00	^{Note 2}
Lightweight	Lee Selby	def.	Ricky Burns	MD	12/12
Cruiserweight	Lawrence Okolie	def.	Yves Ngabu (c)	TKO	7/12	2:28	^{Note 3}
Welterweight	Conor Benn (c)	def.	Steve Jamoye	TKO	4/10	2:18	^{Note 4}
Preliminary bouts
Super-bantamweight	Shannon Courtenay	def.	Jasmina Nad	PTS	4/4
Light-middleweight	Abass Baraou (c)	def.	John O'Donnell	TKO	6/10	2:59	^{Note 5}
Non-TV bouts
Middleweight	Austin Williams	def.	Miroslav Juna	PTS	4/4
Light-heavyweight	Denis Radovan	def.	Luke Blackledge	RTD	4/8	3:00

^Note 1 For WBA (Super), IBF, The Ring and WBC Diamond light-welterweight titles
^Note 2 For WBO Inter-Continental heavyweight title
^Note 3 For European cruiserweight title
^Note 4 For WBA Continental welterweight title
^Note 5 For WBC International Silver light-middleweight title

== Broadcasting ==
Country	Broadcaster	
Country	PPV	Stream
United Kingdom	Sky Sports Box Office	—N/a
United States	—N/a	DAZN

Preceded by vs. Kiryl Relikh	Regis Prograis's bouts 26 October 2019	Succeeded by vs. Juan Heraldez
Preceded by vs. Ivan Baranchyk	Josh Taylor's bouts 26 October 2019	Succeeded by vs. Apinun Khongsong
