= Obara =

Obara may refer to:

== People ==
=== With the surname ===
- Daisuke Obara (born 1981), Japanese ice hockey player
- Hitomi Obara (1981–2025), Japanese sport wrestler
- Joji Obara, Korean-Japanese serial rapist
- Keita Obara, (born 1986), Japanese professional boxer
- Kuniyoshi Obara (1887–1977), Japanese educational theorist and publisher
- Maciej Obara (born 1981), Polish jazz musician, composer and bandleader
- Masakazu Obara, Japanese anime director
- Tadashi Obara (born 1983), Japanese speed skater
- Takumi Obara (born 1967), Japanese triathlete
- Yuri Obara (born 1980), Japanese speed skater
- Yuria Obara (born 1990), Japanese women's footballer

=== Fictional ===
- Obara Sand, a character in A Song of Ice and Fire
- Nne Obara, a character in Hitman (2016 video game)

== Places ==
- Obara, Aichi, Japan, a former village
- Obara Station, a train station in Misaki, Okayama, Japan
- Ōbara Station, a HRT station in Hiroshima, Japan

== Other uses ==
- Obara (stew), a Slovene national dish

== See also ==
- Obaro (disambiguation)
