= Obaro =

Obaro may refer to:

- Obaro, a leadership role in the city of Kabba, Kogi, Nigeria
- John Obaro (born 1963), Nigerian technology entrepreneur and public speaker, founder of SystemSpecs

== See also ==
- Obara (disambiguation)
