= Eduard Troyanovsky =

Russian boxer

Eduard Troyanovsky Эдуард Трояновский
Personal information
- Nicknames: The Eagle; Troya
- Nationality: Russian
- Born: Eduard Valentinovich Troyanovsky; 30 May 1980 (age 46) Omsk, Russian SFSR, Soviet Union
- Height: 1.73 m (5 ft 8 in)
- Weight: Lightweight; Light welterweight

Boxing career
- Reach: 175 cm (69 in)
- Stance: Orthodox

Boxing record
- Total fights: 32
- Wins: 29
- Win by KO: 24
- Losses: 3

Eduard Valentinovich Troyanovsky (Russian: Эдуард Валентинович Трояновский; born 30 May 1980) is a Russian professional boxer who held the IBF and IBO light-welterweight titles from 2015 to 2016.

== Professional career ==
=== Troyanovsky vs. Zwarg ===
Troyanovsky made his professional debut on 28 November 2009, winning a four-round points decision over Richard Zwarg.

Fighting in Germany and Russia for the next six years, Troyanovsky won 19 fights in a row, most of them by knockout.

=== Troyanovsky vs. Shakhanzaryan ===
On 10 April 2015, he knocked out Aik Shakhnazaryan in eight rounds to win the vacant IBO light-welterweight title.

=== Troyanovsky vs. Cuenca I & II ===
Later that year, on 4 November 2015, Troyanovsky won the IBF light-welterweight title by stopping César Cuenca in the sixth round. He successfully defended both titles in a rematch against Cuenca on 8 April 2016, this time stopping him in seven rounds.

=== Troyanovsky vs. Obara ===
A second defence of the titles came in spectacular style on 9 September 2016, which saw Troyanovsky launch Keita Obara through the ring ropes in round two, and ultimately finish the fight with further unanswered punches when Obara climbed back in to resume.

=== Troyanovsky vs. Indongo ===
On 3 December 2016, Troyanovsky suffered his first career loss in a major upset, after Julius Indongo knocked him out cold in the first round.

=== Troyanovsky vs. Relikh ===
On october 7, 2018, Troyanovsky fought Kiryl Relikh for the WBA super lightweight title. Relikh defeated Troyanovsky by a slight margin, winning 115-113 on all three scorecards.

=== Troyanovsky vs. Zahradnik ===
In his next bout, Troyanovsky secured a wide unanimous decision win against a durable Josef Zahradnik, 100-90, 99-91 and 98-92 on the scorecards.

== Professional boxing record ==
32 fights	29 wins	3 losses
By knockout	24	1
By decision	5	2

No.	Result	Record	Opponent	Type	Round, time	Date	Location	Notes
32	Loss	29−3	Valery Oganisyan	UD	10	2 Apr 2021	USC Soviet Wings, Moscow, Russia	For vacant WBC–CISBB light-welterweight title
31	Win	29−2	Renald Garrido	MD	10	15 Oct 2020	Falcon Club, Minsk, Belarus	
30	Win	28−2	Josef Zahradnik	UD	10	14 Nov 2019	Hotel Azimut, Saint Petersburg, Russia	Won vacant EBP light-welterweight title
29	Loss	27−2	Kiryl Relikh	UD	12	7 Oct 2018	Yokohama Arena, Yokohama, Japan	For WBA light-welterweight title; World Boxing Super Series: light-welterweight quarter-final
28	Win	27–1	Carlos Manuel Portillo	KO	1 (12), 2:13	27 Nov 2017	Luzhniki Palace of Sports, Moscow, Russia	
27	Win	26–1	Michele di Rocco	TKO	4 (10), 2:18	1 Jul 2017	Luzhniki Palace of Sports, Moscow, Russia	
26	Loss	25–1	Julius Indongo	KO	1 (12), 0:40	3 Dec 2016	Megasport Arena, Moscow, Russia	Lost IBF and IBO light-welterweight titles
25	Win	25–0	Keita Obara	TKO	2 (12), 1:35	9 Sep 2016	Soviet Wings Sport Palace, Moscow, Russia	Retained IBF and IBO light-welterweight titles
24	Win	24–0	César Cuenca	TKO	7 (12), 2:14	8 Apr 2016	Soviet Wings Sport Palace, Moscow, Russia	Retained IBF and IBO light-welterweight titles
23	Win	23–0	César Cuenca	TKO	6 (12), 2:44	4 Nov 2015	TatNeft Arena, Kazan, Russia	Retained IBO light-welterweight title; Won IBF light-welterweight title
22	Win	22–0	Ronald Pontillas	KO	3 (10), 1:55	22 Jun 2015	Boxing & Gym Academy, Moscow, Russia	
21	Win	21–0	Aik Shakhnazaryan	TKO	8 (12), 0:57	10 Apr 2015	Luzhniki Stadium, Moscow, Russia	Won vacant IBO light-welterweight title
20	Win	20–0	Jose Agustin Feria	KO	1 (12), 2:52	28 Nov 2014	Luzhniki Stadium, Moscow, Russia	Won vacant WBA Inter-Continental light-welterweight title
19	Win	19–0	Jose Alfaro	TKO	5 (12), 0:32	24 Oct 2014	Luzhniki Stadium, Moscow, Russia	Won vacant WBA International lightweight title
18	Win	18–0	Anton Bekish	TKO	4 (10), 0:48	30 May 2014	Luzhniki Stadium, Moscow, Russia	
17	Win	17–0	Allan Kamote	TKO	2 (8), 2:47	21 Dec 2013	Dynamo Sports Palace, Moscow, Russia	
16	Win	16–0	Michael Odhiambo	KO	2 (10), 2:59	15 Nov 2013	Sport Palace, Barnaul, Russia	
15	Win	15–0	Luis Zambrano	KO	2 (12), 0:34	17 May 2013	Crocus City Hall, Krasnogorsk, Russia	Retained PABA lightweight title
14	Win	14–0	Orlen Padilla	TKO	2 (12), 0:45	8 Mar 2013	Soviet Wings Sport Palace, Moscow, Russia	Retained PABA lightweight title
13	Win	13–0	Walter Estrada	TKO	2 (12), 2:58	7 Dec 2012	Crocus City Hall, Krasnogorsk, Russia	Retained PABA lightweight title
12	Win	12–0	Joseph Von Minoza	RTD	7 (12), 3:00	18 Sep 2012	Varshavka Sky, Moscow, Russia	Won vacant PABA lightweight title
11	Win	11–0	Claudinei Lacerda	TKO	10 (10), 2:53	20 Jun 2012	Arena CSKA, Moscow, Russia	
10	Win	10–0	Yauheni Kruhlik	UD	6	4 Apr 2012	Crocus City Hall, Krasnogorsk, Russia	
9	Win	9–0	Matt Zegan	TKO	3 (12), 2:59	4 Dec 2010	Sport- und Kongresshalle, Schwerin, Germany	Won WBO European lightweight title
8	Win	8–0	Jan Balog	TKO	4 (8)	9 Oct 2010	KSC Box-Halle, Halle, Germany	
7	Win	7–0	Maurycy Gojko	TKO	1 (6)	11 Sep 2010	Bitterfeld, Germany	
6	Win	6–0	Peter Chobanov	TKO	2 (6)	14 Aug 2010	KSC Fight Club, Halle, Germany	
5	Win	5–0	Suleyman Dag	TKO	2 (6)	26 Jun 2010	KSC Fight Club, Halle, Germany	
4	Win	4–0	Mirko Penz	TKO	1 (6), 1:55	5 Jun 2010	Sporthalle Brandberge, Halle, Germany	
3	Win	3–0	Tomas Freitag	PTS	4	19 May 2010	KSC-Sporthalle, Halle, Germany	
2	Win	2–0	Issa El Sleiman	TKO	1 (4)	4 Dec 2009	Sporthalle Brandberge, Halle, Germany	
1	Win	1–0	Richard Zwarg	PTS	4	28 Nov 2009	KSC-Sporthalle, Halle, Germany	

Sporting positions
Regional boxing titles
Preceded by Matt Zegan	WBO European lightweight champion 4 December 2010 – July 2012; Vacated	Vacant Title next held by Liam Walsh
Vacant Title last held by Azad Azizov	PABA lightweight champion 18 September 2012 – November 2013; Vacated	Vacant Title next held by Roman Andreev
Vacant Title last held by Bahodir Mamadjonov	WBA International lightweight champion 24 October 2014 – November 2014; Vacated	Vacant Title next held by Emmanuel Tagoe
Vacant Title last held by Paul McCloskey	WBA Inter-Continental light-welterweight champion 28 November 2014 – April 2015; Vacated	Vacant Title next held by Kiryl Relikh
Minor world boxing titles
Vacant Title last held by Jessie Vargas	IBO light-welterweight champion 10 April 2015 – 3 December 2016	Succeeded by Julius Indongo
Major world boxing titles
Preceded by César Cuenca	IBF light-welterweight champion 4 November 2015 – 3 December 2016	Succeeded by Julius Indongo
