= Regis Prograis =

American boxer (born 1989)

Personal information
- Nickname: Rougarou
- Born: January 24, 1989 (age 37) New Orleans, Louisiana, U.S.
- Height: 5 ft 8 in (173 cm)
- Weight: Light welterweight

Boxing career
- Reach: 67 in (170 cm)
- Stance: Southpaw

Boxing record
- Total fights: 34
- Wins: 30
- Win by KO: 24
- Losses: 4

Regis Prograis (/ˈriːdʒɪs ˈproʊɡreɪ/ REE-jiss PROH-gray; born January 24, 1989) is an American former professional boxer who competed from 2012 to 2026. He held the World Boxing Association (WBA) super lightweight title in 2019, and the World Boxing Council (WBC) super lightweight title from 2022 to 2023.

Prograis chose his nickname, "Rougarou", Louisiana French for 'werewolf', to pay homage to his grandfather, who is of Native American descent.

== Amateur career ==
Prograis is of Louisiana Creole descent and originally from New Orleans. Hurricane Katrina forced him to relocate in 2005 to Houston, Texas, where he began training at Savannah Boxing Club alongside Evander Holyfield which was a key factor in motivating him to take boxing seriously. He went on to build an 87–7 amateur record. As an amateur, Prograis was ranked #4 in the United States, the 2009 Ringside World Champion, 2010 HORN National Champion, won regional Golden Gloves and competed in the 2012 Olympic Trials before turning professional in 2012.

== Professional career ==
=== Early career ===
Since turning professional, Prograis has fought at Barclays Center in Brooklyn, New York, on the undercard of the Keith Thurman vs. Shawn Porter fight, which was the first primetime boxing event televised on CBS in over 40 years. In 2015, he was recognized by ESPN as a Prospect of the Year candidate. USA Today and Yahoo Sports has recognized Prograis as a legitimate world title contender. Regis is represented by the boxing promoter Lou DiBella.

=== World Boxing Super Series ===
==== Prograis vs. Flanagan ====
On July 13, 2018, it was announced that Prograis would be one of eight boxers taking part in the light welterweight World Boxing Super Series. As the top seeded fighter, he was able to choose the former WBO lightweight champion Terry Flanagan as his first opponent. The opening bout of the tournament took place at the Lakefront Arena in New Orleans, Louisiana on October 27, 2018. Prograis won the fight by unanimous decision, with scores of 117–110, 118–109 and 119–108. He dropped Flannagan with a hook in the eighth round, in what was the sole knockdown of the fight.

=== WBA light welterweight champion ===
==== Prograis vs. Relikh ====
Prograis faced the WBA super lightweight champion Kiryl Relikh in the tournament semifinals, which took place at the Cajundome in Lafayette, Louisiana on April 27, 2019. Relikh had earned his place in the penultimate bout of the tournament with a unanimous decision victory over Eduard Troyanovsky in the quarterfinals. Despite being the champion, Relikh entered as a sizable +700 underdog, while most odds-makers had Prograis as a -1000 favorite. He justified his role as the favorite and won the fight by a sixth-round knockout. Prograis had won every single round of the contest up to that point, with all three judges having him up 50–44 at the time of the stoppage.

==== Prograis vs. Josh Taylor ====
In the final, which took place on October 26, 2019, at The O2 Arena in London, England, Prograis faced the IBF and The Ring super lightweight champion Josh Taylor. Predictions before the fight were split, since both fighters had an undefeated professional record and were world champions in their prime. Prograis entered the fight as a slight favorite, with most betting lines having him between -152 and -189, while Taylor was listed as a between +130 to a +140 underdog. Taylor won the fight by majority decision. Two judges ultimately scored it 117–112 and 115–113 in favor of the Scottsman, while the sole remaining judge had it scored as a 114–114 draw.

=== WBC light welterweight champion ===
Prograis faced the unbeaten Juan Heraldez on October 31, 2020, on the undercard of the Gervonta Davis and Leo Santa Cruz Showtime pay-per-view. He won the fight by a third-round technical knockout. Prograis dropped his opponent with a straight left early in the final round of the bout and finished him with a flurry of punches at the 1:23 minute mark. Prograis faced Ivan Redkach on the undercard of Jake Paul vs. Ben Askren on April 17, 2021. The fight was stopped in the sixth round, due to an accidental low blow that rendered Redkach unable to continue competing. Prograis won by technical decision, with two scorecards of 60–54 and one scorecard of 59–54. The result was immediately overturned however, as Georgia regulations state that a boxer who is unable to continue after being hit with an unintentional low blow shall be declared the loser by a technical knockout. His third and final non-title bout, before making his second attempt at a world title, took place on March 19, 2022, against Tyrone McKenna. Prograis won the fight by a sixth-round technical knockout.

==== Prograis vs. Zepeda ====
On July 22, 2022, the WBC light welterweight mandatory title challenger Jose Ramirez was ordered to face the sanctioning body's second ranked contender Jose Zepeda for the vacant championship. Ramirez withdrew from the negotiations on August 1, because of a conflict with his wedding in October, and was replaced by Prograis. As they failed to reach an agreement within the 30-day negotiation period, a purse bid was called, which was won by the recently formed promotional company MarvNation with a bid of $2.4 million. The vacant title bout took place at the Dignity Health Sports Park in Carson, California and was broadcast as a pay-per-view. Prograis won the fight by an eleventh-round knockout. He was up 98–92, 98–92 and 97–93 at the time of the stoppage. The newly crowned champion had out-landed Zepeda 156 to 66 in total punches and 75 to 31 in power punches. Both fighters earned a guaranteed $1,080,000, with Prograis earning an additional $240,000 bonus.

==== Prograis vs. Zorrilla ====
Prograis was expected to make his first WBC light welterweight title defense against Liam Paro in the main event of a DAZN broadcast card, which will take place on June 17, 2023, at the Smoothie King Center in New Orleans, Louisiana. Paro withdrew from the fight due to an injury on May 18. He was replaced by the once-defeated Danielito Zorrilla. Prograis retained the title by split decision. Judges Ray Corona and Robert Tapper scored the bout 117–110 and 118–109 in his favor respectively, while judge Craig Metcalfe scored it 114–113 for Zorilla. He was able to knock the challenger down with a left a minute into the third round, although he was unable to finish him.

==== Prograis vs. Haney ====
On July 28, 2023, ESPN reported that Prograis would make his second WBC title defense against then-undisputed lightweight world champion Devin Haney. The WBC granted them permission to pursue the fight on August 1, 2023, although the sanctioning body's Board of Governors was split in their vote. On September 26, 2023, the fight was officially announced for December 10, 2023, at the Chase Center in San Francisco, California. Prograis lost to Haney by unanimous decision, after being knocked down in the third round.

==== Prograis vs. Catterall ====
Regis Prograis was scheduled to face Jack Catterall in a 12-round junior welterweight bout at Co-op Live Arena in Manchester, England on August 24, 2024. The contest was postponed after Catterall suffered an injury and instead took place on 26 October 2024 at the same venue. Prograis lost the fight by unanimous decision.

==== Prograis vs. Duarte ====
Prograis was scheduled to face Oscar Duarte at Honda Center in Anaheim, CA on February 15, 2025.

==== Prograis vs. Diaz ====
On August 2, 2025, in Chicago, Prograis bagged his first win since 2023 against former world champion Joseph Diaz by unanimous decision with the judges scoring it 98–92, 96–94 and 96–94.

==== Prograis vs. Benn ====
Prograis was defeated by Conor Benn at the Tottenham Hotspur Stadium in London on 11 April 2026 as the co-main event of Tyson Fury vs. Arslanbek Makhmudov, broadcast on Netflix. The fight was contested at a 150 lb catchweight limit, with Benn weighing in at 149.5 lbs, and Prograis weighing in lighter at 148.1 lbs. Benn won by unanimous decision.

=== Retirement ===
After the loss to Benn, Prograis announced his retirement from boxing. Less than a week later, Prograis made a U-turn and said he may return to boxing in a couple of years when he turned 40, but would not be competing at super lightweight.

== Professional boxing record ==
34 fights	30 wins	4 losses
By knockout	24	0
By decision	6	4

No.	Result	Record	Opponent	Type	Round, time	Date	Location	Notes
34	Loss	30–4	Conor Benn	UD	10	Apr 11, 2026	Tottenham Hotspur Stadium, London, England	
33	Win	30–3	Joseph Diaz	UD	10	Aug 2, 2025	Credit Union 1 Arena, Chicago, Illinois	
32	Loss	29–3	Jack Catterall	UD	12	Oct 26, 2024	Co-op Live, Manchester, England	For vacant WBO International light welterweight title
31	Loss	29–2	Devin Haney	UD	12	Dec 9, 2023	Chase Center, San Francisco, California, U.S.	Lost WBC light welterweight title
30	Win	29–1	Danielito Zorrilla	SD	12	Jun 17, 2023	Smoothie King Center, New Orleans, Louisiana, U.S.	Retained WBC light welterweight title
29	Win	28–1	Jose Zepeda	KO	11 (12), 0:59	Nov 26, 2022	Dignity Health Sports Park, Carson, California, U.S.	Won vacant WBC light welterweight title
28	Win	27–1	Tyrone McKenna	TKO	6 (10), 1:40	Mar 19, 2022	Aviation Club Tennis Centre, Dubai, United Arab Emirates	
27	Win	26–1	Ivan Redkach	TKO	6 (10), 1:21	Apr 17, 2021	Mercedes-Benz Stadium, Atlanta, Georgia, U.S.	Originally unanimous TD, later ruled TKO after an incorrect referee call
26	Win	25–1	Juan Heraldez	TKO	3 (10), 1:23	Oct 31, 2020	Alamodome, San Antonio, Texas, U.S.	
25	Loss	24–1	Josh Taylor	MD	12	Oct 26, 2019	The O2 Arena, London, England	Lost WBA light welterweight title; For IBF and vacant The Ring light welterweight titles; World Boxing Super Series: light welterweight final
24	Win	24–0	Kiryl Relikh	TKO	6 (12), 1:36	Apr 27, 2019	Cajundome, Lafayette, Louisiana, U.S.	Won WBA light welterweight title; World Boxing Super Series: light welterweight semi-final
23	Win	23–0	Terry Flanagan	UD	12	Oct 27, 2018	Lakefront Arena, New Orleans, Louisiana, U.S.	World Boxing Super Series: light welterweight quarter-final
22	Win	22–0	Juan Jose Velasco	TKO	8 (12), 1:59	Jul 14, 2018	Lakefront Arena, New Orleans, Louisiana, U.S.	
21	Win	21–0	Julius Indongo	TKO	2 (12), 2:54	Mar 9, 2018	Mountain Grand, Deadwood, South Dakota, U.S.	Won vacant WBC interim light welterweight title
20	Win	20–0	Joel Díaz Jr.	TKO	2 (10), 2:55	Jun 9, 2017	Turning Stone Resort Casino, Verona, New York, U.S.	Retained NABF light welterweight title
19	Win	19–0	Wilfredo Buelcas	KO	1 (10), 2:07	Feb 11, 2017	Hard Rock Hotel and Casino, Biloxi, Mississippi, U.S.	Retained NABF light welterweight title
18	Win	18–0	Luis Eduardo Florez	TKO	4 (10), 1:47	Jun 25, 2016	Barclays Center, New York City, New York, U.S.	Won vacant NABF light welterweight title
17	Win	17–0	Aaron Herrera	KO	1 (10), 2:17	Mar 25, 2016	Buffalo Run Casino, Miami, Oklahoma, U.S.	
16	Win	16–0	Abel Ramos	RTD	8 (10), 3:00	Dec 11, 2015	Bayou City Event Center, Houston, Texas, U.S.	Won vacant NABF Junior light welterweight title
15	Win	15–0	Amos Cowart	UD	8	Aug 7, 2015	Bally's, Atlantic City, New Jersey, U.S.	
14	Win	14–0	Abraham Alvarez	TKO	1 (6), 1:28	Apr 17, 2015	Mohegan Sun Arena, Montville, Connecticut, U.S.	
13	Win	13–0	Héctor Velázquez	TKO	5 (8), 2:59	Jan 9, 2015	Morongo Casino, Cabazon, California, U.S.	
12	Win	12–0	Jeff Humphries	KO	1 (6), 1:43	Nov 6, 2014	Evangeline Downs, Opelousas, Louisiana, U.S.	
11	Win	11–0	Mario Hermosillo	TKO	4 (6), 1:24	Oct 8, 2014	Beau Rivage, Biloxi, Mississippi, U.S.	
10	Win	10–0	Marteze Logan	TKO	2 (4), 0:31	Jun 27, 2014	Athletic Fencing Center, Houston, Texas, U.S.	
9	Win	9–0	Aaron Anderson	TKO	5 (6)	Jun 7, 2014	Jackson County Civic Centre, Pascagoula, Mississippi, U.S.	
8	Win	8–0	Felipe Reyes	TKO	6 (6), 2:45	Apr 24, 2014	Hilton Anatole, Dallas, Texas, U.S.	
7	Win	7–0	Miguel Alvarez	TKO	3 (4), 2:59	Nov 30, 2013	Belle of Baton Rouge, Baton Rouge, Louisiana, U.S.	
6	Win	6–0	James Harrison	UD	6	Oct 3, 2013	Heritage Festival, Gretna, Louisiana, U.S.	
5	Win	5–0	Adauto Gonzalez	UD	4	Jun 6, 2013	Landmark Hotel, Metairie, Louisiana, U.S.	
4	Win	4–0	David Green	TKO	2 (4), 2:59	Jan 10, 2013	Bayou Event Center, Houston, Texas, U.S.	
3	Win	3–0	Anthony Little	TKO	2 (4), 2:19	Nov 30, 2012	Conference Centre, Hurst, Texas, U.S.	
2	Win	2–0	Aaron Anderson	KO	4 (4) 2:20	Aug 25, 2012	Charles T. Doyle Convention Center, Texas City, Texas, U.S.	
1	Win	1–0	Carl Almirol	KO	1 (4), 2:01	Apr 28, 2012	The Royal Palace, Houston, Texas, U.S.	

== Titles in boxing ==
=== Major world titles ===
- WBA light welterweight champion (140 lbs)
- WBC light welterweight champion (140 lbs)

=== Interim world titles ===
- WBC interim light welterweight champion (140 lbs)

=== Regional/International titles ===
- NABF light welterweight champion (140 lbs)
- NABF Junior light welterweight champion (140 lbs)

=== Honorary titles ===
- WBC Diamond light welterweight champion

== See also ==
- List of world light-welterweight boxing champions

Sporting positions
Regional boxing titles
Vacant Title last held by Giovani Santillan	NABF super lightweight champion Junior title December 11, 2015 – June 2016; Vacated	Vacant Title next held by Yves Ulysse Jr.
Vacant Title last held by Rashad Ganaway	NABF super lightweight champion June 25, 2016 – 2018; Vacated	Vacant Title next held by Maxim Dadashev
Major world boxing titles
Vacant Title last held by Lucas Matthysse	WBC super lightweight champion Interim title March 9, 2018 – July 14, 2018; Status changed	Vacant
Preceded by Kiryl Relikh	WBA super lightweight champion April 27, 2019 – October 26, 2019; Failed to win Super title	Vacant Title next held by Alberto Puello
Vacant Title last held by Josh Taylor	WBC super lightweight champion November 26, 2022 – December 9, 2023	Succeeded by Devin Haney
CompuBox records
Preceded by Edwin De Los Santos vs. Shakur Stevenson	Least punches landed in a 12-round bout 36; December 9, 2023 – present	Incumbent
