= Terry Flanagan (boxer) =

British boxer (born 1989)

Personal information
- Nickname: Turbo
- Nationality: British
- Born: 11 June 1989 (age 37) Manchester, England
- Height: 5 ft 9 1/2 in (177 cm)
- Weight: Super-featherweight; Lightweight; Light-welterweight

Boxing career
- Reach: 71 in (180 cm)
- Stance: Southpaw

Boxing record
- Total fights: 38
- Wins: 36
- Win by KO: 14
- Losses: 2

Terry Flanagan (born 11 June 1989) is a British former professional boxer. He held the WBO lightweight title from 2015 to 2017, becoming the first Englishman to win a world title in that weight class. He won the Prizefighter lightweight tournament in 2012, held the British lightweight title in 2014, and has challenged once for the WBO light-welterweight title in 2018.

== Professional career ==
=== Super-featherweight ===
From Ancoats, Manchester, Flanagan had his first professional fight in 2009, beating Danny McDermid on points. After winning his first 12 fights between 2009 and 2012, he beat Dougie Curran in May 2012 to take the vacant English super featherweight title. This was the second time the two had fought, previously meeting in 2010. Curran entered with a record of 0–6–1 in his previous seven bouts. Flanagan had one point deducted for holding in the 5th round. The judges, after 10 rounds scored the bout (99–90, 99–91 twice). He successfully defended the title four months later against Troy James on points (99–92, 99–93, 98–94).

=== Lightweight ===
==== Prizefighter tournament ====
Flanagan took part in the Prizefighter Series: The Lightweights II at the Olympia in Liverpool on 6 October 2012. In the quarter-finals, Flanagan defeated Patrick Walsh (10–1, 3 KOs) via unanimous decision 29–28 on all three judges cards. In the semi-finals, Flanagan knocked down Derry Mathews (30–7–1, 16 KOs) in round 2, winning the fight via decision 29–27 on all scorecards. Flanagan went on to win the prizefighter tournament in the final defeating Gary Sykes (20–2, 5 KOs) via split decision (29–28, 29–28, 28–29).

In April 2013, on the undercard of Khan-Diaz at Sheffield Arena in Sheffield, Flanagan fought and defeated former unified World Lightweight champion Nate Campbell (36–10–1, 26 KOs). Campbell retired on his stool at the end of round 4 with an injured right hand.

On 26 July 2014, Flanagan claimed the vacant BBBofC British lightweight title by defeating British boxer Martin Gethin (24–5–1, 11 KOs). Gethin did not come out for round 8 after his right ear was badly swollen.

Flanagan challenged WBO European lightweight champion Stephen Ormond (17–1, 8 KOs) on 14 February 2015 at the Civic Hall in Wolverhampton, United Kingdom. In round 9, Ormond was deducted a point for use of the head, and ultimately disqualified in round 10 for persistent use of the head, thus losing his belt in the process. At the time of disqualification, Flanagan was heading towards a unanimous decision win (88–82, 88–82, 88–82). The win ensured Flanagan would next fight for the WBO world title next. Possible opponents were Juan Diaz or Takahiro Ao.

==== Flanagan vs. Zepeda ====
After claiming the WBO European title, Flanagan stepped up to challenge unbeaten American Jose Zepeda (23-0, 20 KOs) for the vacant WBO lightweight title. The title was left vacant by Terrence Crawford, after he moved up weight class. The fight took place at the Velodrome in Manchester on 11 July 2015. Flanagan registered an early win on a technical decision. Zepeda sustained what looked like a bad dislocation to his shoulder due to clash of arms and was unable to continue, retiring on his stool after round 2. Despite the fight ending early, Flanagan admitted he was upset with the fight finishing after just six minutes of action and talked about a rematch to prove he is the better boxer. He told Boxnation, "I want to prove that I'm the better boxer. Now I'm world champion I can start believing in myself. Lifting a world title is unreal."

==== Early defences ====
Flanagan successfully retained his world title on 10 October at the Manchester Arena in Manchester against number 1 ranked WBO 28-year-old Diego Magdaleno (28–1, 12 KOs). The fight was halted after Flanagan unloaded a flurry of shots against Magdaleno when he was trapped against the ropes. The official time of the stoppage was 2:38 of round 2. Flanagan dropped Magdaleno down three times in total. Referee Terry O’Connor decided to halt it rather than let Magdaleno continue to fight.

Flanagan met Liverpudlian Derry Mathews (38–9–2, 20 KOs) in a rematch, the first being the Prizefighter semi final, which Flanagan won, at the Echo Arena in Liverpool on 12 March 2016. The fight was originally scheduled to take place on 13 February, but was postponed after Flanagan suffered a severe tendonitis on his left foot. Although Flanagan was penalized one point in round eight for throwing and landing an illegal forearm to the chin of Mathews, Flanagan won the fight convincingly via unanimous decision (115–112, 117–110, 117–110). Flanagan overcame a slow start before taking control of the fight in the second half. Both boxers were knocked down once in round 2.

Flanagan was set to make a third defence of his WBO lightweight title against former IBF super-featherweight champion Mzonke Fana (38–9, 16 KOs) on the undercard of Tyson Fury's cancelled July 9 rematch with Wladimir Klitschko. Due to that fight being postponed, the fight was moved to take place at the Ice Arena in Cardiff on 16 July. Flanagan successfully defended his title with a battling win that went the full 12 rounds. Fana rallied after a fourth-round knockdown from a huge left hook but Flanagan's class ensured a third successive title defence. Flanagan troubled Fana with another powerful left in the eighth before dropping him again in the final round. All three judges agreed a 120–106 points success to ensure Flanagan earned a 31st successive win.

==== Flanagan vs. Cruz ====
It was announced on 27 October 2016 that Flanagan would defend his WBO title against 35-year-old former world title challenger Orlando Cruz (25–4–1, 13 KOs) at the Motorpoint Arena in Cardiff on 26 November. A card promoted by Frank Warren which would also feature Billy Joe Saunders first title defence against Artur Akavov. Cruz failed to become boxing's first openly gay world champion after suffering a knockout loss to Orlando Salido for the vacant WBO featherweight title in 2013. This was Flanagan's fourth title defence. With a successful defence, Flanagan would be on course for a future unification fight against the winner of the rematch between Anthony Crolla and Jorge Linares. Flanagan spoke of the fight claiming Cruz is a dangerous fighter but he would be looking to retain his title via stoppage. Flanagan knocked Cruz down twice in the 8th round, the second of which came after a right hand to the temple, which prompted referee Steve Gray to stop the fight 43 seconds into the round. Flanagan had dominated throughout the fight until the finish.

==== Flanagan vs. Petrov ====
At a press conference on 23 January 2017, Frank Warren announced that Flanagan would be making his fifth defence of his WBO world title against former super lightweight world title challenger Petr Petrov (38–4–2, 19 KO's) on 8 April 2017 at the Manchester Arena in Manchester. This would be the first time since October 2015 that Flanagan would be fighting in his home city. The fight went the distance and Flanagan won via unanimous decision. One judge scored the fight a close 116–112 whilst the other two had wide margins of 118–110 and 120–108. Many media outlets including ESPN believed the wider scores were unfair and disrespectful to Petrov even though he may not have done enough to win the fight, he made a lot of rounds close and hard to score. Flanagan said he and his team would target the big names including Jorge Linares and Vasyl Lomachenko.

==== Cancelled defences ====
On 12 June 2017 the WBO president Francisco Valcarcel received word that promoters Bob Arum and Frank Warren were working closely together to come to an agreement for a fight to take place between Flanagan and undefeated mandatory challenger Félix Verdejo (23–0, 15 KOs). Some sources claimed the fight would take place on 9 September in Manchester. There was a hold up in the negotiations due to Verdejo being offered $175,000, however his representatives were looking for him to earn in the region of $450,000 having to travel to Flanagan's home country to challenge for the title. A deal was finally reached for the fight to take place on 16 September 2017 at the Copper Box Arena in London. WBO middleweight champion Billy Joe Saunders was confirmed to take part on the same card. The fight would also mark the fight title Flanagan would fight in London. On 17 July, Warren emailed Top Rank to make them aware that Flanagan had suffered a leg injury, thus postponing the fight. The WBO requested that medical evidence had to be sent to them. Flanagan's team confirmed the evidence would be sent the next day. On 29 September, WBO dropped Verdejo from their mandatory spot, revealing former world title challenger Raymundo Beltrán as their new mandatory.

Promoter Warren stated he was looking scout big names and unifications for Flanagan. Another name mentioned was WBA champion Jorge Linares, however at the time, the WBC ordered him to fight their champion at lightweight, Mikey Garcia. Flanagan, frustratingly said, "I'm struggling to get a big fight. No-one wants to fight me and then I end up getting a voluntary, and everyone slags the opponent. I think they've [WBO] made [Ray] Beltran mandatory. I want unification's. When I beat Beltran everyone will say he's old and past it. I can't win. I'm getting worked up over it because I am the best, and I want to prove I am the best but I can't until them fights getting made. He claimed he did not want a fight with Anthony Crolla." On 23 October, Flanaged stated a deal to fight Linares was 'all but done'.

=== Light-welterweight ===
==== Flanagan vs. Hooker ====
On 26 October 2017, the WBO confirmed that Flanagan had vacated their lightweight title in order to move up the light-welterweight division. At the same time, Crawford, the then WBO light-welterweight champion, had vacated to move up to welterweight. Flanagan entered the WBO rankings at number 1, making his first in line for the vacant title. Flanagan would likely challenge NABO titleholder Maurice Hooker (23–0–3, 16 KOs) for the vacant world title.

On 4 January 2018, Dino Duva of Roc Nation Sports stated the fight between Flanagan and Hooker would take place on 14 April in the UK. Several sources stated the fight would take place at The O2 Arena in London, with WBO middleweight champion Billy Joe Saunders headlining the card. On 20 March, Saunders suffered a hand injury in training forcing the card to be cancelled, however that fight was quickly rescheduled for 23 June 2018 at the same arena. In regards to Flanagan vs. Hooker, Warren stated he was discussing a new date with Dino Duva, Hooker's representatives. On 12 April, Tyson Fury announced he had signed with Flanagan's promoter, Warren and was due to fight on 9 June at the Manchester Arena. With the announcement, it was likely that Flanagan, a Manchester local, would also fight on the same card. Warren officially confirmed the fight the following day. Flanagan failed to become a two-weight world champion, suffering his first loss as a professional via a split decision to Hooker, who came into the contest as the underdog. Two judge's scored it 115–113, 117–111 for Hooker, and the third judged had it 117–111 for Flanagan. Hooker used his size and reach advantage and landed his right hand many times accurately. Flanagan approached the fight going forward into Hooker, but had little success due to the disadvantage. Flanagan was warned by referee Terry O’Connor for using his forearm a number of times. After the bout, Hooker announced he would enter the light-welterweight World Boxing Super Series tourney, which would commence in the fall.

Flanagan's longtime manager Steve Wood admitted it was a tough night however stated his intention to get Flanagan another world title opportunity. According to Wood, Flanagan suffered a concussion in the bout due to the numerous head clashes. Flanagan was open to travelling to Texas for a potential rematch. Another likely scenario was for Flanagan to also enter the WBSS.

==== World Boxing Super Series ====
On 18 July 2018, Flanagan entered into the World Boxing Super Series:Light-welterweight tournament. The draw was scheduled to take place on 20 July at the Rossiya Theatre in Moscow. The other top light-welterweights to enter the tournament were Kiryl Relikh, Anthony Yigit, Ivan Baranchyk, Ryan Martin and Josh Taylor.

==== Flanagan vs. Prograis ====
At the draft gala, the number 1 seed, Interim WBC champion Regis Prograis (22–0, 19 KO), selected to fight Flanagan in the quarter-final. According to ESPN the fight was likely to take place on 27 October at the Lakefront Arena in New Orleans, Louisiana, marking it the first time Flanagan would fight outside of the UK. On fight night, Flanagan lost his second consecutive fight as Prograis beat him via a one-sided 12 round unanimous decision. The judges scored the fight 119–108, 119–108 and 117–110, all for Prograis. Prograis was doing enough in each of the rounds to win them as Flanagan was struggling to let his hands go, only managing to lad his jab. In round 8, Flanagan was dropped following a hook from Prograis. Flanagan beat the count but spent the rest of the round trying to survive. Flanagan was being out-worked in the following rounds. Prograis began to land one punch at a time. This allowed Flanagan to have a good round 11, which saw him land some punches clean. In the last round, Prograis was again able to stun Flanagan with some hard shots. With the win, Prograis advanced to the semi-finals to fight WBA champion Kiryl Relikh.

==== Comeback ====
In his next fight, Flanagan faced Jonas Segu. Flanagan stopped his opponent in the fifth round, which was his first win since April 2017.

Flanagan continued his comeback with another win, this time against Ghanaian Michael Ansah via DQ. Before the stoppage, Flanagan was boxing well and seemed in control of the fight. Ansah repeatedly kept hitting Flanagan during breaks, which cost him one point in the third round, and culminated in his disqualification in the fourth.

Just five weeks after, Flanagan fought again, this time against Jayro Duran. Flanagan managed to score a knockdown during the fight, helping him to an 80–71 victory on the scorecard.

== Professional boxing record ==
38 fights	36 wins	2 losses
By knockout	14	0
By decision	20	2
By disqualification	2	0

No.	Result	Record	Opponent	Type	Round, time	Date	Location	Notes
38	Win	36–2	Jayro Duran	PTS	8	15 Nov 2019	Liverpool Olympia, Liverpool, England	
37	Win	35–2	Michael Ansah	DQ	4 (8), 2:58	11 Oct 2019	Ulster Hall, Belfast, Northern Ireland	Ansah disqualified for repeatedly hitting during a break
36	Win	34–2	Jonas Segu	KO	5 (8), 0:25	12 Jul 2019	Liverpool Olympia, Liverpool, England	
35	Loss	33–2	Regis Prograis	UD	12	27 Oct 2018	Lakefront Arena, New Orleans, Louisiana, US	World Boxing Super Series: light-welterweight quarter-final
34	Loss	33–1	Maurice Hooker	SD	12	9 Jun 2018	Manchester Arena, Manchester, England	For vacant WBO light-welterweight title
33	Win	33–0	Petr Petrov	UD	12	8 Apr 2017	Manchester Arena, Manchester, England	Retained WBO lightweight title
32	Win	32–0	Orlando Cruz	TKO	8 (12), 0:43	26 Nov 2016	Motorpoint Arena, Cardiff, Wales	Retained WBO lightweight title
31	Win	31–0	Mzonke Fana	UD	12	16 Jul 2016	Ice Arena, Cardiff, Wales	Retained WBO lightweight title
30	Win	30–0	Derry Mathews	UD	12	12 Mar 2016	Echo Arena, Liverpool, England	Retained WBO lightweight title
29	Win	29–0	Diego Magdaleno	TKO	2 (12), 2:38	10 Oct 2015	Manchester Arena, Manchester, England	Retained WBO lightweight title
28	Win	28–0	Jose Zepeda	RTD	2 (12), 3:00	11 Jul 2015	Manchester Velodrome, Manchester, England	Won vacant WBO lightweight title
27	Win	27–0	Stephen Ormond	DQ	10 (12), 1:50	14 Feb 2015	Civic Hall, Wolverhampton, England	Won WBO European lightweight title; Ormond disqualified for repeated headbutts
26	Win	26–0	Danny Little	TKO	5 (6), 1:11	13 Dec 2014	Hillsborough Leisure Centre, Sheffield, England	
25	Win	25–0	Martin Gethin	RTD	7 (12), 3:00	26 Jul 2014	Phones 4u Arena, Manchester, England	Won vacant British lightweight title
24	Win	24–0	Yordan Vasilev	TKO	2 (8), 0:17	10 May 2014	Liverpool Olympia, Liverpool, England	
23	Win	23–0	Gyorgy Mizsel, Jr.	PTS	8	8 Mar 2014	Aintree Racecourse, Aintree, England	
22	Win	22–0	Michal Dufek	PTS	6	15 Nov 2013	Winter Gardens, Blackpool, England	
21	Win	21–0	Michael Grant	TKO	2 (6), 1:57	5 Oct 2013	Sports Centre, Oldham, England	
20	Win	20–0	Nate Campbell	RTD	4 (10), 3:00	27 Apr 2013	Motorpoint Arena, Sheffield, England	
19	Win	19–0	Mickey Coveney	RTD	3 (6), 3:00	14 Dec 2012	Winter Gardens, Blackpool, England	
18	Win	18–0	Gary Sykes	SD	3	6 Oct 2012	Liverpool Olympia, Liverpool, England	Prizefighter 26: lightweight final
17	Win	17–0	Derry Mathews	UD	3	6 Oct 2012	Liverpool Olympia, Liverpool, England	Prizefighter 26: lightweight semi-final
16	Win	16–0	Patrick Walsh	UD	3	6 Oct 2012	Liverpool Olympia, Liverpool, England	Prizefighter 26: lightweight quarter-final
15	Win	15–0	Troy James	UD	10	22 Sep 2012	Bowlers Exhibition Centre, Manchester, England	Retained English super-featherweight title
14	Win	14–0	Dougie Curran	UD	10	18 May 2012	Bowlers Exhibition Centre, Manchester, England	Retained English super-featherweight title
13	Win	13–0	Kristian Laight	PTS	4	31 Mar 2012	Winter Gardens, Blackpool, England	
12	Win	12–0	Scott Moises	PTS	6	3 Feb 2012	Bowlers Exhibition Centre, Manchester, England	
11	Win	11–0	Pavels Senkovs	PTS	4	18 Dec 2011	De Vere Whites Hotel, Bolton, England	
10	Win	10–0	Lewis Browning	PTS	6	5 Feb 2011	Brentwood Centre, Brentwood, England	
9	Win	9–0	Stoyan Serbezov	TKO	2 (6), 0:16	22 Jan 2011	The Dome Leisure Centre, Doncaster, England	
8	Win	8–0	Dougie Curran	PTS	6	21 Nov 2010	George H Carnall Leisure Centre, Manchester, England	Won English super-featherweight title
7	Win	7–0	Ignac Kassai	TKO	2 (4), 0:29	17 Sep 2010	Manchester Velodrome, Manchester, England	
6	Win	6–0	Csaba Toth	KO	1 (4), 0:43	30 May 2010	Copley Sports Centre, Stalybridge, England	
5	Win	5–0	Delroy Spencer	TKO	3 (4), 2:50	20 Dec 2009	De Vere Whites Hotel, Bolton, England	
4	Win	4–0	Pavels Senkovs	PTS	4	31 Oct 2009	Leisure Centre, Huddersfield, England	
3	Win	3–0	Michael O'Gara	PTS	4	1 Aug 2009	Municipal Hall, Colne, England	
2	Win	2–0	Delroy Spencer	PTS	6	29 Mar 2009	De Vere Whites Hotel, Bolton, England	
1	Win	1–0	Danny McDermid	PTS	6	24 Jan 2009	Tower Circus, Blackpool, England	

== Post-boxing career ==
On 27 August 2023, Flanagan invaded the pitch of Sheffield United following a goal by Manchester City striker Erling Haaland in a Premier League match between the two sides. Flanagan jumped onto the back of Haaland and kissed his neck before being escorted away by security. Manchester City would then go on to win 2–1.

Sporting positions
Regional boxing titles
Vacant Title last held by Ben Jones	English super-featherweight champion 18 May 2012 – December 2012; Vacated	Vacant Title next held by Gary Sykes
Vacant Title last held by Derry Mathews	British lightweight champion 26 July 2014 – December 2014; Vacated	Vacant Title next held by Scott Cardle
Preceded by Stephen Ormond	WBO European lightweight champion 14 February 2015 – 11 July 2015; Won world title	Vacant Title next held by Tom Stalker
World boxing titles
Vacant Title last held by Terence Crawford	WBO lightweight champion 11 July 2015 – 26 October 2017; Vacated	Vacant Title next held by Ray Beltrán
