= Keita Obara =

Japanese boxer (born 1986)

Keita Obara 小原佳太
Personal information
- Nationality: Japanese
- Born: 12 November 1986 (age 39) Kitakami, Iwate, Japan
- Height: 5 ft 11 in (180 cm)
- Weight: Light-welterweight; Welterweight

Boxing career
- Reach: 72 1/2 in (184 cm)
- Stance: Orthodox

Boxing record
- Total fights: 32
- Wins: 26
- Win by KO: 23
- Losses: 5
- Draws: 1

Keita Obara (小原佳太, Ohara Keita; born 12 November 1986) is a Japanese professional boxer who challenged for the IBF and IBO light-welterweight titles in 2016. At regional level he held the WBC-OPBF light-welterweight title from 2014 to 2015 and the WBO Asia Pacific welterweight title twice between 2017 and 2018.

== Professional career ==
=== Early career ===
Obara made his professional debut on 9 August 2010, losing via fifth-round technical knockout (TKO) in a six-round bout against Kazuyoshi Kumano at the Korakuen Hall in Tokyo, Japan.

After compiling a record of 7–1 (6 KOs) he defeated Hayato Hokazono via fourth-round knockout (KO), capturing the vacant Japanese light-welterweight title on 8 April 2013 at the Korakuen Hall. He went on to successfully defend the title twice that year – a third-round KO against So Takenaka in August and a ninth-round TKO against Tetsuya Hasunuma in December – before defeating Jay Solmiano on 14 April 2014 at the Korakuen Hall, capturing the vacant WBC-OPBF light-welterweight title via fourth-round KO.

He successfully defended the title twice along with two victories in non-title fights, winning all by stoppage, before making his American debut against Walter Castillo on 7 November 2015 at Miccosukee Resort & Gaming in Miami, Florida. The bout served as an IBF light-welterweight title eliminator, with the winner being in line to face newly crowned IBF champion Eduard Troyanovsky. In what some described as a controversial decision, the contest ended in a majority draw, with one judge scoring the bout 115–113 in favour of Obara while the other two scored it even at 114–114.

=== World title challenge ===
Following the draw with Castillo, the IBF ordered an immediate rematch to determine Troyanovsky's mandatory challenger. The IBF set a purse bid for Obara and Castillo to take place on 29 December, with the bid being postponed as both sides were close to agreeing a deal. After Castillo eventually refused the rematch, Obara defeated Sin Maneesri with a first-round TKO in a stay-busy fight in April 2016 before facing Troyanovsky as the IBF mandatory challenger. The bout took place on 9 September 2016 at the Soviet Wings Sport Palace in Moscow, Russia, with Troyanovsky's lightly regarded IBO light-welterweight title also on the line. In a short but action packed contest, Obara staggered the champion in the first round with a right hand but was unable to capitalise and score a knockdown. Troyanovsky attacked with more intensity in the second, landing a right hand to stagger Obara. The champion followed up with a flurry of punches, pinning Obara against the ropes before knocking him down with a right hand, sending Obara through the ropes and onto the judges' table. Obara managed to get back into the ring, only to be met by a sustained attack from the champion, prompting referee Michael Ortega to step in and call off the bout, awarding Troyanovsky a second-round TKO victory. The loss would be the second of Obara's career, and the first since losing his professional debut six years prior.

=== Move to welterweight ===
Following the loss to Troyanovsky, Obara moved up to welterweight. His first fight at the weight was an eight-round UD victory against Larry Siwu in April 2017. In his next fight he defeated Narong Bunchan, capturing the vacant WBO Asia Pacific welterweight title by second-round TKO on 10 August 2017 at the Korakuen Hall. He defended the title with a fifth-round KO against Shusaku Fujinaka in December before facing Alvin Lagumbay on 12 April 2018 at the Korakuen Hall. In a rare occurrence, a double knockdown was scored in the second round after both fighters landed hard left hooks at the same time. Lagumbay rose to his feet appearing unhurt while Obara struggled to stand. Eventually making it to his feet on unsteady legs, the referee decided to wave off the fight, awarding Lagumbay the WBO Asia Pacific title via second round TKO and handing Obara the third defeat of his career. The loss was considered an upset as Lagumbay had moved up multiple weight classes for the fight while Obara was ranked No. 6 by the WBO and No. 8 by the IBF. An immediate rematch was made, taking place at the same venue on 9 August 2018. Obara would get his revenge, regaining the title with a third-round TKO.

His next fight was a final eliminator for the IBF welterweight title, with the winner becoming the mandatory challenger to Errol Spence Jr. The bout took place on 30 March 2019 at the 2300 Arena in Philadelphia, Pennsylvania. Suffering the fourth defeat of his career, Obara lost by UD over twelve rounds, with the judges' scorecards reading 118–110, 117–111 and 115–113.

He bounced back from defeat with stoppage wins against Yosmar Kefi in June and Toshiro Tarumi in October, before defeating Yuki Nagano on 1 February 2020 at the Korakuen Hall to capture the Japanese welterweight title.

Obara made his first Japanese welterweight title defense against Shoki Sakai on 8 April 2021. He won the fight by unanimous decision, with all three judges scoring the fight 96–94 in his favor. Obara was booked to make his second title defense against Masaya Tamayama on 9 December 2021. He won the fight by a fifth-round technical knockout, stopping Tamayama with a right uppercut at the 2:44 minute mark of the round. Obara is scheduled to make his third title defense against Yuki Nagano on 12 April 2022. The bout will be a rematch of their February 2020 meeting, which Obara won by a seventh-round stoppage.

== Professional boxing record ==
32 fights	26 wins	5 losses
By knockout	23	4
By decision	3	1
Draws	1	

No.	Result	Record	Opponent	Type	Round, time	Date	Location	Notes
32	Loss	26–5–1	Jin Sasaki	TKO	3 (12), 1:13	8 Apr 2023	Ariake Arena, Tokyo, Japan	For WBO Asia Pacific welterweight title
31	Win	26–4–1	Takeru Kobata	TKO	3 (10), 2:35	11 Oct 2022	Korakuen Hall, Tokyo, Japan	Retained Japanese welterweight title
30	Win	25–4–1	Masaya Tamayama	TKO	5 (10), 2:44	9 Dec 2021	Korakuen Hall, Tokyo, Japan	Retained Japanese welterweight title
29	Win	24–4–1	Shoki Sakai	UD	10	8 Apr 2021	Korakuen Hall, Tokyo, Japan	Retained Japanese welterweight title
28	Win	23–4–1	Yuki Nagano	TKO	7 (10), 2:39	1 Feb 2020	Korakuen Hall, Tokyo, Japan	Won Japanese welterweight title
27	Win	22–4–1	Toshiro Tarumi	TKO	4 (8), 2:59	26 Oct 2019	Korakuen Hall, Tokyo, Japan	
26	Win	21–4–1	Yosmar Kefi	TKO	4 (10), 0:58	13 Jun 2019	Korakuen Hall, Tokyo, Japan	
25	Loss	20–4–1	Kudratillo Abdukakhorov	UD	12	30 Mar 2019	2300 Arena, Philadelphia, Pennsylvania, US	
24	Win	20–3–1	Alvin Lagumbay	TKO	3 (12), 1:08	9 Aug 2018	Korakuen Hall, Tokyo, Japan	Won WBO Asia Pacific welterweight title
23	Loss	19–3–1	Alvin Lagumbay	KO	2 (12), 2:36	12 Apr 2018	Korakuen Hall, Tokyo, Japan	Lost WBO Asia Pacific welterweight title
22	Win	19–2–1	Shusaku Fujinaka	KO	5 (12), 1:29	14 Dec 2017	Korakuen Hall, Tokyo, Japan	Retained WBO Asia Pacific welterweight title
21	Win	18–2–1	Narong Bunchan	TKO	2 (12), 2:43	10 Aug 2017	Korakuen Hall, Tokyo, Japan	Won vacant WBO Asia Pacific welterweight title
20	Win	17–2–1	Larry Siwu	UD	8	13 Apr 2017	Korakuen Hall, Tokyo, Japan	
19	Loss	16–2–1	Eduard Troyanovsky	TKO	2 (12), 1:35	9 Sep 2016	Soviet Wings Sport Palace, Moscow, Russia	For IBF, and IBO light-welterweight titles
18	Win	16–1–1	Sin Maneesri	TKO	1 (8), 2:31	14 Apr 2016	Korakuen Hall, Tokyo, Japan	
17	Draw	15–1–1	Walter Castillo	MD	12	7 Nov 2015	Miccosukee Resort & Gaming, Miami, Florida, US	
16	Win	15–1	Praruehat Chaisuk	KO	3 (10), 2:06	10 Aug 2015	Korakuen Hall, Tokyo, Japan	
15	Win	14–1	Yuya Okazaki	TKO	6 (12), 1:21	13 Apr 2015	Korakuen Hall, Tokyo, Japan	Retained WBC-OPBF light-welterweight title
14	Win	13–1	Rodel Wenceslao	TKO	5 (10), 1:36	8 Dec 2014	Korakuen Hall, Tokyo, Japan	
13	Win	12–1	Shinya Iwabuchi	TKO	12 (12), 0:19	11 Aug 2014	Korakuen Hall, Tokyo, Japan	Retained WBC-OPBF light-welterweight title
12	Win	11–1	Jay Solmiano	KO	4 (12), 1:50	14 Apr 2014	Korakuen Hall, Tokyo, Japan	Won vacant WBC-OPBF light-welterweight title
11	Win	10–1	Tetsuya Hasunuma	TKO	9 (10), 1:42	9 Dec 2013	Korakuen Hall, Tokyo, Japan	Retained Japanese light-welterweight title
10	Win	9–1	So Takenaka	KO	3 (10), 2:34	25 Aug 2013	Ariake Colosseum, Tokyo, Japan	Retained Japanese light-welterweight title
9	Win	8–1	Hayato Hokazono	KO	4 (10), 2:00	8 Apr 2013	Korakuen Hall, Tokyo, Japan	Won vacant Japanese light-welterweight title
8	Win	7–1	Hayato Hokazono	TKO	8 (10), 0:33	14 Nov 2012	Korakuen Hall, Tokyo, Japan	
7	Win	6–1	Kazuya Maruki	TKO	8 (8), 1:25	13 Aug 2012	Korakuen Hall, Tokyo, Japan	
6	Win	5–1	Yuichi Ideta	TKO	6 (8), 1:17	30 Mar 2012	Korakuen Hall, Tokyo, Japan	
5	Win	4–1	Kengo Nagashima	TKO	2 (8), 2:05	27 Jan 2012	Korakuen Hall, Tokyo, Japan	
4	Win	3–1	Kota Oguchi	TKO	3 (8), 2:00	10 Oct 2011	Korakuen Hall, Tokyo, Japan	
3	Win	2–1	Daichi Sakoda	TD	5 (6), 0:11	30 May 2011	Korakuen Hall, Tokyo, Japan	
2	Win	1–1	Makoto Mori	TKO	2 (6), 1:50	13 Dec 2010	Korakuen Hall, Tokyo, Japan	
1	Loss	0–1	Kazuyoshi Kumano	TKO	5 (6), 1:06	9 Aug 2010	Korakuen Hall, Tokyo, Japan	
