= 2018–19 World Boxing Super Series – Super lightweight division =

Boxing competition

The 2018–19 World Boxing Super Series – Super lightweight division is a World Boxing Super Series professional boxing tournament that took place between October 2018 and October 2019 in several countries. The Super Series features eight top-rated super lightweight boxers in a single-elimination tournament. The tournament was organized by Comosa AG.

== Participants ==
Rating^{1}	Boxer	Record^{2}	Stance	Height	Age^{2}	World titles^{2}
5	Kiryl Relikh (BLR)	22–2–0	Orthodox	1.75 m (5 ft 9 in)	8 March 1988 (aged 30)	WBA (Regular) champion
10	Ivan Baranchyk (BLR)	18–0–0	Orthodox	1.73 m (5 ft 8 in)	24 January 1993 (aged 25)	IBF champion
	Anthony Yigit (SWE)	21–0–1	Southpaw	1.71 m (5 ft 7 1/2 in)	1 September 1991 (aged 26)	IBF mandatory
2	Josh Taylor (UK)	13–0–0	Southpaw	1.78 m (5 ft 10 in)	8 August 1992 (aged 25)	WBC Silver champion
9	Eduard Troyanovsky (RUS)	27–1–0	Orthodox	1.73 m (5 ft 8 in)	30 May 1980 (aged 38)	
1	Regis Prograis (USA)	22–0–0	Southpaw	1.73 m (5 ft 8 in)	24 January 1989 (aged 29)	WBC interim champion
	Terry Flanagan (UK)	33–1–0	Southpaw	1.77 m (5 ft 9 1/2 in)	11 June 1989 (aged 29)	
	Ryan Martin (USA)	22–0–0	Orthodox	1.80 m (5 ft 11 in)	26 February 1993 (aged 25)	

^1 Transnational Boxing Rankings Board rankings on 11 September 2018, the last archived rankings before the start of the tournament.
^2 Age, records, and titles listed as of the start of the tournament.

- Viktor Postol and Subriel Matías are tournament reserve fighters.

== Brackets ==
Quarter-finals
Regis Prograis (USA)	UD 12
Terry Flanagan (UK)
Kiryl Relikh (BLR)	UD 12
Eduard Troyanovsky (RUS)
Josh Taylor (UK)	TKO 7
Ryan Martin (USA)
Ivan Baranchyk (BLR)	RTD 7
Anthony Yigit (SWE)

Semi-finals
Regis Prograis (USA)	TKO 6
Kiryl Relikh (BLR)
Josh Taylor (UK)	UD 12
Ivan Baranchyk (BLR)

Final
Regis Prograis (USA)
Josh Taylor (UK)	MD 12

== Quarter-finals ==
The quarterfinals were held between 7 October and 3 November 2018.

7 October 2018	Kiryl Relikh (Belarus)	UD 12	(Russia) Eduard Troyanovsky	Yokohama Arena, Yokohama, Japan

27 October 2018	Ivan Baranchyk (Belarus)	RTD 7	(Sweden) Anthony Yigit	Lakefront Arena, New Orleans, Louisiana, U.S.

27 October 2018	Regis Prograis (United States)	UD 12	(United Kingdom) Terry Flanagan	Lakefront Arena, New Orleans, Louisiana, U.S.

3 November 2018	Josh Taylor (United Kingdom)	TKO 7	(United States) Ryan Martin	SSE Hydro, Glasgow, Scotland

== Semi-finals ==
The semifinals will be held in 27 April and 18 May 2019.

27 April 2019	Regis Prograis (United States)	TKO 6	(Belarus) Kiryl Relikh	Cajundome, Lafayette, Louisiana, U.S.

18 May 2019	Josh Taylor (United Kingdom)	UD 12	(Belarus) Ivan Baranchyk	SSE Hydro, Glasgow, Scotland

== Final ==
For the WBA (Super), IBF and The Ring titles.

26 October 2019	(United Kingdom) Josh Taylor	MD 12	Regis Prograis (United States)	The O2 Arena, London, England
