= Ryan Martin (boxer) =

American boxer

Personal information
- Nickname: Blue Chip
- Nationality: American
- Born: February 26, 1993 (age 33) Akron, Ohio, U.S.
- Height: 5 ft 11 in (180 cm)
- Weight: Lightweight; Light welterweight

Boxing career
- Reach: 74 in (188 cm)
- Stance: Orthodox

Boxing record
- Total fights: 29
- Wins: 26
- Win by KO: 16
- Losses: 3

Ryan Martin (born February 26, 1993) is an American professional boxer. As an amateur, he was an Olympic hopeful and won several National Amateur Championships but failed to qualify for the 2012 Olympics.

== Amateur career ==
Anson Wainwright of BoxingScene wrote, "From a young age Martin was highly touted." He was dubbed "Kid London" by famed Jermain Taylor as a promising favorite for the 2012 Olympic team. Martin had a reported record of 202 wins with 22 losses, winning numerous American National Championships. His most notable accomplishment was his lightweight gold medal performance at the men's 2010 Under-19 National Championship, earning a berth to represent Team USA.

He was to represent Team USA at the 2010 AIBA Youth World Boxing Championships in Azerbaijan. However, the entire team wasn't able to compete due to a volcanic eruption in Iceland. This was the lone qualifier for the 2010 Summer Youth Olympic games held in Singapore.

At the 2012 Olympic qualifying tournament, Martin failed to advance to the Summer Games by losing to the Olympic alternate, Robert Easter, on points 14-8.

== Professional career ==
After various meetings with promotional companies to sign professionally, the media announced in August 2013 that Martin had signed an exclusive, multi-year, undisclosed deal with rap mogul Curtis "50 Cent" Jackson.

On September 16, 2013, Martin made his professional debut defeating Darus Somieari by way of TKO in round two. He finished 2013 with a KO victory stopping Eric Goodall in just one round. Reports showed HBO's VP of Programming, Peter Nelson, watching the bout ringside with 50 Cent.

Martin was very active in 2014, being put on a fast track by his promoter 50 Cent and manager Tim VanNewhouse. He compiled a total of eight fights while fighting on the undercards of major events televised by Showtime Boxing, ESPN and HBO Sports.

On January 22, 2014 Showtime Sports Shobox analyst Steve Farhood labeled Ryan Martin as a top prospect.

=== WBC Continental Americas lightweight champion ===
==== Martin vs. Villaraga ====
Originally, Martin was to face veteran Fermin De Los Santos. However, De Los Santos was stopped at customs three days before the fight and was prevented from entering the country. An announcement was made that Martin would face former Olympian César Villaraga for the vacant WBC Continental Americas lightweight title.

Martin had a four-inch height advantage and a longer reach than the former Olympian. He was able to stay on the outside as he landed clean punches on Villaraga. Villaraga attempted to initiate exchanges, but Martin effectively countered with three- and four-punch combinations to the head, while digging big left hooks to the body. Slowly but surely, he began to break Villaraga down as the fight went on. In round 4 Martin landed a big overhand right, scoring a knockdown. He continued to dominate throughout the second half of the fight by fast counter punch combinations. All three judges scored the bout in favor of Martin: 79-72, 79-72, and 78-73.

On May 5, 2018, Martin battled Briedis Prescott in an eight round super lightweight bout. Martin managed to score a knockdown in the fifth, which helped him win comfortably on the scorecards, 79-71, 79-71 and 77-73. Martin managed to also drop his opponent in fourth round twice, however, the judge ruled his shots below the waist in both instances.

In his next fight, Martin fought Josh Taylor as a part of the WBSS super lightweight quarter final. Taylor won the fight convincingly, with Martin looking outmatched throughout the fight. Despite coach Abel Sanchez pleading with him to let his hands go, Martin did not seem able to loosen up and start throwing punches towards his opponent. The fight was stopped in the seventh round.

In his next fight, Martin bounced back with a convincing win over Carlos Velasquez, battering the veteran from the opening bell. Velasquez decided to not leave his stool after the end of round six, awarding Martin with the victory.

== Personal life ==
Martin embarked for the Dominican Republic after winning a silver medal at the 2009 National Junior Olympics. He and other USA team members boxed in four cities throughout the nation, carrying with them their Christian faith and spreading the word of Jesus Christ. The week-long trip was organized by USA Boxing's 2008 Olympic Games team manager Joe Smith.

In 2010 Martin received a proclamation from the Mayor of Chattanooga that anointed him an Ambassador of Goodwill "in recognition of his outstanding athletic abilities and service to his community". Mayor Littlefield signed the proclamation.

On February 12, 2014 RevolutionWear's FRIGO underwear company announced a two-year undisclosed sponsorship deal with the boxer. "We're delighted to be working with Ryan Martin," says RevolutionWear's founder and CEO Mathias Ingvarsson. "It's a thrill to see athletes and everyday Americans incorporate FRIGO® into their active lifestyles." The deal mentioned Everlast Worldwide being a part of the design process for Martin's ring attire.

On May 13, 2014, rapper 50 Cent released the music video for "Winners Circle", featuring Guordan Banks, from his fifth studio album, Animal Ambition: An Untamed Desire to Win. The video, directed by Eif Rivera, shows 50 Cent jogging and Martin training for a fight. They meet up in the ring for a victory, joining each other in the winner's circle.

== Professional boxing record ==
26 fights	24 wins	2 losses
By knockout	14	1
By decision	10	1

No.	Result	Record	Opponent	Type	Round, time	Date	Location	Notes
26	Loss	24–2	(United States) Robert Easter Jr.	UD	12	Feb 20, 2021	(United States) Mohegan Sun Arena, Montville, Connecticut, U.S.	
25	Win	24–1	(Colombia) Hevinson Herrera	TKO	1 (10), 1:45	Oct 16, 2020	(United States) White Sands Treatment Center, Plant City, Florida, U.S.	
24	Win	23–1	(Nicaragua) Carlos Velasquez	RTD	6 (10), 3:00	Jun 27, 2020	(United States) White Sands Treatment Center, Plant City, Florida, U.S.	
23	Loss	22–1	(United Kingdom) Josh Taylor	TKO	7 (12), 2:21	Nov 3, 2018	(United Kingdom) The SSE Hydro, Glasgow, Scotland	For WBC Silver super lightweight title; World Boxing Super Series: Super lightweight quarter-final
22	Win	22–0	(Colombia) Breidis Prescott	UD	8	May 5, 2018	(United States) StubHub Center, Carson, California, U.S.	
21	Win	21–0	(Colombia) Luis Eduardo Florez	KO	4 (10), 0:30	Mar 27, 2018	(United States) The Avalon, Hollywood, California, U.S.	
20	Win	20–0	(Mexico) Francisco Rojo	SD	10	Sep 16, 2017	(United States) T-Mobile Arena, Las Vegas, Nevada, U.S.	Retained WBC Continental Americas lightweight title; Won vacant WBA Inter-Continental lightweight title
19	Win	19–0	(Dominican Republic) Marcos Jimenez	UD	10	Jun 30, 2017	(United States) Fantasy Springs Casino, Indio, California, U.S.	
18	Win	18–0	(United States) Bryant Cruz	TKO	8 (10), 0:45	Mar 18, 2017	(United States) Madison Square Garden, New York City, New York, U.S.	Retained WBC Continental Americas lightweight title
17	Win	17–0	(Mexico) Yardley Armenta Cruz	KO	4 (8), 0:48	Dec 16, 2016	(United States) Fantasy Springs Casino, Indio, California, U.S.	
16	Win	16–0	(Colombia) César Villarraga	UD	8	Sep 10, 2016	(United States) The Forum, Inglewood, California, U.S.	Won vacant WBC Continental Americas lightweight title
15	Win	15–0	(South Africa) Samuel Amoako	UD	6	Jul 16, 2017	(United States) Legacy Arena, Birmingham, Alabama, U.S.	
14	Win	14–0	(Mexico) Rosbel Montoya	KO	5 (6), 1:51	Apr 23, 2016	(United States) The Forum, Inglewood, California, U.S.	
13	Win	13–0	(Mexico) Ivan Zavala	TKO	1 (6), 1:04	May 9, 2015	(United States) Minute Maid Park, Houston, Texas, U.S.	
12	Win	12–0	(Puerto Rico) Miguel Soto	TKO	4 (6), 0:54	Apr 11, 2015	José Miguel Agrelot Coliseum, San Juan, Puerto Rico	
11	Win	11–0	(Mexico) Carlos Valenzuela	UD	6	Feb 7, 2015	(United States) State Farm Arena, Hidalgo, Texas, U.S.	
10	Win	10–0	(Mexico) Edgar Llanez	TKO	2 (6), 2:03	Dec 5, 2014	(United States) Grand Plaza Hotel, Toledo, Ohio, U.S.	
9	Win	9–0	(Mexico) Isaias Martin Gonzales	TKO	2 (6), 0:38	Nov 8, 2014	(United States) Boardwalk Hall, Atlantic City, New Jersey, U.S.	
8	Win	8–0	(Mexico) Engelberto Valenzuela	TKO	1 (6), 0:54	Aug 8, 2014	(United States) Consol Energy Center, Pittsburgh, Pennsylvania, U.S.	
7	Win	7–0	(United States) Matthew Bacca	UD	4	Jul 2, 2014	(United States) Foxwoods Resort, Mashantucket, Connecticut, U.S.	
6	Win	6–0	(United States) Ian James	UD	4	Jun 6, 2014	(United States) Turning Stone Resort & Casino, Verona, New York, U.S.	
5	Win	5–0	(United States) Misael Chacon	UD	4	Apr 18, 2014	(United States) Convention Center, Monroeville, Pennsylvania, U.S.	
4	Win	4–0	(United States) Justin Robbins	TKO	2 (4), 2:42	Mar 28, 2014	(United States) Twin River Casino, Lincoln, Rhode Island, U.S.	
3	Win	3–0	(Puerto Rico) Jose Del Valle	UD	4	Feb 12, 2014	(United States) Roseland Ballroom, New York City, New York, U.S.	
2	Win	2–0	(United States) Eric Jamar Goodall	TKO	1 (4), 1:22	Dec 20, 2013	(United States) Resorts World Casino, New York City, New York, U.S.	
1	Win	1–0	(United States) Darus Somieari	TKO	2 (4), 1:42	Sep 16, 2013	(United States) Resorts World Casino, New York City, New York, U.S.	
