= Kiryl Relikh =

Belarusian boxer (born 1989)

Personal information
- Nickname: Mad Bee
- Nationality: Belarusian
- Born: 26 November 1989 (age 36) Baranavichy, Byelorussian SSR, Soviet Union (now Belarus)
- Height: 5 ft 9 1/2 in (177 cm)
- Weight: Light welterweight

Boxing career
- Reach: 67 1/2 in (171 cm)
- Stance: Orthodox

Boxing record
- Total fights: 27
- Wins: 24
- Win by KO: 20
- Losses: 3

Kiryl Olegovich Relikh (born 26 November 1989) is a Belarusian former professional boxer. He held the WBA super lightweight title from 2018 to 2019 and challenged once for the same title in 2016.

== Professional career ==
After turning professional in 2011, Relikh compiled a record of 21–0 before challenging WBA champion Ricky Burns for the super lightweight title, he would fall short losing via unanimous decision in a competitive fight that could have gone either way. He would then go on to fight Rances Barthelemy this time losing a very controversial decision, Relikh would get his revenge 10 months later in a fight that would also be for the vacant WBA super lightweight title.

=== World Boxing Super Series ===
On June 27, 2018, Relikh was the first super lightweight to be announced for the 140 lbs edition of the series.

In the quarter-final, Relikjh defended his WBA super lightweight title against Eduard Troyanovski. In a close matchup, Relikh managed to secure a unanimous decision win, 115–113 on all three scorecards, to retain his WBA belt and move on to the WBSS semi-final.

In the semi-final, Relikh faced American Regis Prograis. In the opening round, Prograis seemed relaxed, and patiently managed to land a hard left to Relikh's liver which dropped Relikh to his knee. In the second, Relikh was careful in protecting his side, which limited his shots and let to another dominant round for Prograis. In the fifth round, Prograis continued his dominance and managed to bloody up Relikh's nose badly. In the sixth round, Relikh's corner had seen enough and threw in the towel.

== Professional boxing record ==
26 fights	23 wins	3 losses
By knockout	19	1
By decision	4	2

No.	Result	Record	Opponent	Type	Round, time	Date	Location	Notes
26	Loss	23–3	(United States) Regis Prograis	TKO	6 (12)	27-04-2019	(United States) Cajundome, Lafayette	Lost WBA super lightweight title; World Boxing Super Series: Super lightweight semi-final
25	Win	23–2	(Russia) Eduard Troyanovsky	UD	12	07-10-2018	(Japan) Yokohama Arena, Yokohama	Retained WBA super lightweight title; World Boxing Super Series: Super lightweight quarter-final
24	Win	22–2	(Cuba) Rances Barthelemy	UD	12	10-03-2018	(United States) Freeman Coliseum, San Antonio	Won vacant WBA super lightweight title
23	Loss	21–2	(Cuba) Rances Barthelemy	UD	12	20-05-2017	(United States) MGM National Harbor, Oxon Hill	
22	Loss	21–1	(United Kingdom) Ricky Burns	UD	12	07-10-2016	(United Kingdom) SSE Hydro, Glasgow, Scotland	For WBA super lightweight title
21	Win	21–0	(Brazil) Joaquim Carneiro	RTD	4 (10)	13-05-2016	(United Kingdom) Bolton Whites Hotel, Bolton	Retained WBA Inter-Continental super lightweight title
20	Win	20–0	(Argentina) Christian Ariel Lopez	TKO	5 (12)	02-10-2015	Gymnase du Lycee Technique, Monaco	Retained WBA Inter-Continental super lightweight title
19	Win	19–0	(Brazil) Lazaro Santos de Jesus	TKO	2 (12)	09-05-2015	(Bulgaria) Academician Lyubomir Chakalov, Vratsa	Won vacant WBA Inter-Continental super lightweight title
18	Win	18–0	(Nicaragua) Santos Medrano	TKO	4 (6)	11-12-2014	(United Kingdom) Double Tree by Hilton Hotel, Sheffield	
17	Win	17–0	(Georgia (country)) Giorgi Abramishvili	TKO	2 (8)	10-09-2014	(Belarus) Moulin Rouge Club, Minsk	
16	Win	16–0	(Australia) Ty Gilchrist	KO	1 (6)	26-04-2014	(United Kingdom) Ponds Forge Arena, Sheffield	
15	Win	15–0	(Russia) Mikheil Avakyan	KO	5 (10)	16-07-2013	(Belarus) Moulin Rouge Club, Minsk	
14	Win	14–0	(Belarus) Siarhei Kisel	KO	1 (8)	28-05-2013	(Belarus) Gladiator Boxing Gym, Molodechno	
13	Win	13–0	(Italy) Paolo Gassani	KO	1 (6)	30-03-2013	Salle des Étoiles, Monte Carlo, Monaco	
12	Win	12–0	(Ukraine) Artem Ayvazidi	KO	5 (6)	19-02-2013	(Belarus) Moulin Rouge Club, Minsk	
11	Win	11–0	(Belarus) Dzmitri Tarenka	TKO	2 (8)	22-01-2013	(Belarus) Golden Gloves Boxing Gym, Minsk	
10	Win	10–0	(Georgia (country)) Anzor Gamgebeli	TKO	2 (6)	18-11-2012	(Belarus) Palace of Sport, Minsk	
9	Win	9–0	(Belarus) Yauheni Kruhlik	PTS	8	04-09-2012	(Belarus) Gladiator Boxing Gym, Molodechno	
8	Win	8–0	(Russia) Rakhim Mingaleyev	RTD	3 (8)	17-04-2012	(Belarus) Moulin Rouge Club, Minsk	
7	Win	7–0	(Belarus) Rustam Nasibov	TKO	1 (6)	21-02-2012	(Belarus) Moulin Rouge Club, Minsk	
6	Win	6–0	(Belarus) Siarhei Malashkevich	KO	2 (6)	31-01-2012	(Belarus) Gladiator Boxing Gym, Molodechno	
5	Win	5–0	(Ukraine) Aliaksandr Pchalkou	KO	1 (8)	22-12-2011	(Belarus) Gagarin Club, Minsk	
4	Win	4–0	(Belarus) Siarhei Afonin	KO	3 (6)	03-11-2011	(Belarus) Gagarin Club, Minsk	
3	Win	3–0	(Uzbekistan) Rustam Zhuraboev	KO	2 (6)	03-10-2011	(Belarus) Gladiator Boxing Gym, Molodechno	
2	Win	2–0	(Bulgaria) Traian Dimitrov	TKO	3 (4)	28-05-2011	Vratsa, Bulgaria	
1	Win	1–0	(Belarus) Alexey Naboischikov	UD	4	25-04-2011	(Belarus) Club Reaktor, Minsk	Professional debut

== See also ==
- List of light-welterweight boxing champions

Achievements
Vacant Title last held by Ricky Burns	WBA light welterweight champion March 10, 2018 - April 27, 2019	Succeeded by Regis Prograis
