= Jose Zepeda vs. Ivan Baranchyk =

Professional boxing match

This is Boxing
- Date: October 3, 2020
- Venue: MGM Grand Conference Center, Paradise, Nevada, U.S.
- Title(s) on the line: vacant WBC Silver light welterweight title

Tale of the tape
Boxer	(United States) Jose Zepeda	(Belarus) Ivan Baranchyk
Nickname	"Chon"	"The Beast"
Hometown	Long Beach, California, U.S.	Amursk, Khabarovsk Krai, Russia
Pre-fight record	32–2 (25 KO)	20–1 (13 KO)
Age	31 years, 4 months	27 years, 8 months
Height	5 ft 8 in (173 cm)	5 ft 8 in (173 cm)
Weight	139 3/4 lb (63 kg)	139 1/2 lb (63 kg)
Style	Southpaw	Orthodox
Recognition	WBC; No. 2 Ranked Light Welterweight; WBO; No. 3 Ranked Light Welterweight; The Ring; No. 6 Ranked Light Welterweight; TBRB; No. 9 Ranked Light Welterweight	IBF/The Ring; No. 3 Ranked Light Welterweight; WBC; No. 6 Ranked Light Welterweight; TBRB; No. 7 Ranked Light Welterweight; Former IBF light welterweight champion

Result
- Zepeda defeated Baranchyk via fifth-round knockout

Jose Zepeda vs. Ivan Baranchyk, billed as This is Boxing, was a professional boxing match contested between former world title challenger Jose Zepeda and former IBF light welterweight champion Ivan Baranchyk, with the vacant WBC Silver light welterweight title on the line. The bout took place on October 3, 2020, at the MGM Grand Conference Center in Paradise, Nevada. Zepeda defeated Baranchyk via fifth-round knockout.

== Background ==
After Ivan Baranchyk lost his IBF Super Lightweight Title to Josh Taylor on May 18, 2019, he fought and knocked out Gabriel Bracero to win the WBA Inter-Continental Super Lightweight Title and get back into title contention.

Jose Zepeda was on a two-fight winning streak after losing a close Majority Decision to José Ramírez in 2019. One of the two wins was over former World Champion Jose Pedraza. He also beat the two-time world title challenger Kendo Castaneda by unanimous decision.

Zepeda and Baranchyk were then scheduled to face off against each other, the winner would become the number one contender for the WBC title.

=== Postponement ===
The fight between Baranchyk and Zepeda was originally scheduled for July 7th, however, Baranchyk suffered an injury to his ribs during training and pulled out of the fight. Zepeda instead faced and beat Kendo Castaneda.

The bout was then rescheduled for October 3, 2020.

== The fight ==
On the 3rd of October 2020, Zepeda and Baranchyk finally faced off in an exciting Fight of the Year and Knockout of the Year candidate. Both fighters were dropped four times each over the course of five rounds, with Jose Zepeda scraping away with a win.

Round 1

From the opening bell, both fighters were on the offensive. Midway through round one, Baranchyk grazed Zepeda with a right to the back of the head which sent him downwards and forces him to touch his glove to the canvas. Zepeda got up and battled on, however, he was dropped again at the end of the round by a left behind the ear, sending him into the ropes. He beat the count and finished the round.

Round 2

At the start of round two, Jose Zepeda caught Baranchyk coming in and sent him down with a flush combination. Baranchyk got up however he was on unsteady legs, Zepeda began beating him around the ring, however, Baranchyk managed to fire back and took Zepeda down with a right to the chin. Both fighters traded for the rest of the round.

Round 3

Both fighters came out slugging at the start of round 3, Zepeda caught Baranchyk on the chin with a colossal left hand and send him down to the floor yet again. Baranchyk got up and, true to form began slugging with Zepeda again. Both fighters were fighting their hearts out for the remainder of the round.

Round 4

The fourth round began with Zepeda being hunted down along the ropes by Baranchyk in a desperate bid to get back into the fight. This trend continued for a majority of the round however Zepeda did have moments of success. With twenty seconds left in round four, Zepeda landed a spectacular shot to Ivan's chin and put him flat on his back. Baranchyk beat the count and held on for the remaining few seconds.

Round 5

Baranchyk again began going for broke at the start of Round 5, and it momentarily paid off. With 40 seconds left in the round, Baranchyk landed a right to Zepeda's cheek and sent him into one of the corners of the ring. Zepeda got straight back up and beat the count, the referee signalled for them to fight, and Zepeda came in and feinted with a right jab before landing a left hook flush on the chin of Ivan Baranchyk. Baranchyk crumpled down to the floor, his right leg bent and his head slamming against the canvas. Referee Kenny Bayless waved the fight off at 2:50 of Round 5.

== Aftermath ==
Baranchyk was carried out on a stretcher and rushed to a hospital, he was discharged the following day.

== Undercard ==
Confirmed bouts:

== Broadcasting ==
Country	Broadcaster
Latin America	Canal Space
United States	ESPN+

Preceded by vs. Kendo Castaneda	Jose Zepeda's bouts 3 October 2020	Succeeded by vs. Hank Lundy
Preceded by vs. Gabriel Bracero	Ivan Baranchyk's bouts 3 October 2020	Succeeded by vs. Montana Love
Awards
Previous: Naoya Inoue vs. Nonito Donaire	The Ring Fight of the Year; 2020	Next: Tyson Fury vs. Deontay Wilder III
Preceded by Anthony Joshua vs. Andy Ruiz Jr. Round 3	The Ring Round of the Year; Round 5; 2020	Succeeded by Tyson Fury vs. Deontay Wilder III; Round 4
