= Josh Taylor vs. Jack Catterall =

Boxing match

Josh Taylor vs Jack Catterall
- Date: 26 February 2022
- Venue: OVO Hydro, Glasgow, Scotland
- Title(s) on the line: WBA (Super), WBC, IBF, WBO, and The Ring light-welterweight titles

Tale of the tape
Boxer	(United Kingdom) Josh Taylor	(United Kingdom) Jack Catterall
Nickname	"The Tartan Tornado"	"El Gato (The Cat)"
Hometown	Prestonpans, East Lothian, Scotland	Chorley, Lancashire, England
Pre-fight record	18–0 (13 KOs)	26–0 (13 KOs)
Age	31 years, 1 month	28 years, 7 months
Height	5 ft 10 in (178 cm)	5 ft 7 in (170 cm)
Weight	140 lb (64 kg)	139 lb (63 kg)
Style	Southpaw	Southpaw
Recognition	WBA (Super), WBC, IBF, WBO, The Ring and TBRB; Undisputed Light-welterweight Champion; The Ring No. 5 ranked pound-for-pound fighter	WBO; No. 1 Ranked Light welterweight WBC/WBA; No. 9 Ranked Light welterweight TBRB; No. 10 Ranked Light welterweight

Result
- Taylor wins via Split Decision (112–113, 114–111, 113–112)

Josh Taylor vs Jack Catterall was a professional boxing match contested between undisputed light welterweight champion, Josh Taylor, and the WBO's mandatory challenger, Jack Catterall. The event took place on 26 February 2022, at the OVO Hydro in Glasgow. Taylor's split decision victory was controversial, with the British Boxing Board of Control launching an investigation into the scoring in the aftermath of the fight.

== Background ==
In January 2019, Catterall was installed as the number one challenger to WBO champion Maurice Hooker. After Hooker lost his title in a unification fight against WBC champion José Ramírez in July, the WBO ordered Ramírez to face Catterall in a mandatory defence. However, the WBC also ordered Ramírez to face their mandatory challenger, Viktor Postol. Ramírez chose to fight Postol with the agreement that the winner face Catterall next. Less than 48 hours after Ramírez defeated Postol in August 2020, he was again ordered to face Catterall next. In October, Catterall had confirmed that he agreed to a "step-aside" deal to allow Ramírez to face unified WBA (Super), IBF, and The Ring champion, Josh Taylor, for the undisputed light-welterweight title, again with the agreement that Catterall face the winner next.

Taylor defeated Ramírez via unanimous decision on 22 May 2021. Days after his victory, Taylor said of Catterall, "Jack Catterall was decent enough to let me do this fight first. He's been mandatory for some time. He agreed to step aside to let this fight happen. You can see his point, there's method in his madness. If that fight's next, he's got the chance to become undisputed champion. He's made a good choice."

In August, ESPN reported that terms had been agreed between Taylor and Catterall to meet on 18 December at the OVO Hydro in Glasgow. It was announced by Taylor on 21 October that he had suffered an injury, and thus the fight would be postponed to 26 February 2022.

A few details on the undercard were announced late January which included a ten round bout between Robeisy Ramirez and Eric Donovan. Kieran Molloy, a recent new signing by Top Rank, would face Damian Esquisabel in his professional debut fight.

== The fight ==
Despite being knocked down by Catterall in the eighth round and being seemingly outboxed by the challenger, Taylor won a controversial split decision victory, with scores of 114–111 and 113–112 in his favour, and 113–112 in favour of Catterall. According to CompuBox, Catterall landed more punches than Taylor in 11 out of 12 rounds. The challenger landed 120 of 525 (23%) total punches, with Taylor throwing and landing far fewer in comparison: 73 of 306 (24%) overall.

== Aftermath ==
Former world cruiserweight champion and pundit Johnny Nelson stated, "It's decisions like this which turn casual fans off. Josh Taylor did not win that fight." The decision was labelled as "the biggest robbery in British boxing history". Irish bookmaker Paddy Power stated that they would be refunding all stakes placed by their customers on Catterall to win the bout, as it "was an absolute robbery". Despite the widespread public opinion, Taylor was defiant in his post-fight interview, saying, "I don't think there is any need for a rematch... I know I won the fight."

== Fight card ==
Weight Class		vs		Method	Round	Time	Notes
Light-welterweight	Josh Taylor (c)	def.	Jack Catterall	SD	12/12		^{Note 1}
Featherweight	Robeisy Ramirez	def.	Eric Donovan	TKO	3/10	1:04
Heavyweight	Nick Campbell	def.	Jay McFarlane	TKO	7/10	2:18	^{Note 2}
Featherweight	Kurt Walker	def.	Jaroslav Hriadel	TKO	1/4	2:03	^{Note 3}
Light-middleweight	Kieran Molloy	def.	Damian Esquisabel	TKO	2/6	0:33	^{Note 4}
Welterweight	Paddy Donovan	def.	Miroslav Serban	TKO	6/6	0:56
Featherweight	Mark McKeown	def.	Engel Gomez	PTS	6/6
Super-welterweight	Bilal Fawaz	def.	Malam Varela	TKO	3/4	3:00
Super-bantamweight	Ebonie Jones	vs	Effy Kathopouli	Draw	6/6
Cruiserweight	Scott Forrest	def.	Erik Nazaryan	TKO	2/6	1:08	^{Note 5}

^Note 1 For WBA (Super), WBC, IBF, WBO, and The Ring light-welterweight titles
^Note 2 For vacant Scottish Area heavyweight title
^Note 3 Walker's professional debut
^Note 4 Molloy's professional debut
^Note 5 Forest's professional debut

== Broadcasting ==
Country	Broadcaster
United Kingdom	Sky Sports
United States	ESPN

== Rematch ==
A rematch between Taylor and Catterall was scheduled to take place at the First Direct Arena in Leeds on 18 May 2024. Catterall got revenge in a hard fought battle, winning via unanimous decision. Following which, Top Rank CEO Bob Arum called the scorecards for the rematch a disgrace and threatened to prevent American fighters under his stable from fighting in the UK in future.

Preceded by vs José Ramírez	Josh Taylor's bouts 26 February 2022	Succeeded by vs Teofimo Lopez
Preceded by vs Abderrazak Houya	Jack Catterall's bouts 26 February 2022	Succeeded by vs Darragh Foley
