= José Ramírez vs. Josh Taylor =

Boxing match

Undisputed
- Date: May 22, 2021
- Venue: Virgin Hotels Las Vegas, Paradise, Nevada, U.S.
- Title(s) on the line: WBA (Super), WBC, IBF, WBO, and The Ring light welterweight titles

Tale of the tape
Boxer	José Ramírez	Josh Taylor
Nickname	"JCR"	"The Tartan Tornado"
Hometown	Avenal, California, U.S.	Prestonpans, Scotland, UK
Pre-fight record	26–0 (17 KO)	17–0 (13 KO)
Age	28 years, 9 months	30 years, 4 months
Height	5 ft 10 in (178 cm)	5 ft 10 in (178 cm)
Weight	139 3/5 lb (63 kg)	139 3/5 lb (63 kg)
Style	Orthodox	Southpaw
Recognition	WBC and WBO; Light Welterweight Champion; The Ring; No. 1 Ranked Light Welterweight; TBRB; No. 2 Ranked Light Welterweight	WBA (Super), IBF, and The Ring; Light Welterweight Champion; TBRB; No. 1 Ranked Light Welterweight; The Ring No. 9 ranked pound-for-pound fighter

Result
- Taylor won via 12–round unanimous decision

José Ramírez vs. Josh Taylor, billed as Undisputed, was a professional boxing match contested on May 22, 2021, for the undisputed light welterweight championship. The bout took place at the Virgin Hotels in Paradise, Nevada. Taylor defeated Ramirez via unanimous decision to become the undisputed champion.

== Background ==
Ramírez became a unified light welterweight champion after defeating Maurice Hooker via technical knockout (TKO) in July 2019, retaining his WBC title (held since 2018) and capturing Hooker's WBO version. Less than 48 hours after successfully defending his titles against the WBC's mandatory challenger, Viktor Postol, via majority decision (MD) in August 2020, Ramírez was ordered to face the WBO's mandatory challenger, Jack Catterall.

Taylor captured his unified titles in 2019 as part of the World Boxing Super Series tournament, defeating IBF champion Ivan Baranchyk via unanimous decision (UD) in May and WBA (Super) champion Regis Prograis via MD in October, winning the vacant Ring title in the process. After nearly a year out of the ring, Taylor successfully retained his titles against the IBF's mandatory challenger, Apinun Khongsong of Thailand, via first-round knockout (KO) in September 2020, leaving Ramírez' mandatory defence against Catterall as the final obstacle to an undisputed fight.

In October, it was announced that Catterall had agreed to a "step-aside deal", with the promise of a chance to fight the winner of a proposed Ramírez vs. Taylor fight. At the beginning of March 2021, the fight was officially announced for May 22.

== The fight ==
Ramírez was the more active of the two in rounds one to four, landing 25 out of 75 punches compared to Taylor's 11 out of 45. In the sixth, a round which saw Taylor suffer a small cut to the corner of his left eye, the Scotsman landed a short left-hand counter on Ramírez' jaw, knocking the American to the canvas. He made it back to his feet by the referee's count of two to see out the remainder of the round. Taylor scored a second knockdown in the final 30 seconds of the seventh round after landing a left uppercut, leaving Ramírez visibly hurt. He again made it to his feet, albeit slower than the first time, with 10 seconds left in the round. The next five rounds were closely contested, with both men finding success. All three judges scored the bout in favour of Taylor with 114–112, giving the Scotsman a unanimous decision victory to become Scotland's second ever undisputed champion after Ken Buchanan, the first Brit to be undisputed since Lennox Lewis in 2000 and only the third man to do so since the four belt era began in 2007 after Terence Crawford and Oleksandr Usyk (Bernard Hopkins and Jermain Taylor had been four belt champions before the WBO became recognised as a major title).

According to CompuBox statistics, Taylor landed 145 out of 530 (27%) punches compared to Ramírez' 134 out of 584 (23%).

== Aftermath ==
Speaking after the bout BBC Radio 5 Live boxing pundit Steve Bunce said "It was a great fight. The pair of them showed fantastic skill. Ramirez showed amazing bravery and I think Taylor showed amazing accuracy. More than that we saw pride and desire for 36 minutes. It was a rollercoaster. It might not happen again. We might not be standing here in five or 10 years talking about a kid achieving what he has done in 18 fights."

== Fight card ==
Confirmed bouts:

Weight Class		vs.		Method	Round	Time	Notes
Light welterweight	(United Kingdom) Josh Taylor (c)	def.	(United States) José Ramírez (c)	UD	12	N/a	^{Note 1}
Light welterweight	(United States) Jose Zepeda (c)	def.	(United States) Hank Lundy	UD	10	N/a	^{Note 2}
Light welterweight	(United States) Kenneth Sims Jr	def.	(Dominican Republic) Elvis Rodriguez	MD	8	N/a	^{Note 3}
Preliminary bouts
Featherweight	(Mexico) Enrique Vivas	def.	(United States) Luis Coria	UD	8	N/a
Super Featherweight	(United States) Andres Cortes	def.	(United States) Eduardo Garza	UD	8	N/a
Featherweight	(Cuba) Robeisy Ramírez	def.	(United States) Ryan Lee Allen	UD	6	N/a
Lightweight	(United States) Raymond Muratalla	def.	(United States) Jose Gallegos	TKO	5 (8)	1:40
Middleweight	(United States) Javier Martinez	def.	(United States) Calvin Metcalf	KO	4 (6)	1:33

^Note 1 For WBA (Super), WBC, IBF, WBO, and The Ring light welterweight titles
^Note 2 For WBC Silver light welterweight title
^Note 3 For vacant WBC–USNBC light welterweight title

== Broadcasting ==
Country	Broadcaster			
Country	Free-to-air	Cable	Pay-per-view	Streaming
United States (host)	—N/a	ESPN	—N/a	ESPN+
United Kingdom^{SCO}	—N/a		FITE TV	
Worldwide	—N/a	Fight Sports	FITE TV	
Indonesia	tvOne	Fight Sports	—N/a	
MENA	—N/a			Fight Sports MAX

SCO - as the away boxer from Scotland

Preceded by vs. Viktor Postol	José Ramírez's bouts May 22, 2021	Succeeded by vs. José Pedraza
Preceded by vs. Apinun Khongsong	Josh Taylor's bouts May 22, 2021	Succeeded by vs. Jack Catterall
