= Kieran Molloy =

Kieran Molloy may refer to:

- Kieran Molloy (boxer)
- Kieran Molloy (Gaelic footballer)
