= Dmitry Bivol vs. Joe Smith Jr. =

Boxing match

- Date: March 9, 2019
- Venue: Turning Stone Resort Casino, Verona, New York, U.S.
- Title(s) on the line: WBA light heavyweight title

Tale of the tape
Boxer	Dmitry Bivol	Joe Smith Jr.
Hometown	Tokmok, Chüy Region, Kyrgyzstan	Long Island, New York, U.S.
Purse	$875,000	
Pre-fight record	15–0 (11 KO)	24–2 (20 KO)
Age	28 years, 2 months	29 years, 5 months
Height	6 ft 0 in (183 cm)	6 ft 0 in (183 cm)
Weight	173 1/2 lb (79 kg)	173 lb (78 kg)
Style	Orthodox	Orthodox
Recognition	WBA; Light Heavyweight Champion; TBRB; No. 1 Ranked Light Heavyweight; The Ring; No. 3 Ranked Light Heavyweight	WBA/TBRB; No. 8 Ranked Light Heavyweight; The Ring; No. 9 Ranked Light Heavyweight

Result
- Bivol defeats Smith Jr. by unanimous decision

Dmitry Bivol vs. Joe Smith Jr. was a professional boxing match contested on March 9, 2019, for the WBA light heavyweight championship.

== Background ==
Weeks after defeating Isaac Chilemba in June 2018, Dmitry Bivol's manager, Vadim Kornilov, revealed that the champion would likely return to the ring in December. With the other light heavyweight titleholders already scheduled to make defences, Kornilov stated, "We're trying to get the biggest name we can to get Dmitry more exposure fighting top guys." In September, there were rumours circulating that Bivol would defend his title against Joe Smith Jr. in December. A month later, it was reported that Bivol was in talks to fight former unified champion Jean Pascal on 24 November, after it was also reported that Smith was reportedly closing in on signing a deal to fight IBF champion Artur Beterbiev in December. Bivol would defeat Pascal lost by wide unanimous decision, while Smith's bout with Beterbiev would be called off.

On 15 January 2019 it was announced that Bivol and his longtime promoter World of Boxing had signed a co-promotional deal with Matchroom Boxing promoter Eddie Hearn. As part of this deal, Bivol, a broadcasting free agent following HBO's withdrawal from boxing at the end of 2018, would appear exclusively on streaming platform DAZN. It was also announced that Bivol's first defence of this deal would be against Smith Jr in March. Bivol was quoted as saying "I am glad to finally meet Joe in the ring, I saw his fights against Fonfara and Hopkins live and always wanted to test my skills against him. Thank you to World of Boxing, Matchroom Boxing USA and DAZN -- I hope to put a great performance for everybody."

Bivol was a 20 to 1 on favourite to win, with Smith a 25 to 2 underdog.

== The fights ==
=== Hooker vs. LesPierre ===
The co featured bout saw WBO Light Welterweight champion Maurice Hooker make the 2nd defence of his title against No. 10 ranked Mikkel LesPierre.

Hooker, who reportedly weighed as much as five pounds over the weight limit earlier on the day of the weigh in, initially weighed in a half pound over the 140 limit. On his fourth and final attempt, Hooker finally made the 140-pound limit.

==== The fight ====
The champion dropped LesPierre in the 9th round with a pair of clean left hooks to the liver. Hooker controlled most the fight en route to a unanimous decision victory with scores of 120–107, 119–108 and 118–109.

The final CompuBox stats had Hooker landing 240 out of 928 total punches (25.9%) while LesPierre landed 103 of 488 total punches (21.1%).

==== Aftermath ====
After the win Hooker said he was willing to fight anybody and told his No. 1 ranked contender Jack Catterall, who was ringside, that he would get his shot at the belt, saying "Where's Jack Catterall? He came all the way over here to watch me fight. Just wait, young grasshopper, you will get your turn".

Preceded by vs. Alex Saucedo	Maurice Hooker's bouts 9 March 2019	Succeeded by vs. José Ramírez
Preceded by vs. Wilton Montero Aquino	Mikkel LesPierre's bouts 9 March 2019	Succeeded by vs. Roody Pierre Paul

=== Main Event ===
Smith started the bout quickly, trying to impose his size advantage on the champion, but Bivol was able to get his jab to pick Smith apart. The 2nd round saw Bivol landing three-punch combinations down the middle that left Smith with a swelling face. Throughout the bout Bivol used his hand speed, footwork, his straight sharp punches, to keep Smith off balance and to control the action. The crowd favourite Smith was able to land a big right hand at the end of the 10th round that left Bivol unsteady however the champion would recover to close the bout strongly, nearly dropping Smith in the final seconds with a stream of punches.

The judges awarded Bivol a unanimous decision with scores of 119–109, 119–109 and 118–110. ESPN scored the fight 118-109 for Bivol.

According to CompuBox Bivol outlanded Smith Jr, landing with 208 of 714 punches thrown (29.1% connect rate) compared to just 39 of 395 (9.9% connect rate) from Smith Jr.

== Aftermath ==
Bivol said in the aftermath "Of course, this was not an easy fight. I trained hard but Joe Smith fought hard and he has strong hands". Of the punch that hurt him in the 10th he said "I felt his right hand on the top of my head, on the side. I lost my balance but I didn't have enough time to react. It was a good punch. Maybe I don't have enough experience. This is a big fight. But at the end of fight I felt that I could knock him out. But that's not my goal. It was a drama fight, it was a good defense. Intelligent boxing. This is a smart sport and you have to think a lot."

Smith was taken to the hospital for precautionary checks after the bout.

Given that all of the other light heavyweight champions at the time (Oleksandr Gvozdyk, Sergey Kovalev and Artur Beterbiev) were promoted by Top Rank there was speculation that Bivol might drop down to super middleweight to challenge it's champion Callum Smith, who like him was promoted by Matchroom.

== Undercard ==
Confirmed bouts:

Winner	Loser	Weight division/title belt(s) disputed	Result
(United States) Maurice Hooker	(United States) Mikkel LesPierre	WBO World Light Welterweight title	Unanimous decision
(United Kingdom) Callum Johnson	(United States) Sean Monaghan	Light Heavyweight (10 rounds)	3rd-round TKO
(Russia) Sergey Kuzmin	(United States) Joey Dawejko	WBA Intercontinental Heavyweight Championship	Majority decision
(Uzbekistan) Israil Madrimov	(Venezuela) Frank Rojas	WBA Intercontinental Light Middleweight Championship	2nd-round TKO
(United States) Otha Jones III	(Georgia (country)) Giorgi Gelashvili	Welterweight (6 rounds)	Unanimous decision
Preliminary bouts
(United States) Nikita Ababiy	(United States) Cory Dulaney	Middleweight (4 rounds)	1st-round TKO

== Broadcasting ==
Country	Broadcaster
Latin America	Canal Space
Panama	Cable Onda Sports
United Kingdom	Sky Sports
United States	DAZN

Preceded by vs. Jean Pascal	Dmitry Bivol's bouts 9 March 2019	Succeeded by vs. Lenin Castillo
Preceded by vs. Melvin Russell	Joe Smith Jr.'s bouts 9 March 2019	Succeeded by vs. Jesse Hart
