= Carl Fail =

English boxer (born 1997)

Personal information
- Nickname: The Chosen One
- Born: 16 January 1997 (age 29) Northampton, England
- Height: 6 ft 1 in (185 cm)
- Weight: Super-welterweight; Welterweight; Middleweight

Boxing career
- Stance: Southpaw

Boxing record
- Total fights: 11
- Wins: 11
- Win by KO: 4
Medal record
Men's amateur boxing
Representing England
EU Championships
Silver medal – second place	2018 Valladolid	Middleweight
ABA Championships
Gold medal – first place	2016 Liverpool	Welterweight

Carl Fail (born 16 January 1997) is an English professional boxer. As an amateur he won the 2016 England Boxing welterweight championship and a silver medal in the middleweight division at the 2018 European Union Championships.

In July 2020, Fail turned professional along with his twin brother Ben. In his 11th pro-fight, he won the Midlands Area super-welterweight title by stopping defending champion Amir Abubaker in the eighth round at Bournemouth International Centre on 26 July 2025.
