= Kieran Molloy (boxer) =

Irish boxer (born 1998)

Personal information
- Born: 26 November 1998 (age 27) Galway, Ireland
- Height: 5 ft 11 in (180 cm)
- Weight: Welterweight; Super welterweight

Boxing career
- Stance: Southpaw

Boxing record
- Total fights: 16
- Wins: 16
- Win by KO: 9
Medal record
Men's amateur boxing
Representing Ireland
EU Championships
Bronze medal – third place	2018 Valladolid	Welterweight

Kieran Molloy (born 26 November 1998) is an Irish professional boxer. As an amateur, he won a bronze medal at the 2018 EU Championships.

== Amateur career ==
Molloy first started training at the age of 5 at a local boxing club in Galway with his two brothers, Connor and Stephen. Molloy started having his first amateur fights at the age of 9, sparring with people older than him due to him being too advanced to spar with people his age. Molloy has won multiple titles, including 11 national championships, 3 Irish Elite championships, European Union Amateur bronze medal and youth European and world medals. Molloy accumulated over 221 amateur bouts and amassed an amateur record of 202–19.

== Professional career ==
=== Early career ===
On December 16, 2021, Molloy signed a contract with promotional companies Top Rank and Conlan Boxing. He made his professional debut on February 26, 2022, at the OVO Hydro in Glasgow, fighting on the undercard of Josh Taylor vs. Jack Catterall against Damian Esquisabel. Molloy won via technical knockout in the second round.

He was scheduled to fight Johnathan Ryan Burrs on the undercard of Artur Beterbiev vs. Joe Smith Jr. on June 18, 2022. However, the fight was cancelled at the last minute due to Burrs testing positive for COVID-19. His next fight was scheduled for August 6, 2022, against a journeyman, Evgenii Vazem, whom he defeated in the second round by a body shot. Molloy spoke during an interview after his victory, expressing interest in fighting in his native town in the future.

I think Kieran Molloy could be a superstar, I really do. He has a bit of everything. I watched his spars with David Avanesyan and they were 50-50 and it’s testament to Kieran the way he’s able to adapt and fight and mix it under supreme pressure.

— Jamie Conlan, President of Conlan Boxing

Molloy went the distance for the first time in his career, defeating Sandro Jajanidze by unanimous decision in Frankfurt, Germany. All ringside officials scored the bout 59–55. His fourth professional boxing appearance was against Alexander Zeledon. The contest took place at the SSE Arena in Belfast on December 10, 2022, as an undercard fight for Michael Conlan vs. Karim Guerfi. Prior to the corner retirement victory, Molloy cut Zeledon above the left eye.

Conlan Boxing announced that Molloy would bring professional boxing back to Galway for the first time since 2009 and headline in his hometown for his fifth professional bout on April 21, 2023, against Fernando Mosquera. He knocked down his opponent in the fifth round. Molloy won in his hometown by defeating Mosquera via points decision, with the referee scoring the bout 80–71.

On August 4, 2023, Molloy faced former English super-lightweight champion Sam O'maison at Falls Park in Belfast, Northern Ireland. Molloy won via technical knockout in the first round by a right hook. Following the bout, Jamie Conlan explained his title plans for Molloy by aiming to have him face the winner of Senan Kelly and David Ryan for the BUI Celtic title by the end of the year. After a hand injury stopped the Ryan vs. Kelly bout, the initial title plans had to be changed, with Conlan eyeing the potential winner between Declan Geraghty and Owen O'Neill for the vacant Irish welterweight championship. The title plans were halted for Molloy for the second time as the Geraghty and O'Neill fight was cancelled last minute due to O'Neill being overweight by over 10 pounds. Later in the year, he received Irish Boxing's Knockout of the Year award for his knockout against O'maison.

Kieran Molloy is going to have some massive, massive nights. In July, we are going to his back garden. We’ll do a show in Galway and showcase just how much skill he’s got.

— Izzy Asif, President of GBM Boxing

On October 28, 2023, Molloy fought in the United States for the first time in his career against Daniel Sostre, scoring a knockdown in the first round before Sostre retired in the corner before the beginning of round two. On March 1, 2024, Molloy announced on his social media platforms that he had left his management team. Molloy told Galway Bay FM: "I suppose that I wasn't happy with the structure and the lack of fights, so you have to listen to your gut and go with what is right". On March 15, 2024, Molloy signed with GBM Sport. Two days later, he was announced as an undercard fight on the Coming of Age boxing card against an unannounced opponent on April 20, 2024, at the Magna Centre in Rotherham. Molloy was later confirmed to be fighting Sergio Garcia Herrera in his second eight-round fight in his career. Molloy took a knee for the first time in his career in the sixth round due to a body shot, but he won via points decision after showing a 'warriors mentality' as described by his promoter, Izzy Asif, as the referee scored the contest 76–75 in favour of Molloy, especially after sustaining a rib injury prior. Asif revealed after Molloy's victory over Herrera that it was planned for Molloy to be fighting in his hometown in July.

On June 29, 2024, Molloy went the distance in Coventry against Matthew King, with the referee scoring 80–72 in favour of Molloy, with rumours that his next fight would be in his hometown in August or September after plans couldn't be reached for July. Molloy returned to the ring against journeyman Robin Zamora at Park Community Arena, Sheffield, England, where he was victorious by points decision with the referee scoring the bout 80–72 in favour of Molloy. On April 4, 2025, Molloy fought at York Hall Leisure Centre, defeating Riccardo Crepaldi by fifth-round technical knockout.

=== Rise up the ranks ===
==== Cancelled fight with Benjamin ====
After two years of unmaterialised attempts at getting the fight back in Galway and fizzled title opportunities, it was announced that Molloy will be returning to his hometown to fight at Pearse Stadium on June 28, 2025. On 11 May 2025, GBM Sports announced that Molloy was to headline Galway Glory against Kaisee Benjamin (18–4–1, 6 KOs) for the WBA European welterweight title. In an interview, Molloy revealed that originally Senan Kelly, Dylan Moran and Lee Reeves were all offered fights for an Irish welterweight title, which they all refused. Molloy mentioned that headlining a show on the biggest stage in Galway was his childhood dream and aims to make his hometown a hub for domestic Irish boxing. It was confirmed that Molloy would be fighting a ten-round fight for the first time in his career. The fight was cancelled due to unforeseen circumstances, and a new venue and main event were issued. Molloy later posted on his social media that he has split from GBM Sports. Molloy's father confirmed that they were not given a reason for the cancellation and later attempted to move the fight to a different card and promotion, which Benjamin rejected. After the setback of the Galway fight, Molloy secured himself a spot on a Michael Conlan undercard at the 3Arena in Dublin as a free agent. On 5 September 2025, Molloy faced against Nourdeen Toure (12–4, 6 KOs), where the referee stopped the contest in round three after a lack of defence from Toure. Molloy fought on Channel 5 on November 21, 2025, as an undercard bout of a Wasserman Boxing card where he defeated Zeuz Varguez Soberanis by points decision. After the bout, he signed with Wasserman Boxing, where he aims to fight for his first title.

==== Molloy vs. Kohlen ====
In early February, it was announced that Molloy will be returning to the ring for the vacant IBF European welterweight title against Xavier Kohlen (15–2–1, 7 KOs) on 20 March 2026, at the SSE Arena, Belfast. The bout was confirmed as the co-main event on the inaugural Misfits Pro card, headlined by Michael Conlan. It was confirmed that Molloy would be fighting a ten-round fight for the first time in his career after the cancellation of the Galway Glory card. At the official weigh-in, Molloy tipped the scales at 146 lbs and 6 oz, making him two ounces heavier than Kohlen. Molloy won his first regional title by unanimous decision, with the judges scoring the bout 100–90, 99–91, 98–92. Following the rebranding of Wasserman Boxing to Misfits Sports, it was officially confirmed that Molloy would join the Misfits Pro stable. After his victory, Molloy outlined his roadmap, targeting the EBU Silver welterweight title as his next goal before challenging for the full EBU European welterweight title within his next two bouts.

==== Molloy vs. Noakes ====
Following his title victory, it was announced that Molloy would make the first defence of his IBF European welterweight title against unbeaten former English welterweight champion Sean Noakes (12–0, 5 KOs) at the Copper Box Arena in London on 18 July 2026. At the official weigh-in, Noakes tipped the scales slightly heavier at 147 lbs, while Molloy weighed in at 146.7lbs. Molloy entered the bout as a slight betting favourite with average odds of -196. During the bout, Molloy knocked down Noakes in the eighth round, winning via technical knockout moments later. Molloy was awarded a £5,000 Misfits Pro Performance of the Night cash bonus. On 5 August 2026, the IBF updated its world rankings, placing Molloy at number fourteen in the welterweight division.

==== Molloy vs. Suppan ====
On 9 October 2026, it was officially announced that Molloy would make his sixteenth professional appearance against Steve Suppan (17–5–1, 8 KOs) in an eight-round welterweight contest. The bout was confirmed to take place on the undercard of the MF Pro event at the OVO Arena, Wembley in London on 14 November 2026, with the card broadcasting internationally on DAZN. Molloy won the bout by technical knockout in the second round, prior to the stoppage, Molloy knocked down Suppan twice in the second round.

== Professional boxing record ==
16 fights	16 wins	0 losses
By knockout	9	0
By decision	7	0

No.	Result	Record	Opponent	Type	Round, time	Date	Location	Notes
16	Win	16–0	Steve Suppan	TKO	2 (8), 3:00	14 Nov, 2026	OVO Arena Wembley, London, England	
15	Win	15–0	Sean Noakes	TKO	8 (10), 1:58	18 Jul, 2026	Copper Box Arena, London, England	Retained IBF European welterweight title
14	Win	14–0	Xavier Kohlen	UD	10	Mar 20, 2026	SSE Arena, Belfast, Northern Ireland	Won vacant IBF European welterweight title
13	Win	13–0	Zeuz Varguez Soberanis	PTS	8	Nov 21, 2025	Brighton Centre, Brighton, England	
12	Win	12–0	Nourdeen Toure	TKO	3 (6), 1:04	Sep 5, 2025	3Arena, Dublin, Ireland	
11	Win	11–0	Riccardo Crepaldi	TKO	5 (8), 2:11	Apr 4, 2025	York Hall, London, England	
10	Win	10–0	Robin Zamora	PTS	8	Dec 7, 2024	Park Community Arena, Sheffield, England	
9	Win	9–0	Matthew King	PTS	8	Jun 29, 2024	Skydome, Coventry, England	
8	Win	8–0	Sergio Garcia Herrera	PTS	8	Apr 20, 2024	Magna Centre, Rotherham, England	
7	Win	7–0	Daniel Sostre	RTD	1 (6), 3:00	Oct 28, 2023	Freeport Hall, Boston, Massachusetts, US	
6	Win	6–0	Sam O'maison	TKO	1 (6), 1:42	Aug 4, 2023	Falls Park, Belfast, Northern Ireland	
5	Win	5–0	Fernando Mosquera	PTS	8	Apr 21, 2023	Salthill Leisureland Complex, Galway, Ireland	
4	Win	4–0	Alexander Zeledon	RTD	2 (6), 3:00	Dec 10, 2022	SSE Arena, Belfast, Northern Ireland	
3	Win	3–0	Sandro Jajanidze	UD	6	Oct 22, 2022	Fabriksporthalle, Frankfurt, Germany	
2	Win	2–0	Evgenii Vazem	TKO	2 (6), 1:25	Aug 6, 2022	SSE Arena, Belfast, Northern Ireland	
1	Win	1–0	Damian Esquisabel	TKO	2 (4), 0:33	Feb 26, 2022	OVO Hydro, Glasgow, Scotland	

== Awards and nominations ==
Year	Award	Category	Recipient(s)	Result	Ref.
2018	IABA	Best Male Elite Boxer	Himself	Won	
2023	Irish Boxing	Knockout of the Year	His knockout over Sam O'maison	Won	
2023	Irish Boxing	Prospect of the Year	Himself	Nominated	
2024	Irish Boxing	Fight of the Year	Himself vs. Sergio Garcia Herrera	Nominated	
2026	Misfits Boxing	Performance of the Night	Himself vs. Sean Noakes	Won	
