= 2018 European Union Amateur Boxing Championships =

Boxing competitions

2018 Men's European Union Boxing Championships
- Host city: Valladolid
- Country: Spain
- Dates: 8–19 November

The Men's 2018 European Union Amateur Boxing Championships was held in Valladolid, Spain from 8 to 19 November. The 9th edition of the competition was organised by the European governing body for amateur boxing, the European Boxing Confederation.

== Medal winners ==
Event	Gold	Silver	Bronze
Light flyweight (49 kg)	Federico Serra (ITA)	Shakhil Allakhverdiev (GEO)	Jakub Słomiński (POL)
Light flyweight (49 kg)	Federico Serra (ITA)	Shakhil Allakhverdiev (GEO)	Martin Molina (ESP)
Flyweight (52 kg)	Gabriel Escobar (ESP)	Will Cawley (ENG)	Tinko Banabakov (BUL)
Flyweight (52 kg)	Gabriel Escobar (ESP)	Will Cawley (ENG)	Nodari Darbaidze (GEO)
Bantamweight (56 kg)	Kurt Walker (IRL)	Peter McGrail (ENG)	Jordan Rodriguez (FRA)
Bantamweight (56 kg)	Kurt Walker (IRL)	Peter McGrail (ENG)	Artush Gomtsyan (GEO)
Lightweight (60 kg)	Sofiane Oumiha (FRA)	Calum French (ENG)	Radomir Obruśniak (POL)
Lightweight (60 kg)	Sofiane Oumiha (FRA)	Calum French (ENG)	Francesco Maietta (ITA)
Light welterweight (64 kg)	Luke McCormack (ENG)	Paolo Di Lernia (ITA)	Fredrik Jensen (DEN)
Light welterweight (64 kg)	Luke McCormack (ENG)	Paolo Di Lernia (ITA)	Dmitri Galagoț (MDA)
Welterweight (69 kg)	Pat McCormack (ENG)	Youba Sissokho (ESP)	Kieran Molloy (IRL)
Welterweight (69 kg)	Pat McCormack (ENG)	Youba Sissokho (ESP)	Filip Wąchała (POL)
Middleweight (75 kg)	Andrej Csemez (SVK)	Carl Fail (ENG)	Salvatore Cavallaro (ITA)
Middleweight (75 kg)	Andrej Csemez (SVK)	Carl Fail (ENG)	Victor Corobcevschii (MDA)
Light heavyweight (81 kg)	Benjamin Whittaker (ENG)	Andrei Arădoaie (ROU)	Matúš Strnisko (SVK)
Light heavyweight (81 kg)	Benjamin Whittaker (ENG)	Andrei Arădoaie (ROU)	Gaëtan Ntambwe (FRA)
Heavyweight (91 kg)	Aziz Abbas Mouhidine (ITA)	Toni Filipi (CRO)	Cheavon Clarke (ENG)
Heavyweight (91 kg)	Aziz Abbas Mouhidine (ITA)	Toni Filipi (CRO)	Cristian Filip (ROU)
Super heavyweight (+91 kg)	Frazer Clarke (ENG)	Petar Belberov (BUL)	Marko Milun (CRO)
Super heavyweight (+91 kg)	Frazer Clarke (ENG)	Petar Belberov (BUL)	Ayoub Ghadfa Drissi (ESP)

== Medal table ==
Rank	Nation	Gold	Silver	Bronze	Total
1	England (ENG)	4	4	1	9
2	Italy (ITA)	2	1	2	5
3	Spain (ESP)	1	1	2	4
4	France (FRA)	1	0	2	3
5	Ireland (IRL)	1	0	1	2
5	Slovakia (SVK)	1	0	1	2
7	Georgia (GEO)	0	1	2	3
8	Bulgaria (BUL)	0	1	1	2
8	Croatia (CRO)	0	1	1	2
8	Romania (ROU)	0	1	1	2
11	Poland (POL)	0	0	3	3
12	Moldova (MDA)	0	0	2	2
13	Denmark (DEN)	0	0	1	1
Totals (13 entries)		10	10	20	40
