= Will Cawley =

English boxer

Personal information
- Nationality: English
- Born: 6 September 1997 (age 28) Oldham, England
- Height: 5 ft 5 in (165 cm)
- Weight: Flyweight

Boxing career
Medal record
Men's professional boxing
Representing England
EU Championships
| Silver medal – second place | 2018 Valladolid | Flyweight |
ABA Championships
| Gold medal – first place | 2016 Liverpool | Flyweight |

William Cawley (born 6 September 1997) is an English professional boxer. He was the 2016 ABA flyweight champion and won a silver medal at the 2018 EU Championships, and also competed at the 2017 and 2018 World Series of Boxing, representing the British Lionhearts.
