= Eric Donovan =

Irish boxer (born 1985)

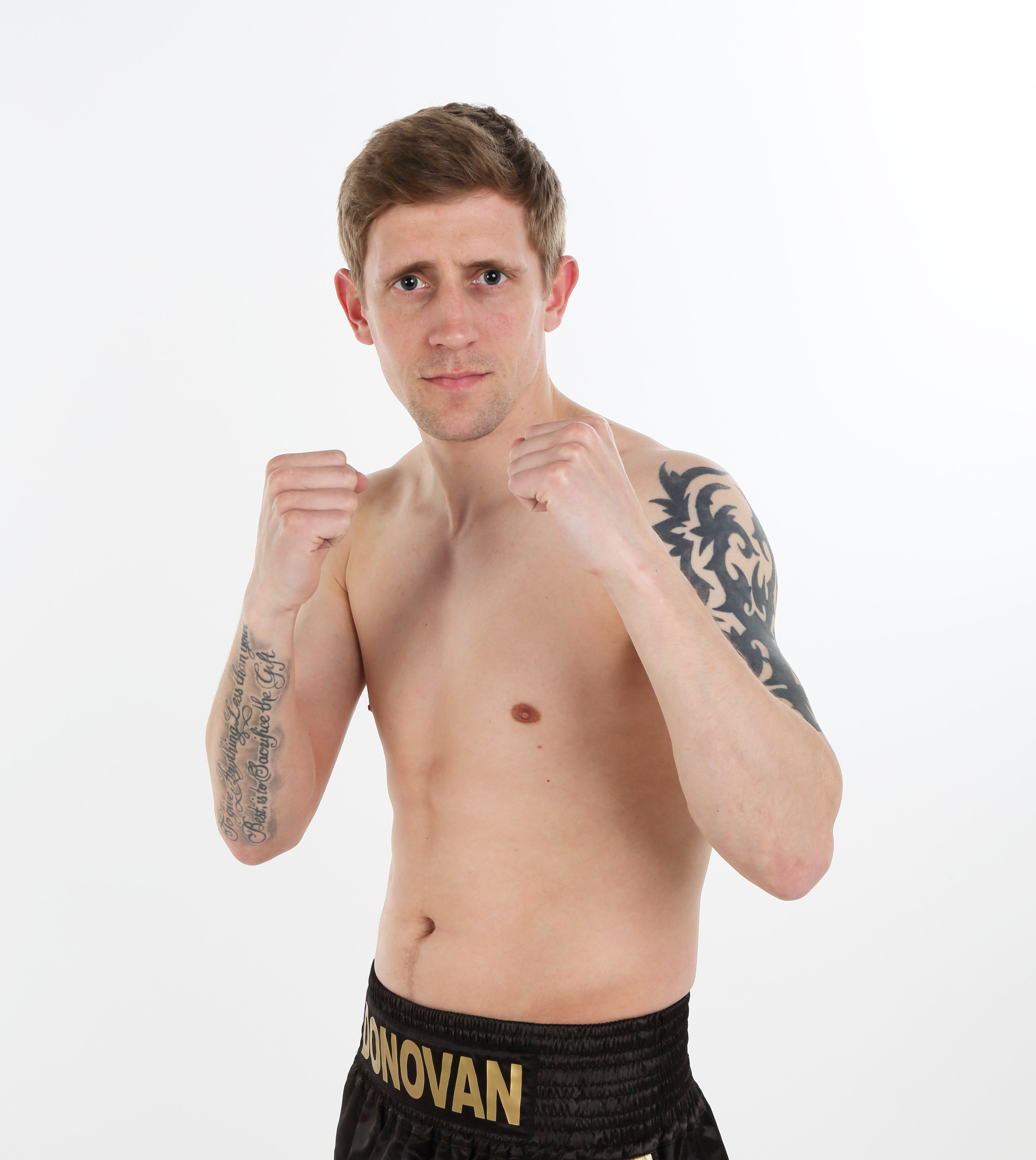

Personal information
- Nickname: Lilywhite Lightning
- Nationality: Irish
- Born: 26 July 1985 (age 41) Athy, County Kildare, Ireland
- Height: 1.72 m (5 ft 8 in)
- Weight: Featherweight; Super-featherweight
- Website: www.ericdonovan.ie

Boxing career

Boxing record
- Total fights: 18
- Wins: 16
- Win by KO: 8
- Losses: 2
Medal record
Men's amateur boxing
Representing Ireland
European Championships
Bronze medal – third place	2010 Moscow	Lightweight
European Union Championships
Bronze medal – third place	2009 Odense	Lightweight

Eric Donovan (born 26 July 1985) is an Irish professional boxer. As an amateur he was a five-time Irish national champion and won bronze medals at the 2009 European Union Championships and the 2010 European Championships.

== Amateur career ==
Donovan boxed for St. Michael's Boxing Club, Athy, where he was trained by Dominic O'Rourke. He debuted as a senior boxer in the bantamweight division before moving to featherweight and in 2007 to lightweight. His first Irish Elite title came in 2004 at bantamweight with a points victory over Brian Gillen in the final. Donovan would go on to win five Irish Elite titles.

In 2004, he competed at the Youth World Championship in Jeju, South Korea, losing in the round of 32 to Hoandry Lomba from Cuba. Donovan competed at the 2005 World Championships in Mianyang, China. He defeated featherweight Arash Usmanee of Canada on points (31:12), but lost in the second round against Viorel Simion of Romania on points (25:40), which he left and finished ninth overall.

In the 2006 European Championship in Plovdiv he earned a points victory over the strong Turk Yakup Kiliç (33:29), but was defeated in the second round against Alexei Schaidulin from Bulgaria.

In the 2007 World Championships in Chicago, he moved up to compete at lightweight earning victories over Miklos Varga from Hungary (39:22) and Jonathan Batista from the Dominican Republic (21:4). In the next round he encountered the favored Italian Domenico Valentino, against whom he lost on points (12:29), which gave him a ninth-place finish at this championship.

He earned a points victory over Ross Hickey to clinch the 2009 Irish lightweight title which earned him a spot on the Irish team at the World Championships in Milan. There he won his first fight against Tajiks Bahodir Karimov on points (13: 4), but lost his next fight against the Indian Jai Bhagwan on points.

=== European medalist ===
In March 2010, he defeated reigning world champion Domenico Valentino on points (11:8), which set him up for the European Championships in Moscow. There he defeated Rashid Kassem of Denmark (10:2) before overcoming Dimitri Bulenkow of Ukraine (10:2) and then Miklos Varga of Hungary (10:4) which guaranteed Donovan a bronze medal. Finally, he lost semi-final against Albert Selimov from Russia on points.

=== World Series of Boxing ===
Donovan was one of six Irish boxers drafted in the 2012 season of the World Series of Boxing (WSB). Ireland had the biggest number of boxers drafted and Donovan joined the Astana Arlans of Kazakhstan along with Tyrone McCullagh during the international draft in Lausanne, Switzerland.

Donovan was victorious in his WSB debut beating Branamir Stankovic on a unanimous decision (48–47, 50–45, 48–47) in Almaty, Kazakhstan. Despite narrowly losing his final bout to Vyacheslav Kyslytsyn of the Ukraine Otamans, Donovan was part of the team that won the overall competition.

== Professional career ==
Donovan turned professional in June 2016. In his opening bout he defeated Polish veteran Damian Lawniczak earning a 40–36 points decision victory on a Ricky Hatton promoted show at the National Stadium in Dublin.

The Kildare boxer quickly racked up four wins in his first year as before taking on the first significant challenge of his career when he fought Welsh champion Dai Davies for the BUI Celtic title. Donovan won the title at the National Stadium in Dublin by winning every round against Davies and then went on to defend the title in December 2017 against Spaniard Juan Luis Gonzalez.

Donovan would win the BUI Irish National title in March 2019, knocking out Stephen McAfee in the fourth round.

In June 2020 it was announced that Donovan was to fight Commonwealth super-featherweight champion Zelfa Barrett, as chief undercard support to Felix Cash versus Jason Welborn on the third of Matchroom Boxing's Fight Camp cards, which were confirmed to take place on 1 August, 7 August, 14 August and 21 August. Giving away a significant size advantage to the younger Barret, Donovan used his amateur boxing pedigree to shade the first 6 rounds, however the heavier blows from Barret told in the 7th round, with Donovan knocked down twice. A third and final knockdown by Barret in the 8th ended the fight.

In April 2021 it was announced that Donovan would challenged Italy's Mario Alfano for the vacant European super featherweight title on 14 May 2021, with the bout set for Brescia in Italy.

In September 2022, Eric Donovan won the EBU super-featherweight title, beating Frenchman Khalil El Hadri in the Europa Hotel in Belfast. About six weeks later, in November 2022, he announced his retirement from boxing, saying "now after 30 years in the game, I am finally content with my achievements in the ring".

== Professional boxing record ==
18 fights	16 wins	2 losses
By knockout	8	2
By decision	8	0

No.	Result	Record	Opponent	Type	Round, time	Date	Location	Notes
18	Win	16–2	(France) Khalil El Hadri	PTS	12	24 Sep 2022	(United Kingdom) Europa Hotel, Belfast, Northern Ireland	Won EBU super-featherweight title
17	Win	15–2	(Nicaragua) Engel Gomez	PTS	6	14 May 2022	(United Kingdom) Europa Hotel, Belfast, Northern Ireland	
16	Loss	14–2	(Cuba) Robeisy Ramírez	TKO	3 (10), 1:40	26 Feb 2022	(United Kingdom) OVO Hydro, Glasgow, Scotland	
15	Win	14–1	(Hungary) Laszlo Szoke	TKO	4 (6), 1:55	4 Sep 2021	(United Kingdom) Europa Hotel, Belfast, Northern Ireland	
14	Win	13–1	(Nicaragua) Rafael Castillo	UD	6	5 Dec 2020	Fight Off Training Centre, Wavre, Belgium	
13	Loss	12–1	(United Kingdom) Zelfa Barrett	TKO	8 (10), 1:35	14 Aug 2020	(United Kingdom) Matchroom Fight Camp, Brentwood, England	For vacant IBF Inter-Continental junior-lightweight title
12	Win	12–0	(Mexico) Joseafat Reyes	TKO	7 (8), 0:51	1 Feb 2020	(United Kingdom) The Devenish Complex, Belfast, Northern Ireland	
11	Win	11–0	(Nicaragua) Jose Aguilar	PTS	6	23 Nov 2019	(United Kingdom) Crowne Plaza Hotel, Glasgow, Scotland	
10	Win	10–0	(Nicaragua) Moises Mojica	KO	3 (6), 2:42	22 Jun 2019	(United Kingdom) York Hall, London, England	
9	Win	9–0	(Republic of Ireland) Stephen McAfee	KO	4 (10), 2:29	30 Mar 2019	(Republic of Ireland) National Stadium, Dublin, Dublin, Ireland	Won vacant BUI National featherweight title
8	Win	8–0	(Bulgaria) Samuil Dimitrov	PTS	4	14 Jul 2018	(Republic of Ireland) Good Counsel G.A.A. Club, Dublin, Ireland	
7	Win	7–0	(Hungary) Ignac Kassai	TKO	2 (6), 1:26	17 Feb 2018	(Republic of Ireland) WIT Arena, Waterford, Ireland	
6	Win	6–0	(Spain) Juan Luis Gonzalez	PTS	8	2 Dec 2017	(Republic of Ireland) National Stadium, Dublin, Dublin, Ireland	Retained BUI Celtic featherweight title
5	Win	5–0	(Wales) Dai Davies	PTS	8	9 Sep 2017	(Republic of Ireland) National Stadium, Dublin, Dublin, Ireland	Won vacant BUI Celtic featherweight title
4	Win	4–0	(Hungary) Laszlo Horvath	TKO	4 (8)	27 May 2017	(Republic of Ireland) National Stadium, Dublin, Dublin, Ireland	
3	Win	3–0	(Romania) Stefan Nicolae	TKO	2 (6), 2:04	25 Feb 2017	(Republic of Ireland) National Stadium, Dublin, Dublin, Ireland	
2	Win	2–0	(Poland) Krzysztof Rogowski	TKO	2 (4), 1:23	5 Nov 2016	(Republic of Ireland) National Stadium, Dublin, Dublin, Ireland	
1	Win	1–0	(Poland) Damian Lawniczak	PTS	4	25 Jun 2016	(Republic of Ireland) National Stadium, Dublin, Dublin, Ireland	

== Politics ==
In June 2024, Donovan was elected for Sinn Féin to Louth County Council representing the Drogheda Rural electoral area.
