= Jose Zepeda =

American boxer (born 1989)

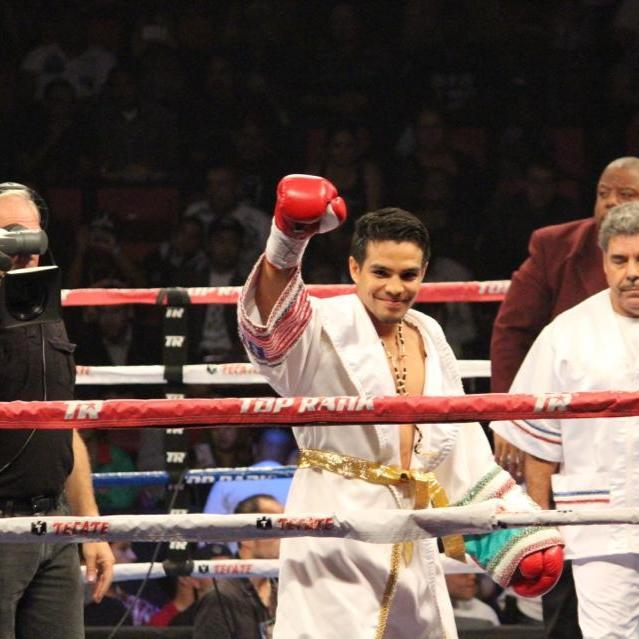
- Zepeda at Thomas & Mack Center, Las Vegas

Personal information
- Nickname: Chon
- Nationality: American
- Born: May 24, 1989 (age 37) Long Beach, California, U.S.
- Height: 5 ft 8 in (173 cm)
- Weight: Lightweight; Light welterweight

Boxing career
- Reach: 70 1/2 in (179 cm)
- Stance: Southpaw

Boxing record
- Total fights: 45
- Wins: 38
- Win by KO: 29
- Losses: 5
- No contests: 2

Jose Encarnacion Zepeda (born May 24, 1989) is an American professional boxer who challenged for the WBO lightweight title in 2015 and twice for the WBC light welterweight title in 2019 and 2022.

== Professional career ==
Jose began his professional career in 2009.

In December 2010, Jose began working with famed boxing trainer Robert Alcazar, former trainer for World Champion Oscar De La Hoya.

In July 2013, he fought former title contender Ricardo Dominguez and won by TKO in the 3rd round.

On 11 July 2015, Zepeda fought Terry Flanagan in Manchester, England, for the vacant WBO lightweight title. The fight started off entertaining, however, Zepeda was unfortunate enough to injure his shoulder while throwing a punch in the second round. The fight was stopped at the end of the round due to the injury, awarding Flanagan the victory.

In February 2019, he unsuccessfully challenged WBC Super lightweight champion Jose Ramirez for his title, losing a Majority decision in a very competitive fight.

In his bout against Jose Pedraza, Zepeda started off fast and built up an early lead on the scorecards. Pedraza would show some signs of a comeback, starting in the fifth round. In the end, Zepeda was too much for his opponent and was awarded a clear unanimous decision victory.

On March 23, 2024 in Sheffield, England, Zepeda was scheduled to face Dalton Smith. He lost the fight by knockout in the fifth round after being hit with a body shot.

== Professional boxing record ==
44 fights	37 wins	5 losses
By knockout	28	3
By decision	9	2
No contests	2	

No.	Result	Record	Opponent	Type	Round, time	Date	Location	Notes
44	Win	38–5 (2)	Ivan Redkach	TKO	2 (10), 2:02	Sep 7, 2024	Pechanga Resort And Casino, Temecula, California	Won the interim WBC Silver light welterweight title
43	Loss	37–5 (2)	Dalton Smith	KO	5 (12), 1:25	Mar 23, 2024	Sheffield Arena, Sheffield, England	For vacant WBC Silver light welterweight title
42	Loss	37–4 (2)	Richardson Hitchins	UD	12	Sep 23, 2023	Caribe Royale Orlando, Orlando, Florida, U.S.	For IBF North American, vacant WBC Silver and WBO-NABO light welterweight titles
41	Win	37–3 (2)	Neeraj Goyat	UD	10	Mar 25, 2023	El Domo del Code Jalisco, Guadalajara, Mexico	
40	Loss	36–3 (2)	Regis Prograis	KO	11 (12) 0:59	Nov 26, 2022	Dignity Health Sports Park, Carson, California, U.S.	For vacant WBC light welterweight title
30	Win	36–2 (2)	Francisco Javier Perez	TKO	2 (10), 1:02	Mar 19, 2022	Gimnasio Municipal "Jose Neri Santos", Ciudad Juárez, Mexico	
39	Win	35–2 (2)	Josue Vargas	TKO	1 (10), 1:45	Oct 30, 2021	Hulu Theater, New York City, New York, U.S.	Retained WBC Silver light welterweight title
38	Win	34–2 (2)	Hank Lundy	UD	10	May 22, 2021	Virgin Hotels Las Vegas, Paradise, Nevada, U.S.	Retained WBC Silver light welterweight title
37	Win	33–2 (2)	Ivan Baranchyk	KO	5 (10), 2:50	Oct 3, 2020	MGM Grand Conference Center, Paradise, Nevada, U.S.	Won vacant WBC Silver light welterweight title
36	Win	32–2 (2)	Kendo Castaneda	UD	10	Jul 7, 2020	MGM Grand Conference Center, Paradise, Nevada, U.S.	
35	Win	31–2 (2)	José Pedraza	UD	10	Sep 14, 2019	T-Mobile Arena, Paradise, Nevada, U.S.	Won vacant WBC-USNBC light welterweight title
34	NC	30–2 (2)	Eleazar Valenzuela	NC	3 (10), 3:00	May 18, 2019	Deportivo del Sindicato del Metro, Mexico City, Mexico	Fight stopped after accidental head clash
33	Loss	30–2 (1)	José Ramírez	MD	12	Feb 10, 2019	Save Mart Center, Fresno, California, U.S	For WBC light welterweight title
32	Win	30–1 (1)	Domicio Rondon	TKO	7 (10), 1:53	Oct 20, 2018	Gimnasio Municipal, Tecate, Mexico	
31	Win	29–1 (1)	Carlos Diaz Ramirez	KO	5 (10), 2:40	Jun 16, 2018	Gimnasio de Mexicali, Mexicali, Mexico	Won vacant WBA Inter-Continental lightweight title
30	Win	28–1 (1)	Abner Lopez	TKO	6 (10), 1:43	Nov 4, 2017	Estadio Chevron, Tijuana, Mexico	
29	Win	27–1 (1)	Miguel Zamudio	TKO	6 (10), 1:38	Jun 17, 2017	Palenque de Gallos, Comitán, Mexico	Won vacant WBO International light welterweight title
28	Win	26–1 (1)	Jesus Silveira	TD	5 (10), 3:00	Apr 1, 2017	Auditorio Fausto Gutierrez Moreno, Tijuana, Mexico	Unanimous TD after fight stopped due to accidental head clash
27	Win	25–1 (1)	Pedro Navarrete	UD	10	Apr 16, 2016	Gimnasio Olímpico, Mexico City, Mexico	
26	Win	24–1 (1)	Ammeth Diaz	TKO	1 (10), 1:49	Jan 23, 2016	Palenque Fex, Mexicali, Mexico	
25	NC	23–1 (1)	José Alfaro	NC	1 (10), 3:00	Oct 31, 2015	Auditorio Fausto Gutierrez Moreno, Tijuana, Mexico	Fight stopped after Zepeda cut from accidental head clash
24	Loss	23–1	Terry Flanagan	RTD	2 (12), 3:00	Jul 11, 2015	Velodrome, Manchester, England	For vacant WBO lightweight title
23	Win	23–0	Armando Robles	KO	1 (10), 0:44	Apr 25, 2015	Auditorio Fausto Gutierrez Moreno, Tijuana, Mexico	
22	Win	22–0	Orlando Vazquez	KO	2 (8), 2:03	Jan 17, 2015	Oceanview Pavilion, Port Hueneme, California, U.S.	
21	Win	21–0	Victor Cayo	KO	1 (10), 1:27	Nov 8, 2014	Gimnasio Nuevo León Unido, Monterrey, Mexico	
20	Win	20–0	Adrian Rodriguez Garza	KO	3 (8), 2:22	Aug 9, 2014	Civic Auditorium, Glendale, California, U.S.	
19	Win	19–0	Robert Frankel	UD	8	Apr 26, 2014	Oceanview Pavilion, Port Hueneme, California, U.S.	
18	Win	18–0	Johnnie Edwards	TKO	2 (8), 2:10	Mar 1, 2014	Alamodome, San Antonio, Texas, U.S.	
17	Win	17–0	Emanuel Lopez	KO	3 (10), 2:59	Dec 21, 2013	Agua Caliente Racetrack, Tijuana, Mexico	
16	Win	16–0	Luis Arceo	TKO	3 (6), 2:04	Oct 11, 2013	Thomas & Mack Center, Paradise, Nevada, U.S.	
15	Win	15–0	Ricardo Domínguez	TKO	3 (8), 2:43	Jul 13, 2013	Forum Tecate, Tijuana, Mexico	
14	Win	14–0	Rodolfo Quintanilla	TKO	5 (8), 1:52	Nov 24, 2012	Agua Caliente Racetrack, Tijuana, Mexico	
13	Win	13–0	Jovany Javier Gomez	TKO	1 (8), 2:30	Oct 20, 2012	Plaza de Toros Calafia, Mexicali, Mexico	
12	Win	12–0	Cristian Favela	TKO	6 (8), 2:11	Sep 21, 2012	Centro Recreativo Juventud 2000, Mexicali, Mexico	
11	Win	11–0	Roberto Hernandez	TKO	1 (8), 1:10	Sep 8, 2012	Hotel Hacienda Coral, San Felipe, Mexico	
10	Win	10–0	Abraham Alvarez	TKO	6 (8), 1:57	Jun 2, 2012	El Foro, Tijuana, Mexico	
9	Win	9–0	Sergio Joel De la Torre	TKO	2 (6), 1:34	Mar 16, 2012	Quiet Cannon, Montebello, California, U.S.	
8	Win	8–0	Luis Rey Campoa	KO	1 (6), 1:46	Dec 10, 2011	Plaza de Toros Calafia, Mexicali, Mexico	
7	Win	7–0	Arron Robinson	KO	1 (4), 2:25	Sep 23, 2011	Commerce Casino, Commerce, California, U.S.	
6	Win	6–0	Yakub Shidaev	UD	6	May 19, 2011	Lakeside Golf Course, Burbank, California, U.S.	
5	Win	5–0	Manuel Delcid	UD	4	Dec 18, 2010	Club 401, Ontario, California, U.S.	
4	Win	4–0	Alejandro Alonso	RTD	1 (4), 3:00	May 28, 2010	Centro de Espectáculos Promocasa, Mexicali, Mexico	
3	Win	3–0	Manuel Ruiz	TKO	1 (4), 2:50	May 7, 2010	Salón Social Posada del Mar, San Felipe, Mexico	
2	Win	2–0	Jesus Gonzalez	KO	1 (4), 1:53	Feb 12, 2010	Gimnasio de Mexicali, Mexicali, Mexico	
1	Win	1–0	Ignacio Mondragon	KO	1 (4), 2:36	Dec 25, 2009	El Nido Sports Center, Mexicali, Mexico	

Sporting positions
Vacant Title last held by Josh Taylor	WBC Silver light-welterweight champion October 3, 2020 – July 2022; Vacated	Vacant Title next held by Sergey Lipinets
