= Mikkel LesPierre =

American boxer

Personal information
- Nickname: Slikk Mikk
- Nationality: American
- Born: March 5, 1985 (age 41) Trinidad and Tobago
- Height: 5 ft 8 in (173 cm)
- Weight: Light welterweight

Boxing career
- Reach: 70 in (178 cm)
- Stance: Southpaw

Boxing record
- Total fights: 26
- Wins: 22
- Win by KO: 10
- Losses: 3
- Draws: 1

Mikkel LesPierre (born March 5, 1985) is an American professional boxer who challenged for the WBO light welterweight title in 2019. Alongside boxing he works full-time as a data specialist at Mount Sinai Hospital in New York City.

== Early life ==
LesPierre was born in Trinidad and Tobago and moved to the United States at the age of six. He was raised in the East Flatbush neighborhood of Brooklyn, New York.

As a youngster, LesPierre was fond of basketball, but he was unable to fulfill his potential and never got an opportunity to play in high school. He used to spend his time on the streets and picked up bad habits that led to poor academic performance and irregular attendance.

He was introduced to boxing by his friend’s father, but LesPierre did not take it seriously. He then entered college, and finally, at the age of 19, he took up boxing. He dropped out of college and directed his efforts to develop boxing skills.

== Personal life ==
As of June 20, 2018, LesPierre is residing in New York City. He has been working as a full-time data specialist in the ENT department at Mt. Sinai Hospital for more than ten years. He completes his eight-hour shift and then heads to the Gleason’s Gym. He assisted doctors and nurses at Mt. Sinai Hospital in during the COVID-19 pandemic in May 2020. He helped in setting up equipment, preparing ICUs, and provided medical supplies.

== Amateur career ==
As an amateur boxer, he was trained by Mike Smith. LesPierre appeared in 49 fights as an amateur, with 36 wins and 13 losses. He won open class titles in the Metros and Empire State Games as an amateur fighter. In 2010, he was a quarterfinalist at Police Athletic League National. He was able to make it to the finals of the New York Golden Gloves in 2011. He also participated in the 2012 Olympic Trials.

== Professional career ==
After five years, in 2012, he turned pro and entered the club show mix at the age of 27. His debut match was against Miguel Antonio Rodriquez that took place on June 8, 2012. He won his debut fight through TKO. His second fight as a pro was against Cornelius Whitlock, which resulted in a tie.

The light welterweight contender's career includes a series of boxing exhibitions in which he uses his mechanical southpaw style to win matches. Due to his fighting technique of smooth counter-punching, he came to be known as Mikkel "Slikk Mikk" LesPierre.

On February 7, 2018, he fought in a match against Noel Murphy in New York City. He won the 10-round boxing match, and it gave his career a boost. On June 21, 2018, he defeated Gustavo David Vittori in the seventh round in Queens.

In 2019, he stood at the 14th rank of WBO fighters.

On March 9, 2019, LesPierre lost by decision to WBO light welterweight titleholder, Maurice Hooker, in Verona, New York. He fought against Roody Pierre Paul on December 5 and won by unanimous decision.

On August 3, 2021, Mikkel fought Chris Algieri at Madison Square Garden and lost by decision.

Mikkel's last 3 fights have all been Wins. He currently trains with Joan Guzmán and the Guzman Brothers and manages himself.

=== Awards and titles ===
Mikkel won the vacant WBC FECARBOX light welterweight title on December 12, 2017, when he defeated Mario Beltre. On February 7, 2018, he defeated Noel Murphy and won vacant WBC United States (USNBC) light welterweight title.

LesPierre received the Heroes for Humanity Award by WBC on May 15, 2020.
