= Sean Noakes =

English boxer (born 1995)

Personal information
- Nickname: The Nightmare
- Nationality: English
- Born: 12 June 1995 (age 31)
- Weight: Welterweight

Boxing career
- Stance: Orthodox

Boxing record
- Total fights: 13
- Wins: 12
- Win by KO: 5
- Losses: 1

Sean Noakes (born 12 June 1995) is an English professional boxer. He is a former English welterweight champion.

== Career ==
After an amateur career boxing out of Westree ABC in Maidstone, Noakes turned professional in 2022, signing a four-year contract with Frank Warren's Queensbury Promotions. He made his pro-debut at York Hall in London on 20 May that year, defeating Lee Hallett on points in a four-round contest.

Noakes fought Inder Bassi for the vacant English welterweight title at The O2 Arena in London on 27 July 2024, winning the bout via unanimous decision.

He successfully defended his title with a unanimous decision win over the previously unbeaten Mathew Rennie on the undercard of the Zhilei Zhang vs Joe Joyce rematch at Wembley Arena on 7 December 2024.

Noakes made the second defense of his title against Jermaine Osbourne-Edwards at York Hall on 7 March 2025. He won by stoppage in the eighth round. Noakes vacated the title shortly afterwards.

On 18 July 2026, Noakes challenged unbeaten IBF European welterweight champion Kieran Molloy at the Copper Box Arena in London. He lost the fight by technical knockout in the eighth round to suffer his first professional defeat.

== Personal life ==
Noakes' brother Sam is also a professional boxer.

== Professional boxing record ==
13 fights	12 wins	1 loss
By knockout	5	1
By decision	7	0

No.	Result	Record	Opponent	Type	Round, time	Date	Location	Notes
13	Loss	12–1	Kieran Molloy	TKO	8 (10), 1:58	18 Jul 2026	Copper Box Arena, London, England	For IBF European welterweight title
12	Win	12–0	Ezequiel Gregores	PTS	6	21 Mar 2026	Electric Ballroom, Camden Town, London, England	
11	Win	11–0	Jakub Laskowski	PTS	6	14 Nov 2025	Park Lane Hotel, London, England	
10	Win	10–0	Jermaine Osbourne-Edwards	TKO	8 (10), 2:07	7 Mar 2025	York Hall, London, England	Retained English welterweight title
9	Win	9–0	Matthew Rennie	UD	10	7 Dec 2024	Wembley Arena, London, England	Retained English welterweight title
8	Win	8–0	Inder Bassi	UD	10	27 Jul 2024	The O2 Arena, London, England	Won vacant English welterweight title
7	Win	7–0	Marian Wesołowski	TKO	3 (6), 0:55	22 Mar 2024	York Hall, London, England	
6	Win	6–0	Łukasz Barabasz	PTS	6	23 Sep 2023	Wembley Arena, London, England	
5	Win	5–0	Robin Zamora	TKO	1 (6), 0:42	12 May 2023	York Hall, London, England	
4	Win	4–0	Santiago Garces	KO	5 (6), 2:17	28 Jan 2023	Wembley Arena, London, England	
3	Win	3–0	Petar Aleksandrov	PTS	4	11 Nov 2022	York Hall, London, England	
2	Win	2–0	MJ Hall	TKO	2 (4), 2:45	16 Jul 2022	Copper Box Arena, London, England	
1	Win	1–0	Lee Hallett	PTS	4	20 May 2022	York Hall, London, England	
