= Josh Taylor (boxer) =

British boxer (born 1991)

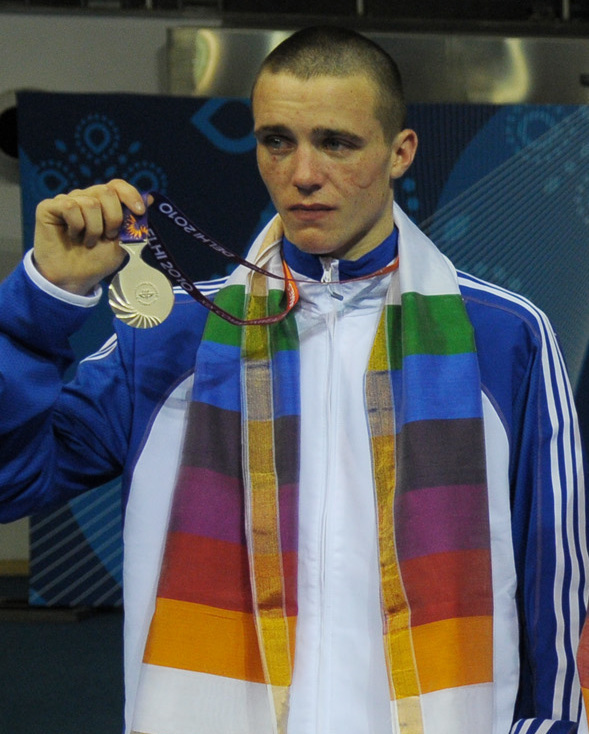
- Taylor after winning a silver medal for Scotland at the 2010 Commonwealth Games in Delhi

Personal information
- Nickname: The Tartan Tornado
- Born: 2 January 1991 (age 35) Prestonpans, East Lothian, UK
- Height: 5 ft 10 in (178 cm)
- Weight: Light-welterweight; Welterweight

Boxing career
- Reach: 69 1/2 in (177 cm)
- Stance: Southpaw

Boxing record
- Total fights: 22
- Wins: 19
- Win by KO: 13
- Losses: 3
Medal record
Men's amateur boxing
Representing Scotland
Commonwealth Games
Gold medal – first place	2014 Glasgow	Light-welterweight
Silver medal – second place	2010 Delhi	Lightweight
Commonwealth Youth Games
Silver medal – second place	2008 Pune	Lightweight
GB Championships
Silver medal – second place	2010 Liverpool	Lightweight
Silver medal – second place	2011 London	Light-welterweight

Josh Taylor (born 2 January 1991) is a Scottish former professional boxer who competed from 2015 to 2025. He is a former undisputed light-welterweight champion, having held the International Boxing Federation (IBF) and World Boxing Association (WBA) (Super version) titles between 2019 and 2022, the World Boxing Council (WBC) title between 2021 and 2022, the World Boxing Organisation (WBO) title between 2021 and 2023 and the Ring magazine title between 2019 and 2023. At regional level, he held the Commonwealth light-welterweight title from 2016 to 2017. As an amateur, he won a lightweight silver medal at the 2010 Commonwealth Games and light-welterweight gold at the 2014 edition.

From May 2021 to May 2022, Taylor reigned as the undisputed light-welterweight champion, unifying all four major titles in the division and being only the sixth male boxer to do so. With his win over José Ramírez in 2021, Taylor became the second Scotsman to be an undisputed champion and the first Briton to do so in the four-belt era.

Taylor was nicknamed "The Tartan Tornado" for his aggressive boxing style.

== Early life ==
Born in Prestonpans, Scotland, Taylor has a sister, Finch. As a child, he was passionate about motorcycle racing, and "dreamed about being a world champion superbike racer or a world champion MotoGP racer"; he named motorcycle racers Valentino Rossi and Steve Hislop as his childhood heroes.

== Amateur career ==
Taylor was a junior taekwondo champion, and turned to boxing at 15. He spent a short time at Meadowbank ABC and then moved onto Lochend ABC under coach Terry McCormack of Edinburgh. Taylor won a silver medal in the 2010 Commonwealth Games in Delhi, where he was beaten by Thomas Stalker in the lightweight final by 11–3.

Following the European Qualifying Event in Trabzon, Turkey, the ACB Lochend boxer qualified for the 2012 Summer Olympics in London, losing to number two seed Domenico Valentino in the round of 16. Taylor became the first lightweight Scottish boxer to qualify for the Olympics since Dick McTaggart, who won a gold medal in Melbourne in 1956 and a bronze in Rome at the following games.

He reached a Commonwealth Games final again in 2014, this time at light-welterweight. Taylor won the gold medal, defeating Junias Jonas of Namibia in the final. Taylor also represented the British Lionhearts at the World Series of Boxing.

== Professional career ==
=== Early career ===
Taylor started his professional career in June 2015, signing with Barry McGuigan's Cyclone Promotions, and was trained by Shane McGuigan. Taylor made his debut in July 2015, defeating Archie Weah with a second round technical knockout (TKO).

In his seventh fight, Taylor picked up the Commonwealth light-welterweight title by beating Dave Ryan with a fifth-round stoppage. Ryan went down twice over the course of the bout. Ryan had previously held the title between 2014 and 2015. Taylor won his first seven fights by knockout (KO). His KO streak came to an end against Alfonso Olvera, who went eight rounds with Taylor at the MGM Grand Garden Arena in Las Vegas on 28 January 2017. Taylor won the fight by unanimous decision (UD) with scores of 79–72, and 78–73 twice. On 24 March Taylor defended his Commonwealth title for the first time, beating Warren Joubert with a sixth-round TKO, after hurting him several times with left hooks. Joubert went down in round six and his corner threw in the towel.

=== Rise up the ranks ===
==== Taylor vs Davies ====
On 8 July Taylor faced WBC Silver champion and fellow unbeaten prospect Ohara Davies. The two had previously taunted each other on Twitter. Taylor would also be defending the Commonwealth title. Taylor dominated the fight and stopped Davies, dropping him once in round three and twice in round seven before the referee halted the contest.

==== Taylor vs Vázquez ====
Taylor defended his WBC Silver title against former lightweight world champion Miguel Vázquez on 11 November at the Royal Highland Centre. Although Vázquez' style seemed to pose problems for Taylor in the early rounds, Taylor wore him down as the fight went on. Vázquez went down in round nine from body shots, and he failed to beat the count. This was Vázquez' first stoppage loss.

On 18 January 2018 it was confirmed that Taylor would defend his WBC Silver light-welterweight title against veteran Humberto Soto on 3 March 2018, at the SSE Hydro in Glasgow. On 24 February 2018 it was revealed that Soto had sustained an injury whilst training meaning he had to pull out the fight. On the same day, Winston Campos was announced as his replacement.

==== Taylor vs Postol ====
In June 2018, Taylor fought former WBC light-welterweight champion, Viktor Postol, gaining a UD win in a twelve-round fight, meaning that he was placed in the mandatory position to fight WBC light-welterweight champion, José Ramírez. The fight took place at the SSE Hydro, Glasgow.

=== World Boxing Super Series ===
On 30 June 2018, it was announced that Taylor would join fellow light welterweights Ryan Martin, Terry Flanagan, Regis Prograis, Eduard Troyanovsky, Anthony Yigit, Ivan Baranchyk and WBA champion, Kiryl Relikh in the eight man tournament.

==== Taylor vs Martin ====
At a gala held in Moscow, Taylor was selected to fight Ryan Martin in the quarter-finals. Taylor dominated the fight with Martin throwing few punches. In the seventh round, Taylor landed a flurry of punches that staggered Martin which resulted in referee Victor Loughlin stopping the fight.

=== IBF light-welterweight champion ===
==== Taylor vs Baranchyk ====
Taylor won his first world title, the IBF light-welterweight title, by UD against Ivan Baranchyk in Glasgow on 18 May 2019. Taylor scored two knockdowns in the fight.

=== Unified light-welterweight champion ===
==== Taylor vs Prograis ====
Taylor won a unification bout against WBA (Super) light-welterweight champion Regis Prograis by majority decision (MD) in the final of the World Boxing Super Series at The O2 Arena in London on 26 October 2019. The fight was shown live on Sky Sports Box Office. Two judges scored the fight 117–112 and 115–113 in favour of Taylor while the third scored it a draw at 114–114. Taylor lifted the Muhammad Ali Trophy as the winner of the 2018-19 World Boxing Super Series – Light-welterweight division along with the vacant Ring magazine title.

==== Taylor vs Khongsong ====
In January 2020, Taylor signed a promotional deal with Top Rank and an advisory deal with MTK Global. In his next fight, the Scotsman defended his titles against undefeated challenger Apinun Khongsong on 26 September 2020 at York Hall, London. Taylor did not waste any time, dropping and stopping Khongsong in the first round with a body shot. The time of stoppage was 2:41.

=== Undisputed light-welterweight champion ===
==== Taylor vs Ramírez ====
Taylor faced WBC and WBO champion José Ramírez on 22 May 2021, at the Virgin Hotels Las Vegas in Paradise, Nevada, for the undisputed light-welterweight title. Taylor knocked his opponent down twice in the sixth and seventh rounds, both times with his left hand, en route to a unanimous decision victory with all three judges scoring the bout 114–112 in his favour. The result meant that Taylor became the second Scotsman to be an undisputed champion (after Ken Buchanan); the first British fighter to become an undisputed champion in the four-belt era; and only the fifth man to do so after Bernard Hopkins, Jermain Taylor, Terence Crawford and Oleksandr Usyk.

==== Taylor vs. Catterall ====
Taylor's first defence of his undisputed light-welterweight title had been scheduled for 18 December 2021, against WBO mandatory challenger Jack Catterall at SSE Hydro in Glasgow. It was announced by Taylor on 21 October that he had suffered an injury, and thus the fight was postponed to 26 February 2022.

On the night, despite being knocked down by Catterall in the eighth round and being seemingly outboxed by the challenger, Taylor was handed a very controversial split decision victory, with scores of 114–111 and 113–112 in his favour, and 113–112 in favour of Catterall. According to CompuBox, Catterall landed more punches than Taylor in 11 out of 12 rounds. The challenger landed 120 of 525 (23%) total punches, and 81 of 267 (30%) of his power punches, with Taylor throwing and landing far fewer in comparison: 73 of 306 (24%) overall, and 57 of 179 (32%) on power shots. Former world cruiserweight champion and pundit Johnny Nelson stated, "It's decisions like this which turn casual fans off. Josh Taylor did not win that fight." The decision was labelled as "the biggest robbery in British boxing history". Irish bookmaker Paddy Power stated that they would be refunding all stakes placed by their customers on Catterall to win the bout, as it "was an absolute robbery". Despite the widespread public opinion, Taylor was defiant in his post-fight interview, saying, "I don't think there is any need for a rematch... I know I won the fight."

==== Taylor vs. Lopez ====
On 8 April 2023 it was officially announced that Taylor would defend his WBO and The Ring light welterweight belts against former unified lightweight world champion Teofimo Lopez on 10 June at the Hulu Theater in New York City. Taylor lost by unanimous decision.

=== Post-title career ===
==== Taylor vs. Catterall II ====
On 27 April 2024 in Leeds, Taylor faced Jack Catterall in a rematch. He lost the fight by unanimous decision with the scores 117–111, 117–111 and 116–113.

==== Taylor vs. Essuman ====
Moving up to welterweight, Taylor lost to Ekow Essuman by unanimous decision at the SSE Hydro in Glasgow on 24 May 2025.

==== Retirement ====
Taylor announced his retirement from professional boxing on 21 July 2025, saying he was ending his career on medical advice due to a recurring eye injury.

== Personal life ==
Taylor is a fan of Hibernian F.C.

In December 2019, Taylor was arrested and charged with behaving in a threatening or abusive manner due to an incident whilst partying in Edinburgh. After being asked to leave a nightclub, he said a bouncer's "nose ring is gay", and referred to the bouncer as a "gay-looking cunt" and a "big orange-looking cunt". Taylor later pleaded guilty at Edinburgh Sheriff Court and was fined £350. He said on Twitter afterwards, "I whole heartedly apologise for my stupid actions. It has been a rollercoaster of a year for me, becoming unified world champion and on this occasion I've taken it too far."

On 31 December 2025 Taylor was involved in another drunken bar incident, in his hometown of Haddington where a pub brawl led to him being banned for life from the Victoria Inn.

== Professional boxing record ==
22 fights	19 wins	3 losses
By knockout	13	0
By decision	6	3

No.	Result	Record	Opponent	Type	Round, time	Date	Location	Notes
22	Loss	19–3	Ekow Essuman	UD	12	24 May 2025	OVO Hydro, Glasgow, Scotland	For vacant WBO Global welterweight title
21	Loss	19–2	Jack Catterall	UD	12	25 May 2024	First Direct Arena, Leeds, England	
20	Loss	19–1	Teofimo Lopez	UD	12	10 Jun 2023	Hulu Theater at Madison Square Garden, New York City, New York, U.S.	Lost WBO and The Ring light-welterweight titles
19	Win	19–0	Jack Catterall	SD	12	26 Feb 2022	OVO Hydro, Glasgow, Scotland	Retained WBA (Super), WBC, IBF, WBO, and The Ring light-welterweight titles
18	Win	18–0	José Ramírez	UD	12	22 May 2021	Virgin Hotels Las Vegas, Paradise, Nevada, US	Retained WBA (Super), IBF, and The Ring light-welterweight titles; Won WBC and WBO light-welterweight titles
17	Win	17–0	Apinun Khongsong	KO	1 (12), 2:41	26 Sep 2020	York Hall, London, England	Retained WBA (Super), IBF, and The Ring light-welterweight titles
16	Win	16–0	Regis Prograis	MD	12	26 Oct 2019	The O2 Arena, London, England	Retained IBF light-welterweight title; Won WBA (Super) and vacant The Ring light-welterweight titles; World Boxing Super Series: Light-welterweight final
15	Win	15–0	Ivan Baranchyk	UD	12	18 May 2019	SSE Hydro, Glasgow, Scotland	Won IBF light-welterweight title; World Boxing Super Series: Light-welterweight semi-final
14	Win	14–0	Ryan Martin	TKO	7 (12), 2:21	3 Nov 2018	SSE Hydro, Glasgow, Scotland	Retained WBC Silver light-welterweight title; World Boxing Super Series: Light-welterweight quarter-final
13	Win	13–0	Viktor Postol	UD	12	23 Jun 2018	SSE Hydro, Glasgow, Scotland	Retained WBC Silver light-welterweight title
12	Win	12–0	Winston Campos	TKO	3 (12), 0:44	3 Mar 2018	SSE Hydro, Glasgow, Scotland	Retained WBC Silver light-welterweight title
11	Win	11–0	Miguel Vázquez	KO	9 (12), 2:30	11 Nov 2017	Royal Highland Centre, Edinburgh, Scotland	Retained WBC Silver light-welterweight title
10	Win	10–0	Ohara Davies	TKO	7 (12), 2:25	8 Jul 2017	Braehead Arena, Glasgow, Scotland	Retained Commonwealth light-welterweight title; Won WBC Silver light-welterweight title
9	Win	9–0	Warren Joubert	TKO	6 (12), 1:27	24 Mar 2017	Meadowbank Stadium, Edinburgh, Scotland	Retained Commonwealth light-welterweight title
8	Win	8–0	Alfonso Olvera	UD	8	28 Jan 2017	MGM Grand Garden Arena, Paradise, Nevada, US	
7	Win	7–0	Dave Ryan	TKO	5 (12), 2:45	21 Oct 2016	Meadowbank Stadium, Edinburgh, Scotland	Won vacant Commonwealth light-welterweight title
6	Win	6–0	Evincii Dixon	RTD	2 (8), 3:00	30 Jul 2016	Barclays Center, Brooklyn, New York City, New York, US	
5	Win	5–0	Miguel Alberto González Mena	TKO	1 (6), 1:33	14 May 2016	Ice Arena Wales, Cardiff, Wales	
4	Win	4–0	Lyes Chaibi	KO	2 (6), 1:40	27 Feb 2016	Manchester Arena, Manchester, England	
3	Win	3–0	Daniel Cosmin Minescu	TKO	1 (4), 0:45	20 Nov 2015	Waterfront Hall, Belfast, Northern Ireland	
2	Win	2–0	Adam Mate	TKO	1 (6), 1:25	16 Oct 2015	Meadowbank Sports Centre, Edinburgh, Scotland	
1	Win	1–0	Archie Weah	TKO	2 (6), 1:53	18 Jul 2015	Don Haskins Center, El Paso, Texas, US	

== Titles in boxing ==
=== Major world titles ===
- WBA (Super) light welterweight champion (140 lbs)
- WBC light welterweight champion (140 lbs)
- IBF light welterweight champion (140 lbs)
- WBO light welterweight champion (140 lbs)

=== The Ring magazine titles ===
- The Ring light welterweight champion (140 lbs)

=== Silver world titles (Note: In 2010, the WBC created the "Silver Championship", intended as a replacement for interim titles.) ===
- WBC Silver light welterweight champion (140 lbs)

=== Regional/International titles ===
- Commonwealth light welterweight champion (140 lbs)

=== Undisputed titles ===
- Undisputed light welterweight champion

=== Honorary titles ===
- WBC Diamond light welterweight champion

== Pay-per-view bouts ==
United Kingdom
Date	Fight	Buys	Network
26 October 2019	Regis Prograis vs. Josh Taylor	176,000	Sky Box Office

== See also ==
- List of world light-welterweight boxing champions
- List of undisputed world boxing champions
- List of WBA world champions
- List of WBC world champions
- List of IBF world champions
- List of WBO world champions
- List of The Ring world champions
- List of Commonwealth Boxing Council champions
- Boxing at the 2012 Summer Olympics
- List of southpaw stance boxers

== Notes and references ==
=== References ===
Sporting positions
Regional boxing titles
Vacant Title last held by John Wayne Hibbert	Commonwealth light-welterweight champion 21 October 2016 – January 2018; Vacated	Vacant Title next held by Glenn Foot
Preceded by Ohara Davies	WBC Silver light-welterweight champion 8 July 2017 – May 2019; Vacated	Vacant Title next held by Jose Zepeda
World boxing titles
Preceded by Ivan Baranchyk	IBF light-welterweight champion 18 May 2019 – 24 August 2022; Vacated	Vacant Title next held by Subriel Matías
Preceded by Regis Prograis as World champion	WBA light-welterweight champion Super title 26 October 2019 – 14 May 2022; Stripped	Vacant Title next held by Alberto Puello as World champion
Vacant Title last held by Terence Crawford	The Ring light-welterweight champion 26 October 2019 – 10 June 2023	Succeeded by Teofimo Lopez
Preceded by José Ramírez	WBC light-welterweight champion 22 May 2021 – 1 July 2022; Vacated	Vacant Title next held by Regis Prograis
Preceded by José Ramírez	WBO light-welterweight champion 22 May 2021 – 10 June 2023	Succeeded by Teofimo Lopez
Vacant Title last held by Terence Crawford	Undisputed light-welterweight champion 22 May 2021 – 14 May 2022; Titles fragmented	Vacant
