= Apinun Khongsong =

Thai boxer

Apinan Kongsong (อภินันท์ คงสง)
Personal information
- Nicknames: Dawrung phi-phungtai (ดาวรุ่งผีพุ่งไต้) "The Rising Meteor"
- Nationality: Thai
- Born: July 14, 1995 (age 30) Tambon Lamphu Ra, Amphoe Huai Yot, Trang Province, Thailand
- Height: 5 ft 10 in (178 cm)
- Weight: Light-welterweight

Boxing career
- Stance: Orthodox

Boxing record
- Total fights: 29
- Wins: 25
- Win by KO: 21
- Losses: 4

Apinun Khongsong (Thai: อภินันท์ คงสง, born 14 July 1995), also known professionally as Downua Ruawaiking (ดาวเหนือ เรือไวกิ้ง), is a Thai professional boxer who challenged for the unified WBA (Super), IBF, and The Ring light-welterweight titles in September 2020.

== Early life ==
Khongsong was born in Tambon Lamphu Ra, Huai Yot District, Trang Province, about 14 km (8.7 mi) north of Trang City. He has competed in over 100 bouts, from Muay Thai to amateur boxing, and is an athlete at Trang Sports School. He is a sports athlete at Trang Sports School.

== Boxing career ==
He made his professional boxing debut in mid-2016 under Ekarat "Jimmy" Chaichotchuang of Kiat Kreerin Promotion, with British trainer Rian Munton. On 22 February 2017, in just his seventh fight, he captured the vacant IBF Pan Pacific title by knocking out Japanese boxer Yuta Maruoka in the first round.

On 23 August 2017, he won the vacant IBF Asia light-welterweight title by unanimous decision over Filipino challenger Adam Diu "Big Daddy" Abdulhamid at Suan Lum Night Bazaar, Ratchadaphisek.

On 18 February 2019, he faced Japanese fighter Akihiro Kondo in an IBF junior welterweight world title eliminator. Khongsong delivered a right uppercut that knocked Kondo out in the fifth round at Korakuen Hall, Tokyo.

He suffered his first career loss on 26 September 2020, when he was defeated by Josh Taylor via a first-round knockout in a unification bout for the WBA (Super), IBF, and The Ring light-welterweight titles at York Hall, London. For this fight, he was trained by Amnat Ruenroeng, a former IBF flyweight champion and two-time Olympic competitor, who guided him through the preparations for the high-stakes bout.

Some time after the fight, Khongsong publicly questioned the terms of his purse, which was reportedly set at £500,000 (around 20 million baht) according to the contract. He claimed, however, that he had never seen the contract himself and called on the promotion team to clarify the matter.

== Professional boxing record ==
27 fights	23 wins	4 losses
By knockout	19	4
By decision	4	0

No.	Result	Record	Opponent	Type	Round, time	Date	Location	Notes
27	Win	23–4	Thongnin Xayyaseng	UD	6	5 Oct 2024	Spaceplus Bangkok RCA, Bangkok, Thailand	
26	Loss	22–4	Amirhossein Arzi	KO	1 (6), 2:22	29 Aug 2024	Spaceplus Bangkok RCA, Bangkok, Thailand	
25	Win	22–3	Peeraphat Tobua	TKO	3 (6), 0:38	13 Jul 2024	IS FCC Pattaya, Pattaya, Thailand	
24	Win	21–3	Suntorn Panhom	TKO	3 (8), 0:43	14 Jan 2023	Singmanssak Muaythai School, Pathum Thani, Thailand	
23	Loss	20–3	Xolisani Ndongeni	KO	7 (10), 2:06	17 Nov 2022	Durban Casino, Durban, South Africa	
22	Win	20–2	Phairat Aimong	TKO	2 (8), 2:06	11 Aug 2022	Singmanssak Muaythai School, Pathum Thani, Thailand	
21	Win	19–2	Wutthiphong Tunkam	TKO	3 (6), 1:05	22 Jul 2022	Singmanssak Muaythai School, Pathum Thani, Thailand	
20	Loss	18–2	Steve Spark	TKO	3 (8), 2:11	11 Jun 2022	Rumours International, Toowoomba, Australia	
19	Win	18–1	Tanpisit Chairach	TKO	3 (6), 2:00	10 Apr 2022	Singmanssak Muaythai School, Pathum Thani, Thailand	
18	Win	17–1	Somchai Srijan	TKO	5 (6), 1:30	20 Mar 2022	Singmanassak Muaythai School, Pathum Thani, Thailand	
17	Loss	16–1	Josh Taylor	KO	1 (12), 2:41	26 Sep 2020	York Hall, London, England	For WBA (Super), IBF and The Ring light-welterweight titles
16	Win	16–0	Yosmar Kefi	TKO	2 (8), 2:07	19 Jul 2019	Maelanoi Daroonsik School, Maehongson, Thailand	
15	Win	15–0	Akihiro Kondo	KO	5 (12), 1:47	18 Feb 2019	Korakuen Hall, Tokyo, Japan	
14	Win	14–0	Sonny Katiandagho	TKO	3 (12)	14 Dec 2018	Maejo University, Chiang Mai, Thailand	Retained IBF Pan Pacific light-welterweight title
13	Win	13–0	Ray Rahardjo	TKO	5 (12)	21 Nov 2018	Mautuenwittaya School, Li, Thailand	Retained IBF Pan Pacific light-welterweight title
12	Win	12–0	Jason Egera	KO	6 (8), 1:46	20 Jun 2018	Chinese Taipei Association, Samut Prakan, Thailand	
11	Win	11–0	Rusmin Kie Raha	KO	1 (8), 0:59	25 Apr 2018	Pone Kingpetch Memorial Park, Hua Hin, Thailand	
10	Win	10–0	Adam Diu Abdulhamid	UD	12	23 Aug 2017	Suan Lum Night Bazaar Ratchadaphisek, Bangkok, Thailand	Won vacant IBF Asia light-welterweight title
9	Win	9–0	Junar Adante	TKO	2 (12)	21 Jun 2017	Ratirat Village, Sai Noi, Thailand	Retained IBF Pan Pacific light-welterweight title
8	Win	8–0	Eddy Comaro	TKO	3 (6)	20 Apr 2017	Ratirat Village, Sai Noi, Thailand	
7	Win	7–0	Yuta Maruoka	TKO	1 (12), 1:32	22 Feb 2017	Barungkarn, Nonthaburi, Thailand	Won vacant IBF Pan Pacific light-welterweight title
6	Win	6–0	Heri Andriyanto	TKO	2 (6), 2:17	21 Dec 2016	Floating Market, Sai Noi, Thailand	
5	Win	5–0	Punchai Sithfasai	PTS	6	30 Nov 2016	Barungkarn, Nonthaburi, Thailand	
4	Win	4–0	Afanwi Kingsly Shu	KO	3 (6)	30 Sep 2026	Bangkok University, Thonburi Campus, Bangkok, Thailand	
3	Win	3–0	Matthis Bernot	PTS	6	12 Aug 2016	Wiang Sa, Thailand	
2	Win	2–0	Matthis Bernot	TKO	4 (6), 0:49	8 Jul 2016	Samroiyod Beach, Prachuap Khiri Khan, Thailand	
1	Win	1–0	Pattapol Rajlampang	TKO	1 (4)	10 Jun 2016	Maejo University, Chiang Mai, Thailand	
