= Montana Love =

American boxer (born 1995)

Personal information
- Nickname: Too Pretty
- Born: Montana Colton Love; January 7, 1995 (age 31) Cleveland, Ohio, U.S.
- Height: 5 ft 7 3/4 in (172 cm)
- Weight: Light welterweight

Boxing career
- Reach: 68 1/2 in (174 cm)
- Stance: Southpaw

Boxing record
- Total fights: 21
- Wins: 18
- Win by KO: 9
- Losses: 2
- Draws: 1

Montana Colton Love (born January 7, 1995) is a retired American professional boxer.

== Professional career ==
Love made his professional debut against Willie Miller on April 11, 2015, scoring a third-round disqualification victory at the Stafford Center in Stafford, Texas.

After compiling a record of 11–0 (5 KOs), Love faced Kenneth Sims Jr. for the vacant WBC Youth Silver light welterweight title on July 20, 2018, at the WinnaVegas Casino & Resort in Sloan, Iowa. The bout ended in a split draw, with one judge scoring the bout 77–75 in favor of Love, another scoring it 77–75 in favor of Sims, while the third judge scored it even at 76–76.

Following four more wins, two by stoppage, Love faced former world champion Ivan Baranchyk as part of the undercard for Jake Paul vs. Tyron Woodley on August 29, 2021, at the Rocket Mortgage FieldHouse in Cleveland, Ohio. Love won the bout via seventh-round corner retirement (RTD).

After a third-round technical knockout (TKO) victory against Carlos Diaz in December 2021, Love faced Gabriel Gollaz as part of the undercard for Canelo Álvarez vs. Dmitry Bivol on May 7, 2022, at the T-Mobile Arena in Paradise, Nevada. Love won the bout via unanimous decision (UD) with all three judges scoring the contest 114–112.

On November 12, 2022, Love lost a fight by disqualification to Steve Spark in Cleveland. Love was dropped by Spark in the second round but recovered. In the sixth round, an inadvertent head butt opened a cut over Love's left eye, leading to a momentary stoppage. Shortly after the fight resumed, Love and Spark were caught in a clinch, and Love drove Spark to the ropes, where Spark was flipped over the top rope and out of the ring. Referee David Fields disqualified Love for shoving Spark, ending the fight. Subsequently, both Love and promoter Eddie Hearn objected to the referee's decision to disqualify Love, arguing that Love pushed Spark inadvertently and did not intend to push him out of the ring.

== Professional boxing record ==
21 fights	18 wins	2 losses
By knockout	9	1
By decision	8	0
By disqualification	1	1
Draws	1	

No.	Result	Record	Opponent	Type	Round, time	Date	Location	Notes
21	Loss	18–2–1	Liam Paro	KO	6 (10), 1:49	9 Dec 2023	Chase Center, San Francisco, California U.S.	For WBO Global junior welterweight title
20	Loss	18–1–1	Steve Spark	DQ	6 (12), 1:23	12 Nov 2022	Rocket Mortgage FieldHouse, Cleveland, Ohio, U.S.	Love was disqualified for throwing Spark out of the ring.
19	Win	18–0–1	Gabriel Gollaz Valenzuela	UD	12	May 7, 2022	T-Mobile Arena, Paradise, Nevada, U.S.	Won IBF North American light welterweight title
18	Win	17–0–1	Carlos Diaz	TKO	1 (12), 1:22	Dec 4, 2021	MGM Grand Garden Arena, Paradise, Nevada, U.S.	
17	Win	16–0–1	Ivan Baranchyk	RTD	7 (10), 3:00	Aug 29, 2021	Rocket Mortgage FieldHouse, Cleveland, Ohio, U.S.	
16	Win	15–0–1	Olaide Fijabi	RTD	2 (8), 3:00	Jun 5, 2021	Hilton Al Habtoor City, Dubai, UAE	
15	Win	14–0–1	Cameron Krael	UD	6	Apr 3, 2021	Buckhead Fight Club, Atlanta, Georgia, U.S.	
14	Win	13–0–1	Jerrico Walton	UD	8	Feb 14, 2020	2300 Arena, Philadelphia, Pennsylvania, U.S.	
13	Win	12–0–1	Michael Ogundo	TKO	2 (6), 1:37	Aug 3, 2019	Euclid High School Stadium, Cleveland, Ohio, U.S.	
12	Draw	11–0–1	Kenneth Sims Jr	SD	8	Jul 20, 2018	WinnaVegas Casino & Resort, Sloan, Iowa, U.S.	For vacant WBC Youth Silver light welterweight title
11	Win	11–0	Ricardo Garcia	UD	8	May 5, 2018	Bulldog Arena, Johnstown, Pennsylvania, U.S.	
10	Win	10–0	John David Charles	KO	2 (6), 1:45	Mar 10, 2018	Eagles Club, Lebanon, Pennsylvania, U.S.	
9	Win	9–0	Samuel Teah	MD	8	Feb 2, 2018	WinnaVegas Casino & Resort, Sloan, Iowa, U.S.	
8	Win	8–0	Wilfredo Acuna	UD	6	Nov 22, 2017	Mountaineer Casino Ballroom, New Cumberland, West Virginia, U.S.	
7	Win	7–0	Jamar Saunders	RTD	3 (6), 3:00	Sep 3, 2017	Mountaineer Casino Ballroom, New Cumberland, West Virginia, U.S.	
6	Win	6–0	Jorge Luis Munguia	TKO	3 (4), 1:37	Jun 9, 2017	Atrium Arena, Stone Mountain, Georgia, U.S.	
5	Win	5–0	Vladimir Pierre	UD	4	May 6, 2017	Sports Center, Butler, Pennsylvania, U.S.	
4	Win	4–0	Charles Stanford	TKO	3 (4), 0:58	Mar 18, 2017	Bayfront Convention Center, Erie, Pennsylvania, U.S.	
3	Win	3–0	Terrell Houston	UD	4	Feb 18, 2017	Atrium Arena, Stone Mountain, Georgia, U.S.	
2	Win	2–0	Cordarrius Mann	KO	1 (4), 2:59	Nov 26, 2016	Firebird Athletic Center, Bedford, Ohio, U.S.	
1	Win	1–0	Willie Miller	DQ	3 (4), 1:00	Apr 11, 2015	Stafford Center, Stafford, Texas, U.S.	
