= Izzy Asif =

English boxing promotor (born 1983)

Personal information
- Born: Issrar Asif; 30 March 1983 (age 43) Sheffield, Yorkshire, England
- Height: 6 ft 3 in (191 cm)
- Weight: Cruiserweight

Boxing career
- Stance: Orthodox

Boxing record
- Total fights: 4
- Wins: 3
- Win by KO: 0
- Losses: 1

Izzy Asif (born 30 March 1983) is an English boxing promoter and former professional boxer.

== Biography ==
Born in Sheffield, Asif's family emigrated to England from Kahuta in Pakistan. He started boxing in 2002 and won three of his four professional fights at cruiserweight before retiring in 2012.

Having worked in property development, Asif was drawn back into boxing when former world champion Amir Khan asked him to help out with his training for a fight against Billy Dib in 2019. He founded GBM Sports in 2022, with the company promoting its first show at the Magna Centre in Rotherham on 11 March 2022.

In June 2024, GBM signed a multi-fight contract with sports streaming platform DAZN. The company staged its first outdoor stadium show at the Eco-Power Stadium in Doncaster on 23 May 2025, headlined by the WBO female lightweight title fight between champion Terri Harper and challenger Natalie Zimmermann.

== Professional boxing record ==
4 fights	3 wins	1 loss
By knockout	0	1
By decision	3	0

No.	Result	Record	Opponent	Type	Round, time	Date	Location	Notes
4	Win	3–1	Verban Borisov	PTS	4	3 Mar 2012	Hillsborough Leisure Centre, Sheffield, England	
3	Loss	2–1	Carl Wilson	TKO	2 (6), 1:00	30 Apr 2011	Don Valley Stadium, Sheffield, England	
2	Win	2–0	Lee Mountford	PTS	6	17 Apr 2010	Sheffield City Hall, Sheffield, England	
1	Win	1–0	Mark Lewis	PTS	6	20 Feb 2010	Sheffield City Hall, Sheffield, England	
