= Ivan Baranchyk =

Belarusian boxer

Personal information
- Nickname: The Beast
- Nationality: Belarusian
- Born: 24 January 1993 (age 33) Amursk, Russia
- Height: 5 ft 8 in (173 cm)
- Weight: Light-welterweight; Welterweight

Boxing career
- Reach: 67 1/2 in (171 cm)
- Stance: Orthodox

Boxing record
- Total fights: 23
- Wins: 20
- Win by KO: 13
- Losses: 3

Ivan Baranchyk (born 24 January 1993) is a Belarusian professional boxer who held the IBF light-welterweight title from 2018 to 2019.

== Professional career ==
=== Baranchyk vs. Yigit ===
Baranchyk amassed a record of 18–0 before entering season 2 of the World Boxing Super Series. In his opening round match-up, he defeated Anthony Yigit via seventh round corner retirement to win the vacant IBF light welterweight title.

=== Baranchyk vs. Taylor ===
In the semi-final of the World Boxing Super Series on 18 May 2019, Baranchyk faced Josh Taylor at The SSE Hydro in Glasgow, Scotland, where he suffered his first professional defeat, losing to Taylor via unanimous decision with scores of 115–111, 115–111, and 117–109.

=== Baranchyk vs. Bracero ===
Baranchyk rebounded from his loss against Taylor with a fourth-round technical knockout victory against Gabriel Bracero on 5 October 2019, on the undercard of Gennady Golovkin vs. Sergiy Derevyanchenko.

=== Baranchyk vs. Zepeda ===
Baranchyk went on to lose his next two bouts, first one against Jose Zepeda on 3 October 2020 via fifth-round knockout. Zepeda was ranked #2 by the WBC, #3 by the WBO and #6 by The Ring at super lightweight.

=== Baranchyk vs. Love ===
In his next bout Baranchyk lost by Montana Love on 29 August 2021 via seventh-round corner retirement.

== Professional boxing record ==
23 fights	20 wins	3 losses
By knockout	13	2
By decision	7	1

No.	Result	Record	Opponent	Type	Round, time	Date	Location	Notes
23	Loss	20–3	Montana Love	RTD	7 (10), 3:00	29 Aug 2021	Rocket Mortgage FieldHouse, Cleveland, Ohio, US	
22	Loss	20–2	Jose Zepeda	KO	5 (10), 2:50	3 Oct 2020	MGM Grand Conference Center, Paradise, Nevada, US	For vacant WBC Silver light-welterweight title
21	Win	20–1	Gabriel Bracero	TKO	4 (10), 1:30	5 Oct 2019	Madison Square Garden, New York City, New York, US	Won vacant WBA Inter-Continental light-welterweight title
20	Loss	19–1	Josh Taylor	UD	12	18 May 2019	The SSE Hydro, Glasgow, Scotland	Lost IBF light-welterweight title; World Boxing Super Series: Light-welterweight semi-final
19	Win	19–0	Anthony Yigit	RTD	7 (12), 3:00	27 Oct 2018	Lakefront Arena, New Orleans, Louisiana, US	Won vacant IBF light-welterweight title; World Boxing Super Series: Light-welterweight quarter-final
18	Win	18–0	Petr Petrov	TKO	8 (12), 1:12	9 Mar 2018	Deadwood Mountain Grand, Deadwood, South Dakota, US	
17	Win	17–0	Keenan Smith	UD	8	14 Jul 2017	Buffalo Run Casino, Miami, Oklahoma, US	
16	Win	16–0	Abel Ramos	UD	10	10 Feb 2017	Buffalo Run Casino, Miami, Oklahoma, US	Retained IBF-USBA light-welterweight title
15	Win	15–0	Wilberth Lopez	UD	10	10 Dec 2016	Buffalo Run Casino, Miami, Oklahoma, US	
14	Win	14–0	Zhimin Wang	UD	10	23 Sep 2016	Buffalo Run Casino, Miami, Oklahoma, US	Won vacant IBF-USBA and WBC–USNBC light-welterweight titles
13	Win	13–0	Eliseo Cruz Sesma	TKO	3 (8), 1:07	25 Jun 2016	Buffalo Run Casino, Miami, Oklahoma, US	
12	Win	12–0	Nicholas Givan	KO	1 (8), 0:21	25 Mar 2016	Buffalo Run Casino, Oklahoma, Oklahoma, US	Won vacant WBC–USNBC light-welterweight title
11	Win	11–0	Shadi Shawareb	KO	1 (8), 2:28	11 Dec 2015	Bayou Event Center, Houston, Texas, US	
10	Win	10–0	Alfred Hall	KO	3 (6), 0:41	8 Jul 2015	BB King Blues Club & Grill, New York City, New York, US	
9	Win	9–0	Angel Figueroa	KO	1 (6), 0:03	20 Jun 2015	Martin's West, Woodlawn, Maryland, US	
8	Win	8–0	Damien Hill	TKO	1 (6), 1:19	28 Mar 2015	Resorts World Casino, New York City, New York, US	
7	Win	7–0	David Thomas	KO	2 (4), 2:07	20 Feb 2015	Hilton Westchester, Rye Brook, New York, US	
6	Win	6–0	Ian James	KO	1 (4), 1:55	29 Jan 2015	BB King Blues Club & Grill, New York City, New York, US	
5	Win	5–0	Alfonso Olvera	UD	4	3 Dec 2014	BB King Blues Club & Grill, New York City, New York, US	
4	Win	4–0	Christopher Haney	KO	1 (4), 0:45	13 Nov 2014	Baltimore Arena, Baltimore, Maryland, US	
3	Win	3–0	Leanid Hrybouski	TKO	4 (10)	26 Jun 2014	Olympic Sport Complex, Minsk, Belarus	Won vacant Belarus welterweight title
2	Win	2–0	Kirill Karnatski	PTS	4	8 Apr 2014	Olympic Sport Complex, Minsk, Belarus	
1	Win	1–0	Yuri Finski	PTS	4	25 Mar 2014	Olympic Sport Complex, Minsk, Belarus	

== See also ==
- List of light-welterweight boxing champions

Achievements
Vacant Title last held by Cleotis Pendarvis	IBF–USBA light welterweight champion 23 September 2016 – 27 October 2018; Won world title	Vacant Title next held by Sonny Fredrickson
Vacant Title last held by Mikey Garcia	IBF light welterweight champion 27 October 2018 – 18 May 2019	Succeeded by Josh Taylor
