= Maurice Hooker =

American boxer (born 1989)

Personal information
- Nickname: Mighty Mo
- Nationality: American
- Born: August 7, 1989 (age 37) Dallas, Texas, U.S.
- Height: 5 ft 11 in (180 cm)
- Weight: Light welterweight; Welterweight

Boxing career
- Reach: 80 in (203 cm)
- Stance: Orthodox

Boxing record
- Total fights: 33
- Wins: 27
- Win by KO: 18
- Losses: 3
- Draws: 3

Maurice Dewayne Hooker (born August 7, 1989) is an American professional boxer who held the WBO light welterweight title from 2018 to 2019 and challenged for the WBC light welterweight title in 2019.

== Professional career ==
=== Hooker vs. Flanagan ===
Hooker turned professional in 2011 and compiled a record of 23-0-3 before challenging and beating British boxer Terry Flanagan in an upset on June 9, 2018 for the vacant WBO light welterweight title in Manchester England on the Tyson Fury vs. Sefer Seferi undercard.

=== Hooker vs. Ramirez ===
On 27 July 2019, Hooker fought WBC super lightweight champion Jose Ramirez in a unification bout. Ramirez managed to get the better out of Hooker and won the fight via a sixth-round TKO.

=== Hooker vs. Perez ===
In his next fight, Hooker fought Uriel Perez. Hooker won the fight in the first round.

=== Hooker vs. Ortiz Jr ===
On 20 March 2021, Hooker fought Vergil Ortiz Jr, who was ranked #2 by the WBO and #6 by the WBC at welterweight. Ortiz Jr was the better man, first knocking Hooker down in the sixth round, before finishing him in the seventh with a TKO victory.

== Professional boxing record ==
33 fights	27 wins	3 losses
By knockout	18	2
By decision	9	1
Draws	3	

No.	Result	Record	Opponent	Type	Round, time	Date	Location	Notes
33	Loss	27–3–3	Blair Cobbs	UD	10	Aug 6, 2022	Dickies Arena, Fort Worth, Texas, U.S.	
32	Loss	27–2–3	Vergil Ortiz Jr.	TKO	7 (12), 0:36	Mar 20, 2021	Dickies Arena, Fort Worth, Texas, U.S.	For vacant WBO International welterweight title
31	Win	27–1–3	Uriel Perez	TKO	1 (10), 2:52	Dec 20, 2019	Talking Stick Resort Arena, Phoenix, Arizona, U.S.	
30	Loss	26–1–3	José Ramírez	TKO	6 (12), 1:48	Jul 27, 2019	College Park Center, Arlington, Texas, U.S.	Lost WBO light welterweight title; For WBC light welterweight title
29	Win	26–0–3	Mikkel LesPierre	UD	12	Mar 9, 2019	Turning Stone Resort Casino, Verona, New York, U.S.	Retained WBO light welterweight title
28	Win	25–0–3	Alex Saucedo	TKO	7 (12), 1:36	Nov 16, 2018	Chesapeake Energy Arena, Oklahoma City, Oklahoma, U.S.	Retained WBO light welterweight title
27	Win	24–0–3	Terry Flanagan	SD	12	Jun 9, 2018	Manchester Arena, Manchester, England	Won vacant WBO light welterweight title
26	Win	23–0–3	Courtney Jackson	UD	10	Aug 19, 2017	Omni Dallas Hotel, Dallas, Texas, U.S.	Retained WBO–NABO light welterweight title
25	Win	22–0–3	Cristóbal Cruz	UD	10	Feb 24, 2017	Salon Mezzanine, Tijuana, Mexico	
24	Draw	21–0–3	Darleys Pérez	SD	10	Nov 19, 2016	T-Mobile Arena, Paradise, Nevada, U.S.	Retained WBO–NABO light welterweight title
23	Win	21–0–2	Ty Barnett	KO	1 (10), 2:27	Aug 6, 2016	Oracle Arena, Oakland, California, U.S.	Retained WBO–NABO light welterweight title
22	Win	20–0–2	Wilfrido Buelvas	KO	1 (10), 2:27	Mar 26, 2016	Oracle Arena, Oakland, California, U.S.	
21	Win	19–0–2	Ghislain Maduma	SD	10	Oct 17, 2015	Madison Square Garden, New York City, New York, U.S.	Retained WBO–NABO light welterweight title
20	Win	18–0–2	Eduardo Galindo	TKO	6 (10), 3:10	Jun 26, 2015	Kay Bailey Hutchinson Convention Center, Dallas, Texas, U.S.	Won vacant WBO–NABO light welterweight title
19	Win	17–0–2	Santos Benavides	TKO	2 (8), 1:56	Mar 6, 2015	Kay Bailey Hutchinson Convention Center, Dallas, Texas, U.S.	
18	Win	16–0–2	Gary Bergeron	TKO	2 (6), 2:12	Nov 22, 2014	Kay Bailey Hutchinson Convention Center, Dallas, Texas, U.S.	
17	Win	15–0–2	Carlos Valenzuela	TKO	1 (6), 2:37	Aug 22, 2014	Renaissance Worthington Hotel, Fort Worth, Texas, U.S.	
16	Win	14–0–2	Lauro Alcantar	TKO	1 (6), 2:17	Jul 11, 2014	Fantasy Springs Resort Casino, Indio, California, U.S.	
15	Win	13–0–2	Adrian Rodriguez Garza	UD	6	Apr 26, 2014	Fitzgerald's Casino & Hotel, Tunica, Mississippi, U.S.	
14	Draw	12–0–2	Abel Ramos	MD	8	Jan 27, 2014	Cook Convention Center, Memphis, Tennessee, U.S.	
13	Win	12–0–1	Rynell Griffin	UD	6	Sep 26, 2013	Four Points Sheraton Hotel, San Diego, California, U.S.	
12	Win	11–0–1	John Revish	KO	1 (6), 2:08	Aug 23, 2013	Worthington Hotel, Fort Worth, Texas, U.S.	
11	Win	10–0–1	Mario Hermosillo	KO	1 (6), 2:20	Jul 25, 2013	Four Points Sheraton Hotel, San Diego, California, U.S.	
10	Win	9–0–1	John Montes	TKO	6 (6), 1:34	Jun 8, 2013	Beamers Nightclub, Dallas, Texas, U.S.	
9	Win	8–0–1	Adam Ealoms	KO	2 (6), 1:44	Apr 29, 2013	Cendera Center, Fort Worth, Texas, U.S.	
8	Win	7–0–1	Cameron Krael	UD	4	Dec 19, 2012	Roseland Ballroom, New York City, New York, U.S.	
7	Win	6–0–1	DeAnthony Bonner	KO	1 (4), 1:52	Aug 24, 2012	Worthington Hotel, Fort Worth, Texas, U.S.	
6	Win	5–0–1	Julian Rodriguez	KO	1 (4), 2:10	Aug 11, 2012	Convention Center, Arlington, Texas, U.S.	
5	Win	4–0–1	Pedro Dominguez	TKO	1 (4), 0:13	Jun 29, 2012	Kay Yeager Coliseum, Wichita Falls, Texas, U.S.	
4	Win	3–0–1	Demond Brock	UD	4	Jun 8, 2012	Festival Plaza, Shreveport, Louisiana, U.S.	
3	Win	2–0–1	Martin Gomez	TKO	2 (4), 1:37	Jul 22, 2011	North Austin Event Center, Austin, Texas, U.S.	
2	Win	1–0–1	Wilbert Mitchell	KO	1 (4), 1:43	Jun 24, 2011	Dr Pepper Arena, Frisco, Texas, U.S.	
1	Draw	0–0–1	Tyrone Chatman	SD	4	Apr 29, 2011	Orpheum Theater, St. Louis, Missouri, U.S	

== See also ==
- List of light-welterweight boxing champions

Achievements
Vacant Title last held by Terence Crawford	WBO light welterweight champion June 9, 2018 – July 27, 2019	Succeeded by José Ramírez
