= Viktor Postol =

Ukrainian boxer

Viktor Postol Віктор Постол
Personal information
- Nickname: The Iceman
- Nationality: Ukrainian
- Born: Viktor Vasylovych Postol; 16 January 1984 (age 42) Velyka Dymerka, Ukrainian SSR, Soviet Union
- Height: 1.80 m (5 ft 11 in)
- Weight: Light-welterweight

Boxing career
- Reach: 187 cm (74 in)
- Stance: Orthodox

Boxing record
- Total fights: 37
- Wins: 32
- Win by KO: 12
- Losses: 5

Viktor Vasylovych Postol (Ukrainian: Віктор Васильович Постол; born 16 January 1984) is a Ukrainian professional boxer who held the WBC light-welterweight title from 2015 to 2016.

== Professional career ==
=== Early career ===
Postol made his professional debut on 1 October 2007 at the age of 23 against Zsolt Vicze, stopping him in round 2. He won his next fourteen bouts fighting in countries Bosnia and Herzegovina, Ukraine, Spain, Russia and Georgia. Postol's first significant title fight came in December 2011 against Karen Tevosyan for the vacant WBC Silver International light welterweight title. Postol managed to win via unanimous decision to claim the belt. He then successfully defended it against Yvan Mendy and DeMarcus Corley.

After vacating the belt, it was announced in February 2013 that Postol would next fight American boxer Hank Lundy for the vacant WBC International light welterweight title. Lundy was originally due to fight Lucas Matthysse, but the fight fell apart. Postol won the bout via a 12-round unanimous decision. Two judges scored the fight 116-112 and the remaining judge scored it 116-113 all in Postol's favour. Before vacating the belt, Postol had managed to retain it against Ignacio Mendoza.

On 7 November 2013, the World Boxing Council ordered a final eliminator for their super lightweight title, held at the time by unified champion Danny García, which would see Postol fight Turkish boxer Selçuk Aydin (26-2, 19 KOs). Before engaging in the eliminator, Postol finished the year with a dominant decision win over tough journeyman Behzod Nabiyev (22-6-1, 16 KOs) at the SportLife club in Kyiv, Ukraine. Over 10 rounds, Nabiyev was dropped once in round 4 and twice in the final round. The three judges scored all rounds for Postol (100-79).

In February 2014, a purse bid took place where Elite Boxing Promotions bid an amount of $120,000, which was more than Aydin's promoter Ahmet Oner offer, which was $50,000. Due to Postol's team winning the bid, the fight was likely set for Ukraine. It was instead announced to take place at The Forum in Inglewood, California on the undercard of Márquez vs. Alvarado on 17 May 2014. On his American debut, Postol stopped Aydin in round 11 to become the mandatory challenger for the WBC title. The time of stoppage was 2:52 of the round.

On 19 August 2014, the WBC ordered Postol vs. García and scheduled purse bids for 12 September. This was then pushed back to 10 October. On 11 October, Postol's manager Vadim Kornilov stated a deal was close to being reached for García to make a voluntary defence before fighting Postol. Kornilov said, "There is a step aside agreement that we have almost finalized. Postol and García will both get options to take other fights over the next 4 months and then Postol will again be in the mandatory position to fight the WBC champion." Both camps agreed the step-a-side deal the same day. Postol next planned to fight again in December 2014. Having not fought in December 2014, in January 2015, Postol announced that he would fight on the undercard of Danny García vs. Lamont Peterson on 11 April at the Barclays Center in New York. Kornilov announced his opponent to be Jake Giuriceo (17-2-1, 4 KOs) in a scheduled 10 round bout. This was later shortened to 8 rounds. Postol won the fight via unanimous decision after 8 rounds.

=== WBC super lightweight champion ===
==== Postol vs. Matthysse ====
It was announced that Postol would fight Lucas Matthysse (37-3, 34 KOs) in a scheduled 12 round bout for the WBC light welterweight title vacated by Danny García in order to move up to the welterweight division in August, at the StubHub Center in Carson, California on 3 October 2015. The camps made a deal just in time to avoid a WBC purse bid scheduled for Monday.

After waiting 17 months for a world title shot, Postol outboxed and outpunched Matthysse before knocking him out with a right hand to the eye in the 10th round to punctuate a superb performance and win a vacant 140-pound world title before 7,025 at the StubHub Center. Round after round, Postol attacked Matthysse to the body and kept his jab in his face. Matthysse landed a few hard right hands that rocked Postol during the middle rounds, but not enough to do any serious damage. In the 10th round, Postol nailed Matthysse on the left eye with a clean right hand and he went down. Matthysse got to one knee, but with his head down and dabbing at his eye, referee Reiss counted him out at 2 minutes, 58 seconds. At the time of the knockout, Postol led 86-85 on two scorecards and Matthysse surprisingly led 86-85 on the other. According to CompuBox punch statistics, Postol landed 113 of 509 punches (22 percent) and Matthysse connected on 96 of 281 (34 percent).

==== Postol vs. Crawford ====
On 3 May 2016 it was finally confirmed that Postol and Terence Crawford had officially signed a contract for a highly anticipated junior welterweight unification fight on 23 July at the MGM Grand in Las Vegas. Both fighters entered the ring with a matched record of 28 wins, no losses. Both men also entered the MGM Grand Garden Arena for the first time in their respective careers. Crawford won by unanimous decision and unified two light welterweight world titles before a crowd of 7,027. Crawford also claimed the vacant Lineal and Ring Magazine titles. Crawford scored two flash knockdowns in the fifth round, on going away on all three scorecards 118-107, 118-107 and 117-108. ESPN.com also scored the fight 118-107 for Crawford. Postol resorted to rabbit punching in the 11th round. He nailed Crawford with a right hand behind the head, for which Postol was penalized one point, adding to Crawford's advantage. Over 12 rounds, Crawford landed 141 of his 388 punches thrown (36%), and Postol landed 83 of 244 thrown (34%).

In the post-fight, Postol praised Crawford, saying "I thought it was a good fight between two technicians, but he was quicker than me. He is one of the best fighters in the world. I just didn't have the answers for him." Crawford also praised his trainer Brian McIntyre, "Freddie Roach and Postol said that Freddie would outcoach my coach, but you tell 'em who got outcoached tonight." McIntyre revealed the plan was to keep Postol moving, which would have eliminated his jab and right hand. Crawford's purse for the fight was $1.3 million. Postol earned $675,000 for his part. Some sources stated the fight generated 50,000 PPV buys on HBO. A replay was shown later in the week and drew 378,000, also considered a weak number.

=== Career from 2017 to 2019 ===
==== Postol vs. Najmiddinov ====
After nearly 14 months out, Postol would make his ring return in his native Ukraine at the AKKO International in Kyiv. Ringtv announced that Postol, who was still ranked by the WBC at #3, would fight inexperienced Uzbekistani boxer Jamshidbek Najmiddinov (14-0, 9 KOs) on 16 September 2017. Postol explained his time away from boxing, “After the Crawford fight, I took one month rest and then I got back to the gym. I have been ready to fight within all that time, with any opponent, but the question why I was absent should be directed to my manager.” His manager Vadim Kornilov answered, “We have been looking for the right opportunities for Postol in the United States and it’s been hard to get a TV spot for a non-U.S. fighter lately. We hope to make up for it in the next year.” Postol had appeared on HBO a total of three times in the past. Kornilov further explained that even when Postol was winning his fights, the possibility of finding TV opportunities were still slim.

Postol won a hard-fought fight, settling for a unanimous decision against Najmiddinov. Throughout the 10 rounds, Najmiddinov moved around the ring, throwing minimal punches. The opening rounds started with Postol controlling the fight and Najmiddinov swinging, but mostly missing Postol with counters. In round 5, Postol was floored with a left hook and hit the canvas hard. Postol beat the count, but on wobbly legs. Najmiddinov looked for the finish, but Postol survived the round. Najmiddinov couldn't capitalise on the knockdown as Postol regained his composure and dominated the remainder of the fight. The final judges scorecards read 98-92, 97-92, and 97-92 in favour of Postol.

The WBC super lightweight title became vacant after Terence Crawford decided to move up to welterweight. It was announced that number 1 ranked Amir Imam would fight number 3 ranked Jose Ramirez for the vacant title. WBC President Mauricio Sulaiman then announced that Postol, who was ranked number 4, would fight number 2 ranked Regis Prograis (20-0, 17 KOs) for the interim WBC title. The winner of both fights would then meet to become the full titleholder. In January 2018, a deal was finally reached for the fight between Postol and Prograis to take place on 9 March at the Buffalo Run Casino in Miami, Florida. Purse bids were due the next day. On 12 February, ESPN reported that Postol suffered a fractured thumb and then forced to drop out of the bout. His replacement was confirmed as former unified champion Julius Indongo (22-1, 11 KOs).

==== Postol vs. Taylor ====
On 26 April 2018, Cyclone Promotions announced Postol would be fighting their 27 year old rising prospect Josh Taylor at the SSE Hydro in Glasgow on 23 June, with Taylor defending his WBC Silver title and a chance for the winner to become a step closer to challenging for a world title. Postol was regarded as Taylor's toughest opponent to date in his 12-fight career. In a very competitive fight, Postol was dropped once and lost a unanimous decision to Taylor. The three judges scored the bout 117-110, 118-110 and 119-108 in favour of Taylor, however some believed the scores were too wide in what appeared a relatively close fight. Postol started the fight stronger but it was during the middle rounds where Taylor took control, eventually dropping Postol in round 10. Taylor was being urged by his team throughout the fight, but it was only the second half of the fight where he started being more aggressive and landing to the body. Taylor spent the last few rounds hitting Postol with his signature left hook. Taylor's promoter Barry McGuigan admitted the fight was 'terrific', but stated the scores should have been closer.

==== Postol vs. Ozgul ====
On 8 October 2018, the WBC revealed mandatories and eliminators they were looking to enforce in the near future, with one of them being a semi-final eliminator between Postol and Mohamed Mimoune. On 24 October, Postol was announced by the World Boxing Super Series as a reserve fighter for Josh Taylor vs. Ryan Martin on 3 November 2018 at the SSE Hydro in Glasgow. It was said that Postol would fight Turkish boxer Siar Ozgul (14-1, 3 KOs). As a reserve fighter, due to an unlikely scenario where one of the original participants cannot compete, Postol would step in. Postol was taken the 10 round distance, dominating the fight. Postol won via a points decision 99-91 on the referees scorecard.

==== Postol vs. Mimoune ====
On 19 March 2019, it was announced that Postol would fight French boxer Mohamed Mimoune (21-2, 2 KO) in a WBC final eliminator on 27 April. The bout was officially ordered by the WBC in October 2018. The fight was confirmed a week later to be part of a Showtime tripleheader featuring Robert Easter Jr. vs. Rances Barthelemy at The Joint at Hard Rock Hotel & Casino in Las Vegas. Postol defeated Mimoune by a 10 round unanimous decision to become a step closer to challenging WBC champion José Ramírez. Postol threw punches throughout and got the better of Mimoune in every round of the fight, mostly using his stiff jab and using his reach advantage. Postol managed to knock Mimoune off balance a number of times. By round 8, Mimoune's right eye began to swell. The three judges scored the fight 98-92, 97-93, and 99-91 for Postol. CompuBox showed that Postol landed 149 of 587 punches thrown (25%) and Mimoune landed 73 of his 306 punches (24%). Postol attributed the win with Freddie Roach's game plan and that he was able to stay disciplined. Showtime's unofficial judge Steve Farhood, gave Postol all 10 rounds or the fight.

==== Postol vs. Ramirez ====
On 29 August 2020, Postol, ranked #4 by The Ring and the WBO and #1 by the WBC, fought WBC and WBO super lightweight champion Jose Ramirez. In a very close fight, Ramirez managed to do enough in the eyes of two of the judges two score the majority decision victory. The scorecards read 116-112, 115-113 and 114-114 for Ramirez.

== Professional boxing record ==
37 fights	32 wins	5 losses
By knockout	12	2
By decision	20	3

No.	Result	Record	Opponent	Type	Round, time	Date	Location	Notes
37	Win	32–5	Andres Ramon Tejada	UD	8	25 Jan 2025	Palace of Sports, Kyiv, Ukraine	
36	Loss	31–5	Elvis Rodriguez	TKO	7 (10), 0:23	15 Jul 2023	Cosmopolitan of Las Vegas, Paradise, Nevada, US	
35	Loss	31–4	Gary Antuanne Russell	TKO	10 (10), 2:29	26 Feb 2022	Cosmopolitan of Las Vegas, Paradise, Nevada, US	For vacant WBA Continental Americas super lightweight title
34	Loss	31–3	José Ramírez	MD	12	29 Aug 2020	MGM Grand Conference Center, Paradise, Nevada, US	For WBC and WBO light-welterweight titles
33	Win	31–2	Mohamed Mimoune	UD	10	27 Apr 2019	Cosmopolitan of Las Vegas, Paradise, Nevada, US	
32	Win	30–2	Siar Ozgul	PTS	10	3 Nov 2018	SSE Hydro, Glasgow, Scotland	
31	Loss	29–2	Josh Taylor	UD	12	23 Jun 2018	SSE Hydro, Glasgow, Scotland	For WBC Silver light-welterweight title
30	Win	29–1	Jamshidbek Najmiddinov	UD	10	16 Sep 2017	AKKO International, Kyiv, Ukraine	
29	Loss	28–1	Terence Crawford	UD	12	23 Jul 2016	MGM Grand Garden Arena, Paradise, Nevada, US	Lost WBC light-welterweight title; For WBO and vacant The Ring light-welterweight titles
28	Win	28–0	Lucas Matthysse	KO	10 (12), 2:53	3 Oct 2015	StubHub Center, Carson, California US	Won vacant WBC light-welterweight title
27	Win	27–0	Jake Giuriceo	UD	8	11 Apr 2015	Barclays Center, New York City, New York, US	
26	Win	26–0	Selçuk Aydın	KO	11 (12), 2:52	17 May 2014	The Forum, Inglewood, California, US	
25	Win	25–0	Behzod Nabiev	UD	10	26 Dec 2013	Club Sport Life, Kyiv, Ukraine	
24	Win	24–0	Ignacio Mendoza	UD	12	3 Oct 2013	Club Sport Life, Kyiv, Ukraine	Retained WBC International light-welterweight title
23	Win	23–0	Bahrom Payozov	UD	8	29 May 2013	Club Sport Life, Kyiv, Ukraine	
22	Win	22–0	Hank Lundy	UD	12	21 Mar 2013	Club Sport Life, Kyiv, Ukraine	Won vacant WBC International light-welterweight title
21	Win	21–0	Henry Aurad	KO	1 (8), 2:39	22 Dec 2012	Hollywood Park Casino, Inglewood, California, US	
20	Win	20–0	DeMarcus Corley	UD	12	27 Oct 2012	Club Sport Life, Kyiv, Ukraine	Retained WBC International Silver light-welterweight title
19	Win	19–0	Yvan Mendy	UD	12	27 Jun 2012	Club Sport Life, Kyiv, Ukraine	Retained WBC International Silver light-welterweight title
18	Win	18–0	Jose Lopez	UD	10	27 Apr 2012	Club Sport Life, Kyiv, Ukraine	
17	Win	17–0	Artem Ayvazidi	RTD	5 (8), 3:00	26 Feb 2012	Club Sport Life, Kyiv, Ukraine	
16	Win	16–0	Karen Tevosyan	UD	12	18 Dec 2011	Yunost Sport Palace, Zaporizhzhia, Ukraine	Won vacant WBC International Silver light-welterweight title
15	Win	15–0	Felix Lora	UD	10	3 Oct 2011	Sports Complex "Freestyle", Kyiv, Ukraine	
14	Win	14–0	Tarik Madni	UD	10	11 Jun 2011	Palace of Sports, Kyiv, Ukraine	
13	Win	13–0	Sam Rukundo	MD	10	13 Mar 2011	Sports Palace, Tbilisi, Georgia	
12	Win	12–0	Jahongir Abdullaev	TKO	4 (10)	19 Nov 2010	Sports Complex "Freestyle", Kyiv, Ukraine	
11	Win	11–0	Jay Morris	UD	10	28 Aug 2010	Maidan Nezalezhnosti, Kyiv, Ukraine	
10	Win	10–0	Mamasoli Kimsanbaev	UD	8	21 May 2010	Sports Complex "Freestyle", Kyiv, Ukraine	
9	Win	9–0	Hujabek Mamatov	RTD	2 (6), 3:00	13 Mar 2010	Podmoskovye Hall, Podolsk, Russia	
8	Win	8–0	Laszlo Komjathi	KO	7 (8), 1:56	6 Feb 2010	Sports Complex "Freestyle", Kyiv, Ukraine	
7	Win	7–0	Vitaly Olkhovik	KO	6 (8), 0:20	28 Nov 2009	Elite Boxing Gym, Kyiv, Ukraine	
6	Win	6–0	Araik Sachbazjan	UD	6	18 Sep 2009	Gran Casino, Castellón de la Plana, Spain	
5	Win	5–0	Dmytro Bohachuk	RTD	4 (6), 3:00	15 Aug 2009	Borschagovka Gym, Kyiv, Ukraine	
4	Win	4–0	Ruslan Pavlenko	TKO	1 (6)	13 Jun 2009	Kyiv, Ukraine	
3	Win	3–0	Denys Tupilenko	TKO	3 (4)	25 Apr 2009	Borschagovka Gym, Kyiv, Ukraine	
2	Win	2–0	Sreten Miletic	UD	4	29 Mar 2008	Športska Dvorana Pecara, Široki Brijeg, Bosnia and Herzegovina	
1	Win	1–0	Zsolt Vicze	TKO	2 (4)	1 Oct 2007	Brčko, Bosnia and Herzegovina	

== Pay-per-view bouts ==
Date	Fight	Billing	Buys	Revenue	Network
July 23, 2016	Crawford vs. Postol	Red vs Blue	50,000	$3.6m	HBO

Sporting positions
Regional boxing titles
New title	WBC International Silver super lightweight champion 18 December 2011 – December 2012; Vacated	Vacant Title next held by Humberto Soto
Vacant Title last held by Prawet Singwancha	WBC International super lightweight champion 21 March 2013 – December 2013; Vacated	Vacant Title next held by Chris Jenkins
World boxing titles
Vacant Title last held by Danny García	WBC super lightweight champion 3 October 2015 – 23 July 2016	Succeeded by Terence Crawford
