= Jose Ramirez (boxer) =

American boxer (born 1992)

José Ramírez
Personal information
- Nickname: Jaguar
- Born: August 12, 1992 (age 34) Avenal, California, U.S.
- Height: 5 ft 10 in (178 cm)
- Weight: Light welterweight

Boxing career
- Reach: 72 1/2 in (184 cm)
- Stance: Orthodox

Boxing record
- Total fights: 33
- Wins: 29
- Win by KO: 18
- Losses: 4

José Carlos Ramírez (born August 12, 1992) is an American professional boxer. He is a former unified champion at light welterweight, having held the World Boxing Council (WBC) title from 2018 to 2021 and the World Boxing Organization (WBO) title from 2019 to 2021. As an amateur he represented the United States at the 2012 Olympics.

== Amateur career ==
Ramírez won the United States national amateur boxing championships Lightweight tournament at the U.S. Olympic Training Center in Colorado Springs, Colorado. He's also a Jr. Golden Gloves National Champion, two-time Jr. Olympic National Champion, and a two-time Ringside World Champion. His family currently lives in Avenal, California where he's lived all his life. Jose qualified to represent the United States at the 2012 Olympics by defeating 2008 Olympian Raynell Williams 21-16 in the finals of the 2012 United States Olympic Boxing Trials. Ramírez beat Rachid Azzedine and then lost to Fazliddin Gaibnazarov at the 2012 Summer Olympics in London.

== Professional career ==
=== Early career ===
Ramírez turned professional in 2012 and has been promoted by Bob Arum as a Top Rank fighter since the same year.

After compiling a perfect 15-0 record, Ramírez beat Johnny Garcia by unanimous decision on December 5, 2015 to win the vacant WBC Continental Americas light welterweight title. He would go on to defend the title a total of four times.

=== WBC light welterweight champion ===
==== Ramírez vs. Imam ====
On March 17, 2018, Ramírez defeated Amir Imam by unanimous decision with scores of 120-108, 117-111 and 115-113 to win the vacant WBC super lightweight title. Ramírez had badly swelled Imam's right eye and landed all kinds of hard punches throughout the fight.

==== Ramírez vs. Orozco ====
In his next fight, Ramírez faced Antonio Orozco, then #3 by the WBC at light welterweight, at the Save Mart Center in Fresno, California. In an action-packed fight, the defending champion managed to drop his opponent twice, once in the fourth, and once in the eighth round. Despite the two knockdowns, Orozco gave his all and even was the aggressor at times. In the end, it was a clear win for Ramírez, all three judges scoring the fight 119-107 in favor of the champion.

==== Ramírez vs. Zepeda ====
In his next title defense, Ramírez faced Jose Zepeda, ranked #14 by the WBC at light welterweight. Zepeda was winning the early rounds of the fight. Ramírez started to gain control of the fight in the fourth round. Ramírez finished the fight strong, especially in the last 20 seconds, unleashing power shots on Zepeda. Ramírez won the fight via majority decision in a very competitive fight.

=== Unified light welterweight champion ===
==== Ramírez vs. Hooker ====
On July 27, 2019, Ramírez fought undefeated WBO light welterweight champion Maurice Hooker in a unification fight. In an action-packed fight, Ramírez first managed to drop Hooker in the opening round, and despite replays showing that Ramírez had stepped on Hooker's foot, it was ruled an official knockdown. As the rounds went on, the fight slowed down, which seemed to favor Hooker. However, in the sixth round, Ramírez connected on a left hand to the chin, followed by another big left to the head, which sent Hooker reeling against the ropes. As Hooker was helpless, the referee stopped the fight with 1:48 to go in the round, awarding Ramírez the technical knockout victory.

==== Ramírez vs. Postol ====
On August 29, 2020, Ramírez defended his WBC and WBO titles against former WBC champion Viktor Postol, winning a majority decision with scores of 116-112, 115-113, 114-114.

==== Ramírez vs. Taylor ====
On May 22, 2021, Ramírez attempted to become the first undisputed champion of Mexican descent when he faced undefeated unified champion Josh Taylor in Paradise, Nevada in a showdown for the undisputed light welterweight championship. Ramírez was knocked down twice in the sixth and seventh rounds, both times by Taylor's left hand, and ultimately lost by unanimous decision with all three judges scoring the bout 114-112 in favor of Taylor.

=== Continued light welterweight career ===
==== Ramírez vs. Pedraza ====
On October 30, 2021, it was revealed that Ramírez would face the former two-weight world champion José Pedraza on February 5, 2022, in the main event of an ESPN broadcast Top Rank card. The bout was later postponed for March 4, as Pedraza fell ill with flu-like symptoms. Ramirez won the bout by unanimous decision in a competitive fight, By all judges scoring it 116-112.

==== Ramírez vs. Barthelemy ====
Ramírez was scheduled to face Rances Barthelemy on April 27, 2024 at Save Mart Center in Fresno, CA. The outing was his first fight promoted by Golden Boy. Ramírez won the fight by unanimous decision.

==== Ramírez vs. Barboza Jr ====
On November 16, 2024, Ramirez faced Arnold Barboza Jr. in a ten-round bout at The Venue Riyadh in Saudi Arabia. Barboza Jr. emerged victorious via unanimous decision, with judges scoring the fight 97-93 and 96-94 twice in his favor.

==== Ramírez vs. Haney ====
Ramírez fought Devin Haney in Times Square, New York, on 2 May 2025, and lost by unanimous decision.

==== Ramírez vs. Rocha ====
Ramírez suffered his third defeat in succession when he lost to Alexis Rocha via unanimous decision at T-Mobile Arena in Paradise, Nevada, on 12 September 2026.

== Professional boxing record ==
33 fights	29 wins	4 losses
By knockout	18	0
By decision	11	4

No.	Result	Record	Opponent	Type	Round, time	Date	Location	Notes
33	Loss	29–4	Alexis Rocha	UD	10	Sep 12, 2026	T-Mobile Arena, Paradise, Nevada, U.S.	
32	Loss	29–3	Devin Haney	UD	12	May 2, 2025	Times Square, New York City, New York, U.S.	
31	Loss	29–2	Arnold Barboza Jr.	UD	10	Nov 16, 2024	The Venue Riyadh, Riyadh, Saudi Arabia	
30	Win	29–1	Rances Barthelemy	UD	12	Apr 27, 2024	Save Mart Center, Fresno, California, U.S.	
29	Win	28–1	Richard Commey	KO	11 (12), 2:44	Mar 26, 2023	Save Mart Center, Fresno, California, U.S.	
28	Win	27–1	José Pedraza	UD	12	Mar 4, 2022	Save Mart Center, Fresno, California, U.S.	
27	Loss	26–1	Josh Taylor	UD	12	May 22, 2021	Virgin Hotels Las Vegas, Paradise, Nevada, U.S.	Lost WBC and WBO light welterweight titles; For WBA (Super), IBF, and The Ring light welterweight titles
26	Win	26–0	Viktor Postol	MD	12	Aug 29, 2020	MGM Grand Conference Center, Paradise, Nevada, U.S.	Retained WBC and WBO light welterweight titles
25	Win	25–0	Maurice Hooker	TKO	6 (12), 1:48	Jul 27, 2019	College Park Center, Arlington, Texas, U.S.	Retained WBC light welterweight title; Won WBO light welterweight title
24	Win	24–0	Jose Zepeda	MD	12	Feb 10, 2019	Save Mart Center, Fresno, California, U.S.	Retained WBC light welterweight title
23	Win	23–0	Antonio Orozco	UD	12	Sep 14, 2018	Save Mart Center, Fresno, California, U.S.	Retained WBC light welterweight title
22	Win	22–0	Amir Imam	UD	12	Mar 17, 2018	The Theater at Madison Square Garden, New York City, New York, U.S.	Won vacant WBC light welterweight title
21	Win	21–0	Mike Reed	KO	2 (10), 1:43	Nov 11, 2017	Save Mart Center, Fresno, California, U.S.	Retained WBC Continental Americas light welterweight title
20	Win	20–0	Jake Giuriceo	TKO	2 (10), 2:10	May 5, 2017	Reno-Sparks Convention Center, Reno, Nevada, U.S.	
19	Win	19–0	Issouf Kinda	KO	6 (10), 0:58	Dec 2, 2016	Save Mart Arena, Fresno, California, U.S.	Retained WBC Continental Americas light welterweight title
18	Win	18–0	Tomas Mendez	KO	4 (10), 0:53	Jul 9, 2016	Tachi Palace Hotel & Casino, Lemoore, California, U.S.	Retained WBC Continental Americas light welterweight title
17	Win	17–0	Manuel Pérez	UD	10	Apr 9, 2016	MGM Grand Garden Arena, Paradise, Nevada, U.S.	Retained WBC Continental Americas light welterweight title
16	Win	16–0	Johnny Garcia	UD	8	Dec 5, 2015	Save Mart Arena, Fresno, California, U.S.	Won vacant WBC Continental Americas light welterweight title
15	Win	15–0	Ryusei Yoshida	RTD	3 (8), 3:00	Jul 18, 2015	Cotai Arena, Macau, China	
14	Win	14–0	Robert Frankel	KO	5 (8), 2:18	May 9, 2015	Selland Arena, Fresno, California, U.S.	
13	Win	13–0	Antonio Arellano	TKO	6 (6), 2:50	Dec 13, 2014	Cosmopolitan of Las Vegas, Paradise, Nevada, U.S.	
12	Win	12–0	David Rodela	KO	1 (8), 0:50	Oct 25, 2014	Selland Arena, Fresno, California, U.S.	
11	Win	11–0	Alfred Romero	UD	8	Aug 2, 2014	Cosmopolitan of Las Vegas, Paradise, Nevada, U.S.	
10	Win	10–0	Jesus Selig	KO	2 (6), 0:44	May 17, 2014	Selland Arena, Fresno, California, U.S.	
9	Win	9–0	Boyd Henley	TKO	2 (6), 2:32	Mar 29, 2014	Texas Station Casino, Las Vegas, Nevada, U.S.	
8	Win	8–0	Javier Perez	TKO	1 (6), 2:32	Feb 1, 2014	Laredo Energy Arena, Laredo, Texas, U.S.	
7	Win	7–0	Erick Hernandez Perez	KO	1 (6), 0:47	Nov 9, 2013	West Hills College, Lemoore, California, U.S.	
6	Win	6–0	Daniel Calzada	UD	4	Sep 28, 2013	StubHub Center, Carson, California, U.S.	
5	Win	5–0	Mike Maldonado	TKO	1 (6), 1:06	Aug 17, 2013	Laredo Energy Arena, Laredo, Texas, U.S.	
4	Win	4–0	Christopher Williams	TKO	1 (4), 1:30	Jun 29, 2013	WinStar Casino, Thackerville, Oklahoma, U.S.	
3	Win	3–0	Antonio Martinez	UD	4	Apr 27, 2013	Frank Erwin Center, Austin, Texas, U.S.	
2	Win	2–0	Charlie Dubray	TKO	1 (4), 1:06	Mar 30, 2013	Mandalay Bay Events Center, Paradise, Nevada, U.S.	
1	Win	1–0	Corey Seigwarth	TKO	1 (4), 2:05	Dec 8, 2012	MGM Grand Garden Arena, Paradise, Nevada, U.S.	

== Personal life ==
Ramírez is of Mexican descent, his parents are from the state of Michoacán.

== See also ==
- List of world light-welterweight boxing champions
- List of Mexican boxing world champions

Sporting positions
Amateur boxing titles
Previous: Duran Caffero Jr.	U.S. lightweight champion 2010, 2011, 2012	Next: Kenneth Sims Jr.
World boxing titles
Vacant Title last held by Terence Crawford	WBC light welterweight champion March 17, 2018 - May 22, 2021	Succeeded by Josh Taylor
Preceded by Maurice Hooker	WBO Junior welterweight champion July 27, 2019 - May 22, 2021	Succeeded by Josh Taylor
