= Adil Anwar =

English boxer (born 1987)

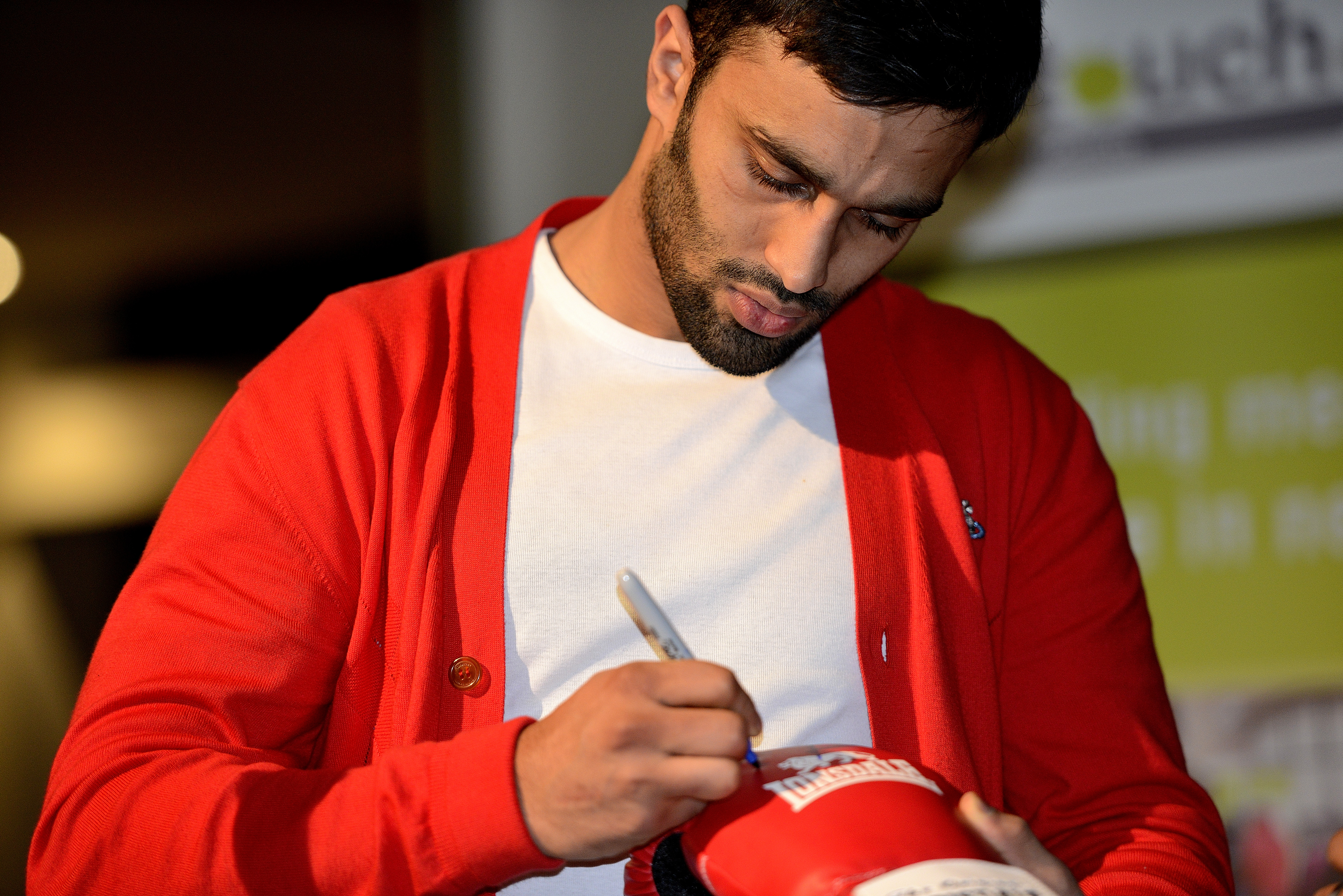
- Adil Anwar in 2013

Personal information
- Nickname: "Platinum Kid"
- Nationality: British
- Born: 6 July 1987 (age 39) Leeds, Yorkshire, England
- Height: 177 cm (5 ft 10 in)
- Weight: Light welterweight; Welterweight; Light middleweight
- Website: adilanwar.com

Boxing career
- Stance: Orthodox

Boxing record
- Total fights: 29
- Wins: 22
- Win by KO: 8
- Losses: 7
- Draws: 0

Adil Anwar (Urdu: عادل انور; born 6 July 1987) is a former British professional boxer who competed from 2007 to 2017. He won the English welterweight title in 2011 and challenged for the British super lightweight title in 2013.

== Early life and amateur career ==
Anwar was born to a British Pakistani family on 6 July 1987 and was raised in Burley, Leeds, West Yorkshire, England. His grandfather was a gymnast and boxed in the Army, and several of his uncles were also involved in combat sports.

Anwar started boxing after his father took him to the gym at the age of 13 to learn to defend himself. He was initially reluctant but eased into the sport as he grew older, having his first fight when he was 14 He got into the 'National Boys Clubs' (NACYP) final where he lost to Gary Barker, he then won The Junior ABA Championships and National Boys Clubs at a later date as well as winning whilst boxing for England at International events.

Whilst still an Amateur he was involved in a car accident which left him with a broken collar bone after which he was told it would be unlikely he'd box again, although 18 months after the incident he was back training. Following the incident the England set-up grew distant from Anwar, so he decided to turn professional rather than stay in Amateur Boxing.

In total, he had 65 Amateur fight of which 9 were losses.

== Professional career ==
=== Welterweight ===
==== Early career ====
Anwar made his professional debut in 2007 but rose to prominence in 2012 after winning the Prizefighter tournament following a victory over undefeated 22-year-old prospect Tyrone Nurse.

Anwar fought at the Welterweight division in 2011. He went on to win the International Masters welterweight title before winning the English welterweight title, a fight he took on at a weeks notice against an undefeated James Flinn.

=== Light-Welterweight ===
Following his success with Prizefighter in 2012, Anwar began to call out then British light-welterweight champion Ashley Theophane for a title fight he had been pursuing since the previous year. Shortly after, Theophane lost the title to challenger Darren Hamilton.

Whilst Anwar waited to compete for the British title he won two official British championship eliminators before going on to win the vacant British Masters Gold light-welterweight title. He will finally fight for the British light-welterweight title against Darren Hamilton in July 2013. Anwar lost via unanimous decision to Hamilton at the Echo Arena, judges scored the bout (118–112, 117-112 & 116–113) all in favour of Hamilton.

=== Light middleweight ===
Anwar fell further down the ranks and was looking at getting back into the mix of British super welterweights. Anwar's next scheduled fight was in September 2013 against 35 year old Simone Lucas (4–18–3, 1 KO). Anwar lost a 4-round decision after the referee scored the bout (39–37).

Going back down to welterweight, Anwar went back to winning ways on 28 March 2014 against Lazslo Fazekas (18–12–1, 13 KOs), referee scored it 40–37 in favour of Anwar.

Anwar next fought for the vacant International Masters Silver welterweight title on 9 May 2014 in Sheffield against Chad Gaynor (14–1, 7 KOs). Anwar lost via 2nd-round TKO following a combination of head shots.

=== Return to Welterweight ===
After nearly a year out without having fought, Anwar made another attempt for a comeback in March 2015 against Ryan Hardy (7–4, 0 KOs). After eight rounds it went to the referees' scorecard who had it at (79–72) in favour of Anwar. This took Anwar's record to 21 wins with four losses. Anwar fought again two months later in a losing attempt against Dale Evans (9–2–2, 3 KOs). After eight rounds the referee scored the fight 77–73. Anwar was down in the 6th and twice in the 8th round.

Anwar took nearly another year out before returning to the ring on 18 March 2016 at Elland Road against Sylwester Walczak (4-20, 0 KOs). The bout stopped after round one, Walczak quit on his stool claiming he had injured his left shoulder.

Anwar fought on 7 May 2016 at the Manchester Arena on the undercard of Anthony Crolla vs. Ismael Barroso in a 10-round bout for the vacant WBC International Silver welterweight title against Shayne Singleton (22–1, 7 KOs). Anwar was knocked down in round one, although he managed to win the next few rounds more aggressively, he was down again in the 8th round and the referee stopped the fight.

Anwar revealed that he would travel to Spain to challenge Jose Del Rio on 18 March 2017. He lost the fairly close bout via a 10-round unanimous decision with the judges scorecards reading 98–92, 98–95, 96-94 all in favour of Del Rio.

== Professional Boxing Record ==
29 Fights, 22 Wins (8 Knockouts), 7 Losses, 0 Draw
No.	Res.	Record	Opponent	Type	Round, time	Date	Location	Notes
29	Loss	22–7	(Spain) Jose Del Rio	UD	10	18 Mar 2017	Pabellón Municipal de Galatzó, Santa Ponsa, Islas Baleares, Spain	
28	Loss	22–6	(United Kingdom) Shayne Singleton	TKO	8 (10) 1:31	7 May 2016	(United Kingdom) Manchester Arena, Manchester, England	For vacant WBC International Silver welterweight title
27	Win	22–5	(Poland) Sylwester Walczak	RTD	1 (4) 3:00	18 Mar 2016	(United Kingdom) Elland Road, Leeds, England	
26	Loss	21–5	(United Kingdom) Dale Evans	PTS	8	15 May 2015	(United Kingdom) Ice Sheffield, Sheffield, England	
25	Win	21–4	(United Kingdom) Ryan Hardy	PTS	8	27 Mar 2015	(United Kingdom) Leeds Elland Road, Leeds, England	
24	Loss	20–4	(United Kingdom) Chad Gaynor	TKO	2 (10) 1:58	9 May 2014	(United Kingdom) Ice Sheffield, Sheffield, England	
23	Win	20–3	(Hungary) Laszlo Fazekas	PTS	4	28 Mar 2014	(United Kingdom) Elland Road, Leeds, England	
22	Loss	19–3	(United Kingdom) Simone Lucas	PTS	4	27 Sep 2013	(United Kingdom) Elland Road, Leeds, England	
21	Loss	19–2	(United Kingdom) Darren Hamilton	UD	12	6 Jul 2013	(United Kingdom) Echo Arena, Liverpool, England	For British super lightweight title
20	Win	19–1	(United Kingdom) Lance Sheehan	TD	6 (12)	23 Feb 2013	(United Kingdom) Echo Arena, Liverpool, England	
19	Win	18–1	(United Kingdom) Dale Miles	UD	12	13 Oct 2012	(United Kingdom) Echo Arena, Liverpool, England	British super lightweight title final eliminator
18	Win	17–1	(United Kingdom) Dave Ryan	UD	10	19 May 2012	(United Kingdom) Aintree Equestrian Centre, Liverpool, England	British super lightweight title eliminator
17	Win	16–1	(United Kingdom) Tyrone Nurse	UD	3	11 Feb 2012	(United Kingdom) Civic Hall, Wolverhampton, England	Prizefighter: The Light Welterweights - final
16	Win	15–1	(United Kingdom) John Watson	UD	3	11 Feb 2011	(United Kingdom) Civic Hall, Wolverhampton, England	Prizefighter: The Light Welterweights II - semifinal
15	Win	14–1	(United Kingdom) Barry Morrison	UD	3	11 Feb 2012	(United Kingdom) Civic Hall, Wolverhampton, England	Prizefighter: The Light Welterweights II - quarterfinal
14	Win	13–1	(United Kingdom) James Flinn	TKO	8 (10), 0:43	12 Nov 2011	(United Kingdom) Event City, Trafford Park, Manchester, England	Won vacant English welterweight title
13	Win	12–1	(Slovakia) Julius Rafael	KO	4 (6), 1:36	24 Sep 2011	(United Kingdom) Elland Road, Leeds, England	
12	Win	11–1	(United Kingdom) } Nathan Graham	TKO	10 (10), 2:20	18 Mar 2011	(United Kingdom) York Hall, London, England	
11	Win	10–1	(United Kingdom) Michael Frontin	TKO	6 (10)	26 Feb 2011	(United Kingdom) Elland Road, Leeds, England	
10	Win	9–1	(Poland) Arek Malek	PTS	6	2 Oct 2010	(United Kingdom) Elland Road, Leeds, England	
9	Win	8–1	(United Kingdom) Billy Smith	PTS	6	27 Mar 2010	(United Kingdom) Elland Road, Leeds, England	
8	Win	7–1	(United Kingdom) Darren Askew	PTS	6	26 Nov 2009	(United Kingdom) Elland Road, Leeds, England	
7	Win	6–1	(United Kingdom) Ben Lawler	TKO	2 (?) 0:36	26 Sep 2009	(United Kingdom) Elland Road, Leeds, England	
6	Win	5–1	(United Kingdom) Johnny Greaves	TKO	4 (6), 1:47	14 May 2009	(United Kingdom) Elland Road, Leeds, England	
5	Win	4–1	(United Kingdom) Ernie Smith	PTS	6	27 Nov 2008	(United Kingdom) Elland Road, Leeds, England	
4	Win	3–1	(United Kingdom) Scott Sandmann	TKO	1 (6) 1:26	5 Jun 2008	(United Kingdom) Elland Road, Leeds, England	
3	Win	2–1	(United Kingdom) Steve Cooper	PTS	6	21 Feb 2008	(United Kingdom) Elland Road, Leeds, England	
2	Loss	1–1	(United Kingdom) Graeme Higginson	PTS	6	15 Nov 2007	(United Kingdom) Elland Road, Leeds, England	
1	Win	1–0	(United Kingdom) Craig Tomes	PTS	6	14 Jun 2007	(United Kingdom) Elland Road, Leeds, England	

== Personal life ==
Anwar belongs to the British Pakistani community. He is a fan of the boxer Naseem Hamed, citing him as an inspiration. Apart from boxing, Anwar is also a rugby fan and a support the Leeds Rhinos rugby league club.

He is currently living in Leeds, West Yorkshire, England. He lives with his wife, Kiran Zubair, two daughters and twin boys.

== Championships held ==
- English welterweight champion.
- International Masters welterweight champion.
- British Masters Gold light-welterweight champion.
