= Jack Catterall =

English boxer (born 1993)

Personal information
- Nickname: El Gato ("The Cat")
- Born: 1 July 1993 (age 33) Chorley, Lancashire, England
- Height: 5 ft 7 in (170 cm)
- Weight: Light welterweight; Welterweight

Boxing career
- Reach: 67 in (170 cm)
- Stance: Southpaw

Boxing record
- Total fights: 35
- Wins: 33
- Win by KO: 14
- Losses: 2

Jack Catterall (born 1 July 1993) is an English professional boxer. He has held the World Boxing Association (WBA) welterweight title (Regular version) since May 2026. At regional level, he has held multiple light-welterweight championships, including the British title from 2017 to 2018.

== Early life ==
Jack Catterall was born on 1 July 1993 in Chorley, Lancashire. One of nine children in the household, Catterall took part in judo and wrestling before finding his way into boxing at the age of 10. Before getting into boxing full time, he took a college course in public services and worked a job laying tarmac to fund his gym sessions.

== Amateur career ==
Catterall boxed out of Chorley ABC from the age of 10 and compiled an amateur record of 48–18, during a career in which he won a CYP (Clubs for Young People) National title and placed second in the ABAE Junior Championships.

== Professional career ==
=== Early career ===
Catterall made his professional debut against Carl Allen on 22 September 2012 at the Bowlers Exhibition Centre in Manchester, winning by points decision (PTS) over four rounds. He fought once more in 2012, defeating Johnny Greaves via first-round technical knockout (TKO).

He started 2013 with a fourth-round TKO win over Carl Allen in March, and secured another three wins that year; Mark McKray via PTS in April; a second-round knockout (KO) over Tom Price in June; and Renald Garrido via PTS in November.

Following his first fight of 2014 – a fifth-round TKO victory over Aleksas Vaseris in March – it was announced that Catterall had signed a two-year contract with Frank Warren's Queensberry Promotions. His first fight with the company was an eight-round points decision victory over Krzysztof Szot in May. Up next was a fight with undefeated prospect Nathan Brough (11–0) on 26 July at the Phones 4u Arena in Manchester. Both fighters had success in round one – Brough with the jab and Catterall with a few clean shots to the head. The second-round saw much of the same, until Catterall landed a vicious counter left hook to the chin of Brough which left the Liverpudlian needing medical attention in the ring, scoring a TKO win with 58 seconds left in the round to capture the Central Area light-welterweight title. His final fight of 2014 came on 25 October at the Echo Arena, Liverpool, against Tom Stalker, friend of Catterall's previous opponent, Nathan Brough. Stalker, a 2012 Olympian and also unbeaten with a record of 9–0, had pulled out of a British light-welterweight title eliminator against Chris Jenkins in favour of facing Catterall. Catterall dropped Stalker in the first and second rounds. With 12 seconds remaining in the eighth-round, referee Mark Lyons waved off the fight after a left hook from Catterall sent Stalker stumbling on unsteady legs, giving Catterall the TKO win and the WBO European light-welterweight title.

On 6 March 2015, Catterall fought Cesar David Inalef (18–5–1) for the vacant WBO Inter-Continental light-welterweight title at the Echo Arena in Liverpool. After a controlled performance, in which Catterall had Inalef down in the second-round from a body shot and knocked the Argentine's mouthpiece out on three occasions, Catterall scored a fifth-round TKO with 1 minute and 3 seconds remaining. He successfully defended his WBO regional title three times in 2015; a sixth-round TKO over Gabriel Calfin in September; a ten-round UD over Jarkko Putkonen in October; and a third-round TKO over Noe Nunez in December to finish the year.

=== British champion ===
He had three decision wins in 2016; a defence against Joe Hughes in a British light-welterweight final eliminator in May; Lukasz Janik in an eight-round non-title bout in August; and another defence against Diego Gonzalo Luque in December.

He began 2017 with a third-round TKO win over Martin Gethin in April, in what would be Gethin's final professional bout, before going on to challenge British light-welterweight champion Tyrone Nurse (35–2–2) on 21 October, at the First Direct Arena in Leeds. Catterall won by UD with the scorecards reading 118–111, 116–113 and 115–114, to capture the British light-welterweight title. Shortly after winning the title, Catterall vacated in favour of continuing down the WBO title route.

=== Rise up the ranks ===
Starting out 2018 with a first-round KO over Kevin McCauley in a non-title bout in March 2018, Catterall went on to successfully defend his WBO Inter-Continental title a further three times that year; scoring a first-round TKO over Christopher Sebire in May; a ten-round unanimous decision over undefeated Tyrone McKenna in June; and ending with a twelve-round UD over Ohara Davies in October.

In January 2019, it was announced that Catterall had been installed as the mandatory challenger to WBO light-welterweight champion Maurice Hooker. While waiting for a fight with Hooker, Catterall took a stay-busy fight in April, defeating Oscar Amador via third-round KO. In August, the WBO announced they had sanctioned a unification fight between Hooker and WBC champion José Ramírez, with the winner set to face Catterall as the mandatory challenger within 120 days of the bout. In the meantime, Catterall took another stay-busy fight, defeating Timo Schwarzkopf via UD in November.

After Ramírez defeated Hooker in July 2020 to become a unified champion, the WBO ordered Ramírez to face Catterall. Around the same time, the WBC also ordered Ramírez to face their mandatory challenger, Viktor Postol. Ramírez faced Postol in August 2020, with the agreement that Catterall face the winner. Less than 48 hours after Ramírez emerged victorious, the WBO once again ordered Ramírez to face Catterall. Catterall opted to take a step-aside deal in order to allow Ramírez to face WBA (Super), IBF, and The Ring champion, Josh Taylor, again with the agreement that the winner face Catterall next. Taylor defeated Ramírez in May 2021, unifying all four major world titles to set up an undisputed championship fight with Catterall.

=== Undisputed championship challenge ===
In August, ESPN reported that Catterall and Taylor had agreed terms to meet on 18 December at the SSE Hydro in Glasgow. It was announced by Taylor on 21 October that he had suffered an injury, and thus the fight would be postponed to 26 February 2022. Taylor won the bout by a highly controversial split decision with the judges’ scorecards reading 114–111, 113–112 for Taylor and 113–112 for Catterall.

==== Catterall vs. Taylor II ====
On 26 May 2024 in Leeds, Catterall faced Josh Taylor in a rematch. He won the fight by unanimous decision with the scores 117–111, 117–111 and 116–113.

==== Catterall vs. Prograis ====
Catterall was scheduled to face Regis Prograis in a 12-round light welterweight bout at Co-op Live Arena in Manchester, on 24 August. The contest was postponed after Catterall suffered an injury and was rescheduled for 26 October at the same venue, resulting in him winning by unanimous points decision.

==== Catterall vs. Barboza Jr. ====
Catterall faced Arnold Barboza Jr. in a WBO super lightweight title eliminator at Co-op Live, on 15 February 2025. He lost by split decision.

=== Welterweight ===
==== Catterall vs. Eubank ====
Moving up a weight division, Catterall faced IBF Intercontinental welterweight champion Harlem Eubank at the Manchester Arena on 5 July 2025. The fight was stopped at the start of the seventh round on the advice of the ringside doctor due to both fighters suffering serious cuts in an accidental clash of heads. Catterall was declared the winner by technical unanimous decision as he was ahead on all three judges' scorecards at the time of the stoppage.

==== Catterall vs. Essuman ====
Catterall defeated WBO Global welterweight champion Ekow Essuman by 11th round technical knockout at Tottenham Hotspur Stadium in London on 15 November 2025.

=== WBA (Regular) welterweight champion ===
==== Catterall vs. Giyasov ====
Catterall faced the previously unbeaten Shakhram Giyasov for the vacant WBA (Regular) welterweight title at the Pyramids of Giza in Egypt on 23 May 2026. He knocked his opponent to the canvas in the first round and went on to win via unanimous decision.

== Professional boxing record ==
35 fights	33 wins	2 losses
By knockout	14	0
By decision	19	2

No.	Result	Record	Opponent	Type	Round, time	Date	Location	Notes
35	Win	33–2	Shakhram Giyasov	UD	12	23 May 2026	Pyramids of Giza, Giza, Egypt	Won vacant WBA (Regular) welterweight title
34	Win	32–2	Ekow Essuman	TKO	11 (12), 0:50	15 Nov 2025	Tottenham Hotspur Stadium, London, England	Won WBO Global welterweight title
33	Win	31–2	Harlem Eubank	TD	7 (12), 0:01	5 Jul 2025	Manchester Arena, Manchester, England	Won IBF Inter-Continental and vacant WBA International welterweight titles; Unanimous TD: Catterall cut from accidental head clash
32	Loss	30–2	Arnold Barboza Jr.	SD	12	15 Feb 2025	Co-op Live, Manchester, England	For vacant WBO Interim light welterweight title
31	Win	30–1	Regis Prograis	UD	12	26 Oct 2024	Co-op Live, Manchester, England	Won vacant WBO International light welterweight title
30	Win	29–1	Josh Taylor	UD	12	25 May 2024	First Direct Arena, Leeds, England	
29	Win	28–1	Jorge Linares	UD	12	21 Oct 2023	Liverpool Arena, Liverpool, England	
28	Win	27–1	Darragh Foley	UD	10	27 May 2023	Manchester Arena, Manchester, England	Won vacant WBA Inter-Continental light-welterweight title
27	Loss	26–1	Josh Taylor	SD	12	26 Feb 2022	OVO Hydro, Glasgow, Scotland	For WBA (Super), WBC, IBF, WBO and The Ring light-welterweight titles
26	Win	26–0	Abderrazak Houya	PTS	10	28 Nov 2020	Church House, London, England	
25	Win	25–0	Timo Schwarzkopf	UD	10	22 Nov 2019	Caesars Palace Dubai, Dubai, United Arab Emirates	
24	Win	24–0	Oscar Amador	KO	3 (8), 1:12	27 Apr 2019	The SSE Arena, London, England	
23	Win	23–0	Ohara Davies	UD	12	6 Oct 2018	Leicester Arena, Leicester, England	Retained WBO Inter-Continental light-welterweight title
22	Win	22–0	Tyrone McKenna	UD	12	30 Jun 2018	The SSE Arena, Belfast, Northern Ireland	Retained WBO Inter-Continental light-welterweight title
21	Win	21–0	Christopher Sebire	TKO	1 (10), 1:47	19 May 2018	Elland Road, Leeds, England	Retained WBO Inter-Continental light-welterweight title
20	Win	20–0	Kevin McCauley	KO	1 (6), 2:12	31 Mar 2018	Guild Hall, Preston, England	
19	Win	19–0	Tyrone Nurse	UD	12	21 Oct 2017	First Direct Arena, Leeds, England	Won British light-welterweight title
18	Win	18–0	Martin Gethin	TKO	3 (10), 1:40	8 Apr 2017	Manchester Arena, Manchester, England	Retained WBO Inter-Continental light-welterweight title
17	Win	17–0	Diego Gonzalo Luque	UD	10	3 Dec 2016	Lagoon Leisure Centre, Paisley, Scotland	Retained WBO Inter-Continental light-welterweight title
16	Win	16–0	Łukasz Janik	PTS	8	12 Aug 2016	Village Hotel, Ashton-under-Lyne, England	
15	Win	15–0	Joe Hughes	UD	12	13 May 2016	Macron Stadium's Premier Suite, Bolton, England	Retained WBO Inter-Continental light-welterweight title
14	Win	14–0	Noe Nunez	TKO	3 (10), 2:58	19 Dec 2015	Manchester Arena, Manchester, England	Retained WBO Inter-Continental light-welterweight title
13	Win	13–0	Jarkko Putkonen	UD	10	10 Oct 2015	Manchester Arena, Manchester, England	Retained WBO Inter-Continental light-welterweight title
12	Win	12–0	Gabriel Fernando Punalef Calfin	TKO	6 (10), 1:20	11 Jul 2015	Manchester Velodrome, Manchester, England	Retained WBO Inter-Continental light-welterweight title
11	Win	11–0	Cesar David Inalef	TKO	5 (10), 1:03	6 Mar 2015	Echo Arena, Liverpool, England	Won vacant WBO Inter-Continental light-welterweight title
10	Win	10–0	Tom Stalker	TKO	8 (10), 2:48	25 Oct 2014	Echo Arena, Liverpool, England	Won vacant WBO European light-welterweight title
9	Win	9–0	Nathan Brough	TKO	2 (10), 0:58	26 Jul 2014	Phones 4u Arena, Manchester, England	Won vacant Central Area light-welterweight title
8	Win	8–0	Krzysztof Szot	PTS	8	10 May 2014	Olympia, Liverpool, England	
7	Win	7–0	Aleksas Vaseris	TKO	5 (6), 1:38	8 Mar 2014	Bowlers Exhibition Centre, Manchester, England	
6	Win	6–0	Renald Garrido	PTS	6	22 Nov 2013	Bowlers Exhibition Centre, Manchester, England	
5	Win	5–0	Tom Price	KO	2 (6), 1:53	7 Jun 2013	Winter Gardens, Blackpool, England	
4	Win	4–0	Mark McKray	PTS	4	27 Apr 2013	Sheffield Arena, Sheffield, England	
3	Win	3–0	Carl Allen	TKO	4 (4)	9 Mar 2013	De Vere Whites Hotel, Bolton, England	
2	Win	2–0	Johnny Greaves	TKO	1 (4), 1:46	14 Dec 2012	Winter Gardens, Blackpool, England	
1	Win	1–0	Carl Allen	PTS	4	22 Sep 2012	Bowlers Exhibition Centre, Manchester, England	

== See also ==
- List of male boxers
- List of southpaw stance boxers
- List of British world boxing champions
- List of world welterweight boxing champions

Sporting positions
Regional boxing titles
Vacant Title last held by Tyrone Nurse	Central Area light-welterweight champion 26 July 2014 – August 2014; Vacated	Vacant Title next held by Nathan Brough
Vacant Title last held by Aik Shakhnazaryan	WBO European light-welterweight champion 25 October 2014 – February 2015; Vacated	Vacant Title next held by Felix Lamm
Vacant Title last held by Bradley Saunders	WBO Inter-Continental light-welterweight champion 6 March 2015 – January 2019; Vacated	Vacant Title next held by Ray Beltrán
Preceded by Tyrone Nurse	British light-welterweight champion 21 October 2017 – June 2018; Vacated	Vacant Title next held by Robbie Davies Jr.
Vacant Title last held by Steve Claggett	WBO International light-welterweight champion 24 October 2024 – 15 February 2025; Failed to win interim world title	Vacant Title next held by Antonio Moran
Preceded by Harlem Eubank	IBF Inter-Continental welterweight champion 5 July 2025 – 2025; Vacated	Vacant Title next held by Conah Walker
Vacant Title last held by Lewis Crocker	WBA International welterweight champion 5 July 2025 – 2025; Vacated	Vacant Title next held by Conah Walker
Preceded by Ekow Essuman	WBO Global welterweight champion 15 November 2025 – 2026; Vacated	Vacant Title next held by Arnold Barboza Jr.
World boxing titles
Vacant Title last held by Rolando Romero as Champion	WBA welterweight champion Regular Title; 23 May 2026 – present	Incumbent
