= Darren Hamilton =

British former professional boxer (born 1978)

Personal information
- Nationality: British
- Born: 6 July 1978 (age 48) Bristol, England
- Height: 5 ft 8 in (173 cm)
- Weight: Light welterweight

Boxing career
- Reach: 69 in (175 cm)
- Stance: Orthodox

Boxing record
- Total fights: 19
- Wins: 16
- Win by KO: 3
- Losses: 3

Darren Hamilton (born 6 September 1978) is a British former professional boxer who competed from 2006 to 2015. He held the British super lightweight title from 2012 to 2014.

== Boxing career ==
Hamilton began his boxing career at the age of 12, when an uncle took him and a cousin to a local gym in Bristol. He would later go on to box for the St George's club in that city. As a schoolboy, he would fight in 27 amateur bouts, losing just four.

Hamilton showed considerable promise as an amateur, despite never making it to international level, or ever entering the senior ABA ranks. One memorable amateur fight was against Matty Teu, who had fought over 60 bouts when he met Hamilton, who was then a 'veteran' of just 12 bouts. Hamilton won the fight.

"I didn't have an active career; very stop start. In 1992 and 1993 I got to the national schoolboy semi-finals but lost on points in London both times. Most of the opponent's names have gone out of my head, sorry," Hamilton told Boxnation.

Hamilton collected Southern Area and British Masters titles on his rise to becoming British Champion. His bout for the latter crown was marked by some controversy, however, when he fought West Midlands area champion Dave Ryan. He beat Ryan at the second attempt, after being disqualified from the first fight for headbutting.

Guided by Spencer Fearon short notice fights were relished, first against John Watson, and then Ashley Theophane for the Lonsdale Belt. These fights took him from relative obscurity to become the British Light Welterweight Boxing Champion. Successful British Title defenses against the tough Steve Williams and the energetic Adil Anwar followed. However, in February 2014, Hamilton lost his British title to former professional footballer Curtis Woodhouse at the Hull Ice Arena. The fight was decided on points by a split decision. Regarding the decision, Hamilton told Sky Sports: "It could have gone either way. He had the advantage of being at home. It was a close fight. As the champion I should have dominated a lot more."

== Personal life ==
Hamilton was born on 6 September 1978, in Bristol, Avon, England. He has an elder sister, as well as four children of his own. His nickname is 'Ammo', something he says is partially derived from his tendency to talk a lot. "I talk a lot. Lyrically I've got loads of ammo!" he says. He now lives in Wanstead, east London.

Hamilton was homeless for a short period, before an offer to work as cleaner in a gym came along. "I took a job as a cleaner in a gym," he told the Bristol Post. "I lived in the towel cupboard for about four months. It wasn't ideal, but it was a start and for the first time in a long time I felt I was moving in the right direction."

== Professional boxing record ==
| 19 fights | 16 wins | 3 losses |
|---|---|---|
| By knockout | 3 | 1 |
| By decision | 13 | 2 |

| No. | Result | Record | Opponent | Type | Round, time | Date | Location | Notes |
|---|---|---|---|---|---|---|---|---|
| 19 | Win | 17–2 | (Russia) Mikhail Avakian | PTS | 6 | 13 Jun 2015 | (United Kingdom) Whitchurch Sports Centre, Bristol, England | |
| 18 | Win | 16–2 | (France) Steven Bloyer | PTS | 6 | 20 Sep 2014 | (United Kingdom) Wembley Arena, London, England | |
| 17 | Loss | 15–2 | (United Kingdom) Curtis Woodhouse | SD | 12 | 22 Feb 2014 | (United Kingdom) Ice Arena, Hull, England | Lost British super lightweight title |
| 16 | Win | 14–2 | (United Kingdom) Adil Anwar | UD | 12 | 6 Jul 2013 | (United Kingdom) Echo Arena, Liverpool, England | Retained British super lightweight title |
| 15 | Win | 13–2 | (United Kingdom) Stevie Williams | UD | 12 | 23 Feb 2013 | (United Kingdom) Echo Arena, Liverpool, England | Retained British super lightweight title |
| 14 | Win | 12–2 | (United Kingdom) Ashley Theophane | UD | 12 | 19 May 2012 | (United Kingdom) Aintree Equestrian Centre, Liverpool, England | Won British super lightweight title |
| 13 | Win | 11–2 | (United Kingdom) John Watson | PTS | 8 | 27 Apr 2012 | (United Kingdom) Echo Arena, Liverpool, England | |
| 12 | Win | 10–2 | (Kenya) Geoffrey Munika | TKO | 5 (6) | 23 Mar 2012 | (United Kingdom) The Troxy, London, England | |
| 11 | Win | 9–2 | (United Kingdom) Dave Ryan | PTS | 10 | 7 Oct 2011 | (United Kingdom) York Hall, London, England | |
| 10 | Loss | 8–2 | (United Kingdom) Dave Ryan | DQ | 1 (10) | 18 Jun 2011 | (United Kingdom) York Hall, London, England | |
| 9 | Win | 8–1 | (Republic of Ireland) Peter McDonagh | TKO | 8 (10) | 18 Mar 2011 | (United Kingdom) York Hall, London, England | Won British Southern Area super lightweight title |
| 8 | Win | 7–1 | (United Kingdom) Daniel Thorpe | PTS | 4 | 27 Nov 2010 | (United Kingdom) Magna Centre, Rotherham, England | |
| 7 | Win | 6–1 | (United Kingdom) Ideh Ochuko | PTS | 4 (4) | 4 Jun 2010 | (United Kingdom) York Hall, London, England | |
| 6 | Loss | 5–1 | (United Kingdom) Daryl Setterfield | TKO | 4 (4) | 26 Mar 2010 | (United Kingdom) Goresbrook Leisure Centre, Essex, England | |
| 5 | Win | 5–0 | (United Kingdom) Johnny Greaves | TKO | 3 (6) | 10 Dec 2007 | (United Kingdom) Holiday Inn, Peterborough, England | |
| 4 | Win | 4–0 | (United Kingdom) Byron Vince | PTS | 6 | 28 Nov 2007 | (United Kingdom) Cafe Royal, London, England | |
| 3 | Win | 3–0 | (United Kingdom) James Lilley | PTS | 6 | 24 Feb 2007 | (United Kingdom) Filton College Wise Campus, Bristol, England | |
| 2 | Win | 2–0 | (United Kingdom) Jaz Virdee | PTS | 6 | 7 Dec 2006 | (United Kingdom) Holiday Inn, Peterborough, England | |
| 1 | Win | 1–0 | (United Kingdom) Neil McQuade | PTS | 6 | 3 Nov 2006 | (United Kingdom) Dolman Exhibition Hall, Bristol, England | |
