= Johnny Greaves =

Johnny Greaves may refer to:

- Johnny Greaves (boxer), English boxer
- Johnny Greaves (racing driver), American racing driver
- Johnny Greaves (rugby league), Australian rugby league player
