= Petr Petrov =

Russian boxer

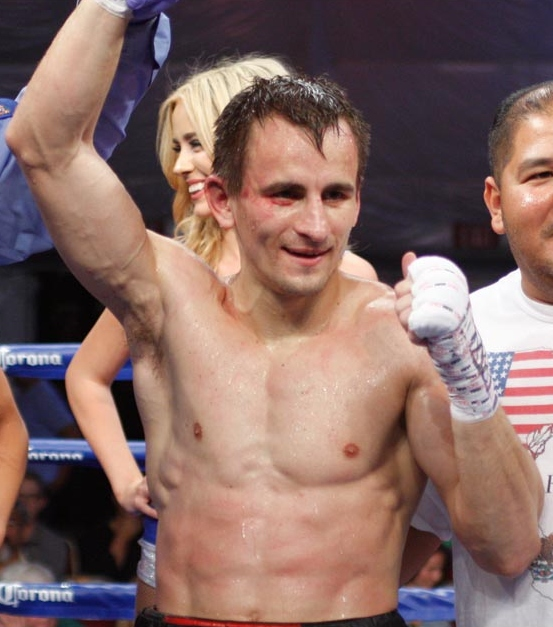
- Petrov celebrating his victory over Fedor Papazov, 2014

Personal information
- Nicknames: El Zar ("The Tsar"); The Machine
- Nationality: Russian
- Born: 28 March 1983 (age 43) Ryazan, Russian SFSR, Soviet Union (now Russian Federation)
- Height: 1.68 m (5 ft 6 in)
- Weight: Super-featherweight; Lightweight; Light-welterweight

Boxing career
- Reach: 177 cm (70 in)
- Stance: Orthodox

Boxing record
- Total fights: 51
- Wins: 42
- Win by KO: 23
- Losses: 7
- Draws: 2

Petr Petrov (Russian: Пётр Петров; born 28 March 1983) is a Russian professional boxer. He has challenged twice for a world title, at light-welterweight in 2011 and at lightweight in 2017.

== Early life ==
At the age of sixteen Petrov moved to Madrid, Spain, as his parents worked there on business. He resides and trains there to this day, and speaks fluent Spanish as well as some English.

== Professional career ==
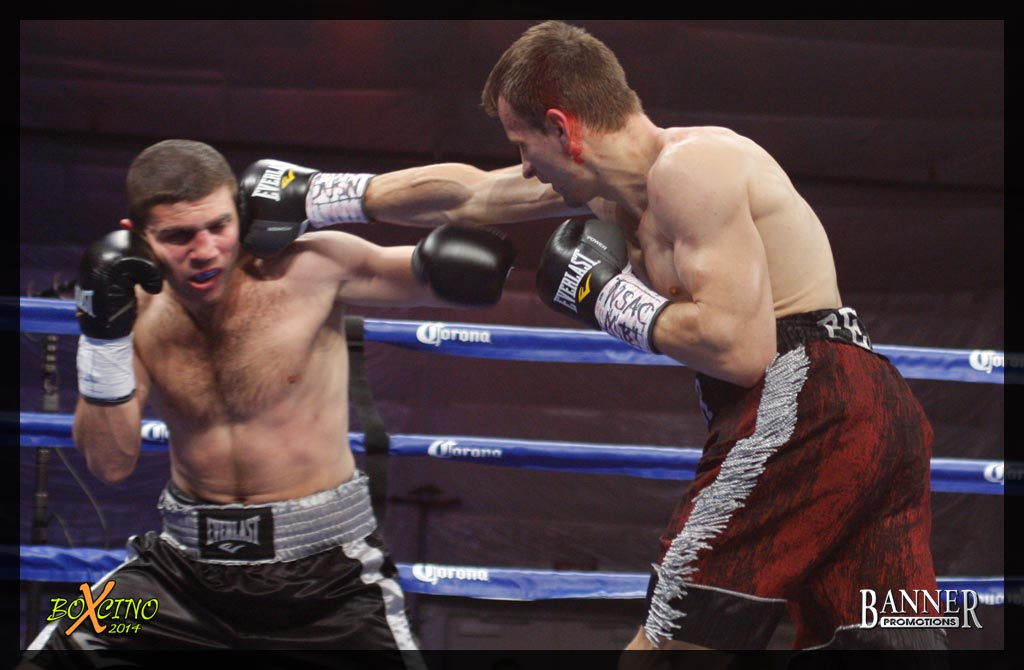
Petrov (right) vs. Papazov, 2014

Petrov made his professional debut on 10 November 2000, winning a four-round points decision against Gabriel Pedro Silva Guerra. Fighting almost exclusively in Spain for the next decade, Petrov received his first world championship opportunity on 23 September 2011, when he faced WBA (Regular) super-lightweight champion Marcos Maidana. In front of Maidana's native Argentine crowd, Petrov suffered two knockdowns and was knocked out in four rounds.

Throughout 2014, Petrov fought in the United States for the first time and participated in ESPN's Boxcino lightweight tournament, as part of their Friday Night Fights series. He won his quarter- and semi-final matches against Fedor Papazov (six-round unanimous decision on 21 February) and Chris Rudd (fourth-round stoppage on 28 March), and the tournament final on 23 May by stopping Fernando Carcamo in eight rounds. During this time he also won the regional WBA–NABA and WBO–NABO titles. On 30 September 2016, Petrov dominated Michael Pérez in bloody fashion to force a corner stoppage in the sixth round, which earned him a mandatory opportunity for both the WBA and WBO lightweight world titles.

On 23 January 2017, promoter Frank Warren confirmed that Petrov would face WBO lightweight champion Terry Flanagan on 8 April, in Manchester.

== Professional boxing record ==
51 fights	42 wins	7 losses
By knockout	23	3
By decision	19	4
Draws	2	

No.	Result	Record	Opponent	Type	Round, time	Date	Location	Notes
51	Loss	42–7–2	Khariton Agrba	TKO	3 (10), 2:50	24 Dec 2021	USC Soviet Wings, Moscow, Russia	For vacant IBF European super-lightweight title
50	Win	42–6–2	Michel Marcano	KO	4 (10), 1:59	26 Jun 2020	Plaza de Toros de las Cruces, Guadalajara, Spain	
49	Win	41–6–2	Dedrick Bell	KO	2 (8), 2:48	20 Sep 2019	Doubletree Hotel, Ontario, California, US	
48	Win	40–6–2	Ruben Tamayo	KO	2 (8), 2:59	10 May 2019	Omega Products International, Corona, California, US	
47	Win	39–6–2	Hermin Isava	TKO	3 (8)	23 Mar 2019	Pabellón Polideportivo Feria, Spain	
46	Loss	38–6–2	Ivan Baranchyk	TKO	8 (12), 1:12	9 Mar 2018	Mountain Grand, Deadwood, South Dakota, US	
45	Loss	38–5–2	Terry Flanagan	UD	12	8 Apr 2017	Manchester Arena, Manchester, England	For WBO lightweight title
44	Win	38–4–2	Michael Pérez	RTD	6 (12), 3:00	30 Sep 2016	Fantasy Springs Resort Casino, Palm Springs, California, US	
43	Win	37–4–2	Marvin Quintero	RTD	6 (10), 3:00	6 May 2016	Toshiba Plaza, Las Vegas, Nevada, US	Retained WBA–NABA lightweight title; Won vacant NABF lightweight title
42	Win	36–4–2	Gamaliel Díaz	UD	10	3 Apr 2015	Omega Products International, Corona, California, US	Retained WBA–NABA lightweight title; Won vacant WBO–NABO lightweight title
41	Win	35–4–2	Fernando Carcamo	TKO	8 (10), 0:40	23 May 2014	Turning Stone Resort Casino, Verona, New York, US	Won vacant WBA–NABA and WBO–NABO interim lightweight titles; ESPN Friday Night Fights Boxcino tournament: lightweight final
40	Win	34–4–2	Chris Rudd	TKO	4 (8), 0:51	28 Mar 2014	4 Bears Casino & Lodge, New Town, North Dakota, US	ESPN Friday Night Fights Boxcino tournament: lightweight semi-final
39	Win	33–4–2	Fedor Papazov	UD	6	21 Feb 2014	Edgewater Hotel and Casino, Laughlin, Nevada, US	ESPN Friday Night Fights Boxcino tournament: lightweight quarter-final
38	Loss	32–4–2	Dejan Zlaticanin	UD	12	13 Apr 2013	Topolica Sport Hall, Bar, Montenegro	For WBC International lightweight title
37	Win	32–3–2	Mikheil Avakyan	TKO	6 (10)	24 Nov 2012	Polideportivo Municipal Dehesa Boyal, San Sebastián de los Reyes, Spain	
36	Win	31–3–2	Kakhaber Avetisian	UD	10	26 May 2012	Sage2000, Madrid, Spain	
35	Win	30–3–2	Sergio Jose Olivas	TKO	1 (12)	11 Feb 2012	Plaza de Toros, Illescas, Spain	Won vacant WBC Latino interim super-lightweight title
34	Loss	29–3–2	Marcos Maidana	KO	4 (12), 2:44	23 Sep 2011	Sociedad Alemana de Gimnasia de Villa Ballester, José León Suárez, Argentina	For WBA (Regular) super-lightweight title
33	Win	29–2–2	Matias Garcia	PTS	6	8 Jul 2011	Hesperia Tower, L'Hospitalet de Llobregat, Spain	
32	Win	28–2–2	Angel Hugo Ramirez	KO	4 (8)	27 May 2011	Casal Cultural i Recreatiu, Castellbisbal, Spain	
31	Win	27–2–2	Moises Castro	KO	4 (6)	25 Mar 2011	Navalcarnero, Spain	
30	Win	26–2–2	Arturo Uruzquieta	TKO	7 (10)	26 Nov 2010	La Cubierta, Leganés, Spain	Won vacant WBC Latino interim lightweight title
29	Win	25–2–2	Carlos Winston Velasquez	PTS	6	14 Nov 2009	Gimnasio del Rayo Vallecano, Madrid, Spain	
28	Win	24–2–2	Ignacio Mendoza	PTS	8	10 Oct 2009	Polideportivo Municipal José Caballero, Alcobendas, Spain	
27	Win	23–2–2	Marius Racaru	PTS	6	23 May 2009	Gimnasio del Rayo Vallecano, Madrid, Spain	
26	Win	22–2–2	Maximo Diaz Ayca	KO	1 (6)	4 Apr 2009	La Cubierta, Leganés, Spain	
25	Win	21–2–2	Armando Candel	TKO	2 (6)	7 Feb 2009	Gimnasio del Rayo Vallecano, Madrid, Spain	
24	Win	20–2–2	Marian Cazacu	UD	6	31 Oct 2008	Alcobendas, Spain	
23	Win	19–2–2	Carlos Cardenas	UD	8	5 Jul 2008	León, Spain	
22	Win	18–2–2	Euclides Espitia	PTS	6	31 May 2008	Polideportivo Municipal Dehesa Boyal, San Sebastián de los Reyes, Spain	
21	Win	17–2–2	Constantin Stan	UD	6	9 Feb 2008	Estadio Rayo Vallecano, Madrid, Spain	
20	Loss	16–2–2	Vitali Tajbert	UD	8	20 Oct 2007	Gerry Weber Stadion, Halle, Germany	
19	Draw	16–1–2	Ignacio Mendoza	PTS	12	2 Mar 2007	Polideportivo Municipal, Legutio, Spain	For vacant WBC Latino super-featherweight title
18	Win	16–1–1	Sunday Aderoju	TKO	3 (6)	11 Nov 2006	Ciudad Real, Spain	
17	Win	15–1–1	Sergei Nikitin	TKO	3 (6)	7 Oct 2006	Pabellón La Solidaridad, Fuenlabrada, Spain	
16	Win	14–1–1	Youssouf Djibaba	PTS	8	3 Feb 2006	Santa Cruz de Tenerife, Canary Islands	
15	Win	13–1–1	Nelson Lau Fu	TKO	4 (6)	4 Nov 2005	La Cubierta, Leganés, Spain	
14	Win	12–1–1	Juan Del Valle	TKO	7 (8)	4 Mar 2005	León, Spain	
13	Win	11–1–1	Sunday Aderoju	PTS	6	3 Dec 2004	Almeria, Spain	
12	Win	10–1–1	Juan Garcia	TKO	3 (6)	11 Jun 2004	La Cubierta, Leganés, Spain	
11	Win	9–1–1	Manuel Gomes	PTS	6	16 Apr 2004	La Cubierta, Leganés, Spain	
10	Win	8–1–1	Ubadel Soto	PTS	6	23 Jan 2004	Tarragona, Spain	
9	Loss	7–1–1	Ubadel Soto	SD	6	5 Sep 2003	Polideportivo del Val de Alcala, Alcalá de Henares, Spain	
8	Win	7–0–1	Juan Del Valle	UD	4	9 May 2003	La Cubierta, Leganés, Spain	
7	Win	6–0–1	Jorge Lohoba	UD	6	7 Feb 2003	La Cubierta, Leganés, Spain	
6	Draw	5–0–1	Francisco Nohales	PTS	6	12 Jul 2002	Campo de fútbol Las Américas, Parla, Spain	
5	Win	5–0	Abdelasis Abdellah Mohamed	TKO	6 (6)	26 Apr 2002	Palau Blaugrana, Barcelona, Spain	
4	Win	4–0	Mohamed El Idrissi	TKO	4 (6)	15 Feb 2002	Palau Blaugrana, Barcelona, Spain	
3	Win	3–0	Juan Pintor	UD	6	11 Jan 2002	Palau Blaugrana, Barcelona, Spain	
2	Win	2–0	Jose Luis Fernandez	TKO	2 (4)	23 Mar 2001	Zaragoza, Spain	
1	Win	1–0	Gabriel Pedro Silva Guerra	PTS	4	10 Nov 2000	Santander, Spain	

Sporting positions
Regional boxing titles
Vacant Title last held by Richar Abril	WBC Latino lightweight champion Interim title 26 November 2010 – December 2010; Vacated	Vacant Title next held by Juan Ramon Solis
Vacant Title last held by Vicente Mosquera	WBC Latino super-lightweight champion Interim title 11 February 2012 – March 2012; Vacated	Vacant Title next held by Gustavo David Bermudez
Vacant Title last held by Samuel Kotey Neequaye	WBA–NABA lightweight champion 23 May 2014 – April 2017; Vacated	Vacant Title next held by Tony Luis
Vacant Title last held by Raymundo Beltrán	WBO–NABO lightweight champion Interim title 23 May 2014 – March 2015; Vacated	Vacant Title next held by Ismael Barroso
Vacant Title last held by Ismael Barroso	WBO–NABO lightweight champion 3 April 2015 – July 2015; Vacated	Vacant Title next held by Michael Pérez
Vacant Title last held by Marvin Quintero	NABF lightweight champion 6 May 2016 – September 2016; Vacated	Vacant Title next held by Raymundo Beltrán
