= Dave Ryan (boxer) =

English boxer (born 1983)

Personal information
- Nickname: Rocky
- Nationality: English
- Born: 6 May 1983 (age 43) Derby, England
- Height: 5 ft 11 in (180 cm)
- Weight: Light-welterweight; Welterweight

Boxing career
- Stance: Orthodox

Boxing record
- Total fights: 27
- Wins: 17
- Win by KO: 4
- Losses: 10

Dave Ryan (born 6 May 1983) is an English former professional boxer who was Commonwealth super-lightweight champion from October 2014 to September 2015.

== Career ==
Ryan beat Tyrone Nurse by majority decision at the First Direct Arena in Leeds on 4 October 2014 to win the vacant Commonwealth super-lightweight title.

He successfully defended the title by stopping John Wayne Hibbert in the ninth round of their fight at the O2 Arena in London on 30 May 2015.

Ryan lost the championship in a rematch against Hibbert at the same venue on 12 September 2015, when he suffered a back injury in the 10th round.

He tried to regain the title, which was once again vacant, in a fight with Josh Taylor at Meadowbank Stadium in Edinburgh on 21 October 2016, but lost by fifth round stoppage.

== Professional boxing record ==
| 27 fights | 17 wins | 10 losses |
|---|---|---|
| By knockout | 4 | 2 |
| By decision | 12 | 8 |
| By disqualification | 1 | 0 |

| No. | Result | Record | Opponent | Type | Round, time | Date | Location | Notes |
|---|---|---|---|---|---|---|---|---|
| 27 | Loss | 17–10 | Josh Taylor | TKO | 5 (12), 2:45 | 21 Oct 2016 | Meadowbank Sports Centre | For vacant Commonwealth light welterweight title |
| 26 | Loss | 17–9 | John Wayne Hibbert | TKO | 10 (12), 1:43 | 12 Sep 2015 | The O2 Arena, London, England | Lost Commonwealth and WBC International light welterweight titles |
| 25 | Win | 17–8 | John Wayne Hibbert | TKO | 9 (12), 2:00 | 30 May 2015 | The O2 Arena, London, England | Retained Commonwealth light welterweight title; Won WBC International light welterweight title |
| 24 | Win | 16–8 | Tyrone Nurse | MD | 12 | 4 Oct 2014 | First Direct Arena, Leeds, England | Won vacant Commonwealth light welterweight title |
| 23 | Win | 15–8 | Paul McCloskey | PTS | 8 | 21 Dec 2013 | First Direct Arena, Leeds, England | |
| 22 | Loss | 14–8 | Sam Eggington | PTS | 10 | 23 Nov 2013 | Holte Suite, Birmingham, England | |
| 21 | Win | 14–7 | John Wayne Hibbert | PTS | 10 | 9 Mar 2013 | Civic Hall, Grays, England | |
| 20 | Loss | 13–7 | Curtis Woodhouse | MD | 10 | 28 Sep 2012 | Magna Centre, Rotherham, England | For vacant English light welterweight title |
| 19 | Loss | 13–6 | Adil Anwar | UD | 10 | 19 May 2012 | Aintree Equestrian Centre, Liverpool, England | |
| 18 | Win | 13–5 | Chris Truman | PTS | 10 | 27 Apr 2012 | Pride Park Stadium, Derby, England | Retained Midlands Area light welterweight title |
| 17 | Loss | 12–5 | Darren Hamilton | PTS | 10 | 7 Oct 2011 | York Hall, London, England | |
| 16 | Win | 12–4 | Darren Hamilton | DQ | 1 (10), 1:32 | 18 Jun 2011 | York Hall, London, England | Hamilton disqualified for use of the head |
| 15 | Win | 11–4 | Gavin Deacon | TKO | 1 (10), 1:08 | 28 May 2011 | Derby Rugby Club, Derby, England | Retained Midlands Area light welterweight title |
| 14 | Win | 10–4 | Leonard Lothian | PTS | 10 | 27 Feb 2011 | Heritage Hotel, Derby, England | Won vacant Midlands Area light welterweight title |
| 13 | Loss | 9–4 | Stephen Haughian | PTS | 8 | 3 Dec 2010 | Ulster Hall, Belfast, Northern Ireland | |
| 12 | Loss | 9–3 | Kevin McCauley | PTS | 10 | 2 Oct 2010 | Heritage Hotel, Derby, England | Lost Midlands Area welterweight title |
| 11 | Loss | 9–2 | Michael Lomax | PTS | 6 | 9 Apr 2010 | Alexandra Palace, London, England | |
| 10 | Win | 9–1 | Scott Evans | TKO | 2 (10), 1:50 | 10 May 2009 | Heritage Hotel, Derby, England | Won vacant Midlands Area welterweight title |
| 9 | Win | 8–1 | Jamie Way | PTS | 4 | 27 Feb 2009 | Metrodome, Barnsley, England | |
| 8 | Win | 7–1 | Jason Nesbitt | PTS | 4 | 16 Nov 2008 | Heritage Hotel, Derby, England | |
| 7 | Win | 6–1 | Carl Allen | PTS | 8 | 22 Jun 2008 | Derby University, Derby, England | |
| 6 | Win | 5–1 | Carl Allen | PTS | 4 | 10 May 2008 | Nottingham Arena, Nottingham, England | |
| 5 | Loss | 4–1 | Scott Wolford | PTS | 4 | 30 Nov 2007 | Newham Leisure Centre, London, England | |
| 4 | Win | 4–0 | Baz Carey | PTS | 6 | 3 Nov 2007 | Hilton East Midlands Airport Hotel, Derby, England | |
| 3 | Win | 3–0 | Alby Hunt | TKO | 2 (6), 1:35 | 16 Sep 2007 | Heritage Hotel, Derby, England | |
| 2 | Win | 2–0 | Leonard Lothian | PTS | 6 | 19 May 2007 | Victoria Leisure Centre, Nottingham, England | |
| 1 | Win | 1–0 | Deniss Sirjatovs | PTS | 6 | 31 Mar 2007 | Pride Park Stadium, Derby, England | |
