= Alan Bosworth =

English boxer (born 1967)

Personal information
- Nickname: Bozzy
- Nationality: English
- Born: Alan Bosworth; 31 December 1967 (age 58) Northampton, England, UK
- Height: 5 ft 7 in (1.70 m)
- Weight: Light Welterweight

Boxing career

Boxing record
- Total fights: 38
- Wins: 20
- Win by KO: 6
- Losses: 16
- Draws: 2
- No contests: 0

Alan Bosworth (born 31 December 1967 in Northampton, England), is a professional boxer, using the nickname "Bozzy". He is a light welterweight, and a former British and European title challenger at the weight. A Former Champion of England & IBF Intercontinental Title Challenger

Bosworth has fought several notable fighters throughout his career including former world champions Junior Witter, George Scott, Jan Piet Bergman, Shea Neary, Eamonn Magee, Colin Dunne and World title challengers Ashley Theophane, Matthew hatton, Stephen Smith, Allan Vester

== Professional career ==
Bosworth's professional boxing career began in October 1995, with a 2nd round knockout of Simon Hamblett. Bosworth was undefeated in his first nine fights, before suffering a 5th round cut eye in a British lightweight title eliminator at the hands of Wayne Rigby in March 1997. Bosworth was also knocked out in the 8th round of his next fight against Colin Dunne.

On 24 April 1999, Bosworth was knocked out in the 6th round of a fight against Jan Piet Bergman in Germany. Bergman had previously challenged Kostya Tszyu for the IBF light welterweight title.

On 3 March 2000, Bosworth traveled to Denmark where he was defeated by Allan Vester via a unanimous decision for the IBF intercontinental title. A month later, Bosworth returned to Denmark to lose a decision in a fight with former world title challenger George Scott. On 13 March 2001, Bosworth was stopped in the 5th round of a fight against Eamonn Magee.

=== British Title ===
On 23 November 2001, Bosworth defeated Daniel James after James being floored via a 7th round stoppage in an eliminator for the vacant British light welterweight title. The title had been vacated by Ricky Hatton. On 16 March 2002, Bosworth was defeated by Junior Witter via a 3rd-round knockout in a fight for the vacant title. Following this fight, sept 2002 Bosworth was defeated by Eamonn Magee in the 5th round for a second time. January 2003 Bosworth lost a close points decision to oscar hall in a British light welterweight title eliminator

On 25 July 2003, Bosworth defeated Gavin Down via a 5th-round knockout in an eliminator for the British light welterweight title. Bosworth did not receive a British title fight, but was given a shot at the vacant English light welterweight title. On 11 December 2003, Bosworth defeated Stephen Smith on a points decision to win the vacant title.

=== European Title ===
On 12 November 2004, Bosworth was defeated by Francie Barrett via a close point's decision in a challenge for the European light welterweight title. In May 2005, Bosworth was defeated by Nigel Wright on points in the first defence of his English light welterweight title.

On 20 October 2006, Bosworth defeated Matthew Hatton via 10th Round disqualification in an eliminator for the British welterweight title. Bosworth's last fight was a 7th-round knockout defeat against Ashley Theophanein British Light-welterweight title eliminator) on 20 January 2007.

== Championships Held ==
Bosworth beat Ricky Hatton opponent & former World Title challenger Stephen Smith for the national title. the English Light Welterweight title Championship
