= Spencer Fearon =

English boxing promoter and media personality

Spencer Fearon (born 20 December 1973, Brixton, London, England) is a boxing promoter and media personality.

Fearon is the former manager and promoter of, amongst others, British light-welterweight champion Darren Hamilton, Prizefighter junior middleweight champion Larry Ekundayo and former southern area junior middleweight champion Nathan Graham.

He formerly appeared in Sky Sports' weekly podcast Toe 2 Toe with Ed Robinson.

== Career ==
A former boxer himself, fighting under the nickname 'The Spirit', he became the youngest ever black promoter in Britain, when promoting his first bill on 9 October 2007. His record consisted of 11 wins and 6 losses

Along with Ciaran Baynes, in March 2009 he set up Hard Knocks Boxing Promotions which earned plaudits from boxing fans and commentators alike for its focus on 50-50 match-ups and bringing back to the ring the Mongolian Warrior Choi Tseveenpurev.

Under Fearon's stewardship as manager and cornerman, Choi rejuvenated his career winning the featherweight Prizefighter in October 2011 and performed creditably a year later against IBO featherweight champion Daud Yordan. Kreshnik Qato also won the English middleweight title as part of the Hard Knocks team in June 2012.

Fearon previously served as a commentator for Frank Warren TV and until recently worked for Setanta Sports where his interviews with the likes of Mike Tyson, Roy Jones, Joe Calzaghe, David Haye and Amir Khan aired on Setanta Sports News and Steve Bunce's Boxing Hour.

During his boxing career he was used as the model for the body graphics for popular computer game Shadowman in 1998 and appeared in the 2006 film Rollin' with the Nines.

== Boxing career ==
After a promising amateur career, where he won the London ABA novices and London boys club welterweight titles, he was stopped in the first round of the final of the south east divisional Light Middleweight championships in Bexleyheath in February 1995 against the future British European & WBU champion Wayne Alexander. Fearon turned professional in 1997 and had a stop-start career he compiled a record of 11 wins and 6 losses from 17 fights before retiring in 2003. His penultimate bout with David Walker was voted the 2003 fight of the year by the BBC website.

His flourishing media career began after appearing in documentaries alongside childhood friend Danny Williams.

Spencer has also worked as cornerman and adviser to Williams and light middleweight contender Anthony Small.
