= Tyrone Nurse =

British professional boxer (born 1990)

Personal information
- Born: 4 January 1990 (age 36) Huddersfield, West Yorkshire, England
- Height: 5 ft 11 in (180 cm)
- Weight: Light welterweight; Welterweight

Boxing career
- Stance: Orthodox

Boxing record
- Total fights: 46
- Wins: 37
- Win by KO: 7
- Losses: 7
- Draws: 2

Tyrone Nurse (born 4 January 1990) is a British former professional boxer. He held the British super-lightweight title from 2015 to 2017 and challenged once for the Commonwealth super-lightweight title in 2014.

== Career ==
Nurse made his professional debut in March 2008 with a win over Kristian Laight. After winning his first 20 fights, he competed in the Prizefighter tournament on 11 February 2012, losing in the final to Adil Anwar.

On 15 February 2013 he stopped Joe Elfidh in the second round to take the vacant Central Area super-lightweight title, and in September 2013 was due to face Shayne Singleton for the vacant English title. Singleton pulled out of the fight after failing to make the weight, with Nurse beating late replacement Krzysztof Szot on points. In April 2014 he got his title shot and beat Tyler Goodjohn by unanimous decision to take it.

On 4 October 2014 he faced Dave Ryan for the vacant Commonwealth super-lightweight title, losing by majority decision.

Nurse faced Chris Jenkins for the vacant British super-lightweight title on 18 July 2015 at the Manchester Arena, the fight ending as a majority draw. They met again in November with Nurse getting a unanimous decision to become British champion.

He successfully defended the title with a ninth round stoppage win over Willie Limond at the SSE Hydro in Glasgow on 28 May 2016, a unanimous decision success against Tommy Coyle at First Direct Arena in Leeds on 30 July 2016 and a majority draw with Joe Hughes at Leicester Arena on 22 April 2017.

In his fourth defense, Nurse lost the title to Jack Catterall by unanimous decision at the First Direct Arena in Leeds on 21 October 2017.

Switching weight categories, Nurse challenged English welterweight champion, Ekow Essuman, at Harvey Hadden Sports Village in Nottingham on 16 March 2019, losing via majority decision.

In what transpired to be his final fight, Nurse lost to Kerman Lejarraga by unanimous decision in a 10-round contest at Plaza de Toros de Puerto Banus in Marbella, Spain, on 8 August 2020.

Having not fought since August 2020, Nurse announced his retirement from professional boxing in February 2025.

== Professional boxing record ==
46 fights	37 wins	7 losses
By knockout	7	0
By decision	30	7
Draws	2	

No.	Result	Record	Opponent	Type	Round, time	Date	Location	Notes
46	Loss	37–7–2	Kerman Lejarraga	PTS	10	8 August 2020	Plaza de Toros de Puerto Banus, Marbella, Spain	
45	Win	37–6–2	Fernando Valencia	PTS	6	20 September 2019	Ponds Forge Arena, Sheffield, England	
44	Win	36–6–2	Óscar Amador	PTS	6	5 July 2019	Ponds Forge Arena, Sheffield, England	
43	Loss	35–6–2	Ekow Essuman	MD	10	16 March 2019	Harvey Hadden Sports Village, Nottingham, England	For English welterweight title
42	Loss	35–5–2	Liam Taylor	SD	10	17 November 2018	Victoria Warehouse, Manchester, England	
41	Loss	35–4–2	Jack Brubaker	UD	12	24 May 2018	The Star, Sydney, Australia	
40	Loss	35–3–2	Jack Catterall	UD	12	21 October 2017	First Direct Arena, Leeds, England	Lost British super lightweight title
39	Win	35–2–2	Andy Keates	PTS	8	13 May 2017	First Direct Arena, Leeds, England	
38	Draw	34–2–2	Joe Hughes	SD	12	22 April 2017	Leicester Arena, Leicester, England	Retained British super lightweight title
37	Win	34–2–1	Tommy Coyle	UD	12	30 July 2016	First Direct Arena, Leeds, England	Retained British super lightweight title
36	Win	33–2–1	Willie Limond	TKO	9 (12) 1:54	28 May 2016	SSE Hydro, Glasgow, Scotland	Retained British super lightweight title
35	Win	32–2–1	Chris Jenkins	UD	12	21 November 2015	Manchester Arena, Manchester, England	Won British super lightweight title
34	Draw	31–2–1	Chris Jenkins	MD	12	18 July 2015	Manchester Arena, Manchester, England	For vacant British super lightweight title
33	Win	31–2	Liam Taylor	UD	10	11 April 2015	First Direct Arena, Leeds, England	
32	Win	30–2	Radoslav Mitev	KO	4 (6) 2:38	28 November 2014	Bowlers Exhibition Center, Manchester, England	
31	Loss	29–2	Dave Ryan	MD	12	4 October 2014	First Direct Arena, Leeds, England	For vacant Commonwealth super lightweight title
30	Win	29–1	Danny Little	PTS	6	21 May 2014	First Direct Arena, Leeds, England	
29	Win	28–1	Tyler Goodjohn	UD	10	19 April 2014	Phones 4u Arena, Manchester, England	Won vacant English super lightweight title
28	Win	27–1	Krysztof Szot	PTS	8	20 September 2013	Bowlers Exhibition Center, Manchester, England	
27	Win	26–1	Mark McKray	PTS	6	1 June 2013	Bowlers Exhibition Center, Manchester, England	
26	Win	25–1	Joe Elfidh	TKO	2 (10), 1:38	15 February 2013	Doncaster Dome, Doncaster, England	Won vacant Central Area super lightweight title
25	Win	24–1	Santos Medrano	PTS	8	20 October 2012	Sheffield Arena, Sheffield, England	
24	Win	23–1	Karoly Lakatos	PTS	6	30 June 2012	North Bridge Leisure Center, Halifax, England	
23	Loss	22–1	Adil Anwar	UD	3	11 February 2012	Civic Hall, Wolverhampton, England	Prizefighter: The Light Welterweights II - Final
22	Win	22–0	Young Mutley	UD	3	11 February 2012	Civic Hall, Wolverhampton, England	Prizefighter: The Light Welterweights II - Semifinal
21	Win	21–0	Dale Miles	TKO	3 (3), 0:31	11 February 2012	Civic Hall, Wolverhampton, England	Prizefighter: The Light Welterweights II - Quarterfinal
20	Win	20–0	Ivar Godor	PTS	6	11 November 2011	North Bridge Leisure Center, Halifax, England	
19	Win	19–0	Istvan Kiss	TKO	5 (6), 2:49	8 October 2011	Ponds Forge Arena, Sheffield, England	
18	Win	18–0	Ben Lawler	RTD	4 (6), 3:00	23 July 2011	Huddersfield Sports Center, Huddersfield, England	
17	Win	17–0	William Warburton	PTS	6	21 May 2011	North Bridge Leisure Center, Halifax, England	
16	Win	16–0	Damian Owen	PTS	6	5 March 2011	Huddersfield Sports Center, Huddersfield, England	
15	Win	15–0	Julius Rafael	PTS	4	2 December 2010	Cedar Court Hotel, Huddersfield, England	
14	Win	14–0	Ibrar Riyaz	PTS	10	9 October 2010	Huddersfield Sports Center, Huddersfield, England	
13	Win	13–0	Johnny Greaves	TKO	5 (6), 0:30	28 May 2010	Huddersfield Sports Center, Huddersfield, England	
12	Win	12–0	Adam Kelly	PTS	6	5 March 2010	Huddersfield Sports Center, Huddersfield, England	
11	Win	11–0	William Warburton	PTS	6	6 December 2009	Brooklands Hotel, Barnsley, England	
10	Win	10–0	Jason Nesbitt	PTS	6	31 October 2009	Huddersfield Sports Center, Huddersfield, England	
9	Win	9–0	Daniel Thorpe	PTS	4	11 September 2009	Brentwood Center, Essex, England	
8	Win	8–0	Ibrar Riyaz	PTS	4	25 May 2009	Tara Leisure Center, Lancashire, England	
7	Win	7–0	Johnny Greaves	PTS	4	17 April 2009	Leigh Sports Village, Lancashire, England	
6	Win	6–0	Baz Carey	PTS	4	27 February 2009	Metrodome, Barnsley, England	
5	Win	5–0	Sid Razak	PTS	4	21 December 2008	De Vere Whites Hotel, Bolton, England	
4	Win	4–0	Fred Janes	PTS	4	4 December 2008	Hilton Hotel, Bradford, England	
3	Win	3–0	Carl Allen	PTS	4	28 September 2008	Municipal Hall, Lancashire, England	
2	Win	2–0	Carl Allen	PTS	4	5 September 2008	Harvey Hadden Sports Village, Nottingham, England	
1	Win	1–0	Kristian Laight	PTS	4	28 March 2008	Metrodome, Barnsley, England	
