= Curtis Woodhouse =

English footballer and boxer (born 1980)

Curtis Woodhouse BEM
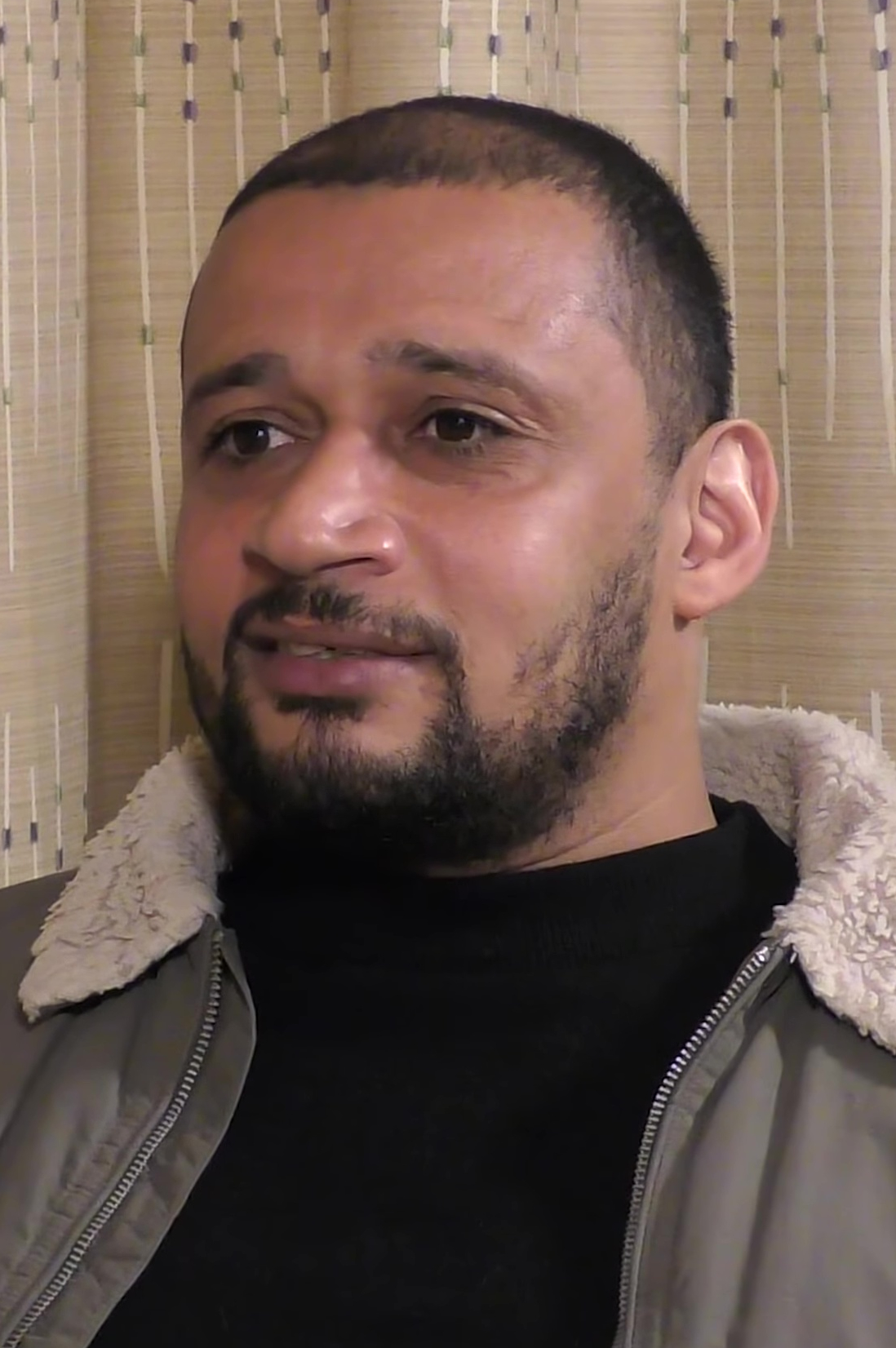
- Woodhouse in 2021

Personal information
- Full name: Curtis Woodhouse
- Date of birth: 17 April 1980 (age 46)
- Place of birth: Beverley, England
- Height: 5 ft 8 in (1.73 m)
- Position: Midfielder

Youth career
- 1994–1997: York City

Senior career*
Years	Team	Apps	(Gls)
1997–2001	Sheffield United	104	(6)
2001–2003	Birmingham City	48	(2)
2003	→ Rotherham United (loan)	11	(0)
2003–2005	Peterborough United	61	(11)
2005–2006	Hull City	18	(0)
2006	Grimsby Town	16	(1)
2006–2007	Rushden & Diamonds	5	(1)
2007–2009	Rushden & Diamonds	60	(5)
2009	Mansfield Town	12	(0)
2009–2010	Harrogate Town		
2010–2011	Sheffield	12	(0)
2011–2012	Eastwood Town	0	(0)
2012	Sheffield	0	(0)
Total		347	(26)

International career
1999	England U21	4	(0)

Managerial career
- 2012: Sheffield
- 2014–2015: Goole
- 2015–2016: Hull United
- 2016–2018: Bridlington Town
- 2019: Tadcaster Albion
- 2019–2021: Gainsborough Trinity
- 2022–2023: Marske United
- * Club domestic league appearances and goals

Curtis Woodhouse
Personal information
- Nicknames: The Driffield Destroyer; The Troll Hunter
- Weight: Welterweight; Light-welterweight; Lightweight heavyweight

Boxing career
- Stance: Orthodox

Boxing record
- Total fights: 31
- Wins: 24
- Win by KO: 13
- Losses: 7
- Draws: 0
- No contests: 0

Curtis Woodhouse BEM (born 17 April 1980) is an English former professional footballer turned professional boxer and football manager, most recently in charge of Marske United. Woodhouse played football as a central midfielder, and competed as a light-welterweight boxer. He is the former British light-welterweight champion. His career in the Football League spanned across nine seasons, earning four caps for the England under-21 football team. Woodhouse's professional boxing record stands at 29 fights 22 wins, 13 of which are by knock-out, and 7 defeats.

He started his footballing career with York City's centre of excellence before joining Sheffield United. In November 2001, he was transferred to Birmingham City for a fee of £1 million, before joining Rotherham United in January 2003, on loan for five months. He then joined Peterborough United on a free transfer in October 2003. In May 2005, he joined Hull City for £25,000, before joining Grimsby Town just eight months later in January 2006. He retired at the end of the 2006–07 season.

Woodhouse stated that he had "fallen out of love" with football and decided to turn to professional boxing, despite no previous experience. In September 2006, he won his first professional boxing match, defeating Dean Marcantonio, on points, knocking him down twice in the final round.

He was convicted of assaulting a police officer and of using threatening, abusive or insulting words or behaviour in April 2006. As a result, he had his boxing licence suspended for five months by the British Boxing Board of Control, despite the incident happening before he was under the BBBofC's jurisdiction. Woodhouse returned to football in November 2006, joining Rushden & Diamonds in the Conference National before moving to Mansfield Town in January 2009. After leaving them, he moved to Harrogate Town. At the end of February 2010, he joined Sheffield in the Northern Premier League. Before the start of the 2011–12 football season, he moved up two divisions in the football league system when he joined Conference North outfit Eastwood Town.

== Career ==
=== York City and Sheffield United ===
Woodhouse began his football career at York City's centre of excellence in 1994, before being transferred to Sheffield United for an initial compensation fee of £2,200. Sheffield United and York City later agreed on an additional £15,000 fee plus a five-percentage sell-on clause. He made his debut for Sheffield United at the age of 17, coming on as a 79th-minute substitute in a 1–0 home win against Crewe Alexandra in the First Division on 29 November 1997. He made a total of nine First Division appearances in the 1997–98 season. He holds the record for being the club's youngest ever captain, aged 19.

Woodhouse earned a call-up to the England under-21 team, and made his debut in a 2–2 away draw against Hungary on 27 April 1999. He went on to earn another three caps against Sweden, Bulgaria and Poland in England's 2000 UEFA European Under-21 Championship qualifying group. He made a total of 104 appearances in the Football League, scoring six goals, before being sold to Birmingham City for £1 million in February 2001.

=== Birmingham City ===
He made his debut for Birmingham City on 3 February 2001, in a 2–1 home victory against Norwich City. He made 17 appearances for Birmingham during the 2000–01 season, scoring twice. Both goals came in the final league match of the season, a 2–1 away win against Huddersfield Town, sealing their relegation fate. Birmingham reached the League Cup final, however, Woodhouse was unable to play as he was cup-tied, having previously played in three League Cup games for Sheffield United that season. He was arrested after the final of the League Cup, on 25 February 2001, having been charged with affray along with two others after they "trashed" an Indian restaurant and he wielded a chair in a brawl with university students. In July 2002, he was sentenced to 120 hours of community service and ordered to pay £250 costs. Birmingham finished fifth in the First Division, and reached the play-offs, losing in a penalty shoot-out in the semi-final, after the game was drawn 2–2 on aggregate. Woodhouse played in both semi-final matches.

During the following season, 2001–02, Woodhouse made 28 appearances in the First Division. Birmingham reached the play-offs again for the fourth consecutive season, this time gaining promotion after beating Millwall in the semi-final and Norwich City in the final. This time, Woodhouse did not play in any of the play-off matches. He made just three appearances for Birmingham City in the Premier League, before being loaned out to Rotherham United in January 2003. Grimsby Town and Brighton & Hove Albion were also reportedly interested in signing the midfielder. During his loan spell at Rotherham, he turned out 11 times in the First Division.

=== Peterborough United ===
Woodhouse signed for Peterborough United on 14 October 2003, the same day that he made his debut against Torquay United in a 3–2 victory in the Football League Trophy. However, he had been training with Peterborough a month prior to signing for them, whilst he "sorted out some problems at Birmingham City". He went on to captain the side, and was later described as "Captain Marvel" by manager, Barry Fry. In 2003–04, he made 27 appearances in the Second Division, scoring seven goals. Peterborough finished 18th in the Second Division, two points from relegation, with Woodhouse being named as Peterborough's player of the season. In May 2004, Hull City manager, Peter Taylor, made a failed £100,000 bid to try and sign the midfielder. The following season, 2004–05, he made 34 appearances in the newly named League One and scored four goals. Peterborough suffered relegation, after finishing 23rd in the league.

=== Hull City ===
He joined Hull City in May 2005, the club he supported as a child, on a two-year contract for a fee of £25,000, with the potential to rise to £150,000 depending on appearances. His debut for Hull was as a late substitute in a 2–0 victory against Brighton & Hove Albion on 20 August 2005. Though he lacked fitness at the start of the season, injuries to Keith Andrews and Ian Ashbee gave him the chance of a regular starting place, and manager Taylor also handed him the team captaincy. Despite consistent performances, by December 2005 he had lost his place and there was speculation that he had fallen out with Taylor and wanted to leave; this was strongly denied by the player: "I'm shocked that people are saying I want to go. I'm very happy here. ... It's taken me long enough to get to Hull so I'm not going to walk out after a few months, or whatever." In the following six weeks he made only two brief substitute appearances – in five months with the club he played 18 games in the Championship without scoring – and the strength of Hull's squad was such that he could not be guaranteed regular first-team football.

=== Grimsby Town ===
In the January 2006 transfer window, he joined Grimsby Town on a two-year deal, three years after they first expressed an interest in signing him. He made his debut against former club Peterborough United in League Two, on 28 January 2006 in a 2–1 home defeat, and scored his first and what turned out to be only goal for the club against Mansfield on 14 February 2006. On 26 April 2006, Woodhouse said he planned to retire from football at the end of the 2005–06 season and embark on a career as a professional boxer. He made 16 appearances in League Two, helping them to finish fourth place, reaching the play-offs. Woodhouse played in both of Grimsby's play-off semi-final victories over Lincoln City, setting up the only goal of the game in the first leg. He played his last Football League game in the play-off final at the Millennium Stadium on 28 May 2006. Grimsby were defeated 1–0 in the final by Cheltenham Town. Woodhouse gave away a penalty in the 70th minute that was saved by goalkeeper Steve Mildenhall.

=== Switch to boxing ===
Woodhouse had a history of theft, robbery and affray, and said that he had "fallen out of love" with football. He admitted to have been involved in around 100 street fights. He said; "Boxing has always been my first love, even as a kid", and "I love fighting...Rather than get locked up for it, I might as well get paid for it." He also stated that he used to spar in the boxing gym after football training without his manager's knowledge, saying "A few times at Sheffield United, Neil Warnock would drag me in and say 'I hear you've been boxing'. I'd be standing there with a big black eye and a fat lip and deny it." He trained under former British featherweight champion, Gary De Roux, and made his boxing debut on 8 September 2006 at Grosvenor House Hotel, London, in a welterweight contest against Dean Marcantonio, despite not having any previous amateur experience. The former footballer had lost two stone in weight since his playing days with Grimsby Town. The fight was scheduled for four rounds of two minutes, Woodhouse knocked his opponent down twice in the final round and won on points.

=== Return to football part-time ===
After only one professional fight, Woodhouse returned to football in November 2006, signing for Rushden & Diamonds, who were playing in the Conference National, the highest-tier of non-league football. His boxing licence was suspended by the British Boxing Board of Control, following a conviction for assaulting a police officer whilst drunk and of using threatening, abusive or insulting words or behaviour in April 2006, when he was still playing for Grimsby Town, and not under the BBBofC's jurisdiction at the time of the incident. He was ordered to pay £100 compensation to PC Andrew Whitehead and £350 in costs. Woodhouse chose to play for Rushden & Diamonds to fulfil a promise he made to someone who was part of the consortium that took over the Irthlingborough based club. He made his debut against Aldershot Town on 25 November 2006, in a 1–0 defeat. He made five appearances in the Conference National for Rushden, before deciding to leave to concentrate on his boxing career.

He then returned to Rushden on 1 March 2007, and made a further 11 appearances in the Conference in the 2006–07 season, scoring three goals, including a 30-yard long range effort against Northwich Victoria on 23 April. After five months away from boxing, Woodhouse returned to the ring for his second fight on 15 April, defeating Duncan Cottier on points after four rounds. On 1 May, he signed a new two-year deal with Rushden & Diamonds. He then defeated Peter Dunn in a bout on 3 June, again on points, in a contest of four three-minute rounds. In his fourth fight on 5 December 2007, he defeated Craig Tomes by way of knock-out after just 1 minute and 57 seconds, landing a left hook that unsettled Tomes as the referee decided his opponent as unfit to continue. Matt Seawright was Woodhouse's next boxing opponent on 16 March 2008, he defeated him after Seawright felt he was unable to continue after the third round. Woodhouse finished the 2007–08 football season having played in 29 Conference National matches, scoring once and receiving two red cards. On 17 May, Woodhouse achieved his sixth straight victory, maintaining his undefeated record against Dave Murray at Bramall Lane, defeating his opponent by knock-out in the second round. Murray managed to beat the standing eight count, but the referee deemed him unable to continue after 1 minute and 23 seconds.

After defeating Wayne Downing in 57 seconds on 21 June 2008, Woodhouse stated his intention to retire from football at the end of the 2008–09 season, to concentrate on his boxing career. He was later appointed as team captain for his final season at the club. Woodhouse scored a decisive penalty in Rushden's opening game of the 2008–09 season, away on 9 August, against newly promoted Eastbourne Borough. He was sent off again in the home game against Histon on 25 August, after receiving two yellow cards. In his eighth boxing match, Woodhouse defeated Jimmy Beech on points on 20 September. He then proceeded to defeat Peter Dunn on 30 November, stopping him 23 seconds in the sixth and final round at Thurcroft's Consort Hotel, Rotherham.

He signed for Mansfield Town on 5 January on a contract until the end of the 2008–09 season. Woodhouse made his debut for Mansfield Town on 24 January in a Conference National match against Lewes. Mansfield won 1–0. Matt Scriven was Woodhouse's next opponent in the ring on 29 March at Bramall Lane. The fight went the distance of six rounds and Woodhouse was given the decision over Scriven. His first professional loss as a boxer was on 25 April at Ulster Hall, in Belfast at the hands of Jay Morris. The fight went the distance, but Woodhouse lost 37–36 on points over six rounds. Mansfield manager David Holdsworth hoped Woodhouse would stay at the club, but on 18 June, he joined Conference North team Harrogate Town. On 27 November, he defeated Dean Hickman by TKO in round 6. This was Woodhouse's first fight in the light-welterweight division, having dropped down from welterweight.

On 13 January 2010, in an interview to the Grimsby Telegraph, Woodhouse commented he would definitely consider a move back to former club Grimsby Town after expressing his dismay at The Mariners languishing near the bottom of the League Two, within danger of being relegated from the Football League. He commented "If they are looking for a central midfielder, though, they are welcome to give me a call". Harrogate released him by mutual consent on 25 February. Three days later he avenged his defeat by Jay Morris by beating him with a TKO in round 3. This gave Woodhouse the first title of his boxing career, the International Masters light-welterweight title. On 25 April, Woodhouse defended the title with a 4th-round knockout of Maurycy Gojko, who stepped in as a late replacement for Steve Saville. Next, on 2 July, Woodhouse knocked out veteran Stefy Bull in round 9. His next fight was due to be against 2006 Commonwealth Games gold medallist and former world amateur champion Frankie Gavin on 18 September, but Woodhouse pulled out days after the bout was announced in July. He moved up the non-League football ladder in June 2011, after signing for Conference North side Eastwood Town.

== Managerial career ==
It was announced on 2 May 2012, that Woodhouse was the new manager of Northern Premier League Division One South club Sheffield. He also made one cup appearance for the club as a substitute, adding to the 14 appearances he had made in all competitions during his first spell. Woodhouse resigned in December 2012 after admitting having difficulty to managing a football team as well as being a professional boxer.

On 14 October 2013, Woodhouse was announced as the assistant manager at Northern Premier League Division One South club Goole, with former teammate David Holdsworth being appointed manager. In January 2014 Woodhouse replaced Holdsworth as manager following Holdsworth's resignation. Woodhouse then left Goole after some issues with the board, and took over at Hull United in January 2015. On 29 September 2016 Woodhouse was appointed as manager at Bridlington Town.

On 2 June 2019, Woodhouse was appointed manager of Tadcaster Albion. In October 2019 he left Tadcaster to join Gainsborough Trinity as manager. On 26 February 2021, Woodhouse parted from Gainsborough Trinity by mutual consent.

On 2 November 2022, Woodhouse was appointed manager of Marske United. On 23 February 2023, Marske United parted company with Woodhouse after three wins from thirteen matches.

== Personal life ==
Woodhouse was born in Beverley and raised in Driffield. His father, Bernard Woodhouse, died at the age of 51 after he had a fatal stroke. Unlike other boys who idolised footballers, Woodhouse stated his heroes were Nigel Benn and Mike Tyson. He admits to fighting at school and in the streets after being racially abused: "I went from scrapping in the street and at school to fighting in the boxing ring from the age of 12. I was called a few names due to the colour of my skin, but with a quick smack in the mouth they soon backed off." He used to visit Boothferry Park to support Hull City before pursuing his career in professional football. He and his wife, Charlotte, have three children: two sons, Kyle and Caleb, and a daughter, Isla. He published an autobiography, Box to Box: From the Premier League to British Boxing Champion, in 2016.

He was awarded the British Empire Medal in the 2021 New Year Honours.

== Career statistics ==
=== Club ===
Appearances and goals by club, season and competition
Club	Season	League			FA Cup		League Cup		Other		Total	
Club	Season	Division	Apps	Goals	Apps	Goals	Apps	Goals	Apps	Goals	Apps	Goals
Sheffield United	1997–98	Division One	9	0	1	0	0	0	0	0	10	0
Sheffield United	1998–99	Division One	33	3	5	0	3	0	—		41	3
Sheffield United	1999–2000	Division One	37	3	3	0	2	0	—		42	3
Sheffield United	2000–01	Division One	25	0	1	0	3	0	—		29	0
Sheffield United	Total		104	6	10	0	8	0	0	0	122	6
Birmingham City	2000–01	Division One	17	2	0	0	0	0	2 (Note: Appearance(s) in Division One play-offs)	0	19	2
Birmingham City	2001–02	Division One	28	0	1	0	3	0	0	0	32	0
Birmingham City	2002–03	Premier League	3	0	0	0	1	0	—		4	0
Birmingham City	Total		48	2	1	0	4	0	2	0	55	2
Rotherham United (loan)	2002–03	Division One	11	0	0	0	0	0	—		11	0
Peterborough United	2003–04	Division Two	27	7	3	0	0	0	3 (Note: Appearance(s) in Football League Trophy)	0	33	7
Peterborough United	2004–05	League One	34	4	3	1	1	0	1	0	39	5
Peterborough United	Total		61	11	6	1	1	0	4	0	72	12
Hull City	2005–06	Championship	18	0	0	0	1	0	—		19	0
Grimsby Town	2005–06	League Two	16	1	0	0	0	0	3 (Note: Appearance(s) in League Two play-offs)	0	19	1
Rushden & Diamonds	2006–07	Conference National	16	4	1	0	—		1 (Note: Appearance(s) in FA Trophy)	1	18	5
Rushden & Diamonds	2007–08	Conference Premier	29	1	1	0	—		11 (Note: Three appearances in FA Trophy; five appearances in Conference League Cup; two appearances one goal in Northamptonshire Senior Cup; one appearance in Northamptonshire Cup)	1	41	2
Rushden & Diamonds	2008–09	Conference Premier	20	1	1	0	—		3 (Note: Two appearances in FA Trophy; one appearance in Conference League Cup)	0	24	1
Rushden & Diamonds	Total		65	6	3	0	—		15	2	83	8
Mansfield Town	2008–09	Conference Premier	12	0	0	0	—		0	0	12	0
Career total			335	26	20	1	14	0	24	2	393	29

=== International ===
England U21 national team
Year	Apps	Goals
1999	4	0
Total	4	0

== Professional boxing record ==
24 Wins (13 knockouts, 11 decisions) 7 Loss (2 knockouts, 5 decisions), 0 Draws
Res.	Record	Opponent	Type	Rd, Time	Date	Venue	Location	Notes
Won	24-7	(United Kingdom) Lewis van Poetsch	PTS	6 (6)	25 November 2017	Doncaster Dome	Doncaster, England	
Won	23-7	(Lithuania) Arvydas Trizno	PTS	6 (6)	2 September 2017	Doncaster Dome	Doncaster, England	
Lost	22-7	(United Kingdom) Willie Limond	PTS	12 (12)	27 June 2014	Braehead Arena	Glasgow, Scotland	For Commonwealth Light-Welterweight title and lost British light-welterweight title
Won	22-6	(United Kingdom) Darren Hamilton	SD	12 (12)	22 February 2014	Hull Arena	Hull, England	Woodhouse wins British light-welterweight title on split decision and retires from professional boxing
Won	21-6	(Poland) Arek Malek	PTS	6 (6)	13 December 2013	Ice Sheffield	Sheffield, England	
Won	20-6	(United Kingdom) Lewis van Poetsch	PTS	6 (6)	2 November 2013	Hull Arena	Hull, England	Woodhouse cut above the left eye in the 2nd round. van Poetsch down in the 5th
Lost	19-6	(United Kingdom) Derry Mathews	KO	4 (12)	21 September 2013	Liverpool Olympia	Liverpool, England	For Commonwealth Lightweight title
Won	19-5	(Morocco) Joe Elfidh	TKO	3 (8)	13 July 2013	Craven Park	Hull, England	Elfidh down in rounds one and two
Won	18-5	(Hungary) Sandor horvath	TKO	1 (10)	17 May 2013	Ponds Forge	Sheffield, England	
Lost	17-5	(United Kingdom) Shayne Singleton	MD	10 (10)	8 February 2013	Bowler's Arena	Manchester, England	Woodhouse loses English light-welterweight title
Won	17-4	(United Kingdom) Dave Ryan	MD	10 (10)	28 September 2012	Magna Centre	Rotherham, England	Woodhouse wins vacant English light-welterweight title on majority decision. Ryan down in the 3rd.
Lost	16-4	(United Kingdom) Dale Miles	TKO	5 (10), 2:26	6 June 2012	Magna Centre	Rotherham, England	British light-welterweight title eliminator. Miles cut on the left eyebrow in the 1st round (head clash). Woodhouse down in the 5th.
Won	16-3	(United Kingdom) Gary McArthur	RTD	4 (10), 3:00	26 November 2011	Magna Centre	Rotherham, England	McArthur retires with a hand injury.
Lost	15-3	(United Kingdom) Frankie Gavin	SD	12 (12)	16 July 2011	Echo Arena	Liverpool, England	WBO Intercontinental welterweight title.
Won	15-2	(United Kingdom) Billy Smith	KO	3 (4), 1:24	10 April 2011	Magna Centre	Rotherham, England	Smith down from a body shot.
Lost	14-2	(United Kingdom) Peter McDonagh	PTS	8 (8)	23 October 2010	York Hall	Bethnal Green, England	
Won	14-1	(United Kingdom) Stefy Bull	TKO	9 (10), 2:15	2 July 2010	Doncaster Dome	Doncaster, England	
Won	13-1	(Poland) Maurycy Gojko	KO	4 (10), 2:01	25 April 2010	Magna Centre	Rotherham, England	International Masters light-welterweight title. Gojko came in at 48 hours notice after Steve Saville withdrew.
Won	12-1	(United Kingdom) Jay Morris	TKO	3 (10), 0:39	28 February 2010	Magna Centre	Rotherham, England	Vacant International Masters light-welterweight title. Morris down in the 3rd from a right to the head.
Won	11-1	(United Kingdom) Dean Hickman	TKO	6 (8), 2:15	27 November 2009	Gemtec Arena	Hull, England	
Lost	10-1	(United Kingdom) Jay Morris	PTS	6 (6)	25 April 2009	Ulster Hall	Belfast, Northern Ireland	First professional defeat.
Won	10-0	(United Kingdom) Matt Scriven	PTS	6 (6)	29 March 2009	Bramall Lane	Sheffield, England	Scriven down in the 1st.
Won	9-0	(United Kingdom) Peter Dunn	TKO	6 (6), 0:20	1 December 2008	Thurcroft Consort Hotel	Rotherham, England	
Won	8-0	(United Kingdom) Jimmy Beech	PTS	6 (6)	20 September 2008	Hillsborough Leisure Centre	Sheffield, England	
Won	7-0	(United Kingdom) Wayne Downing	KO	1 (6), 0:57	17 May 2008	National Indoor Arena	Birmingham, England	
Won	6-0	(United Kingdom) Dave Murray	TKO	1 (4), 1:13	16 March 2008	Bramall Lane	Sheffield, England	
Won	5-0	(United Kingdom) Matt Seawright	TKO	3 (6)	5 December 2007	Sheffield United Academy	Sheffield, England	Seawright retired in his corner.
Won	4-0	(United Kingdom) Craig Tomes	TKO	1 (6), 1:27	14 July 2007	Don Valley Stadium	Sheffield, England	
Won	3-0	(United Kingdom) Peter Dunn	PTS	4 (4)	3 June 2007	Metrodome Leisure Complex	Barnsley, England	
Won	2-0	(United Kingdom) Duncan Cottier	PTS	4 (4)	15 April 2007	Metrodome Leisure Complex	Barnsley, England	
Won	1-0	(United Kingdom) Dean Marcantonio	PTS	4 (4)	8 September 2006	Grosvenor House Hotel	London, England	Professional debut.
