= Chris Jenkins (boxer) =

Welsh boxer (born 1988)

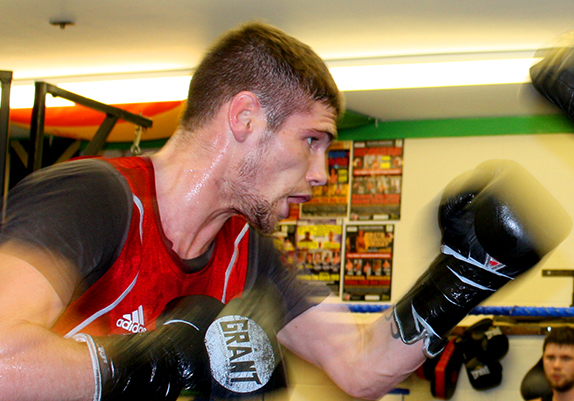

Personal information
- Nickname: Rok'n'Rolla
- Nationality: Welsh
- Born: 14 August 1988 (age 38) Swansea, Wales
- Height: 5 ft 9 in (1.75 m)
- Weight: Light welterweight; Welterweight

Boxing career
- Stance: Orthodox

Boxing record
- Total fights: 33
- Wins: 23
- Win by KO: 8
- Losses: 7
- Draws: 3

Chris Jenkins (born 14 August 1988) is a Welsh professional boxer who held the British and Commonwealth welterweight titles between 2019 and 2021.

== Amateur career ==
Jenkins represented Wales at the 2007 World Amateur Boxing Championships in Chicago. He did so again at the 2011 World Amateur Boxing Championships in Baku, Azerbaijan. He also won a gold medal at the 2007 Four Nations Cup in Ontario and three Welsh senior titles.

== Professional career ==
Chris Jenkins turned professional in 2012, signing with Neath based boxing manager/promoter Paul Boyce. He is currently being trained by Ronnie Morris and Jimmy Broomfield at the Cwmgors Boxing Club. His first professional fight took place at the Oceana Nightclub, Swansea, against Aberystwyth based fighter Russell Pearce. Chris won by a technical knockout in second round

The Prizefighter competition was broadcast live on Sky Sports from York Hall, Bethnal Green on 6 July 2013. To win the competition Jenkins, fighting for the first time outside Wales as a professional, beat Tony Owen and Eren Arif both on points decisions in the early stages. He then defeated Southern Area champion Danny Conner in a-round-and-a-half to claim the Prizefighter trophy and a cheque for £34,000 (£32,000 for the win and an extra £2,000 for stopping his opponent).

On 7 September 2013 Jenkins fought the Frenchman Laurent Ferra on the Ricky Burns bill in Glasgow. The fight went the full distance with Chris winning on points (60–55 on the scorecard). Ferra proved to be a tough and durable opponent in a hard and competitive fight, though outmatched his opponent in skill and speed. He cut Jenkins above the left eye with a headbutt, which was kept closed by cut-man Jimmy Broomfield and did not noticeably affect his performance.

On 1 February 2014, Chris, in what was only his thirteenth fight as a professional, won the WBC International belt at the Motorpoint Arena, Cardiff. He featured on the undercard of the Matchroom Sports 'Reloaded' show. Chris beat the former French Champion Christopher Serbire convincingly on points over ten rounds. This fight marked a step up for Chris as he had only boxed up to six rounds previously.

On the undercard of the 'Welsh Pride' show, which took place on 21 March 2014 at the Merthyr Leisure Centre, Chris dispatched of Bulgaria's Asan Yuseinov in just half a round. A stinging left to the body caused Yuseinov to collapse to the canvas and he couldn't beat the referee's count.

On 17 May 2014 at Cardiff's Motorpoint Arena, Chris defeated the cagey Nicaraguan fighter (based in Barcelona, Spain) Miguel Aguilar on points, over six rounds. Chris won every round convincingly. The fight featured on the Matchroom's 'The Second Coming' bill, which included the return to the ring of Nathan Cleverly and an official eliminator for the WBC featherweight title for Lee Selby.

Jacek Wylezol from Poland was his next opponent. The bout took place at the Rhydycar Leisure Centre in Merthyr Tydfil on 24 October 2014. Jenkins quickly dispatched of Wylezol in one round with a ferocious body shot.

After the original fight had to be reschedule from 23 January 2014 in Manchester (due to the cancellation of the main event, Anthony Crolla v Richar Abril), Jenkins is now due to fight the Scottish veteran Willie Limond for his British title. The fight will take place on 28 March 2015 in Sheffield. Chris Jenkins became British Champion of the welterweight division on the 8 of March 2019 upsetting the odds and defeating Johnny Garton in the Royal Albert Hall.

=== Record ===
32 fights	23 wins	6 losses
By knockout	8	2
By decision	15	4
Draws	3	

No.	Result	Record	Opponent	Type	Round, time	Date	Location	Notes
32	Loss	23–6–3	Tyrone McKenna	UD	10	6 Aug 2022	SSE Arena, Belfast, Belfast, Northern Ireland	
31	Loss	23–5–3	Florian Marku	TKO	4 (10), 1:41	2 Apr 2022	Vertu Motors Arena, Newcastle, England	For IBF International welterweight title
30	Win	23–4–3	Julius Indongo	PTS	8	5 Feb 2022	Motorpoint Arena, Cardiff, Wales	
29	Loss	22–4–3	Ekow Essuman	TKO	8 (12), 0:43	24 Jul 2021	The SSE Arena, London, England	Lost British and Commonwealth welterweight titles
28	Draw	22–3–3	Liam Taylor	TD	4 (12), 2:56	30 Nov 2019	Arena Birmingham, Birmingham, England	Retained British welterweight title; Technical decision draw after Jenkins was cut from an accidental head clash
27	Win	22–3–2	Paddy Gallagher	TD	9 (12), 1:42	3 Aug 2019	Marquee, Belfast, Northern Ireland	Retained British welterweight title; Won vacant Commonwealth welterweight title; Unanimous TD after Jenkins was cut from an accidental head clash
26	Win	21–3–2	Johnny Garton	UD	12	8 Mar 2019	Royal Albert Hall, London, England	Won British welterweight title
25	Win	20–3–2	Edvinas Puplauskas	PTS	6	2 Feb 2019	The NEON, Newport, Wales	
24	Draw	19–3–2	Darragh Foley	TD	3 (10), 3:00	24 Aug 2018	Emirates Arena, Glasgow, Scotland	For WBA Oceania super lightweight title; Fight stopped after Jenkins was cut from an accidental head clash
23	Loss	19–3–1	Akeem Ennis-Brown	TD	5 (10), 1:29	12 May 2018	GL1 Leisure Centre, Gloucester, England	For vacant WBC Youth super lightweight title; Unanimous TD after Jenkins was cut from an accidental head clash
22	Win	19–2–1	Arvydas Trizno	PTS	6	22 Dec 2017	Active Living Centre, Pontypool, Wales	
21	Win	18–2–1	Rudolf Durica	PTS	4	30 Sep 2017	Skylark Hotel, Essex, England	
20	Win	17–2–1	Chris Adaway	PTS	6	13 May 2017	Brangwyn Hall, Swansea, Wales	
19	Loss	16–2–1	Philip Sutcliffe, Jr.	PTS	10	5 Nov 2016	Titanic Exhibition Centre, Belfast, Northern Ireland	
18	Loss	16–1–1	Tyrone Nurse	UD	12	21 Nov 2015	Manchester Arena, Manchester, England	For vacant British super lightweight title
17	Draw	16–0–1	Tyrone Nurse	MD	12	18 Jul 2015	Manchester Arena, Manchester, England	For vacant British super lightweight title
16	Win	16–0	Jacek Wylezol	TKO	1 (6), 2:10	24 Oct 2014	Rhydycar Leisure Centre, Merthyr Tydfil, Wales	
15	Win	15–0	Miguel Aguilar	TKO	7 (8)	17 May 2014	Motorpoint Arena, Cardiff, Wales	
14	Win	14–0	Asan Yuseinov	KO	1 (8), 1:46	21 Mar 2014	Rhydycar Leisure Centre, Merthyr Tydfil, Wales	
13	Win	13–0	Christopher Sebire	UD	10	1 Feb 2014	Motorpoint Arena, Cardiff, Wales	Won vacant WBC International super lightweight title
12	Win	12–0	Mark McKray	PTS	6	29 Nov 2013	Oceana, Swansea, Wales	
11	Win	11–0	Laurent Ferra	PTS	6	7 Sep 2013	Scottish Exhibition Centre, Glasgow, Scotland	
10	Win	10–0	Cassius Connor	KO	2 (3), 0:40	6 Jul 2013	York Hall, London, England	Prizefighter: The Light Welterweights - Final
9	Win	9–0	Eren Arif	UD	3	6 Jul 2013	York Hall, London, England	Prizefighter: The Light Welterweights III - Semi-final
8	Win	8–0	Tony Owen	UD	3	6 Jul 2013	York Hall, London, England	Prizefighter: The Light Welterweights III - Quarter-final
7	Win	7–0	Arek Malek	PTS	6	25 May 2013	Neath Sports Centre, Neath, Wales	
6	Win	6–0	Matthew Ashmole	PTS	4	4 May 2013	Rhondda Fach Sports Centre, Tylorstown, Wales	
5	Win	5–0	Dave O'Connor	TKO	2 (4), 0:38	2 Mar 2013	Oceana, Swansea, Wales	
4	Win	4–0	Stanislavs Leonovs	KO	1 (4), 3:06	23 Nov 2012	Oceana, Swansea, Wales	
3	Win	3–0	Arturas Zbarauskas	TKO	1 (4), 0:46	14 Sep 2012	Oceana, Swansea, Wales	
2	Win	2–0	Billy Smith	PTS	4	16 Jun 2012	Neath Sports Centre, Neath, Wales	
1	Win	1–0	Russell Pearce	TKO	2 (4), 2:36	17 Feb 2012	Oceana, Swansea, Wales	
