= Youssouf Djibaba =

French boxer

Personal information
- Nationality: French
- Born: 4 October 1976 (age 49) Marseille, France
- Weight: Super featherweight Lightweight

Boxing career
- Stance: Orthodox

Boxing record
- Total fights: 30
- Wins: 15
- Win by KO: 3
- Losses: 13
- Draws: 2

Youssouf Djibaba (born 4 October 1976) is a French former professional boxer who competed from 1998 to 2007.

== Professional career ==
On 25 February 2006, Djibaba fought Kevin Mitchell for the IBF Inter-Continental Super Featherweight title, but lost by twelfth-round unanimous decision.

Djibaba lost to Vitali Tajbert on 7 December 2007 by tenth-round knockout. Following the loss, Djibaba retired from boxing.

== Professional boxing record ==
15 Wins (3 knockouts, 12 decisions), 13 Losses, 2 Draws
Res.	Record	Opponent	Type	Round, Time	Date	Location	Notes
Loss	15–13–2	(Germany) Vitali Tajbert	TKO	10 (10), 2:51	2007-12-07	Sporthalle, Alsterdorf, Germany	
Loss	15–12–2	(France) Mohammed Medjadji	UD	10	2007-05-12	Espace Charles Trenet, Salon-de-Provence, France	For France super featherweight title.
Loss	15–11–2	(France) Karim Chakim	PTS	8	2007-02-23	Salle Jean Roure, Les Pennes-Mirabeau, France	
Loss	15–10–2	(France) Mohammed Medjadji	SD	10	2006-11-24	Salle Jean Roure, Les Pennes-Mirabeau, France	Lost France super featherweight title
Win	15–9–2	(Italy) Alessandro Di Meco	TKO	8 (12)	2006-05-26	Palasport, Grosseto, Italy	Won vacant EBU-EU super featherweight title
Loss	14–9–2	(United Kingdom) Kevin Mitchell	UD	12	2006-02-25	(United Kingdom) ExCel Arena, London, England	For IBF Inter-Continental super featherweight title
Loss	14–8–2	(Russia) Petr Petrov	PTS	8	2006-02-03	Santa Cruz de Tenerife, Spain	
Win	14–7–2	(France) Mohamed Benbiou	PTS	10	2005-11-26	Salle Cuiry, Gien, France	Retained France super featherweight title
Win	13–7–2	(Morocco) Tarik Sahibeddine	PTS	10	2005-03-25	Salle Jean Roure, Les Pennes-Mirabeau, France	Retained France super featherweight title
Win	12–7–2	(France) Ali Oubaali	UD	10	2004-11-19	Palais des Sports, Marseille, France	Retained France super featherweight title
Loss	11–7–2	(United Kingdom) Willie Limond	UD	10	2004-06-19	(United Kingdom) Braehead Arena, Glasgow, Scotland	For vacant EBU-EU super featherweight title
Win	11–6–2	(France) Bouziane Oudji	PTS	10	2004-04-03	Pont-Sainte-Maxence, France	Retained France super featherweight title
Win	10–6–2	(Benin) Adolphe Avadja	PTS	10	2003-10-10	Palais des Sports, Marseille, France	Retained France super featherweight title
Win	9–6–2	(France) Bouziane Oudji	PTS	10	2003-05-30	Pont-Sainte-Maxence, France	Retained France super featherweight title
Loss	8–6–2	(Algeria) Affif Djelti	TKO	8 (12)	2003-04-15	Palazzo Dello Sport, Piacenza, Italy	For vacant European super featherweight title
Win	8–5–2	(Benin) Adolphe Avadja	UD	10	2002-11-29	Les Pennes-Mirabeau, France	Won vacant France super featherweight title
Loss	7–5–2	(Poland) Matt Zegan	UD	10	2002-04-13	Bielsko-Biała, Poland	For Polish International super featherweight title
Loss	7–4–2	(France) Bouziane Oudji	PTS	10	2001-12-15	Amiens, France	Lost France super featherweight title
Win	7–3–2	(France) Nasser Lakrib	TKO	9 (10)	2001-08-04	Plages du Prado, Marseille, France	Won vacant France super featherweight title
Loss	6–3–2	(France) Nasser Lakrib	PTS	10	2001-04-01	La Palestre, Le Cannet, France	For France super featherweight title
Draw	6–2–2	(Morocco) Abdelilah Touil	PTS	8	2001-01-19	La Seyne-sur-Mer, France	
Loss	6–2–1	(France) Nasser Lakrib	PTS	8	2000-05-25	Élancourt, France	
Loss	6–1–1	(Algeria) Mehdi Labdouni	KO	9 (10)	2000-03-31	Fontenay-sous-Bois, France	For France super featherweight title
Win	6–0–1	(Ivory Coast) Kimoun Kouassi	KO	3 (8)	2000-02-11	Béziers, France	
Win	5–0–1	(France) Frederic Bonifai	PTS	6	1999-11-12	Salle Leyrit, Nice, France	
Draw	4–0–1	(Democratic Republic of the Congo) Jean Pierre Dibateza	PTS	8	1999-07-24	Fréjus, France	
Win	4–0	(France) Didier Tual	PTS	8	1999-04-02	Hyères, France	
Win	3–0	(Algeria) Djamel Ayed	PTS	6	1998-06-06	Brest, France	
Win	2–0	(France) Didier Tual	PTS	6	1998-03-14	Vichy, France	
Win	1–0	(France) Johny Begue	PTS	6	1998-01-17	Otterswiller, France	
