= Ashley Theophane =

English boxer

Personal information
- Nickname: Treasure
- Nationality: British
- Born: 30 August 1980 (age 46) Paddington, London, England
- Height: 5 ft 8 in (173 cm)
- Weight: Light-welterweight; Welterweight; Light-middleweight

Boxing career
- Reach: 67 in (170 cm)
- Stance: Orthodox

Boxing record
- Total fights: 60
- Wins: 50
- Losses: 9
- Draws: 1

Ashley Theophane (born 30 August 1980) is a British professional boxer. He held the British super-lightweight title from 2011 to 2012.

He has fought and won in 12 countries and headlined in Las Vegas. He was a five-year member of Floyd Mayweather Jr.’s Mayweather Promotions in Las Vegas. He has achieved 50 professional victories during a 17-year career.

He is now an author with his biography, Raised By The Hood, in which he tells the story of his life from the mean streets of London to the bright lights of Las Vegas.

== Professional career ==
=== Early career ===
Theophane made his professional debut at the York Hall, London on 3 June 2003, defeating Lee Bedell. He beat an experienced journeyman, Brian Coleman, in his next fight on 22 July 2003, and won a further five contests throughout 2004 giving him a record of 7–0 at the end of the year. In his first fight of 2005 on 26 March, Theophane suffered his first defeat to Judex Meema at the Empire Theatre in Hackney, losing on points over six rounds. The rest of the year had mixed results with four more wins including two contests with journeyman David Kehoe and a win each over Duncan Cottier and Jus Wallie but with another defeat, this time to Oscar Milkitas on 18 November, again on points although this time over 4 rounds.

In his first fight of 2006 and now with a record of 11–2 Theophane drew with Daniel Thorpe at the Excel Arena in London's Docklands. The rest of the year saw six more fights and six more wins including three victories fighting in Germany, the latter a win on 2 December against Omar Siala, was for the lightly regarded Global Boxing Council welterweight title at the IFCO Arena in Berlin. At the end of the year Theophane's record stood at 17-2-1 and on the verge of a challenge for the British title.

=== Boxing abroad ===
On 20 January 2007 Theophane defeated Alan Bosworth in a British title eliminator at the Alexandra Palace in Wood Green, stopping him in the 7th round. The title opportunity was not to come however and Theophane traveled to Saint Lucia for his next fight, a win over Marcos Hernandez on 16 November, 10 months after his last contest with Bosworth. He finished the year with a return to the York Hall and a win over journeyman Rocky Muscas on 1 December.

On 15 February 2008 Theophane traveled to Connecticut in the United States and fought his toughest opponent to date, the Frenchman Ali Oubaali. Despite having Oubaali down in the 6th round, Theophane suffered his third defeat on points over 10 rounds to a man who had previously contested both the French national title and the full European title at super featherweight. He returned to the York Hall on 15 June 2008 and returned to winning ways with a win over Geoffrey Munika, and then headed back to the US for what would prove to be a biggest win of his career so far. The fight in Rochester, New York on 31 July 2008 pitched Theophane against experienced former world champion DeMarcus Corley and ended in an 8-round decision win for the Londoner. Despite the victory, the year ended with Theophane once again fighting at the York Hall and beating journeyman Matt Scriven on 6 December, finishing the year with a record of 23–3–1.

Theophane's first fight of 2009 saw him beat former Commonwealth champion and European title challenger Craig Docherty at the York Hall and this was followed up on 21 June with a win over rookie Mark Douglas for what would be his only fights of the year. On 26 February 2010 he returned to the states and fought the undefeated Danny Garcia at the Don Haskins Convention Centre in El Paso, Texas. The fight ended with a fourth career defeat for Theophane, and with Garcia extending his winning record to 16-0 although only by a split decision.

On 19 June 2010 Theophane returned to Germany and to winning ways, picking up a title for good measure; The fight in Burghausen represented a first contest of 12 rounds for Theophane and returned a majority decision for the Londoner against Harasch Hotaki from Afghanistan for the IBO international welterweight title. Theophane followed the victory up on 30 July 2010 with another fight in the States, this time in Oklahoma, and defeated the Dominican Republic's USBA welterweight title holder and former IBF world title challenger Delvin Rodriguez for another majority decision this time over 10 rounds. On 10 October 2010 Theophane returned to England and scored a points victory over Willie Thompson in a show at the York Hall winning 60–55 in a six-round contest.

Theophane won the lightly regarded GBC world welterweight title on 28 December 2012 in Luxembourg for the second time.

=== British champion ===
On 19 February 2011, Theophane won the British title at London's Wembley Arena. His opponent, the reigning champion Lenny Daws, was making the third defence of the belt. Despite a slow start, Theophane came on strongly in the second half of the fight and knocked Daws down twice in the 9th round, eventually winning 115–111, 115–111 and 115–112 on the judges' scorecards. Prior to the fight with Daws, Theophane told how he had spent his time training between New York and London and sparring the likes of Dmitry Salita, Steve Williams and Liam Walsh. Speaking of his confidence in terms of winning the fight, Theophane said "I feel like I am dropping down a couple of levels to face Daws but his team bombarded me and my management with emails when I was in America trying to organise this fight, so let's get it on!".

On 23 July 2011 Theophane made the first defence of his title, beating Jason Cook at the Wembley Arena with a 10th round stoppage. Following the fight, Theophane signed a three-year promotional deal with Hatton Promotions with Ricky Hatton describing him as a "world class boxer". Theophane's second defence should have been against Nigel Wright in Peterlee but a late notice pull out resulted in a change of opponent with only two days notice with Ben Murphy stepping in. The fight took place on 10 December 2011, with Theophane suffering a gruelling opening assault only to break Murphy down in the later rounds to win with an 11th round stoppage.

=== Training abroad ===
Theophane has been training abroad since August 2005. He trained at Gleason's gym in Brooklyn which is the oldest gym in America. Theophane has sparred world champions Joan Guzman, Alex O'Shea, Elio Rojas, Yuri Foreman, Paul Malignaggi, and Argenis Mendez at Gleason's. For his big fights, except his fight against former world champion DeMarcus Corley, he has had a training camp at Gleason's gym.

=== Mayweather Promotions ===
Theophane trained alongside Floyd Mayweather and was taken under the wing of Mayweather Promotions.

Ashley spent 5 years signed to Mayweather Promotions. From August 2013 to May 2018. He fought on three Floyd Mayweather undercards at the MGM Grand in Las Vegas.

Ashley is amongst the few British fighters to headline in Las Vegas. December 2016 saw him achieve his 40th professional victory at the Sams Town Casino.

He trained at the Mayweather Boxing Club for three years with US Olympian Nate Jones then two years with former world champion, Lou Del Valle.

==== Broner vs. Theophane ====
On February 19, 2016, Premier Boxing Champions announced that Broner would defend his WBA light welterweight title against Theophane (39–6–1, 11 KO) on April 1 at D.C. Armory in Washington, DC live on Spike. Broner was stripped ahead of the fight, for missing the 140-pound limit. Broner defeated Theophane by TKO in the 9th round. Before the stoppage by referee Luis Pabon, Broner was leading on the scorecards 78–74, 78–74, and 77–75. After the fight, Broner called out Floyd Mayweather Jr., as tensions between the former friends had increased in the past months, due to comments about TMT (The Money Team) by Broner.

==== Theophane vs Amidu ====
His comeback fight came against Yakubu Amidu. Amidu won some rounds, but ultimately Theophane was the better man. Despite being behind on the scorecards, Amidu didn't fight with any urgency even in the last round, which Theophane clearly won, cementing the win via unanimous decision.

=== World Tour ===
Ashley parted company with Mayweather Promotions, a year early than his 3-year extended contract due to lack of fights over the two previous years.

He went on a world tour which saw him, fighting and winning in Germany, US, Hungary twice, Ghana, Poland, Mexico, Romania, Denmark and UAE from December 2017 to October 2019.

On 5 October 2019, Theophane squared off against veteran Kassim Ouma. Both fighters fought carefully, Theophane perhaps being the more cautious one. Most of the fight did not offer too much entertainment for the fans, apart from the finals rounds which were more action-packed. The fight looked close, but the judges saw it as a clear victory for Theophane, scoring it 100–91, 99–91 and 98–92 in favor of the Brit.

Theophane ended the tour after achieving 50 professional victories.

== Professional boxing record ==
Record	Res.	Opponent	Type	Round	Date	Location	Notes
50–9–1	Loss	(United Kingdom) Sam Eggington	TKO	6 (10)	2020-12-11	(United Kingdom) Fly By Nite Rehearsal Studios, Redditch, England	
50-8-1	Win	(Uganda) Kassim Ouma	UD	10	2019-10-05	Gilleleje Hallen, Gilleleje, Denmark	
49-8-1	Win	(Hungary) Ferenc Hafner	KO	4 (8)	2019-06-28	Timișoara, Romania	
48-8-1	Win	(Philippines) Jun Paderna	TKO	2 (8)	2019-05-03	(United Arab Emirates) Five Palm Jumeirah, UAE	
47-8-1	Win	(Hungary) Zsolt Friesz	KO	2 (8)	2019-03-23	Kirstacsa sports hall, Hungary	
46-8-1	Win	(Mexico) Ricardo Arce Sarmiento	TKO	3 (8)	2019-01-26	Gimnasio Independencia, Tijuana, Baja California, Mexico	
45-8-1	Win	(Azerbaijan) Bakhtiyar Isgandarzada	RTD	3 (8)	2018-12-01	PGE Turow Arena, Zgorzelec, Poland	
44-8-1	Win	(Ghana) Frank Dodzi	RTD	4 (10)	2018-09-28	Seconds Out Boxing Gymnasium, Accra, Ghana	
43-8-1	Win	(Hungary) Janos Vass	TKO	5 (8)	2018-07-08	Budapest, Hungary	
42-8-1	Win	(United States) Larry Smith	UD	8	2018-04-28	(United States) Castleton Banquet & Conference Center, Windham, New Hampshire, US	
41-8-1	Win	(Georgia (country)) Paata Varduashvili	RTD	7 (10)	2017-12-02	Müggelspreehalle, Hangelsberg, Germany	Won vacant German International Super Welterweight Title
40-8-1	Loss	(Japan) Shoki Sakai	UD	8	2017-08-22	(United States) Sam's Town Hotel & Gambling Hall, Las Vegas, US	
40-7-1	Win	(Ghana) Yakubu Amidu	UD	10	2016-12-02	(United States) Sam's Town Hotel & Gambling Hall, Las Vegas, US	
39-7-1	Loss	(United States) Adrien Broner	TKO	9 (12)	2016-04-01	(United States) D.C. Armory, Washington, D.C., US	For WBA (Regular) light welterweight title
39-6-1	Win	(United States) Steve Upsher Chambers	UD	10	2015-09-12	(United States) MGM Grand Hotel & Casino, Las Vegas, Nevada, US	
38-6-1	Win	(Mexico) Mahonri Montes	SD	10	2015-04-30	(United States) Palms Casino Resort, Las Vegas, Nevada, US	
37-6-1	Win	(Mexico) Miguel Zuniga	UD	10	2014-12-12	(United States) Alamodome, San Antonio, Texas, US	
36-6-1	Win	(United States) Daniel Calzada	UD	8	2014-08-30	(United States) Palms Casino and Resort, Pearl Theater, Las Vegas, Nevada, US	
35-6-1	Win	(United States) Angino Perez	TKO	4 (8)	2014-05-03	(United States) MGM Grand, Grand Garden Arena, Las Vegas, Nevada, US	
34-6-1	Win	(Nigeria) Robert Osiobe	SD	8 (8)	2013-12-06	(United States) Little Creek Casino Resort, Shelton, Washington, US	
33-6-1	Loss	(Mexico) Pablo César Cano	SD	10 (10)	2013-09-14	(United States) MGM Grand Hotel & Casino, Las Vegas, Nevada, US	
33-5-1	Win	(Tanzania) Chaurembo Palasa	KO	1 (12)	2012-12-28	Rene Hartmann Center, Dudelange, Luxembourg	Won vacant World Global Boxing Council Welterweight title
32-5-1	Win	(United States) Ronnie Warrior Jr	UD	8 (8)	2012-08-24	(United States) Music Factory, Charlotte, North Carolina, US	
31-5-1	Loss	(United Kingdom) Darren Hamilton	UD	12 (12)	2012-05-19	Aintree Equestrian Centre, Liverpool, Merseyside, United Kingdom	Lost British Light welterweight title
31-4-1	Win	(United Kingdom) Ben Murphy	TKO	11 (12)	2011-12-10	Peterlee Leisure Centre, Peterlee, Tyne and Wear, United Kingdom	Retained British Light welterweight title
30-4-1	Win	(United Kingdom) Jason Cook	KO	10 (12)	2011-07-23	Wembley Arena, Wembley, London, United Kingdom	Won British Light welterweight title
29-4-1	Win	(United Kingdom) Lenny Daws	UD	12 (12)	2011-02-19	Wembley Arena, Wembley, London, United Kingdom	
28-4-1	Win	(United Kingdom) Willie Thompson	PTS	6 (6)	2010-10-10	York Hall, Bethnal Green, London, United Kingdom	
27-4-1	Win	(Dominican Republic) Delvin Rodríguez	MD	10 (10)	2010-07-30	(United States) Buffalo Run Casino, Miami, Oklahoma, US	
26-4-1	Win	(Afghanistan) Harasch Hotaki	MD	12 (12)	2010-06-19	Messehalle, Burghausen, Bayern, Germany	
25-4-1	Loss	(United States) Danny Garcia	SD	10	2010-02-26	(United States) Don Haskins Convention Center, El Paso, Texas, US	
25-3-1	Win	(United Kingdom) Mark Douglas	PTS	8 (8)	2009-06-21	York Hall, Bethnal Green, London, United Kingdom	
24-3-1	Win	(United Kingdom) Craig Docherty	PTS	6 (6)	2009-03-22	York Hall, Bethnal Green, London, United Kingdom	
23-3-1	Win	(United Kingdom) Matt Scriven	PTS	6 (6)	2008-12-06	York Hall, Bethnal Green, London, United Kingdom	
22-3-1	Win	(United States) DeMarcus Corley	UD	8 (8)	2008-07-31	(United States) Frontier Field, Rochester, New York, US	
21-3-1	Win	(Kenya) Geoffrey Munika	PTS	6 (6)	2008-01-15	York Hall, Bethnal Green, London, United Kingdom	
20-3-1	Loss	(France) Ali Oubaali	UD	10 (10)	2008-02-15	(United States) Mohegan Sun Casino, Uncasville, Connecticut, US	
20-2-1	Win	(United Kingdom) Rocky Muscas	TKO	1 (6)	2007-12-01	York Hall, Bethnal Green, London, United Kingdom	
19-2-1	Win	(Dominican Republic) Marcos Hernandez	TKO	3 (8)	2007-11-16	Beausejour Cricket Ground, Gros Islet, Saint Lucia	
18-2-1	Win	(United Kingdom) Alan Bosworth	TKO	7 (10)	2007-01-20	Alexandra Palace, Wood Green, London, United Kingdom	Won British Title Eliminator
17-2-1	Win	(Germany) Omar Siala	TKO	11 (12)	2006-12-02	IFCO Arena, Koepenick, Berlin, Germany	Won vacant Global Boxing Council Welterweight title
16-2-1	Win	(Syria) Ibrahim Barakat	PTS	6 (6)	2006-10-07	Mehrzwecksporthalle, Horka, Sachsen, Germany	
15-2-1	Win	(United Kingdom) Jon Honney	PTS	6 (6)	2006-09-24	York Hall, Bethnal Green, London, United Kingdom	
14-2-1	Win	(United Kingdom) Billy Smith	PTS	4 (4)	2006-05-21	York Hall, Bethnal Green, London, United Kingdom	
13-2-1	Win	(United Kingdom) Karl Taylor	PTS	4 (4)	2006-04-01	York Hall, Bethnal Green, London, United Kingdom	
12-2-1	Win	(Czech Republic) Josef Holub	KO	3 (4)	2006-03-17	Mehrzwecksporthalle, Horka, Sachsen, Germany	
11-2-1	Draw	(United Kingdom) Daniel Thorpe	PTS	4 (4)	2006-02-25	ExCel Arena, Dockland, London, United Kingdom	
11-2	Win	(United Kingdom) Duncan Cottier	PTS	6 (6)	2005-11-19	Elephant & Castle Centre, Southwark, London, United Kingdom	
10-2	Win	(United Kingdom) David Kehoe	PTS	4 (4)	2005-10-09	Hammersmith Palace, Hammersmith, London, United Kingdom	
9-2	Loss	(Lithuania) Oscar Milkitas	PTS	4 (4)	2005-09-18	York Hall, Bethnal Green, London, United Kingdom	
9-1	Win	(Sri Lanka) Jus Wallie	PTS	4 (4)	2005-06-12	Equinox Nightclub, Leicester Square, London, United Kingdom	
8-1	Win	(United Kingdom) David Kehoe	PTS	4 (4)	2005-04-24	Equinox Nightclub, Leicester Square, London, United Kingdom	
7-1	Loss	(Mauritius) Judex Meemea	PTS	6 (6)	2005-03-26	Empire Theatre, Hackney, London, United Kingdom	
7-0	Win	(United Kingdom) Keith Jones	PTS	6 (6)	2004-12-02	National Sports Centre, Crystal Palace, London, United Kingdom	
6-0	Win	(United Kingdom) Arv Mittoo	PTS	4 (4)	2004-06-19	Alexandra Palace, Wood Green, London, United Kingdom	
5-0	Win	(United Kingdom) Chris Brophy	TKO	3 (4)	2004-06-05	York Hall, Bethnal Green, London, United Kingdom	
4-0	Win	(United Kingdom) Karl Taylor	PTS	4 (4)	2004-04-25	Metrodome, Barnsley, Yorkshire, United Kingdom	
3-0	Win	(United Kingdom) David Kirk	PTS	6 (6)	2003-07-22	Ice Arena, Nottingham, Nottinghamshire, United Kingdom	
2-0	Win	(United Kingdom) Brian Coleman	PTS	6 (6)	2003-06-03	York Hall, Bethnal Green, London, United Kingdom	
1-0	Win	(United Kingdom) Lee Bedell	TKO	4 (4)	2003-06-03	York Hall, Bethnal Green, London, United Kingdom	Professional debut
