= Willie Limond =

Scottish boxer (1979–2024)

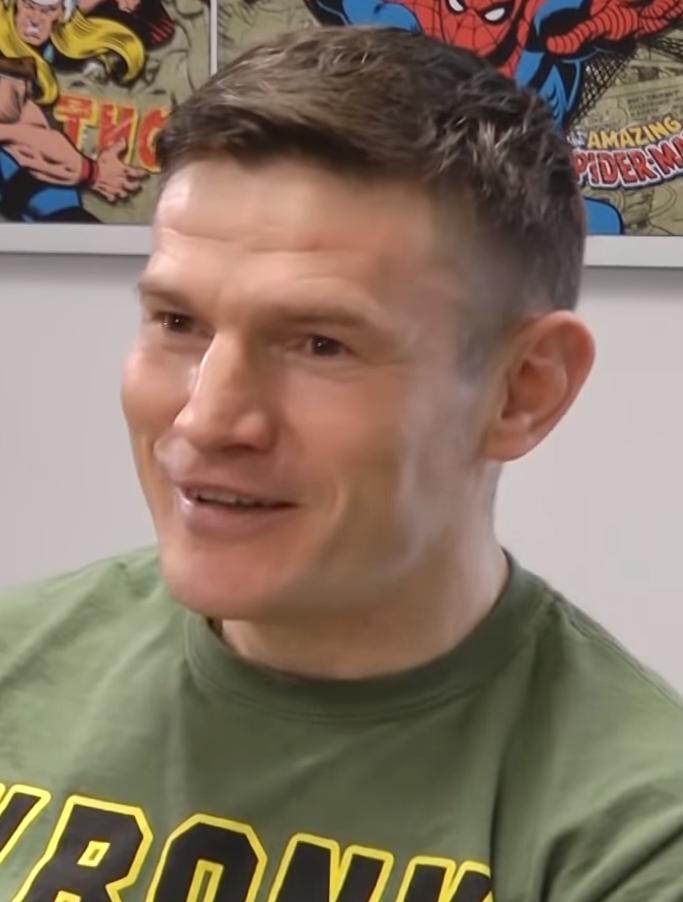
- Limond in 2019

Personal information
- Born: 2 February 1979 Glasgow, Scotland
- Died: 15 April 2024 (aged 45) Airdrie, Scotland
- Height: 5 ft 8 in (1.73 m)
- Weight: Super featherweight; Lightweight; Light welterweight

Boxing career
- Stance: Orthodox

Boxing record
- Total fights: 48
- Wins: 42
- Win by KO: 13
- Losses: 6
- Draws: 0
- No contests: 0

Willie Limond (2 February 1979 – 15 April 2024) was a Scottish professional boxer. He held the European super-featherweight title in 2004, the Commonwealth lightweight title from 2006 to 2007, the Commonwealth super-lightweight title from 2013 to 2014 and the British super-lightweight title in 2014.

== Professional career ==
=== Debut and British super-featherweight title fight ===
Limond started out as a footballer, making five league appearances for Albion Rovers in the 1998–99 season.

His professional boxing career began in 1999 with a win over Lenny Hodgkins. He won his first 18 fights, including a notable success over future World Boxing Union (WBU) featherweight champion Choi Tseveenpurev.

This led to a showdown with fellow undefeated Scotsman Alex Arthur for the British super-featherweight title on 12 December 2003 at Braehead Arena in Glasgow. Limond was defeated by technical knockout in the eighth round.

=== European super-featherweight title ===
Limond went on to pick up a few more wins before earning himself a shot at the vacant European super-featherweight title. He fought the French champion Youssouf Djibaba on 19 June 2004, at the Braehead Arena and won via unanimous decision.

After a successful defense against Alberto López, Limond went on to win the Celtic super-featherweight title against Kevin O'Hara on 17 June 2005.

=== Commonwealth lightweight title ===
Limond stepped up in weight divisions to lightweight and took on Ghana's Joshua Allotey for the vacant Commonwealth title on 4 November 2006 at the Kelvin Hall in Glasgow, winning via unanimous decision.

He lost the title in his first defence, to future world champion, Amir Khan, on 14 July 2007. He knocked Khan down in the sixth round but ultimately failed to defeat the 2004 Olympic silver medallist and was retired by his own corner at the end of the eighth round. The loss was not without controversy, as some spectators thought that Khan had been given a long count after Limond had sent him to the canvas.

=== IBO Inter-Continental and WBU lightweight titles ===
With the loss of his Commonwealth title, he defeated Martin Watson for the vacant IBO Inter-Continental title on 29 March 2008, at the Scottish Exhibition and Conference Centre in Glasgow on a unanimous points decision. In Paisley on 27 February 2009, Limond defeated Harry Ramogoadi on points victory in a non-title bout.

Limond and fought Ryan Barrett for the WBU lightweight title on 29 May 2009 at the Thistle Hotel, Glasgow, winning by unanimous decision.

=== Bout with Erik Morales ===
On 11 September 2010, Limond took on former champion Erik Morales for the WBC Silver light-welterweight title. In the sixth round Limond was knocked down three times causing the referee to call the fight off, awarding Morales a stoppage victory.

=== New promoter and Anthony Crolla fight ===
After signing with promoter Tommy Gilmour, Limond fought Anthony Crolla for the British lightweight title in Motherwell on 25 November 2011, but lost by unanimous decision.

=== Commonwealth and British super-lightweight champion ===
Limond returned from the Crolla setback with a routine six round win over William Warburton in Dundee on 1 September 2012, after moving up to super-lightweight. He fought unbeaten Eddie Doyle, for the vacant Commonwealth super-lightweight title in Glasgow on 21 January 2013. Limond drooped his opponent twice, winning by technical knockout in the first round.

He successfully defended his title with a unanimous decision win over Mitch Prince in Glasgow on 7 June 2013, before adding the British super-lightweight belt to his collection by defeating Curtis Woodhouse via majority decision, again in Glasgow, on 27 June 2014. Having vacated both titles, he challenged British super-lightweight champion Tyrone Nurse in Glasgow on 28 May 2016, losing by stoppage in the ninth round.

=== Final fights ===
Limond fought only three more times after 2016. He defeated William Warburton on points over six rounds in Glasgow on 6 June 2019. Almost three years later, on 13 May 2022, Limond best CJ Wood in Renfrew with his son, Jake, fighting on the undercard.

His last fight was against Ricky Burns at Braehead Arena in Glasgow on 1 September 2023. Limond lost by stoppage in the eighth round.

== Death ==
In April 2024, Limond suffered a seizure. After 10 days at Monklands Hospital in Airdrie, North Lanarkshire, Limond died on 15 April 2024, at the age of 45.

== Professional boxing record ==
48 fights	42 wins	6 losses
By knockout	13	5
By decision	29	1

No.	Result	Record	Opponent	Type	Round, Time	Date	Location	Notes
48	Loss	42–6	Ricky Burns	TKO	8 (12), 3:00	1 Sep 2023	Braehead Arena, Glasgow, Scotland	
47	Win	42–5	CJ Wood	TKO	3 (6), 2:20	13 May 2022	Normandy Hotel, Renfrew, Scotland	
46	Win	41–5	William Warburton	PTS	6	6 Jun 2019	Radisson Blu Hotel, Glasgow, Scotland	
45	Win	40–5	Michal Vosyka	TKO	2 (4), 2:01	18 Dec 2016	Thistle Hotel, Glasgow, Scotland	
44	Loss	39–5	Tyrone Nurse	TKO	9 (12), 1:54	28 May 2016	The SSE Hydro, Glasgow, Scotland	For British light-welterweight title
43	Win	39–4	Zaurs Sadihovs	TKO	1 (6), 2:04	30 Jan 2016	Marriott Hotel, Glasgow, Scotland	
42	Win	38–4	Curtis Woodhouse	MD	12	27 Jun 2014	Braehead Arena, Glasgow, Scotland	Retained Commonwealth light-welterweight title; Won British light-welterweight title
41	Win	37–4	Mitch Prince	UD	12	7 Jun 2013	Bellahouston Leisure Centre, Glasgow, Scotland	Retained Commonwealth light-welterweight title
40	Win	36–4	Eddie Doyle	TKO	1 (12), 1:56	21 Jan 2013	Radisson Blu Hotel, Glasgow, Scotland	Won vacant Commonwealth light-welterweight title
39	Win	35–4	William Warburton	PTS	6	1 Sep 2012	Ice Arena, Dundee, Scotland	
38	Loss	34–4	Anthony Crolla	UD	12	25 Nov 2011	Ravenscraigs Sports Centre, Motherwell, Scotland	For British lightweight title
37	Win	34–3	Arek Malek	PTS	6	3 Jun 2011	Kelvin Hall, Glasgow, Scotland	
36	Loss	33–3	Erik Morales	KO	6 (12), 2:46	11 Sep 2010	Monumental Plaza de Toros México, Mexico City, Mexico	For vacant WBC Silver light-welterweight title
35	Win	33–2	Duncan Cottier	PTS	8	15 Nov 2009	Pavilion Theatre Ballroom, Glasgow, Scotland	
34	Win	32–2	Ryan Barrett	UD	12	29 May 2009	Thistle Hotel, Glasgow, Scotland	Won vacant WBU lightweight title
33	Win	31–2	Harry Ramogoadi	PTS	8	27 Feb 2009	Lagoon Leisure Centre, Paisley, Scotland	
32	Win	30–2	Matt Scriven	PTS	8	18 Oct 2008	Lagoon Leisure Centre, Paisley, Scotland	
31	Win	29–2	Martin Watson	UD	12	29 Mar 2008	Scottish Exhibition Centre, Glasgow, Scotland	Won vacant IBO Inter-Continental lightweight title
30	Loss	28–2	Amir Khan	RTD	8 (12), 3:00	14 Jul 2007	O2 Arena, Greenwich, England	Lost Commonwealth lightweight title
29	Win	28–1	Joshua Allotey	UD	12	4 Nov 2006	Kelvin Hall, Glasgow, Scotland	Won vacant Commonwealth lightweight title
28	Win	27–1	Jus Wallie	PTS	6	5 Nov 2005	Braehead Arena, Glasgow, Scotland	
27	Win	26–1	Kevin O'Hara	PTS	10	17 Jun 2005	Kelvin Hall, Glasgow, Scotland	Won Celtic super-featherweight title
26	Win	25–1	John Mackay	TKO	5 (8), 2:13	20 May 2005	Marriott Hotel, Glasgow, Scotland	
25	Win	24–1	Alberto López	UD	10	3 Dec 2004	Meadowbank Sports Centre, Edinburgh, Scotland	Retained European Union super-featherweight title
24	Win	23–1	Frederic Bonifai	PTS	8	29 Oct 2004	Braehead Arena, Glasgow, Scotland	
23	Win	22–1	Youssouf Djibaba	UD	10	19 Jun 2004	Braehead Arena, Glasgow, Scotland	Won vacant European Union super-featherweight title
22	Win	21–1	Dafydd Carlin	TKO	1 (4), 1:29	6 Mar 2004	Braehead Arena, Glasgow, Scotland	
21	Win	20–1	Anthony Hanna	PTS	4	29 Nov 2003	Braehead Arena, Glasgow, Scotland	
20	Win	19–1	Dariusz Snarski	TKO	1 (6), 2:18	1 Nov 2003	Bellahouston Leisure Centre, Glasgow, Scotland	
19	Loss	18–1	Alex Arthur	TKO	8 (12), 1:51	12 Mar 2003	Braehead Arena, Glasgow, Scotland	For British super-featherweight title
18	Win	18–0	Jimmy Beech	KO	4 (8), 1:39	22 Mar 2003	Braehead Arena, Glasgow, Scotland	
17	Win	17–0	Asen Vasilev	TKO	3 (8), 2:12	6 Sep 2002	Thistle Hotel, Glasgow, Scotland	
16	Win	16–0	Dave Hinds	PTS	6	11 Mar 2002	Kelvin Hall, Glasgow, Scotland	
15	Win	15–0	Keith Jones	PTS	4	17 Nov 2001	Bellahouston Leisure Centre, Glasgow, Scotland	
14	Win	14–0	Rakhim Mingaleyev	PTS	6	3 Nov 2001	Bellahouston Leisure Centre, Glasgow, Scotland	
13	Win	13–0	Gary Reid	PTS	8	7 Sep 2001	Thistle Hotel, Glasgow, Scotland	
12	Win	12–0	Choi Tseveenpurev	PTS	6	27 Apr 2001	Thistle Hotel, Glasgow, Scotland	
11	Win	11–0	Trevor Smith	PTS	4	3 Apr 2001	York Hall, Bethnal Green, England	
10	Win	10–0	Marcus Portman	PTS	6	15 Feb 2001	Thistle Hotel, Glasgow, Scotland	
9	Win	9–0	Billy Smith	PTS	6	17 Dec 2000	Thistle Hotel, Glasgow, Scotland	
8	Win	8–0	Danny Connelly	PTS	6	10 Nov 2000	Thistle Hotel, Glasgow, Scotland	
7	Win	7–0	Haroon Din	PTS	4	24 Jun 2000	Hampden Park, Glasgow, Scotland	
6	Win	6–0	Billy Smith	PTS	4	26 May 2000	Thistle Hotel, Glasgow, Scotland	
5	Win	5–0	Jimmy Beech	TKO	2 (6), 0:30	7 Apr 2000	Thistle Hotel, Glasgow, Scotland	
4	Win	4–0	Phil Lashley	TKO	1 (4)	18 Mar 2000	Kelvin Hall, Glasgow, Scotland	
3	Win	3–0	Nigel Senior	TKO	6 (6)	24 Feb 2000	Thistle Hotel, Glasgow, Scotland	
2	Win	2–0	Steve Hanley	PTS	6	13 Dec 1999	Thistle Hotel, Glasgow, Scotland	
1	Win	1–0	Lenny Hodgkinz	RTD	1 (6), 2:00	12 Nov 1999	Thistle Hotel, Glasgow, Scotland	
