= Johnny Greaves (boxer) =

English boxer

Personal information
- Nationality: English
- Born: 4 March 1979 (age 47) Forest Gate, London, England
- Height: 5 ft 9 in (175 cm)
- Weight: Light welterweight

Boxing career
- Stance: Southpaw

Boxing record
- Total fights: 100
- Wins: 4
- Win by KO: 1
- Losses: 96
- Draws: 0

Johnny Greaves (born 4 March 1979) is an English former light welterweight professional boxer. A prolific journeyman, he fought in 100 matches during his professional career, winning four in total – including his final fight.

== Career ==
Greaves turned professional in 2007, after a brief spell as an amateur while fighting on the unlicensed circuit. He marked his debut with a points loss against Rob Hunt (4–0–0). With his first ten fights ending in defeat, Greaves managed to win his eleventh with a first-round technical knockout against Sergejs Rozakmens (2–21–1). Match ups stopped coming for a while after his first win, with promoters wary about the risk of exposing one of their fighters against a boxer who could potentially ruin unbeaten records. But like most journeymen, Greaves settled for a life fighting up and coming prospects.

His next two wins came against Ali Wyatt (4–11–2) and Floyd Moore (in his professional debut), winning both on point verdicts. The latter, Moore eventually beat Greaves in a rematch a few years later. Greaves ended his career in 2013 at York Hall with a win against Dan Carr (2–42–2).

The documentary film Cornered, shown on BT Sport, follows the life of Greaves during the latter stages of his boxing career.
