= Dalton Smith (boxer) =

British boxer (born 1997)

Personal information
- Nickname: Thunder
- Born: 8 February 1997 (age 29) Sheffield, Yorkshire, England
- Height: 5 ft 9 1/2 in (177 cm)
- Weight: Light welterweight

Boxing career
- Reach: 69 1/2 in (177 cm)
- Stance: Orthodox

Boxing record
- Total fights: 20
- Wins: 20
- Win by KO: 14
Medal record
Men's Amateur boxing
Representing England
Commonwealth Youth Games
Bronze medal – third place	2015 Apia	Lightweight
European Youth Championships
Silver medal – second place	2014 Zagreb	Lightweight
ABA Championships
Gold medal – first place	2018 London	Light-welterweight

Dalton Smith (born 8 February 1997) is a British professional boxer. He has held the World Boxing Council (WBC) super-lightweight title since January 2026. Previously, he held the European super-lightweight title in 2025, the British title between 2022 and 2024, and the Commonwealth title in 2023. As an amateur, he won a silver medal at the 2014 European Youth Championships and bronze at the 2015 Commonwealth Youth Games, both in the lightweight division, and won the 2018 ABA Championships at light-welterweight.

== Amateur career ==
As an amateur Smith won multiple national titles at the junior and senior level, including the 2018 ABA Championships at light-welterweight. At the international level he won a silver medal at the 2014 European Youth Championships and bronze at the 2015 Commonwealth Youth Games, both in the lightweight division. He also competed at the 2013 World Junior Championships, reaching the quarter-finals; the 2014 World Youth Championships, losing in the round of 8; and the 2016, 2017 and 2018 World Series of Boxing as part of the British Lionhearts.

== Professional career ==
=== Early career ===
After deciding to forgo the 2020 Olympics – due to rule changes regarding weight categories, along with several injuries suffered throughout his amateur career – Smith signed a promotional contract with Eddie Hearn's Matchroom Boxing in May 2019, making his professional debut two months later on 10 May, scoring a four-round points decision (PTS) victory over Luka Leskovic at the Motorpoint Arena in Nottingham.

In his next fight he defeated Ibrar Riyaz with a second-round stoppage via corner retirement (RTD) on 21 July as part of the undercard for Dillian Whyte vs. Oscar Rivas. Smith became only the fourth man to stop Riyaz, a career journeyman who at the time had a record of 6–165–4. Three months later he travelled to Italy, defeating Marko Radenovic via third-round technical knockout (TKO) before ending the year with a third-round TKO win against Michael Carrero in November.

On 7 March 2020 at the Manchester Arena, Smith fought Benson Nyilawila, winning by fourth-round TKO in a bout that was streamed live on Facebook.

=== Domestic success ===
On 6 August 2022, Smith defeated Sam O'maison via 6th round TKO to win the British super lightweight championship.

On 1 July 2023, Smith knocked out Sam Maxwell in round 7 and won the Commonwealth super lightweight championship. Smith vacated the title one month later.

On 23 March 2024 in Sheffield, England, Smith was scheduled to face Jose Zepeda. He won the fight by knockout in the fifth round with body shot, winning the vacant WBC Silver super lightweight title.

Smith was originally scheduled to face Jon Fernandez for the vacant European super lightweight title in Sheffield, England on 28 September 2024, However, the bout was cancelled on September 6 due to unclear reasons.

On 25 January 2025 in Nottingham, England, Smith defeated Walid Ouizza by knockout in the first round to defend his WBC Silver super lightweight title and win the vacant EBU European super lightweight title.

Smith faced Mathieu Germain at Canon Medical Arena in Sheffield on 19 April 2025. He won the fight by unanimous decision.

=== WBC Super lightweight champion ===
==== Smith vs. Matias ====
Smith challenged WBC super-lightweight champion, Subriel Matías, at Barclays Center in Brooklyn, New York, USA, on 10 January 2026. Smith won by technical knockout in the fifth round.

==== Smith vs. Puello ====
Smith was scheduled to make the first defense of his WBC super lightweight title against Alberto Puello at Utilita Arena Sheffield in Sheffield, England, on 6 June 2026. On 27 April 2026, Smith pulled out of the fight due to an elbow injury. The card was still scheduled to go ahead with Galal Yafai vs. Ricardo Sandoval as the new main event, but Yafai also suffered an injury and the whole card was cancelled. Dan Rafael reported that Smith's fight with Puello had been rescheduled to 24 October 2026 at the same venue. Smith retained his title by split decision win, with two judges scoring the fight 115–113 in his favour, and the other scoring it 116–112 for Puello.

== Professional boxing record ==
20 fights	20 wins	0 losses
By knockout	14	0
By decision	6	0

No.	Result	Record	Opponent	Type	Round, time	Date	Location	Notes
20	Win	20–0	Alberto Puello	SD	12	24 Oct 2026	Sheffield Arena, Sheffield, England	Retained WBC light-welterweight title
19	Win	19–0	Subriel Matías	TKO	5 (12), 2:24	10 Jan 2026	Barclays Center, New York City, New York, U.S.	Won WBC light-welterweight title
18	Win	18–0	Mathieu Germain	UD	12	19 Apr 2025	Canon Medical Arena, Sheffield, England	Retained WBC Silver light-welterweight title
17	Win	17–0	Walid Ouizza	TKO	1 (12), 3:00	25 Jan 2025	Motorpoint Arena, Nottingham, England	Retained WBC Silver light-welterweight title; Won vacant European light-welterweight title
16	Win	16–0	Jose Zepeda	KO	5 (12), 1:25	23 Mar 2024	Sheffield Arena, Sheffield, England	Won vacant WBC Silver light-welterweight title
15	Win	15–0	Sam Maxwell	TKO	7 (12), 1:34	1 Jul 2023	Sheffield Arena, Sheffield, England	Retained British light-welterweight title; Won Commonwealth light-welterweight title
14	Win	14–0	Billy Allington	UD	12	18 Feb 2023	Motorpoint Arena, Nottingham, England	Retained British light-welterweight title
13	Win	13–0	Kaisee Benjamin	UD	12	12 Nov 2022	Manchester Arena, Manchester, England	Retained British light-welterweight title
12	Win	12–0	Sam O'maison	TKO	6 (12), 2:55	6 Aug 2022	Sheffield Arena, Sheffield, England	Won vacant British light-welterweight title
11	Win	11–0	Mauro Perouene	RTD	6 (10), 3:00	4 Jun 2022	Motorpoint Arena, Cardiff, Wales	Retained WBC International Silver light-welterweight title
10	Win	10–0	Ray Moylette	TKO	10 (10), 0:49	26 Mar 2022	First Direct Arena, Leeds, England	Won vacant WBC International Silver light-welterweight title
9	Win	9–0	Brian Pelaez	UD	10	10 Sep 2021	Wörthersee Stadion, Klagenfurt, Austria	Won vacant WBA Inter-Continental light-welterweight title
8	Win	8–0	Lee Appleyard	TKO	6 (10), 2:44	15 May 2021	AO Arena, Manchester, England	Won vacant English light-welterweight title
7	Win	7–0	Ishmael Ellis	RTD	3 (10), 3:00	13 Feb 2021	The SSE Arena, London, England	
6	Win	6–0	Nathan Bennett	KO	5 (8), 2:57	1 Aug 2020	Matchroom Headquarters, Brentwood, England	
5	Win	5–0	Benson Nyilawila	TKO	4 (6), 0:18	7 Mar 2020	Manchester Arena, Manchester, England	
4	Win	4–0	Michael Carrero	TKO	3 (6), 2:47	2 Nov 2019	Manchester Arena, Manchester, England	
3	Win	3–0	Marko Radenovic	TKO	3 (6)	11 Oct 2019	PalaTrento, Trento, Italy	
2	Win	2–0	Ibrar Riyaz	RTD	2 (4), 3:00	20 Jul 2019	The O2 Arena, London, England	
1	Win	1–0	Luka Leskovic	PTS	4	10 May 2019	Motorpoint Arena, Nottingham, England	

== See also ==
- List of male boxers
- List of British world boxing champions
- List of world light-welterweight boxing champions

Sporting positions
Amateur boxing titles
Previous: Thomas Hodgson	ABA light-welterweight champion 2018	Next: Sam Noakes
Regional boxing titles
Vacant Title last held by Kay Prospere	English light-welterweight champion 15 May 2021 – 2021; Vacated	Vacant Title next held by Billy Allington
Vacant Title last held by Lewis Ritson	WBA Intercontinental light-welterweight champion 10 September 2021 – 2022; Vacated	Vacant Title next held by Steve Spark
Vacant Title last held by Ivan Kozlovsky	WBC International light-welterweight champion 26 March 2022 – 2022; Vacated	Vacant Title next held by Henry Turner
Vacant Title last held by Sam Maxwell	British light-welterweight champion 6 August 2022 – 2024; Vacated	Vacant Title next held by Jack Rafferty
Preceded by Sam Maxwell	Commonwealth light-welterweight champion 1 July 2023 – 2023; Vacated	Vacant Title next held by Jack Rafferty
Vacant Title last held by Richardson Hitchins	WBC Silver light-welterweight champion 23 March 2024 – 11 January 2026; Won world title	Vacant
Vacant Title last held by Adam Azim	European light-welterweight champion 25 January 2025 – 2025; Vacated	Vacant Title next held by Pierce O'Leary
World boxing titles
Preceded by Subriel Matías	WBC light-welterweight champion 10 January 2026 – present	Incumbent
