= Tamila Sarikhanova =

Sports administrator

Personal information
- National team: Uzbekistan
- Born: June 13, 1992 (age 34)
- Education: Management Development Institute of Singapore in Tashkent
- Occupation: Team Manager
- Employer(s): IBA, Uzbekistan Boxing Federation

Sport
- Country: Uzbekistan
- Sport: Amateur Boxing
- Position: Manager
- Team: Uzbek Tigers

Tamila Sarikhanova (uz: Tamila Sarixanova, ru: Тамила Сарыханова), born June 13, 1992, is a team manager of Uzbek Tigers and Uzbekistan Olympic Boxing Team, Vice Chairman of IBA's Member Federations Committee and the first female IBA Supervisor from Uzbekistan.

== Biography ==
Tamila Sarikhanova was born in Tashkent, Uzbekistan, on 13 June 1992. She graduated from the Management Development Institute of Singapore in Tashkent in 2015 and started working for the Uzbekistan Boxing Federation as the head of the international department. In 2016, she began managing the Uzbek Tigers, the team obtained a bronze medal at the end of the WSB season.

== Career ==
- 2015-2023 Head of International Department of Uzbekistan Boxing Federation
- 2015-2018 - Team manager of Uzbek Tigers
- 2018-2023 Manager of the National Olympic Boxing Team of Uzbekistan
- 2021 - Member of the Asian Boxing Confederation Women's Commission.
- 2023- Vice Chairman of IBA's Member Federations Committee
- 2023- IBA Technical Supervisor and International technical official.
