= 2016 World Series of Boxing =

Boxing competition

The 2016 World Series of Boxing is the sixth edition of the World Series of Boxing since its establishment in 2010 and runs from January 18 to May 21 of 2016. The event is organised by the International Boxing Association (AIBA). The sixteen teams, divided into four groups of four, contain a majority of boxers from the country in which they are based along with a smaller number of overseas boxers.

Astana Arlans (Kazakhstan) is the defending champion.

== Teams ==
- Argentina Condors
- (Kazakhstan) Astana Arlans
- (Azerbaijan) Baku Fires
- (United Kingdom) British Lionhearts
- Caciques de Venezuela
- China Dragons
- Cuba Domadores
- Mexico Guerreros
- Morocco Atlas Lions
- Puerto Rico Hurricanes
- Rafako Hussars Poland
- (Russia) Russian Boxing Team
- (Turkey) Türkiye Conquerors
- Ukraine Otamans
- (United States) USA Knockouts
- (Uzbekistan) Uzbek Tigers

== Group stage ==
=== Group A ===
Team	Pts	Matches				Bouts				
Team	Pts	Total	Wins	Draws	Losses	Total	Wins	TD	Losses	W/O
Cuba Domadores	16	6	5	0	1	30	27	0	3	0
Ukraine Otamans	9	6	3	0	3	30	14	0	16	0
(Turkey) Türkiye Conquerors	7	6	2	0	4	30	10	0	20	0
China Dragons	7	6	2	0	4	30	9	0	21	0

16 January 2016
19:30 GTM +3

Türkiye Conquerors (Turkey)	3–2	China Dragons

Bağcılar Olympic Sport Hall, Istanbul
31 March 2016
20:30 GTM –4

Cuba Domadores	5–0	Ukraine Otamans

Coliseo de la Ciudad Deportiva, Havana

30 January 2016
18:00 GTM +3

Ukraine Otamans	5–0	China Dragons

Knockout Arena, Vinnytsia
30 January 2016
21:00 GTM +3

Türkiye Conquerors (Turkey)	0–5	Cuba Domadores

Bağcılar Olympic Sport Hall, Istanbul

12 February 2016
19:00 GTM +3

Ukraine Otamans	4–1	(Turkey) Türkiye Conquerors

Lviv National Circus, Lviv
13 February 2016
19:30 GTM +8

China Dragons	0–5	Cuba Domadores

Sanya Sport Center Stadium, Sanya

27 February 2016
19:30 GTM +8

China Dragons (China)	3–2	(Turkey) Türkiye Conquerors

Sanya Sport Center Stadium, Sanya
27 February 2016
19:00 GMT +3

Ukraine Otamans	3–2	Cuba Domadores

Palace of Sports, Kharkiv

11 March 2016
20:30 GMT –4

Cuba Domadores	5–0	(Turkey) Türkiye Conquerors

Coliseo de la Ciudad Deportiva, Havana
12 March 2016
19:30 GMT +8

China Dragons	4–1	Ukraine Otamans

Sanya Sport Center Stadium, Sanya

1 April 2016
20:30 GMT –4

Cuba Domadores	5–0	China Dragons

Coliseo de la Ciudad Deportiva, Havana
1 April 2016
19:00 GTM +3

Türkiye Conquerors (Turkey)	4–1	Ukraine Otamans

Bağcılar Olympic Sport Hall, Istanbul

=== Group B ===
Team	Pts	Matches				Bouts				
Team	Pts	Total	Wins	Draws	Losses	Total	Wins	TD	Losses	W/O
(United Kingdom) British Lionhearts	14	6	4	1	1	25	16	0	9	0
Mexico Guerreros	11	6	4	0	2	30	16	0	14	1
(United States) USA Knockouts	10	6	3	0	3	30	16	0	14	0
Morocco Atlas Lions	5	6	0	1	5	30	7	0	18	0

21 January 2016
20:30 GTM +4

USA Knockouts (United States)	2–3	(United Kingdom) British Lionhearts

Miccosukee Sports & Entertainment Dome, Miami
23 January 2016
21:00 GTM –5

Mexico Guerreros	4–1	Morocco Atlas Lions

Unidad Deportiva IV Centenario, Aguascalientes

5 February 2016
22:00 GTM +1

Morocco Atlas Lions	2–3	(United Kingdom) British Lionhearts

Salle Mohammed V, Casablanca
5 February 2016
20:30 GTM +4

USA Knockouts (United States)	4–1	Mexico Guerreros

Miccosukee Sports & Entertainment Dome, Miami

18 February 2016
20:00 GTM +1

British Lionhearts (United Kingdom)	5–0	Mexico Guerreros

York Hall, London
19 February 2016
22:00 GTM +1

Morocco Atlas Lions	2–3	(United States) USA Knockouts

Salle Mohammed V, Casablanca

3 March 2016
20:00 GMT +1

British Lionhearts (United Kingdom)	4–1	(United States) USA Knockouts

York Hall, London
4 March 2016
22:00 GTM +1

Morocco Atlas Lions	2–3	Mexico Guerreros

Salle Mohammed V, Casablanca

26 March 2016
21:00 GMT –5

Mexico Guerreros	4–1	(United States) USA Knockouts

Unidad Deportiva IV Centenario, Aguascalientes

1 April 2016
20:30 GMT –4

USA Knockouts (United States)	5–0	Morocco Atlas Lions

Miccosukee Sports & Entertainment Dome, Miami
2 April 2016
21:00 GTM –5

Mexico Guerreros	4–1	(United Kingdom) British Lionhearts

Unidad Deportiva IV Centenario, Aguascalientes

=== Group C ===
Team	Pts	Matches				Bouts				
Team	Pts	Total	Wins	Draws	Losses	Total	Wins	TD	Losses	W/O
(Russia) Russian Boxing Team	18	6	6	0	0	30	24	0	6	0
Caciques de Venezuela	11	6	3	0	3	30	18	0	12	0
Rafako Hussars Poland	6	6	1	0	5	30	12	0	18	0
Argentina Condors	5	6	2	0	4	30	6	0	24	1

22 January 2016
20:30 GMT +2

Rafako Hussars Poland	2–3	Caciques de Venezuela

Hala ZNICZ, Pruszków
2 April 2016
20:00 GMT +3

Russian Boxing Team (Russia)	5–0	Argentina Condors

Academy Boxing Gym, Moscow

29 January 2016
21:30 GMT –3

Argentina Condors	3–2	Caciques de Venezuela

Coliseo de la FAB, Buenos Aires
30 January 2016
20:00 GMT +2

Rafako Hussars Poland	2–3	(Russia) Russian Boxing Team

Hala MOSRIR, Szczecin

13 February 2016
20:00 GMT –4.5

Caciques de Venezuela	2–3	(Russia) Russian Boxing Team

Domo José María Vargas, Maiquetía
13 February 2016
22:15 GMT –3

Argentina Condors	3–2	Rafako Hussars Poland

Coliseo de la FAB, Buenos Aires

26 February 2016
22:00 GMT –3

Argentina Condors	0–5	(Russia) Russian Boxing Team

Coliseo de la FAB, Buenos Aires
27 February 2016
20:00 GMT –4.5

Caciques de Venezuela	5–0	Rafako Hussars Poland

Domo José María Vargas, Maiquetía

26 February 2016
20:30 GMT –4.5

Caciques de Venezuela	5–0	Argentina Condors

Domo José María Vargas, Maiquetía
12 March 2016
18:00 GMT +3

Russian Boxing Team (Russia)	4–1	Rafako Hussars Poland

Academy Boxing Gym, Moscow

1 April 2016
22:00 GMT +3

Russian Boxing Team (Russia)	4–1	Caciques de Venezuela

Academy Boxing Gym, Moscow
1 April 2016
20:30 GMT +2

Rafako Hussars Poland	5–0	Argentina Condors

Mosir Dębica, Kraków

=== Group D ===
Team	Pts	Matches				Bouts				
Team	Pts	Total	Wins	Draws	Losses	Total	Wins	TD	Losses	W/O
(Kazakhstan) Astana Arlans	14	6	5	0	1	30	22	0	8	1
(Uzbekistan) Uzbek Tigers	13	6	4	0	2	30	22	0	8	0
Azerbaijan Baku Fire	7	6	2	0	4	30	11	0	18	1
Puerto Rico Hurricanes	0	6	1	0	5	30	4	0	25	3

== Play-offs ==
Quarterfinals
A1	Cuba Domadores	5	5	10
B2	Mexico Guerreros	0	0	0
C1	(Russia) Russian Boxing Team	2	2	4
D2	(Uzbekistan) Uzbek Tigers	3	3	6
B1	(United Kingdom) British Lionhearts	4	4	8
A2	Ukraine Otamans	1	1	2
D1	(Kazakhstan) Astana Arlans	4	5	9
C2	Caciques de Venezuela	1	0	1

Semifinals
A1	Cuba Domadores	5	5	10
D2	(Uzbekistan) Uzbek Tigers	0	0	0
B1	(United Kingdom) British Lionhearts	3	4	7
D1	(Kazakhstan) Astana Arlans	2	1	3

Finals
A1	Cuba Domadores	5	4	9
B1	(United Kingdom) British Lionhearts	0	1	1
