= Rakhmatjon Ruziakhunov =

- Born: 15 April 1968 (age 57); Andijan, Uzbekistan
- Education: Bachelor
- Alma mater: Uzbek state university of physical culture and sport
- Occupation: Boxing trainer
- Years active: 2000-
- Employer: Uzbekistan Boxing Federation
- Title: Honored Coach of the Republic of Uzbekistan

Rakhmatjon Ruziakhunov (uzb: Rahmatjon Ro`ziohunov; ru: Рахматжон Рузиохунов: born April 15, 1968, in Andijan, Uzbek SSR, USSR)- is a Senior coach of the national boxing team of Uzbekistan since. Winner of the title "Honored Coach of Uzbekistan" (2016). In 2015–2017, he served as the head coach of the women's national boxing team and main coch of half professional WSB Team Uzbek Tigers.

== Biography ==
Ruziakhunov was born on April 15, 1968, in Andijan, Uzbekistan. In 1994 he graduated from the Uzbek State University of Physical Culture and Sports Faculty of "Physical culture and boxing coach"

=== Career ===
From 1986-1987, he studied at Andijan sports school of boxing coach.Then, in 1990-1994 he continued his study at Uzbek State Institute of Physical Culture. Between 1994 and 2000, he worked as a sports instructor of the commercial firm "Absidian Production". Afterwards, in 2001–2015 years, he held the position of Muay Thai coach at 9th Youth Sports School of the Olympic Reserve located in Tashkent city, Following that, he appointed as a Head coach of the National Women's Boxing Team at Uzbekistan Boxing Federation. In the years of 2015-2018, he served as a head coach in the semi-professional team “Uzbek Tigers”. Since 2016 he has been working as a coach of boxing department of the Republican Higher School of Sportsmanship in individual wrestling. From 2016 onward, he has been employed as a Senior coach of the National Boxing Team of Uzbekistan.

He has trained Rio 2016 bronze medalist Murodjon Akhmadaliev, Tokyo 2020 Olympic games champion Bakhodir Jalolov, Elnur Abduraimov, Israil Madrimov, Lazizbek Mullojonov, Olympic silver medalist (2016) Bektemira Melikuziev and others.

== Awards ==
- "Honored Coach of Uzbekistan" (2016)
