= Astana Presidential Club =

Kazakh multi-sports club

- Founded: December 2012
- Dissolved: October 2020
- Based in: Astana, Kazakhstan
- President: Askar Batalov
- Members: Astana Pro Team; Barys Astana; FC Astana; BC Astana; Astana Arlans

The 'Astana' Presidential Club (Kazakh: Астана президенттік клубы, romanized: Astana prezidenttık kluby) was a multi-sports club established under the initiative of Nursultan Nazarbayev in 2012. The main aim of the club was to support and develop professional sports and sports of high achievement in Kazakhstan and promote the image of Astana and Kazakhstan in general, on the international arena.

In October 2020, the Astana Presidential Club was dissolved to reduce administrative costs, with its professional teams transferred to the Samruk-Kazyna Trust.

== Dissolution ==
In Oc 2020, the club was shut down following a period of budget devaluation and criminal investigations into embezzlement involving former directors. According to Askar Batalov, the club's final general director, the administrative operations of the PPSC consumed approximately 1% of the total 27 billion tenge budget. By dissolving the umbrella organisation, the sovereign wealth fund Samruk-Kazyna aimed to save 270 million tenge annually in administrative fields.

== Members ==
=== Former member teams ===
Before its closure, the club consisted of the following members:

- Astana Arlans - an amateur boxing team, competes in the World Series of Boxing tournament. They are champion of 2012–13 WSB season.
- Astana Pro Team - a professional road bicycle racing team, competes in the UCI World Tour.
- Barys Astana - an ice hockey team, plays in the Kontinental Hockey League (KHL).
- FC Astana - a professional football team, plays in the Kazakhstan Premier League. The first Kazakh club to participate in the knockout phase of a UEFA club competition
- BC Astana - a basketball team, plays in the VTB United League.

=== Teams disbanded prior to 2020 ===
- Astana Dakar Team - a rally raid team, competed in the Dakar Rally.
- Astana Water Polo Club - a professional water polo team, competed in the National Water Polo Championship.

=== Past Individual members ===
- Denis Ten - was a figure skater. He was the 2014 Olympic bronze medalist, the 2013 World silver medalist and the 2011 Asian Winter Games champion.
- Ilya Ilyin - is a weightlifter. Ilyin has won two Asian and Olympic championships and three world championships. He is currently the world and Olympic record holder in both the clean and jerk (233 kg) and the overall total (418 kg) in the 94 kg class. He is Kazakhstan's first two-time Olympic champion.
