= Shohid Tillaboev =

Sports administrator

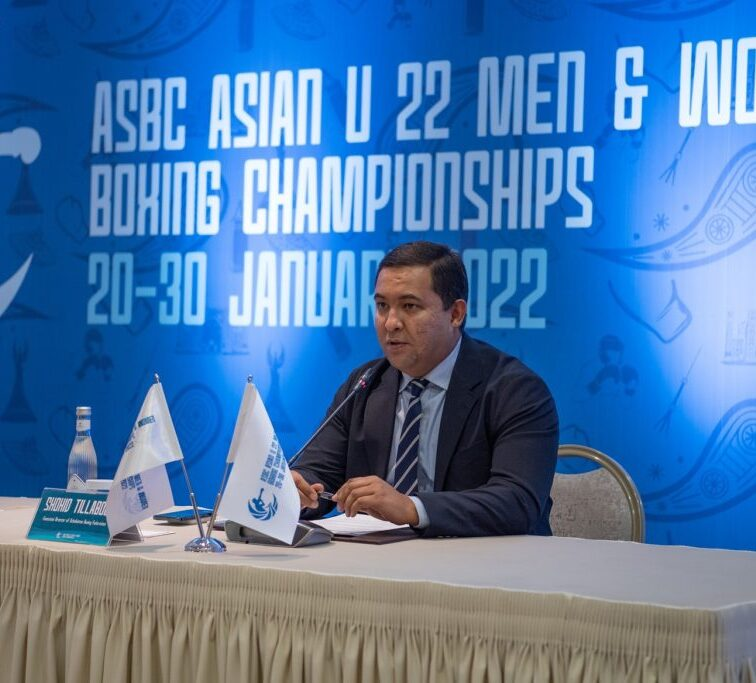

Personal information
- Born: July 12, 1983 (age 42)
- Education: Tashkent State Technical University; Uzbekistan State World Languages University; Master Degree - Uzbek University of physical culture and sport
- Occupation: Secretary General
- Employer(s): Asian Boxing Confederation, IBA, Uzbekistan Boxing Federation

Sport
- Country: Uzbekistan
- Sport: Football, Boxing
- Position: Secretary General
- Event: IBA 2023 World Boxing Championships

Tillaboev Shohid (uzb: Shohid Tillaboyev Uzbek Cyrillic: Шохид Тиллабоев, born July 12. 1983 in Fergana, Uzbekistan) is an Uzbekistani sports administrator, Sport and Competition Commission Chairman of Asian Boxing. He is a former competition member of IBA (International Boxing Association) and ASBC (Asian Boxing Confederation). Since August 2022 has been selected as a Secretary General of Uzbekistan Boxing Federation.

== Biography ==
Tillaboev started his career in a football club as a director of Istiklol FC. Between 2014-2018 he worked for National Olympic Committee of Uzbekistan as a Head of International Relations Department. He has been involved in boxing in 2019 in International relations Department, 2022 January - November executive Director, in 2022 he has been selected as a Secretary General of Uzbekistan Boxing Federation Tillaboev is also competition member of ASBC and IBA, he served as Chairman of organising Committee of 2023 IBA Men's World Boxing Championships that held in Tashkent, Uzbekistan. In 2026, following the newly elected Asian Boxing governance structure, he was appointed Chairperson of the Asian Boxing Sport and Competition Commission.

== Awards ==
2024 «Do'stlik» ('Friendship') Order

== See also ==
- Uzbekistan Boxing Federation
