= 2017 World Series (disambiguation) =

2017 World Series may refer to:

- 2017 Major League Baseball World Series
- 2017 Little League World Series (baseball)
- 2017 Intermediate League World Series (baseball)
- 2017 Junior League World Series (baseball)
- 2017 Senior League World Series (baseball)
- 2017 College World Series (baseball)
- 2017 World Club Series (rugby league)
- 2017 World Series of Boxing
- 2017 World Series of Poker
- 2017 Fast5 Netball World Series
