= Ali Salameh (boxing) =

Sports administrator

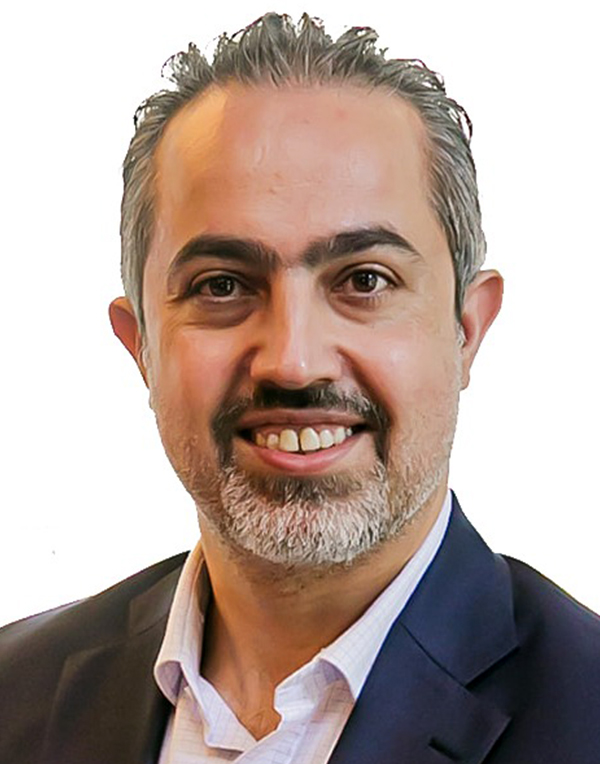

Personal information
- Full name: Ali Salameh
- Nationality: Jordan
- Born: 7 March 1982 (age 44) Kuwait city, Kuwait
- Education: The Hashemite University
- Occupation: Asian Boxing Secretary General
- Years active: 2013
- Employers: Asian Boxing , United Arab Emirates Boxing Federation

Sport
- Country: Jordan
- Sport: Boxing

Ali Salameh (born March 7, 1982, in Kuwait) is a Jordanian sports administrator and Secretary General of Asian Boxing.

== Biography ==
Ali Salameh was born on March 7, 1982, in Kuwait city. Salameh graduated from the Hashemite University in 2005 with a degree in Rehabilitation of Sports Injuries. He started his career in 2005 with the Jordan Football Association, then moved to the Jordan Boxing Association in 2009, serving as executive director and later as Secretary General of ASBC. In 2011, he became a certified International Technical Official with the International Boxing Association (IBA).

In 2014, Salameh became the executive director of the UAE Boxing Federation. In 2019, he was appointed Secretary General of the ASBC.

Since the founding of Asian Boxing in December 2024, he served as Interim Secretary General. On August 2, 2025, he was officially confirmed as Secretary General of Asian Boxing.
