= Uzbek Tigers =

Boxing competitions

- Founded: 2016
- League: World Series Boxing
- Based in: Tashkent
- Colours: Green, White, Blue
- Head coach: Tulkin Kilichev, Rakhmatjon Ruziakhunov, Ravshan Khodjaev
- Manager: Tamila Sarikhanova
- Broadcasters: UzReportTv

The Uzbek Tigers are Uzbek amateur and a semi-professional boxing team that has competed in the WSB World Series of Boxing since season from 2016 to 2018. In the first debut season in 2016 Uzbek Tigers won the bronze medal of WSB tournier. For the Team fought Olympic Games and AIBA World Championship medalists like Hasanboy Dusmatov, Fazliddin Goibnazarov, Bakhodir Jalolov, Shakhram Giyosov, Murodjon Akhmadalaiev and many others.

== History ==
Uzbek Tigers team founded under the Boxing Federation of Uzbekistan and National Olympic Committee of Uzbekistan in 2015 and started to compete in the popular boxing series from the VI season. The competitors were allowed to maintain Olympic and AIBA world championship eligibility. The team was given the status of the National Team of the Republic of Uzbekistan in professional boxing.

== Weight classes and all boxers ==
- Light flyweight (46–49 kg) Hasanboy Dusmatov, Mironshoh Ibragimov, Khudoynazar Fayzov
- Flyweight (-52 kg) Abrorjon Kodirov, Latipov Jasurbek, Nodir Mirzakhmedov,
- Bantamweight (-56 kg) Abdulkhay Sharahmatov, Murodjon Akhmadaliev, Ulugbek Dusmuradov, Shahobiddin Zoirov
- Lightweight (-60 kg) Elnur Abduraimov, Aliyor Noraliev, Shunqor Abdurasulov
- Light welterweight (-64 kg) Fazliddin Goibnazarov, Iqboljon Kholdorov, Fazliddin Meliboev,
- Welterweight (-69 kg) Shakhram Giyasov, Rustam Tulaganov, Makhmud Gaipov, Turdiev Dostonbek, Dilshod Mahmudov, Odiljon Aslonov
- Middleweight (-75 kg) Israil Madrimov, Ulugbek Khaqberdiev, Normatov Khurshidbek,
- Light heavyweight (-81 kg) Shuhrat Abdullaev, Mahkamov Zuhriddin, Bektemir Melikuziev, Madiyar Saidrakhimov,
- Heavyweight (-91 kg) Sanjar Tursunov, Mirzobek Khasanov, Mahkmov Zuhriddin,
- Super heavyweight (91+ kg) Bakhodir Jalolov, Abdullaev Sardor, Ulugbek Mubinov,

== Season 2016 ==
In amateur boxing, the World Series of Boxing (WSB) is being held for the sixth year. The WSB is a unique concept in the form of the world's first boxing league uniting countries on a franchise basis to compete in 10 weight classes - the best amateur boxers competing in the world's professional format competitions. All WSB boxers retain the right to represent their countries at the Olympic Games. As in professional boxing, each fight is decided by a three-judge scoring system, or in some cases by knockout, technical knockout, or waiver. In this year 16 teams are divided into four groups. The Uzbek team "Uzbek Tigers" (Uzbek tigers) for the first time in the history of this tournament took part in the VI season of the World Series of Boxing (WSB), which started on January 16, 2016.

| Week | Date | Fixture | Score | Place |
|---|---|---|---|---|
| 1 | 23.01.2016 | Puerto Rico Hurricanes | 5/0 | San Juan, Puerto Rico |
| 2 | 05.02.2016 | (Azerbaijan) Baku Fires | 3/2 | Baku, Azerbaijan |
| 3 | 26.02.2016 | Puerto Rico Hurricanes | 5/0 | Tashkent, Uzbekistan |
| 4 | 27.02.2016 | (Kazakhstan) Astana Arlans (A) | 4/1 | Tashkent, Uzbekistan |
| 5 | 19.03.2016 | (Azerbaijan) Baku Fires | 5/0 | Tashkent, Uzbekistan |
| 6 | 02.04.2016 | (Kazakhstan) Astana Arlans (A) | 1/4 | Ust-Kamenogorsk, Kazakhstan |
| 7 | 22.04.2016 | (Russia) Russian Boxing Team | 3/2 | Ulyanovsk, Russia |
| 8 | 23.04.2016 | (Russia) Russian Boxing Team | 3/2 | Ulyanovsk, Russia |
| 9 | 05.05.2016 | Cuba Domadores | 0/5 | Havana, Cuba |
| 10 | 06.05.2016 | Cuba Domadores | 0/5 | Havana, Cuba |

== Season 2017 ==
On November 30, 2016, the draw for the 7th season of the World Series of Boxing took place in Geneva, Switzerland. In Season VII, 12 teams are divided into three geographical areas: Americas, Europe / Africa and Asia. The Uzbek team "Uzbek Tigers" got into group "C" with the teams "China Dragons", "Russian Boxing Team" and "Astana Arlans Kazakhstan" In 2017 Uzbek Tigers started cooperation with Buka Boxing Sportswear.

| Week | Date | Fixture | Score | Place |
|---|---|---|---|---|
| 1 | 04.02.2017 | China Dragons | 3/2 | Sanya, China |
| 2 | 18.02.2017 | (Kazakhstan) Astana Arlans | 4/1 | Taldykorgan, Kazakhstan |
| 3 | 04.03.2017 | (Russia) Patriot Boxing Team | 5/0 | Tashkent, Uzbekistan |
| 4 | 18.03.2017 | China Dragons | 5/0 | Tashkent, Uzbekistan |
| 5 | 01.04.2017 | (Kazakhstan) Astana Arlans | 4/1 | Tashkent, Uzbekistan |
| 6 | 21.04.2017 | (Russia) Patriot Boxing Team | 2/3 | Perm, Russia |
| 7 | 13.05.2017 | Cuba Domadores | 3/2 | Samarkand, Uzbekistan |
| 8 | 19.05.2017 | Cuba Domadores | 1/4 | Havana, Cuba |

== Season 2018 ==
The World Series of Boxing (WSB) is in its eighth season. The VIII season of the World Series of Boxing started in February 2018. The Uzbek team "Uzbek Tigers" got into the Americas group with the teams "Cuba Domadores", "Colombian Heroicos", "Caciques de Venezuela". In Season VIII, 12 teams are divided into three geographical areas: Americas, Europe and Asia. Group preliminary matches hold from February to April 2018.

| Week | Date | Fixture | Score | Place |
|---|---|---|---|---|
| 1 | 10.02.2018 | Cuba Domadores | 0/5 | Havana, Cuba |
| 2 | 27.02.2018 | Cuba Domadores | 4/1 | Tashkent, Uzbekistan |
| 3 | 01.03.2018 | Heroicos de Colombia | 4/1 | Tashkent, Uzbekistan |
| 4 | 23.03.2018 | Heroicos de Colombia | 5/0 | Soledad, Colombia |
| 5 | 06.04.2018 | Caciques de Venezuela | 4/1 | Termez, Uzbekistan |
| 6 | 07.04.2018 | Caciques de Venezuela | 5/0 | Termez, Uzbekistan |
