= Bassam Ghanem =

Sports administrator

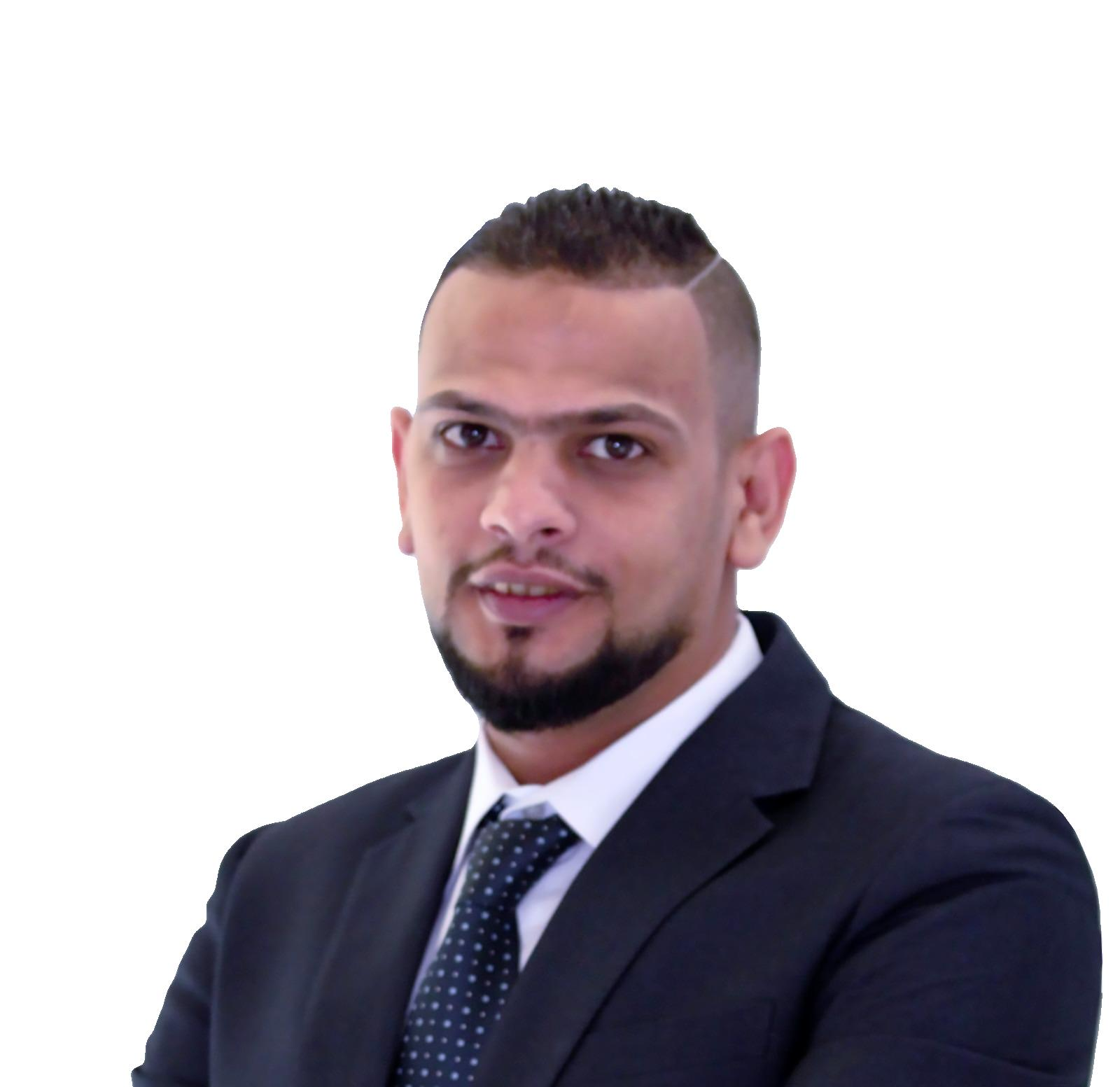

Personal information
- Full name: Bassam Ahmed Ali Ammed Ghanem
- Born: 15 February 1986 (age 40) Mansoura, Egypt
- Education: Higher Institute of Social Work - Mansoura
- Occupation: General Manager
- Years active: 2013
- Employers: Asian Boxing, United Arab Emirates Boxing Federation

Sport
- Country: Egypt
- Sport: Boxing
- Position: Administrative Director

Bassam Ghanem (arabic: بسام غانم born 15 February 1986) is an Egyptian sports executive, General Manager of Asian Boxing and since 2013 Administrative Secretary of United Arab Emirates Boxing Federation.

== Biography ==
Bassam Ghanem was born in Mansoura City, Egypt on 15 February in 1986. Graduated from the Higher Institute for Social Work in Mansoura City, Egypt in 2007 and started working for UAE Boxing Federation and as Administrative Secretary. In 2013 then as executive assistant from 2016, in 2018 he has been appointed as Asian Boxing Confederation (ASBC) Administrative Director till 2023, in 2023 he has been selected as Asian Boxing Confederation (ASBC) Competitions Manager. Following the establishment of a new Asian Boxing organization under World Boxing, he was appointed to the position General Manager—for the newly formed body.
