= Asian Boxing =

Federation for amateur boxing in Asia

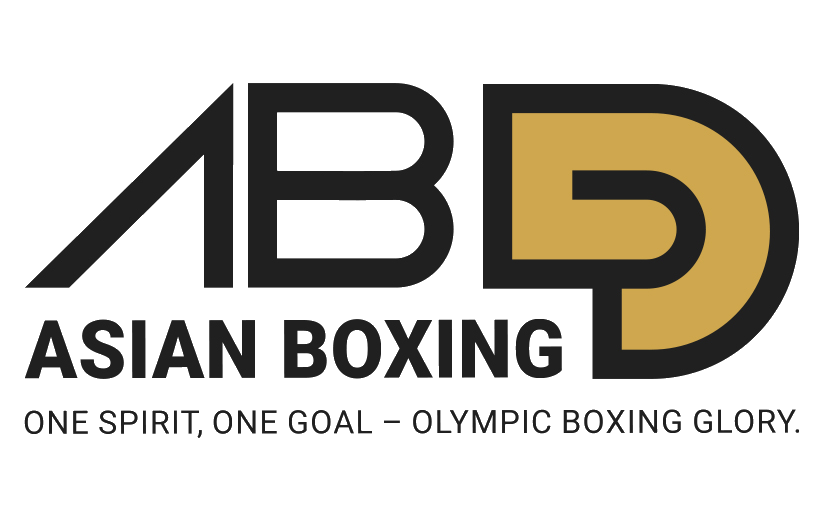
- Formation: 26 November 2024; 23 months ago
- Headquarters: Sindhorn Building, Tower 2, on 7th Floor 130-132 Wireless Road, Lumpini, Pathumwan, Bangkok 10330 Thailand
- Location: Bangkok, Thailand
- Region served: Asia
- Members: 32 national federations (Aug 2025)
- President: (Thailand) Pichai Chunhavajira
- Affiliations: World Boxing
- Website: asianboxing.org

Asian Boxing is the continental federation for amateur boxing in Asia organized under World Boxing. It was established on November 26, 2024, after the Asian Boxing Confederation (ASBC) held a meeting to decide on its affiliation with International Boxing Association (IBA). The majority of ASBC members voted to remain part of the IBA. ASBC President Pichai Chunhavajira resigned after the meeting to head the new federation.

== Events ==
- Asian Boxing Elite Boxing Championships
- Asian Boxing U19 & U22 Boxing Championships
- Asian Boxing U15 & U17 Boxing Championships
- Asian Youth Games

== Members ==
- Afghanistan (Afghanistan Boxing Federation)
- Bhutan (Bhutan Boxing Federation)
- Cambodia (Cambodia Boxing Federation)
- China (Chinese Boxing Federation)
- Chinese Taipei (Chinese Taipei Boxing Association)
- Hong Kong (Boxing Association of Hong Kong, China)
- India (Boxing Federation of India)
- Indonesia (Indonesian Boxing Federation)
- Iran (Iran Boxing Federation)
- Iraq (Iraqi Boxing Federation)
- Japan (Japan Boxing Federation)
- Jordan (Jordan Amateur Boxing Association)
- Kazakhstan (Kazakhstan Boxing Federation)
- Kyrgyzstan (National Boxing Federation of Kyrgyz Republic)
- Laos (Lao Boxing Federation)
- Lebanon (Lebanese Boxing Federation)
- (Macau) Macao (Macao Boxing General Association)
- Malaysia (Malaysia Boxing Federation)
- Mongolia (Mongolian Boxing Federation)
- Myanmar (Myanmar Boxing Federation)
- Nepal (Nepal Boxing Federation)
- Pakistan (Pakistan Boxing Federation)
- Palestine (Palestine Boxing Federation)
- Philippines (Association of Boxing Alliances in the Philippines)
- Saudi Arabia (Saudi Boxing Federation)
- Singapore (Singapore Boxing Federation)
- South Korea (Boxing Association of Korea)
- Syria (Syrian Arab Boxing Association)
- Thailand (Thailand Boxing Association)
- Turkmenistan (Turkmenistan Boxing Federation)
- United Arab Emirates (United Arab Emirates Boxing Federation)
- Uzbekistan (Uzbekistan Boxing Federation)

== Executive Committee ==
Position	Name
President	(Thailand) Pichai Chunhavajira
Secretary General	(Jordan) Ali Salameh
General Manager	(Egypt) Bassam Ghanem

== See also ==
- World Boxing
