= 2016 World Series (disambiguation) =

2016 World Series may refer to:

- 2016 Major League Baseball World Series
- 2016 Little League World Series (baseball)
- 2016 Intermediate League World Series (baseball)
- 2016 Junior League World Series (baseball)
- 2016 Senior League World Series (baseball)
- 2016 Big League World Series (baseball)
- 2016 College World Series (baseball)
- 2016 World Club Series (rugby league)
- 2016 World Series of Boxing
- 2016 World Series of Poker
- 2016 Fast5 Netball World Series
- 2016 PSA World Series (men's squash)
- 2015–16 America's Cup World Series (sailing)
