= Abrorjon Kodirov =

Uzbekistani boxer

Abror Kodirov
Personal information
- Nationality: Uzbekistan
- Born: 11 February 1995 (age 31)
- Height: 165 cm (5 ft 5 in)
- Weight: Flyweight; Bantamweight

Boxing career
Medal record
Islamic Solidarity Games
| Bronze medal – third place | 2017 Baku | Flyweight |

Abrorjon Kodirov (uzb. Abrorjon Qodirov Qahramonjon ugli born 11 February 1995 in Kokand, Uzbekistan) is an Uzbek amateur boxer, who fights in bantam-flyweight categories. Kodirov is 2x National champion of Uzbekistan, fighter of Uzbek Tigers (WSB) and bronze medalist of Islamic Solidarity Games that held in Baku, Azerbaijan in 2017.

== Tournaments and results ==
Konakbayev Tournament 2014 Pavlodar, Kazakhstan 2nd

Golden Valley Tournament 2015 Tashkent, Uzbekistan 1st

Chinggis Khaan-Ulaanbaatar Cup 2016 Mongolia 2nd

Chemiepokal Halle, Germany 2015

Semi-finals: Defeated Beblik Ronny GER 2:1

Finals: Defeated Konki Elie FRA 2:1

Islamic Solidarity Games 2017

Round of 16: Defeated Masud Yusifzade AZE 4:1

Semifanls: Defeated by Abdelali Darra MAR 3:2

21st Umakhanov Memorial Tournament Kaspiysk, Russia 2019 - 1st

== World series of Boxing, Uzbek Tigers ==
Won Ceiber David Avila 3-0 Puerto Rico Hurricans 2016

Lost Yosbany Veitia 0-3 Cuba Domadores 2016

Won Vyacheslav Tashkarakov 3-0 Patriot Boxing Team Russia 2017

Won Chang Yong 3-0 China Dragons 2017
