= Shakhram Giyasov =

Uzbek boxer (born 1993)

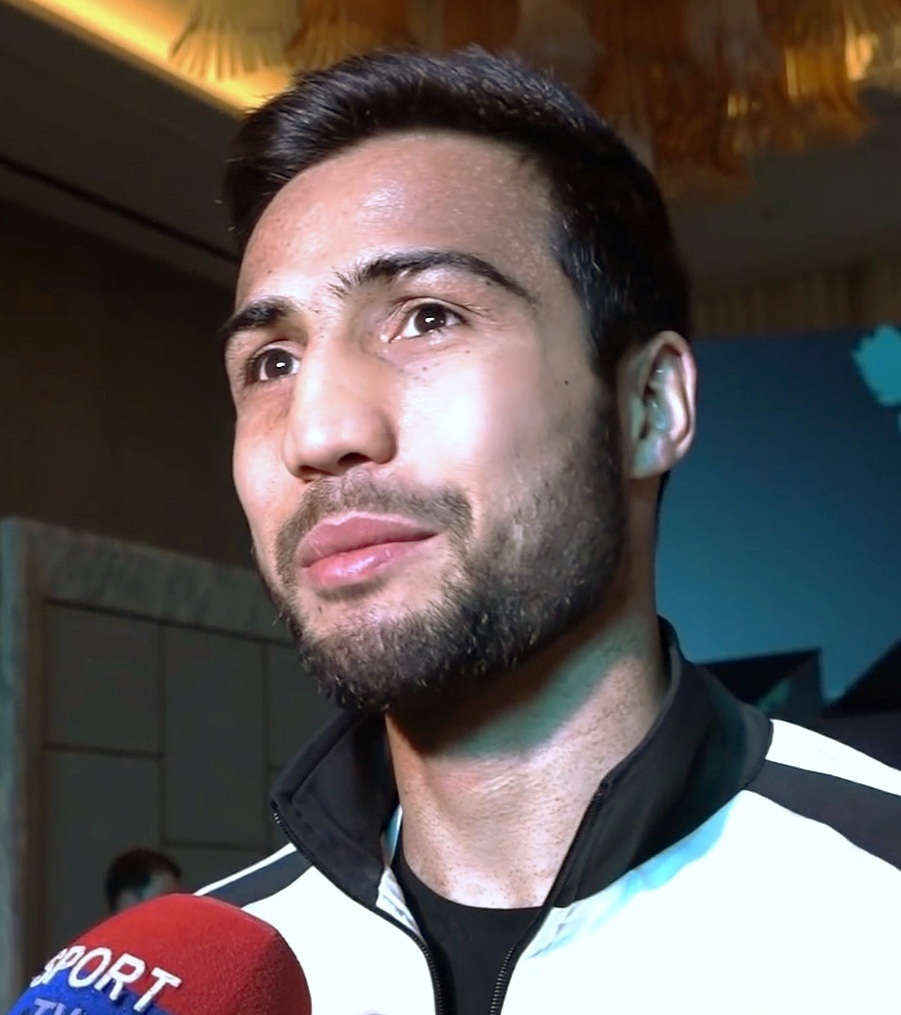
- Giyasov in 2021

Personal information
- Nickname: Wonder Boy
- Born: Shaxram Djamshedovich Giyasov; 7 July 1993 (age 33) Bukhara, Uzbekistan
- Height: 5 ft 9 1/2 in (177 cm)
- Weight: Light welterweight; Welterweight

Boxing career
- Stance: Orthodox

Boxing record
- Total fights: 18
- Wins: 17
- Win by KO: 10
- Losses: 1
Medal record
Men's Amateur boxing
Representing Uzbekistan
Olympic Games
Silver medal – second place	2016 Rio Janeiro	Welterweight
World Championships
Gold medal – first place	2017 Hamburg	Welterweight
Asian Championships
Gold medal – first place	2017 Tashkent	Welterweight

Shakhram Djamshedovich Giyasov (born 7 July 1993) is an Uzbek professional boxer. He has challenged once for the WBA (Regular) welterweight title in May 2026. As an amateur, he won a gold medal at the 2017 World Championships, and silver at the 2016 Olympics.

== Early life ==
Shakhram started boxing when he was 12 years old in Bukhara sport school under the trainers Olim Mukhammedov and Ravshan Khodjaev.

== Amateur career ==
=== Olympic result ===
Rio 2016

- Round of 32: Defeated Youba Sissokho (Spain) 3–0
- Round of 16: Defeated Eimantas Stanionis (Lithuania) 3–0
- Quarter-finals: Defeated Roniel Iglesias (Cuba) 3–0
- Semi-finals: Defeated Mohammed Rabii (Morocco) 3–0
- Final: Defeated by Daniyar Yeleussinov (Kazakhstan) 3–0

=== World Championships result ===
Hamburg 2017

- Round of 16: Defeated Yevhenii Barabanov (Ukraine) 5–0
- Quarter-finals: Defeated Pat McCormack (England) 5–0
- Semi-finals: Defeated Ablaikhan Zhussupov (Kazakhstan) 4–1
- Final: Defeated Roniel Iglesias (Cuba) 5–0

== Professional career ==
=== Early career ===
On 10 March 2018, Giyasov made his professional debut against Nicolas Atilio Velazquez of Argentina. Giyasov won the fight after knocking Velazquez out with a left hook to the body within the first minute of the opening round.

On 21 April 2018 Giyasov fought in his second professional fight, he was taken the distance by Gabor Gorbics on route to a unanimous decision win. He stated after the fight that “I was over excited because of the crowd, and I was rushing myself to get a KO. But it was a great experience though. I’m confident that today I would stop him without question”.

On 14 July 2018, Giyasov gained his second knockout win by defeating Daniel Echeverria in the opening round. Giyasov hit Echeverria with a strong body shot which dropped the Mexican fighter, referee Raul Caiz Sr proceeded to stop the fight despite protests from the corner of Echeverria.

Giyasov's fourth professional fight was against Albert Mensah on 17 August 2018. In the third round, Giyasov landed a combination of punches to the body and head of Mensah which put the Ghanaian on the canvas. Giyasov was declared the winner after Mensah was unable to get up before the count of ten.

On 22 September 2018, Giyasov fought against the undefeated Nicaraguan Julio Laguna on the undercard of Anthony Joshua vs. Alexander Povetkin. Despite the initial toughness of Laguna, Giyasov slowly wore down his opponent with a barrage of punches and knocked Laguna out with a right hook to the head during the fourth round.

On 24 November 2018, Giyasov fought against the experienced Mexican Miguel Zamudio. Giyasov dropped his opponent with a left hook seconds into the opening round and repeatedly managed to hit Zamudio. Eventually Giyasov hit Zamudio with a barrage of punches which resulted in his opponent dropping to the canvas for a second time in the opening round, following the second knock down, referee David Fields stopped the fight.

Giyasov's seventh professional fight was against Edgar Puerta on 23 February 2019. Giyasov won via fifth round technical knockout after hitting Puerta with several heavy blows.

On 25 April 2019, it was announced that Giyasov had signed a contract with Matchroom Sport where he would be promoted by Eddie Hearn.

On 26 April 2019, Giyasov was taken the distance for just the second time in his professional career when he fought Emanuel Taylor over ten rounds. Giyasov was hurt in both the first and fourth rounds and this resulted in him been forced to clinch Taylor. Giyasov started to control the middle rounds and hurt Taylor in the ninth round and despite a close final round, Giyasov was announced as the winner via unanimous decision.

=== Rise up the ranks ===
==== Giyasov vs. Perez ====
On 24 August 2019, Giyasov fought former WBA lightweight champion Darleys Pérez in what was expected to be Giyasov's most difficult fight to date of his professional career. Giyasov knocked Pérez out within the first thirty seconds of the opening round after hitting his opponent cleanly with a left hook to the head. Pérez hesitantly got to his feet before referee Francisco Laveaga stopped the fight.

Almost a year after his last fight, Giyasov returned to the ring against Wiston Campos on 15 August 2020. After dominating the opening two rounds, Giyasov put his opponent on the canvas after landing a heavy left hook to the body of Campos at the end of the third round. Giyasov was declared the winner after Campos was unable to get up before the count of ten.

On 3 April 2021, Giyasov fought in his home nation of Uzbekistan for the first time as a professional. The bout would take place in the nations capital Tashkent, against Patricio Lopez Moreno. Giyasov started the fight aggressively and at the end of the second round, landed a combination of punches which momentarily put Moreno on the canvas. Moreno managed to recover from the knockdown, however Giyasov continued pressurising his Mexican opponent and with just under a minute of the third round remaining, connected with a heavy right hand to the head which put Moreno on the canvas for the second time. This resulted in referee Andriy Baliasov ending the bout after Moreno couldn’t recover before the count of ten.

On 17 December 2021, Giyasov fought against Cristian Rafael Coria. During the second round, Coria appeared to knock Giyasov down, however this wasn’t ruled a knockdown by the referee. Giyasov won via unanimous decision, 100-90, 99-91 and 99-91 on the scorecards, after controlling the remainder of the bout.

==== Giyasov vs. Gomez ====
Giyasov fought against Christian Gomez on the undercard of Canelo Álvarez vs. Dmitry Bivol on 7 May 2022. In the fourth round, Giyasov landed a left hook which put his opponent on the canvas. During the seventh round, Giyasov knocked Gomez down for a second time after landing a short right uppercut. Gomez managed to recover from the knockdown and towards the end of the seventh round, landed a right hand which appeared to visibly hurt Giyasov. In the final round, Giyasov knocked Gomez down for a third time after landing another right uppercut. Gomez got off the canvas for a third time and was able to make it to the end of the bout. Giyasov was announced as the winner via wide unanimous decision, 99-88, 98-89 and 99-88 on the scorecards.

=== WBC (Regular) welterweight title challenge ===
==== Giyasov vs. Catterall ====
Giyasov faced Jack Catterall for the vacant WBA (Regular) welterweight title at the Pyramids of Giza in Egypt on 23 May 2026. He was knocked to the canvas in the first round and went on to lose the fight via unanimous decision, bringing an end to his unbeaten professional record.

== Professional boxing record ==
18 fights	17 wins	1 loss
By knockout	10	0
By decision	7	1

No.	Result	Record	Opponent	Type	Round, time	Date	Location	Notes
18	Loss	17–1	Jack Catterall	UD	12	23 May 2026	Pyramids of Giza, Giza, Egypt	For vacant WBA (Regular) welterweight title
17	Win	17–0	Franco Ocampo	KO	4 (10), 1:57	12 Apr 2025	Boardwalk Hall, Atlantic City, New Jersey, US	
16	Win	16–0	Miguel Parra	SD	10	31 Jul 2024	Santa Monica Pier, Santa Monica, California, US	
15	Win	15–0	Pablo César Cano	TD	11 (12)	24 Feb 2024	Caribe Royale, Orlando, Florida, US	
14	Win	14–0	Harold Calderon	UD	12	17 Jun 2023	Smoothie King Center, New Orleans, Louisiana, US	
13	Win	13–0	Christian Gomez	UD	10	7 May 2022	T-Mobile Arena, Paradise, Nevada, US	Won vacant IBF North American welterweight title
12	Win	12–0	Cristian Rafael Coria	UD	10	17 Dec 2021	Hotel Renaissance, Tashkent, Uzbekistan	
11	Win	11–0	Patricio Lopez Moreno	KO	3 (10), 2:21	3 Apr 2021	Humo Arena, Tashkent, Uzbekistan	Retained WBA International light-welterweight title
10	Win	10–0	Wiston Campos	KO	3 (10), 3:00	15 Aug 2020	Downtown streets, Tulsa, Oklahoma, US	
9	Win	9–0	Darleys Pérez	TKO	1 (10), 0:30	24 Aug 2019	Centro de Usos Multiples, Hermosillo, Mexico	Retained WBA International light-welterweight title
8	Win	8–0	Emanuel Taylor	UD	10	26 Apr 2019	The Forum, Inglewood, California, US	Won vacant WBA International light-welterweight title
7	Win	7–0	Edgar Puerta	TKO	5 (6), 2:54	23 Feb 2019	Auditorio Fausto Gutierrez Moreno, Tijuana, Mexico	
6	Win	6–0	Miguel Zamudio	TKO	1 (6), 2:41	24 Nov 2018	Hard Rock Live, Atlantic City, New Jersey, US	
5	Win	5–0	Julio Laguna	TKO	4 (6), 0:38	22 Sep 2018	Wembley Stadium, London, England	
4	Win	4–0	Albert Mensah	KO	3 (8), 1:56	17 Aug 2018	Fantasy Springs Resort Casino, Indio, California, US	
3	Win	3–0	Daniel Echeverria	KO	1 (6), 1:11	14 Jul 2018	Florentine Gardens, Los Angeles, California, US	
2	Win	2–0	Gabor Gorbics	UD	6	21 Apr 2018	Kings Theatre, New York City, New York, US	
1	Win	1–0	Nicolas Atilio Velazquez	KO	1 (6), 0:15	10 Mar 2018	Kings Theatre, New York City, New York, US	

== See also ==
- List of male boxers

Sporting positions
Regional boxing titles
Vacant Title last held by Shohjahon Ergashev	WBA International light-welterweight champion 26 April 2019 – March 2022; Vacated	Vacant Title next held by Sandor Martin
Vacant Title last held by Mikaël Zewski	IBF North American welterweight champion 7 May 2022 – 2025; Vacated	Vacant Title next held by Ricardo Adan Salas Rodriguez
