= Boxing at the 2017 Islamic Solidarity Games =

Boxing competitions

- Venue: Baku Sports Hall
- Dates: 12–18 May 2017

Boxing at the 2017 Islamic Solidarity Games was held in Baku Crystal Hall 2, Azerbaijan from 12 to 18 May 2017.

== Medal table ==
Rank	Nation	Gold	Silver	Bronze	Total
1	Azerbaijan	3	3	1	7
2	Uzbekistan	3	0	2	5
3	Kazakhstan	2	0	3	5
4	Syria	1	1	2	4
5	Turkmenistan	1	1	1	3
6	Iraq	0	2	0	2
7	Morocco	0	1	3	4
8	Egypt	0	1	1	2
8	Turkey	0	1	1	2
10	Jordan	0	0	3	3
11	Algeria	0	0	1	1
11	Cameroon	0	0	1	1
11	Iran	0	0	1	1
Totals (13 entries)		10	10	20	40

== Medalists ==
Event	Gold	Silver	Bronze
Light flyweight 49 kg	Hussin Al-Masri; Syria	Hasan Ali; Iraq	Omid Ahmadi Safa; Iran
Light flyweight 49 kg	Hussin Al-Masri; Syria	Hasan Ali; Iraq	Mironshokh Ibragimov; Uzbekistan
Flyweight; 52 kg	Azat Mahmetov; Kazakhstan	Abdelali Daraa; Morocco	Oussama Mordjane; Algeria
Flyweight; 52 kg	Azat Mahmetov; Kazakhstan	Abdelali Daraa; Morocco	Abrorjon Kodirov; Uzbekistan
Bantamweight; 56 kg	Abdulkhay Sharakhmatov; Uzbekistan	Ýakub Meredow; Turkmenistan	Mohammad Al-Wadi; Jordan
Bantamweight; 56 kg	Abdulkhay Sharakhmatov; Uzbekistan	Ýakub Meredow; Turkmenistan	Tayfur Aliyev; Azerbaijan
Lightweight; 60 kg	Javid Chalabiyev; Azerbaijan	Ammar Jabbar; Iraq	Sultan Zaurbek; Kazakhstan
Lightweight; 60 kg	Javid Chalabiyev; Azerbaijan	Ammar Jabbar; Iraq	Hursand Imankuliýew; Turkmenistan
Light welterweight 64 kg	Aliyor Noraliev; Uzbekistan	Eslam El-Gendy; Egypt	Kuan Kuatov; Kazakhstan
Light welterweight 64 kg	Aliyor Noraliev; Uzbekistan	Eslam El-Gendy; Egypt	Obada Al-Kasbeh; Jordan
Welterweight; 69 kg	Bobo-Usmon Baturov; Uzbekistan	Tamerlan Abdullayev; Azerbaijan	Ilya Ochkin; Kazakhstan
Welterweight; 69 kg	Bobo-Usmon Baturov; Uzbekistan	Tamerlan Abdullayev; Azerbaijan	Ahmad Ghossoun; Syria
Middleweight; 75 kg	Tursynbay Kulahmet; Kazakhstan	Kamran Shakhsuvarly; Azerbaijan	Wilfried Ntsengue; Cameroon
Middleweight; 75 kg	Tursynbay Kulahmet; Kazakhstan	Kamran Shakhsuvarly; Azerbaijan	Youness Gharroumi; Morocco
Light heavyweight 81 kg	Arslanbek Açilow; Turkmenistan	Rauf Rahimov; Azerbaijan	Cem Karlıdağ; Turkey
Light heavyweight 81 kg	Arslanbek Açilow; Turkmenistan	Rauf Rahimov; Azerbaijan	Abdelrahman Oraby; Egypt
Heavyweight; 91 kg	Teymur Mammadov; Azerbaijan	Burak Aksın; Turkey	Alaaeddin Ghossoun; Syria
Heavyweight; 91 kg	Teymur Mammadov; Azerbaijan	Burak Aksın; Turkey	Abdeljalil Abouhamda; Morocco
Super heavyweight +91 kg	Magomedrasul Majidov; Azerbaijan	Manaf Asaad; Syria	Mohamed Arjaoui; Morocco
Super heavyweight +91 kg	Magomedrasul Majidov; Azerbaijan	Manaf Asaad; Syria	Hussein Ishaish; Jordan
