= 2012–13 World Series of Boxing =

Boxing competition

- Date: November 2012–May 2013
- Teams: 12

Champion
- (Kazakhstan) Astana Arlans ($500,000)

The 2012–13 World Series of Boxing was the third edition of the World Series of Boxing since its establishment in 2010 and ran from November 2012 to May 2013. The event was organized by the International Boxing Association (AIBA). The twelve teams, divided into two groups of six, contain a majority of boxers from the country in which they are based along with a smaller number of overseas boxers. The Team final bouts were hosted in Astana, Kazakhstan.

The 2012-13 World Series of Boxing was the first season to feature a knockout stage, with the top four teams from each group advancing to the quarterfinals. Additionally, the British Lionhearts finished the regular season with a perfect record of 10 wins out of 10 matches, becoming the first team in World Series of Boxing history to achieve this feat. The Cuba Domadores won the team championship, defeating the defending champions, the Dynamo Moscow, 6-4 in the final.

== Competition format ==
Each team competes in home and fixtures against the others in their group. The top four teams from each group will qualify for the knock-out stages. The quarter and semi-finals will also take place on a home and away basis but the final will be held at a neutral venue over two days. Each fixture consists of five fights (five rounds of three minutes) at the following weights:

- Heavyweight (91+ kg)
- Light heavyweight (80 – 85 kg)
- Middleweight (68 – 73 kg)
- Lightweight (57 – 61 kg)
- Bantamweight (50 – 54 kg)

The points are attributed as follows:

- If the score is 5-0, 4-1, 4-0, 3-0, 3-1, 2-0 or 1-0: the winning team will get three points and the losing team will get zero points
- If score 3-2 or 2-1: the winning team will get three points and the losing team will get one point
- In the case of a draw each team will get two points

== Group standings ==
=== Group A ===
Team	Pts	Matches			Bouts				
Team	Pts	Pld	W	L	Pld	W	L	TD	WO
Mexico Guerreros	6	2	2	0	10	8	2	0	0
Azerbaijan Baku Fires	6	2	2	0	10	8	2	0	0
Russia	4	2	1	1	10	7	3	0	0
Hussars Poland	3	2	1	1	10	4	6	0	0
Algeria Desert Hawks	0	2	0	2	10	2	8	0	1
Argentina Condors	0	2	0	2	10	1	9	0	0

=== Group B ===
Team	Pts	Matches			Bouts				
Team	Pts	Pld	W	L	Pld	W	L	TD	WO
(United Kingdom) British Lionhearts	6	2	2	0	10	8	2	0	0
Astana Arlans Kazakhstan	6	2	2	0	10	8	2	0	0
(Germany) German Eagles	4	2	1	1	10	5	5	0	0
(Italy) Dolce & Gabbana Italia Thunder	3	2	1	1	10	4	6	0	0
Ukraine Otamans	2	2	0	2	10	4	6	0	0
(United States) USA Knockouts	-1	2	0	2	10	1	9	0	1

== Draft ==
A 118 fighters enters the International boxers draft with just 27 being picked by the teams.

Team	Boxer	Division
Argentina Condors	Isaia Mena (COL)	91+
Hussars Poland	Magomed Abdulhamidov (AZE)	54
United States	Michael Conlan (IRE)	54
Germany Eagles	Răzvan Andreiana (ROU)	54
India Fighters	Siphiwe Lusizi (RSA)	73
Mexico Guerreros	Jose David Payares Julio (VEN)	91+
Kazakhstan Astana Arlans	Mihai Nistor (ROU)	91+
Azerbaijan Baku Fires	Elshod Rasulov (UZB)	85
Milano Thunder	Abdulkadir Abullayev (AZE)	91+
Hussars Poland	Sergei Kuzmin (BLR)	85
United States	Sean Turner (IRE)	91+
Germany Eagles	Nordine Oubaali (FRA)	54
India Fighters	Mohamed Arjaoui (MAR)	91+
Mexico Guerreros	Sardor Abullaev (UZB)	91+
Kazakhstan Astana Arlans	Tyrone McCullagh (IRE)	54
Azerbaijan Baku Fires	Jaba Khositashvili (GEO)	73
Germany Eagles	Bahram Muzaffer (TUR)	85
India Fighters	Ahmed Barki (MAR)	85
Mexico Guerreros	Jason Quigley (IRL)	73
Kazakhstan Astana Arlans	Ainar Karlson (EST)	85
Milano Thunder	Bojan Miskovic (CRO)	85
United States	Kennedy Katende (SWE)	85
India Fighters	Ngoula Tangoum Romarick (CMR)	91+
Mexico Guerreros	Conrad Cummings (UK)	73
Kazakhstan Astana Arlans	Ehsan Rouzbahani (IRN)	85
Kazakhstan Astana Arlans	Eric Donovan (IRE)	61
Mexico Guerreros	Juan Carlos Rodríguez (VEN)	73
