= 2010–11 World Series of Boxing =

Boxing competition

The 2010–11 World Series of Boxing is the inaugural edition of the World Series of Boxing. The event is organised by the International Boxing Association (AIBA).

== Competition format ==
=== WSB regular season ===
The competition format consists of a team competition and an individual program. Teams of a minimum of 10 boxers represented 12 cities in three regional conferences: Asia, Europe and the Americas.

WSB matches consist of:

- 5 weight categories: bantam, light, middle, light heavy and heavy
- 5 bouts per match
- 5 rounds of 3 minutes per bout
- Manual scoring

These teams competed in three conferences (Asia, Europe and the Americas) in the regular season, with the top team in each conference, plus the best runner-up from the conferences, qualifying for the play-offs.

The WSB season concludes with Individual Championships between the two top boxers in the individual ranking in each weight category at the end of the regular season. The WSB Individual Champions receive the titleholder's belt, 20000 US dollars in prize money and a qualification place for the London 2012 Summer Olympics

== Teams ==
In its inaugural season, the World Series of Boxing consisted of 12 teams that spanned the globe.

- (Kazakhstan) Astana Arlans
- (Azerbaijan) Baku Fires
- (China) Beijing Dragons
- (Italy) Dolce & Gabbana Milano Thunder
- (Turkey) Istanbulls
- (United States) Los Angeles Matadors
- (United States) Memphis Force
- Mexico Guerreros
- (United States) Miami Gallos
- (Russia) Moscow Kremlin Bears
- (France) Paris United
- (South Korea) Pohang Poseidons

== Group stage ==
=== American Conference ===
Team	Pts	Matches				Bouts				
Team	Pts	Total	Wins	Draws	Losses	Total	Wins	TD	Losses	W/O
(United States) Los Angeles Matadors	25	12	8	0	4	60	40	0	20	0
Mexico Guerreros	25	12	8	0	4	60	36	0	24	0
(United States) Miami Gallos	14	12	4	0	8	60	23	0	37	0
(United States) Memphis Force	14	12	4	0	8	60	21	0	39	0

== Pools ==
Pool A (American Conference)

Team	Pts	Matches			Bouts			
Team	Pts	W	L	Pld	W	L	TD	Pld
(United States) Los Angeles Matadors	25	8	4	12	40	20	0	60
Mexico City Guerreros	25	8	4	12	36	24	0	60
(United States) Miami Gallos	14	4	8	12	23	37	0	60
(United States) Memphis Force	14	4	8	12	21	39	0	60

Pool B (Asian Conference)

Team	Pts	Matches			Bouts			
Team	Pts	W	L	Pld	W	L	TD	Pld
(Azerbaijan) Baku Fires	31	10	2	12	41	19	0	60
(Kazakhstan) Astana Arlans	29	9	3	12	44	16	0	60
(China) Beijing Dragons	11	3	9	12	16	44	0	60
(South Korea) Pohang Poseidons	11	2	10	12	19	41	0	60

Pool C (European Conference)

Team	Pts	Matches			Bouts			
Team	Pts	W	L	Pld	W	L	TD	Pld
(France) Paris United	29	9	3	12	39	20	1	60
(Italy) Dolce & Gabbana Milano Thunders	27	8	4	12	36	22	2	60
(Turkey) Istanbulls	16	4	8	12	25	34	1	60
(Russia) Moscow Kremlin Bears	12	3	9	12	17	41	2	60
