= 2017 World Series of Boxing =

Boxing competitions

The 2017 World Series of Boxing was the seventh edition of the World Series of Boxing since its establishment in 2010. It was held from February 3 to May 15 of 2017. The event was organised by the International Boxing Association (AIBA). The twelve teams, divided into three groups of four, contain a majority of boxers from the country in which they are based along with a smaller number of overseas boxers.

Astana Arlans earn third World Series of Boxing title.

== Teams ==
- Argentina Condors
- (Kazakhstan) Astana Arlans
- (United Kingdom) British Lionhearts
- Caciques de Venezuela
- China Dragons
- Colombia Heroicos
- Cuba Domadores
- France Fighting Roosters
- (Italy) Italia Thunder
- Morocco Atlas Lions
- (Russia) Patriot Boxing Team
- (Uzbekistan) Uzbek Tigers

== Group stage ==
=== Group A ===
Team	Pts	Matches				Bouts				
Team	Pts	Total	Wins	Draws	Losses	Total	Wins	TD	Losses	W/O
Cuba Domadores										
Colombia Heroicos										
Caciques Venezuela										
Argentina Condors										

=== Group B ===
Team	Pts	Matches				Bouts				
Team	Pts	Total	Wins	Draws	Losses	Total	Wins	TD	Losses	W/O
(United Kingdom) British Lionhearts										
(Italy) Italia Thunder										
France Fighting Roosters										
Morocco Atlas Lions										

=== Group C ===
Team	Pts	Matches				Bouts				
Team	Pts	Total	Wins	Draws	Losses	Total	Wins	TD	Losses	W/O
(Kazakhstan) Astana Arlans										
(Russia) Patriot Boxing Team										
(Uzbekistan) Uzbek Tigers										
China Dragons										

== Play-offs ==
Quarterfinals
A1	Cuba Domadores	2	5	7
C3	(Uzbekistan) Uzbek Tigers	3	0	3
A2	Colombia Heroicos	2	4	6
B2	(Italy) Italia Thunder	3	1	4
B1	(United Kingdom) British Lionhearts	2	4	6
B3	France Fighting Roosters	3	2	5
C1	(Kazakhstan) Astana Arlans	3	4	7
C2	(Russia) Patriot Boxing Team	2	1	3

Semifinals
A1	Cuba Domadores	2	5	7
A2	Colombia Heroicos	3	0	3
B1	(United Kingdom) British Lionhearts	1	2	3
C1	(Kazakhstan) Astana Arlans	4	3	7

Finals
A1	Cuba Domadores	3	2	5
C1	(Kazakhstan) Astana Arlans	2	4	6
