= Harold Calderon =

Professional Boxer

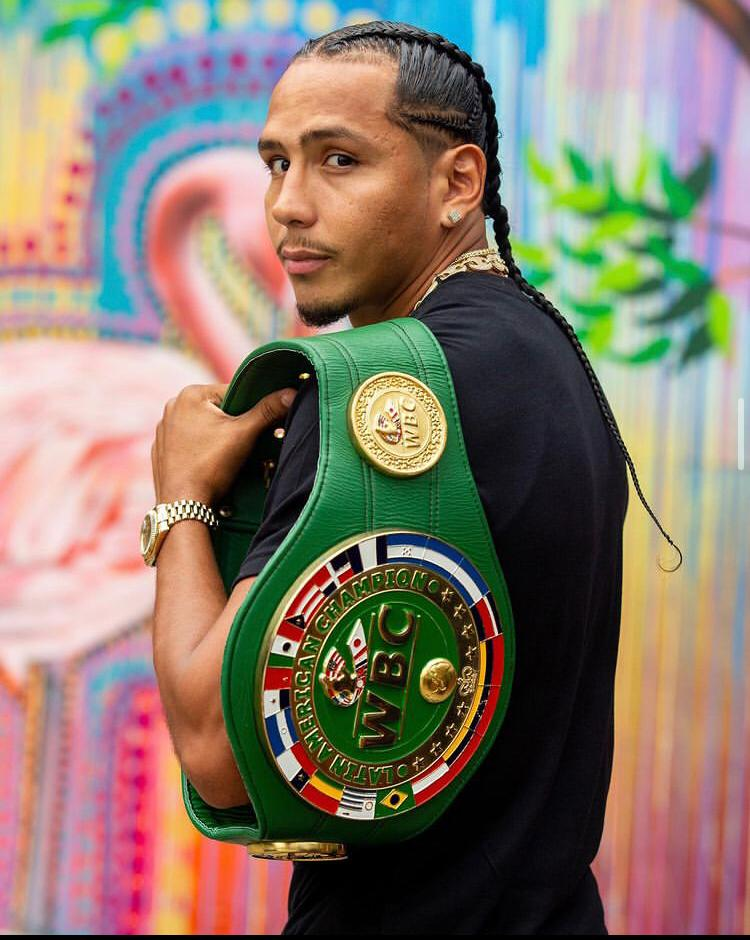
- Harold Calderon

Personal information
- Nickname: King
- Born: June 23, 1987 (age 39) Chicago, Illinois, U.S
- Height: 5 ft 11 in (180 cm)

Boxing career
- Weight class: Welterweight; Super Welterweight
- Reach: 73in (187 cm)
- Stance: Southpaw

Boxing record
- Total fights: 27
- Win by KO: 18
- Losses: 1

Harold Calderon (born June 23, 1987) is an American professional boxer who competes in the Super Welterweight division. He is currently ranked as the 11th boxer by the WBA and 14th by the IBF in the respective weight class.

== Early life and amateur career ==
Harold Calderon was born in Chicago to Honduran immigrants who arrived in the United States in the late 1980s. When he was five years old, his family moved to Miami, where he was introduced to the City of Miami's PAL boxing program.

He achieved a record of 65 wins (ranked #1) and won a silver medal at the 2013 Central American Games.

On October 23, 2021, Calderon fought against Luis Eduardo Florez, who was disqualified after biting Calderon during the match.

Calderon had a run of 27 undefeated wins with 18 knockouts and was defeated for the first time on June 17, 2023, by Shakhram Giyasov.

== Professional career ==
Calderon is scheduled to face Eric Tudor in Las Vegas on November 2, 2024.

== Professional boxing record ==
28 fights	27 wins	1 loss
By knockout	18	0
By decision	9	1

No.	Result	Record	Opponent	Type	Rounds, Time	Date	Location	Notes
28	Loss	27–1	Shakhram Giyasov	UD		17-Jun-23	Smoothie King Center, New Orleans, Louisiana	
27	Win	27–0	Ezequiel Victor Fernandez	TKO	3 (8), 1:13	23-Sep-22	Doubletree Miamimart Hotel, Miami, U.S.	
26	Win	26–0	Luis Eduardo Florez	DQ	6 (10), 2:37	23-Oct-21	Convention Center, Tampa, U.S.	
25	Win	25–0	Ramal Amanov	TKO	4 (10), 2:59	19-Jun-21	Doubletree Miamimart Hotel, Miami, U.S.	
24	Win	24–0	Jonathan Jose Eniz	UD	10 (10)	20-Feb-21	Doubletree Miamimart Hotel, Miami, U.S.	
23	Win	23–0	Gustavo David Vittori	KO	4 (10), 3:00	21-Nov-20	Bryan Glazer Family JCC Auditorium, Tampa, U.S	
22	Win	22–0	Krisztian Santa	TKO	2 (10), 1:11	13-Dec-19	Florida National Armory, Miramar, U.S	
21	Win	21–0	Diego Vicente Perez	TKO	1 (10), 1:46	26-Jul-19	Miccosukee Indian Gaming Resort, Miami, U.S.	
20	Win	20–0	Marcelo Fabian Bzowski	KO	9 (10), 1:41	24-May-19	Miccosukee Indian Gaming Resort, Miami, U.S.	
19	Win	19–0	Carlos Winston	TKO	5 (10), 2:51	22-Mar-19	Miccosukee Indian Gaming Resort, Miami, U.S.	
18	Win	18–0	Emiliano Martin Garcia	KO	7 (8), 1:11	10-Nov-18	Miami-Dade County Fair & Expo, Miami, U.S.	
17	Win	17–0	John David Martinez	UD	10 (10)	6-Jul-18	Seminole Hard Rock Hotel and Casino, Hollywood, U.S.	
16	Win	16–0	Ronald Montes	TKO	3 (6), 2:59	23-Mar-18	Seminole Hard Rock Hotel and Casino, Hollywood, U.S.	
15	Win	15–0	Ariel Vasquez	UD	8 (8)	8-Dec-17	Hialeah Park Racing & Casino, Hialeah, U.S.	
14	Win	14–0	Elvin De la Rosa	TKO	3 (8), 2:16	15-Jul-17	Polideportivo Castillo, San Francisco de Macoris, U.S.	
13	Win	13–0	Wilfrido Buelvas	KO	3 (8), 0:44	17-Jun-17	Miami Airport Convention Center, Miami, U.S.	
12	Win	12–0	Elvin Perez	UD	6 (6)	11-Nov-16	Miami Airport Convention Center, Miami, U.S.	
11	Win	11–0	Lionel Jimenez	RTD	2 (6), 2:00	17-Sep-16	El Nuevo Rodeo, Minneapolis, U.S.	
10	Win	10–0	Marteze Logan	TKO	4 (6)	9-Jul-16	Derby Park Expo, Louisville, U.S.	
9	Win	9–0	Javier Garcia	UD	4 (4)	31-Jan-16	Seminole Casino, Immokalee, U.S.	
8	Win	8–0	Clifford McPherson	TKO	1 (4), 1:29	21-Nov-15	El Nuevo Rodeo, Minneapolis, U.S.	
7	Win	7–0	Ash Majok	KO	2 (6), 0:48	12-Sep-15	El Nuevo Rodeo, Minneapolis, U.S.	
6	Win	6–0	Joselito Del Rosario	UD	4 (4)	6-Mar-15	Casa de los Clubes, Santo Domingo, U.S.	
5	Win	5–0	Damion Hill	MD	4 (4)	14-Nov-14	Grandma's Sports Garden, Duluth, U.S.	
4	Win	4–0	Miguel Romero	KO	2 (6), 2:33	18-Aug-14	Barrio Chiquinquira, Barranquilla, U.S.	
3	Win	3–0	Raidy Martinez Rodriguez	TKO	2 (4), 2:46	1-Jun-14	Coliseo Pedro Julio Nolasco, La Romana, U.S.	
2	Win	2–0	Luis Batista	TKO	2 (4), 1:40	22-Mar-14	Club Maquiteria, Santo Domingo, U.S.	
1	Win	1–0	Joel Cassiani	UD	4 (4)	1-Nov-13	Patio Casa Los Caracoles, Santiago de Tolu, U.S.	

== Personal life ==
Calderon is married to his wife and they have three children.
