= Astana Dakar Team =

Kazakh rally raid team

Astana Dakar Team logo

The Astana Dakar Team are the rally raid team, competes in the multiple rally raid races and in the Dakar Rally. The team participated in cars and trucks classes. They were founded in 2011 to develop the brand Astana, as the part of the Astana Presidential Club.
