= Ravshan Khodjaev =

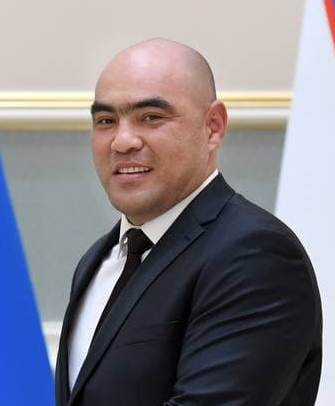
- Born: 16 January 1980 (age 46); Bukhara, Uzbekistan
- Education: Bachelor
- Alma mater: Bukhara State University
- Occupation: Boxing trainer
- Employer: Uzbekistan Boxing Federation
- Title: Honored Coach of the Republic of Uzbekistan; The Order of the Dustlik

Ravshan Khodjaev (ру: Равшан Ходжаев, Uzbek: Xodjaev Ravshan Ilxanovich; born January 16, 1980, Bukhara, Uzbek SSR, USSR) is a senior coach of the national boxing team of Uzbekistan from 2016 to 2023. Starting October, 2023 he started operating as a Head coach of the Azerbaijan National Boxing Team. He holds the honorary title "Honored Coach of Uzbekistan", the Order of Dustlik and the winner of the international Golden Mongoose Award.

== Biography ==
Since 2016 he has been working as a senior coach of the national boxing team of Uzbekistan, worked in a semi-professional The Uzbek Tigers team before the closure of the club, as a coach, participated many times in the Olympic Games, world championships, and Asia. He trained boxers as the silver medalist of the Olympic Games in Rio de Janeiro, and the 2017 world champion in Germany (Hamburg) Shakhram Giyasov, Elnur Abduraimov, the champion of the Olympic Games in Rio Zoirov Shahobiddin, prepared for fights world champions Shakhram Giyasov and IBA World Boxing Championships silver medalist Saidjamshid Jafarov.

== Awards ==
- Honored Coach of the Republic of Uzbekistan
- The Order of the Dustlik
- Golden Mongoose
