= Salle Mohammed V =

Sporting arena in Casablanca, Morocco

Coordinates: 33.580715°N 7.645363°W

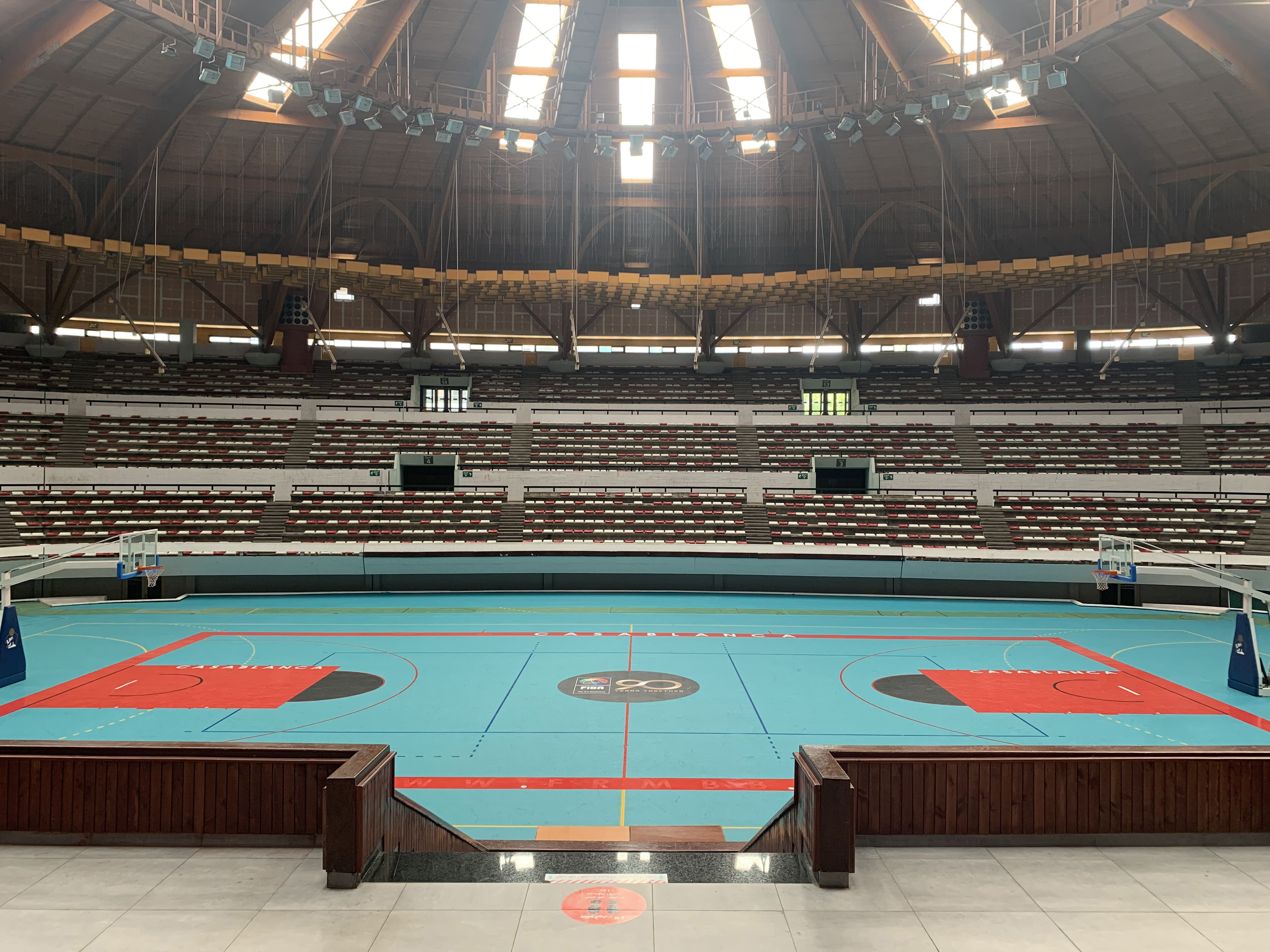
- Interactive map of Salle Mohammed V
- Full name: Salle Omnisports Mohammed V
- Location: Casablanca, Morocco
- Capacity: 12,000

Construction
- Opened: 1981; 45 years ago

Salle Mohamed V is an indoor sporting arena located in Casablanca, Morocco. The capacity of the arena is 12,000 people.

August 2024 saw the gaming event “Free Fire: Battle of Morocco” being held there with 12 teams and 4000 fans in attendance.

== See also ==
- Stade Mohammed V
