= Chinese Boxing Federation =

The Chinese Boxing Federation (CBF, Chinese: 中国拳击协会) is a national sports non-profit organization that was established in 1986. It is under the supervision of the State General Administration of Sports and is dedicated to the promotion of the technical advancement and popularization of boxing.

== History ==
Deng Xiaoping stated that "boxing can also be a channel to enhance the understanding and friendship between the people of China and the U.S." during Muhammad Ali's inaugural visit to China in December 1979. The Chinese Boxing Association (CBA) was established in 1986; the sport of boxing resumed in March; the CBA formally joined the International Boxing Federation (IBF) in June 1987; and the Chinese boxing team was formally established in 1988. The Chinese boxing team was officially established in 1988 to prepare for the 1990 Asian Games in Beijing.

The Sixth National Congress of the Chinese Boxing Association was conducted in Beijing on February 7, 2018.
