= Bağcılar Olympic Sport Hall =

Indoor sports venue in Istanbul, Turkey

Coordinates: 41°02′32″N 28°51′16″E

- Interactive map of Bağcılar Olympic Sport Hall
- Location: Fevzi Çakmak Mah. Fatih Cad.50/A; Bağcılar, Istanbul
- Owner: Istanbul Metropolitan Municipality
- Capacity: 1,300 (main hall), 3,500 (total)

Construction
- Opened: 2001

Bağcılar Olympic Sport Hall (Turkish: Bağcılar Olimpik Spor Salonu) is a multi-purpose indoor sports complex with Olympic standards located in Bağcılar district of Istanbul, Turkey.

== History ==
Its construction began in 1998, and the sport hall was inaugurated on 20 March 2001 in presence of the Belgian action films actor and former martial arts sportsman Jean-Claude Van Damme. The sports complex is owned by the Metropolitan Municipality of Istanbul. The main hall of the building is suitable for sports events such as basketball, volleyball, badminton, wrestling, handball, tennis, gymnastics, weightlifting, boxing, martial arts, fencing, table tennis and indoor soccer. It offers a seating capacity for 1,300 people. Additionally, there are also 8 halls for fencing, judo, taekwondo, karate, table tennis (2 halls), aerobics, gymnastics, weightlifting, boxing and wrestling. Its covered parking lot has a capacity of 800 cars.

== Architecture ==
The sports complex with the dimensions of 110 m × 80 m (360 ft × 260 ft) is a mono bloc construction built on an area of 9,000 m^{2} (97,000 sq ft) having a total covered area of 46,000 m^{2} (500,000 sq ft). The six-storey building is covered by a double-curved roof having the shape of a hyperbolic paraboloid made in space frame system. The appearance of the building is a rectangular form in natural stone with a dome designed as two merging thin-shell structures rising up through it.

== International sport events hosted ==
- July 25–30, 2006 European U17 Freestyle, Greco-Roman and Women's Wrestling Championships
- October 19–21, 2007 5th World Junior and Cadet Karate Championships
- October 22–25, 2007 European Junior Badminton Ranking Championship
- October 24–28, 2007 European U17 Badminton Team Championships
- September 8–11, 2011 The first and greatest Asian Martial Arts Olympiad Competitions,
- June 4–10, 2018 4th European U23 Wrestling Championships,
- January 10–12, 2020 Yasar Dogu Tournament
