= British Lionhearts =

Boxing competitions

- Founded: 2012
- League: World Series Boxing
- Arena: York Hall
- Colours: Red, White, Blue
- General manager: Matt Archibald
- Broadcasters: ESPN
- Website: Home site

The British Lionhearts are a British amateur boxing team that competed in the World Series Boxing tournament.

== History ==
The British Lionhearts are an amateur team that was established in 2012 to compete in the third season of the World Series Boxing tournament. Although the competition is organised by the International Boxing Association and only open to amateur boxers and professional boxers with less than 15 bouts, the competition is in effect professional as the competitors are paid a salary and prize money.

The team, which is based at the English Institute of Sport – Sheffield, took part in its first contest on 15 November 2012, facing the USA Knockouts at The Hanger at Costa Mesa in California. The first British team consisted of Anthony Fowler, Joe Cordina, Zlatko Ledic, Uaine Fa and Sean McGoldrick.

== 2012-13 Season ==
The British Lionhearts' debut season in the WSB saw them qualify from group B of the tournament before they were beaten by the Mexico Guerreros in the quarter-final stage. During the 2012-13 season the majority of their home fixtures were staged at York Hall in London, England.

Fixtures & Results

Week	Date	Fixture	Score	Venue
1	15-11-2012	(United States) USA Knockouts (A)	1/4	The Hangar, Costa Mesa, California, United States
2	23-11-2012	(Italy) Dolce & Gabbana Italia Thunder (H)	4/1	Celtic Manor Resort, Newport, Wales
3	08-12-2012	(Kazakhstan) Astana Arlans (A)	0/5	Almaty Sports Palace, Almaty, Kazakhstan
4	14-12-2012	(Germany) German Eagles (H)	4/1	Earl's Court, London, England
5	11-01-2013	Ukraine Otamans (A)	4/1	Acco International Exhibition Centre, Kyiv, Ukraine
6	17-01-2013	(United States) USA Knockouts (H)	5/0	York Hall, London, England
7	02-02-2013	(Italy) Dolce & Gabbana Italia Thunder (A)	4/1	Palamaggio, Caserta, Italy
8	07-02-2013	(Kazakhstan) Astana Arlans (H)	4/1	York Hall, London, England
9	23-02-2013	(Germany) German Eagles (A)	5/0	Kuppelsaal Congress Centrum, Hannover, Germany
10	01-03-2013	Ukraine Otamans (H)	2/3	York Hall, London, England
11	22-03-2013	Mexico Guerreros (H)	4/1	York Hall, London, England
12	29-03-2013	Mexico Guerreros (A)	0/5	Foro Polanco, Mexico City, Mexico
