= Uzbekistan Boxing Federation =

Boxing association of Uzbekistan

Uzbekistan Boxing Federation UzBF
- IOC nation: UZB
- Sport: Amateur Boxing
- Official website: uzbboxing.com

History
- Year of formation: 1992

Affiliations
- National Olympic Committee: NOC of Uzbekistan

Elected
- President: Ochilboy Ramatov
- Chair: Saken Pulatov

Secretariat
- Country: Uzbekistan
- Secretary General: Shohid Tillaboev
- Olympic team manager: Shakhboz Tavakkalov
- Head coach: Tulkin Kilichev

Finance
- Sponsors: OFB, 7Saber, UzRailways

Uzbekistan Boxing Federation (Uzbek: O`zbekiston Boks Federatsiyasi, Russian: Федерация бокса Узбекистана) is the governing body of amateur Olympic-style boxing in Uzbekistan. It was founded on March 23, 1920. The Federation was re-founded in 1992 after dissolution of the USSR. The headquarters is located in Tashkent. Uzbekistan Boxing Federation is a member federation of National Olympic Committee of the Republic of Uzbekistan. It is a member of the International Boxing Association (AIBA) and the Asian Boxing Council (ASBC).

== History ==
The history of the development of boxing in Uzbekistan is inextricably linked with the name of Sidney Lvovich Jackson, Honored Coach of the USSR. He was one of America's most popular flyweight boxers. The First World War found Sydney Jackson in St. Petersburg, where he spent his tour. Travel to the US was temporarily banned. Unable to return home through the US Embassy in Russia, Jackson went to Tashkent with letters of recommendation. Here the October Revolution found him, he decided to stay in Tashkent. During the Civil War, Sydney Jackson was a member of the International Brigade, a fearless fighter for the cause of the people. After the end of the civil war, Jaxson returned to Tashkent and was appointed as an instructor in the General Education in sports. Since that time, the history of the development of boxing in Uzbekistan begins The Boxing Federation was organized in 1928.

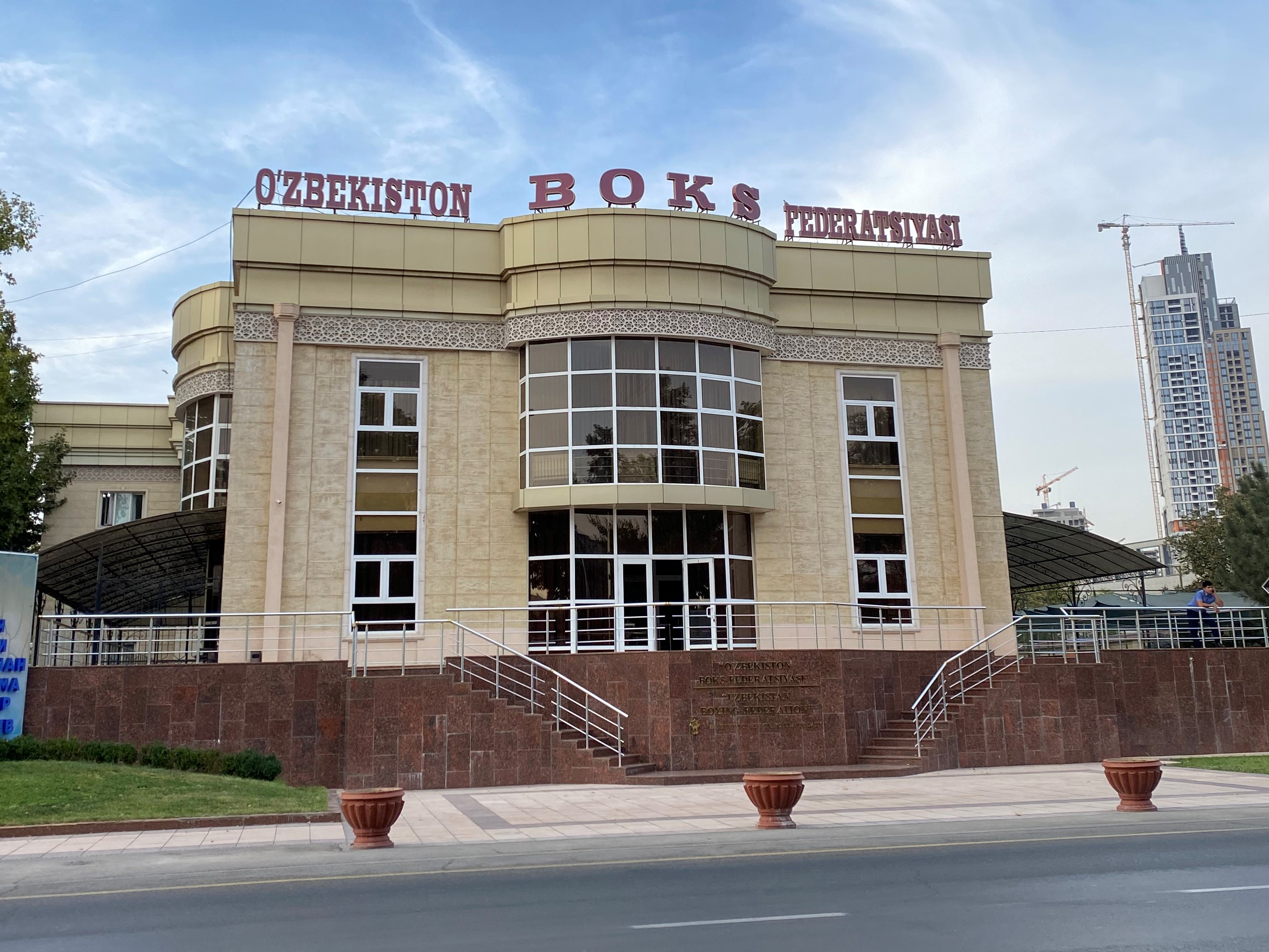
Headquarter of Uzbekistan Boxing Federation

In Uzbekistan, in 1990, boxing is cultivated in 4 DSOs (PR, "D", "TR", SA) there are 35 boxing departments, including DSYUSH-82, SDUSHOR-3, as well as 4 departments of SHISP in the cities of Andijan - 1, Samarkand - 2, Tashkent - 1. Currently the chairman of the Boxing Federation of Uzbekistan is Ramatov Achilbai Zhumaniyazovich.

The Federation's Chairman is Ochilboy Ramatov; the Vice President is Saken Pulatov; the Secretary General is Shohid Tillaboev.

== Affiliation ==
- International Boxing Association
- Asian Boxing Confederation
- National Olympic Committee of the Republic of Uzbekistan

== See also ==
- Aleksandr Khamidov
