= World Series of Boxing =

Boxing competition

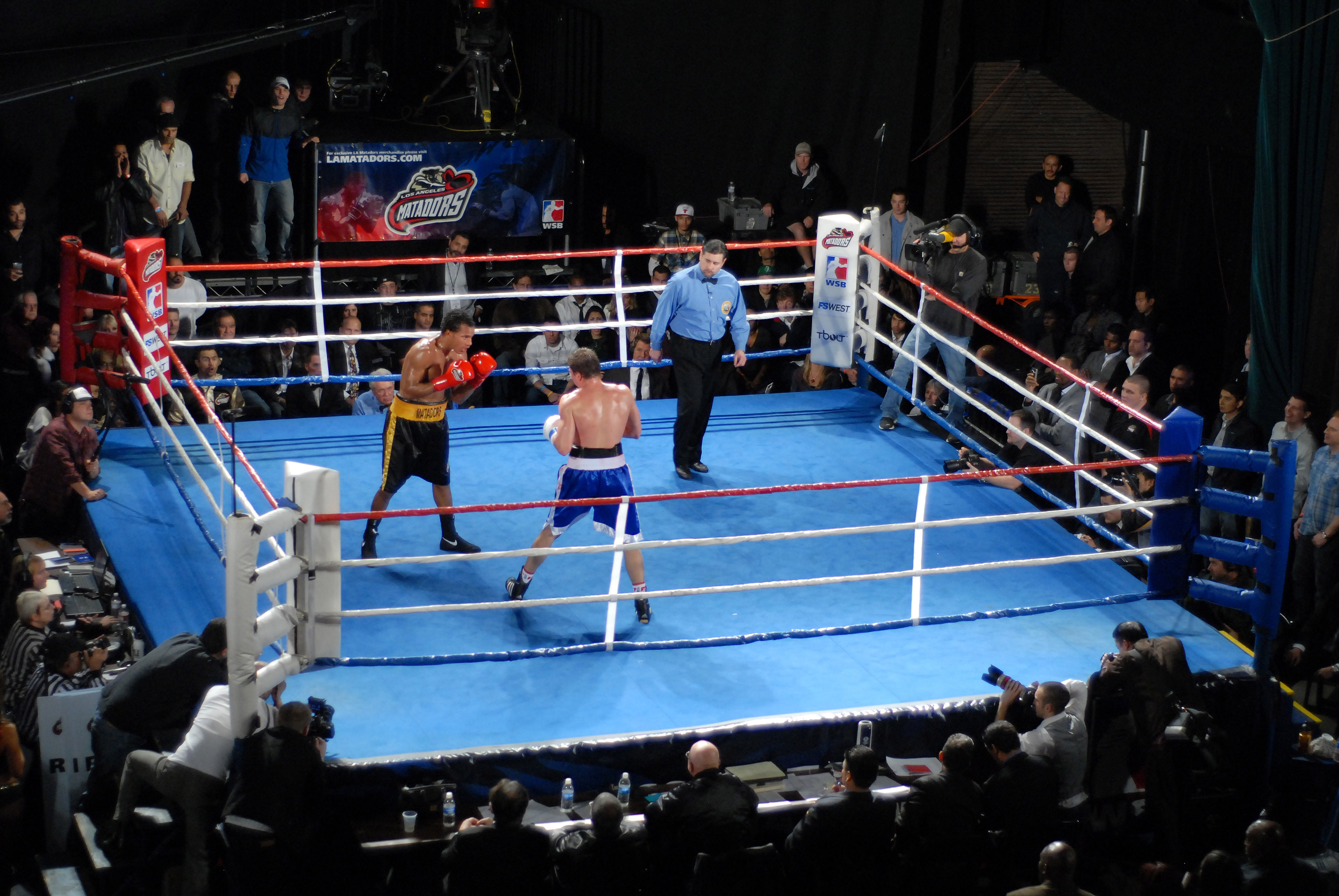
LA Matadors vs. Moscow Dynamo in Hollywood, CA on 4 December 2011. Both amateur boxers compete without vests or head guards.

The World Series of Boxing or WSB was an international boxing tournament that allowed amateur boxers to compete professionally while maintaining Olympic eligibility. It was organized by AIBA from 2010 to 2018. AIBA confirmed in 2019 that the league had ceased operations amid mounting financial losses.

== History ==
The World Series of Boxing had a precursor in the International Boxing League, a short-lived U.S. venture established in November 1969 after the first U.S.—Soviet boxing dual meet in 1969. The league functioned until 1971 and hosted several exhibition tours of the Soviet boxing team across the United States to cities where IBL teams were located. Bill Daniels was the boss of the league. The league folded due to the unprofitable nature of amateur boxing in North America.

== Format ==
Unlike in amateur boxing at the start of the World Series of Boxing's existence, competitors fought bare-chested and were not permitted to wear protective headgear. Each participating boxer was drafted by one of its international franchises, and could earn money by taking part in professional-style bouts. The competitors were allowed to maintain Olympic and AIBA world championship eligibility.

Like professional boxing, each bout was decided by the scores of three judges, or by a knockout, a technical knockout or a walkover. A WSB meet between two international franchises consisted of bouts in ten (formerly five) weight categories. The fights consisted of five three-minute rounds in each bout and the team that won the most number of bouts won the meet.

== Weight classes ==
Until season 4, the World Series of Boxing had five weight categories which were different from the 10 categories in amateur (Olympic) boxing or 17 categories in professional boxing. These were Heavyweight (91+ kg), Light heavyweight (80–85 kg), Middleweight (68–73 kg), Lightweight (57–61 kg) and Bantamweight (50–54 kg). In the fourth season (2013–14), the number of weight classes was increased to ten, mirroring amateur (Olympic) boxing.

- Light flyweight (46–49 kg)
- Flyweight (-52 kg)
- Bantamweight (-56 kg)
- Lightweight (-60 kg)
- Light welterweight (-64 kg)
- Welterweight (-69 kg)
- Middleweight (-75 kg)
- Light heavyweight (-81 kg)
- Heavyweight (-91 kg)
- Super heavyweight (91+ kg)

== Teams ==
- Algeria Desert Hawks
- Argentina Condors
- (Kazakhstan) Astana Arlans
- (Morocco) Atlas Lions
- (Azerbaijan) Baku Fires
- (United Kingdom) British Lionhearts
- Caciques de Venezuela
- China Dragons
- Heroicos de Colombia
- Cuba Domadores
- (Italy) D&G Milano Thunder
- (Russia) Dynamo Moscow
- (Germany) German Eagles
- Hussars Poland
- Mexico Guerreros
- Morocco Atlas Lions
- (France) Paris United
- Puerto Rico Hurricanes
- (Russia) Russian Boxing Team
- (Turkey) Türkiye Conquerors
- Ukraine Otamans
- (United States) USA Knockouts
- (Uzbekistan) Uzbek Tigers

== Results ==
Season	Teams	Winners	Runners-up	Final score
2010–11	12	(France) Paris United	(Kazakhstan) Astana Arlans	6–4
2011–12	12	(Italy) D&G Milano Thunder	(Russia) Dynamo Moscow	4–1
2012–13	12	(Kazakhstan) Astana Arlans	Ukraine Otamans	6–5
2013–14	12	Cuba Domadores	(Azerbaijan) Baku Fires	6–5
2015	16	(Kazakhstan) Astana Arlans	Cuba Domadores	6–4
2016	16	Cuba Domadores	(United Kingdom) British Lionhearts	9–1
2017	12	(Kazakhstan) Astana Arlans	Cuba Domadores	6–5
2018	12	Cuba Domadores	(Kazakhstan) Astana Arlans	7–3

== Performance by club ==
Performance in the WSB finals by club
Club	Winners	Runners-up	Winning years	Runners-up years
(Kazakhstan) Astana Arlans	3	2	2012–13, 2015, 2017	2010–11, 2018
Cuba Domadores	3	2	2013–14, 2016, 2018	2015, 2017
(France) Paris United	1	0	2010–11	—
(Italy) D&G Milano Thunder	1	0	2011–12	—
(Russia) Dynamo Moscow	0	1	–	2011–12
Ukraine Otamans	0	1	–	2012–13
(Azerbaijan) Baku Fires	0	1	–	2013–14
(United Kingdom) British Lionhearts	0	1	–	2016

== See also ==
- Boxing World Cup
