= Asian Boxing Confederation =

Boxing association

- Abbreviation: ASBC
- Formation: 1962
- Type: Sports federation
- Headquarters: Astana, Kazakhstan
- Region served: Asia
- Members: 42 member associations
- Official language: English
- Main organ: Congress
- Website: www.asbcnews.org

The Asian Boxing Confederation (ASBC) is the Asian not-for-profit governing body with 43 member countries in amateur boxing. It is a member of the world amateur boxing governing body International Boxing Association (IBA).

The ASBC is headed by a president. There is 1 vice-president and 10 board of directors.

== History ==
The Asian Boxing Confederation was founded as the Asian Boxing Federation in 1962 in Jakarta, Indonesia. The first Asian Amateur Boxing Championships was held in Bangkok, Thailand in the following year.

In November 2024. majority of the ASBC members voted to remain part of the IBA during a congress. President Pichai Chunhavajira resigned after the meeting.

In December 2024, World Boxing affiliate Asian Boxing elected its interim board. Asian Boxing is meant to supplant the ASBC. Former ASBC president Chunhavajira was elected to head Asian Boxing.

== Events ==
- Asian Amateur Boxing Championships
- Asian U22 Boxing Championships
- Asian Junior Boxing Championships
- Asian Youth Boxing Championships
- Asian Schoolboys & Schoolgirls Boxing Championships
- Boxing at the Asian Games

== Executive Committee ==
ASBC President
- (Kazakhstan) Aziz Kozhambetov

=== Sports Director ===
- (Egypt) Marina Ni

== President ==
- (United Arab Emirates) Anas Alotaiba
- (Thailand) Pichai Chunhavajira (2022–2024)
