= Dolton =

Dolton may refer to:

== Places ==
- Dolton, Devon, UK
- Dolton, Illinois, USA
- Dolton, South Dakota, USA

== People ==
- Domonique Dolton (born 1989), American boxer
- Noel Dolton, Australian rugby league footballer, active in the 1950s/1960s

== Other uses ==
- Dolton Records, a record label
