= Errol Spence Jr. =

American boxer (born 1990)

- Spence in 2023

Personal information
- Nickname: The Truth
- Born: March 3, 1990 (age 36) Long Island, New York, U.S.
- Height: 5 ft 9 in (175 cm)
- Weight: Welterweight

Boxing career
- Reach: 72 in (183 cm)
- Stance: Southpaw

Boxing record
- Total fights: 30
- Wins: 28
- Win by KO: 22
- Losses: 2
Medal record
Men's amateur boxing
Golden Gloves
Gold medal – first place	2009 Salt Lake City	Welterweight
Silver medal – second place	2010 Little Rock	Welterweight
US National Championships
Gold medal – first place	2009 Denver	Welterweight
Gold medal – first place	2010 Colorado Springs	Welterweight
Gold medal – first place	2011 Colorado Springs	Welterweight
US National PAL Championships
Gold medal – first place	2010 San Antonio	Welterweight

Errol Spence Jr. (born March 3, 1990) is an American former professional boxer who competed from 2012 to 2026. He is a former unified champion in the welterweight division, having held the World Boxing Association (WBA) (Super version), World Boxing Council (WBC), and International Boxing Federation (IBF) titles between 2017 and 2023. As an amateur, in the welterweight division, he won three consecutive United States national championships and represented the U.S. at the 2012 Olympics, where he reached the quarter-finals. In 2015, Spence was named Prospect of the Year by ESPN.

== Early life ==
Errol Spence Jr. was born on March 3, 1990, in Long Island, New York, to Errol Spence Sr. and Debra Spence. He was raised in Desoto, Texas. Spence wanted to become a Dallas Cowboys football star when he was young. During sophomore year of high school, Errol was brought to a boxing gym by his father to keep him out of trouble. After only 2 weeks of training, Spence won the Dallas Silver Gloves tournament .

== Amateur career ==
Spence took up boxing at the age of 15. In 2009, Spence won the U.S. National Golden Gloves, and also won three consecutive national amateur welterweight championships from 2009 to 2011, all in the welterweight division. Spence reached the quarter-finals at the 2011 World Championships, losing to Serik Sapiyev.

Spence lost in the quarter finals of the 2012 London Olympics to Russia's Andrey Zamkovoy and turned professional shortly afterwards.

He ended his amateur career with a record of 135–12.

== Professional career ==
=== Early career ===
On 9 November 2012, a 22 year old Spence made his professional debut at the Fantasy Springs Casino in Indio, California in a scheduled 4 round bout against 19 year old Jonathan Garcia. Spence knocked Garcia down and out in the 3rd round. In December 2012, Spence knocked out Richard Andrews at the Sports Arena in Los Angeles, California, which was part of undercard for Amir Khan's comeback fight against Carlos Molina.

Spence fought eight times in 2013, being victorious in all of them, winning six inside the distance. He was taken the distance in an eight-round bout in October by Emmanuel Lartei Lartey. The fight was rather one-sided, with all judges scoring the fight 79–73 in favor of Spence. By the end of 2013, Spence had won all of his 10 professional fights, 8 of them by way of knockout.

Spence made his Showtime television debut on 27 June 2014 at the Hard Rock Hotel in Las Vegas in a 10-round fight against Ronald Cruz. Spence was taken the distance and won a shutout unanimous decision.

On 13 December 2014, Spence beat Javier Castro by TKO in the 5th round at the MGM Grand Hotel and Casino in Las Vegas.

=== Rise up the ranks ===
On 11 April 2015, Spence defeated Samuel Vargas by TKO in Round 4 of 10 in a Premier Boxing Champions fight card at Barclays Center in Brooklyn, New York, bringing his record to 16–0. On May 16, it was announced that Spence would feature on the undercard of Shawn Porter vs. Adrien Broner on June 20 at the MGM Grand Arena. Spence defeated Phil Lo Greco (26–1, 14 KOs) via 3rd-round TKO. Spence was originally scheduled to fight Roberto García. García backed out of the fight three days before the card due to weight issues. Spence landed 73 of 142 punched thrown (51%) and Lo Greco landed 19 of 132 (14%).

Spence next fought on the undercard of Stevenson-Karpency against Chris van Heerden at the Ricoh Coliseum. The referee stopped the fight in round 8, after Spence knocked down van Heerden twice in round 7.

In October 2015 it was announced that Spence would fight at The Bomb Factory in Dallas on November 28 against Mexican boxer Alejandro Barrera (28–2, 18 KOs). Spence defeated Barrera via 5th-round TKO. This was an IBF eliminator for the number 2 spot in their welterweight contender rankings. Spence was ahead on all three judges scorecards (40–36, 3 times).

Spence was named 2015 ESPN.com prospect of the year.

==== Spence vs. Algieri ====
On 10 March 2016, it was announced that Spence would fight former light welterweight titlist Chris Algieri at the Barclays Center in Brooklyn on 16 April, his biggest fight to date. The fight was scheduled for 10 rounds. In front of a pro-Algieri 7,628 crowd, Spence became the first boxer to stop Algieri. This was Spence's seventh straight knockout. The end came when Spence delivered a left hook to Algieri's face. The hard shot sent Algieri straight to the canvas and referee Benjy Esteves waived the count. After the bout, Spence said "Kell Brook knows what time it is. We got to get in the ring and fight.". IBF later stated that Spence must have a final eliminator before he is declared mandatory challenger. For the fight, Spence earned $225,000 whilst Algieri earned $325,000. CompuBox punch statistics showed that Spence landed 96 of 311 punches (31%), whereas Algieri landed 36 of 114 thrown (32%). The fight averaged 1.482 million viewers on NBC.

==== Spence vs. Bundu ====
On 16 May 2016, Spence denied that his team turned down a fight against Brook, which had been previously insinuated by Eddie Hearn, Brook's promoter. Spence said that the IBF had ordered him to fight their #3 contender Konstantin Ponomarev in order to become the mandatory challenger to Brook. Although there were no agreements to fight, on June 9, Ponomarev injured his hand, forcing him out of the eliminator. Instead, it was confirmed that Spence Jr. would fight IBF #7 Leonard Bundu (33–1–2, 12 KOs) in the eliminator on August 21 at the Ford Amphitheater. The fight would be aired on a Sunday night edition of Premier Boxing Champions on NBC.

Spence focused on breaking down Bundu from the start. After five one-sided rounds, Spence backed Bundu against the ropes and connected with an uppercut that dropped Bundu. Referee Johnny Callas waved off the fight without starting a count. After the fight, Spence Jr. reiterated his desire of becoming IBF World champion stating, "I definitely want my shot at Kell Brook and his title, I want him next. If he vacates or gets stripped, then I'll fight for his vacant title. I've paid my dues." For the fight, Spence received $250,000 compared to Bundu's $30,000 purse. The fight drew 4.8 million viewers on NBC and peaked at 6.34 million. This was the highest TV audience for boxing in over 10 years in the United States.

=== IBF welterweight champion ===
==== Spence vs. Brook ====
In January 2017, IBF welterweight champion Kell Brook and his team were in talks with Amir Khan over a potential fight, whilst also keeping the mandatory fight with Spence as second choice. During negotiations, Khan urged Brook to fight Spence first and eventually talks broke down between Brook and Khan. Brook's promoter Eddie Hearn mentioned talks were already ongoing with Spence's manager Al Haymon for a fight to take place possibly in the UK in May. Hearn received an extension from the IBF for negotiations between himself and TGB Promotions boss Tom Brown, as they were progressing. The purse bid for the fight was set for 7 February by the IBF. On February 1, Hearn claimed that Brook will be keeping his title and make the defense against Spence and that he had reached out to Spence's team, to no reply. He assumed that they wanted the fight to go to purse bids. Spence said that he had no problem travelling to the UK for the fight, regardless of negotiations. With a deal close to being reached a day before the purse bids, the IBF granted a week extension, pushing the purse bid back 7 days. On February 13, a deal was reached for the fight to take place in Sheffield on 20 May 2017. At a press conference at Bramall Lane, Sheffield on March 22, the fight was officially announced to take place on May 27, 2017, live on Sky Box Office in the UK and Showtime in the US.

In front of 27,000 fans, Spence dropped and eventually stopped Brook to win the IBF welterweight title after 11 rounds. In a fight where mostly power shots were landed, Spence threw combinations to the head and to the body, gradually wearing down Brook. Brook did well working the counter and landed his own shots to the body. In round 10, Spence cornered Brook against the ropes and unloaded some heavy power shots, which caused Brook to take a knee. In round 11, Brook motioned many times that he couldn't see through his left eye and voluntarily took a knee. The referee started the 10 count, which Brook was unable to beat, giving him back-to-back defeats and his first as a welterweight. At the time of stoppage, all three judges had Spence ahead on their scorecards (97–92, 96–93, 95–94). Although he won the fight, Spence admitted it was not his best performance, "I give myself a B−. I was a little bit off with my offense and defense, but I give Kell a lot of credit. This is what true champions do. You go anywhere to fight." Spence landed 246 of 633 punches thrown (39%) while Brook landed 136 of 442 (31%). The fight was broadcast in the afternoon in the US on Showtime and averaged 291,000 viewers, peaking at 337,000 viewers. These were considered low numbers, even for an afternoon showing, possibly due to it being a holiday weekend. For the fight, Spence earned around £1 million and Brook earned a guaranteed £3 million.

==== Spence vs. Peterson ====
On 3 October 2017, Lamont Peterson (35–3–1, 17 KOs) vacated his WBA (Regular) title in hopes of challenging Spence for the latter's IBF title. Dan Rafael revealed that Spence was promised a $3.5 million purse from his manager Al Haymon for his next fight. On October 13, it was reported that terms would be finalised within a week. The fight was tentatively scheduled for Spence's 28th birthday, 13 January 2018, against Peterson. The event would be aired on Showtime. Peterson last saw action when he dethroned David Avanesyan in February 2017. The fight was confirmed on 14 October, with Barclays Center the front-runner to land the fight. At a presser, Spence spoke fondly of Peterson, "He's somebody I looked up to in the amateurs and I learned a lot from. I had a training camp with him at the Olympic training center. So he's a guy I really look up to. He's one of my favorite fighters. He'll fight anybody. I've never known him to say no to a fight. I'm looking forward to it. He's got true grit. He's a real fighter. He's a guy who gives it his all and has a big heart." On November 5, it was reported the fight was confirmed to take place at Barclays Center in Brooklyn on January 20, 2018.

On fight night, in front of 12,107 fans, Spence broke Peterson down mentally and physically eventually forcing Peterson's trainer Barry Hunter to stop the fight a second into round 8. Peterson was dropped in round 5 from a left hand by Spence. Peterson beat the count and looked unsteady, surviving the round. Peterson took a lot of punishment, but managed to fire back some offence of his own before the round ended. Peterson's face looked swollen and his eyes were puffy from Spence's hard shots. Spence also worked the body from the opening bell. After round 6, Peterson knew he was behind on the scorecards and indicated to his trainer, who said he would give him a few more rounds. In the post-fight interviews, Spence said, "I want to thank Lamont. A lot guys turned down the fight, and he took like a real warrior, and I commend him for that. My coach [Derrick James] came with a great game plan, and I just followed through with it. Keep my range, keep my composure." Spence admitted he would need to work on his defence a little. When interviewer Jim Gray asked Hunter about the stoppage, he replied, "It was really hard [to stop the fight], but if you know Lamont, you know he was not going to give up. So I had to stop it. At the end of the day this is my son right here. And there's nothing more valuable than his well being. If it comes to him or winning, I pick him. I care about him." After the fight, Spence called out unified champion Keith Thurman, referring him to 'sometime'. At the time of stoppage, all three judges had their scorecards at 70-62 for Spence.

According to CompuBox stats, Spence landed 161 of 526 punches thrown (30%), and Peterson landed only 45 of his 158 thrown (28%). For the fight, Spence had an official purse of $1.2 million and Peterson's purse was $600,000. The fight averaged 637,000 viewers and peaked at 695,000 viewers on Showtime.

==== Spence vs. Ocampo ====
On January 23, 2018, the IBF sent a letter to TGB Promotions ordering Spence to make a mandatory defence against unbeaten prospect Carlos Ocampo (22–0, 13 KOs) next. Zanfer Promotions, who promote Ocampo were also notified and were given until February 22 to reach a deal before purse bids take place. Because Ocampo was not rated in the top 2 in the IBF rankings at the time, at purse bids, he would be entitled to 15% rather than the 25% that a mandatory challenger receives. On January 24, Showtime announced that Spence would next fight on June 16 in Dallas, Texas. On February 24, according to ESPN, the IBF ordered purse bids to take place on March 6. Four days later, it was revealed that both sides had reached a deal. On April 30, an official press release confirmed that the bout would take place at the Ford Center at The Star in Frisco. In front of a sellout crowd of 12,604 fans, Spence knocked Ocampo out in round 1 to retain his IBF title. In response to some body shots from Ocampo, Spence hit back with a hard left to the body that sent Ocampo to the canvas. Referee Lawrence Cole made the 10 count as Ocampo tried to get up, but was in too much pain. The time of the stoppage was at 3:00 of round 1. The knockout for Spence was his 11th consecutive stoppage since 2014. Spence stated he wanted to unify the division by going after the winner of the Shawn Porter vs. Danny Garcia, Keith Thurman and Terence Crawford. After the bout, Spence said, "I was a little disappointed. I wanted to give the crowd their money's worth. I wanted him to sustain a bit and give him some punishment, but the body shot got him and I dropped him." Spence wanted to go at least 5 rounds. According to Ocampo, it was overconfidence that caught up to him and ended his world title challenge. For the fight, Spence made $1.2 million and Ocampo was given a $75,000 purse. Numerous Cowboys players were in attendance, including quarterback Dak Prescott. The fight averaged 683,000 viewers and peaked at 726,000 viewers on Showtime, an increase from his previous bout.

==== Spence vs. Mikey Garcia ====
On October 25, 2018, BoxingScene.com reported that negotiations between Spence and Mikey Garcia (39–0,30 KOs) were progressing, with the fight likely to take place in February 2019 on Showtime PPV. Garcia first began to call out Spence for a fight before he defeated and unified the lightweight division in July. On October 30, Garcia vacated his IBF lightweight title and the purse bid for the potential Richard Commey fight was cancelled. On November 13, PBC made an official announcement for their 2019 schedule. It was announced that the fight between Garcia and Spence would take place at the welterweight limit at the AT&T Stadium in Arlington, Texas on March 16, 2019, exclusively on FOX PPV. Many fans reacted to the fight being announced. Some welcoming the fight and praising Garcia for 'daring to be great' and some fans believed that the size difference would be too much as Spence is considered a big welterweight.

On the night though, Spence completely outclassed and dominated Garcia, using his superior reach to constantly land jabs to the head and body from a distance, landing 108 over the course of the fight. Garcia tried to close the distance, but with Spence's weight and height advantage, he was able to completely dominate Garcia even in the pocket. In rounds 8 and 9, Spence landed over 100 punches in two rounds, with the majority being power shots, constantly using lead hooks and uppercuts on the increasing backing up Garcia. In total, Spence landed 345 punches to Garcia's 75. Garcia was unable to land double-digit punches in any of the twelve rounds. The scorecards on the night read 120-107 and 120–108, twice, to give Spence a perfect 12 round shutout victory. After the fight, Spence was joined in the ring by eight-division world champion Manny Pacquiao. Both stated that they would love to fight each other next.

A crowd of 47,525 attended the event, generating a live gate of $5 million. According to ESPN, FOX's first PPV sold over 360,000 buys, possibly up to 380,000 buys, generating a minimum $27 million domestically. It was considered a success considering PBC's recent PPV's and the fact it was a PPV debut for both boxers. Garcia and Spence had a base purse of $3 million, up to $8 million based on PPV sales.

=== Unified welterweight champion ===
==== Spence vs. Porter ====
Spence fought two-time welterweight world champion Shawn Porter on September 28, 2019, in a unification bout with the IBF and WBC welterweight titles on the line. Porter tried to rough up Spence from the get go, knowing Spence is the superior boxer, which made for an intriguing and an action-packed fight. Spence knocked Porter down in the eleventh round en route to a split decision victory, with the judges scoring it 116–111, 116–111, 112–115. It was arguably a fight of the year candidate.

==== Spence vs. Danny Garcia ====
In his first fight since crashing his car in October 2019, Spence fought former two-weight world champion Danny Garcia on December 5, 2020 (postponed from November 21st), on PPV at AT&T Stadium in Arlington, Texas with Spence's IBF and WBC welterweight titles on the line. Garcia was ranked #2 by the WBC and #6 by The Ring at welterweight. He was awarded a unanimous decision victory with scores of 116–112, 116-112 and 117–111, and retained his titles.

==== Cancelled bout vs. Manny Pacquiao ====
On May 21, 2021, eight-division world champion Manny Pacquiao made the unexpected announcement on his social media that he and Spence would meet in the ring on August 21 in Las Vegas to face each other on Fox PPV. PBC and Fox confirmed the news, and it was reported that both men have signed contracts to face each other. The two men had previously already met more than two years prior on March 16, 2019, in the ring following Spence's unanimous decision victory over Mikey Garcia in Arlington, Texas, when both Pacquiao and Spence indicated they would relish the chance to fight each other. On June 23, the venue was officially announced as the T-Mobile Arena. However, on August 10, Spence was forced to pull out, after suffering a retinal tear to his left eye. He was replaced by Yordenis Ugás, with Ugás' WBA (Super) welterweight title being on the line.

==== Spence vs. Ugás ====
After successfully defending his title against Pacquiao, Ugás petitioned the WBA for a special permit to bypass a mandatory defense against Eimantas Stanionis in order to face Spence in a title unification bout. The petition was denied by the WBA on October 20, 2021, who stated: "...we are in special circumstances to resolve extraordinary situations, such as the champion reduction in every division to have only one champion". Accordingly, Ugás and Stanionis were given a 30-day period to negotiate the terms of their bout. As they were unable to come to terms, a purse bid was ordered for December 9, with a minimal bid of $200,000. The winning bid would be split 75/25 in favor of Ugas as the reigning titlist. On December 19, 2021, WBA President Gilberto J. Mendoza has confirmed that the Spence-Ugas was approved as Stanionis was willing to step aside. The unification bout was officially announced on February 8, 2022. It was scheduled to headline a Showtime pay per view card on April 16, which will take place at the AT&T Stadium in Arlington, Texas. Spence won the fight by a tenth-round technical knockout. The fight was stopped on the advice of the ringside physician, due to Ugas’ severely swollen right eye. Spence was leading on all three of the judges' scorecards at the time of the stoppage, with scores of 88–82, 88–82 and 88–83. Spence landed more total punches (216 to 96) and more power punches (192 to 77) than Ugas.

==== Spence vs. Crawford ====
Spence Jr. and the WBO welterweight champion Terence Crawford came to an agreement on “all material terms” for a title unification, which was expected to take place on November 19. The agreement included a bilateral rematch clause, with the winner of the bout earning the majority of the revenue in the rematch. Two months later, it was revealed by both camps that negotiations had fallen through and they would be pursuing different fights. Following this, the WBC ordered Spence Jr. to face Keith Thurman in a mandatory title defense. Potential dates were given of the fight between both men as June 17 and July 22 but both have been proven false. Finally, on May 25, 2023, it was confirmed that Spence Jr. would fight Terence Crawford for the undisputed welterweight titles on July 29, 2023, at the T-Mobile Arena in Las Vegas, Nevada.

After a slow start in the first round, Crawford quickly took control of the fight. In the second, he dropped Spence with a counter jab followed by a straight left hand. “That was more of a flash knockdown,” Crawford said of the second-round knockdown after the fight. “I caught him with the left. He didn’t think I was coming back with the right.” Spence managed to beat the count and kept trying to mount an offense, but Crawford's speed, precision, and power overwhelmed him throughout the fight. Crawford's jab was a standout weapon, not just a setup, but a dominant force that stopped Spence's momentum every time he tried to push forward. As the rounds progressed, Spence struggled to get anything going. Crawford's jab and crisp straight left hands kept him on the defensive, leaving Spence with little chance to land an effective shot. Despite hitting the canvas twice in the seventh, Spence tried to rally, but Crawford's relentless attack left him reeling. By the ninth round, Crawford had completely broken Spence down, leaving the referee no other option than to stop the fight at 2:32 of the frame. By that point, he had out-landed Spence 185 to 96 in total punches and 98 to 63 in power punches. In front of a sold-out crowd of 19,990, Crawford became the first undisputed welterweight champion since 2006 and the first male boxer in the four-belt era to claim undisputed championship status in two weight divisions. Crawford was up 79–70 on all three scorecards at the time of the stoppage. The PPV did around 700k buys, generating over $59 million in revenue.

After the fight, the IBF ordered Crawford to face its interim champion, Jaron Ennis. Because Spence exercised his rematch clause with Crawford, the IBF stripped Crawford of the title and made Ennis the full champion on November 9, 2023. In 2025, Spence stated that he would not have been prepared to compete within the timeframe required by the rematch agreement, saying: "I wouldn't have been ready, so how would I take a rematch if I'm not gonna be ready?"

=== Super welterweight ===
In August 2025, Jermell Charlo posted an image depicting a lion consuming a shark, representing his nickname "the lion" and Spence's nickname "the shark." This imagery suggested a possible matchup between the two, as both athletes aimed to rebound from their recent defeats. The prospect of this fight became more compelling following Spence's separation from trainer Derrick James, which resulted from a disagreement concerning compensation. Jacob Spence, the cousin of Errol, issued a caution to Charlo concerning their prospective fight. He stated, "We could do him worse than Canelo Alvarez did." Earlier in 2025, Spence was in negotiations with WBC super-welterweight champion Sebastian Fundora, but the discussions did not reach a conclusion due to disagreements. According to Mike Coppinger, on September 10, the two teams were in talks to fight in 2026.

==== Spence vs. Tszyu ====
After a three-year layoff, Spence returned to the ring against Tim Tszyu on July 26, 2026, in Australia.

Spence lost to Tim Tszyu by unanimous decision.

=== Retirement ===
During his post-fight interview, Spence announced his retirement from professional boxing, stating that he was leaving the sport with his health, financial security, and family intact. He retired with a professional record of 28 wins (22 by knockout) and 2 losses, ending a career that included unified WBC, IBF, and WBA (Super) welterweight titles.

== Personal life ==
Errol Spence Jr. is of Jamaican descent through his father and African-American descent through his mother. He was born on Long Island, New York, but has spent the majority of his life living in Dallas, Texas. He is the father of two daughters and a son.

=== Car crash ===
Spence was involved in a single-vehicle accident at 2:53 AM on October 10, 2019, in his hometown of Dallas, Texas, and was hospitalized in the intensive care unit. According to Dallas police, Spence's Ferrari 488 Spider was "traveling at a high rate of speed" and then "veered left over the center median onto the southbound lanes and flipped multiple times, ejecting the driver, who was not wearing a seatbelt." Spence sustained facial lacerations, but no broken bones. Earlier in the night, he had been drinking alcohol. He was released from the hospital six days later and was charged with a DWI, a class-B misdemeanor by the Dallas Police Department. Spence posted on Instagram "No broken bones I'm a savage!!" but deleted this post after receiving backlash, as fans stated he was lucky to be alive and noted that he could have seriously hurt others due to his drunk driving. Spence avoided jail time and received probation.

=== Other vehicular incidents ===
In January 2020, just three months after his October car crash, Spence was involved in another car accident. Spence told Kate Abdo in an interview in April 2022 that he was in his G-Wagon when another car crashed into him from behind. He was subsequently dropped by his insurance company.

In December 2022 Spence was involved in another car accident when a 14-year old stole his parents' car and while running a red light crashed head on into Spence's vehicle. Although Spence's car was damaged, both parties walked away from the accident relatively unscathed, with Spence complaining only of a leg injury.

== Professional boxing record ==
30 fights	28 wins	2 losses
By knockout	22	1
By decision	6	1

No.	Result	Record	Opponent	Type	Round, time	Date	Location	Notes
30	Loss	28–2	Tim Tszyu	UD	12	Jul 26, 2026	Afterpay Arena, Sydney, Australia	
29	Loss	28–1	Terence Crawford	TKO	9 (12), 2:32	Jul 29, 2023	T-Mobile Arena, Paradise, Nevada, U.S.	Lost WBA (Super), WBC, and IBF welterweight titles; For WBO and vacant The Ring welterweight titles
28	Win	28–0	Yordenis Ugás	TKO	10 (12), 1:44	Apr 16, 2022	AT&T Stadium, Arlington, Texas, U.S.	Retained WBC and IBF welterweight titles; Won WBA (Super) welterweight title
27	Win	27–0	Danny Garcia	UD	12	Dec 5, 2020	AT&T Stadium, Arlington, Texas, U.S.	Retained WBC and IBF welterweight titles
26	Win	26–0	Shawn Porter	SD	12	Sep 28, 2019	Staples Center, Los Angeles, California, U.S.	Retained IBF welterweight title; Won WBC welterweight title
25	Win	25–0	Mikey Garcia	UD	12	Mar 16, 2019	AT&T Stadium, Arlington, Texas, U.S.	Retained IBF welterweight title
24	Win	24–0	Carlos Ocampo	KO	1 (12), 3:00	Jun 16, 2018	Ford Center at The Star, Frisco, Texas, U.S.	Retained IBF welterweight title
23	Win	23–0	Lamont Peterson	RTD	7 (12), 3:00	Jan 20, 2018	Barclays Center, New York City, New York, U.S.	Retained IBF welterweight title
22	Win	22–0	Kell Brook	KO	11 (12), 1:47	May 27, 2017	Bramall Lane, Sheffield, England	Won IBF welterweight title
21	Win	21–0	Leonard Bundu	KO	6 (12), 2:06	Aug 21, 2016	Ford Amphitheater at Coney Island, New York City, New York, U.S.	
20	Win	20–0	Chris Algieri	TKO	5 (10), 0:48	Apr 16, 2016	Barclays Center, New York City, New York, U.S.	
19	Win	19–0	Alejandro Barrera	TKO	5 (12), 1:46	Nov 28, 2015	The Bomb Factory, Dallas, Texas, U.S.	
18	Win	18–0	Chris van Heerden	TKO	8 (10), 0:50	Sep 11, 2015	Ricoh Coliseum, Toronto, Ontario, Canada	
17	Win	17–0	Phil Lo Greco	TKO	3 (10), 1:50	Jun 20, 2015	MGM Grand Garden Arena, Paradise, Nevada, U.S.	
16	Win	16–0	Samuel Vargas	TKO	4 (10), 1:45	Apr 11, 2015	Barclays Center, New York City, New York, U.S.	
15	Win	15–0	Francisco Javier Castro	TKO	5 (8), 2:43	Dec 13, 2014	MGM Grand Garden Arena, Paradise, Nevada, U.S.	
14	Win	14–0	Noe Bolanos	RTD	2 (8), 3:00	Sep 11, 2014	The Joint, Paradise, Nevada, U.S.	
13	Win	13–0	Ronald Cruz	UD	10	Jun 27, 2014	The Joint, Paradise, Nevada, U.S.	
12	Win	12–0	Raymond Charles	TKO	1 (10), 2:52	Apr 18, 2014	Illusions Theater, San Antonio, Texas, U.S.	
11	Win	11–0	Peter Olouch	KO	4 (8), 1:39	Feb 10, 2014	Cowboys Dancehall, San Antonio, Texas, U.S.	
10	Win	10–0	Gerardo Cuevas	RTD	1 (8), 3:00	Dec 13, 2013	Fantasy Springs Resort Casino, Indio, California, U.S.	
9	Win	9–0	Emmanuel Lartie Lartey	UD	8	Oct 14, 2013	BB&T Center, Sunrise, Florida, U.S.	
8	Win	8–0	Jesus Tavera	TKO	1 (8), 2:33	Sep 12, 2013	MGM Grand Marquee Ballroom, Paradise, Nevada, U.S.	
7	Win	7–0	Eddie Cordova	KO	1 (6), 2:13	Jul 20, 2013	Fantasy Springs Resort Casino, Indio, California, U.S.	
6	Win	6–0	Guillermo Ibarra	KO	1 (6), 1:32	Jun 1, 2013	BB&T Center, Sunrise, Florida, U.S.	
5	Win	5–0	Brandon Hoskins	TKO	1 (6), 2:35	May 3, 2013	Cosmopolitan of Las Vegas, Paradise, Nevada, U.S	
4	Win	4–0	Luis Torres	UD	4	Mar 2, 2013	Our Lady of the Lake University Gym, San Antonio, Texas, U.S.	
3	Win	3–0	Nathan Butcher	TKO	1 (4), 1:03	Jan 26, 2013	The Joint, Paradise, Nevada, U.S.	
2	Win	2–0	Richard Andrews	TKO	3 (4), 0:44	Dec 15, 2012	Memorial Sports Arena, Los Angeles, California, U.S.	
1	Win	1–0	Jonathan Garcia	KO	3 (4), 2:41	Nov 9, 2012	Fantasy Springs Resort Casino, Indio, California, U.S.	

== Titles in boxing ==
=== Major world titles ===
- WBA (Super) welterweight champion (147 lbs)
- WBC welterweight champion (147 lbs)
- IBF welterweight champion (147 lbs)

=== Honorary titles ===
- WBC Diamond welterweight champion
- WBC Health Care Hero champion

== Pay-per-view bouts ==
No.	Date	Fight	Billing	Buys	Network	Revenue
1	March 16, 2019	Errol Spence Jr. vs. Mikey Garcia	Spence Jr. vs. Garcia	360,000	Fox Sports	$30,000,000
2	September 28, 2019	Errol Spence Jr. vs. Shawn Porter	Spence Jr. vs. Porter	350,000	Fox Sports	$26,250,000
3	December 5, 2020	Errol Spence Jr. vs. Danny García	Spence Jr. vs. García	250,000	Fox Sports	$18,750,000
4	April 16, 2022	Errol Spence Jr. vs. Yordenis Ugás	Spence Jr. vs. Ugás	250,000	Showtime	$32,125,000
5	July 29, 2023	Errol Spence Jr. vs. Terence Crawford	Undefeated. Undisputed. Unprecedented.	700,000	Showtime	$59,000,000
	Total			1,910,000		$166,125,000

== See also ==
- List of southpaw stance boxers
- List of world welterweight boxing champions

Sporting positions
Amateur boxing titles
Previous: Steven Martinez	U.S. Golden Gloves welterweight champion 2009	Next: David Grayton
Previous: Javontae Starks	U.S. welterweight champion 2009–2011	Next: Patrick Day
World boxing titles
Preceded by Kell Brook	IBF welterweight champion May 27, 2017 – July 29, 2023	Succeeded by Terence Crawford
Preceded by Shawn Porter	WBC welterweight champion September 28, 2019 – July 29, 2023	Succeeded by Terence Crawford
Preceded by Yordenis Ugás	WBA welterweight champion Super title April 16, 2022 – July 29, 2023	Succeeded by Terence Crawford
Awards
Previous: Félix Verdejo	ESPN Prospect of the Year; 2015	Next: Erickson Lubin
