= Terence Crawford vs. Shawn Porter =

Boxing match

- Date: November 20, 2021
- Venue: Michelob Ultra Arena, Paradise, Nevada, U.S.
- Title(s) on the line: WBO welterweight title

Tale of the tape
| Boxer | Terence Crawford | Shawn Porter |
| Nickname | "Bud" | "Showtime" |
| Hometown | Omaha, Nebraska, U.S. | Cleveland, Ohio, U.S. |
| Purse | $6,000,000 | $4,000,000 |
| Pre-fight record | 37–0 (28 KO) | 31–3–1 (17 KO) |
| Age | 34 years, 1 month | 34 years, 1 month |
| Height | 5 ft 8 in (173 cm) | 5 ft 7 in (170 cm) |
| Weight | 146 2/5 lb (66 kg) | 146 3/5 lb (66 kg) |
| Style | Southpaw (Note: Listed by BoxRec as a southpaw, but regularly switch hits as an orthodox.) | Orthodox |
| Recognition | WBO; Welterweight Champion; The Ring/TBRB; No. 2 Ranked Welterweight; The Ring No. 4 ranked pound-for-pound fighter 3-division world champion | WBO; No. 2 Ranked Welterweight; The Ring/TBRB; No. 4 Ranked Welterweight; Former two-time welterweight champion |

Result
- Crawford wins via 10th-round TKO

Terence Crawford vs. Shawn Porter was a professional boxing match contested on November 20, 2021, for the WBO welterweight championship.

== Background ==
On July 31, 2021, the WBO ordered Terence Crawford to defend his welterweight title against the #2 ranked WBO welterweight contender Shawn Porter. The former two-time welterweight champion was seen as the biggest challenge in Crawford's career up to that point, with ESPN describing Porter as "a quantum leap in competition". As the two sides were unable to negotiate the terms of the fight, the WBO set a purse bid for September 2, which was later postponed until September 14. Crawford and Porter would adhere to a 60-40 purse split, rather than the usual 80-20 split for mandated matches, taking into account the earnings from their three previous fights.

On September 14, it was announced that a deal had been agreed to stage the fight on November 20 at the Michelob Ultra Arena at the Mandalay Bay Resort and Casino in Las Vegas, airing on ESPN+ PPV. The event will be promoted and led by Crawford's promoter Top Rank, in association with Porter's promoter Premier Boxing Champions. In adherence to the agreed 60-40 split, Crawford is guaranteed upward of $6 million, while Porter is guaranteed at least $4 million.

== The fight ==
11,586 fans gathered inside the Michelob Ultra Arena to witness Crawford winning the bout via 10th-round technical knockout.

== Aftermath ==
At the post fight press conference Porter announced his retirement from boxing, saying "I was prepared to announce my retirement tonight, win, lose or draw. Even if it was a draw. I was not going to do it again. I'm announcing my retirement right now".

== Fight card ==
Confirmed bouts:

| Weight Class | | vs. | | Method | Round | Time | Notes |
Main card (ESPN+ PPV)
| Welterweight | (United States) Terence Crawford (c) | def. | (United States) Shawn Porter | TKO | 10/12 | 1:21 | ^{Note 1} |
| Middleweight | (Brazil) Esquiva Falcão | def. | (Canada) Patrice Volny | TD | 6/12 | 2:18 |
| Middleweight | (Kazakhstan) Zhanibek Alimkhanuly (c) | def. | (Cameroon) Hassan N'Dam N'Jikam | TKO | 8/10 | 2:40 | ^{Note 2} |
| Lightweight | (United States) Raymond Muratalla | def. | (Argentina) Elias Damian Araujo | TKO | 5/8 | 2:20 |
Prelims (ESPN 2/ESPN+)
| Featherweight | (Ghana) Isaac Dogboe (c) | def. | (Puerto Rico) Christopher Diaz | MD | 10 | | ^{Note 3} |
| Featherweight | (United States) Adam Lopez | def. | (United States) Adan Ochoa | TD | 2/8 | 3:00 |
Early Prelims (ESPN APP)
| Super Featherweight | (United States) Carlos Balderas | def. | (Ecuador) Julio Cortez | TKO | 4/6 | 2:13 |
| Welterweight | (United States) Delante Johnson | def. | (United States) Antonius Grable | TKO | 4/4 | 1:54 |

^Note 1 For WBO Welterweight title
^Note 2 For WBC Continental Americas and WBO Global Middleweight titles
^Note 3 For NABF Featherweight Title

== Broadcasting ==
| Country/Region | Broadcaster | | | |
| Country/Region | Free | Cable TV | PPV | Stream |
|---|---|---|---|---|
| United States | —N/a | | ESPN+ | |
| Latin America | —N/a | ESPN | —N/a | ESPN Play / Star+ |
| United Kingdom | —N/a | Sky Sports | —N/a | Sky Sports |
| Ireland | —N/a | Sky Sports | —N/a | Sky Sports |
| Australia | —N/a | | Main Event, Kayo Sports | |
| Turkey | —N/a | | | S Sport Plus |
| Thailand | PPTV | —N/a | | PPTV |

== Notes ==
| Preceded by vs. Kell Brook | Terence Crawford's bouts 20 November 2021 | Succeeded by vs. David Avanesyan |
| Preceded by vs. Sebastian Formella | Shawn Porter's bouts 20 November 2021 | Retired |
