= Phil Lo Greco =

Canadian boxer

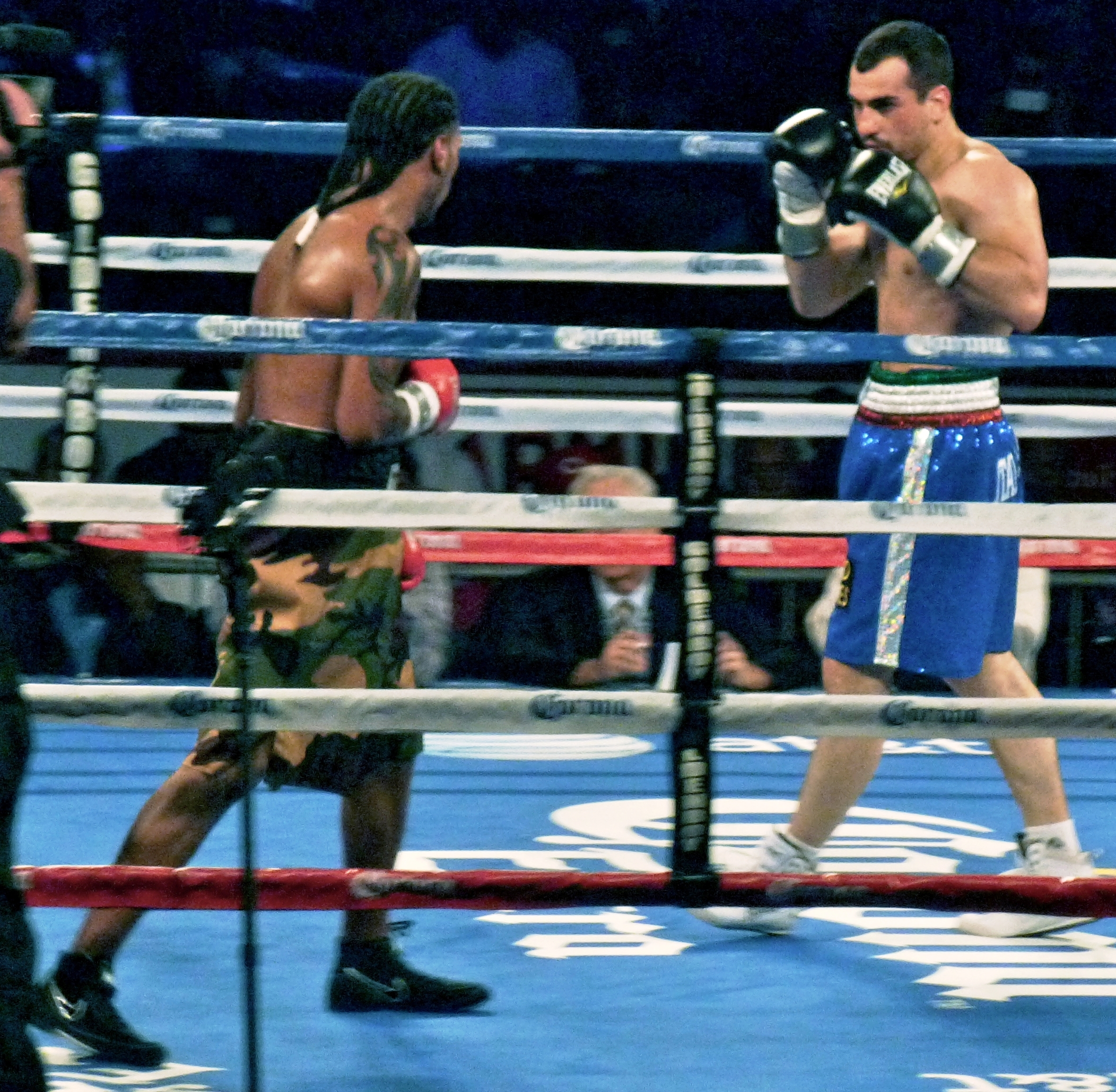
- Phil Lo Greco (right) vs. Daniel Sostre in 2012

Personal information
- Nickname: The Italian Sensation
- Born: Phil Lo Greco; July 6, 1984 (age 42) Toronto, Ontario, Canada
- Height: 5 ft 8 in (173 cm)
- Weight: Welterweight; Light middleweight

Boxing career
- Reach: 70 in (178 cm)
- Stance: Orthodox

Boxing record
- Total fights: 32
- Wins: 28
- Win by KO: 15
- Losses: 4

Phil Lo Greco (born July 6, 1984) is a Canadian former professional boxer.

== Professional career ==
On June 18, 2010, Lo Greco knocked out the veteran Slawomir Ziemlewicz to win the WBC International welterweight title. This bout was held at the Ristorante La Faraona in Syracuse, Sicily, Italy.

In December 2014, he signed with boxing adviser Al Haymon. He attended Dante Alighieri high school in Toronto.

== Professional boxing record ==
32 fights	28 wins	4 losses
By knockout	15	2
By decision	13	2

No.	Result	Record	Opponent	Type	Round, time	Date	Location	Notes
32	Loss	28–4	(United Kingdom) Amir Khan	TKO	1 (12), 0:39	2018-04-21	(United Kingdom) Echo Arena, Liverpool, England	
31	Win	28–3	(Mexico) Jesus Gurrola	MD	8	2017-06-30	(Canada) Scotiabank Convention Centre, Niagara Falls	
30	Loss	27–3	(United States) Joseph Elegele	UD	10	2016-06-12	(United States) Lakeland Events Center, Lakeland	
29	Win	27–2	(Mexico) Pablo Munguia	RTD	5 (8), 3:00	2015-10-13	(United States) Little Creek Casino Resort, Shelton	
28	Loss	26–2	(United States) Errol Spence Jr.	TKO	3 (10), 1:50	2015-06-20	(United States) MGM Grand, Grand Garden Arena, Las Vegas, Nevada	
27	Win	26–1	(Mexico) Rafael Cobos	UD	8	2015-03-06	(United States) MGM Grand, Marquee Ballroom, Las Vegas, Nevada	
26	Loss	25–1	(United States) Shawn Porter	UD	10	2013-05-18	(United States) Boardwalk Hall, Atlantic City, New Jersey	
25	Win	25–0	(Puerto Rico) Daniel Sostre	TKO	7 (8), 0:45	2012-11-17	(United States) Boardwalk Hall, Atlantic City, New Jersey	
24	Win	24–0	(United States) Brandon Hoskins	TKO	1 (8), 1:26	2012-07-14	(United States) Mandalay Bay Hotel & Casino, Events Center, Las Vegas, Nevada	
23	Win	23–0	(United States) Hector Orozco	UD	6	2012-04-28	(United States) Boardwalk Hall, Atlantic City, New Jersey	
22	Win	22–0	(Nicaragua) Ronny McField	PTS	6	2011-05-06	(Italy) Monselice	
21	Win	21–0	(Latvia) Semjons Moroseks	TKO	4 (6)	2011-04-15	(Italy) Palasport, Capoterra	
20	Win	20–0	(Poland) Slawomir Ziemlewicz	KO	9 (12), 2:17	2010-06-18	(Italy) Ristorante La Faraona, Syracuse	Won vacant WBC International Welterweight Title
19	Win	19–0	(Estonia) Albert Starikov	UD	8	2009-10-10	(Germany) Stadthalle, Rostock	
18	Win	18–0	(France) Sebastien Spengler	TKO	2 (8), 1:27	2009-08-22	(Hungary) SYMA Sport & Leisure Center, Budapest	
17	Win	17–0	(Mexico) Roberto Valenzuela	UD	8	2008-11-29	(Canada) Montreal Casino, Montreal	
16	Win	16–0	(Mexico) Jose Leonardo Corona	KO	1 (8), 1:38	2008-10-04	(Canada) Montreal Casino, Montreal	
15	Win	15–0	(Mexico) Noel Cortez	MD	8	2008-03-08	(Canada) Montreal Casino, Montreal	
14	Win	14–0	(Brazil) Luiz Augusto Dos Santos	UD	8	2007-12-07	(Canada) Bell Centre, Montreal	
13	Win	13–0	(United States) Frank Houghtaling	UD	8	2007-10-06	(Canada) Montreal Casino, Montreal	
12	Win	12–0	(United States) Jonathan Nelson	TKO	1 (6), 1:48	2007-08-03	(Canada) Pierre-Charbonneau Centre, Montreal	
11	Win	11–0	(Mexico) Antonio Soriano	UD	6	2007-06-08	(Canada) Uniprix Stadium, Montreal	
10	Win	10–0	(Mexico) Jose Luis Reyes	UD	8	2007-04-14	(Canada) Montreal Casino, Montreal	
9	Win	9–0	(United States) Jimmy LeBlanc	TKO	2 (8), 1:17	2007-03-10	(Canada) Montreal Casino, Montreal	
8	Win	8–0	(Puerto Rico) Jose Angel Roman	UD	6	2006-12-11	(Canada) Montreal Casino, Montreal	
7	Win	7–0	(United States) Chris Hill	KO	2 (6), 1:24	2006-11-25	(Canada) Palais Sports Leopold-Drolet, Sherbrooke	
6	Win	6–0	(Canada) Stephane Savage	TKO	1 (4), 2:26	2006-11-18	(Canada) Colisee, Trois-Rivières	
5	Win	5–0	(United States) Cornell Shinholster	TKO	4 (6), 2:30	2006-09-30	(Canada) Montreal Casino, Montreal	
4	Win	4–0	(United States) Joshua Smith	KO	3 (6), 2:31	2006-07-13	(Canada) Le Mirage, St-Leonard	
3	Win	3–0	(Canada) Sebastien Hamel	TKO	4 (4), 1:09	2006-06-23	(Canada) Uniprix Stadium, Montreal	
2	Win	2–0	(Canada) Yan Lecavalier	UD	4	2006-04-26	(Canada) Metropolis, Montreal	
1	Win	1–0	(United States) Derrick Jones	TKO	1 (4), 0:43	2006-04-08	(Canada) Montreal Casino, Montreal	
