= Mahonri =

Mahonri is a given name. Notable people with the name include:

- Mahonri Montes (born 1989), Mexican boxer
- Mahonri Ngakuru (born 2000), New Zealand rugby union footballer
- Mahonri Schwalger (born 1978), Samoan rugby union footballer
- Mahonri M. Young (1877–1957), American sculptor and artist
