= Javontae =

Given name

Javontae is a given name. It may refer to:

- Javontae Hawkins (born 1993), American basketball player
- Javontae Jean-Baptiste (born 2000), American football player
- Javontae Starks (born 1989), American boxer
