= Friday Night Lights Out =

- Logo
- Presented by: Scott Hanson; Thomas Hearns; Dana Jacobson; Jimmy Smith; Antonio Tarver
- Country of origin: United States
- Original language: English

Production
- Camera setup: Multi-camera
- Running time: Various
- Production company: Spike

Original release
- Network: Spike
- Release: March 13, 2015 – January 13, 2017

Friday Night Lights Out is the branding formally used for broadcasts of combat sports on the American cable network Spike (now Paramount Network).

The branding was first announced in January 2015 when, following a similar deal made by NBC, Spike announced they would air monthly fight cards by the Haymon Boxing-created "Premier Boxing Champions".

The branding would eventually be phased out after Spike's deals with PBC and Glory ended, leaving only the network's mixed martial arts coverage.

== Coverage overview ==
The branding came about from a rotation of live combat sporting events on Spike that were commonly aired on Friday nights, which included mixed martial arts cards from the Viacom-owned Bellator MMA promotion, and kickboxing events by Glory. On those weeks in which there weren't any live fights, Spike intended on broadcasting “shoulder programming” designed to introduce viewers to fighters’ backstories and build momentum for grudge matches. In 2015, Spike and Premier Boxing Champions signed a two-year agreement, with negotiations for a third year in 2017 that never made it into the final paperwork. The branding debuted on March 13, 2015 with Spike's first PBC fight card.

Spike's final PBC card aired on January 13, 2017. David Schwarz, Senior Vice President of Communications at Spike TV, said that one of the reasons for Spike deciding to discontinue its commitment to PBC was “a general dissatisfaction with the quality of cards being provided by PBC founder Al Haymon.”

=== Commentators ===
Antonio Tarver, who served as a member of Spike's broadcast team, explained that "I remember back in the day when fighters started their careers on NBC. Network TV. That's how legendary stars were made. I think NBC and Spike are going to do the same for today's fighters."

Joining Tarver on commentary was co-analyst Jimmy Smith, Dana Jacobson as host, Thomas Hearns as the pre-fight analyst, and Scott Hanson as play-by-play announcer.
