= Chris van Heerden =

South African boxer

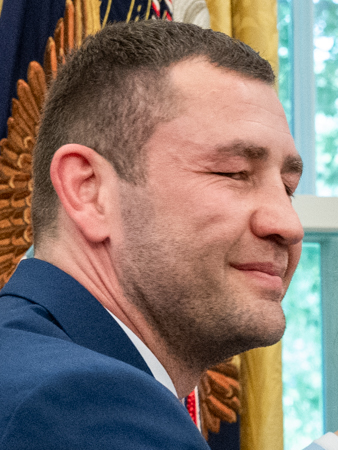
- Van Heerden in 2025

Personal information
- Nickname: The Heat
- Nationality: South African
- Born: Chris van Heerden; 19 June 1987 (age 39) Johannesburg, South Africa
- Height: 5 ft 9 in (1.75 m)
- Weight: Welterweight

Boxing career
- Stance: Southpaw

Boxing record
- Total fights: 33
- Wins: 28
- Win by KO: 12
- Losses: 3
- Draws: 1
- No contests: 1

Chris van Heerden (born 19 June 1987) is a South African former professional boxer and a former IBO welterweight champion.

== Early life ==
Van Heerden grew up in Meyerton, Gauteng.

== Professional career ==
Van Heerden started his professional career in 2006. He quickly emerged as a top fighter in the African continent, which he subsequently proved by snapping South African and ABU welterweight titles. However, in 2010 he suffered his first loss in the professional ring to Serbian Ivica Stevanovic for IBF Inter-Continental light middleweight title. This fight, though, did not stop him from rise to success. In 2009 he prevailed over fellow South African Kaizer Mabuza and gained IBO welterweight belt. He managed to defend his belt twice, against Sebastián Andrés Luján and Matthew Hatton.

In Winter 2013 van Heerden decided to relocate to the United States. The move meant that Van Heerden had been forced to relinquish his status as the International Boxing Organisation's champion but it was a move that he considered to pave the way to higher honours in future.

=== Van Heerden vs. Spence Jr ===
On 11 September 2015, van Heerden faced rising prospect Errol Spence Jr. Despite taunting Spence Jr numerous times throughout the fight, van Heerden was dominated by Spence Jr and dropped twice before the referee had seen enough and decided to stop the fight in round eight.

=== Van Heerden vs. Ennis ===
On 19 December 2020, van Heerden fought Jaron Ennis. Ennis was ranked #7 by the WBO, #10 by the IBF and #12 by the WBC at welterweight. After a clash of heads in the first round, van Heerden suffered a severe cut on his forehead which prompted the referee to stop the fight early, ending the fight with a no-decision outcome.

=== Van Heerden vs. Benn ===
On April 16, 2022, Van Heerden challenged undefeated prospect Conor Benn for the WBA Continental Welterweight title. He lost by 2nd-round TKO after being dominated and got brutally knocked down in Round 2, where the referee stopped it.

== Personal life ==
Van Heerden currently resides in Los Angeles, California. In February 2024, Van Heerden's girlfriend, Ksenia Karelina, was arrested in Russia after going home to visit her grandmother and being accused of donating $50 to a Ukrainian charity in February 2022. She was later sentenced to 12 years in prison on August 15, 2024. However, she was eventually released in a prisoner swap in Abu Dhabi between Russia and the United States with mediation from the United Arab Emirates in exchange for a German-Russian prisoner named Arthur Petrov on April 10, 2025.

== Professional boxing record ==
33 fights	28 wins	3 losses
By knockout	12	2
By decision	16	1
Draws	1	
No contests	1	

No.	Result	Record	Opponent	Type	Round, time	Date	Location	Notes
33	Loss	28–3–1 (1)	(United Kingdom) Conor Benn	TKO	2 (12)	2022-04-16	(United Kingdom) AO Arena, Manchester, England	
32	NC	28–2–1 (1)	(United States) Jaron Ennis	NC	1 (12)	2020-12-19	Mohegan Sun Arena, Uncasville, Connecticut, United States	For vacant IBO welterweight title; Fight stopped after van Heerden suffered a cut from an accidental head clash
31	Win	28–2–1	(Russia) Aslanbek Kozaev	UD	8	2019-08-17	Banc of California Stadium, Los Angeles, California, United States	
30	Win	27–2–1	(Mexico) Mahonri Montes	TD	(6) 8	2019-03-23	The Hangar, Costa Mesa, California, United States	
29	Win	26–2–1	(Germany) Timo Schwarzkopf	UD	10	2018-04-27	KFC Yum! Center, Louisville, Kentucky, United States	
28	Win	25–2–1	(Namibia) Sacky Shikukutu	UD	12	2016-10-22	Emperors Palace, Kempton Park, South Africa	Won vacant WBA Pan African welterweight title.
27	Win	24–2–1	(Canada) Steve Claggett	MD	10	2016-04-16	Downtown Las Vegas Events Center, Las Vegas, Nevada, United States	
26	Loss	23–2–1	(United States) Errol Spence Jr.	TKO	8 (10)	2015-09-11	(Canada) Ricoh Coliseum, Toronto, Ontario	Lost IBF International welterweight title.
25	Win	23–1–1	(Mexico) Raymon Ayala	RTD	4 (10)	2015-05-13	Madison Square Garden Theater, New York, United States	
24	Win	22–1–1	(United States) Cecil McCalla	SD	10	2015-01-09	Madison Square Garden Theater, New York, United States	Won vacant IBF International welterweight title.
23	Win	21–1–1	(Ghana) Ray Narh	SD	10	2014-04-16	Barker Hangar, Santa Monica, United States	
22	Win	20–1–1	(Mexico) Cosme Rivera	RTD	4 (8)	2014-02-06	Florentine Gardens, Hollywood, United States	
21	Win	19–1–1	(United Kingdom) Matthew Hatton	UD	12	2013-03-02	Sandton Convention Center, Johannesburg, South Africa	Retained the IBO welterweight title
20	Win	18–1–1	(Argentina) Sebastián Andrés Luján	UD	12	2012-06-16	Emperors Palace, Kempton Park, South Africa	Retained the IBO welterweight title
19	Win	17–1–1	(South Africa) Kaizer Mabuza	UD	12	2011-09-24	Emperors Palace, Kempton Park, South Africa	Won vacant IBO welterweight title
18	Win	16–1–1	(South Africa) Bongani Mwelase	UD	12	2011-06-04	Emperors Palace, Kempton Park, South Africa	
17	Win	15–1–1	(South Africa) Boitshepo Mandawe	SD	12	2011-01-29	Carnival City, Brakpan, South Africa	Retained the South African welterweight title
16	Loss	14–1–1	(Serbia) Nikola Stevanović	SD	12	2010-05-29	Sport Hall Pinki, Belgrade, Serbia	For the IBF Inter-Continental light middleweight title
15	Win	14–0–1	(Tanzania) Venance Mponji	KO	1 (10)	2009-11-13	Meyerton, South Africa	
14	Win	13–0–1	(South Africa) Boitshepo Mandawe	UD	12	2009-07-10	Dr. Malan School Hall, Meyerton, South Africa	Retained the South African welterweight title
13	Win	12–0–1	(South Africa) Welcome Ntshingila	UD	12	2009-03-27	Matlosana Banquet Hall, Klerksdorp, South Africa	Retained the South African welterweight title
12	Win	11–0–1	(South Africa) Page Tshesane	TKO	11 (12)	2008-12-05	Carousel Casino, Hammanskraal, South Africa	Won the vacant South African welterweight title
11	Win	10–0–1	(Sweden) Hassan Saku	TKO	8 (12)	2008-07-25	Carousel Casino, Johannesburg, South Africa	Won African welterweight title
10	Win	9–0–1	(South Africa) Msizi Qwabe	UD	6	2008-02-22	Carousel Hotel & Casino, Temba, South Africa	
9	Draw	8–0–1	(South Africa) Page Tshesane	MD	6	2007-12-14	Nasrec Indoor Arena, Johannesburg, South Africa	
8	Win	8–0	(South Africa) Mpho Tshiambara	TKO	4 (6)	2007-09-21	Carousel Hotel & Casino, Temba, South Africa	
7	Win	7–0	(South Africa) George Mapalakane	TKO	3 (6)	2007-08-31	James Motlatsi Hall, Klerksdorp, South Africa	
6	Win	6–0	(South Africa) Luntu Kosana	KO	2 (4)	2007-04-20	Oliver Tambo Sport Centre, Khayelitsha, South Africa	
5	Win	5–0	(South Africa) John Mokgotsa	KO	3 (6)	2007-02-23	Nasrec Indoor Arena, Johannesburg, South Africa	
4	Win	4–0	(South Africa) Moses Mbowane	TKO	4 (4)	2007-02-02	Nasrec Indoor Arena, Johannesburg, South Africa	
3	Win	3–0	(South Africa) Keketso Mathaba	UD	4	2006-02-08	Nasrec Indoor Arena, Johannesburg, South Africa	
2	Win	2–0	(South Africa) Rodney Nepfumbada	TKO	1 (4)	2006-10-27	Johannesburg, South Africa	
1	Win	1–0	(South Africa) Lucky Mavimbela	TKO	2 (4)	2006-09-06	Emperors Palace, Kempton Park, South Africa	
