= Premier Boxing Champions =

Televised boxing series

Premier Boxing Champions (PBC) is an ongoing series of televised boxing events connected to manager Al Haymon.

PBC was initially promoted as an effort to return boxing to mainstream broadcast and cable television, as opposed to premium channels and pay-per-view. The first Premier Boxing Champions card was broadcast by NBC on March 7, 2015, and the promotion reached deals with an array of other broadcasters, with brokered cards scheduled across all four of the major television networks in the United States (ABC, CBS, Fox, NBC) and their affiliated sports-oriented cable networks (ESPN, CBS Sports Network, FS1, and NBCSN, respectively), as well as on outlets such as Spike and Bounce TV.

In parallel with the focus on major cards on broadcast television, the events initially featured a more elaborate in-arena staging than other boxing events, featuring an entrance stage, and a circular marquee and jumbotron suspended above the ring. The telecasts also employed various technologies, including a 360-degree camera rig above the ring, and sensor-equipped gloves and shorts for gathering additional statistics. However, these features were phased out from later events. By 2018, PBC had established long-term deals with Fox Sports and Showtime, with the networks paying traditional rights fees, and holding the rights to produce PBC pay-per-view events.

Although it promotes the media rights of its associated events, PBC is not considered to be a promoter, in compliance with the Muhammad Ali Boxing Reform Act (which forbids a manager from also serving as a promoter). Haymon considers himself an "adviser" and manager. Golden Boy Promotions and Top Rank both filed lawsuits against Haymon and the investors of PBC, arguing that through PBC and other internal intricacies, Haymon was serving as both a manager and promoter—actions which are forbidden under the Ali Act. Additionally, the two promoters claimed violations of antitrust law, with Top Rank in particular claiming that Haymon was trying to effectively monopolize professional boxing in the United States by consolidating boxers with overpaid contracts, venue bookings, the events themselves, and broadcast rights under his ownership. Top Rank settled its suit in May 2016, while the Golden Boy suit was dismissed in 2017 after a judge ruled that it had "failed to demonstrate that there is a genuine issue of material fact".

== Production ==
Premier Boxing Champions was part of an effort by Al Haymon—best known as the representative of Floyd Mayweather Jr.—to bring mainstream prominence back to the sport of boxing. In the United States, although popular among a niche audience, most major boxing events were relegated to premium television channels (such as HBO and Showtime) and pay-per-view, limiting their mainstream exposure to those who are willing to pay. The growing popularity of mixed martial arts has also affected the popularity of boxing within the young adult demographic; the UFC's broadcast rights contract with Fox allowed some of its cards to air on the main Fox network—which proved successful in terms of overall viewership. In a survey conducted by Haymon, only 2% of the 35% of viewers who identified themselves as fans of boxing had watched it.

PBC's chief operations officer Ryan Caldwell acknowledged that when broadly distributed, major sporting events can attract a large number of live viewers as event television, and in turn, advertisers: he explained that they were "whacking our key demographic with a lot of fees on premium cable and pay-per-view. Broader distribution is key. When you look across other sports, there's a reason they aren't pay-per-view distributed." Caldwell also noted the success of WWE Network, which similarly subverted the professional wrestling promotion's traditionally PPV-oriented business model by offering its premium events and other archive programs as part of an over-the-top subscription service. PBC's vice president of operations Lamont Jones explained that the goal of the promotion was to build loyalty, believing that "the [same] way the customer goes to the grocery store and sees USDA on the steak and wants to buy it, we want the boxing fan to see to PBC on the telecast and know they can expect high-quality, competitive match-ups."

Executive producer Michael Marto felt that the in-arena experience of boxing events had been compromised by the focus on their television broadcasts, leading to a lack of "entertainment" for those attending in person. A concert-style stage setup known as the "Ring of Honor" was therefore developed for PBC events; inspired by the Colosseum and the stage setup of U2's 360° Tour, its centerpiece was a Jumbotron-like rig above the ring with an ultra high definition scoreboard screen and a circular marquee display. The screens were used as a scoreboard, and to play instant replays and other features. At the end of the arena was an entry stage known as the "Wall of Thunder". There were three different configurations of the stage components for different venue sizes. Film composer Hans Zimmer was commissioned to create theme and soundtrack music for the events.

New technologies were also developed for use during PBC events to provide improved insight and second screen experiences to viewers; Aqueti developed camera technology for use during the events, such as a headband-mounted camera for the referee, "Round-a-Bout"—a circular frame with 36 cameras to provide a 360-degree view of the ring below and "bullet time" effects, and 250-megapixel "microcameras" consisting of multiple digital camera processors linked together. Gloves and shorts were equipped with sensors for measuring the force of punches and other medical data respectively.

== Broadcasting ==
=== History ===
==== 2015–2018 ====
As opposed to most major boxing events, Haymon sought carriage for the Premier Boxing Champions cards on mainstream cable networks, and on the United States' major television networks. Haymon reached multi-year deals with NBC Sports (NBC and NBCSN), Viacom (Spike), CBS Sports (CBS, CBS Sports Network) and Bounce TV to air PBC cards through their outlets on either weekend afternoons or in prime time; rather than having the broadcasters pay the promotion a rights fee, the telecasts are brokered by Haymon to the networks in exchange for a cut of advertising revenue. Prior to these deals, boxing telecasts on the major networks in recent years had been limited to occasional one-off broadcasts, such as a broadcast by CBS in December 2012 in conjunction with sister premium network Showtime. All PBC broadcasters entered into exclusivity agreements with the group. CBS's contract contained an option for Showtime to carry PBC cards non-exclusively.

PBC cards on Spike were first broadcast as part of the network's combat sports brand Friday Night Lights Out. Antonio Tarver, who served as a member of Spike's broadcast team, explained that "I remember back in the day when fighters started their careers on NBC. Network TV. That's how legendary stars were made. I think NBC and Spike are going to do the same for today's fighters."

Under its contract with NBC, Haymon paid the broadcaster $20 million per year; NBC Sports' first 20 Premier Boxing Champions events included nine prime time cards on NBCSN, and five prime time cards on the NBC network—marking the first time in thirty years that NBC had broadcast a boxing event in prime time. The first PBC card aired on March 7, 2015, on NBC, and featured Keith Thurman in a welterweight bout against Robert Guerrero, and Adrien Broner against John Molina in a junior welterweight bout. Al Michaels served as the host, joined by Marv Albert and Sugar Ray Leonard as commentators. Viewership of the premiere broadcast peaked at 4.2 million viewers; NBC claimed that it was the most-watched professional boxing telecast since Fox's March 1998 Oscar De La Hoya's Fight Night (which reached 5.9 million viewers).

On March 19, 2015, ESPN announced a two-year deal with Premier Boxing Champions, in which the network would air 12 cards per year, with eleven prime time cards on ESPN and in Spanish on ESPN Deportes (airing under its Noche de Combates brand), and an afternoon event on ABC. ESPN's inaugural telecast aired on July 11, 2015. Concurrently, ESPN announced that after a seventeen-year run, it would end ESPN2's boxing series Friday Night Fights; its on-air staff of Joe Tessitore and Teddy Atlas were carried over to ESPN's PBC telecasts. On August 4, 2015, Fox Sports 1 announced that it would air 21 PBC cards on Tuesday nights (Toe-to-Toe Tuesdays) on the network from September 8, 2015, through June 2016. The telecasts were also simulcast in Spanish by Fox Deportes. The announcement came following the end of a contract between Fox Sports and Golden Boy Promotions.

On April 7, 2015, PBC announced a deal with SiriusXM to broadcast several of its cards on satellite radio via its Sports Zone channel.

On January 20, 2016, the PBC broadcast featuring headliners Danny García and Robert Guerrero was the first to be broadcast live in virtual reality by Fox Sports and NextVR.

On June 25, 2016, CBS broadcast its first primetime PBC card, featuring a WBA welterweight championship fight between Keith Thurman and Shawn Porter (won by unanimous decision by Thurman to retain his title), which marked the first boxing event broadcast by CBS in primetime since 1978. The telecast was produced by Showtime as a special edition of Showtime Championship Boxing.

==== 2018–2022 ====
By 2018, most of PBC's broadcasting agreements lapsed. In September of that year, PBC reached a four-year deal with Fox Sports, covering a series of 10 "marquee" cards per-year on the Fox broadcast network, 12 per-year on FS1, as well as Fox-produced pay-per-view events. Unlike the previous time-buy arrangements, Fox is paying rights fees; The Ring reported that Fox was paying $60 million per-year. Prior to the announcement, PBC reached a long-term deal with Showtime, through 2021. Despite PBC's previous aversion to them, Fox and Showtime would also began producing pay-per-view events as part of their respective deals.

In June 2019, Mike Coppinger of The Athletic reported that Ari Emanuel, co-CEO of Endeavor (parent company of UFC), had been in talks with Haymon to potentially acquire PBC, with Haymon maintaining his involvement (as Dana White had after its acquisition of UFC).

==== 2023–present ====
On December 7, 2023, with Showtime winding down its sports division, PBC announced an exclusive agreement with Amazon Prime Video. Amazon would stream a regular PBC Championship Boxing series in the United States and other countries on Prime Video, as well as ancillary content such as original documentaries and archive content. In the United States, Amazon will also distribute PBC pay-per-view events; they will not require an Amazon Prime subscription to purchase.

In July 2026, PBC was reported to be entering a broadcast agreement with DAZN, joining several other major boxing promoters already aligned with the streaming platform, such as Matchroom Boxing, Queensberry Promotions, Top Rank. and Golden Boy Promotions. The agreement came as PBC’s existing arrangement with Prime Video neared expiration, although Prime Video was still expected to carry some DAZN-distributed boxing events. A longer-term PBC–DAZN agreement was also expected to be finalised.

=== United States audiences ===
As of March 2017, the highest PBC audiences have been Errol Spence Jr. vs Leonard Bundu (NBC, 2016, 4.8 million), Keith Thurman vs Robert Guerrero (NBC, 2015, 3.4 million), and Keith Thurman vs Danny García (CBS, 2017, 3.1 million), all of which were fights at the welterweight division.

Broadcast and cable television

Year	Featured Bout	Network	Viewers	Division
2016	Errol Spence Jr. vs Leonard Bundu	NBC	4.8M	Welterweight
2015	Keith Thurman vs Robert Guerrero	NBC	3.4M	Welterweight
2017	Keith Thurman vs Danny García	CBS	3.1M	Welterweight

Pay-per-view

Year	Featured Bout	Network	Viewers	Division
2023	Gervonta Davis vs. Ryan Garcia	Showtime / DAZN	1,200,000	Catchweight (136 lb)
2020	Deontay Wilder vs. Tyson Fury II	Fox / ESPN	1,200,000	Heavyweight
2021	Canelo Álvarez vs. Caleb Plant	Showtime	800,000	Super middleweight
2023	Errol Spence Jr. vs. Terence Crawford	Showtime	700,000	Welterweight
2019	Manny Pacquiao vs. Keith Thurman	Fox	500,000	Welterweight
2019	Manny Pacquiao vs. Adrien Broner	Showtime	400,000	Welterweight
2019	Errol Spence Jr. vs. Mikey Garcia	Fox	375,000	Welterweight
2019	Errol Spence Jr. vs. Shawn Porter	Fox	350,000	Welterweight
2018	Deontay Wilder vs. Tyson Fury	Showtime	325,000	Heavyweight

== Reception ==
In its review of the inaugural Premier Boxing Champions event on NBC, Bad Left Hook praised the event's on-air production style for feeling more like a "modern", "true mainstream sports show" than the boxing events of HBO and Showtime, along with the performance of Al Michaels, Steve Smoger, and BJ Flores. The performance of Marv Albert was panned, noting that he "[missed] a lot of the action", along with Steve Farhood's lack of contributions beyond scoring the fights. Hans Zimmer's soundtrack was also criticized for being "generic" and "[robbing] fighters of their own personalities." Bleacher Report was similarly mixed, describing the atmosphere as being too "sterile" for a sport that "thrives on chaos", and that "the bland short walks to the ring and generic music presenting the fighters as interchangeable automatons [are] more NFL than WWE". NBC's on-air talent also received mixed reviews, especially the poor performance of Albert, explaining that "Albert, who hasn't called boxing since 1985, sounded like a guy who hadn't called boxing in 30 years. He had a hard time keeping up with the action, eventually giving up on play-by-play and occasionally adding a booming 'Yes!' whenever a particularly telling blow landed."

Bloody Elbow noted that PBC's initial ambitions "largely failed in the short-term; poor ratings, inactive fighters, questionable matchmaking, and planned event dates falling through (among other things) led to genuine concern that they would falter by the end of 2016." In September 2016, ESPN writer Dan Rafael observed that PBC's events had been diminishing in scale (presumed to be the result of dwindling funding), with lower-profile fights at smaller venues (as opposed to the higher-profile main events at major arenas), dropping the staging and production elements that were associated with the early events, and a lower saturation of events overall than there were at the onset (although noting that they were also likely trying to avoid competition with football season).

=== Controversy ===
On May 6, 2015, Oscar De La Hoya's Golden Boy Promotions filed a $300 million lawsuit against Al Haymon and the financiers of Premier Boxing Champions, alleging a violation of antitrust laws and the Muhammad Ali Boxing Reform Act. Golden Boy alleged that Haymon had violated the act's requirement that managers not serve as promoters, stating that he had "forbidden hundreds of boxers he manages to sign with any other promoter; and he has acted to cut off legitimate promoters not only from promoting boxers he manages, but also from essential network television of boxing matches and from the quality arenas necessary for the effective presentation of their bouts. His illegal conduct, designed to eliminate all competition, also constitutes an 'unlawful ... business act or practice' constituting 'unfair competition' under California Business and Professions Code."

On July 1, 2015, Top Rank filed a similar lawsuit against Haymon and Premier Boxing Champions investor Waddell & Reed, seeking an injunction to cease the events and $100 million in damages. Top Rank alleged violations of the Ali act and antitrust laws, arguing that Haymon was attempting to monopolize boxing through internal practices such as using "sham" promoters that are ultimately connected to Haymon, attempting to prevent major venues from being booked by competing promoters by reserving them for a different event, but cancelling and moving the event elsewhere after a competing event is forced to re-locate, and entering into exclusivity agreements with broadcasters through Premier Boxing Champions to prevent them from broadcasting competing events. Top Rank alleged that "with the financial backing, complicity, and material assistance of Waddell & Reed and other financiers, Haymon is rigging the boxing industry so they can act as manager, promoter, sponsor, and ticket broker for nearly every major professional boxer competing in the United States". An attorney representing Haymon denied the lawsuit, claiming it was "entirely without merit and is a cynical attempt by boxing’s old guard to use the courts to undermine the accessibility, credibility and exposure of boxing that the sport so desperately needs."

The Top Rank lawsuit was dismissed in October 2015, with the court ruling that the promoter had failed to provide specific examples of the conduct that it had alleged, nor evidence that the alleged actions harmed Top Rank, but in the decision federal judge John F. Walter allowed Top Rank to file an amended complaint after removing Premier Boxing Champion financier Waddell and Reed, which Top Rank did. After receiving the amended complaint, Judge Walter allowed the case to continue and ruled against Haymon's motion to dismiss on January 6, 2016. Top Rank and Haymon agreed to a settlement in May 2016; it was reported that the settlement also contained an option to explore the possibility of a Mayweather/Pacquiao rematch, although this was not confirmed.

Pre-trial documents of the Golden Boy lawsuit revealed that PBC's contract with NBC Sports called for Haymon to pay the broadcaster per-broadcast at intervals (with NBC being required to contribute $150,000 to cover a portion of the production costs for each telecast). It was also established that while PBC would produce the telecast, actual promotion of the event was to be contracted by Haymon to a "duly licensed" promoter. It was also revealed that the exclusivity clauses associated with the PBC television contracts had been waived in May 2016. In January 2017, the Golden Boy lawsuit was dismissed, with the court ruling that the promoter had "failed to demonstrate that there is a genuine issue of material fact as to any of their federal claims for relief".

== Awards ==
Since its inception, Premier Boxing Champions has given out end-of-year awards for various categories:

=== Fighter of the Year ===
- 2015: Keith Thurman
- 2016: Carl Frampton
- 2017: Jermell Charlo
- 2018: Jarrett Hurd
- 2019: Deontay Wilder
- 2020: Teófimo López
- 2021: Nonito Donaire
- 2022: Jermell Charlo
- 2023: Canelo Álvarez

=== Fight of the Year ===
- 2015: Krzysztof Głowacki vs. Marco Huck
- 2016: Keith Thurman vs. Shawn Porter
- 2017: James DeGale vs. Badou Jack
- 2018: Deontay Wilder vs. Luis Ortiz
- 2019: Errol Spence Jr. vs. Shawn Porter
- 2020: Jose Zepeda vs. Ivan Baranchyk

=== Round of the Year ===
- 2015: Daniel Jacobs vs. Sergio Mora (round 1)
- 2016: Robert Easter Jr. vs. Richard Commey (round 9)
- 2017: John Molina Jr. vs. Ivan Redkach (round 3)
- 2018: Deontay Wilder vs. Tyson Fury (round 12)
- 2019: Errol Spence Jr. vs. Shawn Porter (round 11)
- 2020: no award given

=== Knockout of the Year ===
- 2015: Yenifel Vicente KO3 Juan Domínguez
- 2016: Deontay Wilder KO9 Artur Szpilka
- 2017: Deontay Wilder KO1 Bermane Stiverne
- 2018: Danny García TKO9 Brandon Ríos
- 2019: Deontay Wilder KO1 Dominic Breazeale
- 2020: Alexander Povetkin KO5 Dillian Whyte

=== Prospect of the Year ===
- 2017: Marcus Browne
- 2018: Efe Ajagba
- 2019: Joey Spencer
- 2020: no award given
