= Raúl Pinzón =

Colombian boxer

Raúl Pinzón, known as "El Tendero" (born January 1, 1980, in Barranquilla) is a Colombian Welterweight boxer.

== Pro career ==
In Miami Raul fought Mexican sensation Canelo Álvarez on Telemundo, losing by spectacular fashion in the first round with a quick K.O. On May 15, 2009, Pizon lost to fellow Colombian Ricardo Torres. He then lost to undefeated welterweight prospect Mike Jones. In his last Fight he Lost to the future IBF and WBC welterweight champion Shawn Porter by first-round KO
