= Cus D'Amato Award =

American boxing award

- Sport: Boxing
- Awarded for: "Manager of the Year"
- Country: U.S.
- Presented by: Boxing Writers Association of America

History
- First award: 1967

The Cus D'Amato Award, known alternatively as the Boxing Writers of America Manager of the Year Award and previously known as the Al Buck Award from 1967 to 2008, has been conferred annually since 1967 by the Boxing Writers Association of America on the manager, irrespective of nationality or class of fighter represented, adjudged by the membership of the Association to have been the best in boxing in a given year.

Named after Cus D'Amato, an American boxing manager, the award is presented with other honors given by the BWAA at an annual awards dinner held in the spring of the year following that for performance in which the award is given. The award was named till 2008 after Al Buck, an American sportswriter, long of The Ring.

== Past recipients ==
Year	Manager	Nation
1967	Gil Clancy	United States
1968	Angelo Dundee	United States
1969	Yancey Durham	United States
1970	Dick Sadler	United States
1971	Yancey Durham (2)	United States
1972	Paddy Flood Gregorio Benitez	United States Puerto Rico
1973	Gil Clancy (2)	United States
1974	Herbert Muhammad	United States
1975	Eddie Futch	United States
1976	Bob Biron	United States
1977	Bill Slayton	United States
1978	Richie Giachetti	United States
1979	Angelo Dundee (2)	United States
1980	Emanuel Steward	United States
1981	Janks Morton Michael Trainer	United States United States
1983	Goody & Pat Petronelli	United States
1990	Shelly Finkel	United States
1991	Al Certo	United States
1992	Rock Newman	United States
1993	Lou Duva Shelly Finkel (2)	United States United States
1994	George Foreman	United States
1995	Fred Levin Stanly Levin	United States United States
1996	No award conferred	
1997	Pat Lynch	United States
1998	Floyd Mayweather Sr.	United States
1999	Panos Eliades Frank Maloney	England England
2000	Felix Trinidad Sr.	Puerto Rico
2001	Ricardo Maldonado	Mexico
2002	Norman Stone Klaus Peter-Kohl	United States Germany
2003	No award conferred	
2004	Bernard Hopkins	United States
2005	Al Haymon	United States
2006	No award conferred	
2007	Cameron Dunkin	United States
2008	Joe Calzaghe	Wales
2009	No award conferred	
2010	No award conferred	
2011	No award conferred	
2012	Al Haymon (2)	United States
2013	Al Haymon (3)	United States
2014	Al Haymon (4)	United States
2015	Al Haymon (5)	United States
2019	Keith Connolly	United States
2020	David McWater	United States
2021	Eddy Reynoso	Mexico
2022	Peter Khan	United States
2023	Bill Haney	United States
2024	Egis Klimas	United States
2025	Keith Connolly	United States

== See also ==
- Eddie Futch-John F.X. Condon Award, conferred by the BWAA on the trainer adjudged to be the best in boxing in a given year
- The Ring annual awards
