= Semajay Thomas =

American boxer (born 1993)

Semajay Thomas (born April 12, 1993 Chicago, Illinois) is an American professional boxer.

As an amateur, Thomas won his first major title at the 2009 national Silver Gloves championships in the 139 pound division. In 2011, Thomas won the U.S. national light welterweight amateur championship by defeating Thomas Duquette. Thomas was thus ranked #1 nationally, qualifying as the #1 seed for the 2012 U.S. Olympic team trials, Thomas won his first fight, defeating George Rincon 18-17. Thomas was defeated by Pedro Sosa the following day.

In 2013, Thomas turned professional, signing with managers/advisors Al Haymon and Flethcher Smith of Blueprint Sports Group. As of the end of 2014, he had won all five of his professional fights.

== Achievements ==
- 2009 National Silver Gloves Champion
- 2011 U.S National Champion
