= Erick Bone =

Ecuadorian boxer (born 1988)

Personal information
- Born: Erick Eduardo Bone Banguera; December 23, 1988 (age 37) Manabi, Ecuador
- Height: 175 cm (5 ft 9 in)

Boxing career
- Reach: 178 cm (70 in)
- Stance: Orthodox

Boxing record
- Total fights: 34
- Wins: 27
- Win by KO: 14
- Losses: 7
- Draws: 0

Erick Eduardo Bone Banguera (born 23 December 1988 in Manabi) is a welterweight Ecuadorian boxer who turned pro in 2011.

== Professional boxing record ==
Result	Record	Opponent	Type	Date	Location	Notes
30	24-6	(Mexico) Edgar Leonardo Romero Mora	UD	19 Sep 2020	Jardines de Gea, Sangolqui, Ecuador	
29	23-6	(Colombia) Segundo Herrera	UD	13 Dec 2019	Colegio Anderson, Quito, Ecuador	
28	22-6	(Ecuador) Alberto Bamba	UD	30 Nov 2018	Coliseo Federacion del Carchi, Tulcan, Ecuador	
27	21-6	(Colombia) Luis Guillermo Berrio	UD	27 Oct 2018	Centro Comercial Paseo San Francisco, Quito, Ecuador	
26	20-6	(Russia) Sergey Lipinets	MD	4 Aug 2018	(United States) Nassau Coliseum, Uniondale	
25	20-5	(United States) Cameron Krael	SD	11 May 2018	(United States) Sam's Town Hotel & Gambling Hall, Las Vegas	
24	19-5	(Ecuador) Humberto Toledo	UD	16 Dec 2017	Gimnasio HIIT, Quito, Ecuador	
23	18-5	(Colombia) John Merchan	SD	17 Nov 2017	Coliseo Federacion del Carchi, Tulcan, Ecuador	
22	17-5	(Ecuador) Humberto Toledo	UD	28 Oct 2017	Coliseo Federación, Milagro, Ecuador	
21	16-5	(United States) Eddie Ramirez	SD	20 Jun 2016	(United States) Sam's Town Hotel & Gambling Hall, Las Vegas, USA	
20	16-4	(Mexico) Miguel Vázquez	UD	28 May 2016	(United States) Cowboys Dance Hall, San Antonio, Texas, USA	
19	16-3	(United States) Chris Algieri	UD	5 Dec 2015	(United States) Barclays Center, Brooklyn, New York, USA	
18	16-2	(United States) Shawn Porter	KO	13 Mar 2015	(United States) Citizens Business Bank Arena, Ontario, California, USA	
17	16-1	(Kenya) Peter Oluoch	UD	8 Oct 2014	(United States) Beau Rivage Resort & Casino, Biloxi, Mississippi, USA	
16	15-1	(Mexico) Mahonri Montes	UD	22 Aug 2014	(United States) Pechanga Resort & Casino, Temecula, California, USA	
15	14-1	(Puerto Rico) Francisco Figueroa	TKO	10 Apr 2014	(United States) BB King Blues Club & Grill, New York, New York, USA	
14	13-1	(Mexico) Aaron Dominguez	UD	29 Nov 2013	Coliseo Julio Cesar Hidalgo, Quito, Ecuador	Retained South American super lightweight title
13	12-1	(Panama) Alberto Mosquera	SD	4 Oct 2013	Coliseo Ruminahui, Quito, Ecuador	Lost WBC Latino super lightweight title
12	12-0	(Mexico) Oscar Arenas	TKO	17 Aug 2013	Palacio de los Deportes, Bogota, Colombia	Retained South American super lightweight title
11	11-0	(Colombia) Francisco Fuentes	KO	5 Jul 2013	Coliseo Julio Cesar Hidalgo, Quito, Ecuador	Retained South American super lightweight title
10	10-0	(Ecuador) Eduardo Flores	UD	5 Jun 2013	Hotel Casino Plaza, Quito, Ecuador	Retained WBA Fedebol welterweight title
9	9-0	(Mexico) Luis Acevedo	KO	26 Apr 2013	Coliseo Julio Cesar Hidalgo, Quito, Ecuador	Retained interim South American super lightweight title
8	8-0	(Colombia) Dunis Linan	UD	1 Mar 2013	Coliseo Julio Cesar Hidalgo, Quito, Ecuador	Won vacant WBA Fedebol welterweight title
7	7-0	(Panama) Augusto Pinilla	UD	30 Nov 2012	Coliseo Julio Cesar Hidalgo, Quito, Ecuador	Won interim South American super lightweight title
6	6-0	(Colombia) Pascual Salgado	RTD	1 Sep 2012	Coliseo Julio Cesar Hidalgo, Quito, Ecuador	
5	5-0	(Ecuador) Washington Herrera	TKO	5 Mar 2012	Coliseo del Batallon. Fuerte Patria, Quito, Ecuador	
4	4-0	(Colombia) Luis Carlos Tejedor	KO	2 Mar 2012	Coliseo Julio Cesar Hidalgo, Quito, Ecuador	
3	3-0	(Ecuador) Humberto Sosa	UD	28 Oct 2011	Coliseo Julio Cesar Hidalgo, Quito, Ecuador	
2	2-0	(Ecuador) Washington Herrera	TKO	17 Sep 2011	Coliseo Mayor del Tena, Napo, Ecuador	
1	1-0	(Ecuador) Fidel Bennett	MD	29 Jul 2011	Coliseo Luis Leoro Franco, Ibarra, Ecuador	Professional debut
