= Al Haymon =

American businessman and boxing manager (born 1955)

Al Haymon (born April 21, 1955) is an American businessman and boxing manager. He was the manager of Floyd Mayweather Jr. and has won the Boxing Writers of America Manager of the Year Award five times.

== Early life ==
Haymon was raised in Cleveland, Ohio, and studied economics at Harvard. He also has an MBA from Harvard.

== Music career ==
His first career was in music promotion, where he promoted such acts as M. C. Hammer, New Edition, Whitney Houston, Janet Jackson, Mary J. Blige and Rick James. He branched out to other entertainment areas, such as when he worked with Eddie Murphy. In 1999, he sold 50% of A. H. Enterprises to SFX Entertainment.

== Boxing career ==
Around 2000, Haymon ventured into boxing when he managed Vernon Forrest. Over the next decade, he gained considerable influence in boxing, mainly due to his connection to Floyd Mayweather Jr. In 2005 and 2013, he won the Al Buck Award (Manager of the Year) from the Boxing Writers Association of America.

Haymon founded Premier Boxing Champions, which held its first event in 2015.

Greg Bishop, formerly of the New York Times and now of Sports Illustrated, suggests that Haymon functions as both promoter and manager, against the principles of the Muhammad Ali Boxing Reform Act, which was designed to separate boxing promoters from boxing managers. He has also been criticized by fans and writers alike for the inactivity of many of his fighters.

Haymon is a mysterious figure in boxing, he is rarely seen at fights or press conferences, and has never been interviewed by any sports media in 25 years. In 2017, he was the subject of a detailed feature by www.ringobserver.com

== Notable client list ==
Fighters who are currently or were previously represented by Haymon include:

- Dominic Breazeale (since 2012)
- Marcus Browne (since 2012)
- Sergiy Derevyanchenko (since 2014)
- Joe Joyce (2018–2019)
- Josesito López (since 2012)
- Floyd Mayweather Jr. (since 2006)
- Luis Ortiz (since 2017)
- Manny Pacquiao (since 2018)
- Caleb Plant (since 2014)
- Guillermo Rigondeaux (since 2018)
- Andy Ruiz Jr. (since 2019)
- Errol Spence Jr. (since 2012)
- Deontay Wilder (since 2013)
- Devon Alexander
- Cristobal Arreola
- Jean-Pierre Augustin
- Andre Berto
- Adrien Broner
- Brian Castaño
- Chris Colbert
- Danny García
- Amir Khan
- Austin Trout
- Adonis Stevenson
- Julio César Chávez Jr.
- Peter Quillin
- Artur Beterbiev
- Hugo Centeno Jr.
- Jermell Charlo
- Jermall Charlo
- Erislandy Lara
- Gervonta Davis
- Jarrett Hurd
- Domonique Dolton
- Lamont Peterson
- Anthony Peterson
- Seth Mitchell
- Gary Russell Jr.
- Dominic Wade
- Antonio Tarver
- Sakio Bika
- Vernon Forrest
- Leonard Bundu
- Artur Szpilka
- Lamon Brewster
- Jermain Taylor
- J'Leon Love
- Omar Figueroa
- Paul Williams
- Léo Santa Cruz
- John Molina, Jr.
- Lucas Matthysse
- Chris Pearson
- Marcos Maidana
- Keith Thurman
- Paulie Malignaggi
- Tugstsogt Nyambayar
- Robert Guerrero
- Shawn Porter
- Luis Collazo
- Travis Kauffman
- Rances Barthelemy
- Semajay Thomas
- Roberto García
- Kevin Bizier
- Lucian Bute
- Andre Dirrell
- Anthony Dirrell
- Andrzej Fonfara
- Carl Frampton
- Abner Mares
- Eddie Chambers
- Gerald Washington
- Julian Williams
- Sergey Lipinets
- Mark Magsayo
- Eumir Marcial
