= Shawn Porter =

American boxer

Personal information
- Nickname: Showtime
- Born: Shawn Christian Porter; October 20, 1987 (age 39) Cleveland, Ohio, U.S.
- Height: 5 ft 7 in (170 cm)
- Weight: Welterweight; Light middleweight

Boxing career
- Reach: 69 1/2 in (177 cm)
- Stance: Orthodox

Boxing record
- Total fights: 36
- Wins: 31
- Win by KO: 17
- Losses: 4
- Draws: 1
Medal record
Men's amateur boxing
Golden Gloves
Gold medal – first place	2007 Chattanooga	Middleweight

Shawn Christian Porter (born October 27, 1987) is an American sports commentator and former professional boxer who competed from 2008 to 2021. He was a two-time welterweight world champion, having held the IBF title from 2013 to 2014 and the WBC title from 2018 to 2019. Porter was particularly known for his aggressive pressure fighting style, physical strength, chin, and high workrate.

== Early life ==
Porter is the third youngest of four siblings and was involved in boxing since the age of five. He credited his early entry into the sport to his father's influence, seeing it as a way to guide him and his siblings towards a positive path. Porter reflected that it was not until he reached the age of 10 or 11 that he began to comprehend the importance of boxing, as his initial motivation centered primarily on competing for trophies rather than a true interest in the sport.

== Amateur career ==
As an amateur, Porter competed mostly as a middleweight and compiled an astounding amateur record of 276–14. In 2007 he won the United States Golden Gloves Championship, but at the PanAm Games Porter was knocked out in the second round by Cuban Emilio Correa. Though he boasts amateur victories over current pro prospects Daniel Jacobs, Demetrius Andrade, Edwin Rodriguez, Shawn Estrada, and Jonathan Nelson, he came up just short in qualifying for the 2008 U.S. Olympics team. Porter is a graduate of Stow-Munroe Falls High School. There he earned all conference in football his junior and senior year.

== Professional career ==
=== Early career ===
Trained and managed by his father Kenny, Porter began his pro career at 165 1/2lbs on October 3, 2008, at the Wicomico Civic Center in Salisbury, Maryland, US. His opponent was Norman Johnson. Porter won the fight via first-round TKO. In his 5th professional fight, Porter faced off against 31 year old Cory Jones (4–3, 1 KO) on February 6, 2009. Porter won the fight after 4 rounds via unanimous decision (40–33, 40–33, 39–35). Jones was knocked down twice in round 1. On April 3, 2009, Porter defeated Eloy Suarez (10–4, 5 KOs) via 1st-round TKO. Porter backed Suarez in a corner, landed several right hand power punches and sent him to the canvas. Suarez beat the count, but was out on his feet. The referee waved a halt at 2:59 of round 1.

In August 2009, Porter moved down to 154 lb, defeating Lamar Harris at the Fitzgerald's Casino & Hotel in Tunica, Mississippi. In December 2009, Porter took on undefeated 27-year-old Jamar Patterson (8–0, 4 KOs) at the Grand Casino in Hinckley, Minnesota, in a scheduled 8-round fight. Porter won the fight after the referee waved off the fight in round 4 after Porter knocked down Patterson.

=== Rise up the ranks ===
Porter won his first Championship belt, the Interim WBO NABO Light Middleweight title against Russell Jordan (15–6, 10 KOs) on ESPN's Friday Night Fights on February 19, 2010. Jordan was deducted a point in 9th round after losing mouthpiece twice as the bout went full 10 rounds. The scorecards read 97–92, 97–92, 100–89. On April 16, 2010, he knocked out veteran Raul Pinzon (17–4, 16 KOs) in just one round. In July, Porter beat 24-year-old Ray Robinson (11–1, 4 KOs) via unanimous decision (99–89, 97–92, 98–91) at DeSoto Civic Center in Southaven, Mississippi.

==== NABF welterweight champion ====
On October 15, 2010, Porter moved down to 147lbs. His first opponent was American Hector Munoz (18–3–4, 11 KOs) at the Buffalo Run Casino in Miami, Oklahoma. It was for the NABF welterweight title, left vacant by Saul Alvarez. Munoz was cut on the right side of his head by a barrage of punches in round 5. During round 9, Porter's promoter, Gary Shaw, ran over to Munoz's corner pleading for them to stop the fight which they finally agreed and threw in the towel at 2:05 of round 9.

On February 18, 2011, Porter successfully defended his title against Anges Adjaho (25–4, 14 KOs) via 10 round unanimous decision (99–91, 99–91, 97–93). The fight was on the undercard of Fernando Guerrero vs. Derrick Findley and was part of the first-ever televised live boxing card in 3D. At 144 lbs, Porter was fighting at the lightest weight of his professional career to date. Adjaho entered having lost four of his previous six bouts and having not won in just over two years.

==== NABO welterweight champion ====
In April 2012, after over a year out, Porter stopped veteran journeyman Patrick Thompson in round 6. Porter claimed the vacant WBO NABO welterweight title by defeating Alfonso Gómez (23–5–2, 12 KOs) on July 28 at the HP Pavilion in San Jose, California. This was the first fight for Gómez since suffering a sixth-round knockout loss to Saul Alvarez (37–0–1) ten months prior. Porter overcame a cut above his right eye in the opening round and a nasty gash in the tenth that spanned his left eyebrow to remain unbeaten. The judges scored the bout 98–92, 96–94, 97–93.

==== Porter vs. Díaz I, II ====
On December 15, Porter fought on the undercard of Khan-Molina at the Sports Arena in Los Angeles against veteran Mexican former world champion Julio Díaz (40–7, 29 KOs). The fight ended in a split decision draw after 10 rounds 96–94, 95–95, 94–96. Porter started the fight well winning the opening few rounds. It appeared as though Díaz was taking the opening rounds to adjust to Porter's style as he started to attack following the fourth round with body shots, which landed accurately.

On May 18, 2013, Porter fought undefeated Canadian Phil Lo Greco (25–0, 14 KOs) at the Boardwalk Hall in Atlantic City. Porter won the fight after 10 rounds winning a unanimous decision 99–89, 100–88, 100–88.

On August 18, 2013, it was announced that Porter would be part of a triple header on Fox Sports 2 on September 12, headlining against Julio Díaz (40–8–1, 29 KOs) in a rematch. Porter improved his record to 22–0–1 after defeating Díaz by decision, retaining the NABO title and winning the vacant IBF North American title as a result. At the end of 10 rounds, the judges scored it (97–93, 98–92, 97–93). Although it was still a tough fight, Porter put the work in and beat Díaz convincingly.

=== IBF welterweight champion ===
==== Porter vs. Alexander ====
In October 2013, it was announced that Porter would challenge IBF Welterweight Champion Devon Alexander (25–1, 14 KOs) on November 30 at the Freeman Coliseum in San Antonio. Alexander was thought to be making his second title defense against England's Amir Khan but Instead had to settle for facing Porter in a much lower-profile bout. Alexander and Porter had met in the amateurs in the late 1990s, with Alexander winning a 3-round decision. The fight took place on December 7 at the Barclays Center in Brooklyn. Porter controlled most of the fight, beating Alexander via a unanimous decision to win the welterweight world title. The judges scored the bout 116–112, 116–112 and 115–113. ESPN.com also had Porter winning 117–111. Porter was delighted to capture his first world title, "We worked hard and it came through in the ring. We made it look easy tonight. This is a blessing. We wanted to come out here and establish that I was the better fighter and we made that happen." In the fight, Porter suffered a damaged right eye due to accidental clash of heads.

==== Porter vs. Malignaggi ====
Golden Boy announced on March 12, 2014, Porter would defend his newly won world title on April 19, against former world welterweight champion Paulie Malignaggi (33–5, 7 KOs) on the undercard of Bernard Hopkins vs. Beibut Shumenov at the DC Armory in Washington. Porter entered as the # 6 welterweight contender in the world according to The Ring Magazine. Malignaggi was ranked as the # 8 contender. Porter won via 4th-round TKO. A double jab opened a cut under the left eye of Malignaggi in round one. Porter had a huge second round, badly rocking Malignaggi multiple times. In round four, Porter hurt Malignaggi with a lunging left hook moments later and a barrage, which included a couple of clean right hands which sent Malignaggi down and under the bottom rope. The referee waved an end to the bout without beginning a count. In the post fight, Porter said, "The objective was to use the jab and get to the body, and it all worked. The first knockdown, he knew that right hand was going to come all night. [In the fourth round], it was a big right hand. He knew it would land all night. We kept throwing it." Malignaggi was humble in defeat, "He has potential to be great, and I told him to go be great I'm not sure what I'm going to do. I don't want to lose to an average champion. I want to lose to a great champion. If this is my last fight, I hope I lost to a great champion."

==== Porter vs. Brook ====
Porter was ordered by the IBF to make his next mandatory defense against Kell Brook (32–0, 22 KOs). The fight took place on August 16, 2014, at the StubHub Center in Carson, California. Brook defeated Porter for the title via 12 round majority decision. Two American judges scored it (117–111 and 116–112) for Brook while the English judge scored it (114–114). Brook landed 158 of his 441 punches (36%), mostly jabs. Porter threw 308 more power punches, in total landing 156 of 626 thrown (25%). Porter felt as though he won the fight, "I thought that I was effective with my attack, but he was ready. I'm not giving any excuses. I want the rematch. I'll find him where he's at, and I'll take it from him." This was a Showtime debut for Porter. The fight did not generate as many viewers as expected, an average of 661,000 viewers. The whole card averaged just 514,000 viewers.

=== Rebuild after first loss ===
==== Porter vs. Bone ====
On March 13, 2015, Porter was scheduled to make his debut as a part of the Premier Boxing Champions series on Spike TV against veteran Roberto García. The fight took place in Ontario, California, at the Citizens Business Bank Arena. Garcia was hospitalized with an undisclosed illness prior to the weigh-in and was forced to withdraw. However, things came together and Erick Bone (16–1, 8 KOs) stepped in to face Porter on short notice at a contractually agreed-upon weight of 149lbs. Porter got off to a slow start to feel what Boné would offer. Boné was able to counter due to Porters reckless boxing. Porter then began to aim for the midsection, landing power shots, eventually dropping Boné in round 5. Boné got up but Porter went on the attack again dropping Boné once again. Clearly hurt, referee Jack Reiss made the 10 count. Porter admitted he had worked on the body shots in training, "I felt the body punches going in, I knew he was getting hurt. I knew it was gonna get him out. We focused on that in the gym."

==== Porter vs. Broner ====
On May 16, 2015, TGB Promotions and Mayweather Promotions announced that Porter would fight fellow Ohio boxer Adrien Broner (30–1, 22 KOs) on June 20 at the MGM Grand Grand Garden Arena in Las Vegas on Premier Boxing Champions on NBC at a catchweight of 144lbs as per Broner's demand. Going into the fight, Broner was 4–0 at the arena. There was controversy around the catchweight. Leading up the fight the Welterweight champ Porter also criticized, that Broner had a 157lbs limit clause in the contract, which stopped Porter from rehydrating to his normal weight on fight day. Porter was quoted as saying,“You want to move up into my weight, then move up! Don’t be scared. Don’t be worried. Don’t be afraid. Put your skill on the line along with your record. Put it all on the line at 147. Don’t put it at 144, then not want to talk about it.” The remarks came as Broner had repeatedly refused to comment on the catchweight situation, which many believed would put Broner in a negative light. Porter dominated majority of the fight to win a unanimous decision over Broner. Broner was warned many times for holding during the bout and was deducted a point in round 11. Broner opened the 12th round with a clean left hand that connected and dropped Porter for the first time in his career. Porter recovered from the knockdown and improved his record to 26–1–1 despite the usual pre-fight trash talk by Broner. The 3 judges scored the bout 114–112, 118–108, 115–111. The fight drew close to 2.4 million viewers. Broner had a purse of $1.35 million compared to Porter's $1 million.

==== Porter vs. Thurman ====
It was announced on February 17, that WBA welterweight champion Keith Thurman (26–0 (1), 22 KOs) would put his title on the line against Porter on March 12, 2016, at the Mohegan Sun Casino in Uncasville, Connecticut. On February 23, Thurman's promoter said he had been forced to postpone his upcoming fight with Porter after being injured in a car accident. Lou DiBella had insisted the injury is not serious or career threatening, but admits the American is lucky to have escaped major injury. Thurman had not been cleared to resume training by his doctors and is expected to be on the sidelines for between four and six weeks. Porter announced that his rescheduled world title clash against Thurman will take place on June 25 at the Barclays Center. The World Boxing Association has ordered the winner of the Thurman and Porter to face interim WBA Welterweight champion David Avanesyan (22–1–1, 11 KOs), who beat #3 WBA Shane Mosley (49–10–1, 41 KOs) on May 28.

In an old-fashioned fight of the year candidate, Porter was unsuccessful in winning the title as Thurman won by unanimous decision, before a crowd of 12,718, when all three judges scored an identical 115–113 in favor of Thurman. Porter earned a $1m purse. This was the first main event televised by CBS in prime time since February 15, 1978, when Muhammad Ali lost a 15-round split decision and the heavyweight title to Leon Spinks in a massive upset. Thurman landed 235 of 539 punches (44 percent) and Porter landed 236 of 662 (36 percent). After the fight, there were immediate talks of a rematch. The fight averaged 3.1 million viewers, according to ESPN. The card itself averaged 2.4 million viewers. The live gate was over $1.1 million in ticket sales, the highest gate in the history of Barclays Center to date, it was also the second highest attendance in the history of Barclays Center, with over 12,000 paying customers in attendance. Premier Boxing Champions voted the bout as their 'Fight of the Year'.

==== Porter vs. Berto ====
On February 13, 2017, it was announced that a deal was close to being made between Porter and former Welterweight world champion Andre Berto (31–4, 24 KOs). On March 5, it was officially confirmed the fight would take place on April 22, 2017, at the Barclays Center in New York City with CBS confirming Showtime would televise the bout. Halfway through the press conference, promoter Lou DiBella confessed that he received a phone call from WBC president Mauricio Sulaiman and he reported the fight would be a final eliminator. On March 4, Keith Thurman defeated Danny Garcia to become the new WBA and WBC unified Welterweight champion.

In front of 9,118, Porter earned another world title fight against Thurman after he stopped Berto inside the distance. Porter used power shots to the body of Berto to wear him down over the rounds. Berto was dropped in round 2, the same round Porter suffered a bad cut from clash of heads. After round 4, Porter was cut above both eyes and Berto was cut above the left eye, all due to clash of heads. Porter dropped Berto once again in round 9, forcing the stoppage. At the time of stoppage, Porter was ahead on all scorecards, 79–72 and 78–74 (twice). Porter was the busier fighter, landing 175 of 448 (39%) punches thrown, whilst Berto landed 81 of 254 thrown (32%). Many experts called the fight dirty due to constant clash of heads and blood pouring from both fighters. Porter said, "My intention is never to use my head as a weapon. This was a just very hard-fought battle by both of us and I'm blessed to get the victory."

Porter earned $1 million whilst Berto got the higher amount of $1.2 million for the fight. The fight averaged 468,000 viewers on Showtime.

==== Porter vs. Granados ====
Due to Keith Thurman being sidelined for the remainder of 2017, on July 17 the WBC president Mauricio Sulaiman told ESPN Deportes, that he would likely order a fight between the #1 Porter and #2 Danny Garcia (33–1, 19 KOs) for the Interim WBC title. He also went on to state, if Porter or García declined to take part in the interim title fight, he would move on to the next highest available ranked fighter. At that time, Manny Pacquiao was #3, Jessie Vargas was #4 and Konstantin Ponomarev was ranked #5 by the WBC. A day later, Porter added fuel to the speculation when he called out García in a WWE-esque promo on social media, "I just heard that the WBC will ask Showtime Shawn Porter to fight another title eliminator. And they want me to fight none other than the cherry picker himself - Danny Garcia. What I say to you Danny Garcia - let's get it on," Porter claimed the ball was now in García's court.

On July 30, Ringtv announced that Porter would fight on the undercard of the Floyd Mayweather Jr. vs. Conor McGregor undercard at the T-Mobile Arena in Las Vegas, however won't be part of the Showtime PPV card. Instead his fight against 27 year old former light welterweight contender Thomas Dulorme (24–2, 16 KOs), who last fought in a stoppage loss to Terence Crawford in April 2015, would headline the preliminary card on Fox. Porter pulled out of his fight with Dulorme on August 17, 9 days before the fight, due to a death in his family. Mayweather Promotions released a statement confirming 2008 Olympic bronze medalist Yordenis Ugás (19–3, 9 KOs) would take his place in fighting Dulorme. On August 2, 2017, the WBC president confirmed that he still had the intention of ordering the fight between Porter and García for the interim title.

On September 28, ESPN reported that Porter would fight again before the end of the year on the Wilder vs. Stiverne undercard on November 4 at the Barclays Center in New York City against 28 year old Adrían Granados (18–5–2, 12 KOs) in a 10-round bout. Porter praised Granados ahead of the fight, "Against Granados I'm getting into the ring with someone who is very established as an amateur and a professional, has great skills and isn't going to go in there and lay down. That's always going to bring out the best in me."

Before a crowd of 10,924, Porter fought hard to earn a 12-round unanimous decision over Granados to claim the vacant WBC Silver welterweight title. All three judges' scored the fight The judges scored the fight 117–111 in favour of Porter. Porter worked hard and did enough to claim the 10 rounds. Throughout the rounds, although Granados was also effective, Porter switched tactics, notably working on the inside and land some clean shots. Porter faded in the 11th and 12th rounds, and resorted to using movement to preserve his win. Granados had enough energy to withstand any punishment inflicted by Porter. The crowd began to jeer in the final round, usually the more excited rounds, as Porter moved and clinched, rather than thrown punches. At one point in the final round, Porter grabbed gold of Granados to avoid being hit. Granados looked at the crowd and shouted, “He won’t let go of me.” CompuBox Stats showed that Porter was the busier and more accurate boxer, landing 209 of 583 punches thrown (36%), while Granandos landed 166 of 680 thrown (24%). Porter explained the reason he slowed down towards the championship rounds saying, "I hurt my left hand in the sixth round, but I kept using it,. I had to use my jab. It took a toll on me, and by the 10th round I just couldn't throw it anymore." For the win, Porter earned $500,000, while Granados took home a $200,000 purse. Granados thought he won the fight. The fight, which took place on a Showtime averaged 646,000 viewers and peaked at 696,000 viewers.

=== WBC welterweight champion ===
==== Porter vs. García ====
Father and trainer, Ken stated that Porter's next fight would be against WBA and WBC champion Keith Thurman. On April 24, 2018, Thurman vacated his WBC title, forcing the organisation to mandate Porter vs. Danny Garcia for the vacant title. On May 9, the WBC ordered purse bids to take place on May 25 if no agreement had been made, although the WBC president Mauricio Sulaiman confirmed talks were going well and a deal could be finalized before the bids. On the morning of May 25, Tom Brown informed the WBC a deal was in place for the bout to take place, thus the purse bids were cancelled. Brown stated the fight would take place at the Barclays Center in either August or September 2018. On July 24, the long-awaited announcement was finally made confirming the bout to take place at the Barclays Center on September 8, 2018. Before a crowd of 13,058 in attendance, Porter became a two-time world champion after defeating García via unanimous decision. The official scores were 116–112, 115–113, 115–113 in Porter's favour. Porter started off slowly in the first four rounds but then came on in the second half and took over, dominating the remainder of the bout. Both boxers boxed in the first quarter of the fight. Porter had little success in doing this. He then made adjustments and began fighting more on the inside and connecting with body shots. One of Porter's main attributes was the way he doubled his jab. It appeared García slowed down in the second half of the fight. This was likely due to the body attack from Porter. García believed he won the fight, but did not complain about the result. IBF champion Errol Spence Jr. entered the ring during Porter's post-fight interview with Porter stating a fight between the pair would be the 'easiest to make' in boxing. CompuBox stats showed that Porter landed 180 of 742 punches thrown (24%) and García landed with 168 of his 472 thrown (36%). For the fight, Porter earned $1 million and García made $1.2 million. The fight averaged 619,000 viewers and peaked at 690,000 viewers.

==== Porter vs. Ugás ====
On November 13, 2018, it was announced that Porter would make his first defence of his WBC title on March 9, 2019, against 32 year old Cuban contender and Mandatory challender Yordenis Ugás (23–3, 11 KOs). Ugas was ranked #6 by the WBC at the time. Premier Boxing Champions and FOX were due to confirm the announcements, as part of their new partnership via a huge press conference in Los Angeles. Ugás became the mandatory challenger after defeating Argentine boxer Cesar Barrionuevo via a 12-round unanimous decision in what was a final eliminator on the Porter vs. García undercard. Prior to the fight being made, Porter wanted a unification bout against Spence. He stated that 'mandatory obligations' came in the way of that bout happening next. The fight was set to take place at the T-Mobile Arena in Paradise, Nevada.

==== Porter vs. Spence Jr. ====
Porter fought Errol Spence Jr. on September 28, 2019, with Porter's WBC and Spence's IBF welterweight titles on the line. In a high-octane fight in which both men fought in the pocket, Porter started fast, sometimes overwhelming Spence Jr. in the early rounds. Spence Jr., however, began attacking Porter's body and was able to slowly gain a slight edge on the judges' scorecards. With the fight still close, Spence Jr. landed a short left hook to Porter's chin in round eleven, causing Porter's glove to touch the canvas and scoring the only knockdown of the fight. Porter remained on his feet and received an eight-count by referee Jack Reiss before resuming the contest, finishing the round, and engaging in an action-packed twelfth and final round. Porter lost by split decision with the judges scoring the bout 116–111, 116–111, 112–115. It was arguably a fight of the year candidate.

=== Post-title career ===
==== Porter vs. Formella ====
On August 22, 2020, Porter made his first appearance back in the ring since losing his WBC title in a bout against undefeated former IBO welterweight champion Sebastian Formella. Formella was ranked #8 by the IBF and #14 by the WBC. Porter dominated the fight, winning every round on all three judges' scorecards, with final scores of 120–108 across the board for a unanimous decision victory.

==== Porter vs. Crawford ====
On July 31, 2021, the WBO ordered their welterweight champion Terence Crawford to defend his title against Porter, the #2 ranked WBO welterweight contender. As the two sides were unable to negotiate the terms of the fight, the WBO set a purse bid for September 2, 2021, which was later postponed until September 14. Crawford and Porter would adhere to a 60–40 purse split, rather than the usual 80–20 split for mandated matches, taking into account the earnings from their three previous fights. On September 14, 2021, it was announced that a deal had been agreed to stage the fight on November 20 at Michelob Ultra Arena in Las Vegas, airing on ESPN+ PPV. Porter lost the bout via tenth-round technical knockout after being knocked down twice in the tenth round, prompting his corner to pull him from the fight.

=== Retirement ===
At the post fight press conference after the Crawford fight Porter announced his retirement from boxing, stating, "I was prepared to announce my retirement tonight, win, lose or draw. Even if it was a draw. I was not going to do it again. I'm announcing my retirement right now".

== Broadcasting career ==
While still fighting at the top level in the welterweight division, Porter became a rising star in the boxing commentary field. He was a primary commentator for NBC's Ring City USA, plus the 2020 Summer Olympics boxing coverage. He's also worked on the broadcast team for Premier Boxing Champions' bouts on Fox, Fox Sports 1, and Fox Sports 2 and Triller Fite Club.

In 2020, Porter launched The Porter Way Podcast, a weekly podcast he hosts with two co-hosts that focuses on boxing and the world of sports.

== Professional boxing record ==
36 fights	31 wins	4 losses
By knockout	17	1
By decision	13	3
By disqualification	1	0
Draws	1	

No.	Result	Record	Opponent	Type	Round, time	Date	Location	Notes
36	Loss	31–4–1	Terence Crawford	TKO	10 (12), 1:21	Nov 20, 2021	Michelob Ultra Arena, Paradise, Nevada, U.S.	For WBO welterweight title
35	Win	31–3–1	Sebastian Formella	UD	12	Aug 22, 2020	Microsoft Theater, Los Angeles, California, U.S.	Won vacant WBC Silver welterweight title
34	Loss	30–3–1	Errol Spence Jr.	SD	12	Sep 28, 2019	Staples Center, Los Angeles, California, U.S.	Lost WBC welterweight title; For IBF welterweight title
33	Win	30–2–1	Yordenis Ugás	SD	12	Mar 9, 2019	Dignity Health Sports Park, Carson, California, U.S.	Retained WBC welterweight title
32	Win	29–2–1	Danny Garcia	UD	12	Sep 8, 2018	Barclays Center, New York City, New York, U.S.	Won vacant WBC welterweight title
31	Win	28–2–1	Adrián Granados	UD	12	Nov 4, 2017	Barclays Center, New York City, New York, U.S.	Won vacant WBC Silver welterweight title
30	Win	27–2–1	Andre Berto	TKO	9 (12), 1:31	Apr 22, 2017	Barclays Center, New York City, New York, U.S.	
29	Loss	26–2–1	Keith Thurman	UD	12	Jun 25, 2016	Barclays Center, New York City, New York, U.S.	For WBA welterweight title
28	Win	26–1–1	Adrien Broner	UD	12	Jun 20, 2015	MGM Grand Garden Arena, Paradise, Nevada, U.S.	
27	Win	25–1–1	Erick Bone	KO	5 (10), 2:30	Mar 13, 2015	Citizens Business Bank Arena, Ontario, California, U.S.	
26	Loss	24–1–1	Kell Brook	MD	12	Aug 16, 2014	StubHub Center, Carson, California, U.S.	Lost IBF welterweight title
25	Win	24–0–1	Paulie Malignaggi	TKO	4 (12), 1:14	Apr 19, 2014	D.C. Armory, Washington, D.C., U.S.	Retained IBF welterweight title
24	Win	23–0–1	Devon Alexander	UD	12	Dec 7, 2013	Barclays Center, New York City, New York, U.S.	Won IBF welterweight title
23	Win	22–0–1	Julio Díaz	UD	10	Sep 12, 2013	MGM Grand Marquee Ballroom, Paradise, Nevada, U.S.	Retained NABO welterweight title; Won vacant IBF North American welterweight title
22	Win	21–0–1	Phil Lo Greco	UD	10	May 18, 2013	Boardwalk Hall, Atlantic City, New Jersey, U.S.	
21	Draw	20–0–1	Julio Díaz	SD	10	Dec 15, 2012	Memorial Sports Arena, Los Angeles, California, U.S.	
20	Win	20–0	Alfonso Gómez	UD	10	Jul 28, 2012	HP Pavilion, San Jose, California, U.S.	Won vacant NABO welterweight title
19	Win	19–0	Patrick Thompson	TKO	6 (8), 1:39	Apr 28, 2012	Boardwalk Hall, Atlantic City, New Jersey, U.S.	
18	Win	18–0	Agnes Adjaho	UD	10	Feb 18, 2011	Wicomico Youth and Civic Center, Salisbury, Maryland, U.S.	Retained NABF welterweight title
17	Win	17–0	Hector Munoz	TKO	9 (10), 2:05	Oct 15, 2010	Buffalo Run Casino, Miami, Oklahoma, U.S.	Won vacant NABF welterweight title
16	Win	16–0	Ray Robinson	UD	10	Jul 16, 2010	DeSoto Civic Center, Southaven, Mississippi, U.S.	
15	Win	15–0	Robert Kliewer	TKO	5 (8), 1:08	May 22, 2010	Fitzgeralds Casino and Hotel, Tunica Resorts, Mississippi, U.S.	
14	Win	14–0	Raúl Pinzón	KO	1 (8), 2:39	Apr 16, 2010	Wicomico Youth and Civic Center, Salisbury, Maryland, U.S.	
13	Win	13–0	Russell Jordan	UD	10	Feb 19, 2010	Wolstein Center, Cleveland, Ohio, U.S.	Won NABO interim junior middleweight title
12	Win	12–0	Jamar Patterson	TKO	4 (8), 1:54	Dec 18, 2009	Grand Casinos, Hinckley, Minnesota, U.S.	
11	Win	11–0	Jerome Ellis	RTD	4 (8), 3:00	Nov 21, 2009	Fitzgeralds Casino and Hotel, Tunica Resorts, Mississippi, U.S.	
10	Win	10–0	Lamar Harris	TKO	1 (6), 2:18	Aug 29, 2009	Fitzgeralds Casino and Hotel, Tunica Resorts, Mississippi, U.S.	
9	Win	9–0	Brandon Wooten	TKO	1 (6), 2:09	Jun 19, 2009	Wicomico Youth and Civic Center, Salisbury, Maryland, U.S.	
8	Win	8–0	Sam Sparkman	DQ	2 (6), 3:00	Apr 25, 2009	Fitzgeralds Casino and Hotel, Tunica Resorts, Mississippi, U.S.	Sparkman disqualified after his cornermen refused to leave the ring
7	Win	7–0	Eloy Suarez	TKO	1 (4), 2:59	Apr 3, 2009	Pepsi Pavilion, Memphis, Tennessee, U.S.	
6	Win	6–0	Abdias Castillo	TKO	4 (4), 1:43	Mar 14, 2009	Fitzgeralds Casino and Hotel, Tunica Resorts, Mississippi, U.S.	
5	Win	5–0	Cory Jones	UD	4	Feb 6, 2009	Wicomico Youth and Civic Center, Salisbury, Maryland, U.S.	
4	Win	4–0	Tommy Stepp	KO	1 (4), 1:55	Jan 24, 2009	Fitzgeralds Casino and Hotel, Tunica Resorts, Mississippi, U.S.	
3	Win	3–0	Phillip Hammac	TKO	2 (4), 1:30	Nov 22, 2008	Fitzgeralds Casino and Hotel, Tunica Resorts, Mississippi, U.S.	
2	Win	2–0	Toris Smith	TKO	1 (4), 0:53	Nov 1, 2008	West Junior High School, West Memphis, Arkansas, U.S.	
1	Win	1–0	Norman Johnson	TKO	1 (4), 1:17	Oct 3, 2008	Wicomico Youth and Civic Center, Salisbury, Maryland, U.S.	

== Pay-per-view bouts ==
United States
No.	Date	Fight	Billing	Buys	Network	Revenue
1	September 28, 2019	Spence Jr. vs. Porter	Spence Jr. vs. Porter	350,000	Fox Sports	$26,250,000
2	November 20, 2021	Crawford vs. Porter	Crawford vs. Porter	135,000	ESPN	$9,448,650
	Total			485,000		$35,698,650

Sporting positions
Amateur boxing titles
Previous: Edwin Rodríguez	U.S. Golden Gloves middleweight champion 2007	Next: Denis Douglin
Regional boxing titles
Preceded by Russell Jordan	NABO junior middleweight champion Interim title February 19, 2010 – April 2010; Vacated	Vacant Title next held by Vanes Martirosyan
Vacant Title last held by Canelo Álvarez	NABF welterweight champion October 15, 2010 – February 2012; Vacated	Vacant Title next held by Thomas Dulorme
Vacant Title last held by Mike Jones	NABO welterweight champion July 28, 2012 – December 2013; Vacated	Vacant Title next held by Ray Robinson
New title	IBF North American welterweight champion February 12, 2013 – December 7, 2013; Won world title	Vacant Title next held by Eddie Gomez
Vacant Title last held by Kudratillo Abdukakhorov	WBC Silver welterweight champion November 4, 2017 – March 2018; Vacated	Vacant Title next held by Kudratillo Abdukakhorov
Vacant Title last held by Sebastian Formella	WBC Silver welterweight champion August 22, 2020 – November 20, 2021; Retired	Vacant
World boxing titles
Preceded by Devon Alexander	IBF welterweight champion December 7, 2013 – August 16, 2014	Succeeded by Kell Brook
Vacant Title last held by Keith Thurman	WBC welterweight champion September 8, 2018 – September 28, 2019	Succeeded by Errol Spence Jr.
Awards
Previous: Francisco Vargas vs. Takashi Miura	The Ring Fight of the Year vs. Keith Thurman; 2016	Next: Anthony Joshua vs. Wladimir Klitschko
Previous: Krzysztof Głowacki vs. Marco Huck	PBC Fight of the Year vs. Keith Thurman; 2016	Next: James DeGale vs. Badou Jack
