= Errol Spence Jr. vs. Mikey Garcia =

Boxing match

- Date: March 16, 2019
- Venue: AT&T Stadium, Arlington, Texas, U.S.
- Title(s) on the line: IBF welterweight title

Tale of the tape
Boxer	Errol Spence Jr.	Mikey Garcia
Nickname	"The Truth"	
Hometown	Dallas, Texas, U.S.	Ventura, California, U.S.
Purse	$3,000,000	$3,000,000
Pre-fight record	24–0 (21 KO)	39–0 (30 KO)
Age	29 years	31 years, 3 months
Height	5 ft 9 in (175 cm)	5 ft 6 in (168 cm)
Weight	146 1/4 lb (66 kg)	145 1/2 lb (66 kg)
Style	Southpaw	Orthodox
Recognition	IBF; Welterweight Champion; The Ring/TBRB; No. 1 Ranked Welterweight; The Ring No. 10 ranked pound-for-pound fighter	WBC; Lightweight Champion; The Ring/TBRB; No. 2 Ranked Lightweight; The Ring No. 7 ranked pound-for-pound fighter 4-division world champion

Result
- Spence defeated Garcia by unanimous decision

Errol Spence Jr. vs. Mikey Garcia was a professional boxing match contested on March 16, 2019, for the IBF welterweight championship.

== Background ==
Since winning the IBF welterweight title against Kell Brook, Errol Spence Jr. has made two stoppage defences against Lamont Peterson and Carlos Ocampo. He was ranked by both Ring magazine and TBRB as the best welterweight in the world.

After successfully unifying the WBC and IBF lightweight titles in against Robert Easter Jr. July 2018, Mikey Garcia reiterated his desire to fight Spence Jr. by the end of 2018. Spence, who was sat ringside also admitted the fight was too big to turn down and would not be hard to make.

In October 2018, it was reported that negotiations between Spence and Garcia were progressing, with the fight likely to take place in February 2019 on Showtime PPV. On October 30, Garcia vacated his IBF lightweight title and the purse bid for the potential Richard Commey fight was cancelled. On November 13, PBC made an official announcement that the fight between Spence and Garcia would take place at the AT&T Stadium in Arlington, Texas on March 16, 2019, to be broadcast by FOX PPV. This would be the first PPV headliner for both Spence and Garcia. Spence was a 1/4 favourite.

== The fight ==
Spence would completely outclass and dominate Garcia, using his superior reach to constantly land jabs to the head and body from a distance, landing 108 over the course of the fight. Garcia would try to close the distance, but with Spence's weight and height advantage, he was able to completely dominate Garcia even in the pocket. In rounds 8 and 9, Spence landed over 100 punches in two rounds, constantly using lead hooks and uppercuts on the increasing backing up Garcia. Despite being dominated Garcia would show heart and made it to the final bell. All three judges would score every round for Spence with one giving the 11th as a 10–8 round, with scorecards reading 120–107, 120–108 and 120–108.

== Aftermath ==
After the fight, Spence was joined in the ring by eight-division champion Manny Pacquiao. Both stated that they would love to fight each other next. Garcia would express no regrets for taking the fight with Spence saying "In order to leave a lasting impression, to cement your name, you have to go after the biggest challenges and the biggest fights, if I want to protect the record and just fight contenders, make a quick paycheck and keep racking up wins, that's not going to be something to be remembered. I don't want that. I made it a goal to fight the biggest fights and take the biggest challenges so that people can appreciate who I am as a fighter, and that's why I took on this fight. I wanted to establish that legacy. I was trying to be great. That's what a world champion needs to be doing, giving the greatest fights available."

== Reception ==
A crowd of 47,525 attended the event, generating a live gate of $5 million. According to ESPN, FOX's first PPV sold over 360,000 buys, possibly up to 380,000 buys, generating a minimum $27 million domestically. It was considered a success considering PBC's recent PPV's and the fact it was a PPV debut for both boxers. Garcia and Spence had a base purse of $3 million, up to $8 million based on PPV sales.

== Undercard ==
Confirmed bouts:

Winner	Loser	Weight division/title belt(s) disputed	Result
(United States) José Valenzuela	(Puerto Rico) Christian Velez	Lightweight (4 rounds)	4th round KO
PPV bouts
(United States) David Benavidez	(United States) J'Leon Love	Super middleweight (10 rounds)	2nd round KO
(Mexico) Lindolfo Delgado	(United States) James Roach	Light Welterweight (6 rounds)	1st round KO
(Mexico) Luis Nery	(Puerto Rico) McJoe Arroyo	Bantamweight (10 rounds)	4th round RTD
(United States) Chris Arreola	(United States) Jean-Pierre Augustin	Heavyweight (10 rounds)	3rd round TKO
Preliminary bouts
(United States) Charles Martin	(United States) Gregory Corbin	Heavyweight (10 rounds)	8th round DQ
(Mexico) Fernando Garcia	(Colombia) Marlon Olea	Super Bantamweight (8 rounds)	5th round KO
(United States) Amon Rashidi	(United States) Gabriel Gutierrez	Light Welterweight (6 rounds)	6th round TKO
(United States) Marsellos Wilder	(Mexico) Mark Sanchez	Cruiserweight (4 rounds)	No contest
(United States) Jesse Rodriguez	(Azerbaijan) Rauf Aghayev	Flyweight (8 rounds)	3rd round TKO
(United States) Thomas Hill	(United States) Limberth Ponce	Light Middleweight (6 rounds)	Split decision
(United States) Aaron Morales	(United States) Fernando Robles	Bantamweight (6 rounds)	Unanimous decision
(United States) Adrian Taylor	(United States) William Deets	Cruiserweight (4 rounds)	Unanimous decision
(United States) Luis Coria	(Mexico) Omar Garcia	Lightweight (6 rounds)	2nd round TKO
(United States) Burley Brooks	(United States) Randy Mast	Super middleweight (4 rounds)	1st round TKO
(United States) Robert Rodriguez	(United States) Fernando Ibarra De Anda	Super Flyweight (4 rounds)	Unanimous decision

== Broadcasting ==
Country	Broadcaster
Panama	Telemetro
United Kingdom	ITV
United States	FOX Sports

Preceded by vs. Carlos Ocampo	Errol Spence Jr.'s bouts 16 March 2019	Succeeded by vs. Shawn Porter
Preceded by vs. Robert Easter Jr.	Mikey Garcia's bouts 16 March 2019	Succeeded by vs. Jessie Vargas
