= Noel Dolton =

Australian rugby league footballer (1936-2021)

Personal information
- Full name: Noel Frank Dolton
- Born: 22 December 1936
- Died: 5 December 2021 (aged 84)

Playing information
- Position: Prop, Second-row
Club
Years	Team	Pld	T	G	FG	P
1959–62	Newtown	32	6	0	0	18
1962–64	Parramatta	50	2	0	0	6
1964–66	Wakefield Trinity	24	1	0	0	3
1967–68	Western Suburbs	16	0	0	0	0
	Total	122	9	0	0	27
Representative
Years	Team	Pld	T	G	FG	P
1965	Commonwealth XIII

Noel Dolton (birth unknown), also known by the nickname "Tombstone", is an Australian former professional rugby league footballer who played in the 1950s and 1960s. He played at representative level for Commonwealth XIII, and at club level for Newtown, Parramatta, Wakefield Trinity and the Western Suburbs Magpies as a prop or second-row.

== International honours ==
=== Playing career ===
Noel Dolton represented Commonwealth XIII while at Wakefield Trinity in 1965 against New Zealand at Crystal Palace National Recreation Centre, London on Wednesday 18 August 1965.

=== Club career ===
Noel Dolton made his debut for Wakefield Trinity during December 1964, and he played his last match for Wakefield Trinity during the 1965–66 season
