= Temba, South Africa =

Temba
- Location within Gauteng Location within South Africa
- Coordinates: 25.4°S 28.26°E
- Country: South Africa
- Province: Gauteng
- Municipality: City of Tshwane

Area
  - Total: 21.81 km^{2} (8.42 sq mi)

Population (2011)
  - Total: 58,431
  - Density: 2,679/km^{2} (6,939/sq mi)

Racial makeup (2011)
  - Black African: 99.0%
  - Coloured: 0.3%
  - Indian/Asian: 0.2%
  - White: 0.1%
  - Other: 0.4%

First languages (2011)
  - Tswana: 49.4%
  - Northern Sotho: 15.6%
  - Tsonga: 11.5%
  - S. Ndebele: 7.1%
  - Other: 16.3%
- Time zone: UTC+2 (SAST)
- Postal code (street): 0407
- PO box: 0407
- Area code: 012

Temba is a town in City of Tshwane Metropolitan Municipality in the Gauteng province of South Africa.

Temba is divided into the following units

- Kudube Unit 1
- Manyeleti
- Unit D
- Unit D ( exts.)
- Unit 5
- Unit 7
- Leboneng

== History ==
Temba is located in the greater Hammanskraal area which includes Mahube and Mathibestad. Tswana speaking people have lived in the area known as Temba from the 1700s. In the mid 18th century, Amandebele-a-Moletlane (changed to Amandebele a Lebelo in the 1990s)settled in the area known as Leeuwkraal 396 among groups of Tswana-speaking people. The main patriarchs of this Ndebele clan were the Kekana confederacy. The Kekana clan remains the dominant Ndebele authority over the Leeuwkraal Area in Hammanskraal, but the Tswana-speaking people of the area primarily form part of the Bakgatla and the Bakwena groups. The arrival of Europeans in the late 19th century created demarcated traditional area's with tribal foundations. The Land Act of 1913 also limited the expansion of the area.

The Amandebele-A-Moletlane were used to farming and grazing cattle on extensive pieces of land and soon they had too little to provide for the lively hoods of their people in the space of growing populations wherein they couldn't expand on their territorial vicinity.

In the 1940s, the Transvaal brought people in trucks from Orlando, Klipsruit and Lady Selbourne and a town of Sofasonke emerged. Sofasonke is Nguni for "We shall die together". The chief of the Kekana was requested by the Transvaal Government to allow the people to use their schools, churches and facilities. In the 1950s the tent town was developed into a space of permanent structures. Furthermore, tribal authorities, the state, and private businessmen invested money in a grand plan to house large numbers of migrant workers. This new development was seen as a new glimmer of hope. It was subsequently renamed to the Nguni name place of hope Temba.

In the mid 1970s, the area fell under the Bophuthatswana homeland government. The territory of Temba formed part of the North Eastern block of the Bophuthatswana which was the most densely populated part of the entire province. The reason why Temba formed part of Bophuthatswana is due to the fact that the majority of the people in the area were Tswana speaking people of the Bakwena and the Bakgatla clans.

Temba is functionally connected to the city of Pretoria by the old Warmbaths road and subsequently the N1 highway. As a result, it has become a largely dormant town with the majority of its residents commuting long distances to get access to employment. Unlike other townships in Gauteng, the area does not have access to a sophisticated railway network and as a result, transport for most of the people remains largely by means of buses, private cars and minibus taxis.

The area has a mixed housing system with a third of the houses being supplied by the Apartheid governments subsidized rental housing system. Many of the houses in the territory are part of the free title stands. This is the result of the Ndebele cultural influence in the territory. The Ndebele are a proud people and have a great sense of pride in home ownership and focus culturally on individual identity. As a result, the central neighborhood of Manyleti among others are filled with free title stands with large houses built by the locals.

== Education ==
=== Primary schools ===
- Kudube Primary School
- Refitlhile Primary School
- Lefofa Primary School
- Mosaledi Primary School
- Itireleng Primary School
- Reneilwe Primary School
- Tsebe Ya Ntlha Primary School
- Mamotse Primary School
- Leboneng Primary School
- Masakhane Primary School
- Selang Primary School

=== Secondary schools ===
- Makgetse Secondary School
- Kgetse Ya Tsie Secondary School
- Ratshepo Secondary School
- Sikhululekile Secondary School
- P.H.L Morake Secondary
- Madisong Secondary School

=== Tertiary ===
Tshwane North College
