= Mahonri Montes =

Mexican boxer (born 1989)

Personal information
- Nickname: Rusito
- Born: Mahonry Montes Castillo; 18 November 1989 (age 36) Los Mochis, Sinaloa, Mexico
- Height: 1.78 m (5 ft 10 in)
- Weight: Super Featherweight

Boxing career
- Reach: 178 cm (70 in)
- Stance: Orthodox

Boxing record
- Total fights: 47
- Wins: 36
- Win by KO: 25
- Losses: 10
- Draws: 1
- No contests: 0

Mahonry Montes Castillo (born 18 November 1989) is a Mexican professional boxer of Russian descent.

== Professional career ==
On 25 July 2008 Montes beat veteran Trinidad Mendoza to win the WBC FECARBOX super featherweight title.

== Professional boxing record ==
48 fights	36 wins	10 losses
By knockout	25	4
By decision	11	6
Draws	2	

No.	Result	Record	Opponent	Type	Round, time	Date	Location	Notes
48	Draw	36–10–2	Jesús Valenzuela	SD	8	1 April 2023	Guasave, Sinaloa, Mexico	
47	Loss	36–10–1	Gor Yeritsyan	KO	6 (8), 0:18	3 December 2020	Wild Card Boxing, Los Angeles, California, U.S.	
46	Win	36–9–1	Rubén León Medina	KO	3 (6), 1:37	15 August 2019	Arena Big Star Boxing, Guasave, Mexico	
45	Loss	35–9–1	Chris van Heerden	TD	6 (8), 1:44	23 March 2019	The Hangar, Costa Mesa, California, U.S.	Unanimous TD: van Herdeen cut from accidental headbutt
44	Loss	35–8–1	Jamal James	KO	2 (10), 2:58	24 August 2018	Armory, Minneapolis, Minnesota, U.S.	
43	Win	35–7–1	Enrique Mercado Gómez	TKO	2 (6), 2:31	27 March 2018	Guasave, Sinaloa, Mexico	
42	Win	34–7–1	Adrián Tostado Reyes	KO	3 (8), 1:12	23 December 2017	Score Sport Bar, Guasave, Mexico	
41	Loss	33–7–1	Egidijus Kavaliauskas	TKO	7 (10), 0:34	22 September 2017	Convention Center, Tucson, Arizona, U.S.	For vacant WBC-NABF welterweight title
40	Win	33–6–1	Francisco Santana	SD	10	22 April 2017	StubHub Center, Carson, California, U.S.	
39	Loss	32–6–1	Keandre Gibson	UD	8	18 November 2016	Fantasy Springs Casino, Indio, California, U.S.	
38	Win	32–5–1	Francisco Javier López Chávez	TKO	3 (6), 2:05	14 October 2016	Score Sport Bar, Guasave, Mexico	
37	Win	31–5–1	Fernando Silva	UD	6	15 August 2015	Estadio de Béisbol Albero Vega Chávez, Guamúchil, Mexico	
36	Loss	30–5–1	Ashley Theophane	SD	10	30 April 2015	Palms Casino Resort, Paradise, Nevada, U.S.	
35	Win	30–4–1	Diego Cruz	PTS	8	4 October 2014	Centro de Usos Múltiples, Los Mochis, Mexico	
34	Loss	29–4–1	Erick Bone	UD	10	22 August 2014	Pechanga Resort & Casino, Temecula, California, U.S.	
33	Win	29–3–1	Jesús Valenzuela	UD	8	22 March 2014	Polideportivo Centenario, Los Mochis, Mexico	
32	Loss	28–3–1	Humberto Soto	UD	12	28 September 2013	Polideportivo, Centenario, Los Mochis, Mexico	For WBC International Silver light welterweight title
31	Win	28–2–1	Daniel Armando Valenzuela	TKO	3 (10)	28 June 2013	Arena California, La Paz, Mexico	
30	Loss	27–2–1	José López	RTD	7 (12), 3:00	23 March 2013	Centro de Espectáculos "La Macarena", Uruapan, Mexico	
29	Win	27–1–1	Gabriel Martínez	UD	8	22 December 2012	Auditorio del Bicentenario, Morelia, Mexico	
28	Win	26–1–1	José López Medina	UD	10	24 August 2012	Estadio Francisco León García, Puerto Peñasco, Mexico	
27	Loss	25–1–1	Silverio Ortiz	UD	8	31 March 2012	Polyforum Zam Ná, Mérida, Mexico	
26	Win	25–0–1	Aarón Domínguez	KO	1 (6)	9 March 2012	Expo Forum, Hermosillo, Mexico	
25	Win	24–0–1	Jorge Pimentel	TKO	4 (10), 2:23	26 November 2011	Plaza de Toros Mea, Mazatlán, Mexico	
24	Win	23–0–1	Carlos Winston Velásquez	TKO	8 (10), 2:42	24 September 2011	Auditorio del Estado, Mexicali, Mexico	
23	Win	22–0–1	Héctor Velázquez	UD	10	25 June 2011	Estadio Banorte, Culiacán, Mexico	
22	Win	21–0–1	Rafael Urías	TKO	2 (10), 2:59	14 May 2011	Polideportivo Centenario, Los Mochis, Mexico	
21	Win	20–0–1	Iván Álvarez	UD	8	18 February 2011	Gimnasio Salvador Mendoza, Navojoa, Mexico	
20	Win	19–0–1	Pedro García	TKO	2 (6)	11 December 2010	Auditorio Municipal, Torreón, Mexico	
19	Win	18–0–1	Derrick Moon	MD	6	7 November 2008	Casino del Sol, Tucson, Arizona, U.S.	
18	Win	17–0–1	Maximiliano Galindo	TKO	5 (6), 0:40	4 September 2008	Bilbao Discoteque, Culiacán, Mexico	
17	Win	16–0–1	Víctor Rodríguez	TKO	3 (8), 2:35	29 August 2008	Auditorio Benito Juárez, Los Mochis, Mexico	
16	Win	15–0–1	Trinidad Mendoza	TKO	7 (12)	25 July 2008	Polideportivo Centenario, Los Mochis, Mexico	Won vacant WBC FECARBOX super featherweight title
15	Win	14–0–1	José Alejandro Hernández	KO	1 (8)	31 May 2008	Plaza de Toros Fermín Rivera, San Luis Potosí, Mexico	
14	Win	13–0–1	Juan Ruiz	TKO	6 (10), 0:50	18 April 2008	Auditorio Benito Juárez, Los Mochis, Mexico	
13	Win	12–0–1	Julio César Acosta	TKO	1 (6), 2:58	29 February 2008	Forum del Mayo, Navojoa, Mexico	
12	Win	11–0–1	Pablo Lugo Montiel	UD	8	8 February 2008	Auditorio Benito Juárez, Los Mochis, Mexico	
11	Win	10–0–1	Antonio Valencia	TKO	4 (8), 0:51	25 January 2008	Auditorio Benito Juárez, Los Mochis, Mexico	
10	Draw	9–0–1	Baladan Trevizo	PTS	6	14 December 2007	Polideportivo Centenario, Los Mochis, Mexico	
9	Win	9–0	Roberto Ventura	TKO	1 (6)	9 November 2007	Centro de Espectáculos Rancho Grande, Mexicali, Mexico	
8	Win	8–0	Édgar Luzanilla	TKO	2 (4)	28 September 2007	Gimnasio Germán Evers, Mazatlán, Mexico	
7	Win	7–0	Antonio Valencia	UD	6	14 September 2007	Centro de Espectáculos Promocasa, Mexicali, Mexico	
6	Win	6–0	Valente Rojas	TKO	2 (6)	22 June 2007	Centro de Usos Múltiples, Huatabampo, Mexico	
5	Win	5–0	Patricio Lugo	KO	1 (4), 0:55	15 June 2007	Parque Vicente Guerrero, Mexicali, Mexico	
4	Win	4–0	Armando Corral	TKO	1 (4), 2:57	4 May 2007	Forum del Mayo, Navojoa, Mexico	
3	Win	3–0	Eduardo Gutiérrez	KO	2 (4), 0:55	30 March 2007	Polideportivo Centenario, Los Mochis, Mexico	
2	Win	2–0	Patricio Lugo	TKO	1 (4), 2:12	22 December 2006	Polideportivo Centenario, Los Mochis, Mexico	
1	Win	1–0	Agapito Ontiveros	KO	1 (4)	6 October 2006	Auditorio Benito Juárez, Los Mochis, Mexico	
