= Errol Spence Jr. vs. Shawn Porter =

Professional boxing match

- Date: September 28, 2019
- Venue: Staples Center, Los Angeles, California, U.S.
- Title(s) on the line: WBC and IBF welterweight titles

Tale of the tape
Boxer	Errol Spence Jr.	Shawn Porter
Nickname	"The Truth"	"Showtime"
Hometown	Dallas, Texas, U.S.	Cleveland, Ohio, U.S.
Pre-fight record	25–0 (21 KO)	30–2–1 (17 KO)
Age	29 years, 6 months	31 years, 11 months
Height	5 ft 9 in (175 cm)	5 ft 7 in (170 cm)
Weight	147 lb (67 kg)	147 lb (67 kg)
Style	Southpaw	Orthodox
Recognition	IBF; Welterweight Champion; The Ring; No. 1 Ranked Welterweight; TBRB; No. 2 Ranked Welterweight; The Ring No. 6 ranked pound-for-pound fighter	WBC; Welterweight Champion; The Ring; No. 4 Ranked Welterweight

Result
- Spence Jr. wins via 12-round split decision (116–111, 112–115, 116–111)

Errol Spence Jr. vs. Shawn Porter was a professional boxing match contested on September 28, 2019, for the WBC and IBF welterweight championship.

Spence Jr. won the fight via split decision, with two scorecards reading 116–111 for Spence Jr., and the third 115–112 for Porter.

== Background ==
The event took place at the Staples Center in Los Angeles, California.

Spence was the 1 to 9 favourite to win, with Porter as a 5 to 1 underdog.

== The fight ==
Spence Jr. and Porter participated in a frenetic encounter from start to finish, with one CBS analyst declaring it a "fight of the year candidate".

Porter started fast, sometimes overwhelming Spence Jr. in the early rounds. Spence Jr., however, began attacking Porter's body and was able to slowly gain a slight edge on the judges' scorecards. With the fight still close, Spence Jr. landed a short left hook to Porter's chin in round eleven, causing Porter's glove to touch the canvas and scoring the only knockdown of the fight. Porter remained on his feet and received an eight-count by referee Jack Reiss before resuming the contest, finishing the round and engaging in an action-packed twelfth and final round.

In the end, Spence Jr. was given a split decision win on the official scorecards, with Filipino judge Rey Danseco and Steve Weisfeld had it 116–111 for him and Larry Hazzard Jr tallied 115–112 for Porter. Spence Jr. won Porter's WBC title and successfully defended his IBF title for the fourth time.

== Fight card ==
Confirmed bouts:

Weight Class		vs.		Method	Round	Time	Notes
Welterweight	(Mexico) Lindolfo Delgado	def.	(Mexico) Jesus Zazueta Anaya	KO	6/6	1:59
PPV bouts
Welterweight	(United States) Errol Spence Jr. (c)	def.	(United States) Shawn Porter (c)	SD	12/12		^{Note 1}
Super middleweight	(United States) David Benavidez	def.	(United States) Anthony Dirrell (c)	KO	9/12	1:39	^{Note 2}
Super lightweight	(United States) Mario Barrios	def.	(Russia) Batyr Akhmedov	UD	12/12		^{Note 3}
Welterweight	(United States) Josesito Lopez	def.	(United States) John Molina Jr.	KO	8/10	0:39
Fox Sports 1 Preliminary bouts
Welterweight	(United States) Robert Guerrero	def.	(United States) Gerald Thomas	UD	10/10
Middleweight	(United States) Joey Spencer	def.	(United States) Travis Gambardella	KO	3/4	0:53
Live Streamed Preliminary bouts
Super featherweight	(United States) José Valenzuela	def.	(United States) Charles Clark	KO	1/4	1:06
Super middleweight	(Mexico) Misael Rodriguez	def.	(United States) Brandon Maddox	KO	3/8	1:13
Welterweight	(Argentina) Fabián Maidana	def.	(Mexico) Ramses Agaton	KO	1/8	2:07
Middleweight	(United States) Leon Lawson III	def.	(Mexico) Alan Zavala	KO	2/8	2:27
Welterweight	(United States) Alfonso Olvera	def.	(United States) Amon Rashidi	UD	8/8
Featherweight	(United States) Juan Antonio Lopez	def.	(Mexico) Fernando Garcia	UD	8/8
Light heavyweight	(United States) Burley Brooks	def.	(Mexico) Fabian Valdez	KO	1/6	2:35

^Note 1 For WBC, and IBF welterweight titles
^Note 2 For WBC super middleweight title
^Note 3 For vacant WBA (Regular) super lightweight title

== Broadcasting ==
The fight was telecast on Fox Sports pay per view in the United States, Sky Sports in the United Kingdom and via FITE TV on pay per view outside of North America.

Country	Broadcaster
United Kingdom	Sky Sports
United States	FOX Sports
Worldwide (unsold markets)	FITE TV

== See also ==
- Felix Trinidad vs. Oscar De La Hoya, another Welterweight unification fight pitting an IBF champion (Trinidad) against a WBC one (De La Hoya), a bit over 20 years to this fight's date.

Preceded by vs. Mikey Garcia	Errol Spence Jr.'s bouts 28 September 2019	Succeeded by vs. Danny Garcia
Preceded by vs. Yordenis Ugás	Shawn Porter's bouts 28 September 2019	Succeeded by vs. Sebastian Formella
