= Javontae Starks =

American boxer

Personal information
- Nationality: American
- Born: March 18, 1989 (age 37) Minneapolis, Minnesota, U.S.
- Height: 6 ft 0 in (183 cm)
- Weight: 154 lb (70 kg)

Boxing career
- Stance: Orthodox

Boxing record
- Wins: 13
- Win by KO: 7
- Losses: 2
- Draws: 1

Javontae Starks (born March 18, 1989) is an American professional boxer from Minneapolis, Minnesota.

== Personal life ==
Starks has received much attention for his comeback from a serious injury. In August 2007 Starks was shot in the leg in his hometown of Minneapolis, and the bullet nicked a major artery. For a time it was uncertain whether he would survive the injury, but having done so Starks has recuperated and returned to competition.

== Amateur boxing career ==
Starks competed as an amateur boxer from 2001 until 2009. Starks represented Circle of Discipline boxing club in Minneapolis. He won his first major championships in 2003, and completed his amateur career having won the following regional and national championships:

- 2002 State Silver Gloves champion
- 2003 Ohio state champion
- 2003 Regional Silver Gloves champion
- 2003 Ringside World Champion
- 2003-2005 State JO champion
- 2003 and 2005 Regional JO Champion
- 2006 Region I Golden Gloves champion
- 2006 Silver Medalist in the Under 19 Tournament
- 2007 Finalist Ringside World Tournament
- 2008 State USA champion
- 2008 Upper Midwest Golden Gloves champion
- 2008 Future Stars national champion
- 2009 Upper Midwest Golden Gloves champion

== Professional boxing career ==
It was announced on October 5, 2009, that Starks had spurned advances from promoters Main Events (New Jersey) and TKO Productions (Las Vegas) to sign a contract with Minnesota promoter, Midwest Sports Council. Starks made his professional debut on November 13, 2009, with a second-round knockout of Dan Copp.
