= Domonique Dolton =

American boxer

Personal information
- Nationality: American
- Born: November 20, 1989 (age 36) Detroit, Michigan
- Height: 5 ft 10 in (178 cm)
- Weight: Welterweight; Light middleweight

Boxing career
- Reach: 70 in (178 cm)
- Stance: Orthodox

Boxing record
- Total fights: 26
- Wins: 22
- Win by KO: 13
- Losses: 30
- Draws: 1
- No contests: 0

Domonique Dorian Dolton (born November 20, 1989) is an American professional boxer.

== Amateur career ==
Dolton lost to Keith Thurman at the 2008 Olympic Trials and missed out on the Olympic games.

== Professional career ==
On April 4, 2008, Dolton won his pro debut by knocking out veteran Derick Minton in the second round. Dolton won the US NABA & WBC FECARBOX middleweight title via split decision win over Donatas Bondoravas.

He was the chief sparring partner of Miguel Cotto, for Cotto's fight with Yuri Foreman at Yankee Stadium in New York City.

== Professional record ==
14 Wins (8 knockouts), 0 Losses, 0 Draw
Res.	Record	Opponent	Type	Rd., Time	Date	Location	Notes
Draw	17–0–1	Oscar Molina	MD	10 (10)	Sep 29, 2015	Palms Casino and Resort, Pearl Theater, Las Vegas, Nevada, U.S.	
Win	17–0	Victor Fonsecas	RTD	5 (8)	Jun 12, 2015	UIC Pavilion, Chicago, Illinois, U.S.	
Win	16–0	Juan Carlos Rojas	UD	6 (6)	Feb 6, 2015	Beau Rivage Resort & Casino, Biloxi, Mississippi, U.S.	
Win	15–0	Jonathan Batista	UD	6 (6)	Nov 14, 2014	CONSOL Energy Center, Pittsburgh, Pennsylvania, U.S.	
Win	14–0	Basilio Silva	TKO	5 (10)	May 24, 2013	Club Maquiteria, Santo Domingo, Dominican Republic	
Win	13–0	Richard Gutierrez	UD	10 (10)	Nov 30, 2012	BB&T Center, Sunrise, Florida, U.S.	vacant WBA Fedelatin light middleweight title
Win	12–0	Jose Soto	TKO	4 (10)	Oct 12, 2012	Club el Millon, Santo Domingo, Dominican Republic	
Win	11–0	Donatas Bondoravas	MD	10 (10)	Jun 4, 2011	Seminole Hard Rock, Hollywood, Florida, U.S.	Won vacant WBC FECARBOX and NABA USA middleweight titles
Win	10–0	Marcos Primera	UD	8 (8)	Jan 22, 2011	The Greenbrier, White Sulphur Springs, West Virginia, U.S.	
Win	9–0	Guy Packer	TKO	2 (1:55)	Nov 12, 2010	Royal Oak Theatre, Royal Oak, Michigan, U.S.	
Win	8–0	Norbert Szekeres	KO	3 (1:17)	Sep 11, 2010	Frankfurt, Germany	
Win	7–0	Jeremiah Jones	TKO	2 (1:55)	Jul 23, 2010	Royal Oak Theatre, Royal Oak, Michigan, U.S.	
Win	6–0	Omar Siala	TKO	3(0:12)	Mar 20, 2010	Esprit Arena, Düsseldorf, Germany	
Win	5–0	Richard Best	UD	4(4)	Aug 29, 2009	QuikTrip Park, Grand Prairie, Texas, U.S.	
Win	4–0	Robert Jones	UD	8(8)	May 1, 2009	DeCarlo Center, Warren, Michigan, U.S.	
Win	3–0	William Thomas	UD	4(4)	Oct 10, 2008	DeCarlo Center, Warren, Michigan, U.S.	
Win	2–0	Deangelo Foster	TKO	1(2:13)	Aug 30, 2008	Cincinnati Gardens, Cincinnati, Ohio, U.S.	
Win	1–0	Derick Minton	TKO	2(2:30)	Apr 4, 2008	Bert's Theatre, Detroit, Michigan, U.S.	
