= Purse bid =

Type of bid

A purse bid is an initial step in arranging a professional boxing match, involving the fight's/card's promoter(s). All interested registered promoters may bid on the amount of the purse (the total money that the fighters will be paid for the match), if the sides representing each fighter fail to agree on it before the deadline. The highest offer wins; however, the winning entity must produce a small percentage of the total amount up-front by a certain date. The purse in a purse bid is split between the fighters according to the preset formulas of the sanctioning commissions. Purse bids are often won by one of the two fighters' promoters.

For championship belt fights under a given sanctioning body (WBC, WBA, WBO, IBF, etc.), the two fighters' (champion and challenger) promoters/managers usually get together to establish an agreement for how much each side will receive. In situations where the two sides can't agree, it will sometimes go to a "purse bid" where the process is opened up to any promoter that would like to put on the fight. They submit bids for how much they're willing to pay in purses and the highest bidder wins the right to put on the fight. In such cases, the champion usually gets a higher percentage and the challenger a lower percentage and the total purse is simply split between the two by formula.

For example, in the summer of 2015 the WBA heavyweight champion was Wladimir Klitschko and the WBA wanted him to fight his mandatory challenger, Tyson Fury. The two sides (K2 Promotions for Klitschko and Mick Hennessey for Fury) were initially unable to come to an agreement on terms for a fight. The WBA then ordered a purse bid, which would have allowed any promoter to submit bids to put the fight on themselves. Just before the purse bid was going to open up, the two sides announced they had come to an agreement and so the purse bid was canceled.

== List of recorded purse bids ==
List of purse bids and winning promoters
Date of the fight	Fight	Winning Bid	Winning Promoter	Losing Bid	Losing Promoter	Sources and notes
22. April 2022	Tyson Fury vs Dillian Whyte	$41,025,000	Queensbery	$32,222,222	Matchroom Boxing	
5 October 2013	Wladimir Klitschko vs Alexander Povetkin	$23,333,330	Vladimir Hryunov	$7,130,000	K2 Promotions	
15 November 2014	Wladimir Klitschko vs Kubrat Pulev	$7,250,000	K2 Promotions	$5,290,000	Sauerland Event	
16 January 2016	Charles Martin vs Yacheslav Glazkov	$1,240,000	Warriors Boxing	$888,000	Main Event	
20 August 2021	Artur Beterbiev vs Marcus Browne	$1,000,005	TopRank	$1,000,0001	TGB Promotions	
To be determined	Esquiva Falcao vs Vincenzo Gualtieri	$410,000	AGON Sports	$375,000	TopRank	first source is in German
Did not materialize	Teofimo Lopez vs George Kambosos Jr.	$6,150,000	Triller Fight Club	$3,506,000	Matchroom Boxing	Thriller found in break of contract, Matchroom awarded rights
Did not materialize	Alexander Povetkin vs Bermane Stiverne	$3,165,000	Andrey Ryabinsky	$2,100,000	Don King	
Did not materialize	Demetrius Andrade vs Zach Parker	$350,000	Queensberry Promotions	$0	no other promoter bid	
Did not materialize	Lamont Peterson vs Zab Judah	$50,000	Headbangers Boxing	$0	no other promoter bid	
