= Ben Vaughan =

English boxer (born 1999)

Personal information
- Nickname: The Bomber
- Born: Benjamin James Vaughan; 19 May 1999 (age 27) Northampton, Northamptonshire, England
- Height: 5 ft 9 in (175 cm)
- Weight: Welterweight

Boxing career
- Stance: Southpaw

Boxing record
- Total fights: 15
- Wins: 12
- Win by KO: 4
- Losses: 3

Ben Vaughan (born 19 May 1999) is an English professional boxer. He is a former Midlands Area welterweight champion and has also challenged for British, Commonwealth, English and WBO European titles in the same weight division.

== Career ==
After an amateur career fighting out of Kings Heath Boxing Club and winning 54 of 68 bouts including claiming four national age-group titles, Vaughan turned professional in 2021. He made his pro-debut at The Deco in Northampton on 10 October 2021, defeating Ezequiel Gregores on points in a four-round contest.

Unbeaten in his first nine outings in the paid ranks, Vaughan faced fellow undefeated boxer Liam Gould for the vacant Midlands Area welterweight title at The Eastside Rooms in Birmingham on 12 April 2024. He won by stoppage in the first round.

He challenged WBO European welterweight champion Ekow Essuman at Bp pulse LIVE Arena in Birmingham on 2 November 2024, losing via majority decision. Two of the ringside judges favoured Essuman 97–93 and 97–94 respectively, while the third scored the fight a 95–95 draw.

Vaughan got back to winning ways in his next contest, defeating Octavian Gratii on points in a non-title bout over six rounds at the Mercure Hotel in Northampton on 21 February 2025.

He faced Bobby Dalton for the vacant English welterweight title at King's Hall in Stoke on 26 July 2025. Vaughan lost via majority decision with two of the ringside judges scoring the fight 97–93 and 96–95 respectively for his opponent, while the third had it a 95–95 draw.

Vaughan challenged British and Commonwealth welterweight champion Constantin Ursu at The O2 Arena in London on 29 August 2026. He lost by technical knockout when the referee stopped the contest on the advice of the ringside doctor at the start of the eighth round due to a severe cut over his right eye.

== Professional boxing record ==
| 15 fights | 12 wins | 3 losses |
|---|---|---|
| By knockout | 4 | 1 |
| By decision | 8 | 2 |

| No. | Result | Record | Opponent | Type | Round, time | Date | Location | Notes |
|---|---|---|---|---|---|---|---|---|
| 15 | Loss | 12–3 | Constantin Ursu | TKO | 8 (12), 0:03 | 29 Aug 2026 | The O2 Arena, London, England | For British and Commonwealth welterweight titles |
| 14 | Win | 12–2 | Alexeyv Mikhail Arellano Leon | KO | 1 (6), 3:09 | 12 Dec 2025 | Park Inn Hotel, Northampton, England | |
| 13 | Loss | 11–2 | Bobby Dalton | MD | 10 | 30 Mar 2025 | King's Hall, Stoke-on-Trent, England | For vacant English welterweight title |
| 12 | Win | 11–1 | Octavian Gratii | PTS | 6 | 21 Feb 2025 | Park Inn Hotel, Northampton, England | |
| 11 | Loss | 10–1 | Ekow Essuman | MD | 10 | 2 Nov 2024 | bp pulse LIVE, Birmingham, England | For WBO European welterweight title |
| 10 | Win | 10–0 | Dom Hunt | TKO | 1 (10), 1:38 | 29 Jun 2024 | Magna Centre, Rotherham, England | |
| 9 | Win | 9–0 | Liam Gould | TKO | 1 (10), 2:49 | 12 Apr 2024 | The Eastside Rooms, Birmingham, England | Won vacant Midlands Area welterweight title |
| 8 | Win | 8–0 | Dale Arrowsmith | PTS | 6 | 17 Feb 2024 | Park Inn Hotel, Northampton, England | |
| 7 | Win | 7–0 | Jimmy Cooper | TKO | 4 (10), 0:45 | 20 Oct 2023 | Holiday Inn, Birmingham, England | |
| 6 | Win | 6–0 | Matthew King | PTS | 6 | 8 Jul 2023 | Mountbatten Centre, Portsmouth, England | |
| 5 | Win | 5–0 | Georgi Velichkov | PTS | 6 | 24 Mar 2023 | Park Inn Hotel, Northampton, England | |
| 4 | Win | 4–0 | Liam Fox | PTS | 4 | 18 Nov 2022 | Park Inn Hotel, Northampton, England | |
| 3 | Win | 3–0 | Carl Turney | PTS | 4 | 30 Jul 2022 | Dunstable Conference Centre, Dunstable, England | |
| 2 | Win | 2–0 | Naeem Ali | PTS | 4 | 30 Apr 2022 | Civic Hall, Grays, England | |
| 1 | Win | 1–0 | Ezequiel Gregores | PTS | 4 | 10 Oct 2021 | The Deco, Northampton, England | |
