= Bobby Dalton (boxer) =

English boxer (born 1998)

Personal information
- Nationality: English
- Born: 16 December 1998 (age 27)
- Weight: Welterweight

Boxing career
- Stance: Orthodox

Boxing record
- Total fights: 14
- Wins: 12
- Win by KO: 2
- Losses: 2

Bobby Dalton (born 16 December 1998) is an English professional boxer. He held the English welterweight title in 2025.

== Career ==
After an amateur career which saw him win 33 of 50 bouts including becoming a two-time North East champion, Dalton turned professional in 2022. Unbeaten in his first nine pro-fights, he defeated Jeff Saunders for the vacant Northern Area welterweight title at Rainton Meadows Arena in Houghton-le-Spring on 30 November 2024.

In his 11th contest in the paid ranks, Dalton faced Ben Vaughan for the vacant English welterweight title at King's Hall in Stoke on 26 July 2025. He won via majority decision with two of the ringside judges scoring the fight 97–93 and 96–95 respectively in his favour, while the third had it a 95–95 draw.

Dalton made the first defense of his title against Joel Kodua at the Vaillant Arena in Derby on 29 November 2025. He lost by unanimous decision.

== Personal life ==
Away from the boxing ring, Dalton works in civil engineering.

== Professional boxing record ==
14 fights	12 wins	2 losses
By knockout	2	1
By decision	10	1

No.	Result	Record	Opponent	Type	Round, time	Date	Location	Notes
14	Loss	12–2	Ben Crocker	TKO	4 (10), 2:46	1 Aug 2026	Vertu Motors Arena, Newcastle, England	For vacant WBO Inter-continental welterweight title
13	Win	12–1	Ezequiel Gregores	PTS	6	20 Jun 2026	Eston Leisure Centre, Middlesbrough, England	
12	Loss	11–1	Joel Kodua	UD	10	29 Nov 2025	Vaillant Arena, Derby, England	Lost English welterweight title
11	Win	11–0	Ben Vaughan	MD	10	26 Jul 2025	King's Hall, Stoke, England	Won vacant English welterweight title
10	Win	10–0	Justin Menzie	TKO	4 (6), 1:31	29 Mar 2025	Rainton Meadows Arena, Houghton-le-Spring, England	
9	Win	9–0	Jeff Saunders	PTS	10	30 Nov 2024	Rainton Meadows Arena, Houghton-le-Spring, England	Won vacant Northern Area welterweight title
8	Win	8–0	Connor Meanwell	PTS	6	11 May 2024	Rainton Meadows Arena, Houghton-le-Spring, England	
7	Win	7–0	Sam Kirk	TKO	4 (6), 1:45	16 Mar 2024	Rainton Meadows Arena, Houghton-le-Spring, England	
6	Win	6–0	Serge Ambomo	PTS	6	21 Oct 2023	Rainton Meadows Arena, Houghton-le-Spring, England	
5	Win	5–0	Richard Helm	PTS	6	14 Jul 2023	Rainton Meadows Arena, Houghton-le-Spring, England	
4	Win	4–0	Dale Arrowsmith	PTS	4	1 Apr 2023	Rainton Meadows Arena, Houghton-le-Spring, England	
3	Win	3–0	Joel Banderas	PTS	4	2 Dec 2022	Rainton Meadows Arena, Houghton-le-Spring, England	
2	Win	2–0	Kristaps Zulgis	PTS	4	17 Jul 2022	Stadium of Light, Sunderland, England	
1	Win	1–0	George Rogers	PTS	4	8 Apr 2022	Rainton Meadows Arena, Houghton-le-Spring, England	
