= Loriga (surname) =

Loriga is a Latin origin surname. Notable people with the surname include:

- Joaquín Loriga (1895–1927), Spanish aviator
- Ray Loriga (born 1967), Spanish author, screenwriter, and director
- Tobia Giuseppe Loriga (born 1977), Italian boxer
