= Kevin McCauley =

English boxer (born 1979)

Personal information
- Born: 21 September 1979 (age 46) Brighton, Sussex, England
- Height: 5 ft 9 in (175 cm)
- Weight: Middleweight, Light-middleweight, Welterweight, Super-lightweight, Lightweight

Boxing career
- Stance: Orthodox

Boxing record
- Total fights: 251
- Wins: 15
- Win by KO: 0
- Losses: 224
- Draws: 12

Kevin McCauley (born 20 July 1993) is an English former professional boxer. During a 15-year career, he won the Midlands Area welterweight title before transitioning into a journeyman role and going on to have 251 fights. McCauley was inducted into the British Boxing Hall of Fame in 2025.

== Career ==
A former judo player, McCauley took up professional boxing in 2008.

He defeated defending champion, Dave Ryan, on points 97–96 to win the Midlands Area welterweight title at the Heritage Hotel in Derby on 2 February 2010.

In his first defense on 4 December 2010, McCauley lost his title to Sean McKervey on points 96–94 at the Hilton Hotel in Coventry.

He subsequently moved into a journeyman role, plying his trade at various weight categories from middleweight to lightweight and amassing a 251 fight record, including sharing a ring with future world champions Liam Smith and Sam Eggington as well as Jack Catterall, Troy Williamson, Bradley Skeete, Jason Welborn, Frankie Gavin, Ekow Essuman, Harry Scarff, Conah Walker and Jack Rafferty, who would all go on to be British title holders.

Despite suffering 224 defeats, McCauley only failed to go the full distance in 14 of his bouts. His final contest was a four-round points defeat to Mussab Abubaker in Willenhall on 27 March 2022.

In July 2022, McCauley announced his retirement from professional boxing. He was inducted into the British Boxing Hall of Fame in September 2025 as part of its 100 Plus Club.

== Personal life ==
McCauley has a degree in criminology and social care from the University of Wolverhampton.
