= Darren Tetley =

English boxer (born 1993)

Personal information
- Born: 20 July 1993 (age 32) Bradford, Yorkshire, England
- Height: 5 ft 11 in (180 cm)
- Weight: Welterweight, Light-welterweight

Boxing career
- Stance: Southpaw

Boxing record
- Total fights: 28
- Wins: 22
- Win by KO: 9
- Losses: 6
Medal record
Men's amateur boxing
Representing England
Commonwealth Youth Games
Gold medal – first place	2011 Douglas	Light-welterweight

Darren Tetley (born 20 July 1993) is an English former professional boxer. During an 11-year career, he was the WBO European welterweight champion and challenged for the British, Commonwealth and English titles in the same weight division. As an amateur, Tetley won a silver medal in the light-welterweight category at the 2011 Commonwealth Youth Games.

== Career ==
After an amateur career which included winning a silver medal at the 2011 Commonwealth Youth Games and three junior national titles, Tetley turned professional in August 2013 and defeated Kevin McCauley on points over four rounds on his pro-debut at Ponds Forge in Sheffield on 29 November that year.

Unbeaten in his first 15 fights in the paid ranks, he faced Mason Cartwright for the vacant WBO European welterweight title at Elland Road in Leeds on 19 May 2018, winning the contest by stoppage in the ninth round. Tetley knocked his opponent to the canvas in the eighth round and, although he got back to his feet, the bout was halted in the next round on the advice of the ringside doctor due to a serious cut on Cartwright's lip.

On 19 February 2021, Tetley took on Samuel Antwi at De Vere Whites in Bolton with the vacant English welterweight title on the line. He lost via stoppage in the sixth round.

Arguably the biggest night of his career came on 23 April 2022, when he challenged British and Commonwealth welterweight champion Ekow Essuman at Wembley Stadium in London on the undercard of the Tyson Fury vs. Dillian Whyte world heavyweight championship fight. Tetley lost by unanimous decision.

His final bout was at York Hall in London on 8 December 2023 against undefeated Elliot Whale. Tetley was forced to retire on his stool at the end of the fourth round after suffering an eye injury which subsequently required surgery to repair.

Tetley announced his retirement from professional boxing in August 2024.
