= Vassell =

Vassell is a surname. Notable people with the surname include:

- Darius Vassell (born 1980), English footballer
- Denton Vassell (born 1984), English boxer
- Devin Vassell (born 2000), American basketball player
- Isaac Vassell (born 1993), English footballer
- Kyle Vassell (born 1992), English footballer
- Kadene Vassell (born 1989), Dutch sprinter
- Linton Vassell (born 1983), English mixed martial artist
