= Mohamed Mimoune =

French boxer

Personal information
- Nickname: The Problem
- Nationality: French
- Born: 21 September 1987 (age 39) Toulouse, Haute-Garonne, France
- Height: 5 ft 10 in (178 cm)
- Weight: Light-welterweight; Welterweight
- Website: http://MohamedMimoune.fr/

Boxing career
- Reach: 71 in (180 cm)
- Stance: Southpaw

Boxing record
- Total fights: 31
- Wins: 24
- Win by KO: 5
- Losses: 7

Mohamed Mimoune (born 21 September 1987) is a French professional boxer who held the IBO super-lightweight title in 2018. At regional level, he held the European and European Union welterweight titles between 2016 and 2017.

== Professional career ==
On 11 April 2015, Mimoune faced undefeated Spanish boxer "Ferino V" Ceferino Rodríguez in Benidorm, Spain. Mimoune won the eight-round bout by unanimous decision.

On 16 January 2016, Mimoune defeated Kamal Mohamed to win the France welterweight title in Toulouse. He won the bout by unanimous decision, avenging a prior loss to Kamal when the two fought in 2013 in Clermont-Ferrand.

On 10 March, the EBU ordered Mimoune and Spanish boxer Kerman Lejarraga the opportunity to face off for its European Union welterweight title vacated by Paulie Malignaggi. However, on 9 April, Lejarraga's team withdrew from the title opportunity. He was replaced by undefeated Spanish prospect "El Sultan" Nabil Krissi for an event scheduled for 6 May in Noisy-le-Grand, France, featuring a triple-headliner of bouts between Spaniards and Frenchmen vying for European Union titles. Mimoune defeated Nabil Krissi by technical knockout in the fourth round to claim the EU title.

On 17 December 2016, Mimoune defeated Damien Martin by unanimous decision to retain the European Union title in Noisy-le-Grand.

On 31 March 2017, Mimoune defeated Jussi Koivula by unanimous decision to retain the European Union title.

On 7 October, Mimoune defeated British welterweight Sam Eggington to win the European championship in Manchester, England. He dominated the bout but won by split decision.

On 20 January 2018, Mimoune faced undefeated Argentine boxer Emiliano Dominguez Rodriguez for the vacant IBO world title last held by Julius Indongo. He defeated Rodriquez by unanimous decision to win the IBO light-welterweight title in Paris, France.

On 20 October, Mimoune defeated Franck Petitjean by unanimous decision to retain his IBO light-welterweight title in Dakar, Senegal.

== Personal life ==
Mimoune began boxing when he was nine years old. He also played football as a child. He began training at the Boxing Toulouse Bagatelle at the age of 12.

== Professional boxing record ==
31 fights	24 wins	7 losses
By knockout	5	1
By decision	19	6

No.	Result	Record	Opponent	Type	Round time	Date	Location	Notes
31	Loss	24–7	Movladdin Biyarslanov	TKO	2 (10), 2:16	6 Feb 2025	Montreal Casino, Montreal, Canada	For NABF super lightweight title
30	Win	24–6	Tyrone McKenna	TKO	5 (10), 0:45	3 Aug 2024	The SSE Arena, Belfast, Northern Ireland	
29	Loss	23–6	Batyrzhan Jukembayev	UD	10	13 Dec 2023	Whitesands Events Center, Plant City, Florida, U.S.	
28	Win	23–5	Steven Galeano	TKO	6 (10), 1:21	26 Jul 2023	Kissimmee Civic Center, Kissimmee, Florida, U.S.	
27	Loss	22–5	Cesar Francis	UD	10	25 Mar 2022	Whitesands Events Center, Plant City, Florida, U.S.	
26	Loss	22–4	Tyrone McKenna	UD	10	21 Feb 2020	York Hall, London, England	For WBC International light welterweight title; The Golden Contract: light-welterweight – Semi-final
25	Win	22–3	Darren Surtees	TKO	5 (10), 2:21	22 Nov 2019	York Hall, London, England	The Golden Contract: light-welterweight – Quarter-final
24	Loss	21–3	Viktor Postol	UD	10	27 Apr 2019	Cosmopolitan of Las Vegas, Las Vegas, U.S.	
23	Win	21–2	Franck Petitjean	UD	12	20 Oct 2018	Canal Olympia, Dakar, Senegal	Retained IBO light welterweight title
22	Win	20–2	Emiliano Dominguez Rodriguez	UD	12	20 Jan 2018	Palais des sports Marcel Cerdan, Levallois-Perret, France	Won vacant IBO light welterweight title
21	Win	19–2	Sam Eggington	SD	12	7 Oct 2017	Manchester Arena, Manchester, England	Won European welterweight title
20	Win	18–2	Jussi Koivula	UD	12	31 Mar 2017	Institut National du Judo, Paris XIV, France	Retained European Union welterweight title
19	Win	17–2	Damien Martin	UD	12	17 Dec 2016	Gymnase du Clos de l'Arche, Noisy-le-Grand, France	Retained European Union welterweight title
18	Win	16–2	Nabil Krissi	TKO	4 (12)	6 May 2016	Gymnase du Clos de l'Arche, Noisy-le-Grand, France	Won vacant European Union welterweight title
17	Win	15–2	Kamal Mohamed	UD	10	16 Jan 2016	Salle Pierre Montane, Toulouse, France	Won vacant France welterweight title
16	Win	14–2	Steven Bloyer	PTS	8	12 Sep 2015	Salle Pierre Montane, Toulouse, France	
15	Win	13–2	Ceferino Rodríguez	UD	8	11 Apr 2015	Palacio de los Deportes, Benidorm, Spain	
14	Win	12–2	Tamaz Avdiev	UD	10	6 Dec 2014	Salle polyvalente, Marmoutier, France	
13	Loss	11–2	Alexandre Lepelley	SD	8	30 Nov 2013	Salle Pierre Montesquiou, Condom, France	
12	Win	11–1	Lyes Chaibi	PTS	6	5 Jul 2013	Salle du Mouzon, Auch, France	
11	Loss	10–1	Kamal Mohamed	PTS	8	3 May 2013	Salle du Cosec, Clermont-Ferrand, France	
10	Win	10–0	Steven Bloyer	KO	6 (6)	16 Feb 2013	Salle du piloris, Campbon, France	
9	Win	9–0	Karim Menasria	PTS	6	8 Dec 2012	Salle Pierre Montesquiou, Condom, France	
8	Win	8–0	Mickael Sanches	PTS	8	15 Jun 2012	Halle aux Grains, Toulouse, France	
7	Win	7–0	Barthelemy Lefebvre	PTS	6	28 Apr 2012	Salle Marcel Dufour, Louvroil, France	
6	Win	6–0	Christophe Guedes	PTS	6	21 Apr 2012	Salle Pierre Montane, Toulouse, France	
5	Win	5–0	Thomas Nawrot	PTS	6	12 Nov 2011	Salle Pierre Montane, Toulouse, France	
4	Win	4–0	Benjamin Poitou	PTS	4	1 Jul 2011	Parc des expositions, Albi, France	
3	Win	3–0	Frederic Herbache	PTS	4	18 Jun 2010	Salle l'archipel, Castres, France	
2	Win	2–0	Benjamin Poitou	PTS	4	29 May 2010	Salle Pierre Montane, Toulouse, France	
1	Win	1–0	Haroulyoun Babayan	PTS	4	17 Apr 2010	Salle Monestre, Plaisance-du-Touch, France	
