= Bradley Skeete =

English boxer (born 1987)

Personal information
- Nickname: Super
- Born: 17 October 1987 (age 39) Tooting, London, England
- Height: 6 ft 1 in (185 cm)
- Weight: Welterweight
- Website: www.bradleyskeete.com

Boxing career
- Reach: 75 in (191 cm)
- Stance: Orthodox

Boxing record
- Total fights: 33
- Wins: 29
- Win by KO: 14
- Losses: 4

Bradley Skeete (born 17 October 1987) is a British professional boxer. He held the British welterweight title from 2016 to 2017 and the Commonwealth welterweight title in 2016.

== Professional career ==
Born in Tooting, and raised on the Surrey Lane Estate in Battersea, Skeete made his professional boxing debut in October 2010 with a points win against Billy Smith.

In December 2012, he stopped Chas Symonds in four rounds to take the BBBofC Southern Area welterweight title, successfully defending it in March 2013 against Peter McDonagh.

In November 2013, he beat Colin Lynes by unanimous decision to take the English welterweight title. In his next fight he beat Christopher Sebire to take the vacant WBA Inter-Continental welterweight title. He successfully defended the inter-continental title in April 2014, stopping Tobia Giuseppe Loriga in the seventh round.

In November 2014, he faced Frankie Gavin at the ExCel Arena for the latter's British title and the vacant Commonwealth title. The fight went the distance with Gavin getting a controversial unanimous decision, inflicting the first defeat of Skeete's career.

On 28 February 2015, Skeete beat Anzor Gamgebeli to take the vacant WBO European welterweight title, and successfully defended it four months later, stopping Mark Thompson in the third round. He followed this with a second defence against Stevie Williams in November 2015.

In March 2016 he convincingly beat defending champion Sam Eggington to add the British and Commonwealth titles.

On 28 April 2018, Skeete faced Spanish boxer Kerman Lejarraga for the vacant European welterweight title. He lost the bout by technical knockout in the second round.

Skeete challenged Hamzah Sheeraz for the WBO European light-middleweight title at the Copper Box Arena in London on 4 December 2021 losing the fight by stoppage in the ninth-round of a controversial contest which saw the champion docked a point in round eight for punching Skeete while he was on the canvas after being knocked down.

Skeete officially announced his retirement from boxing in March 2022.

== Professional boxing record ==
33 fights	29 wins	4 losses
By knockout	14	3
By decision	15	1

No.	Result	Record	Opponent	Type	Round, time	Date	Location	Notes
33	Loss	29–4	Hamzah Sheeraz	TKO	9 (10)	4 Dec 2021	Copper Box Arena, London, England	For WBO European junior-middleweight title
32	Win	29–3	Dale Arrowsmith	TKO	3 (6)	4 Jun 2021	Sheffield Arena, Sheffield, England	
31	Loss	28–3	Diego Ramirez	TKO	2 (10)	15 Dec 2018	Brentwood Centre, Essex, England	For vacant WBO International welterweight title
30	Win	28–2	Fernando Valencia	TKO	3 (8)	20 Oct 2018	Brentwood Centre, Brentwood, Essex, England	
29	Loss	27–2	Kerman Lejarraga	TKO	2 (12), 1:45	28 Apr 2018	Bilbao Arena, Bilbao, Spain	For vacant European welterweight title
28	Win	27–1	Dale Evans	UD	12	8 Jul 2017	Copper Box Arena, London, England	Retained British welterweight title
27	Win	26–1	Shayne Singleton	TKO	5 (12), 0:13	2 Jun 2017	Brentwood Centre, Essex, England	Retained British welterweight title
26	Win	25–1	John Thain	UD	12	25 Nov 2016	Brentwood Centre, Essex, London	Retained British welterweight title
25	Win	24–1	Alexandre Lepelley	TKO	7 (10), 1:44	16 July 2016	Ice Arena Wales, Cardiff, Wales	Retained WBO European welterweight title
24	Win	23–1	Sam Eggington	UD	12	5 March 2016	Genting Arena, Birmingham, England	Won British and Commonwealth welterweight titles
23	Win	22–1	Stevie Williams	UD	10	23 Nov 2015	Hilton Hotel, London, England	Retained WBO European welterweight title
22	Win	21–1	Mark Thompson	TKO	3 (10), 1:57	26 Sep 2015	Wembley Arena, London, England	Retained WBO European welterweight title
21	Win	20–1	Brunet Zamora	RTD	6 (10),	9 May 2015	Wembley Arena, London, England	Retained WBO European welterweight title
20	Win	19–1	Anzor Gamgebeli	KO	1 (10), 1:50	28 Feb 2015	The O2 Arena, London, England	Won vacant WBO European welterweight title
19	Loss	18–1	Frankie Gavin	UD	12	29 Nov 2014	Excel Arena, London, England	For British and Commonwealth welterweight titles
18	Win	18–0	Leandro Mendes Pinto	TKO	2 (10), 0:40	20 Sep 2014	York Hall, London, England	
17	Win	17–0	Steven Pearce	TKO	3 (8), 1:43	16 July 2014	York Hall, London, England	
16	Win	16–0	Tobia Giuseppe Loriga	TKO	7 (12), 1:34	12 Apr 2014	Copper Box Arena, London, England	Retained WBA Inter-Continental welterweight title
15	Win	15–0	Christopher Sebire	UD	12	15 Feb 2014	Copper Box Arena, London, England	Won vacant WBA Inter-Continental welterweight title
14	Win	14–0	Colin Lynes	UD	10	30 Nov 2013	Copper Box Arena, London, England	Won vacant English welterweight title
13	Win	13–0	Kieron Gray	PTS	6	21 Sep 2013	Copper Box Arena, London, England	
12	Win	12–0	Dee Mitchell	PTS	6	20 Jul 2013	Wembley Arena, London, England	
11	Win	11–0	Peter McDonagh	PTS	10	21 Mar 2013	York Hall, London, England	Retained British Southern Area welterweight title
10	Win	10–0	Chas Symonds	TKO	4 (10), 2:44	15 Dec 2012	Excel Arena, London, England	Won British Southern Area welterweight title
9	Win	9–0	Peter McDonagh	PTS	10	14 Sep 2012	York Hall, London, England	
8	Win	8–0	Ross Payne	TKO	1 (8), 1:57	28 Apr 2012	Royal Albert Hall, London, England	
7	Win	7–0	Laszlo Komjathi	PTS	8	10 Feb 2012	York Hall, London, England	
6	Win	6–0	Michael Frontin	PTS	8	13 Jan 2012	York Hall, London, England	
5	Win	5–0	Jay Morris	TKO	5 (6), 0:19	5 Nov 2011	Wembley Arena, London, England	
4	Win	4–0	Steve Spence	PTS	4	21 Oct 2011	York Hall, London, England	
3	Win	3–0	Kevin McCauley	PTS	4	2 Apr 2011	York Hall, London, England	
2	Win	2–0	Johnny Greaves	TKO	4 (4), 0:43	19 Feb 2011	York Hall, London, England	
1	Win	1–0	Billy Smith	PTS	4	23 Oct 2010	York Hall, London, England	
