= Reece MacMillan =

English boxer (born 1996)

Personal information
- Nickname: Raging Bull
- Born: 4 January 1996 (age 30) Lancaster, Lancashire, England
- Height: 5 ft 8 in (173 cm)
- Weight: Super-lightweight, Welterweight

Boxing career
- Stance: Orthodox

Boxing record
- Total fights: 19
- Wins: 17
- Win by KO: 2
- Losses: 2

Reece MacMillan (born 4 January 1996) is an English former professional boxer. He challenged for the British and Commonwealth super-lightweight titles in 2025 and was Central Area champion in the same weight division in 2024.

== Career ==
Having taken up boxing aged 10, MacMillan made his professional debut at De Vere Whites Hotel in Bolton on 23 April 2016, stopping Giuseppe Daprato in the fourth of their scheduled six-round welterweight bout.

With a record of 16 wins and one defeat, he returned to De Vere Whites Hotel to face Kane Gardner for the vacant Central Area super-lightweight title on 30 November 2024, winning the contest on points 96–95.

In his next outing, MacMillan challenged British, Commonwealth and WBC International Silver super-lightweight champion Jack Rafferty at Co-op Live Arena in Manchester on 8 February 2025. He lost by stoppage when his corner threw in the towel during the seventh round.

== Professional boxing record ==
19 fights	17 wins	2 losses
By knockout	2	2
By decision	15	0

No.	Result	Record	Opponent	Type	Round, time	Date	Location	Notes
19	Loss	17–2	Jack Rafferty	TKO	7 (12), 1:37	8 Feb 2025	Co-op Live Arena, Manchester, England	For British, Commonwealth and WBC International Silver super-lightweight titles
18	Win	17–1	Kane Gardner	PTS	10	30 Nov 2024	De Vere Whites Hotel, Bolton, England	Won vacant Central Area super-lightweight title
17	Win	16–1	Fonz Alexander	PTS	4	11 May 2024	Winter Gardens, Blackpool, England	
16	Win	15–1	Mark Butler	PTS	6	30 Apr 2022	De Vere Whites Hotel, Bolton, England	
15	Win	14–1	Des Newton	PTS	6	12 Mar 2022	Municipal Hall, Colne, England	
14	Win	13–1	Lee Connelly	PTS	6	3 Sep 2021	Municipal Hall, Colne, England	
13	Win	12–1	Chris Conwell	TKO	5 (10)	14 Mar 2020	De Vere Whites Hotel, Bolton, England	
12	Win	11–1	Naeem Ali	PTS	4	14 Dec 2019	Lion of Vienna Suite, Bolton Wanderers F.C., Bolton, England	
11	Win	10–1	Dean Jones	PTS	4	16 Jun 2019	Woodhouse Park Lifestyle Centre, Wythenshawe, England	
10	Win	9–1	Lee Connelly	PTS	8	2 Mar 2019	De Vere Whites Hotel, Bolton, England	
9	Win	8–1	Ricky Rose	PTS	4	1 Dec 2018	DW Stadium, Wigan, England	
8	Win	7–1	Ibrar Riyaz	PTS	6	29 Sep 2018	De Vere Whites Hotel, Bolton, England	
7	Win	6–1	Innocent Anyanwu	PTS	4	12 May 2018	De Vere Whites Hotel, Bolton, England	
6	Win	5–1	Kristian Laight	PTS	4	18 Nov 2017	Bowlers Exhibition Centre, Manchester, England	
5	Loss	4–1	Adam Little	TKO	4 (6), 1:29	16 Sep 2017	Echo Arena, Liverpool, England	
4	Win	4–0	Fonz Alexander	PTS	4	10 Feb 2017	Bowlers Exhibition Centre, Manchester, England	
3	Win	3–0	Youssef Al Hamidi	PTS	4	18 Nov 2016	Bowlers Exhibition Centre, Manchester, England	
2	Win	2–0	Alec Bazza	PTS	4	18 Jun 2016	Guild Hall, Preston, England	
1	Win	1–0	Giuseppe Daprato	RTD	4 (6), 2:00	23 Apr 2016	De Vere Whites Hotel, Bolton, England	
