= Frankie Gavin (boxer) =

English boxer (born 1985)

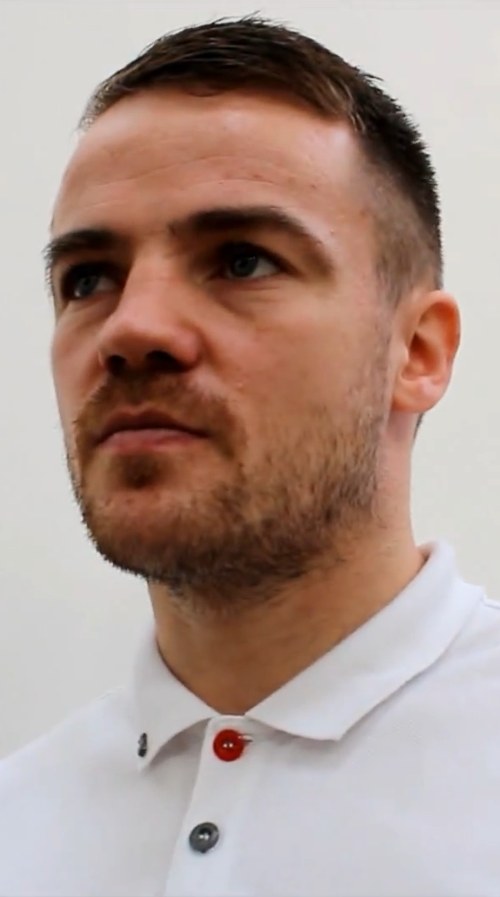
- Gavin in 2015

Personal information
- Nicknames: Funtime; King
- Born: Frankie Raymond Gavin; 28 September 1985 (age 40) Birmingham, West Midlands, England
- Height: 5 ft 10 in (178 cm)
- Weight: Light-welterweight; Welterweight; Light-middleweight

Boxing career
- Stance: Southpaw

Boxing record
- Total fights: 30
- Wins: 26
- Win by KO: 15
- Losses: 4
Medal record
Men's amateur boxing
Representing England
World Championships
Gold medal – first place	2007 Chicago	Lightweight
Commonwealth Games
Gold medal – first place	2006 Melbourne	Lightweight
EU Championships
Gold medal – first place	2008 Cetniewo	Light-welterweight
Bronze medal – third place	2005 Cagliari	Lightweight

Frankie Raymond Gavin (born 28 September 1985) is an English former professional boxer. He challenged for the IBF welterweight title in 2015 and, at regional level, held the British and Commonwealth welterweight titles. As an amateur, Gavin won a gold medal in the lightweight division at the 2007 World Championships, becoming England's first ever winner of that event. He also won lightweight gold at the 2006 Commonwealth Games.

== Amateur career ==
Domestically as an amateur, Gavin represented the Birmingham's Hall Green Boxing Club with whom he won the English ABA championship in 2005 and 2007 and a Four Nations championship in 2005.

=== 2006 Commonwealth Games ===
Representing England, Gavin defeated Giovanni Frontin of Mauritius to win the lightweight division gold at the 2006 Commonwealth Games in Melbourne, Australia.

=== 2007 World Championships ===
At the 2007 World Championships in Chicago, Gavin first beat reigning world silver medallist and fellow southpaw Romal Amanov of Azerbaijan scoring a knockdown. He then caused a huge upset by defeating Russian superstar Aleksei Tishchenko, unbeaten in four years, to reach the final where he beat Italian Domenico Valentino 19:10.

=== 2008 Summer Olympics ===
Gavin was arguably Great Britain's best hope of a boxing medal at the 2008 Summer Olympics, but was unable to make the required weight and was therefore unable to compete.

== Professional career ==
In October 2008, Gavin announced that he would turn professional. He signed a contract with promoter Frank Warren and agreed to be trained by Anthony Farnell in Manchester. He made his pro-debut at the National Indoor Arena in his home city of Birmingham on 28 February 2009, stopping George Kadaria in the fourth round.

On 18 September 2010 at LG Arena in Birmingham, he won his first professional title by defeating Michael Kelly in the fifth round for the Irish light-welterweight title. He qualified to fight for the title as his parents are Irish.

Gavin won the British welterweight title on 1 November 2012, by dethroning defending champion Junior Witter via unanimous decision at York Hall in London.

He made a successful first defense of the title with a seventh round stoppage win over Jason Welborn at the Town Hall in Walsall on 18 January 2013.

Gavin faced unbeaten Commonwealth welterweight champion, Denton Vassell, at Liverpool Olympia on 28 June 2013, with both their titles up for grabs. He unleashed a heavy onslaught of blows in the seventh round leaving his opponent with a broken jaw which caused the fight to be stopped on the advice of the ringside doctor at the end of the round.

On 21 September 2013 at the Copper Box Arena in London, he defended both his titles against David Barnes, winning by unanimous decision.

At Metro Radio Arena in Newcastle on 29 Match 2014, Gavin survived being knocked to the canvas in the second round by Sacky Shikukutu to go on and retain his Commonwealth title via unanimous decision.

In his next fight, he lost his unbeaten record and Commonwealth title to European welterweight champion, Leonard Bundu, suffering a split decision defeat at the Civic Hall in Wolverhampton on 1 August 2014. One of the ringside judges scored the fight 117–115 in his favour, but was overruled by his two colleagues who both saw it 114–113 for his opponent.

Gavin retained the now vacant Commonwealth crown, and defended his British title, with a unanimous decision win over Bradley Skeete at ExCeL in London on 29 November 2014.

He challenged IBF welterweight champion Kell Brook at The O2 Arena in London on 30 May 2015, losing by stoppage in the sixth round.

Gavin lost to local rival Sam Eggington by eighth round technical knockout at Arena Birmingham on 22 October 2016.

He was scheduled to challenge European welterweight champion Kerman Lejarraga at BEC Bizkaia Arena in Bilbao, Spain, on 17 November 2018, but failed to make the required weight by almost 5lbs. The fight went ahead with the title no longer up for grabs and Gavin was knocked out in the fourth round.

Gavin announced his retirement from professional boxing in May 2020.

== Bare-knuckle boxing ==
Gavin made his Bare Knuckle Fighting Championship debut against Jack Dugdale on 28 June 2025 at BKFC 77. He was knocked out inside the first minute of the opening round.

== Personal life ==
As of June 2025, Gavin was in a relationship with professional boxer Sian O’Toole with whom he has a son.

== Professional boxing record ==
30 fights	26 wins	4 losses
By knockout	15	3
By decision	11	1

No.	Result	Record	Opponent	Type	Round, time	Date	Location	Notes
30	Loss	26–4	Kerman Lejarraga	KO	4 (12), 0:19	17 Nov 2018	BEC Bizkaia Arena, Bilbao, Spain	For European welterweight title
29	Win	26–3	Kevin McCauley	PTS	6	16 Sep 2018	Holiday Inn, Birmingham, West Midlands	
28	Win	25–3	Felix Matamoros	TKO	6 (6), 1:32	3 Jun 2017	Lagoon Leisure Centre, Paisley, Scotland	
27	Win	24–3	Renald Garrido	PTS	8	13 May 2017	Barclaycard Arena, Birmingham, England	
26	Loss	23–3	Sam Eggington	TKO	8 (12), 2:42	22 Oct 2016	Barclaycard Arena, Birmingham, England	
25	Win	23–2	Ivo Gogosevic	TKO	6 (6), 2:46	30 Jul 2016	First Direct Arena, Leeds, England	
24	Loss	22–2	Kell Brook	TKO	6 (12), 2:51	30 May 2015	The O2 Arena, London, England	For IBF welterweight title
23	Win	22–1	Bogdan Mitic	PTS	10	28 Mar 2015	Motorpoint Arena, Sheffield, England	
22	Win	21–1	Bradley Skeete	UD	12	29 Nov 2014	ExCeL, London, England	Retained British welterweight title; Won vacant Commonwealth welterweight title
21	Win	20–1	Mate Hornyak	TKO	2 (8), 2:47	24 Oct 2014	Civic Hall, Wolverhampton, England	
20	Loss	19–1	Leonard Bundu	SD	12	1 Aug 2014	Civic Hall, Wolverhampton, England	Lost Commonwealth welterweight title; For European welterweight title
19	Win	19–0	Sacky Shikukutu	UD	12	29 Mar 2014	Metro Radio Arena, Newcastle, England	Retained Commonwealth welterweight title
18	Win	18–0	Bradley Pryce	PTS	10	21 Dec 2013	First Direct Arena, Leeds, England	
17	Win	17–0	David Barnes	UD	12	21 Sep 2013	Copper Box Arena, London, England	Retained British and Commonwealth welterweight titles
16	Win	16–0	Denton Vassell	TKO	7 (12), 3:00	28 Jun 2013	Liverpool Olympia, Liverpool, England	Retained British welterweight title; Won Commonwealth welterweight title
15	Win	15–0	Jason Welborn	TKO	7 (12), 2:35	18 Jan 2013	Town Hall, Walsall, England	Retained British welterweight title
14	Win	14–0	Junior Witter	UD	12	1 Nov 2012	York Hall, London, England	Won British welterweight title
13	Win	13–0	Laszlo Komjathi	RTD	5 (8), 3:00	25 May 2012	Newport Centre, Newport, Wales	
12	Win	12–0	Kevin McIntyre	TKO	3 (8), 2:22	25 Feb 2012	Motorpoint Arena, Cardiff, Wales	
11	Win	11–0	Curtis Woodhouse	SD	12	16 Jul 2011	Echo Arena, Liverpool, England	Retained WBO Inter-Continental welterweight title
10	Win	10–0	Young Mutley	UD	12	21 May 2011	The O2 Arena, London, England	Won vacant WBO Inter-Continental welterweight title
9	Win	9–0	Michael Lomax	TKO	7 (12), 2:42	19 Feb 2011	York Hall, London, England	
8	Win	8–0	Michael Kelly	TKO	5 (10), 2:59	18 Sep 2010	LG Arena, Birmingham, England	Won vacant Irish light-welterweight title
7	Win	7–0	Gavin Tait	TKO	1 (8), 2:07	15 May 2010	Boleyn Ground, London, England	
6	Win	6–0	Peter McDonagh	PTS	6	13 Feb 2010	Wembley Arena, London, England	
5	Win	5–0	Samir Tergaoui	TKO	6 (6), 2:51	5 Dec 2009	Metro Radio Arena, Newcastle, England	
4	Win	4–0	Steve Saville	TKO	2 (6), 2:32	30 Oct 2009	Echo Arena, Liverpool, England	
3	Win	3–0	Graham Fearn	TKO	2 (4), 2:25	18 Jul 2009	MEN Arena, Manchester, England	
2	Win	2–0	Mourad Frarema	TKO	3 (4), 2:59	15 May 2009	Odyssey Arena, Belfast, Northern Ireland	
1	Win	1–0	George Kadaria	TKO	4 (4), 1:39	28 Feb 2009	National Indoor Arena, Birmingham, England	

Sporting positions
Regional boxing titles
Vacant Title last held by Andy Murray	Irish light-welterweight champion 18 September 2010 – February 2011; Vacated	Vacant
Vacant Title last held by Kell Brook	WBO Inter-Continental welterweight champion 21 May 2011 – March 2012; Vacated	Vacant Title next held by Jan Zaveck
Preceded by Junior Witter	British welterweight champion 1 November 2012 – May 2015; Vacated	Vacant Title next held by Sam Eggington
Preceded by Denton Vassell	Commonwealth welterweight champion 28 June 2013 – 1 August 2014	Succeeded by Leonard Bundu
Vacant Title last held by Leonard Bundu	Commonwealth welterweight champion 29 November 2014 – May 2015; Vacated	Vacant Title next held by Sam Eggington
