= Joel Kodua =

Ghanaian-born English boxer (born 1997)

Personal information
- Nickname: JFK
- Nationality: English
- Born: 5 January 1997 (age 29) Ghana
- Weight: Welterweight, Super-welterweight

Boxing career
- Stance: Orthodox

Boxing record
- Total fights: 12
- Wins: 12
- Win by KO: 4

Joel Kodua (born 5 January 1997) is a Ghanaian-born English professional boxer. He has held the English welterweight title since November 2025.

== Career ==
Born in Ghana and based in Dagenham, Kodua took up boxing in 2018. He made his professional debut at York Hall in London on 16 September 2022, defeating Joe Hardy on points over four rounds.

Coached by Tunde Ajayi, mentored by three-time world title challenger Anthony Yarde and with a perfect record of eight wins from eight fights, Kudoa claimed his first professional titles by stopping Southern Area welterweight champion, Daniel Francis, in the last round of their bout at York Hall on 28 June 2025, which was also for the vacant Commonwealth Silver welterweight championship.

In his next outing, he challenged English welterweight champion Bobby Dalton at the Vaillant Arena in Derby on 29 November 2025. Kodua won the contest, which was shown live on the BBC iPlayer, via unanimous decision.

== Personal life ==
Kodua worked as a railway engineer before focusing full-time on boxing. His younger brother, Gideon, is a professional footballer.

== Professional boxing record ==
12 fights	12 wins	0 losses
By knockout	4	0
By decision	8	0

No.	Result	Record	Opponent	Type	Round, time	Date	Location	Notes
12	Win	12–0	Will Harrison	RTD	8 (10), 3:00	30 May 2026	Wembley Arena, London, England	Retained English welterweight title
11	Win	11–0	Joe Garside	RTD	7 (10), 3:00	31 Jan 2026	Copper Box Arena, London, England	
10	Win	10–0	Bobby Dalton	UD	10	29 Nov 2025	Vaillant Arena, Derby, England	Won English welterweight title
9	Win	9–0	Daniel Francis	TKO	10 (10), 0:53	28 Jun 2025	York Hall, London, England	Won Southern Area welterweight title and vacant Commonwealth Silver welterweight title
8	Win	8–0	Lloyd Germain	TKO	3 (8), 0:51	1 Feb 2025	Wembley Arena, London, England	
7	Win	7–0	John Henry Mosquera	PTS	6	3 Aug 2024	Oakwell, Barnsley, England	
6	Win	6–0	George Sutcliffe	PTS	4	7 Apr 2024	York Hall, London, England	
5	Win	5–0	Dario Borosa	PTS	4	1 Dec 2023	York Hall, London, England	
4	Win	4–0	Eligio Palacios	PTS	6	18 Aug 2023	York Hall, London, England	
3	Win	3–0	Berman Sanchez	PTS	6	15 Jul 2023	York Hall, London, England	
2	Win	2–0	Dale Arrowsmith	PTS	4	15 Apr 2023	Copper Box Arena, London, England	
1	Win	1–0	Joe Hardy	PTS	4	16 Sep 2022	York Hall, London, England	
