= Ekow Essuman =

British boxer (born 1989)

Personal information
- Nickname: The Engine
- Nationality: British
- Born: Haizel Ekow Tabiri-Essuman; 30 March 1989 (age 37) Botswana
- Height: 5 ft 10 in (178 cm)
- Weight: Welterweight; Light-middleweight

Boxing career
- Stance: Orthodox

Boxing record
- Total fights: 25
- Wins: 22
- Win by KO: 8
- Losses: 3

Ekow 'The Engine' Essuman (born 30 March 1989) is a Botswana-British professional boxer. At regional level, he has held multiple welterweight championships, including the British and Commonwealth titles from 2021 to 2023. He holds a notable win over former undisputed light-welterweight champion Josh Taylor.

== Professional career ==
Essuman made his professional debut on 1 December 2016, scoring a four-round points decision (PTS) victory against Andrej Cepur at the Holiday Inn, Birmingham, England.

After compiling a record of 8–0 (2 KOs), he faced Andy Keates for the vacant English welterweight title on 20 October 2018 at the Harvey Hadden Sports Village in Nottingham, England. Essuman knocked Keates down twice in the fourth round en route to a fifth-round technical knockout (TKO). He returned to the Harvey Hadden Sports Village for his next fight, successfully defending his English title against former British super-lightweight champion, Tyrone Nurse, via majority decision (MD) on 16 March 2019. Two judges scored the bout in favour of Essuman with 98–93 and 96–94 while the third scored it a draw at 95–95. After a stoppage win over William Warburton in July and a PTS victory over Zygimantas Butkevicius in October, Essuman finished 2019 with a second defence of his title on 30 November, defeating Curtis Felix Jr via eighth-round TKO at the York Hall in London.

Essuman defended his British, Commonwealth and IBF European welterweight belts, against Darren Tetley on 23 April 2022, on the undercard of Tyson Fury vs. Dillian Whyte.

He lost his titles and unbeaten record to Harry Scarff at Manchester Arena on 18 November 2023 via unanimous decision.

Essuman stopped Owen Cooper in the final round to win the WBO European welterweight title at Manchester Arena on 20 July 2024.

He made a successful first defense of his title with a majority decision victory over Ben Vaughan at Resorts World Arena in Birmingham on 2 November 2024.

Essuman defeated Josh Taylor by unanimous decision to win the vacant WBO Global title at the SSE Hydro in Glasgow on 24 May 2025.

He lost the title in his first defense against Jack Catterall by 11th round technical knockout at Tottenham Hotspur Stadium in London on 15 November 2025.

== Professional boxing record ==
25 fights	22 wins	3 losses
By knockout	8	2
By decision	14	1

No.	Result	Record	Opponent	Type	Round, time	Date	Location	Notes
25	Loss	22–3	Jack Rafferty	RTD	6 (12), 3:00	9 May 2026	Co-op Live, Manchester, England	For vacant WBA Gold welterweight title
24	Loss	22–2	Jack Catterall	TKO	11 (12), 0:50	15 Nov 2025	Tottenham Hotspur Stadium, London, England	Lost WBO Global welterweight title
23	Win	22–1	Josh Taylor	UD	12	24 May 2025	OVO Hydro, Glasgow, Scotland	Won vacant WBO Global welterweight title
22	Win	21–1	Ben Vaughan	MD	10	2 Nov, 2024	bp pulse LIVE, Birmingham, England	Retained WBO European welterweight title
21	Win	20–1	Owen Cooper	TKO	10 (10) 0:23	20 Jul, 2024	bp pulse LIVE, Birmingham, England	Won WBO European welterweight title
20	Loss	19–1	Harry Scarff	UD	12	18 Nov 2023	Manchester Arena, Manchester, England	Lost British, Commonwealth, and IBF European welterweight titles
19	Win	19–0	Chris Kongo	MD	12	21 Jan 2023	Manchester Arena, Manchester, England	Retained British, Commonwealth and IBF European welterweight titles; Won WBC International Silver welterweight title
18	Win	18–0	Samuel Antwi	UD	12	24 Sep 2022	Manchester Arena, Manchester, England	Retained British, Commonwealth, and IBF European welterweight titles
17	Win	17–0	Darren Tetley	UD	12	23 Apr 2022	Wembley Stadium, London, England	Retained British, Commonwealth, and IBF European welterweight titles
16	Win	16–0	Danny Ball	KO	6 (12), 3:00	9 Oct 2021	Arena Birmingham, Birmingham, England	Retained British, Commonwealth, and IBF European welterweight titles
15	Win	15–0	Chris Jenkins	TKO	8 (12), 0:43	24 Jul 2021	The SSE Arena, London, England	Won British and Commonwealth welterweight titles
14	Win	14–0	Cedrick Peynaud	UD	10	12 Sep 2020	York Hall, London, England	Won vacant IBF European welterweight title
13	Win	13–0	Curtis Felix Jr	TKO	8 (10), 2:14	30 Nov 2019	York Hall, London, England	Retained English welterweight title
12	Win	12–0	Zygimantas Butkevicius	PTS	6	19 Oct 2019	Britannia Hotel, Nottingham, England	
11	Win	11–0	William Warburton	RTD	6 (8), 3:00	6 Jul 2019	Harvey Hadden Sports Village, Nottingham, England	
10	Win	10–0	Tyrone Nurse	MD	10	16 Mar 2019	Harvey Hadden Sports Village, Nottingham, England	Retained English welterweight title
9	Win	9–0	Andy Keates	TKO	5 (10), 0:43	20 Oct 2018	Harvey Hadden Sports Village, Nottingham, England	Won vacant English welterweight title
8	Win	8–0	Edvinas Puplauskas	PTS	6	15 Sep 2018	Britannia Hotel, Nottingham, England	
7	Win	7–0	Nelson Altamirano	TKO	1 (8), 0:42	31 Mar 2018	Harvey Hadden Sports Village, Nottingham, England	
6	Win	6–0	Jordan Grannum	PTS	6	16 Dec 2017	Bingham Leisure Centre, Bingham, England	
5	Win	5–0	Serge Ambomo	PTS	8	21 Oct 2017	Harvey Hadden Sports Village, Nottingham, England	
4	Win	4–0	Arvydas Trizno	PTS	4	24 Jun 2017	Bingham Leisure Centre, Bingham, England	
3	Win	3–0	Casey Blair	TKO	3 (4), 0:26	22 Apr 2017	Leicester Arena, Leicester, England	
2	Win	2–0	Kevin McCauley	PTS	4	4 Feb 2017	Bingham Leisure Centre, Bingham, England	
1	Win	1–0	Andrej Cepur	PTS	4	1 Dec 2016	Holiday Inn, Birmingham, England	

Regional boxing titles
Vacant Title last held by John O'Donnell	English welterweight champion March 18, 2017 – July 24, 2021; Won British title	Vacant Title last held by Samuel Antwi
Vacant Title last held by Cedric Peynaud	IBF European welterweight champion September 12, 2020 – November 18, 2023	Succeeded by Harry Scarff
Preceded by Chris Jenkins	British welterweight champion July 24, 2021 – November 18, 2023	Succeeded by Harry Scarff
Preceded by Chris Jenkins	Commonwealth welterweight champion July 24, 2021 – November 18, 2023	Succeeded by Harry Scarff
Preceded by Chris Kongo	WBC International Silver welterweight champion January 21 – November 2023; Vacated	Vacant Title next held by Michael McKinson
Vacant Title last held by David Papot	WBO Global welterweight champion May 24 – November 15, 2025	Succeeded by Jack Catterall
