= David Avanesyan =

Russian boxer (born 1988)

David Avanesyan Давид Аванесян
Personal information
- Nickname: Ava
- Nationality: Russian
- Born: David Gavrushevich Avanesyan; 15 August 1988 (age 38) Pyatigorsk, Stavropol Krai, Soviet Union (now Russia)
- Height: 1.73 m (5 ft 8 in)
- Weight: Welterweight

Boxing career
- Reach: 174 cm (69 in)
- Stance: Orthodox

Boxing record
- Total fights: 37
- Wins: 31
- Win by KO: 19
- Losses: 5
- Draws: 1

David Gavrushevich Avanesyan (Russian: Давид Гаврушевич Аванесян; born 15 August 1988) is a Russian professional boxer. He has held the European welterweight title since 2019 and previously the WBA (Regular) welterweight title in 2017 (previously the interim title from 2015 until being promoted).

== Early life ==
Avanesyan was born into an Armenian family in the Caucasus region of Pyatigorsk.

== Professional career ==
=== Early career ===
Avanesyan made his professional debut on 12 June 2009, scoring a four-round unanimous decision (UD) against Vazgen Agadzhanyan, who also debuted. In his second fight a month later, on 11 July, Avanesyan lost a six-round UD to Andrey Klimov. He would then win twelve consecutive fights over the next four years, picking up the Russian welterweight title and two WBC regional titles along the way. Avanesyan's winning streak ended on 16 March 2013, following a split draw against Aslanbek Kozaev.

=== WBA interim welterweight champion ===
2015 and 2016 were banner years for Avanesyan. On 7 November 2015 he stopped Charlie Navarro in nine rounds to win the vacant WBA interim welterweight title.

==== Avanesyan vs. Mosley ====
The biggest win of Avanesyan's career took place on 28 May 2016, when he scored a clear UD against decorated former world champion Shane Mosley to retain his title, while also making his United States debut.

=== WBA (Regular) welterweight champion ===
On 15 July 2016, the WBA announced that Keith Thurman would have to make a mandatory defence against interim champion Avanesyan. Both camps had until 13 August to negotiate the fight or purse bids would be ordered by the WBA. Due to negotiations breaking down, the WBA elevated Avanesyan to Regular champion status and Thurman was named Super champion.

==== Avanesyan vs. Peterson ====
In December 2016, early reports suggested there was a fight in the works for Avanesyan to defend the WBA (Regular) title against former light welterweight world champion Lamont Peterson. A venue in the US was being discussed for February 2017. On 11 January 2017, a spokesperson for Avanesyan announced the fight would take place on 18 February at the Cintas Center in Cincinnati, Ohio, as part of the undercard to Adrien Broner vs. Adrían Granados, aired by Showtime. Avanesyan failed to make a successful first defence of his title, losing a close UD to Peterson in fight which was described as "highly competitive and entertaining" by ESPN. Two judges scored it 116–112 and the third had it closer at 115–113, all in favor of Peterson. Avanesyan earned a purse of $75,000, while Peterson earned $250,000.

==== Avanesyan vs. Kelly ====
On February 20, 2021, Avanesyan fought Josh Kelly, who was ranked #15 by the IBF at welterweight. Avanesyan won the fight via sixth-round TKO.

==== Avanesyan vs. Taylor ====
In his next bout, Avanesyan fought and defeated Liam Taylor via second-round TKO.

==== Avanesyan vs. Ennis ====
Avanesyan unsuccessfully challenged Jaron Ennis for the IBF welterweight title at Wells Fargo Center in Philadelphia, on July 13, 2024, losing when he retired on his stool at the end of round five.

== Professional boxing record ==
37 fights	31 wins	5 losses
By knockout	19	3
By decision	12	2
Draws	1	

No.	Result	Record	Opponent	Type	Round, time	Date	Location	Notes
37	Win	31–5–1	Sadudee Srimueang	TKO	1 (6), 1:35	29 Dec 2024	Kathu Boxing Club, Kathu, Thailand	
36	Loss	30–5–1	Jaron Ennis	RTD	5 (12), 3:00	13 Jul 2024	Wells Fargo Center, Philadelphia, Pennsylvania, U.S.	For IBF welterweight title
35	Win	30–4–1	Serge Ambomo	RTD	4 (6), 3:00	20 Dec 2023	The Eastside Rooms, Birmingham, England	
34	Loss	29–4–1	Terence Crawford	KO	6 (12), 2:14	10 Dec 2022	CHI Health Center Omaha, Nebraska, U.S.	For WBO welterweight title
33	Win	29–3–1	Oskari Metz	TKO	1 (12), 2:00	19 Mar 2022	The SSE Arena Wembley, London, England	Retained European welterweight title
32	Win	28–3–1	Liam Taylor	TKO	2 (12), 2:18	2 Oct 2021	The SSE Arena Wembley, London, England	Retained European welterweight title
31	Win	27–3–1	Josh Kelly	TKO	6 (12), 2:15	20 Feb 2021	The SSE Arena, Wembley, London, England	Retained European welterweight title
30	Win	26–3–1	Jose Del Rio	TKO	1 (12), 2:06	12 Dec 2019	Pavelló de la Vall d'Hebron, Barcelona, Spain	Retained European welterweight title
29	Win	25–3–1	Kerman Lejarraga	TKO	1 (12), 2:26	28 Sep 2019	Bilbao Arena, Bilbao, Spain	Retained European welterweight title
28	Win	24–3–1	Kerman Lejarraga	TKO	9 (12), 2:27	30 Mar 2019	Bilbao Arena, Bilbao, Spain	Won European welterweight title
27	Loss	23–3–1	Egidijus Kavaliauskas	TKO	6 (10), 1:55	16 Feb 2018	Grand Sierra Resort Grand Theatre, Reno, Nevada, U.S.	For WBC-NABF welterweight title
26	Win	23–2–1	Serge Ambomo	PTS	8	9 Dec 2017	Imperial Banqueting Suite, Bilston, England	
25	Loss	22–2–1	Lamont Peterson	UD	12	18 Feb 2017	Cintas Center, Cincinnati, Ohio, US	Lost WBA (Regular) welterweight title
24	Win	22–1–1	Shane Mosley	UD	12	28 May 2016	Gila River Arena, Glendale, Arizona, US	Retained WBA interim welterweight title
23	Win	21–1–1	Charlie Navarro	TKO	9 (12), 1:50	7 Nov 2015	Salle des Etoiles, Monte Carlo, Monaco	Won vacant WBA interim welterweight title
22	Win	20–1–1	Dean Byrne	TKO	6 (8), 0:41	27 Jun 2015	Hilton Hotel, Blackpool, England	
21	Win	19–1–1	Laszlo Fazekas	PTS	10	7 Dec 2014	Titanic Hotel, Liverpool, England	
20	Win	18–1–1	Ramon de la Cruz Sena	UD	10	26 Sep 2014	Basket-Hall, Krasnodar, Russia	Retained WBC Baltic welterweight title
19	Win	17–1–1	Kaizer Mabuza	UD	12	18 Apr 2014	Basket-Hall, Krasnodar, Russia	Retained WBC Baltic welterweight title
18	Win	16–1–1	Carlos Herrera	KO	2 (10), 1:46	4 Nov 2013	Basket-Hall, Krasnodar, Russia	Won vacant WBC Baltic welterweight title
17	Win	15–1–1	Fariz Kazimov	RTD	5 (8), 3:00	30 Aug 2013	Laskovyy Bereg, Sukko, Russia	
16	Win	14–1–1	Bogdan Protsyshyn	TKO	3 (8), 2:59	15 May 2013	Casino Conti Giant Hall, Saint Petersburg, Russia	
15	Draw	13–1–1	Aslanbek Kozaev	SD	12	16 Mar 2013	Sports Palace "Znamya", Noginsk, Russia	For WBC Baltic and WBC–CISBB welterweight titles
14	Win	13–1	Mykola Korenev	TKO	6 (8), 1:51	16 Feb 2013	Trade and Entertainment Centre "Moskva", Kaspiysk, Russia	
13	Win	12–1	Roman Seliverstov	UD	10	13 Oct 2012	Galich Hall, Krasnodar, Russia	
12	Win	11–1	James Onyango	KO	3 (12), 0:40	16 Mar 2012	State Circus, Krasnodar, Russia	Won vacant WBC–ABCO welterweight title
11	Win	10–1	Bogdan Bondarenko	KO	3 (6), 0:23	19 Nov 2011	Express, Rostov-on-Don, Russia	
10	Win	9–1	Samuel Kamau	TKO	3 (10), 2:30	30 Jul 2011	Sport Centre, Kushchyovskaya, Russia	Won vacant WBC Youth Intercontinental interim welterweight title
9	Win	8–1	Ruslan Khayrtdinov	UD	10	28 May 2011	Red Square, Moscow, Russia	Retained Russia welterweight title
8	Win	7–1	Movsar Kotiev	TKO	2 (6), 1:28	26 Mar 2011	Sport Centre, Kushchyovskaya, Russia	
7	Win	6–1	Lochinbek Husanov	TKO	2 (6)	27 Nov 2010	Express, Rostov-on-Don, Russia	
6	Win	5–1	Ivan Kaberkon	UD	10	24 Aug 2010	Concert Hall "Russia", Pyatigorsk, Russia	Won vacant Russia welterweight title
5	Win	4–1	Armen Israelyan	UD	4	27 May 2010	Central Sport Complex, Tyumen, Russia	
4	Win	3–1	Rustam Shidginov	UD	8	17 Mar 2010	Versiya Night Club, Pyatigorsk, Russia	
3	Win	2–1	Dmytro Luganskyy	UD	6	21 Aug 2009	Olymp, Gelendzhik, Russia	
2	Loss	1–1	Andrey Klimov	UD	6	11 Jul 2009	Yunost Sports Complex, Podolsk, Russia	
1	Win	1–0	Vazgen Agadzhanyan	UD	4	12 Jun 2009	State Circus, Sochi, Russia	

Sporting positions
Regional boxing titles
Vacant Title last held by Alexey Evchenko	Russia welterweight champion 24 August 2010 – July 2011; Vacated	Vacant Title next held by Vaginak Tamrazyan
New title	WBC Youth Intercontinental welterweight champion Interim title 30 July 2011 – November 2011; Vacated	Vacant
Vacant Title last held by Anton Novikov	WBC–ABCO welterweight champion 16 March 2012 – October 2012; Vacated	Vacant Title next held by Roman Zhailauov
Vacant Title last held by Anton Novikov	WBC Baltic welterweight champion 4 November 2013 – December 2014; Vacated	Vacant Title next held by Anthony Yigit
Preceded by Kerman Lejarraga	European welterweight champion 30 March 2019 – present	Incumbent
World boxing titles
Vacant Title last held by Andre Berto	WBA welterweight champion Interim title 7 November 2015 – 7 February 2017; Promoted	Vacant Title next held by Jamal James
Vacant Title last held by Keith Thurman promoted to Champion	WBA welterweight champion Regular title 7 February 2017 – 18 February 2017	Succeeded by Lamont Peterson
