= Samuel Antwi =

English boxer (born 1991)

Personal information
- Nickname: True Sensation
- Born: Samuel Kofi Tetteh Antwi; 6 December 1991 (age 34) London, England
- Height: 5 ft 8 in (173 cm)
- Weight: Welterweight, Super-welterweight

Boxing career
- Stance: Orthodox

Boxing record
- Total fights: 19
- Wins: 17
- Win by KO: 8
- Losses: 2

Samuel Antwi (born 6 December 1991) is a British professional boxer who is a former British super-welterweight champion. He has also held the English welterweight title.

== Career ==
Having compiled a record of 12 wins and one loss, Antwi won the vacant English welterweight title against Darren Tetley at De Vere Whites in Bolton on 19 February 2021. He knocked his opponent to the canvas in the first round and again in the sixth and, although Tetley got back to his feet, the referee to stopped the contest just before the end of the round.

He successfully defended his title with a unanimous decision win over Conah Walker at Cardiff International Arena on 5 February 2022.

In his next fight, Antwi challenged British and Commonwealth welterweight champion Ekow Essuman at Manchester Arena on 24 September 2022, losing via unanimous decision.

Just under a year later, he moved up a weight division to take on Mason Cartwright for the vacant British super-welterweight title back at De Vere Whites on 1 September 2023. Antwi claimed the belt by stopping his opponent in the final round. He vacated the title in 2024 without making any defenses.
