= Jack Rafferty =

English boxer (born 1995)

Personal information
- Nickname: Demolition Man
- Born: 22 September 1995 (age 31) Manchester, Lancashire, England
- Height: 5 ft 9 in (175 cm)
- Weight: Super-lightweight; Welterweight

Boxing career
- Stance: Orthodox

Boxing record
- Total fights: 29
- Wins: 28
- Win by KO: 18
- Draws: 1

Jack Rafferty (born 22 September 1995) is an English professional boxer. He has held the Commonwealth and British super-lightweight titles.

== Boxing career ==
=== Early career ===
Rafferty made his professional debut on 7 October 2017 against Kevin McCauley, winning the bout by points decision.

Rafferty faced Ben Fields on 16 September 2023. He won the bout by technical knockout in the ninth round to win the Commonwealth Silver title.

=== Commonwealth and British super lightweight champion ===
Rafferty faced Lee Appleyard for the vacant Commonwealth super-lightweight title on 16 December 2023. He won the bout by TKO at 1 minute and 54 seconds in the first round, thus winning the title.

In his first Commonwealth title defense, Rafferty faced Henry Turner on 5 October 2024, on the undercard of Nick Ball vs. Ronny Rios, where the WBC International Silver super lightweight and British super lightweight titles were on the line. He won the bout by TKO in the ninth round during the bout to successfully defend his Commonwealth belt while also winning the WBC and British titles.

Rafferty defended his titles against Reece MacMillan at Co-op Live Arena in Manchester on 8 February 2025. He won by stoppage when his opponent's corner threw in the towel during the seventh round.

Rafferty made the next defense of his titles against Mark Chamberlain at Planet Ice in Altrincham on 23 August 2025. The fight ended in a majority draw with one of the ringside judges scoring it 115–114 in favour of Chamberlain, while the other two had it a 114–114 tie.

=== Move to welterweight ===
In his first fight at welterweight, Rafferty faced Ekow Essuman at the Co-op Live Arena on 9 May 2026. Rafferty controlled the fight throughout, with Essuman's corner eventually retiring him after the sixth round, handing Rafferty the vacant WBA Gold welterweight title.

Rafferty retained his title by beating Hovhannes Matirosyan on a unanimous decision at Manchester Arena, Manchester, on 7 November 2026.

== Professional boxing record ==
29 fights	28 wins	0 losses
By knockout	18	0
By decision	10	0
Draws	1	

No.	Result	Record	Opponent	Type	Round, time	Date	Location	Notes
29	Win	28–0–1	Hovhannes Matirosyan	UD	12	7 Nov 2026	Manchester Arena, Manchester, England	Retained WBA Gold welterweight title
28	Win	27–0–1	Ekow Essuman	RTD	6 (12), 3:00	9 May 2026	Co-op Live, Manchester, England	Won vacant WBA Gold welterweight title
27	Draw	26–0–1	Mark Chamberlain	MD	12	23 Aug 2025	Planet Ice, Altrincham, England	Retained British and Commonwealth super lightweight titles
26	Win	26–0	Cory O'Regan	TKO	5 (12), 2:26	5 Apr 2025	Co-op Live, Manchester, England	Retained Commonwealth super lightweight title
25	Win	25–0	Reece MacMillan	TKO	7 (12), 1:37	8 Feb 2025	Co-op Live, Manchester, England	Retained British, Commonwealth and WBC International Silver super lightweight titles
24	Win	24–0	Henry Turner	RTD	9 (12), 3:00	5 Oct 2024	Liverpool Arena, Liverpool, England	Retained Commonwealth super lightweight title; Won WBC International Silver and vacant British super lightweight titles
23	Win	23–0	Sabari Jaishankar	TKO	3 (10), 3:06	29 Jun 2024	Liverpool Olympia, Liverpool, England	
22	Win	22–0	Lee Appleyard	TKO	1 (12), 1:54	16 Dec 2023	Bowlers Exhibition Centre, Manchester, England	Won vacant Commonwealth super lightweight title
21	Win	21–0	Ben Fields	TKO	9 (10), 1:22	16 Sep 2023	Liverpool Olympia, Liverpool, England	
20	Win	20–0	Greyvin Mendoza	PTS	6	6 May 2023	Bolton Whites Hotel (De Vere Whites), Bolton, England	
19	Win	19–0	Olaide Fijabi	TKO	3 (8), 0:56	1 Jul 2022	Bolton Whites Hotel (De Vere Whites), Bolton, England	
18	Win	18–0	Evgenii Vazem	TKO	3 (8), 1:08	18 Feb 2022	Bolton Whites Hotel (De Vere Whites), Bolton, England	
17	Win	17–0	Alexey Tukhtarov	PTS	6	11 Dec 2021	Victoria Warehouse, Trafford Road, Manchester, England	
16	Win	16–0	Angel Emilov	PTS	6	23 Oct 2021	Grand Central Hall, Liverpool, England	
15	Win	15–0	Luka Lešković	TKO	3 (6), 0:47	9 Oct 2021	Rainton Meadows Arena, Houghton-le-Spring, England	
14	Win	14–0	Daniel Lartey	TKO	5 (6), 2:47	11 Sep 2021	Oldham Leisure Centre, Oldham, England	
13	Win	13–0	Tom Hill	PTS	8	11 Nov 2020	Production Park Studios, South Kirkby, England	
12	Win	12–0	Ismael Molina Moreno	PTS	6	22 Feb 2020	Oldham Leisure Centre, Oldham, England	
11	Win	11–0	Fernando Valencia	TKO	6 (6)	23 Nov 2019	Oldham Leisure Centre, Oldham, England	
10	Win	10–0	Nathan Hardy	TKO	1 (6)	26 Oct 2019	Oldham Leisure Centre, Oldham, England	
9	Win	9–0	Dylan Draper	TKO	4 (6), 1:51	31 Aug 2019	Oldham Leisure Centre, Oldham, England	
8	Win	8–0	Petar Aleksandrov	TKO	2 (6), 2:03	4 May 2019	Victoria Warehouse, Trafford Road, Manchester, England	
7	Win	7–0	Richard Samuels	PTS	6	9 Mar 2019	Bolton Whites Hotel (De Vere Whites), Bolton, England	
6	Win	6–0	Radoslav Mitev	KO	3 (6)	18 Dec 2018	Bolton Whites Hotel (De Vere Whites), Bolton, England	
5	Win	5–0	Innocent Anyanwu	PTS	6	6 Oct 2018	Oldham Leisure Centre, Oldham, England	
4	Win	4–0	Paul Cummings	TKO	3 (4)	16 Jun 2018	Bolton Whites Hotel (De Vere Whites), Bolton, England	
3	Win	3–0	Danny Little	TKO	2 (4), 2:15	29 Mar 2018	Doncaster Racecourse, Doncaster, England	
2	Win	2–0	James Gorman	PTS	4	17 Dec 2017	North Bridge Leisure Centre, Halifax, England	
1	Win	1–0	Kevin McCauley	PTS	4	7 Oct 2017	Bowlers Exhibition Centre, Manchester, England	
