= Moses Itauma vs Filip Hrgovic =

Boxing contest

Witness History
- Date: August 29, 2026
- Venue: O2 Arena, London, U.K
- Title on the line: IBF Heavyweight Champion

Tale of the tape
Boxer	Moses Itauma	Filip Hrgović
Hometown	Chatham, Kent, England	Zagreb, Croatia
Pre-fight record	14–0 (12 KOs)	20–1 (14 KOs)
Age	21 years, 8 months	34 years, 3 months
Height	6 ft 4 in (193 cm)	6 ft 6 in (198 cm)
Weight	Heavyweight	Heavyweight
Style	Southpaw	Orthodox
Recognition	The Ring; No. 6 Ranked Heavyweight; IBF; No. 3 Ranked Heavyweight	The Ring; No. 5 Ranked Heavyweight; IBF; No. 4 Ranked Heavyweight

Result
- Hrgovic wins by 9th Round TKO

Moses Itauma vs Filip Hrgović, billed as Witness History and Natural Born Thriller, was a heavyweight professional boxing match between undefeated British heavyweight Moses Itauma and Croatian heavyweight Filip Hrgović, for the vacant IBF heavyweight title. The bout took place on 29 August 2026 at the O2 Arena, London.

Hrgović won the bout via 9th round stoppage, giving Itauma his first professional loss.

== Background ==
On 22 April 2026, Sky Sports confirmed that Itauma would make his ring return at The O2 Arena, in London, on 25 July. Itauma’s team was deliberately postponing opponent selection until after the May heavyweight title fights to maximise his chances for a meaningful title opportunity. He was focused on the WBO and WBC title paths. On 4 May, Frank Warren stated that the event was postponed to 8 August 2026, while retaining the same venue. This rescheduling was primarily due to the announcement of Anthony Joshua's return fight on the original date, which was set to take place in Riyadh, Saudi Arabia, against Kristian Prenga.

A favourite to land the fight with Itauma was Croatian heavyweight Filip Hrgović (20–1, 15 KOs), who was scheduled to fight David Allen on 16 May. After Hrgovic stopped Allen, George Warren, of Queensberry Promotions, confirmed the fight was a done deal. On 25 May, Warren stated that Itauma would instead return to Manchester, rather than The O2 Arena. On 18 June, it was announced that Itauma would fight Hrgović on 29 August at The O2 Arena. During the launch press conference, Hrgović criticised the rapid rise of Itauma, arguing that Itauma’s career had been “given” to him through strong promotional backing and favourable opportunities. Hrgović contrasted Itauma’s path with his own, stating that he had taken a much harder route to elite level. Itauma responded that "He's almost 14 years older than me and we're still in the same position. He doesn't know anything about me to comment on that. At the end of the day the position I'm in wasn't given to me. I still had to beat and overcome challenges." Later in June Oleksandr Usyk relinquished the WBA, WBC and IBF titles. In July 2026, the IBF ordered Itauma and Frank Sánchez to begin negotiations for its vacant heavyweight title, giving both sides until 29 July to reach an agreement. Sánchez earned the IBF’s #1 ranking after stopping Richard Torrez in a title eliminator, while Itauma was ranked #3, with the #2 position vacant. The fight being ordered came at a strange time as Itauma already had a fight scheduled with Hrgović. On 4 August, the fight was elevated to be contested for the IBF title. Sanchez was paid step-aside money, while retaining his status as mandatory, as Frank Warren assured that he would "get the opportunity to fight for the title against the winner." Heading into the fight, Itauma was a 1/6 favourite, while Hrgović was a 7/1 underdog.

== Fight details ==
Itauma forced Hrgović to touch the canvas to find his balance in the second round. Itauma's lost by technical knockout (TKO) in the ninth round (2:27) by referee stoppage. Itauma's corner threw in the towel as the referee was stopping the fight. Hrgović later said that he thought he had lost every round and didn't know Itauma was so good. Hrgović said he had been outboxed, but Itauma was "gassed out" by the ninth round and his overexertion had been amateurish. Itauma ultimately left the ring on a stretcher, requiring oxygen. Both Itauma and promoter Warren said he would learn from the fight.

== Criticism ==
Ariel Helwani criticised DAZN's decision to place the fight on pay-per-view. Speaking on Uncrowned, Helwani argued that boxing was prioritising short-term revenue over long-term athlete development, stating that upcoming boxers should be made more accessible to casual audiences rather than being placed behind multiple paywalls. Helwani compared Itauma's career stage to that of Anthony Joshua prior to his first pay-per-view headline appearance, again arguing that Joshua had benefited from years of exposure on television before being expected to generate pay-per-view sales. He stated that despite Itauma being regarded as one of boxing's leading heavyweight prospects, he had not yet reached the same level of public recognition.

== Fight card ==
Weight class		vs		Method	Round	Time	Notes
Main card
Heavyweight	Filip Hrgović	def.	Moses Itauma	TKO	9		^{Note 1}
Lightweight	Sam Noakes	def.	Denys Berinchyk	UD	10
Heavyweight	Nelson Hysa	def.	Thomas Narmo	TKO	2		^{Note 2}
Welterweight	Constantin Ursu	def.	Ben Vaughan	TKO	8		^{Note 3}
Heavyweight	Guido Vianello	drew	Moses Jolly	PTS	8
Preliminary card
Super featherweight	Arbnor Jashari	def.	Numan Hussain	PTS	6
Cruiserweight	Aloys Youmbi	def.	Sherif Musah	PTS	6
Super bantamweight	Zayn Ahmed	def.	Liam Fitzmaurice	TKO	2
Super bantamweight	Hassan Ishaq	def.	Enzo Bahiano Munoz	PTS	4
Featherweight	Frankie Wood	def.	Callum Lee	TKO	6
Super flyweight	Tony Curtis	def.	Imad Naseeb	PTS	6
Middleweight	Sam King	def.	Jack Swallow	PTS	6

^Note 1 for the vacant IBF heavyweight title. Hrgović was knocked down in the 2nd round; Itauma was knocked down prior to the stoppage.

^Note 2 for the WBO Global heavyweight title. Narmo was knocked down by a right hand to the head prior to the stoppage.

^Note 3 for the BBBofC and Commonwealth Boxing Council welterweight titles. Vaughan was cut over the right eye in the 5th round; the bout was halted on doctor's advice.
