= Ceferino Rodríguez =

Spanish boxer (born 1988)

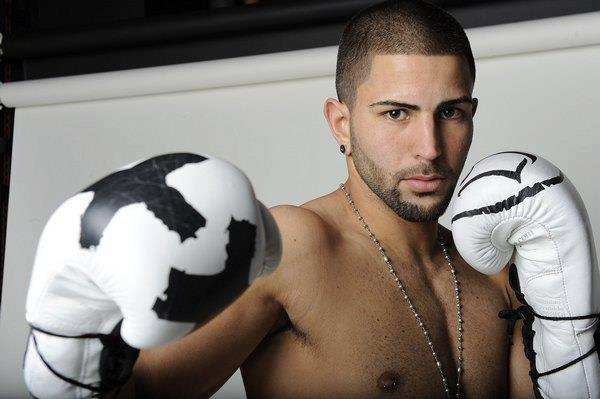

Personal information
- Nickname: Ferino V
- Nationality: Spanish
- Born: 16 September 1988 (age 37) Las Palmas, Spain
- Height: 1.76 m (5 ft 9 in)
- Weight: Welterweight

Boxing career
- Stance: Orthodox

Boxing record
- Total fights: 27
- Wins: 25
- Win by KO: 12
- Losses: 2

Ceferino Conrad Rodríguez Noda (born 16 September 1988) is a Spanish professional boxer. He held the European welterweight title from 2016 to 2017 and the European Union welterweight title from 2013 to 2014.

== Early life ==
Hailing from Las Palmas in the Canary Islands, Ceferino Rodríguez Noda was born into a family of boxers. His grandfather, Ceferino Rodríguez Duque, was the patriarch and competed as a lightweight in the early days of the sport. His father, also named Ceferino, was a four-time champion of the Canary Islands during his career. Then came two of his uncles, Isidro and Carmelo, who were known as Ferino III and IV.

Rodríguez Noda, a.k.a. Ferino V, was overweight as a young child and, for his thirteenth birthday, asked to join a boxing gym in order to lose weight. Within three months he had his first fight, although it didn't go well as his opponent was more experienced. After dropping some weight and improving in the ring, he went to his first Canarian Championships, winning a bronze medal. Shortly thereafter he asked his first opponent for a rematch and was able to beat him. In his amateur career, he amassed a record of 80–6–2. In addition, he was a nine-time champion of the Canary Islands as well as a two-time Spanish national champion.

== Professional career ==
Rodríguez made his professional debut on 26 November 2010, defeating Christian Kamara by fourth-round technical knockout (TKO) in Las Palmas. On 20 April 2012, in his seventh bout, he beat compatriot and fellow Canarian David Pulido for the vacant Spanish welterweight title. After a 12–0 start he faced Italian veteran Stefano Castellucci in Italy on 18 October 2013 for the vacant European Union welterweight title, winning the fight by seventh-round TKO in his first fight outside of his native Spain. He successfully defended his belt two months later with a unanimous decision (UD) victory over Daniel Rasilla, and retained a second time by knocking out Ismael El Massoudi at the Gran Canaria Arena in Las Palmas five months after that. Rodríguez vacated the title soon thereafter after declining an opportunity to defend it for a third time.

He suffered his first defeat on 11 April 2015, losing to Mohamed Mimoune in Benidorm by way of unanimous decision; his record fell to 18–1. In his next bout on 11 July he picked up the interim WBC Latino welterweight title with a 12-round unanimous decision victory over Aitor Nieto. Later that month it was announced that Rodríguez had signed a deal with Sampson Lewkowicz of Sampson Boxing, who promised to secure him more fights on international soil. After stopping an undefeated Davide Doria in five rounds in Las Palmas, he made his U.S. debut on 27 February 2016, defeating Edgar Riovalle by unanimous decision at the Honda Center in Anaheim, California. On 13 May he defended his WBC Latino title against Carlos Saul Chumbita in Argentina, scoring two knockdowns in the first round before securing a TKO in the second to retain his belt.

On 2 December 2016 he defeated Frenchman Ahmed El Mousaoui by split decision in Las Palmas for the vacant European welterweight title. Five months later, on 13 May 2017, he defended his title against Sam Eggington in Birmingham, with Eggington's WBC International welterweight title also on the line. The Englishman knocked Rodríguez out with a powerful left hook in the tenth round, sending him crashing through the ropes to take his European belt. After the loss he returned home to the Canary Islands to help with the family business in Jinámar, citing a lack of funds to continue boxing for the time being. After more than nine months, he made his return to the ring on 2 March 2018, defeating Elvin Pérez by points in Las Palmas.

== Professional boxing record ==
27 fights	25 wins	2 losses
By knockout	12	1
By decision	13	1

No.	Result	Record	Opponent	Type	Round, time	Date	Location	Notes
27	Win	25–2	(Nicaragua) Elvin Pérez	PTS	8	2 Mar 2018	Gallera del López Socas, Las Palmas, Spain	
26	Loss	24–2	(United Kingdom) Sam Eggington	KO	10 (12), 1:03	13 May 2017	(United Kingdom) Barclaycard Arena, Birmingham, England	Lost European welterweight title; For WBC International welterweight title
25	Win	24–1	(France) Ahmed El Mousaoui	SD	12	2 Dec 2016	Gran Canaria Arena, Las Palmas, Spain	Won vacant European welterweight title
24	Win	23–1	(Georgia (country)) Koba Karkashadze	SD	8	23 Jul 2016	Palacio de los Deportes, Benidorm, Spain	
23	Win	22–1	(Argentina) Carlos Saul Chumbita	TKO	2 (10)	13 May 2016	Club de Gimnasia y Esgrima La Plata, La Plata, Argentina	Retained WBC Latino welterweight title
22	Win	21–1	(Mexico) Edgar Riovalle	UD	6	27 Feb 2016	(United States) Honda Center, Anaheim, California, U.S.	
21	Win	20–1	(Germany) Davide Doria	TKO	5 (10)	14 Nov 2015	Gran Canaria Arena, Las Palmas, Spain	
20	Win	19–1	(Spain) Aitor Nieto	UD	12	11 Jul 2015	Centro Insular de Deportes, Las Palmas, Spain	Won interim WBC Latino welterweight title
19	Loss	18–1	(France) Mohamed Mimoune	UD	8	11 Apr 2015	Palacio de los Deportes, Benidorm, Spain	
18	Win	18–0	(France) Renald Garrido	UD	8	6 Mar 2015	Pabellón Jorge Garbajosa, Torrejón de Ardoz, Spain	
17	Win	17–0	(Georgia (country)) Giorgi Ungiadze	UD	8	29 Nov 2014	El Ferial, Torrelavega, Spain	
16	Win	16–0	(France) Ismael El Massoudi	KO	6 (12)	9 May 2014	Gran Canaria Arena, Las Palmas, Spain	Retained European Union welterweight title
15	Win	15–0	(Ukraine) Ivan Grynyuk	UD	8	21 Mar 2014	Gallera del López Socas, Las Palmas, Spain	
14	Win	14–0	(Spain) Daniel Rasilla	UD	12	14 Dec 2013	Pabellón Pedro Velarde, Maliaño, Spain	Retained European Union welterweight title
13	Win	13–0	(Italy) Stefano Castellucci	TKO	7 (12)	18 Oct 2013	Palasport, Avezzano, Italy	Won vacant European Union welterweight title
12	Win	12–0	(Spain) Iban Gallardo	UD	6	24 May 2013	Gallera del López Socas, Las Palmas, Spain	
11	Win	11–0	(Nicaragua) Miguel Aguilar	TKO	6	2 Feb 2013	Palacio de Deportes, Madrid, Spain	
10	Win	10–0	(France) Lyes Chaibi	PTS	6	23 Nov 2012	Pabellón Municipal de Tamaraceite, Las Palmas, Spain	
9	Win	9–0	(Romania) Adrian Parlogea	TKO	3 (6)	22 Sep 2012	Gimnasio Metropolitano, Madrid, Spain	
8	Win	8–0	(Colombia) Euclides Espitia	UD	6	26 May 2012	Polideportivo Sage 2000, Madrid, Spain	
7	Win	7–0	(Spain) David Pulido	TKO	10 (10)	20 Apr 2012	Club Las Palmeras Golf, Las Palmas, Spain	Won vacant Spanish welterweight title
6	Win	6–0	(Spain) Michael Oyono	TKO	3 (4)	11 Feb 2012	Plaza de Toros, Illescas, Spain	
5	Win	5–0	(Spain) Antonio Redondo	KO	2 (6)	11 Nov 2011	Pabellón Municipal de Tamaraceite, Las Palmas, Spain	
4	Win	4–0	(Nicaragua) Matías García	PTS	4	30 Jul 2011	Arrieta, Spain	
3	Win	3–0	(Spain) Ruben Cupe	RTD	3 (4)	3 Jun 2011	Club Las Palmeras Golf, Las Palmas, Spain	
2	Win	2–0	(Ecuador) Gabriel Valencia	TKO	1 (4)	19 Mar 2011	Pabellón Municipal de Tamaraceite, Las Palmas, Spain	
1	Win	1–0	(Sierra Leone) Christian Kamara	TKO	4 (4)	26 Nov 2010	Pabellón Municipal de Tamaraceite, Las Palmas, Spain	
