= Sam Eggington =

British boxer (born 1993)

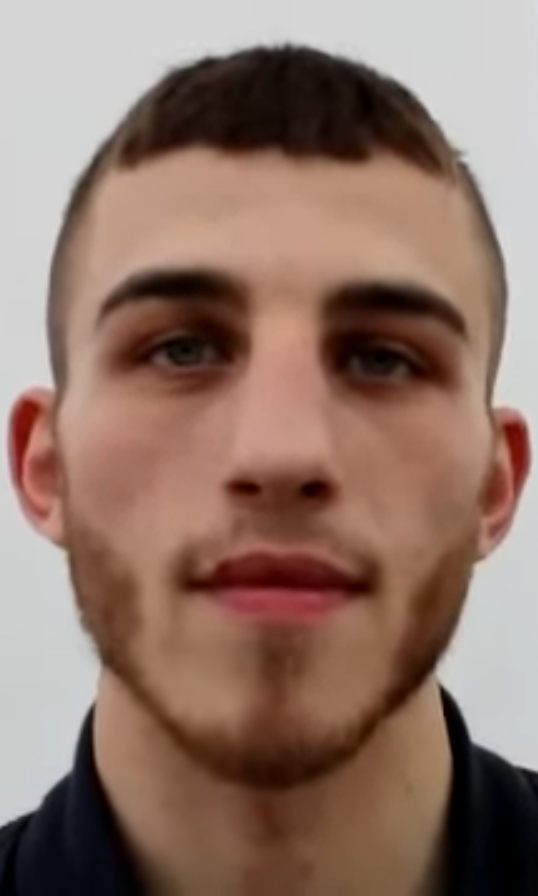
- Eggington in 2015

Personal information
- Nickname: The Savage
- Nationality: British
- Born: 15 October 1993 (age 32) Birmingham, West Midlands, England
- Height: 5 ft 11 in (180 cm)
- Weight: Welterweight; Light-middleweight; Middleweight

Boxing career
- Stance: Orthodox

Boxing record
- Total fights: 46
- Wins: 36
- Win by KO: 20
- Losses: 10

Sam Eggington (born 15 October 1993) is a British former professional boxer. He has held the IBO super-welterweight title as well as the British, Commonwealth and European welterweight titles.

== Professional career ==
Eggington won the vacant Commonwealth welterweight title with seventh-round technical knockout success over Joseph Lamptey from Ghana on 9 May 2015 in Birmingham.

He added the British welterweight title when he beat Glenn Foot by unanimous technical decision at Manchester Arena on 18 July 2015, when the ringside doctor called a halt to the contest at the end of the eighth-round due to a cut near Foot's right eye caused by an accidental head clash.

Eggington lost both his titles to Bradley Skeete on 5 March 2016, going down by unanimous decision at Resorts World Arena in Birmingham.

A 10th round knockout of Spain's defending champion, Ceferino Rodríguez, saw Eggington become the European welterweight champion at Birmingham's Utilita Arena on 13 May 2017.

He lost the belt via split decision to Mohamed Mimoune from France in his next fight on 17 October 2017 at Manchester Arena.

Having moved up in weight divisions, Eggington won the vacant IBO super-welterweight World title on 25 June 2022, with a unanimous decision victory against Polish boxer Przemyslaw Zysk at Coventry Skydome.

Once again his title reign was a short one as he lost in his first defence by majority decision to Ireland's Australia-based Dennis Hogan at the Newcastle Entertainment Centre, Newcastle, New South Wales, Australia, on 8 October 2022.

On 1 March 2024, Eggington failed in his bid to become a two-time European champion when he lost by majority decision to German Abass Baraou in a contest for the vacant super-welterweight title in Telford.

He returned to winning ways with a six-round points success over Alan Sebastian Velazquez at The Premier Suite in Cannock on 28 November 2024.

Eggington faced WBC International Silver super-welterweight champion Lee Cutler at Resorts World Arena in Birmingham on 20 April 2025. At the start of the ninth round the fight was stopped on the advice of the ringside doctor due to a cut and swelling near the challenger's eye caused by an accidental clash of heads. As a result the contest went to the judges' scorecards with Eggington ruled the winner by unanimous technical decision.

He was given a Lifetime Achievement Award by the WBC in November 2025.

Egginton faced Conah Walker in a non-title catchweight bout at University of Wolverhampton at The Halls in Wolverhampton on 2 May 2026. He was sent to the canvas with a punch to his body in the eighth round and went on to lose via stoppage when the referee stepped in to halt the fight as Eggington sustained a series of unanswered blows in the 10th round. Later that month, Eggington announced his retirement from professional boxing.

== Professional boxing record ==
46 fights	36 wins	10 losses
By knockout	20	3
By decision	16	7

No.	Result	Record	Opponent	Type	Round, time	Date	Location	Notes
46	Loss	36–10	Conah Walker	TKO	10 (12), 1:59	2 May 2026	University of Wolverhampton at The Halls, Wolverhampton, England	
45	Win	36–9	Lee Cutler	UTD	9 (10)	20 Apr 2025	Resorts World Arena, Birmingham, England	Won WBC International Silver super-welterweight title
44	Win	35–9	Alan Sebastian Velazquez	PTS	6	28 Nov 2024	The Premier Suite, Cannock, England	
43	Loss	34–9	Abass Baraou	MD	12	1 Mar 2024	Telford International Centre, Telford, England	For vacant European light-middleweight title
42	Win	34–8	Joe Pigford	TKO	5 (12), 2:57	27 May 2023	Dean Court, Bournemouth, England	Won vacant WBA International light-middleweight title
41	Win	33–8	James McCarthy	TKO	4 (6), 1:52	30 Mar 2023	The Premier Suite, Cannock, England	
40	Loss	32–8	Dennis Hogan	MD	12	8 Oct 2022	Newcastle Entertainment Centre, Newcastle, Australia	Lost IBO light middleweight title
39	Win	32–7	Przemyslaw Zysk	UD	12	25 Jun 2022	Coventry Skydome, Coventry, England	Won vacant IBO light middleweight title
38	Win	31–7	Bilel Jkitou	SD	12	10 Sep 2021	Coventry Skydome, Coventry, England	Retained WBC Silver middleweight title
37	Win	30–7	Carlos Molina	UD	12	22 May 2021	Coventry Skydome, Coventry, England	Won vacant WBC Silver middleweight title
36	Win	29–7	Ashley Theophane	TKO	6 (10), 1:57	11 Dec 2020	Fly By Nite Rehearsal Studios, Redditch, England	
35	Loss	28–7	Ted Cheeseman	UD	12	1 Aug 2020	Matchroom Fight Camp, Brentwood, England	Lost IBF International light-middleweight title
34	Win	28–6	Daniel Urbanski	RTD	2 (4), 3:00	30 Nov 2019	Holte Suite at Villa Park, Birmingham, England	
33	Win	27–6	Orlando Fiordigiglio	TKO	2 (10), 1:30	19 Sep 2019	Tuscany Hall, Florence, Italy	Won IBF International light-middleweight title
32	Win	26–6	Lewis van Poetsch	PTS	6	3 Aug 2019	Oldham Leisure Centre, Oldham, England	
31	Win	25–6	Jordan Grannum	PTS	4	29 Jun 2019	Villa Park, Birmingham, England	
30	Loss	24–6	Liam Smith	TKO	5 (12), 2:00	30 Mar 2019	Echo Arena, Liverpool, England	For vacant WBC Silver light-middleweight title
29	Win	24–5	Sam Omidi	PTS	4	2 Feb 2019	Holte Suite, Villa Park, Birmingham	
28	Loss	23–5	Hassan Mwakinyo	TKO	2 (10), 1:02	8 Sep 2018	Arena Birmingham, Birmingham, England	
27	Win	23–4	Peter Kramer	TKO	4 (10), 2:03	30 Jun 2018	Villa Park, Birmingham, England	Won vacant IBO Continental light-middleweight title
26	Win	22–4	Achilles Szabo	TKO	2 (6), 1:41	21 Apr 2018	Echo Arena, Liverpool, England	
25	Loss	21–4	Mohamed Mimoune	SD	12	17 Oct 2017	Manchester Arena, Manchester, England	Lost European welterweight title
24	Win	21–3	Ceferino Rodríguez	KO	10 (12), 1:03	13 May 2017	Barclaycard Arena, Birmingham, England	Retained WBC International welterweight title; Won European welterweight title
23	Win	20–3	Paulie Malignaggi	KO	8 (12), 1:50	4 Mar 2017	The O2 Arena, London England	Retained WBC International welterweight title
22	Win	19–3	Frankie Gavin	TKO	8 (12), 2:42	22 Oct 2016	Barclaycard Arena, Birmingham, England	Won vacant WBC International welterweight title
21	Win	18–3	Daza Usher	KO	1 (6), 1:33	30 Jul 2016	First Direct Arena, Leeds, England	
20	Loss	17–3	Bradley Skeete	UD	12	5 Mar 2016	Genting Arena, Birmingham, England	Lost British and Commonwealth welterweight titles
19	Win	17–2	Dale Evans	UD	12	17 Oct 2015	Barclaycard Arena, Birmingham, England	Retained British and Commonwealth welterweight titles
18	Win	16–2	Glenn Foot	TD	8 (12), 3:00	18 Jul 2015	Manchester Arena, Manchester, England	Retained Commonwealth welterweight title; Won British welterweight title
17	Win	15–2	Joseph Lamptey	TKO	7 (12), 2:05	9 May 2015	Barclaycard Arena, Birmingham, England	Retained WBC International Silver welterweight title; Won vacant Commonwealth welterweight title
16	Win	14–2	Shayne Singleton	TKO	5 (12), 2:50	7 Mar 2015	Hull Arena, Hull, England	Won WBC International Silver welterweight title
15	Win	13–2	Sebastien Allais	TKO	1 (6), 1:45	15 Nov 2014	3Arena, Dublin, Ireland	
14	Win	12–2	Denton Vassell	TKO	8 (10), 2:36	13 Sep 2014	Phones 4u Arena, Manchester, England	
13	Win	11–2	Lewis van Poetsch	TKO	2 (6), 1:33	7 Jun 2014	Villa Park, Birmingham, England	
12	Win	10–2	William Warburton	PTS	6	19 Apr 2014	Phones 4u Arena, Manchester, England	
11	Loss	9–2	Johnny Coyle	SD	3	5 Apr 2014	York Hall, London, England	Prizefighter 34: The Welterweights IV - Semi-final
10	Win	9–1	Johnny Garton	TKO	2 (3), 2:31	5 Apr 2014	York Hall, London, England	Prizefighter: The Welterweights IV - Quarter-final
9	Win	8–1	Dave Ryan	PTS	10	23 Nov 2013	Villa Park, Birmingham, England	
8	Win	7–1	Kevin McCauley	TKO	7 (10), 1:20	6 Oct 2013	Tower Ballroom, Birmingham, England	
7	Win	6–1	Andrew Patterson	PTS	4	11 May 2013	The Spa, Scarborough, England	
6	Win	5–1	Steven Pearce	TKO	7 (10), 2:50	3 May 2013	The Venue, Dudley, England	Won Midlands Area welterweight title
5	Win	4–1	Andrew Patterson	KO	2 (4), 1:15	24 Feb 2013	Institute (formerly Digbeth Civic Hall), Birmingham, England	
4	Loss	3–1	Dale Evans	UD	3	19 Jan 2013	Wolverhampton Civic Hall, Wolverhampton, England	Prizefighter: The Welterweights III - Quarter-final
3	Win	3–0	Andrew Hardy	PTS	4	1 Dec 2012	Hilton Hotel, Coventry, England	
2	Win	2–0	Charlie Thompson	PTS	4	19 Oct 2012	Holiday Inn, Birmingham, England	
1	Win	1–0	Leon Findlay	PTS	4	14 Sep 2012	Oceana, Swansea, Wales	
