= Denton Vassell =

English boxer (born 13th September 1984)

Personal information
- Nickname: Quiet Storm
- Nationality: British
- Born: 13 September 1984 (age 41) Manchester, England
- Height: 5 ft 8 in (1.73 m)
- Weight: Welterweight, Super-welterweight

Boxing career
- Stance: Orthodox

Boxing record
- Total fights: 31
- Wins: 25
- Win by KO: 11
- Losses: 6

Official Instagram

Denton Vassell (born Ancoats 13 September 1984) is an English former professional boxer. He held the Commonwealth welterweight title from April 2010 until June 2013.

Family/Cousin; Marvin "The Black Mamba' Tomlinson Professional Boxer @itsthemamba Official Instagram

@denton.vassellpt Official Instagram

== Amateur career ==
The pinnacle of Vassell's amateur career was winning the 69 kg division at the Amateur Boxing Association Championships in December 2005.

== Professional career ==
Vassell made his professional debut on 2 September 2006, scoring a third round technical knockout win against Ernie Smith at Bolton Arena.

After winning his first 14 pro-fights, he claimed the vacant Commonwealth welterweight title with a unanimous decision victory over Lee Purdy at Robin Park Centre in Wigan on 16 April 2010.

Returning to the same venue, Vassell made a successful first defense of the title on 26 March 2011, defeating Bethuel Ushona by unanimous decision.

He retained the title twice more thanks to a unanimous decision win over Samuel Colomban in Oldham on 12 November 2011 and a sixth round stoppage of Ronnie Heffron at Manchester Arena on 30 November 2012.

Vassell faced unbeaten British welterweight champion, Frankie Gavin, at Liverpool Olympia on 28 June 2013, with both their titles up for grabs. He suffered a heavy onslaught of blows in the seventh round and sustained a broken jaw which caused the fight to be stopped on the advice of the ringside doctor at the end of the round.

He continued fighting for a further six years without winning another title with his final bout being a second round stoppage defeat to future world champion Tim Tszyu at Hordern Pavilion in Sydney, Australia, on 8 February 2019.

== Professional boxing record ==
25 Wins (11 knockouts), 6 Losses, 0 Draws
Res.	Record	Opponent	Type	Rd.	Date	Location	Notes
Loss	25–6	(Australia) Tim Tszyu	TKO	2 (12)	2019-02-08	(Australia) Hordern Pavilion, Sydney	
Loss	25–5	(Lithuania) Evaldas Korsakas	RTD	2 (10)	2018-06-15	(United Kingdom) Middleton Arena, Middleton	
Win	25–4	(United Kingdom) Jordan Grannum	PTS	4	2017-11-04	(United Kingdom) Bowlers Exhibition Centre, Manchester	
Win	24–4	(Lithuania) Edvinas Puplauskas	PTS	4	2017-07-29	(United Kingdom) Bowlers Exhibition Centre, Manchester	
Loss	23–4	(Spain) Kerman Lejarraga	TKO	4 (12)	2016-06-04	(Spain) Frontón Bizkaia, Bilbao	For WBA International Welterweight Title
Win	23–3	(United Kingdom) Chris Jenkinson	PTS	4	2015-07-10	(England) Piccadilly Hotel, Manchester	
Win	22–3	(United Kingdom) Gary Boulden	PTS	6	2015-06-13	(England) Evoque Nightclub, Church Street, Preston	
Loss	21–3	(Ukraine) Viktor Plotnikov	UD	12	2015-02-28	(Northern Ireland) Odyssey Arena, Belfast	For vacant IBF Inter-Continental Welterweight Title
Win	21–2	(United Kingdom) Craig Kelly	TKO	6 (10)	2015-01-26	(Scotland) Radisson Blu Hotel, Glasgow	
Loss	20–2	(United Kingdom) Sam Eggington	TKO	8 (10)	2014-09-13	(England) Phones 4u Arena (formerly M.E.N Arena), Manchester	
Loss	20–1	(United Kingdom) Frankie Gavin	TKO	7 (12)	2013-06-28	(England) Olympia, Liverpool	Lost Commonwealth welterweight title; for British welterweight title.
Win	20–0	(United Kingdom) Ronnie Heffron	TKO	6 (12)	2012-11-30	(England) M.E.N. Arena, Manchester	Retained Commonwealth welterweight title.
Win	19–0	(Australia) Samuel Colomban	UD	12	2011-11-12	(England) Oldham Sports Centre, Oldham, Greater Manchester	Retained Commonwealth welterweight title.
Win	18–0	(Nicaragua) Ronny McField	PTS	6	2011-07-16	(England) Oldham Sports Centre, Oldham, Greater Manchester	
Win	17–0	(Namibia) Bethuel Ushona	UD	12	2011-03-26	(England) Robin Park Centre, Wigan, Greater Manchester	Retained Commonwealth welterweight title.
Win	16–0	(Brazil) Jack Welson	TKO	3 (8)	2010-12-04	(England) Palace Hotel, Manchester	
Win	15–0	(United Kingdom) Lee Purdy	UD	12	2010-04-16	(England) Robin Park Centre, Wigan, Greater Manchester	Won vacant Commonwealth welterweight title.
Win	14–0	(Australia) Kevin McCauley	RTD	2 (6	2010-03-26	(England) Goresbrook Leisure Centre, Dagenham, Essex	
Win	13–0	(United Kingdom) Jamal Morrison	PTS	6	2009-11-27	(England) Robin Park Centre, Wigan, Greater Manchester	
Win	12–0	(Estonia) Vasile Surcica	PTS	6	2009-09-25	(England) Manchester Velodrome, Manchester	
Win	11–0	(United Kingdom) Eddie Corcoran	TKO	6 (8)	2009-03-14	(England) Manchester Arena, Manchester	
Win	10–0	(United States) Matt Scriven	TKO	3 (6)	2009-01-30	(England) York Hall, Bethnal Green, London	
Win	9–0	(United Kingdom) Alex Spitko	KO	3 (6)	2008-10-10	(England) Everton Park Sports Centre, Liverpool, Merseyside	
Win	8–0	(United Kingdom) Jimmy Beech	PTS	6	2008-09-06	(England) M.E.N. Arena, Manchester	
Win	7–0	(Denmark) Manoocha Salari	TKO	3 (4)	2008-04-05	(England) Bolton Arena, Bolton, Greater Manchester	
Win	6–0	(United Kingdom) Yassine El Maachi	PTS	4	2007-12-08	(England) Bolton Arena, Bolton, Greater Manchester	
Win	5–0	(United Kingdom) Sherman Alleyne	TKO	1 (4)	2007-09-07	(England) Grosvenor House, Mayfair, London	
Win	4–0	(United Kingdom) Gatis Skuja	PTS	4	2007-08-11	(England) Olympia, Liverpool	
Win	3–0	(United Kingdom) Steve Cooper	RTD	1 (4)	2007-03-10	(England) Olympia, Liverpool	
Win	2–0	(United Kingdom) Duncan Cottier	PTS	4	2006-12-09	(England) ExCel Arena, Dockland, London	
Win	1–0	(United Kingdom) Ernie Smith	TKO	3 (4)	2006-09-02	(England) Bolton Arena, Bolton, Greater Manchester	
