= Kerman Lejarraga =

Spanish boxer (born 1992)

Personal information
- Nickname: El Revólver de Morga (The Revolver of Morga)
- Nationality: Spanish
- Born: Kerman Lejarraga Arana; 19 February 1992 (age 34) Bilbao, Basque Country, Spain
- Height: 1.75 m (5 ft 9 in)
- Weight: Welterweight; Light-middleweight

Boxing career
- Stance: Orthodox

Boxing record
- Total fights: 37
- Wins: 34
- Win by KO: 26
- Losses: 3

Kerman Lejarraga Arana (born 19 February 1992) is a Spanish professional boxer. He has held the European welterweight and super-welterweight titles.

== Professional career ==
Lejarraga won the vacant European welterweight title by stopping Bradley Skeete in the second round of their fight at Bilbao Arena in Bilbao, Spain, on 28 April 2018.

He successfully defended the title by knocking out Frankie Gavin in the fourth round at Bilbao Exhibition Centre in Baracaldo, Spain, on 17 November 2018.

Lejarraga lost the title to David Avanesyan back at Bilbao Arena on 30 March 2019, going down to a ninth round stoppage defeat. A rematch was held at the same venue on 28 September 2019, with Avanesyan winning by first round knockout.

He defeated Tyrone Nurse by unanimous decision in a 10-round contest at Plaza de Toros de Puerto Banus in Marbella, Spain, on 8 August 2020.

On 11 September 2021, Lejarraga fought Dylan Charrat fur the vacant European super-welterweight title at Pabellón de la Vall d'Hebron in Barcelona, Spain. The bout was stopped in the 10th round due to an eye injury sustained by Lejarraga in an accidental clash of heads. He won by majority technical decision with the judges' scorecards reading 96-94, 96-94, 95-95 in favor of Lejarraga.

Lejarraga beat Jack Flatley by knockout in the ninth round at the Bilbao Arena on 3 December 2021 to retain his title.

In his next bout, Lejarraga fought JJ Metcalf for the vacant WBA super-welterweight title at Bilbao Arena, losing via unanimous decision.

== Professional boxing record ==
| 37 fights | 34 wins | 3 losses |
|---|---|---|
| By knockout | 26 | 2 |
| By decision | 8 | 1 |

| No. | Result | Record | Opponent | Type | Round, time | Date | Location | Notes |
|---|---|---|---|---|---|---|---|---|
| 37 | Loss | 34–3 | James Metcalf | UD | 10 | 20 May 2022 | Bilbao Arena, Bilbao, Spain | For vacant WBA Continental super welterweight title. |
| 36 | Win | 34–2 | Jack Flatley | KO | 9 (12), 0:35 | 3 Dec 2021 | Bilbao Arena, Bilbao, Spain | EBU European super welterweight title. |
| 35 | Win | 33–2 | Dylan Charrat | TD | 10 (12), 3:00 | 11 Sep 2021 | Pabellón de la Vall d'Hebron, Barcelona Spain | Won vacant EBU European super welterweight title Lejarraga injured right eye after an accidental clash of heads. |
| 34 | Win | 32–2 | Jez Smith | TKO | 7 (10), 2:55 | 23 Apr 2021 | Palau Olimpic, Badalona Spain | |
| 33 | Win | 31–2 | Tyrone Nurse | UD | 10 | 8 Aug 2020 | Plaza de Toros de Puerto Banus, Marbella, Spain | |
| 32 | Win | 30–2 | Jose de Jesus Macias | UD | 10 | 29 Feb 2020 | Navarra Arena, Pamplona, Spain | |
| 31 | Win | 29–2 | Anderson Clayton | KO | 1 (8) | 30 Nov 2019 | Pabellón de la Vall d'Hebron, Barcelona, Spain | |
| 30 | Loss | 28–2 | David Avanesyan | TKO | 1 (12) | 28 Sep 2019 | Bilbao Arena, Bilbao, Spain | For European welterweight title |
| 29 | Win | 28–1 | Luis Solis | KO | 4 (10) | 8 Jun 2019 | Bilbao Arena, Bilbao, Spain | Won vacant WBC Latino super welterweight title |
| 28 | Loss | 27–1 | David Avanesyan | TKO | 9 (12) | 30 Mar 2019 | Bilbao Arena, Bilbao, Spain | Lost European welterweight title |
| 27 | Win | 27–0 | Frankie Gavin | KO | 4 (12) | 17 Nov 2018 | Bilbao Exhibition Centre, Baracaldo, Spain | Retained European welterweight title |
| 26 | Win | 26–0 | Johnny Navarrete | TKO | 6 (10) | 4 Aug 2018 | Palacio de Congresos, Marbella, Spain | |
| 25 | Win | 25–0 | Bradley Skeete | TKO | 2 (12) | 28 Apr 2018 | Bilbao Arena, Bilbao, Spain | Won vacant European welterweight title |
| 24 | Win | 24–0 | José del Río | UD | 10 | 11 Nov 2017 | Bilbao Arena, Bilbao, Spain | Won Spanish welterweight title |
| 23 | Win | 23–0 | Azael Cosío | TKO | 3 (10) | 17 Jul 2017 | Pabellón Municipal, Castro Urdiales, Spain | |
| 22 | Win | 22–0 | José Antonio Abreu | TKO | 2 (8) | 9 Jun 2017 | Turning Stone Resort and Casino, Verona, New York, US | |
| 21 | Win | 21–0 | Krisztian Santas | KO | 1 (8) | 15 Apr 2017 | Palacio de los Deportes, San Pedro de Alcántara, Spain | |
| 20 | Win | 20–0 | Gabor Gorbics | RTD | 5 (10) | 11 Mar 2017 | Fronton Bizkaia, Bilbao, Spain | |
| 19 | Win | 19–0 | Jesús Gurrola | TKO | 6 (12) | 17 Dec 2016 | Fronton Bizkaia, Bilbao, Spain | Retained WBA International welterweight title |
| 18 | Win | 18–0 | Koba Karkashadze | KO | 4 (8) | 12 Nov 2016 | Bizkaia Arena, Barakaldo, Spain | |
| 17 | Win | 17–0 | Giorgi Ungiadze | TKO | 4 (10) | 30 Sep 2016 | Palacio Municipal de Deportes, Oviedo, Spain | |
| 16 | Win | 16–0 | Francisco Cordero | KO | 3 (6) | 22 Jul 2016 | Plaza de Toros La Cubierta, Leganés, Spain | |
| 15 | Win | 15–0 | Denton Vassell | TKO | 4 (12) | 4 Jun 2016 | Frontón Bizkaia, Bilbao, Spain | Retained WBA International welterweight title |
| 14 | Win | 14–0 | Laszlo Toth | UD | 12 | 19 Mar 2016 | Frontón Bizkaia, Bilbao, Spain | Won WBA International welterweight title |
| 13 | Win | 13–0 | Kim Poulsen | TKO | 2 (8) | 19 Dec 2015 | Frontón Bizkaia, Bilbao, Spain | |
| 12 | Win | 12–0 | Javier García Roche | TKO | 9 (10) | 10 Nov 2015 | Pabellón Municipal de Deportes La Casilla, Bilbao, Spain | |
| 11 | Win | 11–0 | Feliks Klein | TKO | 2 (6) | 1 Aug 2015 | Hotel Holiday World, Benalmadena, Spain | |
| 10 | Win | 10–0 | Jair Cortés | UD | 6 | 19 Jun 2015 | Pabellón Municipal de Deportes La Casilla, Bilbao, Spain | |
| 9 | Win | 9–0 | Marius Jacheanu | KO | 1 (6) | 15 May 2015 | Jai Alai, Gernika-Lumo, Spain | |
| 8 | Win | 8–0 | Miguel Aguilar | TKO | 3 (6) | 20 Sep 2014 | Pabellón Pedro Velarde, Maliaño, Spain | |
| 7 | Win | 7–0 | Nugzar Margvelashvili | TKO | 1 (6) | 22 Jul 2014 | Hipodromo de La Zarzuela, Madrid, Spain | |
| 6 | Win | 6–0 | Santos Medrano | RTD | 4 (6) | 27 Jun 2014 | Pabellón Municipal de Deportes La Casilla, Bilbao, Spain | |
| 5 | Win | 5–0 | Santos Medrano | UD | 6 | 22 Feb 2014 | Polideportivo de Fadura, Getxo, Spain | |
| 4 | Win | 4–0 | Nugzar Margvelashvili | TKO | 2 (6) | 25 Jan 2014 | Polideportivo Municipal, Zamudio, Spain | |
| 3 | Win | 3–0 | Ignasi Caballero | TKO | 1 (4) | 28 Dec 2013 | Polideportivo Txurdinaga, Bilbao, Spain | |
| 2 | Win | 2–0 | Fran González | TKO | 2 (4) | 23 Nov 2013 | Polideportivo Judimendi, Vitoria-Gasteiz, Spain | |
| 1 | Win | 1–0 | Jair Cortés | PTS | 4 | 18 May 2013 | Pabellón Municipal de Deportes La Casilla, Bilbao, Spain | |
