= Conah Walker =

English boxer (born 1995)

Personal information
- Nickname: The Wolf
- Nationality: English
- Born: Conah Walker; 19 May 1995 (age 31)
- Weight: Welterweight

Boxing career
- Stance: Orthodox

Boxing record
- Total fights: 22
- Wins: 18
- Win by KO: 9
- Losses: 3
- Draws: 1

Conah Walker (born 19 May 1995) is an English professional boxer. He has held the IBF Intercontinental and WBA International welterweight titles since December 2025. Walker is also a former British and Commonwealth welterweight champion.

== Early life and amateur career ==
As a teenager, Walker was excluded from school and spent nearly two years in a junior detention centre. He joined Merridale ABC in Wolverhampton and compiled an amateur record of 30 wins from 33 bouts.

== Professional boxing career ==
Originally trained by former world champion Ricky Hatton, Walker made his professional boxing debut on 22 September 2018, recording a fourth round stoppage win over Jan Prokes. He claimed the vacant Midlands Area welterweight title thanks to a points success over Levi Ferguson in Sheffield on 28 May 2021.

On 19 August 2023, Walker won the WBA International welterweight title by defeating the previously unbeaten Cyrus Pattinson at Utilita Arena in Birmingham, knocking him to the canvas three times during the contest, before his opponent retired at the end of the eighth round.

He successfully defended his belt by stopping Lloyd Germain in round three at Ulster Hall in Belfast on 27 January 2024, but lost the title via unanimous decision to Lewis Crocker at Resorts World Arena in Birmingham on 22 June 2024.

Returning to the same venue, Walker got back to winning ways with a unanimous decision victory over former British champion Lewis Ritson on 30 November 2024. In his next fight, he won the British and Commonwealth welterweight titles with an 11th round stoppage of defending champion Harry Scarff at Nottingham Arena on 25 January 2025.

Having vacated the Commonwealth title, Walker made the first defense of his British championship against Liam Taylor at bp pulse LIVE Arena in Birmingham on 21 June 2025. He won via knockout in the seventh round.

Walker faced Pat McCormack for the vacant IBF Intercontinental and WBA International welterweight titles at Salle des Étoiles in Monte Carlo on 6 December 2025. He won by knockout in the final round, unleashing a barrage of punches which sent his opponent tumbling through the ropes and unable to beat the referee's 10 count. Shortly after the fight he vacated his British title.

In January 2026, Walker was named fighter of the year and given an outstanding achievement honour at the Midlands Boxing Awards.

He faced Sam Eggington in a non-title catchweight bout at University of Wolverhampton at The Halls in Wolverhampton on 2 May 2026. Walker sent his opponent to the canvas with a punch to his body in the eighth round and went on to win via stoppage when the referee stepped in to halt the fight as Eggington sustained a series of unanswered blows in the 10th round.

Again fighting at University of Wolverhampton at The Halls, he is scheduled to face Alexis Rocha in an eliminator for a shot at the WBA welterweight title on 5 December 2026.

== Professional boxing record ==
22 fights	18 wins	3 losses
By knockout	9	0
By decision	9	3
Draws	1	

No.	Result	Record	Opponent	Type	Round, time	Date	Location	Notes
22	Win	18–3–1	Sam Eggington	TKO	10 (12) 1:59	May 2, 2026	University of Wolverhampton at The Halls, Wolverhampton, England	
21	Win	17–3–1	Pat McCormack	KO	12 (12) 2:16	Dec 6, 2025	Salle des Étoiles, Monte Carlo, Monaco	Won vacant WBA International and IBF Inter-Continental welterweight titles
20	Win	16–3–1	Liam Taylor	KO	7 (12) 0:45	Jun 21, 2025	bp pulse LIVE, Birmingham, England	Retained British welterweight title
19	Win	15–3–1	Harry Scarff	TKO	11 (12) 1:23	Jan 25, 2025	Nottingham Arena, Nottingham, England	Won British and Commonwealth welterweight titles
18	Win	14–3–1	Lewis Ritson	UD	10	Nov 30, 2024	bp pulse LIVE, Birmingham, England	
17	Loss	13–3–1	Lewis Crocker	UD	10	Jun 22, 2024	bp pulse LIVE, Birmingham, England	
16	Win	13–2–1	Lloyd Germain	TKO	3 (10) 1:33	Jan 27, 2024	Ulster Hall, Belfast, Northern Ireland	Retained WBA International welterweight title
15	Win	12–2–1	Cyrus Pattinson	RTD	8 (10) 3:00	Aug 19, 2023	Uilita Arena, Birmingham, England	Won WBA International welterweight title
14	Loss	11–2–1	Kane Gardner	PTS	8	Mar 24, 2023	Bolton Whites Hotel, Bolton, England	
13	Win	11–1–1	Iliyan Markov	PTS	6	May 6, 2022	The Hangar Events Venue, Wolverhampton, England	
12	Loss	10–1–1	Samuel Antwi	UD	10	Feb 5, 2022	Cardiff International Arena, Cardiff, Wales	For English welterweight title
11	Win	10–0–1	Jack Ewbank	TKO	1 (6) 2:07	Oct 1, 2021	The Hangar Events Venue, Wolverhampton, England	
10	Win	9–0–1	Levi Ferguson	PTS	10	May 28, 2021	Sheffield Arena Carpark, Sheffield, England	Won Midlands Area welterweight title
9	Win	8–0–1	Nathan Bendon	PTS	6	Aug 22, 2020	Fly By Nite Rehearsal Studios, Redditch, England	
8	Win	7–0–1	Danny Little	PTS	4	Feb 22, 2020	Holte Suite, Villa Park, Birmingham, England	
7	Win	6–0–1	Edvinas Puplauskas	PTS	6	Oct 18, 2019	The Hangar Events Venue, Wolverhampton, England	
6	Draw	5–0–1	Ohio Kain Iremiren	PTS	6	July 28, 2019	The Venue, Dudley, England	
5	Win	5–0	Nathan Bendon	PTS	6	May 11, 2019	Walsall Town Hall, Walsall, England	
4	Win	4–0	Arvydas Trizno	KO	3 (6) 1:42	Mar 9, 2019	Walsall Town Hall, Walsall, England	
3	Win	3–0	Kevin McCauley	PTS	4	Dec 8, 2018	Walsall Town Hall, Walsall, England	
2	Win	2–0	Rudolf Durica	PTS	4	Oct 20, 2018	Kings Hall, Stoke-on-Trent, England	
1	Win	1–0	Jan Prokes	TKO	4 (4) 1:54	Sep 22, 2018	Walsall Town Hall, Walsall, England	
