= Harry Scarff =

English boxer (born 1993)

Personal information
- Nickname: Horrible
- Born: 8 July 1993 (age 32) Derby, Derbyshire, England
- Height: 6 ft 1 in (185 cm)
- Weight: Welterweight, Super-welterweight

Boxing career
- Stance: Orthodox

Boxing record
- Total fights: 17
- Wins: 13
- Win by KO: 3
- Losses: 4

Harry Scarff (born 8 July 1993) is an English professional boxer who is a former British, Commonwealth and IBF European welterweight champion. He has also held the English welterweight and super-welterweight titles.

== Career ==
Scarff claimed the first title of his professional career by defeating previously unbeaten English super-welterweight champion Jack Flatley at De Vire Whites in Bolton on 28 September 2019, winning via unanimous decision. In his next outing he faced Anthony Fowler for the vacant WBA International super-welterweight crown at Liverpool Arena on 23 November 2019. Scarff was knocked to the canvas in the ninth round and, although he recovered to finish the fight, lost by unanimous decision. The defeat was not only his first as a professional, but also cost him his English title due to a British Boxing Board of Control rule that states if a champion loses to another Englishman then the title becomes vacant even if the belt had not been on the line in the contest.

Scarff challenged IBF European champion Troy Williamson at York Hall in London on 15 August 2020, but lost by unanimous decision for the second successive bout.

Dropping down to welterweight, he became a two-weight English champion thanks to a unanimous decision victory over Louis Greene for the vacant title at Wembley Arena in London on 26 March 2022.

Scarff challenged unbeaten British, Commonwealth and IBF European welterweight champion Ekow Essuman at Manchester Arena on 18 November 2023. He won by unanimous decision. Along with the triple haul of titles, the win also earned him a fight against Karen Chukhadzhian in a final eliminator for a shot at the IBF world championship. Scarff lost the bout at Hotel Elysee in Hamburg, Germany, on 17 May 2024 via unanimous decision.

Scarff made the first defense of his British and Commonwealth titles against Conah Walker at Nottingham Arena on 25 January 2025. He was leading on all three of the ringside judges' scorecards when he was knocked to the canvas in round 11 and, despite making it back to his feet, the referee stepped in to halt the contest moments later.
