= The Deco =

The Deco at The Old Savoy
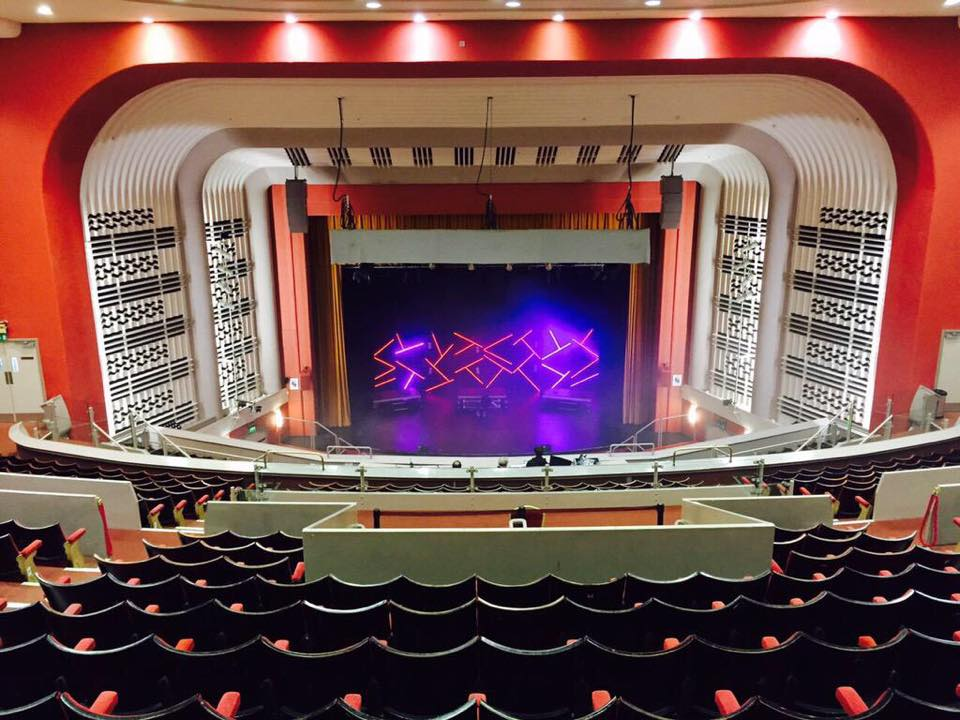
- Main Auditorium
- Interactive map of The Deco at The Old Savoy
- Address: Abington Square; Northampton, Northamptonshire
- Coordinates: 52.239972°N 0.88904°W
- Owner: The Old Savoy CIC
- Capacity: 925 (Auditorium); 400 (Doré suite); 400 (Glen suite)
- Current use: National touring productions Conference and Function room hire Meeting rooms

Construction
- Opened: 1936 (The Savoy)
- Rebuilt: 2004 (The Deco)

Listed Building – Grade II
- Official name: The Old Savoy, Northampton
- Designated: 19 October 1994
- Reference no.: 1249275
- Architect: WR Glen

Website
- The Deco website

The Deco is a restored 1930s cinema and theatre located in the heart of Northampton, England. It operates as a venue for corporate, social and theatrical events.

The Deco was designated a Grade II listed building in 2004. and originally featured a single large cinema room and theatre. Over the years the internal arrangement of the building has changed to consist of 3 main areas: a main 925 seat auditorium and 2 smaller 200 seater rooms, The Doré and The Glen, the latter being named after the original architect William Riddell Glen. The Deco features as part of the Northampton Heritage Trail,

The Old Savoy is a privately run theatre and one of a few unsubsidised independent theatres left in the UK.

== History ==
The Deco first opened on Saturday 2 May 1936 as "the Savoy", described as "Northampton’s only super Cinema". It was part of the ABC group designed by their house architect William Riddell Glen and built in under 9 months on the site of the original Technical College. It was constructed in the International Modernistic style with all the main features still in place and sympathetically renovated.

The Savoy was very popular and originally held almost 2000 people in the 696 seat circle and 1200 seat stalls. It was designed both as a cinema and theatre complete with orchestra pit. It hosted shows and concerts as well as films.

In the 1950s it was renamed the "ABC" in line with the group’s national branding policy and was the local venue of choice for the touring bands of the 60s including the Beatles in both March and November 1963 the Rolling Stones in 1965 and infamously PJ Proby in 1965 when he was arrested for splitting his trousers on stage!

A number of the 60s bands have returned to play the Deco in recent years including the Hollies, the Searchers and Billy J Kramer.

In 1974 it was converted to a 3 screen complex by using the rear of the stalls with a dividing wall for the 2 smaller screens and leaving the main auditorium circle as the main "ABC 1″.

By the mid-90s however the ABC, now renamed Cannon cinema, was unable to compete with the modern multiscreen complexes. The owning company (Credit Lyonnais, who had acquired Cannon studios and Cannon cinemas) also owned the MGM brand and built a new 9 screen MGM multiplex (now Odeon) at Sixfields Leisure Park to replace the Cannon. After the Sixfields cinema opened, the Cannon closed in 1995 with the name "Terminal Velocity".

Recently a Blue Plaque has been installed at the main entrance to commemorate the two performances of The Beatles in 1963.

== 21st century ==
The building was derelict for 5 years until 2000 when it was purchased by a Charitable Trust to be converted to a multi-purpose venue opening in October 2005 as the Deco

After the Charity closed the venue was purchased by The Old Savoy CIC and the site renamed The Old Savoy; it has been operated by Stage Right Productions for over 15 years as a venue for corporate, social and theatrical events.

== Facilities ==
The venue has over 7,250 sq ft of usable theatre or concert space in the main auditorium with an additional two large conference suites, The Glen and The Doré, having a further 3,900 sq ft. The main auditorium can accommodate 925 seated or 1,200 standing in stalls and seating in circle, and the suites have a capacity of 200 each when configured as a conference venue.
