= Stoke-upon-Trent Town Hall =

Municipal building in Stoke-upon-Trent, Staffordshire, England

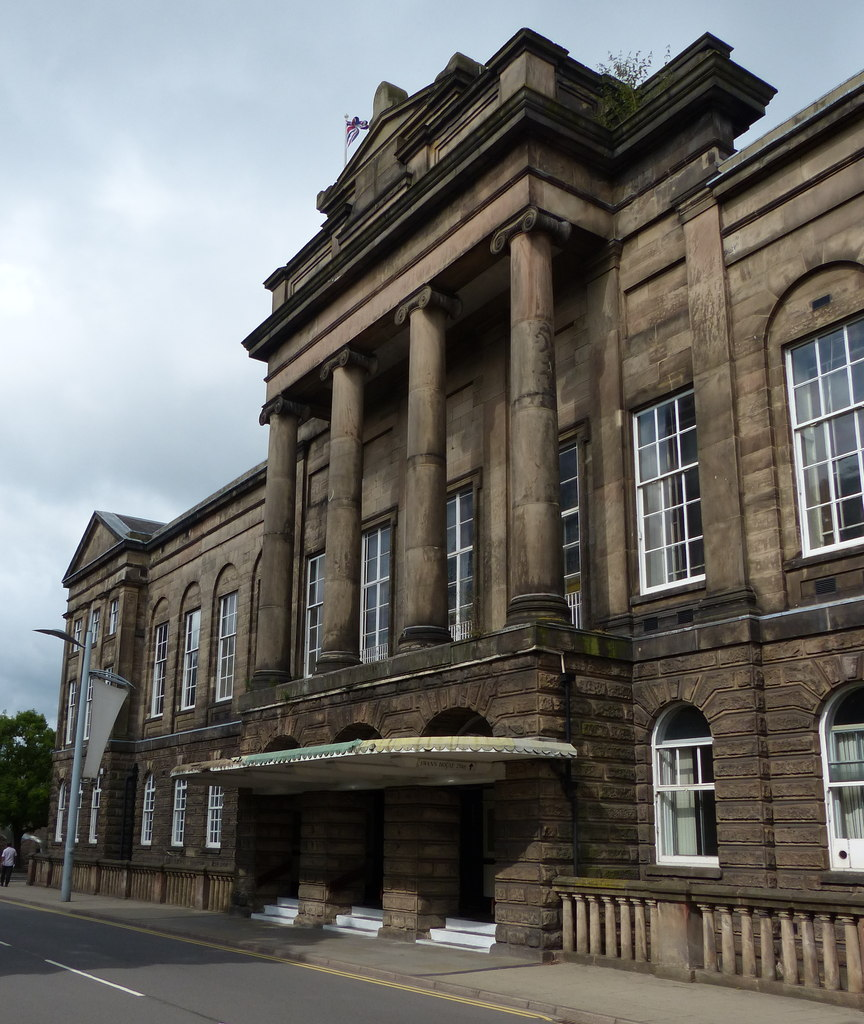
- Stoke-upon-Trent Town Hall

- Shown in Staffordshire
- 53.0047°N 2.1820°W
- Location: Glebe Street, Stoke-upon-Trent

History
- Built: 1834

Site notes
- Architect: Henry Ward
- Architectural style: Neoclassical style

Listed Building – Grade II*
- Official name: Stoke Town Hall complex including the Kings Hall and Jubilee Hall, and balustrade to Glebe Street
- Designated: 19 April 1972 (Grade II); 12 December 2025 (Grade II*)
- Reference no.: 1297959

Stoke-upon-Trent Town Hall is a municipal building in Glebe Street, Stoke-upon-Trent, Staffordshire, England. The town hall, which is the meeting place of Stoke-on-Trent City Council, is a Grade II* listed building.

== History ==
The first town hall in Stoke-upon-Trent was erected in the Market Place between Market Street (now known as Hill Street) and Hide Street in 1794: it had arcading on the ground floor to allow markets to be held and an assembly room was established on the first floor. After significant industrial growth in the early 19th century, particularly associated with the potteries industry, civic leaders decided to procure a larger structure: the site selected was north east of the original structure in the heart of the potteries manufacturing area. (Note: The first town hall was subsequently used as a fire station and then as a drill hall before being demolished just before the Second World War; the site is now occupied by a car park.)

The new building was designed by Henry Ward in the neoclassical style, built in rusticated stone on the ground floor and ashlar stone above and was completed in 1834. The design originally involved a symmetrical main frontage with just three bays facing onto the Glebe Street; it featured a large portico with three archways on the ground floor beneath four Ionic order columns supporting an entablature and a pediment. It was extended with a north wing for use by the police in 1842 and a south wing for use by the courts in around 1850. The outer bays in each of the two wings were slightly projected forward, enhanced with Ionic order pilasters on the first floor and pedimented as pavilions. Internally, the principal room was a market hall in the centre of the building, but the ground floor was remodelled in 1888 to convert the market hall into a public hall and to create a council chamber, a mayor's parlour and some municipal offices.

Assembly rooms known as the King's Hall and the Jubilee Hall were constructed to a design by Thomas Wallis and James Albert Bowden behind the main structure in 1911. The town hall became the headquarters of the new county borough of Stoke-on-Trent in 1910 and King George V and Queen Mary visited the town hall and announced the town's advancement to city status on 5 June 1925. The rock band, the Beatles, performed at a concert in the King's Hall on 26 January 1963. The building remained the local seat of government after the formation of the enlarged Stoke-on-Trent City Council in 1974.

The new city council inherited additional facilities at Unity House in Hanley which had been completed in 1973, but as part of an initiative to co-locate its staff, the city council vacated Unity House and constructed a civic centre to the immediate north of the town hall in 1992. In 2012 the city council announced its intention to relocate some of its staff back to Hanley but into a newly built facility there. After a programme of refurbishment works costing £1.5 million was completed in 2018, the register office moved from Hanley Town Hall into the newly-refurbished building in October 2020.
