= Tobia Giuseppe Loriga =

Italian boxer

Personal information
- Nickname: Lo Squalo Rossoblu
- Nationality: Italian
- Born: Tobia Giuseppe Loriga; March 1, 1977 (age 49) Crotone, Italy
- Height: 6 ft 0 in (184 cm)
- Weight: Welterweight; Light middleweight

Boxing career
- Reach: 74 in (189 cm)
- Stance: Orthodox

Boxing record
- Total fights: 45
- Wins: 33
- Win by KO: 6
- Losses: 9
- Draws: 3
- No contests: 0

Tobia Giuseppe Loriga (born 1 March 1977) is an Italian professional boxer. He is also the former Italy and IBF International Light Middleweight Champion.

== Professional career ==
On 26 April 2008 Tobia Giuseppe Loriga lost by ninth round KO to Julio César Chávez, Jr.
