= Dillian Whyte vs. Otto Wallin =

- Date: October 30, 2021 (cancelled)
- Venue: The O2 Arena, London, England
- Title(s) on the line: WBC interim heavyweight title

Tale of the tape
Boxer	Dillian Whyte	Otto Wallin
Nickname	The Body Snatcher	All In
Hometown	Brixton, London, England	Sundsvall, Sweden
Pre-fight record	28–2 (19 KOs)	22–1 (1) (14 KOs)
Height	6 ft 4 in (1.93 m)	6 ft 5 1/2 in (1.97 m)
Style	Orthodox	Southpaw
Recognition	WBC interim heavyweight champion	Former WBA Continental heavyweight champion

Dillian Whyte vs. Otto Wallin was a scheduled heavyweight professional boxing match contested between the defending WBC interim champion, Dillian Whyte, and former WBA Continental champion, Otto Wallin. The fight was scheduled to take place on October 30, 2021, at The O2 Arena in London, England.

The fight was cancelled after Dillian Whyte sustained an injury in training.

== Background ==
Dillian Whyte first won the vacant WBC interim heavyweight title when he defeated Óscar Rivas on 20 July 2019, in a bout in which he survived a ninth-round knockdown to claim a unanimous decision victory. He subsequently lost the title when he suffered a brutal knockout loss against Alexander Povetkin on 22 August 2020, before avenging his loss in an immediate rematch against Povetkin on 27 March 2021 to regain his title.

Otto Wallin had suffered his first professional defeat against former unified heavyweight champion Tyson Fury on 14 September 2019, but rebounded with a two-fight win streak coming into the fight against Whyte, having defeated American duo Travis Kauffman and Dominic Breazeale since his sole loss against Fury.

== Fight card ==
Weight class		vs.		Method	Round	Time	Note
Heavyweight	(United Kingdom) Dillian Whyte (ic)	vs.	(Sweden) Otto Wallin		– (12)		^{Note 1}
Light welterweight	(United Kingdom) Chantelle Cameron (c)	vs.	(United States) Mary McGee (c)		– (10)		^{Note 2}
Heavyweight	(Croatia) Alen Babić	vs.	(United States) Éric Molina
Light heavyweight	(United Kingdom) Craig Richards	vs.	(Poland) Marek Matyja
Super featherweight	(United Kingdom) Youssef Khoumari	vs.	(United States) Jorge David Castaneda				^{Note 3}
Heavyweight	(United Kingdom) Johnny Fisher	vs.	(Spain) Alvaro Terrero
Cruiserweight	(United Kingdom) Jordan Thompson	vs.	(Poland) Piotr Podlucki
Super bantamweight	(United Kingdom) Ellie Scotney	vs.	(Spain) Eva Cantos
Super middleweight	(United Kingdom) John Hedges	vs.	(United Kingdom) Antony Woolery

^Note 1 For WBC interim heavyweight title
^Note 2 For WBC, IBF, and inaugural The Ring female light welterweight titles
^Note 3 For WBC International super featherweight title
