= Xavier Miller =

Head coach of boxer Dillian Whyte

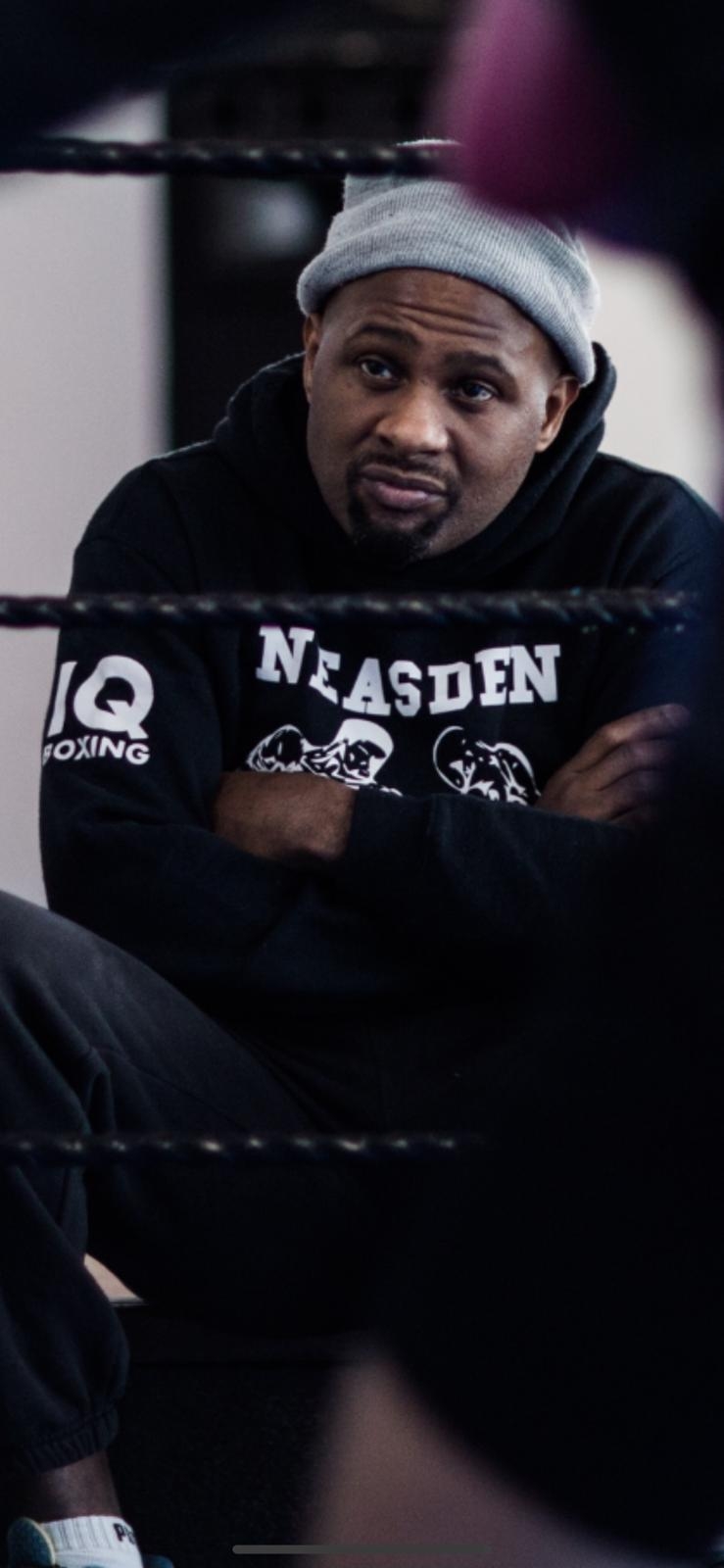
Xavier Miller

Xavier Miller is the head coach of British heavyweight boxer Dillian Whyte.

Miller was confirmed in the position in August 2020, prior to Whyte's fight with Alexander Povetkin on 22 August. He had been working with Whyte since his unanimous decision victory over Óscar Rivas in July 2019.

After the Povetkin fight at the headquarters of Matchroom Boxing in Brentwood, Essex, Miller returned to Whyte's camp in Portugal to continue training the heavyweight for the November 2020 rematch with the Russian.

Povetkin vs. Whyte II was pushed back to 27 March 2021 after Povetkin tested positive for COVID-19. Miller worked with newly introduced co-trainer Harold Knight to oversee Whyte's victory by technical knockout inside four rounds. Speaking to Sky Sports Boxing after the fight, Miller described Whyte's performance as "perfection".

Miller has previously worked with British heavyweight boxer Derek Chisora.

Along with Nick Prempeh, Miller is the co-owner and co-founder of IQ Boxing based at Neasden Boxing Club in North London. The duo started managing the club—located at Kingfisher Youth & Community Centre—in 2014, with the aim of producing amateur boxers who could represent GB Boxing or turn professional.
