= Formella =

Formella is a surname. Notable people with the surname include:

- Aleksandra Formella (born 2001), Polish sprinter and middle-distance runner
- Dariusz Formella (born 1995), Polish footballer
- John Formella (born 1986–87), Attorney General of New Hampshire
- Sebastian Formella (born 1987), German boxer
