= Michael McKinson =

English boxer (born 1994)

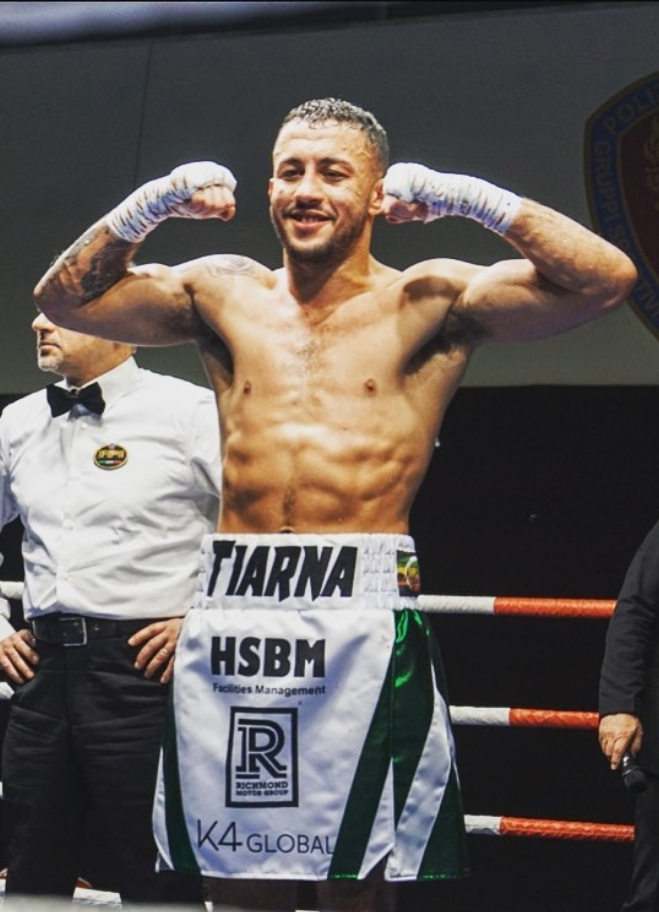

Personal information
- Nickname: The Problem
- Born: 17 April 1994 (age 32) Portsmouth, Hampshire, England
- Height: 5 ft 9 in (175 cm)
- Weight: Welterweight

Boxing career
- Stance: Southpaw

Boxing record
- Total fights: 29
- Wins: 27
- Win by KO: 4
- Losses: 2

Michael McKinson (born 17 April 1994) is an English professional boxer. He defeated Evgenii Pavko by unanimous decision to win the vacant WBO European welterweight title in Brentwood, Essex, on 20 July 2019. McKinson also claimed the WBO Global welterweight title with a unanimous decision success over defending champion Chris Kongo in Gibraltar on 27 March 2021. He fought Tulani Mbenge for the vacant IBO welterweight title at the Copper Box Arena in London on 19 October 2024, but lost by unanimous decision.

== Professional boxing record ==
29 fights	27 wins	2 losses
By knockout	4	1
By decision	23	1

No.	Result	Record	Opponent	Type	Round, time	Date	Location	Notes
29	Win	27–2	Ryan Frost	PTS	6	Dec 14, 2024	Harrow Leisure Centre, Harrow, England	
28	Loss	26–2	Tulani Mbenge	UD	12	Oct 19, 2024	Copper Box Arena, London, England	For vacant IBO welterweight title
27	Win	26–1	Musah Lawson	UD	10	Dec 10, 2023	Bournemouth International Centre, Bournemouth, England	Won WBC International welterweight title
26	Win	25–1	Lebin Morales	TKO	7 (8), 1:25	27 May 2023	Dean Court, Bournemouth, England	
25	Win	24–1	Sergio Dos Santos Carvalho	TKO	5 (8), 3:00	18 Mar 2023	Rome, Italy	
24	Win	23–1	Roberto Arriaza	PTS	6	17 Dec 2022	Bournemouth International Centre, Bournemouth, England	
23	Loss	22–1	Vergil Ortiz Jr.	TKO	9 (12), 0:27	6 Aug 2022	Dickies Arena, Fort Worth, Texas, U.S.	
22	Win	22–0	Alex Martin	UD	10	19 Mar 2022	Galen Center, Los Angeles, California, U.S.	
21	Win	21–0	Przemyslaw Runowski	UD	10	14 Aug 2021	Matchroom Sport Headquarters, Brentwood, England	Retained WBO Global welterweight title
20	Win	20–0	Chris Kongo	UD	10	27 Mar 2021	Europa Point Sports Complex, Gibraltar	Won WBO Global welterweight title
19	Win	19–0	Martin Harkin	UD	10	18 Oct 2020	York Hall, London, England	
18	Win	18–0	Luis Alberto Veron	UD	10	9 Nov 2019	York Hall, London, England	
17	Win	17–0	Evgeny Pavko	UD	10	20 Jul 2019	Brentwood Centre, Brentwood, England	Won vacant WBO European welterweight title
16	Win	16–0	Ryan Kelly	UD	10	9 Mar 2019	Brentwood Centre, Brentwood, England	Retained WBC Silver International welterweight title
15	Win	15–0	Sammy McNess	UD	10	26 Oct 2018	York Hall, London, England	Retained WBC Silver International welterweight title
14	Win	14–0	Kevin McCauley	PTS	4	14 Jul 2018	Civic Hall, Grays, England	
13	Win	13–0	Colin Lynes	TKO	6 (10), 2:51	25 Nov 2017	Mountbatten Centre, Portsmouth, England	Won vacant WBC Silver International welterweight title
12	Win	12–0	Mario Petrov	PTS	6	22 Sep 2017	Westcroft Leisure Centre, Carshalton, England	
11	Win	11–0	Ryan Martin	UD	10	8 Apr 2017	Oasis Leisure Centre, Swindon, England	Won vacant WBC Youth welterweight title
10	Win	10–0	Duane Green	PTS	6	10 Dec 2016	Liquid & Envy Nightclub, Portsmouth, England	
9	Win	9–0	Ali Wyatt	PTS	4	12 Nov 2016	Metropole Hotel, Brighton, England	
8	Win	8–0	Stanislav Nenkov	PTS	6	13 Mar 2016	Liquid & Envy Nightclub, Portsmouth, England	
7	Win	7–0	Casey Blair	PTS	4	21 Nov 2015	York Hall, London, England	
6	Win	6–0	Jerome Samuels	RTD	3 (4), 3:00	4 Jul 2015	O2 Academy, Bournemouth, England	
5	Win	5–0	Dan Carr	PTS	4	28 Mar 2015	Mountbatten Centre, Portsmouth, England	
4	Win	4–0	Aleksas Vaseris	PTS	4	7 Feb 2015	Devenish Complex, Belfast, Northern Ireland	
3	Win	3–0	Teodor Nikolov	PTS	4	22 Nov 2014	Devenish Complex, Belfast, Northern Ireland	
2	Win	2–0	Pawel Seliga	PTS	4	1 Nov 2014	Downpatrick Cricket Club, Downpatrick, Northern Ireland	
1	Win	1–0	Jan Salamacha	PTS	4	4 Oct 2014	Devenish Complex, Belfast, Northern Ireland	
