= Bilal Fawaz =

British Nigerian professional boxer (born 1988)

Personal information
- Nickname: Machine
- Born: Bilal Kelvin Fawaz; 3 April 1988 (age 38) Lagos, Nigeria
- Height: 6 ft 0 in (183 cm)
- Weight: Super-welterweight

Boxing career
- Stance: Orthodox

Boxing record
- Total fights: 15
- Wins: 13
- Win by KO: 5
- Losses: 1
- Draws: 1

Bilal Kelvin Fawaz (born 3 April 1988) is a stateless professional boxer and musician born in Nigeria. He has held the British and Commonwealth super-welterweight titles since February 2026. As an amateur Fawaz was Amateur Boxing Association of England light-middleweight champion and represented England internationally six times. He is variously credited as Bilal Fawaz or Kelvin Fawaz and in artistic output as NaijaBoy and as State Lezz.

== Early life ==
Fawaz was born in Nigeria to a mother who was an immigrant from Benin and a father of Lebanese origin who didn't have Nigerian citizenship either. Fawaz says he had a difficult childhood. His mother abused him and his father took him away, eventually leaving him with an "uncle", a relative or a family friend in Lagos. When Fawaz was 14, his "uncle" decided to take him to London, England "to reunite" him with his father. His mother had already been murdered in religious riots. Fawaz stayed in the UK starting age 14 on temporary permits without immigration papers ever since. On arriving in London in 2002, Fawaz was put with a family who he says regularly abused him, trafficking him into "domestic servitude". After escaping the foster family at age 15, the British social services public system put him in a group foster home in west London until he turned 16, then moving him to a halfway house for older teenagers. Eventually he was granted temporary leave until the age of 18 and has been legally in the UK ever since.

== Amateur career ==
Fawaz began to train as an amateur boxer. He got his start in boxing through a sports day event at Brunel University in Uxbridge. After a few months, he moved to the All Stars gym, a long-running local club with a reputation for working with troubled young men. He married in 2011 but the marriage eventually broke down in 2014. He has received a National Diploma in sports science. In early 2012, he won the Amateur Boxing Association (ABA) national championships, becoming light middleweight champion of England. He later held the London middleweight title. He acquired championship belts in three different weight classes. He represented England internationally for six times including against Nigeria, Germany, Sweden, Ireland. He was considered for Team GB for both the 2012 and 2016 Olympics, but was unable to take part because he had no British passport.

== Professional career ==
In 2014, the English boxing manager and promoter Frank Warren offered Fawaz a professional contract. He was forced to turn the reported £200,000 down because of his immigration status forbidding him any legal income. He is trained and managed by Aamir Ali, the owner of Stonebridge Boxing Club in Harlesden, London Borough of Brent. Fawaz also helps youngsters in the gym, training them in boxing.

On 12 February 2022 Fawaz made his professional boxing debut at York Hall, London, scoring a technical knockout win in the third round. He became the Southern Area middleweight champion on 25 November, beating Gideon Onyenani by unanimous decision.

Fawaz would next face Junaid Bostan for the vacant BBBofC English Super Welterweight title at the Indigo at The O2 in London on 31 January 2025. The fight resulted a split draw. A rematch took place at Sheffield Arena on 11 October 2025, with Fawaz winning by majority decision to take the title.

He challenged British and Commonwealth super-welterweight champion Ishmael Davis at Nottingham Arena on 21 February 2026. Fawaz won by majority decision with two of the ringside judges seeing the fight 115–113 and 115–114 respectively in his favour, overruling the third who had it a 114–114 draw.

On 2 May 2026, he successfully defended his titles against Ryan Kelly at University of Wolverhampton at The Halls in Wolverhampton when his opponent retired at the end of the ninth round.

Fawaz made his next defense against Eithan James at the Utilita Arena in Birmingham on 3 October 2026. He sent to his opponent to the canvas twice in the eighth round with the referee waving the contest off and handing him the win by technical knockout following the second knockdown.

== Personal life ==
For more than a decade, the British authorities have tried to deport Fawaz. He applied and appealed for extended leave; he also applied for a spousal visa; and in one case asked to be registered as stateless person. All these requests were turned down by the Home Office, which considers his presence in the UK undesirable. In 2017, they attempted to deport him through a programme called Operation Nexus, a joint initiative between UK police forces and immigration enforcement. He was arrested on the premises of Stonebridge Boxing Club where he was living for a while surviving on donations and sponsorship from the club. On 29 November 2017, he was arrested and put in Tinsley House immigration removal centre in Gatwick for 5 weeks. Fawaz was released on bail on 2 January 2018 by an immigration tribunal appeals judge, and after a public outcry and a petition demanding his release with 117,000 signatures collected. The Labour MP for Hayes and Harlington John McDonnell and England Boxing both appealed to the authorities on the boxer's behalf. He has to sign-in weekly with the immigration authorities.

Adopting the artistic name NaijaBoy, Bilal Fawaz has also released a number of recordings and music videos including "Did You See" in 2017 and "I'm Ready", "What More Do You Need" and "Body on Me" in 2018 as NaijaBoy. Under the alternative name State Lezz, he released a cover of "Mi Gente" in 2017, "Smoke and Juice", "You Know You Want It" and "What You Mean" in 2018 and "Wakanda", "My Layer" and "My Layer" in 2019.

== Professional boxing record ==
15 fights	13 wins	1 loss
By knockout	5	0
By decision	8	1
Draws	1	

No.	Result	Record	Opponent	Type	Round, time	Date	Location	Notes
15	Win	13–1–1	Eithan James	TKO	8 (12), 1:14	3 Oct 2026	Utilita Arena, Birmingham, England	Retained British and Commonwealth super-welterweight titles
14	Win	12–1–1	Ryan Kelly	RTD	9 (12), 3:00	2 May 2026	University of Wolverhampton at The Halls, Wolverhampton, England	Retained British and Commonwealth super-welterweight titles
13	Win	11–1–1	Ishmael Davis	MD	12	21 Feb 2026	Nottingham Arena, Nottingham, England	Won British and Commonwealth super-welterweight titles
12	Win	10–1–1	Junaid Bostan	MD	10	11 Oct 2025	Sheffield Arena, Sheffield, England	Won vacant English super-welterweight title
11	Draw	9–1–1	Junaid Bostan	SD	10	31 Jan 2025	Indigo at the O2, Greenwich, London, England	For vacant English super-welterweight title
10	Win	9–1	Ryan Amos	PTS	10	12 Oct 2024	York Hall, Bethnal Green, London, England	
9	Win	8–1	Adam Cieslak	PTS	4	8 Jun 2024	York Hall, Bethnal Green, London, England	
8	Win	7–1	Jordan Grannum	PTS	4	10 Feb 2024	York Hall, Bethnal Green, London, England	
7	Win	6–1	Gideon Onyenani	PTS	10	25 Nov 2023	York Hall, Bethnal Green, London, England	Won vacant British Southern Area middleweight title
6	Win	5–1	Serge Ambomo	PTS	6	9 Sep 2023	York Hall, Bethnal Green, London, England	
5	Loss	4–1	Ayoub Zakari	PTS	4	25 Nov 2022	York Hall, Bethnal Green, London, England	
4	Win	4–0	Serge Ambomo	PTS	4	1 Oct 2022	York Hall, Bethnal Green, London, England	
3	Win	3–0	Jean de Souza Freire	TKO	3 (4), 1:50	3 Sep 2022	Tolworth Recreation Centre, London, England	
2	Win	2–0	Malam Varela	TKO	3 (4), 3:00	26 Feb 2022	SSE Hydro, Glasgow, Scotland	
1	Win	1–0	Vladimir Fleischhauer	TKO	3 (4), 1:41	11 Feb 2022	York Hall, Bethnal Green, London, England	
