= Eithan James =

English boxer (born 2000)

Personal information
- Nickname: Jammy
- Born: 16 September 2000 (age 26) Kettering, Northamptonshire, England
- Height: 5 ft 9 in (175 cm)
- Weight: Super-welterweight, Welterweight, Flyweight

Boxing career
- Stance: Orthodox

Boxing record
- Total fights: 20
- Wins: 17
- Win by KO: 0
- Losses: 3
Medal record
Boxing
Representing England
Commonwealth Youth Games
Gold medal – first place	2017 Bahamas	Flyweight

Eithan James (born 16 September 2000) is an English professional boxer. He is a former WBO European welterweight champion and has also held the IBO Continental and Commonwealth International super-welterweight titles.

== Amateur career ==
Representing England, James won a gold medal in the flyweight division at the 2017 Commonwealth Youth Games in the Bahamas. He also won five national amateur titles.

== Professional career ==
Having turned professional in 2020, James claimed the vacant WBO European welterweight title with a unanimous decision win over James Moorcroft at the International Centre in Telford on 29 July 2023.

He made the first defense of his title against Owen Cooper at Resorts World Arena in Birmingham on 16 March 2024, with the vacant English welterweight championship also on the line. James was knocked to the canvas in the first round and, despite recovering to continue the fight, eventually lost when his corner retired him at the end of round nine.

Returning to the same venue on 2 November 2024, James got back to winning ways via a unanimous decision success over the previously unbeaten Jermaine Osbourne-Edwards.

He faced Constantin Ursu for the vacant Commonwealth welterweight title at York Hall in London on 30 March 2025, losing by stoppage in the seventh round.

In his next outing, James defeated Khya Preston on points over six rounds at the Mercure Hotel in Northampton on 25 July 2025.

Moving up in weight divisions, he faced Dom Hunt for the vacant IBO Continental super-welterweight title at Bolton Stadium Hotel in Bolton on 21 March 2026. James won via unanimous decision.

He fought Hamza Azeem for the vacant Commonwealth International super-welterweight title at the Park Inn Hotel in Northampton on 17 July 2026, winning on points 98–92.

James challenged British and Commonwealth super-welterweight champion Bilal Fawaz at the Utilita Arena in Birmingham on 3 October 2026. He was sent to the canvas twice in the eighth round with the referee waving the contest off and handing his opponent the win by technical knockout following the second knockdown.

== Professional boxing record ==
20 fights	17 wins	3 losses
By knockout	0	3
By decision	17	0

No.	Result	Record	Opponent	Type	Round, time	Date	Location	Notes
20	Loss	17–3	Bilal Fawaz	TKO	8 (12), 1:14	3 Oct 2026	Utilita Arena, Birmingham, England	For British and Commonwealth super-welterweight titles
19	Win	17–2	Hamza Azeem	PTS	10	17 Jul 2026	Park Inn Hotel, Northampton, England	Won vacant Commonwealth International super-welterweight title
18	Win	16–2	Dom Hunt	UD	10	21 Mar 2026	Whites Hotel, Bolton, England	Won vacant IBO Continental super-welterweight title
17	Win	15–2	Eduardo Vera Sanchez	PTS	6	12 Dec 2025	Park Inn Hotel, Northampton, England	
16	Win	14–2	Khya Preston	PTS	6	25 Jul 2025	Park Inn Hotel, Northampton, England	
15	Loss	13–2	Constantin Ursu	KO	7 (12), 0:43	30 Mar 2025	York Hall, Bethnal Green, London, England	For vacant Commonwealth welterweight title
14	Win	13–1	Jermaine Osbourne-Edwards	UD	10	2 Nov 2024	bp pulse LIVE, Birmingham, England	
13	Loss	12–1	Owen Cooper	RTD	9 (10), 3:00	16 Mar 2024	bp pulse LIVE, Birmingham, England	Lost WBO European welterweight title; For vacant English welterweight title
12	Win	12–0	James Moorcroft	UD	10	29 Jul 2023	Telford International Centre, Telford, England	Won vacant WBO European welterweight title
11	Win	11–0	Georgi Velichkov	PTS	6	15 Apr 2023	Copper Box Arena, London, England	
10	Win	10–0	Keanen Wainwright	PTS	10	19 Nov 2022	Telford International Centre, Telford, England	
9	Win	9–0	Lee Connelly	PTS	8	11 Jun 2022	Telford International Centre, Telford, England	
8	Win	8–0	Ben Fields	PTS	8	16 Apr 2022	Telford International Centre, Telford, England	
7	Win	7–0	Stu Greener	PTS	8	6 Nov 2021	Utilita Arena, Birmingham, England	
6	Win	6–0	Matar Sambou	PTS	6	28 Aug 2021	Utilita Arena, Birmingham, England	
5	Win	5–0	Clayton Bricknell	PTS	6	27 Mar 2021	Copper Box Arena, London, England	
4	Win	4–0	Kris Pilkington	PTS	4	26 Sep 2020	York Hall, Bethnal Green, London, England	
3	Win	3–0	Michael Mooney	PTS	4	22 Feb 2020	York Hall, Bethnal Green, London, England	
2	Win	2–0	Daryl Pearce	PTS	4	30 Nov 2019	Utilita Arena, Birmingham, England	
1	Win	1–0	Fonz Alexander	PTS	4	27 Sep 2019	Royal Albert Hall, London, England	
