= Owen Cooper (boxer) =

English boxer (born 2000)

Personal information
- Nationality: English
- Born: 17 September 2000 (age 26)
- Height: 5 ft 8 in (173 cm)
- Weight: Welterweight

Boxing career
- Stance: Orthodox

Boxing record
- Total fights: 14
- Wins: 12
- Win by KO: 4
- Losses: 2

Owen Cooper (born 17 September 2000) is an English professional boxer. He is a former English and WBO European welterweight champion.

== Career ==
A professional since 2019, Cooper signed a promotional contract with Frank Warren's Queensbury Promotions two years later.

Unbeaten in his first six pro-fights, he dethroned Midlands Area welterweight champion Jamie Stewart on points at the International Centre in Telford on 19 November 2022.

Cooper faced WBO European welterweight champion Eithan James at Resorts World Arena in Birmingham on 16 March 2024, with the vacant English welterweight title also on the line. He knocked his opponent to the canvas in the first round and won when James retired at the end of round nine.

He lost his WBO European title in his first defense when he was stopped in the final round by Ekow Essuman at Manchester Arena on 20 July 2024. Although his English championship was not up for grabs, the defeat also saw that title made vacant due to British Boxing Board of Control rules regarding losses to other English fighters in non-title bouts.

Cooper returned to winning ways in his next outing, defeating Chris Kongo on points in a 10-round contest at Nottingham Arena on 10 May 2025.

He challenged Commonwealth welterweight champion Constantin Ursu in Derby on 28 February 2026, with the vacant British welterweight title also on the line. He lost via unanimous decision.

== Professional boxing record ==
14 fights	12 wins	2 losses
By knockout	4	1
By decision	8	1

No.	Result	Record	Opponent	Type	Round, time	Date	Location	Notes
14	Win	12–2	Octavian Gratii	PTS	6	25 Jul 2026	Aldersley Leisure Village, Wolverhampton, England	
13	Loss	11–2	Constantin Ursu	UD	12	28 Feb 2026	Vaillant Live, Derby, England	For Commonwealth welterweight title; For vacant British welterweight title
12	Win	11–1	Chris Kongo	PTS	10	10 May 2025	Nottingham Arena, Nottingham, England	
11	Loss	10–1	Ekow Essuman	TKO	10 (10), 0:23	20 Jul 2024	bp pulse LIVE, Birmingham, England	Lost WBO European welterweight title
10	Win	10–0	Eithan James	RTD	9 (10), 3:00	16 Mar 2024	bp pulse LIVE, Birmingham, England	Won WBO European and vacant English welterweight titles
9	Win	9–0	Robin Zamora	PTS	8	29 Jul 2023	Telford International Centre, Telford, England	
8	Win	8–0	Eber Tobar	TKO	2 (8), 2:01	25 Mar 2023	Telford International Centre, Telford, England	
7	Win	7–0	Jamie Stewart	PTS	10	19 Nov 2022	Telford International Centre, Telford, England	Won Midlands Area welterweight title
6	Win	6–0	Richard Helm	PTS	6	16 Apr 2022	Telford International Centre, Telford, England	
5	Win	5–0	Des Newton	TKO	5 (6), 0:45	9 Oct 2021	Utilita Arena, Birmingham, England	
4	Win	4–0	Daryl Pearce	TKO	1 (4), 1:52	24 Apr 2021	York Hall, Bethnal Green, London, England	
3	Win	3–0	MJ Hall	PTS	4	13 Sep 2020	Hangar 34, Liverpool, England	
2	Win	2–0	Fonz Alexander	PTS	4	07 Dec 2019	Bescot Stadium, Walsall, England	
1	Win	1–0	Paul Cummings	PTS	4	28 Sep 2019	Town Hall, Walsall, England	
