= Thulani Mbenge =

South African boxer

Personal information
- Nationality: South African
- Born: 15 July 1991 (age 35) Mdantsane, South Africa
- Height: 5 ft 11 1/2 in (182 cm)
- Weight: Welterweight

Boxing career
- Stance: Orthodox

Boxing record
- Total fights: 23
- Wins: 21
- Win by KO: 15
- Losses: 2
Medal record
Men's amateur boxing
Representing South Africa
Commonwealth Games
Bronze medal – third place	2014 Glasgow	Welterweight

Thulani Mbenge (born 15 July 1991) is a South African professional boxer. He is the current IBO welterweight champion. As an amateur, he won a bronze medal at the 2014 Commonwealth Games.

== Amateur career ==
Mbenge was an outstanding amateur before joining the professional ranks, winning the South African junior welterweight championships in 2010 and 2011, and a bronze medal at the 2014 Commonwealth Games in Glasgow, Scotland.

== Professional career ==
As a professional Mbenge has won South African, WBC, IBO and African Boxing Union titles.

== Professional boxing record ==
23 fights	21 wins	2 losses
By knockout	15	0
By decision	6	2

No.	Result	Record	Opponent	Type	Round, time	Date	Location	Notes
23	Win	21-2	(United Kingdom) Michael McKinson	UD	12	19 Oct 2024	(United Kingdom) Copper Box Arena, London, England	Won the vacant IBO welterweight title
22	Win	20-2	(Argentina) Leandro Ariel Fonseca	UD	10	2 Mar 2024	Olive Convention Centre, Durban, South Africa	
21	Loss	19-2	(France) Souleymane Cissokho	UD	12	17 Dec 2022	Parc des expositions, Nantes, France	For Vacant WBC Silver Welterweight Title
20	Win	19-1	(Tanzania) Idd Pialari	TKO	2(10) 1:54	30 Jun 2022	The Gallery, Sandton, Johannesburg, South Africa	
19	Win	18-1	(South Africa) Jabulani Makhense	TKO	3 (12) 2:43	19 Jun 2021	Emperors Palace, Kempton Park, South Africa	Won WBA Pan African Welterweight Title
18	Win	17-1	(South Africa) Mziwoxolo Ndwayana	KO	4 (12) 2:01	18 Dec 2020	Memorial Centre, Kagiso, South Africa	Won South Africa Welterweight Title
17	Win	16-1	(Democratic Republic of the Congo) Mardochee Kuvesa Katembo	UD	10	17 Oct 2020	Klipspruit Sport Centre, Soweto, South Africa	Won Vacant African Boxing Union Welterweight Title
16	Loss	15-1	(Germany) Sebastian Formella	UD	12	6 Jul 2019	CU Arena Neugraben, Hamburg, Germany	Lost IBO World Welterweight Title
15	Win	15-0	(Mexico) Miguel Vazquez	RTD	9 (12)	8 Dec 2018	Emperors Palace, Kempton Park, South Africa	Defended IBO Welterweight Title
14	Win	14-0	(Argentina) Diego Gabriel Chaves	TKO	7 (12) 0:36	23 Jun 2018	Emperors Palace, Kempton Park, South Africa	Won IBO welterweight title
13	Win	13-0	(Mexico) Diego Cruz	UD	12	3 Mar 2018	Emperors Palace, Kempton Park, South Africa	Won Vacant WBC International Welterweight Title
12	Win	12-0	(South Africa) Mziwoxolo Ndwayana	UD	12	9 Sep 2017	Emperors Palace, Kempton Park, South Africa	Defended South Africa Welterweight Title
11	Win	11-0	(Philippines) Jay Ar Inson	UD	8	10 Jun 2017	Emperors Palace, Kempton Park, South Africa	
10	Win	10-0	(South Africa) Shaun Ness	TKO	7 (12)	23 Apr 2017	Emperors Palace, Kempton Park, South Africa	Won South Africa Welterweight Title
9	Win	9-0	(South Africa) Ntuthuko Memela	TKO	3 (8)	4 Feb 2017	Emperors Palace, Kempton Park, South Africa	
8	Win	8-0	(Democratic Republic of the Congo) Eric Kapia Mukadi	TKO	4 (10)	1 Dec 2016	Emperors Palace, Kempton Park, South Africa	
7	Win	7-0	(South Africa) Zenzile Ntanzi	TKO	1 (6)	24 Jul 2016	Emperors Palace, Kempton Park, South Africa	
6	Win	6–0	(Angola) Maiala Antonio	TKO	1 (6)	23 Apr 2016	Mdantsane Indoor Centre, Mdantsane, South Africa	
5	Win	5–0	(South Africa) Andile Mabilisa	KO	1 (4)	7 Feb 2017	Emperors Palace, Kempton Park, South Africa	
4	Win	4–0	(South Africa) Xolani Mgidi	TKO	1 (4)	14 Oct 2015	Barnyard Theatre, Rivonia, Johannesburg, South Africa	
3	Win	3–0	(South Africa) Thabo Mnguni	TKO	2 (4)	4 Oct 2015	Emperors Palace, Kempton Park, South Africa	
2	Win	2–0	(South Africa) Vusi Bilankulu	TKO	1 (4)	29 Jul 2015	Presley's Nightclub, Pretoria, South Africa	
1	Win	1–0	(South Africa) Makhosonke Abrahams	KO	1 (4)	16 May 2015	International Convention Centre, Durban, South Africa	
