= Constantin Ursu =

Moldovan-British boxer (born 2000)

Personal information
- Nickname: The Moldovan Monster
- Nationality: British
- Born: 8 March 2000 (age 26) Chișinău, Moldova
- Height: 5 ft 11 in (180 cm)
- Weight: Welterweight

Boxing career
- Stance: Southpaw

Boxing record
- Total fights: 16
- Wins: 16
- Win by KO: 7
Medal record
Boxing
Representing Moldova
European Junior Boxing Championships
Silver medal – second place	2015 Hungary	57kg
European Youth Boxing Championships
Bronze medal – third place	2018 Italy	64kg

Constantin Ursu (born 8 March 2000) is a Moldovan-British professional boxer. Based in Devon, he has held the Commonwealth welterweight title since March 2025 and the British welterweight title since February 2026. Ursu is also a former WBO European welterweight champion.

== Career ==
As an amateur Ursu represented Moldova at international competitions, winning a silver medal at the 2015 European Junior Boxing Championships and bronze at the 2018 European Youth Boxing Championships.

He moved to Plymouth in Devon, England, in 2019 and, having turned professional, won the vacant Southern Area welterweight title at the city's Guildhall by stopping Matthew King in the third round on 1 April 2023.

Unbeaten in his first 11 pro-fights, Ursu faced Lewis Booth at the Brentwood Centre in Essex on 7 December 2024, in a final eliminator for a shot at the British and Commonwealth welterweight titles. He won via second round stoppage.

Ursu claimed the vacant Commonwealth title with a seventh round stoppage of Eithan James at York Hall in London on 30 March 2025.

He returned to York Hall to make the first defense of his championship against Ryan Amos on 30 November 2025, with the vacant WBO European welterweight title also on the line. Ursu won by unanimous decision.

Ursu defended his title for a second time against Owen Cooper in Derby on 28 February 2026, with the vacant British welterweight title also at stake. He won via unanimous decision.

He defended his British and Commonwealth titles against Ben Vaughan at The O2 Arena in London on 29 August 2026. Ursu won by technical knockout when the referee stopped the contest on the advice of the ringside doctor at the start of the eighth round, due to a severe cut over his opponent's right eye.

== Professional boxing record ==
16 fights	16 wins	0 losses
By knockout	7	0
By decision	9	0

No.	Result	Record	Opponent	Type	Round, time	Date	Location	Notes
16	Win	16–0	Ben Vaughan	TKO	8 (12), 0:03	29 Aug 2026	The O2 Arena, London, England	Retained British and Commonwealth welterweight titles
15	Win	15–0	Owen Cooper	UD	12	28 Feb 2026	Vaillant Live, Derby, England	Retained Commonwealth welterweight title; Won vacant British welterweight title
14	Win	14–0	Ryan Amos	UD	12	30 Nov 2025	York Hall, Bethnal Green, London, England	Retained Commonwealth welterweight title; Won vacant WBO European welterweight title
13	Win	13–0	Eithan James	KO	7 (12), 0:43	30 Mar 2025	York Hall, Bethnal Green, London, England	Won vacant Commonwealth welterweight title
12	Win	12–0	Lewis Booth	TKO	2 (12), 0:57	7 Dec 2024	Brentwood Centre, Brentwood, Essex, England	
11	Win	11–0	Octavian Gratii	PTS	6	7 Sep 2024	Brentwood Centre, Brentwood, Essex, England	
10	Win	10–0	Basi Razaq	KO	3 (10), 0:48	27 Apr 2024	Brentwood Centre, Brentwood, Essex, England	
9	Win	9–0	Jordan Dujon	RTD	8 (10), 3:00	9 Dec 2023	Brentwood Centre, Brentwood, Essex, England	Won vacant Commonwealth Silver welterweight title
8	Win	8–0	Matthew King	TKO	3 (10), 2:59	1 Apr 2023	Guild Hall, Plymouth, England	Won vacant British Southern Area welterweight title
7	Win	7–0	Fonz Alexander	PTS	6	26 Nov 2022	MECA, Regent Circus, Swindon, England	
6	Win	6–0	Josh Cook	PTS	6	29 Oct 2022	Guild Hall, Plymouth, England	
5	Win	5–0	Borja Lopez	PTS	4	13 May 2022	Indigo at the O2, Greenwich, London, England	
4	Win	4–0	Josh Hodgins	TKO	1 (4), 1:26	9 Apr 2022	York Hall, Bethnal Green, London, England	
3	Win	3–0	Fernando Valencia	PTS	4	16 Oct 2021	Guild Hall, Plymouth, England	
2	Win	2–0	Teodor Nikolov	PTS	4	07 Mar 2020	York Hall, Bethnal Green, London, England	
1	Win	1–0	Artur Davydenko	PTS	4	22 Nov 2019	Guild Hall, Plymouth, England	
