= Junaid Bostan =

British boxer (born 2002)

Personal information
- Nickname: Star Boy
- Nationality: British
- Born: 21 February 2002 (age 24) Rotherham, South Yorkshire, United Kingdom
- Height: 6 ft 2 in (187 cm)

Boxing career
- Stance: Southpaw

Boxing record
- Total fights: 13
- Wins: 11
- Win by KO: 8
- Losses: 1
- Draws: 1
- No contests: 0

Junaid Bostan (born 21 February 2002) is a British professional boxer from Rotherham, Yorkshire. Competing in the super-welterweight division, he is known for his southpaw stance and impressive knockout power.

== Early life and amateur career ==
Bostan was born in England to a Pakistani father and English mother. He began boxing at a young age, training under the late Brendan Ingle before joining the Steel City Gym in Sheffield under the guidance of Grant Smith. He is a double national champion and represented England internationally from the age of 13. During his amateur career, he achieved significant milestones, including winning national titles and competing in international tournaments. Notably, he faced opponents such as George Liddard in the England Boxing National Youth Championships 2020 Finals.

== Professional career ==
Bostan turned professional in 2022, signing a multi-fight promotional deal with Eddie Hearn's Matchroom Boxing.

Bostan made his American debut on 15 December 2023 against Gordie Russ II, nephew of renowned boxing trainer SugarHill Steward, and won via unanimous decision despite facing some adversity.

Bostan next faced Jack Martin on 27 April 2024, ending the fight with a left uppercut at the start of the eugth round.

Bostan took on Argentine boxer Maico Sommariva at the Co-op Live Arena in Manchester on 27 October 2024. He secured a victory with a precise uppercut to Sommariva's body in the third round, marking his 10th consecutive win.

Bostan faced Bilal Fawaz for the vacant BBBofC English super-welterweight title at Indigo at The O2 in London on 31 January 2025. The fight resulted in a split draw.

A rematch took place at Sheffield Arena on 11 October 2025, with Fawaz winning by majority decision to take the title and end Bostan's unbeaten record.

== Professional boxing record ==
13 fights	11 wins	1 loss
By knockout	8	0
By decision	3	1
Draws	1	

No.	Result	Record	Opponent	Type	Round, Time	Date	Location	Notes
13	Win	11–1–1	Mohammed Graich	PTS	8	2 May 2026	University of Wolverhampton at The Halls, Wolverhampton, England	
12	Loss	10–1–1	Bilal Fawaz	MD	10	11 Oct 2025	Sheffield Arena, Sheffield, England	For vacant English super-welterweight title
11	Draw	10–0–1	Bilal Fawaz	SD	10	31 Jan 2025	Indigo at The O2, London, England	For vacant English super-welterweight title
10	Win	10–0	Maico Sommariva	TKO	3 (8), 1:39	24 Oct 2024	Co-op Live, Manchester, England	
9	Win	9–0	Jack Martin	TKO	8 (10), 0:49	27 Apr 2024	Exhibition Centre Liverpool, Liverpool, England	
8	Win	8–0	Gordie Russ II	UD	8	16 Dec 2023	Desert Diamond Arena, Glendale, Arizona, U.S.	
7	Win	7–0	Corey McCulloch	TKO	6 (8), 2:07	7 Oct 2023	Sheffield Arena, Sheffield, England	
6	Win	6–0	Ryan Amos	PTS	8	1 Jul 2023	Sheffield Arena, Sheffield, England	
5	Win	5–0	Peter Kramer	TKO	7 (8), 1:30	18 Feb 2023	Nottingham Arena, Nottingham, England	
4	Win	4–0	Athanasios Glynos	TKO	5 (6), 0:46	10 Dec 2022	First Direct Arena, Leeds, England	
3	Win	3–0	Anas Isarti	TKO	6 (6), 2:38	24 Sep 2022	Nottingham Arena, Nottingham, England	
2	Win	2–0	Jose Manuel Lopez Clavero	TKO	6 (6), 1:33	6 Aug 2022	Sheffield Arena, Sheffield, England	
1	Win	1–0	Alexis Wernet	TKO	2 (4), 1:17	11 Mar 2022	Magna Centre, Rotherham, England	
