= Tyson Fury vs. Dillian Whyte =

Boxing match

- Date: 23 April 2022
- Venue: Wembley Stadium, London, England
- Title(s) on the line: WBC, TBRB and The Ring heavyweight titles

Tale of the tape
Boxer	Tyson Fury	Dillian Whyte
Nickname	The Gypsy King	The Body Snatcher
Hometown	Manchester, England	London, England
Purse	$33,640,500	$7,384,500
Pre-fight record	31–0–1 (22 KO)	28–2 (19 KO)
Age	33 years, 8 months	34 years
Height	6 ft 9 in (206 cm)	6 ft 4 in (193 cm)
Weight	265 1/2 lb (120 kg)	253 1/4 lb (115 kg)
Style	Orthodox (Note: Listed by BoxRec as orthodox, but regularly switch hits as a southpaw.)	Orthodox
Recognition	WBC, TBRB and The Ring; Heavyweight Champion	WBC; Interim Heavyweight Champion; TBRB; No. 3 Ranked Heavyweight; The Ring; No. 4 Ranked Heavyweight

Result
- Fury wins via 6th-round technical knockout

Tyson Fury vs. Dillian Whyte was a professional boxing event that featured heavyweight professional boxing match contested between WBC and The Ring heavyweight champion, Tyson Fury, and WBC interim heavyweight champion, Dillian Whyte. The bout took place on Saturday 23 April 2022 at Wembley Stadium in London, England.

== Background ==
On 9 October 2021, undefeated WBC and The Ring heavyweight champion Tyson Fury defended his world titles against former WBC champion Deontay Wilder in their trilogy match, when he defeated Wilder via eleventh-round knockout in a widely acclaimed contest that was named The Ring magazine Fight of the Year 2021. Fury's mandatory challenger, Dillian Whyte, had been scheduled to face southpaw Otto Wallin in a defence of his WBC interim title later that month on 30 October, but the fight was cancelled days beforehand after it was alleged that Whyte had suffered a shoulder injury, ruling him out of contention. Whyte ultimately did not reschedule the fight, opting to bypass Wallin for a shot at Fury's world titles.

On 30 December 2021, WBC president Mauricio Sulaiman, who had ordered Fury to defend his WBC title against Whyte, ruled that the champion Fury would be entitled to 80% of the purse, compared to Whyte's 20% as the challenger. Sulaiman had set a deadline of 11 January 2022 for purse bids, as the two fighters' camps could not agree to terms. However, this deadline was pushed back multiple times, in part due to ongoing negotiations from Fury's team who were trying to secure the fight for the undisputed heavyweight championship against undefeated WBA (Super), IBF and WBO heavyweight champion Oleksandr Usyk. A fight between Fury and Usyk did not materialise, as deposed former champion Anthony Joshua was unwilling to step aside to allow the two champions to fight.

The deadline for the Fury-Whyte purse bids was ultimately scheduled for 28 January 2022, when it was announced that Frank Warren's Queensberry Promotions had won the rights to promote the fight, with a winning bid of $41,025,000 (£31 million), beating out the $32,222,222 (£24 million) bid submitted by Eddie Hearn's Matchroom. Warren's bid was reported to be the highest successful purse bid in boxing history. Fury reacted to the news, stating on social media that he is "coming home", suggesting that the fight against Whyte will be the first time he will box on U.K. soil since his August 2018 win against Francesco Pianeta. On 25 February 2022, it was officially announced that the fight would be taking place at Wembley Stadium in London, England on 23 April.

The first press conference for the fight took place on 1 March at Wembley Stadium, with Whyte absent. Whyte's lawyer stated that his client would not be partaking in promoting the fight, as "we still do not have things resolved". Despite his opponent's non-attendance, Fury as usual was "in full showman mode", declaring, "Even Tyson Fury versus his own shadow sells", and promising that the fight "is going to be a Ferrari racing a Vauxhall Corsa". When asked about Whyte's no-show, Fury opined, "He's definitely shown the white flag in my estimation." In addition, he stated that his bout against Whyte would be the final fight of his professional career, promising to retire after the fight: "I'm a two-time undisputed world champion. [I have] £150m in the bank and nothing to prove to anybody."

Tickets for the fight went on sale on 2 March. 85,000 of the 90,000 available tickets were sold within the first 3 hours, prompting Fury's promoter Frank Warren to begin the process of applying to the local authorities to expand the capacity to 100,000 fans, which would make Fury-Whyte the largest post-war boxing attendance in the history of the United Kingdom. The contest ultimately took place in front of a record-breaking crowd of 94,000 fans: 4,000 more than the attendance of Anthony Joshua vs. Wladimir Klitschko which also took place at Wembley Stadium in 2017, thus setting a new attendance record for a boxing match in Europe.

== The fight ==
Whyte boxed the first round in the southpaw stance, which was unusual for the primarily orthodox fighter. At the start of the second round Fury switched between the southpaw and orthodox stances. The champion found success with the jab and check hook. In the fourth round, Whyte was cut over his right eye after a clash of heads. Fury continued to dominate the fight, landing a straight right in the fifth round which appeared to momentarily stun the challenger. With around ten seconds left of the sixth round, Fury landed a left jab, followed by a right uppercut which sent Whyte sprawling to the canvas. Although Whyte was able to beat the count and rise to his feet, the referee deemed it unsafe for him to continue, halting the fight after two minutes and fifty-nine seconds of the sixth round, declaring Fury the winner by sixth-round technical knockout. At the time of the stoppage, Whyte was behind on the judges' scorecards with 49–46, 48–47, and 50–45.

== Aftermath ==
Fury announced his retirement on 12 August 2022 and relinquished both The Ring and TBRB titles. This lasted until 20 October 2022, when it was announced that Fury would return to defend his WBC title against Derek Chisora in a trilogy bout on 3 December at Tottenham Hotspur Stadium.

== Fight card ==
Confirmed bouts:

Weight Class		vs.		Method	Round	Time	Notes
Heavyweight	(United Kingdom) Tyson Fury (c)	def.	(United Kingdom) Dillian Whyte (ic)	TKO	6 (12)	2:59	^{Note 1}
Welterweight	(United Kingdom) Ekow Essuman (c)	def.	(United Kingdom) Darren Tetley	UD	12		Replacement^{Note 2}
Featherweight	(United Kingdom) Nick Ball	def.	(United Kingdom) Isaac Lowe	TKO	6 (10)	1:45	^{Note 3}
Heavyweight	(United Kingdom) David Adeleye	def.	(United Kingdom) Chris Healey	TKO	4 (8)	0:52
Light Heavyweight	(United Kingdom) Tommy Fury	def.	(Poland) Daniel Bocianski	PTS	6
Preliminary bouts
Light Heavyweight	(United Kingdom) Karol Itauma	def.	(Poland) Michal Ciach	TKO	2 (4)	2:27
Super Featherweight	(United Kingdom) Royston Barney-Smith	def.	(Romania) Konstantin Radoi	PTS	4
Non-TV bouts
Super Featherweight	(Republic of Ireland) Kurt Walker	def.	(Romania) Stefan Nicolae	PTS	4

^Note 1 For WBC, TBRB and The Ring heavyweight titles
^Note 2 For BBBofC British, CBC Commonwealth, and IBF European welterweight titles
^Note 3 For vacant WBC Silver Featherweight title

== Broadcasting ==
Country/Region	Free-to-air	Cable/Satellite	Pay-per-view	Stream
United Kingdom (Host)	—N/a		BT Sport Box Office	
Ireland	—N/a		BT Sport Box Office	
United States	—N/a		ESPN PPV	ESPN+
Canada	—N/a		Rogers Ignite TV	—N/a
Japan	—N/a	Wowow	—N/a	Wowow
Kazakhstan	Qazsport	—N/a	—N/a	—N/a
Australia	—N/a		Stan Event PPV	
New Zealand	—N/a		Sky Arena PPV	
Belgium	—N/a	VOO Sports World Chaîne 30	—N/a	VOO Sports World
Bulgaria	—N/a	Max Sport 2	—N/a	
Croatia	—N/a	Arena Sport 2	—N/a	Arena Sport 2
France	—N/a	RMC Sport	—N/a	—N/a
Slovakia	—N/a	Dajto	—N/a	Voyo
Spain	—N/a	—N/a	—N/a	Eurosport Player
Sweden	—N/a		Viaplay PPV	
Finland	—N/a		Viaplay PPV	
Norway	—N/a		Viaplay PPV	
Denmark	—N/a		Viaplay PPV	
Netherlands	—N/a		Viaplay PPV	
Poland	—N/a		Viaplay PPV	
Germany	Bild TV	—N/a		Bild+
Greece	—N/a	Cosmote Sport 8	—N/a	Cosmote Sport 8
Ukraine	—N/a	Setanta Sports	—N/a	MEGOGO
Indonesia	O Channel	Champions TV	—N/a	Vidio
Italy	—N/a			Mola
Kosovo	—N/a	RTK	—N/a	
Portugal	—N/a	Sport TV 6	—N/a	
Romania				Voyo
Turkey	—N/a			S Sport +
South Africa	—N/a	SuperSport Grandstand; SS Action; SS Maximo	—N/a	SuperSport Grandstand; SS Action; SS Maximo
Nigeria	—N/a	SuperSport Grandstand; SS Action; SS Maximo	—N/a	SuperSport Grandstand; SS Action; SS Maximo
ROA (Anglophone Africa)	—N/a	SuperSport Grandstand; SS Action; SS Maximo	—N/a	SuperSport Grandstand; SS Action; SS Maximo
ROA (Lusophone Africa)	—N/a	SuperSport Grandstand; SS Action; SS Maximo	—N/a	SuperSport Grandstand; SS Action; SS Maximo
Latin America	—N/a	ESPN Knockout	—N/a	

== Notes ==
Preceded by vs. Deontay Wilder III	Tyson Fury' bouts 23 April 2022	Succeeded by vs. Derek Chisora III
Preceded by vs. Alexander Povetkin II	Dillian Whyte's bouts 23 April 2022	Succeeded by vs. Jermaine Franklin
