= Alexander Povetkin vs. Dillian Whyte II =

Boxing competition

Rumble On The Rock
- Date: 27 March 2021
- Venue: Europa Point Sports Complex, Gibraltar
- Title on the line: WBC interim heavyweight title

Tale of the tape
Boxer	(Russia) Alexander Povetkin	(United Kingdom) Dillian Whyte
Nickname	"Sasha"	"The Body Snatcher"
Hometown	Chekhov, Moscow Oblast, Russia	Brixton, London, England
Pre-fight record	36–2–1 (24 KOs)	27–2 (18 KOs)
Age	41 years, 6 months	32 years, 11 months
Height	6 ft 2 in (188 cm)	6 ft 4 in (193 cm)
Weight	228 lb (103 kg)	247 lb (112 kg)
Style	Orthodox	Orthodox
Recognition	WBC; Interim Heavyweight Champion; The Ring; No. 3 Ranked Heavyweight; TBRB; No. 4 Ranked Heavyweight	WBC; No. 6 Ranked heavyweight The Ring; No. 4 Ranked Heavyweight; TBRB; No. 7 Ranked Heavyweight

Result
- Whyte wins via 4th-round TKO

Alexander Povetkin vs. Dillian Whyte II, billed as Rumble On The Rock, was a heavyweight professional boxing rematch contested between the former WBA (Regular) titleholder and defending WBC interim champion Alexander Povetkin, and former WBC interim champion Dillian Whyte.

== Background ==
An immediate rematch with Alexander Povetkin was scheduled for 21 November 2020, but was pushed back when Povetkin tested positive for COVID-19. Whyte believed he would beat Povetkin nine times out of ten, hence taking the rematch immediately. Also, prior to the stoppage, he had knocked down Povetkin multiple times. It was reported on 1 December, that Povetkin had recovered and would begin training. A new date of 30 January 2021 was being explored for the rematch. Two weeks later, Povetkin's promoter Andrey Ryabinsky told reporters that Povetkin was still in fact recovering and was not able to complete in January. He later stated that Povetkin had been re-hospitalised. Whyte played down talks of Povetkin having COVID and suggested Povetkin just needed more time to get ready for the rematch.

On 15 January, Hearn announced a PPV card on 6 March with Povetkin vs. Whyte for the interim WBC heavyweight title on the line as the headline. A full undercard was also announced, but no mention of a location. Whyte told Hearn he wanted to fight in front of a crowd. Gibraltar, Monaco and the Middle East became possible locations for the event. Whyte added former co-trainer of Lennox Lewis, Harold 'The Shadow' Knight to his training team alongside Xavier Miller and later moved his training came from Portugal to Spain. One of the reasons for this was due to the UK government adding Portugal to the red list due to high COVID transmission rates. On 20 February, a new date of 27 March was announced, this was due to travel restrictions and the venue was confirmed to be Europe Point Sports Complex in Gibraltar. The fight was billed as "Rumble on the Rock!", linking it to the Rock of Gibraltar. Povetkin said he was going into the rematch focusing on winning and not necessarily by stoppage. He did more work on defence. VADA officials told Boxing Scene that testing had been place from when the rematch was first announced, despite the fight date push backs. Povetkin had been tested regularly since his cancelled fight with Deontay Wilder in 2016 and Whyte had also been tested more recently. For the weigh in, compared to the first meeting, Whyte came in lighter at 247¼ pounds and Povetkin came in slightly heavier at 228¼ pounds.

== The fight ==
Whyte won via technical knockout in the fourth round. The win meant that Whyte regained the WBC interim heavyweight title. The fight was one-sided from the opening bell with Whyte hurting Povetkin with multiple clean shots which put Povetkin on unsteady legs. Whyte landed two right hands to the head of Povetkin followed by a left hook to the head which dropped him. Povetkin got up to beat the referees count but his corner threw the towel in, ending the fight. The time of stoppage was 2:39 of round 4. Povetkin only landed 8 punches of 72 thrown (11.1%) and Whyte threw 131 punches, landing 57 of them (43.5%), 30 of which were power punches. Many pundits and boxing experts believed Povetkin didn't recover fully from the effects of COVID.

== Aftermath ==
The fight would ultimately be the last of Povetkin's career, as he announced his retirement soon afterwards aged 41 on 13 June 2021.

== Fight card ==
Weight Class		vs.		Method	Round	Time	Notes
Heavyweight	(United Kingdom) Dillian Whyte	def.	(Russia) Alexander Povetkin (c)	TKO	4/12	2:39	^{Note 1}
Heavyweight	(United Kingdom) Fabio Wardley	def.	(United States) Éric Molina	KO	5/10
Super-welterweight	(United Kingdom) Ted Cheeseman	def.	(United Kingdom) James Metcalf	TKO	11/12	3:10	^{Note 2}
Lightweight	(United Kingdom) Campbell Hatton	def.	(Spain) Jesus Ruiz	PTS	4		^{Note 3}
Welterweight	(United Kingdom) Michael McKinson	def.	(United Kingdom) Chris Kongo (c)	UD	10		^{Note 4}
Heavyweight	(United Kingdom) Nick Webb	def.	(Germany) Erik Pfeifer	TKO	2/10	1:51	^{Note 5}

^Note 1 For WBC interim heavyweight title
^Note 2 For vacant British super-welterweight title
^Note 3 Professional debut for Hatton
^Note 4 For WBO Global welterweight title
^Note 5 For vacant IBO International heavyweight title

== Broadcasting ==
The Undercard will be televised for a 30-minute Freeview on Sky Sports Arena, Sky Sports Mix and Sky Sports Boxing YouTube The fight will be televised live on Sky Sports Box Office PPV in the United Kingdom and Ireland, as well as REN TV in Russia.

Country	Broadcaster			
Country	Free-to-air	Cable/Pay TV	PPV	Stream
United Kingdom	Sky Sports Arena, Sky Sports Mix and Sky Sports Boxing YouTube for 30 Minutes Freeview		Sky Sports Box Office	
Ireland	Sky Sports Arena, Sky Sports Mix and Sky Sports Boxing YouTube for 30 Minutes Freeview		Sky Sports Box Office	
Russia	REN TV	A1	—N/a	Amediateka
Worldwide	—N/a			DAZN^{INT}

^INT- the coverage is not available in UK, IRL, and selected countries.

Preceded by First fight	Alexander Povetkin's bouts 27 March 2021	Retired
Preceded by First fight	Dillian Whyte's bouts 27 March 2021	Succeeded by vs. Tyson Fury
