= Sebastian Formella =

German boxer

Personal information
- Born: 26 May 1987 (age 39) Lauenburg, Schleswig-Holstein, West Germany
- Height: 1.77 m (5 ft 10 in)
- Weight: Welterweight; Light-middleweight; Middleweight

Boxing career
- Reach: 177 cm (70 in)
- Stance: Orthodox

Boxing record
- Total fights: 29
- Wins: 26
- Win by KO: 14
- Losses: 3

Sebastian Formella (born 26 May 1987) is a German professional boxer who held the IBO welterweight title from 2019 to 2020.

== Professional career ==
Formella made his professional debut on 3 May 2014, scoring a second-round technical knockout (TKO) victory over Pavel Herman at the Müggelspreehalle in Grünheide, Germany

After compiling a record of 20–0 (10 KOs) he defeated Thulani Mbenge on 6 July 2019 at the CU Arena in Hamburg, Germany, capturing the IBO welterweight title via twelve-round unanimous decision (UD), with the scorecards reading 116–112, 115–112 and 114–113.

== Professional boxing record ==
27 fights	24 wins	3 losses
By knockout	12	0
By decision	12	3

No.	Result	Record	Opponent	Type	Round, time	Date	Location	Notes
27	Win	24–3	Florian Wildenhof	KO	7 (8), 0:51	30 Apr 2023	Grosse Freiheit 36, St. Pauli, Germany	
26	Loss	23–3	Chris Kongo	UD	10	11 Jun 2022	The SSE Arena, London, England	
25	Win	23–2	Gabor Kovacs	TKO	4 (10), 2:09	25 Sep 2021	Fritz-Sdunek-Halle, Zinnowitz, Germany	
24	Loss	22–2	Conor Benn	UD	10	21 Nov 2020	The SSE Arena, London, England	For WBA Continental (Europe) welterweight title
23	Loss	22–1	Shawn Porter	UD	12	22 Aug 2020	Microsoft Theater, Los Angeles, California, US	For vacant WBC Silver welterweight title
22	Win	22–0	Roberto Arriaza	UD	12	18 Jan 2020	Edel-optics.de Arena, Hamburg, Germany	Retained IBO welterweight title
21	Win	21–0	Thulani Mbenge	UD	12	6 Jul 2019	CU Arena, Hamburg, Germany	Won IBO welterweight title
20	Win	20–0	Bethuel Ushona	UD	12	15 Dec 2018	Alsterdorfer Sporthalle, Hamburg, Germany	Won inaugural WBO Global welterweight title
19	Win	19–0	Ilias Essaoudi	TKO	7 (12), 2:30	29 Sep 2018	Alsterdorfer Sporthalle, Hamburg, Germany	Retained WBO European light-middleweight title
18	Win	18–0	Angelo Frank	TKO	7 (12), 1:37	24 Mar 2018	Edel-optics.de Arena, Hamburg, Germany	Won vacant WBO European and IBO Inter-Continental light-middleweight title
17	Win	17–0	Karlo Tabaghua	UD	8	22 Dec 2017	Alsterdorfer Sporthalle, Hamburg, Germany	
16	Win	16–0	Jan Balog	UD	6	9 Sep 2017	Max-Schmeling-Halle, Berlin, Germany	
15	Win	15–0	Denis Krieger	UD	10	19 May 2017	Barclaycard Arena, Hamburg, Germany	Won vacant IBO Continental light-middleweight title
14	Win	14–0	Krzysztof Szot	UD	4	18 Mar 2017	Baltiska Hallen, Malmö, Sweden	
13	Win	13–0	Nico Salzmann	UD	8	16 Jul 2016	Max-Schmeling-Halle, Berlin, Germany	
12	Win	12–0	Gyula Vajda	TKO	4 (6), 2:15	7 May 2016	Barclaycard Arena, Hamburg, Germany	
11	Win	11–0	Frane Radnic	UD	6	12 Mar 2016	Jahnsportforum, Neubrandenburg, Germany	
10	Win	10–0	Robizoni Omsarashvili	RTD	5 (8), 3:00	31 Oct 2015	Universum Gym, Hamburg, Germany	Won vacant GBC welterweight title
9	Win	9–0	Mazen Girke	UD	10	20 Jun 2015	Universum Gym, Hamburg, Germany	Won vacant GBC Intercontinental light-middleweight title
8	Win	8–0	Pietro d'Alessio	UD	10	28 Feb 2015	Boxsporthalle Braamkamp, Hamburg, Germany	Won vacant GBC Intercontinental light-middleweight title
7	Win	7–0	Dogan Kurnaz	TKO	2 (4), 1:55	8 Nov 2014	Autohaus Glinicke Hessenkassel, Kassel, Germany	
6	Win	6–0	Cenk Ulug	RTD	4 (10), 3:00	18 Oct 2014	Boxsporthalle Braamkamp, Hamburg, Germany	Won vacant German International middleweight title
5	Win	5–0	Ziso Poulitsa	UD	4	26 Sep 2014	Audi-Centrum, Berlin, Germany	
4	Win	4–0	Aleksandar Jankovic	TKO	3 (4), 1:15	28 Jun 2014	Mehrzweckhalle am Ploggensee, Grevesmühlen, Germany	
3	Win	3–0	Jozsef Kormany	KO	6 (6), 1:40	16 May 2014	CU Arena, Hamburg, Germany	
2	Win	2–0	Alichan Tersbulatov	RTD	3 (4), 3:00	10 May 2014	Pneumant Arena, Fürstenwalde, Germany	
1	Win	1–0	Pavel Herman	TKO	2 (4), 2:10	3 May 2014	Müggelspreehalle, Grünheide, Germany	
