= Dillian Whyte =

British boxer (born 1988)

- Born: 11 April 1988 (age 38); Port Antonio, Portland, Jamaica
- Other names: The Villain; The Body Snatcher
- Nationality: British
- Height: 6 ft 4 in (193 cm)
- Division: Heavyweight
- Reach: 78 in (198 cm)
- Stance: Orthodox
- Fighting out of: Brixton, London, England
- Years active: 2008 (MMA); 2011–present (boxing)

Professional boxing record
- Total: 35
- Wins: 31
- By knockout: 21
- Losses: 4

Kickboxing record
- Total: 21
- Wins: 20
- Losses: 1

Mixed martial arts record
- Total: 1
- Wins: 1
- By knockout: 1
- Losses: 0

Other information
- Boxing record from BoxRec
- Mixed martial arts record from Sherdog
- Last updated on: 15 May 2019

Dillian Whyte (/ˈdɪlɪən/; born 11 April 1988) is a Jamaican-British professional boxer who has formerly competed as a kickboxer and mixed martial artist. He held the World Boxing Council (WBC) interim heavyweight title twice between 2019 and 2022. At regional level, he has held multiple heavyweight championships, including the British title from 2016 to 2017; and challenged twice for the Commonwealth title, in 2015 and 2025.

Whyte is also a former kickboxing champion, having held the BIKMA British super-heavyweight title and the European K1 title, and has competed professionally in mixed martial arts.

== Early life ==
Whyte was born in Port Antonio, Portland, Jamaica, on 11 April 1988. Whyte moved with his family to the United Kingdom when he was 12. His paternal grandfather was an Irishman named Patrick Whyte, who emigrated to Jamaica from Dublin, Ireland. Regarding his education, Whyte has spoken of his performance at school in England, while adding: "I had no schooling at all when I lived in Jamaica." As Whyte has mentioned publicly, he had a difficult upbringing in Jamaica, where he was "dodging bullets". Whyte grew up in Brixton, London and fought at Miguel's Boxing Gym. He had spoken of the influence boxing has had upon his early life, by stating: "I didn't do too well at school, to be honest, but boxing saved me and changed my life. And it was going well, because I knew it was my best chance in life."

== Professional kickboxing career ==
Originally, Whyte was a professional kickboxer, to which he became two-time British heavyweight champion by claiming the BIKMA super-heavyweight title, and one-time European K1 champion, while being ranked UK #1 for five years in his weight category of 95 kg+, ending his kickboxing career with a K-1 record of 20–1, before then turning to MMA.

=== Highlights ===
- Defeated Daniel Sam (UK) UD-3
- Lost to Chris Knowles (UK) – Went to a deciding round for Knowles to become the new Pain & Glory UK K1 Champion – UD-4
- Defeated Will Riva (UK) to claim the WPKL British heavyweight title KO-3

== Professional mixed martial arts career ==
Whyte made his professional MMA debut on 6 December 2008, at the Ultimate Challenge MMA, on the James McSweeney vs. Neil Grove undercard, where he defeated Mark Stroud with a right cross only 12 seconds into the round; ultimately winning by knockout (KO) at The Troxy.

== Amateur boxing career ==
In his first amateur bout, in 2009, aged 20, Whyte beat Anthony Joshua by unanimous decision over three rounds. He had stated prior to the fight that his trainer Chris Okoh admitted that the decision to agree to the fight was then considered a risk, albeit ultimately accepting the fight to which Whyte had stated, "But I said I'd take it. Sometimes you've just got to take opportunities when they come."

He left one of his amateur opponents in a coma for several weeks due to a KO.

Whyte had a limited amateur record (6–0–0, 5 KOs) because of a dispute with the ABA regarding his kickboxing background, which led him to turn professional in 2011, although trainer Okoh wanted him to remain amateur. Whyte signed with boxing promoter Frank Maloney, after friends of Maloney witnessed sparring sessions Whyte had with David Haye and former UFC light-heavyweight champion Quinton Jackson.

== Professional boxing career ==
=== Early career ===
Whyte made his professional debut on 13 May 2011. He fought Tayar Mehmed and won via points decision (PTS) in the fourth round, obtaining the decision of 40–36. On 16 September 2011, Whyte made his second professional appearance against his Lithuanian heavyweight journeyman opponent Remigijus Ziausys. Whyte ultimately won by PTS in the fourth round, obtaining the decision of 40–37.

On 3 December 2011 Whyte defeated Croatian Toni Visic, winning by technical knockout (TKO) in the third round due to referee Jeff Hinds stopping the fight at 1 minute 46 seconds.

The next fight for Whyte was against veteran journeyman Hastings Rasani on 21 January 2012 at the Liverpool Olympia in Liverpool. Whyte scored a PTS win based over Rasani, making it his third win on points.

For his fifth professional bout, Whyte defeated Bulgarian Kristian Kirilov by TKO in the first round at The Troxy, Limehouse on 2 March 2012, which was followed by an additional TKO in his sixth bout in the first round on 19 May 2012 against Georgian Zurab Noniashvili at the Aintree Racecourse, Liverpool. Whyte went on to fight Hungarian giant Gabor Farkas at the York Hall in London on 7 July 2012, winning by second-round KO; it marked the first KO victory in Whyte's professional career.

Two months later on 15 September 2012, Whyte challenged former British heavyweight champion Mike Holden to a bout scheduled for six rounds. Holden was put down once in the second and twice in the third round, to which referee Jeff Hinds stopped the fight. Whyte's last fight of 2012 was against Sandor Balogh, which took place in Bluewater, Greenhithe, Kent on the James DeGale undercard when DeGale fought Hadiliah Mohoumadi for the European super-middleweight title on 13 October 2012. Whyte won the bout but was later stripped of the win due to testing positive for banned substances.

=== Drug ban ===
A sample for an in-competition drugs test that Whyte had provided after his victory over Hungary's Sandor Balogh on 13 October was examined and subsequently tested positive for the banned stimulant Methylhexaneamine (MHA). The revelation came while Whyte was en route to a news conference to announce a fight for the English title. The UK Anti-Doping (UKAD) organisation confirmed that Whyte was provisionally suspended from all competition from 5 November 2012. An independent National Anti-Doping Panel (NADP) found that the case warranted a two-year ban. However, Whyte appealed the ban, though the appeal panel retorted by emphasising the confirmed two-year ban; the tribunal had accepted Whyte's claim that he did not knowingly take MHA, but rejected his appeal because he did not do enough to check the supplement's ingredients, as Charles Flint QC, the chairman of the appeal tribunal, explained in his written verdict.

In its first instance decision, the NADP found that Whyte failed to seek professional or medical advice before using the supplement Jack3d, which he had bought over the counter from a nutritional supplement shop. Consequently, they stated that he had "failed to discharge the burden of establishing that he was not significantly at fault" and therefore could not reduce his sanction from two years. The appeal panel agreed with this decision, stressing that the case emphasised "the dangers of athletes taking supplements which contain MHA".

Whyte was thereby banned from all competition with a period of ineligibility from 13 October 2012 to 12 October 2014. The result against Balogh was disqualified by UKAD, but because the British Boxing Board of Control (BBBofC) did not overturn the result, his fight with Balogh is still listed as a victory on boxrec. As Whyte and company exercised the right to appeal under article 13.4.1, they had no further right to appeal under the rules.

=== Return to the ring ===
Whyte was cleared to compete from 12 October 2014, since his two-year ban by UKAD and returned to boxing on 21 November 2014 at the Camden Centre in London to fight Ante Verunica, a fight which lasted all of two rounds as Whyte delivered a hard shot that forced a stoppage from referee Jeff Hinds for a TKO victory. On 28 November, one week after his fight with Verunica, Whyte returned to the Camden Centre and put on another dominating display stopping Tomas Mrazek, with Whyte knocking the durable Mrazek down three times in the third round.

On 20 December 2014, Whyte scored another TKO win, this time over heavyweight hope Kamil Sokolowski in three rounds at the City Hall in Hull.

Whyte followed up his Sokolowski win with a KO victory over Marcelo Nascimento on 7 February 2015 at the Camden Centre to which the Brazilian had never been stopped as quickly in his career.

Whyte's next fight after Nascimento was against undefeated Beka Lobjanidze, which took place on 28 February in the Odyssey Arena in Belfast, on the undercard of The World Is Not Enough Belfast boxing card featuring Carl Frampton's defense against Christopher Avalos for the IBF junior-featherweight title. Whyte scored a fourth-round stoppage over Lobjanidze in a scheduled ten-round bout, as Whyte landed a hard left to the side of the head which sent Lobjanidze to the canvas and he was unable to beat referee Phil Edwards' count at 1 minute 10 seconds of round four, winning by KO.

On 1 August 2015, Whyte faced Irineu Beato Costa Junior, at the KC Lightstream Stadium in Hull, on the undercard of Rumble on the Humber featuring Luke Campbell's clash against Tommy Coyle in a WBC lightweight eliminator. Whyte sent the Brazilian crashing backwards to the canvas, and referee Michael Alexander stopped the fight with 2 minutes 41 seconds remaining in the first round as Whyte put Costa back to the floor with a right hand.

Following his victory over Costa, it was announced that Whyte would face Brian Minto at The O2 Arena for the WBC International Silver heavyweight title on the undercard of Anthony Joshua's title clash with Gary Cornish on 12 September. He defeated Minto by KO in the third round, having already knocked him down once in the first round.

=== British and Commonwealth title challenge ===
==== Whyte vs. Joshua ====
On 14 September 2015, it was announced that Whyte would fight old rival Anthony Joshua for the vacant British heavyweight title on 12 December at The O2 Arena in London on Sky Sports Box Office. Joshua was able to use his power to hurt Whyte in the first round. He appeared hurt again in the second round but was able to catch Joshua with a counterpunch and follow it up, leaving Joshua visibly shaken. Whyte also landed several body shots towards the end of the round. This continued somewhat in the third round with Joshua still looking tired and stiff legged. As the rounds went on, Joshua regained his composure and took control. Whyte took many hard shots before coming back with his own, his chin has since been lauded by critics. Whyte was rocked again in the seventh round from a heavy right hand to the temple. Joshua was able to follow through and landed an uppercut that put Whyte down through the ropes and knocked him out.

=== Return victories ===
Following the loss to Joshua, Whyte spent some time recovering from a shoulder surgery and returned to the boxing ring on Joshua's first world title defence at The O2 Arena on 25 June 2016. Prior to the fight, Whyte signed a deal with Matchroom Sport. Whyte defeated Ivica Bacurin via KO. Whyte started off slow, before working on the jab and knocking Bacurin out with a right hand.

==== Whyte vs. Allen ====
Whyte next fought at the First Direct arena in Leeds on 30 July against David Allen for the vacant WBC International heavyweight title. In what was expected to be a tough fight for Whyte, the fight went the full ten-round distance. Whyte won the fight with a comfortable UD, with the judges scoring the fight 100–90, 100–91, and 99–91.

=== British champion ===
==== Whyte vs. Lewison ====
It was announced on 19 September that Whyte would fight domestic veteran Ian Lewison for the vacant British heavyweight title in Glasgow on the undercard of Ricky Burns vs. Kiryl Relikh on 7 October. Whyte and Lewison had to be separated at the weigh-in press conference. Both fighters promised KOs. Whyte defeated Lewison to claim the vacant title via tenth-round stoppage victory. The fight was stopped in round ten by Lewison's corner. It appeared that he had a nose problem that caused the fight to be halted. Although Lewison looked good from the opening bell, Whyte started taking control from round three onwards. In round ten, Lewison turned his back to start blowing his nose. Whyte missed with a big right hand. From there on, Lewison started boxing defensively before the fight was eventually stopped, declaring Whyte the winner.

==== Whyte vs. Chisora ====
Terms were finally agreed for a fight between Whyte and bitter London rival Derek Chisora (26–6, 18 KOs) to fight in a WBC title eliminator. Whyte and Chisora had been feuding over the year through social media. The fight took place on Sky Box Office in the UK on the undercard off Anthony Joshua vs. Éric Molina for the IBF heavyweight title. The fight was slated to be Whyte's first defence of the British heavyweight title he won against Lewison. However, at the final press conference on 7 December, following Whyte's comment that he'd attack Chisora anytime he sees him after the fight, Chisora picked up the table he was sitting at and threw it towards Whyte, just missing everyone in the way which included the promoters and trainers. As a result, the British Boxing Board of Control withdrew their sanction of the fight and the British title would not be at stake. Whyte's WBC International title was at stake instead. In a contest in which both fighters were hurt, with Chisora and Whyte showing a lot of heart, Whyte won via split decision (SD). Two judges scoring the fight 115–113 and 115–114 for Whyte, and one scoring 115–114 in favour of Chisora. Whyte was hurt a number of times in the fight by Chisora; in the eighth, tenth and twelfth rounds. On two occasions in the twelfth, Whyte was knocked off balance by Chisora after being hit with huge shots to the head. Post fight, Whyte stated he would not give Chisora a rematch but changed his mind later saying he would be open to a rematch.

=== Rise up the ranks ===
In April 2017 it was announced that Whyte would headline a card at The O2 Arena on 3 June 2017. Whyte listed Bryant Jennings, Mariusz Wach, Artur Szpilka and Gerald Washington as potential opponents. On 14 April, Washington put his name forward wanting to get back into the world title mix following his failed attempt to dethrone WBC heavyweight champion Deontay Wilder in February 2017. On 19 April, Matchroom Boxing revealed Whyte's opponent would be 37 year old former world title challenger Mariusz Wach (33–2, 17 KOs). The fight was to take place live on Sky Sports and would also feature younger talents including Reece Bellotti, Ted Cheeseman and Lawrence Okolie. The fight was postponed on 16 May due to Whyte injuring his foot. There was no immediate mention as to when the fight would be rescheduled for.

In early June, promoter Eddie Hearn of Matchroom Boxing confirmed that Whyte would be making his US debut in the Summer of 2017 in order to earn himself a potential world title shot by the end of the year. On 25 July, Hearn announced that Whyte would fight 44 year old former world title challenger Michael Grant (48–7, 36 KOs), who was on a three fight losing streak since 2013. Grant had only fought once since October 2014, which took place in April 2017 in a KO loss to Krzysztof Zimnoch. Grant unsuccessfully challenged then unified heavyweight champion Lennox Lewis in 2000. The fight lasted less than six minutes. The announcement received a lot of criticism and bad press from the media and fans. Two days later, Grant confirmed the fight was cancelled. On 6 August, after struggling to find an opponent, Hearn revealed that Whyte would fight 15-year veteran Malcolm Tann (24–5, 13 KOs) in a scheduled eight-round fight on the undercard of Terence Crawford vs. Julius Indongo. Whyte knocked Tann down four times en route to winning the fight via TKO in round three. Whyte admitted he needed a bigger challenge towards the end of the year before a potential world title fight.

==== Whyte vs. Helenius ====
Eddie Hearn announced that Whyte would fight on the Anthony Joshua vs. Carlos Takam (originally Kubrat Pulev) card on 28 October at the Principality Stadium in Cardiff. Robert Helenius and Lucas Browne were two names mentioned. On 14 September, seven weeks before the fight, Ricky Hatton stated Browne wouldn't take up the fight due to being short notice. Some reported suggested Whyte would fight former two-time European champion Robert Helenius (25–1, 16 KOs). After Luis Ortiz failed a drug test, leaving Deontay Wilder without an opponent, Whyte offered to take his place. The world title fight was ultimately given to mandatory challenger Bermane Stiverne for 4 November. Jarrell Miller was also considered an option before he booked himself a fight with Mariusz Wach in New York. On 4 October Hearn revealed he was interested in getting Dominic Breazeale to fight Whyte, where the winner could potentially fight the winner of the Wilder vs. Stiverne rematch. A couple of days later, Breazeale accepted the challenge. The talks eventually broke down. On 15 October, Hearn announced Whyte vs. Helenius. Whyte failed to impress as he defeated Helenius over twelve rounds via UD. The scorecards read 119–109 twice, and 118–110 all in favour of Whyte. Helenius started the fight well hurting Whyte in the second round. Whyte bounced back and dominated the remainder of the fight with Helenius reluctant to throw anything meaningful to win the rounds. With the win, Whyte claimed the vacant WBC Silver heavyweight title, moving him a step closer to fighting world champion Wilder.

==== Whyte vs. Browne ====
On 11 January 2018, a fight between Whyte and Lucas Browne (25–0, 22 KOs) was finally made, to take place at The O2 Arena in London on 24 March. Whyte's WBC Silver title would be at stake. Speaking of the fight, Whyte said, "I can't wait, I hate Lucas Browne and I want to hurt him. He's said some nasty things and he's going to have to pay for them." Whyte hit Browne with a hard left hook to the head in the round six to knock him unconscious, winning the fight. There was no count made and the fight was waved off immediately with ringside doctors attending to Browne before giving him oxygen. The fight was officially stopped at 37 seconds of the round. Browne's face was cut and badly swollen from the clean shots landed from Whyte. Browne left himself open most of the time and tried switching stances after a few rounds. Browne suffered a cut over his left eye in round three, which got worse with each round. Whyte then bloodied Browne's nose in round five. After the fight, Browne was stretchered from the ring and taken to a nearby hospital for precaution. In the post-fight interview, Whyte called out WBC champion Deontay Wilder for a fight in June 2018. Promoter Eddie Hearn said, "I hope the WBC make Dillian mandatory now, the fight is there for Deontay Wilder in June. We have to force the shot and after that performance, he deserves the shot." Hearn stated there could be a possibility that the WBC order a final eliminator between Whyte and Dominic Breazeale.

==== Whyte vs. Parker ====
On 24 April, the WBC ordered Whyte vs. Luis Ortiz in an eliminator bout for their heavyweight champion, Deontay Wilder. Whyte felt 'betrayed' by this decision from the WBC as he thought he was already in line to challenge Wilder next. The WBC made Dominic Breazeale the mandatory challenger, although they previously confirmed his win over Eric Molina was not a final eliminator. Whyte stated, if anything, the WBC should order Whyte vs. Breazeale as the final eliminator. Promoter Eddie Hearn was also puzzled by the decision. At the same time, the IBF also ordered Whyte to fight former world title challenger Kubrat Pulev (25–1, 13 KO). A purse bid was set for 10 May. New York based promotional company, Epic Sports & Entertainment, made a purse bid of $1,500,111, winning the rights of the fight. Eddie Hearn offered $831,111, which was higher than the $801,305 bid from Team Sauerland. IBF rules state, for a final eliminator, the higher ranked boxer, in this case Pulev, would get 75% ($1,125,083.25) and Whyte would earn $375,027.75 for the fight. On 6 June, although the Whyte vs. Pulev fight was not off the table, it was heavily rumoured via multiple sources that Whyte would instead fight Luis Ortiz in a WBC final eliminator. Many media outlets announced the fight. Pulev was unhappy with the pull out and labelled Whyte and Hearn as "extreme manipulators and plain schizophrenics" as well as accusing them of avoiding him at all costs.

On the morning of 7 June, it was confirmed that Whyte would instead fight former WBO heavyweight champion Joseph Parker (24–1, 18 KOs) on 28 July at The O2 Arena in London on Sky Box Office. An official press conference followed a few hours later. Three days before the fight, it was confirmed a sell-out. It was revealed that before PPV revenue, both boxers would earn just over £1 million for the fight, with Whyte receiving slightly more, being the home fighter. Despite stating he would weigh less, Whyte came in at 258 1/2 pounds, 4 pounds heavier than his previous bout. Parker weighed 242 pounds, 16 pounds lighter than Whyte, however 6 pounds heavier than what he weighed in his loss to Joshua.

Whyte won the bout via UD in a fight which saw both boxers hit the canvas. Whyte knocked Parker down twice in the fight, dropping him in rounds two and nine. It looked as though a short left hook dropped Parker for the first time in his career, however the instant replay showed it was a clash of heads. Referee Ian John Lewis made the count. Most of the middle rounds were mostly back and forth action with both fighters having success. After round six, Whyte began to show fatigue. Whyte also started using roughhouse tactics after the first few rounds. This included rabbit punches, head-butting, holding and hitting and pushing Parker over the ropes. He was warned once earlier in the fight and then warned again in the final rounds, however no points were deducted. Parker took over in the final rounds but was unable to put Whyte away. Parker had an explosive start to round twelve, knowing he needed a knockout to win, he eventually knocked down a fatigued Whyte with 20 seconds left in the fight with a right hand to the head. Whyte got to his feet and survived the remaining seconds of the fight. The three judges scored the fight unanimously 115–110, 114–111, and 113–112 in favour of Whyte. Many of the pundits ringside, which included Steve Bunce, had the fight closer including those on radio, with some even having Parker as the winner. Some portion of the boxing media also scored the fight close, in favour of Parker. The Sky Sports team, which included Matthew Macklin, David Haye, Johnny Nelson and Tony Bellew, were criticized for their views.

Standing together, speaking to Sky Sports after the fight, Whyte gave Parker credit, "He was slick and I knew he was going to fight for the first few rounds, then come back in the final few rounds. I am annoyed I slipped at the final hurdle in the last round. I was rocked and took a few." Whyte stated he would take another fight before the end of 2018 and ready for Anthony Joshua in April 2019, "I would like to fight Joshua again if he wants it. I've still got a lot to learn, so I would like to get one more in before him again." Parker had no complaints and humble in defeat, "I gave it my best; the better man and I will come back stronger." Parker's trainer Kevin Barry was very vocal after the fight regarding Whyte's rough tactics, claiming he should have had points taken off.

On 3 August, it was reported that Duco Events would appeal for the decision to be investigated. The reason for this was because Parker's team believed the head clash in round two, which dropped Parker to the canvas, affected the scorecards as well as Parker's performance during the middle rounds. It is believed that Parker was having success in round two before the head clash, therefore had the knockdown not occurred, the round would have been scored 10–9 in favour of Parker instead 10–8 for Whyte. In a statement, Higgins said, "It's clear that the clash of heads in the second round had a significant impact on the fight. In terms of the scorecards and Joseph's performance in the middle rounds (the headbutt made a big difference). In light of what is clear evidence of a significant error by the officials, there is a legitimate question as to whether the result should stand. That's a question Duco will be asking the sanctioning bodies on Joseph's behalf." Looking at the alternative scorecard, having round two in favour of Parker would have resulted in the bout being scored a split decision draw.

==== Whyte vs. Chisora II ====
In mid-October 2018, Whyte and Luis Ortiz appeared to have a war of words and called each other out, with Ortiz stating he would come to the UK and fight Whyte on 22 December, a potential PPV date allocated to the possible Whyte vs. Chisora rematch. After hearing this, Chisora came out saying 'No one wants to see that [Whyte-Ortiz]', that he was 'the Money Man' and Whyte should fight him if he wants to earn more money. Hearn also stated despite Ortiz putting his name forward, Chisora was the front-runner to fight Whyte. On 17 October, it was reported that Chisora had hired former rival David Haye as his new manager. They also stated that Chisora will no longer go by the name 'Del Boy' and would now be 'WAR'. On 22 October, Whyte told Sky Sports that Chisora needed to sign a deal quick or he would look at other options. On 1 November, the rematch was announced to take place on 22 December at The O2 Arena on Sky Sports Box Office. Chisora was ranked #5 by the WBA and IBF, #7 by the WBC and #11 by the WBO at heavyweight.

Whyte won by KO in the eleventh round, from a powerful left hook. Whyte had luck in the early rounds, catching Chisora, but Chisora continued to work away, and received two warnings for low blows on Whyte, which arguably switched the tempo of the fight. After the win, Whyte called out Anthony Joshua and then stormed off mid-discussion.

=== First reign as WBC interim heavyweight champion ===
==== Whyte vs. Rivas ====
Following his eleventh-round knockout victory over Chisora, Whyte called out unified heavyweight champion Anthony Joshua. Joshua, who was unusually booed by many of those present at the O2 Arena, said: "If Deontay Wilder is serious and he is going to fight Tyson Fury and doesn't want to become undisputed champion, Dillian, you will get a title shot." On 12 January 2019, Whyte revealed that he had turned down a "severe lowball" offer from Joshua to fight him in a rematch. Whyte did not reveal the figure, however, he claimed it was lower than what he received against Chisora in December 2018. Whyte claimed the Joshua fight "was dead" and he was to look at other options, including a potential fight with Dominic Breazeale for the WBC interim title, but Breazeale challenged Deontay Wilder for the world title. WBC-NABF, IBF International, and WBO-NABO champion Óscar Rivas, had enhanced his reputation as a danger man following his brutal KO of the former world title challenger Bryant Jennings in January.

On the 20 July 2019, Whyte and Rivas fought for the vacant WBC interim heavyweight title. Rivas was ranked #5 by the WBO, #7 by the WBA, #8 by the IBF and #10 by the WBC. The fight took place at The O2 Arena in London. It was agreed the winner of the fight would become the mandatory for the WBC title held by Deontay Wilder, even though Whyte had held the WBC's number one ranking for over a year. During the first few rounds of the fight, Rivas walked forward while Whyte used his long jab to keep him at bay. Whyte was rocked by Rivas a few times but came back quickly with his own combinations that made Rivas cover up and in the ninth-round Rivas dropped Whyte which he blamed on him crossing his legs while backing up. Whyte went on to win by UD and was later suspended of the WBC interim title after a drugs test came back with inconclusive results. He was later reinstated in December after being fully cleared before the fight against Mariusz Wach.

==== Whyte vs. Wach ====
On 27 November 2019, Matchroom Boxing announced that Whyte would be added to the Andy Ruiz Jr. vs. Anthony Joshua II undercard against veteran Mariusz Wach (35–5, 19 KOs) on 7 December at Diriyah Arena in Saudi Arabia. Whyte said, "I'm delighted to be fighting in Saudi Arabia against Mariusz Wach. He's probably got one of the best chins in the Heavyweight division." Whyte was originally scheduled to fight Wach in 2017. The fight was postponed due to Whyte suffering a foot injury. The fight was never rescheduled. Whyte weighed a career-high 271¼ pounds, 11 pounds heavier than his previous career-high as a professional. Wach weighed in 270 pounds.

In what was a 10-round gruelling fight, Whyte won via unanimous decision, with two judges scoring the bout 97–93 and the third scoring it 98–93. Wach came on much stronger towards the second half of the fight. He landed uppercuts and hooks to Whyte's head. Whyte had his right eye nearly closed by the end of the contest. Whyte stated he was 'thumbed' a few times, which caused the eye swelling. Wach landed huge left hook to Whyte, which left him stunned.

==== Whyte vs. Povetkin ====
Whyte was scheduled to defend his WBC interim title against Alexander Povetkin (35–2–1 24 KOs) on 2 May 2020 Manchester Arena, however, due to the COVID-19 pandemic the event was rescheduled for 22 August 2020 at the Matchroom Sport headquarters in Brentwood, Essex. Prior to the rescheduled fight, Whyte split with long-time coach Mark Tibbs. He promoted Xavier Miller from his team to head coach. Povetkin was ranked #6 by The Ring and #9 by the WBC at heavyweight. The event was on Sky Sports Box Office in the UK. Whyte weighed in at 252.6 pounds, much lighter than his previous bout and showed signs he was taking the fight more serious. Povetkin weighed 224 pounds.

Whyte lost the fight via knockout in the fifth round, losing his WBC interim title and mandatory position for Tyson Fury's WBC title. He had started off well and controlled the fight in the first four rounds, knocking Povetkin down twice in the fourth round. However, just 30 seconds into the following round, Povetkin landed an uppercut which left Whyte flat on his back, prompting the referee to call an immediate halt to the contest. Post-fight, Povetkin talked about how he had worked on the punch which gave him the knockout victory. Whyte stated he would activate the rematch clause. According to CompuBox Stats, Whyte landed 63 of 167 punches thrown with a connect rate of 37.7% and Povetkin was less accurate and less busier, only landed 34 of his 175 thrown (19.4%). However, it was the sole power punch landed in round 5 which made the difference.

=== Second reign as WBC interim heavyweight champion ===
==== Whyte vs. Povetkin II ====
An immediate rematch with Alexander Povetkin was scheduled for 21 November 2020, but was pushed back when Povetkin tested positive for COVID-19. It was reported on 1 December, that Povetkin had recovered and would begin training. A new date of 30 January 2021 was being explored for the rematch. Two weeks later, Povetkin's promoter Andrey Ryabinsky told reporters that Povetkin was still in fact recovering and was not able to complete in January. He later stated that Povetkin had been re-hospitalised. Whyte played down talks of Povetkin having COVID and suggested Povetkin just needed more time to get ready for the rematch.

On 15 January 2021, Hearn announced a PPV card on 6 March with Povetkin vs. Whyte for the interim WBC heavyweight title on the line as the headline. A full undercard was also announced, but no mention of a location. On 20 February, a new date of 27 March was announced, this was due to travel restrictions and the venue was confirmed to be Europe Point Sports Complex in Gibraltar. The fight was billed as "Rumble on the Rock!", linking it to the Rock of Gibraltar. Povetkin had been tested regularly since his cancelled fight with Deontay Wilder in 2016 and Whyte had also been tested more recently. For the weigh in, compared to the first meeting, Whyte came in lighter at 247¼ pounds and Povetkin came in slightly heavier at 228¼ pounds.

Whyte won via technical knockout in the fourth round. The win meant that Whyte regained the WBC interim heavyweight title. The fight was one-sided from the opening bell with Whyte hurting Povetkin with multiple clean shots which put Povetkin on unsteady legs. Whyte landed two right hands to the head of Povetkin followed by a left hook to the head which dropped him. Povetkin got up to beat the referees count but his corner threw the towel in, ending the fight. The time of stoppage was 2:39 of round 4. Povetkin only landed 8 punches of 72 thrown (11.1%) and Whyte threw 131 punches, landing 57 of them (43.5%), 30 of which were power punches. Many pundits and boxing experts believed Povetkin didn't recover fully from the effects of COVID.

Following the fight's conclusion, his promoter Eddie Hearn reaffirmed interest in staging a fight between Whyte and former WBC champion Deontay Wilder, calling a potential Wilder vs. Whyte showdown "a stadium fight, that's a colossal fight".

The fight would ultimately be the last of Povetkin's career, as he announced his retirement soon afterwards aged 41 on 13 June 2021.

==== Whyte vs. Fury ====
On 15 September 2021, it was reported that terms had been agreed between Whyte and Otto Wallin for a bout on 30 October at the O2 Arena in London for Whyte's WBC interim heavyweight title. However, a mere ten days before the fight was scheduled to occur, it was reported that the fight had been called off due to Whyte suffering a shoulder injury. Whyte ultimately did not reschedule the bout against Wallin, opting instead to wait for a shot at undefeated WBC and The Ring champion Tyson Fury, who himself had previously fought and defeated Wallin in September 2019.

On 30 December 2021, WBC president Mauricio Sulaiman, who had ordered Fury to defend his WBC title against Whyte, ruled that the champion Fury would be entitled to 80% of the purse, compared to Whyte's 20% as the challenger. Sulaiman had set a deadline of 11 January 2022 for purse bids, as the two fighters' camps could not agree to terms. However, this deadline was pushed back multiple times, in part due to ongoing negotiations from Fury's team who were trying to secure the fight for the undisputed heavyweight championship against undefeated WBA (Super), IBF and WBO heavyweight champion Oleksandr Usyk. A fight between Fury and Usyk did not materialise, as deposed former champion Anthony Joshua was unwilling to step aside to allow the two champions to fight.

The deadline for the Fury-Whyte purse bids was ultimately scheduled for 28 January 2022, when it was announced that Frank Warren's Queensberry Promotions had won the rights to promote the fight, with a winning bid of $41,025,000 (£31 million), beating out the $32,222,222 (£24 million) bid submitted by Eddie Hearn's Matchroom. Warren's bid was reported to be the highest successful purse bid in boxing history.

Whyte unexpectedly boxed the first round in the southpaw stance, which was unusual for the primarily orthodox fighter. After a cautious first three minutes, Fury returned the favour at the start of the second round by switching between the southpaw and orthodox stances. The champion found success with the jab and check hook. In the fourth round, Whyte was cut over his right eye after a clash of heads. Fury continued to dominate the fight, landing a straight right in the fifth round which appeared to momentarily stun the challenger. With around ten seconds left of the sixth round, Fury landed a left jab, followed by a right uppercut which sent Whyte sprawling to the canvas. Although Whyte was able to beat the count and rise to his feet, the referee deemed it unsafe for him to continue, halting the fight after two minutes and fifty-nine seconds of the sixth round, declaring Fury the winner by sixth-round technical knockout. At the time of the stoppage, Whyte was behind on the judges' scorecards with 49–46, 48–47, and 50–45.

=== Post-title career ===
On 30 September 2022, Whyte appointed Hall of Famer Buddy McGirt as his head trainer replacing Xavier Miller and Harold Knight. McGirt, a well known trainer, previously had trained the likes of Arturo Gatti, Vernon Forrest, Antonio Tarver and Sergey Kovalev. In 2002, Boxing Writers Association of America named McGirt trainer of the year. According to Whyte, McGirt doesn't change a boxers style, rather adds to the style, to make it stronger.

==== Whyte vs. Franklin ====
On 19 October, multiple reports confirmed Whyte would make his ring return in a scheduled 12 round bout against American contender Jermaine Franklin (21–0, 14 KOs) on 26 November at the OVO Arena Wembley in London. Two days later, the fight and card was made official and would stream on DAZN worldwide. Speaking to The DAZN Boxing Show, Hearn told fans, if Whyte was to win this fight and avoid injuries, he would be favourite to fight Anthony Joshua in 2023, a rematch from their 2015 fight. Going into the fight, Whyte was aiming for a knockout win. Whyte weighed 251 pounds for the fight and Franklin, slightly heavier, at 257 pounds.

In an uneventful bout, which went the 12 round distance, Whyte won via majority decision by the scores of 115–115 and 116–112 (twice). In the opening rounds, Franklin had Whyte on the backfoot and controlled the rounds, out-landing him with the jab. In the round 3, Whyte attacked the body. During the mid rounds, Whyte continued to land, however Franklin did well to counter. Both boxers were warned by referee John Latham. Whyte was warned in round 9 for not breaking breaking and Franklin in round 11 for use of head. There was back and forth action in the last round with Whyte connecting the eye-catching left hand to Franklin's chin, causing him to back up against the ropes. According to CompuBox, Franklin landed 165 of his 606 punches thrown (27.2%), 105 of which were power punches. Whyte connected with 144 of 608 punches thrown (23.2%). Over the distance, Franklin landed 23 more body punches.

Many thought Whyte was lucky to have taken the win, with many observers feeling Franklin should have win, or a draw was a fair result. Whyte shrugged this off, calling it a close affair and a close but clear win for himself and said he pressed more in the fight. Whyte admitted he had spoken with his team and would have retired, had he lost the fight. Franklin felt he did enough, especially in the earlier rounds to earn the victory and wanted a rematch in the future. During the post-fight press conference, reporters kept asking about a possible rematch, to which Whyte responded, "Why you keep getting in about this rematch? Are you part of Jermaine Franklin's team? […] Relax, man. Listen, it was a fight. How much close fights have there been in boxing? Do you like say, 'Oh, this guy should have a rematch, have a rematch.' You're just talkin' sh*t, man. Relax. It was a close fight. I won clearly, so why would I consider a rematch?"

==== Failed drug test ====
On 2 July 2023, Sky Sports announced that Whyte had signed and sent back the contract which would confirm his rematch against old rival Anthony Joshua (25–3, 22 KOs). On 6 July, a press release made the fight official to take place on 12 August at The O2 Arena in London, where the first fight also took place. The event would be broadcast on DAZN worldwide and DAZN PPV in the UK. Joshua had recently snapped a two-fight losing streak, beating former Whyte opponent Jermaine Franklin via decision in April 2023. The British public made their feelings known at the increased PPV price. Fans would not get the fight as part of their monthly subscription. The price set was £26.99, higher than the £24.95 price tag for Fury-Whyte in 2022. Eddie Hearn justified the price saying there would be a 'fantastic' undercard. Looking ahead of the fight, Joshua mapped out his next fights, ideally being Deontay Wilder and then Tyson Fury.

On 5 August 2023, it was announced that Whyte had received a positive drug test and later it was announced that he would be replaced by Robert Helenius in the fight. The failed test was from a random anti-doping protocol. The name of the substance was not given at the time. Whyte put out a statement via his many social media channels stating, "I am shocked and devastated to learn of a report by VADA of adverse findings relating to me. I only learned of it this morning and am still reacting to it. I have also just seen that the fight is being cancelled without having any chance to demonstrate my innocence before the decision was taken. I can confirm without a shadow of doubt that I have not taken the reported substance, in this camp or at any point in my life. I am completely innocent and ask to be given the time to go through the process of proving this without anybody jumping to conclusions or a trial by media." Whyte said he was always an advocate of random drug testing, having done many random tests voluntarily over the years. As of 9 August, Whyte was no longer licensed by the BBBofC. According to Hearn, when asked by reporters, he confirmed the fight would more than likely not be rescheduled in the future.

An investigation later found the positive drug test to be a result of a contaminated supplement and Whyte was cleared to resume his boxing career.

==== Whyte vs. Hammer ====
Whyte did not waste any time in announcing his next fight giving himself 10 days notice. He was scheduled to fight Christian Hammer, headlining a card billed "Once Upon a Time in the West" on 17 March 2024, Saint Patrick's Day at the TF Royal Theatre in Castlebar, Ireland. Whyte was ready to put the past several months behind him and said it had always been a dream to fight in Ireland. Whyte was not happy that he had only fought four times in 4 years. He still believed he could get himself back into world title contention. Platform Sport, which was run by Michael Ofo, promoted their debut show, which was also sold out. For the fight, Whyte weighed 257 pounds, while Hammer weighed 274 pounds.

Hammer failed to get up from his stool for the start of the fourth round, handing Whyte the win via corner retirement. The opening two rounds were evenly matched. Whyte landed to the head and body or Hammer, who also had little trouble in landing clean shots to Whyte's head. In round 3, Whyte landed hard body shots, constantly backing Hammer against the ropes. Whyte was frustrated following the win as he had prepared hard for the fight. Whyte called Hammer a coward after the fight, also noting that he approached the fight in a very negative manner. Trainer McGirt wanted Whyte to be active in 2024, mentioning a possible fight again in the Summer. McGirt also believed Whyte could still win a world title.

==== Whyte vs. Tetteh ====
In November 2024, during the broadcast of Chris Billam-Smith vs. Gilberto Ramirez, DAZN announced Whyte would return to the ring on December 15 at the Europa Point Sports Complex in Gibraltar against Ghanaian boxer Ebenezer Tetteh (23–1, 20 KOs). Tetteh's only loss came to Daniel Dubois in September 2019 via a first round stoppage. Tetteh was on a 4-fight win streak since then. Whyte won the bout by stoppage in the seventh round. Tetteh opened the fight positively, going for Whyte and even backing him up against the ropes. Whyte managed to slip most of the shots. Tetteh looked tired following the first round and remaining fatigued, only having little success until the end. Tetteh's nose was busted in round 4, which put him back on the attack. Whyte attempted to knock out Tetteh in round 7. The fight became ugly with Whyte beginning to use roughhouse tactics. Post-fight, Whyte spoke about his frustration and said he wanted to get rounds in after not being active enough. He again stated his desire to fight on a future Riyadh Season card.

==== Cancelled Joe Joyce fight ====
On 8 February 2025, it was reported by The Ring Magazine, Queensberry Promotions' debut card on DAZN would take place on 5 April with the headline bout being Whyte vs. Joe Joyce (16–3, 15 KOs) in a heavyweight contest. Joyce was already scheduled to fight Patrick Korte on a 1 March card, which would be considered a warm up and Joyce had only won one in his last four. Two days later the fight card was announced via a press conference in Manchester, with the event taking place at the Co-op Live Arena. There was an awkward exchange during the press conference between Whyte and Joyce, when Whyte called him 'boring'. This was a response to Joyce telling the media that he was going knock Whyte out. Whyte said, "Joe Joyce said he's going to knock me out on the 5th of April – we'll see. Joe Joyce is going to put me to sleep but not by knocking him out because he's f--cking boring. He's the only man I know who can put coffee to sleep. Boring as f--k. Great fighter, but a boring guy… I just come to fight. I never said I was the best fighter in the world but I come to fight. His main defense is to hit until he gets tired," Joyce replied, "It works." After a small back and forth, Whyte noted that Joyce was a nice guy. On 4 March, TalkSport reported that Whyte had pulled out of the fight with Joyce after picking up an injury in training. Joyce would remain on the card, looking for a new opponent. Filip Hrgović would eventually replace the injured Whyte and beat Joyce by unanimous decision.

==== Whyte vs. Itauma ====
On 14 May 2025, Whyte appeared at the press conference of Fabio Wardley vs. Justis Huni, to announce that he would make his ring return on the undercard. The card was scheduled for 7 June at Portman Road Stadium in Ipswich. Whyte wanted a big Summer fight and this was a way to ease into it, rather than not fight. He admitted, "Inactivity has basically killed my career in the last three years. I am looking at having a big fight at the end of July or early August and I just thought I need some activity before heading into that." At the age of 37, Whyte wanted one more world title shot. On 4 June, it was announced that Whyte would no longer appear on the undercard. Frank Warren explained that a potential big fight was being explored for Whyte in August 2025.

On 7 June 2025, a trio of fights was announced to take place in Riyadh, Saudi Arabia on 16 August (billed as "Esports World Cup Fight Week" after the esports tournament series held in Riyadh), with Whyte headlining against rising British prospect Moses Itauma (12–0, 10 KOs). Whyte disclosed that although he was presented with rematch opportunities against Anthony Joshua and Joseph Parker, he chose to take on the challenge of facing Itauma instead. He stated that Joshua "wasn't ready," and he was unable to reach an agreement with Parker. Whyte also hit out at former rival Derek Chisora, who revealed he rejected a $2 million offer to fight Itauma, before the fight was offered to him. Whyte likened his upcoming match with Itauma to the moment in 2004 when David Haye dramatically lost his undefeated status to Carl Thompson. He drew motivation from that fight, feeling that as the underdog, he isn't being given a chance to defeat Itauma. Whyte weighed in at 244.1 pounds, a stone lighter than his last bout and his lightest since 2015. Itauma weighed 245.5 pounds.

Itauma achieved a decisive victory over Whyte, securing a knockout in the first round within a duration of less than two minutes. From the outset, Itauma established dominance, utilizing his youth, speed, and power to gain the upper hand against Whyte. He delivered a rapid series of punches targeting both the head and body, efficiently pushing Whyte onto the ropes. Itauma delivered a right hook that caused Whyte to be knocked down, prompting the referee to stop the fight at 1:59 of the first round. Whyte landed only two jabs. Itauma landed 19 of 34 punches (55.9%). Itauma successfully claimed the vacant commonwealth title, which was confirmed to be on the line during the fight week. A few days following the fight, Whyte expressed that he had no plans to retire and intended to continue his boxing career.

==== Whyte vs. TBA ====
Derek Chisora made an appearance at The O2 Arena on 25 October, during the Parker-Wardley event, alongside other heavyweight contenders. It was revealed that Chisora's next opponent was likely to be Whyte, in a trilogy fight. Chisora was willing to fight if the contract terms were favorable. Jarrell Miller was reportedly rejected by Chisora from the shortlist of potential opponents, which included Zhilei Zhang. Warren stated, "Chisora against Whyte is done and dusted. We've got a couple of bits to sort out but I'll sort them out." He also stated the fight would headline the event, with Itauma's fight being pushed back to 2026. Whyte was eager and recognized the importance of the fight given his age and career trajectory. He acknowledged Chisora as a challenging opponent. While there is mutual respect, there was also some personal tension, with Whyte describing Chisora as a bully. On 1 November, Dan Rafael reported that the fight was cancelled, and Chisora would no longer be competing on 13 December. There was speculation that Chisora might have suffered an injury, but this was not confirmed. Chisora stated that the fight contract did not meet his expectations, leading him to tear it up. Whyte was then linked to a fight with British rival Lawrence Okolie on 19 December in Nigeria, promoted by Amir Khan. The offer to Whyte was deemed unsatisfactory by his manager Michael Ofo. He described the proposal as "embarrassing" and unworthy of consideration, stating that it was so low that he did not even present it to Whyte.

In July 2026, Whyte discussed his plans for a return. He said he was back in training and intended to take a comeback fight to regain momentum before pursuing a higher-profile opponent. Whyte identified Chisora, Andy Ruiz Jr. and Jarrell Miller as heavyweights from his era whom he had not previously fought, stating, "These are guys from my era that I didn't fight and I'd love to fight them."

== Personal life ==
Whyte has three children. He had his first at 13. He has highlighted his early boxing idols as including Jack Dempsey, Sonny Liston, Archie Moore, Lennox Lewis and James Toney.

== Professional boxing record ==
| 35 fights | 31 wins | 4 losses |
|---|---|---|
| By knockout | 21 | 4 |
| By decision | 10 | 0 |

| No. | Result | Record | Opponent | Type | Round, time | Date | Location | Notes |
|---|---|---|---|---|---|---|---|---|
| 35 | Loss | 31–4 | Moses Itauma | TKO | 1 (10), 1:59 | 16 Aug 2025 | anb Arena, Riyadh, Saudi Arabia | For WBA International, WBO Inter-Continental, and vacant Commonwealth heavyweight titles |
| 34 | Win | 31–3 | Ebenezer Tetteh | RTD | 7 (10) 3:00 | 15 Dec 2024 | Europa Point Sports Complex, Gibraltar | |
| 33 | Win | 30–3 | Christian Hammer | RTD | 3 (10) 3:00 | 17 Mar 2024 | TF Royal Theatre, Castlebar, Ireland | |
| 32 | Win | 29–3 | Jermaine Franklin | MD | 12 | 26 Nov 2022 | Wembley Arena, London, England | |
| 31 | Loss | 28–3 | Tyson Fury | TKO | 6 (12) 2:59 | 23 Apr 2022 | Wembley Stadium, London, England | For WBC and The Ring heavyweight titles |
| 30 | Win | 28–2 | Alexander Povetkin | TKO | 4 (12), 2:39 | 27 Mar 2021 | Europa Point Sports Complex, Gibraltar | Won WBC interim heavyweight title |
| 29 | Loss | 27–2 | Alexander Povetkin | KO | 5 (12), 0:30 | 22 Aug 2020 | Matchroom Sport Headquarters, Brentwood, England | Lost WBC interim heavyweight title |
| 28 | Win | 27–1 | Mariusz Wach | UD | 10 | 7 Dec 2019 | Diriyah Arena, Diriyah, Saudi Arabia | |
| 27 | Win | 26–1 | Óscar Rivas | UD | 12 | 20 Jul 2019 | The O2 Arena, London, England | Won vacant WBC interim heavyweight title |
| 26 | Win | 25–1 | Derek Chisora | KO | 11 (12), 1:56 | 22 Dec 2018 | The O2 Arena, London, England | Retained WBC Silver and WBO International heavyweight titles |
| 25 | Win | 24–1 | Joseph Parker | UD | 12 | 28 Jul 2018 | The O2 Arena, London, England | Retained WBC Silver heavyweight title; Won vacant WBO International heavyweight title |
| 24 | Win | 23–1 | Lucas Browne | KO | 6 (12), 0:37 | 24 Mar 2018 | The O2 Arena, London, England | Retained WBC Silver heavyweight title |
| 23 | Win | 22–1 | Robert Helenius | UD | 12 | 28 Oct 2017 | Millennium Stadium, Cardiff, Wales | Won vacant WBC Silver heavyweight title |
| 22 | Win | 21–1 | Malcolm Tann | TKO | 3 (8), 2:36 | 19 Aug 2017 | Pinnacle Bank Arena, Lincoln, Nebraska, US | |
| 21 | Win | 20–1 | Derek Chisora | SD | 12 | 10 Dec 2016 | Manchester Arena, Manchester, England | Retained WBC International heavyweight title |
| 20 | Win | 19–1 | Ian Lewison | RTD | 10 (12), 3:00 | 7 Oct 2016 | The SSE Hydro, Glasgow, Scotland | Won vacant British heavyweight title |
| 19 | Win | 18–1 | David Allen | UD | 10 | 30 Jul 2016 | First Direct Arena, Leeds, England | Won vacant WBC International heavyweight title |
| 18 | Win | 17–1 | Ivica Bacurin | KO | 6 (8), 2:08 | 25 Jun 2016 | The O2 Arena, London, England | |
| 17 | Loss | 16–1 | Anthony Joshua | TKO | 7 (12), 1:27 | 12 Dec 2015 | The O2 Arena, London, England | For WBC International, Commonwealth, and vacant British heavyweight titles |
| 16 | Win | 16–0 | Brian Minto | KO | 3 (10), 2:36 | 12 Sep 2015 | The O2 Arena, London, England | Won vacant WBC International Silver heavyweight title |
| 15 | Win | 15–0 | Irineu Beato Costa Junior | TKO | 1 (8), 2:41 | 1 Aug 2015 | Craven Park, Hull, England | |
| 14 | Win | 14–0 | Beka Lobjanidze | KO | 4 (10), 1:10 | 28 Feb 2015 | Odyssey Arena, Belfast, Northern Ireland | |
| 13 | Win | 13–0 | Marcelo Nascimento | KO | 2 (8), 0:41 | 7 Feb 2015 | Camden Centre, London, England | |
| 12 | Win | 12–0 | Kamil Sokolowski | TKO | 3 (6), 2:23 | 20 Dec 2014 | City Hall, Hull, England | |
| 11 | Win | 11–0 | Tomas Mrazek | TKO | 3 (6), 2:25 | 28 Nov 2014 | Camden Centre, London, England | |
| 10 | Win | 10–0 | Ante Verunica | TKO | 2 (6), 2:30 | 21 Nov 2014 | Camden Centre, London, England | |
| 9 | Win | 9–0 | Sandor Balogh | TKO | 4 (6), 1:13 | 13 Oct 2012 | Bluewater, Stone, England | Although the result was disqualified by UKAD after Whyte failed a drug test, the BBBofC ultimately upheld Whyte's victory |
| 8 | Win | 8–0 | Mike Holden | TKO | 3 (6), 1:35 | 15 Sep 2012 | York Hall, London, England | |
| 7 | Win | 7–0 | Gabor Farkas | KO | 2 (6), 1:38 | 7 Jul 2012 | York Hall, London, England | |
| 6 | Win | 6–0 | Zurab Noniashvili | TKO | 1 (6), 0:52 | 19 May 2012 | Aintree Racecourse, Liverpool, England | |
| 5 | Win | 5–0 | Kristian Kirilov | TKO | 1 (6), 1:33 | 2 Mar 2012 | Troxy, London, England | |
| 4 | Win | 4–0 | Hastings Rasani | PTS | 4 | 21 Jan 2012 | Liverpool Olympia, Liverpool, England | |
| 3 | Win | 3–0 | Toni Visic | TKO | 3 (4), 1:46 | 3 Dec 2011 | York Hall, London, England | |
| 2 | Win | 2–0 | Remigijus Ziausys | PTS | 4 | 16 Sep 2011 | The Coronet, London, England | |
| 1 | Win | 1–0 | Tayar Mehmed | PTS | 4 | 13 May 2011 | Medway Park, Gillingham, England | |

== Mixed martial arts record ==
Professional record breakdown
| 1 match | 1 win | 0 losses |
| By knockout | 1 | 0 |

| Res. | Record | Opponent | Method | Event | Date | Round | Time | Location | Notes |
|---|---|---|---|---|---|---|---|---|---|
| Win | 1–0 | Mark Stroud | KO (punch) | UCMMA 1: Bad Breed | 6 December 2008 | 1 | 0:12 | London, England | |

== Pay-per-view bouts ==
| Date | Fight | Network | Buys | Source(s) |
|---|---|---|---|---|
| 12 December 2015 | Anthony Joshua vs. Dillian Whyte | Sky Box Office | 699,000 | |
| 28 July 2018 | Dillian Whyte vs. Joseph Parker | Sky Box Office | 571,000 | |
| 22 December 2018 | Dillian Whyte vs. Derek Chisora II | Sky Box Office | 532,000 | |
| 20 July 2019 | Dillian Whyte vs. Oscar Rivas | Sky Box Office | 368,000 | |
| 22 August 2020 | Dillian Whyte vs. Alexander Povetkin | Sky Box Office | 337,000 (Note: highest recorded buyrate within four week reach) | |
| 27 March 2021 | Alexander Povetkin vs. Dillian Whyte II | Sky Box Office | 197,000 | |
| 23 April 2022 | Tyson Fury vs. Dillian Whyte | BT Sport Box Office | | |
| 16 August 2025 | Moses Itauma vs. Dillian Whyte | DAZN PPV | | |
| | Total buys | | 2,704,000 | |

== Notes ==
Sporting positions
Regional boxing titles
| Vacant Title last held by Edmund Gerber | WBC International Silver heavyweight champion 12 September 2015 – May 2016; Vacated | Vacant Title next held by Andriy Rudenko |
| Vacant Title last held by Anthony Joshua | WBC International heavyweight champion 30 July 2016 – 28 October 2017; Won Silver title | Vacant Title next held by Sergey Kuzmin |
| Vacant Title last held by Anthony Joshua | British heavyweight champion 7 October 2016 – 12 January 2017; Vacated | Vacant Title next held by Sam Sexton |
| Vacant Title last held by Johann Duhaupas | WBC Silver heavyweight champion 28 October 2017 – 20 July 2019; Won interim title | Vacant Title next held by Daniel Dubois |
| Vacant Title last held by Alexander Povetkin | WBO International heavyweight champion 28 July 2018 – September 2019; Vacated | Vacant Title next held by Daniel Dubois |
World boxing titles
| Vacant Title last held by Samuel Peter | WBC heavyweight champion Interim title 20 July 2019 – 22 August 2020 | Succeeded by Alexander Povetkin |
| Preceded by Alexander Povetkin | WBC heavyweight champion Interim title 27 March 2021 – 23 April 2022; Failed to win full title | Vacant Title next held by Agit Kabayel |
Awards
| Previous: Krzysztof Głowacki vs. Marco Huck; Round 6 | ESPN Round of the Year vs. Derek Chisora; Round 5; 2016 | Next: Anthony Joshua vs. Wladimir Klitschko; Round 5 |
