= Dillian Whyte vs Alexander Povetkin =

Boxing competition

Dillian Whyte vs. Alexander Povetkin
- Date: 22 August 2020
- Venue: Matchroom Sport Headquarters, Brentwood, Essex, UK
- Title(s) on the line: WBC interim and inaugural WBC Diamond heavyweight titles

Tale of the tape
Boxer	(United Kingdom) Dillian Whyte	(Russia) Alexander Povetkin
Nickname	"The Body Snatcher"	"Sasha"
Hometown	Brixton, London, UK	Kursk, Kursk Oblast, Russia
Pre-fight record	27–1 (18 KO)	35–2–1 (24 KO)
Age	32 years, 4 months	40 years, 11 months
Height	6 ft 4 in (193 cm)	6 ft 2 in (188 cm)
Weight	252 lb (114 kg)	224 lb (102 kg)
Style	Orthodox	Orthodox
Recognition	WBC; Interim Heavyweight Champion; The Ring; No. 2 Ranked Heavyweight; TBRB; No. 4 Ranked Heavyweight	WBC; No. 9 Ranked heavyweight The Ring/TBRB; No. 6 Ranked Heavyweight

Result
- Povetkin defeated Whyte via fifth-round KO

Dillian Whyte vs. Alexander Povetkin was a heavyweight professional boxing match contested between the defending WBC interim champion Dillian Whyte and former WBA (regular) titleholder Alexander Povetkin, with Whyte's WBC interim title on the line.

== Background ==
The event was originally scheduled to take place on 2 May 2020 at the Manchester Arena in Manchester, England, but was rescheduled twice due to the COVID-19 pandemic with the event being finalised for 22 August at the headquarters of Matchroom Boxing in Brentwood, Essex.

== The fight ==
Povetkin defeated Whyte via fifth-round knockout, having been down twice himself in the fourth and well down on all the scorecards.

== Aftermath ==
The two would have a rematch the following March.

== Fight card ==
Weight Class	Weight		vs.		Method	Round	Time	Note
Main card
Heavyweight	14 st 4 lb+	(Russia) Alexander Povetkin	def.	(United Kingdom) Dillian Whyte (ic)	KO	5/12	0:30	^{Note 1}
Lightweight	9 st 9 lb	(Republic of Ireland) Katie Taylor (c)	def	(Belgium) Delfine Persoon	UD	10		^{Note 2}
Welterweight	10 st 7 lb	(United Kingdom) Chris Kongo	def.	(United Kingdom) Luther Clay (c)	TKO	9/10	2:44	^{note 3}
Heavyweight	14 st 4 lb+	(Croatia) Alen Babić	def.	(United States) Shawndell Winters	TKO	2/8	2:20
Super Middleweight	12 st	(United Kingdom) Zak Chelli	draw	(United Kingdom) Jack Cullen	SD	10

^Note 1 For WBC interim heavyweight title
^Note 2 For undisputed WBA, WBC, IBF, WBO, and The Ring female lightweight titles
^Note 3 For WBO Global welterweight title

== Broadcasters ==
The fight was televised live in the United Kingdom and Ireland on PPV's Sky Sports Box Office, as well as in Russia on Ren TV (FTA) and A1 TV (via Amediateka)

Country	Broadcaster			
Country	Free-to-air	Cable/Pay TV	PPV	Stream
United Kingdom (host)	—N/a		Sky Sports Box Office	
Ireland	—N/a		Sky Sports Box Office	
Russia	Ren TV	A1	—N/a	Amediateka
Worldwide	—N/a			DAZN^{INT}
Albania	—N/a	SuperSport	—N/a	DigitAlb
Kosovo	—N/a	SuperSport	—N/a	TVim
Australia	—N/a	Fox Sports	—N/a	Foxtel Now
Australia	—N/a	Fox Sports	—N/a	Kayo Sports
Balkans: Bosnia and Herzegovina; Croatia; Montenegro; North Macedonia; Serbia	—N/a	Arena Sport	—N/a	
Baltics: Estonia; Latvia; Lithuania	—N/a	TV3 Sport	—N/a	Go3
Czech Republic	—N/a	Sport1	—N/a	
Hungary	—N/a	Sport1	—N/a	
Slovakia	—N/a	Sport1	—N/a	
Latin America: Argentina; Bolivia; Chile; Colombia; Costa Rica; Dominican Republic; Ecuador; El Salvador; Guatemala; Honduras; Mexico; Nicaragua; Panama; Paraguay; Peru; Uruguay; Venezuela	—N/a	ESPN	—N/a	WatchESPN
New Zealand	—N/a		Spark	
Poland	TVP Sport	—N/a		TVP Stream
Turkey	—N/a			SSport+

^INT- the coverage is not available in UK, IRL, CAN, and selected countries.

== See also ==
- Alexander Povetkin vs. Dillian Whyte II

Preceded by vs. Mariusz Wach	Dillian Whyte' bouts 22 August 2020	Succeeded by Rematch
Preceded by vs. Michael Hunter	Alexander Povetkin's bouts 22 August 2020	Succeeded by Rematch
