= Chris Kongo =

British boxer (born 1992)

Personal information
- Nickname: 2Slick
- Nationality: British
- Born: Christian Mbwakongo; 23 December 1992 (age 33) London, England
- Height: 6 ft (183 cm)
- Weight: Welterweight

Boxing career
- Stance: Orthodox

Boxing record
- Total fights: 21
- Wins: 17
- Win by KO: 7
- Losses: 4

Chris Kongo (born 23 December 1992) is a British professional boxer.

== Boxing career ==
On 22 August 2020 Kongo won his first professional title with a ninth-round TKO victory over Luther Clay to win the WBO Global Welterweight Title. Kongo later lost the title on 28 March 2021 to Michael McKinson by Unanimous Decision. On 11 July 2022 Kongo defeated Sebastian Formella by unanimous decision to win the vacant WBC International Silver Welterweight title.

On March 31, 2024, in London, Kongo was scheduled to face Florian Marku.

Kongo secured the finest victory of his career with a unanimous decision win over Marku using his height and reach advantage to negate Marku's aggression. The judges scored it as a unanimous decision and a clear win for the vacant IBO Inter-Continental Welter Title.

He lost on points to Owen Cooper in a 10-round contest at Nottingham Arena on 10 May 2025.

== Professional boxing record ==
20 fights	17 wins	3 losses
By knockout	7	0
By decision	10	3

No.	Result	Record	Opponent	Type	Round, time	Date	Location	Notes
21	Loss	17–4	Elliot Eboige	TKO	1 (6)	Dec 13, 2025	Sir James Wakey Hall, Watford Green, England	
20	Loss	17–3	Owen Cooper	PTS	10	May 10, 2025	Nottingham Arena, Nottingham, England	
19	Win	17–2	John Henry Mosquera	PTS	6	Dec 18, 2024	Boulevard Hall, Riyadh, Saudi Arabia	
18	Win	16–2	Jacob Quinn	PTS	6	Sep 18, 2024	Wembley Arena, Wembley, England	
17	Win	15–2	Florian Marku	UD	10	Mar 31, 2024	O2 Arena, Greenwich, England	Won vacant IBO Intercontinental welterweight title
16	Loss	14–2	Ekow Essuman	MD	12	Jan 21, 2023	Wembley Arena, Wembley, England	For the British, Commonwealth, and IBF European titles; Lost WBC International Silver welterweight title
15	Win	14–1	Sebastian Formella	UD	10	Jun 11, 2022	Manchester Arena, Manchester, England	Won vacant WBC International Silver welterweight title
14	Win	13–1	Kelvin Dotel	PTS	8	Mar 26, 2022	Wembley Arena, Wembley, England	
13	Loss	12–1	Michael McKinson	UD	10	Mar 27, 2021	Europa Point Sports Complex, Gibraltar	Lost WBO Global welterweight title
12	Win	12–0	Luther Clay	TKO	9 (10), 2:44	Aug 22, 2020	Matchroom HQ Garden, Brentwood, England	Won WBO Global welterweight title
11	Win	11–0	Fernando Valencia	PTS	6	Apr 20, 2019	Lee Valley Leisure Complex, Athletics Centre, Edmonton, England	
10	Win	10–0	Adam Grabiec	PTS	6	Sep 29, 2018	York Hall, Bethnal Green, England	
9	Win	9–0	Arvydas Trizno	TKO	1 (6), 1:14	Jun 30, 2018	York Hall, Bethnal Green, England	
8	Win	8–0	Serge Ambomo	PTS	6	24 Mar 2018	O2 Arena, Greenwich, England	
7	Win	7–0	Evgeni Borisov	KO	3 (6), 0:42	Nov 10, 2017	York Hall, Bethnal Green, England	
6	Win	6–0	Bronislav Kubin	TKO	1 (6), 0:56	Oct 7, 2017	York Hall, Bethnal Green, England	
5	Win	5–0	William Warburton	PTS	4	Jul 15, 2017	Wembley Arena, Wembley, England	
4	Win	4–0	Michal Vosyka	KO	1 (4), 0:49	May 27, 2017	York Hall, Bethnal Green, England	
3	Win	3–0	Edvinas Puplauskas	TKO	1 (4), 1:28	Feb 4, 2017	Olympia London, Kensington, England	
2	Win	2–0	William Warburton	PTS	4	Oct 15, 2016	York Hall, Bethnal Green, England	
1	Win	1–0	Jason Nesbitt	KO	1 (6), 0:56	Aug 6, 2016	York Hall, Bethnal Green, England	
