= Troy Williamson (boxer) =

English boxer (born 1991)

Personal information
- Nickname: Trojan
- Nationality: English
- Born: 22 August 1991 (age 35) Darlington, County Durham, England
- Height: 5 ft 11 in (180 cm)
- Weight: Light-middleweight; Middleweight; Super-middleweight

Boxing career
- Stance: Orthodox

Boxing record
- Total fights: 28
- Wins: 22
- Win by KO: 16
- Losses: 5
- Draws: 1
Medal record
Men's amateur boxing
Representing England
English National Championships
Silver medal – second place	2014 Liverpool	Middleweight
Gold medal – first place	2015 Liverpool	Middleweight
GB Championships
Gold medal – first place	2015 Sheffield	Middleweight

Troy Williamson (born 22 August 1991) is an English professional boxer. He is a former British, Commonwealth and European super-middleweight champion. He has also held the British light-middleweight title. As an amateur, Williamson won the 2015 ABA Championships in the middleweight division.

== Early life and amateur career ==
Troy Williamson was born on 22 August 1991 in Darlington, England. The fourth youngest of 11 children, he first began boxing at the age of 10. As the age for participating in competitive fights is 11, he quickly became bored of the training regime and walked away from the sport. He regained interest at the age of 17, going on to compile a record of 68–15. During his amateur career he reached the finals of two ABA Championships; losing against Anthony Fowler at the 2014 edition and winning the competition the following year. He also represented England at the 2015 European Championships, losing in the quarter-finals, and competed at the 2015 and 2016 World Series of Boxing as part of the British Lionhearts.

== Professional career ==
Williamson made his professional debut on 29 October 2016, scoring a third-round knockout victory over Borislav Zankov at the Meadowbank Sports Centre in Edinburgh, Scotland. After compiling a record of 12–0–1 (9 KOs) he faced Dario Socci for the vacant IBF European junior-middleweight title on 21 December 2019 at the Copper Box Arena in London. Williamson captured his first professional title by defeating Socci via technical knockout (TKO) in the tenth and final round.

He won the British light-middleweight title by knocking out defending champion Ted Cheeseman in the 10th round at Liverpool Arena on 9 October 2021.

Despite being knocked to the canvas in the second round, Williamson successfully defended the title with a unanimous decision win over Mason Cartwright at Newcastle Arena on 25 March 2022.

Back at the same venue, he lost the championship in his second defense against Josh Kelly on 2 December 2022, going down to a unanimous decision defeat.

Williamson was due to face English super-middleweight champion Mark Dickinson at Rainton Meadows Arena in Houghton-le-Spring on 6 September 2025, but his opponent failed to make the required weight and was stripped of the title. The fight went ahead with only Williamson now able to claim the vacant championship, and he did just that by stopping Dickinson in the ninth round.

He challenged European, British and Commonwealth super-middleweight champion Callum Simpson at First Direct Arena in Leeds on 20 December 2025. Williamson sent Simpson to the canvas four times in the 10th round and won via technical knockout when the referee waived the fight off following the fourth knock down.

Without making any defenses, Williamson vacated the European super-middleweight title on 26 January 2026 after Simpson invoked a rematch clause in their original fight contract. This was due to European Boxing Union rules which forbid direct rematches, forcing him to give up the championship. The rematch took place back at the First Direct Arena in Leeds on 8 August 2026. Williamson lost by unanimous decision.

== Professional boxing record ==
28 fights	22 wins	5 losses
By knockout	16	0
By decision	6	5
Draws	1	

No.	Result	Record	Opponent	Type	Round, time	Date	Location	Notes
28	Loss	22–5–1	Callum Simpson	UD	12	8 Aug 2026	First Direct Arena, Leeds, England	Lost British and Commonwealth super-middleweight titles
27	Win	22–4–1	Callum Simpson	TKO	10 (12), 2:21	20 Dec 2025	First Direct Arena, Leeds, England	Won British, European and Commonwealth super-middleweight titles
26	Win	21–4–1	Mark Dickinson	TKO	9 (10), 1:51	6 Sep 2025	Rainton Meadows Arena, Houghton-le-Spring, England	Won vacant English super-middleweight title
25	Loss	20–4–1	Jahi Tucker	UD	10	5 Apr 2025	Palms Casino Resort, Las Vegas, USA	
24	Loss	20–3–1	Ishmael Davis	UD	12	23 Mar 2024	Sheffield Arena, Sheffield, England	
23	Loss	20–2–1	Caoimhín Agyarko	SD	10	2 Dec 2023	SSE Arena, Belfast, Northern Ireland	For WBA Continental light-middleweight title
22	Win	20–1–1	Ramiro Blanco	PTS	6	15 Jul 2023	Eagles Community Centre, Newcastle, England	
21	Loss	19–1–1	Josh Kelly	UD	12	2 Dec 2022	Newcastle Arena, Newcastle, England	Lost British light-middleweight title
20	Win	19–0–1	David Benitez	TKO	6 (8), 2:46	17 Sep 2022	Bolton Whites Hotel, Bolton, England	
19	Win	18–0–1	Mason Cartwright	UD	12	25 Mar 2022	Newcastle Arena, Newcastle, England	Retained British light-middleweight title
18	Win	17–0–1	Ted Cheeseman	KO	10 (12), 0:50	9 Oct 2021	Liverpool Arena, Liverpool, England	Won British light-middleweight title
17	Win	16–0–1	Kieran Smith	TKO	6 (12), 1:28	30 Apr 2021	BT Sport Studio, London, England	
16	Win	15–0–1	Harry Scarff	UD	10	15 Aug 2020	BT Sport Studio, London, England	Retained IBF European light-middleweight title
15	Win	14–0–1	Daniel Urbanski	TKO	2 (6), 0:58	29 Feb 2020	Eagles Community Centre, Newcastle, England	
14	Win	13–0–1	Dario Socci	TKO	10 (10), 1:55	21 Dec 2019	Copper Box Arena, London, England	Won vacant IBF European light-middleweight title
13	Win	12–0–1	Ben Douglas	TKO	7 (8), 1:25	12 Oct 2019	First Direct Arena, Leeds, England	
12	Win	11–0–1	Edwin Palacios	TKO	6 (8), 1:07	15 Jun 2019	First Direct Arena, Leeds, England	
11	Win	10–0–1	Ionut Trandafir	RTD	2 (8), 3:00	3 May 2019	Eagles Community Arena, Newcastle, England	
10	Win	9–0–1	Kevin McCauley	KO	2 (8), 2:57	23 Mar 2019	Morningside Arena, Leicester, England	
9	Win	8–0–1	Rafał Jackiewicz	PTS	4	22 Dec 2018	Manchester Arena, Manchester, England	
8	Draw	7–0–1	Jack Flatley	PTS	8	9 Jun 2018	Manchester Arena, Manchester, England	
7	Win	7–0	Michael Mora	TKO	2 (6), 1:10	26 May 2018	Dolphin Centre, Darlington, England	
6	Win	6–0	Christian Hoskin-Gomez	TKO	4 (6), 2:41	21 Apr 2018	SSE Arena, Belfast, Northern Ireland	
5	Win	5–0	Miguel Aguilar	PTS	6	11 Nov 2017	Metro Radio Arena, Newcastle, England	
4	Win	4–0	Alistair Warren	TKO	3 (6), 2:04	16 Jul 2017	Stadium of Light, Sunderland, England	
3	Win	3–0	Casey Blair	TKO	3 (4), 0:48	10 Mar 2017	Waterfront Hall, Belfast, Northern Ireland	
2	Win	2–0	Yailton Neeves	PTS	4	26 Nov 2016	Dolphin Centre, Darlington, England	
1	Win	1–0	Borislav Zankov	KO	3 (4), 1:43	29 Oct 2016	Meadowbank Sports Centre, Edinburgh, Scotland	
