= Lewis Crocker =

Irish boxer (born 1997)

Personal information
- Nickname: The Croc
- Born: 6 January 1997 (age 29) Belfast, Northern Ireland
- Height: 5 ft 9 in (175 cm)
- Weight: Welterweight

Boxing career
- Stance: Orthodox

Boxing record
- Total fights: 23
- Wins: 22
- Win by KO: 11
- Losses: 1
Medal record
Men's Amateur boxing
Representing Northern Ireland
European Schoolboy Championships
Bronze medal – third place	2011 Grozny	59kg

Lewis Crocker (born 6 January 1997) is a Northern Irish professional boxer. He held the IBF welterweight title from 2025 to 2026. He also won the WBO European welterweight title in 2020 and held the WBA Continental European title after defeating Tyrone McKenna in the Battle of Belfast on 2 December 2023.

== Early life and education ==
Born in the Sandy Row area of South Belfast, Lewis Crocker attended secondary school at Malone Integrated College in Finaghy. He initially boxed at Holy Trinity Amateur Boxing Club in West Belfast.

== Amateur career ==
Amateur boxing in both the Republic of Ireland and Northern Ireland is governed by the Irish Amateur Boxing Association. As an amateur, Crocker fought out of the Cairn Lodge Boxing Club in Belfast before eventually moving to Holy Trinity in the west of the city. His first major honour came in July 2011, when he represented Ireland in the European Schoolboy Championships. He earned a bronze medal for his efforts. Overall, Lewis had 97 amateur bouts, winning 90. On the way, he won seven All-Ireland junior titles. He also represented Ireland at the European Youth Championships in Sofia, Bulgaria in 2012 as well as the World Junior Championships in Kyiv, Ukraine in 2013. According to Irish Boxing, he holds the record for the quickest knockout in Irish amateur boxing history at under 12 seconds. He won the 2015 Irish Boxing KO of the year for this effort. In 2018, Lewis won a settlement over the Ulster Boxing Council (UBC). The UBC did not select Lewis to represent Northern Ireland in the 2015 Commonwealth Youth Games despite a recommendation by the Irish Amateur Boxing Association's head coach for Ulster. Lewis believed he was not picked for the NI Commonwealth Youth Games squad because of his Protestant background or perceived unionist political opinions, all others selected were Catholic. He won an £8,500 settlement under fair employment law.

== Professional career ==
Crocker made his professional debut on 10 March 2017, scoring a first-round technical knockout (TKO) victory over Ferenc Jarko at the Waterfront Hall in Belfast.

Crocker faced Paddy Donovan in a final eliminator for the IBF welterweight title on 1 March 2025 at SSE Arena in Belfast, Northern Ireland. Donovan knocked Crocker to the canvas at the end of the eighth round but was disqualified after the referee ruled the bell had gone before the punch was delivered. He had already been deducted points in rounds six and eight for illegal use of the elbow and head. Donovan appealed against his disqualification and on 27 March 2025, the IBF announced it had granted him a rematch.

The rematch on 13 September 2025 at Windsor Park in Belfast for the vacant IBF welterweight title was a much closer bout than the first. Crocker fought more tactically as a counterpuncher, a style by which he dropped Donovan in rounds three and five en route to a split decision victory, winning the IBF welterweight title.

Crocker made the first defense of his title against Liam Paro at Pat Rafter Arena in Tennyson, Queensland, Australia, on 24 June 2026, losing via unanimous decision.

== Professional boxing record ==
23 fights	22 wins	1 loss
By knockout	11	0
By decision	10	1
By disqualification	1	0

No.	Result	Record	Opponent	Type	Round, time	Date	Location	Notes
23	Loss	22–1	Liam Paro	UD	12	24 Jun 2026	Pat Rafter Arena, Tennyson, Queensland, Australia	Lost IBF welterweight title
22	Win	22–0	Paddy Donovan	SD	12	13 Sep 2025	Windsor Park, Belfast, Northern Ireland	Won vacant IBF welterweight title
21	Win	21–0	Paddy Donovan	DQ	8 (12), 3:00	1 Mar 2025	SSE Arena, Belfast, Northern Ireland	Donovan disqualified for flooring Crocker after the bell
20	Win	20–0	Conah Walker	UD	10	22 Jun 2024	Resorts World Arena, Birmingham, England	Won vacant WBA International welterweight title
19	Win	19–0	José Félix Jr.	TKO	5 (10), 1:53	27 Jan 2024	Ulster Hall, Belfast, Northern Ireland	
18	Win	18–0	Tyrone McKenna	UD	10	2 Dec 2023	SSE Arena, Belfast, Northern Ireland	Won vacant WBA Continental (European) Welterweight Title
17	Win	17–0	Greyvin Mendoza	TKO	4 (8), 2:29	4 Aug 2023	Falls Park, Belfast, Northern Ireland	
16	Win	16–0	Octavian Gratii	PTS	6	20 May 2023	DoubleTree Hilton Hotel, Glasgow, Scotland	
15	Win	15–0	Joel Julio	KO	2 (6), 1:59	14 Apr 2023	Glasgow Boxing Academy, Glasgow, Scotland	
14	Win	14–0	Artem Haroyan	TKO	7 (10), 0:47	05 Nov 2021	Ulster Hall, Belfast, Northern Ireland	Retained WBO European welterweight title
13	Win	13–0	Deniz Ilbay	PTS	10	12 Mar 2021	Bolton Whites Hotel, Bolton, England	Retained WBO European welterweight title
12	Win	12–0	Louis Greene	TKO	7 (10), 2:02	26 Aug 2020	Production Park Studios, South Kirkby, England	Won vacant WBO European welterweight title
11	Win	11–0	John Thain	PTS	8	1 Feb 2020	Ulster Hall, Belfast, Northern Ireland	
10	Win	10–0	Ohio Kain Iremiren	PTS	6	11 Oct 2019	Ulster Hall, Belfast, Northern Ireland	
9	Win	9–0	Karim Aliliche	PTS	6	21 Jun 2019	Ulster Hall, Belfast, Northern Ireland	
8	Win	8–0	Jumanne Camero	PTS	6	17 May 2019	Ulster Hall, Belfast, Northern Ireland	
7	Win	7–0	William Warburton	PTS	6	18 Aug 2018	Windsor Park, Belfast, Northern Ireland	
6	Win	6–0	Adam Grabiec	TKO	1 (4), 1:19	30 Jun 2018	SSE Arena, Belfast, Northern Ireland	
5	Win	5–0	Scott James	TKO	3 (4)	21 Apr 2018	SSE Arena, Belfast, Northern Ireland	
4	Win	4–0	Gyula Rozsas	TKO	2 (4), 1:50	18 Nov 2017	SSE Arena, Belfast, Northern Ireland	
3	Win	3–0	Sylwester Walczak	KO	1 (4), 1:47	29 Jul 2017	Tudor Grange Leisure Centre, Solihull, England	
2	Win	2–0	Radoslav Mitev	TKO	2 (4), 2:32	17 Jun 2017	Waterfront Hall, Belfast, Northern Ireland	
1	Win	1–0	Ferenc Jarko	TKO	1 (4), 1:07	10 Mar 2017	Waterfront Hall, Belfast, Northern Ireland	

== See also ==
- List of male boxers
- List of British world boxing champions
- List of world welterweight boxing champions

Sporting positions
Regional boxing titles
Vacant Title last held by Michael McKinson	WBO European welterweight champion August 26, 2020 – 2022; Vacated	Vacant Title next held by Liam Taylor
Vacant Title last held by Conor Benn	WBA Continental welterweight champion December 2, 2023 – 2025; Vacated	Vacant
World boxing titles
Vacant Title last held by Jaron Ennis	IBF welterweight champion September 13, 2025 – June 24, 2026	Succeeded by Liam Paro
