= Katie Taylor vs Chantelle Cameron =

Professional boxing match

Homecoming
- Date: 20 May 2023
- Venue: 3Arena, Dublin, Ireland
- Title(s) on the line: WBA, WBC, IBF, WBO, IBO, and The Ring female light-welterweight titles

Tale of the tape
Boxer	Katie Taylor	Chantelle Cameron
Nickname	KT	Il Capo
Hometown	Bray, Ireland	Northampton, England
Pre-fight record	22–0 (6 KOs)	17–0 (8 KOs)
Height	5 ft 5 in (1.65 m)	5 ft 8 in (1.73 m)
Style	Orthodox	Orthodox
Recognition	Undisputed lightweight champion The Ring No. 1 ranked pound-for-pound fighter 2-division world champion	Undisputed light-welterweight champion

Result
- Cameron defeated Taylor via majority decision (96-94, 96-94, 95-95).

Katie Taylor vs Chantelle Cameron, billed as Homecoming, was a championship professional boxing match contested in the light-welterweight division between undisputed lightweight champion Katie Taylor and undisputed light-welterweight champion Chantelle Cameron. The bout took place on 20 May 2023 at the 3Arena in Dublin, Ireland. Cameron defeated Taylor via majority decision.

== Background ==
On 5 February 2023, it was announced that the rematch between Katie Taylor and Amanda Serrano would take place on 20 May in Dublin, Ireland for the undisputed lightweight championship of the world. However on 28 February, Serrano withdrew due to an injury she had sustained during training camp with an opponent replacement announcement inbound. On 11 March it was announced that the undisputed Light-welterweight champion Chantelle Cameron would replace Serrano as Taylor's opponent and they would now be fighting for the undisputed super lightweight championship at the 3Arena in Dublin, Ireland.

== Fight card ==
Weight class		vs		Method	Round	Time	Notes
Main Card
Light-welterweight	Chantelle Cameron (c)	def.	Katie Taylor	MD	10		^{Note 1}
Lightweight	José Félix Jr.	def.	Gary Cully	TKO	3/10	2:34
Super-welterweight	James Metcalf	def.	Dennis Hogan	UD	12		^{Note 2}
Middleweight	Caoimhin Agyarko	def.	Grant Dennis	UD	10
Heavyweight	Thomas Carty	def.	Jay McFarlane	KO	2/8	2:58	^{Note 3}
Preliminary Card
Welterweight	Paddy Donovan	def.	Sam O'Maison	TKO	6/8	2:13
Flyweight	Maisey Rose Courtney	def.	Kate Radomska	PTS	6

^Note 1 For WBA, WBC, IBF, WBO, IBO, and The Ring female light-welterweight titles
^Note 2 For IBO super-welterweight title
^Note 3 For vacant BUI celtic heavyweight title
