= Sam Gilley =

English boxer (born 1994)

Personal information
- Nickname: Magic Man
- Born: 19 August 1994 (age 31) Leytonstone, London, England
- Height: 6 ft (183 cm)
- Weight: Super-welterweight, Middleweight

Boxing career
- Stance: Orthodox

Boxing record
- Total fights: 22
- Wins: 19
- Win by KO: 10
- Losses: 2
- Draws: 1

Sam Gilley (born 19 August 1994) is an English professional boxer. He is a former Commonwealth and English super-welterweight champion.

== Career ==
Gilley became English super-welterweight champion in 2021 and made two successful defenses of the title.

He challenged Commonwealth super-welterweight champion Louis Greene at York Hall in London on 21 October 2023. Gilley forced his opponent to take a knee following a heavy punch to his body in the fifth round and went on to win the fight by unanimous decision.

In August 2024, Gilley signed a promotional contract with Frank Warren's Queensbury Promotions.

He made the first defense of his Commonwealth title against Jack McGann at York Hall on 18 October 2024. Gilley knocked the challenger to the canvas in round two and clinched the win in the fourth round when a flurry of unanswered blows led the referee to step in and stop the contest.

Gilley was scheduled to defend his Commonwealth title for the second time in a rematch against Louis Greene at Portman Road in Ipswich on 7 June 2025, with the vacant British super-welterweight crown also on the line. However, Greene withdrew after a contract dispute.

He lost his title to Ishmael Davis at Tottenham Hotspur Stadium in London on 15 November 2025, going down by unanimous decision in a contest where the vacant British super-welterweight championship was also on the line.

Moving up in weight divisions to middleweight, Gilley got back to winning ways in his next fight, stopping Aston Brown in the fifth of their scheduled 10-round round bout at the OVO Hydro in Glasgow on 17 April 2026.
