= Reece Farnhill =

English boxer (born 1997)

Personal information
- Born: 20 November 1997 (age 28) Burnley, Lancashire, England
- Height: 5 ft 11 in (180 cm)
- Weight: Super-middleweight

Boxing career
- Stance: Orthodox

Boxing record
- Total fights: 12
- Wins: 11
- Win by KO: 4
- Losses: 1

Reece Farnhill (born 20 November 1997) is an English professional boxer. He is a former English super-middleweight champion.

== Career ==
Fighting out of Sandygate ABC, Farnhill won 40 of his 53 amateur bouts including becoming England Boxing Northern Area champion, before turning professional in September 2020.

He made his pro-debut at Sheffield Arena Car Park on 28 May 2021, defeating Scott Williams on points over four rounds.

Unbeaten in his first 10 fights in the paid ranks, Farnhill faced Ryszard Lewicki for the vacant English super-middleweight title at the Leisure Centre in Oldham on 5 October 2024, winning by split decision.

He lost the title in his first defense via unanimous decision against Mark Dickinson at Planet Ice in Altrincham on 28 March 2025.

== Personal life ==
Before focussing on boxing full-time, Farnhill worked as a welder. He is also a qualified personal trainer.
