= Dario Socci =

Italian boxer (born 1988)

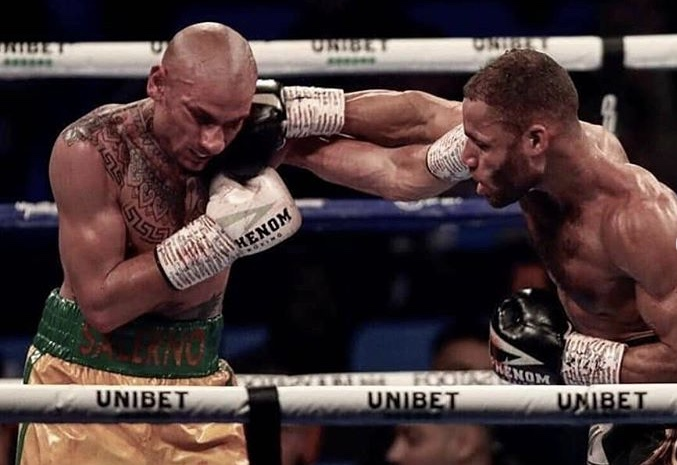

Personal information
- Nickname: The Italian Trouble
- Nationality: Italian
- Born: 13 April 1988 (age 38) Salerno, Italy
- Height: 1.80 m (5 ft 11 in)
- Weight: Welterweight; Light-middleweight; Middleweight
- Website: https://www.dariosocci.com/

Boxing career
- Stance: Orthodox

Boxing record
- Total fights: 25
- Wins: 15
- Win by KO: 6
- Losses: 7
- Draws: 2
- No contests: 1

Dario Socci (born 13 April 1988) is an Italian professional boxer.

== Boxing career ==
=== Amateur boxing career ===
Socci's amateur career in Italy numbers 81 matches fought in different weight categories (from 69 to 75 kg) and eight participations at the Italian Boxing Championships. In 2008 Socci decided to start facing the international world of boxing, moving first in Spain and in 2010 in the United States, where he trained at the Gleason's Gym.

=== Professional boxing career ===
In August 2012 Socci had in Long Islang his first match as a professional boxer in the Super-Welterweight class (won by unanimous decision). After the match, Socci arrived at the Morris Park Boxing Club in the Bronx, under the wing of Aaron "Superman" Davis, former WBA middleweight world champion, Lou "Honey Boy" Del Valle former WBA light heavyweight world champion, and Vincenzo Scardino. After a short time spent in Brazil, he moved to Germany, at ISI Boxing Gym in Berlin, where he stayed for a year and a half. Three major championship wins date back to that period: the GBA German International Superwelterweight Title, the GBU European Welterweight Title and the GBU Continental Middleweight Title.

In 2015 he spent a period of training in Japan, in Tokyo, with Master Sendai Tanaka of Teiken Boxing Gym (in 2018 he returned again to Japan, this time to Osaka, to continue his training at MUTO Boxing Gym). In January 2016, Socci started to train at the Pollex Boxing Team boxing gym with Team Pollex boxers. In the same summer, he began collaborating with the Evolve MMA Fighiting Team (with which he still collaborates) spending about two months of 2016 in Singapore as a sparring partner and technical boxing consultant.

From September 2016 until 2018 Socci settled in Mexico in Guadalajara in the Escuela de Boxeo Canelo Alvarez, with the former WBC featherweight world champion Alejandro "La Cobrita" Gonzalez as trainer. During this period he fought many important matches, including the one for the vacant IBF Welterweight Championship, held in South Africa against Tsiko Mulovhedzi, at the time the World Welterweight Champion for the IBO.

In 2018 he returned to Europe, alternating his trainings between Peacock Gym in London, Morris Park in New York, Fortitudo Boxe in Rome, and the Pugilistica Salernitana in his hometown.

On 21 December 2019 at the event organized by Frank Warren at the Copper Boxe Arena in London, he suffered a technical knockout defeat at 01:55 of the last round against the British boxer Troy Williamson, a bout valid for the vacant IBF European Super Welter title

== Boxing records ==
=== Titles ===
- 2014 Champion GBA German International Super Welterweight Title
- 2015 Champion GBU European Welterweight Title
- 2015 Champion GBU Continental Middleweight Title
- 2021 Champion UBC International Middleweight Title

=== Professional record ===
- Wins: 15
- Wins K.O.: 6
- Defeats: 7
- Defeats K.O.: 1 (TKO)
- Draws: 2
- No-Contest: 1
- Total matches: 25
- Rounds: 166
- KOs: 24%
