= Paddy Donovan (Irish boxer) =

Irish boxer (born 1999)

Personal information
- Nickname: The Real Deal
- Born: Patrick Donovan; 10 January 1999 (age 27) County Limerick, Ireland
- Height: 5 ft 9 in (175 cm)
- Weight: Welterweight

Boxing career
- Stance: Southpaw

Boxing record
- Total fights: 18
- Wins: 16
- Win by KO: 12
- Losses: 2

Patrick Donovan (born 10 January 1999) is an Irish professional boxer.

As an amateur, Donovan competed at the 2016 World Youth Championships.

== Professional career ==
On 20 June 2019, it was announced that Donovan had signed a contract to fight professionally with Top Rank where he would be promoted by Bob Arum. Donovan made his professional debut on 11 October 2019 against Arturo Lopez. In the opening round, Donovan landed a clean left hand which put his opponent on the canvas. Donovan was declared the winner by knockout after Lopez failed to beat the count.

Donovan fought Danny Mendoza on 16 November 2019. In the opening moments of the second round, Donovan connected with a sharp left hand which resulted in his opponent receiving a standing count. Donovan continued to control the remainder of the bout and sealed the win after winning every round on the referees scored card. On 20 December 2019, Donovan faced Oscar Amador. Donovan dominated the opening two rounds, consistently landing to both the head and body. In the third round, Donovan connected with a powerful left hand which knocked his opponent down. Donovan secured the win after Amador was unable to recover from the knockdown.

On 15 August 2020, Donovan fought against Des Newton. Donovan dropped his opponent with a left hook in the opening moments of the first round. Newton recovered from the knockdown, however, Donovan proceeded to land a powerful right uppercut to the body which knocked his opponent down for a second time. Following the second knockdown, the referee called an end to the bout. On 11 November 2020, Donovan faced Jumaane Camero. Donovan won via points decision after outboxing his opponent throughout the duration of the bout.

Donovan fought Siar Ozgul on 19 February 2021. In the opening rounds, Donovan succeeded in landing a number of uppercuts against his shorter opponent. In the fourth round, Donovan appeared to hurt Ozgul after connecting with a powerful left hook. At the end of the fourth round, Ozgul's corner opted to retire their fighter after he sustained large amounts of damage. On 6 August 2021, Donovan fought Jose Luis Castillo. In the first round, Donovan knocked his opponent down after landing a heavy left hook to the body of Castillo. The referee called an end to the bout after Castillo was unable to beat the count.

On 26 February 2022, Donovan fought on the undercard of Josh Taylor vs. Jack Catterall, in a bout against Miroslav Serban. Donovan won via technical knockout in the sixth round after the referee called an end to the bout following an injury to Serban's left ear. Donovan faced Tom Hill on 6 August 2022. Donovan controlled the bout from the outset and was declared the winner via wide points decision after winning every round of the bout on the referees scorecard.

Donovan stopped former British lightweight champion Lewis Ritson in the ninth of their scheduled 10-round contest at First Direct Arena in Leeds, England, on 25 May 2024.

He faced Lewis Crocker in a final eliminator for the IBF welterweight title at SSE Arena in Belfast, Northern Ireland, on 1 March 2025. Donovan knocked Crocker to the canvas at the end of the eighth round but was disqualified after the referee ruled the bell had gone before the punch was delivered. He had already been deducted points in rounds six and eight for illegal use of the elbow and head. Donovan appealed against his disqualification and on 27 March 2025, the IBF announced it had granted him a rematch. The rematch took place on 13 September 2025 at Windsor Park in Belfast for the vacant IBF welterweight title. In a much closer bout than the first, Donovan was knocked down in rounds three and five, losing a split decision,

Donovan faced Karen Chukhadzhian in an IBF welterweight title eliminator at SAP-Arena in Mannheim, Germany on 15 May 2026. He knocked his opponent to the canvas twice and won via majority decision with the judges' scorecards reading 115–111, 114–112 and 113–113.

Donovan fought Tyrone McKenna at Croke Park in Dublin on 5 September 2026. He won by technical knockout when the fight was stopped in the fourth round on the advice of the ringside doctor due to a severe cut above his opponent's right eye.

== Professional boxing record ==
18 fights	16 wins	2 losses
By knockout	12	0
By decision	4	1
By disqualification	0	1

No.	Result	Record	Opponent	Type	Round, time	Date	Location	Notes
18	Win	16–2	Tyrone McKenna	TKO	4 (12), 2:33	5 Sep 2026	Croke Park, Dublin, Ireland	
17	Win	15–2	Karen Chukhadzhian	MD	12	15 May 2026	SAP-Arena, Mannheim, Germany	
16	Loss	14–2	Lewis Crocker	SD	12	13 Sep 2025	Windsor Park, Belfast, Northern Ireland	For vacant IBF welterweight title
15	Loss	14–1	Lewis Crocker	DQ	8 (12), 3:00	1 Mar 2025	SSE Arena, Belfast, Northern Ireland	Donovan disqualified for punching after the bell
14	Win	14–0	Lewis Ritson	TKO	9 (10), 0:32	25 May 2024	First Direct Arena, Leeds, England	
13	Win	13–0	Williams Andres Herrera	TKO	7 (10), 1:44	27 Jan 2024	Ulster Hall, Belfast, Northern Ireland	
12	Win	12–0	Danny Ball	TKO	4 (10), 2:41	25 Nov 2023	3Arena, Dublin, Ireland	
11	Win	11–0	Sam O'maison	TKO	6 (8), 2:13	20 May 2023	3Arena, Dublin, Ireland	
10	Win	10–0	Luis Eduardo Souza	TKO	1 (8), 2:50	1 Apr 2023	National Stadium, Dublin, Ireland	
9	Win	9–0	Tom Hill	PTS	8	6 Aug 2022	SSE Arena, Belfast, Northern Ireland	
8	Win	8–0	Miroslav Serban	TKO	6 (6), 0:56	26 Feb 2022	OVO Hydro, Glasgow, Scotland	
7	Win	7–0	Jose Luis Castillo	KO	1 (6), 1:22	6 Aug 2021	Falls Park, Belfast, Northern Ireland	
6	Win	6–0	Siar Ozgul	RTD	4 (6), 3:00	19 Feb 2021	Bolton Whites Hotel, Bolton, England	
5	Win	5–0	Jumaane Camero	PTS	6	11 Nov 2020	Production Park Studios, South Kirkby, England	
4	Win	4–0	Des Newton	TKO	1 (6), 1:31	15 Aug 2020	York Hall, London, England	
3	Win	3–0	Oscar Amador	KO	3 (6), 2:09	20 Dec 2019	Bolton Whites Hotel, Bolton, England	
2	Win	2–0	Danny Mendoza	PTS	6	16 Nov 2019	Emirates Arena, Glasgow, Scotland	
1	Win	1–0	Arturo Lopez	KO	1 (6), 1:16	11 Oct 2019	Ulster Hall, Belfast, Northern Ireland	
