= Ivan Zucco =

Italian boxer (born 1995)

Personal information
- Born: 11 October 1995 (age 30) Verbania, Piedmont, Italy
- Height: 6 ft (183 cm)
- Weight: Super-middleweight

Boxing career
- Stance: Southpaw

Boxing record
- Total fights: 23
- Wins: 22
- Win by KO: 19
- Losses: 1

Ivan Zucco (born 11 October 1995) is an Italian professional boxer who is a former WBC International super-middleweight champion. He has also held the Italian super-middleweight title and challenged for the European title in the same weight division.

== Career ==
Unbeaten in his first 12 professional fights, Zucco won the vacant Italian super-middleweight title when his opponent, Luca Capuano, retired on his stool at the end of the sixth round of their bout at the Allianz Cloud Arena in Milan on 16 April 2021.

He successfully defended the title by stopping Ignazio Crivello in the third of their scheduled 10-round contest at Centro Eventi Il Maggiore in Verbania on 28 July 2021.

Zucco fought Marko Nikolic for the vacant WBC International super-middleweight title at Palazzo Dello Sport in Verbania on 22 April 2022. He won by stoppage in the second round.

Back at the Allianz Cloud Arena in Milan, he made a successful defense of his title against British boxer Germaine Brown on 24 March 2023, winning the fight via unanimous decision.

Zucco faced Callum Simpson for the vacant European super-middleweight title at Oakwell in Barnsley, England, on 7 June 2025. He knocked his opponent to the canvas in the first and third rounds, but lost by stoppage when he was felled three times in the 10th round.
