= Mark Dickinson =

English boxer (born 1999)

Personal information
- Nickname: Boo Boo
- Born: 7 July 1999 (age 27) Durham, County Durham, England
- Height: 1.88 m (6 ft 2 in)
- Weight: Super-middleweight

Boxing career

Boxing record
- Total fights: 10
- Wins: 8
- Win by KO: 2
- Losses: 2

Mark Dickinson (born 7 July 1999) is an English professional boxer. As an amateur he won gold medals at the 2017 European Youth Championships and 2017 Commonwealth Youth Games.

He competed at the 2019 European Games in Minsk, Belarus, and also at the 2019 World Championships in Yekaterinburg, Russia, where he lost by unanimous decision to Arman Darchinyan in the first round.

Dickinson turned professional in January 2021. He won the English super-middleweight title with a unanimous decision victory over defending champion Reece Farnhill at Planet Ice in Altrincham on 28 March 2025. Dickinson was stripped of the title after failing to make the required weight before his first defense against Troy Williamson at Rainton Meadows Arena in Houghton-le-Spring on 6 September 2025. Despite this the fight went ahead with Williamson winning by stoppage in the ninth round.
