= Callum Simpson (boxer) =

British boxer (born 1996)

Personal information
- Born: 16 October 1996 (age 29) Barnsley, South Yorkshire, England.
- Height: 6 ft 3 in (191 cm)
- Weight: Super middleweight

Boxing career
- Reach: 75 in (191 cm)
- Stance: Orthodox

Boxing record
- Total fights: 20
- Wins: 19
- Win by KO: 13
- Losses: 1

Callum Simpson (born 16 October 1996) is a British professional boxer. He is a two-time British and Commonwealth super-middleweight champion and former European super-middleweight title holder.

== Early life ==
Callum Simpson was born in 1996 in Barnsley, South Yorkshire. He attended Longcar Primary School and Horizon Community College, both in Barnsley.

Before taking up boxing, Simpson played association football for Dodworth Miner's Welfare F.C. in the Sheffield & Hallamshire County Senior League; his father served as the club's manager.

According to the Barnsley Chronicle, he began boxing at the age of eight at a gym in Bolton upon Dearne, later training at Barnsley Star Boxing Club under coach Trevor Schofield.

A YouTube interview reported that Simpson had 53 amateur fights, winning 38, before turning professional in 2019.

== Professional career ==
Simpson made his professional debut in 2019 against seasoned journeyman Elvis Dube at Doncaster Racecourse, winning a points decision.

In October of the same year, Simpson faced and beat Kiril Psonko. A month later, he beat Richard Harrison via technical knockout at the Metrodome, Barnsley.

Simpson had two fights in 2021, the first in October against Lewis van Poetsch. The second in December versus Antony Woolery, winning both via technical knockout.

In 2022, Simpson was scheduled to fight Michael Osmanu Osunla. However, when the bout began, it was visibly noted that the opponent shared no resemblance to Osunla. Simpson continued to win the fight via knockout. But an investigation was opened to uncover the identity of the imposter fighter.

Simpson won his first title by stopping Ben Ridings in the second round to claim the Central Area super-middleweight title at the Leisure Centre in Oldham on 1 October 2022.

In February 2023, Simpson signed an exclusive promotional agreement with Boxxer. Simpson made his Boxxer debut in March 2023 against Celso Neves, winning via technical knockout. In July, he beat Boris Crighton via unanimous decision. His third fight of the year came against Jose de Jesus Macias, with Simpson winning via unanimous decision after scoring a knockdown in the eighth round.

In 2024, on the undercard of Fabio Wardley vs. Frazer Clarke at the O2 Arena in London, Simpson successfully defended his title against Dulla Mbabe, winning via knockout in round four.

Simpson won the British and Commonwealth super-middleweight titles against champion Zak Chelli on 3 August 2024 in Barnsley at Simpson's childhood football club Barnsley F.C.'s stadium Oakwell. The fight, billed as Battle Lines, was won by Simpson via unanimous decision.

He made a successful first defense of his titles by stopping Steed Woodall in round two of their bout at Park Community Arena in Sheffield on 11 January 2025. Three weeks later, on 1 February 2025, he defended his Commonwealth title against Ghanaian boxer Elvis Ahorgah at Wembley Arena in London, stopping his opponent in the fifth round.

Simpson faced Ivan Zucco for the vacant European super-middleweight title at Oakwell in Barnsley on 7 June 2025. He was knocked to the canvas in the first and third rounds, but recovered to win by stoppage when he felled his opponent three times in the 10th round.

Simpson put his European, British and Commonwealth super-middleweight titles up for grabs against Troy Williamson at First Direct Arena in Leeds on 20 December 2025. He was sent to the canvas four times in the 10th round and lost via technical knockout when the referee waived the fight off following the fourth knock down. A rematch was scheduled to take place at the same venue on 8 August 2026 although only the British and Commonwealth titles were at stake as Williamson had relinquished the European belt. Simpson won by unanimous decision.

== Personal life ==
Simpson has one older brother, Bradley, a professional model, and one older sister. His younger sister, Lily-Rae Simpson, died at 19 in a road accident in Greece in August 2024.

Simpson now trains at Dicky's Gym in Batley, the former gym of IBF featherweight champion Josh Warrington.

He is a lifelong fan of Barnsley F.C. and is outspoken about his Yorkshire roots.

In May 2025, Simpson partnered with The Trussell Trust to launch the Fight Against Hunger campaign with the aim of raising £15,000 for the Barnsley Foodbank.

== Professional boxing record ==
| 20 fights | 19 wins | 1 loss |
|---|---|---|
| By knockout | 13 | 1 |
| By decision | 6 | 0 |

Key to abbreviations used for results
| DQ | Disqualification | RTD | Corner retirement |
| KO | Knockout | SD | Split decision / split draw |
| MD | Majority decision / majority draw | TD | Technical decision / technical draw |
| NC | No contest | TKO | Technical knockout |
| PTS | Points decision | UD | Unanimous decision / unanimous draw |

Boxing record
| No. | Result | Record | Opponent | Type | Round(s), time | Date | Location | Notes |
|---|---|---|---|---|---|---|---|---|
| 20 | Win | 19–1 | Troy Williamson | UD | 12 | 8 Aug 2026 | First Direct Arena, Leeds, England | Won British and Commonwealth super-middleweight titles |
| 19 | Loss | 18–1 | Troy Williamson | TKO | 10 (12), 2:21 | 20 Dec 2025 | First Direct Arena, Leeds, England | Lost British, European and Commonwealth super-middleweight titles |
| 18 | Win | 18–0 | Ivan Zucco | TKO | 10 (12), 2:28 | 7 Jun 2025 | Oakwell, Barnsley, England | Won vacant European super middleweight title |
| 17 | Win | 17–0 | Elvis Ahorgah | TKO | 5 (12), 1:53 | 1 Feb 2025 | Wembley Arena, London, England | Retained Commonwealth super middleweight title |
| 16 | Win | 16–0 | Steed Woodall | KO | 2 (12), 1:56 | 11 Jan 2025 | Park Community Arena, Sheffield, England | Retained British and Commonwealth super middleweight titles; won WBO Inter-Continental super middleweight title |
| 15 | Win | 15–0 | Zak Chelli | UD | 12 | 3 Aug 2024 | Oakwell, Barnsley, England | Won British and Commonwealth super middleweight titles |
| 14 | Win | 14–0 | Dulla Mbabe | KO | 4 (10), 1:10 | 31 Mar 2024 | The O2 Arena, London, England | |
| 13 | Win | 13–0 | Jose de Jesus Macias | UD | 10 | 30 Sep 2023 | York Hall, London, England | |
| 12 | Win | 12–0 | Boris Crighton | UD | 10 | 1 Jul 2023 | Manchester Arena, Manchester, England | |
| 11 | Win | 11–0 | Celso Neves | TKO | 3 (8), 1:36 | 25 Mar 2023 | Manchester Arena, Manchester, England | |
| 10 | Win | 10–0 | Ben Ridings | TKO | 2 (10), 1:59 | 1 Oct 2022 | Oldham Leisure Centre, Oldham, England | Won vacant Central Area super middleweight title |
| 9 | Win | 9–0 | Farouk Daku | TKO | 1 (6), 1:16 | 2 Jul 2022 | Metrodome, Barnsley, England | |
| 8 | Win | 8–0 | Michał Łoniewski | TKO | 1 (6), 2:49 | 30 Apr 2022 | Bolton Whites Hotel (De Vere Whites), Bolton, England | |
| 7 | Win | 7–0 | Michal Gazdik | TKO | 1 (6), 1:10 | 9 Apr 2022 | Oldham Leisure Centre, Oldham, England | |
| 6 | Win | 6–0 | Unknown | KO | 1 (6), 3:00 | 26 Feb 2022 | Royal Armouries Museum, Leeds, England | Michael Osmanu Osunla scheduled but not present, investigation is open |
| 5 | Win | 5–0 | Antony Woolery | TKO | 3 (4), 0:50 | 17 Dec 2021 | Ponds Forge Arena, Sheffield, England | |
| 4 | Win | 4–0 | Lewis van Poetsch | TKO | 3 (4), 1:32 | 16 Oct 2021 | Oldham Leisure Centre, Oldham, England | |
| 3 | Win | 3–0 | Richard Harrison | TKO | 1 (4), 2:26 | 23 Nov 2019 | Metrodome, Barnsley, England | |
| 2 | Win | 2–0 | Kiril Psonko | UD | 4 | 12 Oct 2019 | First Direct Arena, Leeds, England | |
| 1 | Win | 1–0 | Elvis Dube | UD | 4 | 22 Jun 2019 | Doncaster Racecourse, Doncaster, England | |
