= Caoimhín Agyarko =

Irish boxer (born 1996)

Caoimhin Agyarko
Personal information
- Nickname: Black Thunder
- Nationality: Irish
- Born: November 29, 1996 (age 29) London, England
- Height: 1.70 m (5 ft 7 in)
- Weight: Middleweight, Super-welterweight

Boxing career
- Stance: Orthodox

Boxing record
- Total fights: 19
- Wins: 18
- Win by KO: 7
- Losses: 1

Caoimhín Agyarko Hynes (born 29 November 1996) is an Irish professional boxer. He challenged for the IBF super-welterweight title in 2026. At regional level, he held the WBA International middleweight title in 2021 and the WBA International super-welterweight title in 2022. Agyarko also held the WBA Continental super-welterweight from 2023 to 2025.

== Early and personal life ==
Agyarko was born in Croydon, England, and moved to Belfast, Northern Ireland when he was seven. His mother's side of the family is from Turf Lodge, Belfast, while his father is from Ghana. Agyarko fought at Holy Trinity Boxing Club in Belfast as an amateur.

In 2017, at age 20, Agyarko was attacked by a gang in Belfast. He was hospitalised with a gash down the side of his face and neck that was life-threatening.

== Professional boxing career ==
Agyarko made his professional debut at Brentwood Centre in Brentwood, Essex, England, on 20 October 2018, defeating Ladislav Nemeth on points over six rounds.

Signed with Eddie Hearn's Matchroom Boxing and in his 10th professional fight, he won the vacant WBA International middleweight title by stopping Noe Larios Jr in the ninth round at the Echo Arena in Liverpool, England, on 11 December 2021.

Agyarko successfully defended the title with a unanimous decision win over Juan Carlos Rubio at Nottingham Arena in Nottingham, England, on 12 March 2022.

On 9 July 2022, he moved up weight divisions to super-welterweight and defeated Lukasz Maciec via unanimous decision to win the vacant WBA International title at The O2 Arena in London, England.

He faced Troy Williamson for the vacant WBA Continental super-welterweight title at the SSE Arena in Belfast, Northern Ireland, on 2 December 2023. Agyarko won by split decision with two of the ringside judges scoring the bout in his favour 98–92 and 97–93 respectively and the third having it 96–94 for his opponent.

On 13 September 2025, he made the first defense of his title against Ishmael Davis at Windsor Park in Belfast, Northern Ireland. Despite being knocked to the canvas in the 12th round, Agyarko won by split decision with two judges favouring him by a score of 114–113, while the third preferred his challenger 115–112.

Agyarko was scheduled to face Brandon Adams in an eliminator for a shot at the IBF super-welterweight title at the Toyota Arena in Ontario, California, USA, on 18 April 2026. The fight was cancelled after Adams collapsed in his hotel room and was taken to hospital before the weigh-in.

He challenged IBF super-welterweight champion Josh Kelly at Jeddah Super Dome in Jeddah, Saudi Arabia, on 25 July 2026, losing by unanimous decision.

== Professional boxing record ==
19 fights	18 wins	1 loss
By knockout	7	0
By decision	11	1

No.	Result	Record	Opponent	Type	Round, time	Date	Location	Notes
19	Loss	18–1	Josh Kelly	UD	12	13 Sep 2025	Jeddah Super Dome, Jeddah, Saudi Arabia	For IBF super-welterweight title
18	Win	18–0	Ishmael Davis	SD	12	13 Sep 2025	Windsor Park, Belfast, Northern Ireland, UK	Retained WBA Continental super-welterweight title
78	Win	17–0	Ryan Kelly	MD	10	4 Apr 2025	Park Community Arena, Sheffield, England, UK	
16	Win	16–0	Harley Collison	PTS	8	30 Mar 2025	York Hall, London, England, UK	
15	Win	15–0	Bahadur Karami	PTS	8	3 Aug 2024	SSE Arena, Belfast, Northern Ireland, UK	
14	Win	14–0	Troy Williamson	SD	10	2 Dec 2023	SSE Arena, Belfast, Northern Ireland, UK	Won vacant WBA Continental super-welterweight title
13	Win	13–0	Grant Dennis	UD	10	20 May 2023	3Arena, Dublin, Ireland	
12	Win	12–0	Lukasz Maciec	UD	10	9 Jul 2022	O2 Arena, Greenwich, England, UK	Won vacant WBA International super-welterweight title
11	Win	11–0	Juan Carlos Rubio	UD	10	12 Mar 2022	Nottingham Arena, Nottingham, England, UK	Retained WBA International middleweight title
10	Win	10–0	Noe Larios Jr	TKO	9 (10), 2:08	11 Dec 2021	Echo Arena, Liverpool, England, UK	Won vacant WBA International middleweight title
9	Win	9–0	Ernesto Olvera	RTD	3 (8), 3:00	5 Jun 2021	Telford International Centre, Telford, England, UK	
8	Win	8–0	Robbie Chapman	TKO	7 (10), 0:33	13 Nov 2020	BT Sport Studio, London, England, UK	
7	Win	7–0	Jez Smith	TKO	9 (10), 0:47	31 Jul 2020	BT Sport Studio, London, England, UK	
6	Win	6–0	Danail Stoyanov	RTD	3 (6), 3:00	14 Dec 2019	York Hall, London, England, UK	
5	Win	5–0	Nelson Altamirano	UD	3 (8), 2:53	14 Sep 2019	York Hall, London, England, UK	
4	Win	4–0	Paul Allison	PTS	6	21 Jun 2019	Ulster Hall, Belfast, Northern Ireland, UK	
3	Win	3–0	Martin Kabrhel	TKO	3 (6), 1:20	27 Apr 2019	Wembley Arena, London, England, UK	
2	Win	2–0	Yasin Hassani	PTS	6	15 Dec 2018	Brentwood Centre, Brentwood, England, UK	
1	Win	1–0	Ladislav Nemeth	PTS	6	20 Oct 2018	Brentwood Centre, Brentwood, England, UK	
