= Josh Kelly (boxer) =

British boxer (born 1994)

Personal information
- Nickname: Pretty Boy
- Born: Joshua Kelly; 7 March 1994 (age 32) Sunderland, England
- Height: 5 ft 10 in (178 cm)
- Weight: Welterweight; Light middleweight

Boxing career
- Reach: 72 in (183 cm)
- Stance: Orthodox

Boxing record
- Total fights: 21
- Wins: 19
- Win by KO: 9
- Losses: 1
- Draws: 1
Medal record
Men's Amateur boxing
Representing United Kingdom
European Games
Bronze medal – third place	2015 Baku	Welterweight

Joshua Kelly (born 7 March 1994) is an English professional boxer. He has held the IBF light-middleweight title since January 2026. He is a former British light-middleweight and Commonwealth welterweight title holder. As an amateur, he competed in the men's welterweight event at the 2016 Summer Olympics and the 2015 European Games, in which he won a bronze medal.

== Amateur career ==
Representing Great Britain, Kelly won a bronze medal in the 69 kg category at the 2015 European Games in Azerbaijan, losing in the semi-finals to the host nation's eventual champion Parviz Baghirov.

The following year he was selected for the Rio Olympics, where he lost in the round-of-16 to Kazakhstan's Daniyar Yeleussinov who went on to win the gold medal.

== Professional career ==
Kelly's first fight as a professional was a six rounds points victory (59–55) against Jay Byrne (4–1) of Dublin in April 2017 at the SSE Hydro in Glasgow on the undercard of Ricky Burns vs. Julius Indongo.

Kelly won his next two fights in the next two months, defeating Spain's Jony Vila (6–1) and Gateshead's Tom Whitfield (4–1) by fourth-round stoppage and first-round knockout respectively. The Vila fight took place at the Barclaycard Arena, Birmingham in May whilst the Whitfield fight took place at the Walker Activity Dome, Newcastle in June, with his fight being the main event.

Kelly finished the year with a record of 5–0 after victories over Mexico's Jose Luis Zuniga (13–2–1) and France's Jean Michel Hamilcaro (25–8–3), winning by second-round stoppage and sixth-round stoppage respectively in October and December. Those fights took place at the SSE Arena, Belfast and the York Hall, London.

=== Kelly vs. Robinson ===
On June 1, 2019, Kelly fought Ray Robinson, who was ranked #13 by the WBC and #15 by the WBO at welterweight. Kelly was ranked #9 by the WBA at welterweight. The contest was even and ended up in a majority draw, with one scorecard going in favour of Kelly, 96–94, while the other two read 95–95 twice.

=== Kelly vs. Campos ===
In his next fight, Kelly fought Wiston Campos. Kelly won the bout via unanimous decision. The scorecards read 99–90, 99–90 and 98–91.

=== Kelly vs. Avanesyan ===
In his next fight, Kelly fought highly ranked welterweight and reigning European Champion David Avanesyan, who was ranked #6 by the IBF, #7 by the WBC, #9 by the WBA and #10 by the WBO at the time. Avanesyan showed to be the better man on the night and finished Kelly within six rounds.

=== Kelly vs. Williamson ===
Kelly won the British light-middleweight title by beating defending champion Troy Williamson by unanimous decision at Newcastle Arena on 2 December 2022.

=== Kelly vs. Davis ===
Kelly was scheduled to face Liam Smith at Wembley Stadium in London, England on 21 September 2024. On 13 September 2024 it was reported that the latter withdrew due to illness. On 16 September 2024 it was announced that Smith was replaced by Ishmael Davis. Kelly won by majority decision winning the two judges awarding the fight to him and the third scoring it as a draw.

=== Kelly vs. Biea ===
At Newcastle Arena on 6 June 2025, he defeated Flavius Biea by first-round stoppage. Kelly knocked his opponent to the canvas and, although Biea got back to his feet, the referee decided he was not fit to continue and waved off the contest.

=== Kelly vs. Murtazaliev ===
Kelly challenged IBF light-middleweight champion Bakhram Murtazaliev at Newcastle Arena on 31 January 2026. Throughout the fight, Kelly fought off of the backfoot, scoring countershots as Murtazaliev attempted to pressure him and force him against the ropes with hard shots. In the fourth round, Kelly scored a knockdown, while Murtazaliev returned the favor in the ninth. After 12 rounds, Kelly won the world title via majority decision, with judges scorecards of 115–111, 114–113, and the third scoring it a 113–113 draw, thus becoming the first boxer from Sunderland to become a world champion.

=== Kelly vs. Agyarko ===
Kelly made the first defense of his title against Caoimhín Agyarko at Jeddah Super Dome in Jeddah, Saudi Arabia, on 25 July 2026, winning by unanimous decision.

== Professional boxing record ==
21 fights	19 wins	1 loss
By knockout	9	1
By decision	10	0
Draws	1	

No.	Result	Record	Opponent	Type	Round, time	Date	Location	Notes
21	Win	19–1–1	Caoimhín Agyarko	UD	12	25 Jul 2026	Jeddah Super Dome, Jeddah, Saudi Arabia	Retained IBF light-middleweight title
20	Win	18–1–1	Bakhram Murtazaliev	MD	12	31 Jan 2026	Newcastle Arena, Newcastle, England	Won IBF light-middleweight title
19	Win	17–1–1	Flavius Biea	KO	1 (10), 2:03	6 Jun 2025	Newcastle Arena, Newcastle, England	
18	Win	16–1–1	Ishmael Davis	MD	12	21 Sep 2024	Wembley Stadium, London, England	
17	Win	15–1–1	Placido Ramirez	KO	3 (12), 2:38	16 Dec 2023	Beacon of Light, Sunderland, England	
16	Win	14–1–1	Gabriel Alberto Corzo	UD	12	15 Jul 2023	Vertu Motors Arena, Newcastle, England	Retained WBO International light-middleweight title
15	Win	13–1–1	Troy Williamson	UD	12	2 Dec 2022	Newcastle Arena, Newcastle, England	Won British light-middleweight title
14	Win	12–1–1	Lucas Bastida	UD	10	30 Jul 2022	Vertu Motors Arena, Newcastle, England	Won vacant WBO International light-middleweight title
13	Win	11–1–1	Peter Kramer	TKO	4 (10), 2:31	17 Jun 2022	Liverpool Arena, Liverpool, England	
12	Loss	10–1–1	David Avanesyan	TKO	6 (12), 2:15	20 Feb 2021	The SSE Arena, London, England	For European welterweight title
11	Win	10–0–1	Wiston Campos	UD	10	20 Dec 2019	Talking Stick Resort Arena, Phoenix, Arizona, U.S.	
10	Draw	9–0–1	Ray Robinson	MD	10	1 Jun 2019	Madison Square Garden, New York City, New York, US	Retained WBA International welterweight title
9	Win	9–0	Przemyslaw Runowski	UD	10	20 Apr 2019	The O2 Arena, London, England	Retained WBA International welterweight title
8	Win	8–0	Walter Fabian Castillo	TKO	1 (10), 2:55	10 Nov 2018	Manchester Arena, Manchester, England	
7	Win	7–0	Kris George	RTD	7 (12), 3:00	16 Jun 2018	Metro Radio Arena, Newcastle, England	Retained WBA International welterweight title; Won Commonwealth welterweight title
6	Win	6–0	Carlos Molina	UD	10	31 Mar 2018	Principality Stadium, Cardiff, Wales	Won vacant WBA International welterweight title
5	Win	5–0	Jean Michel Hamilcaro	TKO	6 (10), 2:06	13 Dec 2017	York Hall, London, England	
4	Win	4–0	Jose Luis Zuniga	TKO	2 (6), 1:41	21 Oct 2017	SSE Arena, Belfast, Northern Ireland	
3	Win	3–0	Tom Whitfield	KO	1 (8), 1:19	23 Jun 2017	Walker Activity Dome, Newcastle, England	
2	Win	2–0	Jony Vina	TKO	4 (6), 1:27	13 May 2017	Barclaycard Arena, Birmingham, England	
1	Win	1–0	Jay Byrne	PTS	6	15 Apr 2017	The SSE Hydro, Glasgow, Scotland	

== See also ==
- List of male boxers
- List of British world boxing champions
- List of world light-middleweight boxing champions

Sporting positions
Regional boxing titles
Vacant Title last held by Sadam Ali	WBA International welterweight champion 31 March 2018 – 2019; Vacated	Vacant Title next held by Karen Chukhadzhian
Preceded by Kris George	Commonwealth welterweight champion 16 June 2018 – 2019; Vacated	Vacant Title next held by Chris Jenkins
Vacant Title last held by Magomed Kurbanov	WBO International light-middleweight champion 30 July 2022 – 31 January 2026; Won world title	Vacant
Vacant Title last held by Troy Williamson	British light-middleweight champion 2 December 2022 – 2023; Vacated	Vacant Title next held by Samuel Antwi
World boxing titles
Preceded by Bakhram Murtazaliev	IBF light-middleweight champion 31 January 2026 – present	Incumbent
