= Oakwell =

Stadium and sport complex in Barnsley, South Yorkshire, England

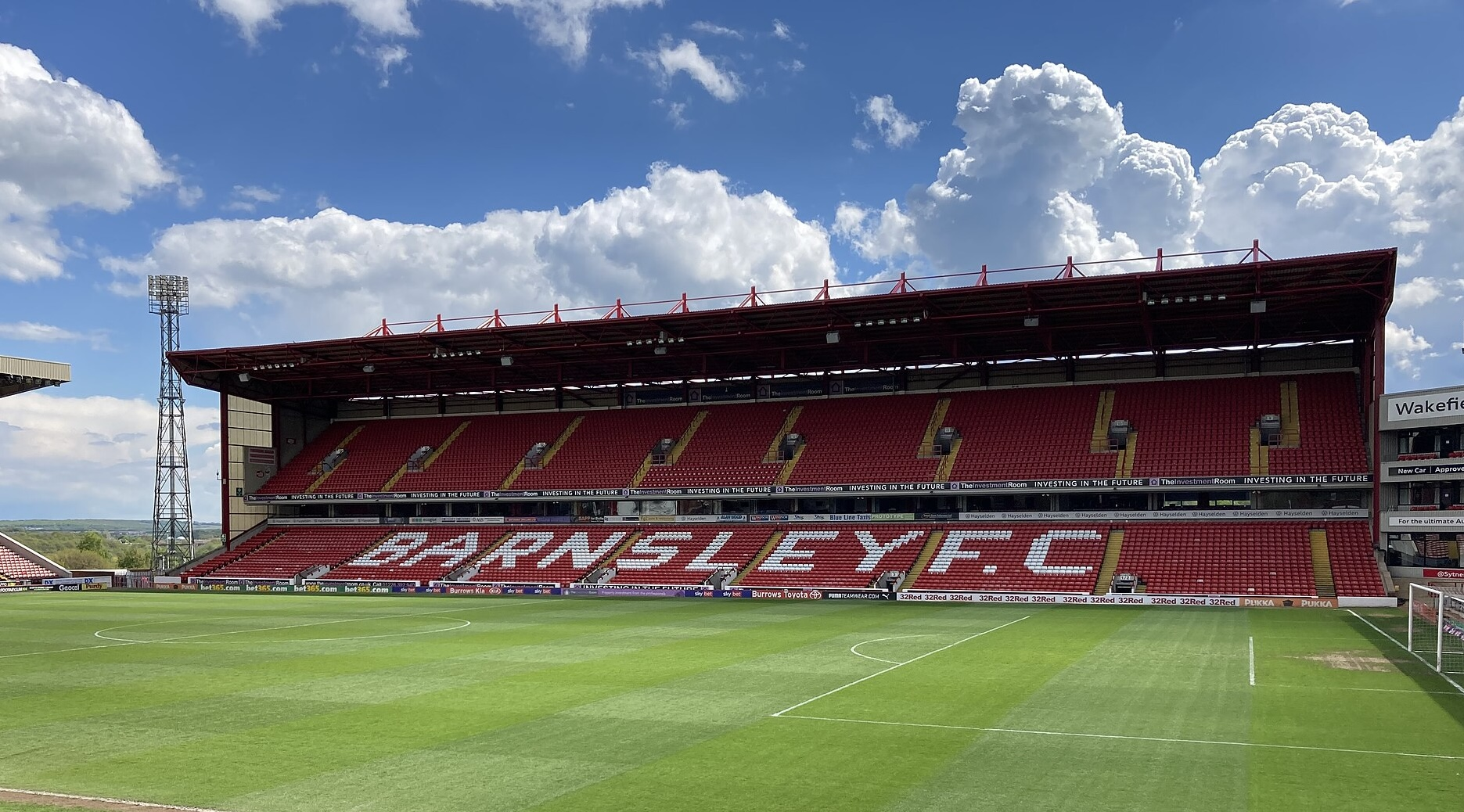
- A view from inside the stadium
- Interactive map of Oakwell
- Full name: Oakwell Stadium
- Location: Grove Street; Barnsley, South Yorkshire; S71 1ET
- Coordinates: 53°33′8″N 1°28′3″W
- Owner: Barnsley Metropolitan Borough Council
- Operator: Barnsley F.C.
- Capacity: 23,287
- Surface: Grass
- Record attendance: 40,225 (Barnsley vs Stoke City, 15 February 1936)
- Field size: 110 x 75 yards

Construction
- Built: 1887
- Opened: 1888
- Renovated: 1992–1999

Tenant
- Barnsley (1887–present)

Oakwell is a multi-purpose sports ground in Barnsley, South Yorkshire, England used by Barnsley Football Club for home fixtures, and those of their reserves. From 2023, the Barnsley F.C. Women's team also played at the stadium until the club withdrew them from the 2025/26 season.

While the name generally refers to the main stadium, it also includes several neighbouring venues which form the facilities of the Barnsley FC Academy, an indoor training pitch, a smaller stadium with seating on the south and west sides for around 2,200 spectators, and several training pitches used by the different Barnsley FC squads.

Oakwell was the first stadium in English football to have a designated stand for disabled supporters.

Until 2003, the stadium and the vast amount of land that surrounds it were owned by Barnsley Football Club, but after the club fell into administration in 2002 the council purchased Oakwell Stadium to allow the club to pay its creditors and remain in the Football League.

In 2025, Oakwell Stadium held its first non-footballing event, with boxer Callum Simpson taking on Italian national Ivan Zucco in a head-to-head fight for the European Championship. Simpson won with a knockout in the 10th round in front of approximately 15,000 spectators.

== West Stand ==
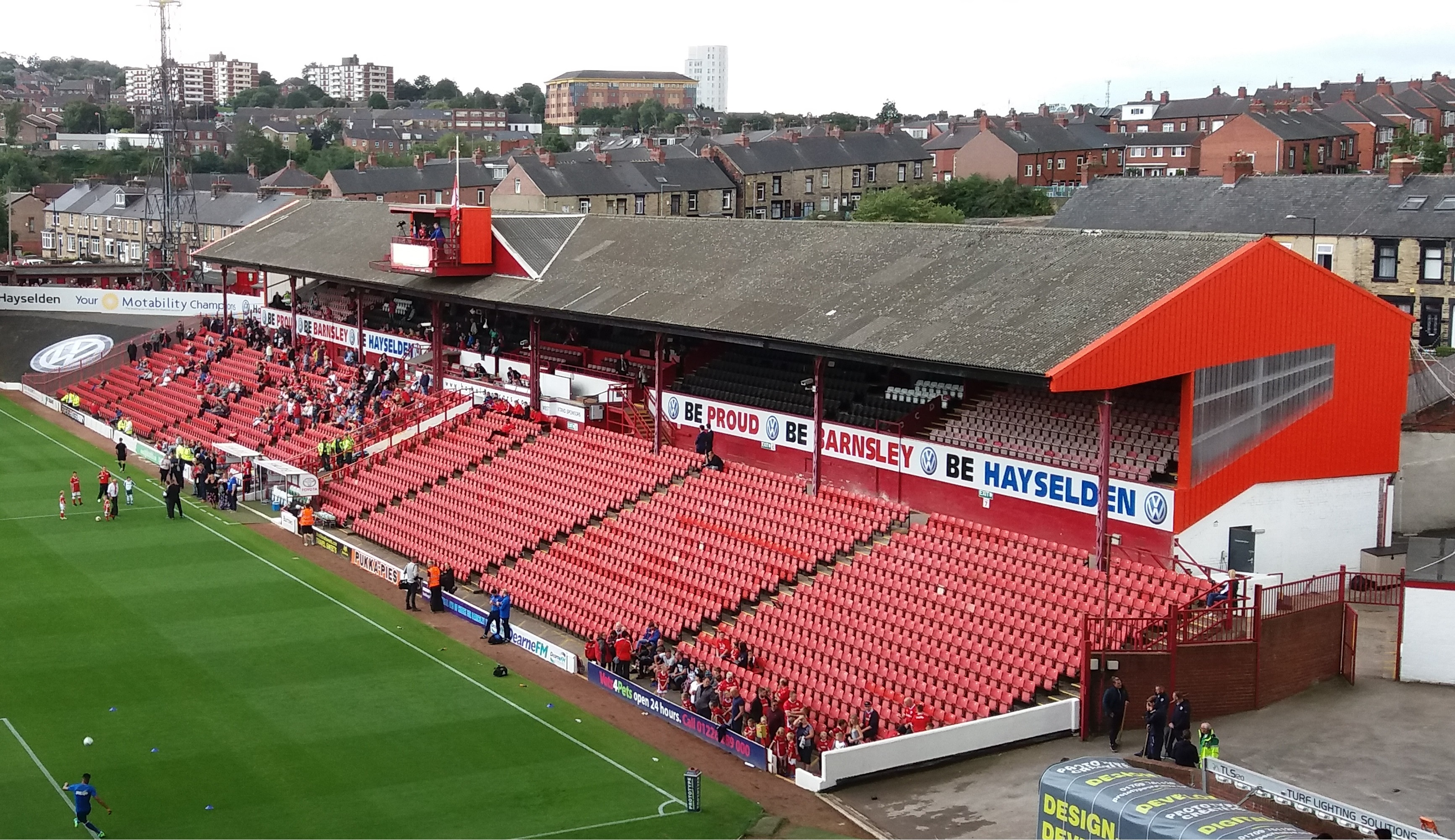
The West Stand

The stand is made up of two tiers, with only the upper tier covered, but at the expense of several supporting columns for the roof structure. The seats are the originals from the early 1900s, which gives a view with moderate legroom. In spite of the restricted views and modest facilities, the West Stand remains a popular vantage point for many fans. The lower tier of the West Stand is uncovered.

The roof of the West Stand is corrugated iron. This also houses the main television gantry, which is accessed from the upper-tier seating area by a temporary ladder.

At the end of the 1990s, the then stadium owners, Barnsley Football Club were considering re-developing the West Stand after several seasons of high attendances; however, with the rapid decline in fortunes of the football club, subsequent sale of the stadium and new club ownership, these plans are unlikely to come to fruition in the near future.

The stand also incorporates a traditional players' tunnel in the centre. While this is used for access to some of the facilities underneath the stand, the main players' tunnel now feeds out from the north-west corner, following the relocation of the changing rooms to the North Stand.

The West Stand is notable for being one of the few remaining Archibald Leitch stands in football. It is also rare to be unlisted as such.

The West Stand has a total seating capacity of 4,752.

On 7 September 2021, the club announced that the stand would be closed to spectators until further notice due to numerous safety concerns; consequently, the stadium's capacity dropped from 23,287 to 18,515. However, the club announced on 12 December 2021 that the West Stand would reopen on 15 January 2022. During its period of closure, the stand was open only to broadcasters and the media, with season tickets holders relocated to other parts of the stadium.

== East Stand ==
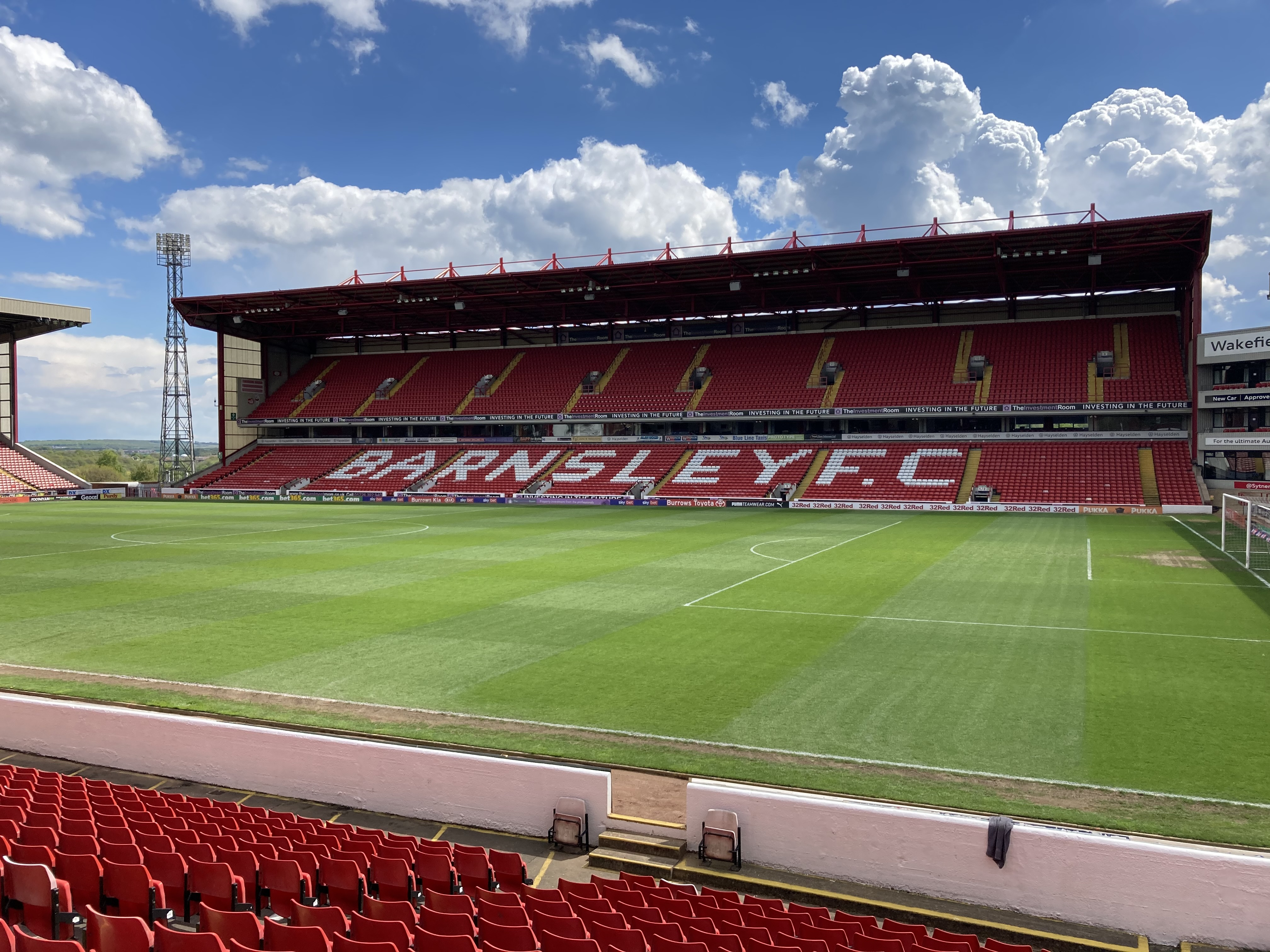
The East Stand and pitch

The East Stand is a two-tier development, completed in 1993. Funded in part by the football trust, the stand has a capacity of 7,492 and replaced a large covered terrace known as the Brewery Stand. The East Stand was designed by NYP Architects, as was the North Stand and the Corner Stand. With the completion of the East Stand, Barnsley FC became the first football club in Yorkshire to incorporate 'executive boxes' into their stadium.

Because of the sloped land on which Oakwell Stadium is built, the rear of the East Stand is much taller than it is from the pitch side, meaning that a climb to the upper-tier seating area requires many more steps than a spectator may anticipate; however, several lifts are available.

== Norman Rimmington Stand ==
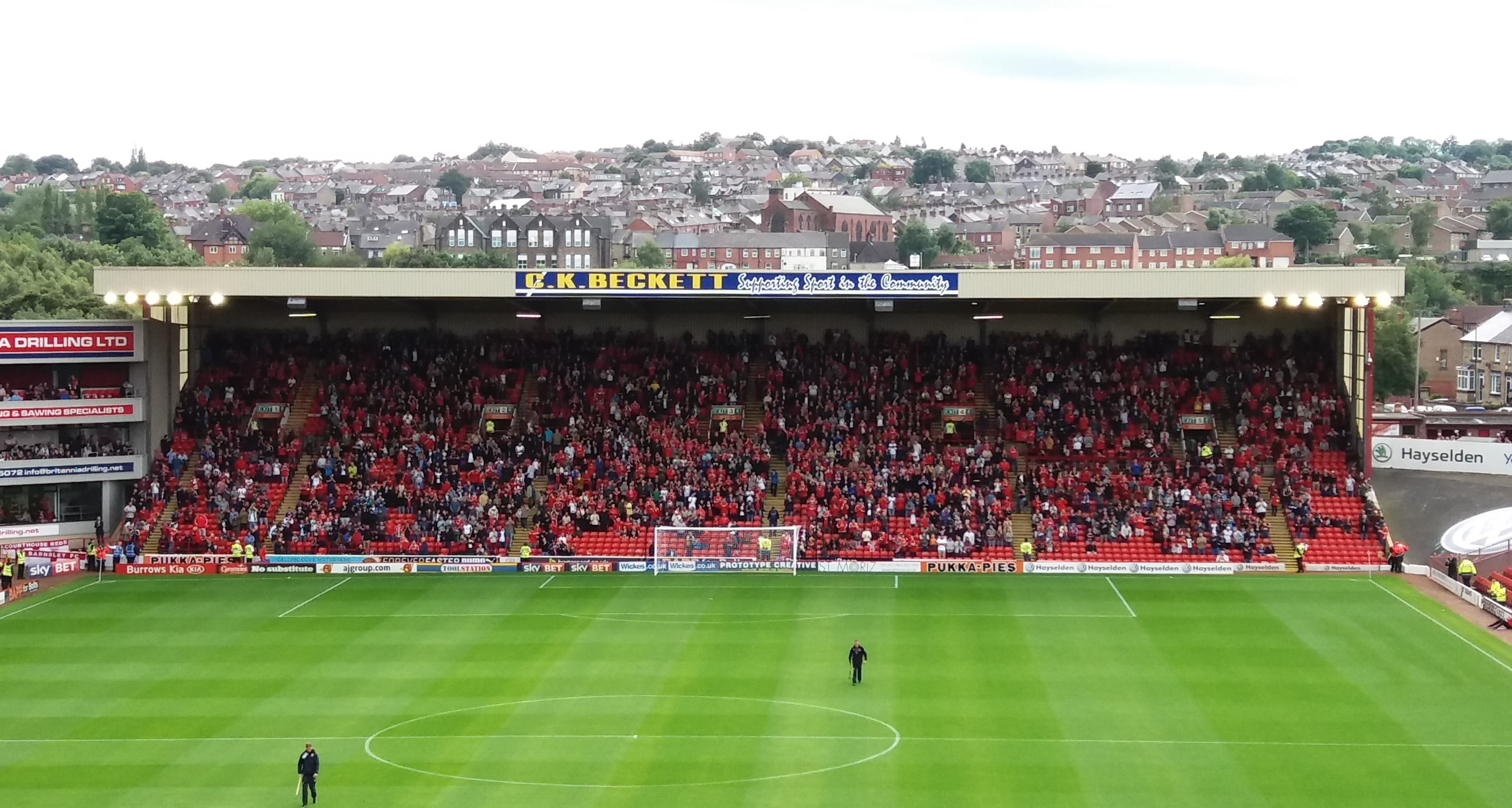
The Norman Rimmington Stand

Built in 1995, The Norman Rimmington Stand is the current name for what is traditionally known as the 'Pontefract Road End' or 'Ponty End'. Some fans continue to call it the 'ORA Stand', in reference to its original sponsors. It is also known as the Van Damme Stand. The stand was renamed in 2023, in honour of former Barnsley player, coach and club legend Norman Rimmington.

With a capacity of 4,508, the CK Beckett Stand is a large covered single-tier seating area behind the goal on the south side of the stadium.

This part of the stadium also houses the club superstore, the box office, and general administration offices.

== North Stand ==
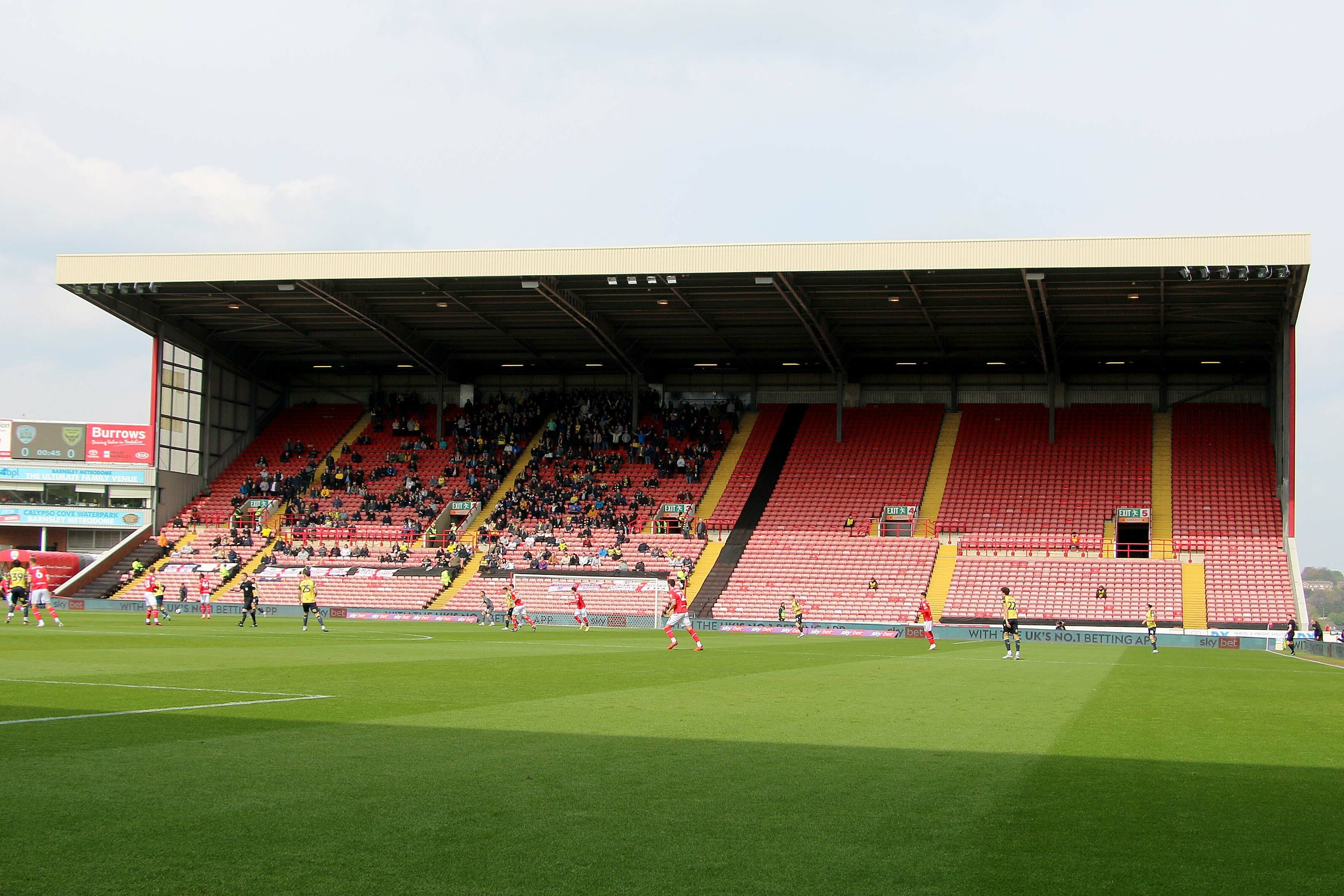
The North Stand

The North Stand is the most recent addition to Oakwell Stadium and is a large covered single-tiered seating area with a capacity of 6,257 spectators.

As this stand is generally reserved for away supporters, its full capacity is rarely utilized.

At a cost of £4.5 million (including several academy facilities that it accommodates), it has been a cause for debate ever since its construction. However, at the time it was built, Barnsley had only just been relegated from the FA Premier League and were planning for a possible return.

== Carseekers Corner Stand ==
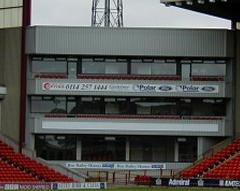
The Corner Stand

Built in the summer of 1998 and originally known as 'The Welcome Windows Stand', the structure provides further executive areas and disabled facilities for viewing an event.

Access to this area was also incorporated into the neighbouring East Stand on several levels; the spectator capacity of the structure is 202.

In August 2015, Barnsley announced the new sponsor of the stand, renaming it to the Brittania Drilling Limited Stand. However, on 9 October 2018, the sponsor changed yet again, to Wakefield Audi.

In 2023 it changed again to the Carseekers corner stand (informally known as the Carseekers Corner) It has remained the same since.

== Other uses ==
Since the 1990s, Oakwell Stadium has rarely been used by anyone other than Barnsley FC, apart from the occasional 'celebrity' charity football match.

Wakefield Trinity Wildcats rugby league club used the stadium for their first game in the Super League in 1998.

Non-league football club Wakefield and Emley used the stadium for an FA Cup tie against Rotherham in 1998, choosing a larger neutral venue as opposed to the traditional option of 'switching' the tie to the home of the team that was drawn away.

Premier League side Manchester City used the stadium for their first qualifying round UEFA Cup game in July 2008, since the pitch at the City of Manchester Stadium was unsuitable for football after the summer's commercial activities, such as boxing and music concerts, and was being re-turfed.

== Tragedy ==
On 27 December 1920, Horace Fairhurst, a full-back for the visiting Blackpool, received a blow to the head during the league encounter. He died at home eleven days later as a result of the injury.

== Transport ==
Barnsley Interchange, with rail services to Sheffield, Leeds, Wakefield, Chesterfield, Nottingham, and Huddersfield, is around half a mile from Oakwell, or around a ten-minute walk, initially uphill along Belgrave Rd, before going downhill on Bala Street. Pretty much a straight line.
