= Louis Greene =

English boxer (born 1992)

Personal information
- Nickname: The Medway Mauler
- Nationality: English
- Born: 20 July 1992 (age 34)
- Height: 6 ft (183 cm)
- Weight: Super-welterweight

Boxing career
- Stance: Orthodox

Boxing record
- Total fights: 24
- Wins: 19
- Win by KO: 12
- Losses: 5

Louis Greene (born 20 July 1992) is an English professional boxer who is a former Commonwealth super-welterweight champion.

== Career ==
Having compiled a record of 14 wins and three losses since turning professional in 2015, Greene stopped the previously unbeaten Dean Sutherland in the fifth round at the Beach Ballroom in Aberdeen on 26 November 2022 to claim the vacant Commonwealth super-welterweight title.

He successfully defended his title against Paul Kean at Caird Hall in Dundee on 6 May 2023, winning via technical knockout in the sixth round.

Greene made his second defense at York Hall in London on 21 October 2023, but lost via unanimous decision to Sam Gilley.

In his next fight, he got back to winning ways by stopping Jack McGann in the first round of their contest on the undercard of the Anthony Joshua vs Francis Ngannou bill at Kingdom Arena in Riyadh, Saudi Arabia, on 8 March 2024.

Greene was scheduled for a Commonwealth title rematch against Sam Gilley at York Hall on 18 October 2024, but was forced to withdraw due to illness. The fight was rescheduled to take place at Portman Road in Ipswich on 7 June 2025, with the vacant British super-welterweight crown also on the line. However, Greene withdrew for a second time after a contract dispute.

After 20 months away from the competitive boxing ring, Greene returned to face Dzmitry Atrokhau over six rounds at York Hall in London on 29 November 2025, winning by stoppage in the final round. On 8 August 2026, he defeated Daniel Buciuc on points in a six-round bout at 3Arena in Dublin, Ireland.

Greene faced Lee Cutler at the Copper Box Arena in London on 26 September 2026. He lost via unanimous decision.

== Personal life ==
Away from boxing, Greene works as a personal bodyguard.

== Professional boxing record ==
24 fights	19 wins	5 losses
By knockout	12	1
By decision	7	4

No.	Result	Record	Opponent	Type	Round, time	Date	Location	Notes
24	Loss	19–5	Lee Cutler	UD	10	26 Sep 2026	Copper Box Arena, London, England	
23	Win	19–4	Daniel Buciuc	PTS	6	8 Aug 2026	3Arena, Dublin, Ireland	
22	Win	18–4	Dzmitry Atrokhau	TKO	6 (6), 1:16	29 Nov 2025	York Hall, London, England	
21	Win	17–4	Jack McGann	TKO	1 (10), 1:29	8 Mar 2024	Kingdom Arena, Riyadh, Saudi Arabia	
20	Loss	16–4	Sam Gilley	UD	12	21 Oct 2023	York Hall, London, England	Lost Commonwealth super-welterweight title
19	Win	16–3	Paul Kean	TKO	6 (12), 2:56	6 May 2023	Caird Hall, Dundee, Scotland	Retained Commonwealth super-welterweight title
18	Win	15–3	Dean Sutherland	TKO	5 (12), 0:56	26 Nov 2022	Beach Ballroom, Aberdeen, Scotland	Won vacant Commonwealth super-welterweight title
17	Win	14–3	Tomasz Nowicki	TKO	5 (8), 2:54	20 May 2022	Środa Wielkopolska, Poland	
16	Loss	13–3	Harry Scarff	UD	10	26 Mar 2022	Wembley Arena, London, England	For vacant English welterweight title
15	Win	13–2	Octavian Gratii	PTS	6	5 Nov 2021	York Hall, London, England	
14	Loss	12–2	Lewis Crocker	TKO	7 (10), 2:02	26 Aug 2020	Production Park Studios, South Kirkby, England	For vacant WBO European welterweight title
13	Win	12–1	Berman Sánchez	RTD	5 (8), 3:00	29 Nov 2019	York Hall, London, England	
12	Win	11–1	Łukasz Wierzbicki	TKO	2 (8), 1:42	4 Oct 2019	Hala Sportowa, Częstochowa, Poland	
11	Win	10–1	Jumaane Camero	PTS	6	4 May 2019	York Hall, London, England	
10	Loss	9–1	Larry Ekundayo	UD	10	14 Dec 2018	York Hall, London, England	For IBF European welterweight title
9	Win	9–0	Joe Hayes	TKO	2 (10), 2:37	10 Mar 2018	Camden Centre, London, England	Retained Southern Area welterweight title
8	Win	8–0	Freddy Kiwitt	PTS	10	23 Sep 2017	York Hall, London, England	Won Southern Area welterweight title
7	Win	7–0	Rudolf Ďurica	TKO	5 (6), 1:43	27 May 2017	Maidstone Leisure Centre, Maidstone, England	
6	Win	6–0	Lee Gillespie	TKO	3 (6), 2:32	1 Apr 2017	National Sports Centre, London, England	
5	Win	5–0	Geiboord Omier	PTS	6	29 Oct 2016	Maidstone Leisure Centre, Maidstone, England	
4	Win	4–0	Jamie Quinn	PTS	4	4 Jun 2016	Maidstone Leisure Centre, Maidstone, England	
3	Win	3–0	Luka Lešković	PTS	4	12 Mar 2016	York Hall, London, England	
2	Win	2–0	Aleksejs Grustans	TKO	1 (4), 1:31	20 Feb 2026	Prince Regent Hotel, Chigwell, England	
1	Win	1–0	Dan Naylor	KO	2 (4), 2:13	7 Nov 2015	York Hall, London, England	
