= Ishmael Davis =

English boxer (born 1995)

Personal information
- Nickname: The Black Panther
- Nationality: English
- Born: 1 April 1995 (age 31)
- Height: 5 ft 9 in (175 cm)
- Weight: Super-welterweight

Boxing career
- Stance: Orthodox

Boxing record
- Total fights: 19
- Wins: 15
- Win by KO: 6
- Losses: 4

Ishmael Davis (born 1 April 1995) is an English professional boxer. He is a former British and Commonwealth super-welterweight champion.

== Career ==
Having taken up boxing aged 12, Davis turned professional in 2018, defeating Patryk Buczek on points over four rounds in his debut at Elland Road Banqueting Suite in Leeds on 7 September that year.

He won his first 13 fights, before stepping in on five days notice as a replacement opponent for Josh Kelly on the undercard of the Anthony Joshua vs Daniel Dubois world heavyweight title fight at Wembley Stadium in London on 21 September 2025. Davis lost by split decision with two of the ringside judges scoring the bout 115–113 and 115–114 respectively for his opponent, while the third had it a 114–114 draw.

Next he took another short-notice assignment, facing Serhii Bohachuk at Kingdom Arena in Riyadh, Saudi Arabia, on 21 December 2024, as part of a bill headlined by the rematch between Oleksandr Usyk and Tyson Fury. After agreeing to take the fight with only two weeks warning, Davis was knocked to the canvas in the second round and, although he recovered to continue the contest, he lost when his corner team retired him at the end of the sixth round.

He challenged WBA Continental super-welterweight champion Caoimhín Agyarko at Windsor Park in Belfast, Northern Ireland, on 13 September 2025. Despite sending his opponent to the mat in the 12th round, Davis lost via split decision with one judge favouring him 115–112, but being over-ruled by their two colleagues who both preferred Agyarko by a score of 114–113.

On 10 October 2025, he broke his losing streak when he defeated Elliot Eboigbe on points over six rounds back at Elland Road Banqueting Suite in Leeds.

Five weeks later, on 15 November 2025, Davis challenged Commonwealth super-welterweight champion Sam Gilley at Tottenham Hotspur Stadium in London with the vacant British title also on the line. Davis won by unanimous decision to claim the first titles of his professional career.

He made the first defense of his titles against English super-welterweight champion Bilal Fawaz at Nottingham Arena on 21 February 2026. Davis lost via majority decision with two of the judges seeing the fight 115–113 and 115–114 respectively for his opponent, overulling the third who had it a 114–114 draw.

== Personal life ==
Davis became the father of twins aged just 14 and spent two spells in prison for selling drugs before his boxing career began.

== Professional boxing record ==
19 fights	15 wins	4 losses
By knockout	6	1
By decision	9	3

No.	Result	Record	Opponent	Type	Round, time	Date	Location	Notes
19	Loss	15–4	Bilal Fawaz	MD	12	21 Feb 2026	Nottingham Arena, Nottingham, England	Lost British and Commonwealth super-welterweight titles
18	Win	15–3	Sam Gilley	UD	12	15 Nov 2025	Tottenham Hotspur Stadium, London, England	Won Commonwealth and vacant British super-welterweight titles
17	Win	14–3	Elliot Eboigbe	PTS	6	10 Oct 2025	Elland Road Banqueting Suite, Leeds, England	
16	Loss	13–3	Caoimhín Agyarko	SD	12	13 Sep 2025	Windsor Park, Belfast, Northern Ireland	For WBA Continental super-welterweight title
15	Loss	13–2	Serhii Bohachuk	RTD	6 (12), 3:00	21 Dec 2024	Kingdom Arena, Riyadh, Saudi Arabia	
14	Loss	13–1	Josh Kelly	MD	12	21 Sep 2024	Wembley Stadium, London, England	
13	Win	13–0	Troy Williamson	UD	12	23 Mar 2024	Sheffield Arena, Sheffield, England	
12	Win	12–0	Ewan Mackenzie	TKO	8 (10), 2:44	11 Nov 2023	Newcastle Arena, Newcastle, England	
11	Win	11–0	Lesther Espino	TKO	7 (8), 1:16	24 Jun 2023	Elland Road Banqueting Suite, Leeds, England	
10	Win	10–0	Dustin Ammann	TKO	5 (8), 1:05	11 Nov 2022	Sheffield Arena, Sheffield, England	
9	Win	9–0	Gabor Gorbics	TKO	5 (8), 2:35	18 Jun 2022	Elland Road Banqueting Suite, Leeds, England	
8	Win	8–0	Zane Clark	PTS	6	18 Mar 2022	Elland Road Banqueting Suite, Leeds, England	
7	Win	7–0	Darryl Sharp	PTS	4	19 Sep 2021	Elland Road Banqueting Suite, Leeds, England	
6	Win	6–0	Sam Omidi	TKO	1 (4), 2:16	15 Dec 2018	Elland Road Banqueting Suite, Leeds, England	
5	Win	5–0	Liam Griffiths	PTS	4	6 Sep 2019	Elland Road Banqueting Suite, Leeds, England	
4	Win	4–0	Victor Edagha	PTS	4	25 May 2019	Elland Road Banqueting Suite, Leeds, England	
3	Win	3–0	Dwain Grant	TKO	3 (4), 2:10	2 Dec 2018	Elland Road Banqueting Suite, Leeds, England	
2	Win	2–0	Scott Hillman	PTS	4	23 Nov 2018	Elland Road Banqueting Suite, Leeds, England	
1	Win	1–0	Patryk Buczek	PTS	4	7 Sep 2018	Elland Road Banqueting Suite, Leeds, England	
